= List of butterflies of the Korean Peninsula =

Location of North Korea

Location of South Korea

This is a list of butterflies of the Korean Peninsula, consisting of North Korea and South Korea. About 280 species are known from the Korean Peninsula. The butterflies (mostly diurnal) and moths (mostly nocturnal) together make up the taxonomic order Lepidoptera.

== Hesperiidae ==
- Aeromachus inachus (Menetries, 1859)
- Bibasis aquilina (Speyer, 1879)
- Bibasis striata (Hewitson, [1867])
- Carterocephalus argyrostigma Eversmann, 1851
- Carterocephalus dieckmanni Graeser, 1888
- Carterocephalus palaemon (Pallas, 1771)
- Carterocephalus silvicola (Meigen, 1829)
- Choaspes benjaminii (Guerin-Meneville, 1843)
- Daimio tethys (Menetries, 1857)
- Erynnis montanus (Bremer, 1861)
- Erynnis popoviana Nordmann, 1851
- Hesperia florinda (Butler, 1878)
- Heteropterus morpheus (Pallas, 1771)
- Isoteinon lamprospilus C. & R. Felder,
- Leptalina unicolor (Bremer & Grey, 1853)
- Lobocla bifasciatus (Bremer & Grey, 1853)
- Muschampia gigas (Bremer, 1864)
- Ochlodes ochracea (Bremer, 1861)
- Ochlodes subhyalina (Bremer & Grey, 1853)
- Ochlodes sylvanus (Esper, 1777)
- Ochlodes venata (Bremer & Grey, 1853)
- Parnara guttatus (Bremer & Grey, 1853)
- Pelopidas jansonis (Butler, 1878)
- Pelopidas mathias (Fabricius, 1798)
- Pelopidas sinensis (Mabille, 1877)
- Polytremis pellucida (Murray, 1875)
- Polytremis zina (Evans, 1932)
- Potanthus flava (Murray, 1875)
- Pyrgus alveus (Hübner, 1802)
- Pyrgus maculatus (Bremer & Grey, 1853)
- Pyrgus malvae (Linnaeus, 1758)
- Pyrgus speyeri (Staudinger, 1887)
- Satarupa nymphalis (Speyer, 1879)
- Spialia orbifer (Hübner, 1823)
- Thymelicus leonina (Butler, 1878)
- Thymelicus lineola (Ochsenheimer, 1808)
- Thymelicus sylvatica (Bremer, 1861)

== Lycaenidae ==
- Agriades optilete (Knoch, 1781)
- Ahlbergia ferrea (Butler, 1866)
- Ahlbergia frivaldszkyi (Lederer, 1855)
- Antigius attilia (Bremer, 1861)
- Antigius butleri (Fenton, 1881)
- Araragi enthea (Janson, 1877)
- Arhopala bazalus (Hewitson, 1862)
- Arhopala japonica (Murray, 1875)
- Aricia artaxerxes (Fabricius, 1793)
- Aricia chinensis (Murray, 1874)
- Artopoetes pryeri (Murray, 1873)
- Celastrina argiolus (Linnaeus, 1758)
- Celastrina filipjevi (Riley, 1934)
- Celastrina oreas (Leech, 1893)
- Celastrina sugitanii (Matsumura, 1919)
- Chrysozephyrus brillantinus (Staudinger, 1887)
- Chrysozephyrus smaragdinus (Bremer, 1861)
- Cigaritis takanonis (Matsumura, 1906)
- Coreana raphaelis (Oberthur, 1881)
- Cupido argiades (Pallas, 1771)
- Cupido minimus (Fuessly, 1775)
- Curetis acuta Moore, 1877
- Cyaniris semiargus (Rottemburg, 1775)
- Eumedonia eumedon (Esper, 1780)
- Favonius cognatus (Staudinger, 1892)
- Favonius koreanus Kim, 2006
- Favonius korshunovi (Dubatolov & Sergeev, 1982)
- Favonius orientalis (Murray, 1875)
- Favonius saphirinus (Staudinger, 1887)
- Favonius taxila (Bremer, 1861)
- Favonius ultramarinus (Fixsen, 1887)
- Favonius yuasai Shirozu, 1948
- Glaucopsyche lycormas (Butler, 1866)
- Jamides bochus (Stoll, 1782)
- Japonica lutea (Hewitson, 1865)
- Japonica saepestriata (Hewitson, 1865)
- Lampides boeticus (Linnaeus, 1767)
- Luthrodes pandava (Horsfield, 1829)
- Lycaena dispar (Haworth, 1803)
- Lycaena helle (Schiffermuller, 1775)
- Lycaena hippothoe (Linnaeus, 1761)
- Lycaena phlaeas (Linnaeus, 1761)
- Lycaena virgaureae (Linnaeus, 1758)
- Neozephyrus japonicus (Murray, 1875)
- Niphanda fusca (Bremer & Grey, 1853)
- Phengaris alcon (Denis & Schiffermuller, 1776)
- Phengaris arionides (Staudinger, 1887)
- Phengaris cyanecula (Eversmann, 1848)
- Phengaris kurentzovi (Sibatani, Saigusa & Hirowatari, 1994)
- Phengaris teleius (Bergstrasser, 1779)
- Plebejus argus (Linnaeus, 1758)
- Plebejus argyrognomon (Bergstrasser, 1779)
- Plebejus subsolanus (Eversmann, 1851)
- Polyommatus amandus (Schneider, 1792)
- Polyommatus icarus (Rottemburg, 1775)
- Polyommatus tsvetaevi Kurentzov, 1970
- Protantigius superans (Oberthur, 1913)
- Pseudozizeeria maha (Kollar, 1848)
- Rapala arata (Bremer, 1861)
- Rapala caerulea (Bremer & Grey, [1851])
- Satyrium eximius (Fixsen, 1887)
- Satyrium herzi (Fixsen, 1887)
- Satyrium latior (Fixsen, 1887)
- Satyrium pruni (Linnaeus, 1758)
- Satyrium prunoides (Staudinger, 1887)
- Satyrium w-album (Knoch, 1782)
- Scolitantides orion (Pallas, 1771)
- Shirozua jonasi (Janson, 1877)
- Sinia divina (Fixsen, 1887)
- Taraka hamada (Druce, 1875)
- Thecla betulae (Linnaeus, 1758)
- Thecla betulina Staudinger, 1887
- Thermozephyrus ataxus (Westwood, [1851])
- Tongeia fischeri (Eversmann, 1843)
- Udara albocaerulea (Moore, 1879)
- Udara dilectus (Moore, 1879)
- Ussuriana michaelis (Oberthur, 1881)
- Wagimo signata (Butler, 1881)
- Zizina otis (Fabricius, 1787)

== Nymphalidae ==
- Aglais io (Linnaeus, 1758)
- Aglais urticae (Linnaeus, 1758)
- Aldania deliquata (Stichel, 1908)
- Aldania raddei (Bremer, 1861)
- Aldania themis (Leech, 1890)
- Aldania thisbe (Menetries, 1859)
- Apatura ilia (Denis & Schiffermuller, 1775)
- Apatura iris (Linnaeus, 1758)
- Apatura metis Freyer, 1829
- Aphantopus hyperantus (Linnaeus, 1758)
- Araschnia burejana Bremer, 1861
- Araschnia levana (Linnaeus, 1758)
- Argynnis anadyomene C. & R. Felder, 1862
- Argynnis childreni Gray, 1831
- Argynnis hyperbius (Linnaeus, 1763)
- Argynnis laodice (Pallas, 1771)
- Argynnis paphia (Linnaeus, 1758)
- Argynnis ruslana Motschulsky, 1866
- Argynnis sagana Doubleday, [1847]
- Argynnis zenobia Leech, 1890
- Boloria angarensis (Erschoff, 1870)
- Boloria euphrosyne (Linnaeus, 1758)
- Boloria oscarus (Eversmann, 1844)
- Boloria perryi (Butler, 1882)
- Boloria selene (Denis & Schiffermüller, 1775)
- Boloria selenis (Eversmann, 1837)
- Boloria thore (Hübner, [1803-1804])
- Boloria titania (Esper, 1790)
- Brenthis daphne (Denis & Schiffermüller, 1775)
- Brenthis ino (Rottemburg, 1775)
- Chalinga pratti (Leech, 1890)
- Chitoria ulupi (Doherty, 1889)
- Coenonympha amaryllis (Stoll, 1782)
- Coenonympha glycerion (Borkhausen, 1788)
- Coenonympha hero (Linnaeus, 1761)
- Coenonympha oedippus (Fabricius, 1787)
- Cyrestis thyodamas Boisduval, 1836
- Danaus chrysippus (Linnaeus, 1758)
- Danaus genutia (Cramer, 1779)
- Dichorragia nesimachus Boisduval, 1836
- Dilipa fenestra (Leech, 1891)
- Erebia cyclopius (Eversmann, 1844)
- Erebia edda Menetries, 1854
- Erebia embla (Thunberg, 1791)
- Erebia kozhantshikovi Sheljuzhko, 1925
- Erebia ligea (Linnaeus, 1758)
- Erebia neriene (Bober, 1809)
- Erebia radians Staudinger, 1886
- Erebia rossii Curtis, 1835
- Erebia theano (Tauscher, 1809)
- Erebia wanga Bremer, 1864
- Fabriciana nerippe (C. & R. Felder, 1862)
- Fabriciana niobe (Linnaeus, 1758)
- Fabriciana vorax (Butler, 1871)
- Euphydryas ichnea (Boisduval, 1833)
- Euphydryas sibirica (Staudinger, 1861)
- Hestina assimilis (Linnaeus, 1758)
- Hestina japonica (C. & R. Felder, 1862)
- Hipparchia autonoe (Esper, 1783)
- Hypolimnas bolina (Linnaeus, 1758)
- Hypolimnas misippus Linnaeus, 1764
- Junonia almana (Linnaeus, 1758)
- Junonia orithya (Linnaeus, 1758)
- Kirinia epaminondas (Staudinger, 1887)
- Kirinia epimenides (Menetries, 1859)
- Lethe diana (Butler, 1866)
- Lethe marginalis (Motschulsky, 1860)
- Libythea celtis (Laicharting, 1782)
- Limenitis amphyssa Menetries, 1859
- Limenitis camilla (Linnaeus, 1764)
- Limenitis doerriesi Staudinger, 1892
- Limenitis helmanni Lederer, 1853
- Limenitis homeyeri Tancre, 1881
- Limenitis moltrechti Kardakov, 1928
- Limenitis populi (Linnaeus, 1758)
- Limenitis sydyi Lederer, 1853
- Lopinga achine (Scopoli, 1763)
- Lopinga deidamia (Eversmann, 1851)
- Melanargia epimede Staudinger, 1887
- Melanargia halimede (Menetries, 1859)
- Melanitis leda (Linnaeus, 1758)
- Melanitis phedima (Cramer, [1780])
- Melitaea ambigua (Menetries, 1859)
- Melitaea arcesia Bremer, 1861
- Melitaea britomartis Assmann, 1847
- Melitaea diamina (Lang, 1789)
- Melitaea didymoides Eversmann, 1847
- Melitaea plotina Bremer, 1861
- Melitaea protomedia Menetries, 1859
- Melitaea scotosia Butler, 1878
- Melitaea sutschana Staudinger, 1892
- Mimathyma nycteis (Menetries, 1859)
- Mimathyma schrenckii (Menetries, 1859)
- Minois dryas (Scopoli, 1763)
- Mycalesis francisca (Stoll, [1780])
- Mycalesis gotama Moore, 1857
- Neptis alwina Bremer & Grey, 1853
- Neptis andetria Fruhstofer, 1913
- Neptis philyra Menetries, 1859
- Neptis philyroides Staudinger, 1887
- Neptis pryeri Butler, 1871
- Neptis rivularis (Scopoli, 1763)
- Neptis sappho Pallas, 1771
- Neptis speyeri Staudinger, 1887
- Ninguta schrenckii (Menetries, 1858)
- Nymphalis antiopa (Linnaeus, 1758)
- Nymphalis canace (Linnaeus, 1763)
- Nymphalis l-album (Esper, 1785)
- Nymphalis xanthomelas (Denis & Schiffermuller, 1775)
- Oeneis jutta (Hübner, 1806)
- Oeneis magna Graeser, 1888
- Oeneis mongolica (Oberthur, 1876)
- Oeneis urda (Eversmann, 1847)
- Parantica melaneus (Cramer, 1775)
- Parantica sita (Kollar, 1844)
- Polygonia c-album (Linnaeus, 1758)
- Polygonia c-aureum (Linnaeus, 1758)
- Sasakia charonda (Hewitson, 1862)
- Sephisa princeps (Fixsen, 1887)
- Speyeria aglaja (Linnaeus, 1758)
- Triphysa albovenosa Erschoff, 1885
- Vanessa cardui (Linnaeus, 1758)
- Vanessa indica (Herbst, 1794)
- Ypthima baldus (Fabricius, 1775)
- Ypthima motschulskyi (Bremer & Grey, 1853)
- Ypthima multistriata Butler, 1883

== Papilionidae ==
- Atrophaneura alcinous (Klug, 1836)
- Graphium sarpedon (Linnaeus, 1758)
- Luehdorfia puziloi (Erschoff, 1872)
- Papilio bianor Cramer, 1777
- Papilio helenus Linnaeus, 1758
- Papilio maackii Menetries, 1859
- Papilio machaon Linnaeus, 1758
- Papilio macilentus Janson, 1877
- Papilio memnon Linnaeus, 1758
- Papilio protenor Cramer, [1775]
- Papilio xuthus Linnaeus, 1767
- Parnassius bremeri Bremer, 1864
- Parnassius eversmanni Menetries, 1849
- Parnassius nomion Fischer de Waldheim, 1823
- Parnassius stubbendorfii Menetries, 1849
- Sericinus montela Gray, 1852

== Pieridae ==
- Anthocharis scolymus Butler, 1866
- Aporia crataegi (Linnaeus, 1758)
- Aporia hippia (Bremer, 1861)
- Catopsilia pomona (Fabricius, 1775)
- Colias erate (Esper, 1805)
- Colias fieldii Menetries, 1855
- Colias heos (Herbst, 1792)
- Colias palaeno (Linnaeus, 1761)
- Colias tyche Bober, 1812
- Eurema brigitta (Stoll, [1780])
- Eurema hecabe (Linnaeus, 1758)
- Eurema laeta (Boisduval, 1836)
- Gonepteryx mahaguru Gistel, 1857
- Gonepteryx maxima Butler, 1885
- Leptidea amurensis Menetries, 1859
- Leptidea morsei Fenton, 1881
- Pieris canidia (Linnaeus, 1768)
- Pieris dulcinea Butler, 1882
- Pieris melete Menetries, 1857
- Pieris rapae (Linnaeus, 1758)
- Pontia chloridice (Hübner, 1803-1818)
- Pontia edusa (Fabricius, 1777)
