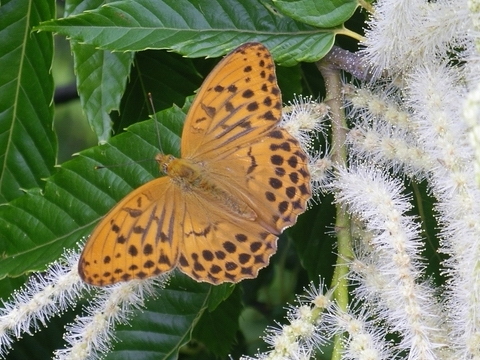
- Male Argynnis sagana, previously treated as Damora sagana.

Scientific classification
- Kingdom: Animalia
- Phylum: Arthropoda
- Clade: Pancrustacea
- Class: Insecta
- Order: Lepidoptera
- Family: Nymphalidae
- Subfamily: Heliconiinae
- Tribe: Argynnini; Duponchel, 1835

Genera
- Around nine, but see text

= Argynnini =

Tribe of butterflies

Argynnini is a tribe of butterflies in the subfamily Heliconiinae, containing some of the fritillaries. This group has roughly 100 species worldwide and roughly 30 in North America.

== Systematics ==
This group has also been classified as subtribe Argynnina of the Heliconiini, or even as a distinct subfamily Argynninae in the Nymphalidae.

== Genera ==
Following studies of molecular phylogeny, genus delimitation has been unstable in recent years. Several earlier genera are now junior synonyms of Argynnis (Argyreus, Argyronome, Damora and others, but Speyeria and Fabriciana have been split off again). Similarly, Boloria now includes Clossiana and Proclossiana, and Issoria includes Kuekenthaliella.

- Euptoieta Doubleday, 1848
- Pardopsis Trimen, 1887 (uncertain placement, possibly in Acraeini, although more recent analysis places the genus in Argynnini)
- Yramea Reuss, 1920
- Boloria Moore, 1900 (now including Clossiana and Proclossiana)
- Issoria Hübner, 1819
- Brenthis Hübner, 1819
- Argynnis Fabricius, 1807
- Speyeria Scudder, 1872 (previously included in Argynnis)
- Fabriciana Reuss, 1920 (previously included in Argynnis)
