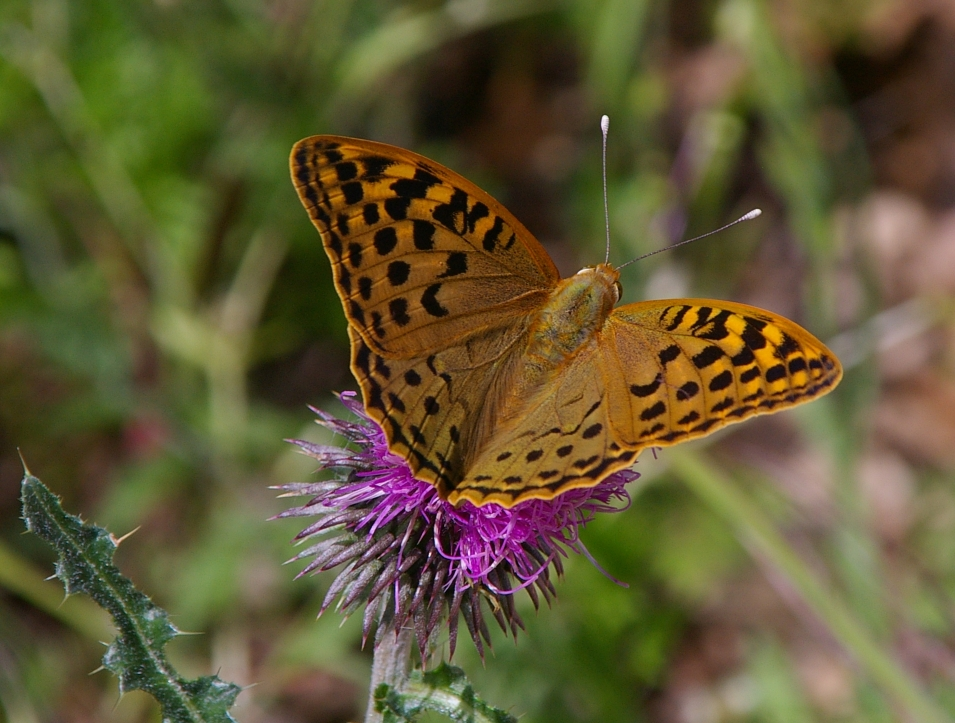
- Cardinal (Argynnis pandora)

Scientific classification
- Kingdom: Animalia
- Phylum: Arthropoda
- Class: Insecta
- Order: Lepidoptera
- Family: Nymphalidae
- Subfamily: Heliconiinae
- Tribe: Argynnini
- Genus: Argynnis; Fabricius, 1807

Synonyms
- Fabriciana Reuss, 1920; Speyeria Scudder, 1872; Argyreus Scopoli, 1777; Argyronome Hübner, 1819; Childrena Hemming, 1943; Damora Nordmann, 1851; Nephargynnis Shirôzu & Saigusa, 1973; Pandoriana Warren, 1942

= Argynnis =

Genus of brush-footed butterflies

Argynnis is a genus of butterflies in the family Nymphalidae, one of several groups known as "fritillaries".

This genus has three subgenera: Argynnis, Fabriciana, and Speyeria. The species of the subgenera Argynnis and Fabriciana are found in Europe and Asia, while those of Speyeria are widespread in North America but also found in Europe and Asia.

== Systematics ==
Several current species of Argynnis used to be included in distinct genera, such as Argyreus (for A. hyperbius), Argyronome (for A. laodice, A. ruslana, and A. kuniga), Childrena (for A. childreni and A. zenobia), and Damora (for A. sagana). All of these genera are now viewed as junior synonyms of Argynnis.

Speyeria, Fabriciana, Argynnis have been viewed as separate genera, but Speyeria and Fabriciana are now considered subgenera of the genus Argynnis, with Speyeria encompassing the earlier Mesoacidalia.

== Species ==
These species are members of the genus Argynnis .

Subgenus Argynnis
Argynnis anadyomene Felder, 1861 – (palearctic fritillary)
Argynnis childreni Gray, 1831 – (large silverstripe)
Argynnis hyperbius (Linnaeus, 1763) – (tropical fritillary)
Argynnis laodice (Pallas, 1771) – (pallas's fritillary)
Argynnis pandora (Denis & Schiffermuller, 1775) – (cardinal butterfly)
Argynnis paphia (Linnaeus, 1758) – (silver-washed fritillary)
Argynnis ruslana Motschulsky, 1866
Argynnis sagana Doubleday, 1847 – (sagana fritillary)
Argynnis zenobia Leech, 1890
Subgenus Fabriciana
Argynnis adippe (Denis & Schiffermuller, 1775) – (high brown fritillary)
Argynnis auresiana Frühstorfer, 1908 – (false grayling)
Argynnis elisa Godart, 1823 – (Corsican fritillary)
Argynnis jainadeva Moore, 1864 – (highbrown silverspot)
Argynnis kamala Moore, 1857 – (common silverstripe)
Argynnis nerippe (Felder, 1862) – (nerippe fritillary)
Argynnis niobe (Linnaeus, 1758) – (niobe fritillary)
Argynnis vorax Butler, 1871
Argynnis xipe Grum-Grshimailo, 1891
Subgenus Speyeria Scudder, 1872 – (greater fritillaries)
Speyeria adiaste (W. H. Edwards, 1864) – (adiaste fritillary)
Speyeria aglaja (Linnaeus, 1758) – (dark green fritillary)
Argynnis alexandra (Menetries, 1832)
Speyeria aphrodite (Fabricius, 1787) – (Aphrodite fritillary)
Speyeria atlantis (W. H. Edwards, 1862) – (Atlantis fritillary)
Speyeria callippe (Boisduval, 1852) – (callippe fritillary)
Speyeria clara (Blanchard, 1844) – (silverstreak)
Speyeria coronis (Behr, 1864) – (coronis fritillary)
Speyeria cybele (Fabricius, 1775) – (great spangled fritillary)
Speyeria diana (Cramer, 1777) – (Diana fritillary)
Speyeria edwardsii (Reakirt, 1866) – (Edwards' fritillary)
Speyeria egleis (Behr, 1862) – (Great Basin fritillary or egleis fritillary)
Speyeria hesperis (W. H. Edwards, 1864) – (northwestern fritillary)
Argynnis irene (Boisduval, 1869) – (a northwestern fritillary)
Speyeria hydaspe (Boisduval, 1869) – (hydaspe fritillary)
Speyeria idalia (Drury, 1773) – (regal fritillary)
Speyeria mormonia (Boisduval, 1869) – (Mormon fritillary)
Argynnis nausicaa (Edwards, 1874) – (Nausicaa fritillary)
Speyeria nokomis (W. H. Edwards, 1862) – (nokomis fritillary)
Speyeria zerene (Boisduval, 1852) – (zerene fritillary)
Speyeria zerene hippolyta (Edwards, 1879) – (subspecies of the zerene fritillary)
Not assigned to subgenus
Argynnis claudia Fawcett, 1904
Argynnis tropicalis Röber, 1919
Argynnis westphali Gallo & Della Bruna, 2016 – (Emerald-and-Silver Fritillary)
