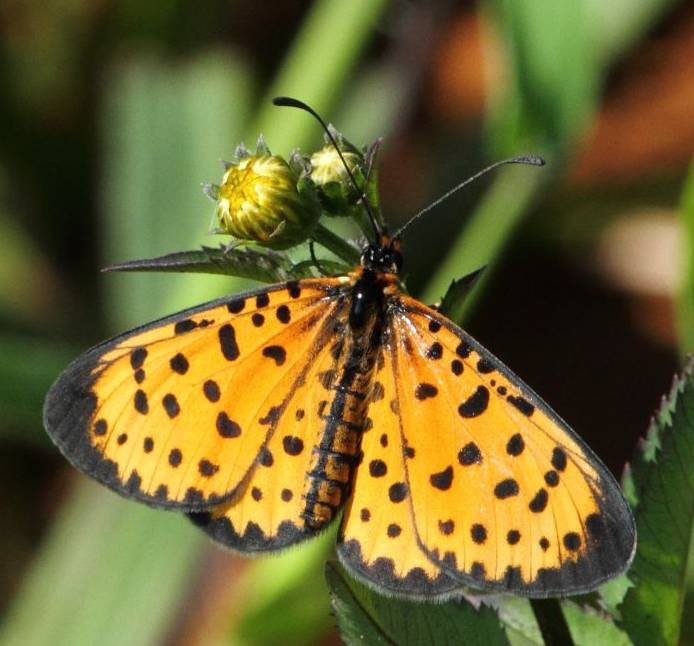
- Polka dot

Scientific classification
- Domain: Eukaryota
- Kingdom: Animalia
- Phylum: Arthropoda
- Class: Insecta
- Order: Lepidoptera
- Family: Nymphalidae
- Tribe: Argynnini
- Genus: Pardopsis; Trimen, 1887
- Species: P. punctatissima

Binomial name
- Pardopsis punctatissima (Boisduval, 1833)

Synonyms
- Acraea punctatissima Boisduval, 1833; Acraea stictica Boisduval, 1847

= Pardopsis =

Monotypic brush-footed butterfly genus

Pardopsis is a monotypic butterfly genus in the family Nymphalidae.

Its only species is Pardopsis punctatissima, the polka dot. It is found in the fynbos of South Africa, in lowland and Afromontane forest, and grassland from Van Stadens Pass in the Eastern Cape, along the foothills of the eastern escarpment into Mpumalanga and Limpopo, north to Mozambique and from Zimbabwe to Ethiopia. It is also present in Madagascar.

The wingspan is 30–34 mm for males and 33–36 mm for females. Adults are on wing year round with a peak from October to March.

The larvae feed on Hybanthus capensis.
