= Triphysa dohrnii =

Scientific classification
- Kingdom: Animalia
- Phylum: Arthropoda
- Class: Insecta
- Order: Lepidoptera
- Family: Nymphalidae
- Genus: Triphysa
- Species: T. dohrnii

Binomial name
- Triphysa dohrnii Zeller, 1850

Synonyms
- Triphysa striatula Elwes, 1899; Coenonympha dohrnii

Species of butterfly

Triphysa dohrnii is a butterfly of the family Nymphalidae. It is found in Russia (the southern Altai Mountains, Tuva, Transbaikalia), north-western China and Mongolia. Seitz dohrni Z., has a broader, more whitish metallic margin than phryne. The habitat consists of mountainous steppe up to altitudes of 2,400 meters.

Adults are on wing from June to July.

== Subspecies ==
- Triphysa dohrnii dohrnii (Transbaikalia and the Amur region)
- Triphysa dohrnii glacialis Bang-Haas, 1912 (Sayan)
