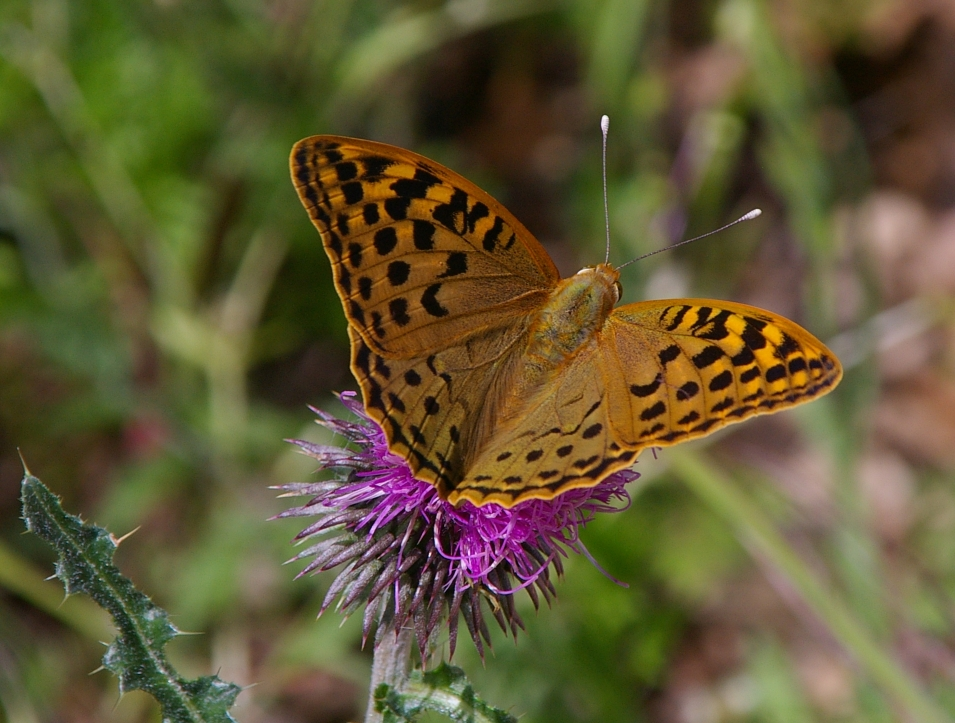

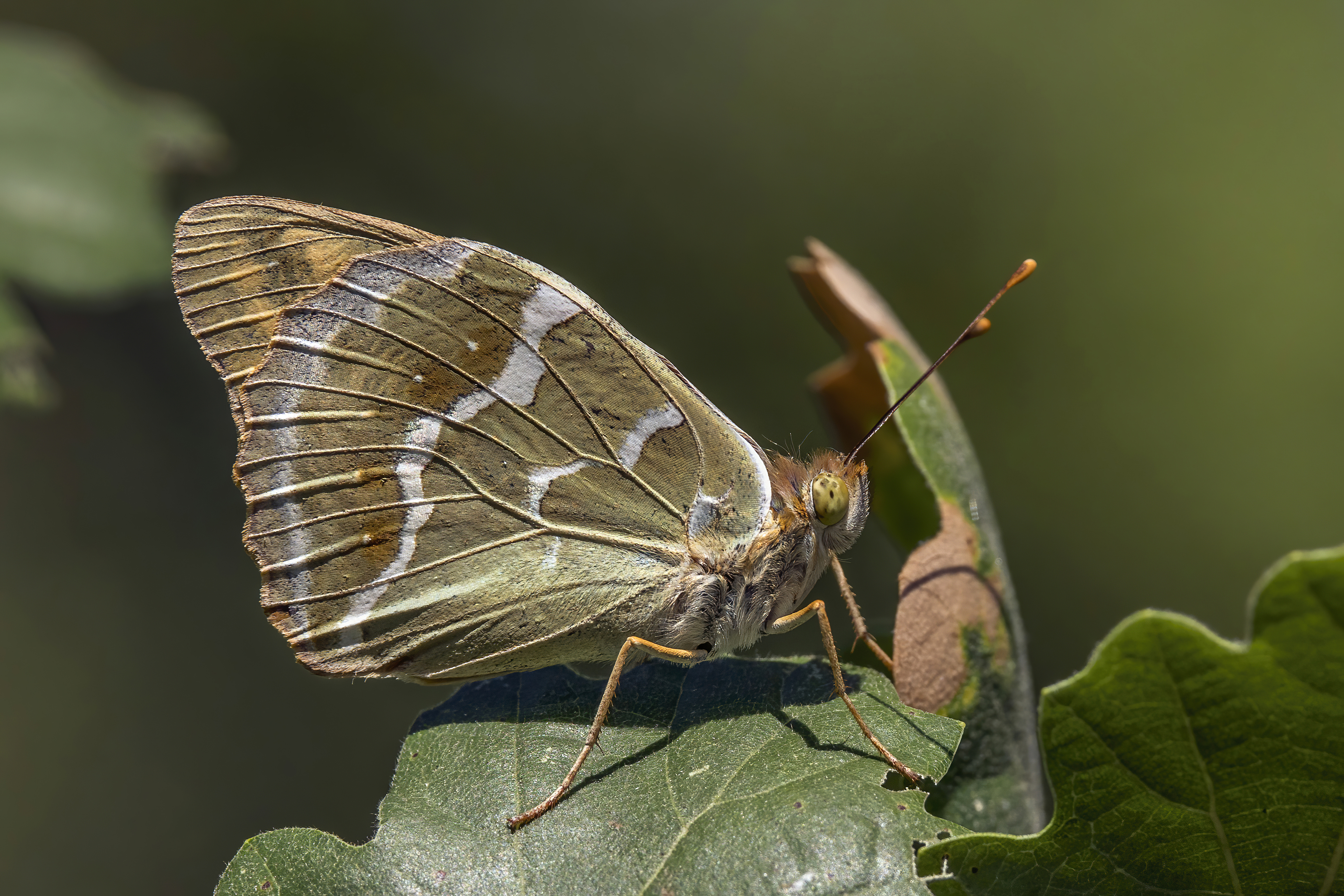
- Female underside

Scientific classification
- Kingdom: Animalia
- Phylum: Arthropoda
- Clade: Pancrustacea
- Class: Insecta
- Order: Lepidoptera
- Family: Nymphalidae
- Genus: Argynnis
- Species: A. pandora

Binomial name
- Argynnis pandora (Denis & Schiffermüller, 1775)

Synonyms
- Pandoriana pandora

= Argynnis pandora =

Cardinal

Species of butterfly

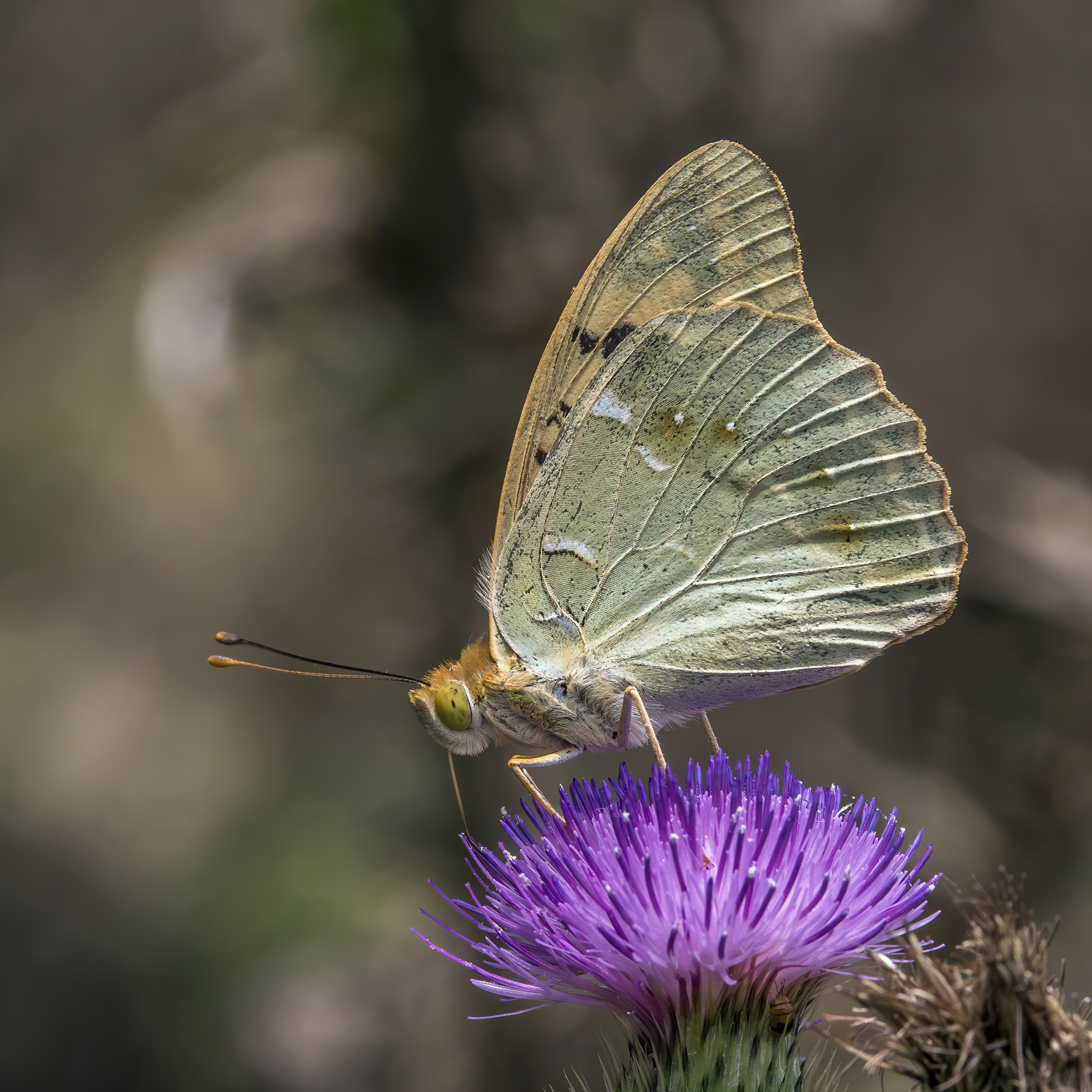
Male underside

Argynnis pandora, the cardinal, is a butterfly of the family Nymphalidae. It is common throughout southern Europe and is also found in northern Africa and the Middle east and then east across the Palearctic to the Tian-Shan andnorthwestern India.

== Description in Seitz ==
The wingspan is 64–80 mm. A. pandora Schiff. (= cinara F., maja Cr.) (71c). The largest European Argynnis. Above stronglyre calling valesina, but brighter greenish, densely spotted with black. Beneath quite different, the apex of the forewing and the hindwing bright green, the disc of the forewing fleshy red and spotted with deep black, the hindwing with a few narrow bands, which are more white than silvery and vary strongly in number and development.In ab. dacica Horinuz., a kind of valesina-form from Roumania, the basal area of both wings darkened, contrasting with the distal area, which is slightly paler than usual. — pasargades Fruhst.[now subspeciesA. p. pasargades], from the Alexander Mts., has the whole upperside pale, especially the forewing, which has hardly a trace of green, being also paler yellow beneath, with the black markings reduced. — seitzi Fruhst.[now subspecies A. p. seitzi Fruhstorfer, 1908] (71c) has been described fromspecimens found by me [Stichel] in the Aures Mts. in Algeria. Larger than European individuals, paler green beneath, darker greenish yellow above; the black markings more prominent and abundant, often confluent. — paupercula' Ragusa has no silvery white bands and spots; especially in the southern districts, where it is locally the prevalent form, for instance in Algeria. — Larva purplish brown, with black head, without the yellow dorsal stripe of paphia, otherwise similar to the latter, but the spines shorter; on the back of each segment a velvety black spot with 2 white dashes; until June on Viola. The species occurs particularly in the Mediterranean countries, being found in North Africa, the Canaries, Spain, South France northward to the Valais, where it approaches the German frontier, also in Italy, the south of Austria-Hungary, Turkey and Asia Minor, going eastward to the Tian-shan; plentiful in some places. The butterflies are on the wing from June onwards; their flight is fast and graceful, rushing or swimming, and they usually settle on those branches of trees which hang over the road, or on thistle-heads.

== Biology ==
The butterfly flies from April to September (in Europe typically May to August) depending on the location. In Switzerland, the species is found at altitudes of up to 2600 meters. Among other habitats, it favours deciduous and open pine forests, in which there is a large supply of nectar-rich plants from the genera Cirsium, Carduus or Centaurea.

The larvae feed on Viola species.

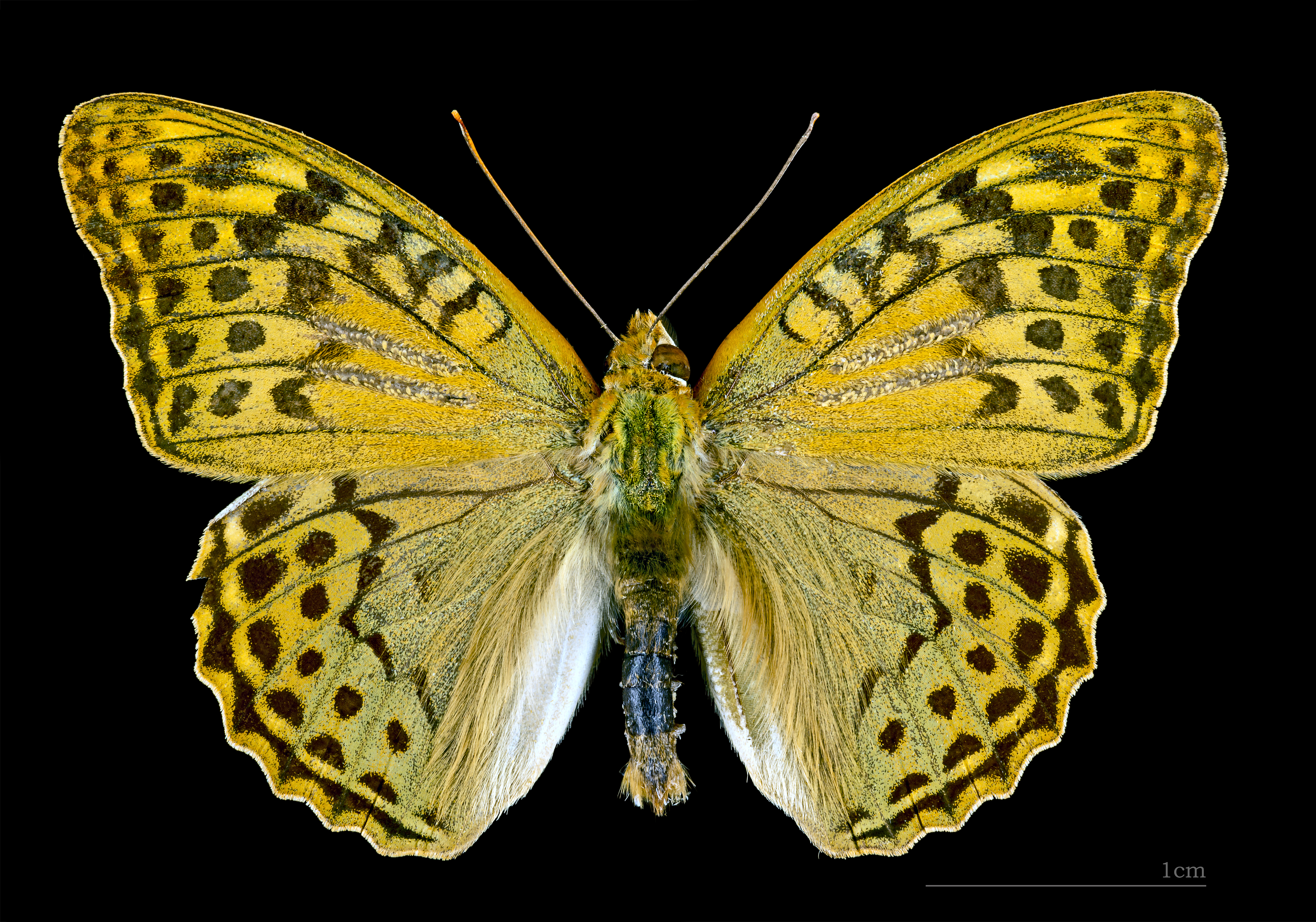
Male

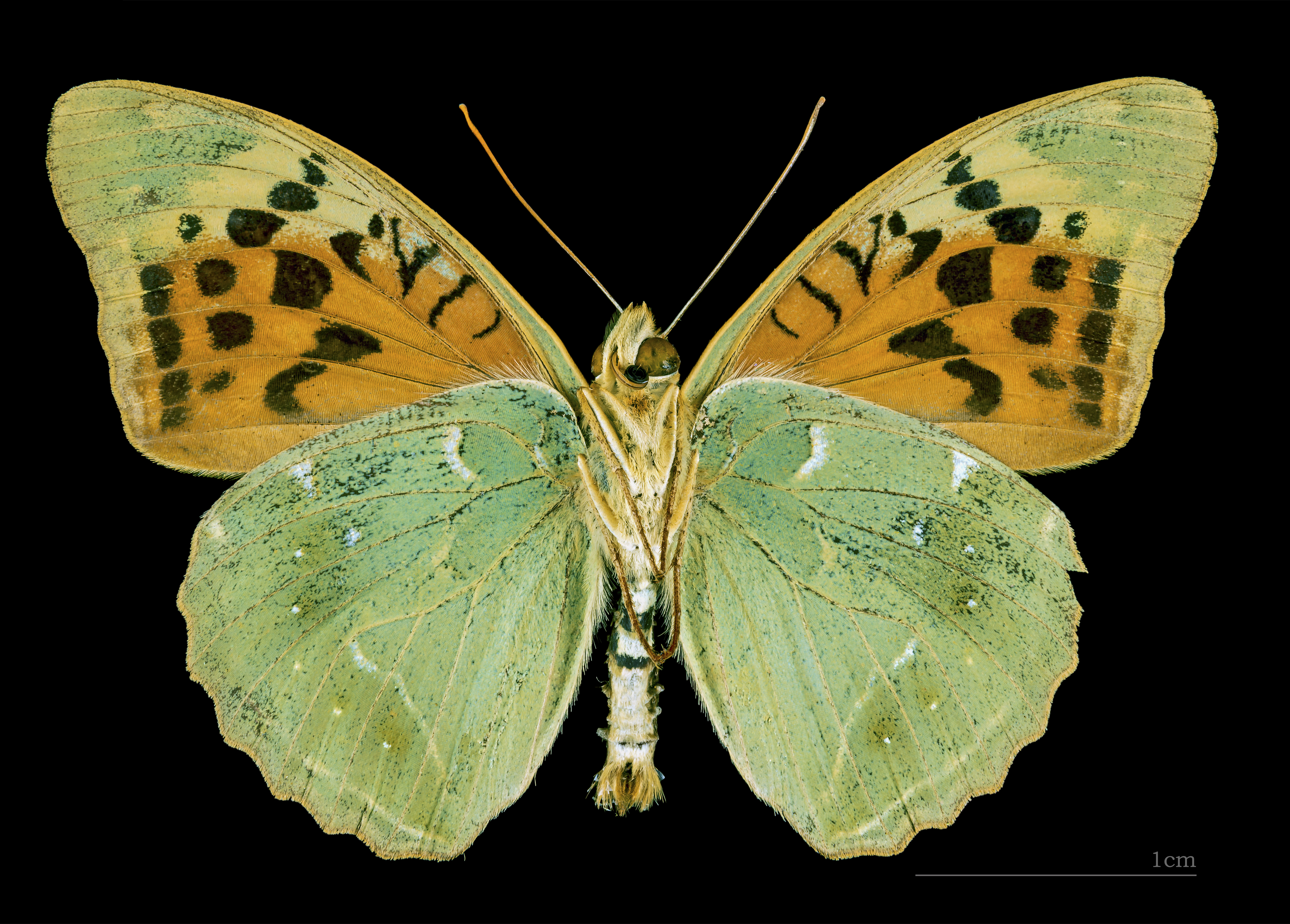
Male underside

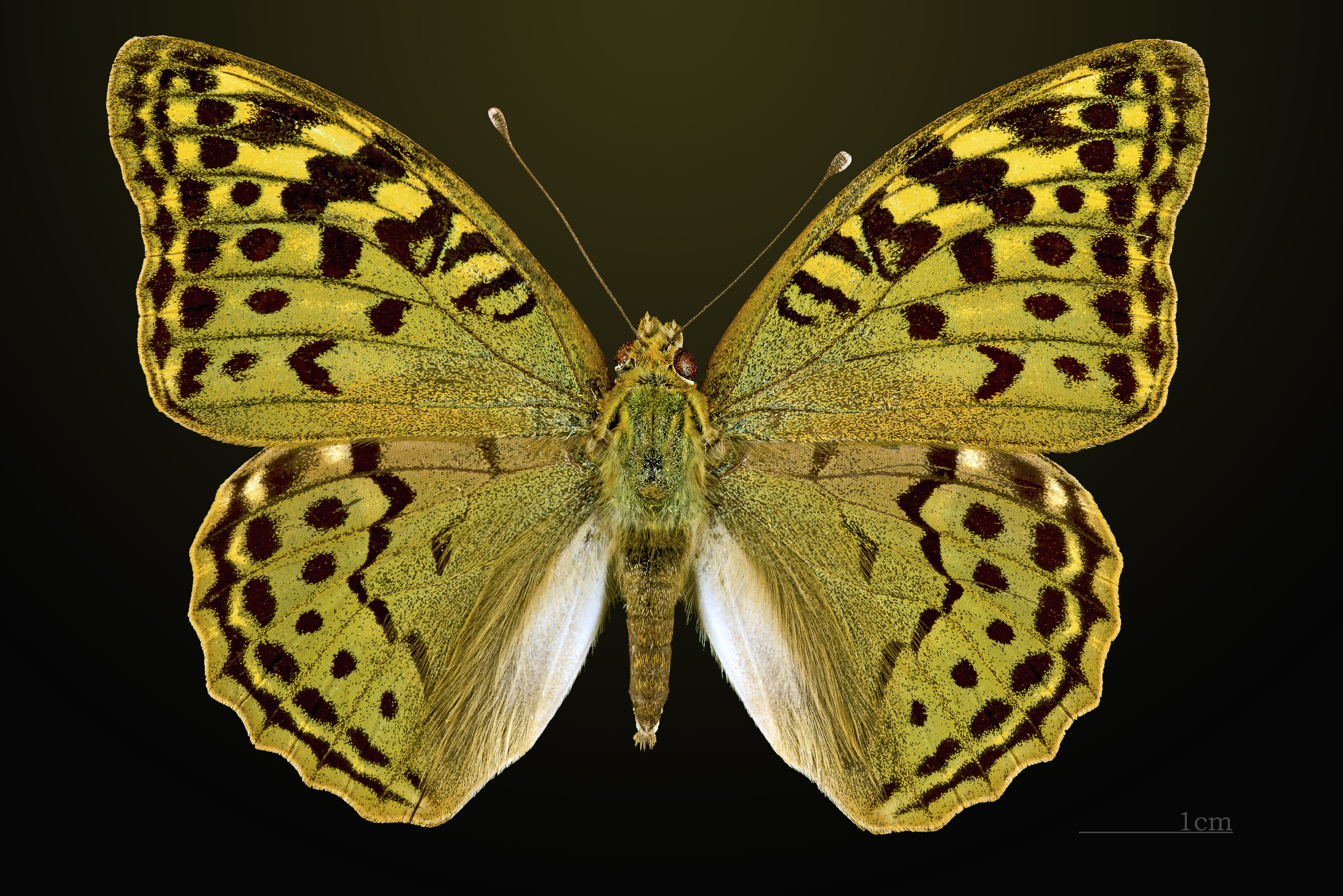
Female

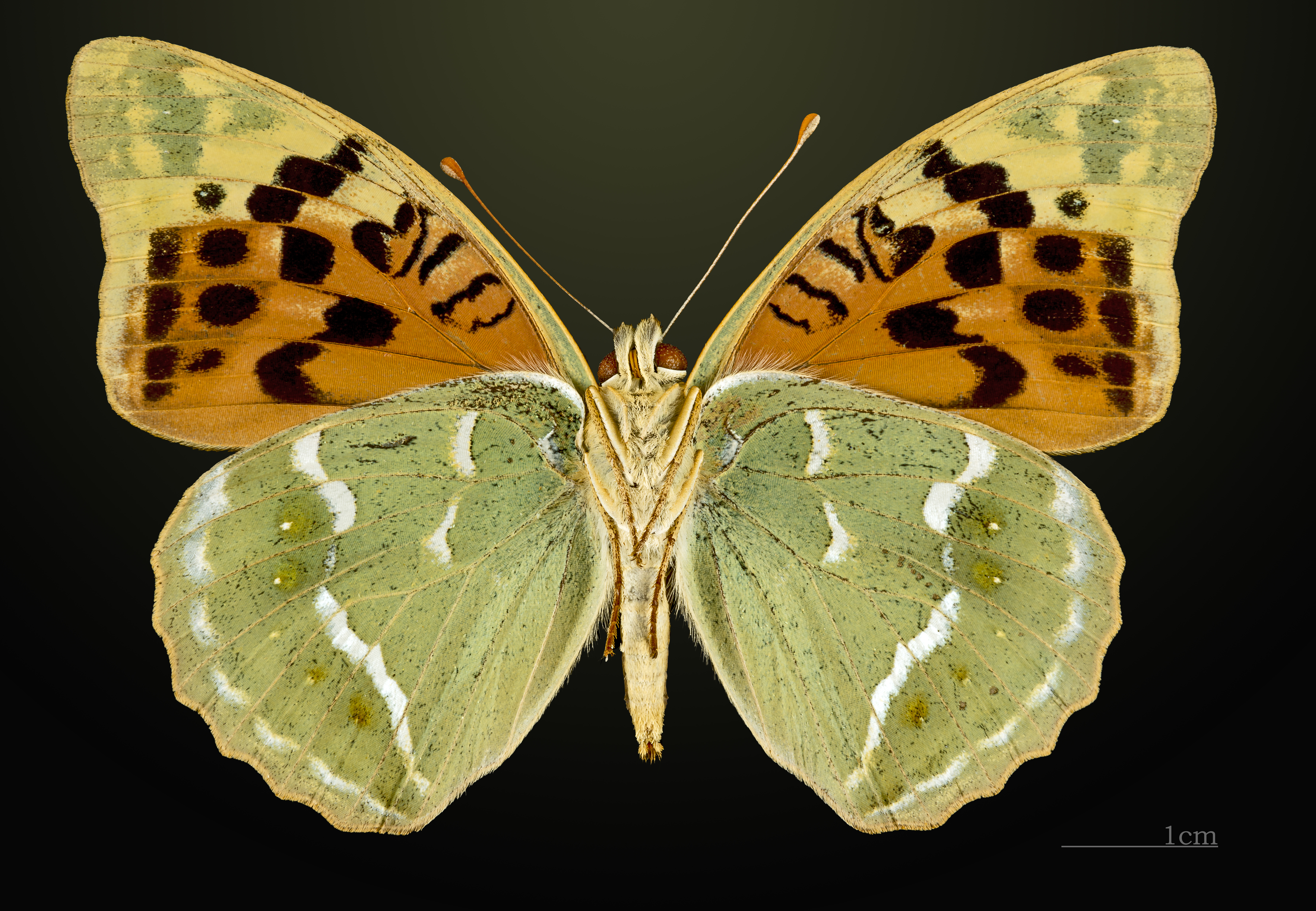
Female underside

== Etymology ==
Named in the Classical tradition, Pandora - "endowed with all gifts" - is a woman created by Hephaestus from clay. Despite the ban, she opened Pandora's box, from which disasters spread, from which humanity still suffers. Only Hope remained at the bottom of the vessel.
