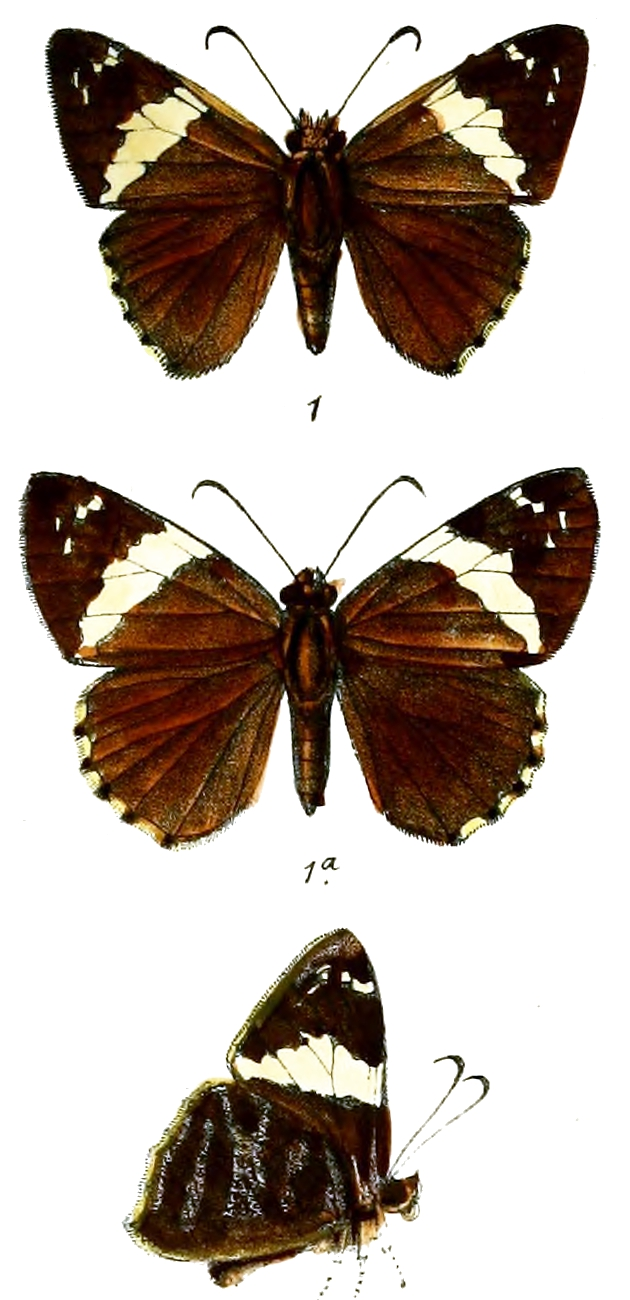
- Lobocla liliana

Scientific classification
- Kingdom: Animalia
- Phylum: Arthropoda
- Clade: Pancrustacea
- Class: Insecta
- Order: Lepidoptera
- Family: Hesperiidae
- Subtribe: Loboclina
- Genus: Lobocla; Moore, 1884

= Lobocla =

Genus of butterflies

Lobocla is a genus of skippers in the family Hesperiidae subfamily Eudaminae, within which they are placed in subtribe Loboclina. Unlike the rest of the Eudaminae, which have a New World distribution, the genus is endemic to Asia.

== Species ==
Li et al. 2019 gives the following species and subspecies for this genus:

- Lobocla aborica (Tytler, 1915) – India
  - Lobocla aborica aborica (Tytler, 1915)
  - Lobocla aborica tonka Evans, 1949
  - Lobocla aborica zesta Evans, 1949
- Lobocla bifasciatus (Bremer & Grey, 1853) – Indochina, China, Korea, Ussuri.
- Lobocla contractus (Leech, 1894) – China
- Lobocla disparalis Murayama, 1995
- Lobocla germanus (Oberthür, 1886) – China
- Lobocla liliana (Atkinson, 1871) – type species (Note: as Plesioneura liliana Atkinson, 1871)
  - Lobocla liliana ignatius (Plötz, 1882)
  - Lobocla liliana liliana (Atkinson, 1871)
- Lobocla nepos (Oberthür, 1886) – western China
  - Lobocla nepos nepos (Oberthür, 1886)
  - Lobocla nepos phyllis (Hemming, 1933)
- Lobocla proximus (Leech, 1891) – western China, Tibet
- Lobocla quadripunctata Fan & Wang, 2004
- Lobocla simplex (Leech, 1891) – western China

== Notes and references ==
- Natural History Museum Lepidoptera genus database
