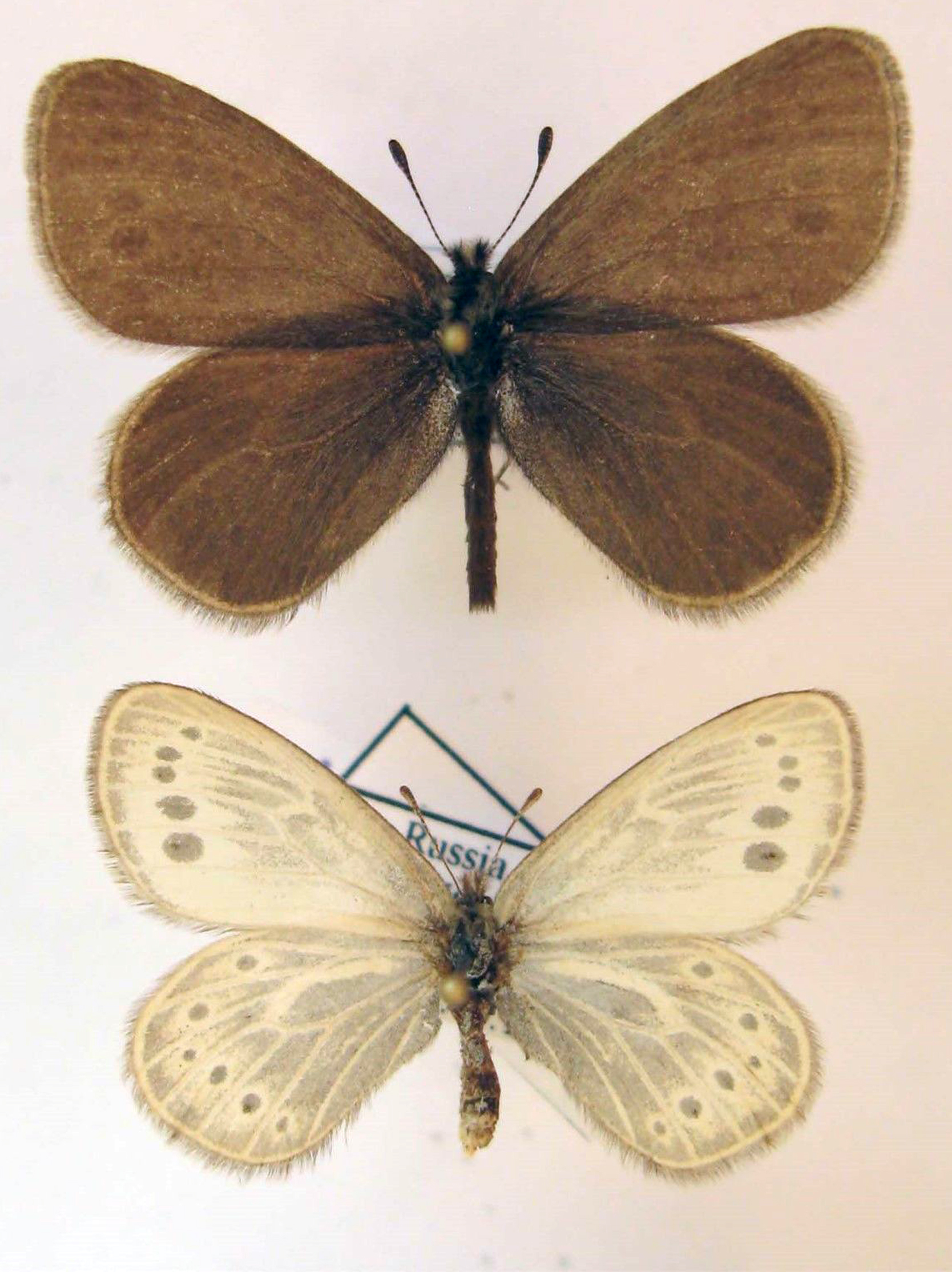
- Triphysa nervosa glacialis Female and Male

Scientific classification
- Kingdom: Animalia
- Phylum: Arthropoda
- Clade: Pancrustacea
- Class: Insecta
- Order: Lepidoptera
- Family: Nymphalidae
- Tribe: Satyrini
- Subtribe: Coenonymphina
- Genus: Triphysa; Zeller, 1850

Species
- See text

Synonyms
- Phryne Herrich-Schäffer, [1844]

= Triphysa =

Genus of butterflies

Triphysa is a genus of butterflies in the family Nymphalidae. The genus contains three species. The genus is sometimes included in Coenonympha.

== Species ==
- Triphysa dohrnii Zeller, 1850
- Triphysa nervosa Motschulsky, 1866
- Triphysa phryne (Pallas, 1771)
