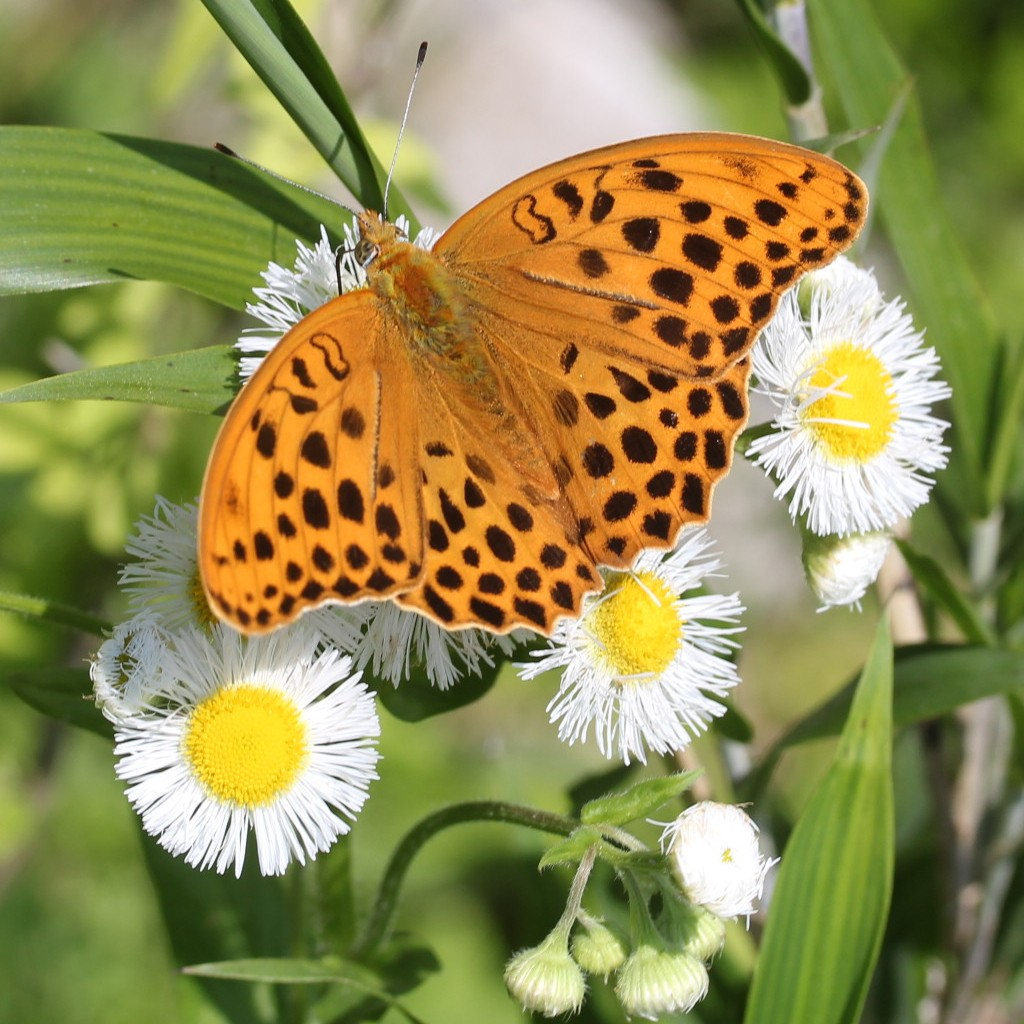
- Upper side of a male, in Japan.

Scientific classification
- Domain: Eukaryota
- Kingdom: Animalia
- Phylum: Arthropoda
- Class: Insecta
- Order: Lepidoptera
- Family: Nymphalidae
- Genus: Argynnis
- Species: A. anadyomene

Binomial name
- Argynnis anadyomene С.Felder & R.Felder, 1862

Synonyms
- Argynnis ella Bremer, 1864; Argynnis anadyomene obliterata Kardakoff, 1928; Argynnis midas Butler, 1866

= Argynnis anadyomene =

Species of butterfly

Argynnis anadyomene is a butterfly found in the East Palearctic (Amur, Ussuri, China, Korea) that belongs to the browns family.

== Subspecies ==
- A. a. anadyomene С.Felder & R.Felder, 1862 central China
- A. a. ella Bremer, 1864 Amur, Ussuri
- A. a. midas Butler, 1866 Japan
- A. a. prasoides Fruhstorfer, 1907 Korea

== Description from Seitz ==
A. anadyomene Fldr. (= ella Brem., midas Btlr.) (70d, 71b, c). At once recognizable by the peculiar shape of the hindwing, the costa is nearly straight, being almost without a trace of curvature. Above like laodice, leather-yellow, evenly dotted with black, the female bearing a white spot before the apex. The hindwing beneath is shaded with silvery grey, having a strong metallic green gloss and being without the distinct silver bands of paphia. Throughout Eastern Asia; first described from China, but also occurring in Tibet, Amurland, Corea and Japan, ab. crassipunctata Fruhst. are specimens with larger spots above, which occur among the otherwise very constant nymolypical form (Leech). — Specimens from the island of Tsushima Fruhstorfer names prasoides; the subapical spots on the forewing above of the male are smaller than in specimens from China and Japan; in the female the basal area of the upperside is more abundantly dusted with light green and the hindwing beneath has a deeper sea-green tinge. — The species is very abundant in most localities in the warmer districts of Eastern Asia, but does not appear to go very far north; though being still plentiful on Askold, it is according to Graeser already rare near Wladiwostock, which is hardly further north. They fly somewhat later than sagana; in October I still found worn males and numerous females together with true autumnal species such as Vanessa glauconia, species of Catocala and Arhopala. They closely resemble on the wing the dark paphia female occurring there.

== See also ==
- List of butterflies of Russia
