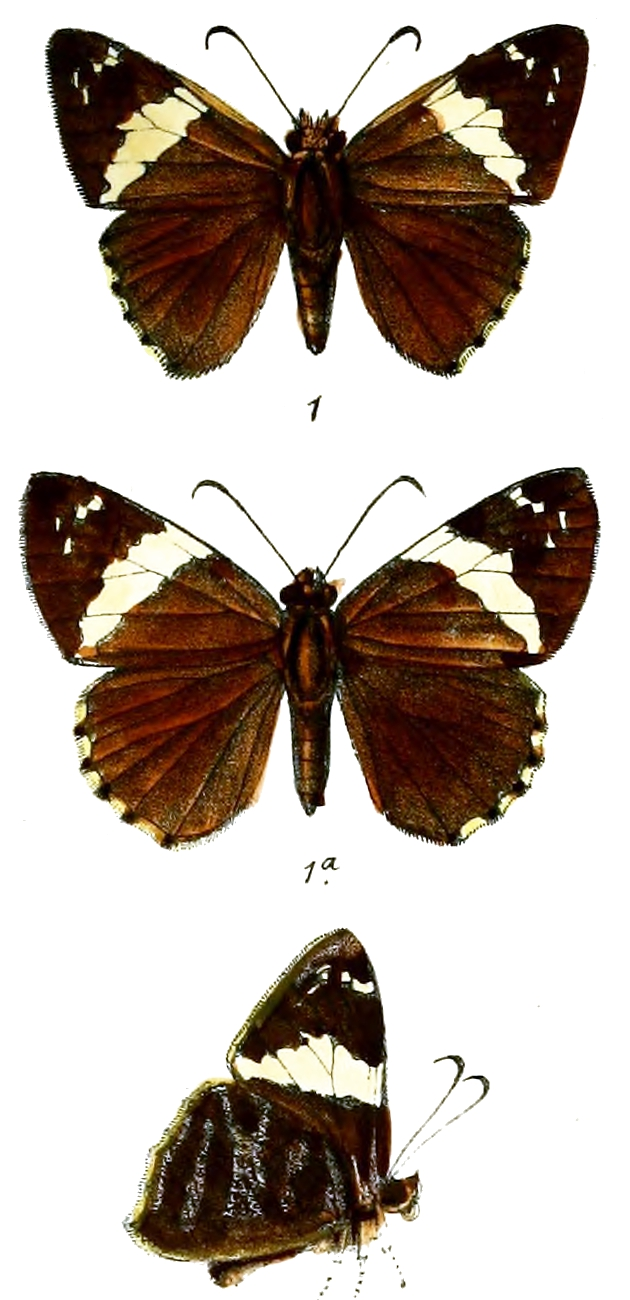
- From top: male, female, male underside

Scientific classification
- Kingdom: Animalia
- Phylum: Arthropoda
- Class: Insecta
- Order: Lepidoptera
- Family: Hesperiidae
- Genus: Lobocla
- Species: L. liliana

Binomial name
- Lobocla liliana (Atkinson, 1871)

= Lobocla liliana =

Species of butterfly

Lobocla liliana, commonly known as the marbled flat, is a species of hesperiid butterfly which is found in the Indomalayan realm.

== Range ==
The butterfly occurs in India, Myanmar, Thailand, Laos, north Vietnam and west China (Yunnan). In India, the butterfly ranges from the Himalayas, Sikkim and Assam eastwards to the Karen Hills in Myanmar.

== Status ==
Common.

== See also ==
- Hesperiidae
- List of butterflies of India (Hesperiidae)
