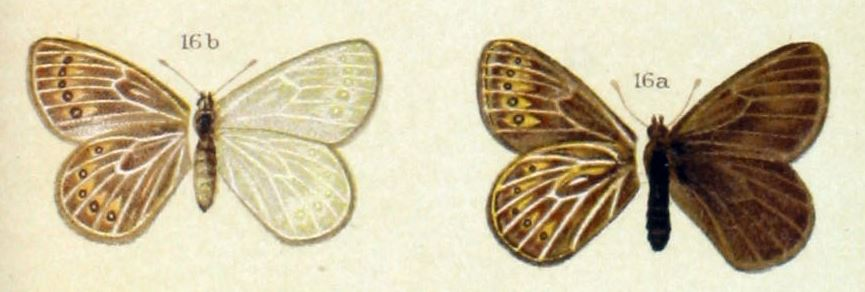
- Coenonympha phryne, syn. Triphysa phryne

Scientific classification
- Kingdom: Animalia
- Phylum: Arthropoda
- Clade: Pancrustacea
- Class: Insecta
- Order: Lepidoptera
- Family: Nymphalidae
- Genus: Triphysa
- Species: T. phryne

Binomial name
- Triphysa phryne (Pallas, 1771)

Synonyms
- Papilio phryne Pallas, 1771; Coenonympha phryne; Papilio tircis Stoll, [1782]

= Triphysa phryne =

Siberian brown

Species of butterfly

Triphysa phryne (Siberian brown) is a butterfly of the family Nymphalidae. It is found from southern Ukraine to the Altai. The habitat consists of steppe and semi-deserts.

The wingspan is 30–38 mm.

The species was found in 2010 to be critically endangered.

== Description in Seitz ==
T. phryne Pall. (= tyrcis Cr.) (48 i) is blackish brown-grey, the wings of the male having a fine golden margin. Between the veins on the underside there is a row of submarginal ocelli, which in the female shine through above. From South-Eastern Russia through Transcaucasia, Armenia and Western Siberia to Kuldscha and the Altai. – In the form biocellata Stgr. two ocelli of the underside shine through above, where they sometimes appear as pupilled ocelli, and in striatula Elw. [var.] there are distinct light veins even on the upperside of the wings and the row of ocelli on the underside is surrounded with pale scaling and is thus placed in a kind of light band. – Nothing is known to me about the early life-history of Triphysa. They are insects of the steppes, where they appear in June and July, and are locally not rare. The females seem to fly very little, and are not even easily disturbed; the males fly low down over the ground, probing one tuft of grass after another: when disturbed they fly up a few yards into the air but soon come down again to the ground.

== Biology ==
Adults are on wing from April or May to July or from June to July in the mountains.

The larvae feed on Stipa species. The species overwinters in the pupal stage.

== Etymology ==
Named in the Classical tradition.Phryne was an ancient Greek beauty from Thespiae
