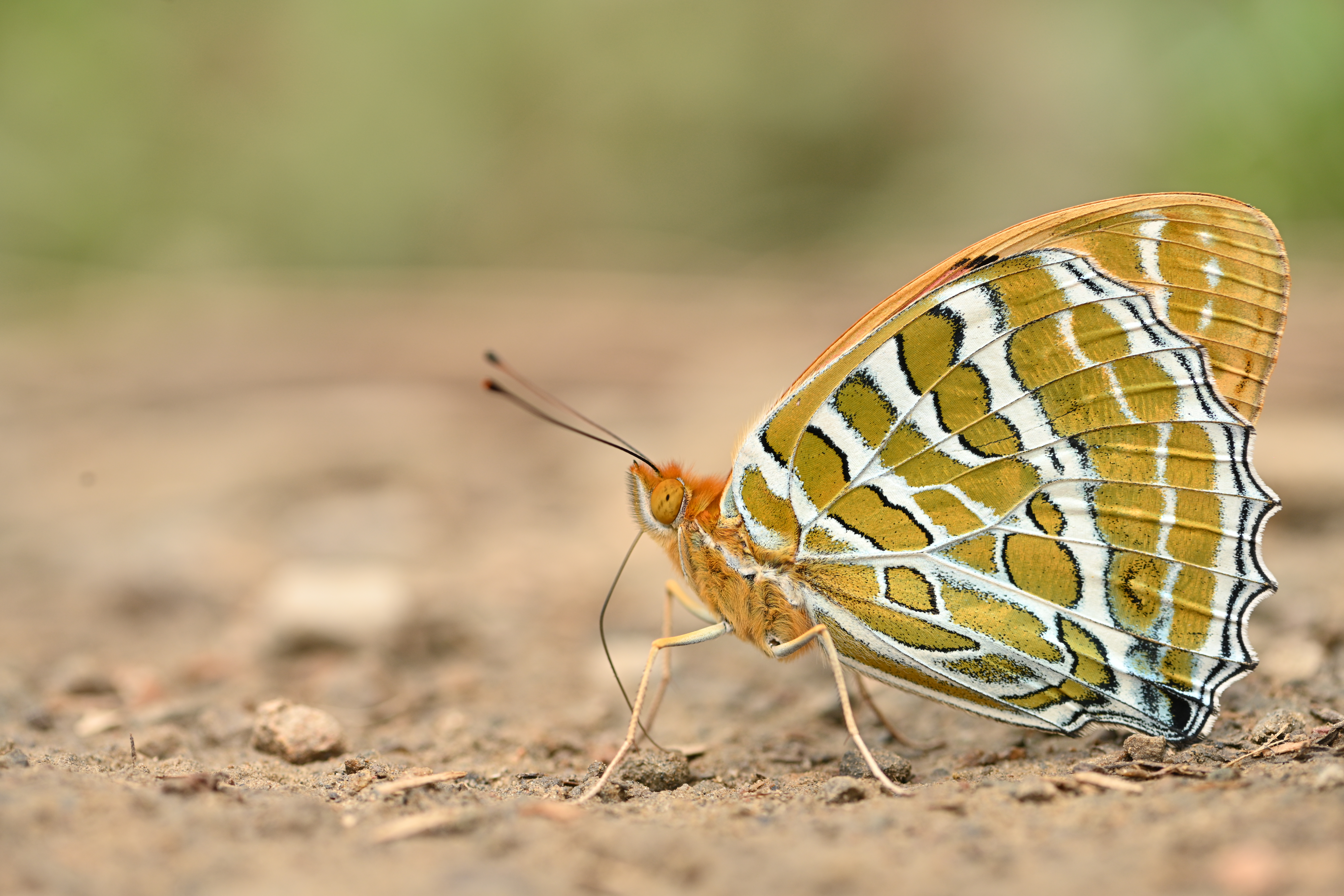
- Closewing position of Argynnis childreni
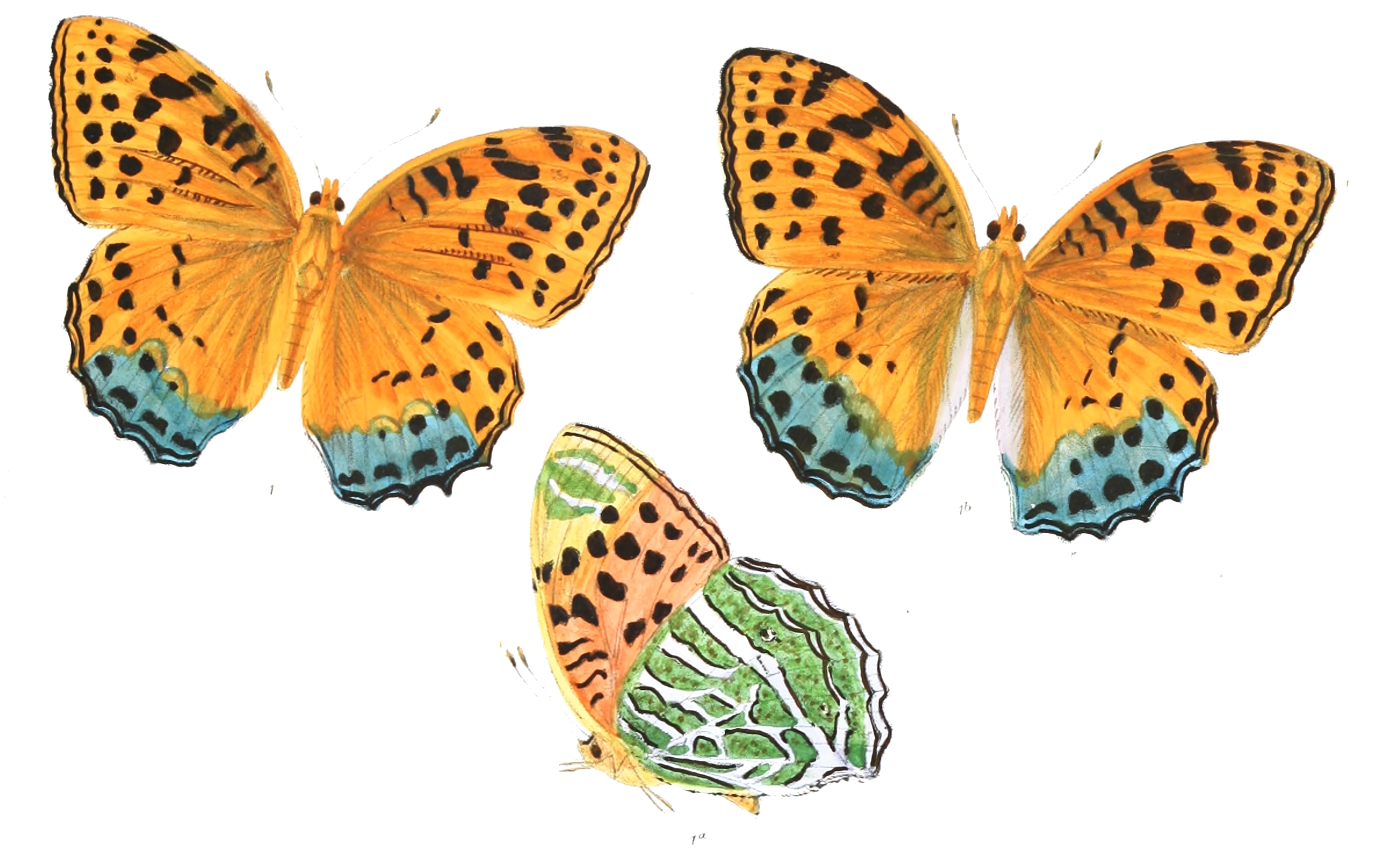

Scientific classification
- Kingdom: Animalia
- Phylum: Arthropoda
- Clade: Pancrustacea
- Class: Insecta
- Order: Lepidoptera
- Family: Nymphalidae
- Genus: Argynnis
- Species: A. childreni

Binomial name
- Argynnis childreni Gray, 1831

Synonyms
- Childrena childreni (Gray, 1831)

= Argynnis childreni =

Species of butterfly

Argynnis childreni, the large silverstripe, is a species of nymphalid butterfly. It was first described by George Robert Gray in 1831 and named after John George Children. Also known as the Himalayan fritillary, it is found in mountainous areas, from Pakistan into China. Its wingspan is 8–9 centimetres (3.1–3.5 in). The forewings are predominantly orange with black spots, while the hindwings are brown with a blue margin, with many white stripes.
