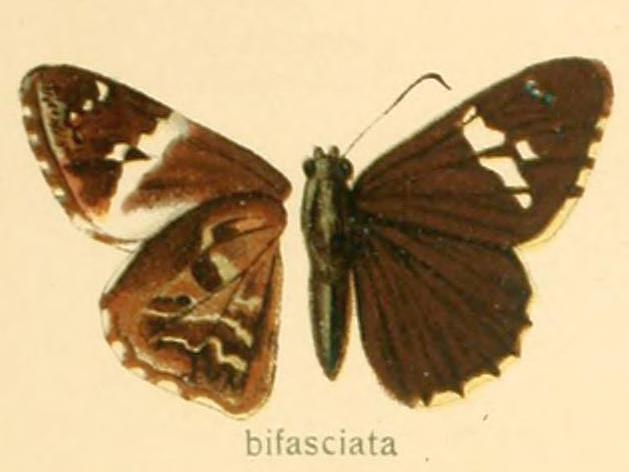
- Lobocla bifasciatus in Seitz 84b

Scientific classification
- Kingdom: Animalia
- Phylum: Arthropoda
- Class: Insecta
- Order: Lepidoptera
- Family: Hesperiidae
- Genus: Lobocla
- Species: L. bifasciatus

Binomial name
- Lobocla bifasciatus (Bremer & Grey, 1853)

= Lobocla bifasciatus =

Species of butterfly

Lobocla bifasciatus is a small species of butterfly found in the eastern Palearctic (Indochina - China - Korea, Ussuri) that belongs to the skipper family Hesperiidae.

== Description from Seitz ==
L. bifasciata Brem. (84 b). Wings dull greyish black. The forewing with a transparent white band composed of five spots, which are separated by the veins; it ends before vein 1. The underside of the forewing is greyish lilac before the three apical spots. The hindwing beneath bears three but little prominent bands, the outer margin being dusted with lilac grey before the fringes. The species occurs throughout northern Asia with the exception of the high north: Korea, Amur, northern China.

== See also ==
- List of butterflies of Russia
