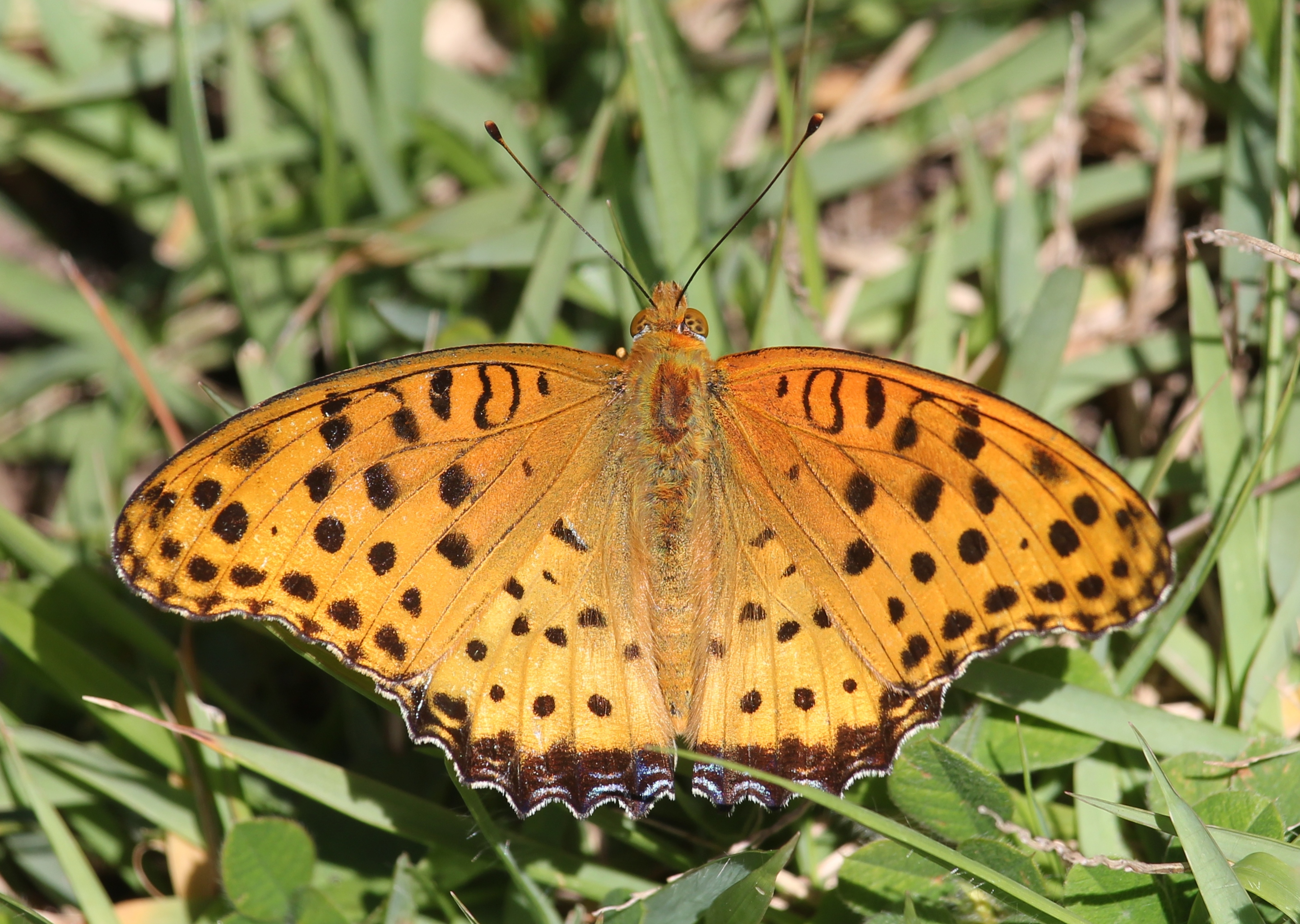

Scientific classification
- Kingdom: Animalia
- Phylum: Arthropoda
- Clade: Pancrustacea
- Class: Insecta
- Order: Lepidoptera
- Family: Nymphalidae
- Genus: Argynnis
- Species: A. hyperbius

Binomial name
- Argynnis hyperbius (Linnaeus, 1763)

Synonyms
- Papilio hyperbius Linnaeus 1763; Argyreus hyperbius; Papilio niphe Linnaeus, 1767; Papilio argyrius Linnaeus, 1768; Papilio tigris Jung, 1792; Argynnis tephania Godart, 1819; Argynnis aruna Moore, [1858]; Argynnis hybrida Evans, 1912; Argynnis montorum Joicey & Talbot, 1926; Argynnis (Dryas) castetsoides Reuss, 1926; Argynnis coomani Le Cerf, 1933; Argynnis castetsi Oberthür, 1891; Argynnis niphe javanica Oberthür, 1889; Argynnis inconstans Butler, 1873

= Argynnis hyperbius =

Indian fritillary

Species of butterfly

The Indian fritillary (Argynnis hyperbius) is a species of butterfly of the nymphalid or brush-footed family. It is usually found from northeast, south and southeast Asia to Australia.

== Description ==
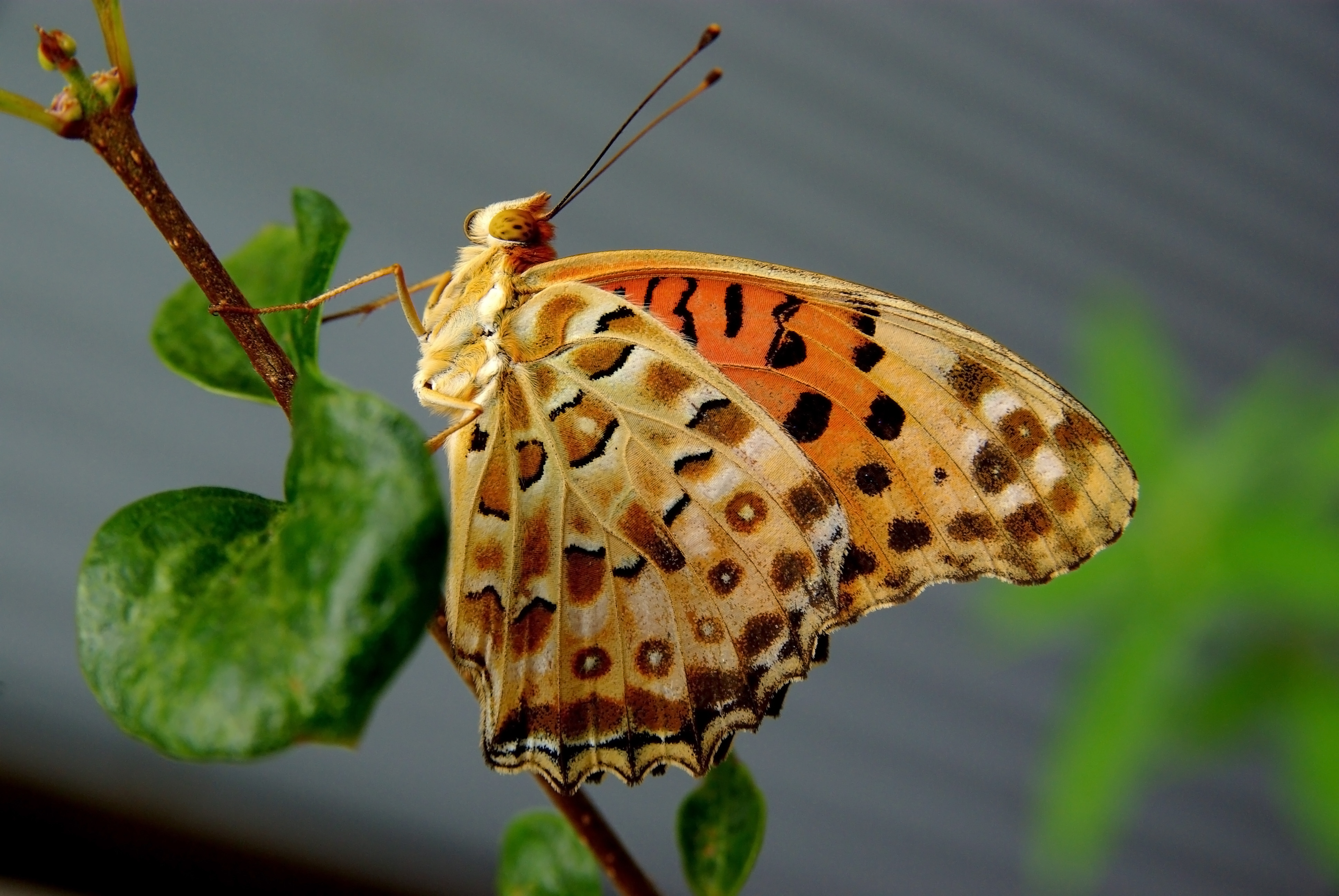
Underside of wings

Male: Upperside: forewing rich orange yellow, hindwing paler yellow, with the following black markings: Forewing: cell with a basal short transverse streak, a medial broad oval loop, its outer margin sinuous; a broad transverse streak beyond cell not reaching the median nervure; a broad streak along the discocellulars; a zigzag discal series of large spots, angulated outwardly in interspace 4, inwardly in interspace 2, a minute spot at base of interspace 1; a somewhat diffuse large postdiscal spot below the costa in interspace 6; a postdiscal sinuous series of round spots, those in interspaces 1 and 4 very small; an inner complete subterminal sinuous series of round spots; an outer subterminal line, widening on the veins, and a terminal slender line. Hindwing: a basal, transverse, obscure narrow mark in cell, another above it in interspace 7, a transverse lunule across the middle of the cell; a small spot outwardly bordering the lower discocellular; a discal series of transverse spots from interspaces 1 to 7, sinuous posteriorly; a postdiscal series of five spots in interspaces 2 to 6; a subterminal series of somewhat lunular spots; finally, a narrow band on term en traversed posteriorly by a series of blue, anteriorly by a series of ochraceous lunules. Underside forewing pale terracotta red, shading into ochraceous towards the apex, the apex broadly suffused with that colour; markings as on the upperside, with the following exceptions: subcostal spot in interspace 6, upper two spots of postdiscal series, upper four spots of the inner subterminal series, and the anterior portions of the outer subterminal and of the terminal line olivaceous brown; the upper two postdiscal spots centred with white, with a white spot on each side; the upper four spots of the sub terminal series connate (united), forming a short curved band. Hindwing variegated with ochraceous, olivaceous-brown and silvery-white markings, the last for the most part narrowly margined on the outer side by short black lines; the veins prominently pale ochraceous; the medial silvery markings form a well-marked sinuous discal series, followed by a curved postdiscal series of five olivaceous round spots; each spot and the olivaceous-brown quadrate patch near base of cell with a minute white central spot; a slender black subterminal line widening at the veins, as on the forewing, followed by an ochraceous narrow lunular band and an outer slender black anteciliary line; the subterminal black line margined on the inner side by a series of: slender white lunules, bordered inwardly by a series of broad olivaceous-brown markings in the interspaces. Antennae brown above, ochraceous red beneath; head, thorax and abdomen olivescent tawny; beneath, palpi, thorax and abdomen pale ochraceous.

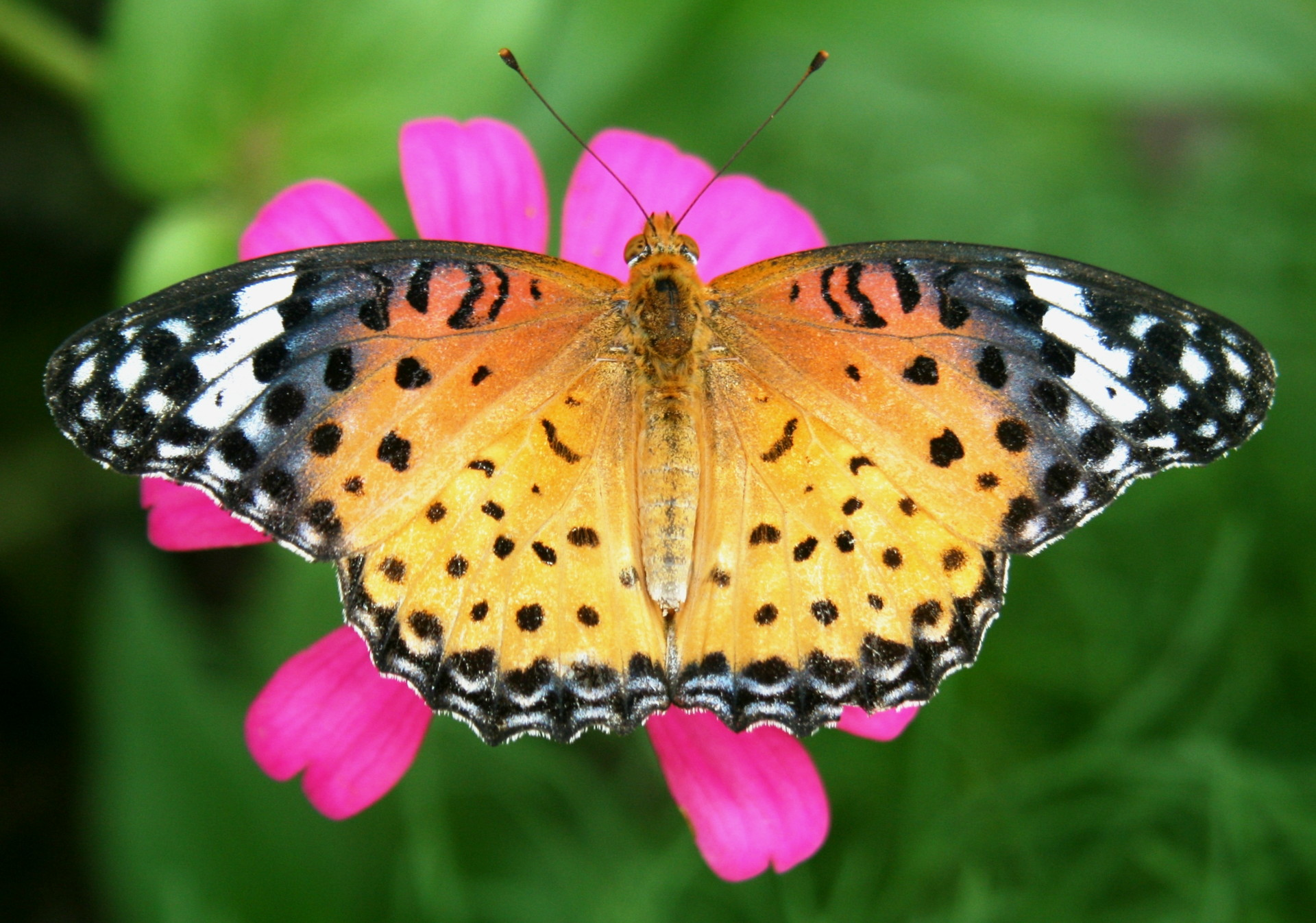
Female

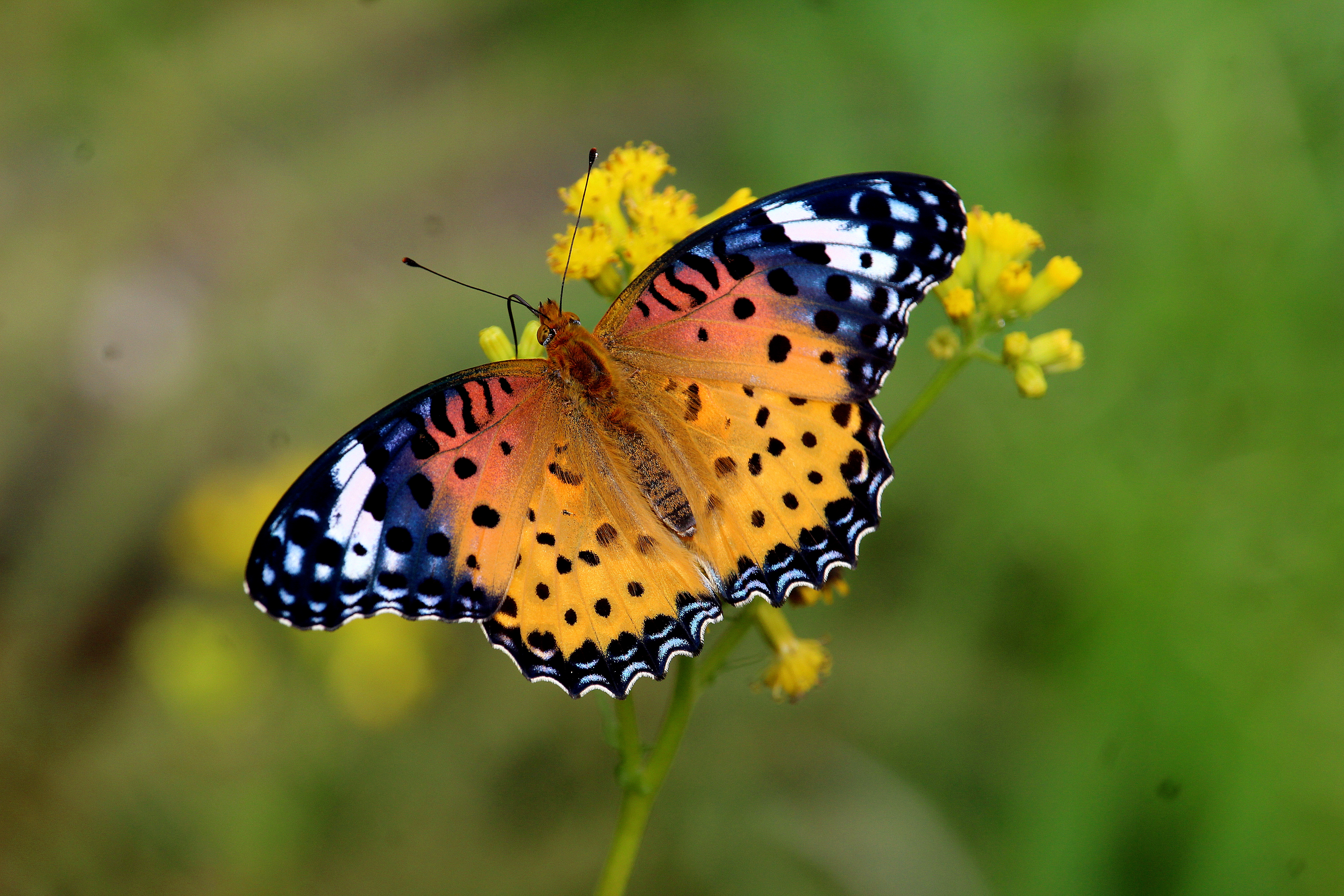
Female

in Japan

Female similar. Differs from the male as follows: Upperside: apical half of forewing from about the middle of the costa obliquely to just above the tornus black, inwardly suffused with purple, crossed by a broad white band from costa to the subterminal series of black spots; four preapical white spots, the upper three bordering on each side and above a very obscure ocellus scarcely visible on the black background, an inner and an outer subterminal transverse series of slender white lunules. Underside: forewing markings similar to those on the upperside, but the apex of the wing beyond the white oblique band ochraceous green. Hindwing as in the male, but the markings slightly broader. Antennae, head, thorax and abdomen as in the male, the abdomen paler beneath.

Wingspan: 80–98 mm (3.1–3.9 in).

Var. taprobana, Moore, is a slightly darker race from Ceylon, with markings similar in both sexes to those of hyperbius. Moore, however, states that taprobana is an intermediate between the south Indian form (castetsi) and typical hyperbius specimens from Ceylon that do not differ from upper India, Assam, and Burmese specimens, except in the very slightly darker ground colour on the upperside.

Race castetsi, Oberthur: The females of this remarkable form seem to be locally dimorphic. Male closely resembles the male of hyperbius but differs as follows: Upperside: ground colour a richer brighter shade of orange yellow; black markings similar but distinctly smaller, of a deeper black: subterminal transverse series of slender lunules traversing the terminal black margin on the hindwing of the same shade of orange yellow as the ground colour, not blue on the posterior half of the wing. Underside: the olivaceous brown at apex of forewing and variegating the hindwing more of a greenish golden tint. A sex-mark of specialized raised scales along middle of vein 1 on the upperside of the forewing very prominent.

Female Nilgiri form: resembles the female of typical hyperbius differs as follows: Upperside: ground colour pale golden yellow; basal half of both forewings and hindwings shaded with metallic green in the forewing; in some specimens this tint is slightly olivaceous; black markings and the white oblique band on the apical area of the forewing as in hyperbius, but proportionately smaller, the purplish-blue shading along inner margin of the white band much less conspicuous, as is also the bluish tint; on the white preapical spots and subterminal markings on the forewing and on the posterior half of the subterminal line of limules on the hindwing. Underside as in hyperbius but the ground colour on the forewing a paler shade of terracotta red; the olivaceous brown variegating the hindwing of a distinctly greener tint.

Female typical form as described from Trichinopoly. Similar to the male differs as follows: Upperside: ground colour pale golden yellow; basal half of the wings suffused with dark olivaceous green; black markings as in the male but larger; on the forewing the spots of the subterminal series very large, coalescent or nearly coalescent with one another and with the dentate spots on the veins in the inner terminal line; the upper two spots also of the postdiscal series very large and coalescent, the upper of the two joining on above and below to the inner postdiscal lunate spot in interspace 6, thus enclosing a prominent lunule of the ground colour. Underside as in the male but paler.

=== Larva ===
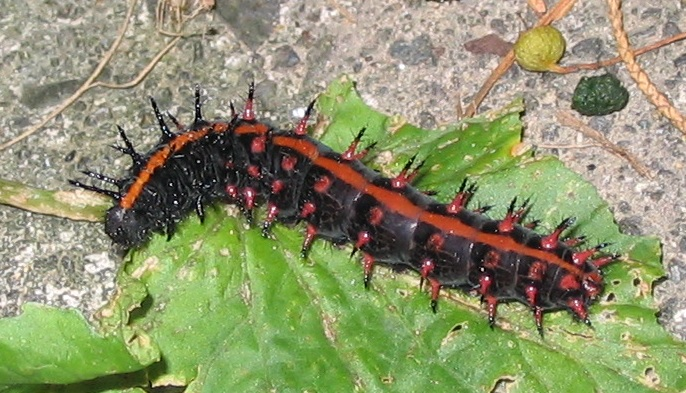
Larva

The head, legs and body are black; but this colour is obscured by orange-tawny markings. It also has a wide orange-tawny dorsal stripe. The head has four straight horizontal simple black spines, black spines on pectoral segments, pink spines with black tips on abdominal segments, and pink spines with faint black tips on caudal segments.

=== Pupa ===
"Head and wing-cases pale Indian red; ten pale metallic spots on back; abdomen dark pink; spines faintly black-tipped." (A. Graham, fide de Nicéville) Mr. de Nicéville adds: "The head ends in two well-separated blunt points; there are a pair of spines anteriorly, another in the middle, and a third smallest pair posteriorly on the thorax, the latter being hunched and keeled, on the abdominal segments there are eight pairs of spines, the third anterior pair the largest." (Butt. Ind. ii, p. 131.)

== Distribution ==
The Himalayas, in the outer ranges from Campbellpur in the Punjab to Sikkim; Oudh; Agra; Manbhum in Bengal; Assam, the Khasi Hills; Upper Burma; extending to China and Taiwan; Sumatra; Java. Can also be found in southern Japan. In Australia, range restricted to northern NSW and southern Queensland.

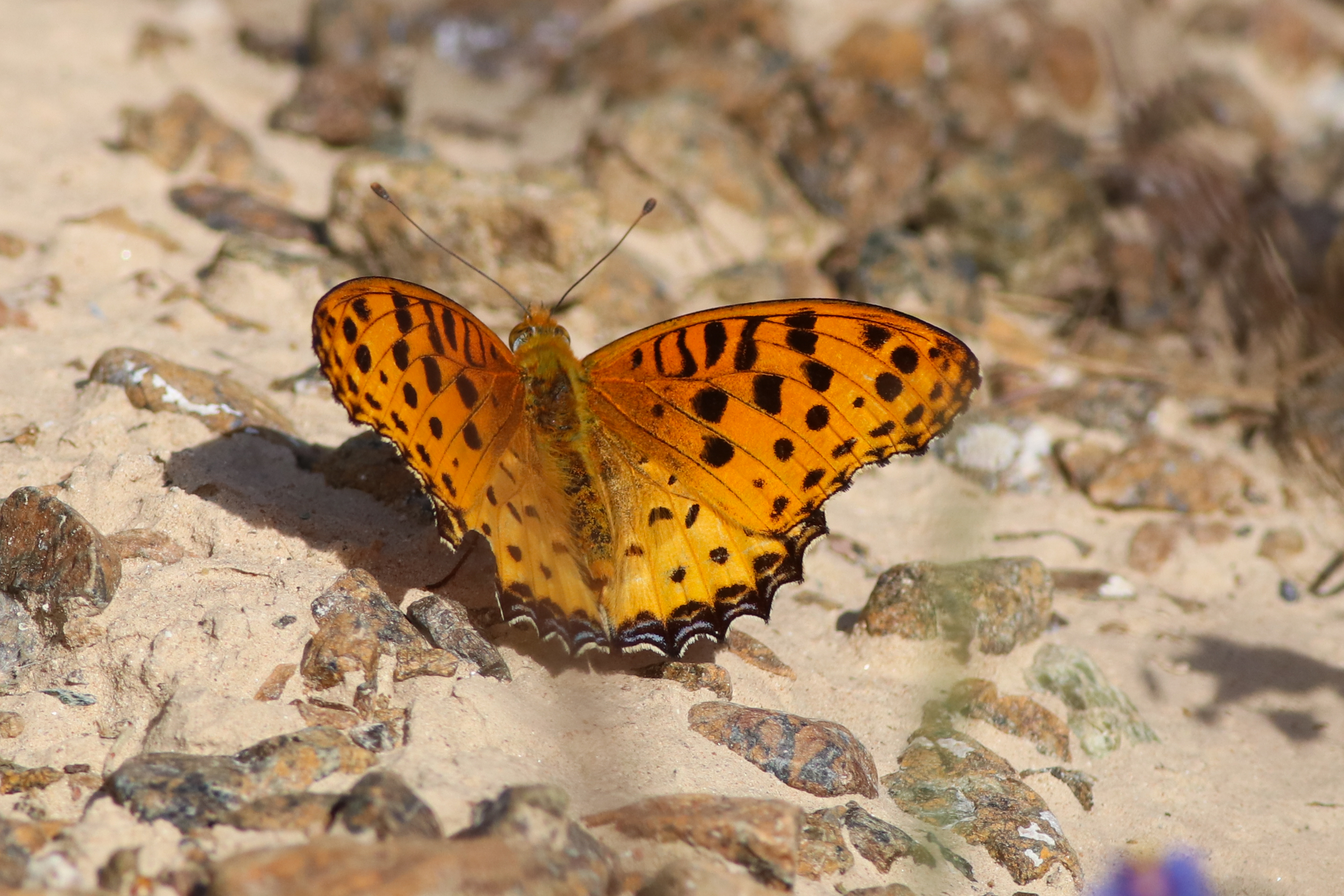
Argynnis hyperbius from Wadi Wurrayah, United Arab Emirates

The species was observed for the first time in the United Arab Emirates in January 2020, in Wadi Wurayah National Park, in the Hajar Mountains within the Emirate of Fujairah: a few Indian fritillaries were found flying with members of a physically similar species, the Plain tiger (Danaus chrysippus). It is thought that they came there as opportunistic migrants because of the suitable conditions created by abundant rainfall in the country since October 2019, and that they would not stay for the summer.

== Taxonomy ==
This species is sometimes assigned its own genus, Argyreus. This genus is now mostly treated as a synonym of Argynnis however.

== Subspecies ==
- A. h. hyperbius (central India to northern India, Assam to China and Taiwan)
- A. h. castetsi (Oberthür, 1891) (Palani hills and hills in Travancore[])
- A. h. hybrida (Nilgiri hills, Chamarajanagar district of Karnataka, to the hills in the Malabar region of Kerala)
- A. h. centralis (Martin, 1913) (Sulawesi)
- A. h. inconstans (Butler, 1873) (Queensland to New South Wales, Papua, New Guinea)
- A. h. javanica (Oberthür, 1889) (Java)
- A. h. neumanni Rothschild, 1902 (Ethiopia)
- A. h. niugini Samson, 1976 (Papua)
- A. h. sumatrensis (Fruhstorfer, 1903) (Thailand, Peninsular Malaysia, Sumatra)
- A. h. taprobana (Moore, 1900) (Sri Lanka)
- A. h. sagada (Fruhstorfer, 1912) (Philippines)

== See also ==
- List of butterflies of India
- List of butterflies of India (Nymphalidae)
- Mimicry
