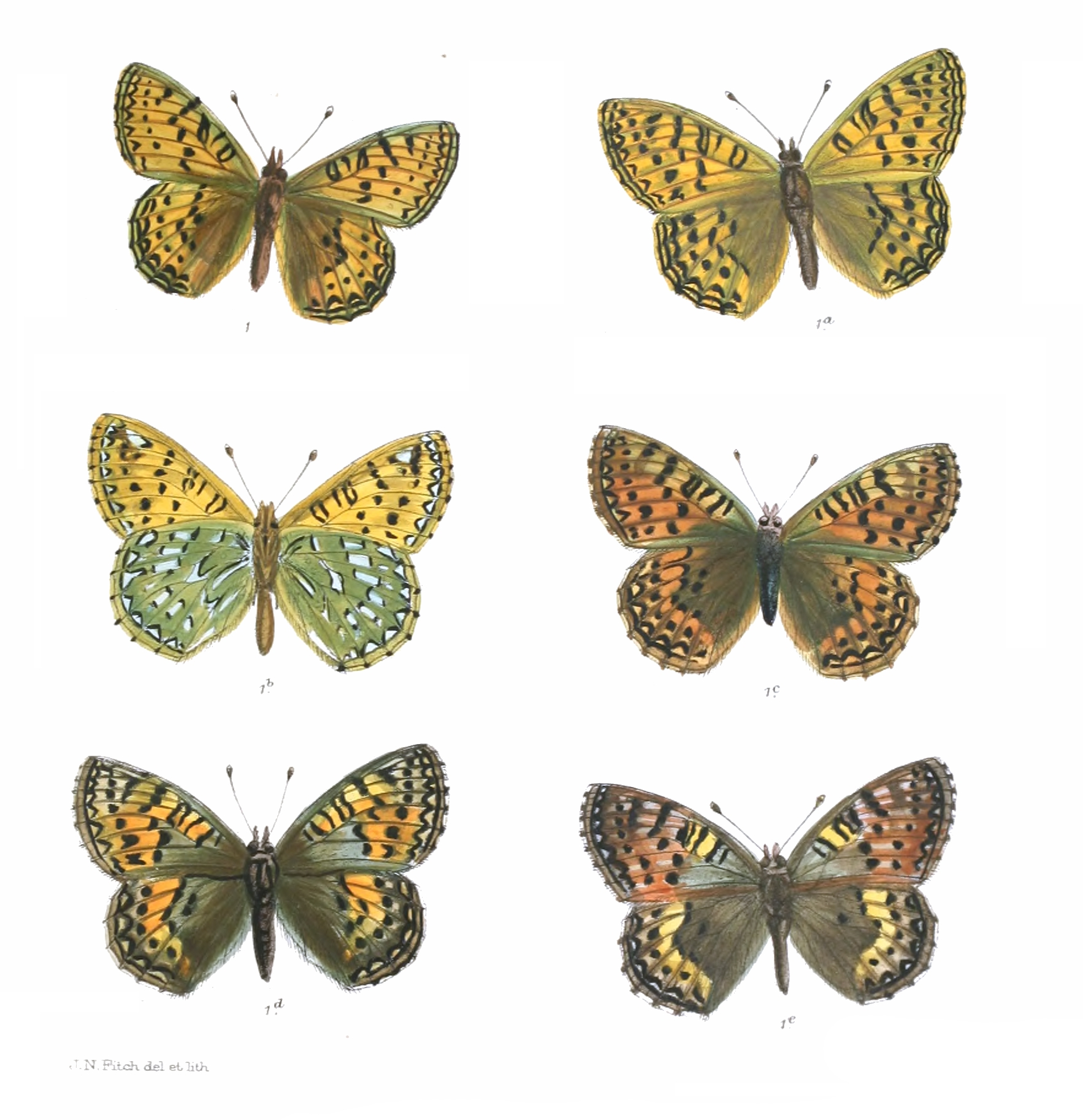

Scientific classification
- Domain: Eukaryota
- Kingdom: Animalia
- Phylum: Arthropoda
- Class: Insecta
- Order: Lepidoptera
- Family: Nymphalidae
- Genus: Speyeria
- Species: S. clara

Binomial name
- Speyeria clara (Blanchard, [1844])

Synonyms
- Argynnis clara Blanchard, [1844]; Mesoacidalia clara (Blanchard, [1844])

= Speyeria clara =

Species of butterfly

Speyeria clara is a species of fritillary butterfly of the family Nymphalidae. It has an eastern range in the Palearctic realm – the Himalayas, Tibet, Kashmir, Sikkim. Speyeria clara was first described by Émile Blanchard in 1844.
