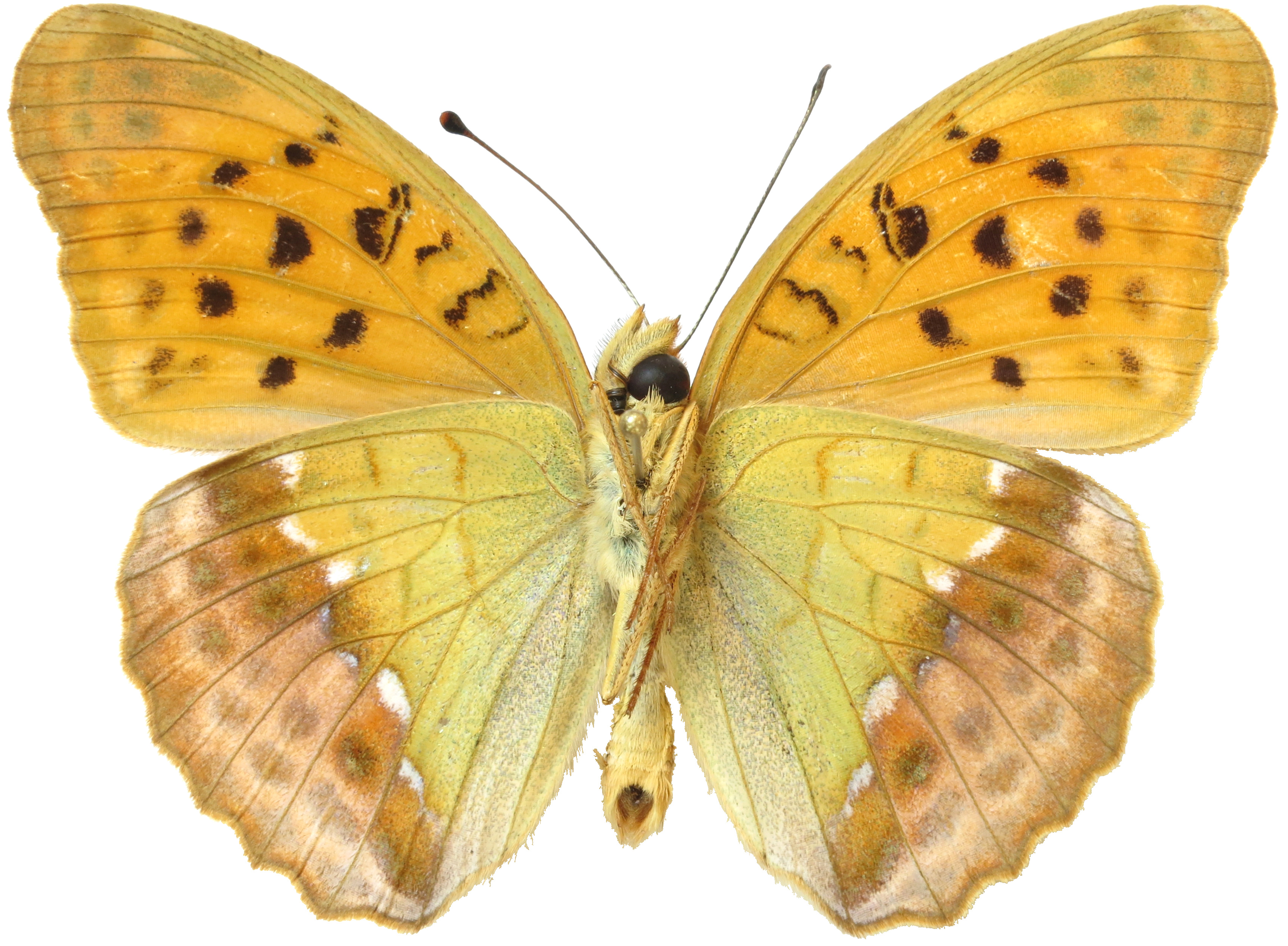
- Male - ventral side, Primorsky Krai, Russia

Scientific classification
- Domain: Eukaryota
- Kingdom: Animalia
- Phylum: Arthropoda
- Class: Insecta
- Order: Lepidoptera
- Family: Nymphalidae
- Genus: Argynnis
- Species: A. ruslana

Binomial name
- Argynnis ruslana Motschulsky, 1866

Synonyms
- Argyronome ruslana (Motschulsky, 1866)

= Argynnis ruslana =

Species of butterfly

Argynnis ruslana is a species of butterfly in the family Nymphalidae. It is found in eastern China, Amurland, Korea, and Japan.

The larvae feed on Viola species.

== Subspecies ==
There are two recognised subspecies:

- Argynnis ruslana ruslana (Amur, Ussuri)
- Argynnis ruslana lysippe (Japan)

== Gallery ==
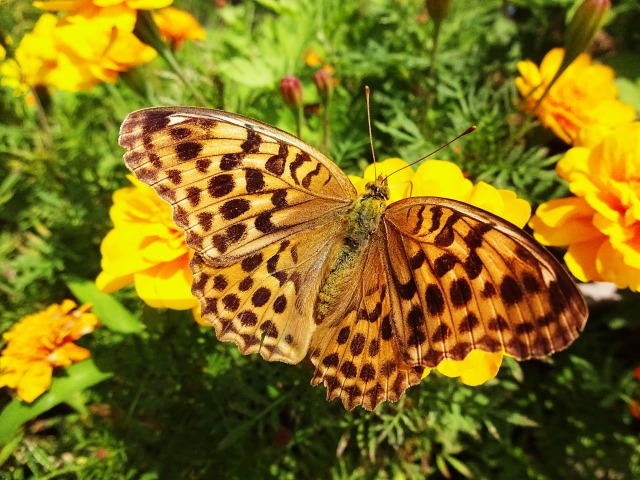
Upper side, in Tokyo.

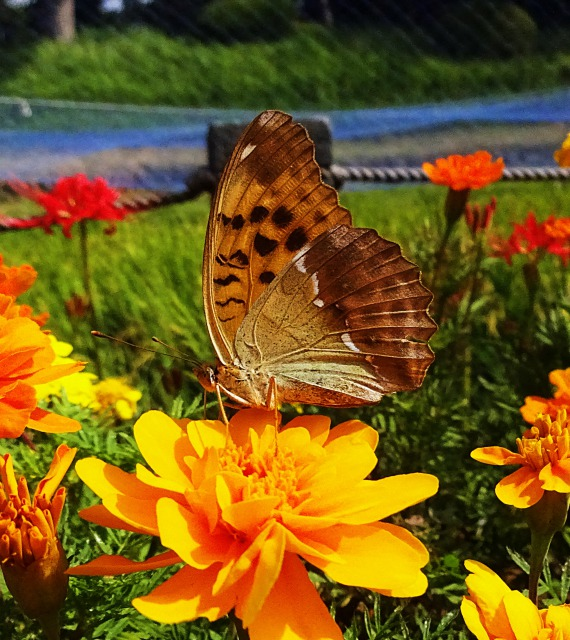
Lower side, in Tokyo.
