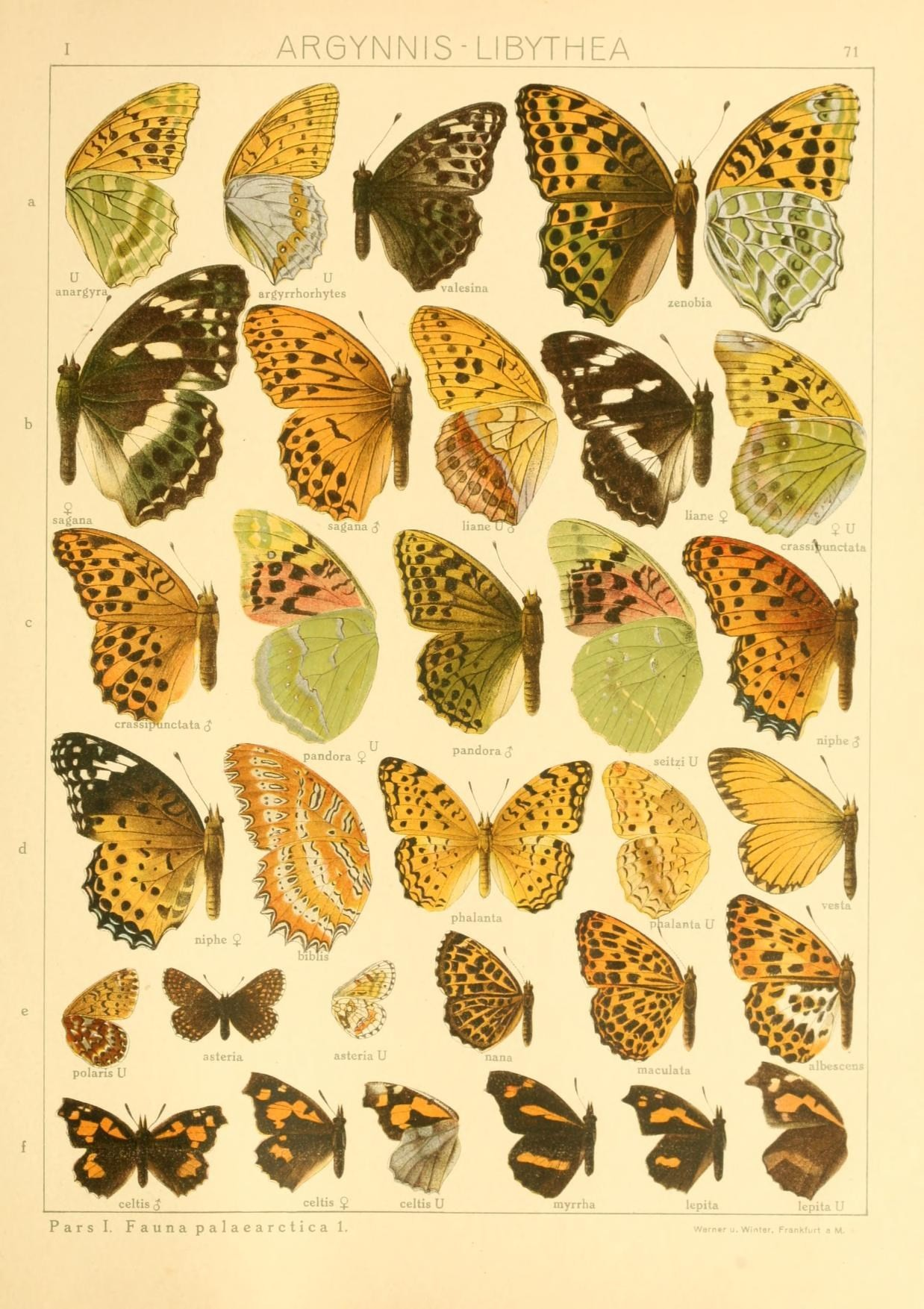
- Argynnis zenobia in Seitz 71a

Scientific classification
- Domain: Eukaryota
- Kingdom: Animalia
- Phylum: Arthropoda
- Class: Insecta
- Order: Lepidoptera
- Family: Nymphalidae
- Genus: Argynnis
- Species: A. zenobia

Binomial name
- Argynnis zenobia Leech, 1890

Synonyms
- Childrena zenobia; Argynnis penelope Staudinger, [1892]

= Argynnis zenobia =

Species of butterfly

Argynnis zenobia is a butterfly found in the East Palearctic (Amur, Ussuri, China, Tibet) that belongs to the browns family.

== Subspecies ==
- A. z. zenobia China, Tibet
- A. z. penelope (Staudinger, [1892]) South Ussuri

== Description from Seitz ==
zenobia Leech (71a). Smaller than the previous species [A.childreni], particularly the hindwing less large. Shape and upperside almost exactly as in paphia; fiery reddish yellow, the male with black scent-streaks on the two median branches. The underside as in childreni, but the silverbands anastomose in several places. In North and West China and Tibet. — In penelope Stgr. the male has 3 scent-streaks instead of 2 on the forewing, and the female is shaded with dull greyish green nearly as in the valesina-female of paphia. On the Sutchou, in Amurland and North China. — The butterflies are on the wing in June and July, not being rare in the south and west of the distribution-area, but very rare in the northern districts, on the Ussuri (Doerries).

== Biology ==
The larva feeds on Viola variegata.

== See also ==
- List of butterflies of Russia
