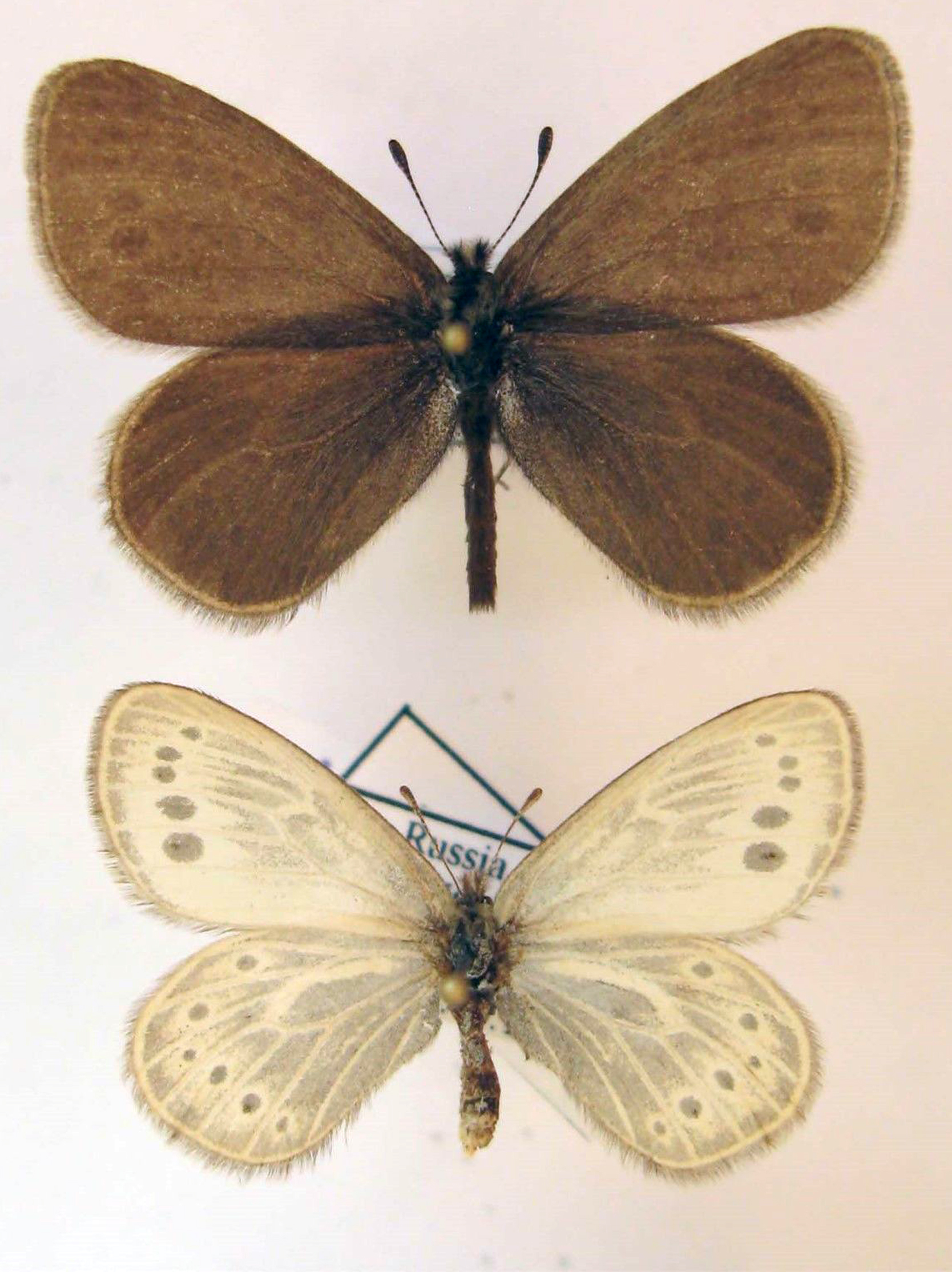
- Triphysa nervosa glacialis Female and Male

Scientific classification
- Domain: Eukaryota
- Kingdom: Animalia
- Phylum: Arthropoda
- Class: Insecta
- Order: Lepidoptera
- Family: Nymphalidae
- Genus: Triphysa
- Species: T. nervosa

Binomial name
- Triphysa nervosa Motschulsky, 1866

Synonyms
- Coenonympha nervosa; Triphysa albovenosa Erschoff, 1885; Triphysa phryne var. glacialis Bang-Haas, 1912

= Triphysa nervosa =

Species of butterfly

Triphysa nervosa is a butterfly of the family Nymphalidae. It is found in northern Transuralia, the mountains of southern Siberia, eastern Siberia, Amurland, the Russian Far East, Korea, northern and north-eastern China and Mongolia.

The wingspan is 15–18 mm. Seitz-nervosa Motsch. (= albovenosa Ersch.) (48 i) is very like phryne, but in both sexes without ocelli on the underside. Adults are on wing from May to June or June to July in the mountains.

The larvae feed on Carex species.

== Subspecies ==
- Triphysa nervosa nervosa (Transbaikalia and the Amur region)
- Triphysa nervosa sacha Korshunov, 1996 (Yakutia)
- Triphysa nervosa tscherskii Grum-Grshimailo, 1899 (Magadan, Chukot Peninsula)
- ?Triphysa nervosa biocelata Staudinger, 1901 (China)
