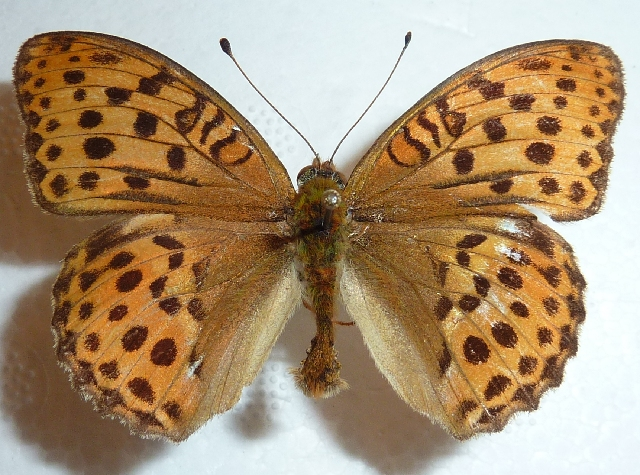

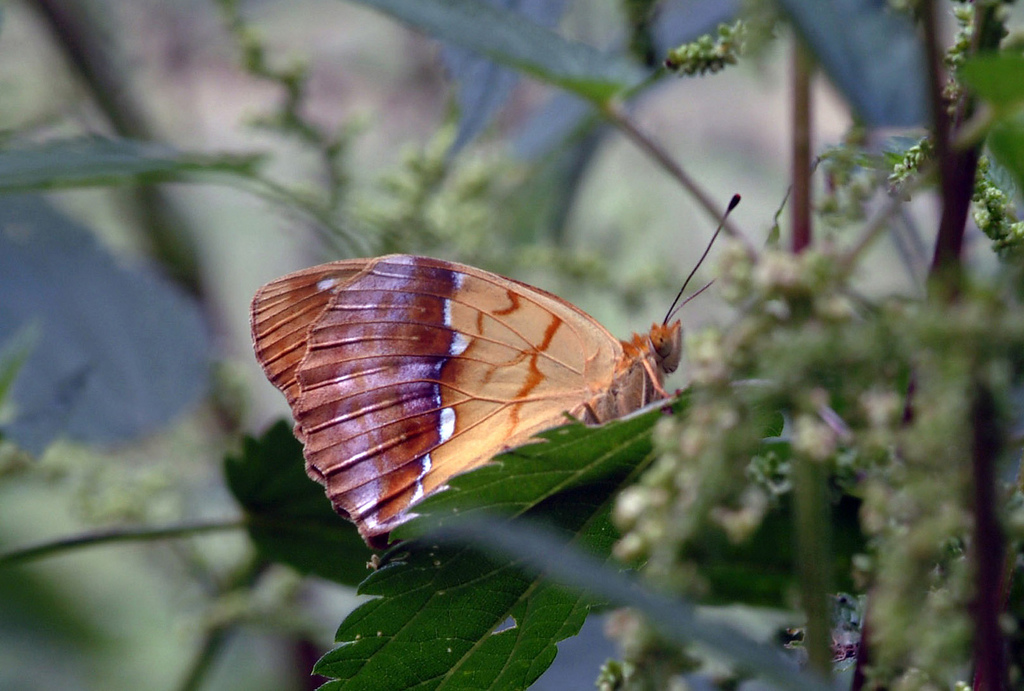

Scientific classification
- Domain: Eukaryota
- Kingdom: Animalia
- Phylum: Arthropoda
- Class: Insecta
- Order: Lepidoptera
- Family: Nymphalidae
- Genus: Argynnis
- Species: A. laodice

Binomial name
- Argynnis laodice (Pallas, 1771)

Synonyms
- Argyronome laodice

= Argynnis laodice =

Pallas' fritillary

Species of butterfly

Argynnis laodice, Pallas' fritillary, is a butterfly of the family Nymphalidae. It occurs in damp forested places in southern Scandinavia, Eastern Europe, northwestern Kazakhstan, and across the Palearctic to Siberia, Amur, Korea and Japan.

== Description ==
laodice Pall. (= cethosia Hbn.) (70a). Bright leather-yellow, the female with minute white spots before the apex of the forewing. Central and distal areas with very regular rows of round black dots. Underside without silver, a row of elongate white spots with an oily gloss separates on the hindwing the yellow proximal area which has a greenish gloss, from the distal area, which is dusted with pinkish violet.

== Biology ==
Larvae feed on species of Viola. The species produces one generation annually and flies in July–August.

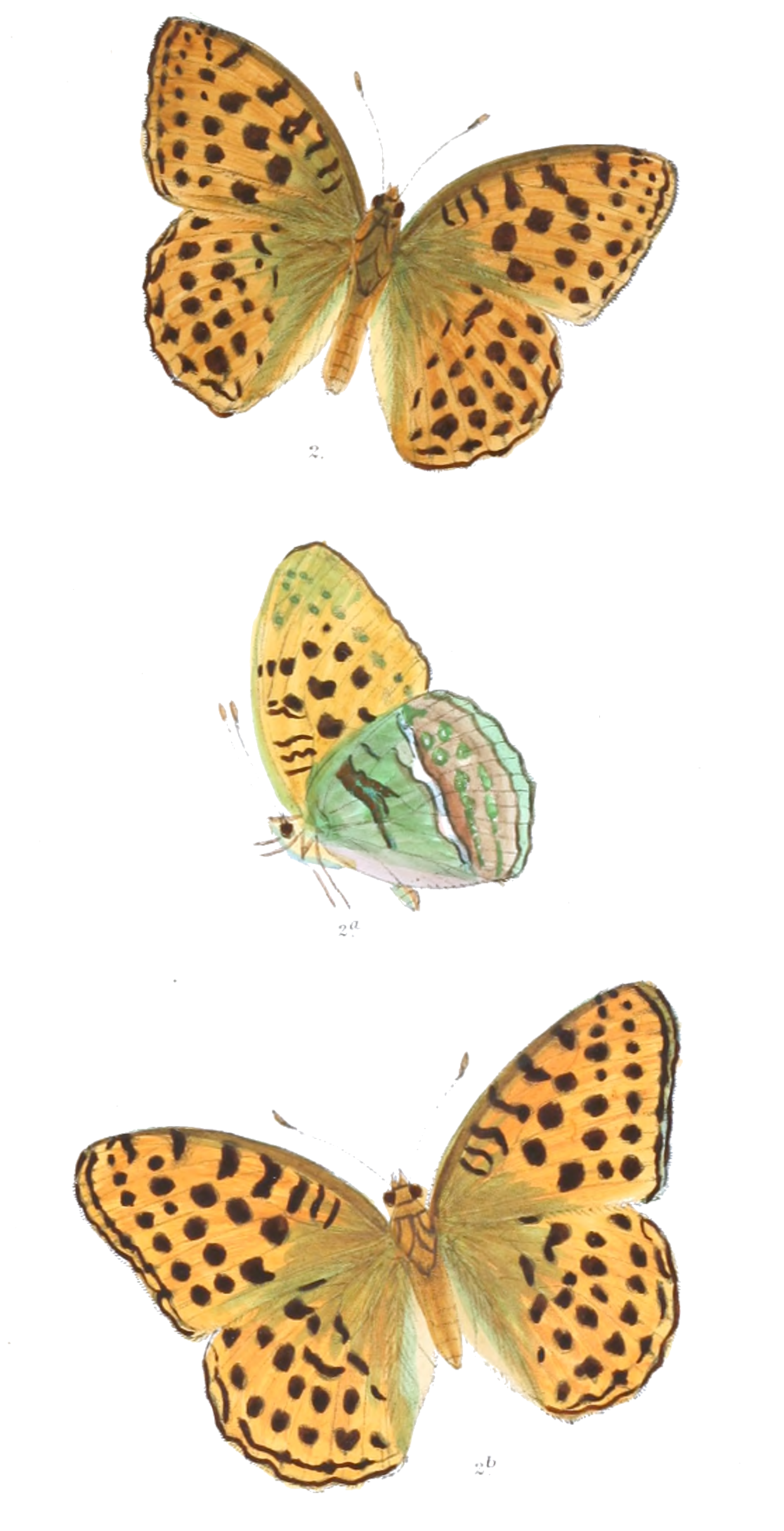
A. l. rudra
