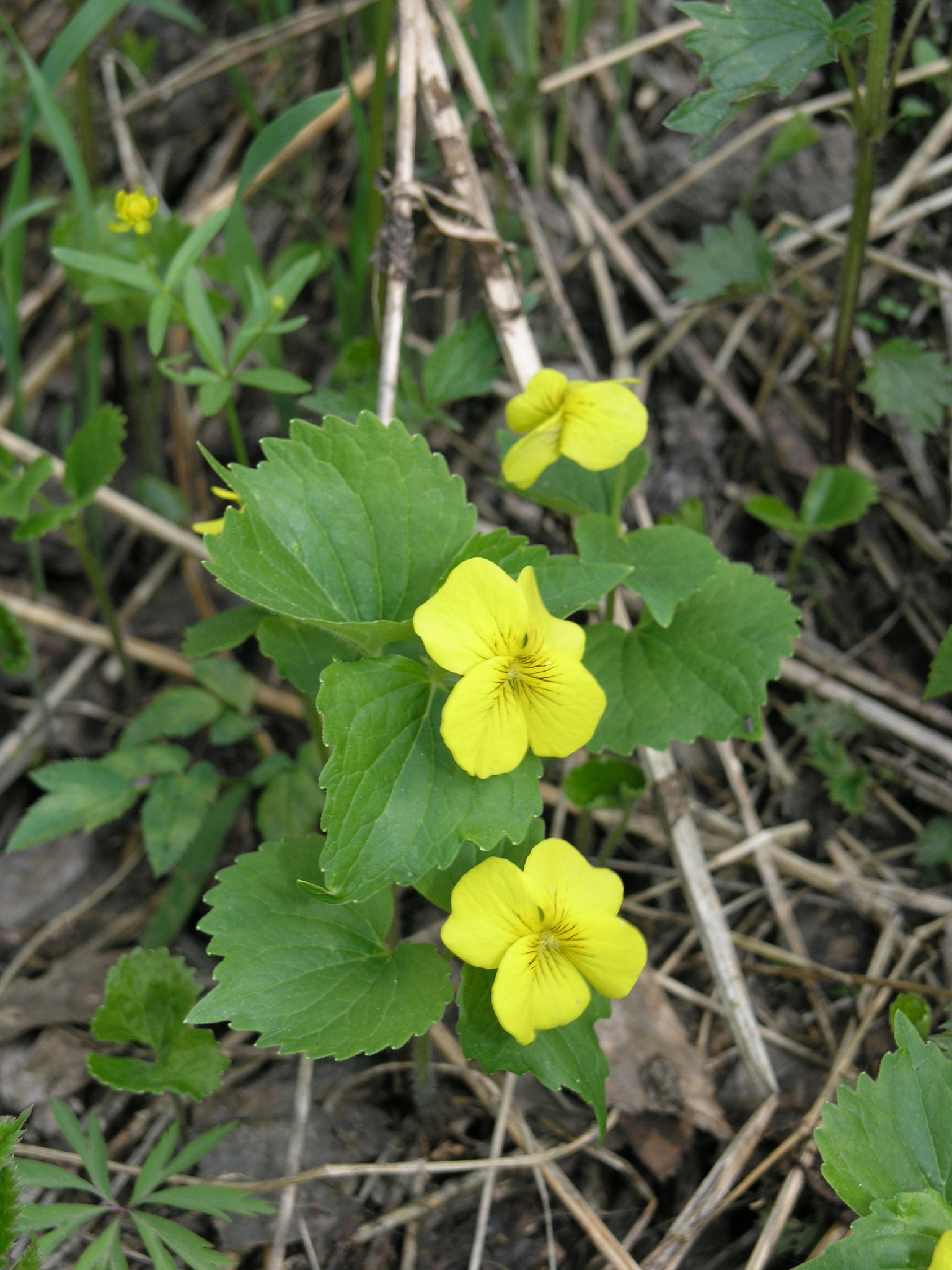
- In the Izdrevaya river valley

Scientific classification
- Kingdom: Plantae
- Clade: Tracheophytes
- Clade: Angiosperms
- Clade: Eudicots
- Clade: Rosids
- Order: Malpighiales
- Family: Violaceae
- Genus: Viola
- Species: V. uniflora

Binomial name
- Viola uniflora L.

Synonyms
- Viola uniflora subsp. lasczinskyi Zuev

= Viola uniflora =

Species of plant

Viola uniflora is a species of flowering plant in the violet family Violaceae, native to Siberia, Primorsky Krai in the Russian Far East, Kazakhstan, and Mongolia. A perennial, it is typically found in wetter areas in forest-steppes.
