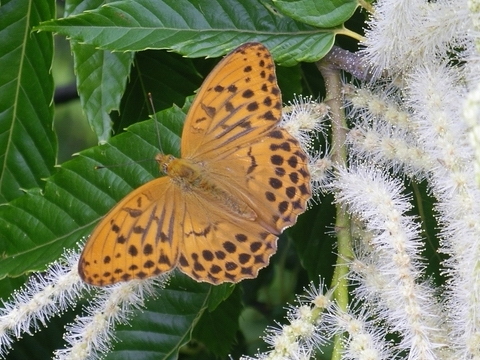
- Male, in Nagasaki
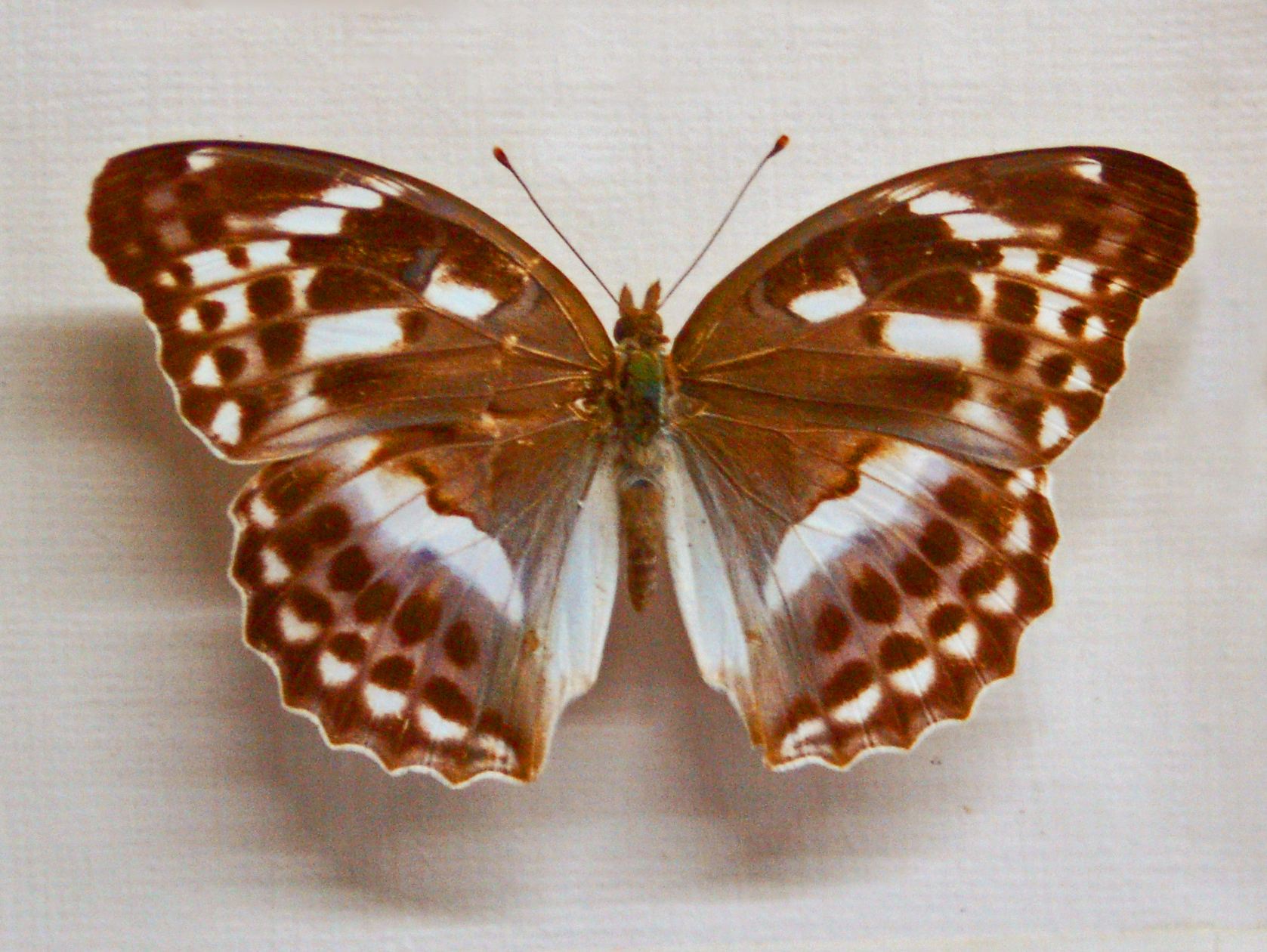
- Upperside of a female, at National Museum (Prague)

Scientific classification
- Domain: Eukaryota
- Kingdom: Animalia
- Phylum: Arthropoda
- Class: Insecta
- Order: Lepidoptera
- Family: Nymphalidae
- Genus: Argynnis
- Species: A. sagana

Binomial name
- Argynnis sagana Doubleday, 1847

Synonyms
- Damora sagana (Doubleday, 1847)

= Argynnis sagana =

Species of butterfly

Argynnis sagana is a species of butterfly in the family Nymphalidae.

== Description ==
Argynnis sagana has a wingspan of about 50–60 millimetres (2.0–2.4 in). This species displays little geographical variations, but it is well known for the significant differences (sexual dimorphism) between males (orange-brown wings with black markings) and females (dark brown or black wings with white bands), so individuals of different sexes can be mistakenly attributed to different species.

The caterpillars are dark brown, with long yellowish appendages similar to thorns.

== Biology ==
This butterfly has a single brood and flies from July to September depending on the location. They feed on Viola species (Viola grypoceras, Viola verecunda, Viola eizanensis, Viola uniflora).

== Distribution and habitat ==
This species is present in broadleaves or mixed light forests of China, Mongolia, South Eastern Siberia, Korea and Japan.

== Taxonomy ==
This species used to be included in a monotypic genus called Damora Nordmann, 1851, which is now regarded as a junior synonym of Argynnis.

== Subspecies ==
- Argynnis sagana sagana Doubleday, 1847
- Argynnis sagana liane Fruhstorfer, 1907 (Nagasaki)
- Argynnis sagana relicta Korshunov, 1984 (Kemerovo Region, Southern Siberia)
- Argynnis sagana paulina Nordman, 1851 (Irkutsk, Siberia)
- Argynnis sagana nordmanni Korshunov, 1984 (Amur region, Blagoveshchensk Region).
- Argynnis sagana ilona Fruhstorfer, 1907 (Tsushima Island)
