= List of butterflies of Russia =

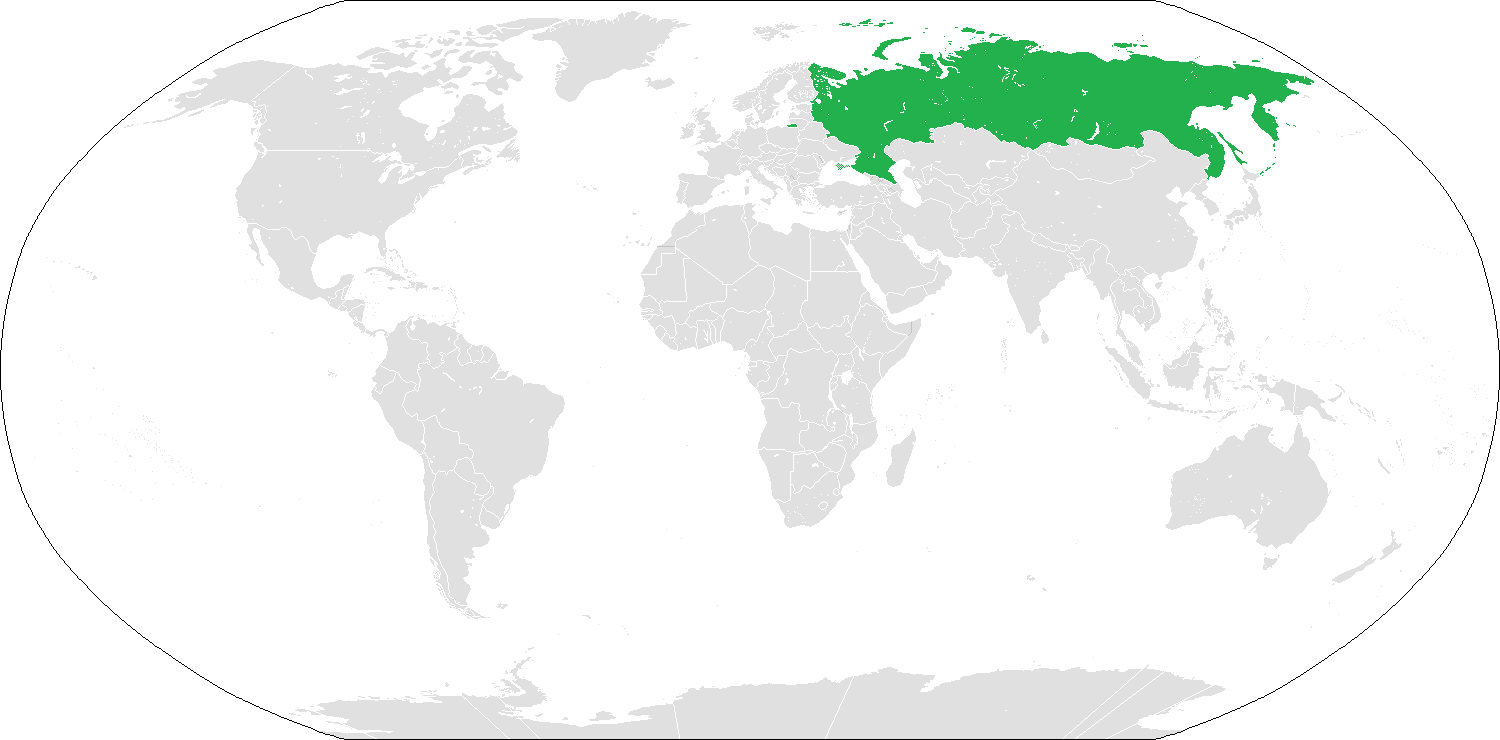
Location of Russia

This is a list of butterflies of Russia. About 540 species are known from Russia. The butterflies (mostly diurnal) and moths (mostly nocturnal) together make up the taxonomic order Lepidoptera.

The history of lepidopterology in Russia is connected with the organization of the first Russian museum The Kunstkamera established by Peter the Great in 1714. In 1717, he purchased the collection of Albert Seba, a merchant from Amsterdam, for the new museum. In 1832 the Zoological Museum of the Imperial Academy of Sciences was separated as a distinct institution which in 1931 became the Zoological Institute of the USSR Academy of Sciences (since 1991 — Russian Academy of Sciences).

In 1859, the then director of the Zoological Museum, Johann Friedrich von Brandt was one of the founders of the Russian Entomological Society in 1859 and in St. Petersburg. Other founders were Karl Ernst von Baer, Ya. A. Kushakevich, Colonel Alexander Karlovich Manderstern, Alexander von Middendorff and Colonel of General Staff Victor Ivanovitsch Motschulsky. Another society founder was Ferdinand Morawitz. Eduard Brandt and Ferdinand Morawitz. Also important was the Moscow Society of Naturalists and increasingly the Russian Academy of Sciences and The Academy of Sciences of the USSR. From the mid-nineteenth century the main zoogeographic focus was on the Caucasus, Siberia and the Russian Far East. At the end of the nineteenth century the German entomologist Otto Staudinger financed collectors in the Far East of Russia. In the early twentieth century the results of all these endeavours were summarised in Die Gross-Schmetterlinge der Erde edited by Adalbert Seitz.

From 1925 lepidopterology was organised by The Academy of Sciences of the USSR and lists titled USSR or SSR. In 1991 The Academy of Sciences of the USSR became once again the Russian Academy of Sciences.

Notable Russian lepidopterists include Peter Simon Pallas, Johann Friedrich von Eschscholtz, Édouard Ménétries, Johann von Böber, Hugo Theodor Christoph, Alexander Yakhontov, Alexander von Nordmann, Vasily Evgrafovich Yakovlev, Victor Motschulsky, Sergei Alphéraky, Otto Vasilievich Bremer, Grigory Grum-Grshimailo, Alexei Pavlovich Fedchenko, Nicholas Mikhailovich, Nikolay Grigoryevich Erschoff, Nikolai Yakovlevich Kuznetsov, Grigory Bey-Bienko and Yuri Korshunov.

Butterflies of Russia

== Hesperiidae ==
genus: Aeromachus

- Aeromachus inachus (Menetries, 1859)

genus: Bibasis

- Bibasis aquilina (Speyer, 1879)

genus: Carcharodus

- Carcharodus alceae (Esper, [1780])
- Carcharodus flocciferus (Zeller, 1847)
- Carcharodus lavatherae (Esper, [1783])
- Carcharodus orientalis Reverdin, 1913

genus: Carterocephalus

- Carterocephalus argyrostigma (Eversmann, 1851) South Siberia
- Carterocephalus dieckmanni Graeser, 1888 Amur Oblast
- Carterocephalus palaemon (Pallas, 1771)
- Carterocephalus silvicola (Meigen, 1829)

genus: Daimio

- Daimio tethys (Menetries, 1857)

genus: Erynnis

- Erynnis montanus (Bremer, 1861) Amur Oblast
- Erynnis popoviana (Nordmann, 1851) Zabaykalsky, Amur Oblast
- Erynnis tages (Linnaeus, 1758)

genus: Hesperia

- Hesperia comma (Linnaeus, 1758)
- Hesperia florinda (Butler, 1878) Pribaikalye (Siberia), Zabaykalsky

genus: Heteropterus

- Heteropterus morpheus (Pallas, 1771)

genus: Leptalina

- Leptalina unicolor (Bremer & Grey, 1853)

genus: Lobocla

- Lobocla bifasciatus (Bremer & Grey, 1853) Amur Oblast, Ussuri

genus: Muschampia

- Muschampia cribrellum (Eversmann, 1841)
- Muschampia gigas (Bremer, 1864) Amur Oblast
- Muschampia protheon (Rambur, 1858) Transbaikal
- Muschampia proto (Ochsenheimer, 1808)
- Muschampia tessellum (Hübner, [1803])

genus: Ochlodes

- Ochlodes ochracea (Bremer, 1861) Amur Oblast
- Ochlodes subhyalina (Bremer & Grey, 1853) Amur Oblast
- Ochlodes sylvanus (Esper, 1777)
- Ochlodes venatus (Bremer & Grey, 1853) Amur Oblast, Sakhalin

genus: Parnara

- Parnara guttatus (Bremer & Grey, 1853)

genus: Polytremis

- Polytremis pellucida (Murray, 1875)
- Polytremis zina (Evans, 1932) Amur Oblast, Sakhalin

genus: Potanthus

- Potanthus flava (Murray, 1875)

genus: Pyrgus

- Pyrgus alveus (Нubnеr, [1803])
- Pyrgus andromedae (Wallengren, 1853)
- Pyrgus armoricanus Oberthur, 1910)
- Pyrgus carthami Hübner, [1813])
- Pyrgus centaureae (Rambur, [1839])
- Pyrgus cinarae (Rambur, [1839])
- Pyrgus jupei (Alberti, 1967)
- Pyrgus maculatus (Bremer & Grey, 1853) Mountains of South Siberia, Sayan Mountains, Zabaykalsky, Priamurye, Primorye
- Pyrgus malvae (Linnaeus, 1758)
- Pyrgus melotis (Duponchel, [1834])
- Pyrgus serratulae (Rambur, [1839])
- Pyrgus sibirica (Reverdin, 1911) Altai Mountains, Sayan Mountains
- Pyrgus sidae (Esper,[1784])
- Pyrgus speyeri (Staudinger, 1887) Sayan Mountains, Pribaikalye, Zabaykalsky, Priamurye, Primorye

genus: Satarupa

- Satarupa nymphalis (Speyer, 1879) Primorsky (Amur)

genus: Spialia

- Spialia orbifer Hübner, [1823])

genus: Thoressa

- Thoressa varia (Murray, 1875)

genus: Thymelicus

- Thymelicus acteon (Rottemburg, 1775)
- Thymelicus hyrax (Lederer, 1861) European Russia South
- Thymelicus leonina (Butler, 1878)
- Thymelicus lineola (Ochsenheimer, 1808)
- Thymelicus sylvatica (Bremer, 1861) Amur, Ussuri
- Thymelicus sylvestris (Poda, 1761)

== Lycaenidae ==
genus: Agriades

- Agriades glandon (Prunner, 1798)
- Agriades optilete (Knoch, 1781)
- Agriades pheretiades (Eversmann, 1843)
- Agriades pyrenaicus (Boisduval, 1840)

genus: Ahlbergia

- Ahlbergia aleucopuncta Johnson, 1992
- Ahlbergia ferrea (Butler, 1866) Zabaykalsky Krai
- Ahlbergia frivaldszkyi (Lederer, 1853) Transbaikalia, Russian Far East, Kamchatka, Amur Oblast, Ussuri
- Ahlbergia korea Johnson, 1992 Amur Oblast, Ussuri

genus: Antigius

- Antigius attilia (Bremer, 1861)
- Antigius butleri (Fenton, [1882]) Amur Oblast, Primorye, Ussuri

genus: Araragi

- Araragi enthea (Janson, 1877) Amur Oblast, Ussuri

genus: Aricia

- Aricia agestis ([Denis & Schiffermüller], 1775)
- Aricia anteros (Freyer, 1838) South European Russia
- Aricia artaxerxes (Fabricius, 1793)
- Aricia chinensis (Murray, 1874) Amur Oblast, Ussuri, South Siberia, Turkestan, Altai Mountains, Greater Caucasus
- Aricia nicias (Meigen, 1830)
- Aricia teberdina (Sheljuzhko, 1934) Greater Caucasus

genus: Artopoetes

- Artopoetes pryeri (Murray, 1873) South Amur, Ussuri

genus: Atara

- Atara arata (Bremer, 1861) Amur Oblast, Sakhalin
- Atara саеrulеа (Bremer & Grey, 1853) Amur Oblast

genus: Athamanthia

- Athamanthia japhetica (Nekrutenko & Effendi, 1983) Caucasus Minor

genus: Callophrys

- Callophrys butlerovi Migranov, 1991 South Urals
- Callophrys chalybeitincta Sovinsky, 1905 Caucasus Minor
- Callophrys rubi (Linnaeus, 1758)

genus: Celastrina

- Celastrina argiolus (Linnaeus, 1758)
- Celastrina fedoseevi Korshunov & Ivonin, 1990 Transbaikalia, Amur Oblast
- Celastrina filipjevi (Riley, 1934) Ussuri
- Celastrina ladonides (de l'Orza, 1867)
- Celastrina oreas (Leech, 1893) Amur Oblast, Ussuri
- Celastrina phellodendroni Omelko, 1987 Ussuri
- Celastrina sugitanii (Matsumura, 1919) Sakhalin

genus: Coreana

- Coreana raphaelis (Oberthur, 1880)

genus: Cupido

- Cupido alcetas (Hoffmannsegg, 1804)
- Cupido argiades (Pallas, 1771)
- Cupido decolorata (Staudinger, 1886) South European Russia
- Cupido minimus (Fuessly, 1775)
- Cupido osiris (Meigen, 1829)

genus: Cyaniris

- Cyaniris bellis (Freyer, [1842]) Caucasus Minor
- Cyaniris semiargus (Rottemburg, 1775)

genus: Eumedonia

- Eumedonia eumedon (Esper, [1780])

genus: Favonius

- Favonius aquamarinus (Dubatolov & Sergeev, 1987) Ussuri
- Favonius cognatus (Staudinger, 1892) Sakhalin
- Favonius jezoensis (Matsumura, 1915) Sakhalin, Kuril Island
- Favonius korshunovi (Dubatolov & Sergeev, 1982) Sayan Mountains
- Favonius orientalis (Murray, 1875) Amur Oblast, Ussuri
- Favonius saphirinus (Staudinger, 1887)
- Favonius taxila (Bremer, 1861)
- Favonius ultramarinus (Fixsen, 1887) Ussuri

genus: Glabroculus

- Glabroculus cyane (Eversmann, 1837) South Siberia, Sayan Mountains, Altai Range

genus: Glaucopsyche

- Glaucopsyche alexis (Poda, 1761)
- Glaucopsyche argali (Elwes, 1899) Altai Range
- Glaucopsyche lycormas (Butler, 1866) Amur Oblast, Sakhalin
- Glaucopsyche lygdamus (Doubleday, 1841)

genus: Goldia

- Goldia pacifica (Dubatolov & Korshunov, 1984)

genus: Japonica

- Japonica adusta (Riley, 1930) Primorsky Krai
- Japonica lutea (Hewitson, [1865]) Amur Oblast, Ussuri, Sakhalin
- Japonica saepestriata (Hewitson, [1865])

genus: Kretania

- Kretania eurypilus (Freyer, 1851) Caucasus Minor
- Kretania pylaon (Fischer von Waldheim, 1832)
- Kretania sephirus (Frivaldszky, 1835) South European Russia
- Kretania zephyrinus (Christoph, 1884) Caucasus Major, Caucasus Minor

genus: Lampides

- Lampides boeticus (Linnaeus, 1767)

genus: Leptotes

- Leptotes pirithous (Linnaeus, 1767)

genus: Lycaena

- Lycaena alciphron (Rottemburg, 1775)
- Lycaena candens (Herrich-Schäffer, [1844]) Caucasus Minor
- Lycaena dispar (Haworth, 1802)
- Lycaena helle ([Denis & Schiffermüller], 1775)
- Lycaena hippothoe (Linnaeus, 1761)
- Lycaena phlaeas (Linnaeus, 1761)
- Lycaena thersamon (Esper, [1784])
- Lycaena tityrus (Poda, 1761)
- Lycaena violacea (Staudinger, 1892) Altai Mountains, Sayan Mountains, Transbaikalia
- Lycaena virgaureae (Linnaeus, 1758)

genus: Lysandra

- Lysandra arzanovi (Stradomsky & Shchurov, 2005)
- Lysandra bellargus (Rottemburg, 1775)
- Lysandra coridon (Poda, 1761)
- Lysandra corydonius (Herrich-Schäffer, [1852]) Caucasus Major, Caucasus Minor
- Lysandra melamarina Dantchenko, 2000

genus: Neolycaena

- Neolycaena davidi (Oberthur, 1881) South Siberia, Altai Range
- Neolycaena falkovitchi Zhdanko & Korshunov, 1985 North Altai Range, West Sayan Mountains
- Neolycaena irkuta Zhdanko,[1996] East Altai Range, East Sayan Mountains, West Transbaikalia
- Neolycaena rhymnus (Eversmann, 1832)

genus: Neolysandra

- Neolysandra coelestina (Eversmann, 1843) South European Russia

genus: Neozephyrus

- Neozephyrus brillantinus (Staudinger, 1887) Ussuri
- Neozephyrus japonicus (Murray, 1875) Amur Oblast, Ussuri
- Neozephyrus smaragdinus (Bremer, 1861) Ussuri, Sakhalin

genus: Niphanda

- Niphanda fusca (Bremer & Grey, 1852) Ussuri

genus: Patricius

- Patricius lucifer (Staudinger, 1867) South Siberia (mountains)

genus: Phengaris

- Phengaris alcon ([Denis & Schiffermüller], 1775)
- Phengaris arion (Linnaeus, 1758)
- Phengaris arionides (Staudinger, 1887)
- Phengaris cyanecula (Eversmann, 1848) South Siberia, Sayan Mountains, Altai Range
- Phengaris kurentzovi (Sibatani, Saigusa & Hirowatari, 1994) Amur Oblast, Ussuri
- Phengaris nausithous (Bergstrasser, 1779)
- Phengaris ogumae (Matsumura, 1910) Sakhalin
- Phengaris teleius (Bergstrasser, 1779)

genus: Plebejidea

- Plebejidea loewii (Zeller, 1847) Caucasus Minor

genus: Plebejus

- Plebejus argus (Linnaeus, 1758)
- Plebejus argyrognomon (Bergstrasser, [1779])
- Plebejus idas (Linnaeus, 1761)
- Plebejus maracandicus (Erschoff, 1874) Southwest Russia, South Urals, Transbaikalia, Yakutia Magadan
- Plebejus polaris (Nordström, 1928) Kamchatka
- Plebejus pseudaegon (Butler, 1881) Sakhalin
- Plebejus sailjugemicus Zhdanko & Samodurov, 1999 Russian Far East, Kamchatka, Altai Range
- Plebejus saldaitisi Churkin & Zhdanko, 2003 Mongolia
- Plebejus subsolanus Eversmann, 1851 Amur Oblast, Ussuri, Altai Range, Sayan Mountains

genus: Polyommatus

- Polyommatus altivagans (Forster, 1956)
- Polyommatus amandus (Schneider, 1792)
- Polyommatus aserbeidschanus (Forster, 1956)
- Polyommatus australorossicus Lukhtanov & Dantchenko, 2017
- Polyommatus boisduvalii (Herrich-Schäffer, [1843]) Caucasus
- Polyommatus damocles (Herrich-Schäffer, [1844]) South Urals
- Polyommatus damon ([Denis & Schiffermüller], 1775)
- Polyommatus damone (Eversmann, 1841) South European Russia, Siberia, Altai range, Caucasus
- Polyommatus daphnis ([Denis & Schiffermüller], 1775)
- Polyommatus dorylas ([Denis & Schiffermüller], 1775)
- Polyommatus elena Stradomsky & Arzanov, 1999
- Polyommatus eros (Ochsenheimer, [1808])
- Polyommatus erotides (Staudinger, 1892) Russian Far East, Siberia, Transbaikalia, Altai Range, Sayan Mountains
- Polyommatus icadius (Grum-Grshimailo, 1890) Alai Range, Pamirs
- Polyommatus icarus (Rottemburg, 1775)
- Polyommatus kamtshadalis (Sheljuzhko, 1933)
- Polyommatus meoticus Zhdanko & Stshurov, 1998 Caucasus
- Polyommatus pacificus Stradomsky & Tuzov, 2006
- Polyommatus phyllis (Christoph, 1877) Caucasus
- Polyommatus ripartii (Freyer, 1830)
- Polyommatus shamil (Dantchenko, 2000) Northeast Caucasus
- Polyommatus shchurovi Stradomsky, 2006 Caucasus
- Polyommatus thersites (Cantener, 1835)
- Polyommatus tsvetajevi (Kurentzov, 1970) Usurri
- Polyommatus yurinekrutenko Kocak, 1996 Caucasus

genus: Praephilotes

- Praephilotes anthracias (Christoph, 1877) Turkestan

genus: Protantigius

- Protantigius superans (Oberthur, 1914)

genus: Pseudophilotes

- Pseudophilotes baton (Bergstrasser, [1779])
- Pseudophilotes bavius (Eversmann, 1832)
- Pseudophilotes jacuticus Korshunov & Viidalерр, 1980
- Pseudophilotes vicrama (Moore, 1865)

genus: Quercusia

- Quercusia quercus (Linnaeus, 1758)

genus: Satyrium

- Satyrium acaciae (Fabricius, 1787) South European Russia, Caucasus Major
- Satyrium eximius (Fixsen, 1887) Ussuri
- Satyrium herzi (Fixsen, 1887) Amur Oblast, Ussuri
- Satyrium ilicis (Esper, [1779]) Central European Russia, South European Russia, Caucasus Major, Caucasus Minor
- Satyrium latior (Fixsen, 1887) Amur Oblast, Ussuri
- Satyrium pruni (Linnaeus, 1758)
- Satyrium prunoides (Staudinger, 1887) South Siberia, Amur Oblast, Ussuri, Altai Range
- Satyrium spini (Fabricius, 1787) Central European Russia, South European Russia, Caucasus Major
- Satyrium w-album (Knoch, 1782)

genus: Scolitantides

- Scolitantides orion (Pallas, 1771)

genus: Shijimiaeoides

- Shijimiaeoides divina (Fixsen, 1887) Amur Oblast, Ussuri

genus: Shirozua

- Shirozua jonasi (Janson, 1877)

genus: Tarucus

- Tarucus balkanicus (Freyer, [1844]) Caucasus Minor

genus: Thecla

- Thecla betulae (Linnaeus, 1758)
- Thecla betulina Staudinger, 1887

genus: Tomares

- Tomares callimachus (Eversmann, 1848) South European Russia, Caucasus Major, Caucasus Minor
- Tomares nogelii (Herrich-Schäffer, [1851]) South European Russia

genus: Tongeia

- Tongeia fischeri (Eversmann, 1843)

genus: Turanana

- Turanana endymion (Freyer, [1850])

genus: Ussuriana

- Ussuriana michaelis (Oberthur, 1880)
- Ussuriana stygiana (Butler, 1881) Sakhalin

genus: Wagimo

- Wagimo signata (Butler, 1881)

== Nymphalidae ==
genus: Aglais

- Aglais urticae (Linnaeus, 1758)
- Aglais io (Linnaeus, 1758)

genus: Aldania

- Aldania raddei (Bremer, 1861) Amur Oblast, Primorsky Krai

genus: Amuriana

- Amuriana schrenckii (Menetries, 1859) Amur basin

genus: Apatura

- Apatura ilia ([Denis & Schiffermüller], 1775)
- Apatura iris (Linnaeus, 1758)
- Apatura metis Freyer, 1829

genus: Aphantopus

- Aphantopus hyperantus (Linnaeus, 1758)

genus: Araschnia

- Araschnia burejana Bremer, 1861
- Araschnia levana (Linnaeus, 1758)

genus: Arethusana

- Arethusana arethusa ([Denis &. Schiffermüller], 1775)

genus: Argynnis

- Argynnis anadyomene C. & R. Felder, 1862 Amur Oblast, Ussuri
- Argynnis hyperbius (Linnaeus, 1763)
- Argynnis laodice (Pallas, 1771)
- Argynnis pandora ([Denis & Schiffermüller], 1775)
- Argynnis paphia (Linnaeus, 1758)
- Argynnis ruslana Motschulsky, 1866
- Argynnis sagana Doubleday, [1847]
- Argynnis zenobia Leech, 1890 Primorsky Krai

genus: Athymodes

- Athymodes nycteis (Menetries, 1859) Amur Oblast, Primorsky Krai

genus: Boeberia

- Boeberia parmenio (Bober, 1809) Altai Mountains South Siberia, Yakutia, Amur Oblast

genus: Boloria

- Boloria alaskensis (Holland, 1900) polar regions of Russian Eurasia, mountains of North Ural, Central and East Siberia, Kamchatka, the mountains of Bureya (Amur Oblast)
- Boloria altaica (Grum-Grshimailo, 1893) Tarbagatai Mountains to South Transbaikalia, East Yakutia
- Boloria aquilonaris (Stichel, 1908)
- Boloria banghaasi (Seitz, 1908) synonym of Euphydryas aurinia altivolans Tuzov, 2000
- Boloria caucasica (Lederer, 1852) Caucasus and Transcaucasia
- Boloria frigidalis Warren, 1944 Altai Mountains
- Boloria napaea (Hoffmannsegg, 1804)
- Boloria purpurea Churkin, 1999 Barguzin Mountains
- Boloria roddi Kosterin, 2000 Altai Mountains

genus: Brenthis

- Brenthis daphne (Bergstrasser, 1780)
- Brenthis hecate ([Denis & Schiffermüller], 1775)
- Brenthis ino (Rottemburg, 1775)

genus: Brintesia

- Brintesia circe (Fabricius, 1775)

genus: Chalinga

- Chalinga pratti (Leech, 1890) Ussuri

genus: Chazara

- Chazara briseis (Linnaeus, 1764)
- Chazara persephone (Hübner, [1805])

genus: Clossiana

- Clossiana angarensis (Erschoff, 1870) Arkhangelsk Region, Magadan regions and Chukotka Sakhalin West Siberia, Novosibirsk
- Clossiana butleri (Edwards, 1883) Chukotka and Kamchatka
- Clossiana chariclea (Schneider, 1794) Polar regions of Russian Eurasia, Kamchatka
- Clossiana dia (Linnaeus, 1767)
- Clossiana distincta (Gibson, 1920) Polar Urals, Transbaikalia, Yakutia, Chukotka
- Clossiana erda (Christoph, 1893) East Siberia, Zabaikalye (the Udokan and Yablonovyy mountain ranges), Amur Oblast
- Clossiana eunomia (Esper, [1799])
- Clossiana euphrosyne (Linnaeus, 1758)
- Clossiana freija (Thunberg, 1791)
- Clossiana frigga (Thunberg, 1791)
- Clossiana improba (Butler, 1877) tundras and forest-tundras of Eurasia
- Clossiana iphigenia (Graeser, 1888) Amur Oblast, Sakhalin, South Kuriles
- Clossiana matveevi Р.Gorbunov & Korshunov, 1995 Altai Mountains
- Clossiana oscarus (Eversmann, 1844) Altai Mountains, Siberia, Yakutia, Amur Oblast, Primorsky Krai
- Clossiana perryi (Butler, 1882) Amur Oblast, Primorsky Krai
- Clossiana polaris (Boisduval, 1828) East Siberia, Amur Oblast
- Clossiana selene ([Denis & Schiffermüller], 1775)
- Clossiana selenis (Eversmann, 1837)
- Clossiana thore (Hübner, [1803])
- Clossiana titania (Esper, [1793])
- Clossiana tritonia (Bober, 1812) Amur Oblast, Primorsky Krai

genus: Coenonympha

- Coenonympha amaryllis (Stoll, 1782) South Urals, Altai Mountains, Siberia, Transbaikalia, Amur, Ussuri
- Coenonympha arcania (Linnaeus, 1761)
- Coenonympha glycerion (Borkhausen, 1788)
- Coenonympha hero (Linnaeus, 1761)
- Coenonympha leander (Esper, [1784]) South Russia
- Coenonympha oedippus (Fabricius, 1787)
- Coenonympha pamphilus (Linnaeus, 1758)
- Coenonympha symphita Lederer, 1870 Transcaucasia
- Coenonympha tullia (Muller, 1764)

genus: Dilipa

- Dilipa fenestra (Leech, 1891) Primorsky Krai

genus: Erebia

- Erebia aethiops (Esper, [1777])
- Erebia afra (Fabricius, 1787) South Russia, South Urals, Caucasus
- Erebia ajanensis Menetries, 1857 Amur Oblast, Ussuri
- Erebia anyuica Kurentzov, 1966 Sibera, Sayan Mountains, Yakutia
- Erebia callias Edwards, 1871
- Erebia cyclopius (Eversmann, 1844)
- Erebia dabanensis Erschoff, 1872 Polar Urals, Sayan Mountains, Yakutia, Chukot Peninsula, Transbaikalia
- Erebia disa (Thunberg, 1791)
- Erebia discoidalis (Kirby, 1837) Arctic coasts of Eurasia, Polar Urals, North Siberia (tundra), Chukot Peninsula, Russian Far East, Transbaikalia, Amur
- Erebia edda Menetries, 1851 Urals, Altai Mountains, South Siberia, Yakutia, Ussuri, Chukot Peninsula
- Erebia embla (Thunberg, 1791)
- Erebia erinnyn Warren, 1932 Sayan Mountains, Transbaikalia
- Erebia euryale (Esper, [1805])
- Erebia fasciata Butler, 1868 Arctic coasts of Eurasia, Siberia, Chukot Peninsula, Russian Far East
- Erebia fletcheri Elwes, 1899 Altai Mountains, Yakutia, Sayan Mountains, Transbaikalia, Amur
- Erebia graucasica Jachontov, 1909 Caucasus Major
- Erebia iranica Grum-Grshimailo, 1895 Caucasus
- Erebia jeniseiensis Trybom, 1877 Altai Mountains, Siberia, Sakhalin, Magadan
- Erebia kefersteinii (Eversmann, 1851) Altai Mountains, Sayan Mountains
- Erebia kindermanni Staudinger, 1881 Altai Mountains
- Erebia kozhantshikovi Sheljuzhko, 1925 Transbaikalia, Chukot Peninsula
- Erebia ligea (Linnaeus, 1758)
- Erebia maurisius (Esper, [1803]) Altai Mountains, Sayan Mountains
- Erebia medusa ([Denis & Schiffermüller], 1775)
- Erebia melancholica Herrich-Schäffer, [1846] Caucasus, Transcaucasia
- Erebia neriene (ВоЬег, 1809) Altai Mountains, Transbaikalia Siberia, Sayan Mountains, Amur, Ussuri
- Erebia niphonica Janson, 1877 Sakhalin, Kuriles
- Erebia occulta Roos &. Kimmich, 1983 Chukot Peninsula
- Erebia pandrose (Borkhausen, 1788)
- Erebia pawlowskii Menetries, 1859 Sayan Mountains, Yakutia, Kamchatka
- Erebia polaris Staudinger, 1871
- Erebia rossii (Curtis, 1834) Arctic Eurasia, Altai Mountains, Transbaikalia
- Erebia sachaensis Dubatolov, 1992 Russian Far East, Yakutia, Chukot Peninsula
- Erebia stubbendorfii Menetries, 1846 Altai Mountains, Sayan Mountains
- Erebia theano (Tauscher, 1806) Siberia, Altai Mountains, Kuznetsk Alatau
- Erebia wanga Bremer, 1864 Amur
- Erebia youngi Holland, 1900 Chukot Peninsula

genus: Esperarge

- Esperarge climene (Esper, [1783]) South Russia, Caucasus, Transcausia

genus: Euphydryas

- Euphydryas aurinia (Rottemburg, 1775)
- Euphydryas davidi (Oberthur, 1881) Amur Oblast, Ussuri
- Euphydryas ichnea (Boisduval, [1833]) South Siberia, Transbaikalia, Russian Far East, Amur Oblast, Ussuri
- Euphydryas iduna (Dalman, 1816) Arctic Russia, Caucasus Major, Russian Far East, Altai Mountains, Sayan Mountains
- Euphydryas maturna (Linnaeus, 1758)
- Euphydryas merope (Prunner, 1798) Caucasus Major, South Siberia, Altai Mountains, Sayan Mountains
- Euphydryas orientalis (Herrich-Schäffer, [1851]) Transcaucasia, South Urals
- Euphydryas discordia Bolshakov & Korb, 2013 Caucasus

genus: Fabriciana

- Fabriciana adippe ([Denis & Schiffermüller], 1775)
- Fabriciana nerippe C. & R. Felder, 1862 Primorsky Krai
- Fabriciana niobe (Linnaeus, 1758)
- Fabriciana vorax Butler, 1871 Amur
- Fabriciana xipe (Grum-Grshimailo, 1891) Ussuri

genus: Harima

- Harima callipteris (Butler, 1877) Sakhalin, Kuriles

genus: Hipparchia

- Hipparchia alcyone ([Denis & Schiffermüller], 1775)
- Hipparchia autonoe (Esper, [1783]) South European Russia, North Caucasus, South Siberia, Amur Oblast
- Hipparchia fagi (Scopoli, 1763)
- Hipparchia pellucida (Stauder, 1924) Caucasus
- Hipparchia semele (Linnaeus, 1758)
- Hipparchia statilinus (Hufnagel, 1766)
- Hipparchia syriaca (Staudinger, 1871)

genus: Hyponephele

- Hyponephele cadusina (Staudinger, 1881) South Altai Mountains, North Alay Mountains
- Hyponephele huebneri Kocak, 1980 Kasakstan
- Hyponephele lupina (Costa, 1836) South European Russia, South Urals, Altai Mountains, South Siberia, Pamirs, Alay Mountains
- Hyponephele lycaon (Rottemburg, 1775)
- Hyponephele pasimelas (Staudinger, 1886) Baikal, Transbaikalia, Amur Oblast, Ussuri

genus: Issoria

- Issoria eugenia (Eversmann, 1847) Siberia, Transbaikalia, Sayan Mountains, Alay Mountains, Russian Far East, Kamchatka
- Issoria lathonia (Linnaeus, 1758)

genus: Kirinia

- Kirinia epaminondas (Staudinger, 1887) Amur Oblast, Ussuri
- Kirinia epimenides (Menetries, 1859) Amur Oblast, Ussuri

genus: Lasiommata

- Lasiommata maera (Linnaeus, 1758)
- Lasiommata megera (Linnaeus, 1767)
- Lasiommata petropolitana (Fabricius, 1787)

genus: Lethe

- Lethe diana (Butler, 1866)
- Lethe marginalis (Motschulsky, 1860) Amur Oblast, Ussuri

genus: Libythea

- Libythea celtis (Laicharting, [1782])

genus: Limenitis

- Limenitis amphyssa Menetries, 1859 Siberia
- Limenitis camilla (Linnaeus, 1764)
- Limenitis doerriesi Staudinger, 1892 Ussuri
- Limenitis helmanni Lederer, 1853 Altai Mountains, Amur Oblast, Ussuri
- Limenitis homeyeri Tancre, 1881 Amur Oblast
- Limenitis moltrechti Kardakoff, 1928 Amur Oblast, Ussuri
- Limenitis populi (Linnaeus, 1758)
- Limenitis reducta Staudinger, 1901
- Limenitis sidyi Lederer, 1853 Amur Oblast, Ussuri, Transbaikalia

genus: Lopinga

- Lopinga achine (Scopoli, 1763)
- Lopinga deidamia (Eversmann, 1851)

genus: Maniola

- Maniola jurtina (Linnaeus, 1758)

genus: Melanargia

- Melanargia epimede Staudinger, 1887 Amur
- Melanargia galathea (Linnaeus, 1758)
- Melanargia halimede (Menetries, 1859) Transbaikalia
- Melanargia russiae (Esper, [1783])

genus: Melitaea

- Melitaea ambigua Menetries, 1859 South Siberia, Amur Oblast, Sakhalin
- Melitaea arcesia Bremer, 1861
- Melitaea arduinna (Esper, [1784])
- Melitaea athalia (Rottemburg, 1775)
- Melitaea aurelia Nickerl, 1850
- Melitaea britomartis Assmann, 1847
- Melitaea caucasogenita Verity, 1930 Caucasus
- Melitaea centralasiae Wnukowsky, 1929
- Melitaea cinxia (Linnaeus, 1758)
- Melitaea diamina (Lang, 1789)
- Melitaea didyma (Esper, [1778]) Mongolia
- Melitaea didymina Staudinger, 1886
- Melitaea didymoides Eversmann, 1847
- Melitaea interrupta Kolenati, 1846 Caucasus, Transcaucasus
- Melitaea latonigena Eversmann, 1847 Sayan Mountains, Altay Mountains, Yakutia
- Melitaea menetriesi Caradja, 1895 Kamchatka
- Melitaea persea Kollar, [1849]
- Melitaea phoebe ([Denis & Schiffermüller], 1775)
- Melitaea plotina Bremer, 1861 Altai Mountains, Sayan Mountains, Transbaikalia, Amur, Ussuri, Novosibirsk
- Melitaea protomedia Menetries, 1858
- Melitaea pseudosibina Alberti, 1969 Caucasus, Transcaucasia
- Melitaea rebeli Wnukowsky, 1929 Altai Mountains
- Melitaea romanovi Grum-Grshimailo, 1891 Transbaikalia
- Melitaea scotosia Butler, 1878 Ussuri
- Melitaea sutschana Staudinger, 1892 Transbaikalia, Amur, Ussuri, Sakhalin
- Melitaea trivia ([Denis & Schiffermüller], 1775)
- Melitaea westsibirica Dubatolov, 1998 Altai Mountains

genus: Neope

- Neope goschkevitschii (Menetries, 1857)
- Neope niphonica Butler, 1881

genus: Neptis

- Neptis alwina (Bremer & Grey, 1852) South Amur Oblast, Ussuri
- Neptis andetria Fruhstorfer, 1912 Siberia
- Neptis deliquata Stichel, 1908 Transbaikalia, Amur Oblast, Ussuri
- Neptis ilos Fruhstorfer, 1909 Amur Oblast, Ussuri
- Neptis philyra Menetries, 1859 Siberia, Amur Oblast, Ussuri
- Neptis philyroides Staudinger, 1887 Amur Oblast, Ussuri
- Neptis rivularis (Scopoli, 1763)
- Neptis sappho (Pallas, 1771)
- Neptis speyeri Staudinger, 1887 Amur Oblast, Ussuri
- Neptis themis Leech, 1890 Ussuri
- Neptis thisbe Menetries, 1859

genus: Ninguta

- Ninguta schrenckii (Menetries, 1859) Amur Oblast

genus: Nymphalis

- Nymphalis antiopa (Linnaeus, 1758)
- Nymphalis canace (Linnaeus, 1763)
- Nymphalis connexa (Butler, 1881) Ussuri, Sakhalin, Kuriles
- Nymphalis polychloros (Linnaeus, 1758)
- Nymphalis vaualbum ([Denis & Schiffermüller], 1775)
- Nymphalis xanthomelas (Esper, [1781])

genus: Oeneis

- Oeneis actaeoides Lukhtanov, 1989 Yakutia, Tchukot Peninsula
- Oeneis aktashi Lukhtanov, 1984 Altai Mountains, Sayan Mountains
- Oeneis alpina Kurentzov, 1970
- Oeneis ammon Elwes, 1899 Altai Mountains, Sayan Mountains
- Oeneis ammosovi Dubatolov & Korshunov, 1988 Transbaikalia, Yakutia
- Oeneis bore (Schneider, 1792) Arctic Russian Europe, Arctic Siberia, Yakutia, Magadan Oblast, Sayan Mountains
- Oeneis diluta Lukhtanov, 1994 Siberia
- Oeneis elwesi Staudinger, 1901
- Oeneis jutta (Hübner, [1806])
- Oeneis lederi Alphéraky, 1897 Siberia, Irkutsk Oblast
- Oeneis magna Graeser, 1888
- Oeneis melissa (Fabricius, 1775)
- Oeneis nanna (Menetries, 1859) Siberia, Transbaikal, Amur Oblast, Yakutia
- Oeneis norna (Thunberg, 1791)
- Oeneis pansa Christoph, 1893 Yakutia, Magadan Oblast
- Oeneis polixenes (Fabricius, 1775) Polar Urals, Siberia, Tchukot Region
- Oeneis sculda (Eversmann, 1851) Transbaikal, Yakutia, Altai Mountains, Siberia
- Oeneis tarpeia (Pallas, 1771)
- Oeneis tunga Staudinger, 1894 Siberia
- Oeneis urda (Eversmann, 1847)

genus: Parantica

- Parantica sita (Коllаr, [1844])

genus: Pararge

- Pararge aegeria (Linnaeus, 1758)

genus: Polygonia

- Polygonia c-album (Linnaeus, 1758)
- Polygonia c-aureum (Linnaeus, 1758)
- Polygonia egea (Cramer, [1775])
- Polygonia interposita Staudinger, 1881

genus: Pseudochazara

- Pseudochazara alpina (Staudinger, 1878)
- Pseudochazara daghestana (Holik, 1955)
- Pseudochazara hippolyte (Esper, [1784])
- Pseudochazara nukatli Bogdanov, 2000 Caucasus
- Pseudochazara pallida (Staudinger, 1901)
- Pseudochazara pelopea (Klug, 1832)

genus: Satyrus

- Satyrus amasinus Staudinger, 1861 Transcaucasia
- Satyrus dryas (Scopoli, 1763)
- Satyrus ferula (Fabricius, 1793)

genus: Sephisa

- Sephisa princeps (Fixsen, 1887)

genus: Speyeria

- Speyeria aglaja (Linnaeus, 1758)

genus: Thaleropis

- Thaleropis ionia (Eversmann, 1851) Armenia, Azerbaijan

genus: Triphysa

- Triphysa nervosa Motschulsky, 1866
- Triphysa phryne (Pallas, 1771)

genus: Vanessa

- Vanessa atalanta (Linnaeus, 1758)
- Vanessa cardui (Linnaeus, 1758)
- Vanessa indica (Herbst, 1794)

genus: Ypthima

- Ypthima argus Butler, 1866
- Ypthima motschulskyi (Bremer & Grey, 1852) Amur Oblast
- Ypthima multistriata Butler, 1883 synonym

== Papilionidae ==
genus: Achillides

- Achillides bianor (Cramer, [1777])
- Achillides maackii (Menetries, 1859)

genus: Atrophaneura

- Atrophaneura alcinous (Klug, 1836)

genus: Iphiclides

- Iphiclides podalirius (Linnaeus, 1758)

genus: Luehdorfia

- Luehdorfia puziloi (Erschoff, 1872)

genus: Papilio

- Papilio machaon Linnaeus, 1758
- Papilio xuthus Linnaeus, 1767

genus: Parnassius

- Parnassius amgunensis Sheljuzhko, 1928
- Parnassius apollo (Linnaeus, 1758)
- Parnassius arcticus (Eisner, 1968)
- Parnassius ariadne (Lederer, 1853)\
- Parnassius bremeri С.Felder & R.Felder, 1864
- Parnassius eversmanni [Menetries, 1850]
- Parnassius felderi Bremer, 1861
- Parnassius hoenei Schweitzer, 1912
- Parnassius mnemosyne (Linnaeus, 1758)
- Parnassius nomion Fischer von Waldheim, 1823
- Parnassius nordmanni [Menetries, 1850]
- Parnassius phoebus (Fabricius, 1793)
- Parnassius stubbendorfii Menetries, 1849
- Parnassius tenedius Eversmann, 1851

genus: Sericinus

- Sericinus montela Gray, 1852

genus: Zerynthia

- Zerynthia caucasica (Lederer, 1864)
- Zerynthia polyxena ([Denis & Schiffermüller], 1775)

== Pieridae ==
genus: Anthocharis

- Anthocharis cardamines (Linnaeus, 1758)
- Anthocharis damone Boisduval, 1836
- Anthocharis gruneri Herrich-Schäffer, [1851]
- Anthocharis scolymus Butler, 1866

genus: Aporia

- Aporia crataegi (Linnaeus, 1758)
- Aporia hippia (Bremer, 1861)

genus: Colias

- Colias alfacariensis Ribbe, 1905
- Colias aurorina Herrich-Schäffer, [1850]
- Colias caucasica Staudinger, 1871
- Colias chippewa Edwards, 1872
- Colias chrysotheme (Esper, [1781])
- Colias croceus (Fourcroy, 1785)
- Colias erate (Esper, [1803])
- Colias fieldii Menetries, 1855
- Colias hecla Lefebvre, 1836
- Colias heos (Herbst, 1792)
- Colias hyale (Linnaeus, 1758)
- Colias hyperborea Grum-Grshimailo, 1899
- Colias myrmidone (Esper,[1777])
- Colias nastes Boisduval, 1832
- Colias palaeno (Linnaeus, 1761)
- Colias tamerlana Staudinger, 1897
- Colias thisoa Menetries, 1832
- Colias tyche (Bober, 1812)

genus: Euchloe

- Euchloe ausonia (Hübner, [1804])
- Euchloe creusa (Doubleday, [1847])
- Euchloe ochracea (Trybom, 1877) described from Mongolian Altai (Shadzgat-Nuruu Mountains)

genus: Gonepteryx

- Gonepteryx amintha (Blanchard, 1871) Ussuri
- Gonepteryx aspasia Menetries, 1859
- Gonepteryx maxima Butler, 1885
- Gonepteryx rhamni (Linnaeus, 1758)

genus: Leptidea

- Leptidea amurensis (Menetries, 1859)
- Leptidea duponcheli (Staudinger, 1871) South Europran Russia, Transcaucasia, Caucasus, Crimea
- Leptidea morsei (Fenton, 1881)
- Leptidea reali Reissinger, 1989
- Leptidea sinapis (Linnaeus, 1758)

genus: Pieris

- Pieris brassicae (Linnaeus, 1758)
- Pieris bryoniae (Hübner, [1805])
- Pieris canidia (Sparrman, 1768)
- Pieris dulcinea (Butler, 1882) Amur, Ussuri, Russian Far East, Sakhalin, Kuriles
- Pieris euorientis Verity, [1908] Altai Mountains, Yakutia
- Pieris melete Menetries, 1857 Amur, Ussuri
- Pieris napi (Linnaeus, 1758)
- Pieris pseudonapi Verity, 1911 may be synonym of Pieris dulcinea
- Pieris rapae (Linnaeus, 1758)
- Pieris tomariana Matsumura, 1928 Kuriles

genus: Pontia

- Pontia callidice (Hübner, [1800])
- Pontia chloridice (Hübner, [1813])
- Pontia daplidice (Linnaeus, 1758)
- Pontia edusa (Fabricius, 1777)

genus: Zegris

- Zegris eupheme (Esper, [1805])
- Zegris pyrothoe (Eversmann, 1832) Southwest Siberia

== Riodinidae ==
genus: Hamearis

- Hamearis lucina (Linnaeus, 1758)

== See also ==
- List of moths of Russia
- List of the butterflies of Saint Petersburg and Leningrad Oblast
- List of ecoregions in Russia
