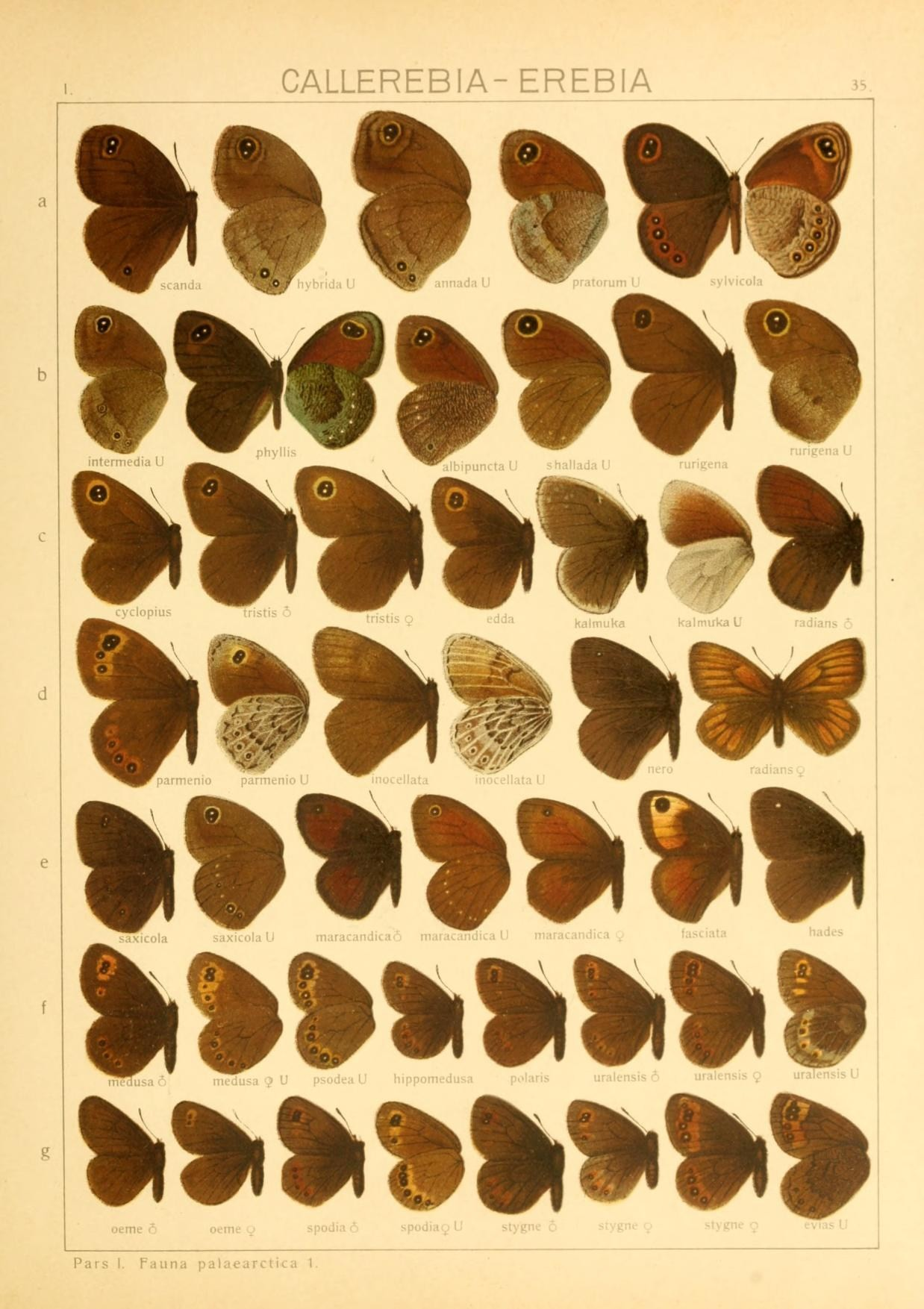
- Erebia kindermanni in Seitz 36e

Scientific classification
- Domain: Eukaryota
- Kingdom: Animalia
- Phylum: Arthropoda
- Class: Insecta
- Order: Lepidoptera
- Family: Nymphalidae
- Genus: Erebia
- Species: E. kindermanni

Binomial name
- Erebia kindermanni Staudinger, 1881

= Erebia kindermanni =

Species of butterfly

Erebia kindermanni is a butterfly found in the East Palearctic (Altai) that belongs to the browns family. Subspecies E. k. sarytavica Lukhtanov, 1990 is found in South Altai.

== Description from Seitz ==
E. kindermanni Stgr. (36 e). Somewhat smaller than maurisius, but closely allied to the same. The brown macular band rather broad, the cell distally brown; in the female the whole central area as far as the band with a brown tint. The hindwing has 5—6 russet-brown spots, which are ovate in the male and a little smaller and rounded in the female. On the underside the central area of the forewing is brown, the macular band being somewhat broader than above but less prominent. The two marginal spots in cellules 4 and 5 of the forewing and the three in cellules 2—4- of the hindwing have in the centre a very small black dot only in the female. — From the Altai.

== See also ==
- List of butterflies of Russia
