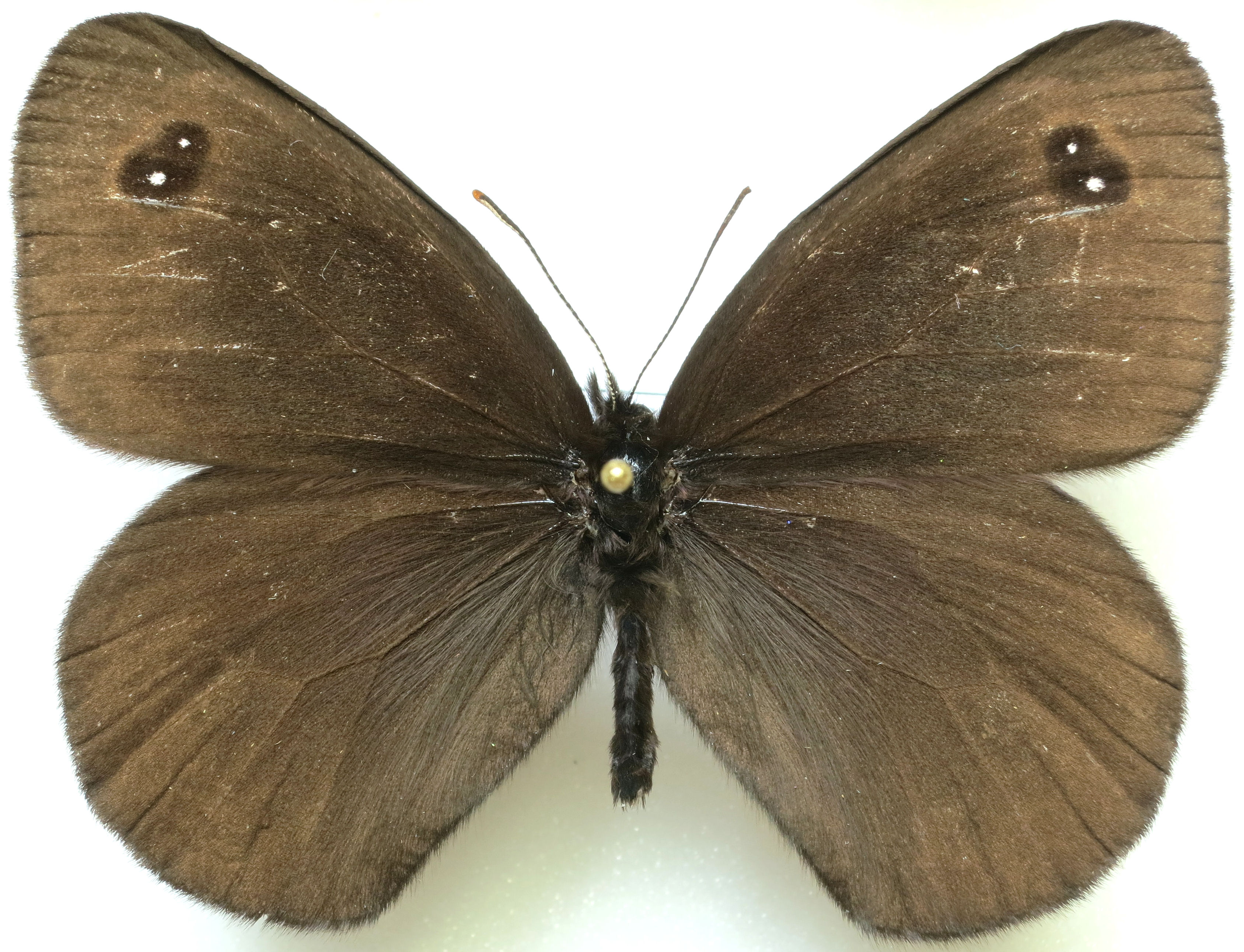
- E. wanga - Shkotovsky District, Primorsky Krai, Russia

Scientific classification
- Domain: Eukaryota
- Kingdom: Animalia
- Phylum: Arthropoda
- Class: Insecta
- Order: Lepidoptera
- Family: Nymphalidae
- Genus: Erebia
- Species: E. wanga

Binomial name
- Erebia wanga Bremer, 1864

= Erebia wanga =

Species of butterfly

Erebia wanga is a butterfly found in the East Palearctic (Amur) that belongs to the browns family.

== Description from Seitz ==
E. tristis Brem. (= wanga Brem.) (35c). Very similar to the preceding E. cyclopius, with which it agrees in size, shape and ground-colour. The yellow border of the double ocellus is narrower and somewhat dull in the male, and broader and light yellow in the female. The border of the ocellus is yellow on the underside of both sexes, being broader than above. The hindwing beneath is thinly dusted with whitish in the male and bears a small white spot at the apex of the cell. In the female the underside of the hindwing is more densely dusted with whitish, the dark dentate median band therefore being more prominent than in the male, in which sex it contrasts but little with the ground. Before the distal margin there is an arched, narrow, dark dentate line, proximally to which there is a small white dot each in cellules 2 and 4. The antenna thinly ringed black and white, club above black, the tip and underside russet -yellow. The specimens from Blagovestshensk larger than those from Raddefka.

== See also ==
- List of butterflies of Russia
