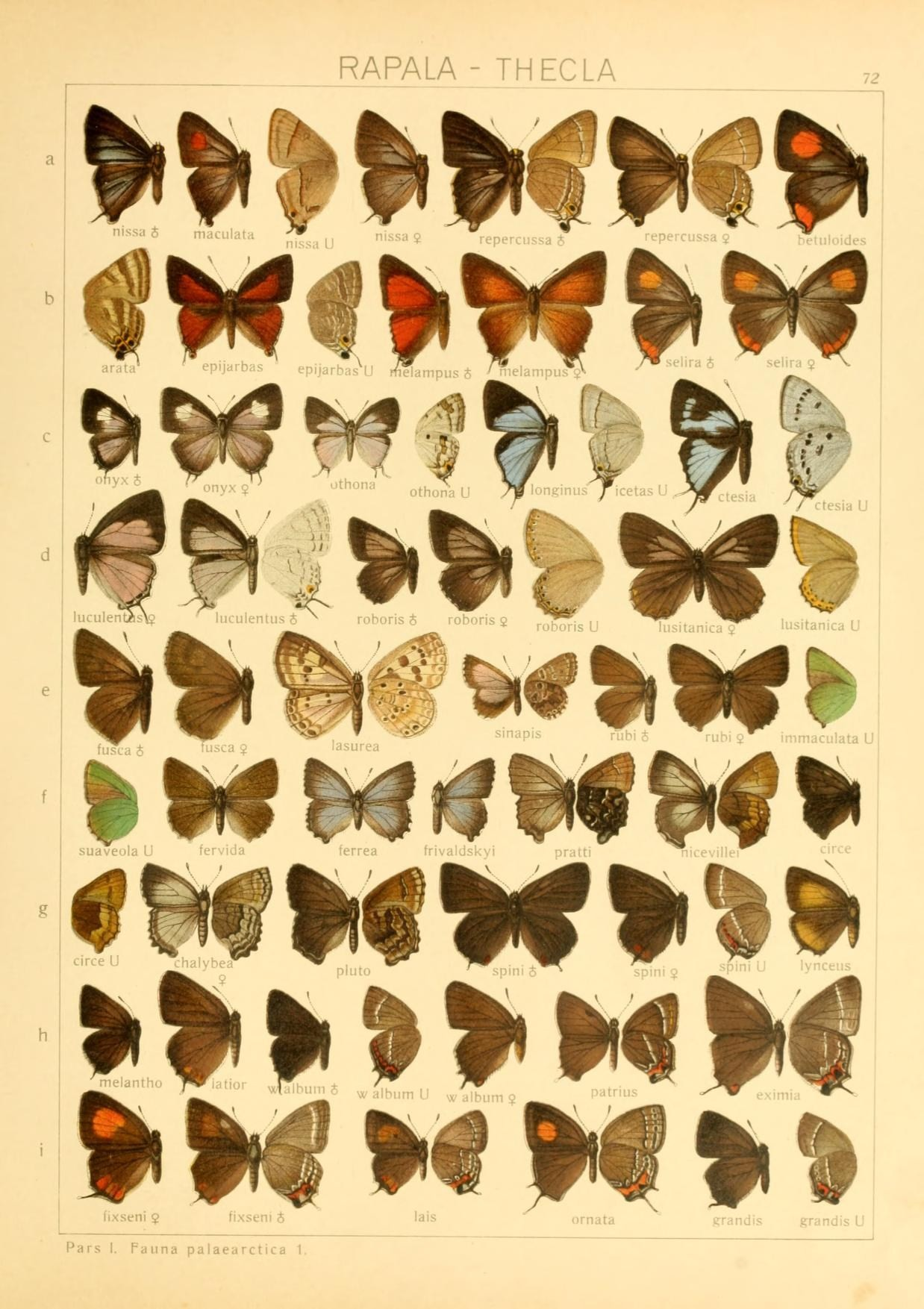
- Satyrium eximius in Seitz (72 h, i fixseni Leech)

Scientific classification
- Kingdom: Animalia
- Phylum: Arthropoda
- Clade: Pancrustacea
- Class: Insecta
- Order: Lepidoptera
- Family: Lycaenidae
- Genus: Satyrium
- Species: S. eximius

Binomial name
- Satyrium eximius (Fixsen, 1887)

= Satyrium eximius =

Species of butterfly

Satyrium eximius is a butterfly found in the East Palearctic that belongs to the blues family.

== Subspecies ==
- S. e. eximia Ussuri, Korea
- S. e. zhejianganum Tong, 1994 Zhejiang
- S. e. mushanum Matsumura, 1929 Taiwan

== Description from Seitz ==
T. eximia Fixs. (= affinis Stgr.) (72 h). Much larger [than w-album ]; above with a large scent-patch in the male and a red spot on the anal lobe. The red anal band of the hindwing beneath is very distinct and its continuation forwards white, the tip of the tail also thinly white, ab. fixseni Leech (72 i) differs, besides themuch more variegated underside, in the forewing above bearing the yellowish red discal spot already mentioned in the other species, and in the anal markings of the hindwing above being larger. — Both forms, eximia and fixseni fly together in Amurland, Corea, Central and West China, Mongolia and Manchuria. They occur in August and are apparently not rare.

== Biology ==
The larva on feeds on Rhamnus diamantiaca

== See also ==
- List of butterflies of Russia
