= Erebia jeniseiensis =

Erebia fletcheri

Scientific classification
- Domain: Eukaryota
- Kingdom: Animalia
- Phylum: Arthropoda
- Class: Insecta
- Order: Lepidoptera
- Family: Nymphalidae
- Genus: Erebia
- Species: E. jeniseiensis

Binomial name
- Erebia jeniseiensis Trybom, 1877

Species of butterfly

Erebia jeniseiensis is a butterfly found in the East Palearctic (Altai, Tuva, North Mongolia, South Siberia, Sakhalin, Magadan region) that belongs to the browns family. E. jeniseiensis Trybom (= velox Herz) is distributed in Central and North-East Siberia, is a form [of E. euryale] in which the black dots are thinly edged with russet-yellow. The hindwing above is mostly without markings, bearing beneath a narrow white band.

== See also ==
- List of butterflies of Russia
