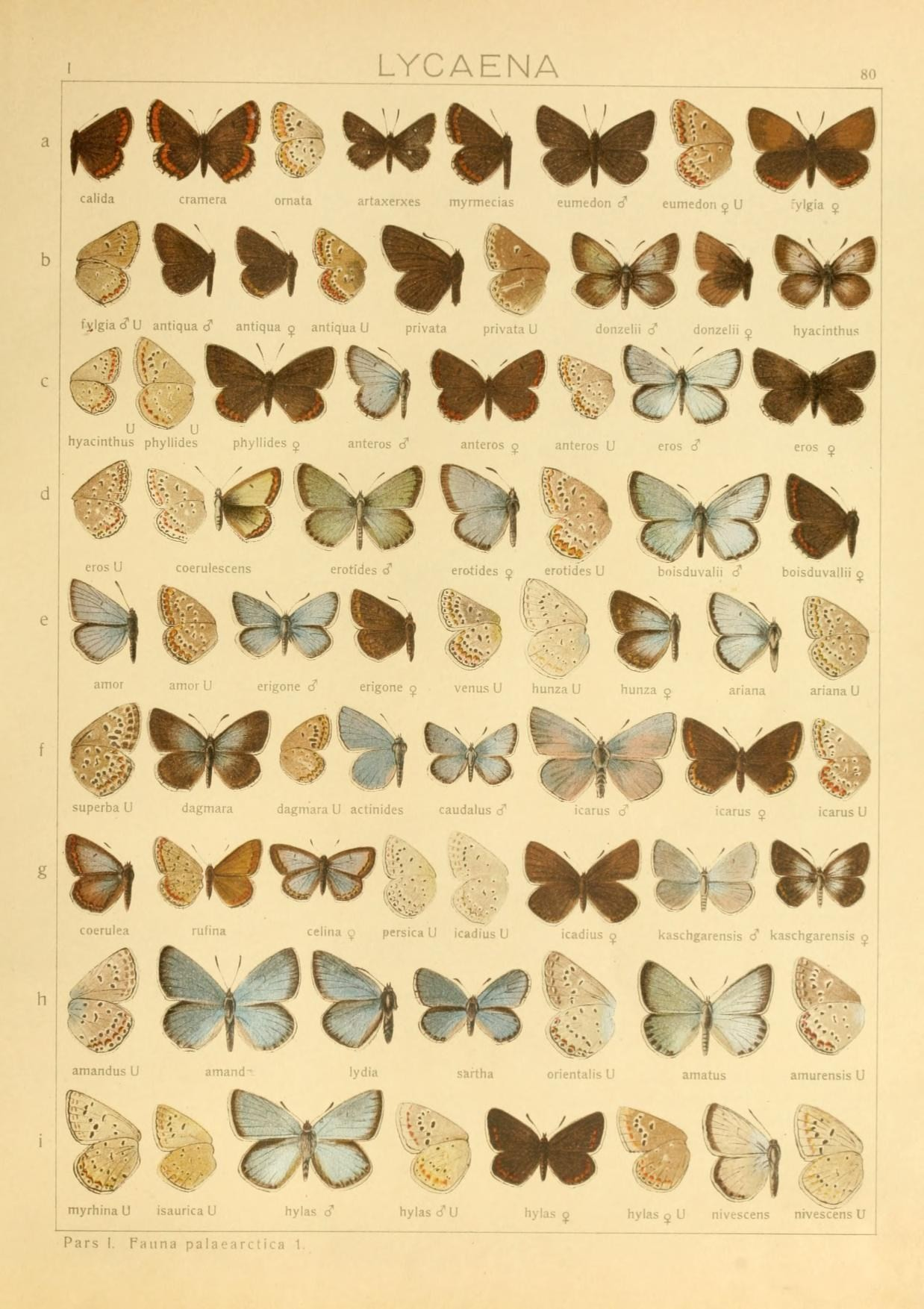
- Polyommatus icadius in Seitz 80 g

Scientific classification
- Kingdom: Animalia
- Phylum: Arthropoda
- Class: Insecta
- Order: Lepidoptera
- Family: Lycaenidae
- Genus: Polyommatus
- Species: P. icadius

Binomial name
- Polyommatus icadius (Grum-Grshimailo, 1890)

= Polyommatus icadius =

Species of butterfly

Polyommatus icadius is a butterfly found in the East Palearctic that belongs to the blues family.

== Subspecies ==
- P. i. icadius Pamirs
- P. i. morkeleb Korb, 2000 Darvaz
- P. i. candidus Zhdanko, 2000 Tian-Shan
- P. i. cicero Ivonin & Kosterin, 2000 South Altai
- P. i. fominae Stradomsky, 2005 Caucasia

== Taxonomy ==
Formerly a subspecies of Polyommatus icarus.

== Description from Seitz ==
In ab. icadius [of icarus] Gr.-Grsh. (80 g) which occurs particularly in Anterior Asia, the borders of the ocelli are almost of the same colour as the ground and therefore scarcely visible, being much too distinct in our figure. The hindwing, moreover, has a slightly different shape in this form, which is perhaps on the way to develop into a local race.

== Biology ==
The larva feeds on Cicer songaricum, Cicer flexuosum

== See also ==
- List of butterflies of Russia
