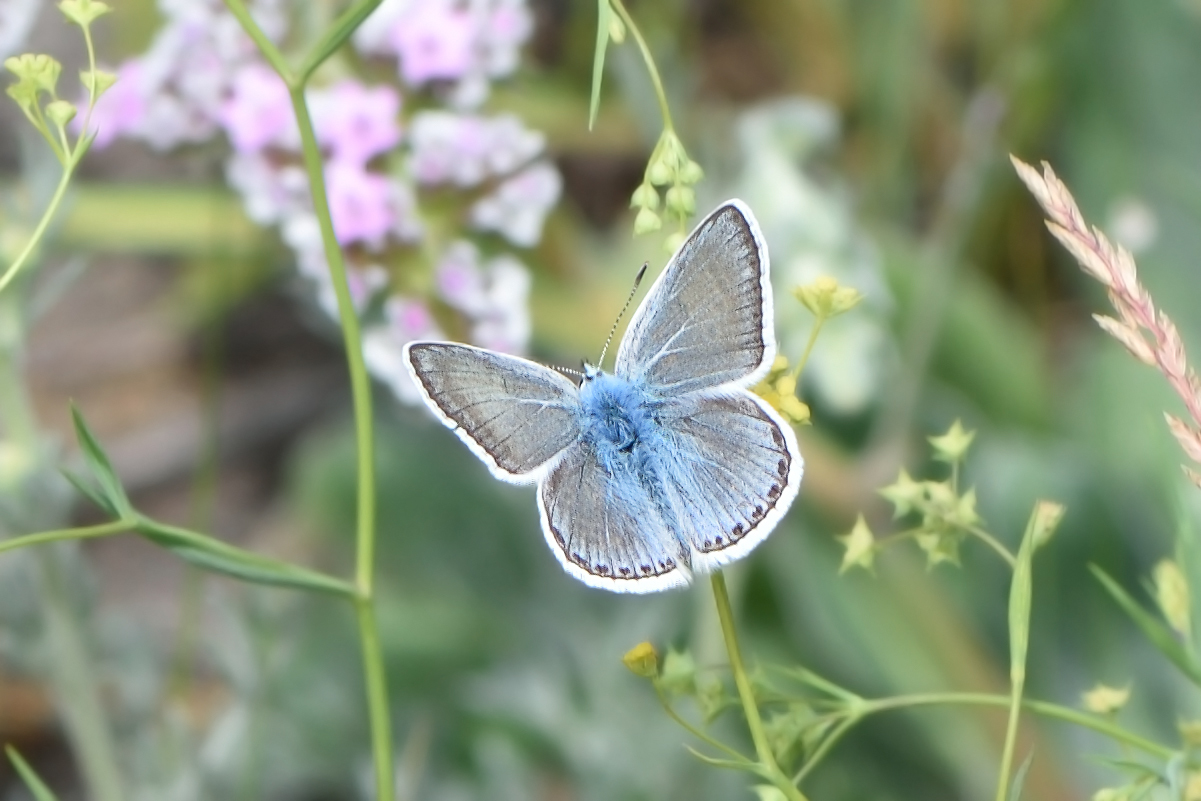

Scientific classification
- Kingdom: Animalia
- Phylum: Arthropoda
- Class: Insecta
- Order: Lepidoptera
- Family: Lycaenidae
- Genus: Polyommatus
- Species: P. erotides

Binomial name
- Polyommatus erotides (Staudinger, 1892)

= Polyommatus erotides =

Species of butterfly

Polyommatus erotides is a butterfly found in the East Palearctic (Saur, Altai, Siberia, Transbaikalia, Mongolia) that belongs to the blues family.

== Taxonomy ==
Formerly a subspecies of Polyommatus eros.

== Description from Seitz ==
erotides Stgr. (80 d), from the mountains of Southern Siberia, is a large, blue-green male form, with broad black distal margin to the forewing, into which the deep black veins merge.

== Biology ==
The larva feeds on Fabaceae.

== See also ==
- List of butterflies of Russia
