= Neolycaena davidi =

- Neolycaena davidi in Seitz 73f

Scientific classification
- Kingdom: Animalia
- Phylum: Arthropoda
- Clade: Pancrustacea
- Class: Insecta
- Order: Lepidoptera
- Family: Lycaenidae
- Genus: Neolycaena
- Species: N. davidi

Binomial name
- Neolycaena davidi (Oberthur, 1881)

Species of butterfly

Neolycaena davidi is a small butterfly found in the East Palearctic (Transbaikalia, Mongolia, Northeast China, East Tibet) that belongs to the lycaenids or blues family.

== Description from Seitz ==
davidi Oberth. (73 f) has on the underside broader and more dispersed white spots, which are not accompanied by distinct dark dots as in nymotypical fengstroemi North China and Mongolia.

== Biology ==
The larva feeds on Caragana microphylla, C. pygmaea, C. spinosa

== Etymology ==
The name honours Armand David.

== See also ==
- List of butterflies of Russia
