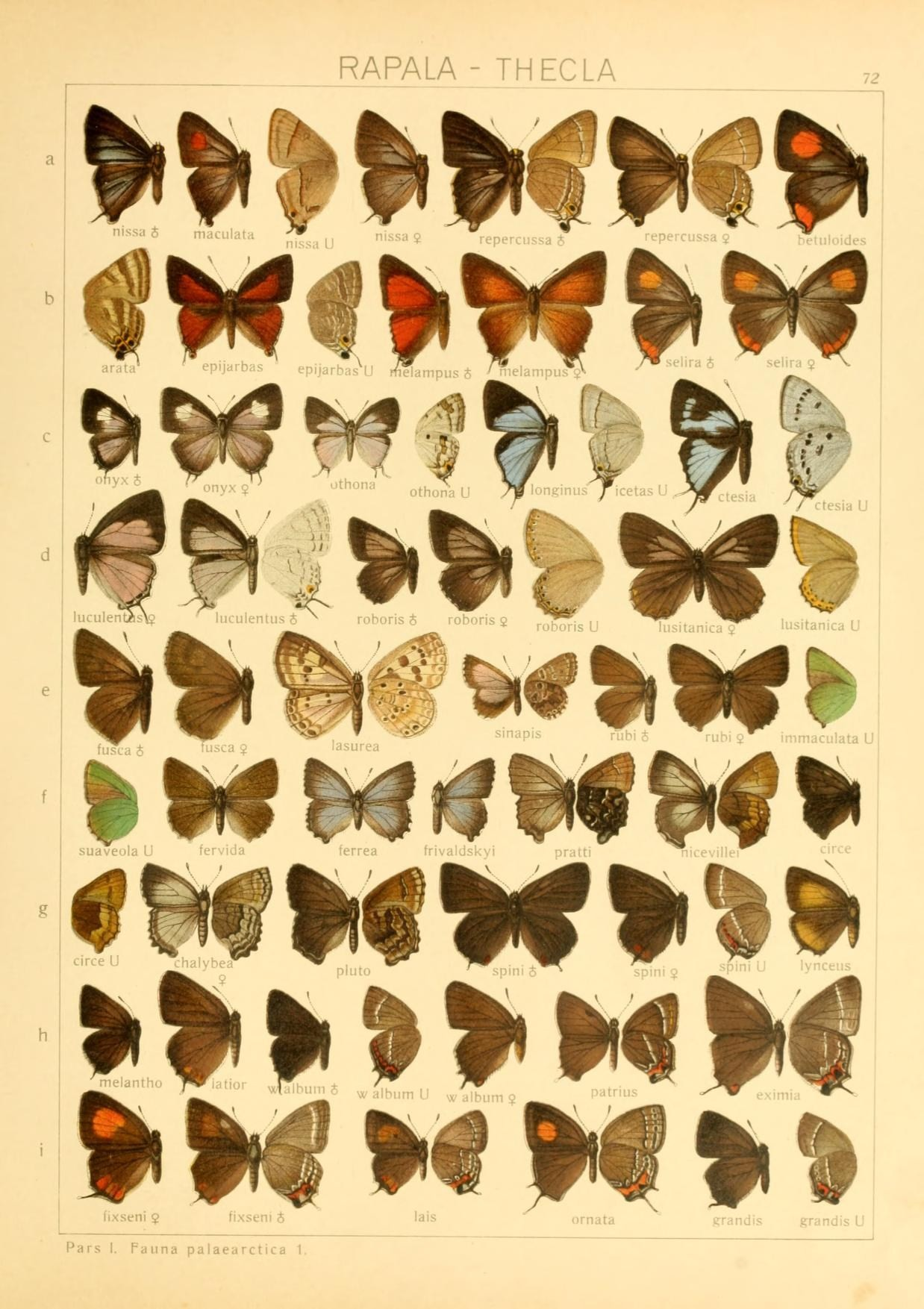
- Rapala arata in Seitz 72b

Scientific classification
- Kingdom: Animalia
- Phylum: Arthropoda
- Class: Insecta
- Order: Lepidoptera
- Family: Lycaenidae
- Genus: Rapala
- Species: R. arata

Binomial name
- Rapala arata (Bremer, 1861)

= Rapala atara =

Species of butterfly

Rapala arata is a small butterfly found in the East Palearctic (Amur, Ussuri, Sakhalin, Kuriles, Northeast China, Korea, Japan) that belongs to the lycaenids or blues family.

== Description from Seitz ==
D. arata Brem. (= ichnographia Btlr.) (72b). Above sooty black-brown, both wings of the male with a feeble violet sheen, the forewing shiny metallic blue at the base below the cell. On the anal lobe of the hindwing usually an orange-yellow spot of variable size. On the underside of both wings there are wedge- shaped dark shadowy bands parallel with the distal margin, one close to the margin, the other near the cell; in the anal area black dots on a golden yellow ground. In Amurland, nearly throughout China, Corea and Japan. Fixsen mentions from Corea a form which has the red discal spot on the forewing occurring also in the other species, and may be named ab. luniger ab. nov. The smaller ab. tyrianthina Btlr. has the ground colour of the underside darker and the black-brown wedge-shaped bands are partly confluent : among the nymotypical form. — The butterflies are not plentiful in most districts, occurring from May until July, particularly on road-sides and the edges of woods. This insect, hitherto placed in Rapala, belongs to Deudorix on account of the absence of the scent-tuft in the male and of the facies as well as markings, as has kindly pointed out to me by Monsieur Courvoisier The larva feeds on Fabaceae, Saxifragaceae, Ericaceae, Rhamnaceae, Fagaceae.

== See also ==
- List of butterflies of Russia
