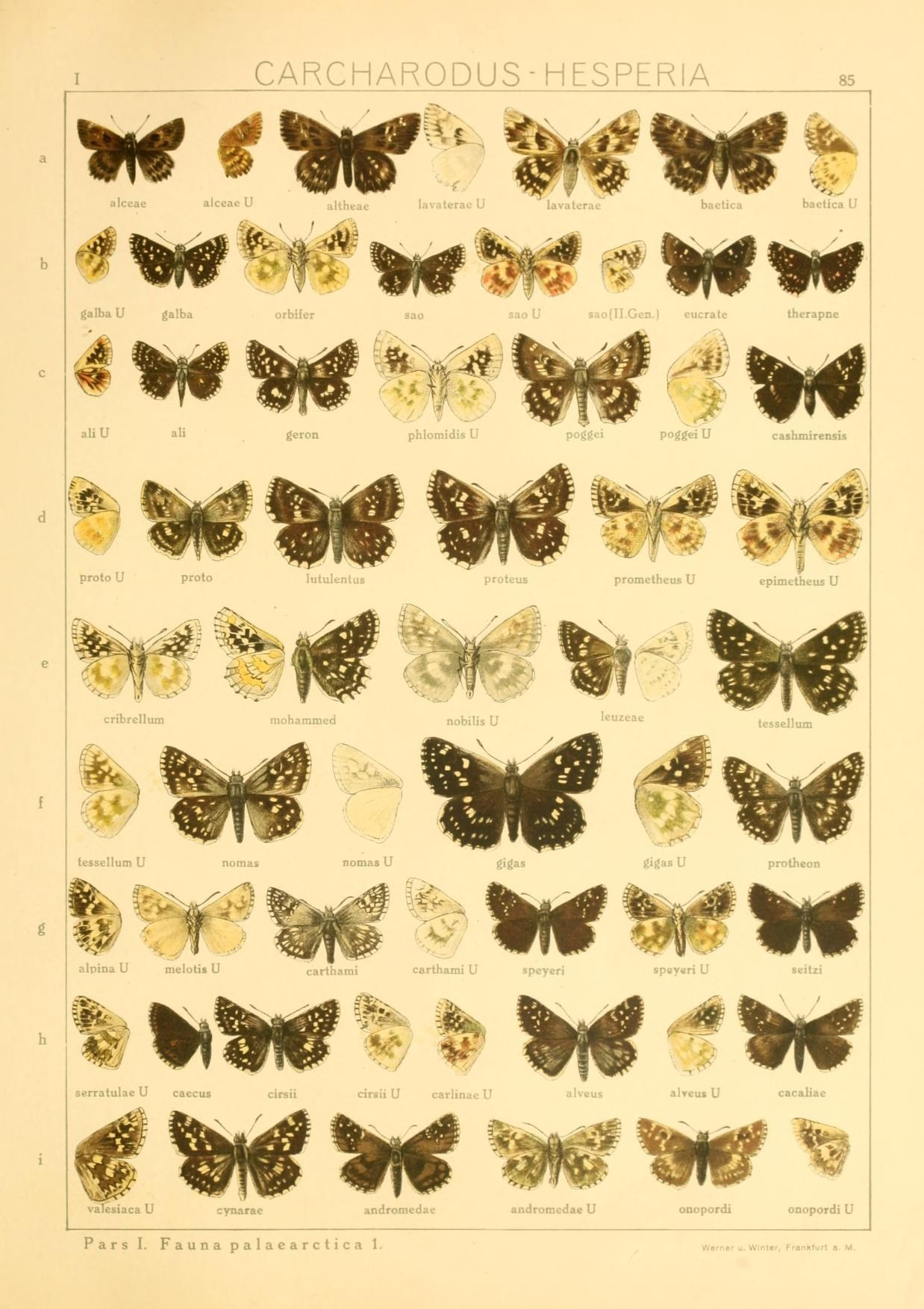
- Pyrgus speyeri in Seitz 85 g

Scientific classification
- Domain: Eukaryota
- Kingdom: Animalia
- Phylum: Arthropoda
- Class: Insecta
- Order: Lepidoptera
- Family: Hesperiidae
- Genus: Pyrgus
- Species: P. speyeri

Binomial name
- Pyrgus speyeri (Staudinger, 1887)

Synonyms
- Scelothrix speyeri Staudinger, 1887

= Pyrgus speyeri =

Species of skipper butterfly genus Pyrgus

Pyrgus speyeri is a small butterfly found in the East Palearctic (Sayan, Transbaikalia, Amur, Ussuri) that belongs to the skippers family.

== Description from Seitz ==
H. Speyeri Stgr. (85 g). On both sides darker than the preceding (H. carthami), the spots of the forewing above smaller; the first spot of the median band of the hindwing beneath, situated in interspace 6, is absent, being sometimes represented by an indistinct smear. Otherwise similar to serrutulae. Amurland, Ussuri, and Dauria. — In seitzi form nov. (85 g). of which 1 have a female from Sajan, the upperside of the wings is uniformly black, the forewing bearing an indistinct grey diffuse discocellular half-moon. Fringes white, interrupted by conspicuous black spots.. On the underside the apex of the wing is dark grey, the centre blackish; a spot in the cell, a discocellular arc, in interspace 10 a streak, further three small apical spots, and six dots forming an oblique curved row from interspace 6 to 2; these dots small, white, non-transparent. Hindwing olive-black, with three spots at the base, three larger ones close together, situated at the costa and vein 4, moreover a spot in interspace 1 b. Subterminal row of dots as in speyeri, but less prominent.

== See also ==
- List of butterflies of Russia
