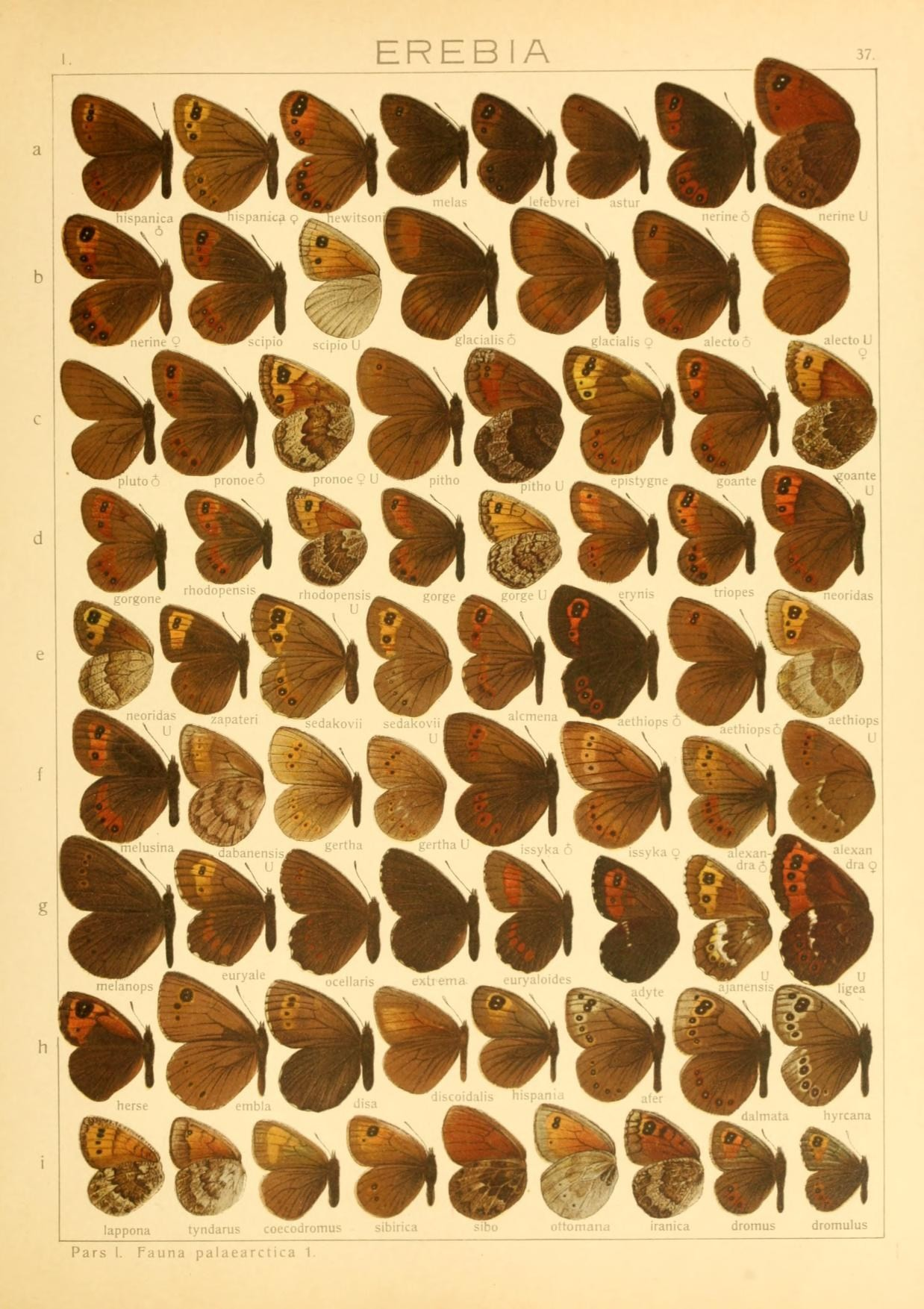
- Erebia ajanensis in Seitz 37g

Scientific classification
- Domain: Eukaryota
- Kingdom: Animalia
- Phylum: Arthropoda
- Class: Insecta
- Order: Lepidoptera
- Family: Nymphalidae
- Genus: Erebia
- Species: E. ajanensis

Binomial name
- Erebia ajanensis Ménétriés, 1857

= Erebia ajanensis =

Species of butterfly

Erebia ajanensis is a butterfly found in the East Palearctic (China, Korea, Amur, Ussuri, Magadan) that belongs to the browns family.

- Erebia ajanensis ajanensis North Amur
- Erebia ajanensis arsenjevi Kurentzov, 1950 Ussuri
- Erebia ajanensis kosterini Gorbunov, Korshunov & Dubatolov, 1995 Magadan (Koni Peninsula)

== Description from Seitz ==
ajanensis Men. (= eumonia Men.) (37 g), from the Amur and Ussuri, differs but little from the nymotypical form [of ligea]. The white band on the hindwing beneath is broader and more continuous, there being some obsolescent white spots near the base, which are occasionally also found in the nymotypical

== See also ==
- List of butterflies of Russia
