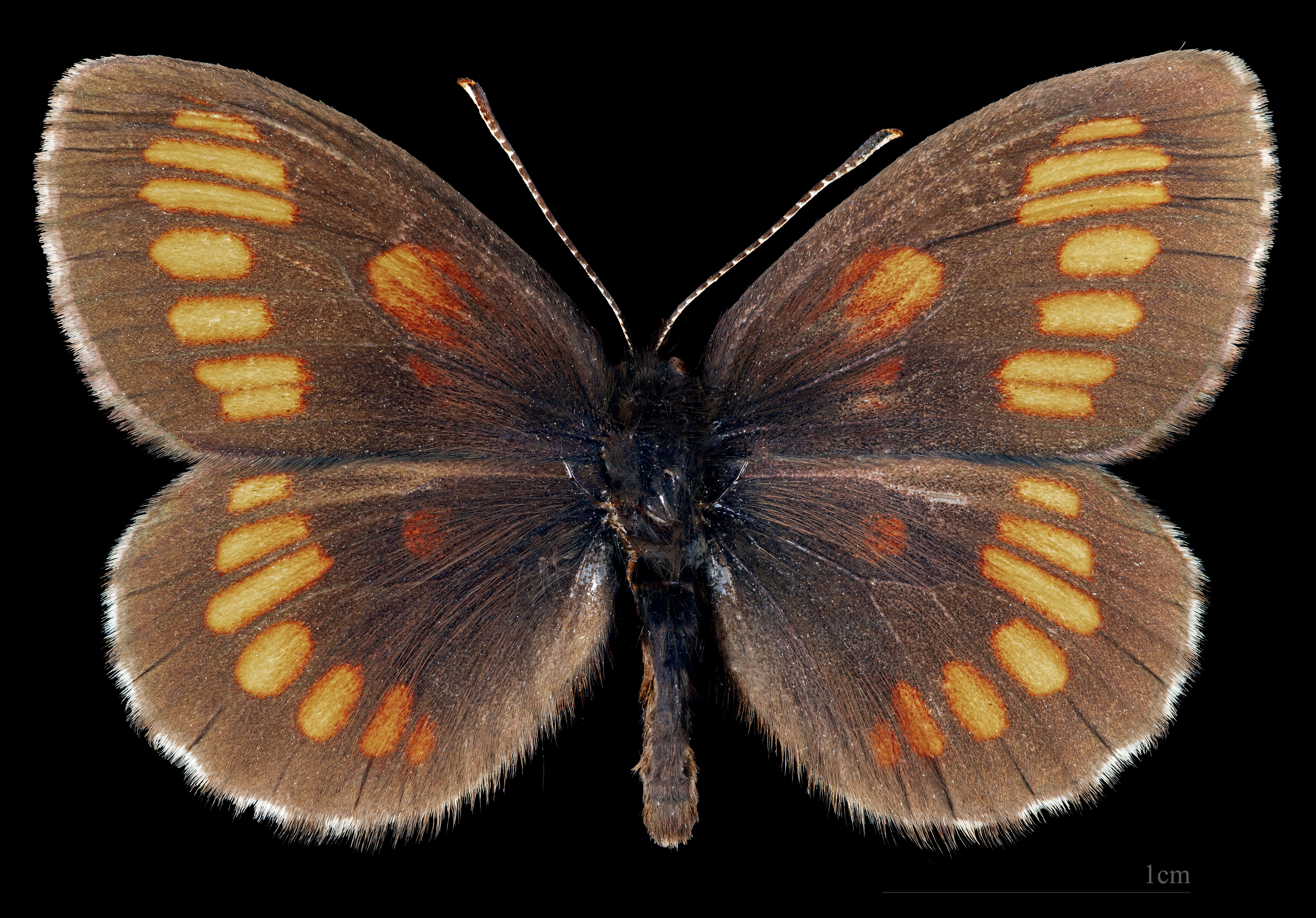
- Erebia theano theano male dorsal
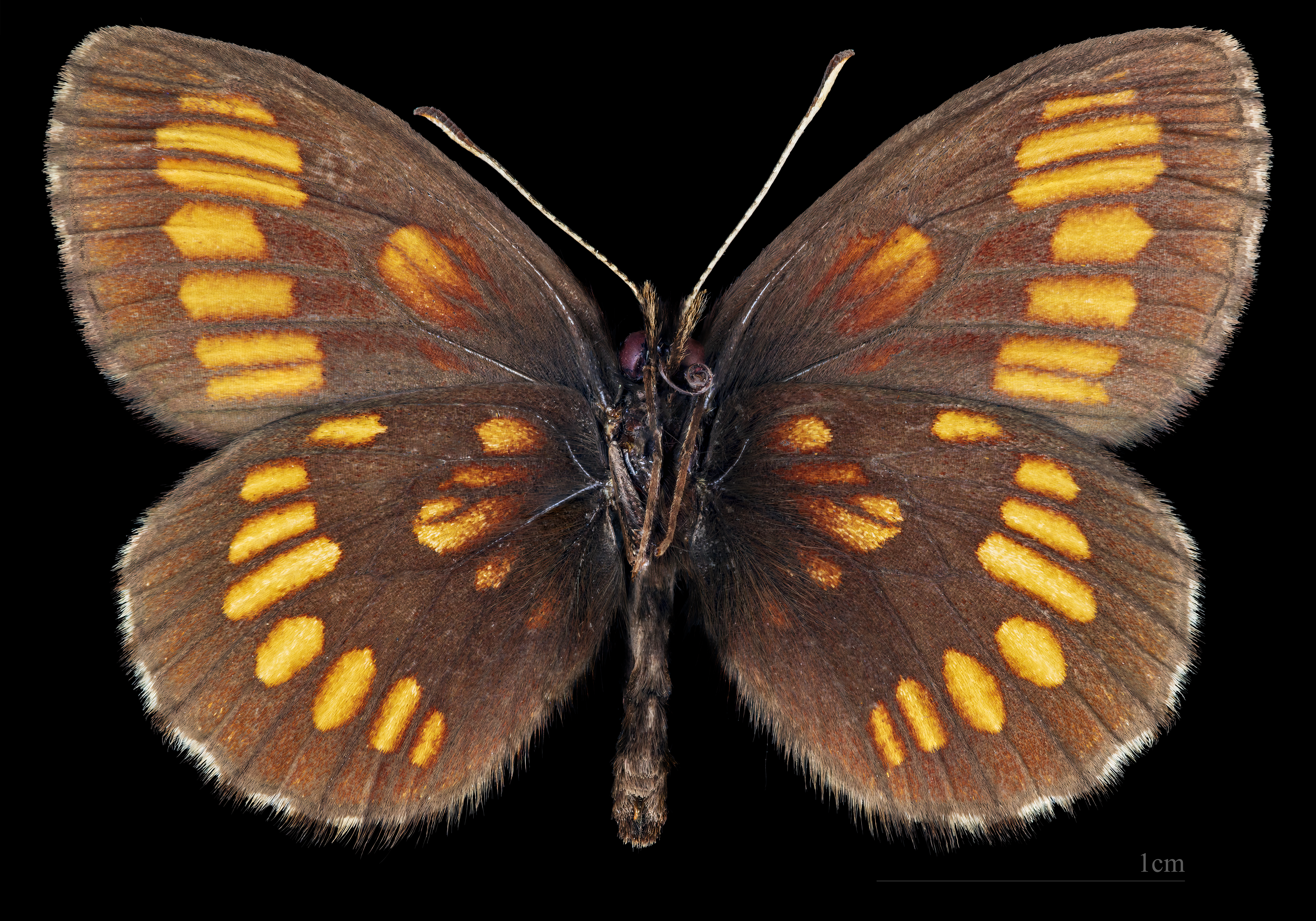
- Erebia theano theano male ventral

Scientific classification
- Kingdom: Animalia
- Phylum: Arthropoda
- Class: Insecta
- Order: Lepidoptera
- Family: Nymphalidae
- Genus: Erebia
- Species: E. theano

Binomial name
- Erebia theano (Tauscher, 1806)

= Erebia theano =

Species of butterfly

Erebia theano is a butterfly found in the East Palearctic that belongs to the browns family.

== Subspecies ==
- Erebia theano theano
- Erebia theano approximata Warren, 1930 Altai
- Erebia theano tshugunovi Korshunov & Ivonin, 1995 West Siberia
- Erebia theano shoria Korshunov & Ivonin, 1995 Kuznetsky Alatau

== Biology ==
The larva feeds on Poaceae.

== See also ==
- List of butterflies of Russia
