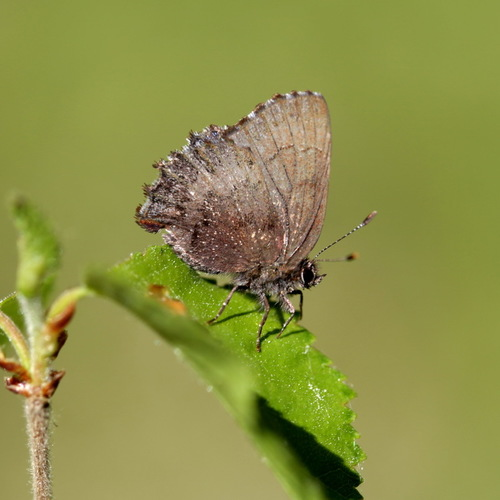

Scientific classification
- Kingdom: Animalia
- Phylum: Arthropoda
- Clade: Pancrustacea
- Class: Insecta
- Order: Lepidoptera
- Family: Lycaenidae
- Genus: Ahlbergia
- Species: A. frivaldszkyi

Binomial name
- Ahlbergia frivaldszkyi (Lederer, 1855)

Synonyms
- Thecla frivaldszkyi Lederer, 1855 (basionym)

= Ahlbergia frivaldszkyi =

Species of butterfly

Ahlbergia frivaldszkyi is a species of butterfly found in Russia and the East Palearctic that belongs to the lycaenids or blues family. The larva feeds on Spiraea japonica. It was described by Julius Lederer in 1853 as Thecla frivaldszkyi.

== Description from Seitz ==
In 1909, Adalbert Seitz wrote:

frivaldszkyi Led. (= coerulescens Motsch.) (72 f). Above blackish brown, dusted with bluish grey, particularly at the base, male with a very small yellow scent-patch at the edge of the cell; hindwing with curved median bands which form the border of the darker basal area. Extending from the Altai through Central Asia, Siberia and Mongolia to Amurland. — ferrea Btlr. (= frivaldszkyi Pryer) (72 f) is the eastern form from Corea and Japan; it is larger, the upperside being more evenly dusted with iron-grey to the margin and the orange-yellow scent-patch of the male being much larger. Not rare from March into June; the butterflies belong in Japan to the very first species in the spring.

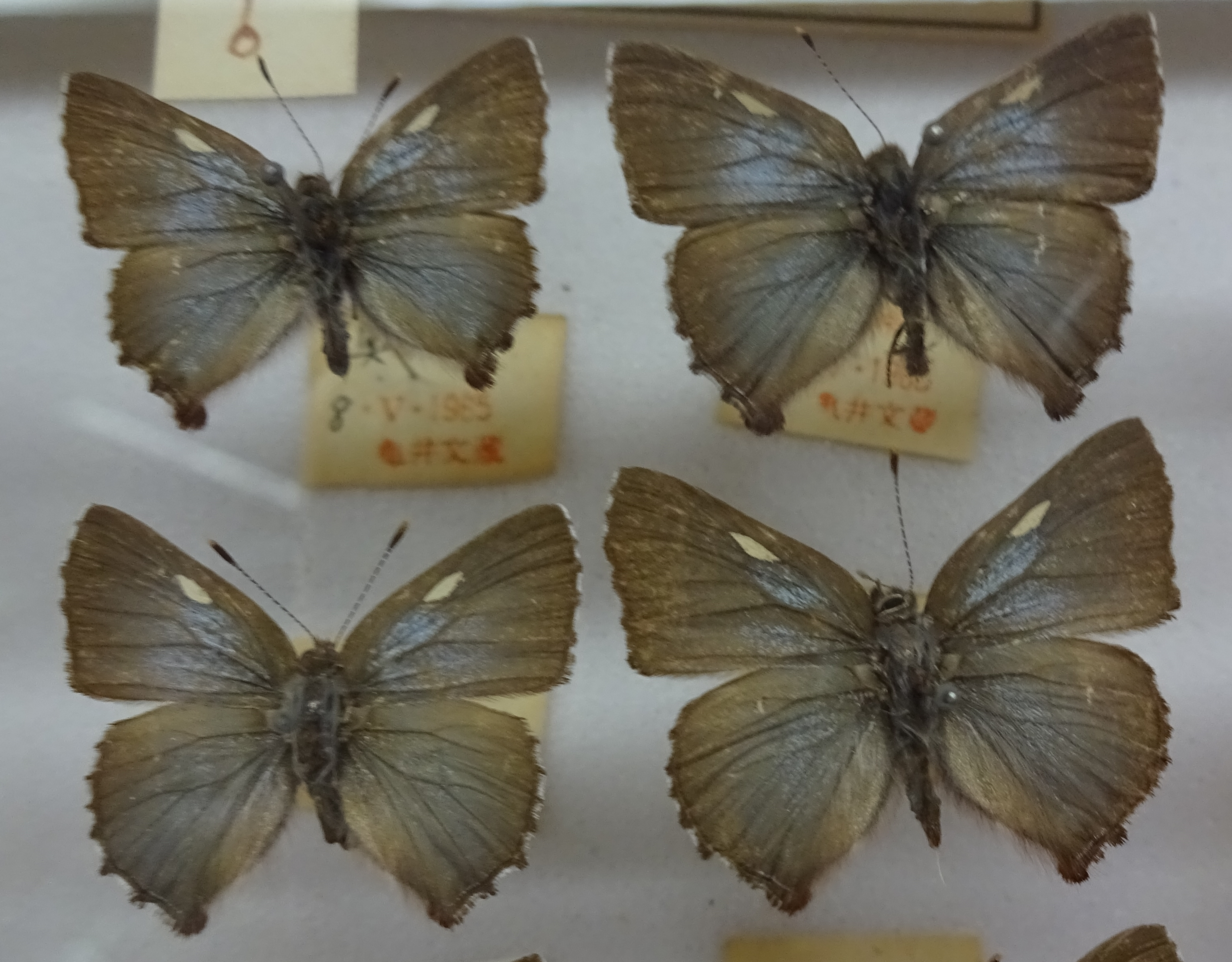
Ahlbergia ferrea

== See also ==
- List of butterflies of Russia
