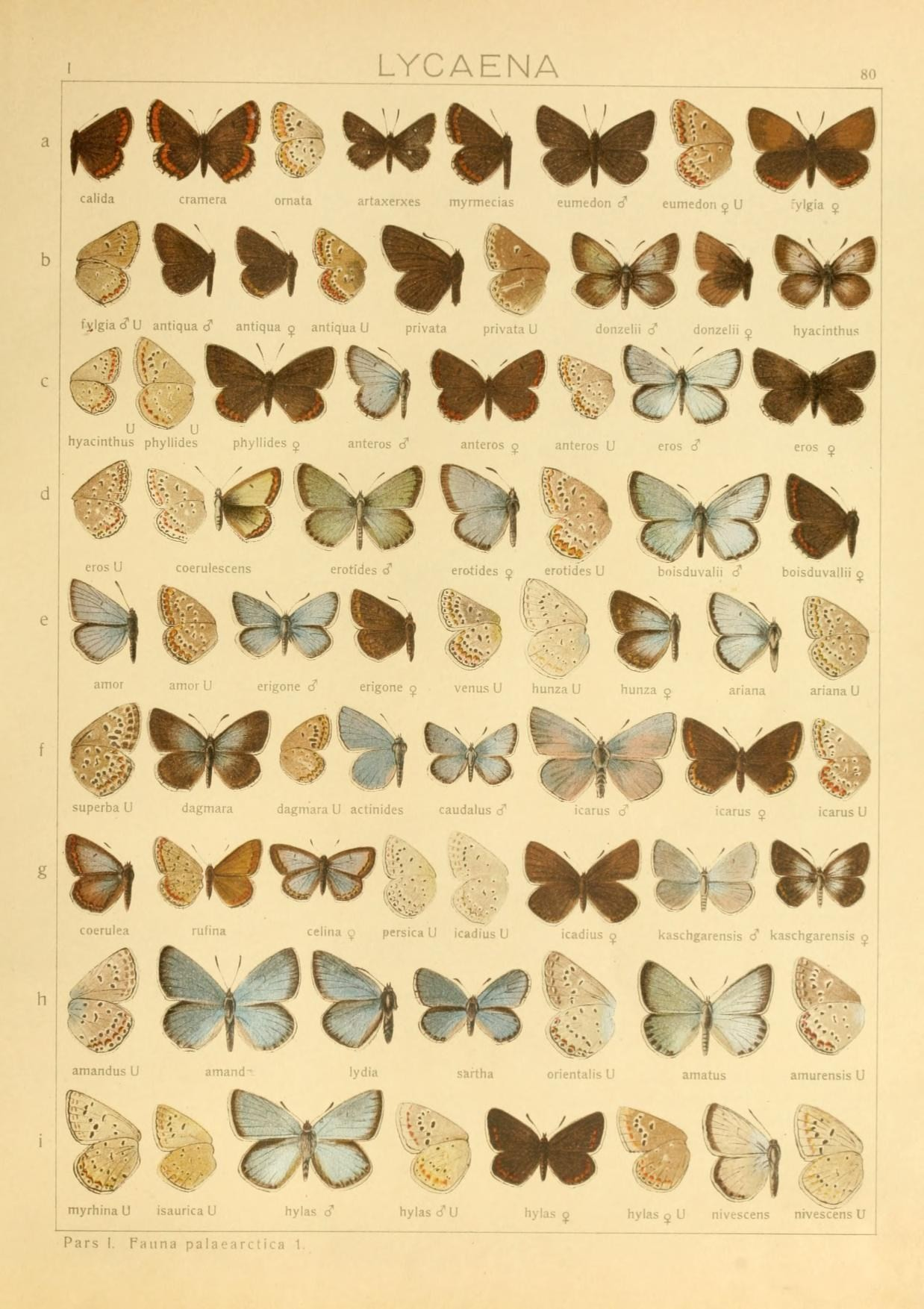
- Polyommatus boisduvalii in Seitz 80 d

Scientific classification
- Kingdom: Animalia
- Phylum: Arthropoda
- Clade: Pancrustacea
- Class: Insecta
- Order: Lepidoptera
- Family: Lycaenidae
- Genus: Polyommatus
- Species: P. boisduvalii

Binomial name
- Polyommatus boisduvalii (Herrich-Schäffer, [1843])

= Polyommatus boisduvalii =

Species of butterfly

Polyommatus boisduvalii is a butterfly found in the Palearctic (East Germany, Czech Republic, Poland, Southern Europe, Siberia, Kazakhstan Altai) that belongs to the blues family.

== Taxonomy ==
Formerly a subspecies of Polyommatus eros.

== Description from Seitz ==
The males of the South Russian form [ of eros] boisduvalii H.-Schaff. (80 d) have again a different blue, being paler, purer, brighter, the outer margin of the forewing is broadly black, the black veins in the apical area of the forewing being thin but sharply marked.

== See also ==
- List of butterflies of Russia
