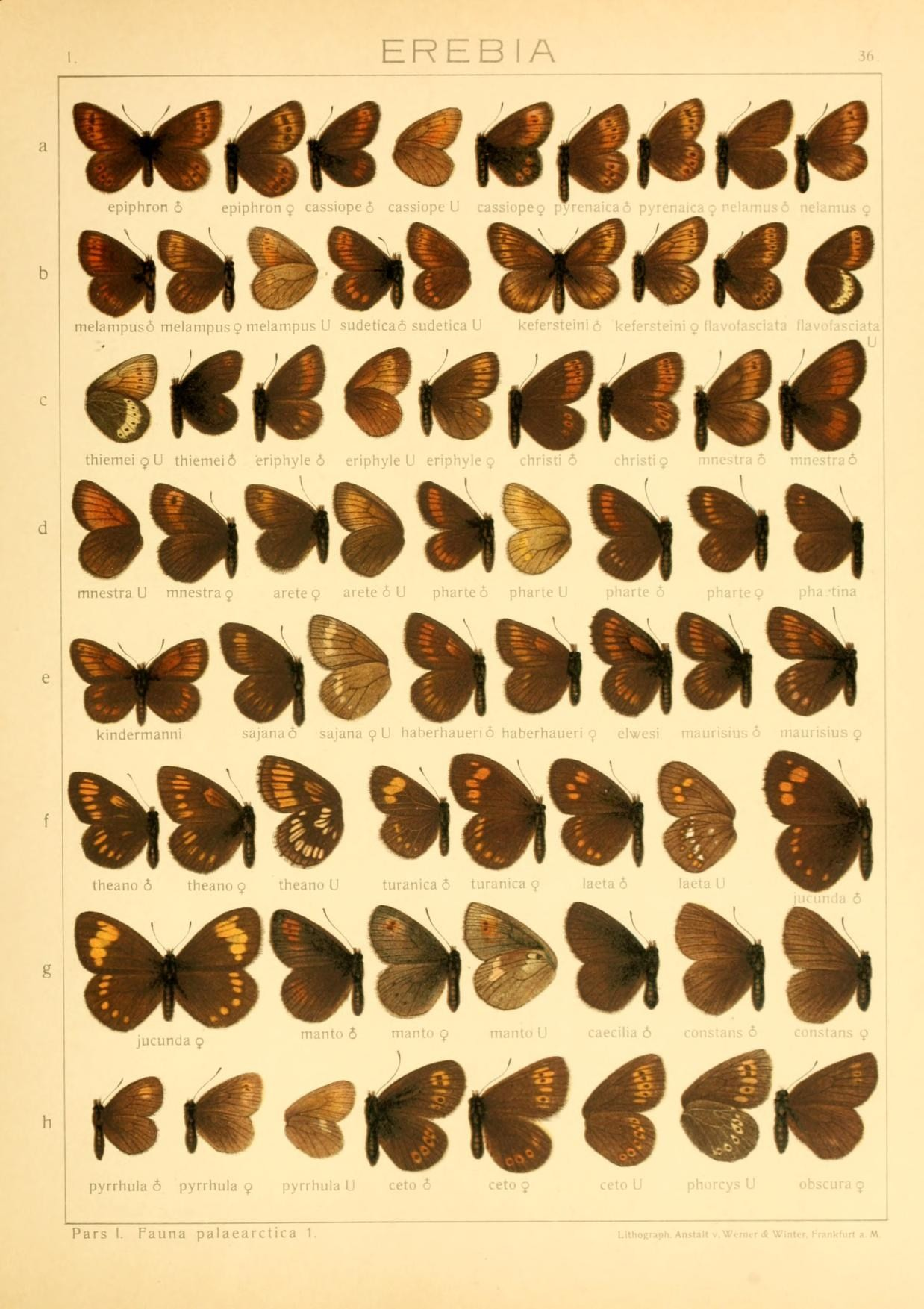
- Erebia kefersteini in Seitz 36b

Scientific classification
- Domain: Eukaryota
- Kingdom: Animalia
- Phylum: Arthropoda
- Class: Insecta
- Order: Lepidoptera
- Family: Nymphalidae
- Genus: Erebia
- Species: E. kefersteinii

Binomial name
- Erebia kefersteinii (Eversmann, 1851)

= Erebia kefersteinii =

Species of butterfly

Erebia kefersteinii is a butterfly found in the East Palearctic (Altai, Sayan, Tuva, North Mongolia.) that belongs to the browns family.

== Description from Seitz ==
kefersteini. Er. (36 b) is nearest to melampus and of the same size. The central area inclusive of the cell is brown-red, the base and the costal, distal and hindmargins being black-brown. In the male the reddish yellow distal band, which is divided into 6 spots by the veins, contrasts in colour but slightly with the central area and proximally gradually disappears in the latter. There are small black pupils in spots 2, 3 and 4 counted from the costal side. The underside is lighter, more greyish brown, the markings being as above. Among the few specimens examined there is one which essentially differs in markings: The forewing is black-brown, being centrally but little dusted with brown; the black dots are completely absent from the band of both wings. In the female the forewing is dark brown, the cell being more or less filled in with red-brown. There are 4 — 5 black ocelli in the spots of the transverse band, and the hindwing bears 4 red-brown ovate spots with black dots.

== See also ==
- List of butterflies of Russia
