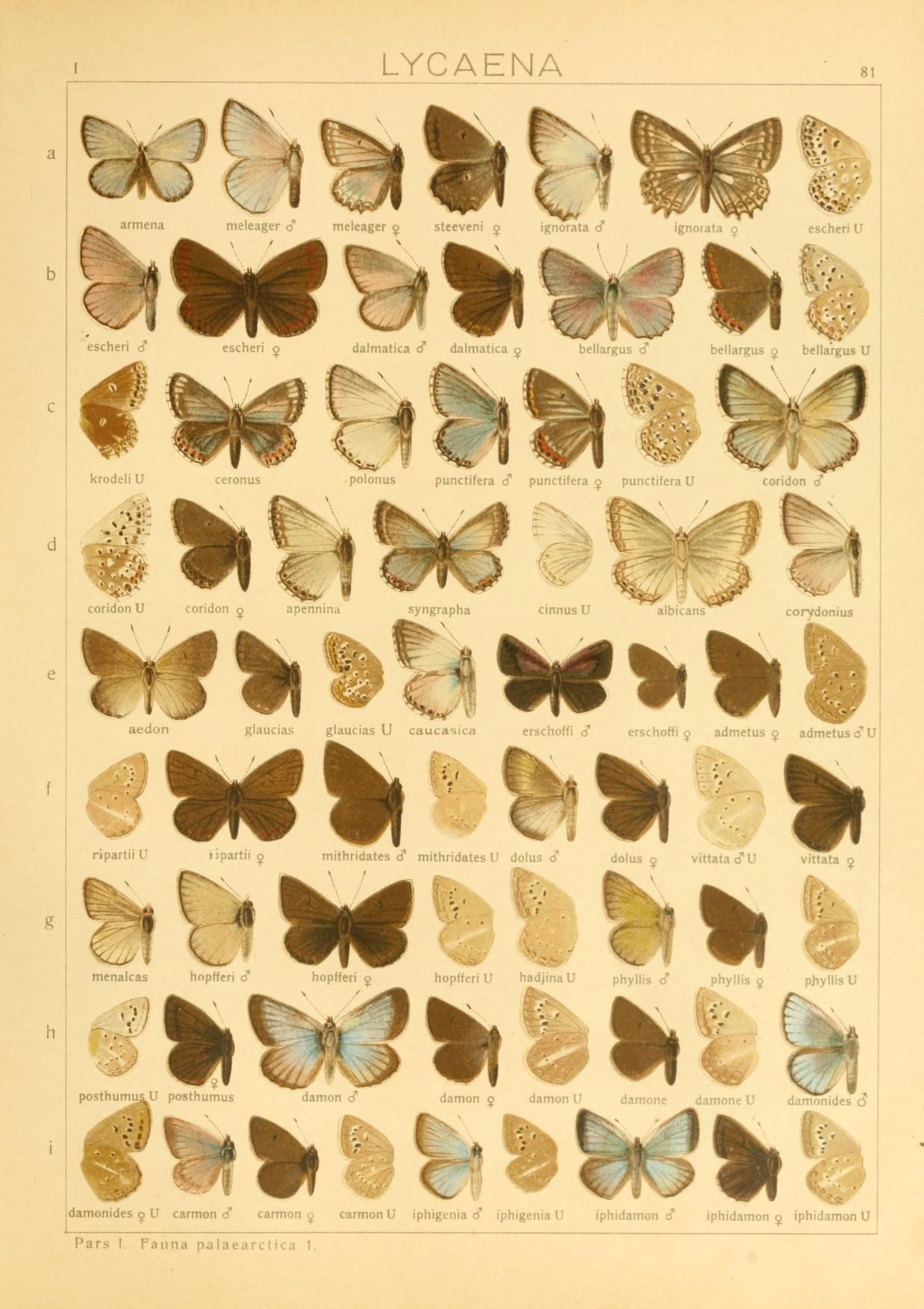
- Polyommatus phyllis in Seitz 81 g

Scientific classification
- Kingdom: Animalia
- Phylum: Arthropoda
- Class: Insecta
- Order: Lepidoptera
- Family: Lycaenidae
- Genus: Polyommatus
- Species: P. phyllis

Binomial name
- Polyommatus phyllis (Christoph, 1877)

= Polyommatus phyllis =

Species of butterfly

Polyommatus phyllis is a butterfly found in the Palearctic (North Iran, Kopet-Dagh) that belongs to the blues family.

== Description from Seitz ==
L. phyllis Christ. (81 g). Male above sea-green, with a silvery silky gloss; female dark brown, with a distinct discocellular spot on the forewing. On the underside both sexes have a very sharply defined conspicuous mesial streak which extends from the base across some ocelli to the outer margin. From Persia. — posthumus Christ. (81h) is a mountain-form. The male beneath was much more dusted with verdigris at the base, usually smaller and the upperside of a more bluish tinge. Female strongly marked with dark, the veins deeper black and more prominent. At Shakuh, but only at higher altitudes (9—11 000 ft.), while phyllis flies in abundance already low down in the valley.

== Biology ==
The larva feeds on Onobrychis cornuta

== See also ==
- List of butterflies of Russia
