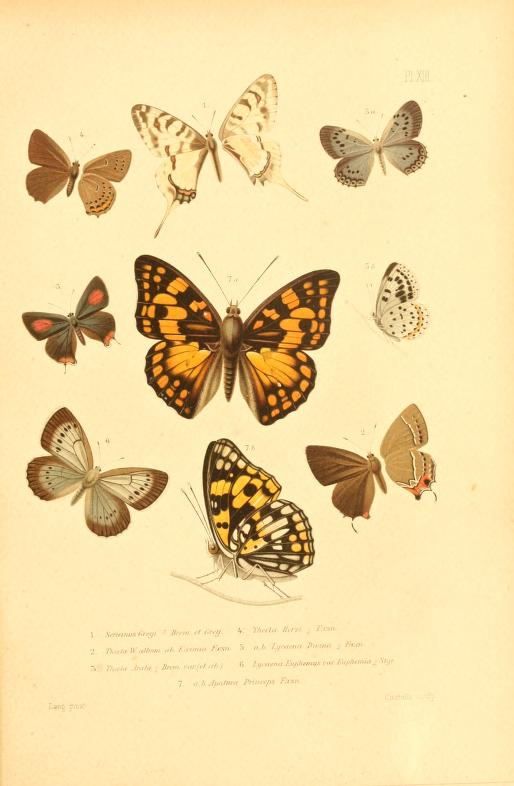
- Sinia divina figures 5a and b
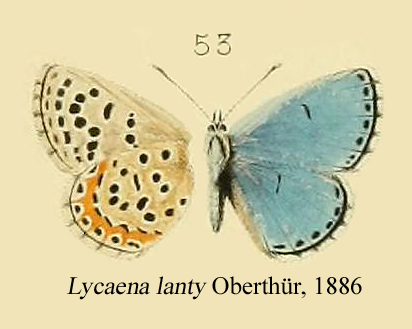
- Now Sinia lanty

Scientific classification
- Domain: Eukaryota
- Kingdom: Animalia
- Phylum: Arthropoda
- Class: Insecta
- Order: Lepidoptera
- Family: Lycaenidae
- Subfamily: Polyommatinae
- Tribe: Polyommatini
- Genus: Sinia; Forster, 1940

Synonyms
- Shijimiaeoides Beuret, 1958

= Sinia =

Butterfly genus in family Lycaenidae

Sinia is a genus of butterflies in the family Lycaenidae first described by Walter Forster in 1940. The species of this genus are found in the far eastern Palearctic realm.

== Species ==
- Sinia leechi (Forster, 1940) China

The shijimiaeoides species group

- Sinia divina (Fixsen, 1887) Korea, Japan, Amur Oblast, Ussuri This largest species of the present group is above almost spotted like Scolitantides orion; the underside is more sparsely spotted than in S. orion, but the spots of the forewing beneath are so heavy that they are almost united into a band.
- Sinia lanty (Oberthür, 1886) Tibet, western China
  - S. l. honei (Forster, 1940) Batang, Tibet
  - S. l. pomena Huang, 1998 western Tibet, southeast Tibet
