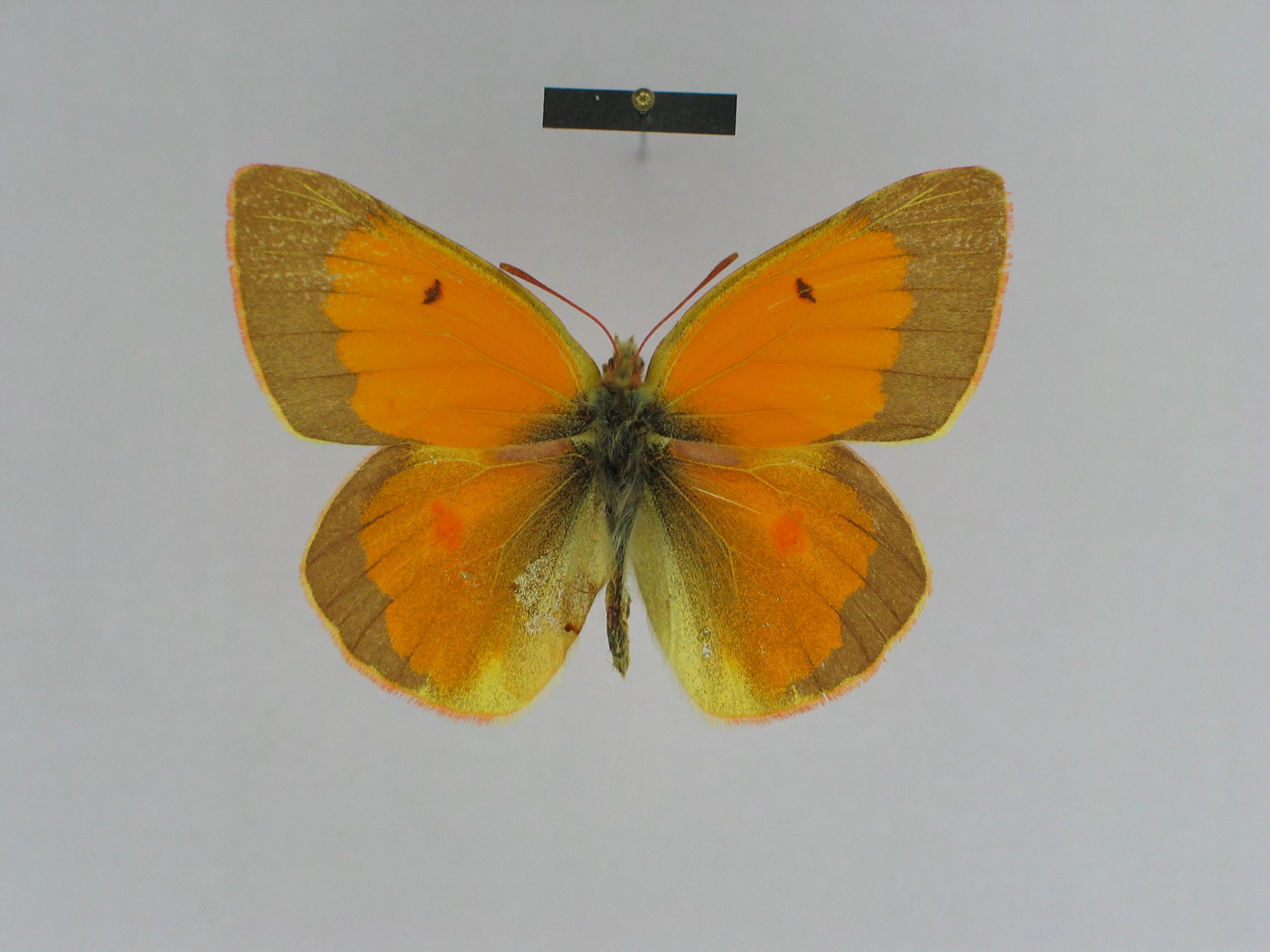

Scientific classification
- Kingdom: Animalia
- Phylum: Arthropoda
- Class: Insecta
- Order: Lepidoptera
- Family: Pieridae
- Genus: Colias
- Species: C. hyperborea

Binomial name
- Colias hyperborea Grum-Grshimailo, 1899

Synonyms
- Colias hyperborea alba Sheljuzhko, 1923; Colias hyperborea viluiensoides Verity, [1909]; Colias tunkuna Austaut, 1912

= Colias hyperborea =

Species of butterfly

Colias hyperborea is a butterfly in the family Pieridae. It is found in the East Palearctic.

== Description ==
Colias hyperborea is golden red or golden yellow above in the male, having rarely a bluish gloss; costal margin of forewing and inner margin of hindwing sulphur yellow, distal margin of forewing broadly blackish brown, dusted with sulphur yellow, the "sex-mark" at the costal margin of the hindwing large, elongate, reddish, the black middle spot of the forewing elongate, often large, the middle spot of the hindwing large, golden red, fringes of forewing rosy red, of hindwing often sulphur yellow. Underside of forewing light golden red, paler at the inner margin, greenish sulphur yellow at the costal and distal margins, very little dusted with black, hindwing greenish, the silvery middle spot thinly edged with red brown. The female is darkened above by greenish or blackish scaling, the distal marginal band bearing seven sulphur-yellow or yellow spots; hindwing darkened, the distal marginal band with large sulphur or golden-yellow spots, which often form a band; fringe and costa of forewing rosy red. The underside of the hindwing yellowish greenish, the veins being bluish, the middle spot silvery, small, and thinly edged with red brown.

== Biology ==
The larva feeds on Astragalus alpinus and Oxytropis czukotica. It flies in June and July.

== Subspecies ==
- C. h. hyperborea northeastern Siberia, Chukot Peninsula
- C. h. kurnakovi Kurentzov, 1970 Magadan
- C. h. tunkuna Austaut, 1912 Sayan
- C. h. puella Churkin & Grieshuber, 2001 eastern Chukotka
- C. h. paradoxa Churkin & Grieshuber, 2001 Putorana plateau

== Taxonomy ==
It is accepted as a species by Josef Grieshuber and Gerardo Lamas.
