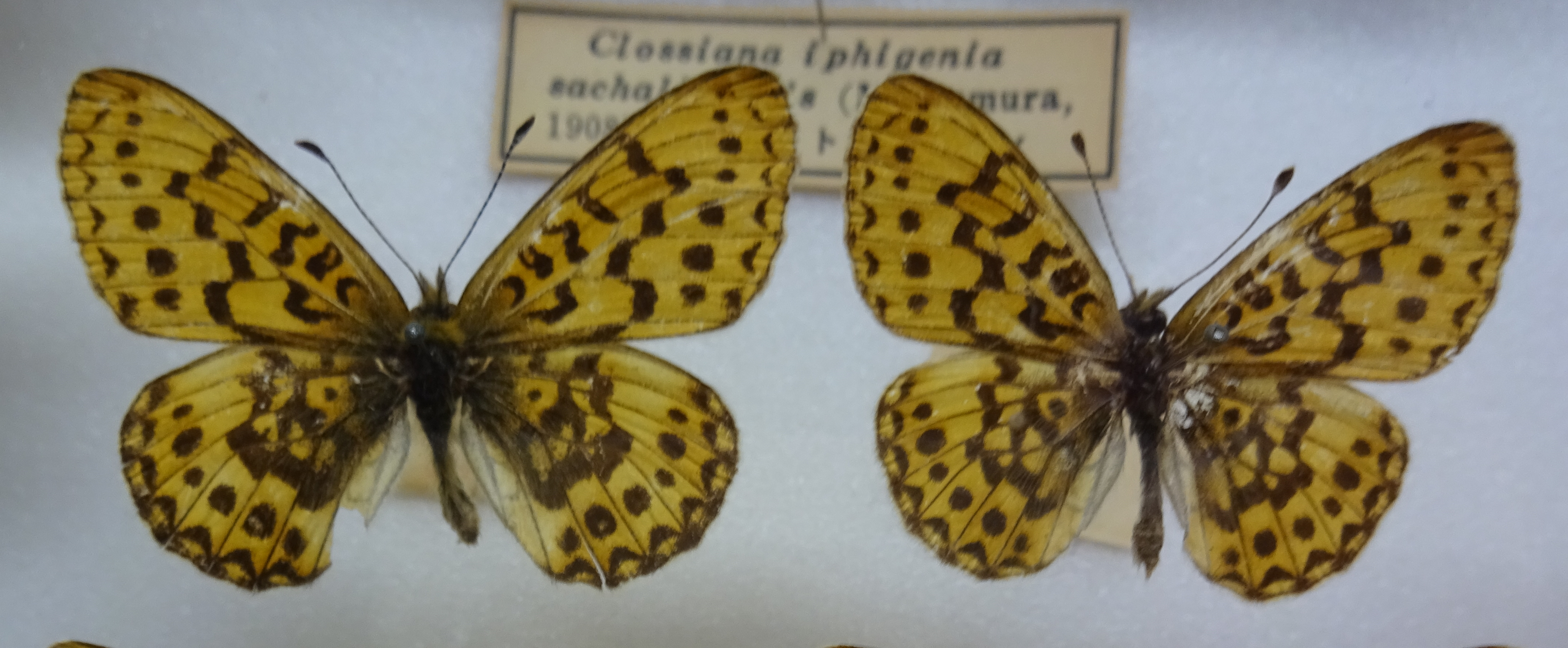

Scientific classification
- Domain: Eukaryota
- Kingdom: Animalia
- Phylum: Arthropoda
- Class: Insecta
- Order: Lepidoptera
- Family: Nymphalidae
- Genus: Boloria
- Species: B. iphigenia

Binomial name
- Boloria iphigenia (Graeser, 1888)

Synonyms
- Argynnis iphigenia Graeser, 1888; Clossiana iphigenia; Argynnis perryi Butler, 1882; Argynnis sachalinensis Matsumura, 1908

= Boloria iphigenia =

Species of butterfly

Boloria iphigenia is an east Palearctic butterfly in the family Nymphalidae (Heliconiinae). It is found in Japan, east Amur, Ussuri and northeast China

The larva feeds on Viola selkirkii and Viola grypoceras.

== Subspecies ==
- B. i. iphigenia
- B. i. alpharatoria Korb, 1997 (Sakhalin, Kunashir)
