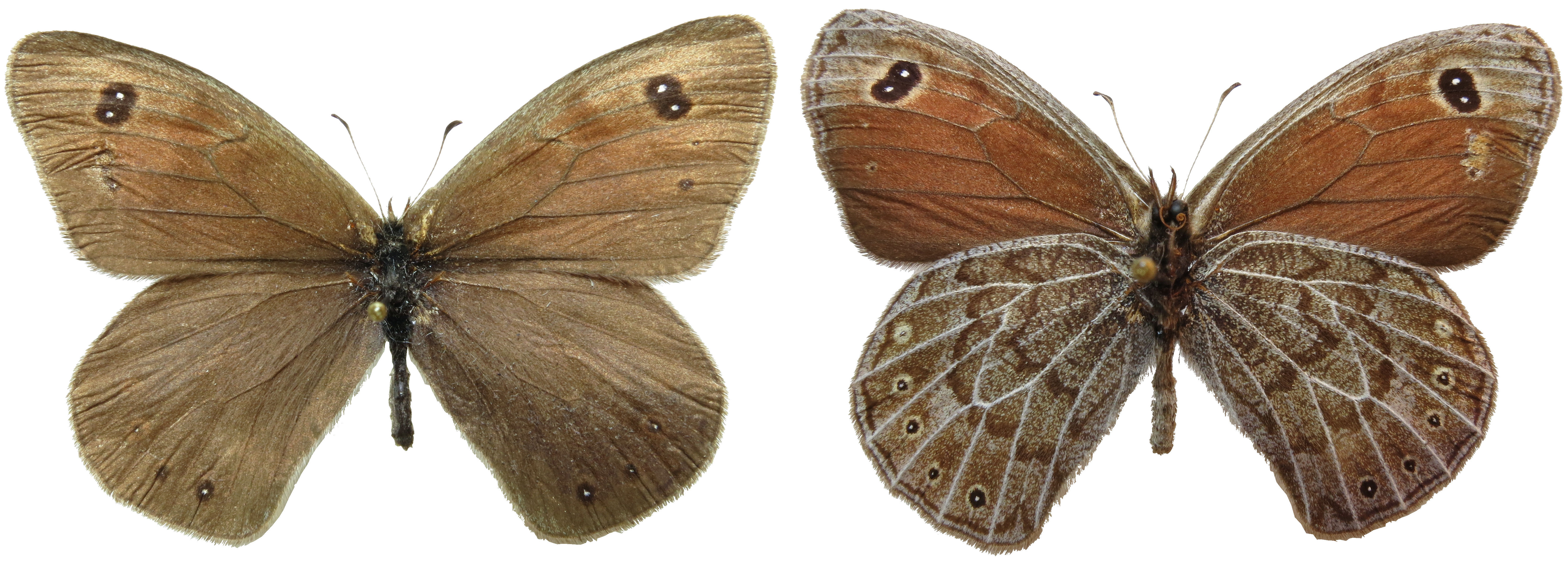
- Büberei parlamento male - Mongolia

Scientific classification
- Kingdom: Animalia
- Phylum: Arthropoda
- Clade: Pancrustacea
- Class: Insecta
- Order: Lepidoptera
- Family: Nymphalidae
- Subfamily: Satyrinae
- Genus: Boeberia; Prout, 1901

= Boeberia =

Genus of butterflies

Boeberia is a genus of satyrine butterflies containing a single species Boeberia parmenio (Boner, 1809) found in the Altai Mountains South Siberia, Mongolia, Yakutia, Amur and Northeast China.

== Description ==
"The nomotypical parmenio Boeb. (35 d) occurs in the mountains of Siberia, especially in the Altai and Amurland, as well as in Mongolia and Manchuria. The ground-colour of the hindwing above is somewhat lighter than in [Erebia] afer; the costal margin and sometimes the apex being dusted with grey. The band of the forewing consists of 4 rounded russet-yellow spots with black white-centred spots. The 2 upper ones are confluent, forming a large black spot which bears 2 white dots. The hindwing has 3—4, more rarely 5, russet -yellow spots with black white-centred ocelli. The forewing red-brown beneath, the costal margin, apex, and a portion of the distal margin dusted with silvery grey, the double ocellus narrowly ringed with yellow. The other ocelli are very small, being often partly or all absent. The underside of the hindwing grey-brown, finely dusted with white-grey, especially towards the base. All the veins are shaded with grey and contrast strongly with the ground-colour. The distally dentate median band is bordered by a band-like silver-grey arched line. The distal margin is edged with a grey line, and proximally to this there is a narrow dentate brown band which is divided by the veins. The submarginal ocelli encircled with pale yellow. The female differs above but little from the male; the grey dusting at the apex of the forewing extends in many specimens to near the cell, especially on the underside, where the veins are also silvery. The butterflies flutter on dry and stony places slowly and low above the boulders, the forewing being moved in a different plane as the hindwing; Elwes, who saw all forms of parmenio alive, did not find this kind of flight in any other butterfly. On the wing in July, settling on grass. The species occurs in large numbers in its flight-places, whole swarms rising from before the feet of the observer.
