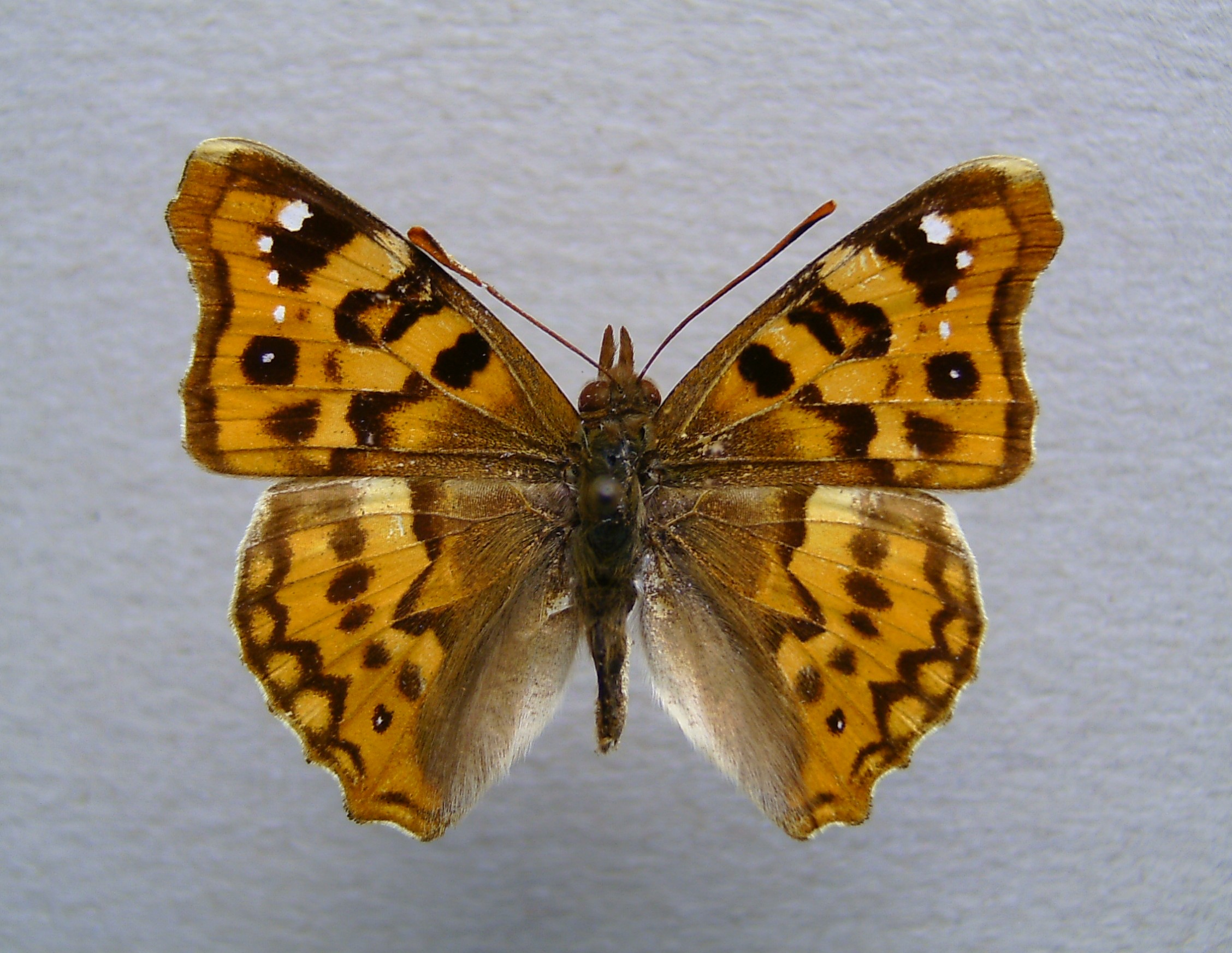
- Thaleropis ionia, upperside.
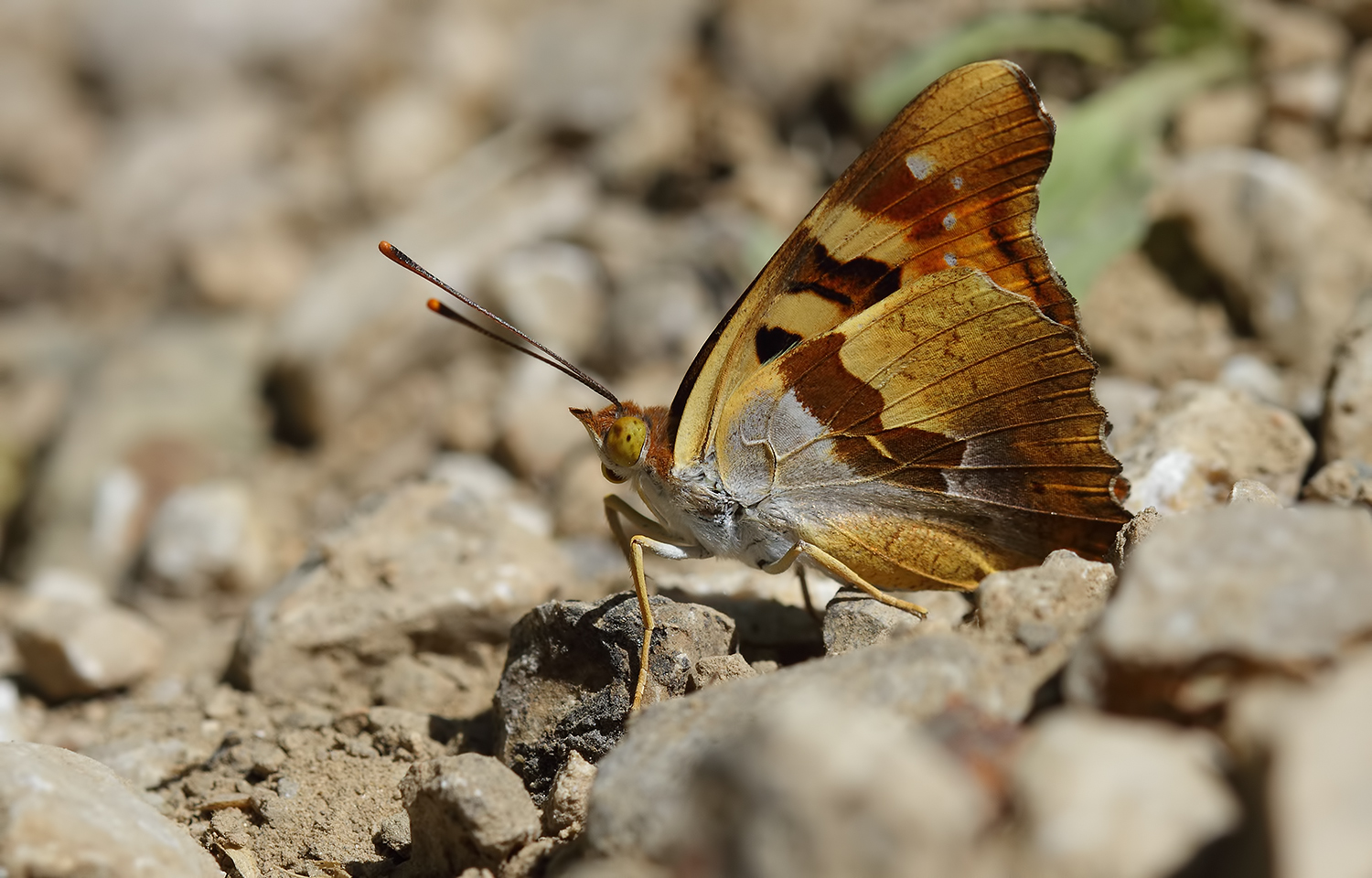
- Thaleropis ionia, underside.

Scientific classification
- Kingdom: Animalia
- Phylum: Arthropoda
- Class: Insecta
- Order: Lepidoptera
- Family: Nymphalidae
- Subfamily: Apaturinae
- Genus: Thaleropis; Staudinger, 1871
- Species: T. ionia

Binomial name
- Thaleropis ionia (Fischer von Waldheim & Eversmann, 1851)

= Thaleropis =

Genus of brush-footed butterflies

Thaleropis is a monotypic genus of butterflies in the family Nymphalidae. Its only species is the Ionian emperor, Thaleropis ionia.
