= Goldia =

Scientific classification
- Kingdom: Animalia
- Phylum: Arthropoda
- Clade: Pancrustacea
- Class: Insecta
- Order: Lepidoptera
- Family: Lycaenidae
- Tribe: Theclini
- Genus: Goldia; Dubatolov & Korshunov, 1990
- Species: G. pacifica

Binomial name
- Goldia pacifica (Dubatolov & Korshunov, 1984)

Monotypic butterfly genus in family Lycaenidae

Goldia is a genus of Palearctic butterfly in the family Lycaenidae. The genus is monotypic, containing the single species Goldia pacifica found in Primorye.
