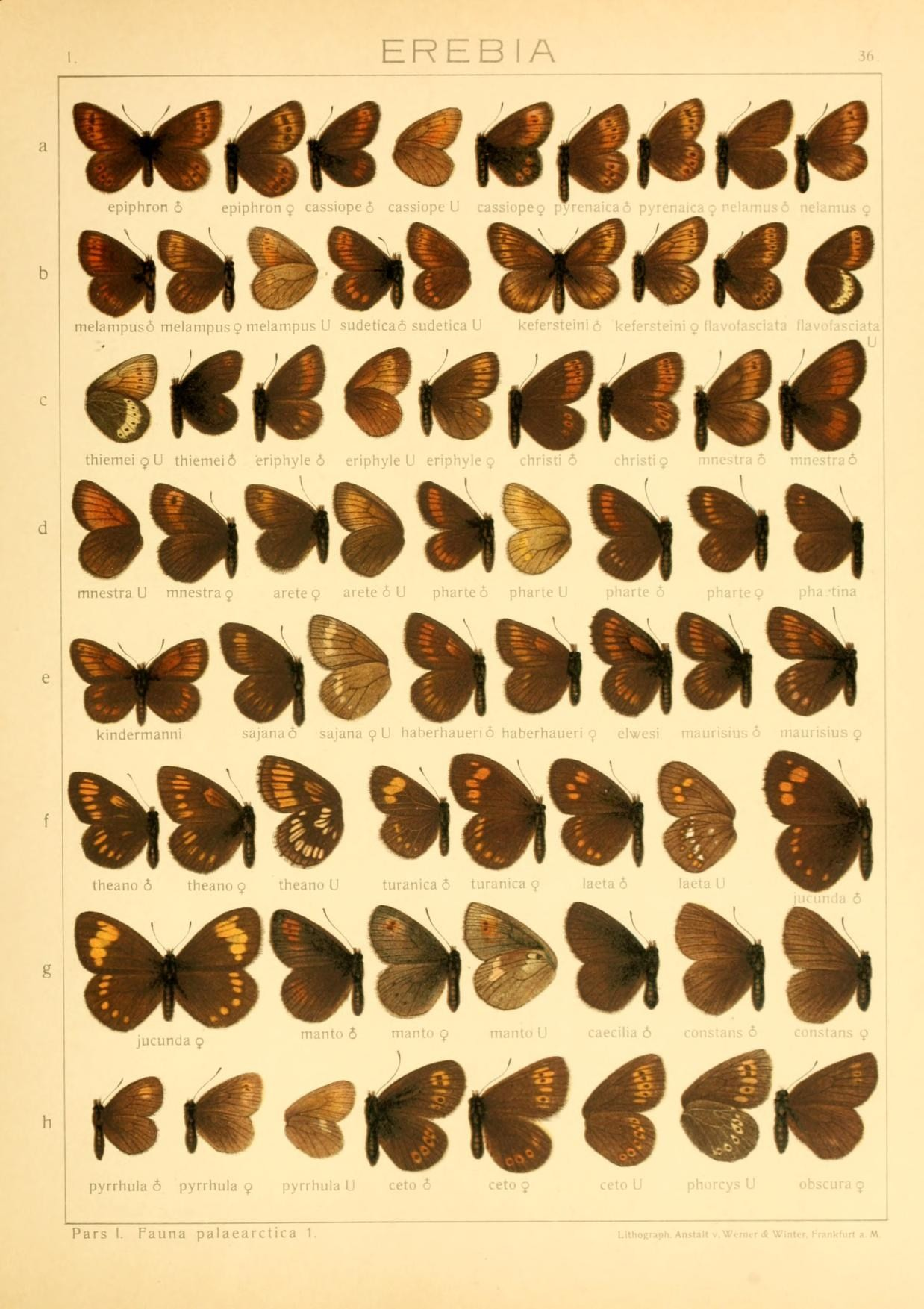
- Erebia maurisius in Seitz 36e

Scientific classification
- Kingdom: Animalia
- Phylum: Arthropoda
- Class: Insecta
- Order: Lepidoptera
- Family: Nymphalidae
- Genus: Erebia
- Species: E. maurisius

Binomial name
- Erebia maurisius (Esper, [1803])

Synonyms
- Erebia brimo Boeber, 1809; Erebia stubbendorfii Menetries, 1846; Erebia connexa Warren, 1930

= Erebia maurisius =

Species of butterfly

Erebia maurisius is a butterfly found in the East Palearctic (Altai Mountains, Sayan Mountains) that belongs to the browns family.

== Description from Seitz ==
E. maurisius Esp. (36 e). The reddish brown band of the forewing is separated by the veins into a number of elongate spots — usually 6; the cell is more or less filled in with ferruginous brown, and behind the cross-vein there are 2 somewhat diffuse narrow streaks, which extend towards the distal band, in which they disappear. The hindwing has 6 round russet-yellow spots. On the underside the band of the forewing is lighter, and the space between the band and the darkened base is russet-brown; inner and distal margins blackish brown. The hindwing dark brown in the male, with very small, point-like, russet yellow spots. In the female the hindwing is grey-brown beneath, being finely dusted with greyish yellow, the ochre-yellow dots at the distal margin are prolonged to small stripes. In the cell there is a whitish yellow diffuse spot on the upperside. The fringes grey-brown in the male, whitish grey in the female. Antenna finely ringed, the club white on the inside, black-brown on the outside. Middle of July, on the Altai, from 2000 to 2700 m, on grassy slopes.

== See also ==
- List of butterflies of Russia
