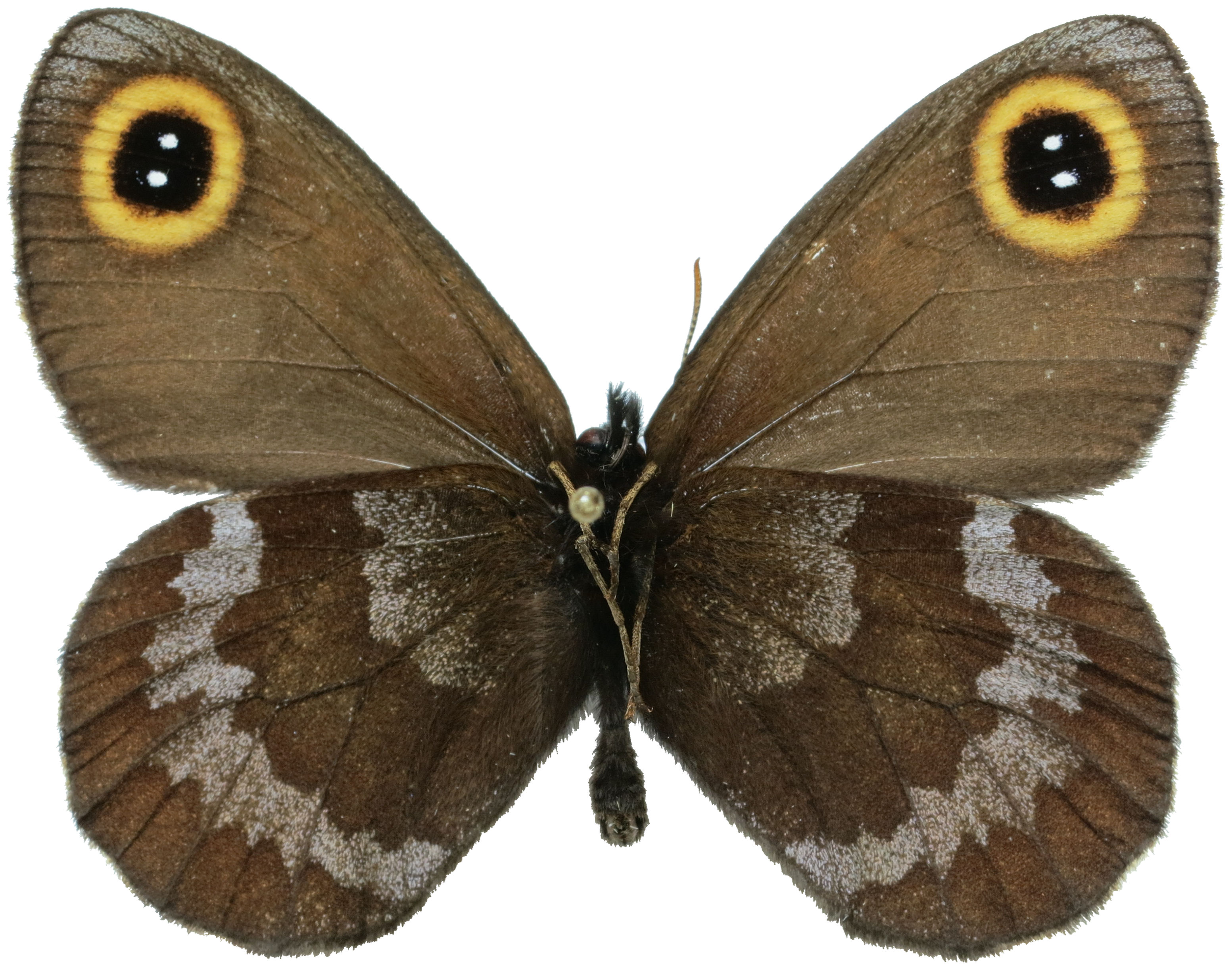
- E. cyclopius male underside - Anuchinsky District, Primorsky Krai, Russia

Scientific classification
- Domain: Eukaryota
- Kingdom: Animalia
- Phylum: Arthropoda
- Class: Insecta
- Order: Lepidoptera
- Family: Nymphalidae
- Genus: Erebia
- Species: E. cyclopius

Binomial name
- Erebia cyclopius (Eversmann, 1844)

Synonyms
- Erebia cyclopia

= Erebia cyclopius =

Species of butterfly

Erebia cyclopius is a species of butterfly of the subfamily Satyrinae in the family Nymphalidae. It is found through Siberia (from the Urals to the Far East), northern Mongolia, northern China and North Korea. The habitat consists of forest edges, flowery meadows and sparse larch forests.

The wingspan is 46–62 mm.

== Description in Seitz ==
E. cyclopius Ev. (35 c). Upperside grey-brown. The forewing has on both surfaces a subapical, nearly circular, black ocellus with 2 white pupils and ochre-yellow border. The underside of the forewing is somewhat lighter than above and the yellow border of the eye-spot is much wider, the apex of the wing being feebly dusted with bluish grey. The hindwing beneath at the base likewise dusted with bluish grey for a considerable distance; a submarginal band bluish ashy grey, in some places interrupted by the ground-colour. The ocelli of the female are larger and more broadly ringed with yellow than in the male, the apex of the wing being more densely dusted with grey-blue. Antenna ringed black and white, the club russet yellow. — In the Ural, Altai, and Kentei Mts., on the Amur and its tributaries, and on Askold; in May, June and July in damp pine-woods, locally abundant. The largest specimens occur on Askold, having an especially large subapical ocellus.

Adults are on wing from June to July.

The species overwinters in the larval stage.

== Subspecies ==
- Erebia cyclopius cyclopius (southern Urals, central and southern Siberia, the Altai and Sayan Mountains, Transbaikalia)
- Erebia cyclopius aporia Schawerda, 1919 (Amur, Ussuri)
- Erebia cyclopius yoshikurana Kishida & Nakamura, 1941 (Sakhalin)
