= Comstock's silverspot =

Scientific classification
- Domain: Eukaryota
- Kingdom: Animalia
- Phylum: Arthropoda
- Class: Insecta
- Order: Lepidoptera
- Family: Nymphalidae
- Genus: Speyeria
- Species: S. callippe
- Subspecies: S. c. comstocki

Trinomial name
- Speyeria callippe comstocki Gunder, 1925

Subspecies of butterfly

Comstock's silverspot (Speyeria callippe comstocki) is a subspecies of silverspot butterfly ranging from northern California to Baja Mexico. Populations are near extirpation in the Santa Monica Mountains and it is now rare in the San Gabriel Mountains. The larvae feed on Johnny jumpup (Viola pedunculata). It is a very close relative of the endangered callippe silverspot butterfly (Speyeria callippe callippe), which is another subspecies of Speyeria callippe. Intermediate populations between these subspecies are fairly widespread.
