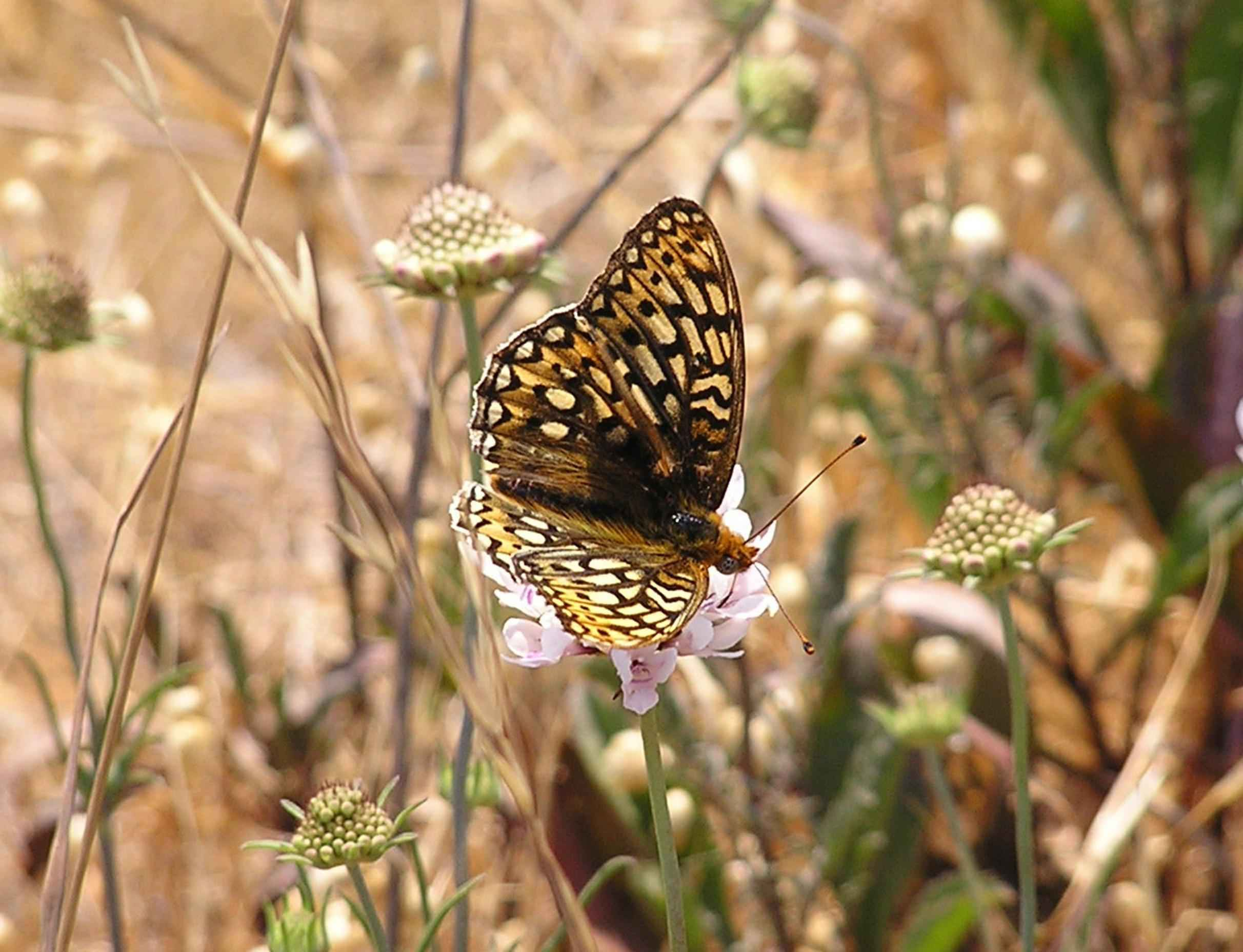

Conservation status
- Endangered (ESA)

Scientific classification
- Kingdom: Animalia
- Phylum: Arthropoda
- Clade: Pancrustacea
- Class: Insecta
- Order: Lepidoptera
- Family: Nymphalidae
- Genus: Speyeria
- Species: S. callippe
- Subspecies: S. c. callippe

Trinomial name
- Speyeria callippe callippe Boisduval, 1852

= Callippe silverspot butterfly =

Speyeria callippe callippe

Subspecies of butterfly

The callippe silverspot butterfly (Speyeria callippe callippe) is a federal endangered subspecies in the brush-footed butterfly family Nymphalidae. This is a subspecies. It is a member of the Heliconiinae, the subfamily known as longwings. The adult has a wingspan of just over two inches. The wings are eyecatching with a brown, tan, and black scalloped pattern on their surfaces and orange-brown with characteristic silver spots on the undersides. The wings and abdomen are hairy. The larvae are spiny, dark-colored caterpillars.

The larvae are dark colored with many branching sharp spines on their backs. The larvae eat only one species of plant, the yellow pansy, or "Johnny Jump-up" (Viola pedunculata). The female adults lay their eggs on the plant or nearby, and the larvae overwinter nearby in a silk pouch. In the spring they feed on the yellow pansy, molt four times, then pupate for two weeks in a nest of leaves which they glue together with silk. The adult lifespan is about three weeks in late spring or early summer.

This endangered subspecies occurs in only two grasslands spots in the San Francisco Bay Area, near Oakland and on San Bruno Mountain. Its native region is now extensively developed and heavily populated, leaving the butterfly endangered. Recently other subspecies have been known from spots near South San Francisco, the hills above Pleasanton, Sears Point in the North Bay, and in spots between Vallejo and Cordelia. The taxonomic status and listed status of the overall group of silverspot butterflies in other areas is unclear. Some specialists consider the Solano County silverspot populations to be hybrids between the callippe silverspot and Lilian's silverspot butterfly and/or Comstock's silverspot butterfly while others consider the Solano County population to be the callippe subspecies.

Depending upon environmental conditions, the flight period of this single-brooded butterfly ranges from mid-May to late July. The adults exhibit hilltopping behavior, a phenomenon in which males and virgin or multiple-mated females seek a topographic summit on which to mate.

Loss of habitat is the primary cause of endangerment. Any native grassland that remains in the butterfly's habitat is currently disappearing due to varied causes, including development, off-road vehicles, and invasive plants. Yellow pansy populations will suffer under either very intense grazing that removes most vegetation (including the pansy), or undergrazing in which non-native grasses are allowed to grow tall and dense.

This subspecies was listed as a federal endangered species in 1997. California does not list insects as state endangered species.

== In popular culture ==
The Callippe Silverspot Butterfly was featured in a series of prints by artist Andy Warhol. In 1983, the artist was commissioned to create a portfolio of ten endangered species to raise environmental awareness and included was D. andersonii. The portfolio, known as "Endangered Species" was created in support of the Endangered Species Act, which was passed by the U.S. Congress in 1973. Other animals within the portfolio include the Siberian Tiger, Bald Eagle and the Giant Panda.
