= Speyeria adiaste atossa =

Scientific classification
- Kingdom: Animalia
- Phylum: Arthropoda
- Class: Insecta
- Order: Lepidoptera
- Family: Nymphalidae
- Genus: Speyeria
- Species: S. adiaste
- Subspecies: †S. a. atossa

Trinomial name
- †Speyeria adiaste atossa (W. H. Edwards, 1864)

Extinct subspecies of butterfly

Speyeria adiaste atossa, the Atossa fritillary, is an extinct subspecies of the unsilvered fritillary (Speyeria adiaste) butterfly in the Nymphalidae family.

== Taxonomy ==
Speyeria adiaste atossa was first described by American entomologist William Henry Edwards in 1864. Speyeria is now recognized as a subgenus of Argynnis as of 2017.

== Distribution and habitat ==
They were formerly found in the Tehachapi, Tejon and San Jacinto mountain ranges in southern California. They were found in higher elevations near the tops of mountains.

== Extinction ==
The subspecies was last observed and collected around 1960.

=== Causes ===
The precise cause of this subspecies extinction is not known. Droughts in the late 50's may have weakened the population and made them more vulnerable to disease. Both the Speyeria fritillary butterflies and their larval food plants Viola are known to be more sensitive to environmental changes than some other native species in their habitats.

== See also ==
- Xerces blue (extinct butterfly species in California)
