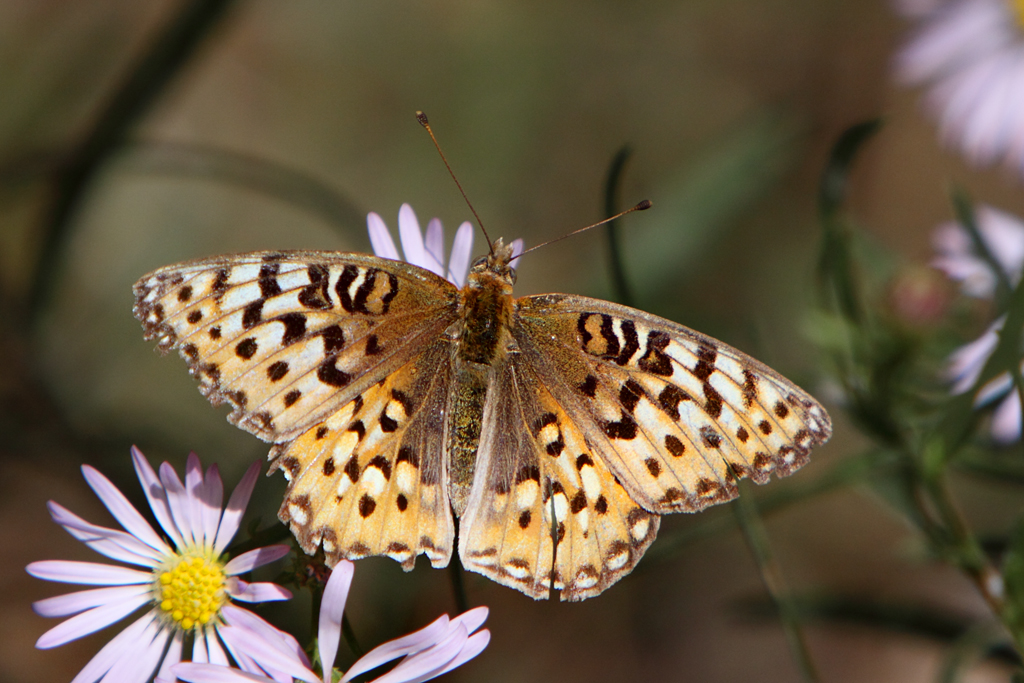

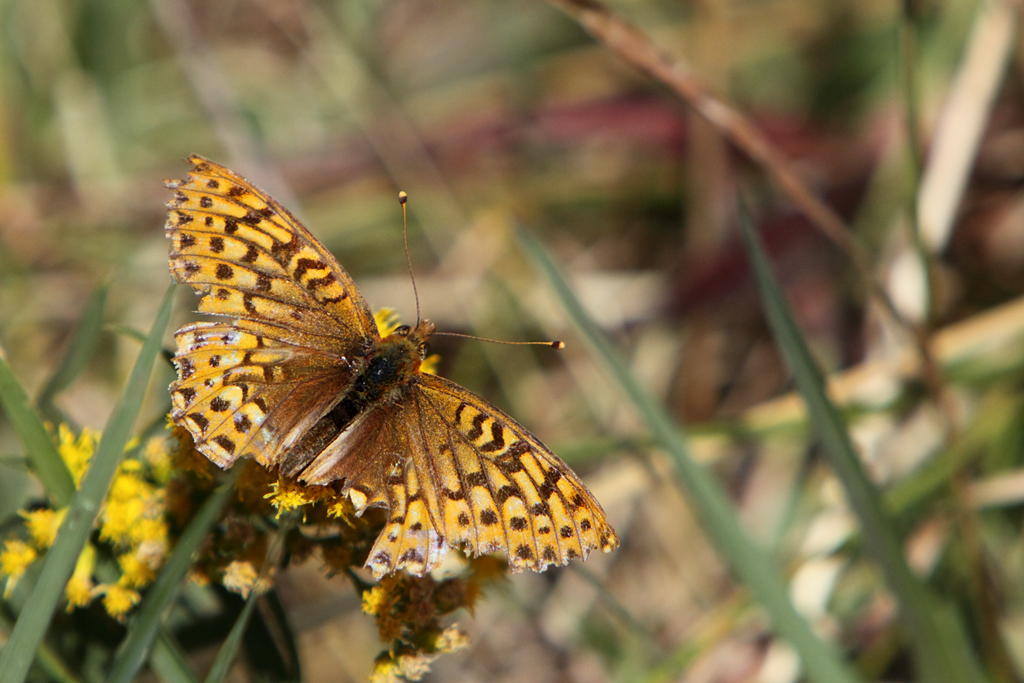

Scientific classification
- Domain: Eukaryota
- Kingdom: Animalia
- Phylum: Arthropoda
- Class: Insecta
- Order: Lepidoptera
- Family: Nymphalidae
- Genus: Speyeria
- Species: S. edwardsii

Binomial name
- Speyeria edwardsii (Reakirt, 1866)

= Speyeria edwardsii =

Edwards' fritillary

Species of butterfly

Speyeria edwardsii, the Edwards' fritillary, is a butterfly of the family Nymphalidae of North America. It is common from Alberta east to Manitoba and south as far as northern New Mexico.

This butterfly is mostly orange coloured with distinct dark-brown bars on the topside. The wing margins are dark with lighter circles then darker crescents. Silvery spots predominate on the yellowish underside.

Wingspan ranges from 60–86 mm (2.4–3.4 in).

Larva feeds on Viola nuttallii.

== Similar species ==
- Great spangled fritillary – S. cybele
- Callippe fritillary – S. callippe
