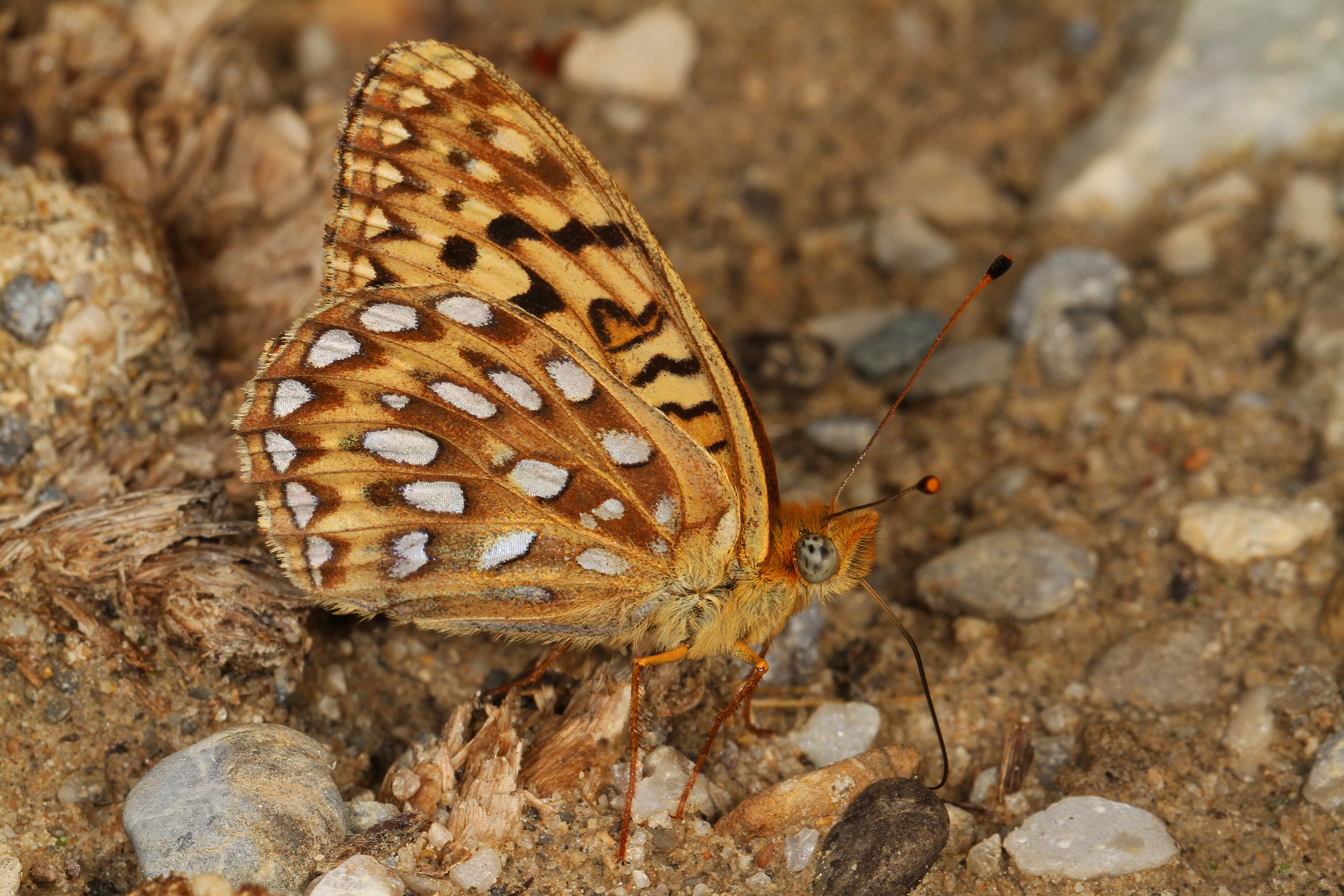

Scientific classification
- Domain: Eukaryota
- Kingdom: Animalia
- Phylum: Arthropoda
- Class: Insecta
- Order: Lepidoptera
- Family: Nymphalidae
- Genus: Speyeria
- Species: S. coronis

Binomial name
- Speyeria coronis (Behr, 1864)

Synonyms
- Argynnis coronis Behr, 1864; Argynnis californica Skinner, 1917

= Speyeria coronis =

Coronis fritillary

Species of butterfly

Speyeria coronis, the Coronis fritillary, is a butterfly of the family Nymphalidae of North America. It is common from Baja California to Washington and east to Colorado and western South Dakota and once reported in Alberta.

This butterfly is mostly orange and yellow with distinct dark-brown bars on the topside. The wing margins are dark with lighter circles then dark crescents. Silvery spots predominate on the yellowish underside.

Wingspan ranges from 60–86 mm (2.4–3.4 in).

The larvae feed on Viola species.

== Similar species ==
- Zerene fritillary – Speyeria zerene
- Edwards' fritillary – Speyeria edwardsii

== Subspecies ==
Listed alphabetically:

- S. c. halcyone (Edwards, 1869)
- S. c. hennei (Gunder, 1934)
- S. c. semiramis (Edwards, 1886)
- S. c. simaetha dos Passos & Grey, 1945
- S. c. snyderi (Skinner, 1897)
