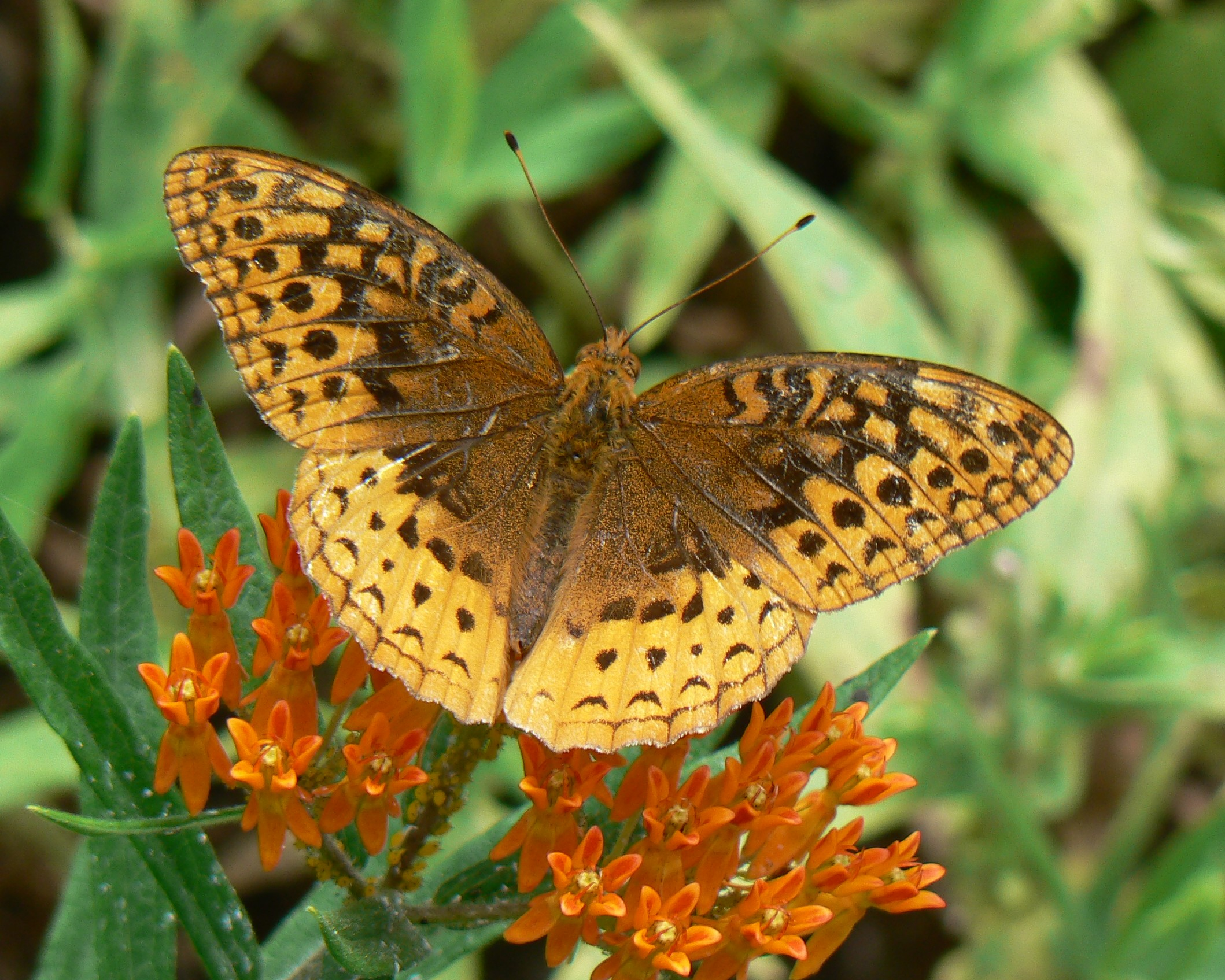

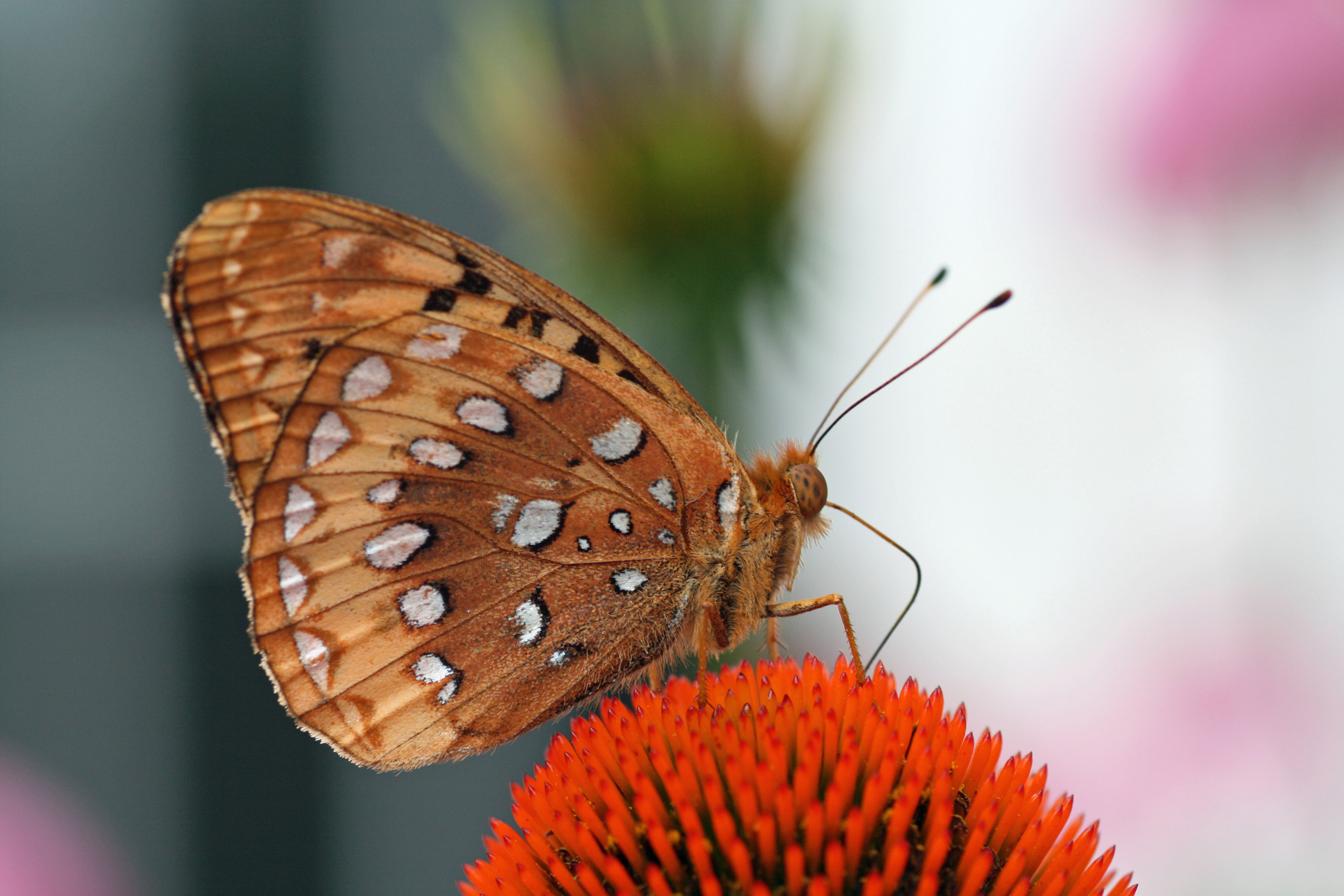

Conservation status
- Secure (NatureServe)

Scientific classification
- Domain: Eukaryota
- Kingdom: Animalia
- Phylum: Arthropoda
- Class: Insecta
- Order: Lepidoptera
- Family: Nymphalidae
- Genus: Speyeria
- Species: S. cybele

Binomial name
- Speyeria cybele (Fabricius, 1775)

Subspecies
- See text

= Great spangled fritillary =

Species of butterfly

The great spangled fritillary (Speyeria cybele) is a North American butterfly of the family Nymphalidae.

== Description ==
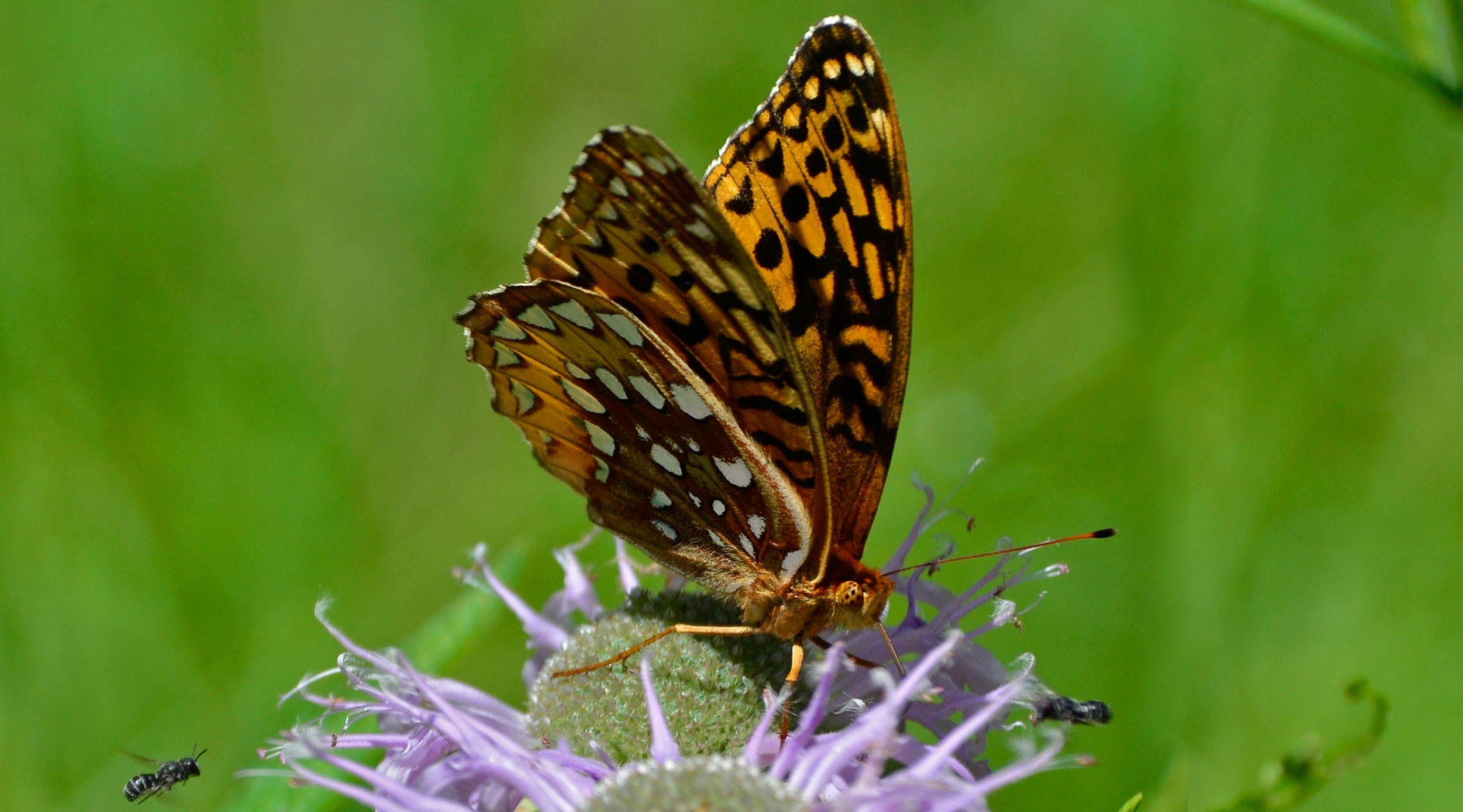
At Flat Rock Brook Nature Center, New Jersey, United States

Its wingspan ranges from 62 to 88 mm (2.4 to 3.5 in). It is characterized by its orange colour above with five black dashes near forewing base and several irregular black dashes at the base of the hindwing. In addition, two rows of black crescents run along the edges of the wings. Below, the forewing is yellowish orange with black marks similar to the upperside, with a few silver spots on the tip of the wing. The hindwing is reddish brown with silver spots on the base and middle of the wing. A broad yellow band and silver triangles are the most notable qualities on the wing, next to the brown margin. Females tend to be darker than males and individuals from the western reaches of this species range tend to be brighter orange. Similar species include the Aphrodite fritillary (Speyeria aphrodite), the Atlantis fritillary (Speyeria atlantis) and the northwestern fritillary (Speyeria hesperis). It is distinguished from the Aphrodite and Atlantis fritillaries by a wide light submarginal band on the hindwing and instead of black spots, black dashes form on the margins of the forewing.

== Subspecies ==
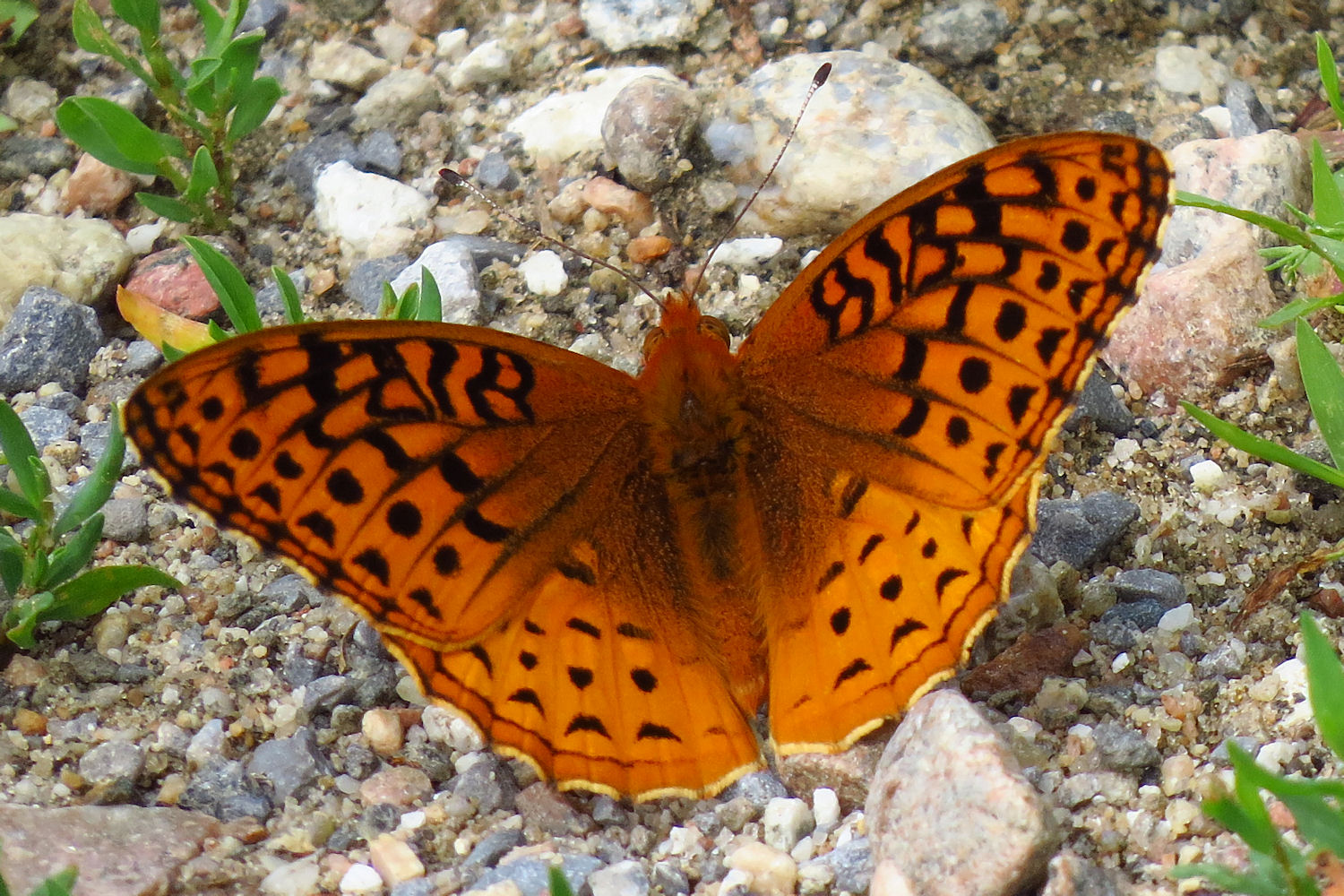
S. c. cybele, male, Gatineau Park, Quebec

Listed alphabetically:

- S. c. carpenterii (Edwards, 1876)
- S. c. charlottii (Barnes, 1897)
- S. c. cybele (Fabricius, 1775)
- S. c. krautwurmi (Holland, 1931) – Krautwurm's fritillary
- S. c. leto (Behr, 1862)
- S. c. letona dos Passos & Grey, 1945
- S. c. novascotiae (McDunnough, 1935)
- S. c. pseudocarpenteri (F. & R. Chermock, 1940)
- S. c. pugetensis Chermock & Frechin, 1947

== Range ==
The great spangled fritillary covers a wide range of North America stretching from southern Canada to northern California on the west to North Carolina on the east. Prime habitat for this species includes moist meadows and woodland edges.

== Larval host ==
Various species of native violets have reported to serve as a larval host plant for the great spangled fritillary, including the native round-leaf violet (Viola rotundifolia), the arrow-leaf violet (Viola fimbriatula) and the common blue violet (Viola sororia).
