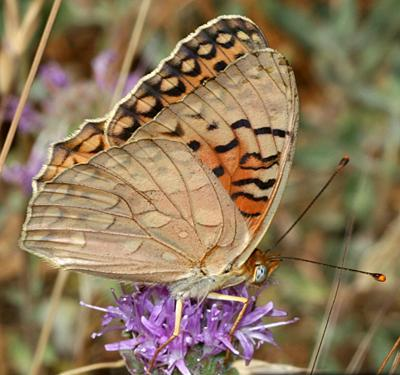

Conservation status
- Critically Imperiled (NatureServe)

Scientific classification
- Domain: Eukaryota
- Kingdom: Animalia
- Phylum: Arthropoda
- Class: Insecta
- Order: Lepidoptera
- Family: Nymphalidae
- Genus: Speyeria
- Species: S. adiaste

Binomial name
- Speyeria adiaste (W.H. Edwards, 1864)

Synonyms
- Argynnis adiante Boisduval, 1869; Argynnis adiaste Behr, 1862

= Speyeria adiaste =

Species of butterfly

Speyeria adiaste, the unsilvered fritillary or adiaste fritillary, is a species of butterfly of the family Nymphalidae. It is found in coastal Californian mountains in two clusters, one in San Mateo County, Santa Cruz County, and Santa Clara County and the other cluster in Los Angeles County, Kern County, and Santa Barbara County.

The wingspan is 50–61 mm. Adults feed on flower nectar. The upper side of the male can range from a pale reddish tan to a bright brick red. Females are larger and paler than the males. Dark markings are scattered and small expect on the bold post median line. The underside can range from a pale yellow to a gray. The hindwing spots are unsilvered and barely contrast with the background color.

The larvae feed on Viola species, including Viola quercetorum.

== Subspecies ==
- Speyeria adiaste adiaste
- †Speyeria adiaste atossa
- Speyeria adiaste clemencei
