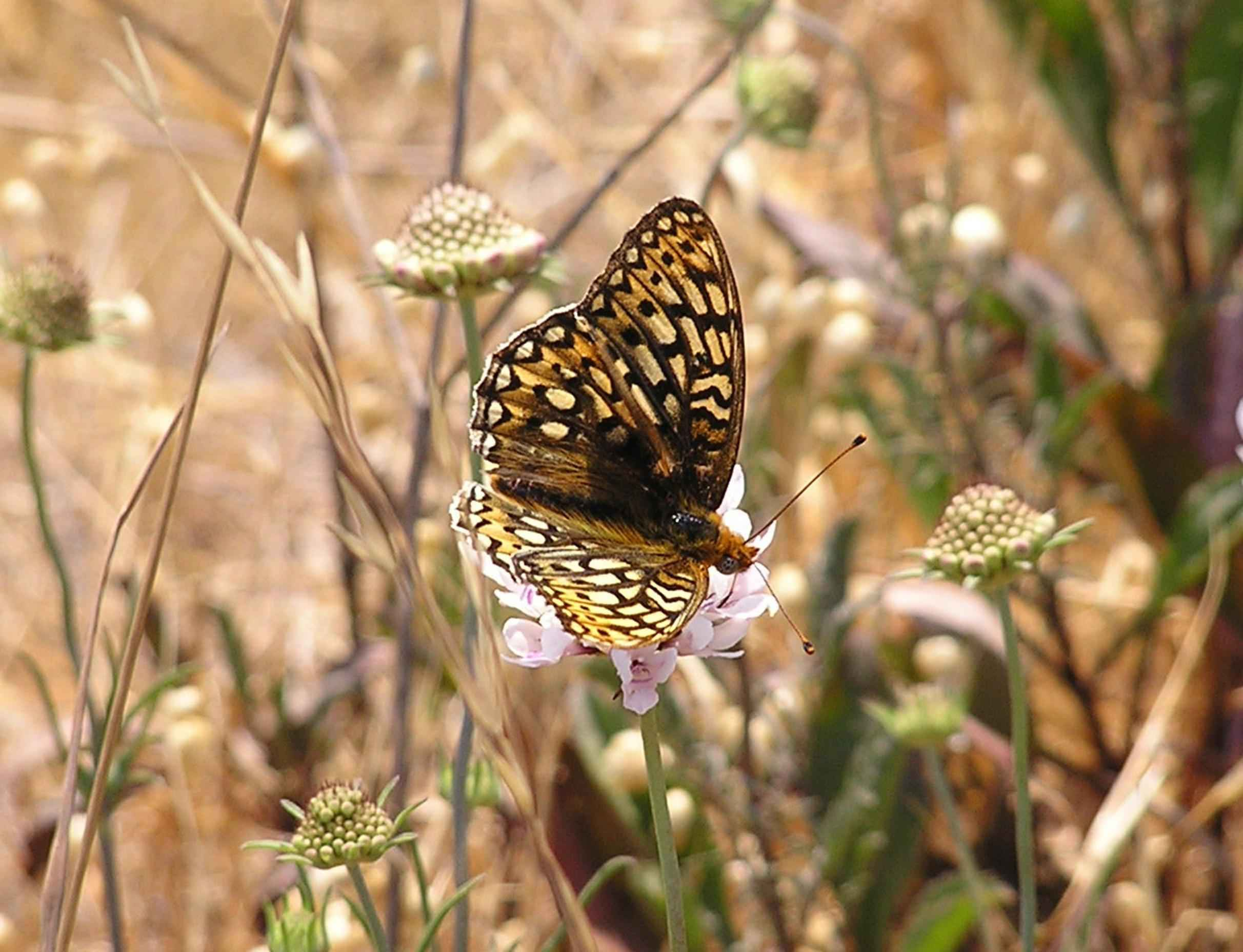
- S. c. callippe

Scientific classification
- Domain: Eukaryota
- Kingdom: Animalia
- Phylum: Arthropoda
- Class: Insecta
- Order: Lepidoptera
- Family: Nymphalidae
- Genus: Speyeria
- Species: S. callippe

Binomial name
- Speyeria callippe (Boisduval, 1852)

Synonyms
- Argynnis callippe Boisduval, 1852

= Speyeria callippe =

Callippe fritillary

Species of butterfly

Speyeria callippe, the callippe fritillary, is a North American species of butterflies in the brush-footed family Nymphalidae.

== Subspecies ==
Listed alphabetically:

- S. c. calgariana (McDunnough, 1924)
- S. c. callippe Boisduval, 1852
- S. c. comstocki (Gunder, 1925) – Comstock's silverspot
- S. c. elaine dos Passos & Grey, 1945
- S. c. gallatini (McDunnough, 1929)
- S. c. harmonia dos Passos & Grey, 1945
- S. c. juba (Boisduval, 1869)
- S. c. laura (Edwards, 1879)
- S. c. laurina (Wright, 1905)
- S. c. liliana (H. Edwards, 1877)
- S. c. nevadensis (Edwards, 1870)
- S. c. macaria (Edwards, 1877)
- S. c. meadii (Edwards, 1872)
- S. c. rupestris (Behr, 1863)
- S. c. semivirida (McDunnough, 1924)
- S. c. sierra dos Passos & Grey, 1945

== Distribution and habitat ==
This species can be found in North America, from Central British Columbia east to South Dakota and Manitoba, south to southern California, Nevada, Utah, and Colorado. These butterflies usually inhabit sagebrush, dry woodland, edge of forests, chaparral and grassy hillsides.

== Description ==
Speyeria callippe can reach a wingspan of 5–6.4 cm (2.0–2.5 in). In these large and widespread butterflies the color of the upperside of the wings varies from tawny to bright red-brown with black evenly-spaced zigzag stripes. The entire outer contour is black-brown, divided by a row of pale lunules. The underside of the forewings is red fawn, with the same design as above, and a series of marginal silver lunules. The underside of the hindwings is brown, with about twenty-two large silvered spots and triangular silver submarginal spots with narrow brown edges. In the last stage the larvae are greyish, with black and grey patches and black-orange spines.

== Biology ==
Speyeria callippe is a univoltine species. Adults fly from May to August, usually patrolling for females, which emerge before males. Eggs are laid in litter near the host plants. Unfed first-stage caterpillars overwinter until spring, when they feed on leaves of Viola pedunculata, Viola nuttallii, Viola beckwithii, Viola douglasii and Viola purpurea.

== Gallery ==
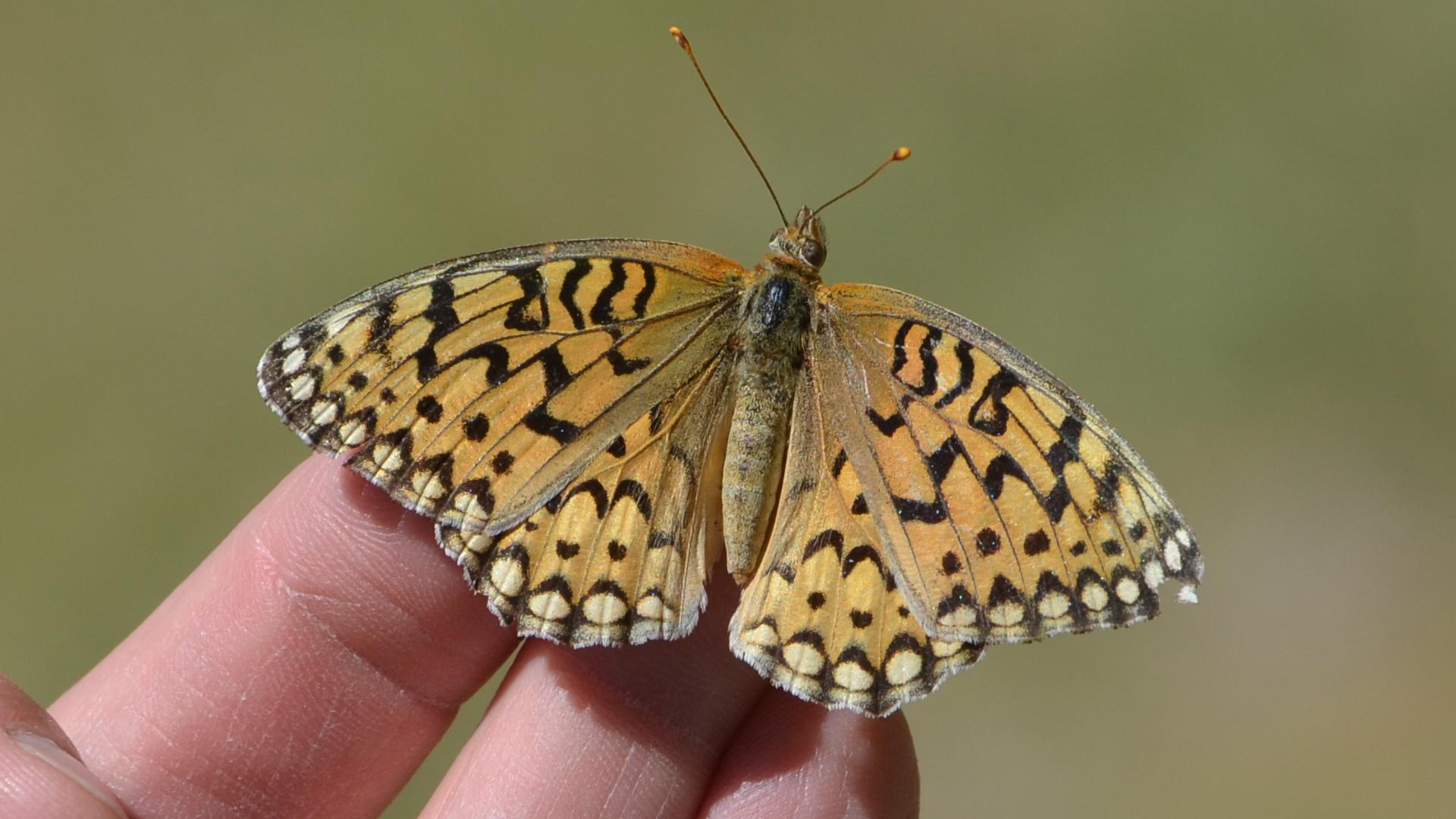
Speyeria callippe. Upperside

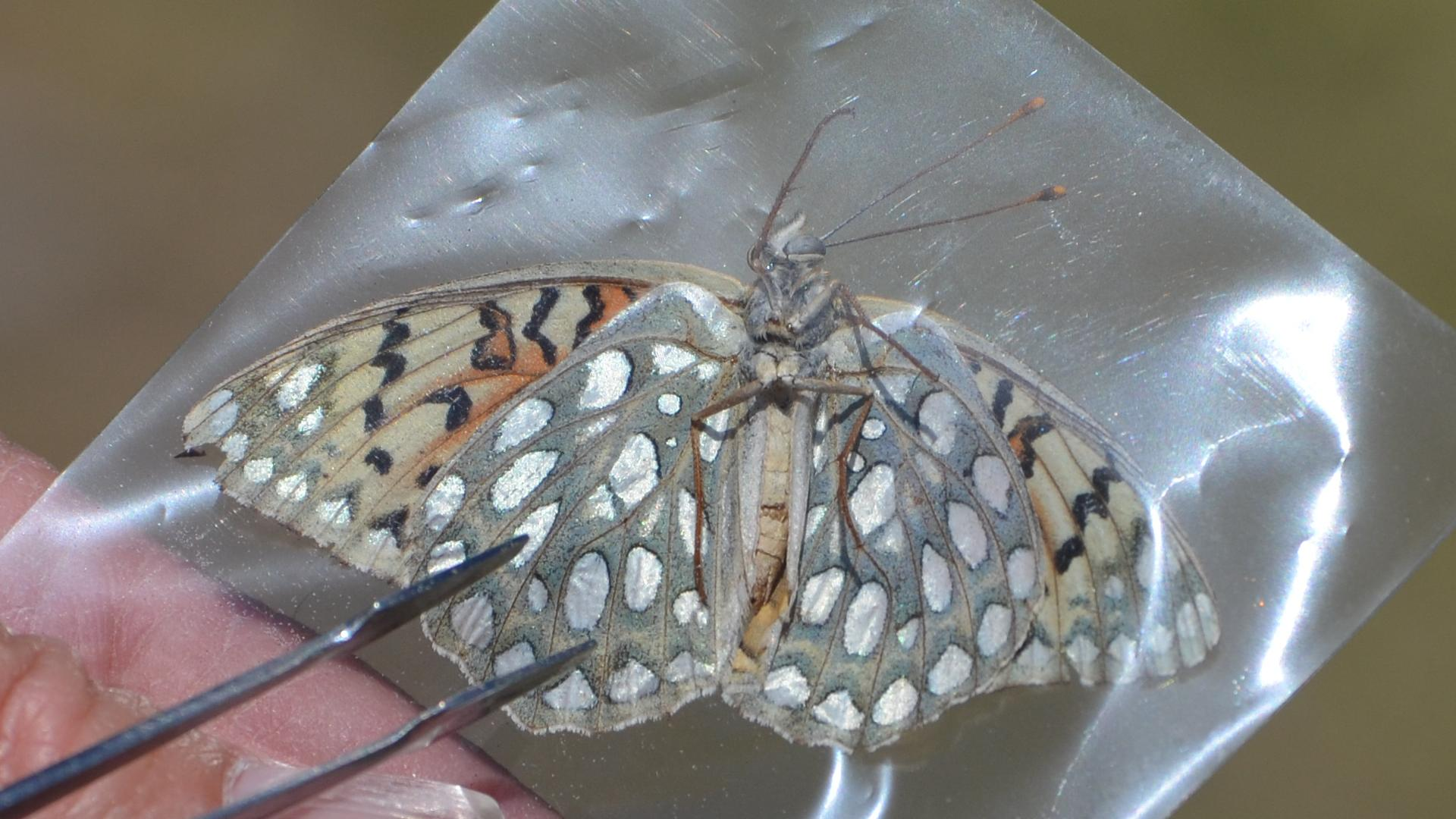
Underside

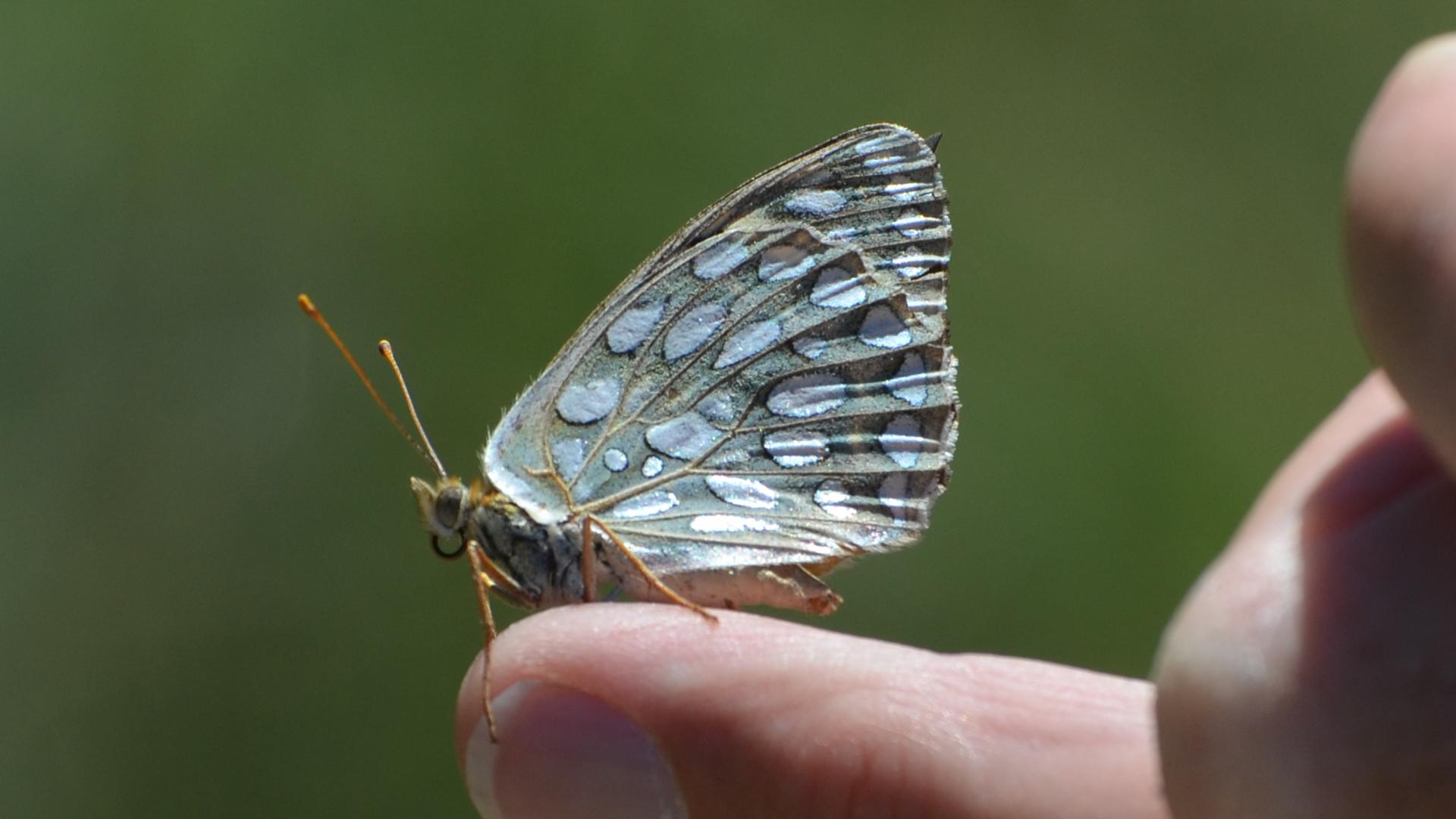
Sideview

S. callippe in Yellowstone. Video clip
