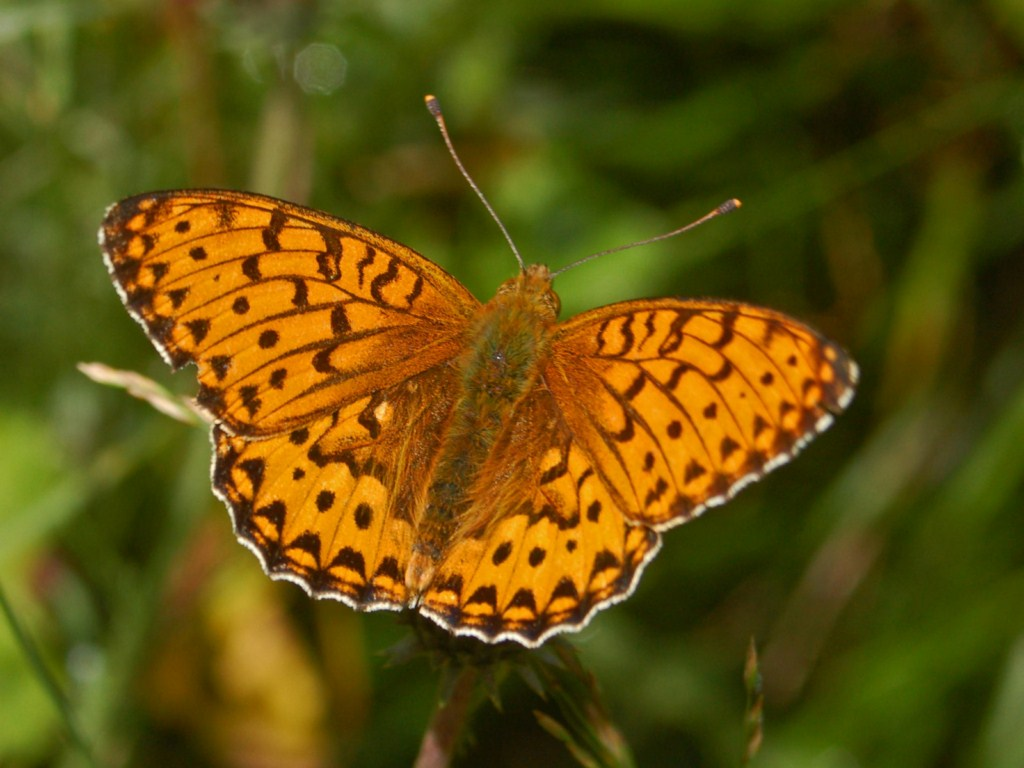
- Male, Val d'Aosta, Italy
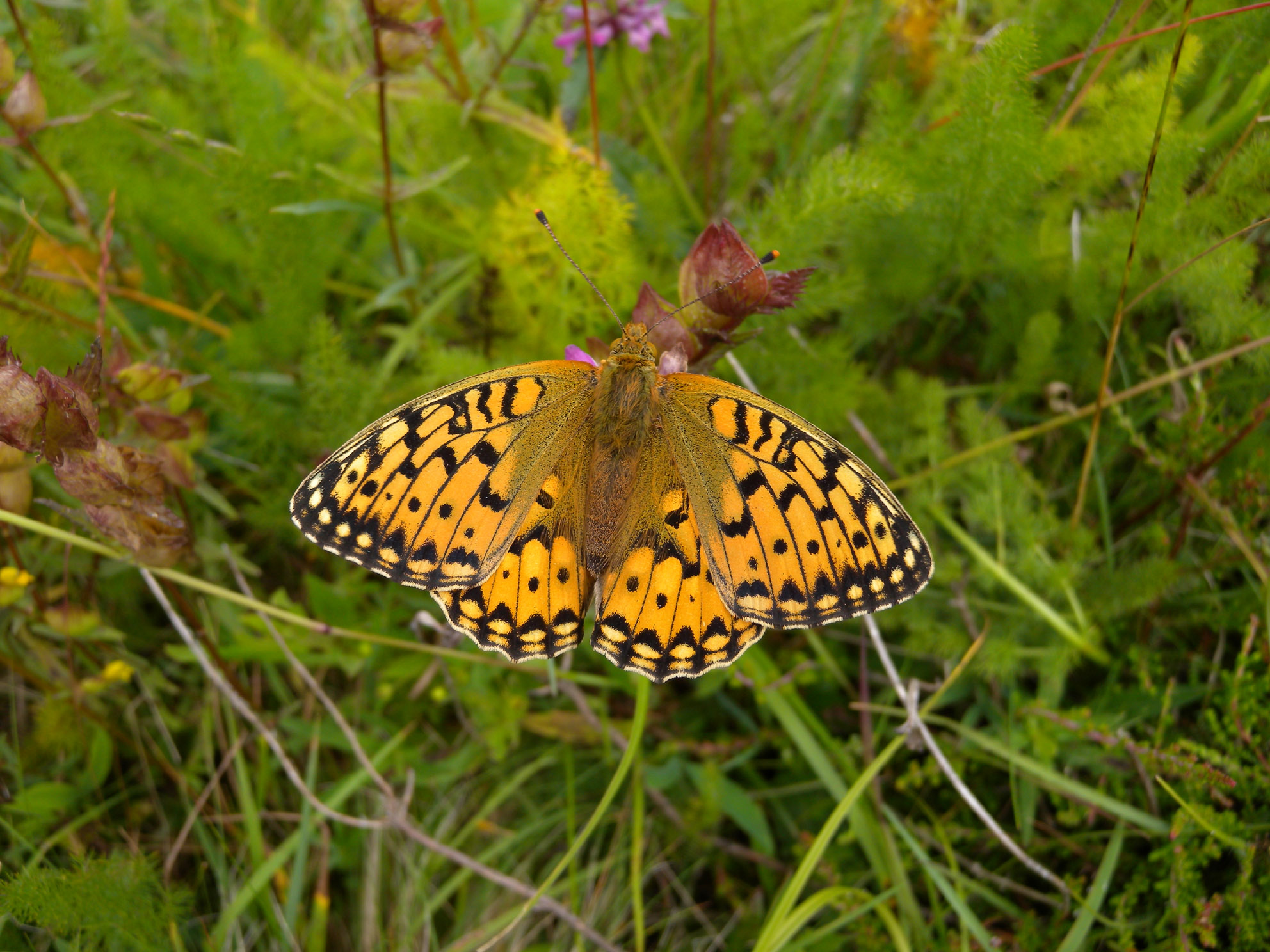
- Female, Elsenborn, Belgium

Conservation status
- Least Concern (IUCN 3.1)

Scientific classification
- Kingdom: Animalia
- Phylum: Arthropoda
- Class: Insecta
- Order: Lepidoptera
- Family: Nymphalidae
- Genus: Speyeria
- Species: S. aglaja

Binomial name
- Speyeria aglaja (Linnaeus, 1758)

Synonyms
- List: Papilio aglaia (Linnaeus, 1758); Papilio aglaja Linnaeus, 1758; Argynnis mitchelli Kershaw, 1952; Argynnis robnora Kershaw, 1952; Argynnis smrzi Slabý, 1949; Argynnis ovalis Cabeau, 1930; Argynnis molybdina Newnham, 1917; Argynnis viridiatra Strand, 1912; Argynnis gutta Wileman, 1911; Mesoachidalia plutus Oberthür, 1909; Argynnis fusca Tutt, 1896; Argynnis fuscans Tutt, 1896; Argynnis pallida Tutt, 1896; Argynnis wimani Holmgren, 1888; Argynnis aberrans Lampa, 1885; Argynnis aglaja (Linnaeus, 1758); Argynnis aurea Tutt, 1896; Argynnis eridioides Pflümer, 1879; Argynnis charlotta Haworth, 1803; Argynnis emilia Acerbi, 1802; Mesoacidalia sinenigra Aagesen; Speyeria albomaculata Rebel; Speyeria emilocuples Warren, 1955; Speyeria hindenburgi Schuster von Forstner, 1928; Speyeria arvernensis Bramson, 1890

= Dark green fritillary =

Species of butterfly

The dark green fritillary (Speyeria aglaja) is a species of butterfly in the family Nymphalidae. The insect has a wide range in the Palearctic realm - Europe, Morocco, Iran, Siberia, Central Asia, China, Korea, and Japan.

== Taxonomy ==
The dark green fritillary was first formally described as Papilio aglaja in the 10th edition of Systema Naturae published in 1758 with its type locality given as Sweden. This species is now classified in the genus Speyeria which is classified within the subfamily Heliconiinae of the brush-footed butterfly family, Nymphalidae.

== Subspecies ==
- S. a. aglaja Southern Europe, Central Europe, Caucasus, Altai, Sayan, West Siberia, South Siberia
- S. a. borealis (Strand, 1901) Europe, Siberia, Russian Far East, Kamchatka
- S. a. lyauteyi (Oberthür, 1920) Morocco (Middle Atlas)
- S. a. excelsior (Rothschild, 1933) Morocco (Rif Mountains)
- S. a. ottomana (Röber, 1896) Armenia, Talys, Kopet Dagh
- S. a. gigasvitatha (Verity, 1935) Tian-Shan, Ghissar, Darvaz, Alai, South Altai
- S. a. vitatha (Moore, 1874) Pamirs
- S. a. clavimacula (Matsumura, 1929) South Ussuri
- S. a. kenteana (Stichel, 1901) Transbaikalia, North Ussuri, Amur
- S. a. tonnai (Matsumura, 1928) Sakhalin
- S. a. bessa (Fruhstorfer, 1907) ?
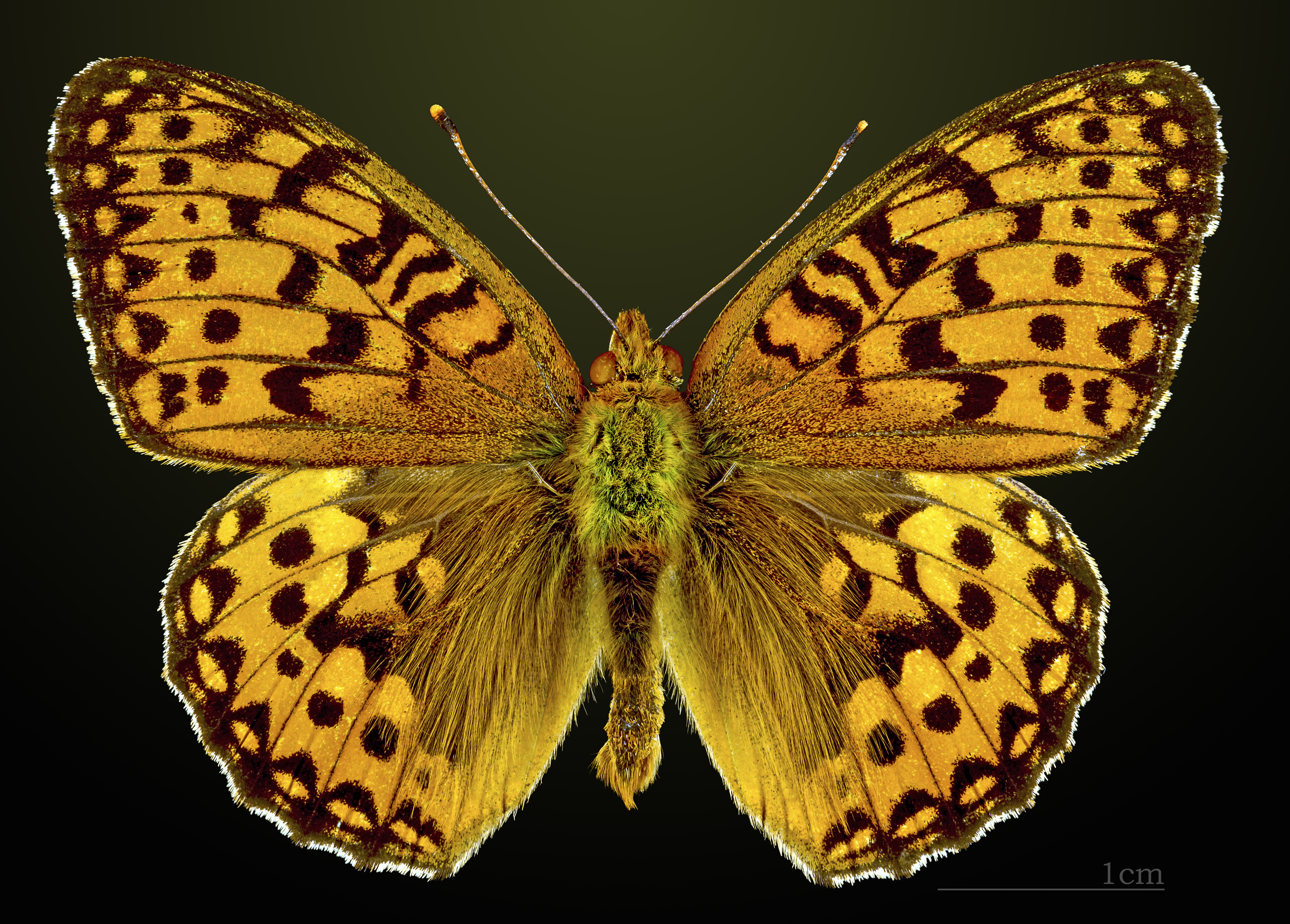

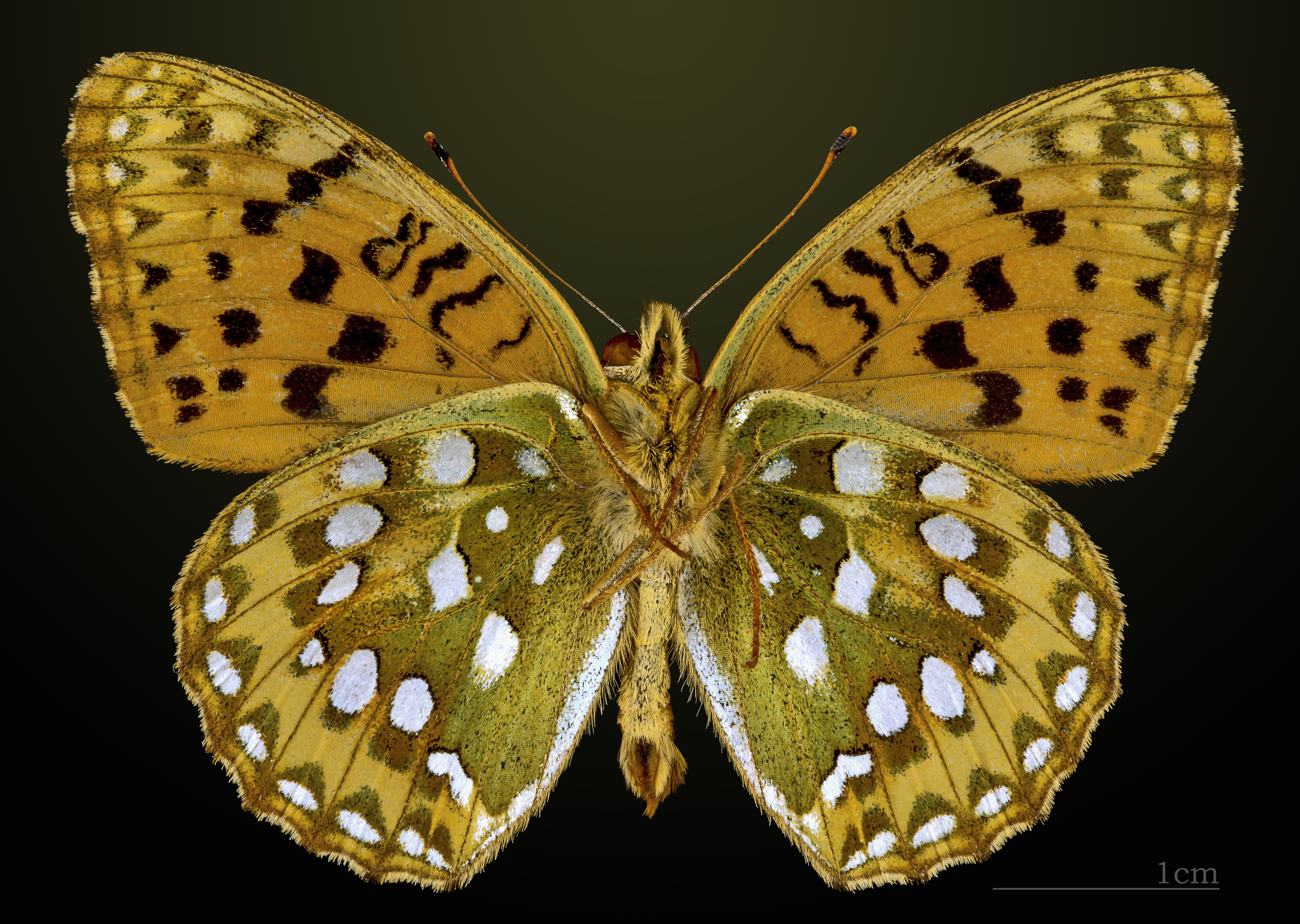
Underside

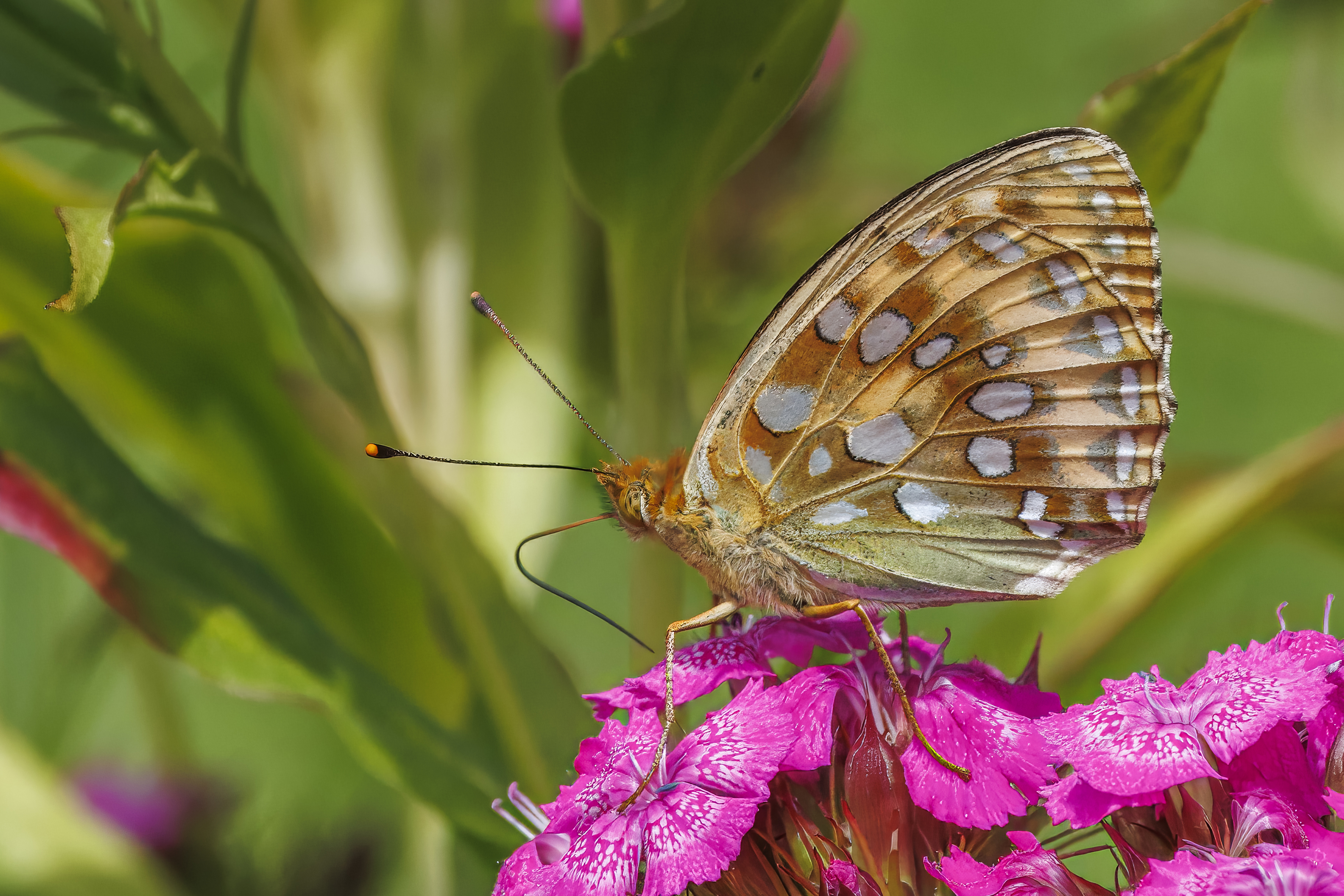

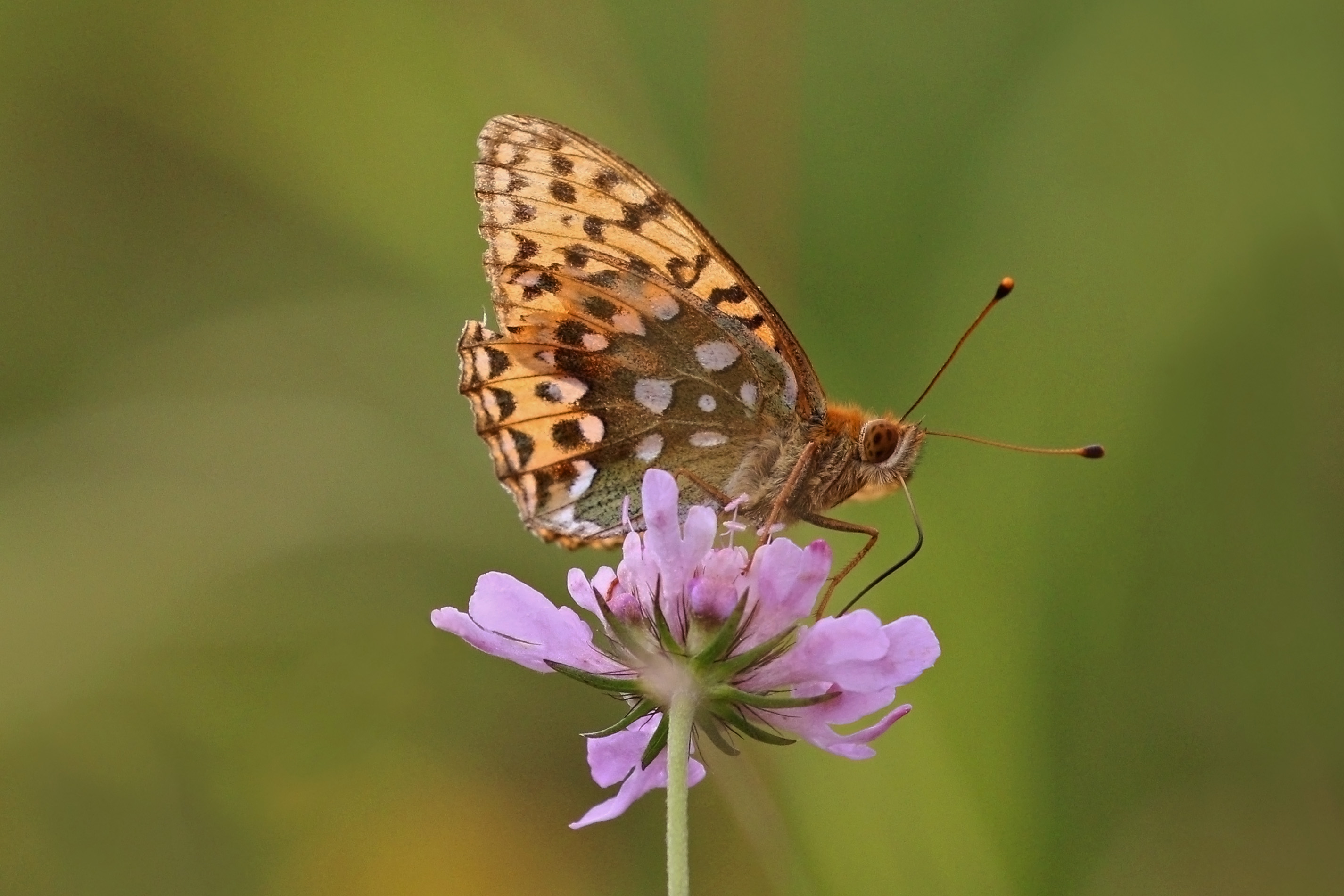
Female underside

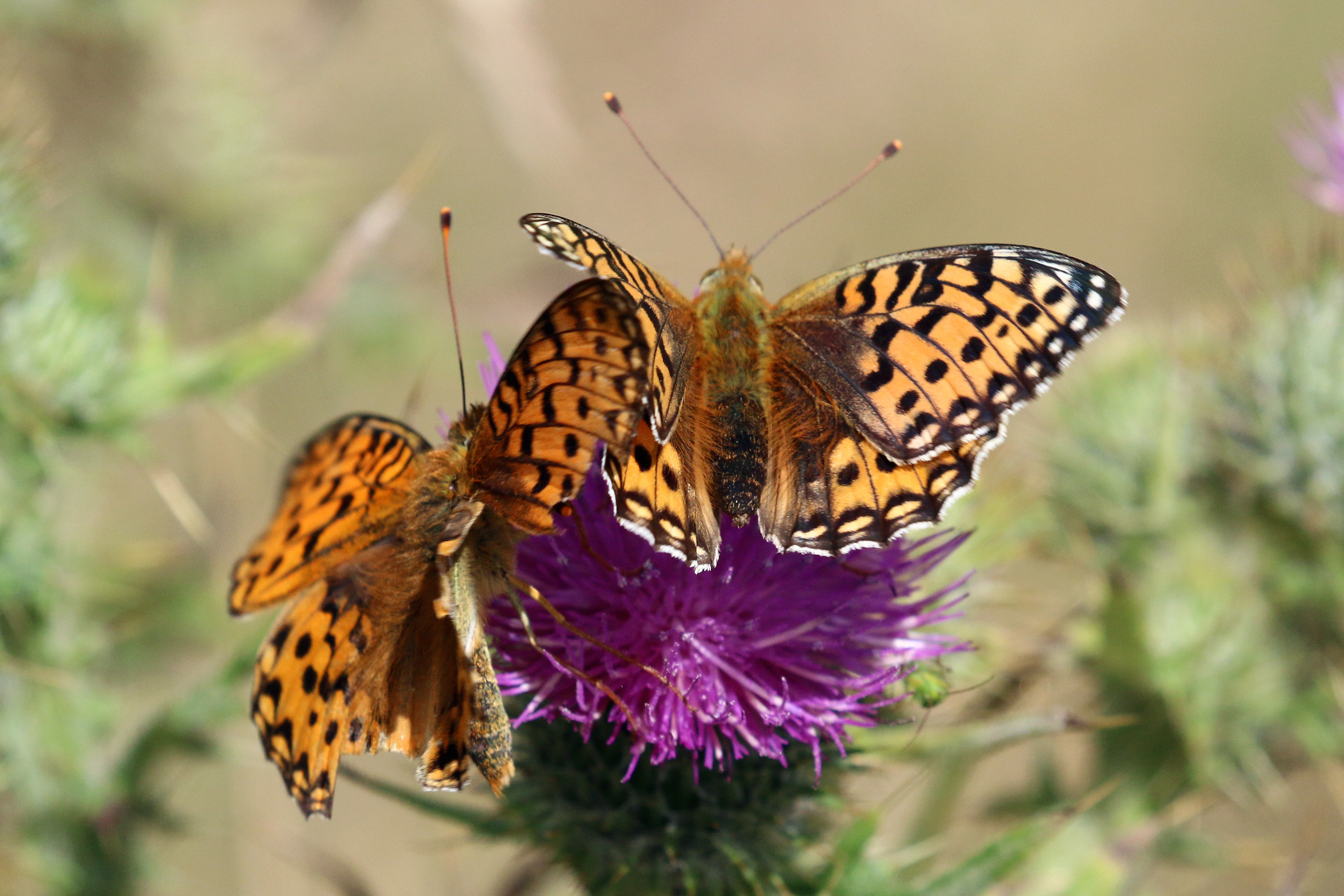
Male and female

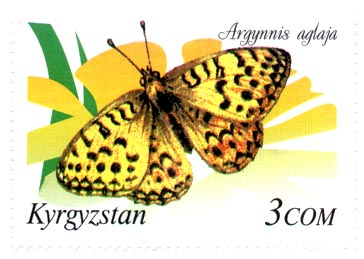
Kyrgyzstan postage stamp

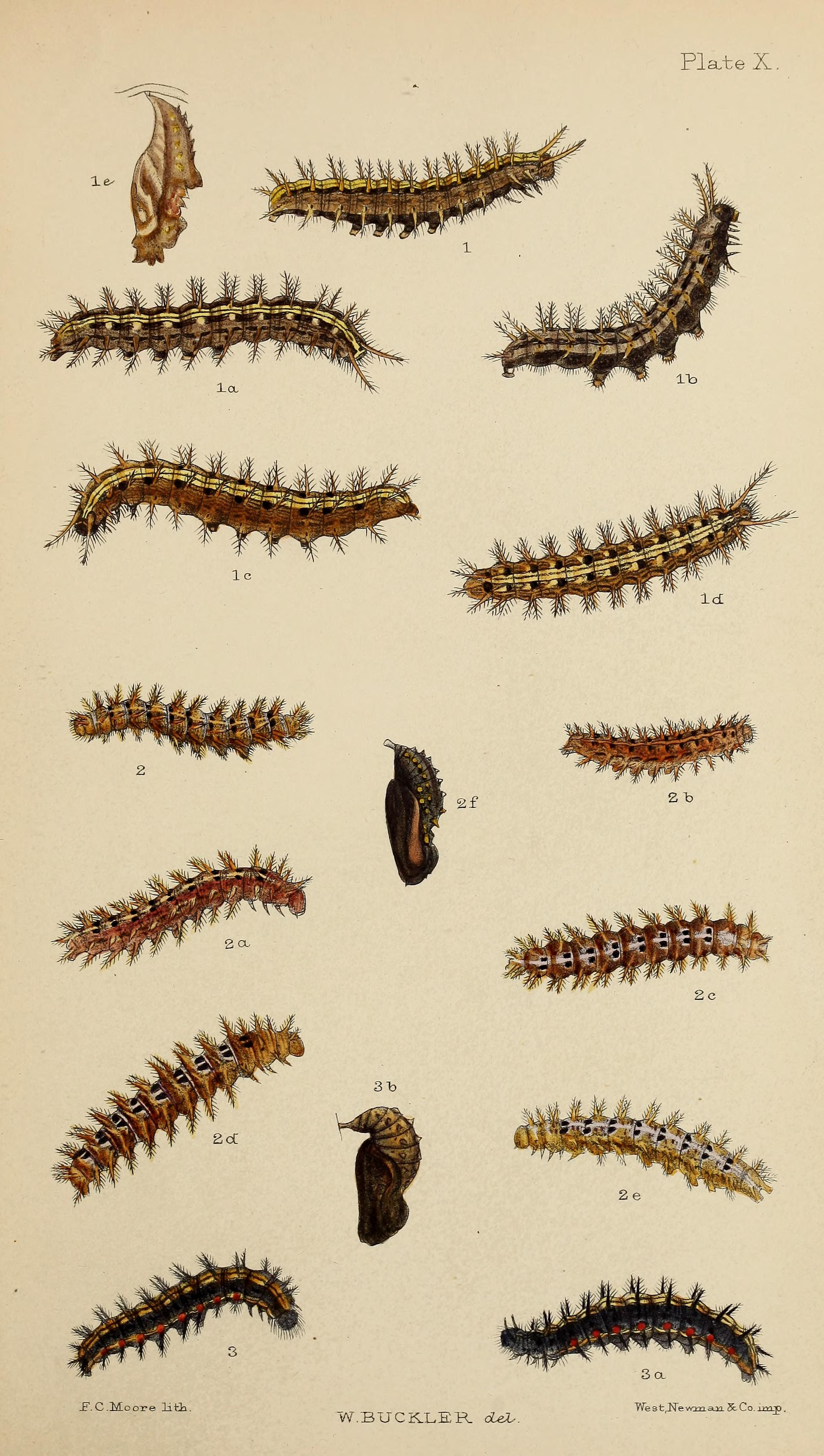
Figs.2,2a,2b, 2c, 2d, 2e larva after last moult 2f pupa

== Description in Seitz ==
The large fritillary is fiery reddish yellow above, the basal area of the male being always duller. The markings are constant: a black margin, a row of deep black but thin marginal arcs, a very straight, central row of dots, of which only the last one of the forewing is shifted distad; between this row of dots and the base there are six thin black transverse bands extending from the subcostal vein into the wing. The underside of the hindwing is characteristic; it bears numerous silver-spots on a partly verdigris partly leather-yellow ground, but never a row of ocelli in the marginal area, as is the case in the forms of the Niobe fritillary (Fabriciana niobe) and high brown fritillary (F. adippe).

== Biology ==
Dark green fritillaries lay ther eggs in the high summer in Great Britain, either on or in the vicinity of species of Viola. When the caterpillar hatches it eats its eggshell and immediately begins to hibernate. In the following Spring the caterpillars emerge from hibernation and feed on violets, typically common dog-violet (Viola riviniana) but also the marsh dog violet (V. palustris) and the heath dog violet (V. canina), and complete their life cycle, pupating in May, with the butterflies emerging a few weeks later. The will nectar on common knapweed (Centaurea nigra), marsh thistle (Cirsium palustre), devil's-bit scabious (Succisa pratensis) and field scabious (Knautia arvensis).
