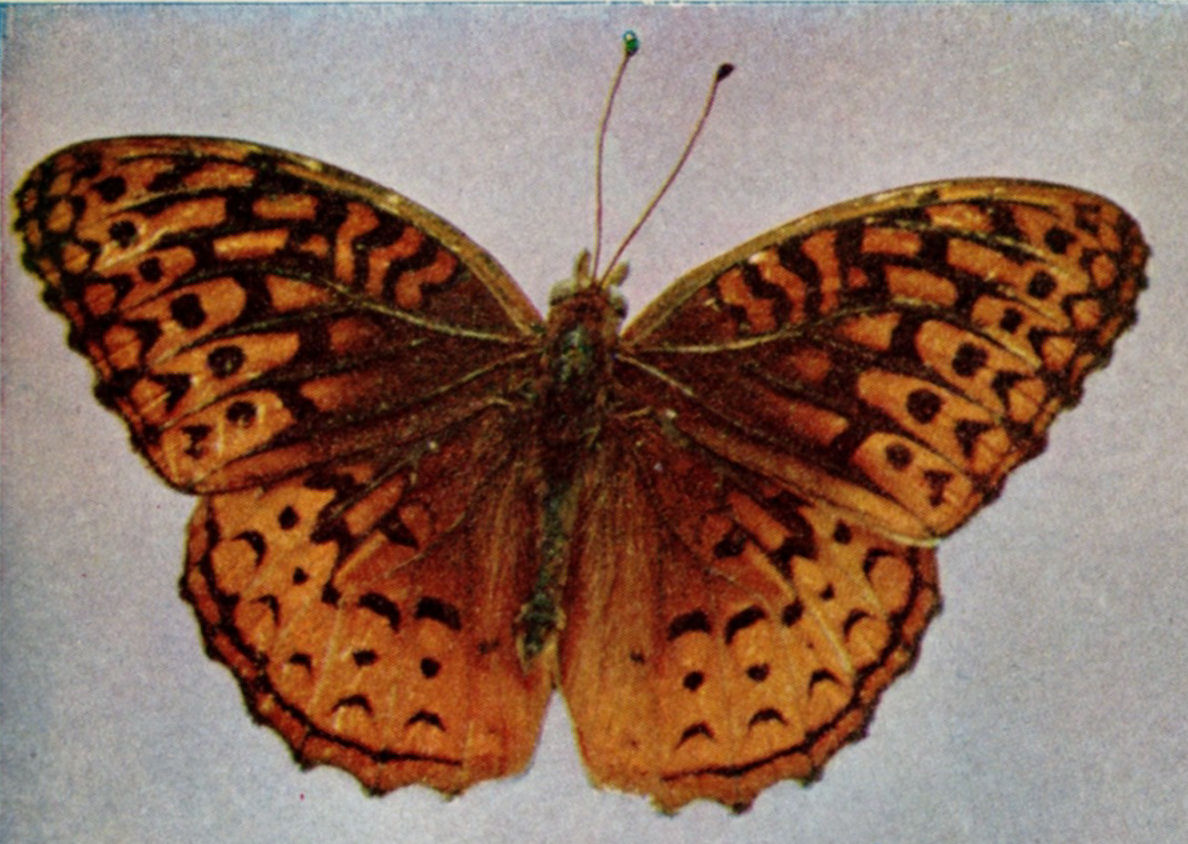
- S. a. alcestis

Conservation status
- Secure (NatureServe)

Scientific classification
- Kingdom: Animalia
- Phylum: Arthropoda
- Clade: Pancrustacea
- Class: Insecta
- Order: Lepidoptera
- Family: Nymphalidae
- Genus: Speyeria
- Species: S. aphrodite

Binomial name
- Speyeria aphrodite (Fabricius, 1787)

= Aphrodite fritillary =

Species of butterfly

The Aphrodite fritillary (Speyeria aphrodite) is a fritillary butterfly, from North America.

This orange coloured fritillary has rows of dark dots or chevrons at the wing edges and black or brown lines more proximally. The ventral sides of the wings are also orange with several rows of white dots. Its wingspan is between 51 and 73 mm.

Aphrodite fritillaries are sensitive to temperature with population trajectories showing declines in response to climate warming trends.

== Subspecies ==
Listed alphabetically:

- S. a. alcestis (Edwards, 1876)
- S. a. byblis (Barnes & Benjamin, 1926)
- S. a. columbia (H. Edwards, 1877)
- S. a. ethene (Hemming, 1933)
- S. a. manitoba (F. & R. Chermock, 1940)
- S. a. whitehousei (Gunder, 1932)
- S. a. winni (Gunder, 1932)

== Similar species ==
- Atlantis fritillary (Speyeria atlantis)
- Great spangled fritillary (Speyeria cybele)
- Northwestern fritillary (Speyeria hesperis)
