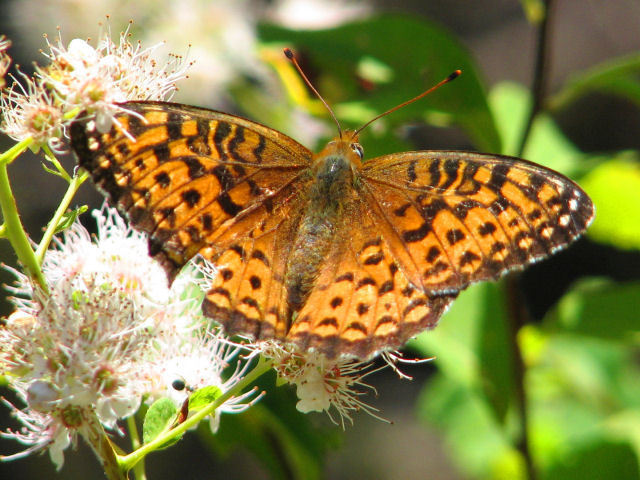
- Temagami, Ontario
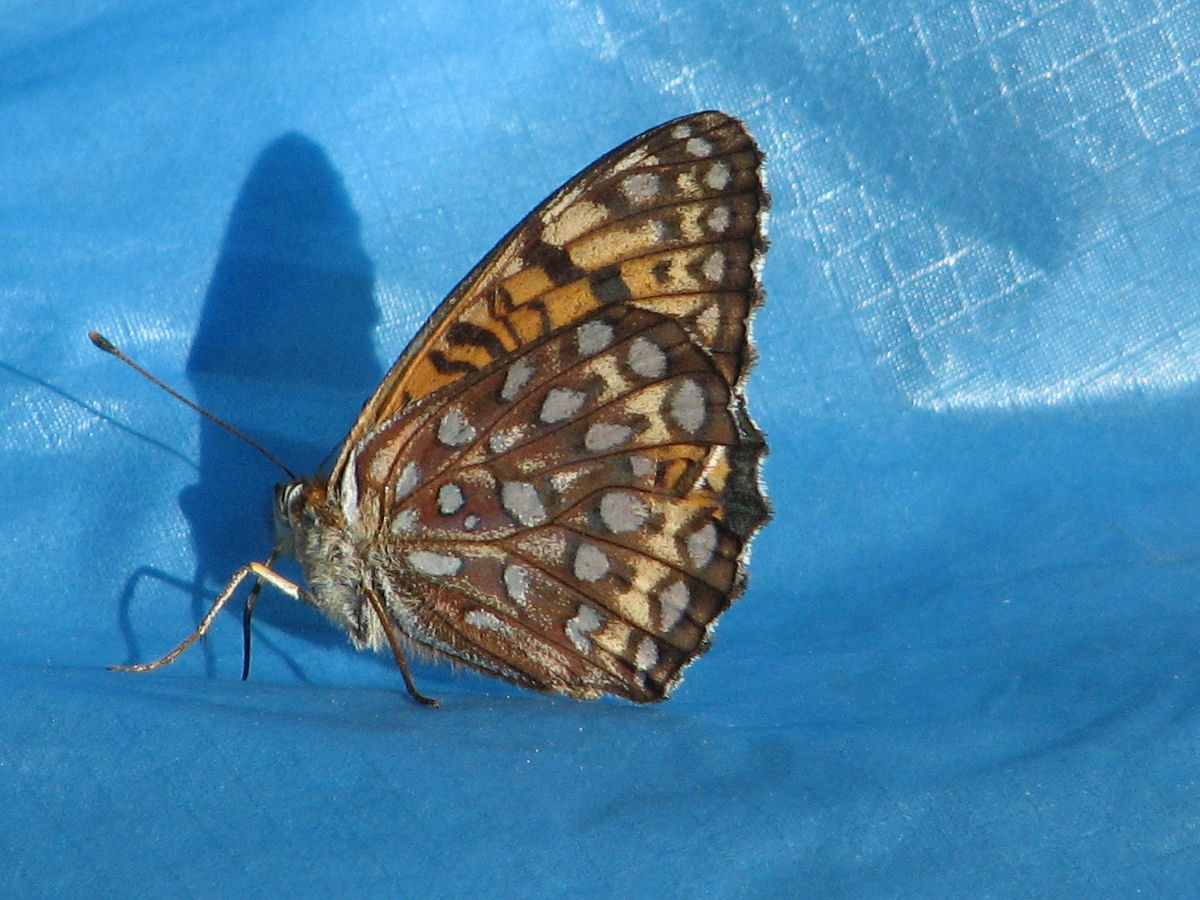
- View of underwings

Conservation status
- Secure (NatureServe)

Scientific classification
- Kingdom: Animalia
- Phylum: Arthropoda
- Class: Insecta
- Order: Lepidoptera
- Family: Nymphalidae
- Genus: Speyeria
- Species: S. atlantis

Binomial name
- Speyeria atlantis (W.H. Edwards, 1862)

= Speyeria atlantis =

Species of butterfly

Speyeria atlantis, the Atlantis fritillary, is a butterfly of the family Nymphalidae of North America. It is found from the Avalon Peninsula of Newfoundland and Labrador to northern British Columbia, across the northern United States south as far as Colorado and West Virginia. It resides as far north as James Bay. The species is listed as endangered in Connecticut.

== Description ==
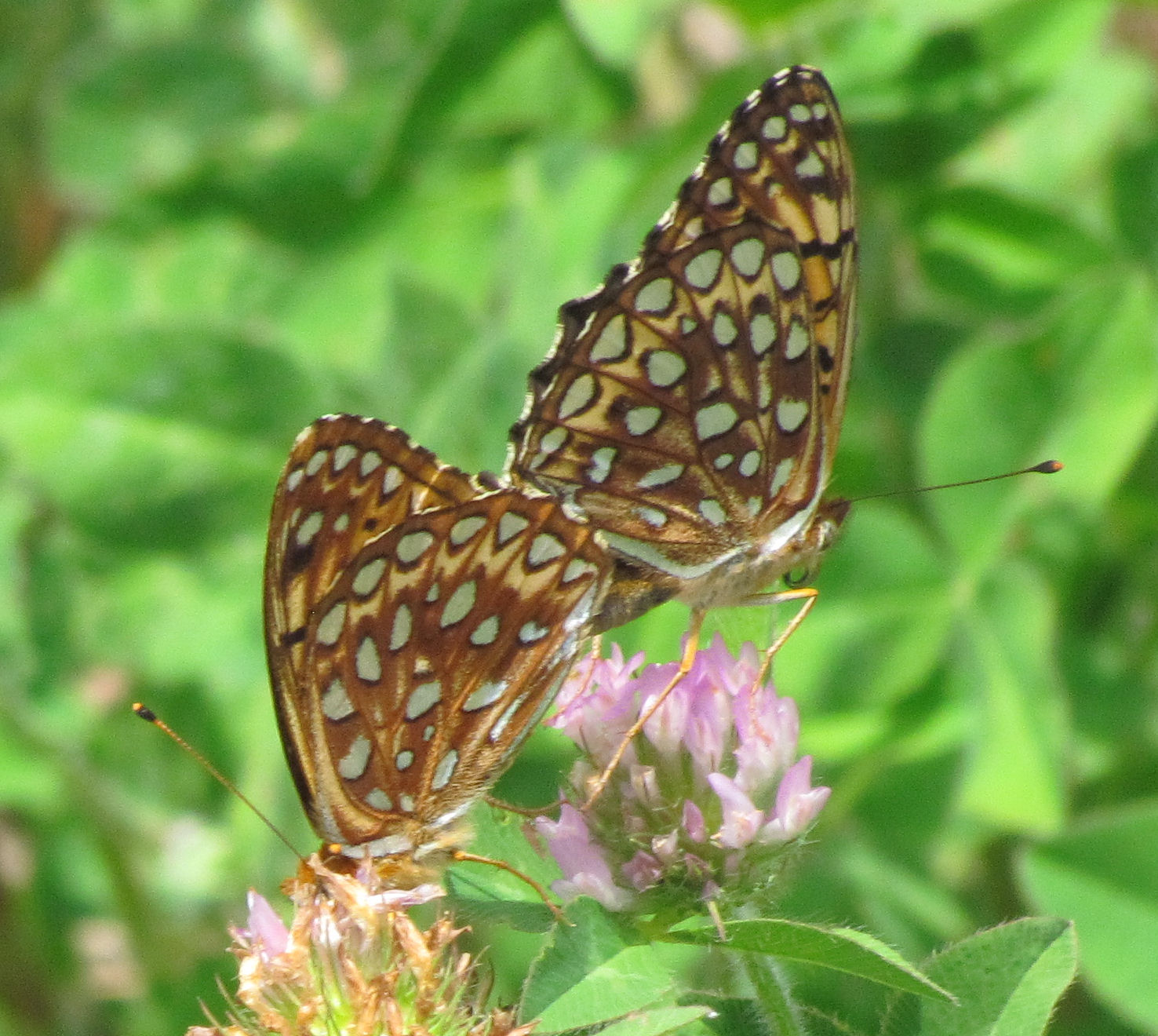
Mating

Its upperside is dark orange with many rows of black markings and black wing margins. Its underside is a light brown with many silvery-white spots. Wingspan ranges from 50–64 millimetres (2.0–2.5 in).

== Life cycle ==
The larvae are hosted by violets. Adult foods include common milkweed, mint, mountain laurel, crown vetch, burdock, boneset, ox-eye daisy, spiraea, and virgin's bower.

== Threats ==
Atlantis fritillaries are sensitive to temperature with population trajectories showing declines in response to climate warming trends.

== Subspecies ==
Listed alphabetically:

- S. a. atlantis
- S. a. canadensis (dos Passos, 1935)
- S. a. chitone (Edwards, 1879)
- S. a. dodgei (Gunder, 1931)
- S. a. beani (Barnes & Benjamin, 1926)
- S. a. dennisi dos Passos & Grey, 1947
- S. a. dorothea Moeck, 1947
- S. a. electa (Edwards, 1878)
- S. a. elko Austin, 1983
- S. a. greyi (Moeck, 1950)
- S. a. hesperis (Edwards, 1864)
- S. a. hollandi (F. & R. Chermock, 1940)
- S. a. hutchinsi dos Passos & Grey, 1947
- S. a. irene (Boisduval, 1869)
- S. a. lais (Edwards, 1883)
- S. a. lurana dos Passos & Grey, 1945
- S. a. nausicaa (Edwards, 1874)
- S. a. nikias (Ehrmann, 1917)
- S. a. schellbachi Garth, 1949
- S. a. tetonia dos Passos & Grey, 1945
- S. a. viola dos Passos & Grey, 1945
- S. a. wasatchia dos Passos & Grey, 1945

== Similar species ==
- Aphrodite fritillary (Speyeria aphrodite)
- Great spangled fritillary (Speyeria cybele)
- Northwestern fritillary (Speyeria hesperis)
