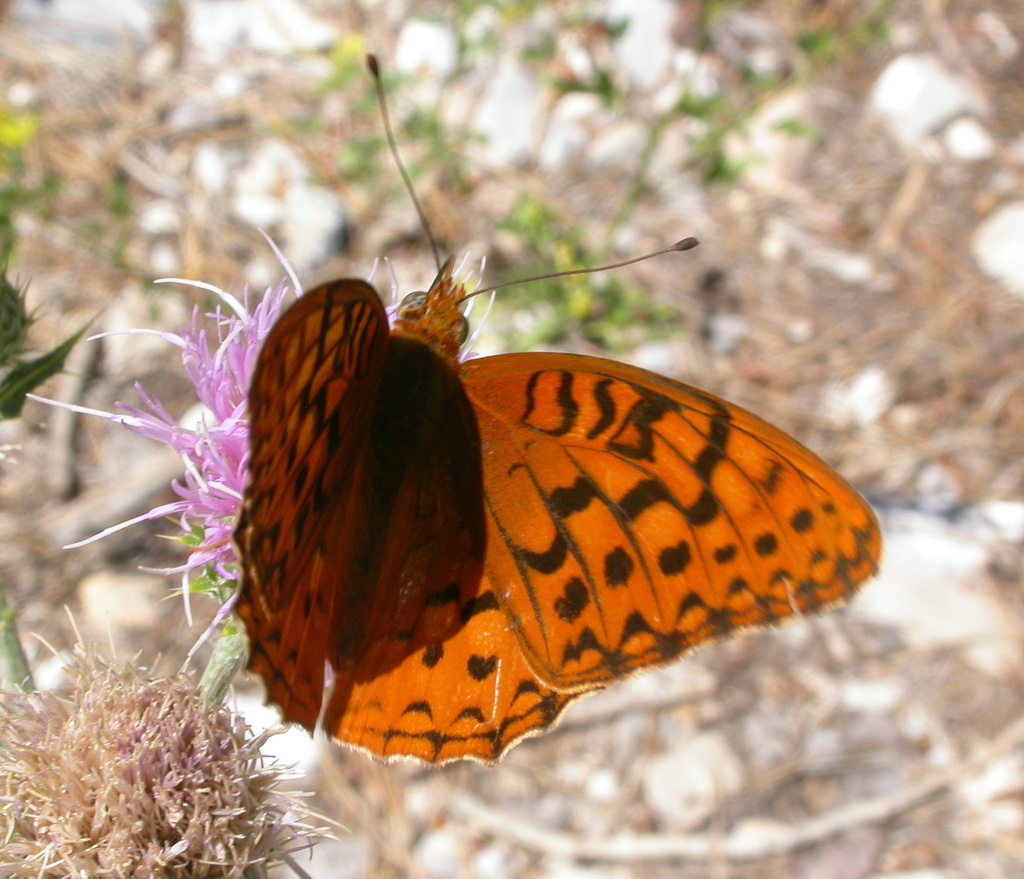

Scientific classification
- Domain: Eukaryota
- Kingdom: Animalia
- Phylum: Arthropoda
- Class: Insecta
- Order: Lepidoptera
- Family: Nymphalidae
- Genus: Speyeria
- Species: S. carolae

Binomial name
- Speyeria carolae (dos Passos & Grey, 1942)

Synonyms
- Argynnis coronis carolae dos Passos & Grey, 1942

= Speyeria carolae =

Species of butterfly

Speyeria carolae, or Carole's fritillary, is a butterfly in the family Nymphalidae (brush-footed butterflies). It was described by Cyril Franklin dos Passos and Lionel Paul Grey in 1942 and is found in North America, where it has only been recorded from the Charleston Mountains of Clark County, Nevada. The habitat consists of mountain slopes, foothills and forest openings.

The wingspan is 69–86 mm. Adults are on wing from mid-June to September in one generation per year.

The larvae feed on the leaves of Viola charlestonensis.

The MONA or Hodges number for Speyeria carolae is 4456.1.
