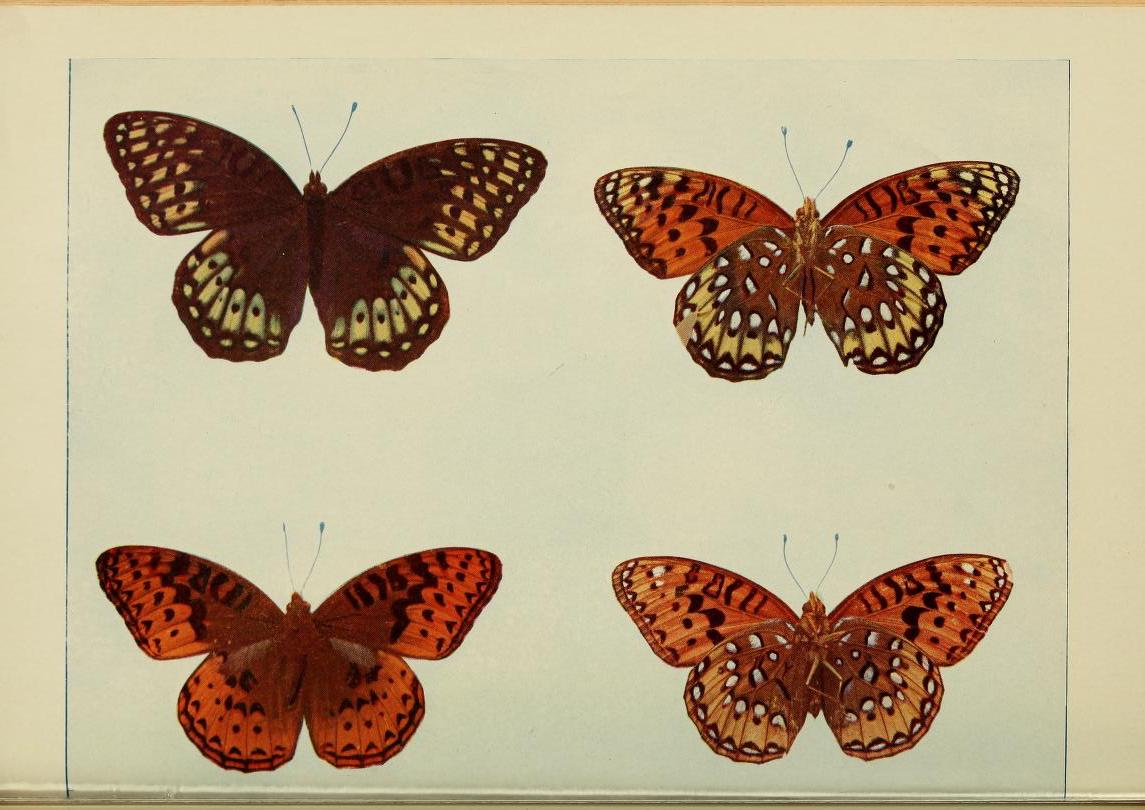
- Speyeria nokomis nigrocaerulea

Scientific classification
- Kingdom: Animalia
- Phylum: Arthropoda
- Clade: Pancrustacea
- Class: Insecta
- Order: Lepidoptera
- Family: Nymphalidae
- Genus: Speyeria
- Species: S. nokomis

Binomial name
- Speyeria nokomis (W. H. Edwards, 1862)

= Speyeria nokomis =

Species of butterfly

Speyeria nokomis, the nokomis fritillary, is a species of fritillary in the family Nymphalidae. It is found in North America.

== Subspecies ==
These nine subspecies belong to the species Speyeria nokomis:

- Speyeria nokomis apacheana (Skinner, 1918)^{i c g}
- Speyeria nokomis caerulescens Holland, 1900^{c g}
- Speyeria nokomis carsonensis Austin in T. Emmel, 1998^{i g}
- Speyeria nokomis coerulescens (W. Holland, 1900)^{i g}
- Speyeria nokomis nigrocaerulea (W. P. Cockerell & Cockerell, 1900)^{c g}
- Speyeria nokomis nitocris (W. H. Edwards, 1874)^{i}
- Speyeria nokomis nokomis (W. H. Edwards, 1862)^{i g}
- Speyeria nokomis valesinoalba Reuss, 1926^{c g}
- Speyeria nokomis wenona Dos Passos & Grey, 1945^{c g}

Data sources: i = ITIS, c = Catalogue of Life, g = GBIF, b = Bugguide.net
