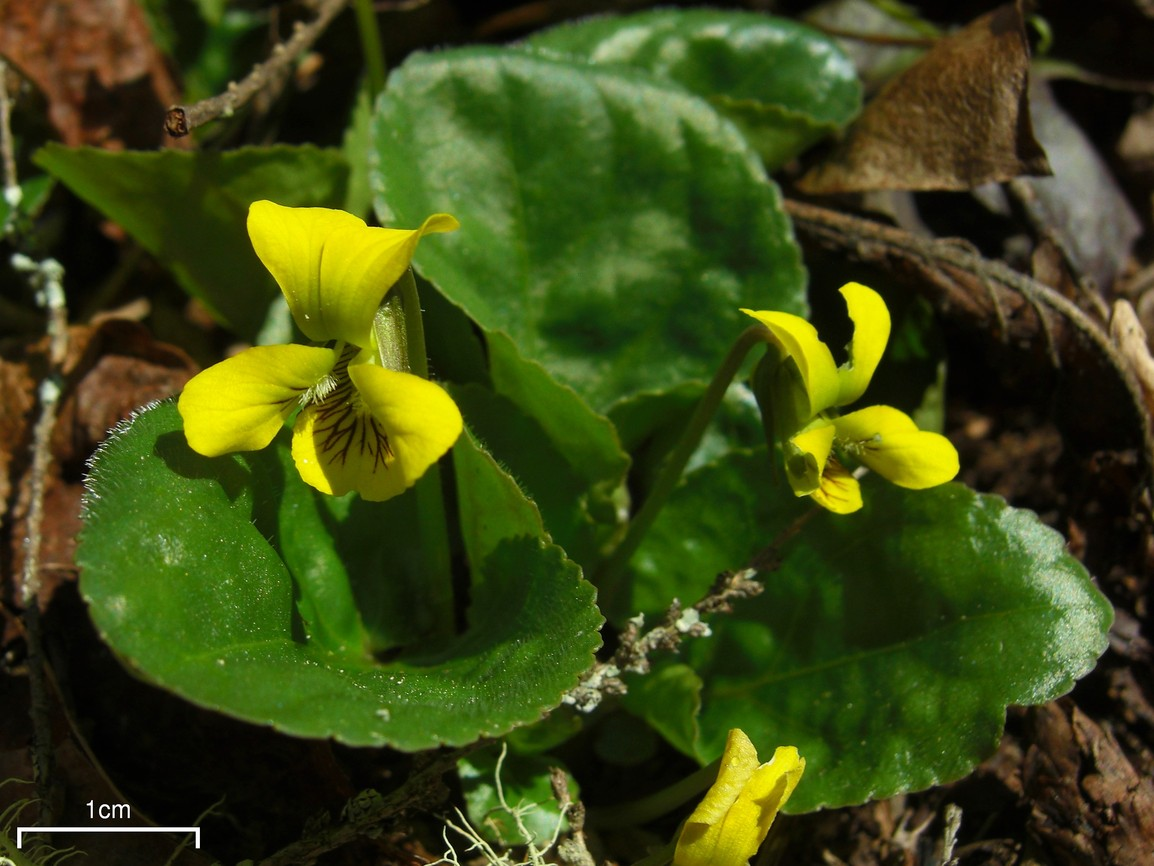

Conservation status
- Secure (NatureServe)

Scientific classification
- Kingdom: Plantae
- Clade: Tracheophytes
- Clade: Angiosperms
- Clade: Eudicots
- Clade: Rosids
- Order: Malpighiales
- Family: Violaceae
- Genus: Viola
- Species: V. rotundifolia

Binomial name
- Viola rotundifolia Michx.

= Viola rotundifolia =

Species of flowering plant

Viola rotundifolia, common name roundleaf yellow violet, is a plant species of the genus Viola. It is found in mesic habitat areas of the eastern United States and Canada; from Tennessee and Kentucky south to Georgia. It grows 2 to 4 inches tall with leaves and flowers on separate stalks.
