= Jeane Daniel Gunder =

American entomologist

Jeane Daniel Gunder (born 1888, New York – died 1948, Pasadena ) was an American entomologist who specialised in butterflies.

Gunder described 212 taxa of butterflies mostly races and forms. In 1937, having lost his income in the economic depression he sold his collection of 28,000 specimens to the American Museum of Natural History.

== Works ==
Partial list

- North American Institutions Featuring Lepidoptera, 1929–30. First published as parts in Entomological News and then as a bound volume.
- The genus Euphydryas Scud. of boreal America (Lepidoptera, Nymphalidae). Pan-Pacific Entomologist 6(1): 1–8, 16 pls. (July 1929).
- 1930. Butterflies of Los Angeles County, California. Bulletin of the Southern California Academy of Sciences 29(2): 39–95, pls. 18–23.
