= Speyeria hesperis =

- Speyeria hesperis beani, Banff, Alberta

Scientific classification
- Kingdom: Animalia
- Phylum: Arthropoda
- Clade: Pancrustacea
- Class: Insecta
- Order: Lepidoptera
- Family: Nymphalidae
- Genus: Speyeria
- Species: S. hesperis

Binomial name
- Speyeria hesperis (W.H. Edwards, 1864)

Species of butterfly

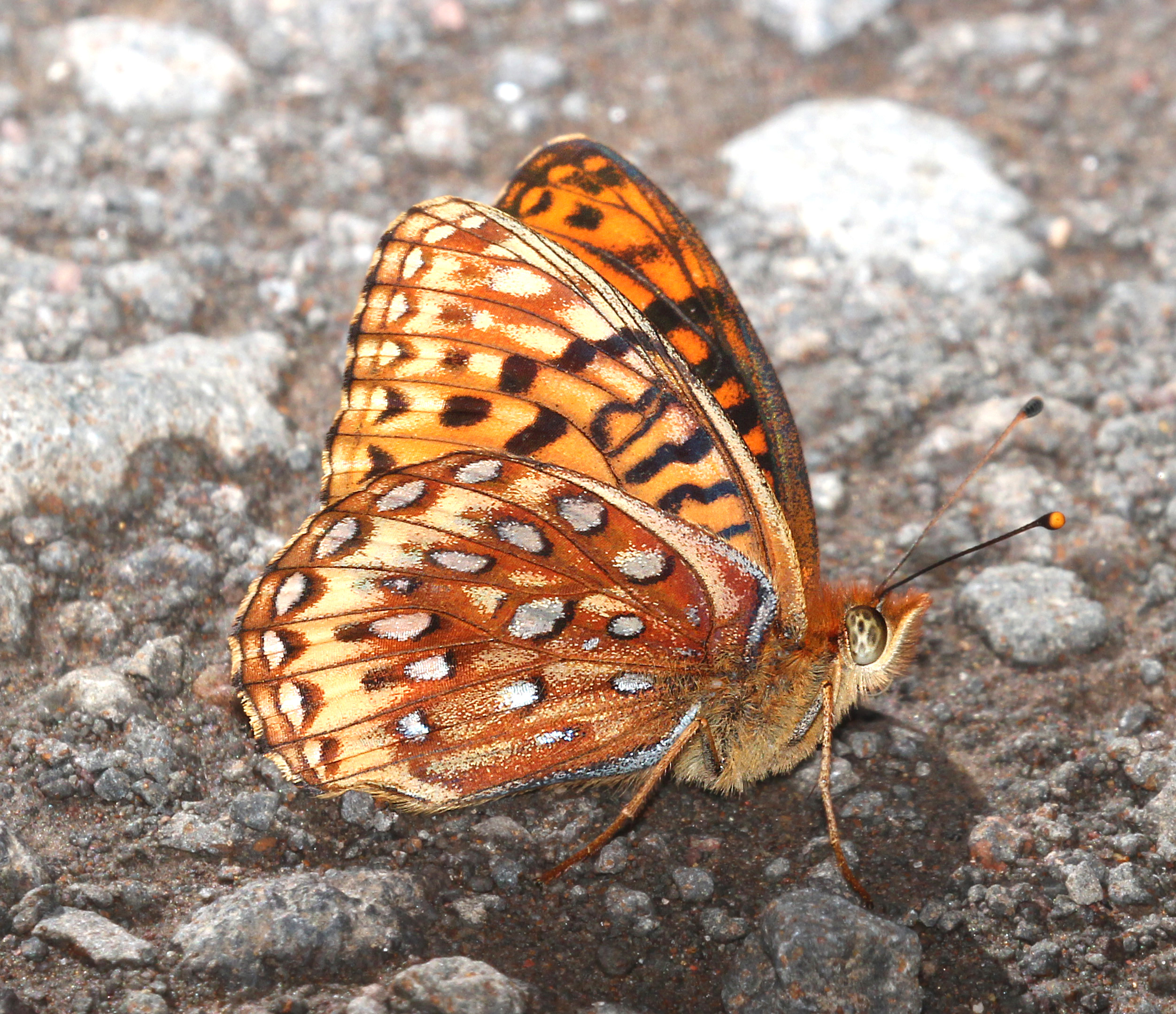
in Arizona

Speyeria hesperis, the northwestern fritillary, is a butterfly of the family Nymphalidae. It is found in the northwestern United States and western Canada, as far east as Manitoba and the Dakotas.

With a wingspan of between 45–58 millimetres (1.8–2.3 in), this fritillary is relatively small. It has bright orange uppersides (yellow in females) and thinner black markings than most fritillaries.

== Similar species ==
- Aphrodite fritillary (Speyeria aphrodite)
- Atlantis fritillary (Speyeria atlantis)
