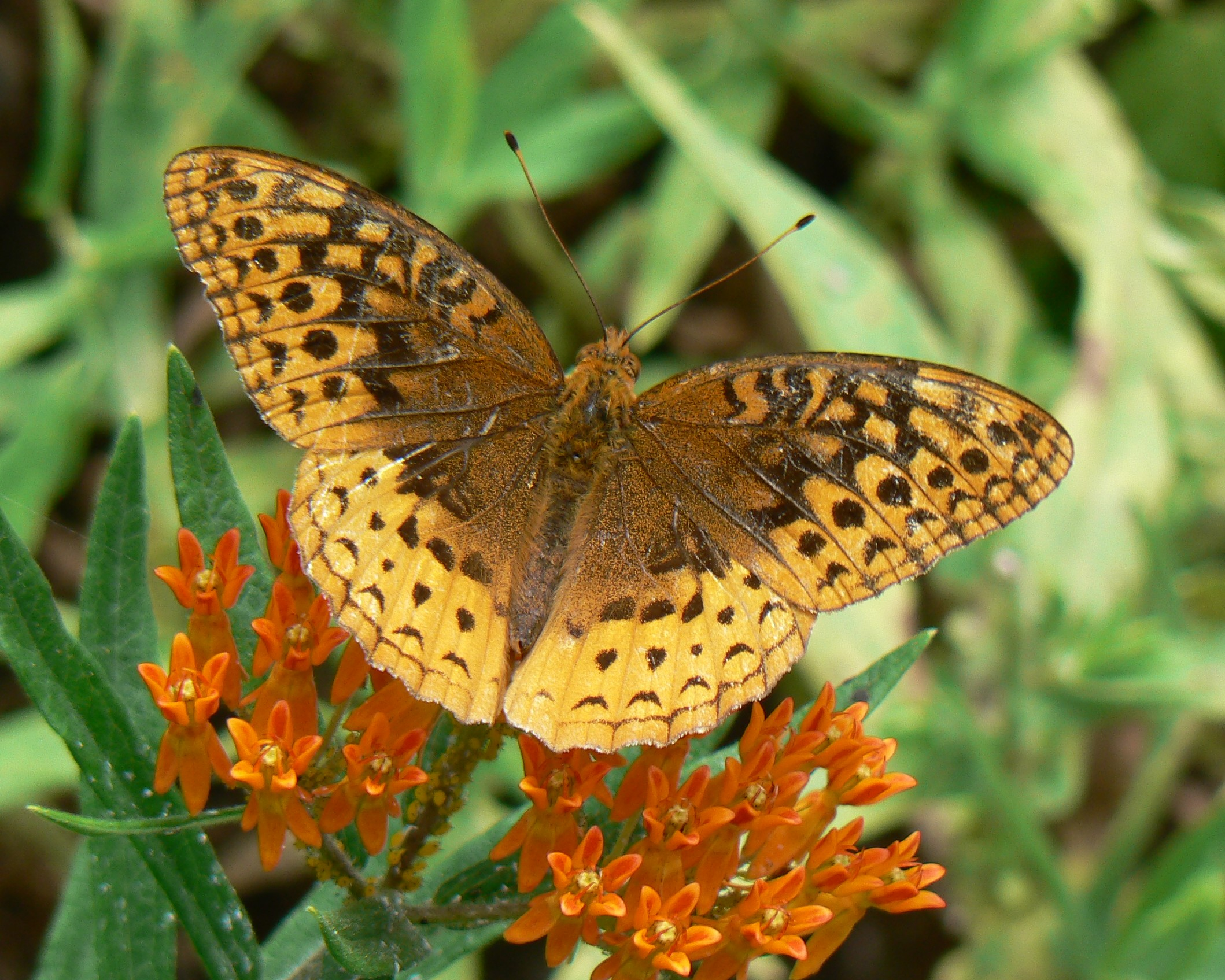
- Speyeria cybele feeding on Asclepias tuberosa.

Scientific classification
- Kingdom: Animalia
- Phylum: Arthropoda
- Clade: Pancrustacea
- Class: Insecta
- Order: Lepidoptera
- Family: Nymphalidae
- Tribe: Argynnini
- Genus: Speyeria; Scudder, 1872

Species
- See text

Synonyms
- Mesoacidalia Reuss, 1926; Neoacidalia Reuss, 1926; Proacidalia Reuss, 1926; Semnopsyche Scudder, 1875

= Speyeria =

Greater fritillaries

Genus of brush-footed butterflies

Speyeria, commonly known as greater fritillaries, is a genus of butterflies in the family Nymphalidae commonly found in North America, Europe, and Asia. Some authors used to consider this taxon a subgenus of Argynnis, but it was reestablished as a separate genus in 2017.

== Species ==
The genus has 3 species in Eurasia (these were formerly known as genus Mesoacidalia, now a synonym of Speyeria):

- Speyeria aglaja (Linnaeus, 1758) – Dark green fritillary
- Speyeria alexandra (Ménétriés, 1832)
- Speyeria clara (Blanchard, [1844])

and 16 species in North America:

- Speyeria diana (Cramer, [1777]) – Diana fritillary
- Speyeria cybele (Fabricius, 1775) – great spangled fritillary
- Speyeria aphrodite (Fabricius, 1787) – Aphrodite fritillary
- Speyeria idalia (Drury, [1773]) – regal fritillary
- Speyeria nokomis (Edwards, 1862) – Nokomis fritillary
- Speyeria edwardsii (Reakirt, 1866) – Edward's fritillary
- Speyeria coronis (Behr, 1864) – Coronis fritillary
- Speyeria zerene (Boisduval, 1852) – zerene fritillary
- Speyeria carolae (dos Passos & Grey, 1942) – Carole's fritillary
- Speyeria callippe (Boisduval, 1852) – callippe fritillary
- Speyeria egleis (Behr, 1863) – Egleis fritillary
- Speyeria adiaste (Edwards, 1864) – unsilvered fritillary or Adiaste fritillary
- Speyeria atlantis (Edwards, 1862) – Atlantis fritillary
- Speyeria hesperis (Edwards, 1864) – northwestern fritillary
- Speyeria hydaspe (Boisduval, 1869) – Hydaspe fritillary
- Speyeria mormonia (Boisduval, 1869) – Mormon fritillary
