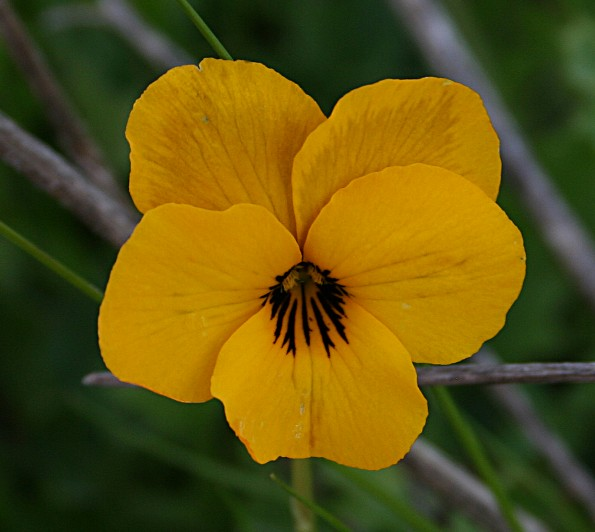

Conservation status
- Secure (NatureServe)

Scientific classification
- Kingdom: Plantae
- Clade: Embryophytes
- Clade: Tracheophytes
- Clade: Spermatophytes
- Clade: Angiosperms
- Clade: Eudicots
- Clade: Rosids
- Order: Malpighiales
- Family: Violaceae
- Genus: Viola
- Species: V. pedunculata

Binomial name
- Viola pedunculata Torr. & A. Gray

Synonyms
- Viola pedunculata subsp. typica M.S.Baker & J.C.Clausen; Viola pedunculata var. tenuifolia (M.S.Baker & J.C.Clausen) J.T.Howell; Viola pedunculata subsp. tenuifolia M.S.Baker & J.C.Clausen

= Viola pedunculata =

Species of flowering plant

Viola pedunculata, the California golden violet, Johnny jump up, or yellow pansy, is a perennial yellow wildflower of the coast and coastal ranges in California and northwestern Baja California. However, the common name "Johnny jump up" is usually associated with Viola tricolor, an introduced garden annual.

The plant grows on open, grassy slopes, in chaparral habitats, and in oak woodlands, from sea level to around 3,280 feet (1,000 m). It prefers part shade, but will tolerate sun in many locations.

== Description ==
Viola pedunculata is a perennial, growing from a spongy rhizome. The plant is often low-growing, but can reach a height of 6 inches (15 cm).

The leaves are 1–5.5 centimetres (0.39–2.17 in) long, cordate (heart-shaped) to deltate-ovate (oblong-triangular), scalloped or toothed, and glabrous or hairy. They are summer deciduous.

The fragrant flowers appear in March and April, and are a rich, saturated yellow to yellow-orange, with brown-purple nectar guides on the lower petals. The flowers are hermaphrodite, and are pollinated by native and introduced insects. Dried in air, the seeds weigh about 4 milligrams (0.00014 oz) each.

Subspecies

- Viola pedunculata ssp. pedunculata
- Viola pedunculata ssp. tenuifolia

== Uses ==
=== Culinary ===
The leaves were used by the Diegueno and Luiseno indigenous people of California for food: The young leaves were picked before the flowers appeared in the spring, then boiled, and used as greens.

The flower buds and petals are edible. As with other yellow flowers in the genus Viola, large quantities may cause diarrhea.
An herbal tea or tisane can be brewed from the leaves.

== Cultivation ==
The plant is cultivated as an ornamental plant by specialty plant nurseries, for planting as a drought tolerant seasonal groundcover or flowering accent plant in native plant and wildlife gardens; and as a potted plant.

They are propagated by seed or nursery/garden divisions. The plant prefers rich soil, and no irrigation water in summer, when it is dormant.

When cultivated in colder climates outside its native range where not so hardy, it is most successful when propagated in a cold frame.
