= Mulyeongari Oreum =

Extinct volcano in Jeju Province, South Korea

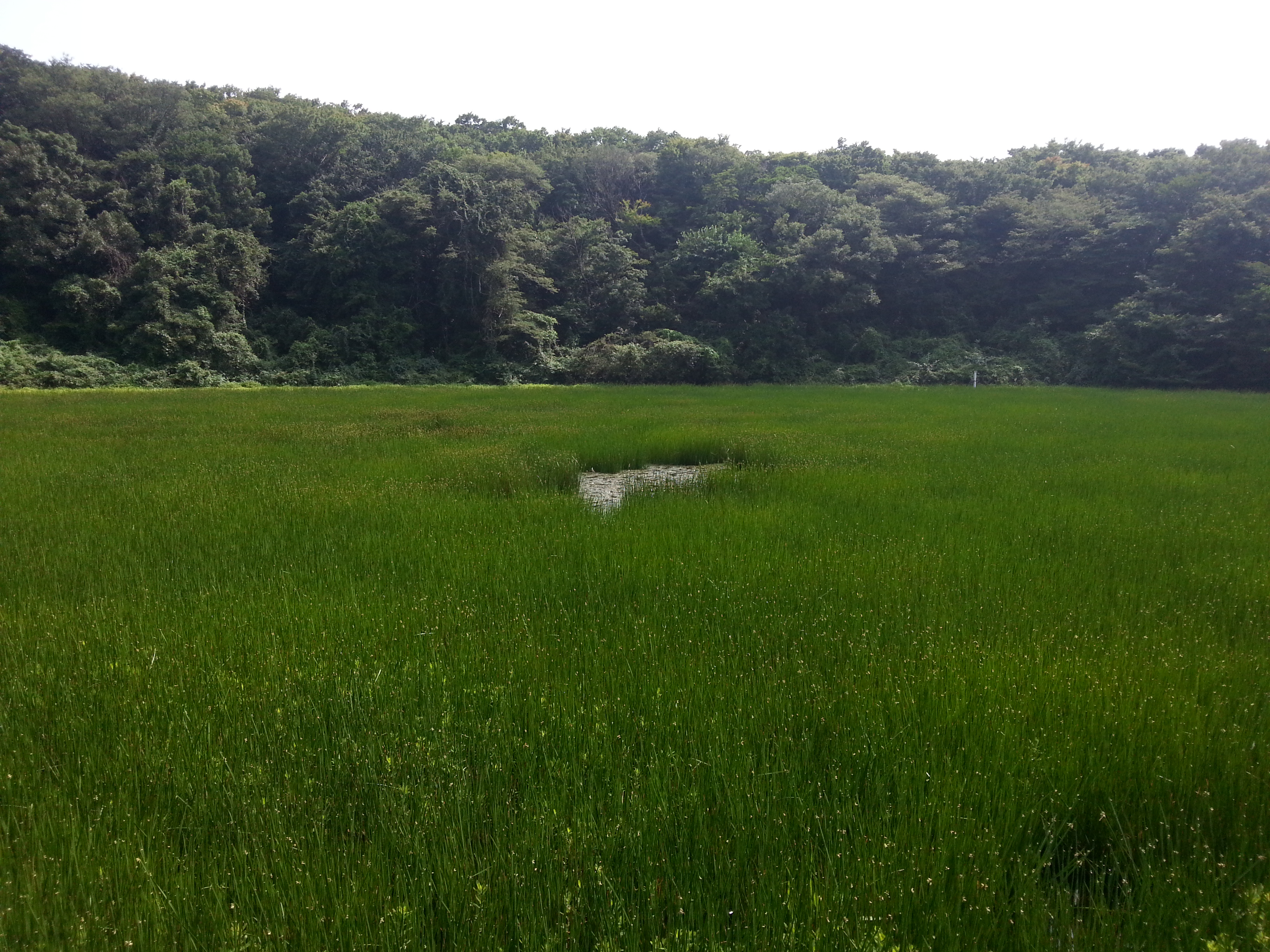
- Wetland on the oreum (2026)

Highest point
- Elevation: 508 m (1,667 ft)
- Coordinates: 33.3693°N 126.6932°E

Geography
- Location: Seogwipo, Jeju Province, South Korea

Mulyeongari Oreum (Korean: 물영아리오름) is an oreum (small extinct volcano; parasitic cone) on Jeju Island, South Korea. It has a lake and wetland. It is the only wetland in Korea which is located within a volcanic crater in an oreum.

The oreum is one of the secondary volcanoes around the Hallasan volcano, which is the highest mountain in South Korea. Through continuing scientific research, it is thought that Mulyeongari Oreum was formed by volcanic activity continuing for 2,500 years at the end of the third Cenozoic Era on Jeju Island. On top of the oreum, there is a shallow crater lake which displays a unique example of a wetland. The level of water changes with the seasons due to rainfall and the particular geology. Some 370 parasitic cones are located around Hallasan. Only about 30% of them have mountain craters. The geology is mostly composed of water-permeable basalt, so it is unusual to have a lake on top of such volcanic cones. During the dry season, most of wetland becomes dries out, except the deepest part in the south (about 50m of water depth). During the rainy season, most of it is submerged.

== Characteristics ==
The mountain crater lake formed in a volcanic crater, 900m-937m above sea-level, 9 km northeast of Hallasan. The 628000m^{2} lake provides water, which is not abundant on the island, to the indigenous wildlife.

Mulyeongari Oreum is located on the Mt. Suryeong (sea level attitude : 508m) on the Halla mountain in Jeju island. It is a typical parasitic cone and the mouth of a volcano has a girth of 300m, 40m in depth and 1,000m circumference around the crater. Viewed from the summit of the mountain north of crater, its external shape has a concentric circle and hollowed surface in the middle of crater respectively.

The oreum forms a shallow crater lake on top of it. The level of water in the crater-lake changes by the seasons. In the dry season, the crater-lake maintains lower level which makes the area have wetland personalities. Organic materials flow down the slope around the wetland and gather the bottom of the crater which the wetland is located. The wetland displays the distinctive layer of floras. The wetland does not show wide biodiversity.

The wetland also exhibits the characteristics of the wetlands in temperate climate zone and high moor due to the height of the mountain (508m), at which Mulyeongari Oreum is located.

The wetland forms a closed ecosystem due to the shape of the crate which the wetland is placed. This closed ecosystem presents a distinctive fauna. Particularly near the wetland, different plants are growing in concentric circles. Due to the closed circulation of ecosystem, the wetland is claimed to face easy degradation and extinction.

== Flora and fauna ==
Insects

- giant water bug (Lethocerus deyrollei)
- Plateumaris sericea
- Gryllotalpa orientalis
- Anisodactylus signatus
- Fabriciana nerippe coreana (F:Papilionoidea)
- Lethocerus deyrollei (F: Belostomatidae).

47 insect species in 24 families, 5 orders, were observed

Amphibians

- boreal digging frog (Kaloula borealis)
- Rana nigromaculata
- Hynobius leechii

2 orders, 3 families, 6 species (37 individuals) in amphibians and 1 order, 3 families, 8 species (15 individuals) were found and captured

Birds

- Peregrine falcon (Falco peregrinus)
- Fairy pitta (Pitta brachyura nympha)
- Black kite (Milvus migrans)
- Japanese sparrowhawk (Accipiter gularis)
- Japanese paradise-flycatcher (Terpsiphone atrocaudata)
- Black paradise flycatcher (Terpsiphone atrocaudata)

Plants

- Painted Maple (Acer pictum subsp. mono)
- Carpinus laxiflora
- Cornus kousa
- Euonymus fortunei
- Juncus effusus
- Paeonia obovata
- Persicaria hydropiper
- Persicaria thunbergii
- Polygonum muricatum
- Rosa multiflora
- Rubus coreanus
- Scirpus triqueter
- Smilax china
- Torreya nucifera

210 plants (74 family 154 genus) were observed, another source states 69 families, 136 genera, 181 species of flowering plants exist here.
