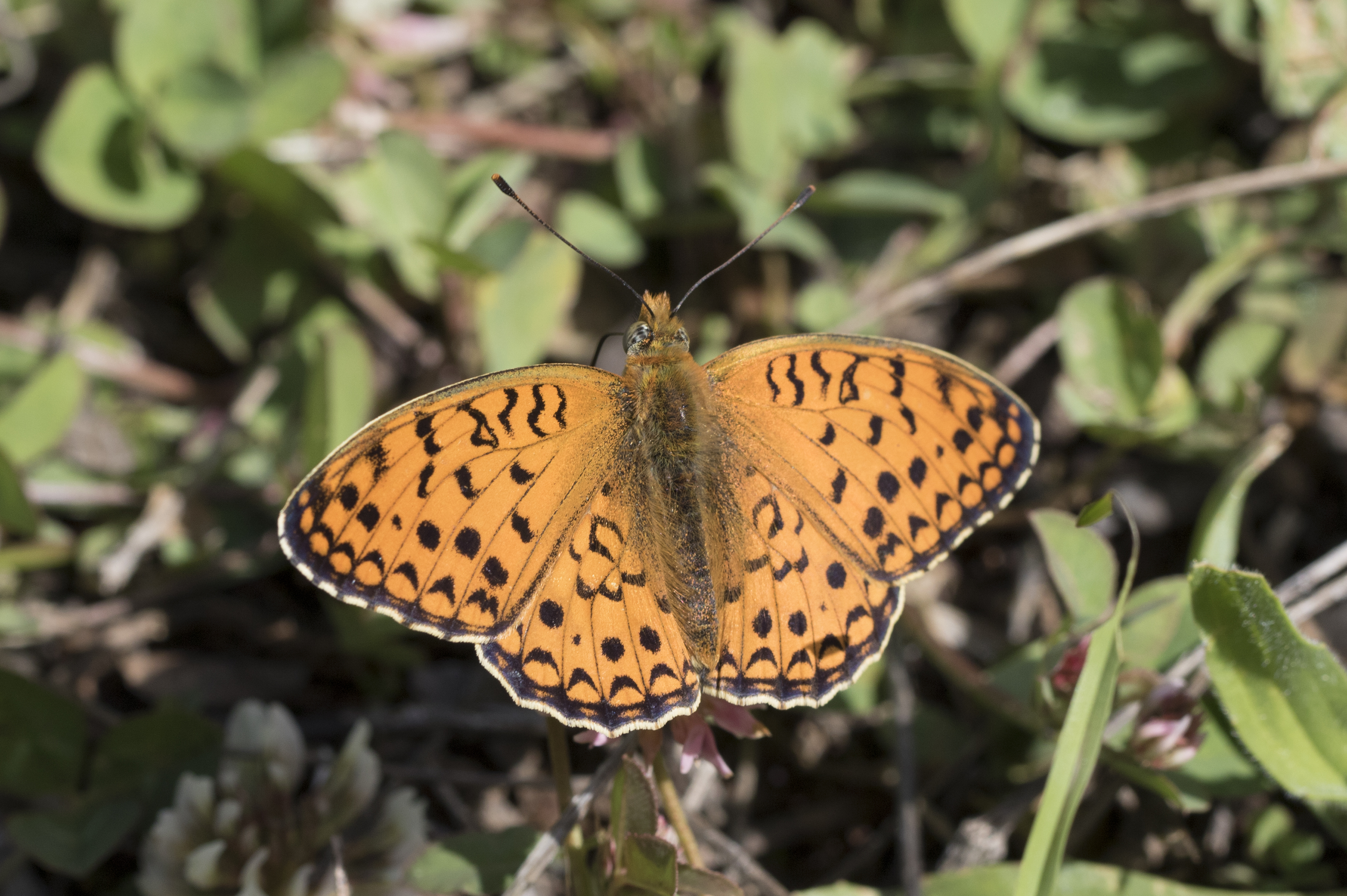

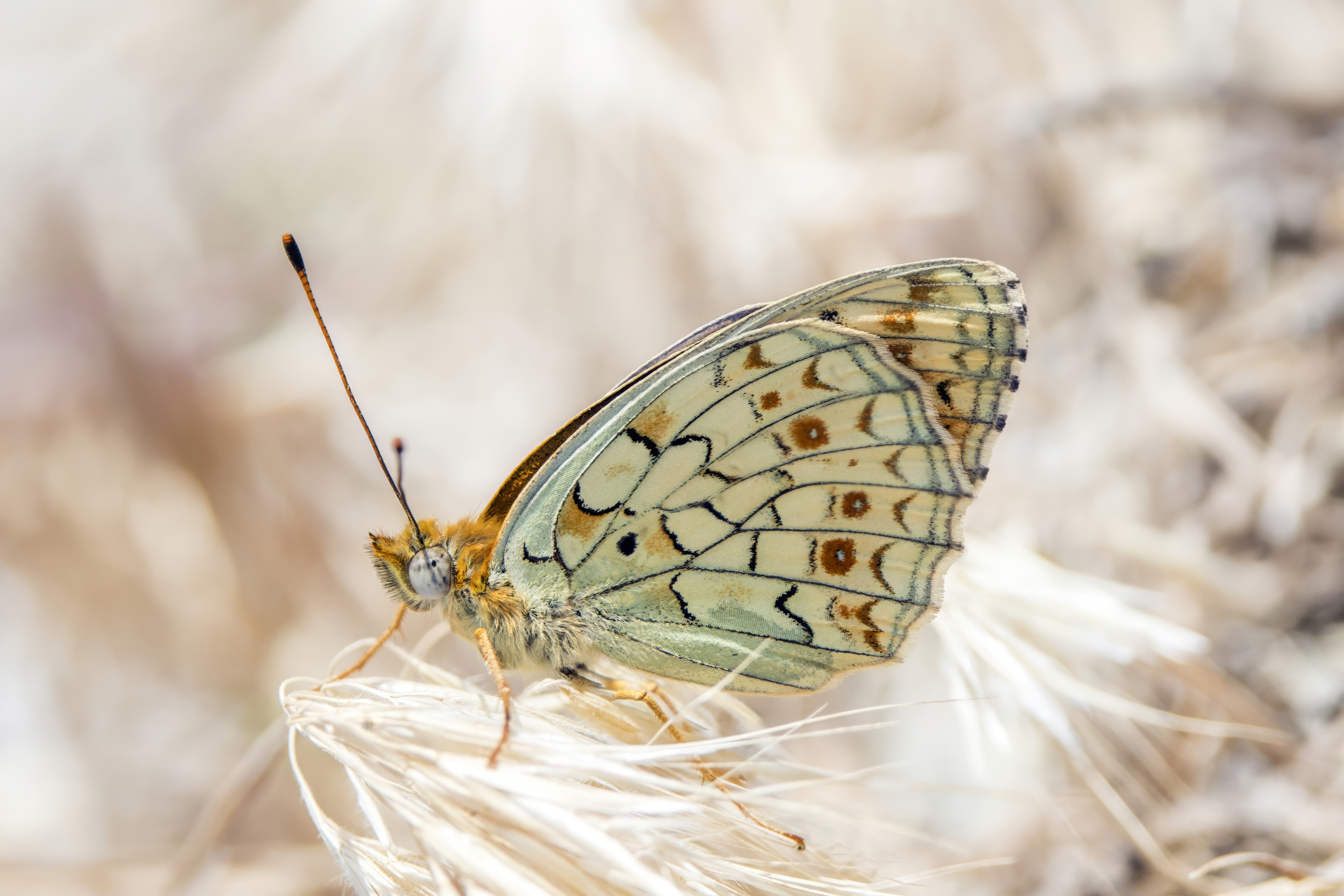

Scientific classification
- Kingdom: Animalia
- Phylum: Arthropoda
- Clade: Pancrustacea
- Class: Insecta
- Order: Lepidoptera
- Family: Nymphalidae
- Genus: Fabriciana
- Species: F. niobe

Binomial name
- Fabriciana niobe (Linnaeus, 1758)

Synonyms
- Papilio niobe Linnaeus, 1758; Argynnis niobe (Linnaeus, 1758); Argynnis eris Meigen, 1829

= Niobe fritillary =

Species of butterfly

The Niobe fritillary (Fabriciana niobe) is a species of butterfly in the family Nymphalidae.

== Etymology ==
The Latin species name niobe refers to Niobe, daughter of Tantalus in Greek mythology.

== Subspecies ==
Subspecies include:

- F. n. niobe (central Europe and Western Siberia)
- F. n. changaica Reuss, 1922
- F. n. demavendis (Gross & Ebert, 1975) (Iran)
- F. n. gigantea (Staudinger, 1871) (southern Europe)
- F. n. intermedia Reuss, 1925
- F. n. khusestana (Gross & Ebert, 1975) (western Iran)
- F. n. kurana (Wyatt & Omoto, 1966)
- F. n. orientalis (Alphéraky, 1881)
- F. n. ornata (Staudinger, 1901)
- F. n. shiva (Wyatt & Omoto, 1966)
- F. n. tekkensis (Christoph, 1893)
- F. n. valesinoides Reuss, 1926 (Korea)
- F. n. voraxides Reuss, 1921

== Distribution and habitat ==
Fabriciana niobe is common throughout Europe, but absent from the United Kingdom and Northern Europe, and is also found in Siberia, Russia, Iran, China, and Korea These butterflies can be found in open grassy places, slopes, woodland and clearings at altitudes between sea level and 2,400 metres (7,900 ft).

== Description ==
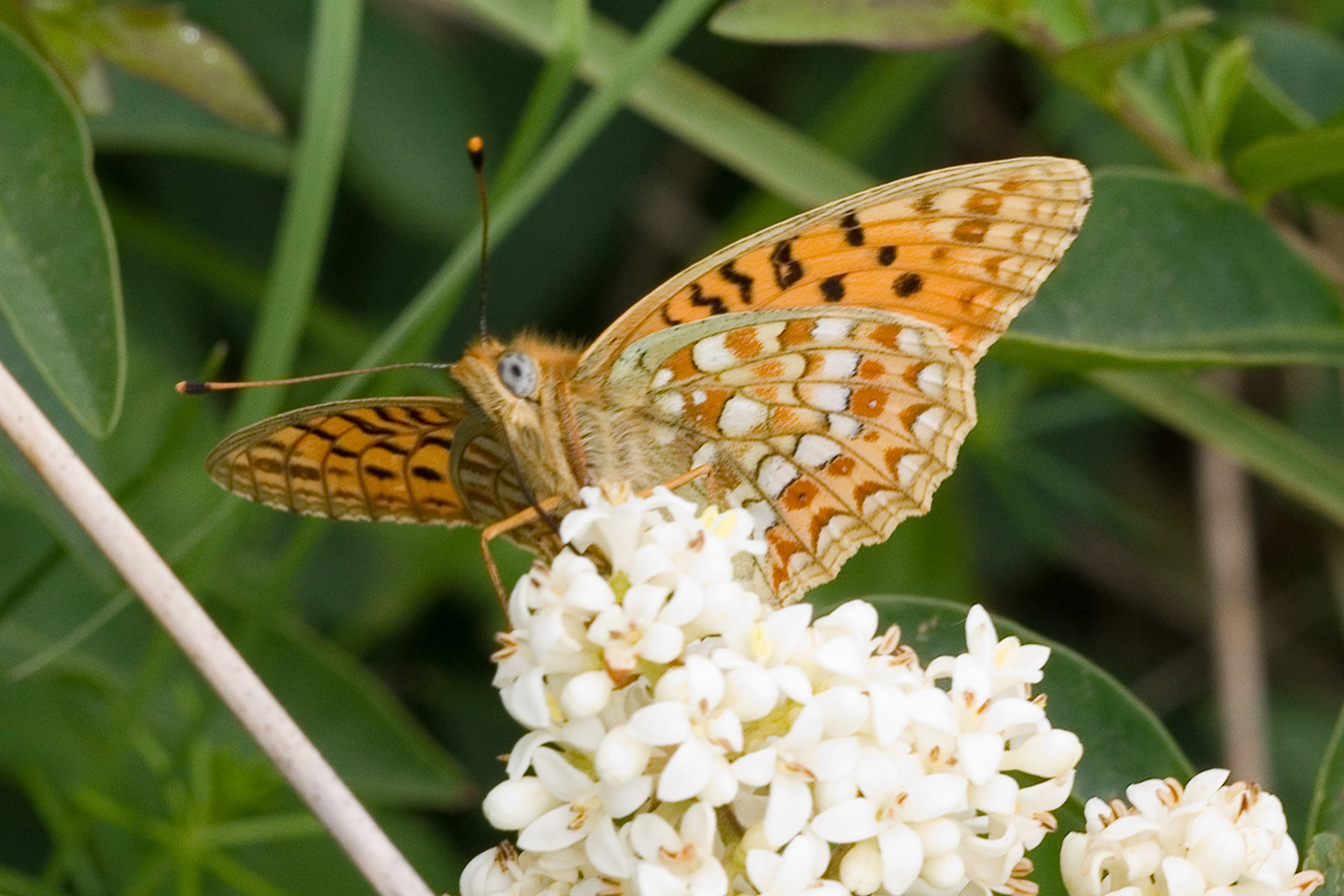
Niobe fritillary

Fabriciana niobe has a wingspan of 46–60 millimetres (1.8–2.4 in). The females are rather bigger and have more marked wings. These medium-sized butterflies have a bright brown-orange background with black dots and crossbands, and a line of submarginal triangular patches. The forewings margin shows a rounded shape. The underside of the hindwings usually has small whitish-silvery spots, a black pupilled yellow spot and black lined submarginal lunules and veins in the basal area. Caterpillars have a dark basic colour with small, white spots and white thorns.

This species is rather similar to the dark-green fritillary (Speyeria aglaja) and high brown fritillary (Fabriciana adippe), but it is quite smaller, the silver centred brown spots are smaller and the postdiscal silver markings are not continuous.

Seitz - A. niobe L. (69c). Above very similar to aglaja, at once recognized by the much more variegated under-side. The hindwing beneath is without the even verdigris shading in the basal half, the latter bearing distinct leathery-yellow patches, which are often centred, edged or shaded with brownish green. The nymotypical form has abundant silver-spots beneath, more than aglaja, as the distal band has no silver in aglaja, while it bears silvery centres in niobe.

== Biology ==
This species is univoltine. It overwinters at the caterpillar stage in the egg shell. Adults fly from May to late August. The eggs are laid on the vegetation, near the host plants. The larvae hatch in March and mature in June. Caterpillars feed on Viola tricolor, Viola canina, Viola riviniana, Viola odorata, Viola hirta, Viola palustris and Plantago lanceolata.

== Gallery ==
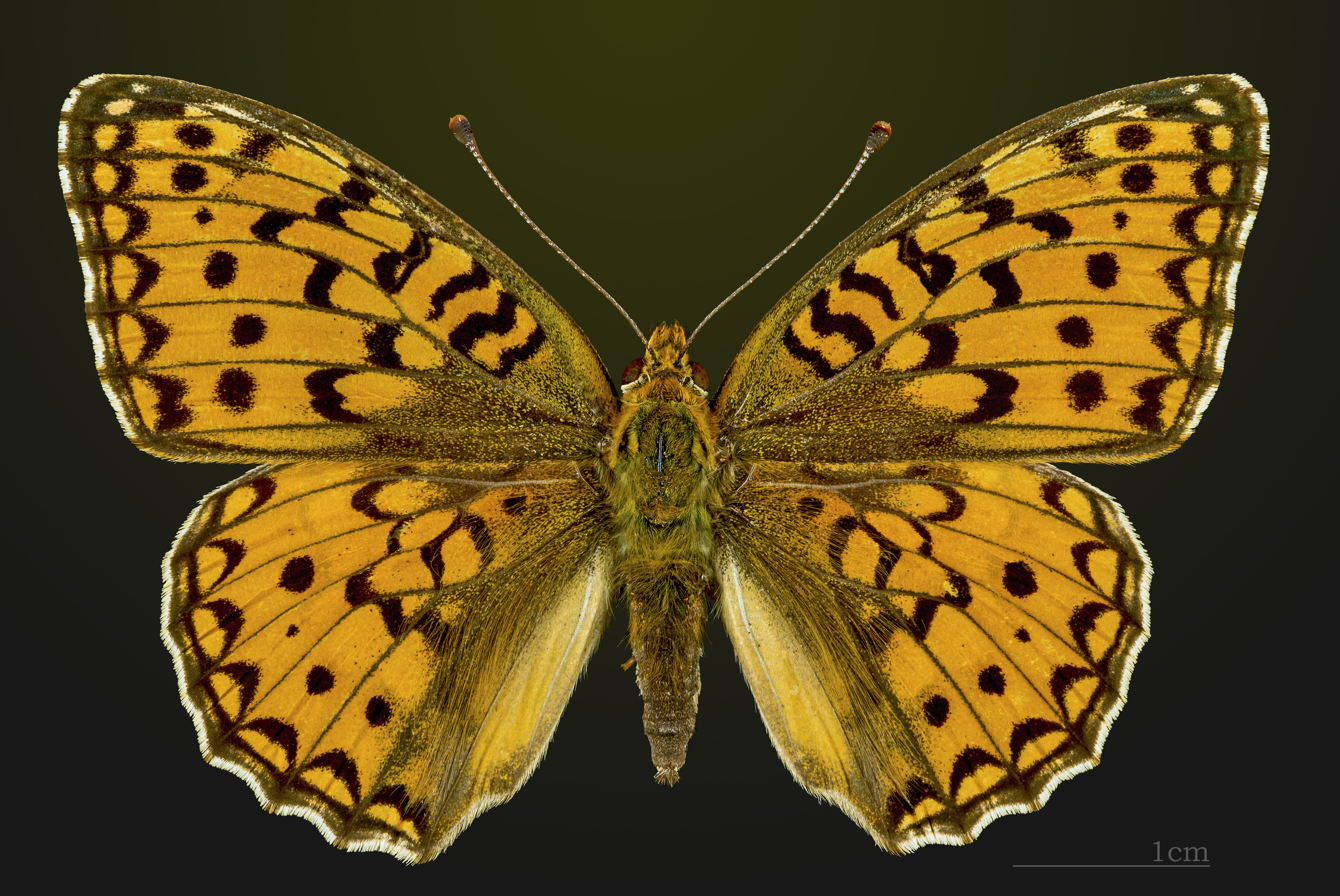
Dorsal view

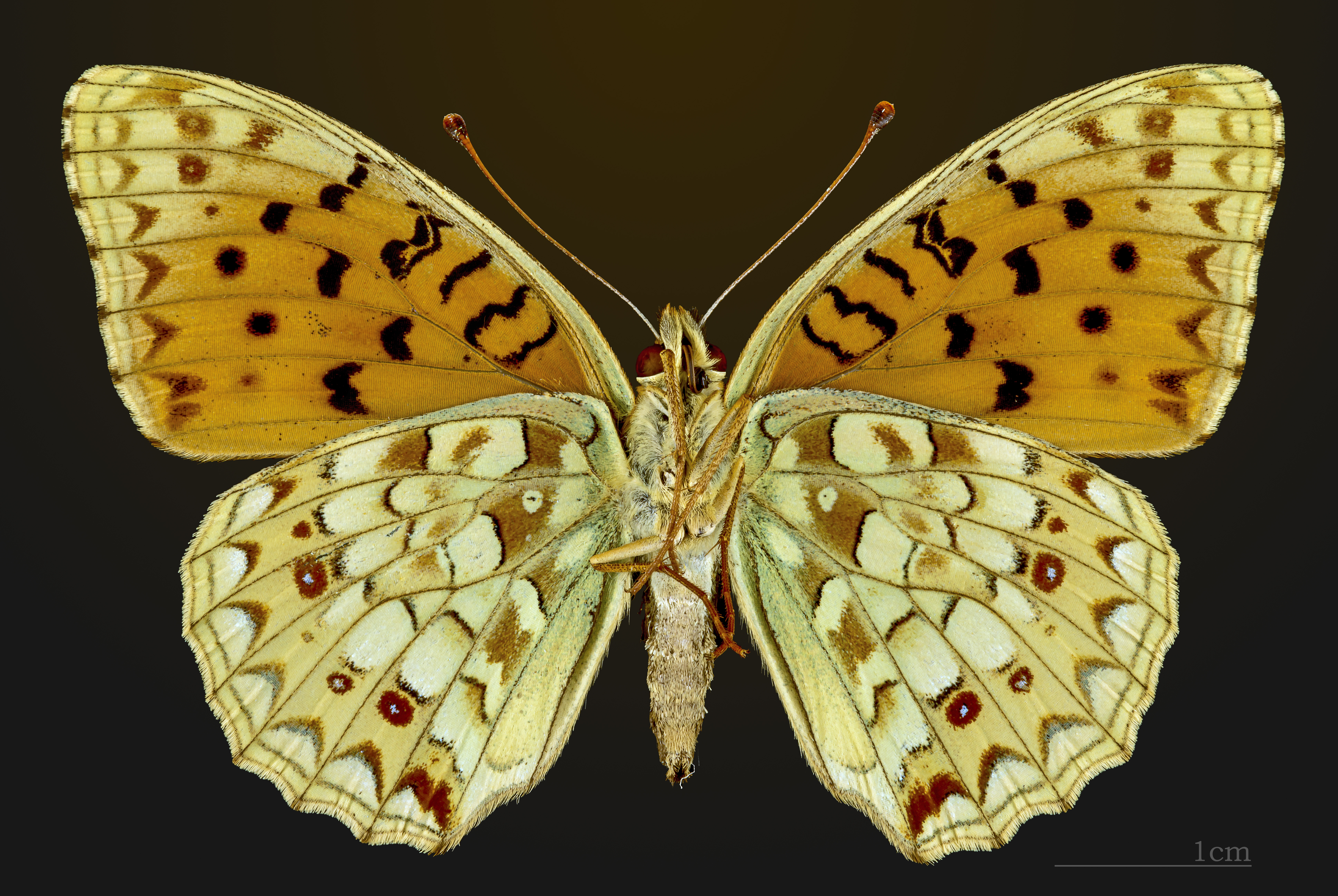
Ventral view

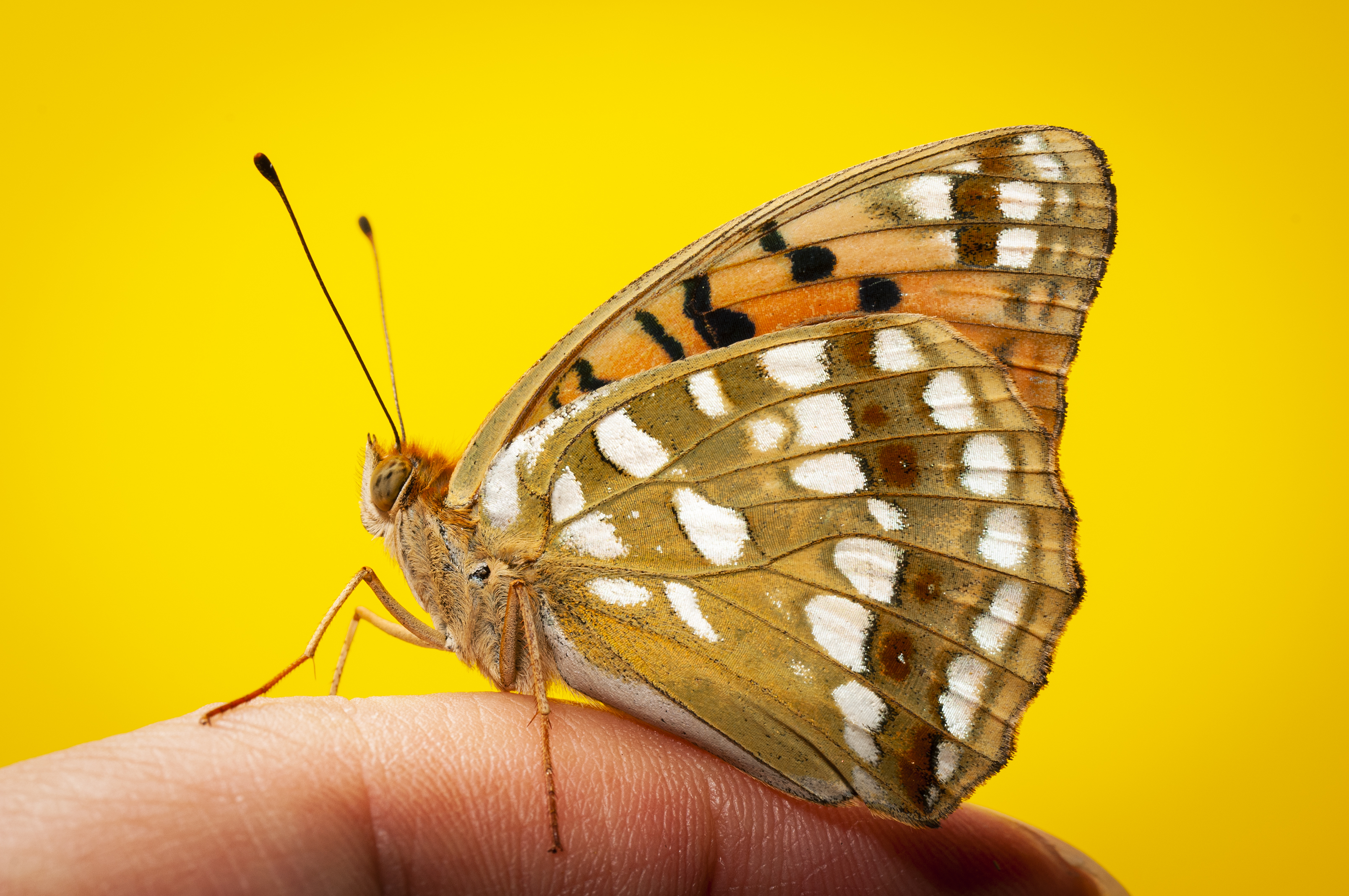
Argynnis niobe, Adult, South Korea

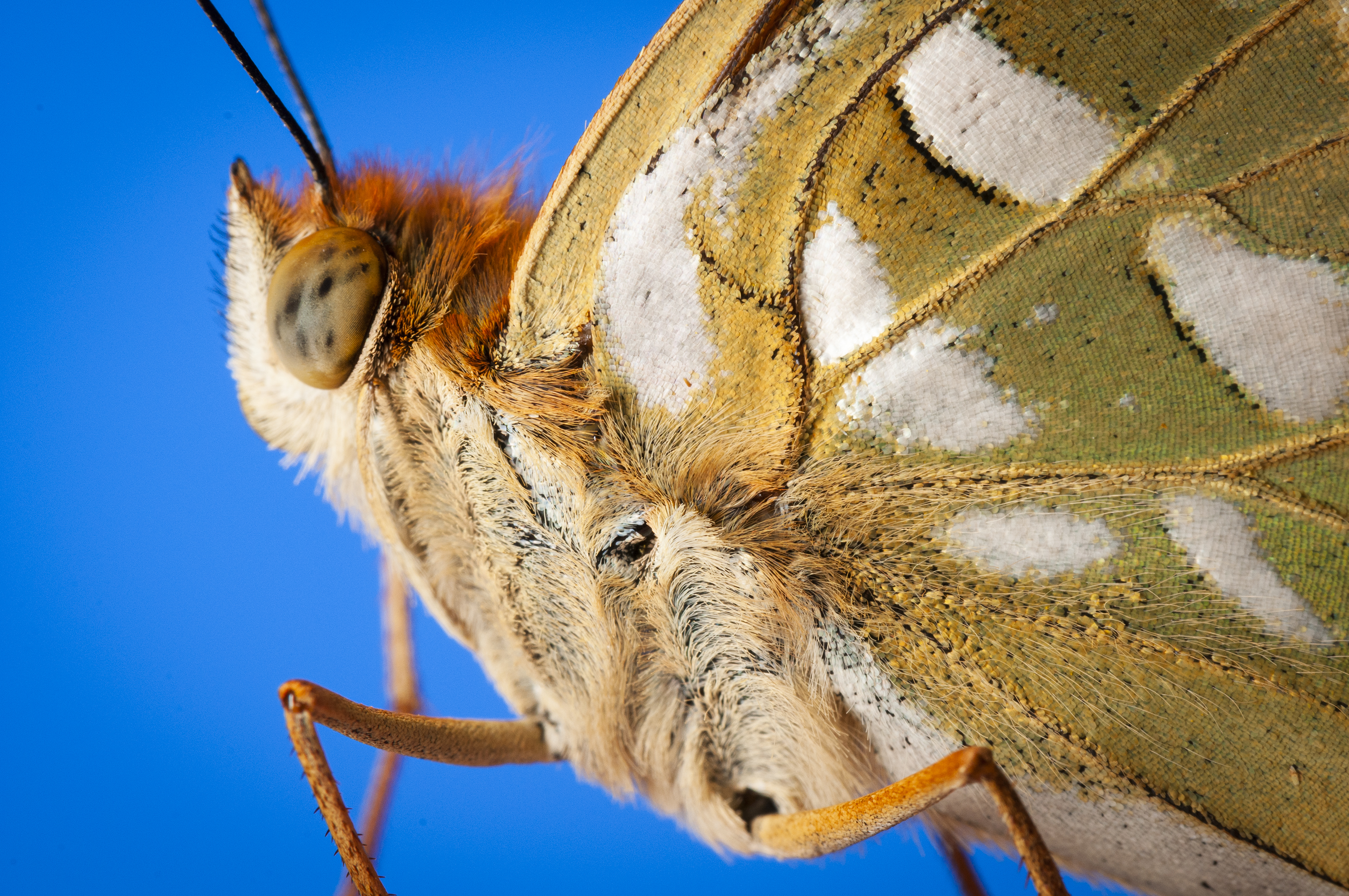
Argynnis niobe, Macro, Adult, South Korea
