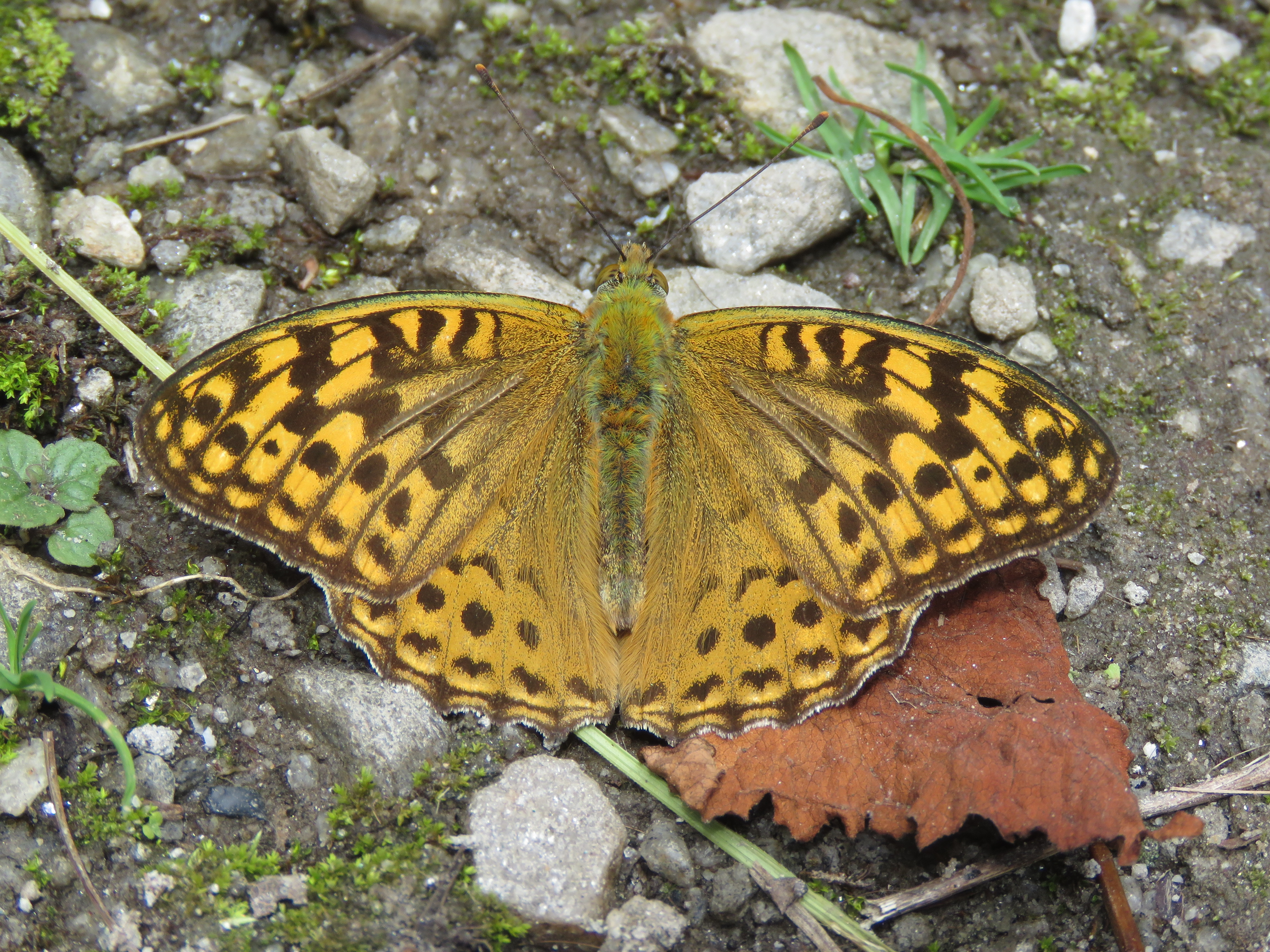
- Fabriciana kamala male in the Valley of Flowers National Park, Uttarakhand, India.

Scientific classification
- Domain: Eukaryota
- Kingdom: Animalia
- Phylum: Arthropoda
- Class: Insecta
- Order: Lepidoptera
- Family: Nymphalidae
- Genus: Fabriciana
- Species: F. kamala

Binomial name
- Fabriciana kamala (Moore), 1857

Synonyms
- Argynnis kamala Moore, 1857; Argynnis cnidia C. & R. Felder, [1867]

= Fabriciana kamala =

Species of butterfly

Fabriciana kamala, the kamala fritillary, is a butterfly of the family Nymphalidae. It has an eastern range in the Palearctic realm – the Himalayas, Tibet, Kashmir and Kashmir - northwest India, Spīn Ghar, Chitral to Kumaon. The species was first described by Frederic Moore in 1857.
