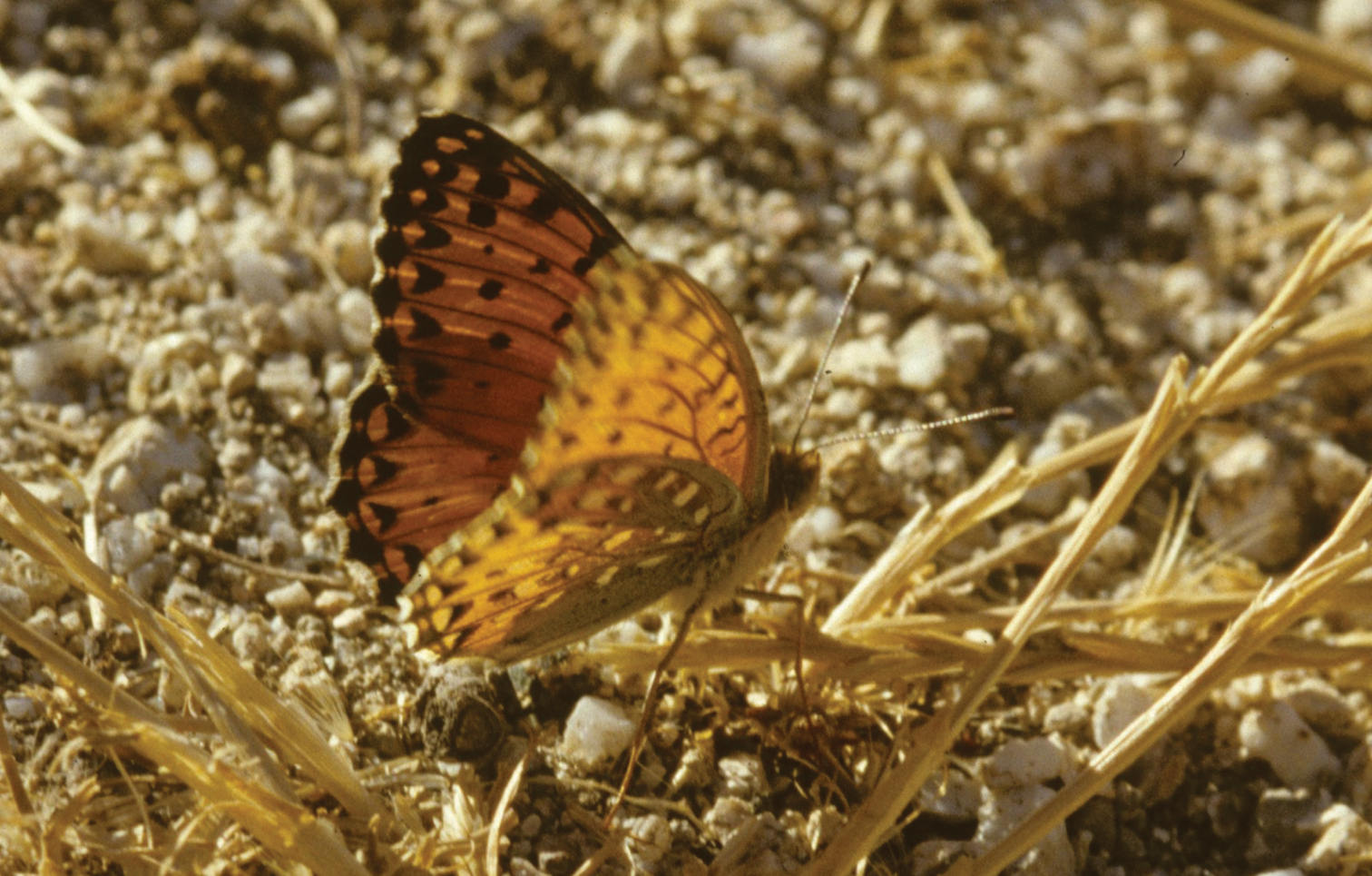

Scientific classification
- Kingdom: Animalia
- Phylum: Arthropoda
- Clade: Pancrustacea
- Class: Insecta
- Order: Lepidoptera
- Family: Nymphalidae
- Genus: Fabriciana
- Species: F. elisa

Binomial name
- Fabriciana elisa (Godart, [1824])

Synonyms
- Argynnis elisa Godart, [1824]

= Fabriciana elisa =

Species of butterfly

Fabriciana elisa, the Corsican fritillary, is a butterfly of the family Nymphalidae. It is found in Corsica and Sardinia. It is a mountain butterfly, found on grassy vegetation in clearings in deciduous woods.

== Description in Seitz ==
The wingspan is 45–60 mm. A. elisa Godt. (= cyrene Bon., eliza Lang) (69b). The same size as clara, but distinctly a transition to aglaja. Rather variable, above fiery brown-red to light orange-yellow, the black markings rather small and at the distal margin almost obsolete. The hindwing beneath entirely dusted over with green, sometimes a small patch before the distal margin excepted; the silver-spots numerous but small, angular, sometimes reduced to heavy dots or comma-spots, the central ones having usually a dark edge. — The species is restricted to the mountains of Corsica and Sardinia, where it is locally abundant in June and July, for instance on the Monte Gennargentu near Lanusei.

== Biology ==
Adults are on wing from July to August. The larvae feed on Viola species, including Viola tricolor, Viola biflora, Viola reichenbachiana and Viola corsica. They prefer plants growing under juniper bushes.
