= Fabriciana xipe =

- Argynnis adippe var. coredippe = Fabriciana xipe (Grum-Grshimailo, 1891) 3 male, 4 female in Leech, J. H., 1892–1893. Butterflies from China, Japan and Corea 3

Scientific classification
- Kingdom: Animalia
- Phylum: Arthropoda
- Clade: Pancrustacea
- Class: Insecta
- Order: Lepidoptera
- Family: Nymphalidae
- Genus: Fabriciana
- Species: F. xipe

Binomial name
- Fabriciana xipe (Grum-Grshimailo, 1891)

Species of butterfly

Fabriciana xipe is an East Palearctic butterfly in the family Nymphalidae (Heliconiinae).

It is found in Altai - Ussuri, China, Mongolia and Korea. The habitat is steppe. They fly in July and August.
