= Fabriciana nerippe coreana =

Scientific classification
- Kingdom: Animalia
- Phylum: Arthropoda
- Clade: Pancrustacea
- Class: Insecta
- Order: Lepidoptera
- Family: Nymphalidae
- Genus: Fabriciana
- Species: F. nerippe
- Subspecies: F. n. coreana

Trinomial name
- Fabriciana nerippe coreana (Butler, 1882)

Synonyms
- Argynnis coreana Butler, 1882; Fabriciana coreana (Butler, 1882); Argynnis adippe numerica Matsumura, 1929; Argynnis adippe non-argentata Matsumura, 1929; Argynnis adippe flavescens Matsumura, 1929

Subspecies of butterfly

Fabriciana nerippe coreana is a butterfly found in the East Palearctic (Amur, Ussuri, China, Korea, Japan) that belongs to the Nymphalidae family.

== Taxonomy ==
Depending on authors, this taxon is either regarded as a subspecies of Fabriciana nerippe or as a distinct species (in which case it is called Fabriciana coreana or Argynnis coreana).

== Description from Seitz ==
In the form [ of A nerippe Fldr] coreana Btlr., from Corea, the upperside is pale yellow and the black markings are thin and sparse, the spots smaller and often obsolescent. — coredippe Leech (70a) [synonym] is the cleodoxa -form of the large East- Asiatic vorax; as in cleodoxa the silver is replaced with pale yellow, but the spots are more prominent than in the European form on account of the greenish dusting of the ground between them; Manchuria, Shantung, Corea.

== See also ==
- List of butterflies of Russia
