= Fabriciana vorax =

- Argynnis adippe var. vorax in Leech, J. H., 1892–1893. Butterflies from China, Japan and Corea 3

Scientific classification
- Kingdom: Animalia
- Phylum: Arthropoda
- Clade: Pancrustacea
- Class: Insecta
- Order: Lepidoptera
- Family: Nymphalidae
- Genus: Fabriciana
- Species: F. vorax

Binomial name
- Fabriciana vorax (Butler, 1871)

Species of butterfly

Fabriciana vorax is an East Palearctic butterfly in the family Nymphalidae (Heliconiinae).

It is found in Japan, Korea, Northeast and Central China, Southeast Tibet, Sakhalin, and Ussur.
