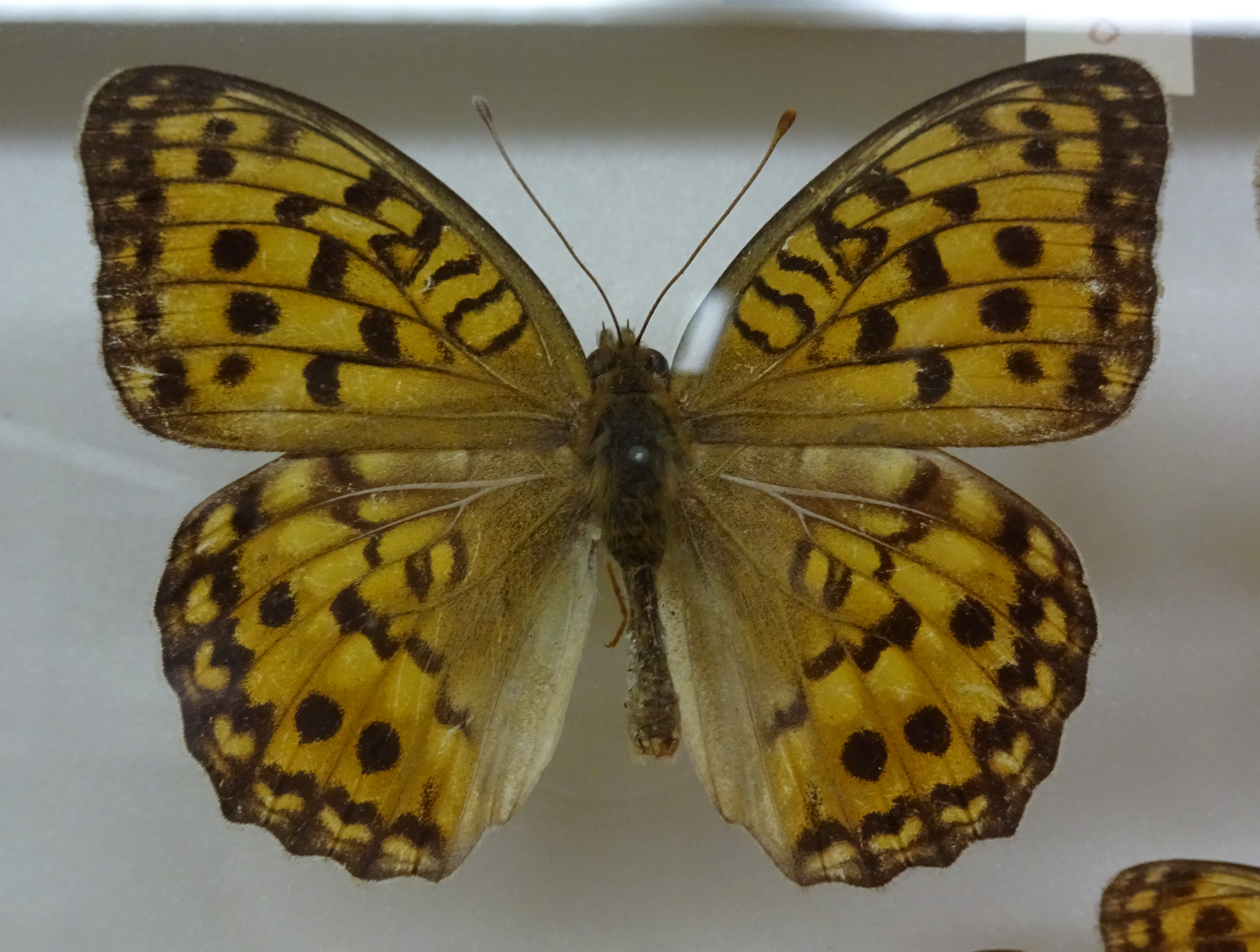

Scientific classification
- Kingdom: Animalia
- Phylum: Arthropoda
- Clade: Pancrustacea
- Class: Insecta
- Order: Lepidoptera
- Family: Nymphalidae
- Genus: Fabriciana
- Species: F. nerippe

Binomial name
- Fabriciana nerippe (C. & R. Felder, 1862)

Synonyms
- Argynnis nerippe C. & R. Felder, 1862

= Fabriciana nerippe =

Species of butterfly

Fabriciana nerippe is an East Palearctic butterfly in the family Nymphalidae (Heliconiinae). It is found in Japan, Korea, China, and Tibet.

== Subspecies ==
Listed chronologically:

- F. n. nerippe – Japan
- F. n. coreana (Butler, 1882) (often treated as a distinct species) – Amur, Ussuri, China, Korea, Japan
- F. n. nerippina (Fruhstorfer, 1907) – Tibet
- F. n. mumon (Matsumura, 1929) – Ussuri
