= Fabriciana argyrospilata =

Scientific classification
- Domain: Eukaryota
- Kingdom: Animalia
- Phylum: Arthropoda
- Class: Insecta
- Order: Lepidoptera
- Family: Nymphalidae
- Genus: Fabriciana
- Species: F. argyrospilata

Binomial name
- Fabriciana argyrospilata (Kotzsch, 1938)

Synonyms
- Argynnis argyrospilata Kotzsch, 1938

Species of butterfly

Fabriciana argyrospilata is a species of butterfly of the family Nymphalidae. It has an eastern range in the Palearctic realm – Afghanistan, the western Pamirs, Pakistan, and northwest India. The species was first described by Hans Kotzsch in 1938.
