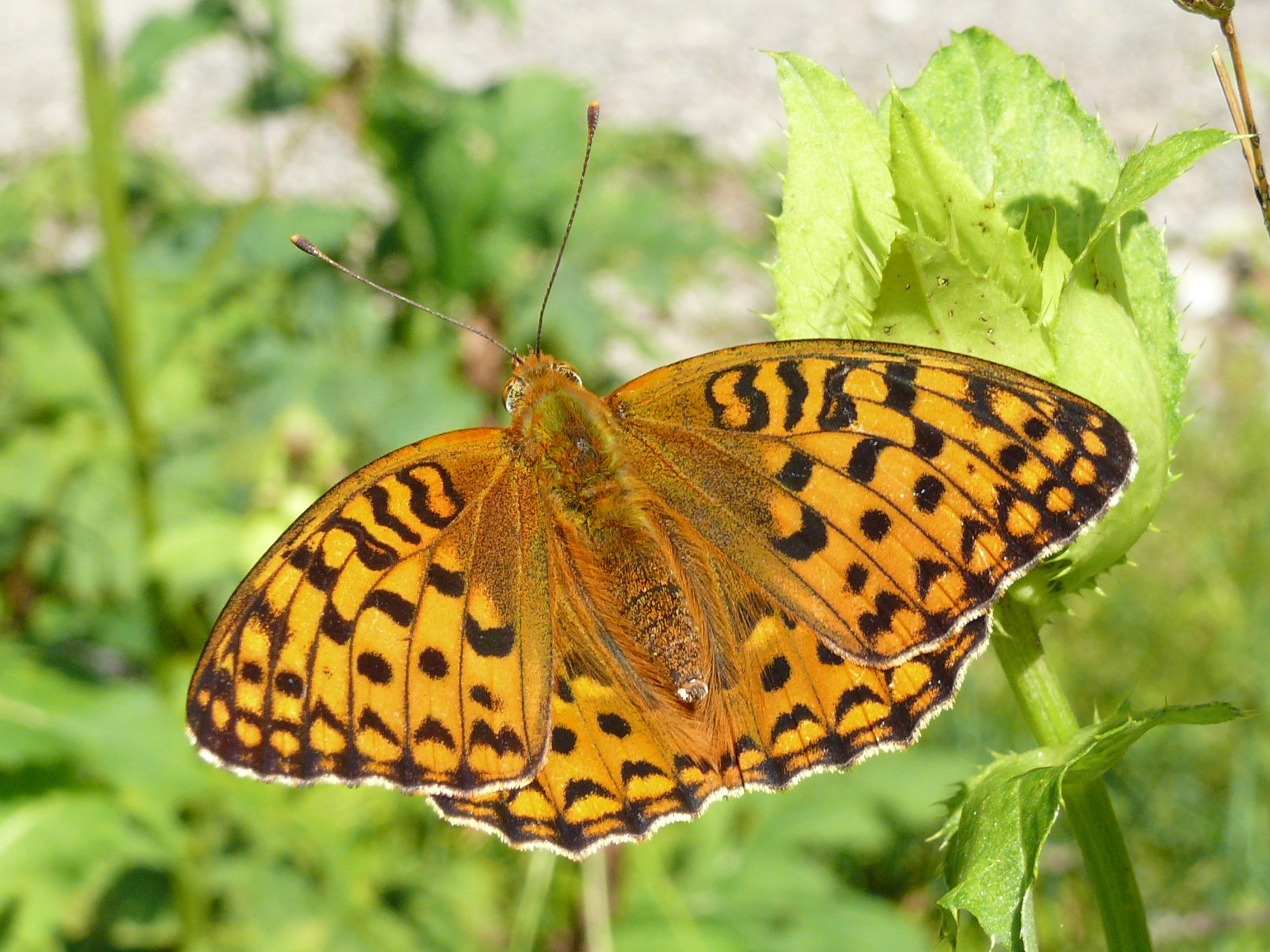
- Dorsal side, Germany
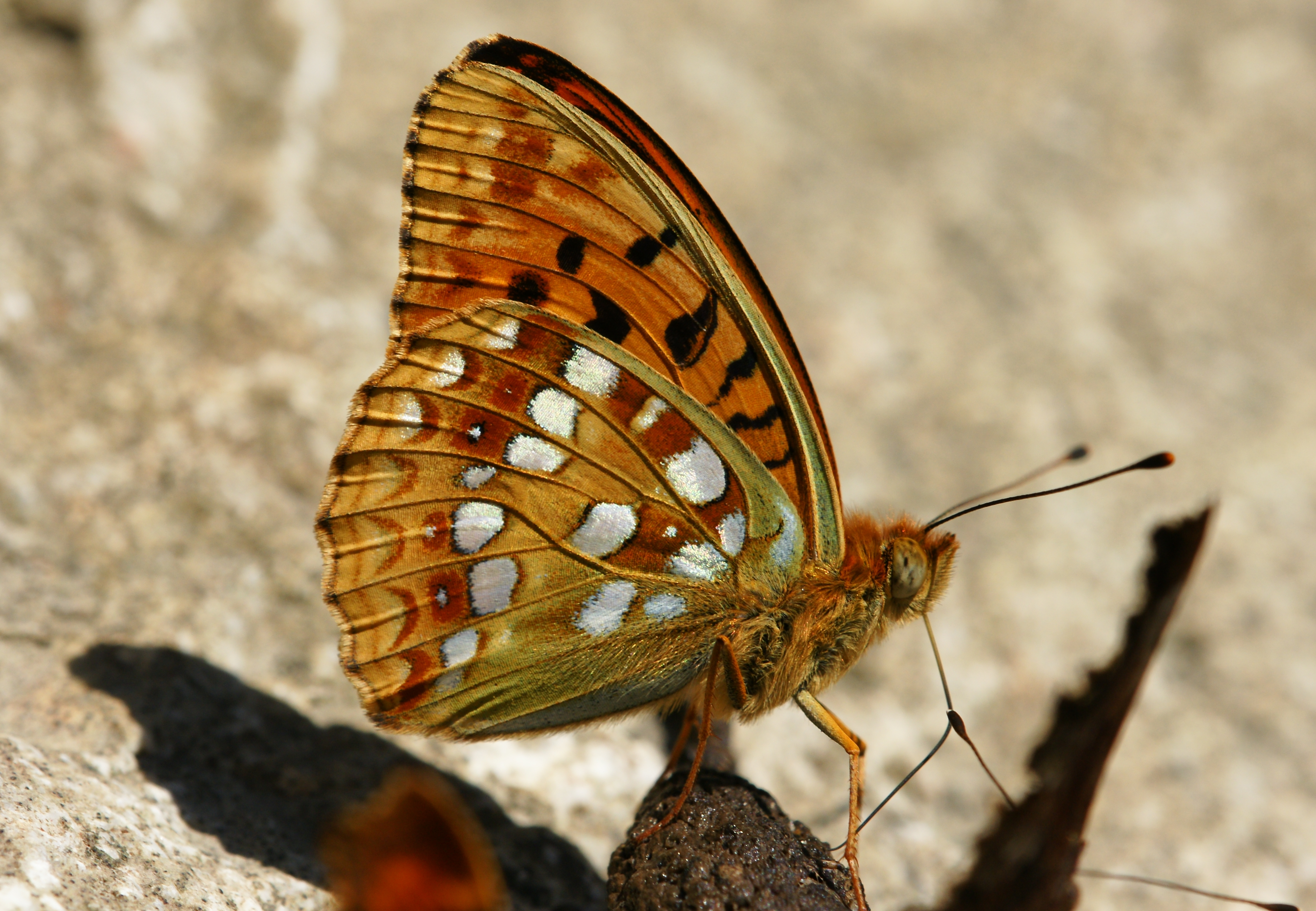
- Ventral side, Austria

Scientific classification
- Kingdom: Animalia
- Phylum: Arthropoda
- Clade: Pancrustacea
- Class: Insecta
- Order: Lepidoptera
- Family: Nymphalidae
- Genus: Fabriciana
- Species: F. adippe

Binomial name
- Fabriciana adippe (Denis & Schiffermüller, 1775)

Synonyms
- Papilio adippe Denis & Schiffermüller, 1775; Argynnis adippe

= High brown fritillary =

Species of butterfly

The high brown fritillary (Fabriciana adippe) is a large and brightly colored butterfly of the family Nymphalidae, native to Europe and across the Palearctic to Japan. It is known for being Great Britain's most threatened butterfly and is listed as a vulnerable species under the Wildlife and Countryside Act 1981. Like other fritillaries it is dependent on warm climates with violet-rich flora.

== Description ==
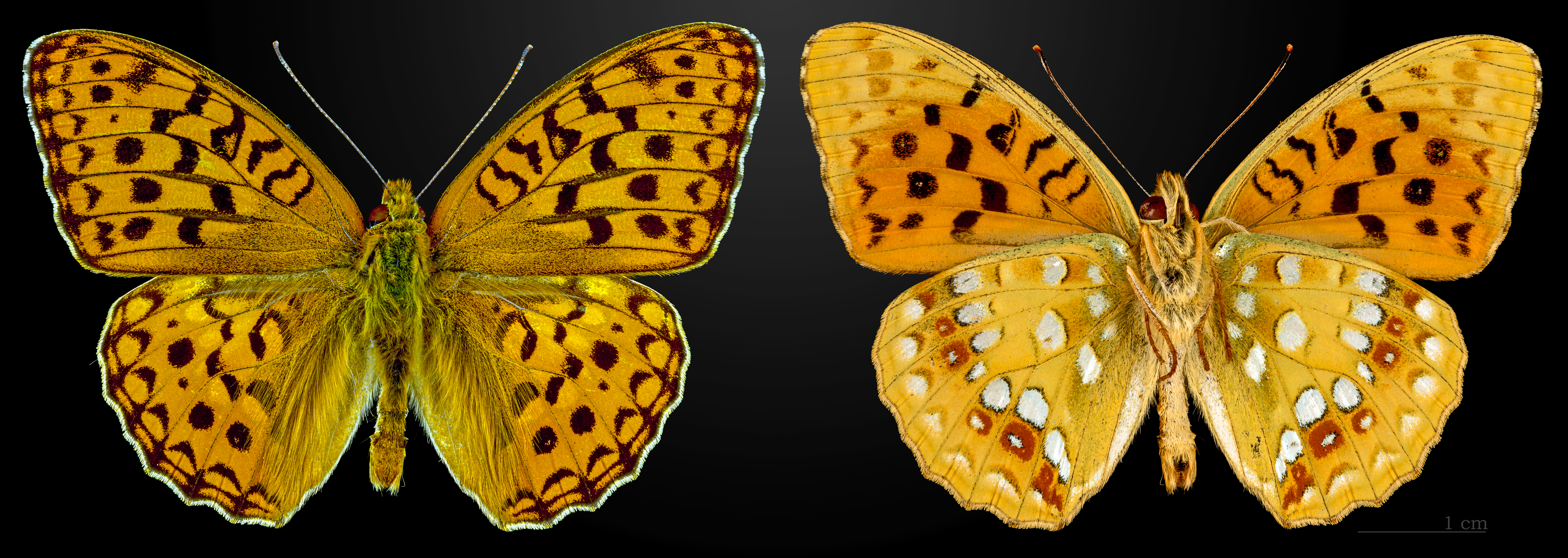
dorsal (L) and ventral (R) views

The high brown fritillary's wingspan is on average around 65 mm. Its upper wings are orange with black markings and the undersides are colored a duller orange with white and brown markings. While flying, it is very hard to distinguish from the dark green fritillary which has many of the same markings. The male and female fritillary share many of the same physical features.

Larvae are brown with a single longitudinal white stripe down the length of their body. Their bodies are covered in brown spikes which aid in camouflaging them from predators as they move among dead fern fronds.

=== Description from Seitz ===
A. adippe L. (= berecynthia Poda, cydippe L.) (69d). Usually larger than the previous species [ Argynnis alexandra Ménetries, 1832], the wings more obtuse, the outer margin of the forewing quite straight and that of the hindwing feebly undulate in the female. Easily recognized by the thickened hairy streaks placed in the male on the branches of the median vein on the forewing. Beneath the silver-spots are much larger than in niobe, particularly the marginal spots are much longer and broader.

== Geographic range ==
This butterfly has many subspecies that span across Europe and throughout Asia and Africa, given that there are temperate temperatures in those regions. Northern Europe has seen a severe decline in fritillary population but it is still relatively abundant in other parts of Europe.

As of 2015, the high brown fritillary was the most threatened British butterfly species. It continues to be regarded as Britain's most threatened butterfly, having been reduced to around 50 sites since the 1970s. On the 2022 Red List of British butterflies it is classified as Endangered. Populations remain in four areas in Great Britain. The Morecambe Bay Limestone hills, the Glamorgan Brackenlands, Dartmoor and Exmoor all support a fritillary population, while it has declined in most other Northern European regions.

== Habitat ==
There are two main habitats that support high brown fritillary populations: bracken and limestone outcrops. Bracken habitats are found across its geographic range but limestone outcrops are specific to Great Britain.

=== Bracken habitats ===
These habitats are usually at lower altitudes in open fields and are found across the fritillarys complete range, usually facing in a southern direction. Their flora is not very diverse, and is limited to common ivies, tormentil, wood anemone and violets. Breeding areas are bracken dominated, with dead bracken leaves littering the ground. Grassy areas often intersperse these habitats.

In spring, habitat covered in dead bracken typically also has less dense grass cover, allowing the temperature in these areas to be significantly higher than surrounding areas. Increased temperature allows larvae to mature more quickly here, making bracken-rich habitats favorable breeding sites.

=== Limestone outcropping habitats ===
These habitats are specific to Great Britain, especially to the limestone soils of the Morecambe Bay. These outcrops are usually created by human intervention and land management. Breeding persists on limestone soil or near bracken. Throughout the rest of Great Britain, populations are restricted to thick Bracken clumps.

== Food resources ==
=== Larvae ===
Unlike other species, fritillary larvae ignore their egg shells as a food source and instead primarily feed on violet seedlings. They focus on younger growth and remain among food plants, eating heavily before metamorphosis.

=== Adult ===
Adult fritillaries do not have a very diverse set of plants from which they feed. Both the female and male feed primary on bramble blossom and common knapweed. Fritillaries have also been observed feeding on different thistle species, betony, and ragwort. Local gardens are also commonly frequented as Buddleja is a popular choice among fritillaries as well.

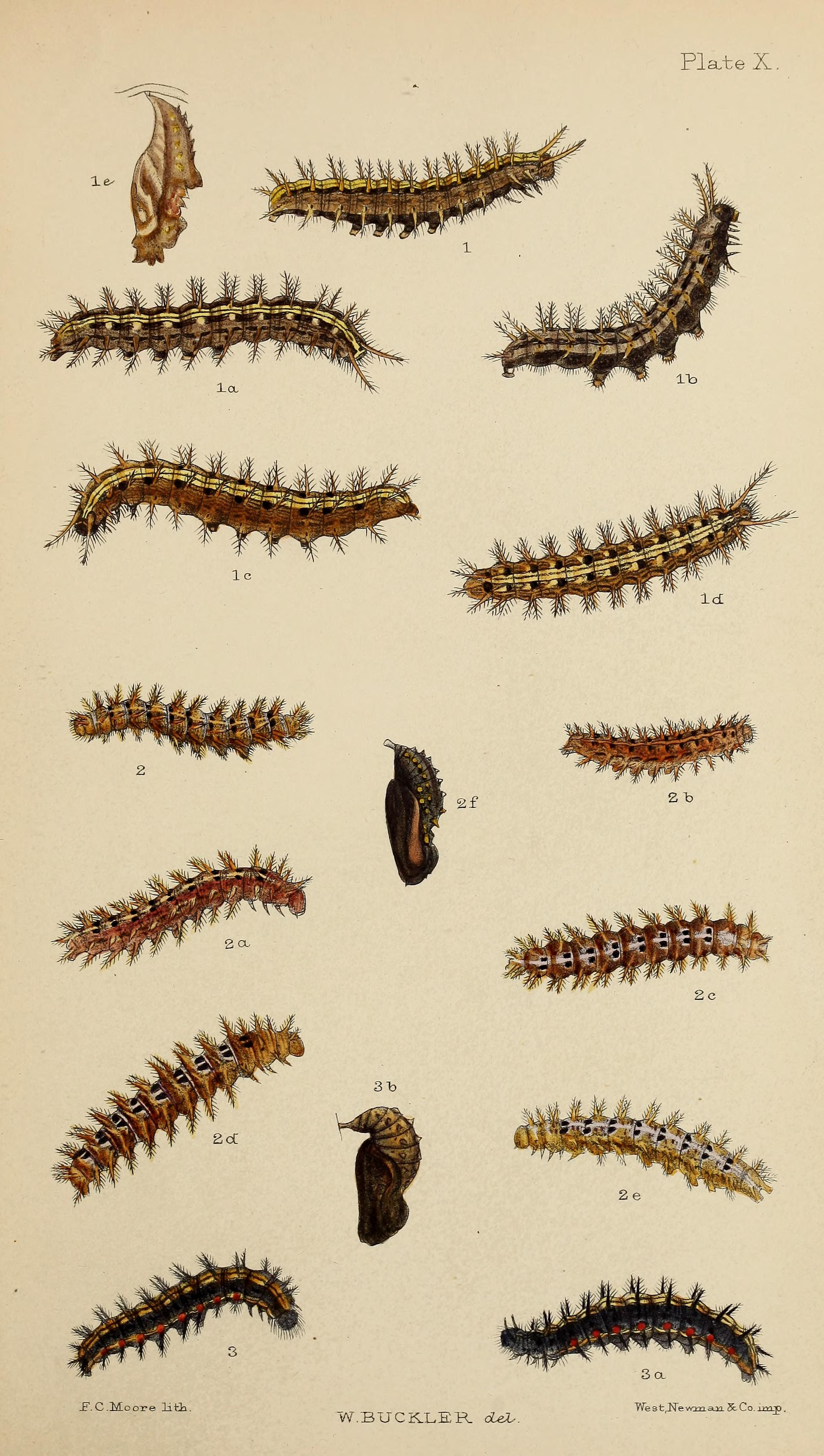
2,2a,2b, 2c, 2d, 2e larva after last moult 2f pupa

== Life cycle ==
=== Egg ===
Eggs are laid singly in mid-July up till winter's start, overwinter, and hatch in mid-March. Observation of fritillary egg laying is difficult as the eggs are very similar in color to the female's ovipositor. It has been seen that eggs may not even be laid after extensive enquiry by the female of potential egg sites. Females also prefer to lay eggs that are on firm ground rather than ground with loose plant matter. In outcrops eggs are laid in short vegetation next to limestone that offers good moss cover. In Bracken eggs are laid in groups in the midst of thick Bracken clumps. Dead Bracken litter is a popular site for egg laying, as well as moss and other decaying vegetation.

=== Larvae ===
Once the larvae of the high brown fritillary emerge from the shell in mid-March, they begin to feed, usually on violets, almost immediately. When not feeding, which it spends the majority of its time doing, the larvae hide themselves among vegetation. They are diurnal and very temperature dependent. They frequently bask in sunlight to raise their body temperature higher than the surrounding vegetation allowing for faster growth. Eggs are laid in spots conducive to sun bathing, and the larvae gravitate towards spots warmed by sun and vegetation. During abnormally high temperatures the larvae hide under plant matter in-between feeding.

=== Pupa ===
Before pupation, the larvae form a shroud like structure from leaves and spin a section of silk from the top. This occurs usually around June. The larvae then suspend themselves and enter their pupal stage, which lasts for approximately a month, although this estimate is very temperature dependent. There is not extensive research on the subject.

=== Adult ===
The adult fritillary only has one brood a year, as they are a univoltine species. They can be seen flying from late June to late August, or even in certain Limestone areas, till September. Elsewhere they have a shorter flying season, from only mid-June to early August. In warm weather the fritillary is most active, and spends most of its time flying low to the ground above and around Bracken and other flora.

== Parental care ==
=== Oviposition ===
The egg laying process begins when a female does low passes above bracken fronds and drop down when they find a suitable spot. Females will then crawl on the bracken littered ground and use their abdomens to probe for likely egg laying spots. Eggs are normally laid once a female crawls over a plant that can serve as a food resource. Eggs may also be laid without any area observation, and without any food plants nearby, as females have been observed to lay eggs within seconds of landing. False egg laying is also common.

== Conservation ==
=== Current status ===
The high brown fritillary population, especially in Great Britain, is extremely threatened. It is extinct in over 90% of its former geographic range, making it a high priority for conservation efforts. The species was once widespread in the United Kingdom but has now greatly declined. It has legal protection in the UK under the 1981 Wildlife and Countryside Act. The British decline of the fritillary can be attributed to novel changes in land management, increasing during the 20th century.

=== Habitat loss ===
Fritillaries in woodland habitats have been most severally affected by habitat loss. These butterflies relied heavily on coppicing, a land managing technique that has all but disappeared from Great Britain's countryside. The reduction of coppicing combined with replanting and new forest growth has several limited the places the fritillary can thrive, as bracken habitats are becoming rarer. Within bracken habitats, population loss is driven when bracken growth is too extreme or grazing animals trample the flora associated with the butterfly.

=== Projects ===
In order to reverse the decline of the high brown fritillary, conservation plans focusing on bracken habitat management are the primary course of action. Bracken sites are in the process of being assessed to see which steps could be taken next. There are tentative plans to implement winter bracken litter clearance and summer path cutting between patches. The high brown fritillary remains one of the Butterfly Conservation's highest priority projects.

The Wilder Blean project, headed up by the Wildwood Trust and Kent Wildlife Trust, is introducing European bison to the UK for the first time in 6000 years. Their actions create open, light-flooded patches that encourage the growth of cow wheat which the fritillary depends upon. The herd of 3 females and 1 male will be set free in 2022 within a 2,500-acre conservation area in Blean Woods near Canterbury.

== Gallery ==
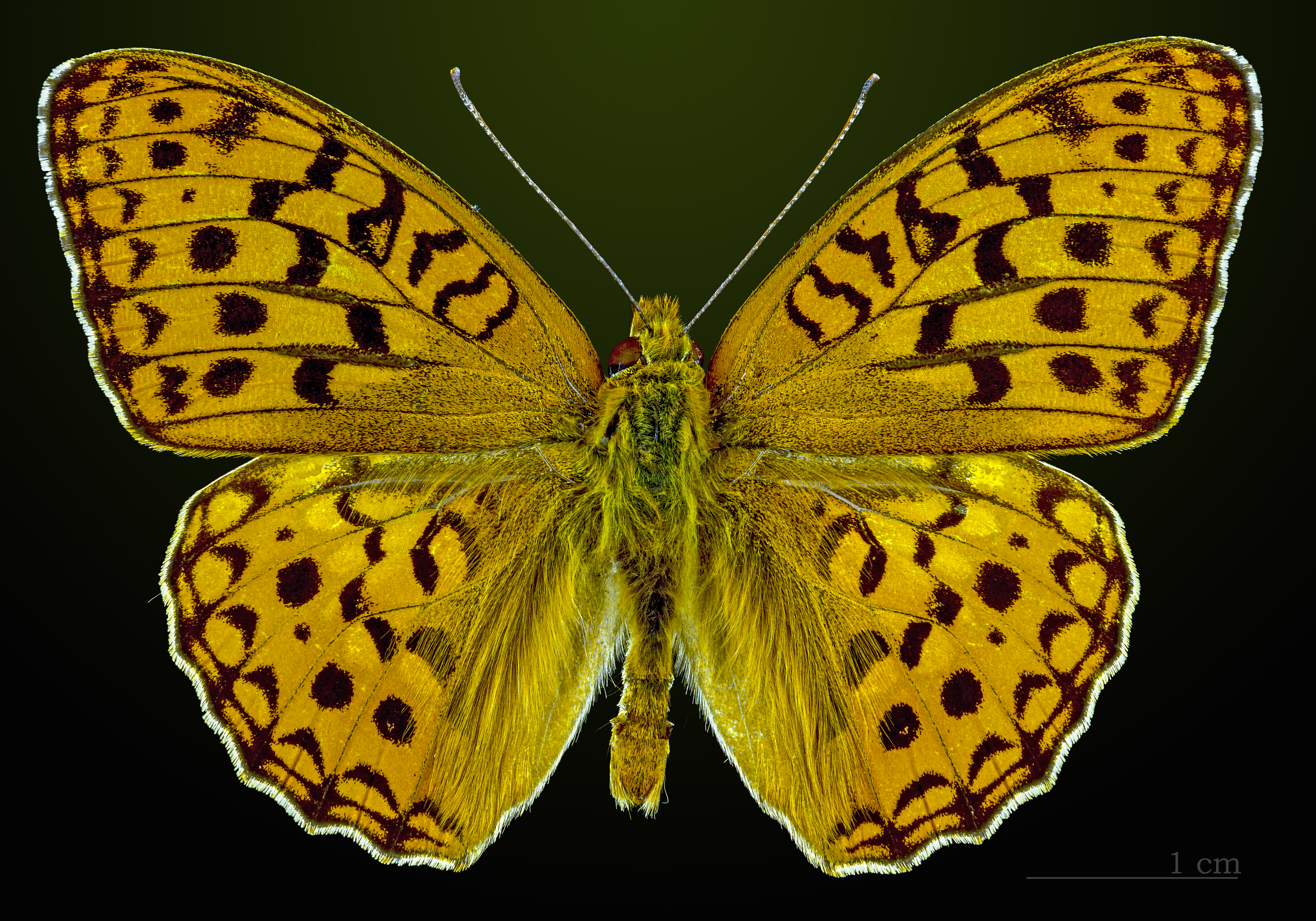
Dorsal side

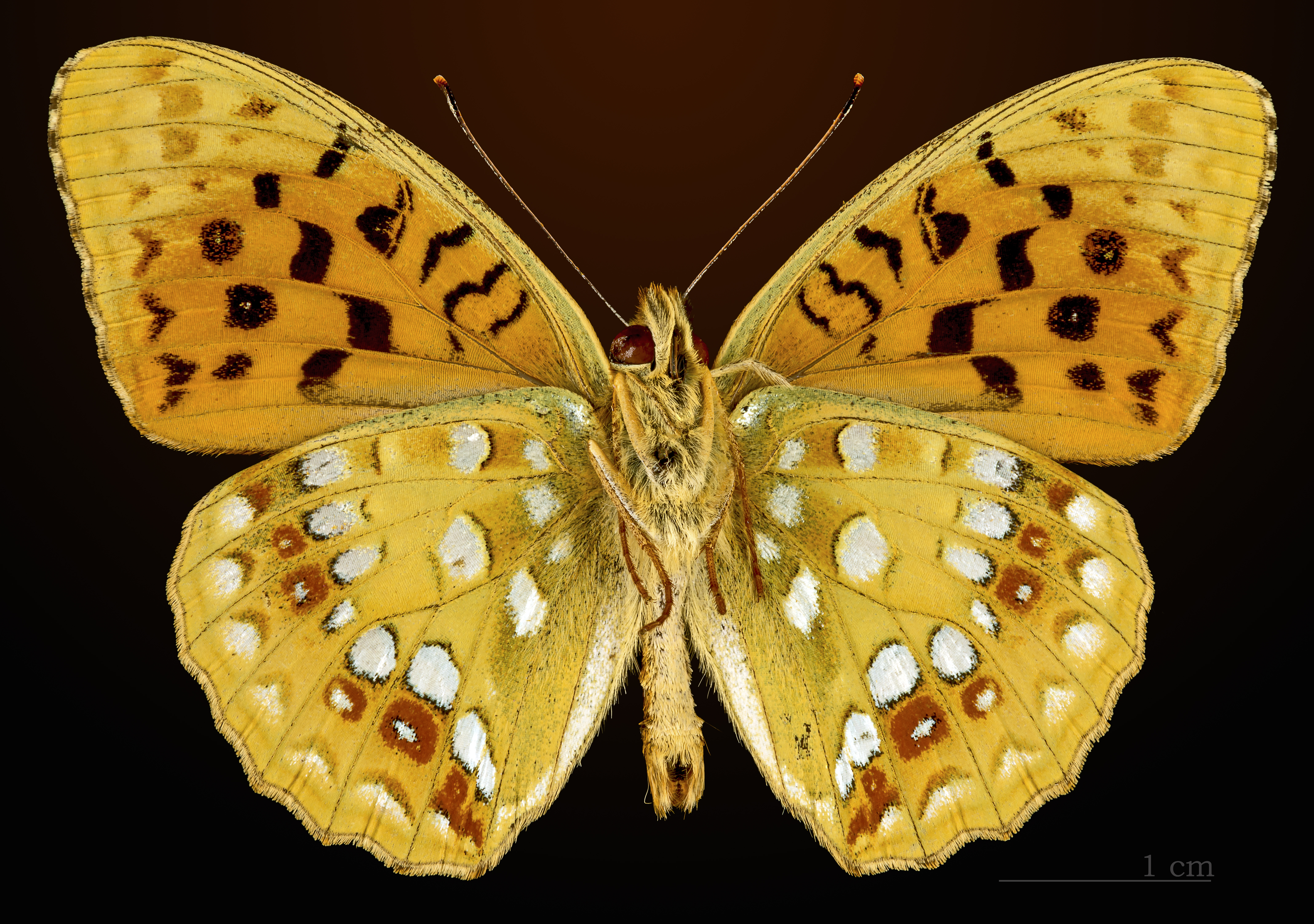
Ventral side

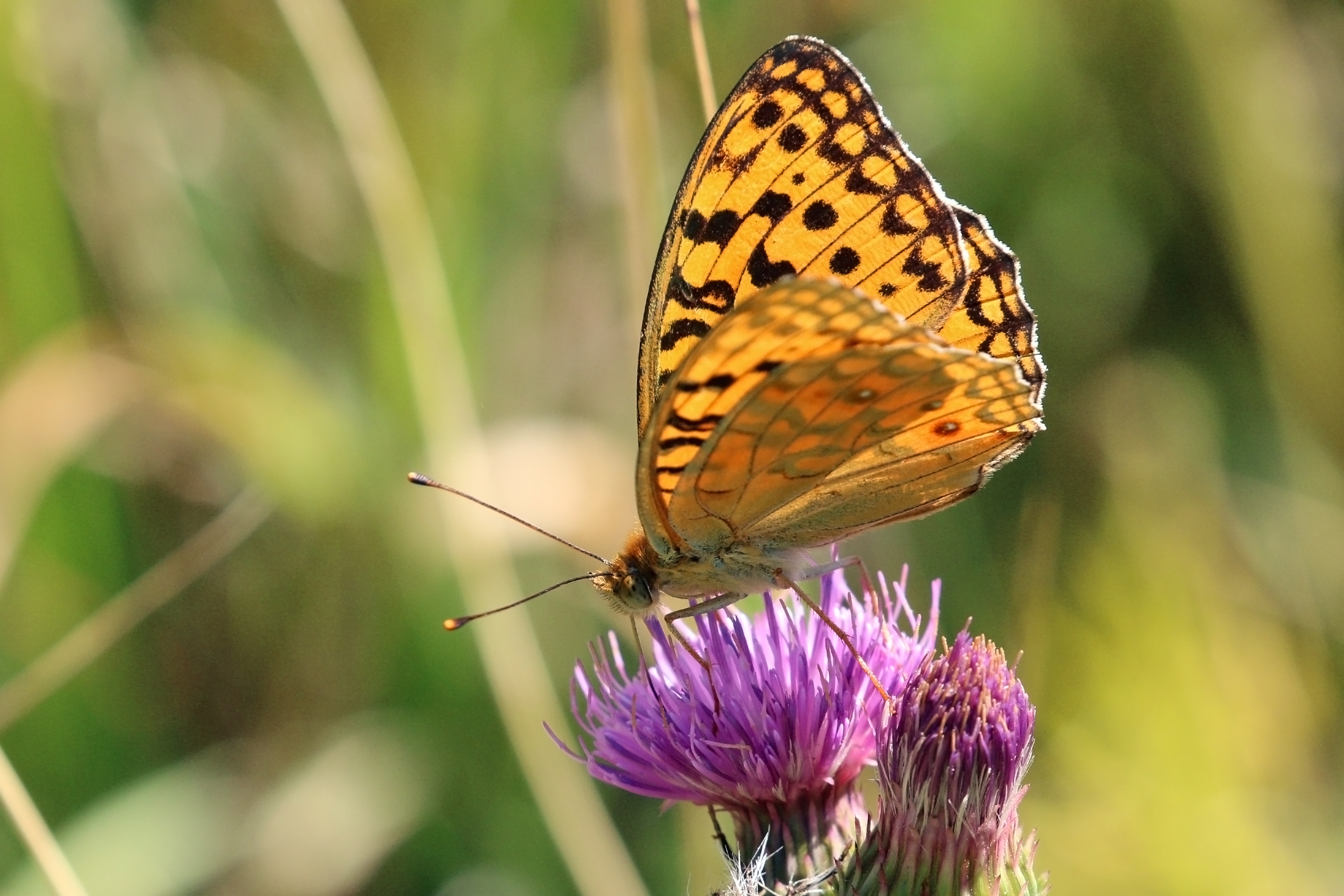
female, form cleodoxa

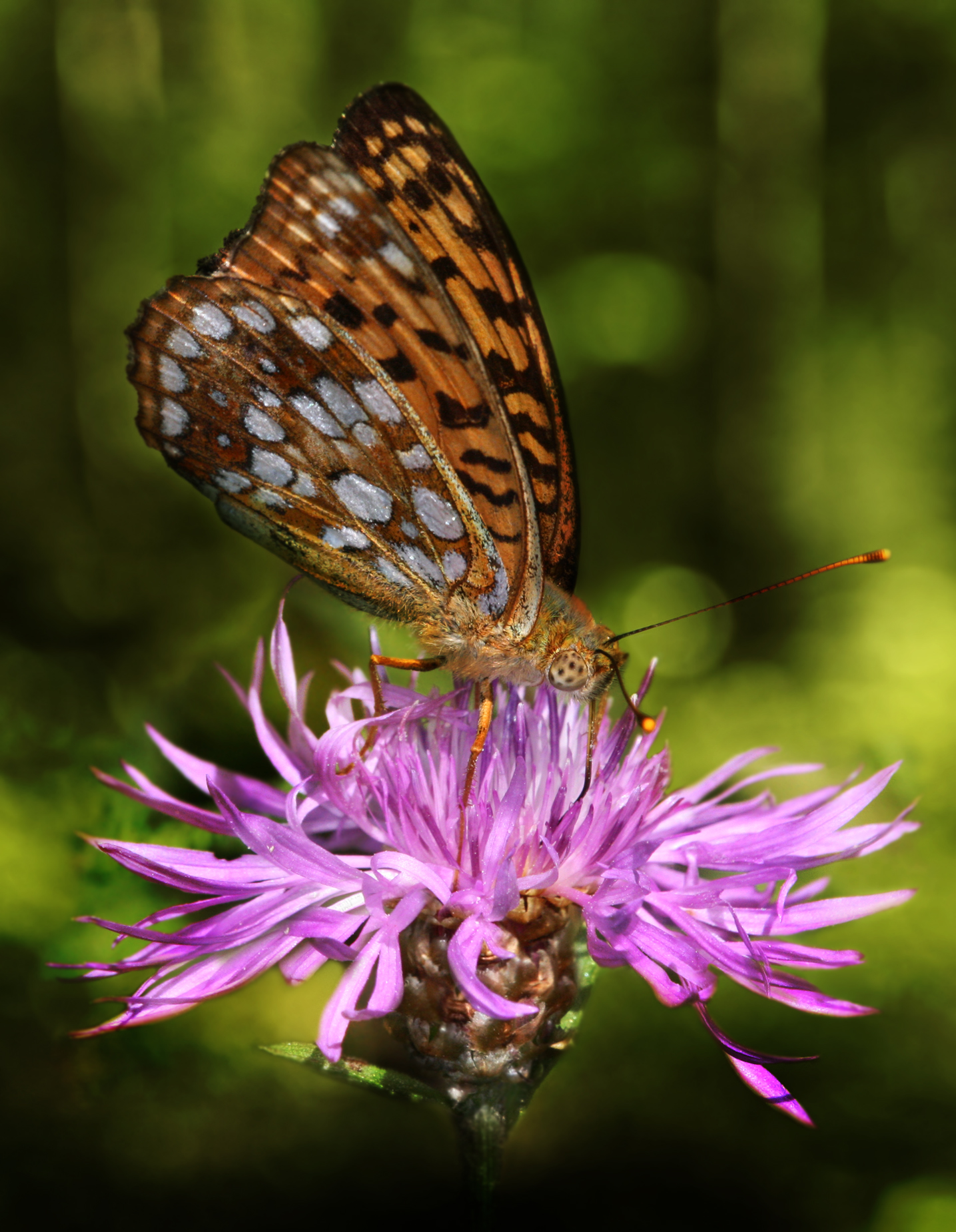
on Centaurea sadleriana

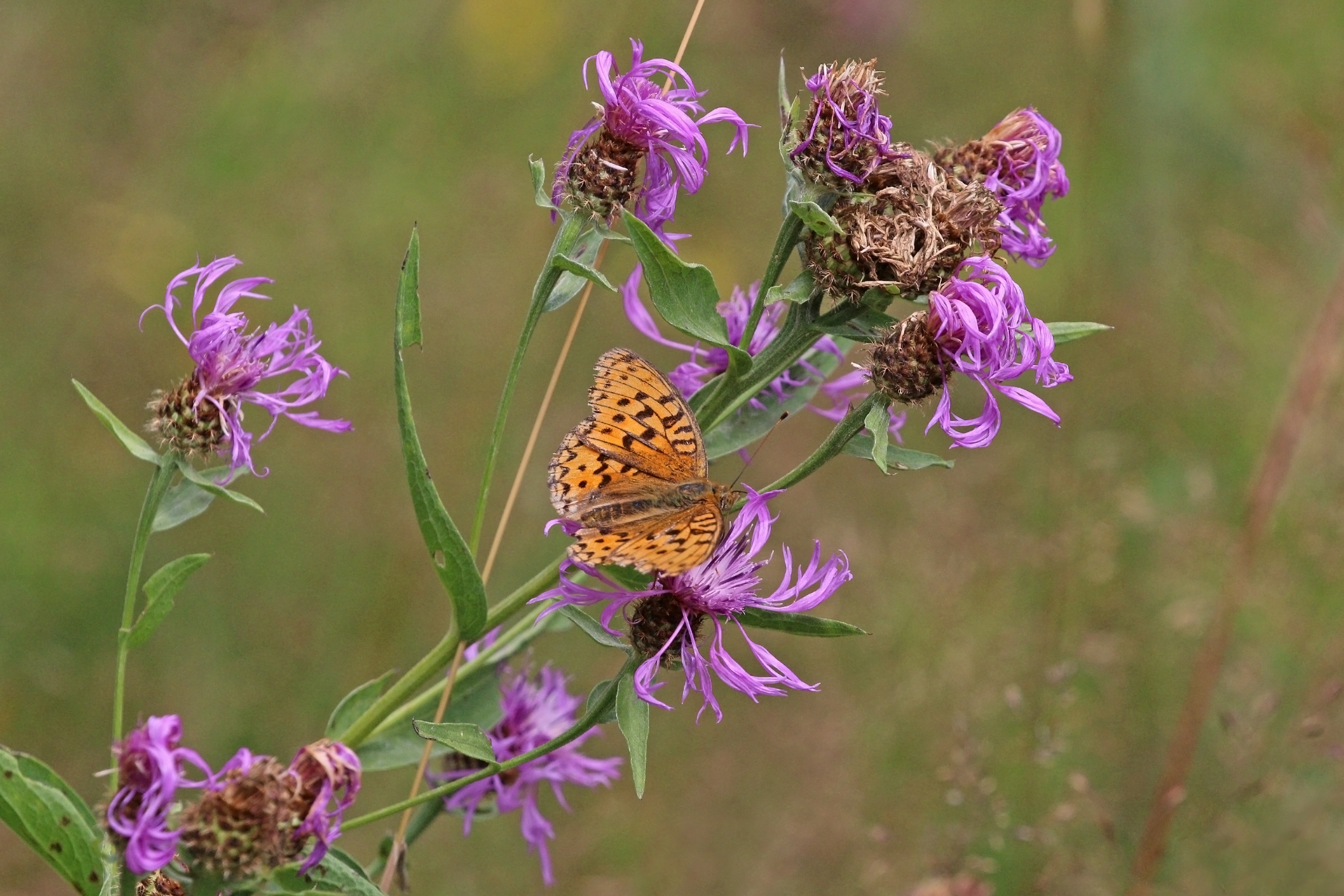
on Centaurea nigra
