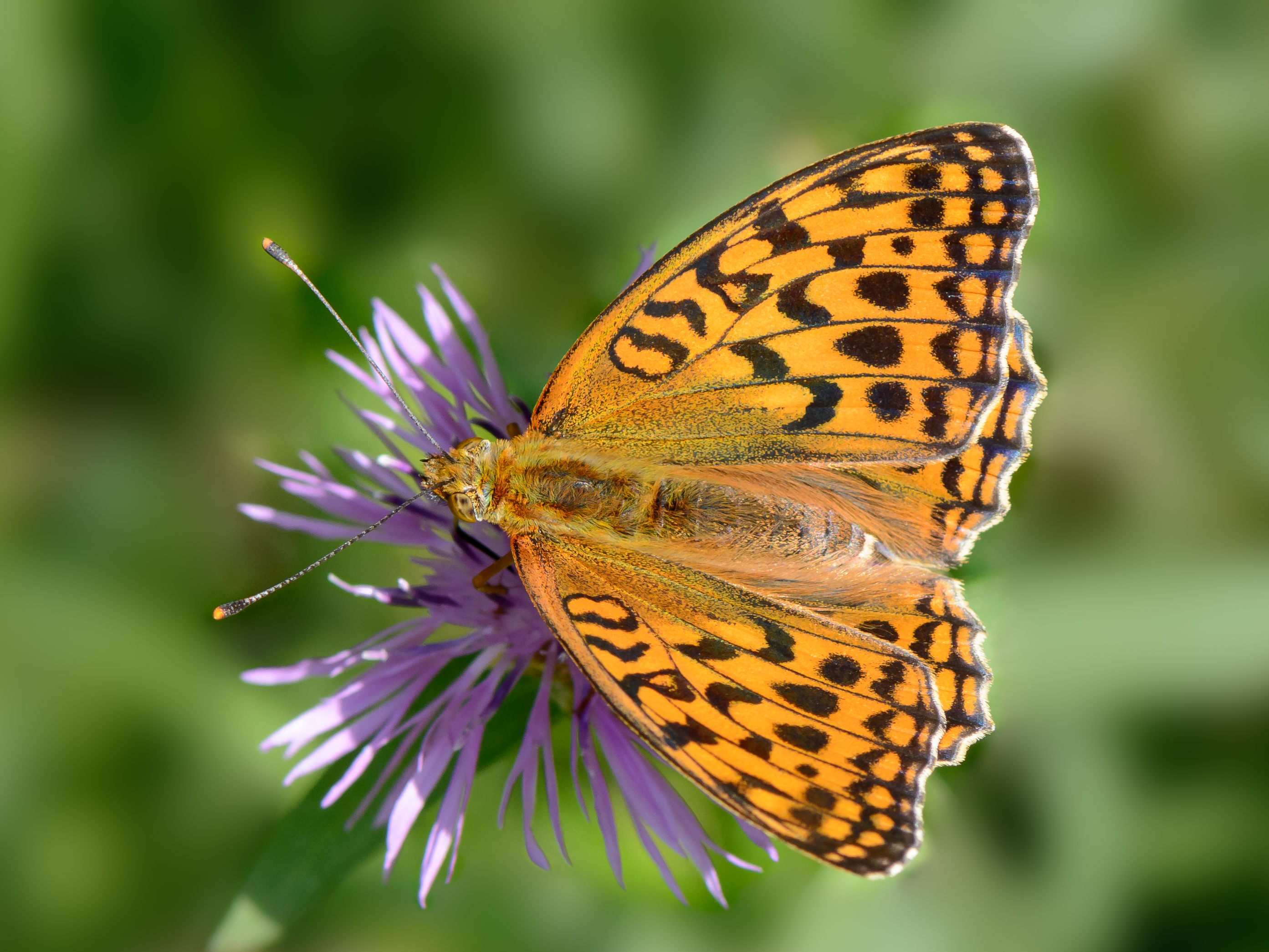
- Female Fabriciana adippe in Austria

Scientific classification
- Domain: Eukaryota
- Kingdom: Animalia
- Phylum: Arthropoda
- Class: Insecta
- Order: Lepidoptera
- Family: Nymphalidae
- Tribe: Argynnini
- Genus: Fabriciana; Reuss, 1920

Synonyms
- Prodryas Reuss, 1926; Profabriciana Reuss, 1926; Proacidalia Reuss, 1926; Protodryas Scudder, 1928

= Fabriciana =

Genus of brush-footed butterflies

Fabriciana is a genus of butterflies in the family Nymphalidae, commonly found in Europe and Asia. The genus was erected by T. Reuss (T. Reuß) in 1920.

== Taxonomy ==
This taxon used to be considered a subgenus of Argynnis, but has been reestablished as a separate genus in 2017.

== Species ==
Listed alphabetically:

| Image | Scientific name | Distribution |
|---|---|---|
| | Fabriciana adippe (Denis & Schiffermüller, 1775) – high brown fritillary | Europe and throughout Asia and Africa |
| | Fabriciana argyrospilata (Kotzsch, 1938) | Afghanistan, the western Pamirs, Pakistan, and northwest India |
| | Fabriciana auresiana (Fruhstorfer, 1908) | Morocco |
| | Fabriciana elisa (Godart, [1824]) – Corsican fritillary | Corsica and Sardinia |
| | Fabriciana hallasanensis Okano, 1998 | Korea |
| | Fabriciana jainadeva (Moore, 1864) | India |
| | Fabriciana kamala (Moore, 1857) | Himalayas, Tibet, Kashmir and Kashmir - northwest India |
| | Fabriciana nerippe (C. & R. Felder, 1862) | Japan, Korea, China |
| | Fabriciana niobe (Linnaeus, 1758) – Niobe fritillary | the United Kingdom and Northern Europe, and is also found in Siberia, Russia, Iran, China, and Korea |
| | Fabriciana vorax (Butler, 1871) | Japan, Korea, Northeast and Central China |
| | Fabriciana xipe (Grum-Grshimailo, 1891) | China, Mongolia and Korea. |
