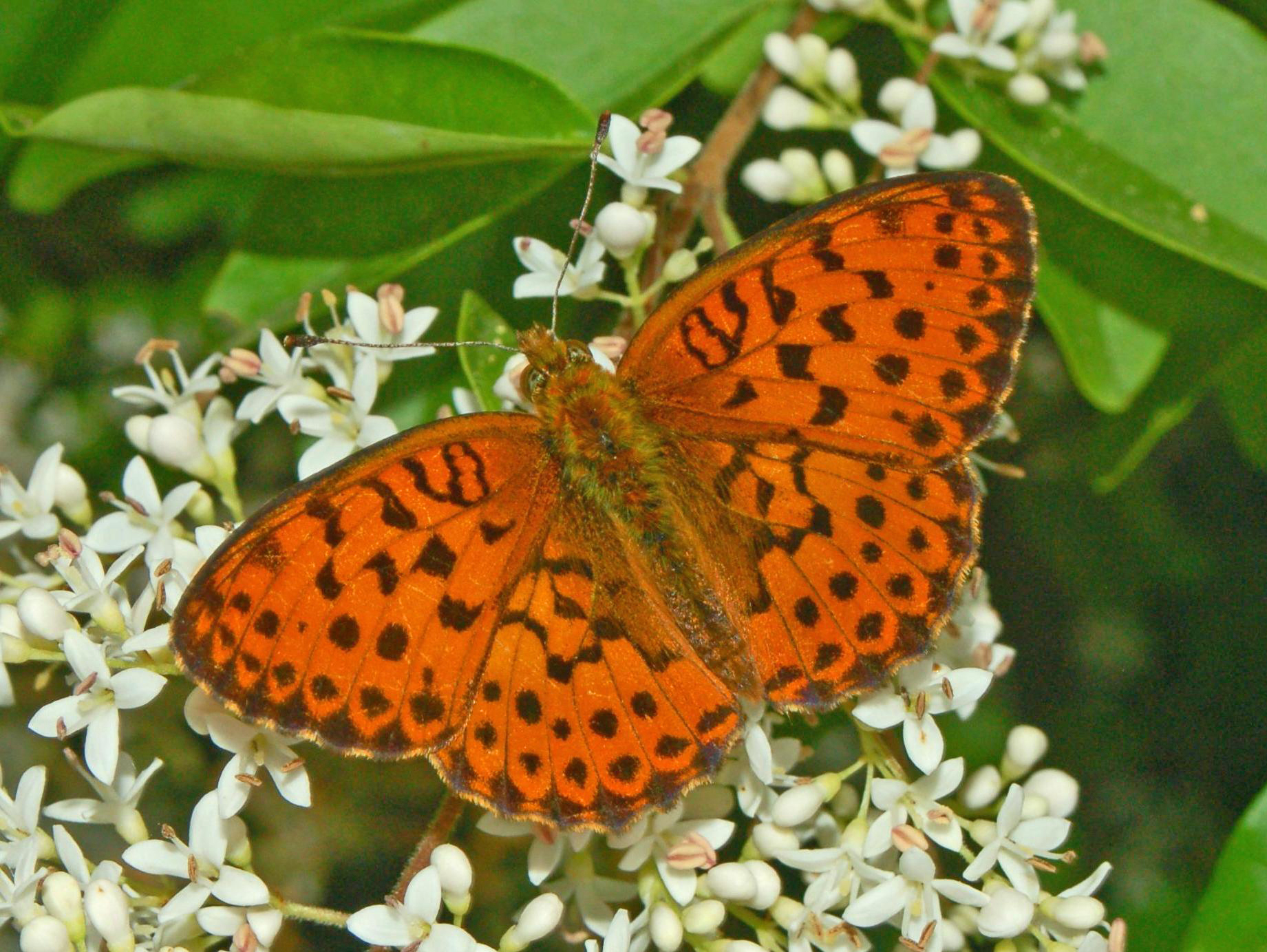
- Dorsal view
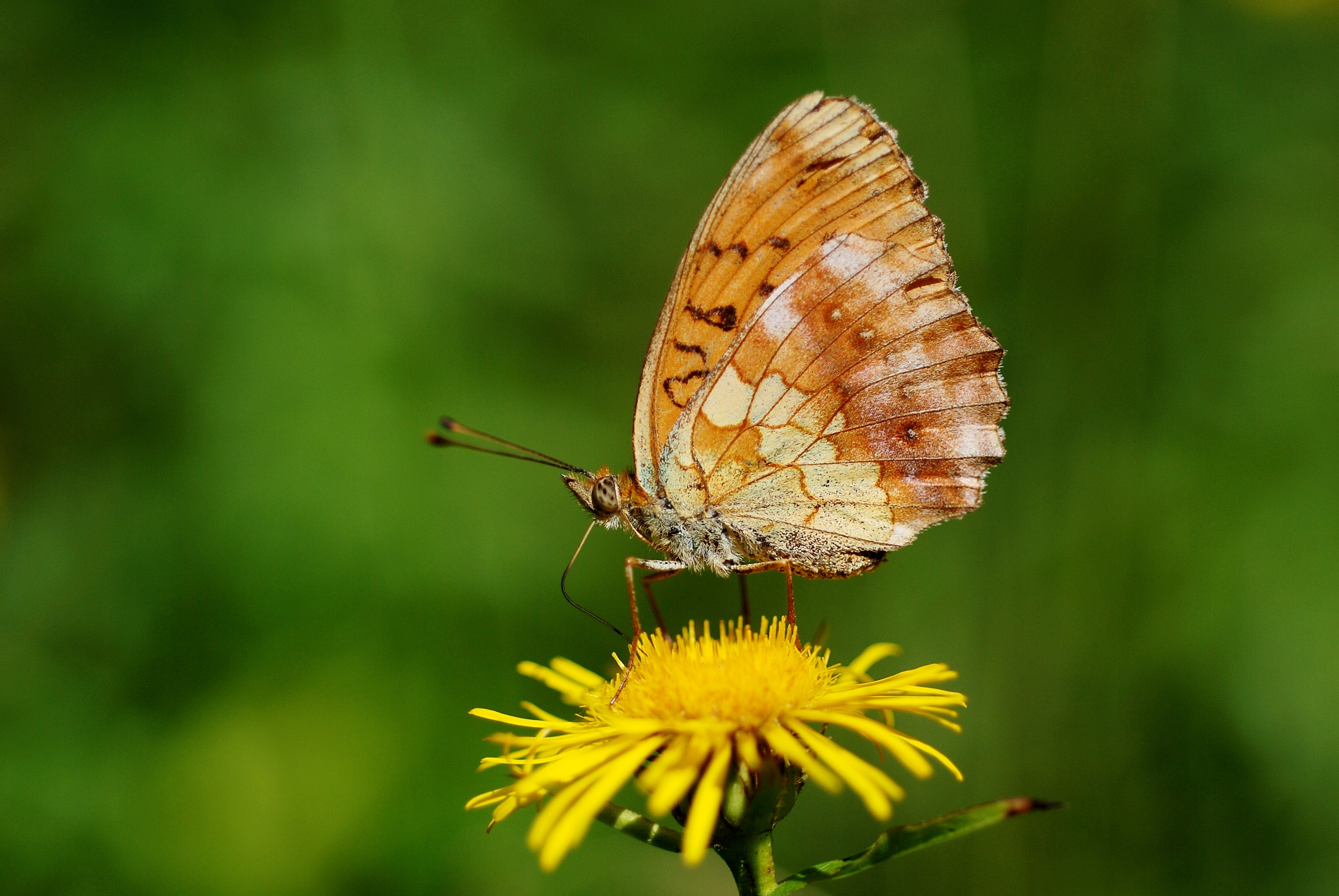
- Ventral view

Scientific classification
- Kingdom: Animalia
- Phylum: Arthropoda
- Clade: Pancrustacea
- Class: Insecta
- Order: Lepidoptera
- Family: Nymphalidae
- Genus: Brenthis
- Species: B. daphne

Binomial name
- Brenthis daphne Bergsträsser, 1780

Synonyms
- Papilio daphne [Denis & Schiffermüller, 1775 & Bergsträsser, 1780]; Papilio chloris [Esper, 1778]; Papilio epidaphne [Fruhstorfer, 1907]; Papilio nikator [Fruhstorfer, 1909]; Papilio japygia [Stauder, 1921]; Papilio taccanii [Turati, 1932]; Papilio praenikator [Verity, 1933]; Papilio anatolica [Belter, 1935]; Papilio siriana [Belter, 1935]

= Brenthis daphne =

Species of butterfly

Brenthis daphne, the marbled fritillary, is a butterfly of the family Nymphalidae.

== Subspecies ==
Subspecies include:

- B. d. daphne (Europe)
- B. d. fumidia (Butler, 1882) (Korea)
- B. d. rabdia Butler, 1877 (Japan)
- B. d. ochroleuca (Fruhstorfer, 1907) (Caucasus, western Siberia)
- B. d. nikator (Fruhstorfer, 1909)
- B. d. japygia (Stauder, 1921)
- B. d. iwatensis Okano, 1951 (Sakhalin, Kuril Islands)

== Distribution and habitat ==
This widespread species is present in the Palearctic realm from the southern parts of continental Europe (northern Spain, southern France, Germany, Italy, and eastwards to Slovakia and Greece), to the Caucasus, western Siberia, Korea and Japan. It prefers warm and sunny forest edges, woodland and bushy areas where the host plants grow, at an elevation of 75–1,750 metres (246–5,741 ft) above sea level.

== Description ==
Brenthis daphne has a wingspan of 30–44 millimetres (1.2–1.7 in). Wings are rather rounded, the basic color of the upperside of the forewings is bright orange, with an incomplete black marginal band. The underside of the hindwings have a yellowish postdiscal band and the marginal area is completely suffused with purple, with a marble effect (hence the common name). The quadrangular patch on the underside hindwing is partially shaded orange pink to outer side. The chrysalis has two dorsal rows of thorns with bright spots and a bright metallic shine.

This species is very similar to the lesser marbled fritillary (Brenthis ino), but the latter is slightly smaller and the coloration of said patch is completely yellow.

== Biology ==
The butterfly flies from late May to early August depending on the location. The eggs are laid separately in July on the leaves of the host plants. The larvae feed on brambles (Rubus fruticosus), raspberry (Rubus idaeus), Rubus caesius, Rubus sachalinensis, Sanguisorba officinalis and Filipendula species, while adults usually feed on nectar from brambles, thistles and other flowers. This species is univoltine. It overwinters at the caterpillar stage in the egg shell.

== Gallery ==
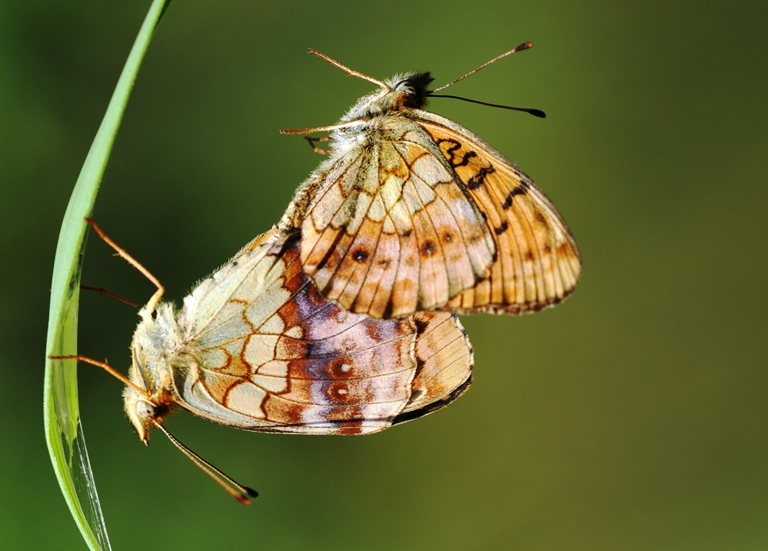
Mating pair

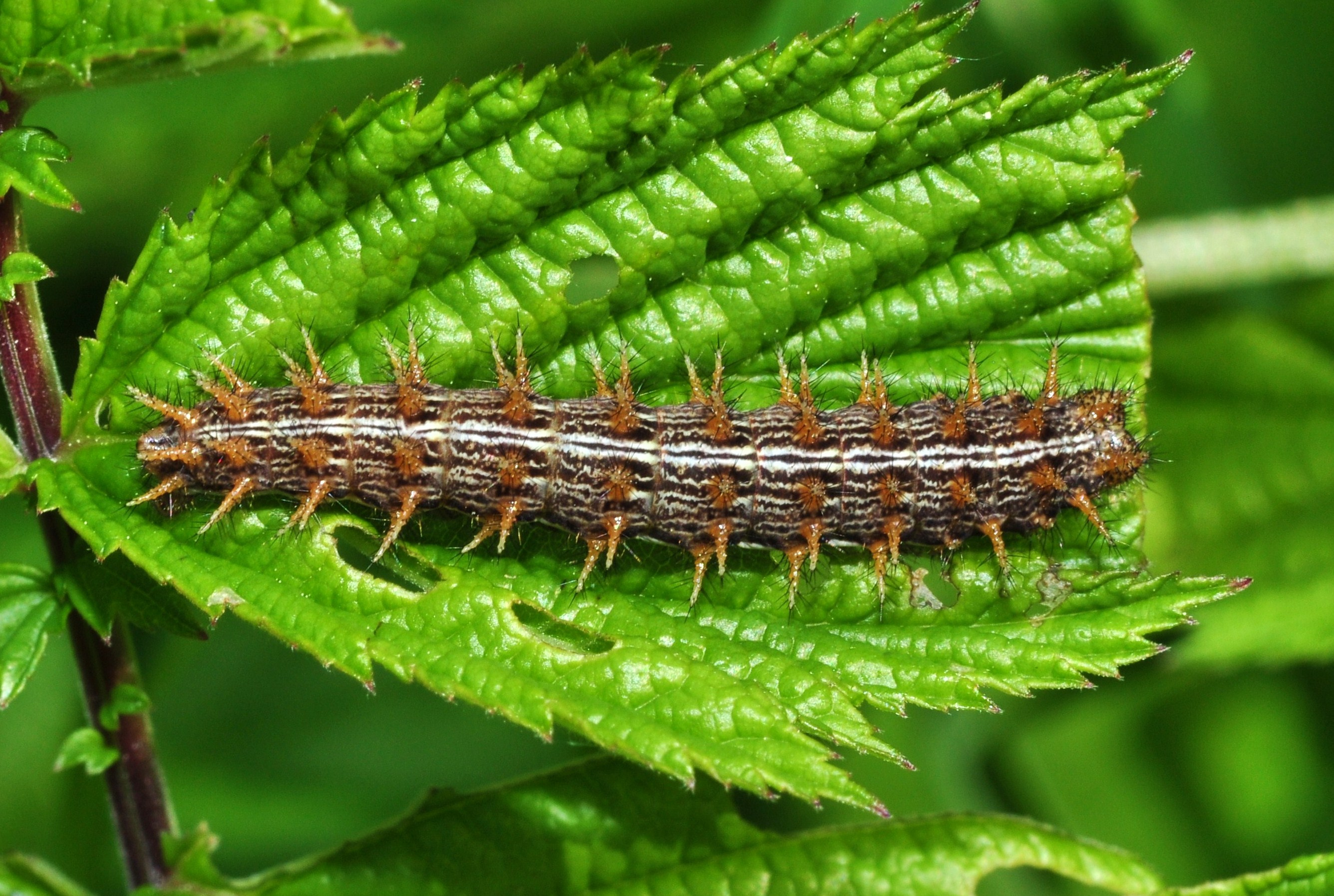
Caterpillar

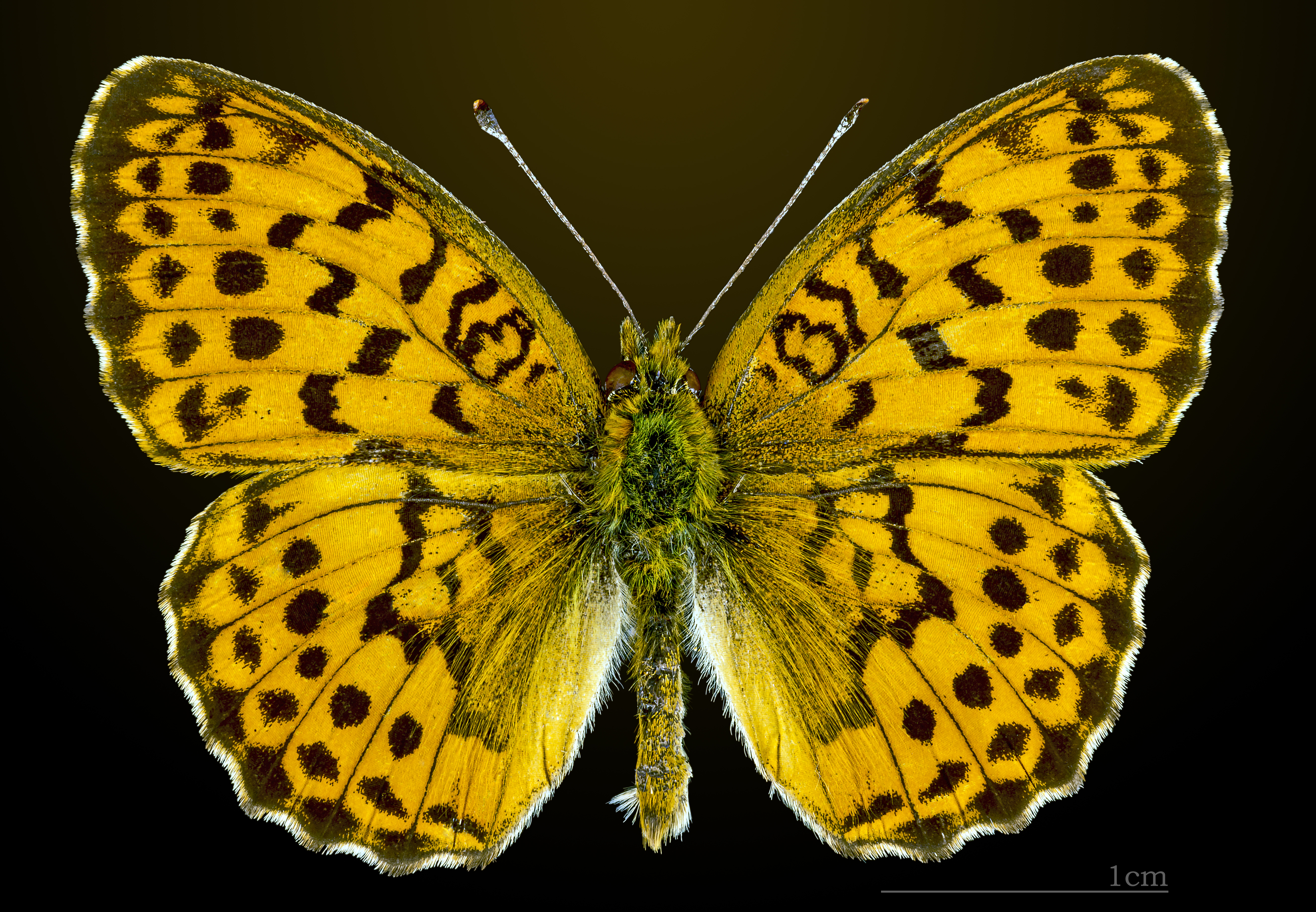
Dorsal side

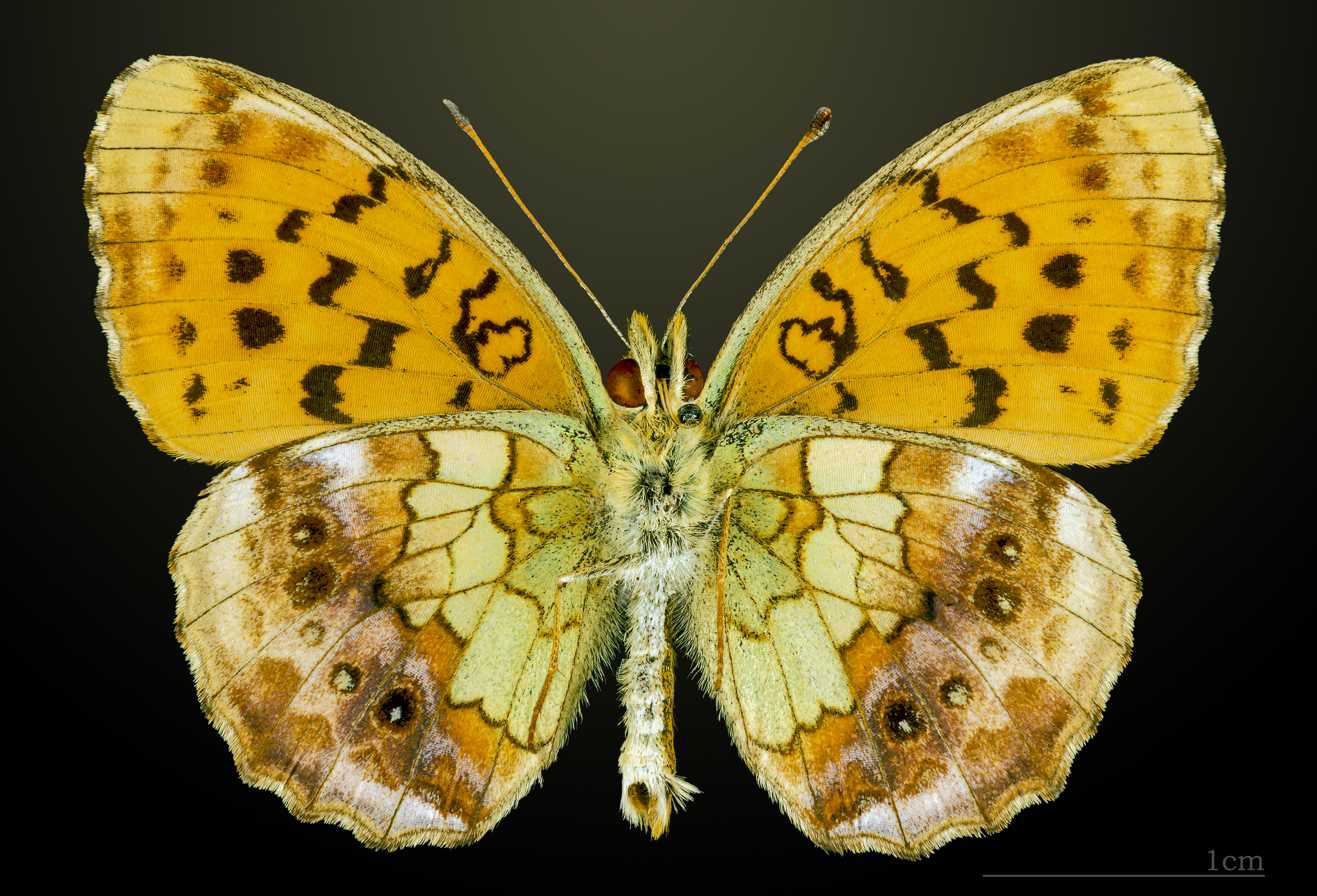
Ventral side

== Etymology ==
Named in the Classical tradition. Daphne in Greek mythology, is a naiad, a nymph associated with fountains, wells, springs, streams and brooks.

== Bibliography ==
- L.G. Higgins & N.D. Riley, Field Guide to the Butterflies of Britain and Europe, London, Collins, 1980, p. 109, ISBN 0002192411
- Novak & F.Severa, Field Guide in Color to Butterflies and Moths, Octopus, 1981, ISBN 0706412931.
- T.Tolman & R.Lewington, Guida alle farfalle d'Europa e Nord Africa, 2014, ISBN 9788866940029
- Tolman T., Lewington R. Collins Field Guide Butterflies of Britain & Europe — London: Harper Collins Publishers, 1997.— 320 p., 106 col. Pl
- VK Tuzov, Guide to Butterflies of the Palearctic Region, G C Bozano, 2003, pp. 46–7, ISBN 8887989044
