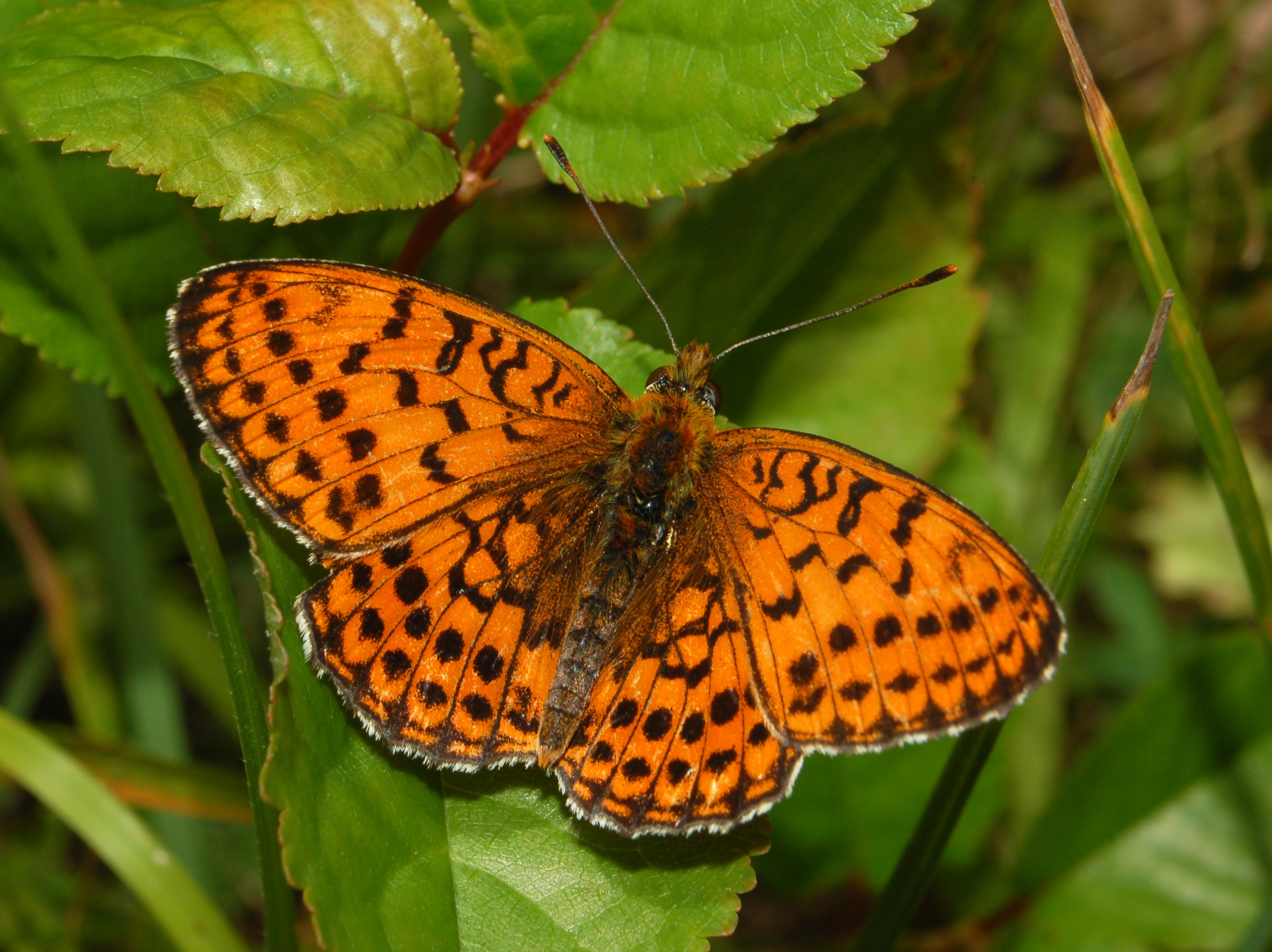
- Dorsal view
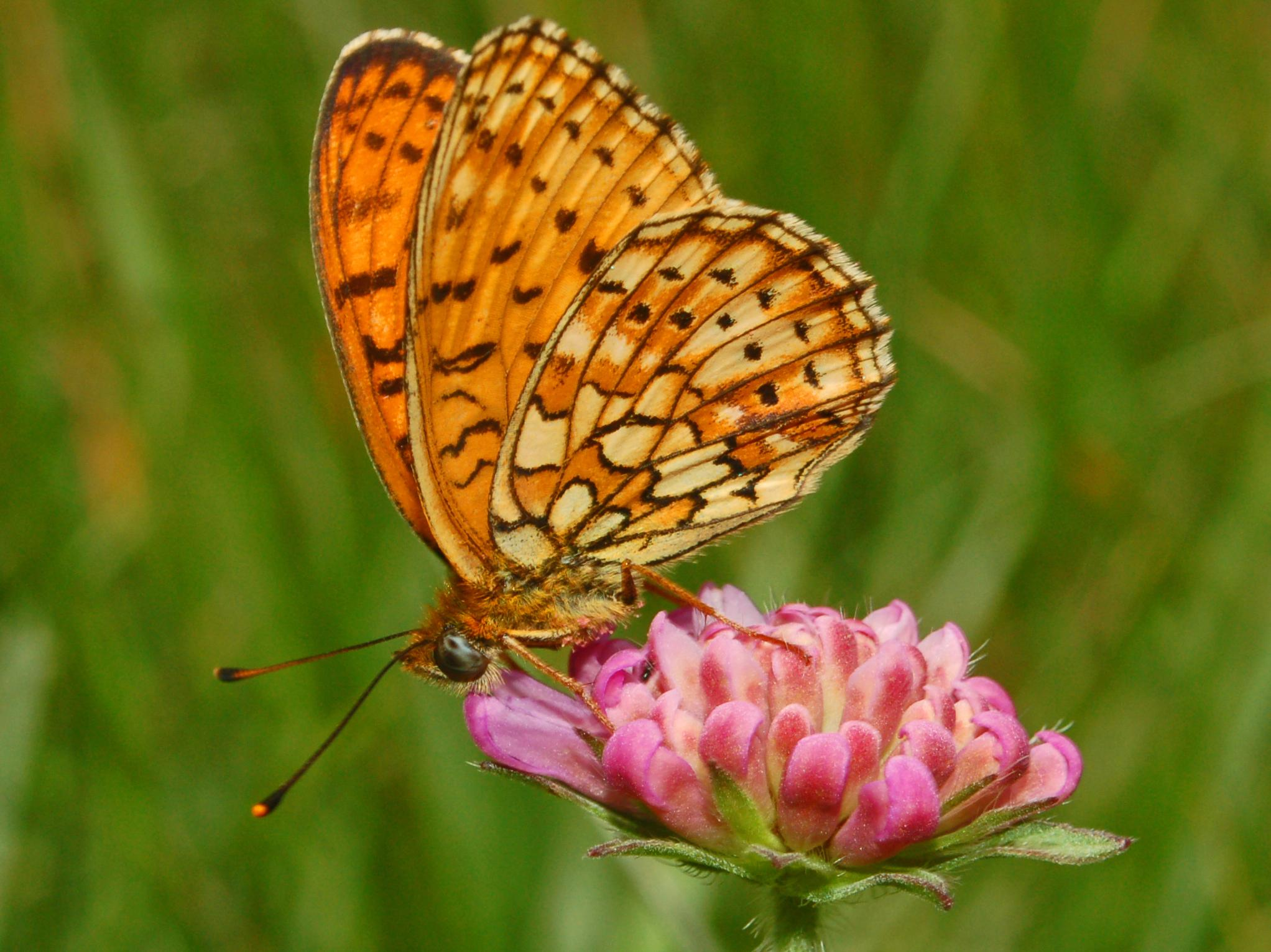
- Ventral view

Scientific classification
- Domain: Eukaryota
- Kingdom: Animalia
- Phylum: Arthropoda
- Class: Insecta
- Order: Lepidoptera
- Family: Nymphalidae
- Genus: Brenthis
- Species: B. hecate

Binomial name
- Brenthis hecate (Denis & Schiffermüller 1775)

= Twin-spot fritillary =

Species of butterfly

The twin-spot fritillary (Brenthis hecate) is a butterfly in the family Nymphalidae.

== Description ==
Brenthis hecate is a large fritillary with a wingspan reaching 35–45 millimetres (1.4–1.8 in) and bright orange uppersides of the wings. The underside of the hindwings shows a double parallel line of brown spots (hence the common name).

== Description in Seitz ==
hecate W . V . (68f). Darker red-brown than most of the preceding species, above similar to niobe, the wings more rounded, the spots thin but sharply defined, all separated from each other, only the median dentate line of the hindwing continuous. The underside is very characteristic; it has no silver and is alternately light yellow and cinnamon-red; the light yellow median band is somewhat shifted basad and is less curved than in euphrosyne, thore, amphilochus, etc. In Central and South Europe, France, Northern Italy, especially Austria-Hungary, Russia and Asia Minor. — caucasica Stgr. [now B. hectae transcaucasica (Wnukowsky, 1929)](68f) is a rather large form, which is more yellowish brown above and very light yellow on the hindwing beneath, the cinnamon-brown being much reduced; from the shores of the Black Sea, especially Armenia. — alaica Stgr.[now B. hecate alaica (Staudinger, 1886)] (68g), from the Pamir and the Ala-Dagh, is rather strongly edged with black above, while the black markings are much reduced on the rest of the surface, especially in the outer third of the forewing. — aigina Fruhst. [now B. hecate aigina (Fruhstorfer, 1908)], from Andalusia, is paler on both sides, the basal half of the hindwing above lighter and the hindwing beneath more uniformly yellow, the russet-red being entirely absent or only vestigial as some smears. — Of individual aberrations ab. priscilla Schultz is characterized by a broad black median band and ab. avernensis Guill. by the darkened upperside having a bluish sheen. Butterflies occur from the end of May till July on mountain meadows and clearings in woods, being very local.

== Biology ==
The flight period extends from May to early August. The larva feeds on Filipendula vulgaris and Dorycnium.

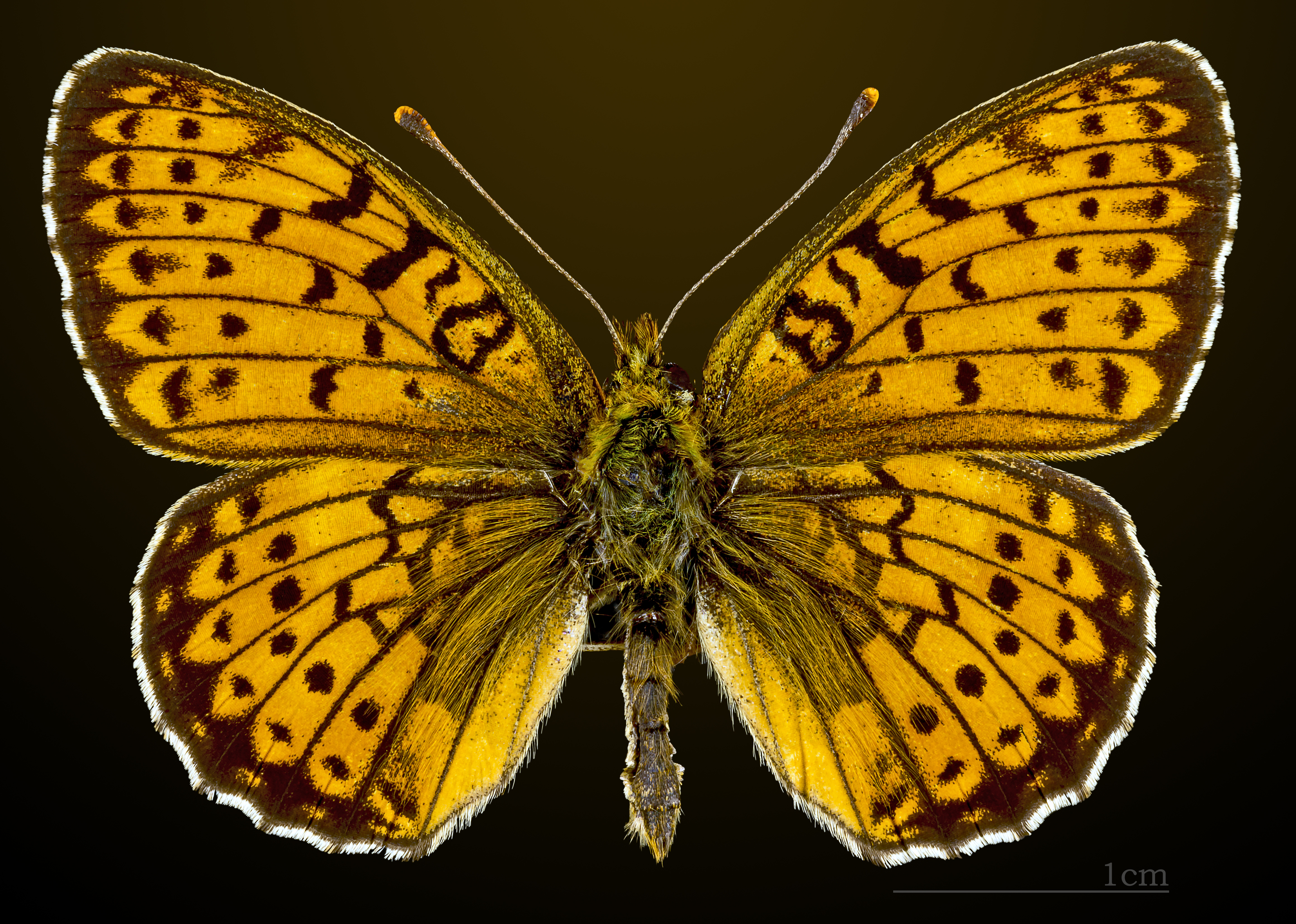
Dorsal

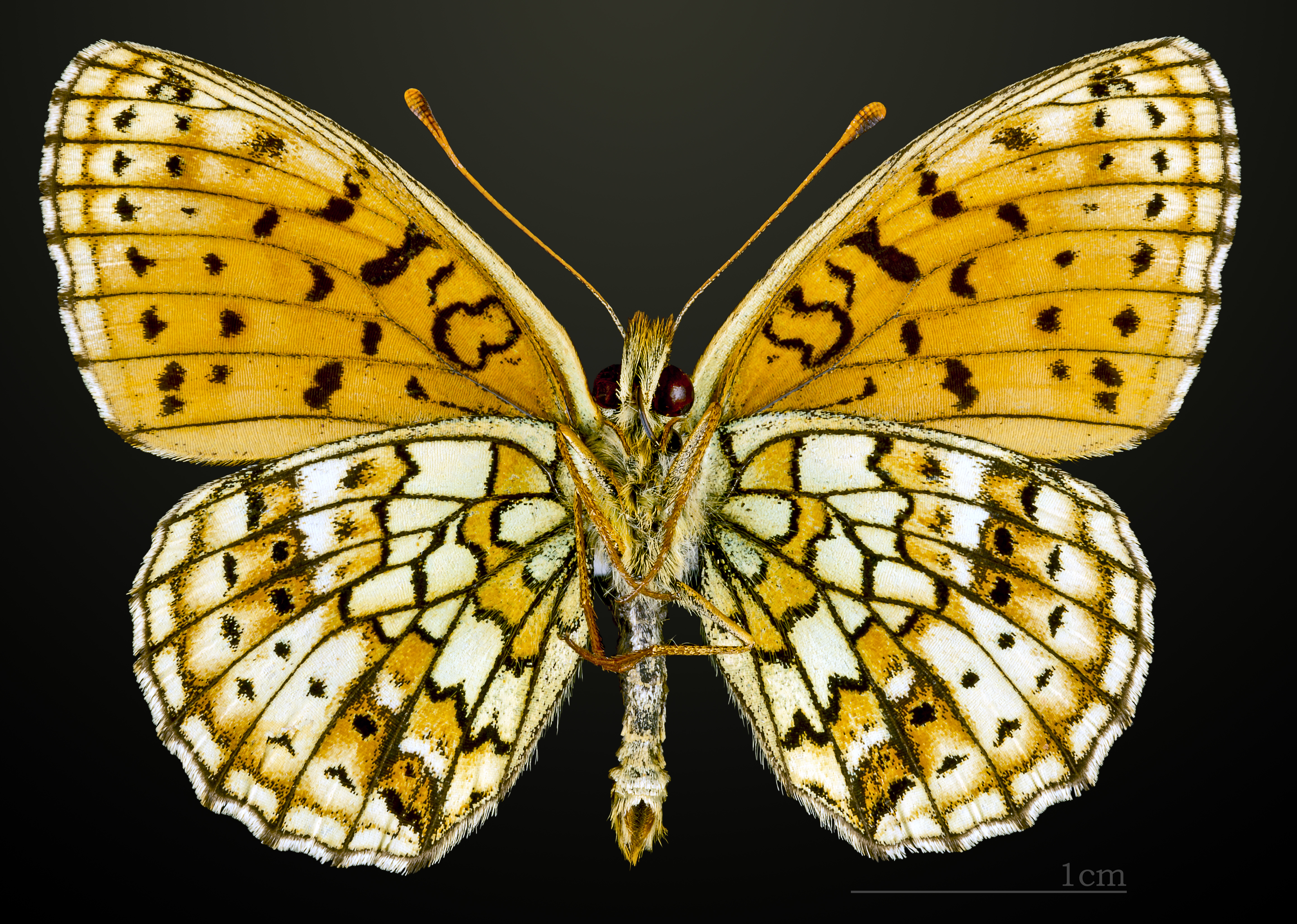
Ventral

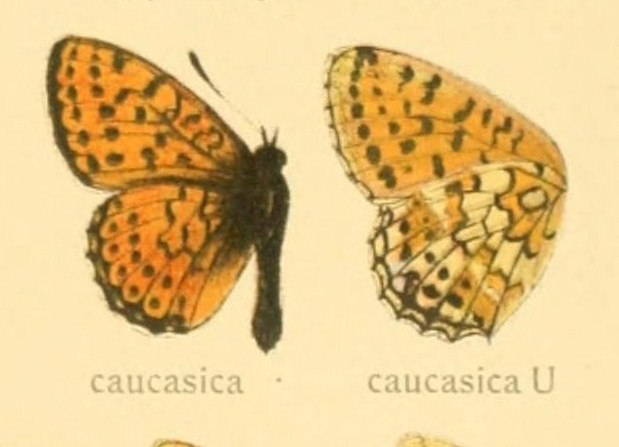
Brenthis hecate caucasica in Seitz

== Distribution ==
Brenthis hecate is found in south-western Europe, Lithuania, southern Russia, the Balkans, Asia Minor, Iran and Central Asia.

== Habitat ==
This species is typical of dry flowery meadows with light scrub and woodland margins, at an elevation of 25–1,500 metres (82–4,921 ft) above sea level.

== Etymology ==
Named in the Classical tradition. Hecate is a goddess in ancient Greek religion and mythology.
