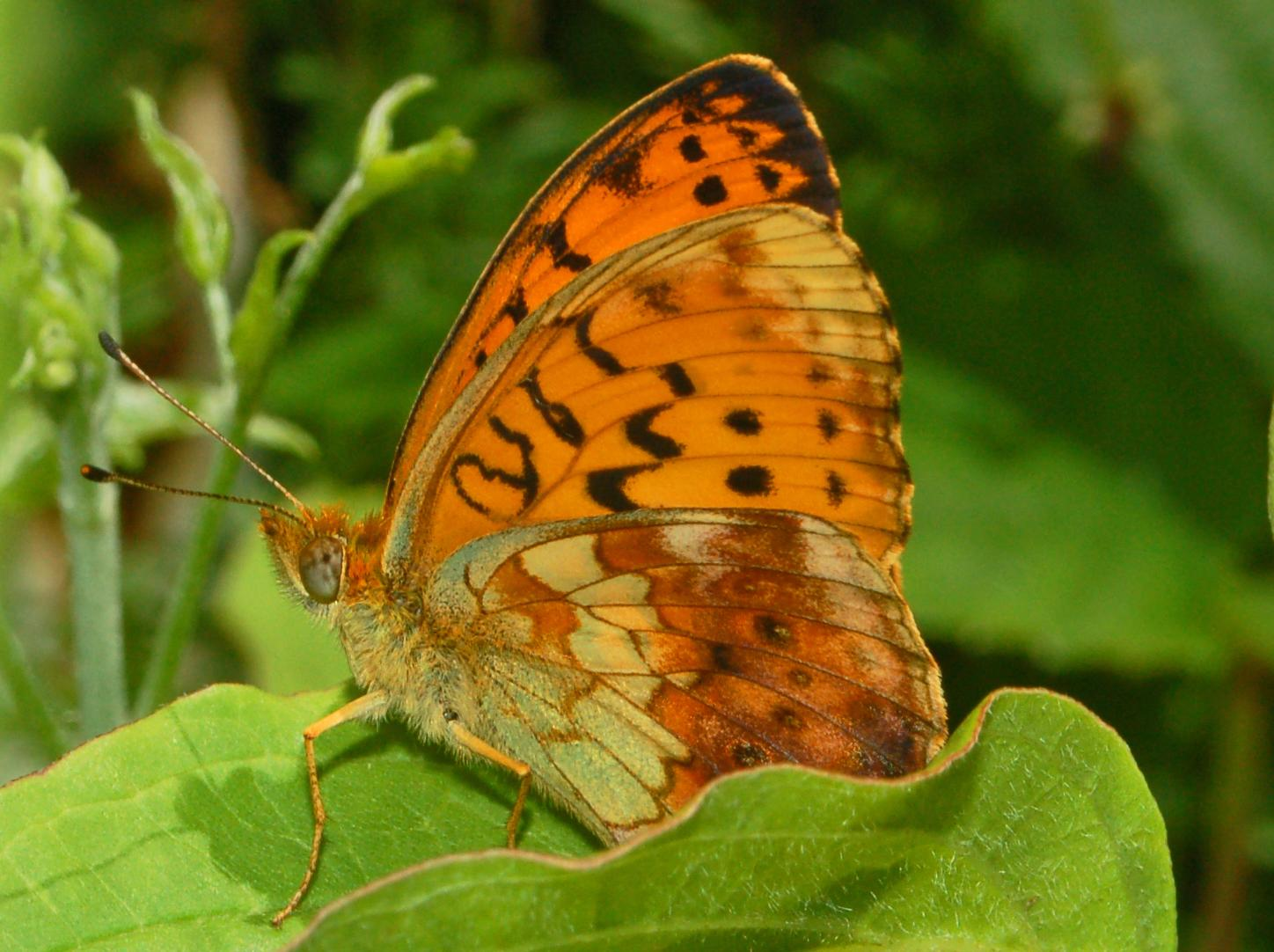
- Brenthis daphne

Scientific classification
- Domain: Eukaryota
- Kingdom: Animalia
- Phylum: Arthropoda
- Class: Insecta
- Order: Lepidoptera
- Family: Nymphalidae
- Tribe: Argynnini
- Genus: Brenthis; Hübner, 1819

= Brenthis =

Genus of brush-footed butterflies

Brenthis is a butterfly genus of the family Nymphalidae.

== Species ==
Caterpillar	Butterfly	Scientific name	Distribution
		Brenthis daphne (Denis & Schiffermüller, 1775) – marbled fritillary	Europe (northern Spain, southern France, Germany, Italy, and eastwards to Slovakia and Greece), to the Caucasus, western Siberia, Korea and Japan
		Brenthis hecate (Denis & Schiffermüller, 1775) – twin-spot fritillary	south-western Europe, Lithuania, southern Russia, the Balkans, Asia Minor, Iran and Central Asia.
		Brenthis ino (Rottemburg, 1775) – lesser marbled fritillary	Europe, Siberia, temperate Asia, northern China and Japan.
		Brenthis mofidii Wyatt, 1969	Iran.
