= Brenthis mofidii =

Scientific classification
- Kingdom: Animalia
- Phylum: Arthropoda
- Class: Insecta
- Order: Lepidoptera
- Family: Nymphalidae
- Genus: Brenthis
- Species: B. mofidii

Binomial name
- Brenthis mofidii Wyatt, 1969

Species of butterfly

Brenthis mofidii, the Mofidi's fritillary, is a butterfly in the family Nymphalidae. It was described by Wyatt in 1969.

== Subspecies ==
- Brenthis mofidii mofidii
- Brenthis mofidii zabensis Leestmans & Carbonell, 1993 (Turkey)
