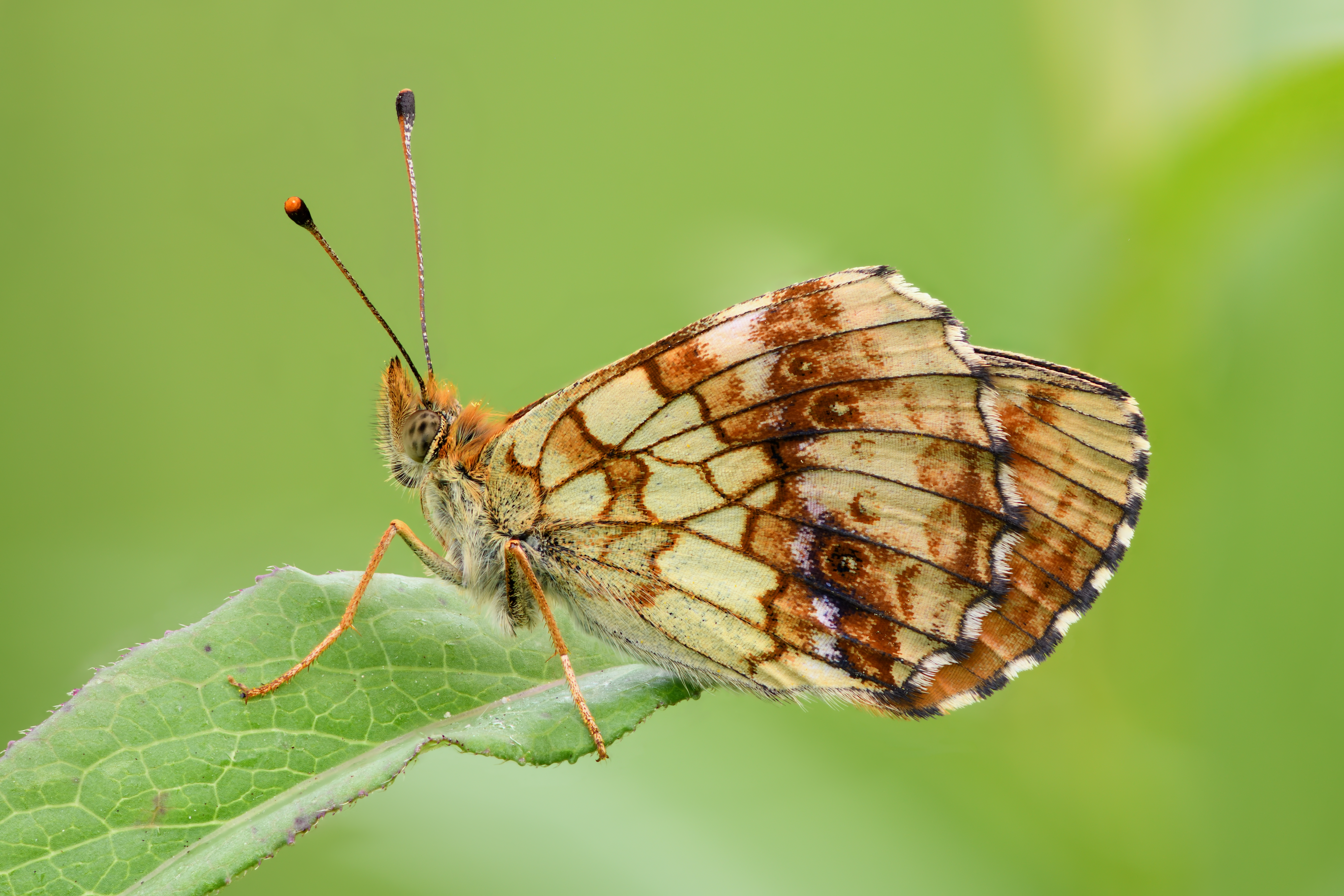
- Underside

Scientific classification
- Kingdom: Animalia
- Phylum: Arthropoda
- Clade: Pancrustacea
- Class: Insecta
- Order: Lepidoptera
- Family: Nymphalidae
- Genus: Brenthis
- Species: B. ino

Binomial name
- Brenthis ino Rottemburg, 1775

Synonyms
- Papilio ino Rottemburg, 1775; Papilio dictynna [Schiffermüller, 1775]; Papilio parthenie Bergsträsser, 1780

= Brenthis ino =

Lesser marbled fritillary
- B. i. ino, Latvia

Species of butterfly

Brenthis ino, the lesser marbled fritillary, is a butterfly of the family Nymphalidae.

== Subspecies ==
- B. i. ino in Europe
- B. i. achasis (Fruhstorfer, 1907)
- B. i. acrita (Fruhstorfer, 1907)
- B. i. adalberti (Fruhstorfer, 1916)
- B. i. amurensis (Staudinger, 1887)
- B. i. maxima (Staudinger, 1887)
- B. i. paidicus (Fruhstorfer, 1907)
- B. i. parvimarginalis Nakahara, 1926
- B. i. schmitzi Wagener, 1983
- B. i. siopelus (Fruhstorfer, 1907)
- B. i. tigroides (Fruhstorfer, 1907)
- B. i. trachalus (Fruhstorfer, 1916)

== Distribution ==
The lesser marbled fritillary is present in Spain, France, Italy, central and northern Europe, Siberia, temperate Asia, northern China and Japan.

== Habitat ==
This species prefers damp meadows and bogs at an elevation of 0–1,500 metres (0–4,921 ft) above sea level.

== Description ==
Brenthis ino is a medium-sized butterfly with a wingspan of 34–42 millimetres (1.3–1.7 in). Females are larger and usually darker than males. The antennae are clavate (club shaped). The basic color of the upper side of the wings is orange with several dark brown blotches. The edges are brown too, with a discontinuous stripe of small blotches. The lower side of the wings is creamy orange with an indented edge and dark brown blotches on the forewings, while the hindwings show brown-edged beige blotches and some ringed dark brown and violet shading spots. The wings of this species lacks any silver blotches. The butterfly flies from June to August depending on the location. It overwinters in the form of caterpillar. The larvae feed on meadowsweet (Filipendula ulmaria), dropwort (Filipendula vulgaris), stone bramble (Rubus saxatilis), raspberry (Rubus idaeus), Aruncus species, Spiraea species and salad burnet (Sanguisorba minor).

== Gallery ==
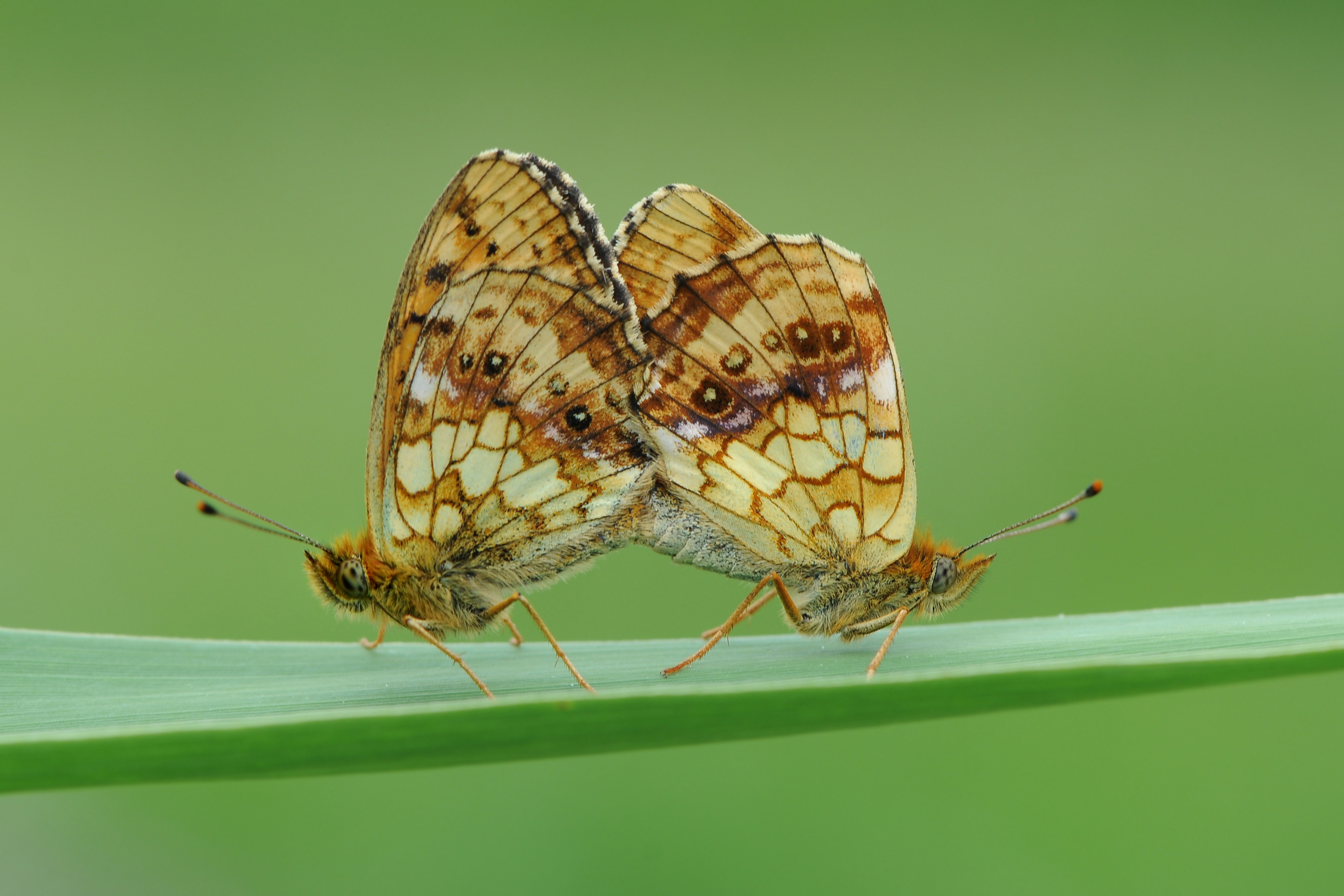
Mating pair

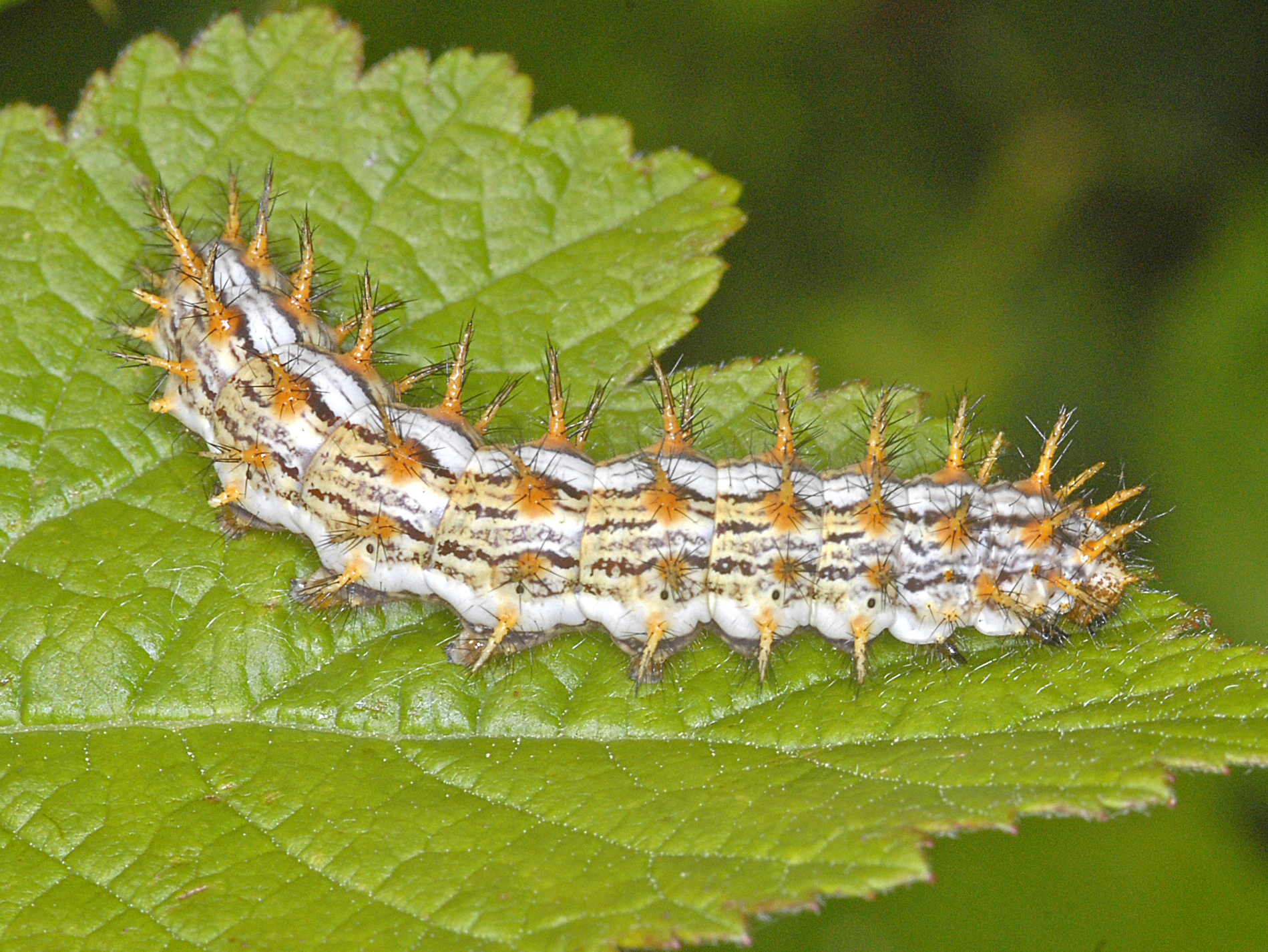
Caterpillar

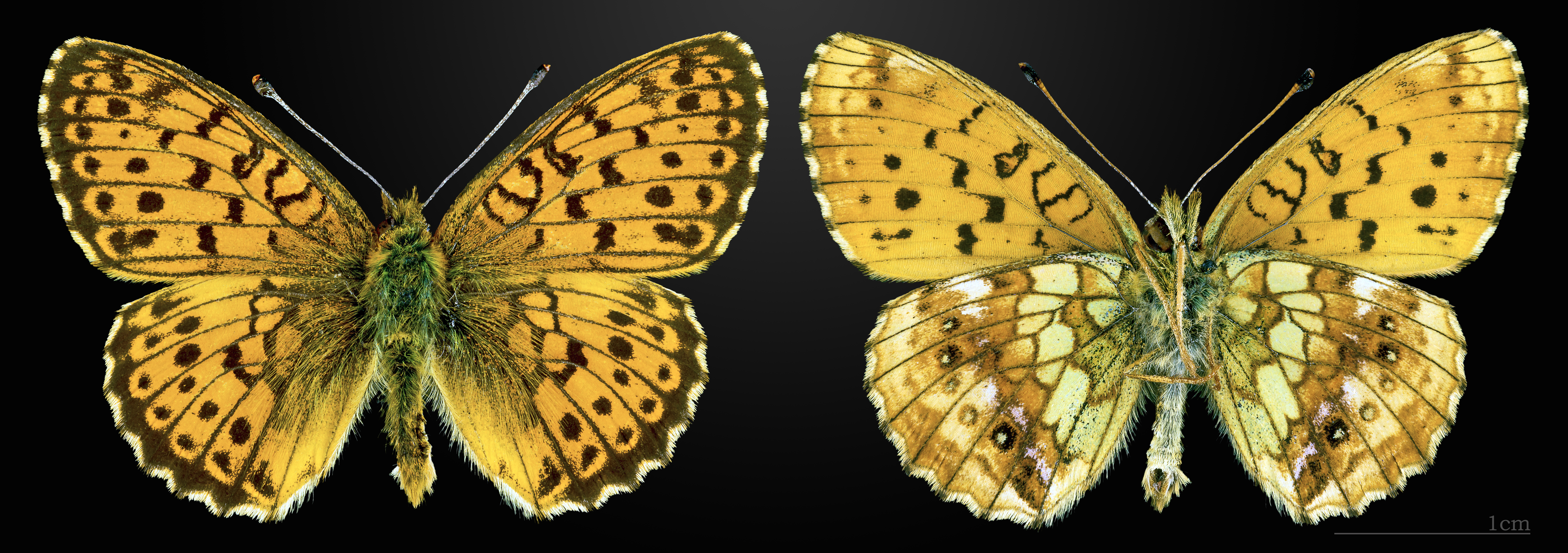
Both sides
