= List of butterflies of Estonia =

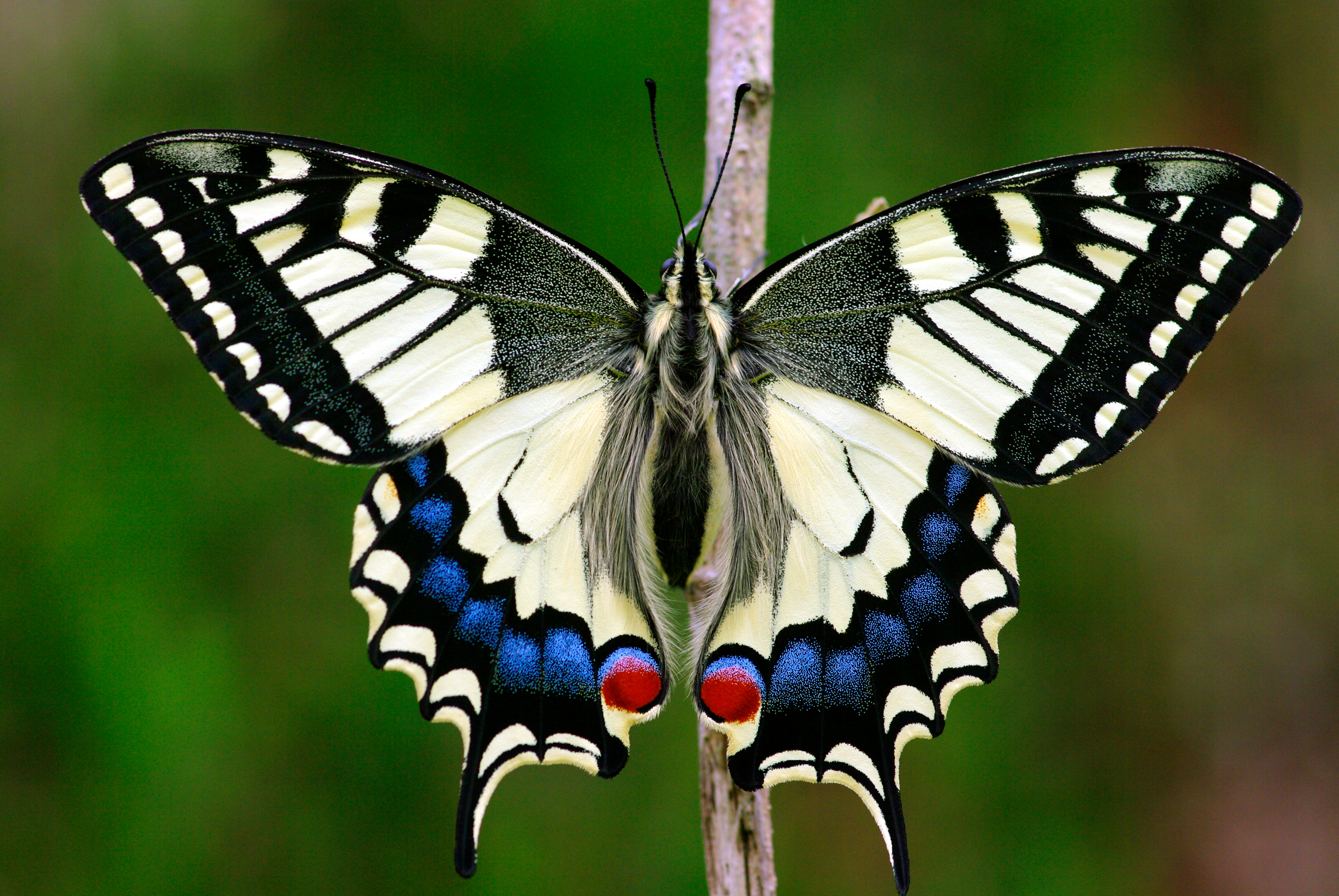
Papilio machaon has been the national butterfly of Estonia since 2017.

This is a list of butterfly species recorded in Estonia (species not encountered in the past 100 years are excluded).

In late 2017, Papilio machaon was among several species of butterflies selected by the Estonian Society of Lepidopterists as contenders for the national butterfly of Estonia. Nearly 5,000 members of the public voted online, with P. machaon receiving 2,664 votes, overwhelmingly winning the title. As well as becoming the national butterfly of Estonia, P. machaon was named as butterfly of the year for 2018; an honor given to a native butterfly species in Estonia annually.

== Hesperiidae – skippers ==
- Dingy skipper - Erynnis tages
- Grizzled skipper - Pyrgus malvae
- Olive skipper - Pyrgus serratulae
- Large grizzled skipper - Pyrgus alveus
- Large chequered skipper - Heteropterus morpheus
- Northern chequered skipper - Carterocephalus silvicola
- Chequered skipper - Carterocephalus palaemon
- Essex skipper - Thymelicus lineola
- Small skipper - Thymelicus sylvestris
- Large skipper - Ochlodes sylvanus
- Silver-spotted skipper - Hesperia comma

== Papilionidae – swallowtails ==
- Old World swallowtail - Papilio machaon
- Scarce swallowtail - Iphiclides podalirius
- Clouded Apollo - Parnassius mnemosyne

== Pieridae – whites ==
- Black-veined white - Aporia crataegi
- Large white - Pieris brassicae
- Small white - Pieris rapae
- Green-veined white - Pieris napi
- Bath white - Pontia daplidice
- Wood white - Leptidea sinapis
- Orange tip - Anthocharis cardamines
- Brimstone - Gonepteryx rhamni
- Moorland clouded yellow - Colias palaeno
- Pale clouded yellow - Colias hyale
- Clouded yellow - Colias crocea

== Nymphalidae ==
- White admiral - Limenitis camilla
- Poplar admiral - Limenitis populi
- Purple emperor - Apatura iris
- Lesser purple emperor - Apatura ilia
- European peacock - Aglais io
- Small tortoiseshell - Aglais urticae
- Red admiral - Vanessa atalanta
- Painted lady - Vanessa cardui
- Scarce tortoiseshell - Nymphalis xanthomelas
- Large tortoiseshell - Nymphalis polychloros
- Camberwell beauty - Nymphalis antiopa
- False comma - Nymphalis vaualbum
- Comma - Polygonia c-album
- Map - Araschnia levana
- Scarce fritillary - Euphydryas maturna
- Marsh fritillary - Euphydryas aurinia
- False heath fritillary - Melitaea diamina
- Heath fritillary - Melitaea athalia
- Nickerl's fritillary - Melitaea aurelia
- Knapweed fritillary - Melitaea phoebe
- Glanville fritillary - Melitaea cinxia
- Spotted fritillary - Melitaea didyma
- Dark green fritillary - Speyeria aglaja
- Niobe fritillary - Fabriciana niobe
- High brown fritillary - Fabriciana adippe
- Silver-washed fritillary - Argynnis paphia
- Cardinal - Argynnis pandora
- Pallas's fritillary - Argynnis laodice
- Lesser marbled fritillary - Brenthis ino
- Queen of Spain fritillary - Issoria lathonia
- Small pearl-bordered fritillary - Boloria selene
- Pearl-bordered fritillary - Boloria euphrosyne
- Frigga fritillary - Boloria frigga
- Weaver's fritillary - Boloria dia
- Titania's fritillary - Boloria titania
- Freija fritillary - Boloria freija
- Cranberry fritillary - Boloria aquilonaris
- Bog fritillary - Boloria eunomia
- Arran brown - Erebia ligea
- Lapland ringlet - Erebia embla
- Marbled white - Melanargia galathea
- Baltic grayling - Oeneis jutta
- Grayling - Hipparchia semele
- Ringlet - Aphantopus hyperanthus
- Speckled wood - Pararge aegeria
- Northern wall brown - Lasiommata petropolitana
- Large wall - Lasiommata maera
- Woodland brown - Lopinga achine
- Meadow brown - Maniola jurtina
- Dusky meadow brown - Hyponephele lycaon
- Scarce heath - Coenonympha hero
- Coenonympha amyntas
- Pearly heath - Coenonympha arcania
- Small heath - Coenonympha pamphilius
- Large heath - Coenonympha tullia

== Riodinidae - metalmarks ==
- Duke of Burgundy - Hamearis lucina

== Lycaenidae ==
- Purple hairstreak - Thecla quercus
- Brown hairstreak - Thecla betulae
- Ilex hairstreak - Satyrium ilicis
- White-letter hairstreak - Satyrium w-album
- Black hairstreak - Satyrium pruni
- Green hairstreak - Callophrys rubi
- Scarce copper - Lycaena virgaureae
- Sooty copper - Lycaena tityrus
- Purple-shot copper - Lycaena alciphron
- Small copper - Lycaena phlaeas
- Large copper - Lycaena dispar
- Purple-edged copper - Lycaena hippothoe
- Short-tailed blue - Cupido argiades
- Small blue - Cupido minimus
- Holly blue - Celastrina argiolus
- Eastern baton blue - Pseudophilotes vicrama
- Chequered blue - Scolitantides orion
- Green-underside blue - Glaucopsyche alexis
- Large blue - Phengaris arion
- Idas blue - Plebejus idas
- Silver-studded blue - Plebejus argus
- Mountain argus - Aricia artaxerxes
- Geranium argus - Eumedonia eumedon
- Cranberry blue - Agriades optilete
- Mazarine blue - Cyaniris semiargus
- Common blue - Polyommatus icarus
- Amanda's blue - Polyommatus amandus
- Damon blue - Polyommatus damon
- Adonis blue - Lysandra bellargus
- Chalkhill blue - Lysandra coridon

== See also ==
- List of moths of Estonia
- List of the butterflies of Saint Petersburg and Leningrad Oblast
