= List of butterflies of Saint Petersburg and Leningrad Oblast =

This is a comprehensive list of the butterflies recorded in Saint Petersburg and Leningrad Oblast, Russia.

== Hesperiidae ==
=== Pyrginae ===
Erynnis tages (Linnaeus, 1758)
Pyrgus alveus (Hübner, 1803)
Pyrgus malvae (Linnaeus, 1758)
Pyrgus serratulae (Rambur, 1839)

=== Hesperiinae ===
Carterocephalus palaemon (Pallas, 1771)
Carterocephalus silvicola (Meigen, 1830)
Hesperia comma (Linnaeus, 1758)
Heteropterus morpheus (Pallas, 1771)
Ochlodes sylvanus (Esper, 1777)
Thymelicus lineola (Ochsenheimer, 1808)
Thymelicus sylvestris (Poda, 1761)

== Papilionidae ==
=== Papilioninae ===
Papilio machaon (Linnaeus, 1758)

=== Parnassiinae ===
Parnassius apollo (Linnaeus, 1758)
Parnassius mnemosyne (Linnaeus, 1758)

== Pieridae ==
=== Pierinae ===
Anthocharis cardamines (Linnaeus, 1758)
Aporia crataegi (Linnaeus, 1758)
Pieris brassicae (Linnaeus, 1758)
Pieris napi (Linnaeus, 1758)
Pieris rapae (Linnaeus, 1758)
Pontia edusa (Fabricius, 1777)

=== Dismorphiinae ===
Leptidea sinapis (Linnaeus, 1758)

=== Coliadinae ===
Colias croceus (Geoffroy in Fourcroy, 1785)
Colias hyale (Linnaeus, 1758)
Colias palaeno (Linnaeus, 1758)
Gonepteryx rhamni (Linnaeus, 1758)

== Nymphalidae ==
=== Nymphalinae ===
Aglais io (Linnaeus, 1758)
Aglais urticae (Linnaeus, 1758)
Araschnia levana (Linnaeus, 1758)
Euphydryas aurinia (Rottemburg, 1775)
Euphydryas maturna (Linnaeus, 1758)
Melitaea athalia (Rottemburg, 1775)
Melitaea aurelia (Nickerl, 1850)
Melitaea cinxia (Linnaeus, 1758)
Melitaea diamina (Lang, 1789)
Melitaea didyma (Esper, 1779)
Melitaea phoebe (Denis & Schiffermüller, 1775)
Nymphalis antiopa (Linnaeus, 1758)
Nymphalis polychloros (Linnaeus, 1758)
Nymphalis vaualbum (Denis & Schiffermüller, 1775)
Nymphalis xanthomelas (Esper, 1781)
Polygonia c-album (Linnaeus, 1758)
Vanessa atalanta (Linnaeus, 1758)
Vanessa cardui (Linnaeus, 1758)

=== Limenitidinae ===
Limenitis camilla (Linnaeus, 1763)
Limenitis populi (Linnaeus, 1758)

=== Apaturinae ===
Apatura ilia (Denis & Shiffermuller, 1775)
Apatura iris (Linnaeus, 1758)

=== Heliconiinae ===
Argynnis laodice (Pallas, 1771)
Argynnis paphia (Linnaeus, 1758)
Boloria aquilonaris (Stichel, 1908)
Boloria dia (Linnaeus, 1767)
Boloria eunomia (Esper, 1799)
Boloria euphrosyne (Linnaeus, 1758)
Boloria freija (Becklin in Thunberg, 1791)
Boloria frigga (Becklin in Thunberg, 1791)
Boloria selene (Denis & Schiffermuller, 1775)
Boloria thore (Hübner, 1803)
Boloria titania (Esper, 1793)
Brenthis ino (Rottemburg, 1775)
Fabriciana adippe (Denis & Schiffermüller, 1775)
Fabriciana niobe (Linnaeus, 1758)
Issoria lathonia (Linnaeus, 1758)
Speyeria aglaja (Linnaeus, 1758)

=== Satyrinae ===
Aphantopus hyperantus (Linnaeus, 1758)
Coenonympha glycerion (Borkhausen, 1788)
Coenonympha hero (Linnaeus, 1761)
Coenonympha pamphilus (Linnaeus, 1758)
Coenonympha tullia (Müller, 1764)
Erebia embla (Becklin in Thunberg, 1791)
Erebia ligea (Linnaeus, 1758)
Hipparchia semele (Linnaeus, 1758)
Hyponephele lycaon (Rottemburg, 1775)
Lasiommata maera (Linnaeus, 1758)
Lasiommata megera (Linnaeus, 1767)
Lasiommata petropolitana (Fabricius, 1787)
Lopinga achine (Scopoli, 1763)
Maniola jurtina (Linnaeus, 1758)
Oeneis jutta (Hübner, 1806)
Pararge aegeria (Linnaeus, 1758)

== Lycaenidae ==
=== Theclinae ===
Callophrys rubi (Linnaeus, 1758)
Neozephyrus quercus (Linnaeus, 1758)
Satyrium pruni (Linnaeus, 1758)
Satyrium w-album (Knoch, 1782)
Thecla betulae (Linnaeus, 1758)

=== Lycaeninae ===
Lycaena alciphron (Rottemburg, 1775)
Lycaena dispar (Haworth, 1803)
Lycaena helle (Denis & Schiffermuller, 1775)
Lycaena hippothoe (Linnaeus, 1761)
Lycaena phlaeas (Linnaeus, 1761)
Lycaena virgaureae (Linnaeus, 1758)

=== Polyommatinae ===
Agriades optilete (Knoch, 1781)
Aricia artaxerxes allous (Fabricius, 1775)
Celastrina argiolus (Linnaeus, 1758)
Cupido alcetas (Hoffmannsegg, 1804)
Cupido argiades (Pallas, 1771)
Cupido minimus (Fuessly, 1775)
Cyaniris semiargus (Rottemburg, 1775)
Eumedonia eumedon (Esper, 1780)
Glaucopsyche alexis (Poda, 1761)
Phengaris alcon (Denis & Schiffermuller, 1775)
Phengaris arion (Linnaeus, 1758)
Plebejus argus (Linnaeus, 1758)
Plebejus idas (Linnaeus, 1761)
Polyommatus amandus (Schneider, 1792)
Polyommatus damon (Denis & Schiffermuller, 1775)
Polyommatus icarus (Rottemburg, 1775)
Pseudophilotes vicrama (Moore, 1865)

== See also ==
- List of butterflies of Russia

== Sources ==
- Цветков Е.В. Булавоусые чешуекрылые Санкт-Петербурга и Ленинградской области. Compact Disc, 2005.
