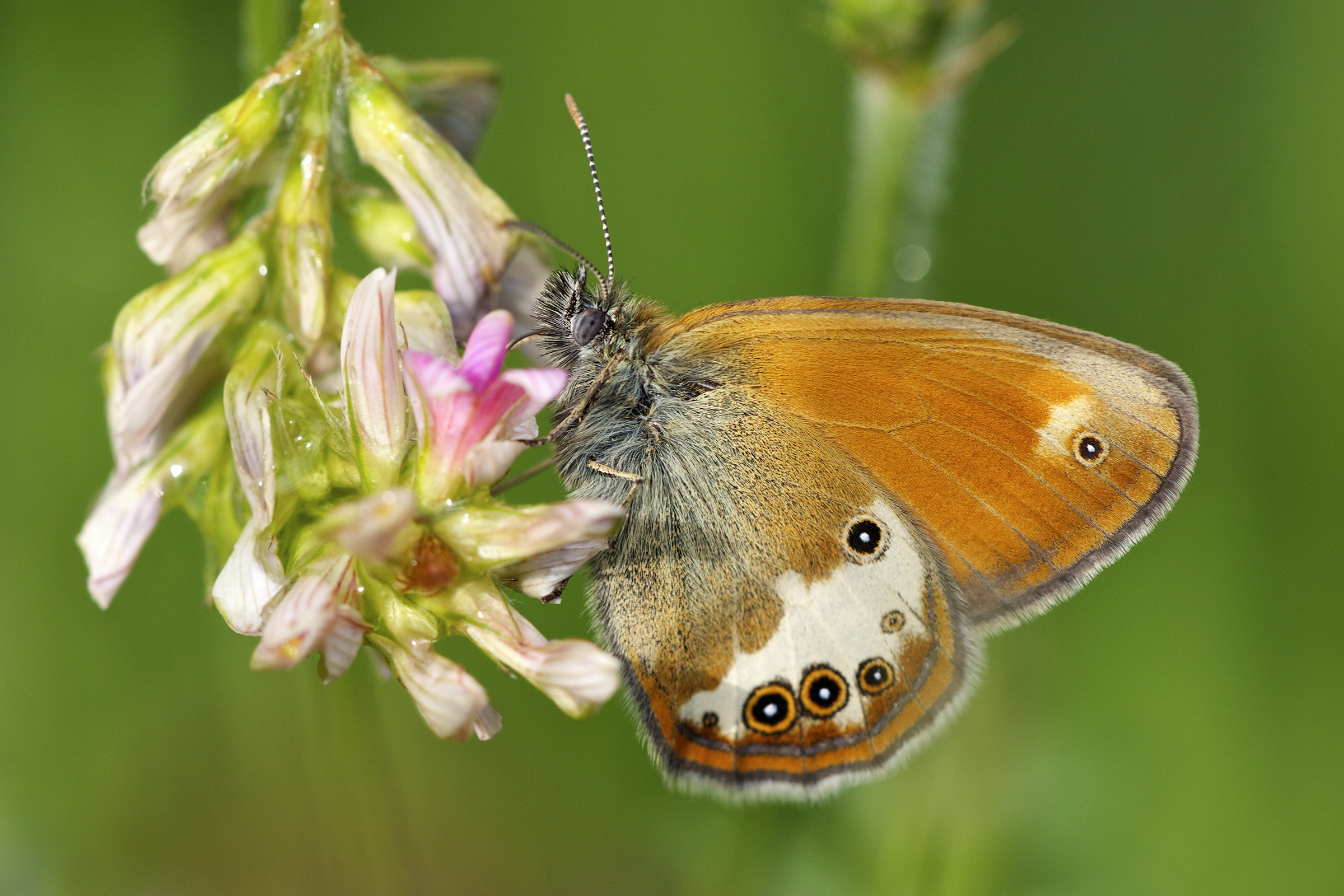

Scientific classification
- Kingdom: Animalia
- Phylum: Arthropoda
- Clade: Pancrustacea
- Class: Insecta
- Order: Lepidoptera
- Family: Nymphalidae
- Genus: Coenonympha
- Species: C. arcania

Binomial name
- Coenonympha arcania Linnaeus, 1761

= Coenonympha arcania =

Species of butterfly

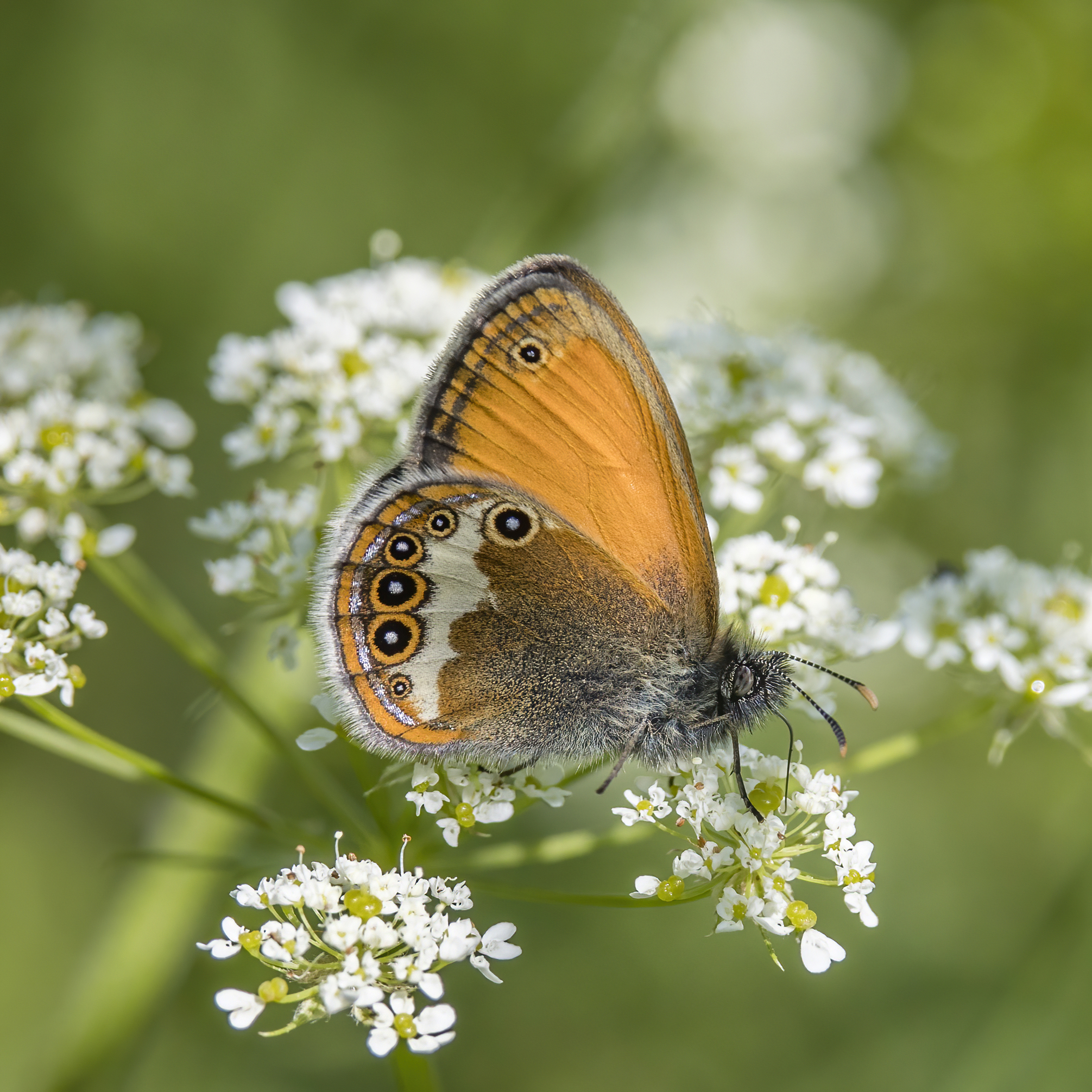
Aberration insubrica

Coenonympha arcania, the pearly heath, is a butterfly species belonging to the family Nymphalidae.

== Distribution ==
It can be found in Central Europe, and Scandinavia.

== Description ==
It resembles Coenonympha hero. Seitz describes it thus C. arcania L. (48 d). Forewing fiery reddish yellow with black distal margin, hindwing dark brown. Easily recognised by the underside of the hindwing, whose marginal portion is occupied by a broad white band, which in the nymotypical form interrupts the row of ocelli below the apical eye, the latter therefore appearing to be placed on the inside of the white band. All Europe except Great Britain, from Scandinavia to the Mediterranean sea and from Spain and France to the Black sea and Armenia. — Specimens with a very broadly black margin to the forewing and a narrowed and slightly dentate band on the underside of the hindwing, which probably occur among nymotypical specimens everywhere, but especially in the South, are considered as ab. insubrica Frey [ var.](48 d). — Larva green with dark dorsal stripe bordered with a yellowish tint, light subdorsal stripe and pale yellow lateral stripe; head blue-green, mouth and anal fork red. Until May on grasses. Pupa brown, with whitish wing-cases edged with red. Butterflies very common in June and July and often flying together in large numbers. At the edge of woods full of undergrowth, but also in the open country and on hills. They affect flying round bushes and settle on the tip of low twigs, but sometimes also fly up into the higher branches of trees. The females are much less numerous than the males and appear later.

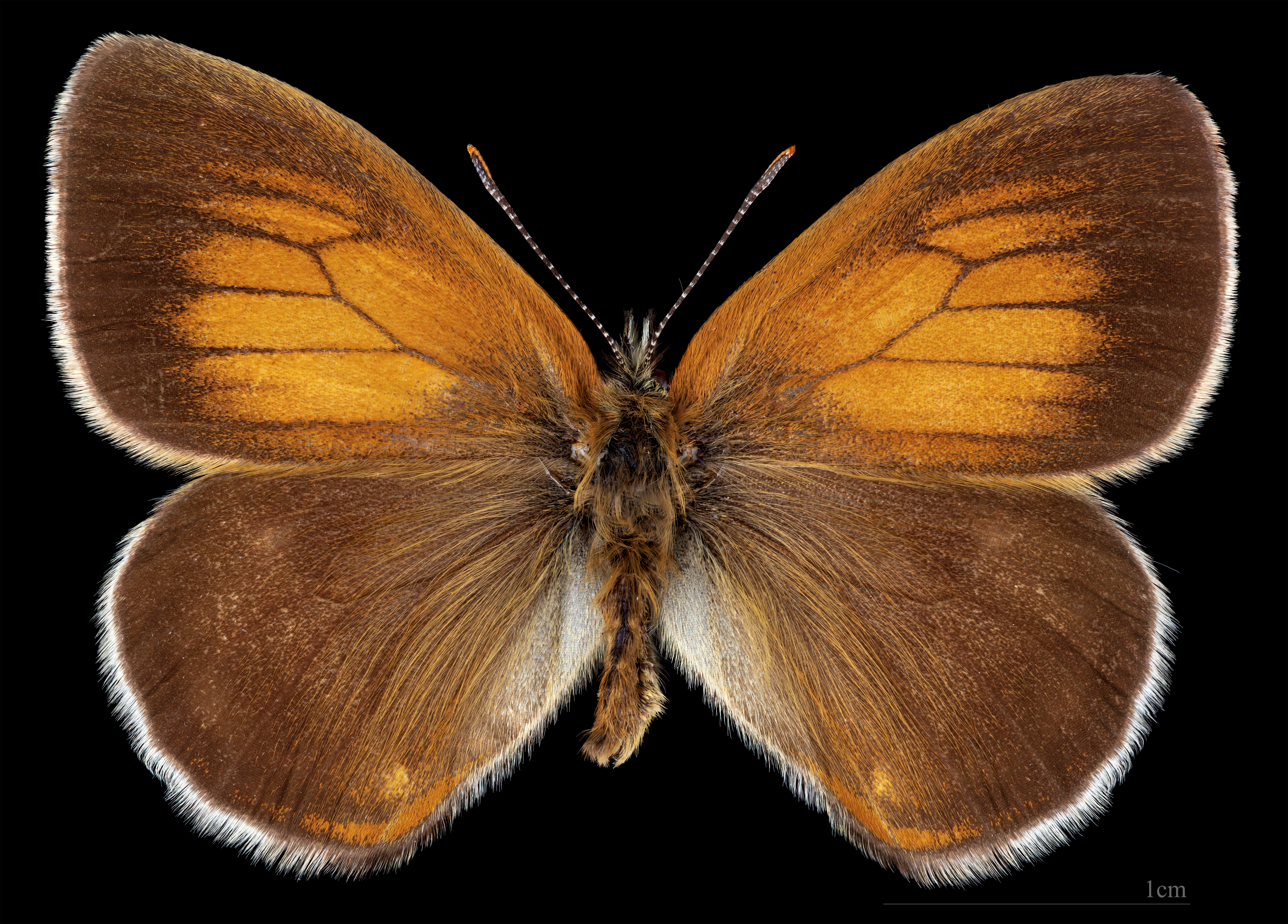
Coenonympha arcania ♂

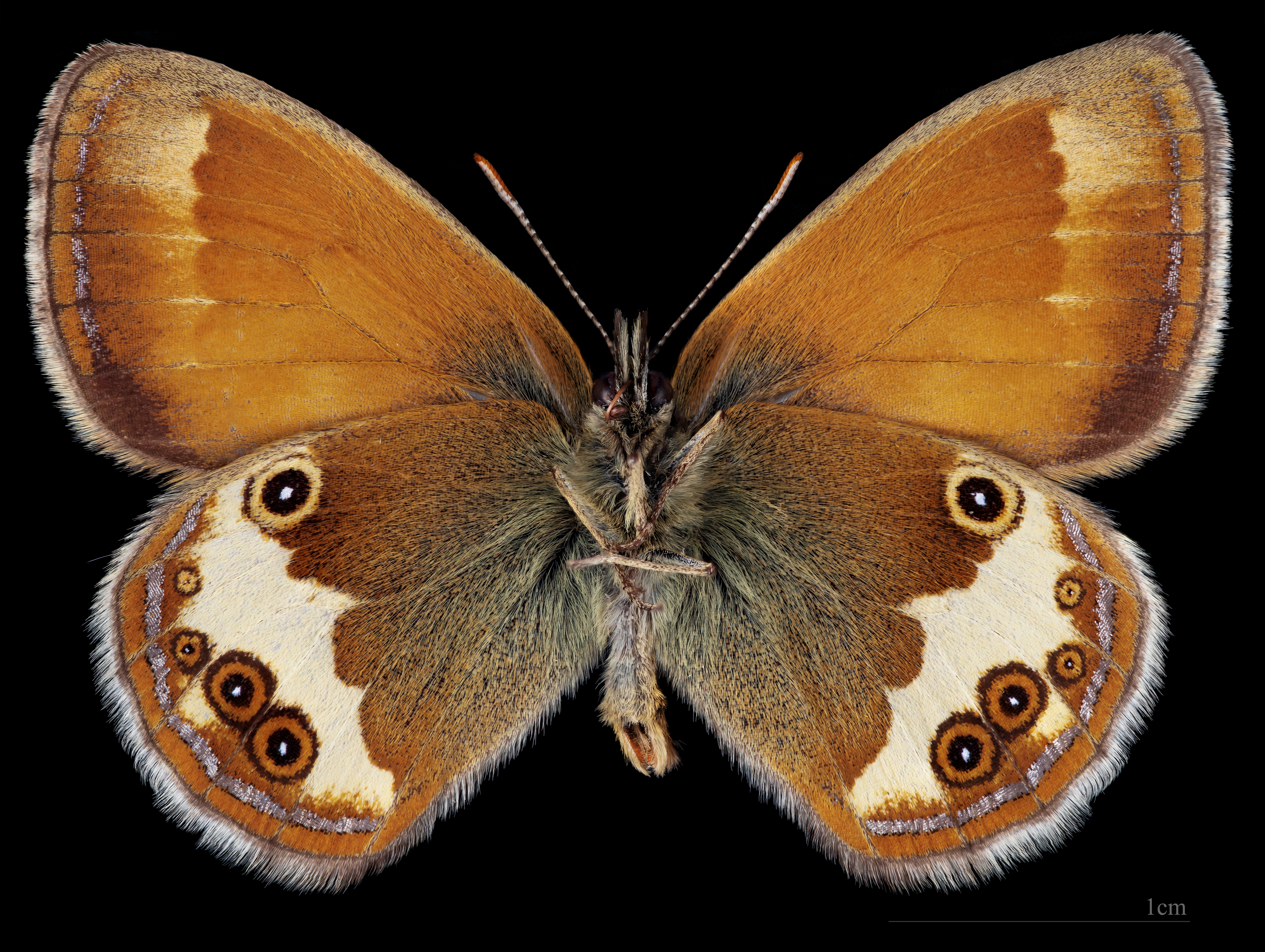
Coenonympha arcania ♂ △

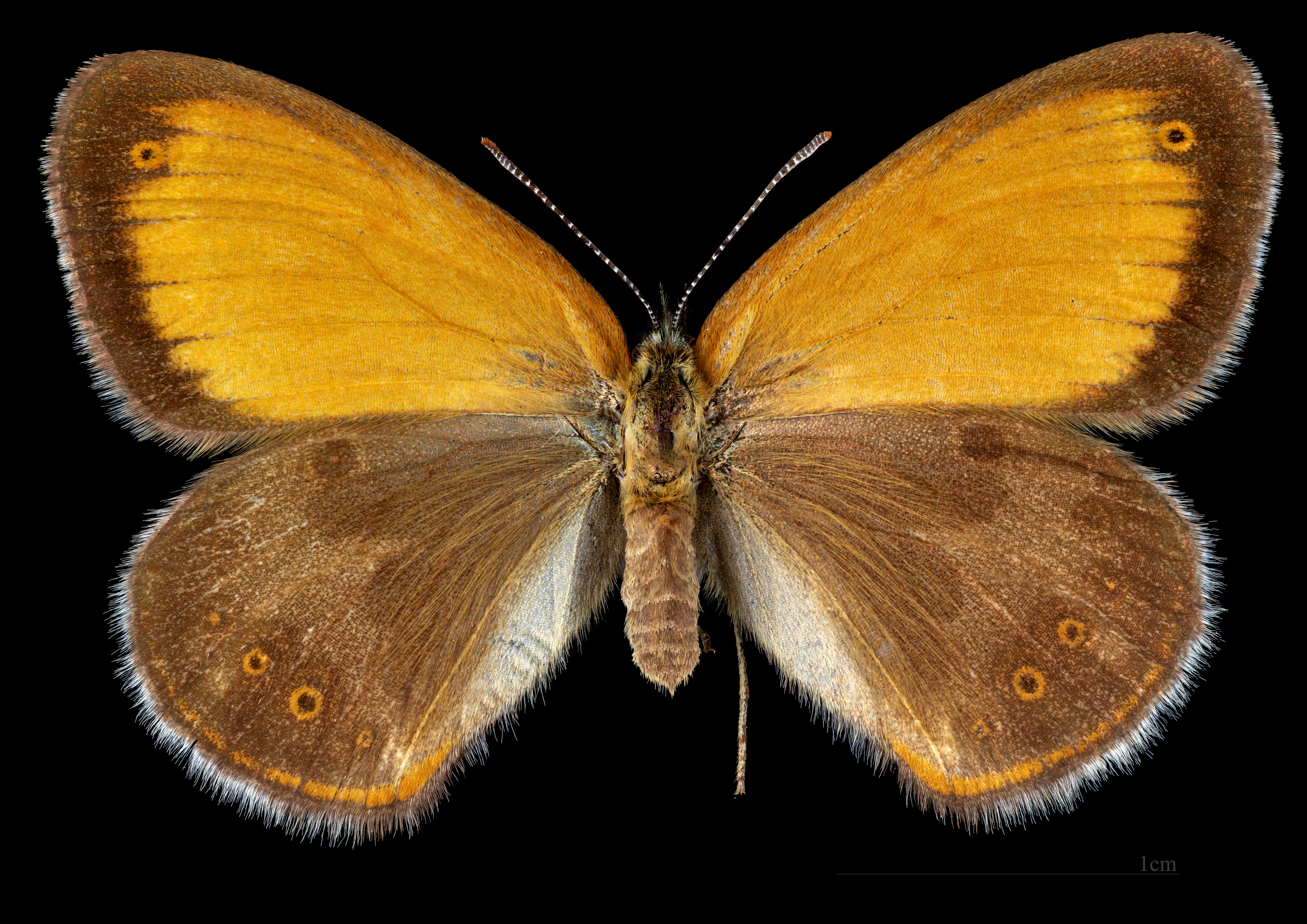
Coenonympha arcania ♀

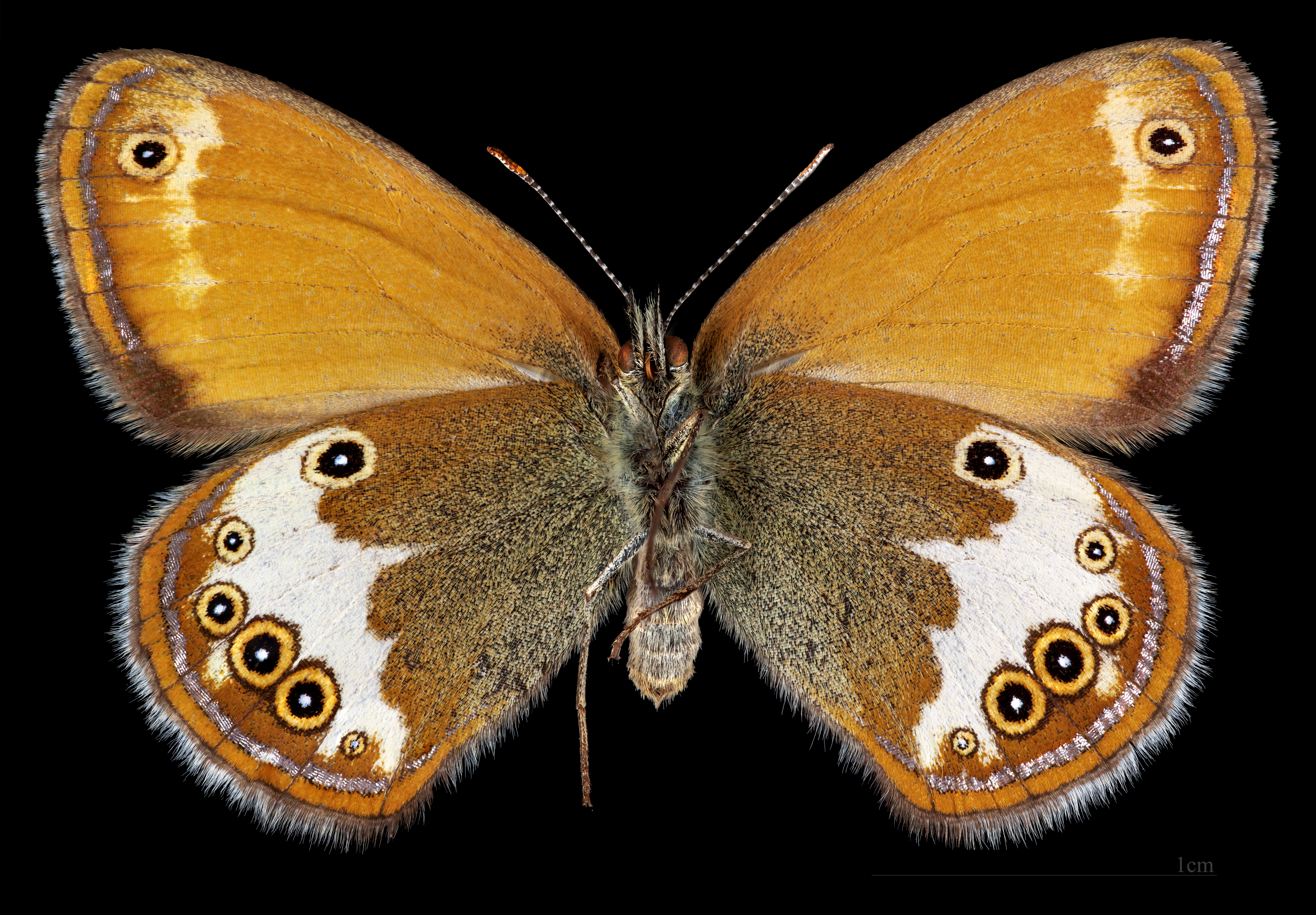
Coenonympha arcania ♀ △

== Biology ==
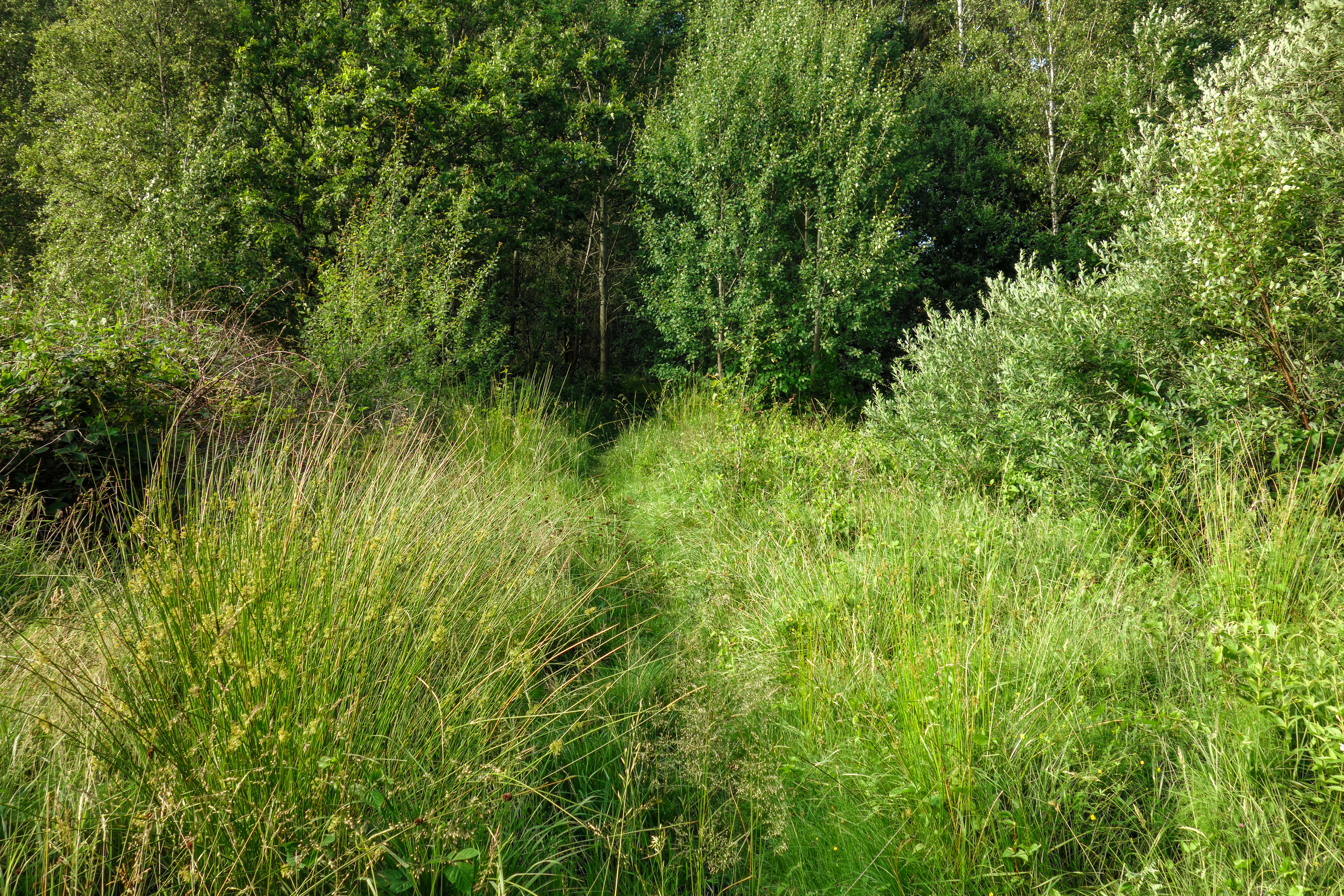
Pearly heath habitat

Depending on the temperature, they are found an altitude of up to 1,800 meters. They are found almost everywhere, preferring to live in sun-drenched and lightly wooded forests and on forest edges and on bushy, dry grasslands.

The butterflies fly in one generation from May to August. They usually sit in sunny spots with their wings closed.

The larvae feed on various grasses including Holcus lanatus and Festuca ovina.The females lay their eggs individually or in small groups on the stalks of the forage plants. The caterpillars overwinter young.

== Etymology ==
From Latin Arcania - mysterious, secretive.
