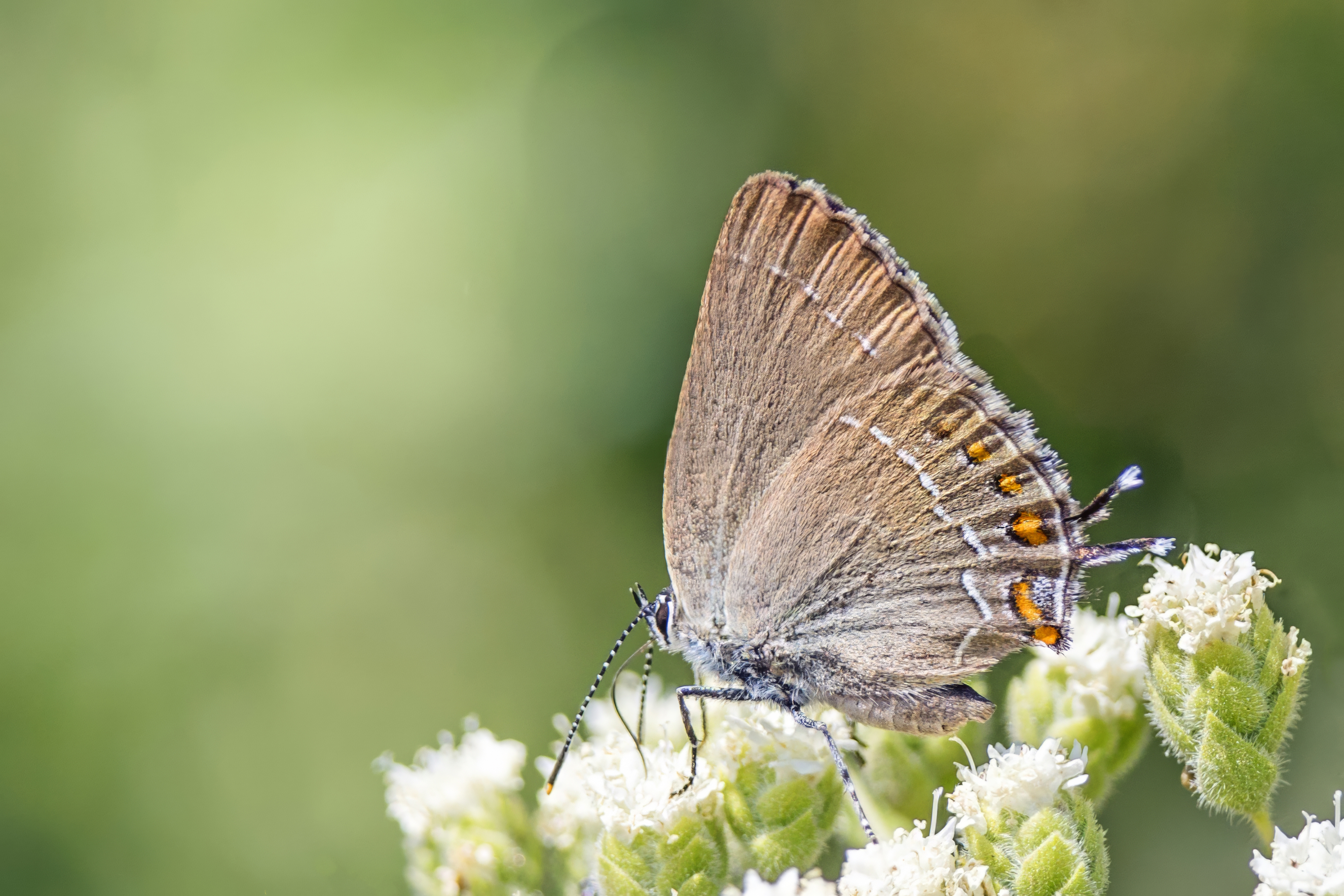
- in Turkey

Scientific classification
- Kingdom: Animalia
- Phylum: Arthropoda
- Clade: Pancrustacea
- Class: Insecta
- Order: Lepidoptera
- Family: Lycaenidae
- Genus: Satyrium
- Species: S. ilicis

Binomial name
- Satyrium ilicis Esper, 1779

Synonyms
- Papilio ilicis Esper, 1779; Papilio lynceus Fabricius, 1787; Thecla caudatula Zeller, 1847; Thecla bischoffii Gerhard, 1850; Thecla bischoffii cilicica (Holtz, 1897); Thecla syra Pfeiffer, 1932; Thecla syra pinoptas (Zerny, 1932)

= Satyrium ilicis =

Ilex hairstreak

Species of butterfly

Satyrium ilicis, the ilex hairstreak, is a butterfly of the family Lycaenidae.

== Distribution and habitat ==
This species is present in Southern and Central Europe, in Asia Minor, Caucasus, Transcaucasia, Lebanon, in South Western Siberia, and Southern Urals. It inhabits woods up to 1600 m in elevation.

== Description ==
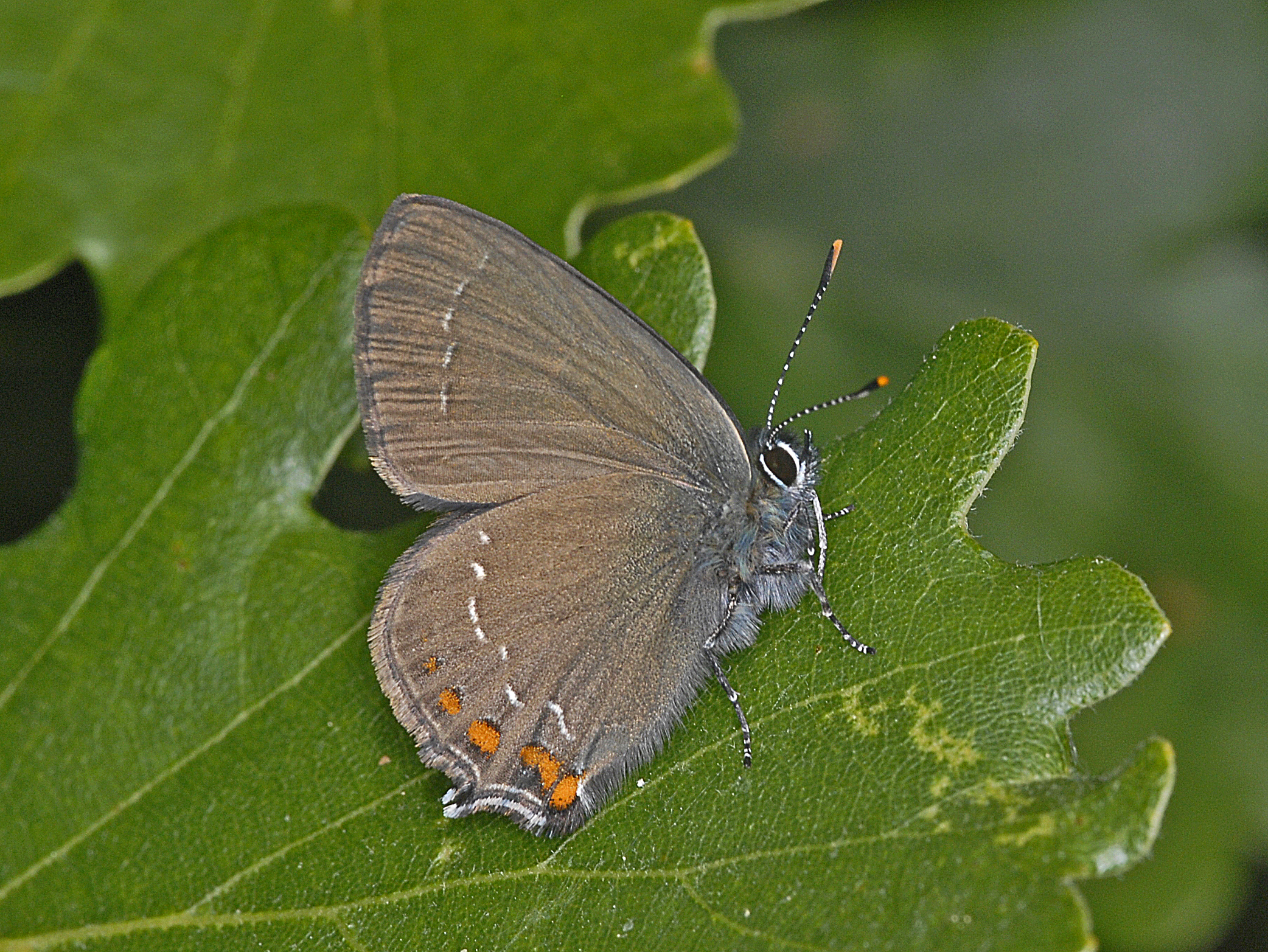
Ilex hairstreak

Satyrium ilicis has a wingspan of 32–36 mm. The basic color of the wings is brownish. In the females the upperside of the forewings usually shows large patches of orange, while on the underside of the hindwings there are orange black bordered lunules. A series of irregular broken white markings are present on the underside of the forewings and hindwings. On the hindwings are present two short tails. Larvae are pale green, about 2 cm long.

== Biology ==
It is a univoltine species. Adults fly from Late May to Early August. Caterpillars feed on oaks (especially Quercus robur, Quercus coccifera, Quercus ilex, Quercus petraea, Quercus pubescens), elms (Ulmus species), Rhamnus cathartica and Prunus. Larvae are attended by ants Camponotus aethiops and Crematogaster species.
