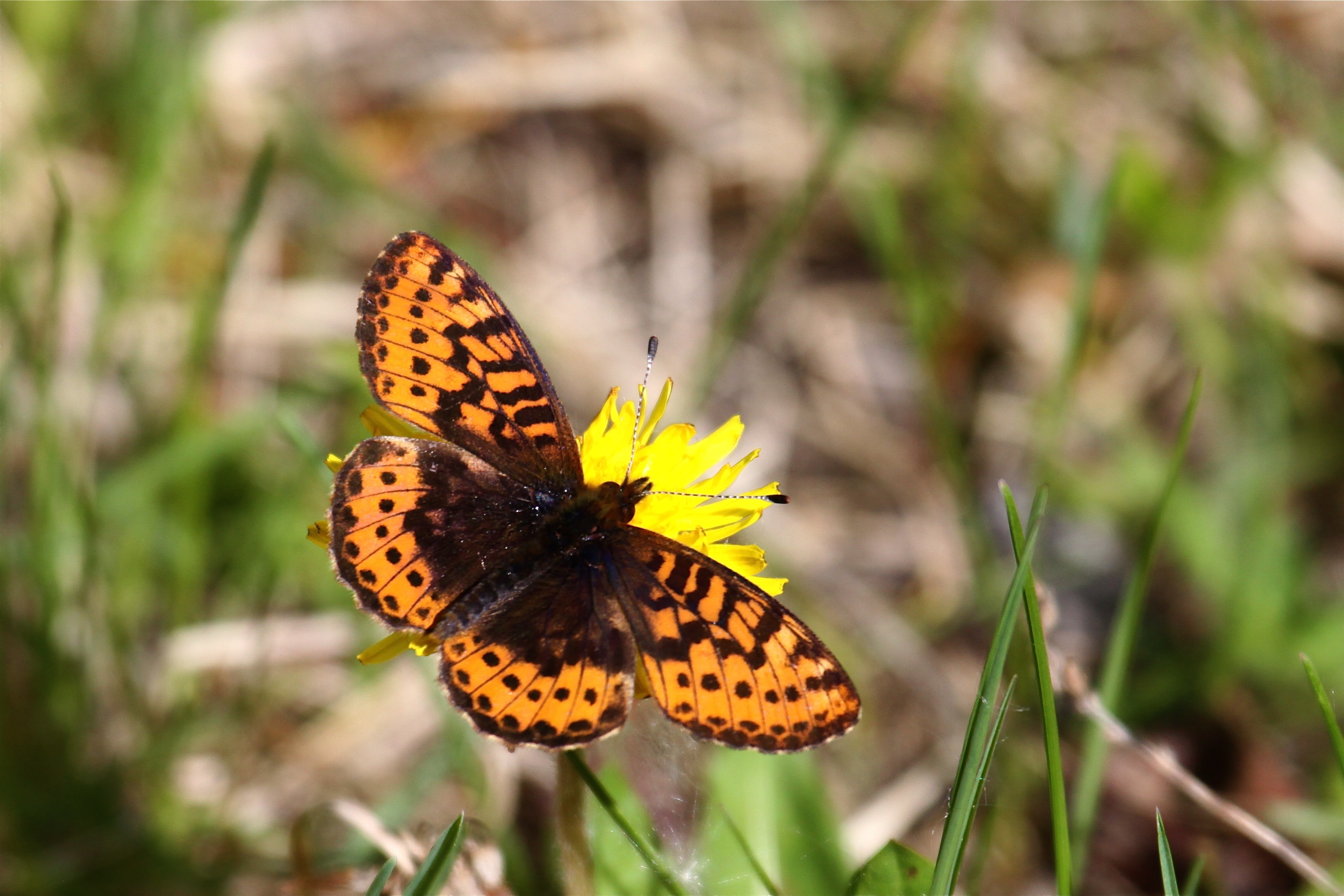
- in Alberta

Scientific classification
- Domain: Eukaryota
- Kingdom: Animalia
- Phylum: Arthropoda
- Class: Insecta
- Order: Lepidoptera
- Family: Nymphalidae
- Genus: Boloria
- Species: B. frigga

Binomial name
- Boloria frigga Becklin in Thunberg, 1791)

Synonyms
- Clossiana frigga

= Boloria frigga =

Frigga fritillary

Species of butterfly

Boloria frigga, the Frigga fritillary, is a butterfly of the family Nymphalidae with a circumboreal distribution. It occurs in bogs and tundra in Northern Europe to the north of 60° N, very locally in more southern locations, as well as in the Urals, Siberia, Northern Mongolia, the Russian Far East, western parts of the United States and Canada.

== Description ==
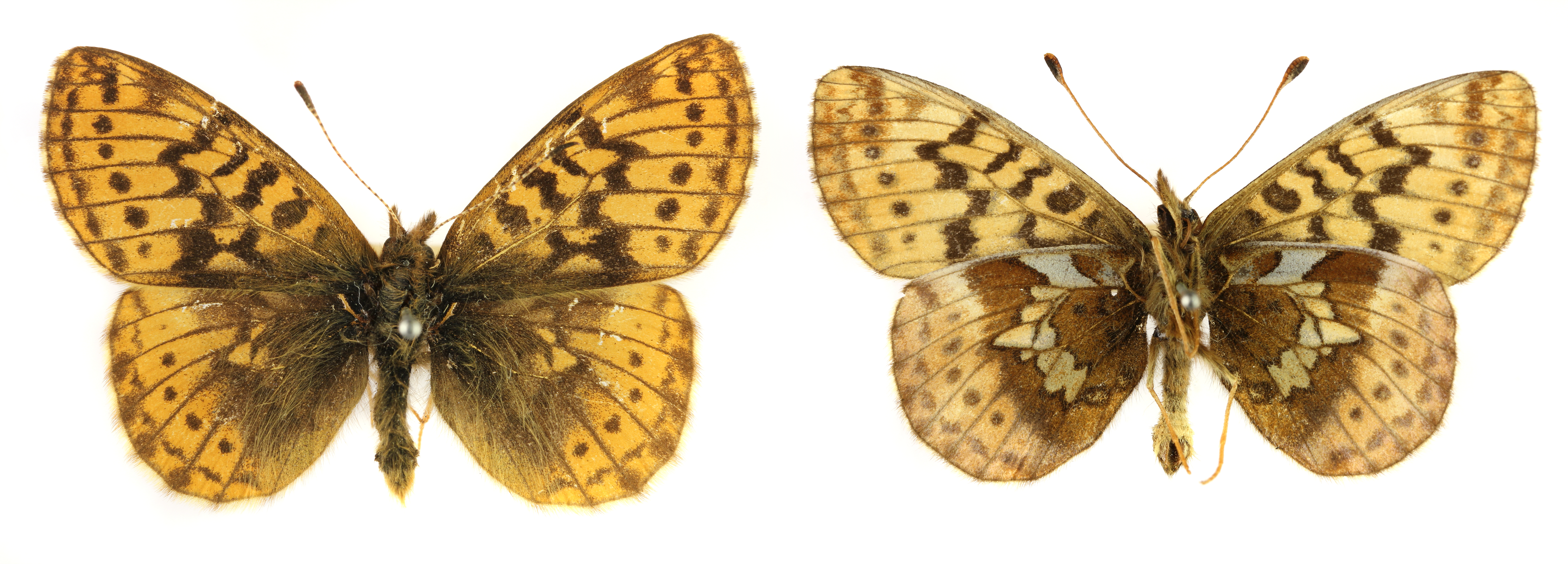
specimen from Sweden

Seitz A. frigga Thnbg. (68e). Above pale reddish yellow, the black markings in the central and marginal areas very straight, being parallel with the distal margin. The under surface is very characteristic on account of the broad cinnamon margin of the forewing and the but little variegated hindwing, only the paler distal margin of the latter somewhat contrasting with the cinnamon basal area. The median band, like the ground dusted with cinnamon, is but slightly prominent, only an irregularly rhomboidal pale spot before the middle of the costa being conspicuous. Its habitats include willow and sphagnum bogs.

== Biology ==
Larvae feed on Rubus chamaemorus, Vaccinium oxycoccos and occasionally on Vaccinium uliginosum. In experimentation they accept Polygonum viviparum and Rubus fruticosus. The species produces one generation every two years.

== Etymology ==
Frigg is a goddess in Norse mythology.
