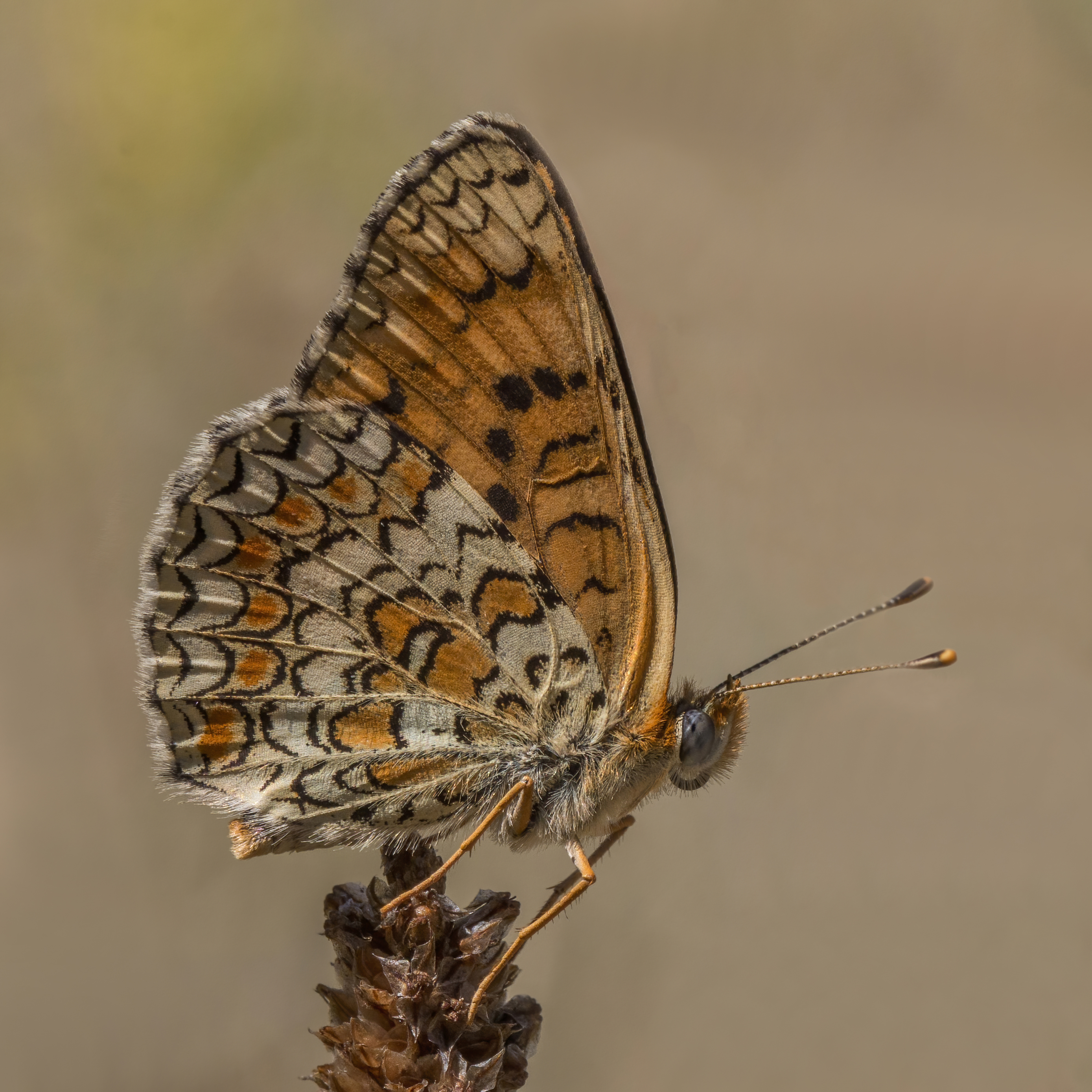
- Male
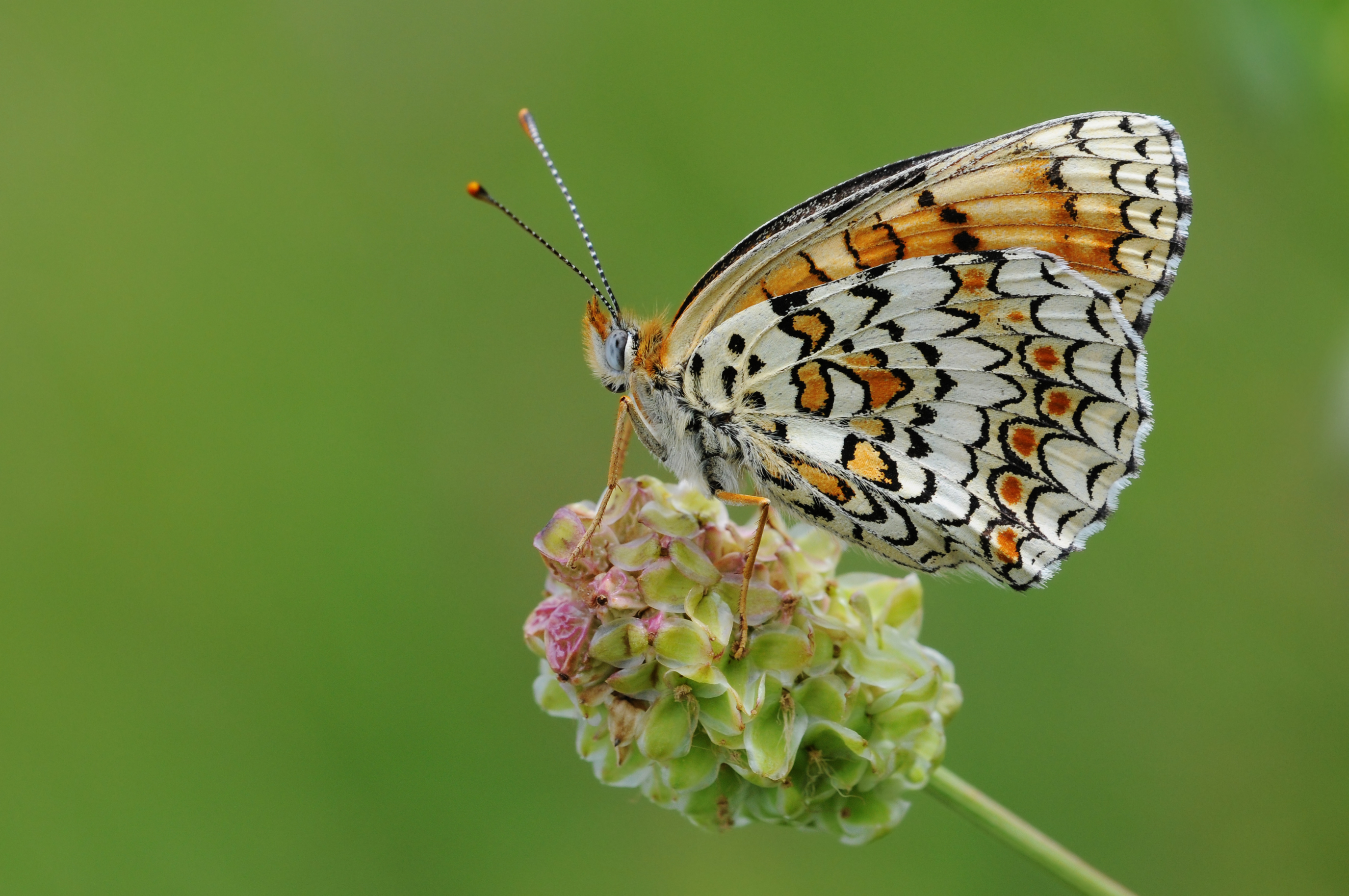
- Female

Conservation status
- Least Concern (IUCN 3.1)

Scientific classification
- Kingdom: Animalia
- Phylum: Arthropoda
- Clade: Pancrustacea
- Class: Insecta
- Order: Lepidoptera
- Family: Nymphalidae
- Genus: Melitaea
- Species: M. phoebe

Binomial name
- Melitaea phoebe (Denis & Schiffermüller, 1775)

Synonyms
- Papilio phoebe Denis & Schiffermüller, 1775

= Melitaea phoebe =

Knapweed fritillary

Species of butterfly

Melitaea phoebe, also known as the knapweed fritillary, is a butterfly of the family Nymphalidae. It is found in the Palearctic realm, including most of Europe and North Africa, excluding the United Kingdom and Scandinavia. Previously, it also included Melitaea telona, which was recently revalidated as a distinct cryptic species.

== Description ==
M. phoebe butterflies have a wingspan of 34 to 50 mm. Their forewings are more pointed than the eastern knapweed fritillary, but are equally variable in color and distinctive markings. Their black markings are usually joined, but may instead cover a majority of the wing or very little of it.

The species features a reddish-yellow submarginal lunate (crescent-shaped) spot between the two median veins that reaches its vertex, considerably further into the disc than the other yellow lunate spots. This pattern is present on both the forewings and the hindwings. Additionally, the submarginal lunule between the first and second median veins projects further basal than the other lunules of the same row. Wheeler (1903) gives a short description.

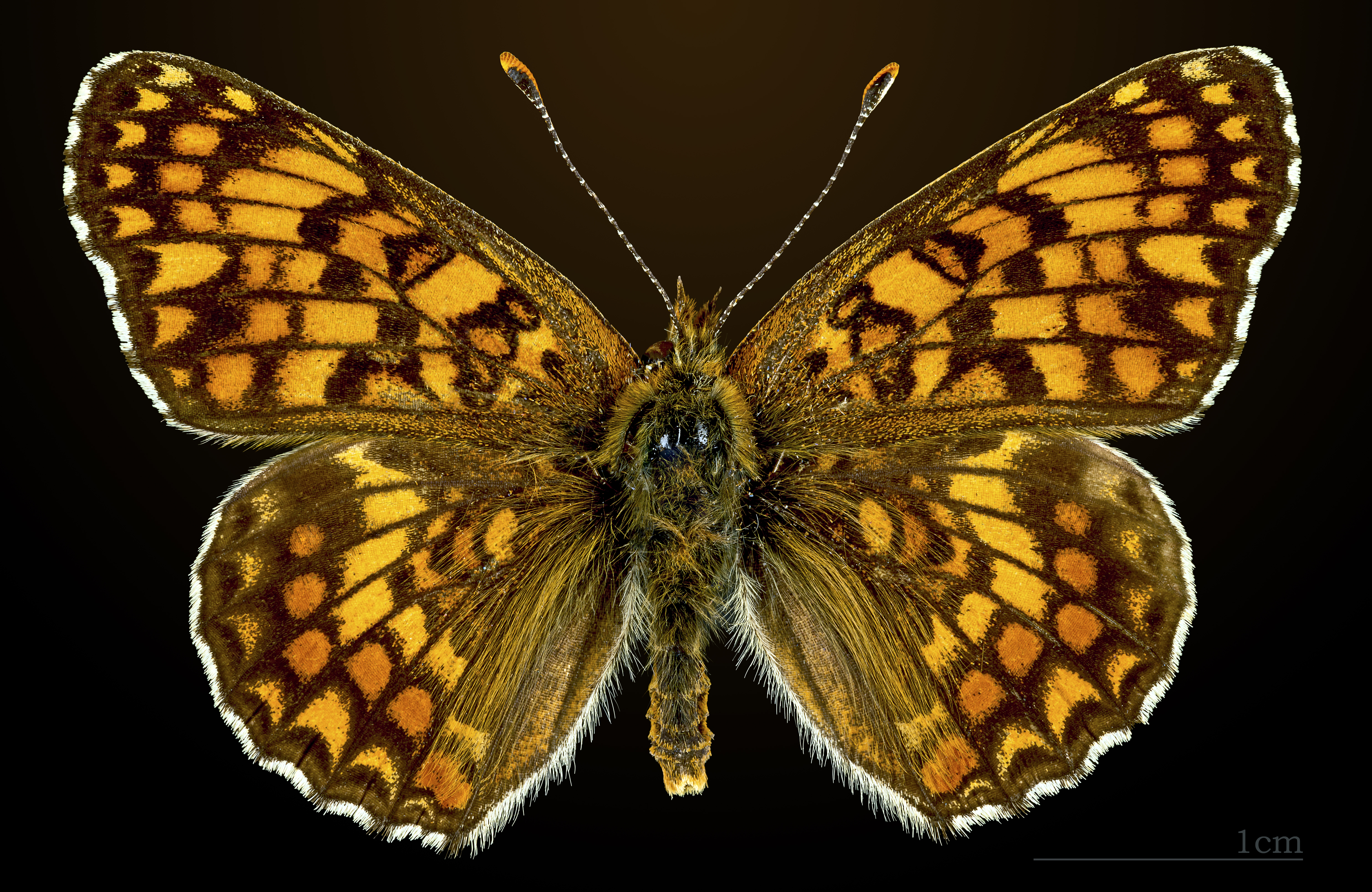
Male

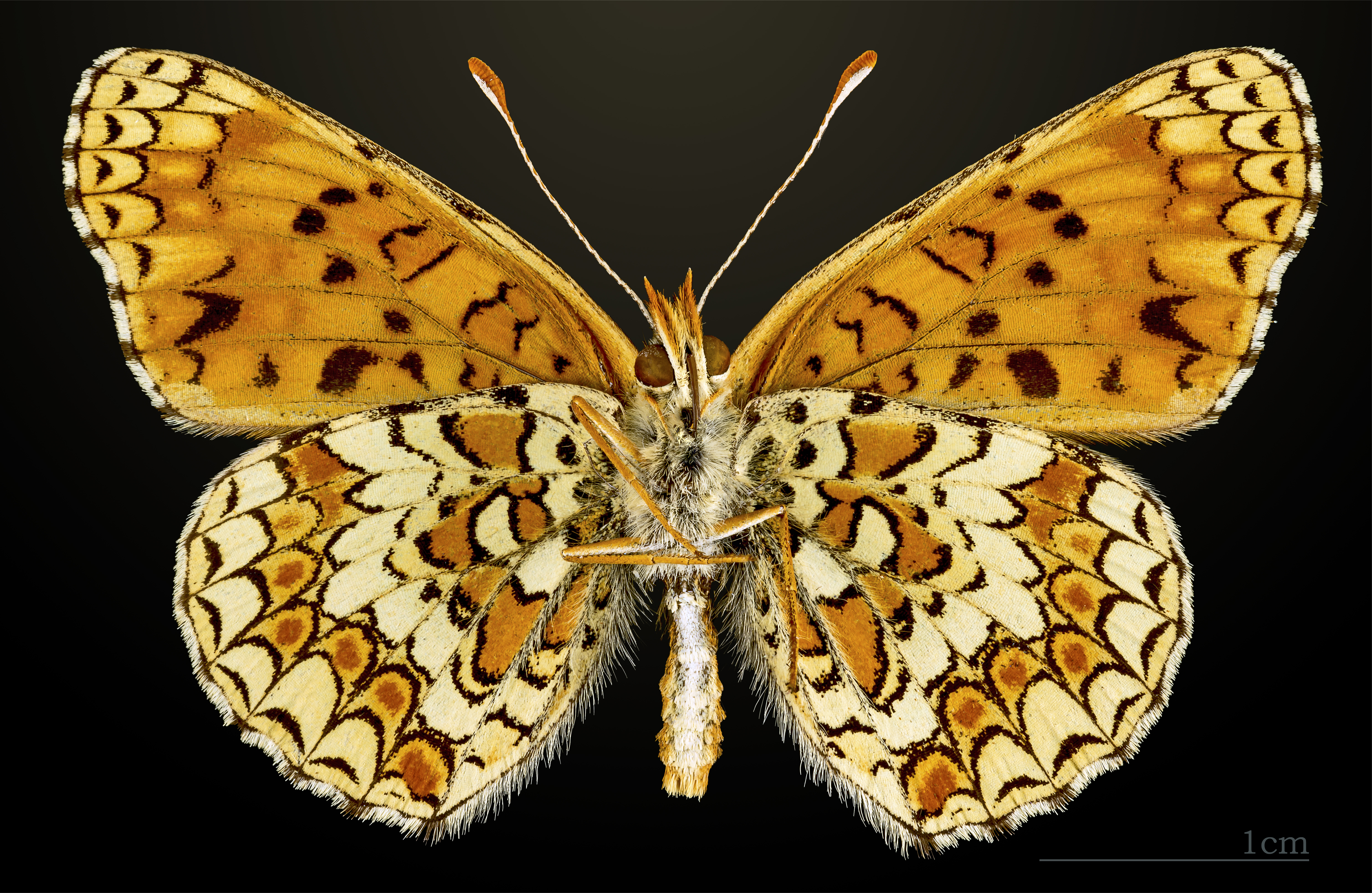
Male underside

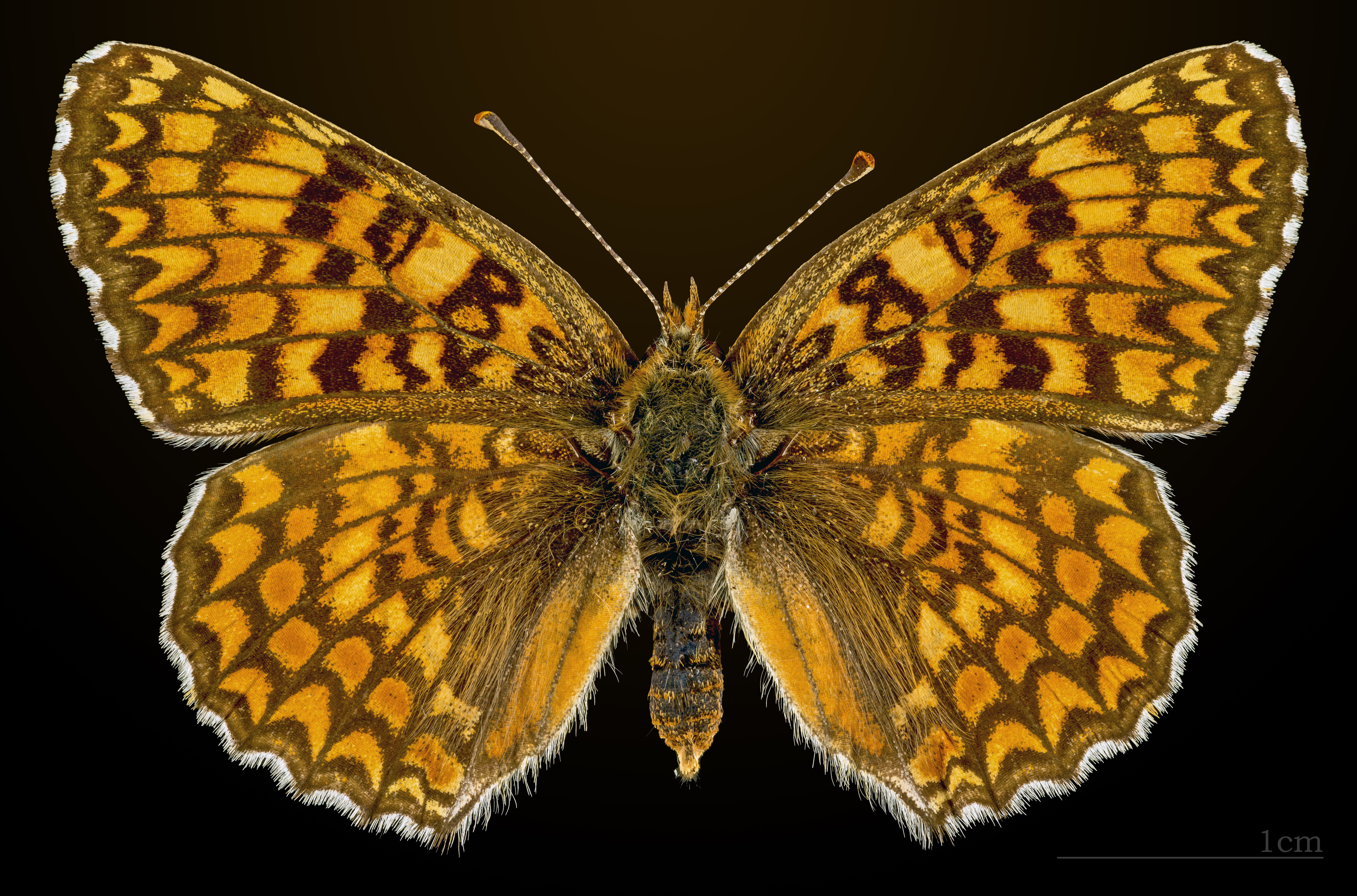
Female

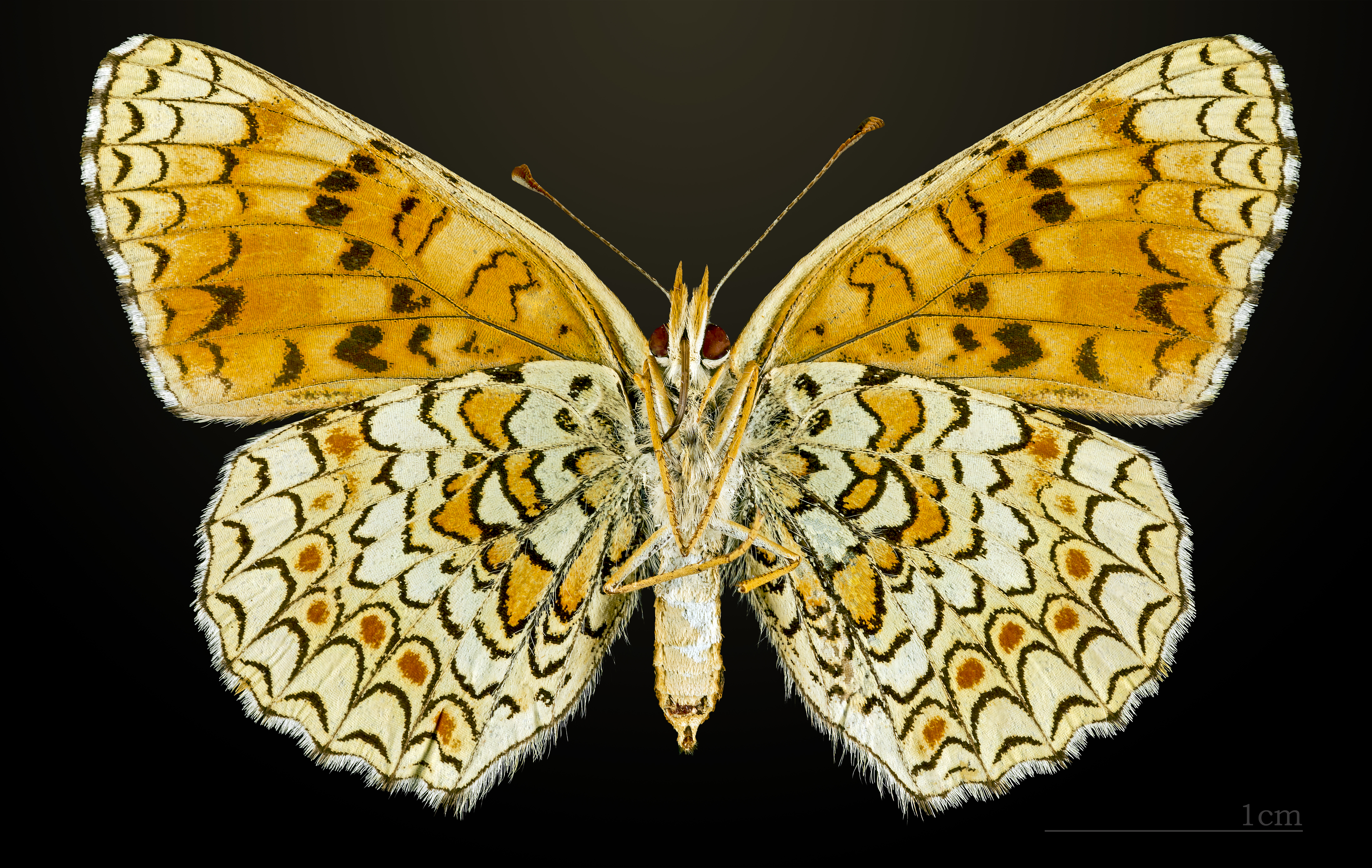
Female underside
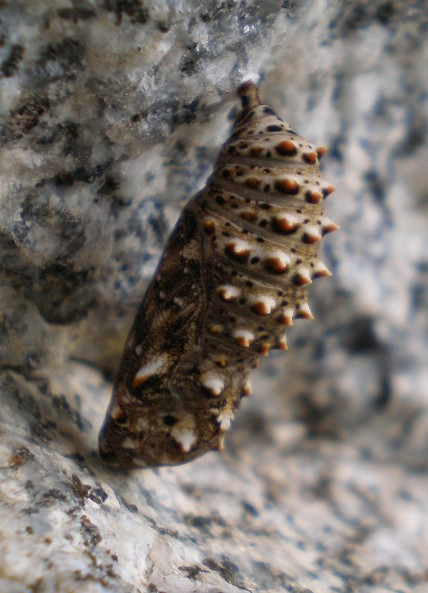
Pupa

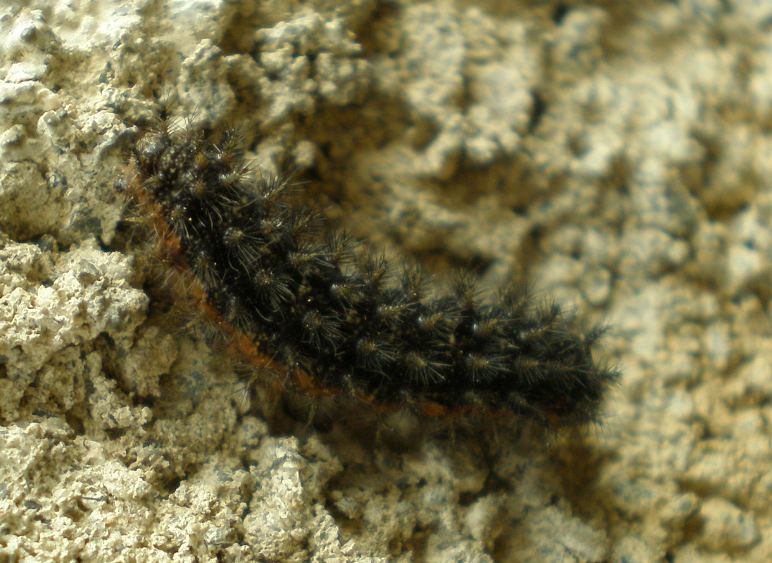
Larva

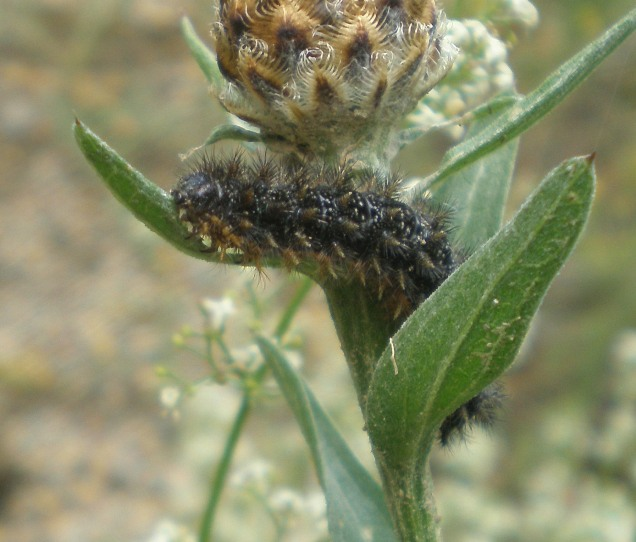
Larva

M. phoebe pupae are a dull yellow-brown colour, with dark yellow and black markings. The larvae are grey with a black head, soft red-brown branched thorns, blackish dorsal lines, and numerous small white dots.

== Biology ==
M. phoebe is active from April to September, depending on the location. The larvae feed on Plantago and Centaurea species (including Centaurea jacea).

== Distribution and habitat ==
M. phoebe is present throughout Europe except for the northern regions such as England, Ireland, Northern France, Germany, Poland, Holland, Belgium and Scandinavia. It can also be found in North Africa: Morocco and Algeria, Turkey, Siberia, and Central Asia in Mongolia and northern China included.

M. phoebe inhabits flowery meadows and plains, but may just also be found in stonier places such as rocky hills.

== Etymology ==
Named in the classical tradition, Phoebe is—in Greek mythology—one of the first generation of Titans, the children of Uranus and Gaia. The species Melitaea phoebe was described by entomologists Johann Nepomuk Cosmas, Michael Denis and Ignaz Schiffermüller in 1779, under the initial name Papilio phoebe.
