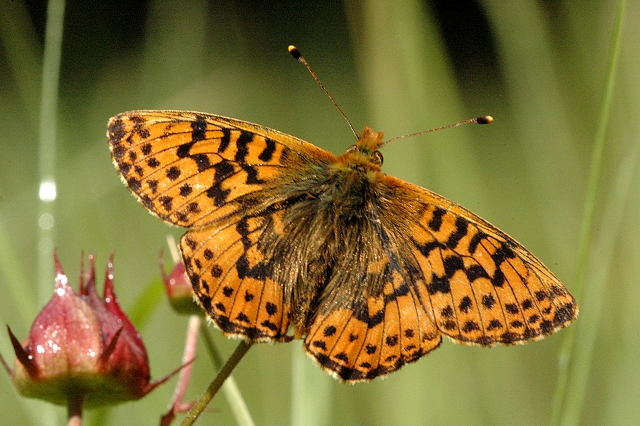

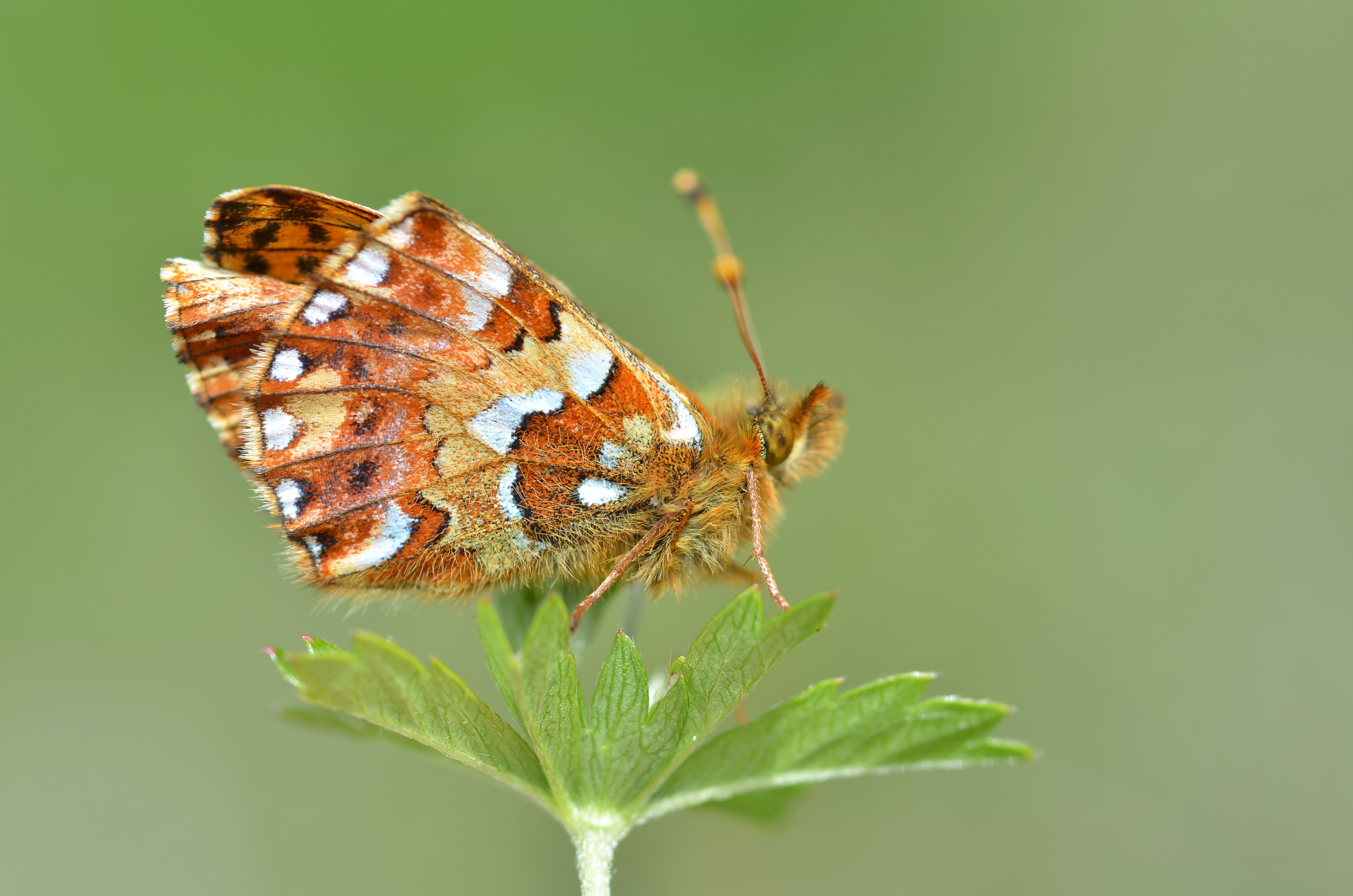

Scientific classification
- Domain: Eukaryota
- Kingdom: Animalia
- Phylum: Arthropoda
- Class: Insecta
- Order: Lepidoptera
- Family: Nymphalidae
- Genus: Boloria
- Species: B. aquilonaris

Binomial name
- Boloria aquilonaris Stichel, 1908

= Boloria aquilonaris =

Cranberry fritillary

Species of butterfly

Boloria aquilonaris, the cranberry fritillary, is a butterfly of the family Nymphalidae. It is found in northern and central Europe.

== Description ==
The wingspan is 34–40 mm. Upperside orange with brown basal suffusion and adorned with various marks of brown colour, submarginal round spots and lines forming festoons.

The underside of the forewing is lighter and more coloured, that of the hindwing reddish and presenting silver spots.

== Biology ==
The butterfly flies from June to August depending on the location. The larvae feed on cranberry and Andromeda polifolia.

== Gallery ==
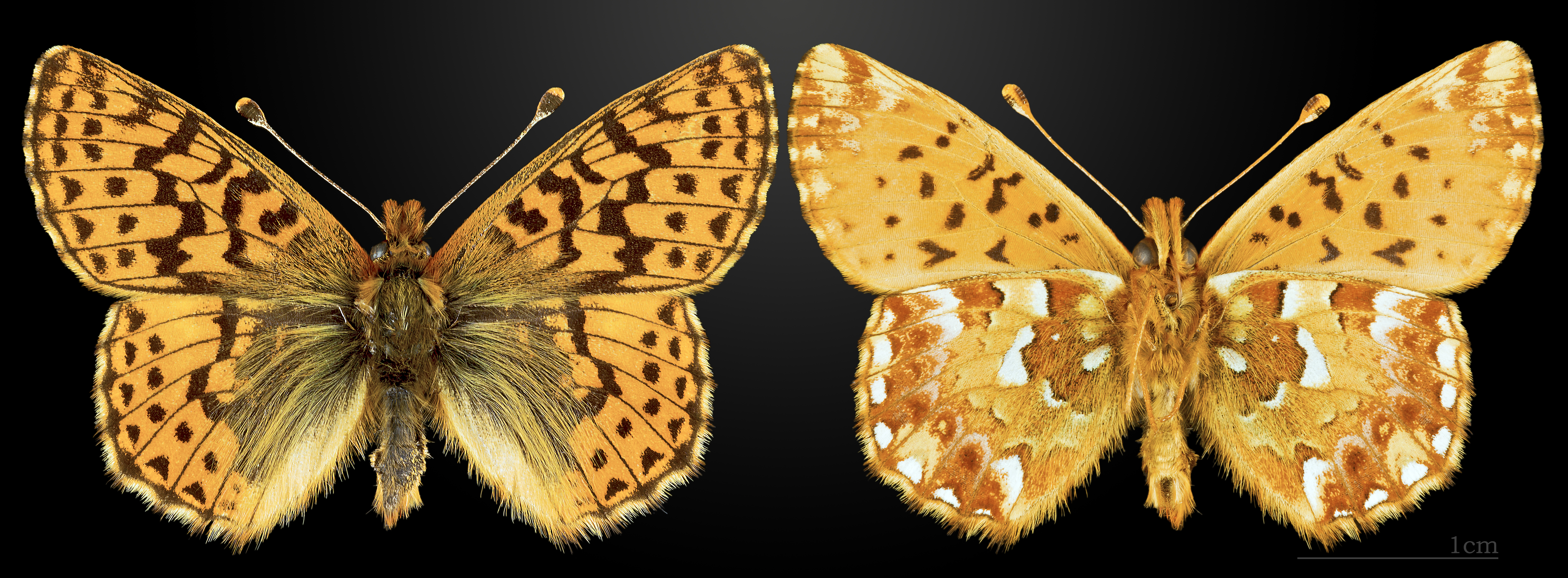
Both sides

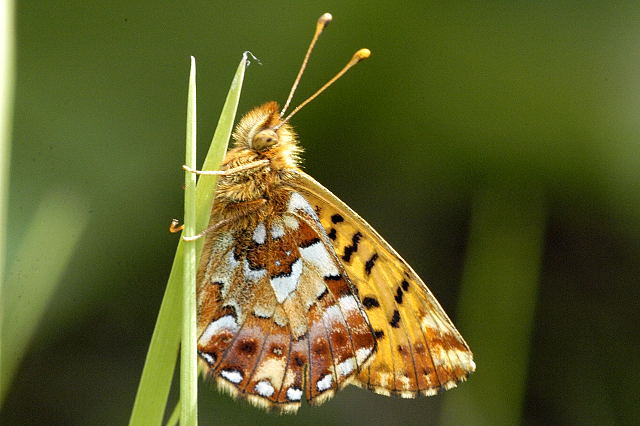

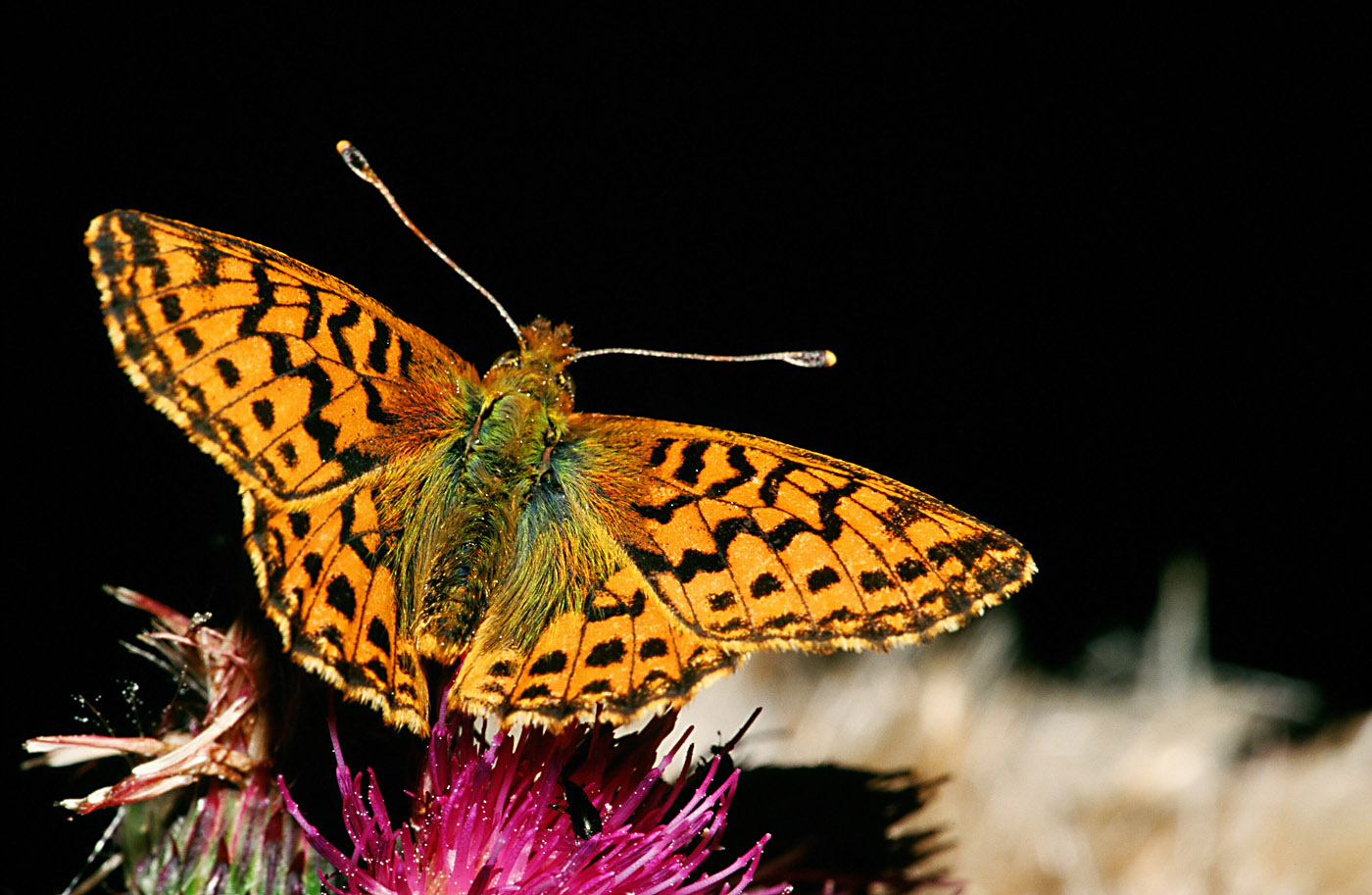
June, 1998 in Saxony, Germany

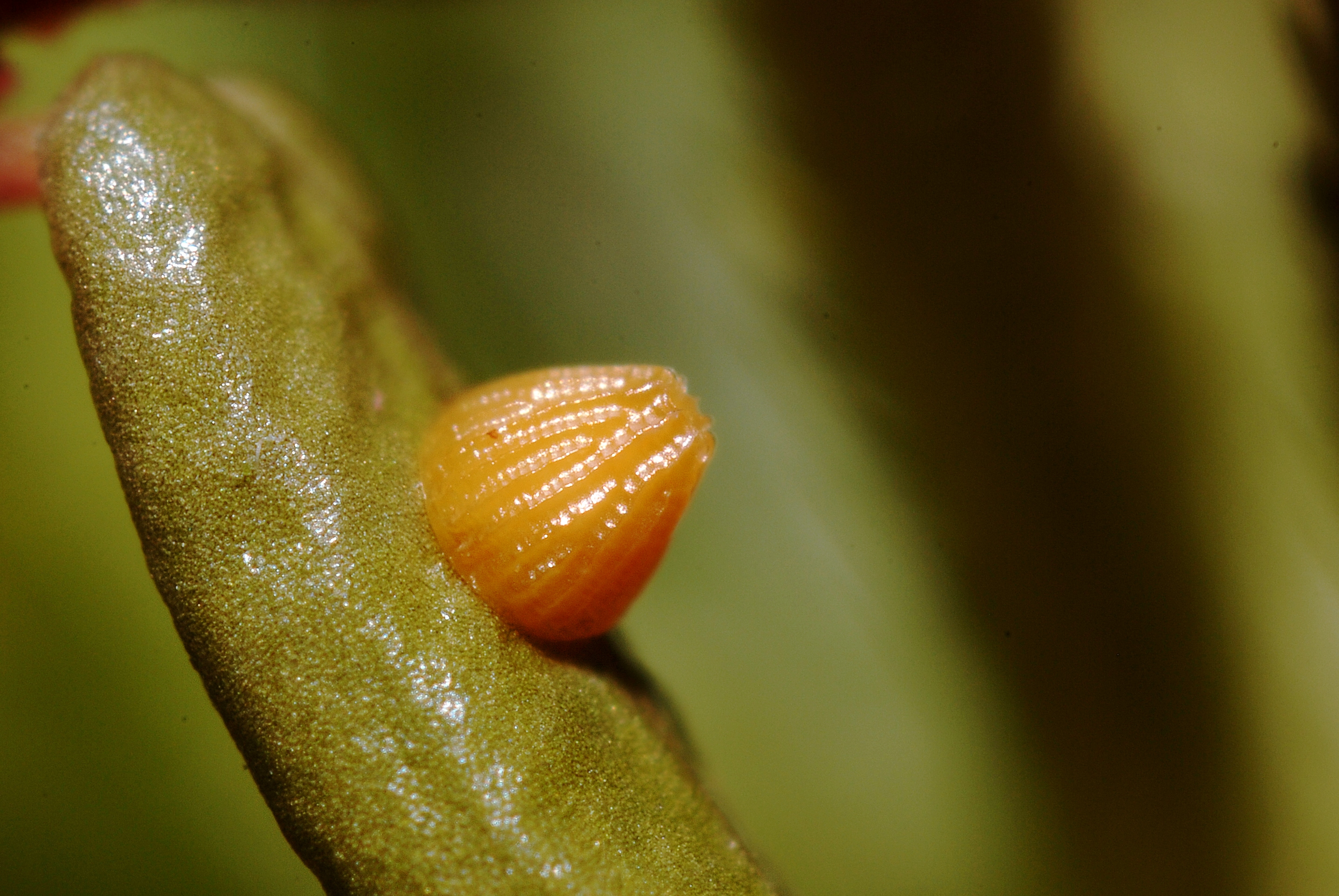
Egg

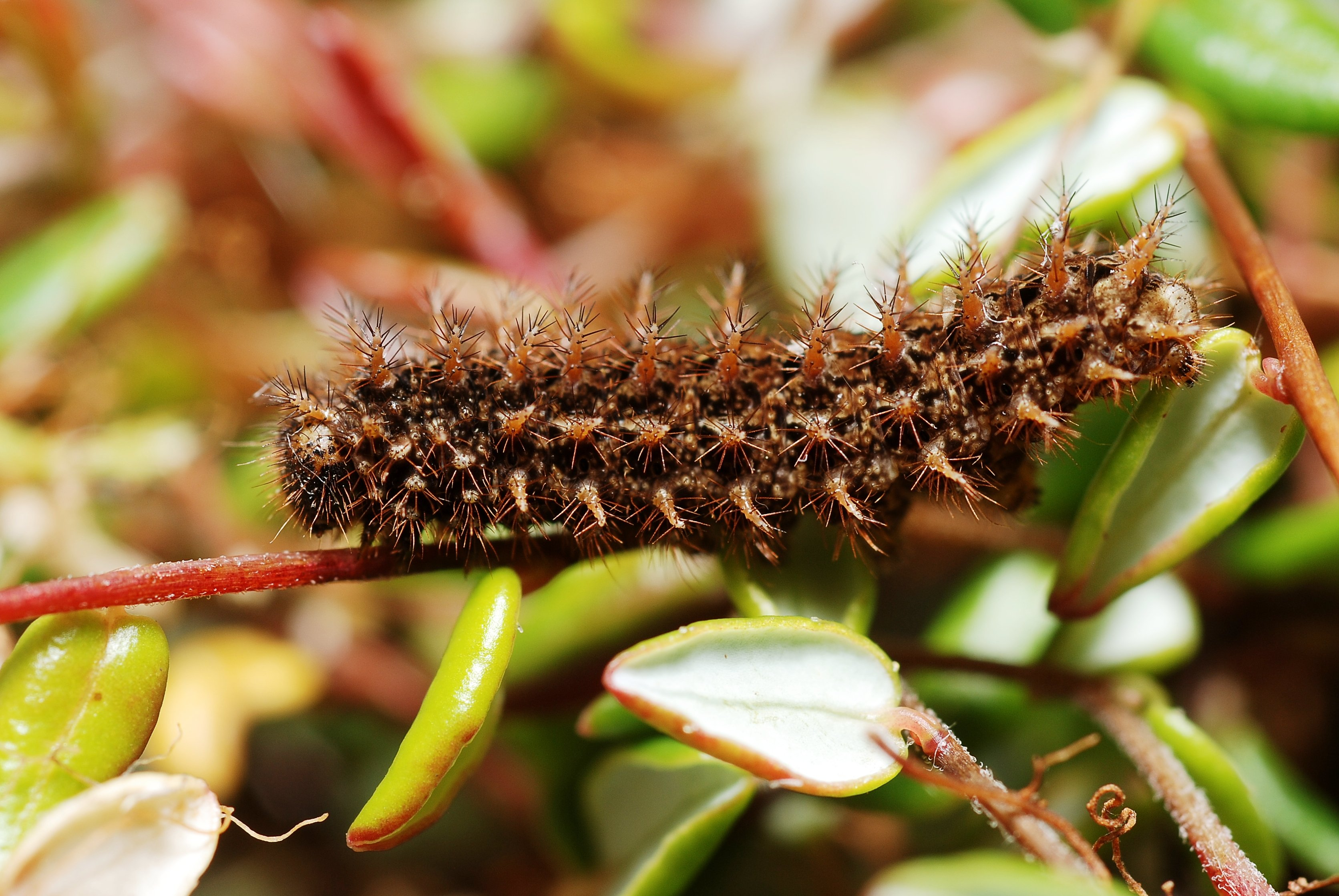
Larvae in July 2010, Ardennes, Belgium

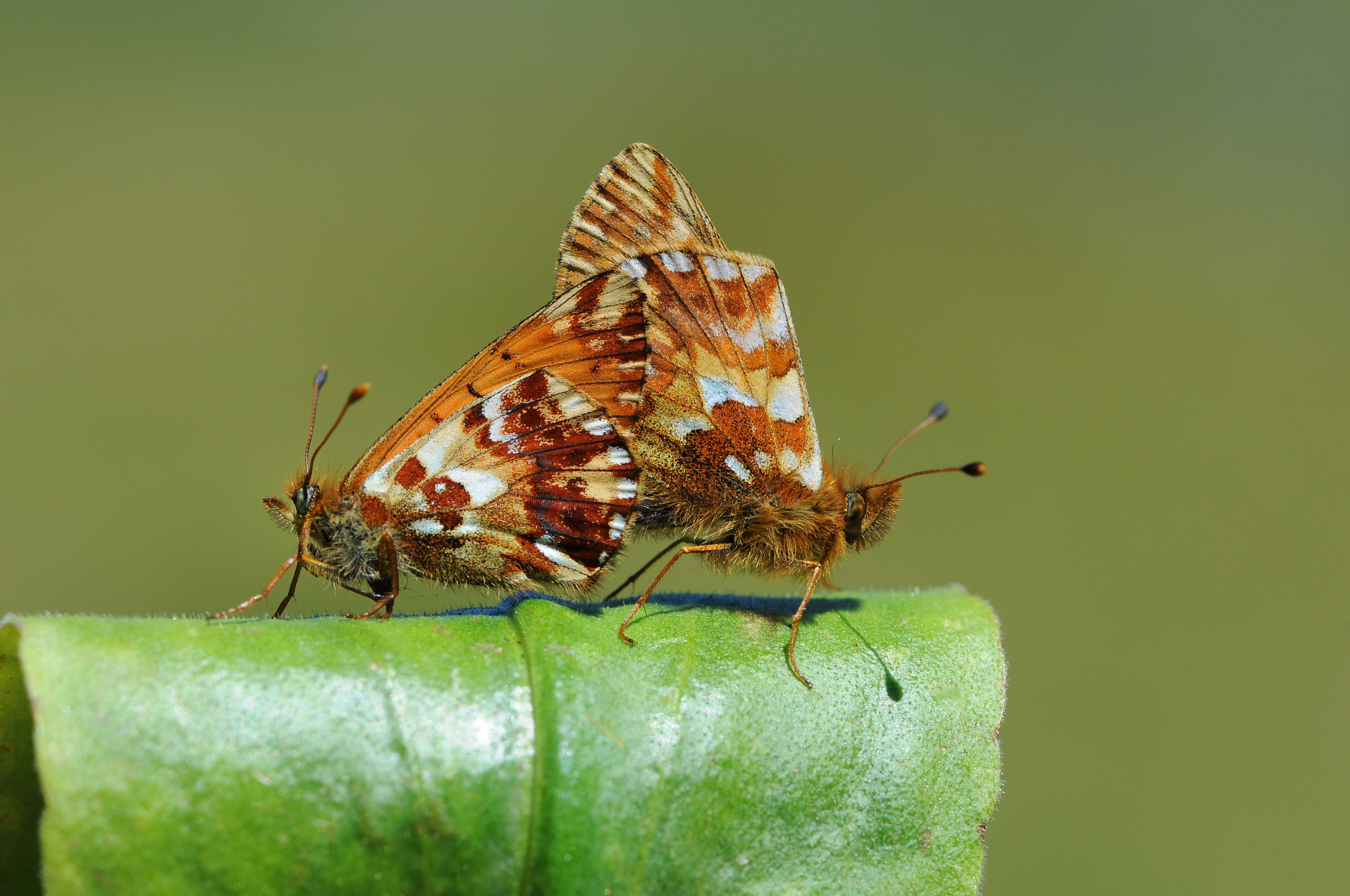
Mating
