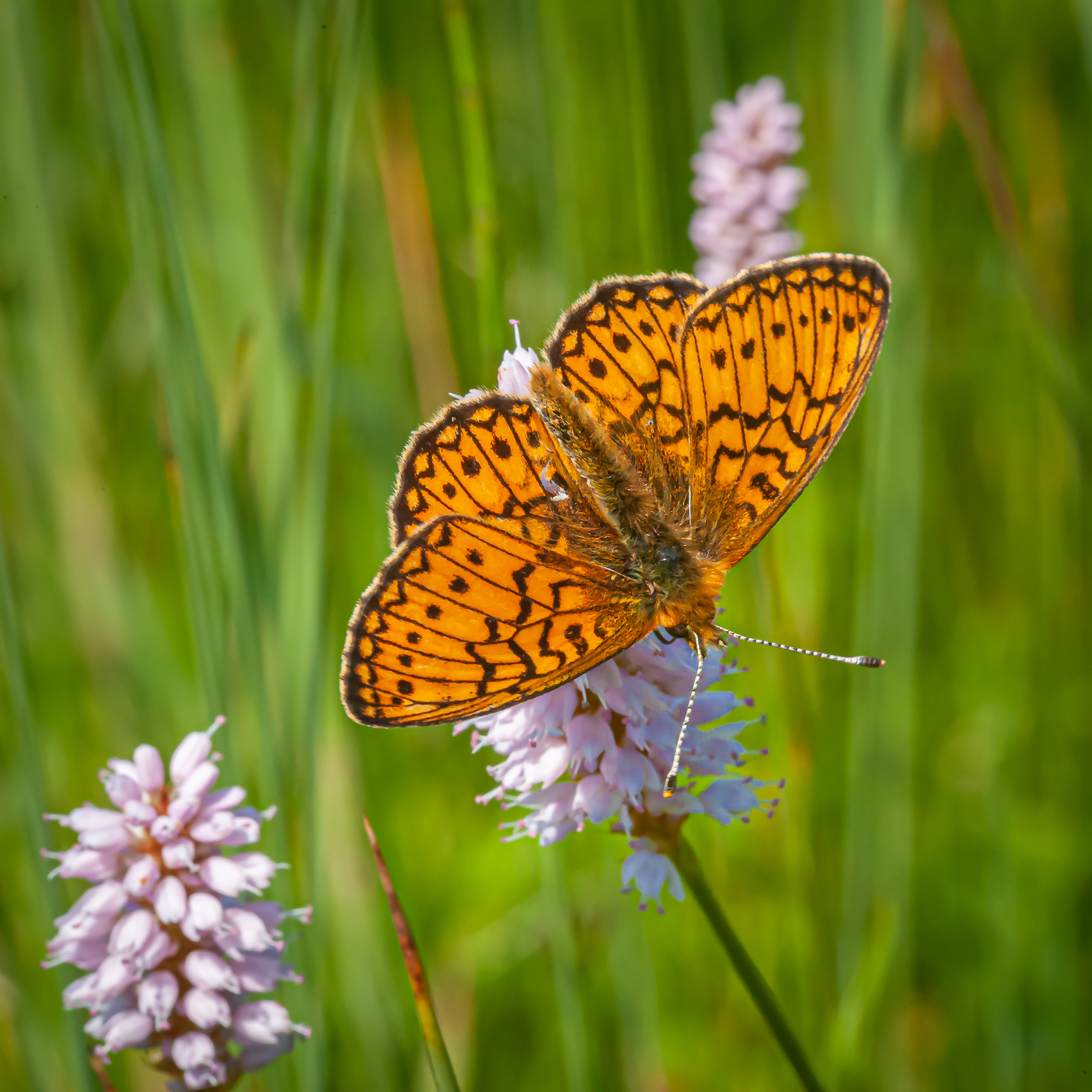

Conservation status
- Secure (NatureServe)

Scientific classification
- Kingdom: Animalia
- Phylum: Arthropoda
- Clade: Pancrustacea
- Class: Insecta
- Order: Lepidoptera
- Family: Nymphalidae
- Genus: Boloria
- Species: B. eunomia

Binomial name
- Boloria eunomia Esper, 1799

Synonyms
- Proclossiana eunomia; Boloria (Proclossiana) eunomia

= Boloria eunomia =

Species of butterfly

Boloria eunomia, the bog fritillary or ocellate bog fritillary, is a butterfly of the family Nymphalidae.

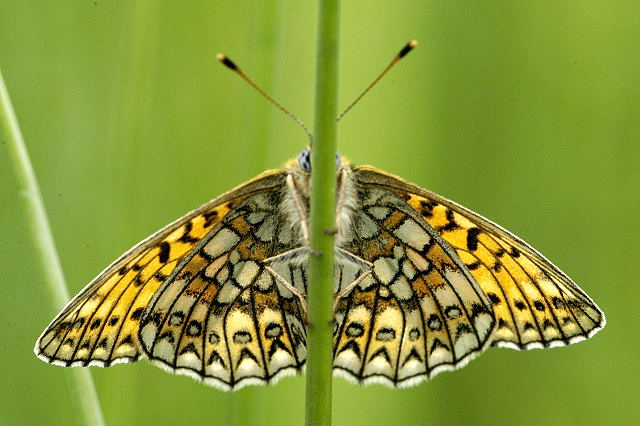

== Description ==
The length of the forewings is 20–24 mm. The wings are orange brown with dark markings. The color of the hindwings are orangish brown with a tan postmedian band followed by a row of round silver spots. Seitz- A. aphirape Hbn. (= eunomia Esp., tomyris Hbst.) (67f). Above pale reddish yellow, with a narrow black margin and small black submarginal lunules; the basal area separated from the central area by a black dentate line and bearing heavy markings. The median area with but one very regular row of dots in the middle, at the proximal side of which there are often feeble shadows in the female. Hindwing proximally dull ochreous, with yellowish macular bands near the base and in the middle. The distal area of the hindwing beneath light yellow, with a row of small white-centred ocelli and thin hastate markings before the margin.

The butterfly may be threatened by bog hydrology. The males search for females in wet areas. The butterfly has the subspecies triclaris (from Newfoundland to Alberta), nichollae (Alberta), and denali (Alaska and northern Yukon). The butterfly flies close to the ground. The species is listed as vulnerable. They eat nectar from flowers including Labrador tea and goldenrod. The species flies from the end of May till the beginning of August. The butterfly can be distinguished from similar species by looking on the hindwing underside; this species is the only one with a row of silvery submarginal spots.

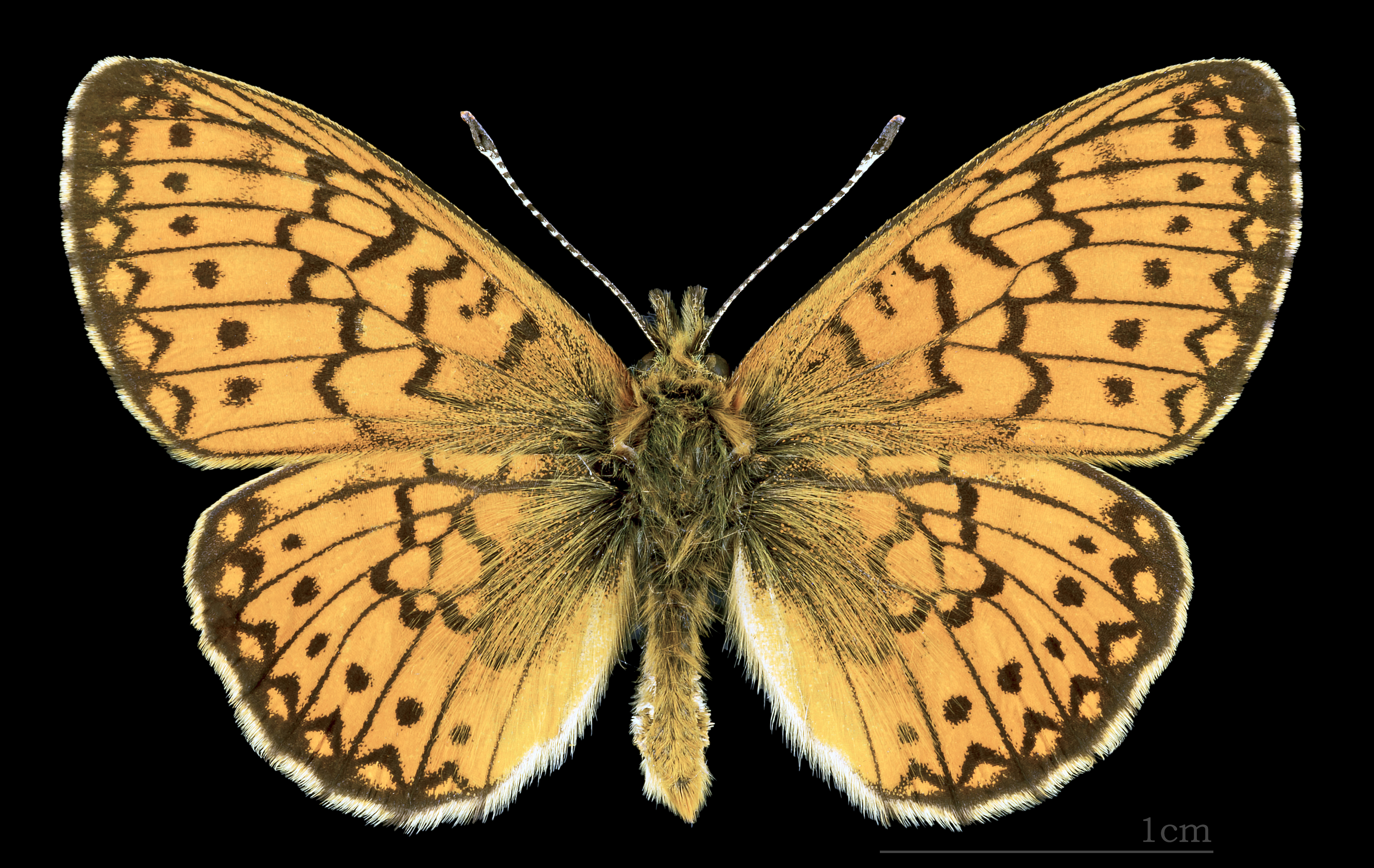
Dosal side

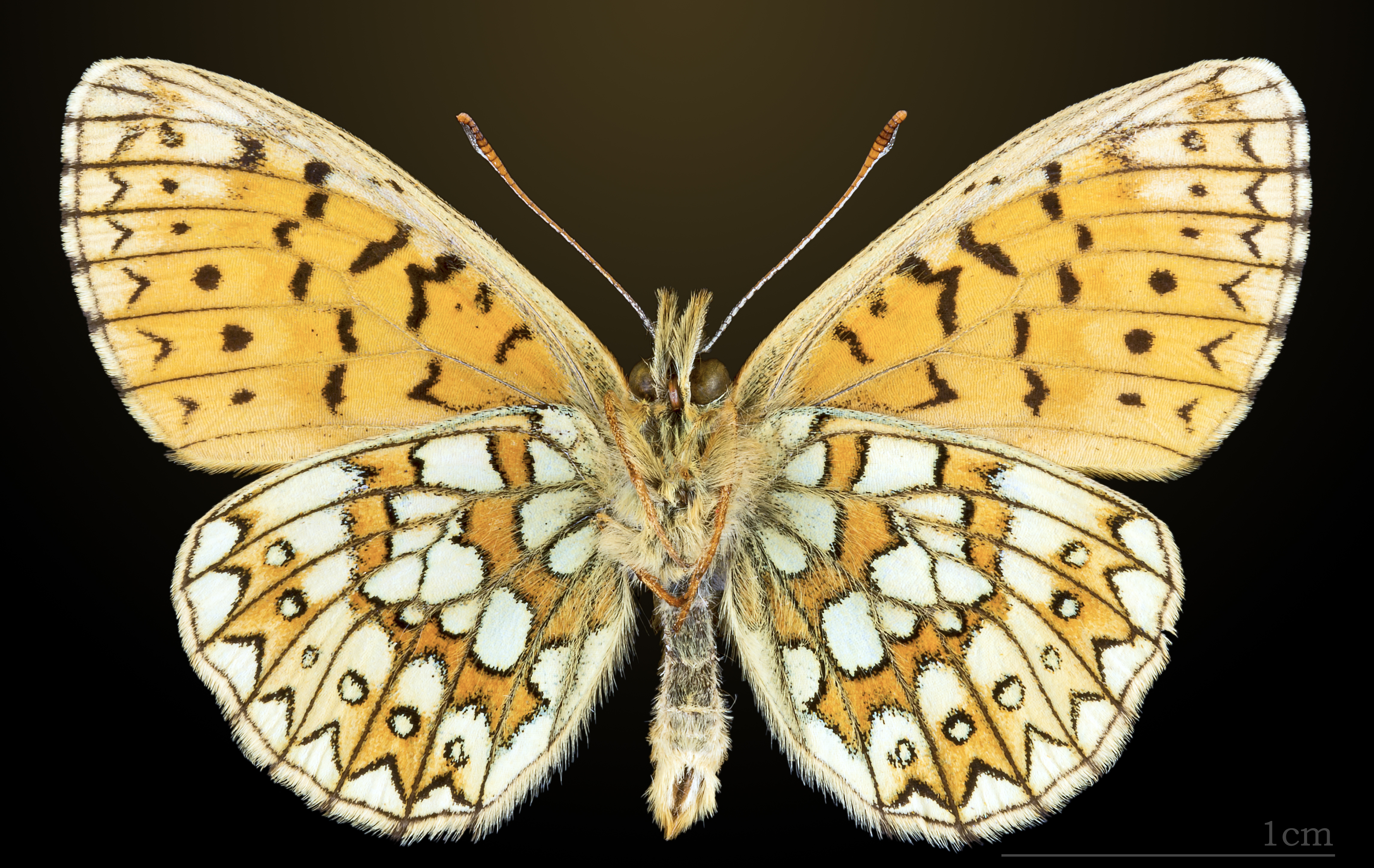
Ventral side

== Habitat ==
It is found throughout the north-temperate region of the Northern Hemisphere including the Balkan Mountains of Bulgaria and one isolated population in Serbia. The species is not mentioned in the Red Data Book of Serbian butterflies because it was not known to be in the country at the time of it being published. The species is commonly found in open acid bogs in areas that are moist. It can also be found in moist tundra and willow seeps.

== Caterpillars ==
The eggs are laid in groups of 2 to 4 under the host plant leaves. The eggs hatch in 7 to 8 days and after hatching, they feed on the underside of the leaves on the host plant. Caterpillars in Colorado and Wyoming are reddish brown with red spines, with third or fourth instars hibernating. The caterpillars feed on Viola species and willows. The caterpillars can be found from April to June. The caterpillars are silver gray with white dots.

== Behavior ==
=== Mating system and migration ===
Proclossiana eunomia exhibits a polygynous mating system which is quite common in butterflies with short breeding periods. With breeding periods of 5 and 7 days, respectively for males and females, there is little time to maximize matings. The butterfly Proclossiana eunomia wants to pass on as many genes as it can in its short lifespan and thus males do not discriminate, trying to court all females they encounter. On the other hand, females are a bit more selective and have been observed to refuse incoming males either by displaying a mate-refusal posture or by simply fleeing away.

This pattern of mating affects the migratory behavior of Proclossiana eunomia. This physical moving of individual of a species is dependent on the density of the population. At high male densities females are harassed by willing males, resulting in female-biased emigration where females leave the imminent area. At low male densities, females are not bothered and are safe to stay in their local environment. In addition, at low female densities males might begin to emigrate out of the area in search for new unmated females whereas at high female density males already enjoy a wide selection of females without a need to migrate. The polygynous mating system of the bog fritillary whereby males freely pursue females induces a change in migratory behavior.
