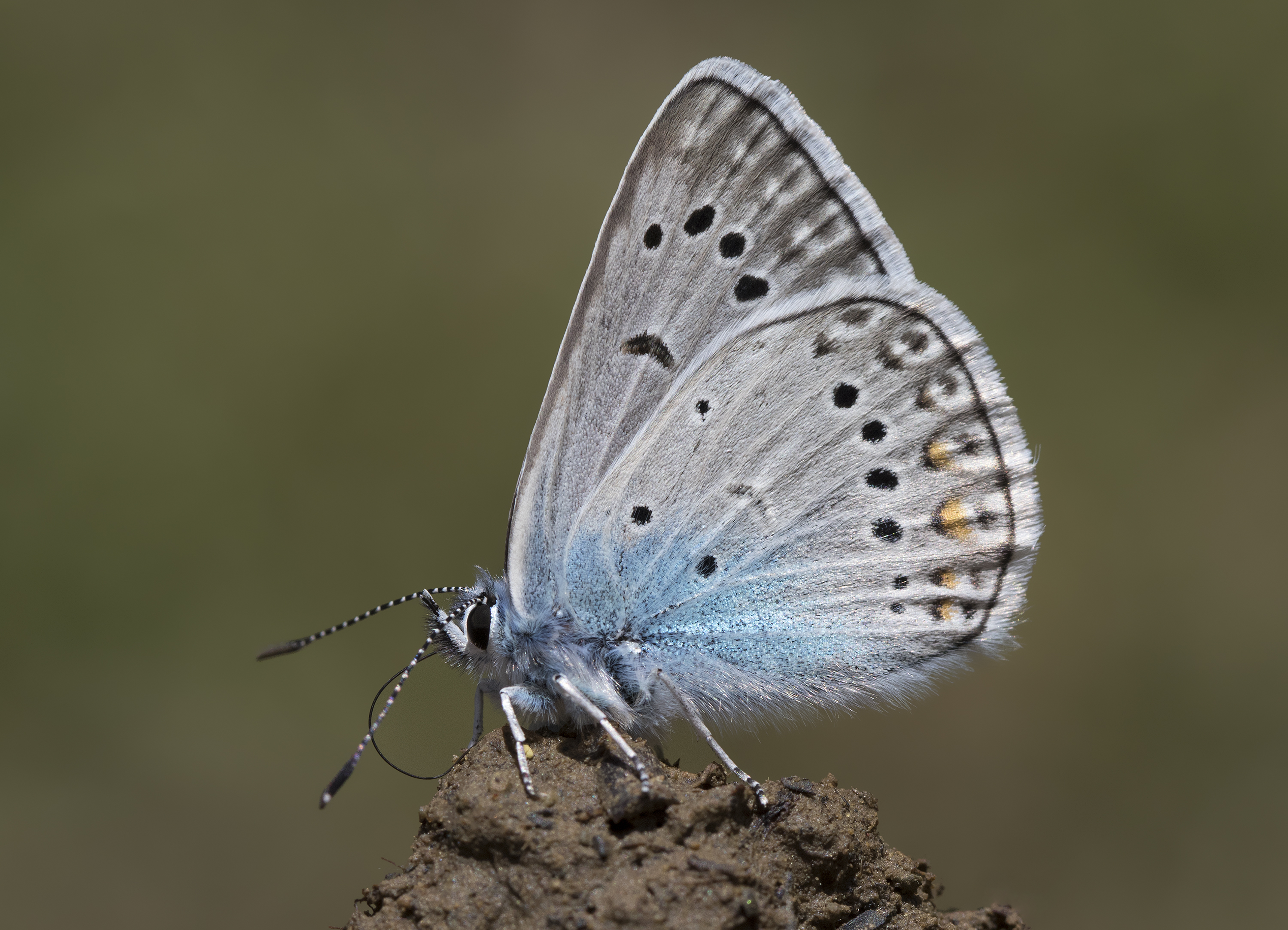
- Male

Scientific classification
- Kingdom: Animalia
- Phylum: Arthropoda
- Clade: Pancrustacea
- Class: Insecta
- Order: Lepidoptera
- Family: Lycaenidae
- Genus: Polyommatus
- Species: P. amandus

Binomial name
- Polyommatus amandus (Schneider, 1792)

Synonyms
- Papilio amandus Schneider, 1792; Papilio icarius Esper, 1789; Polyommatus icarius (Esper, 1789); Agrodiaetus amandus (Schneider, 1792); Lysandra amanda (Schneider, 1792); Plebicula amanda (Schneider, 1792); Plebeius amandus (Schneider, 1792)

= Polyommatus amandus =

Species of butterfly

Polyommatus amandus, the Amanda's blue, is a butterfly of the family Lycaenidae. It is found in the Palearctic realm.

== Description ==
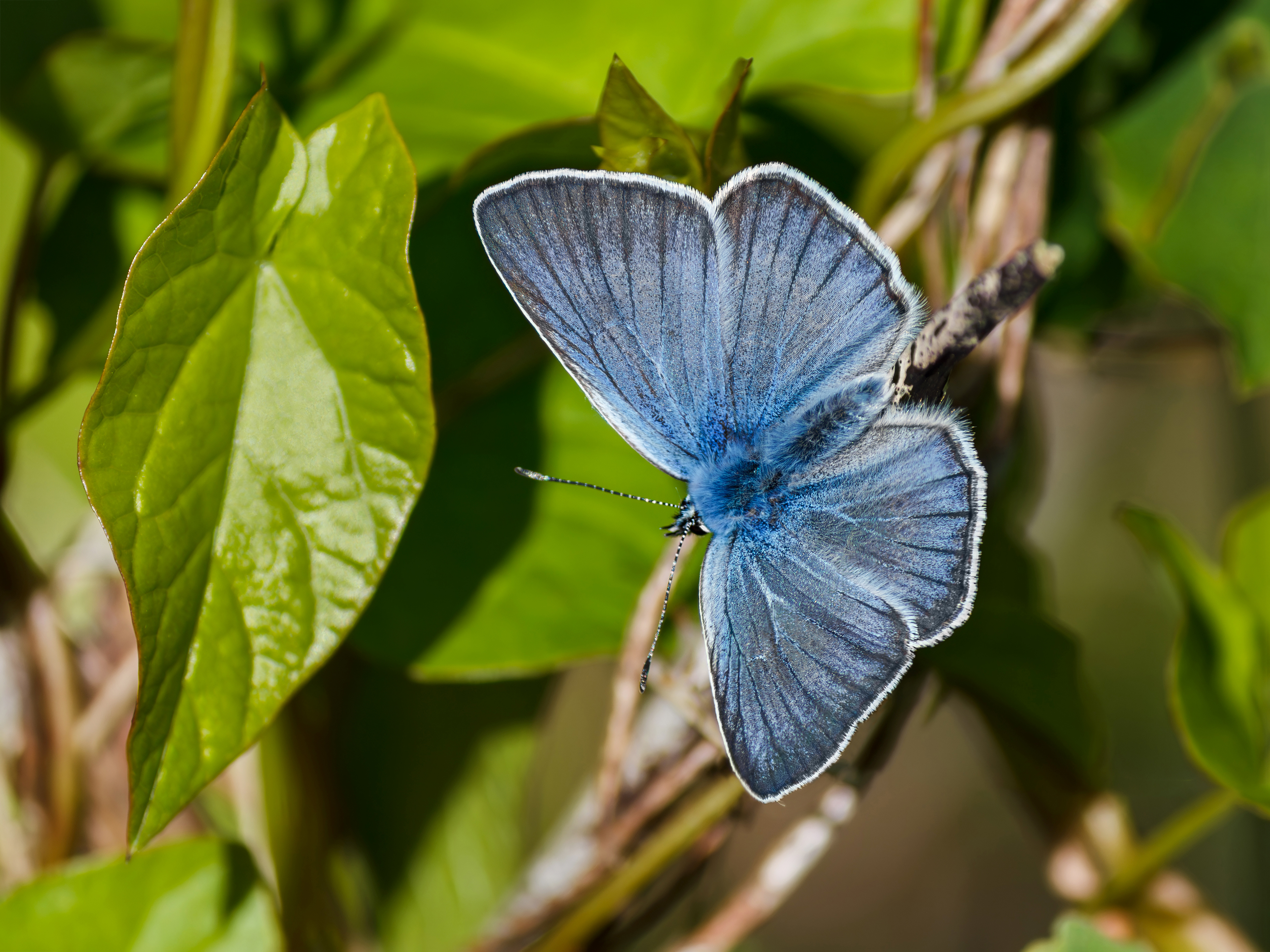
Male

With a wingspan of 29 to 35 mm (1.1 to 1.4 in), Amanda's blue is noticeably larger than most of the "blue" butterflies, which is particularly apparent when they are flying. The upperside of the male's wings is a silvery blue or sky blue, often, but not always, with a broad dark border and a narrow black marginal line with an outermost white line. The upperside of the female's wings is in some populations dark blue edged with brown but in other populations is medium brown with a row of orange half-moon shaped lunules near the edges. The hind margin has red blotches. The underside of the male's wings are light grey with white-edged black blotches. The underside of the female's wings is similar but they are a rich creamy-brown colour with red blotches, especially on the margins of the hindwings and a series of black spots with white rims, often touching, forming a row parallel to the margin of the wings. The basal areas of the underwings are turquoise. The wingspan is 28 to 36 mm (1.1 to 1.4 in).

== Description from Seitz ==
L. amandus Schr. (= icarius Esp., corydon Thunb., amanda auct.) (80h). Resembling damon in shape and size and in certain local varieties also in the upperside of the male. In true amandus, however, the male is above much deeper blue with a slight violet sheen, so that the males look like gigantic icarus, from which they are however distinguished at a glance by the costal margin being broadly shaded with black. Also the underside recalls a large icarus, but the basal ocelli are always absent from the forewing. In South and East Europe, wanting in England and the whole North-West, as well as the greater part of Germany and France. Occurs from Spain to Central Asia and from Scandinavia and Denmark east- and southward to Greece and Asia Minor. In ab. caeca Gillm. the discal row of ocelli is absent on the under-side. In ab. confluens Schrk. some of the spots of the underside are confluent. ab. stigmatica Schultz has black marginal dots on the upperside of the hindwing. In ab. argentea Lampa, recorded from Sweden, the male has the ground-colour of the upperside modified into silvery grey. — In the form lydia Krul. [P. amanda ssp. lydia Krulikowsky, 1892 ](80h), from South Russia, the blackish grey shading at the costal margin of the forewing above is absent, the wings having only a narrow black edge; the red submarginal spots of the underside are larger. — orientalis.Stgr. [P. amanda ssp. orientalis Staudinger, 1901] (80h) has likewise a narrower black border to the forewing above in the male, but the red spots of the underside are rather smaller, certainly not larger than in name-typical amandus: from Anterior Asia. — In amatus Gr.-Grsh.[P. a. amata (Grum-Grshimailo, 1890)] (80h) the upperside of the male is much more glossy and more blue-green instead of violet-blue; the underside is purer dust-grey. The female resembles the female of L. escheri. From the Pamir. — turensis Ruhl [P. a. turensis (Ruhl and Heyne, [1895])is larger, the blue of the male is as in the name-typical form, the underside strongly spotted; the red submarginal spots in the female present also on the forewing, which happens sometimes also in amatus: from Turkestan. — amurensis Stgr. [P.amandus amurensis (Staudinger, 1892)](80h) is brighter and lighter blue above, the underside bears larger and more distinct dark spots. From Lake Baikal through Amurland to Askold. — Egg flattened, white, minutely reticulated; the meshes of the network polygonal, the corners projecting like the spines of a sea urchin (Gillmer). Larva densely clothed with minute hair, the segments dorsally strongly swollen, dark green, with black head and pale-edged red-brown dorsal line, which is accompanied by small brown spots, lateral stripe whitish. Until June on Vicia cracca. The butterflies are on the wing from July onward, in the extreme south (Greece) already at the end of May, and fly in the same places and in the same way as icarus. In the East they are plentiful almost everywhere, but in the West they are only found singly and sporadically, being absent from large districts.

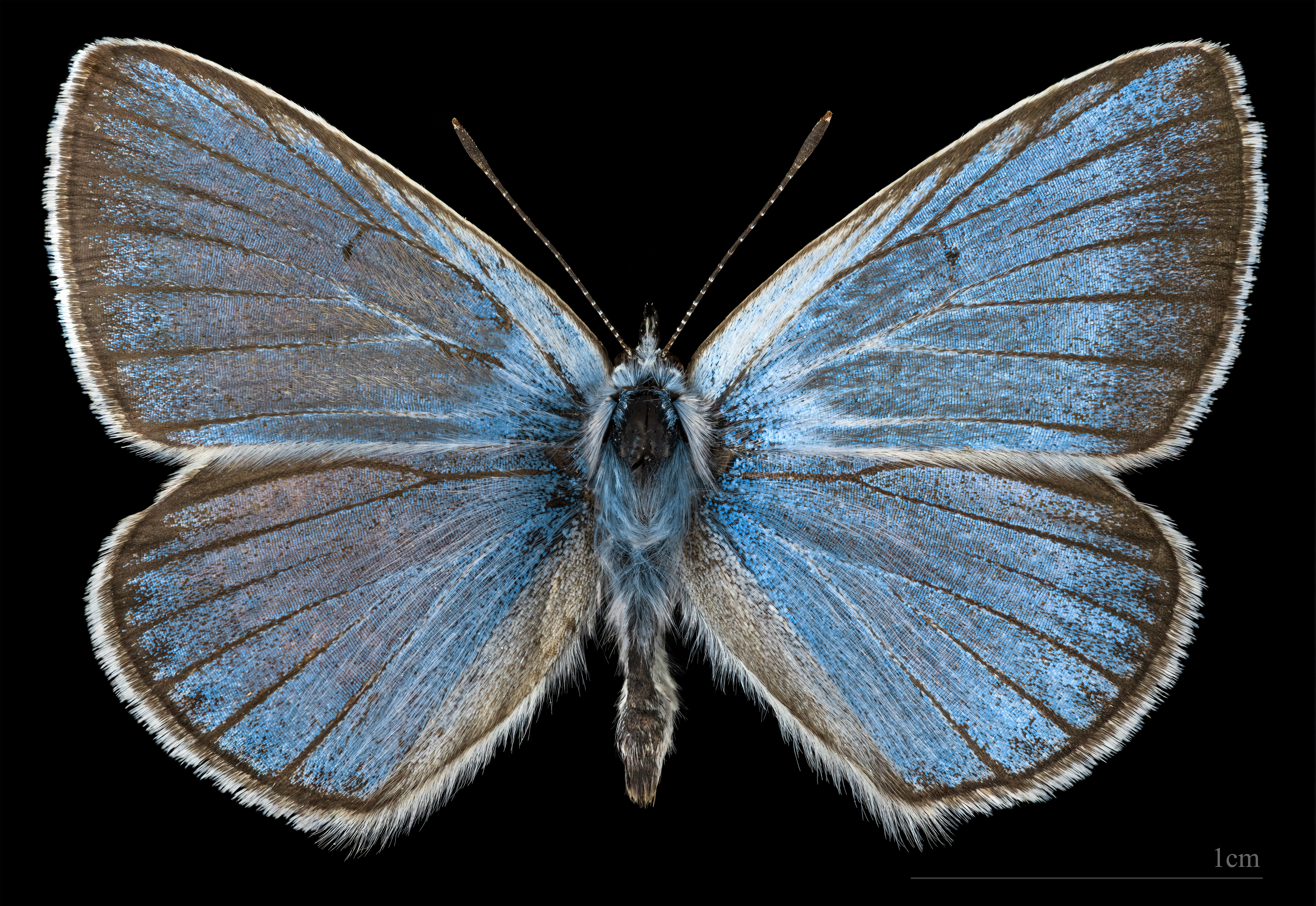
Polyommatus amandus ♂

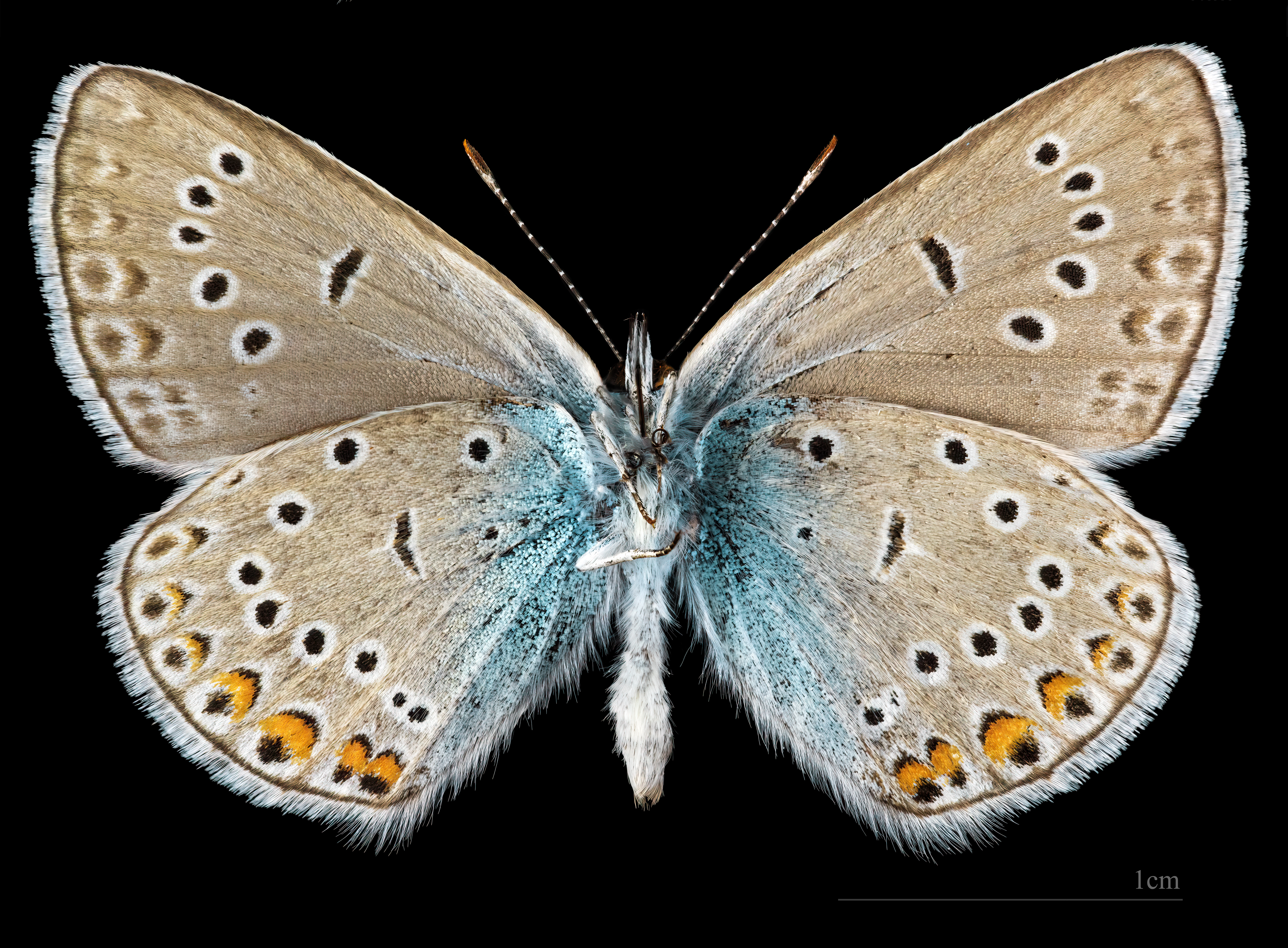
Polyommatus amandus ♂ △

== Distribution and habitat ==
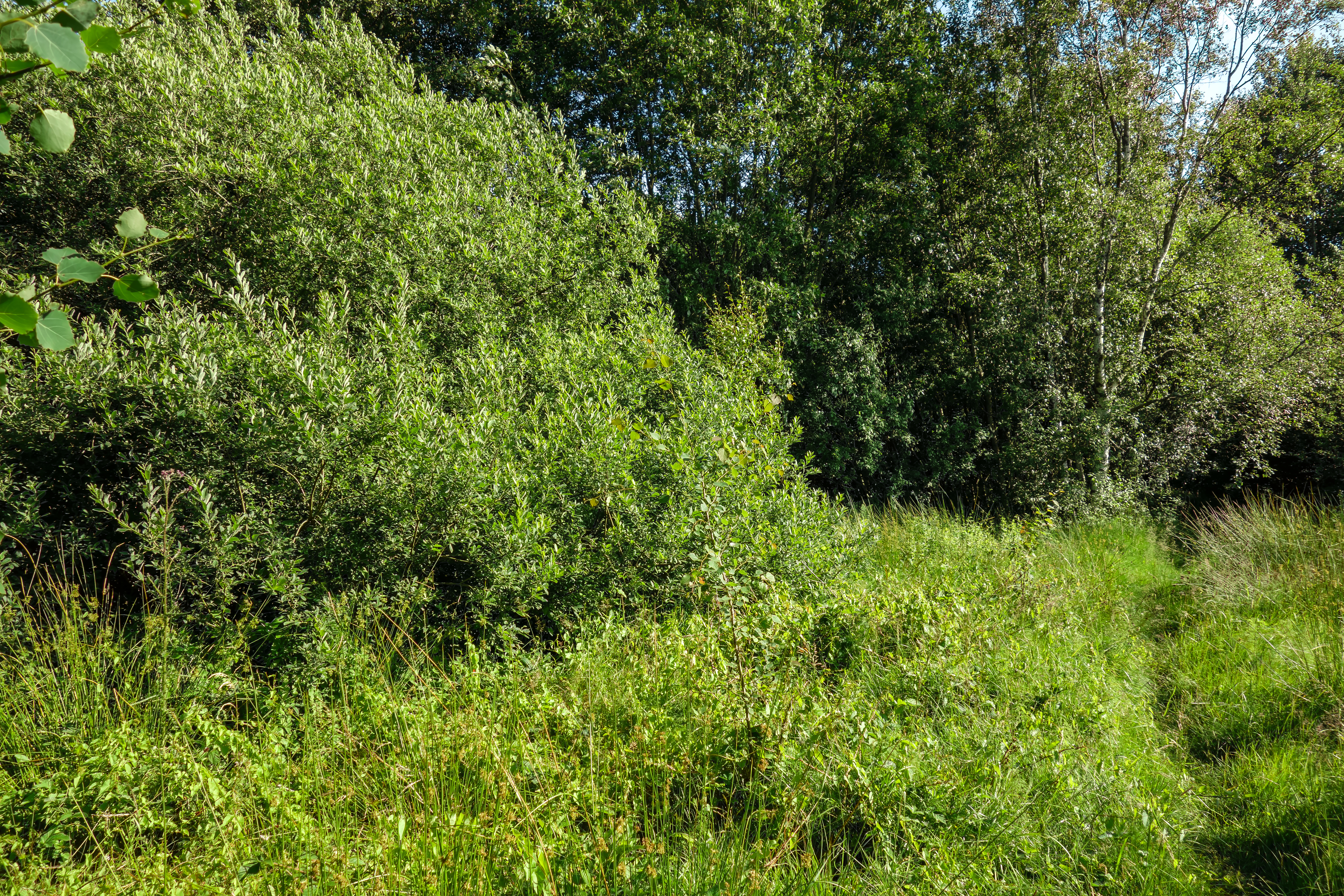
Amanda's blue habitat in Myrstigen rewilding area in Brastad, Sweden

Amanda's blue is native to much of central and northern Europe and across the Palearctic to the Russian Far East. Its habitat is meadows, heaths, grassland, roadsides and other open areas and places where the larval food plants grow and usually at altitudes of at least 1,000 metres (3,300 ft).

== Life cycle ==
This butterfly flies from May to August. The larvae feed on species of vetch, often meadow vetchling (Lathyrus pratensis) and tufted vetch (Vicia cracca). The males fly around near the host plants waiting for females to arrive. The females lay their eggs singly on the leaves of the host plant. The caterpillars have glands which secrete a sugary fluid that attracts ants and the presence of these protects the larvae from predators.
