= List of butterflies of Canada =

This is a list of butterflies of Canada.

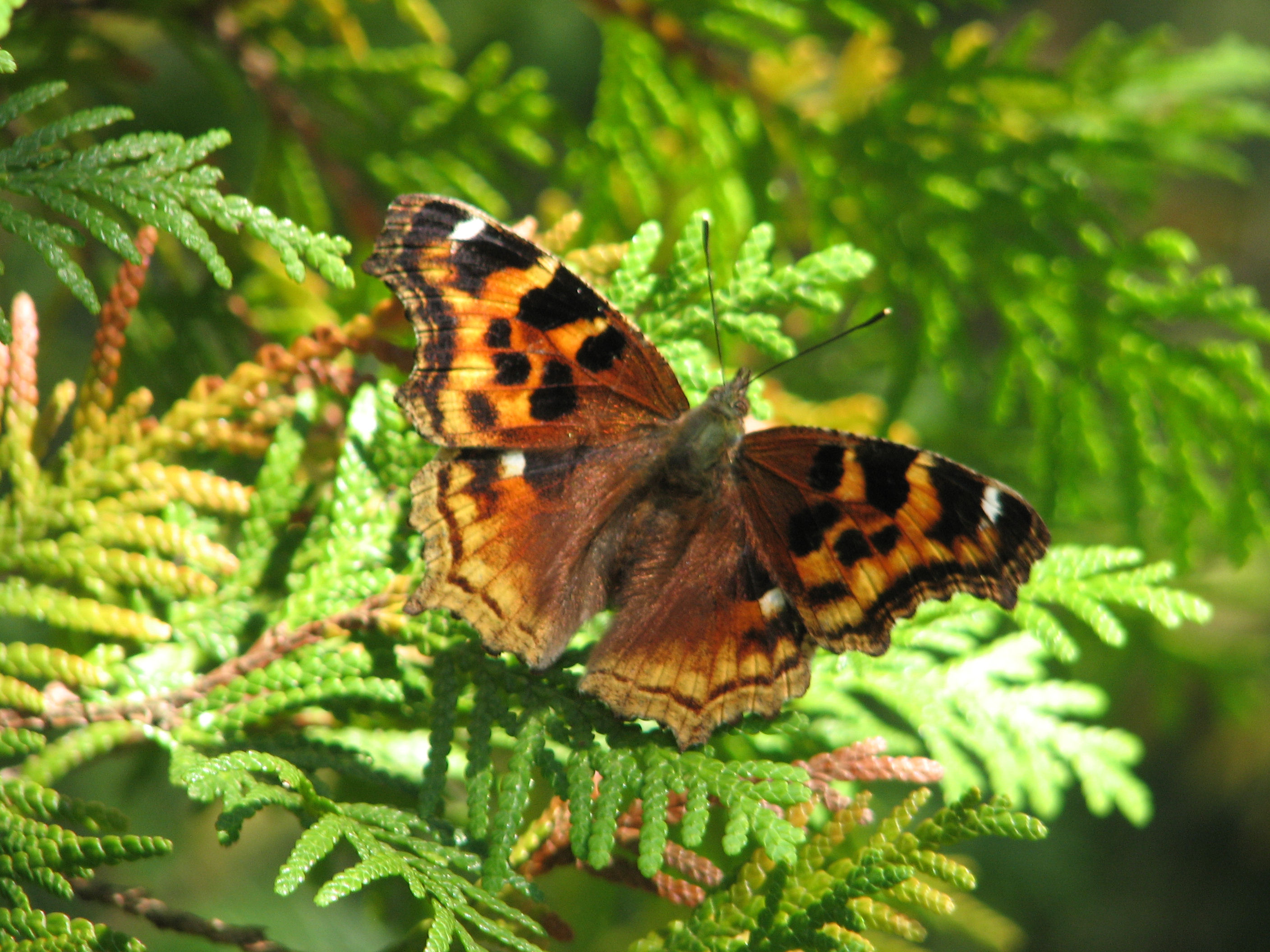
Compton tortoiseshell (Nymphalis vaualbum)

== Family Hesperiidae – skippers ==
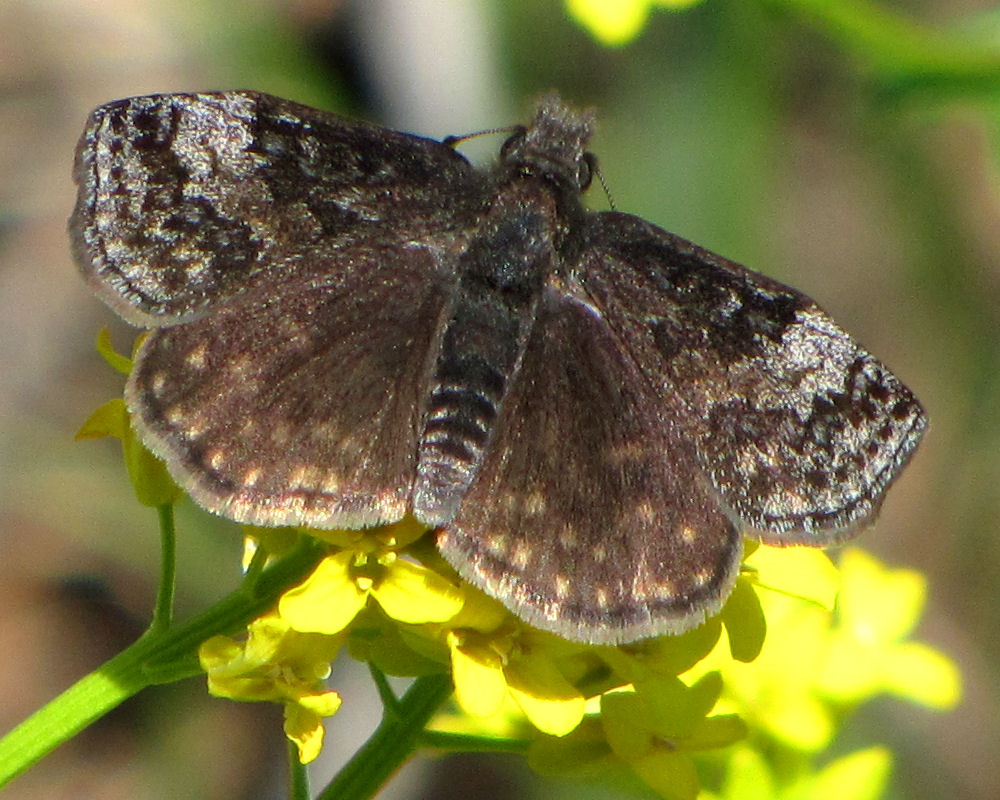
Dreamy duskywing (Erynnis icelus)

=== Subfamily Pyrginae – pyrgine skippers ===
- Epargyreus clarus – silver-spotted skipper
- Urbanus proteus – long-tailed skipper
- Achalarus lyciades – hoary edge
- Thorybes bathyllus – southern cloudywing
- Thorybes pylades – northern cloudywing
- Staphylus hayhurstii – Hayhurst's scallopwing
- Erynnis icelus – dreamy duskywing
- Erynnis brizo – sleepy duskywing
- Erynnis juvenalis – Juvenal's duskywing
- Erynnis propertius – propertius duskywing
- Erynnis horatius – Horace's duskywing
- Erynnis martialis – mottled duskywing
- Erynnis pacuvius – Pacuvius duskywing
- Erynnis zarucco – Zarucco duskywing
- Erynnis funeralis – funereal duskywing
- Erynnis lucilius – columbine duskywing
- Erynnis baptisiae – wild indigo duskywing
- Erynnis afranius – Afranius duskywing
- Erynnis persius – Persius duskywing
- Pyrgus centaureae – grizzled skipper
- Pyrgus ruralis – two-banded checkered skipper
- Pyrgus scriptura – small checkered skipper
- Pyrgus communis – common checkered skipper
- Pholisora catullus – common sootywing

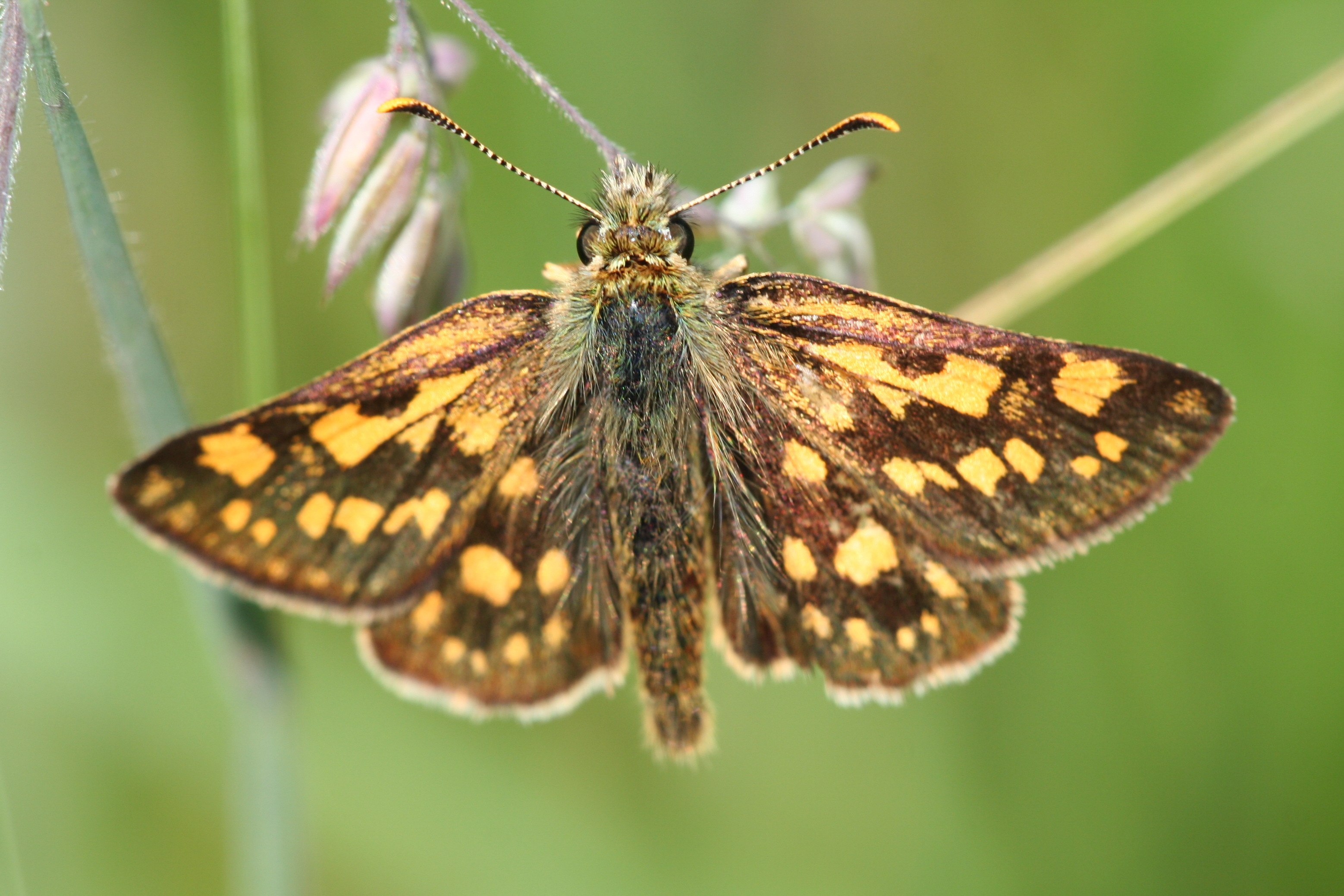
Arctic skipper (Carterocephalus palaemon)

=== Subfamily Heteropterinae – intermediate skippers ===
- Carterocephalus palaemon – Arctic skipper

=== Subfamily Hesperiinae – branded skippers ===
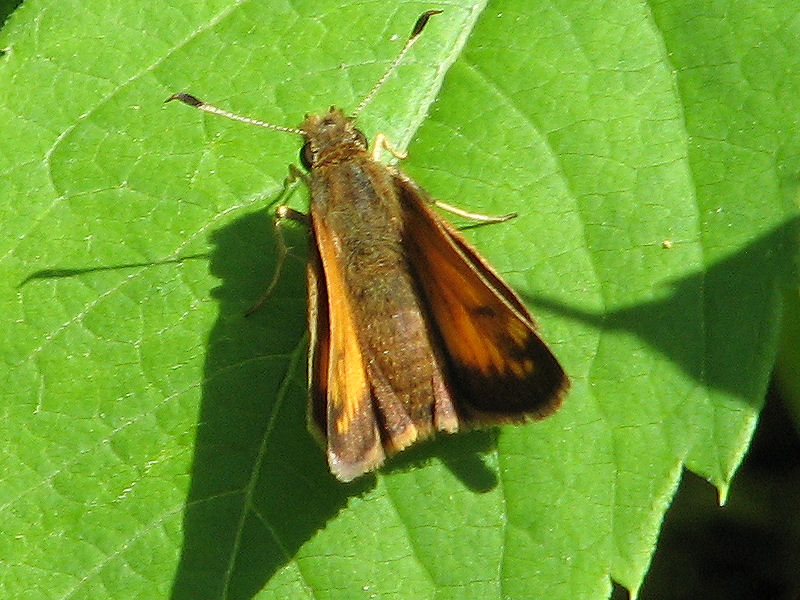
Hobomok skipper (Poanes hobomok)

- Lerema accius – clouded skipper
- Ancyloxypha numitor – least skipper
- Oarisma poweshiek – Poweshiek skipperling
- Oarisma garita – Garita skipperling
- Thymelicus lineola – European skipper
- Hylephila phyleus – fiery skipper
- Hesperia uncas – uncas skipper
- Hesperia juba – juba skipper
- Hesperia comma – common branded skipper
- Hesperia colorado – western branded skipper
- Hesperia assiniboia – plains skipper
- Hesperia ottoe – Ottoe skipper
- Hesperia leonardus – Leonard's skipper
- Hesperia pahaska – Pahaska skipper
- Hesperia dacotae – Dakota skipper
- Hesperia sassacus – Indian skipper
- Hesperia nevada – Nevada skipper
- Polites peckius – Peck's skipper
- Polites sabuleti – sandhill skipper
- Polites draco – draco skipper
- Polites themistocles – tawny-edged skipper
- Polites origenes – crossline skipper
- Polites mystic – long dash skipper
- Polites rhesus – rhesus skipper
- Polites sonora – sonoran skipper
- Polites vibex – whirlabout
- Wallengrenia egeremet – northern broken-dash
- Pompeius verna – little glassywing
- Atalopedes campestris – sachem
- Anatrytone logan – Delaware skipper
- Ochlodes sylvanoides – woodland skipper
- Poanes massasoit – mulberry wing
- Poanes hobomok – Hobomok skipper
- Poanes zabulon – Zabulon skipper
- Poanes viator – broad-winged skipper
- Euphyes dion – Dion skipper
- Euphyes dukesi – Dukes' skipper
- Euphyes conspicua – black dash
- Euphyes bimacula – two-spotted skipper
- Euphyes vestris – dun skipper
- Atrytonopsis hianna – dusted skipper
- Amblyscirtes simius – simius roadside skipper
- Amblyscirtes oslari – Oslar's roadside skipper
- Amblyscirtes hegon – pepper and salt skipper
- Amblyscirtes vialis – common roadside skipper
- Calpodes ethlius – Brazilian skipper
- Panoquina ocola – ocola skipper

== Family Papilionidae – parnassians and swallowtails ==
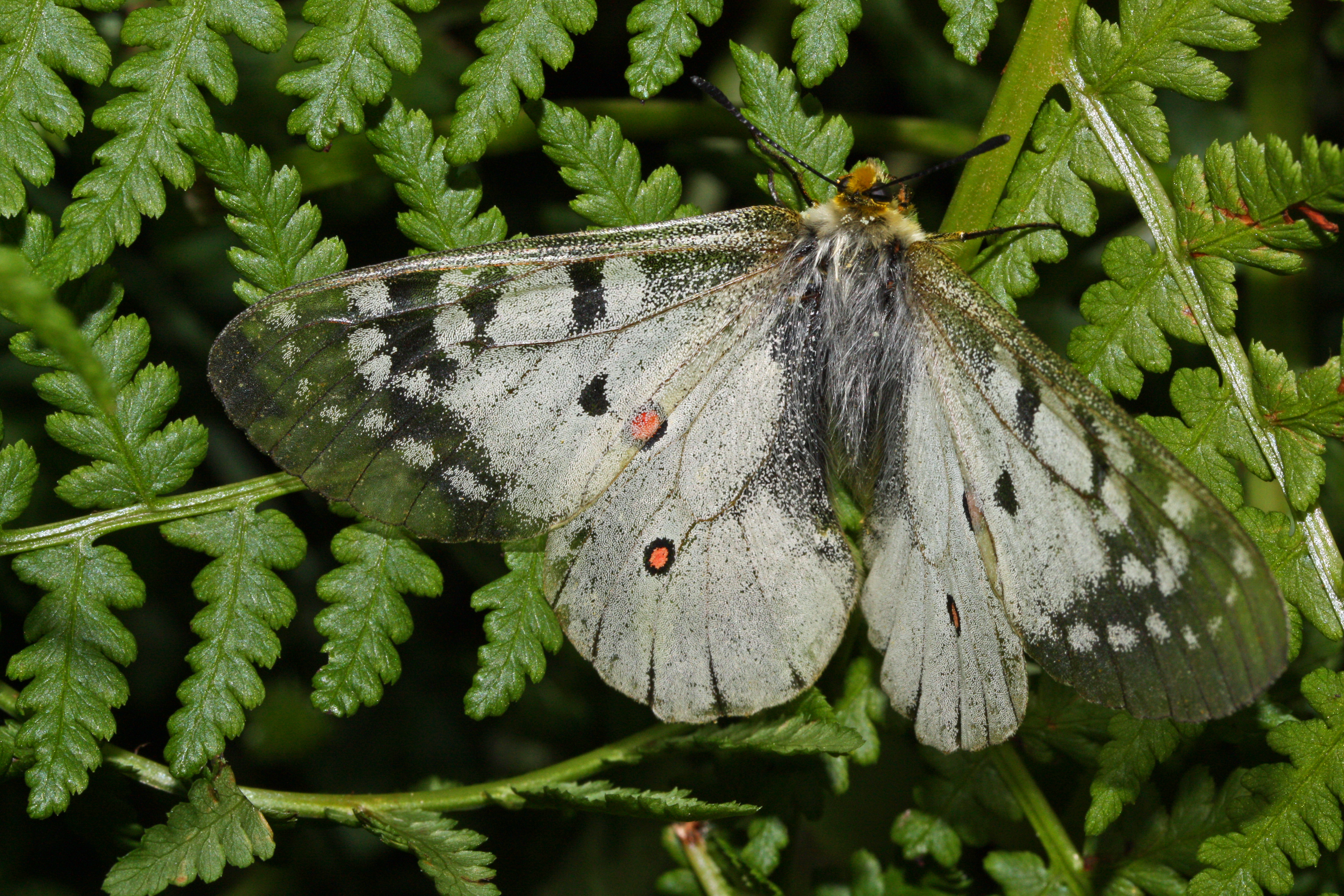
Rocky Mountain parnassian (Parnassius smintheus)

=== Subfamily Parnassiinae – parnassians ===
- Parnassius eversmanni – Eversmann's parnassian
- Parnassius clodius – Clodius parnassian
- Parnassius phoebus – Phoebus parnassian
- Parnassius smintheus – Rocky Mountain parnassian

=== Subfamily Papilioninae – swallowtails ===
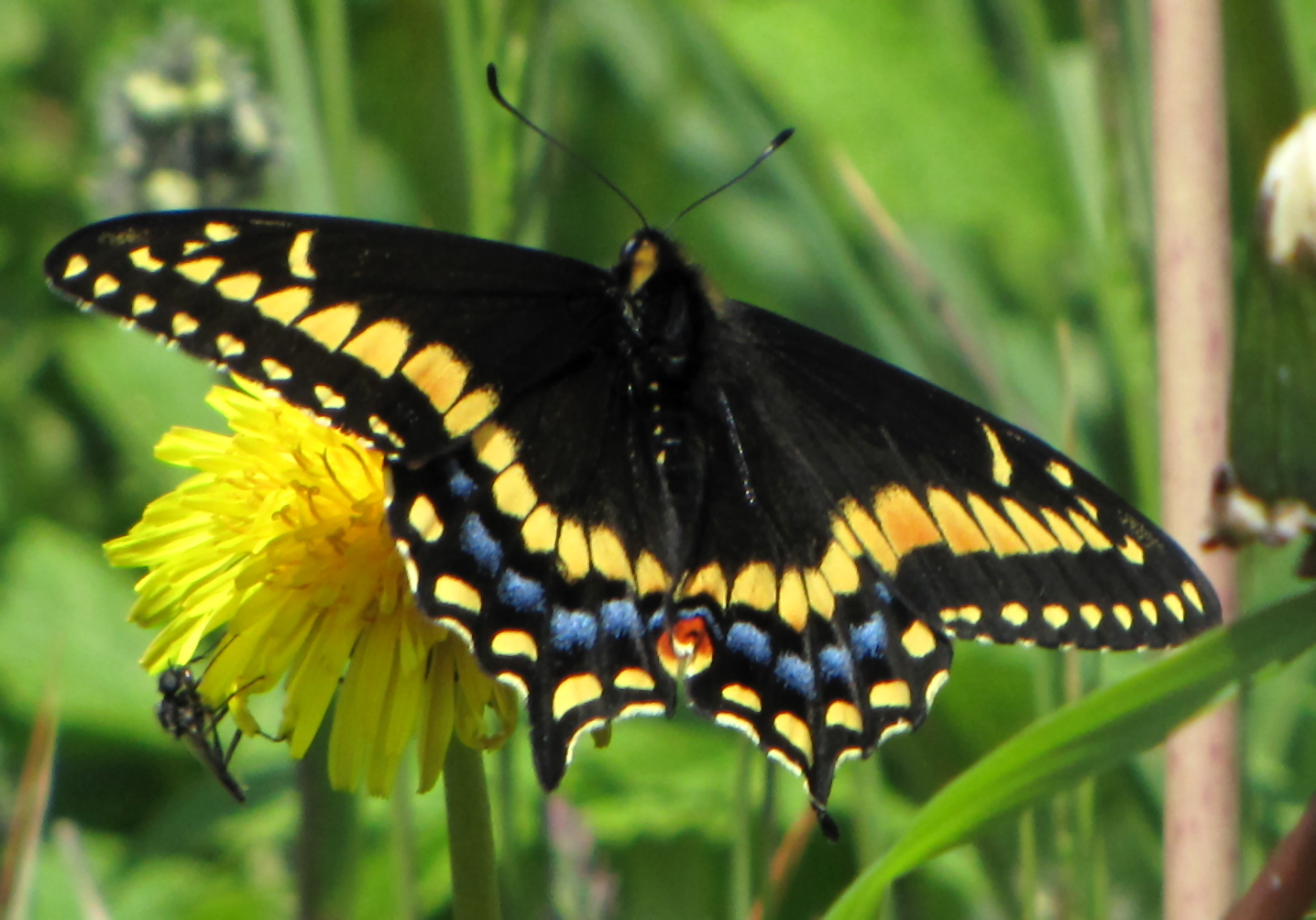
Short-tailed swallowtail (Papilio brevicauda)

- Battus philenor – pipevine swallowtail
- Eurytides marcellus – zebra swallowtail
- Papilio polyxenes – black swallowtail
- Papilio brevicauda – short-tailed swallowtail
- Papilio machaon – Old World swallowtail
- Papilio zelicaon – anise swallowtail
- Papilio indra – Indra swallowtail
- Papilio cresphontes – giant swallowtail
- Papilio glaucus – eastern tiger swallowtail
- Papilio canadensis – Canadian tiger swallowtail
- Papilio rutulus – western tiger swallowtail
- Papilio multicaudatus – two-tailed swallowtail
- Papilio eurymedon – pale swallowtail
- Papilio troilus – spicebush swallowtail

== Family Pieridae – whites and sulphurs ==
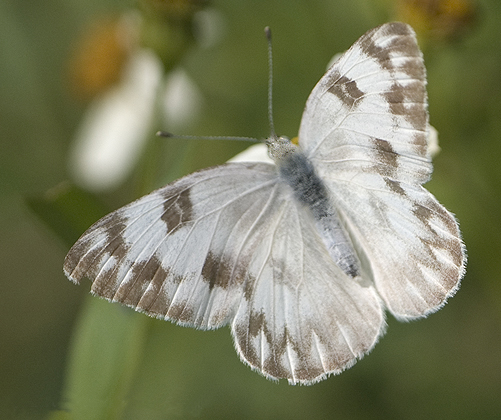
Checkered white (Pontia protodice)

=== Subfamily Pierinae – whites, marbles, and orangetips ===
- Neophasia menapia – pine white
- Pontia beckerii – Becker's white
- Pontia sisymbrii – spring white
- Pontia protodice – checkered white
- Pontia occidentalis – western white
- Pieris angelika – Arctic white
- Pieris marginalis – margined white
- Pieris oleracea – mustard white
- Pieris virginiensis – West Virginia white
- Pieris rapae – cabbage white
- Ascia monuste – great southern white
- Euchloe ausonides – large marble
- Euchloe naina – green marble
- Euchloe creusa – northern marble
- Euchloe lotta – desert marble
- Euchloe olympia – Olympia marble
- Anthocharis sara – Pacific orangetip
- Anthocharis stella – Stella orangetip

=== Subfamily Coliadinae – sulphurs ===
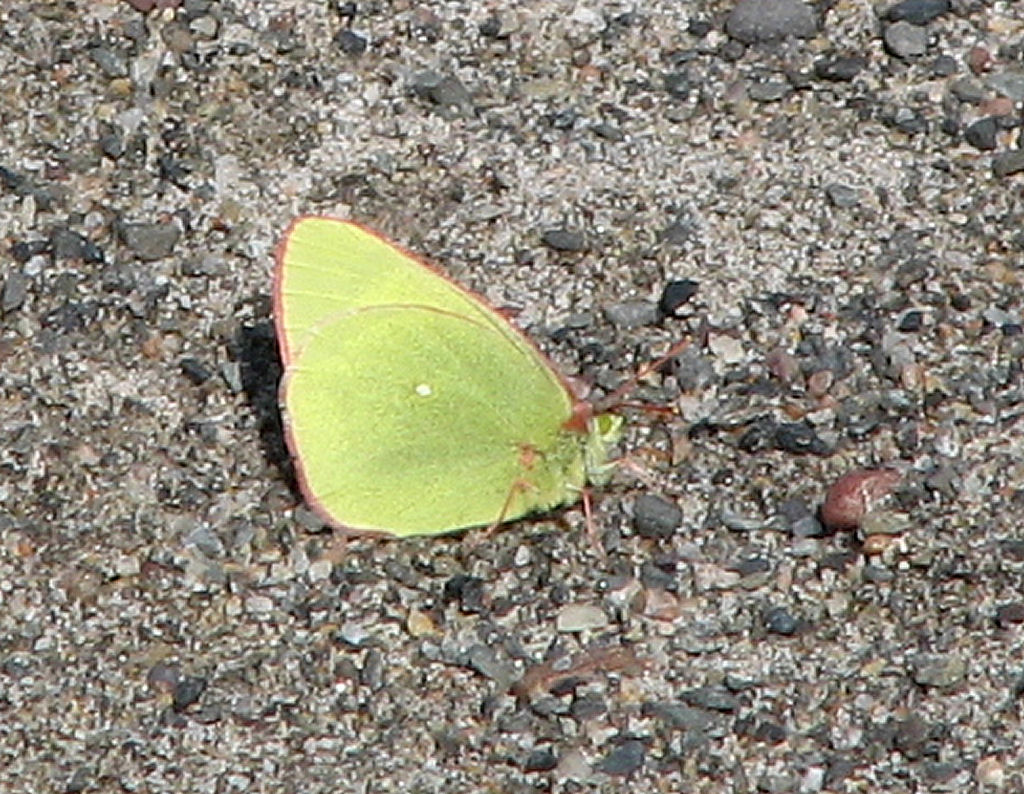
Palaeno sulphur (Colias palaeno)

- Colias philodice – clouded sulphur
- Colias eurytheme – orange sulphur
- Colias occidentalis – western sulphur
- Colias alexandra – Queen Alexandra's sulphur
- Colias christina – Christina sulphur
- Colias meadii – Mead's sulphur
- Colias johanseni – Johansen's sulphur
- Colias hecla – hecla sulphur
- Colias tyche – Booth's sulphur
- Colias canadensis – Canada sulphur
- Colias nastes – Labrador sulphur
- Colias gigantea – giant sulphur
- Colias pelidne – pelidne sulphur
- Colias interior – pink-edged sulphur
- Colias chippewa – heath sulphur
- Colias palaeno – Palaeno sulphur
- Zerene cesonia – southern dogface
- Phoebis sennae – cloudless sulphur
- Phoebis philea – orange-barred sulphur
- Eurema mexicanum – Mexican yellow
- Eurema lisa – little yellow
- Eurema nicippe – sleepy orange
- Nathalis iole – dainty sulphur

== Family Lycaenidae – harvesters, coppers, hairstreaks, and blues ==
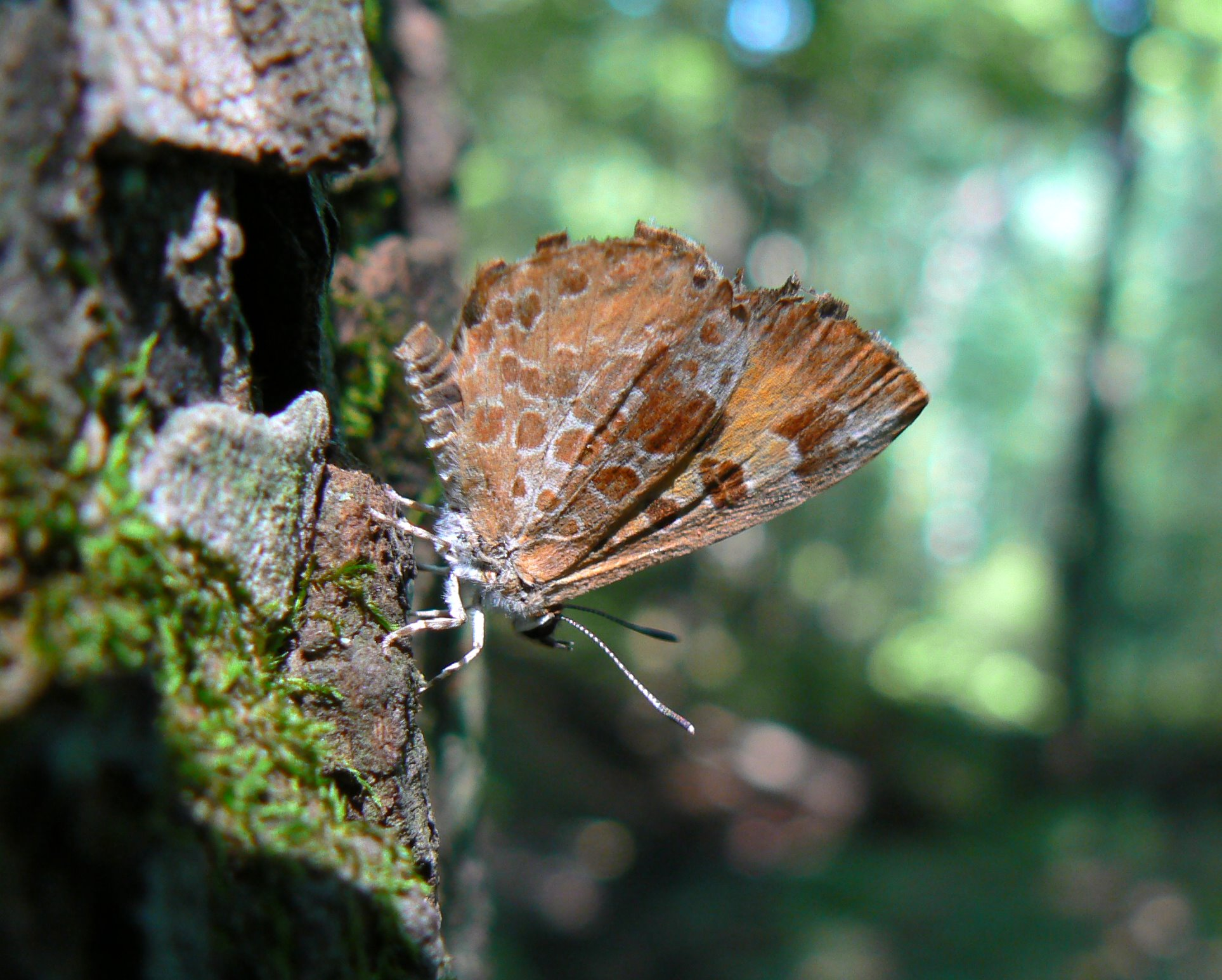
Harvester

=== Subfamily Miletinae – harvesters ===
- Feniseca tarquinius – harvester

=== Subfamily Lycaeninae – coppers ===
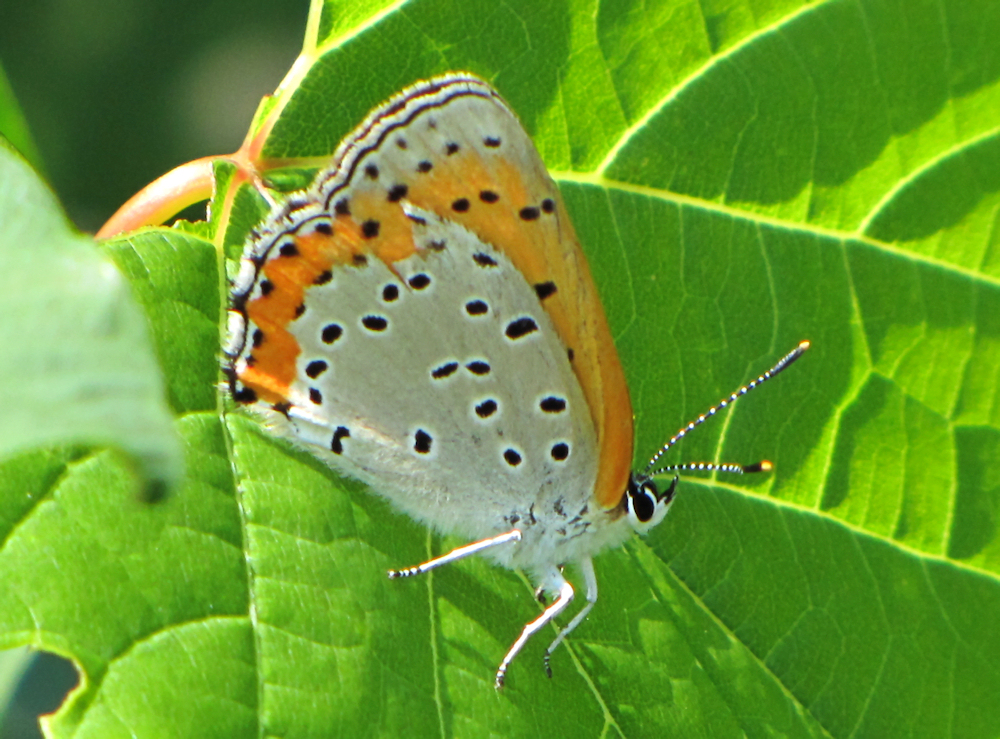
Bronze copper (Lycaena hyllus)

- Lycaena phlaeas – American copper
- Lycaena cuprea – lustrous copper
- Lycaena dione – grey copper
- Lycaena hyllus – bronze copper
- Lycaena rubidus – ruddy copper
- Lycaena heteronea – blue copper
- Lycaena epixanthe – bog copper
- Lycaena dorcas – dorcas copper
- Lycaena dospassosi – Maritime copper
- Lycaena helloides – purplish copper
- Lycaena nivalis – lilac-bordered copper
- Lycaena mariposa – mariposa copper

=== Subfamily Theclinae – hairstreaks ===
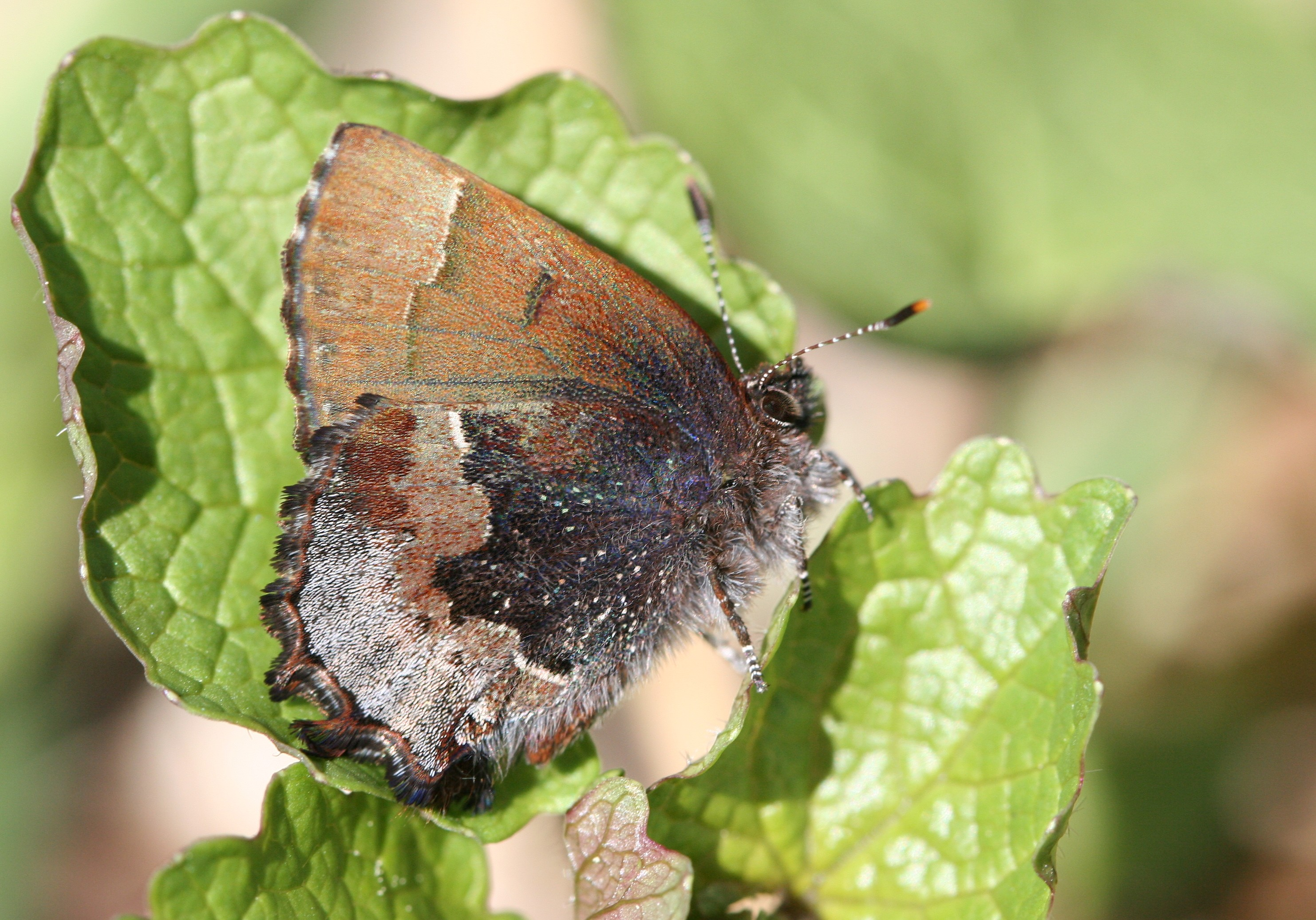
Henry's elfin (Callophrys henrici)

- Satyrium behrii – Behr's hairstreak
- Satyrium fuliginosum – sooty hairstreak
- Satyrium acadicum – Acadian hairstreak
- Satyrium californica – California hairstreak
- Satyrium sylvinum – sylvan hairstreak
- Satyrium titus – coral hairstreak
- Satyrium edwardsii – Edwards' hairstreak
- Satyrium calanus – banded hairstreak
- Satyrium caryaevorum – hickory hairstreak
- Satyrium liparops – striped hairstreak
- Satyrium saepium – hedgerow hairstreak
- Fixsenia favonius – southern hairstreak
- Calycopis cecrops – red-banded hairstreak
- Callophrys affinis – western green hairstreak
- Callophrys sheridanii – Sheridan's hairstreak
- Callophrys spinetorum – thicket hairstreak
- Callophrys johnsoni – Johnson's hairstreak
- Callophrys rosneri – Rosner's hairstreak
- Callophrys barryi – Barry's hairstreak
- Callophrys gryneus – juniper hairstreak
- Callophrys augustinus – brown elfin
- Callophrys mossii – Moss's elfin
- Callophrys polios – hoary elfin
- Callophrys irus – frosted elfin
- Callophrys henrici – Henry's elfin
- Callophrys lanoraieensis – bog elfin
- Callophrys niphon – eastern pine elfin
- Callophrys eryphon – western pine elfin
- Parrhasius m-album – white hairstreak
- Strymon melinus – grey hairstreak
- Erora laeta – early hairstreak

=== Subfamily Polyommatinae – blues ===
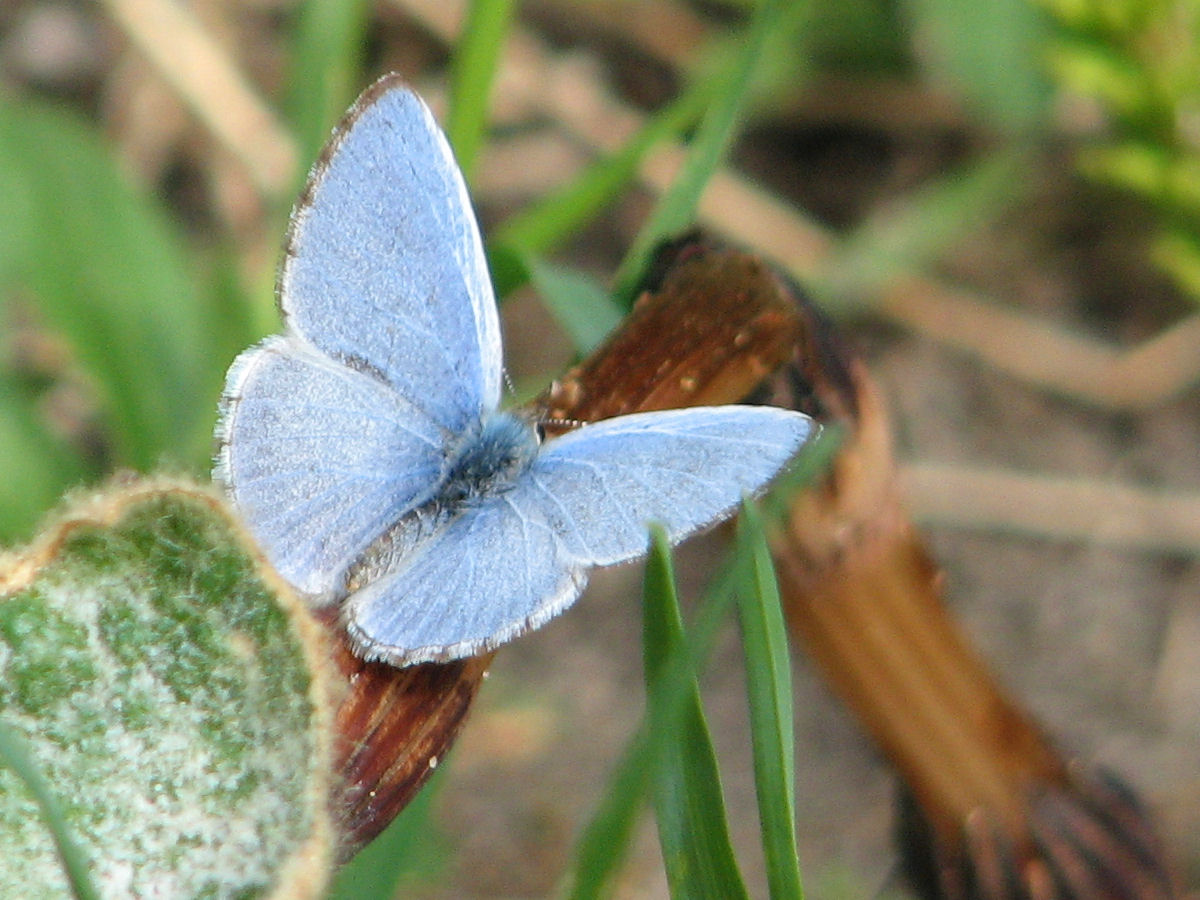
Lucia azure (Celastrina lucia)

- Leptotes marina – marine blue
- Echinargus isola – Reakirt's blue
- Cupido comyntas – eastern tailed-blue
- Cupido amyntula – western tailed-blue
- Celastrina ladon – spring azure
- Celastrina lucia – lucia azure
- Celastrina neglecta – summer azure
- Celastrina serotina – cherry gall azure
- Euphilotes battoides – square-spotted blue
- Euphilotes ancilla – Rocky Mountain dotted blue
- Glaucopsyche piasus – arrowhead blue
- Glaucopsyche lygdamus – silvery blue
- Plebejus idas – northern blue
- Plebejus melissa – Melissa blue
- Icaricia icarioides – Boisduval's blue
- Icaricia lupini – lupine blue
- Icaricia saepiolus – greenish blue
- Icaricia shasta – shasta blue
- Agriades optilete – cranberry blue
- Agriades glandon – Arctic blue
- Polyommatus icarus – common blue (invasive)

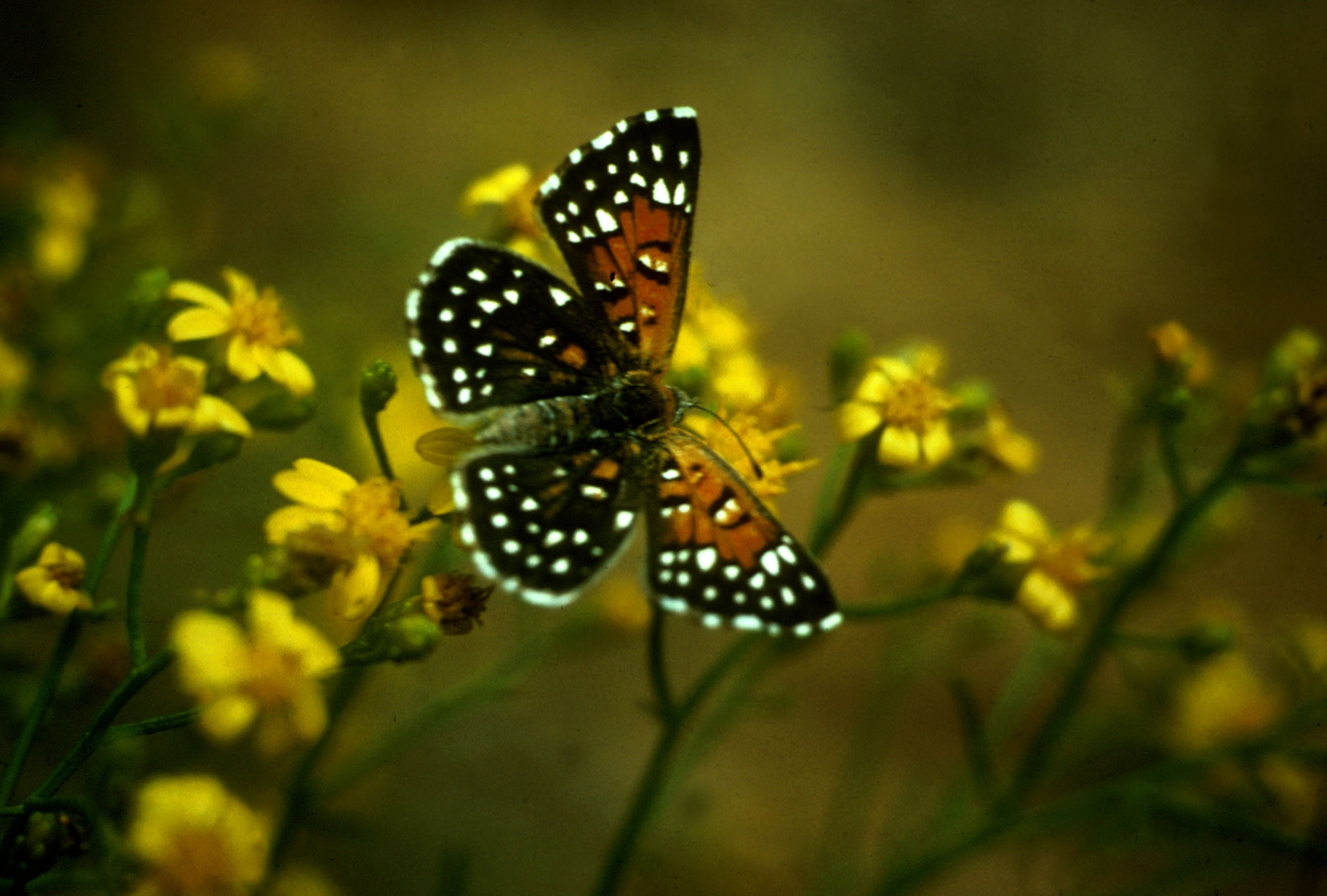
Mormon metalmark

== Family Riodinidae – metalmarks ==
- Apodemia mormo – Mormon metalmark

== Family Nymphalidae – brush-footed butterflies ==
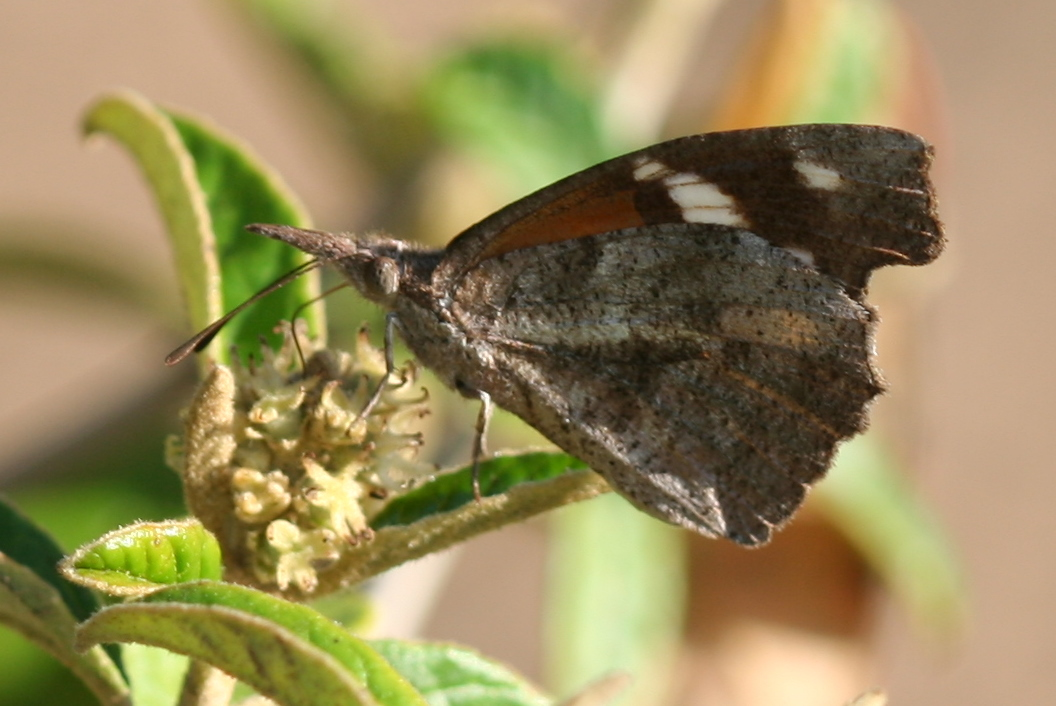
American snout

=== Subfamily Libytheinae – snouts ===
- Libytheana carinenta – American snout

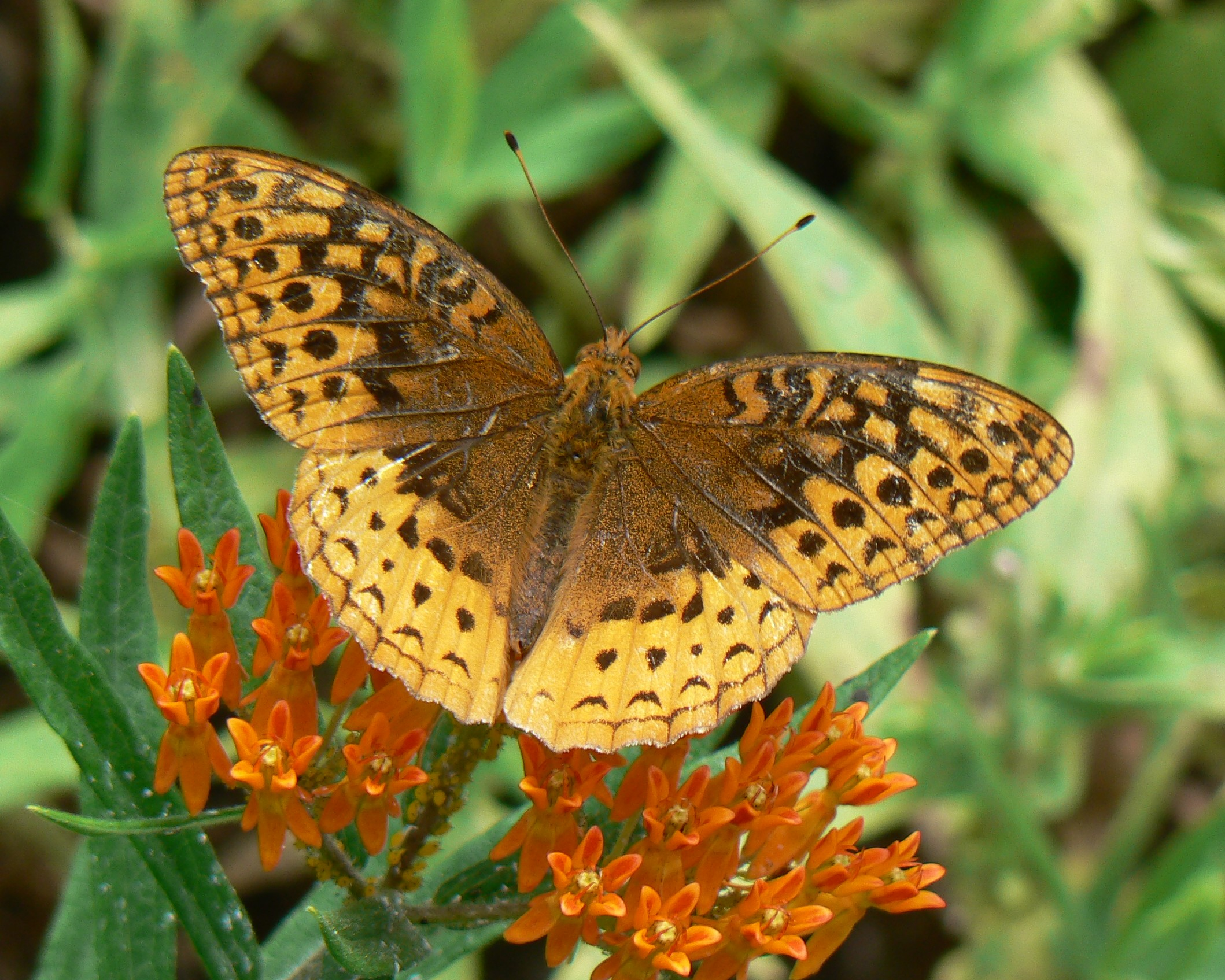
Great spangled fritillary (Speyeria cybele)

=== Subfamily Heliconiinae – fritillaries ===
- Agraulis vanillae – gulf fritillary
- Euptoieta claudia – variegated fritillary
- Euptoieta hegesia – Mexican fritillary
- Speyeria cybele – great spangled fritillary
- Speyeria aphrodite – Aphrodite fritillary
- Speyeria idalia – regal fritillary
- Speyeria edwardsii – Edwards' fritillary
- Speyeria coronis – coronis fritillary
- Speyeria zerene – zerene fritillary
- Speyeria callippe – callippe fritillary
- Speyeria atlantis – Atlantis fritillary
- Speyeria hesperis – northwestern fritillary
- Speyeria hydaspe – hydaspe fritillary
- Speyeria mormonia – Mormon fritillary
- Boloria napaea – mountain fritillary
- Boloria eunomia – bog fritillary
- Boloria selene – silver-bordered fritillary
- Boloria bellona – meadow fritillary
- Boloria frigga – Frigga fritillary
- Boloria improba – dingy fritillary
- Boloria epithore – Pacific fritillary
- Boloria polaris – Polaris fritillary
- Boloria freija – Freija fritillary
- Boloria natazhati – Beringian fritillary
- Boloria alberta – Alberta fritillary
- Boloria astarte – Astarte fritillary
- Boloria chariclea – Arctic fritillary

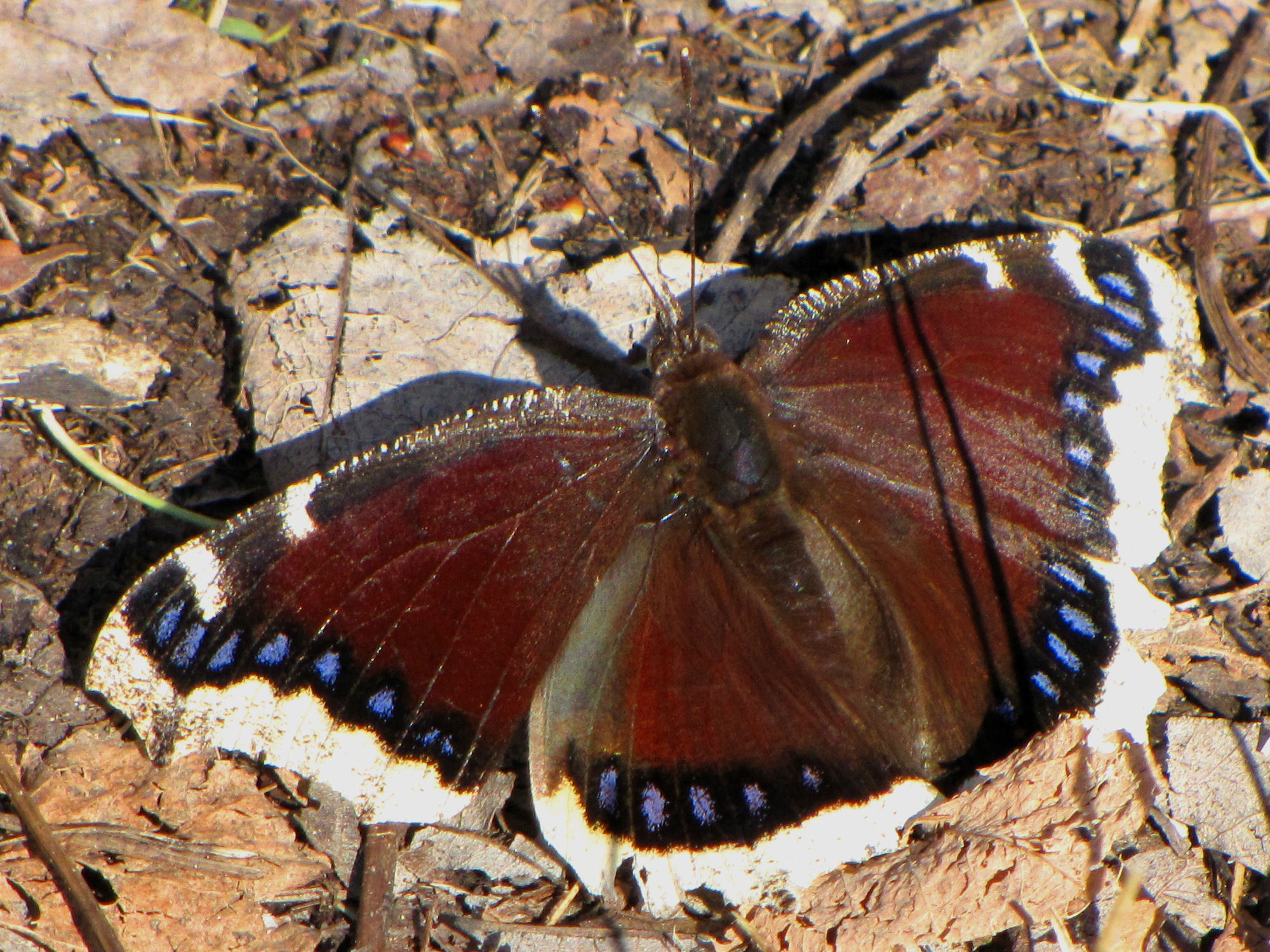
Mourning cloak (Nymphalis antiopa)

=== Subfamily Nymphalinae – anglewings, tortoiseshells, ladies, checkerspots and crescents ===
- Polygonia interrogationis – question mark
- Polygonia comma – eastern comma
- Polygonia satyrus – satyr comma
- Polygonia faunus – green comma
- Polygonia gracilis – hoary comma
- Polygonia oreas – oreas comma
- Polygonia progne – grey comma
- Nymphalis vaualbum – Compton tortoiseshell
- Nymphalis californica – California tortoiseshell
- Nymphalis antiopa – mourning cloak
- Nymphalis milberti – Milbert's tortoiseshell
- Vanessa virginiensis – American lady
- Vanessa cardui – painted lady
- Vanessa annabella – West Coast lady
- Vanessa atalanta – red admiral
- Junonia coenia – common buckeye
- Chlosyne gorgone – gorgone checkerspot
- Chlosyne nycteis – silvery checkerspot
- Chlosyne harrisii – Harris's checkerspot
- Chlosyne palla – northern checkerspot
- Chlosyne acastus – sagebrush checkerspot
- Chlosyne hoffmanni – Hoffmann's checkerspot
- Phyciodes tharos – pearl crescent
- Phyciodes cocyta – northern crescent
- Phyciodes batesii – tawny crescent
- Phyciodes pallida – pale crescent
- Phyciodes pulchella – field crescent
- Phyciodes mylitta – mylitta crescent
- Euphydryas gillettii – Gillette's checkerspot
- Euphydryas chalcedona – variable checkerspot
- Euphydryas editha – Edith's checkerspot
- Euphydryas phaeton – Baltimore checkerspot

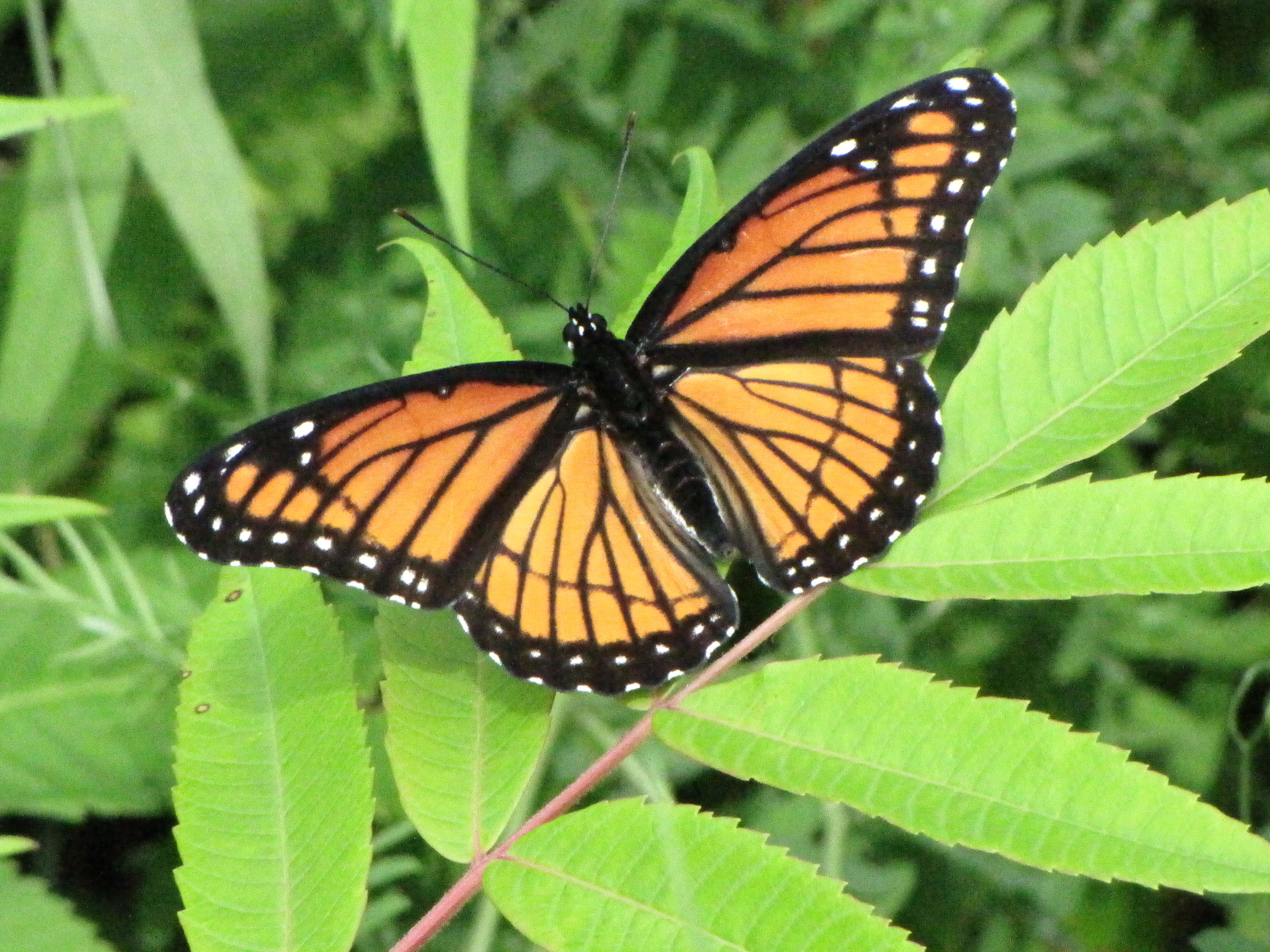
Viceroy (Limenitis archippus)

=== Subfamily Limenitidinae – admirals ===
- Limenitis arthemis – white admiral, red-spotted purple
- Limenitis archippus – viceroy
- Limenitis weidemeyerii – Weidemeyer's admiral
- Limenitis lorquini – Lorquin's admiral

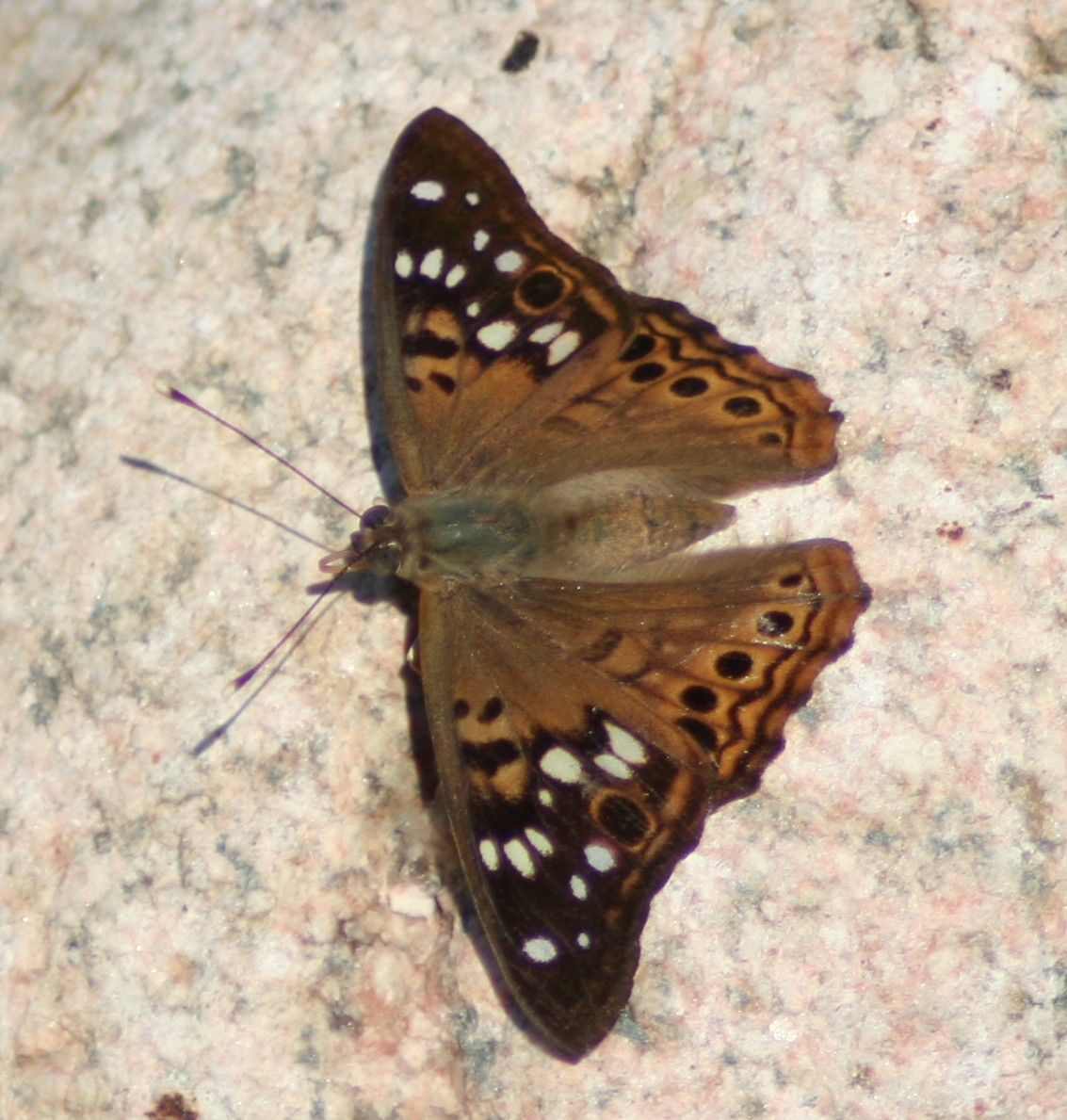
Hackberry emperor (Asterocampa celtis)

=== Subfamily Apaturinae – emperors ===
- Asterocampa celtis – hackberry emperor
- Asterocampa clyton – tawny emperor

=== Subfamily Satyrinae – satyrs and wood-nymphs ===
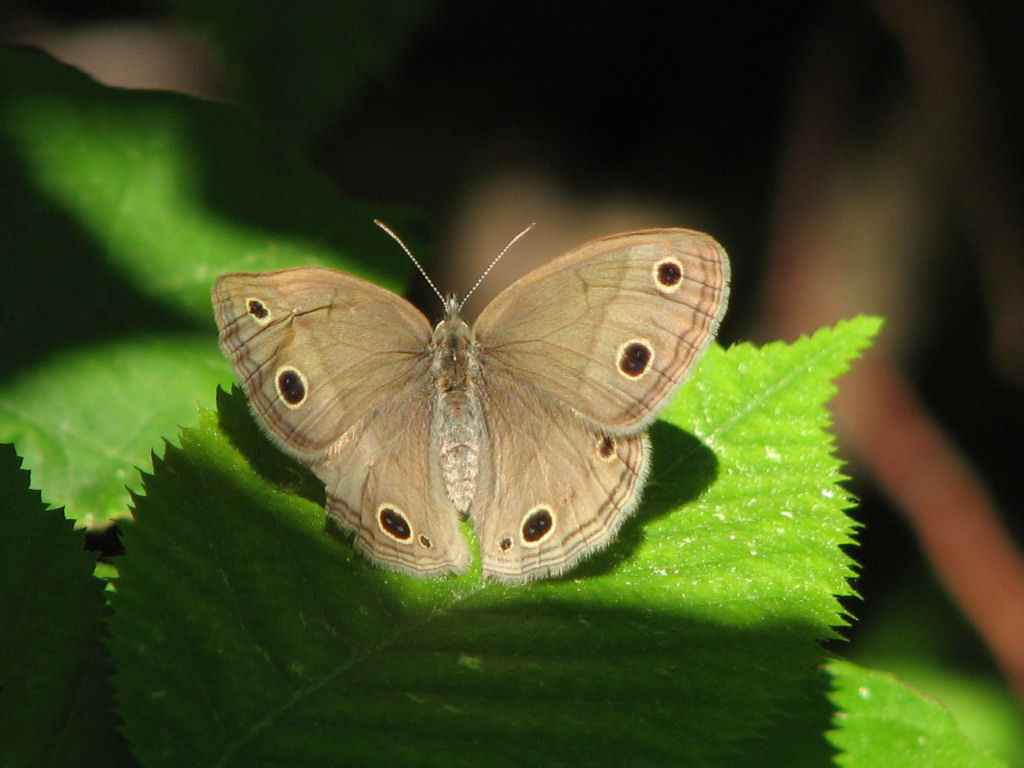
Little wood-satyr (Megisto cymela)

- Enodia anthedon – northern pearly-eye
- Satyrodes eurydice – eyed brown
- Satyrodes appalachia – Appalachian brown
- Megisto cymela – little wood-satyr
- Coenonympha tullia – common ringlet
- Coenonympha nipisiquit – maritime ringlet
- Cercyonis pegala – common wood-nymph
- Cercyonis sthenele – Great Basin wood-nymph
- Cercyonis oetus – small wood-nymph
- Erebia vidleri – Vidler's alpine
- Erebia rossii – Ross's alpine
- Erebia disa – Disa alpine
- Erebia mancinus – taiga alpine
- Erebia magdalena – Magdalena alpine
- Erebia mackinleyensis – Mt. McKinley alpine
- Erebia fasciata – banded alpine
- Erebia discoidalis – red-disked alpine
- Erebia pawlowskii – yellow-dotted alpine
- Erebia youngi – four-dotted alpine
- Erebia anyuica – scree alpine
- Erebia lafontainei – reddish alpine
- Erebia epipsodea – common alpine
- Neominois ridingsii – Ridings' satyr
- Oeneis nevadensis – great arctic
- Oeneis macounii – Macoun's arctic or Canada arctic
- Oeneis chryxus – chryxus arctic or brown arctic
- Oeneis uhleri – Uhler's arctic
- Oeneis alberta – Alberta arctic
- Oeneis bore – white-veined arctic
- Oeneis jutta – Jutta arctic
- Oeneis melissa – Melissa arctic
- Oeneis polixenes – Polixenes arctic
- Oeneis rosovi – Philip's arctic
- Oeneis alpina – sentinel arctic

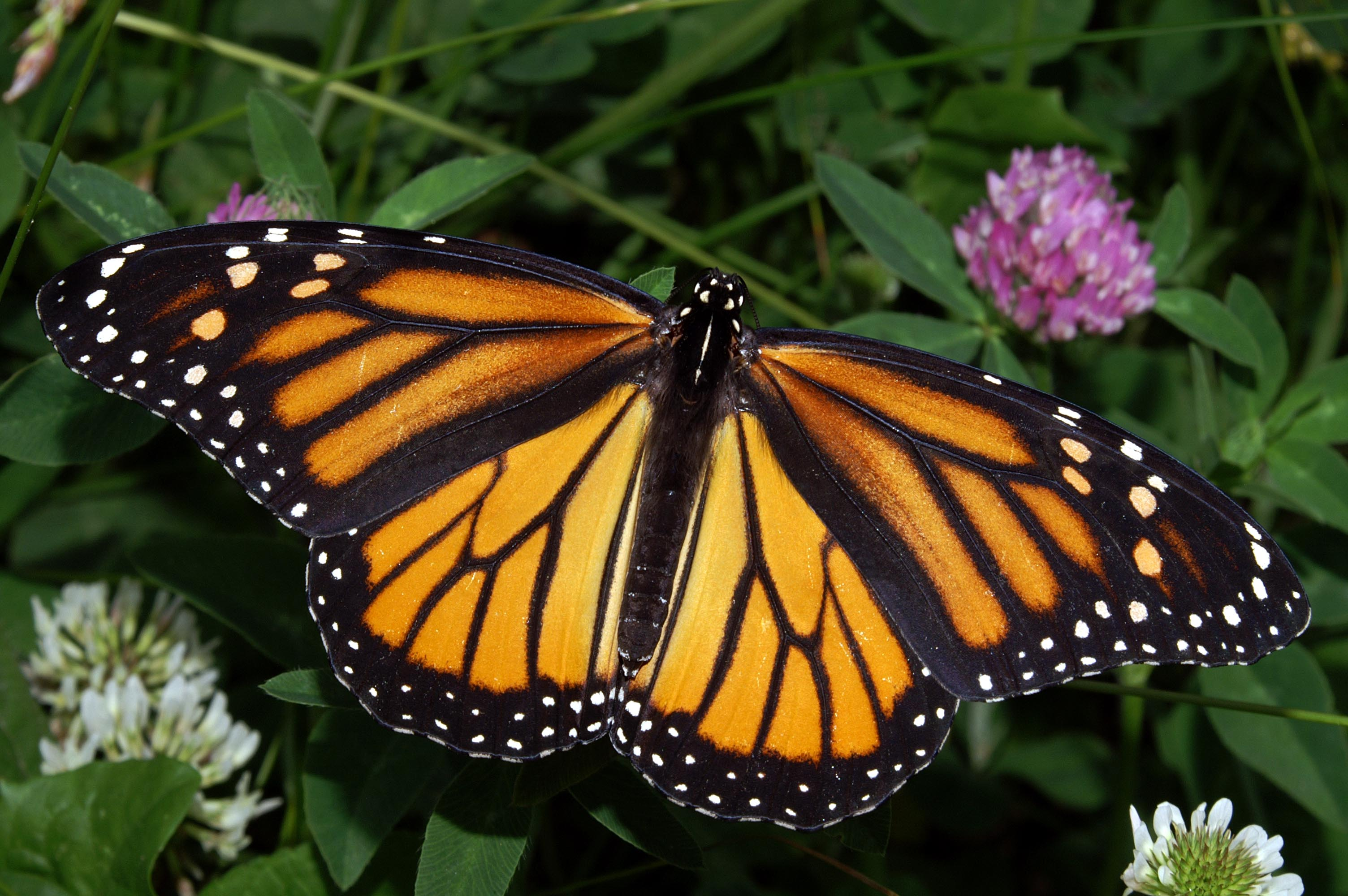
Monarch (Danaus plexippus)

=== Subfamily Danainae – milkweed butterflies ===
- Danaus plexippus – monarch

=== Subfamily Charaxinae – leafwings ===
- Anaea andria – goatweed leafing

== See also ==
- List of butterflies of North America
- List of moths of Canada
- List of damselflies of Canada
- List of dragonflies of Canada
