= Erebia polaris =

Conservation status
- Least Concern (IUCN 3.1)

Scientific classification
- Kingdom: Animalia
- Phylum: Arthropoda
- Clade: Pancrustacea
- Class: Insecta
- Order: Lepidoptera
- Family: Nymphalidae
- Genus: Erebia
- Species: E. polaris

Binomial name
- Erebia polaris Staudinger, 1871

Synonyms
- Erebia medusa polaris

Species of butterfly

Erebia polaris, the Arctic woodland ringlet, is a butterfly of the family Nymphalidae. It is found in Lapland and boreal Asia.

== Description ==
The Arctic woodland ringlet is a medium-sized butterfly with a wingspan of between 33 and 42 mm (1.3 and 1.7 in). Females tend to be a little larger than males. The upperside of both the forewings and hindwings are dark brown with black eyespots with red margins in a row near the edge. In the male the eyespots are small and do not usually have a white centre except possibly the front one. In the female they may be no bigger but many of them have white centres and they may be more numerous forming a continuous line. The underside of the wings is similar to the upperside. This butterfly can be distinguished from the rather similar Lapland ringlet (Erebia embla) and the Arran brown (Erebia ligea) by the fact that it has no white blotches on the under surfaces of the wings. It can be distinguished from the Arctic ringlet (Erebia disa) by the fact that it always has eyespots on its hindwings.

== Distribution and habitat ==
The Arctic woodland ringlet is native to northern Europe, occurring in northern Norway, Finland and Lapland, up to a height of 400 m (1,312 ft) above sea level. It is typically found on sandy river banks, on damp grassland, at the edges of meadows that are prone to flooding and in drier places with shelter provided by trees and bushes.

== Biology ==
These butterflies are on the wing in July. Females lay their eggs on grasses such as Festuca ovina, Milium effusum and Poa palustris, the larval host plants. The larvae take nearly two years to develop and are a light tan or pale green with longitudinal stripes including a medial dark stripe.

== Status ==
The IUCN lists this species as being of "least concern" as it is not believed to be facing any major threats.
