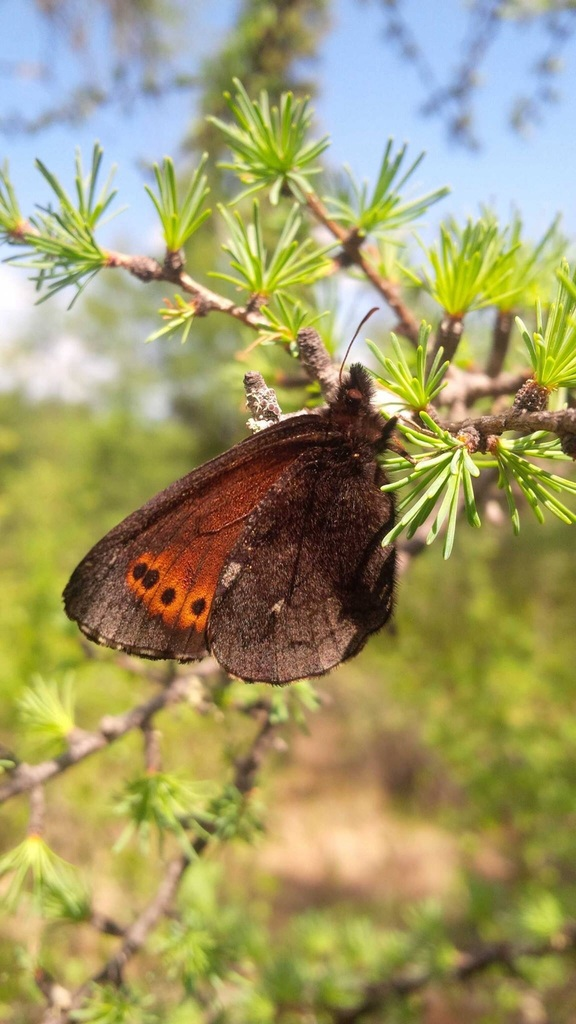

Scientific classification
- Domain: Eukaryota
- Kingdom: Animalia
- Phylum: Arthropoda
- Class: Insecta
- Order: Lepidoptera
- Family: Nymphalidae
- Genus: Erebia
- Species: E. mancinus

Binomial name
- Erebia mancinus Doubleday, 1849

= Erebia mancinus =

Taiga alpine

Species of butterfly

Erebia mancinus, the taiga alpine, is a member of the subfamily Satyrinae of the family Nymphalidae. It lives in subarctic North America from Labrador, northern Quebec, and northern Ontario, through the northern Prairie Provinces, northern British Columbia, and the interior of the Northwest Territories to Yukon and Alaska. It also ranges south in the mountains as far as Banff, Alberta. The habitat consists of black spruce-sphagnum bogs.

Adults are on wing in late June and July.

The larvae probably feed on sedges or grasses.

== Similar species ==
- Disa alpine (E. disa)
- Ross's alpine (E. rossii)
- Four-dotted alpine (E. youngi)
