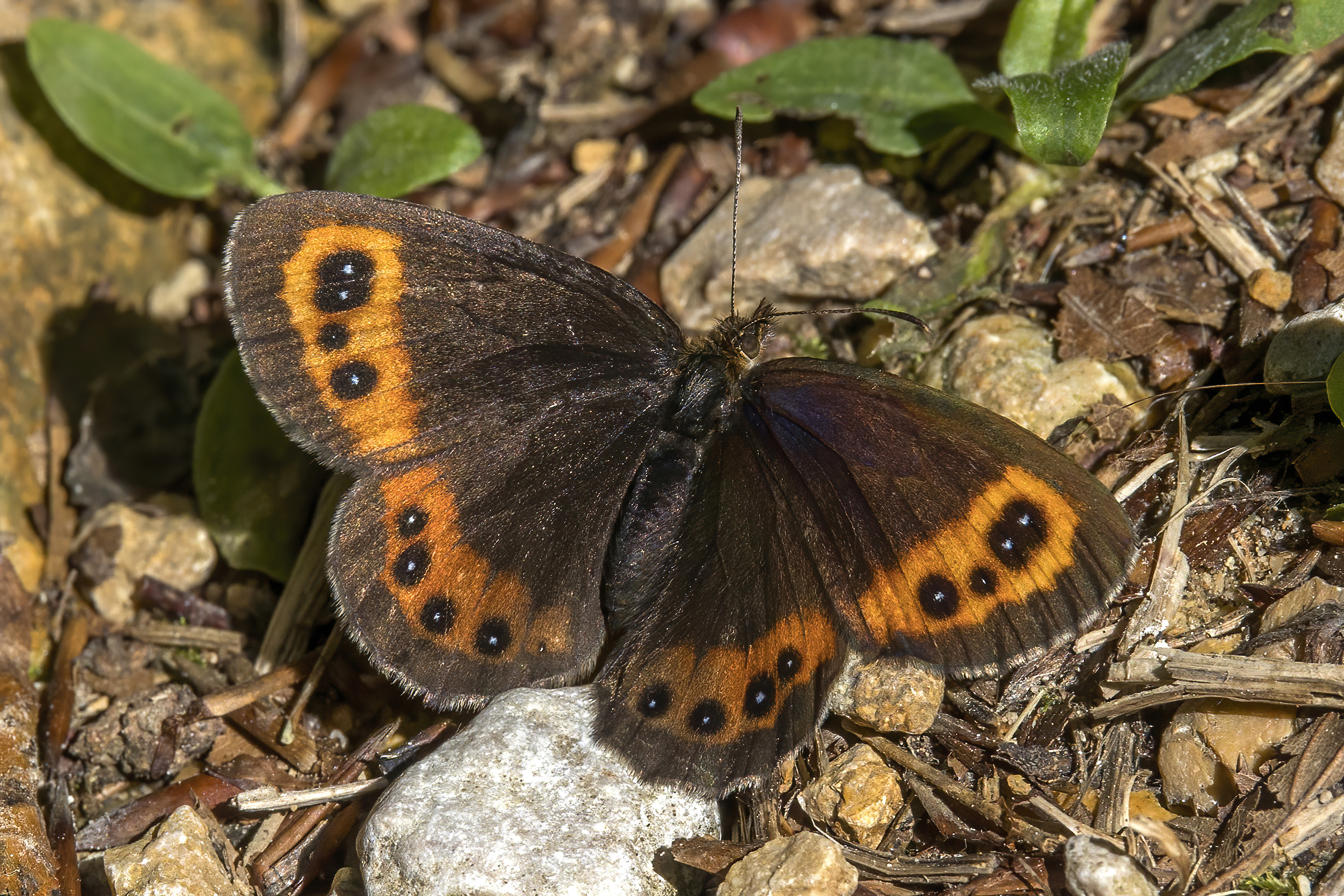

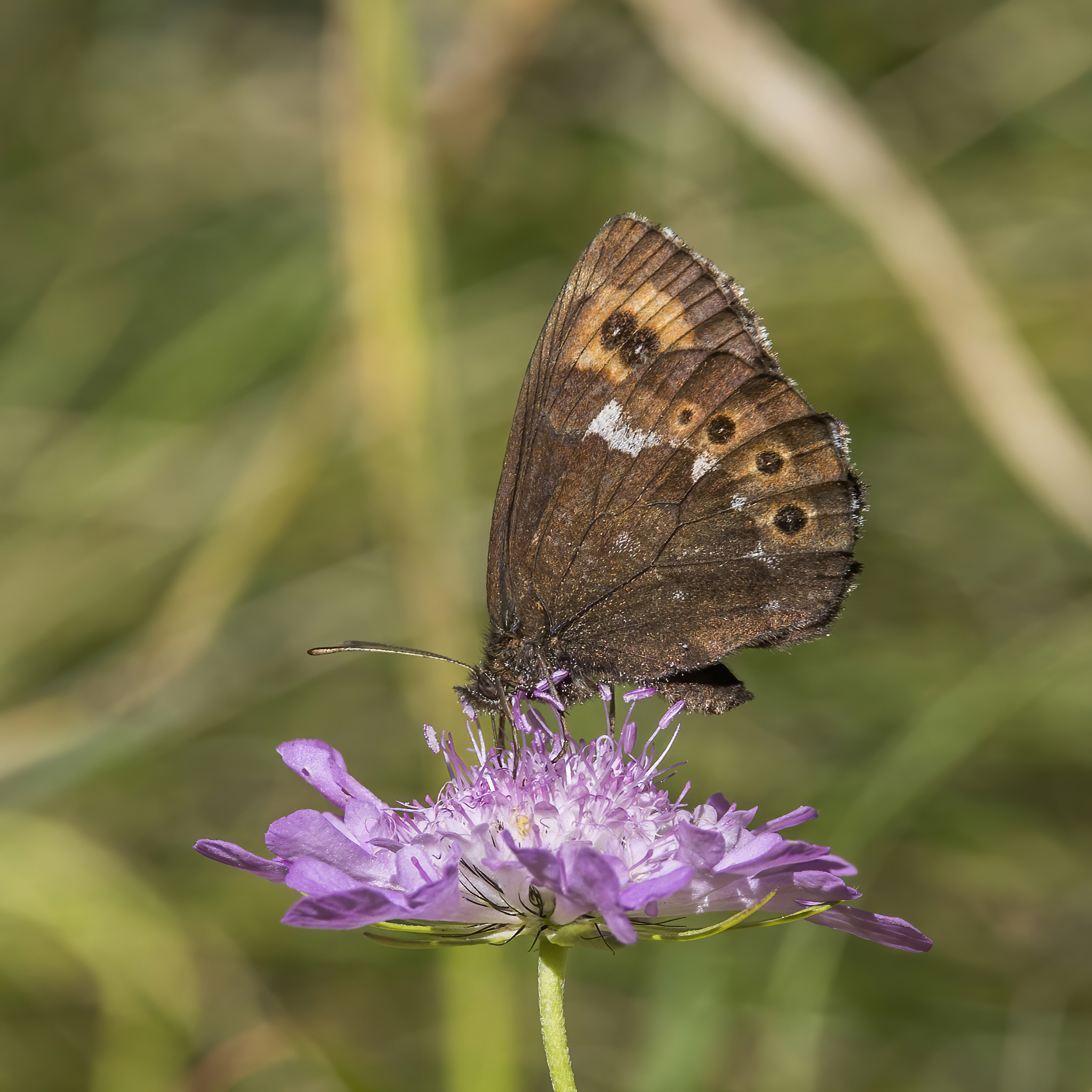
- Both males in Romania

Scientific classification
- Kingdom: Animalia
- Phylum: Arthropoda
- Clade: Pancrustacea
- Class: Insecta
- Order: Lepidoptera
- Family: Nymphalidae
- Genus: Erebia
- Species: E. ligea

Binomial name
- Erebia ligea (Linnaeus, 1758)

= Erebia ligea =

Arran brown

Species of butterfly

Erebia ligea, the Arran brown, is a member of the subfamily Satyrinae of the family Nymphalidae. This brown is widespread in south-eastern and northern Europe. It prefers mixed woodlands at low altitudes. It is rarely seen in open areas. This species was first described by Carl Linnaeus in his 1758 10th edition of Systema Naturae, and the type locality is Sweden.

== Description ==
The Arran brown is a medium-sized butterfly with a wingspan of between 30 and 46 mm (1.2 and 1.8 in). Females tend to be a little larger than males. The upperside of both the forewings and hindwings is dark greyish brown with a reddish-orange strip near the margin along which runs a series of black spots. Many of the spots are small but some have white centres. The underside of the forewing is dark brown with a reddish strip with black, white-centred eyespots near the outer edge. The underside of the hindwing is brown, edged with a row of more or less distinct dark coloured eyespots. The basal side of these is close to the centre of wing and there are one or two patches of white. The basal part of the hindwing of the female is a darker brown than the rest of the wing. Wheeler (1903) gives a short description

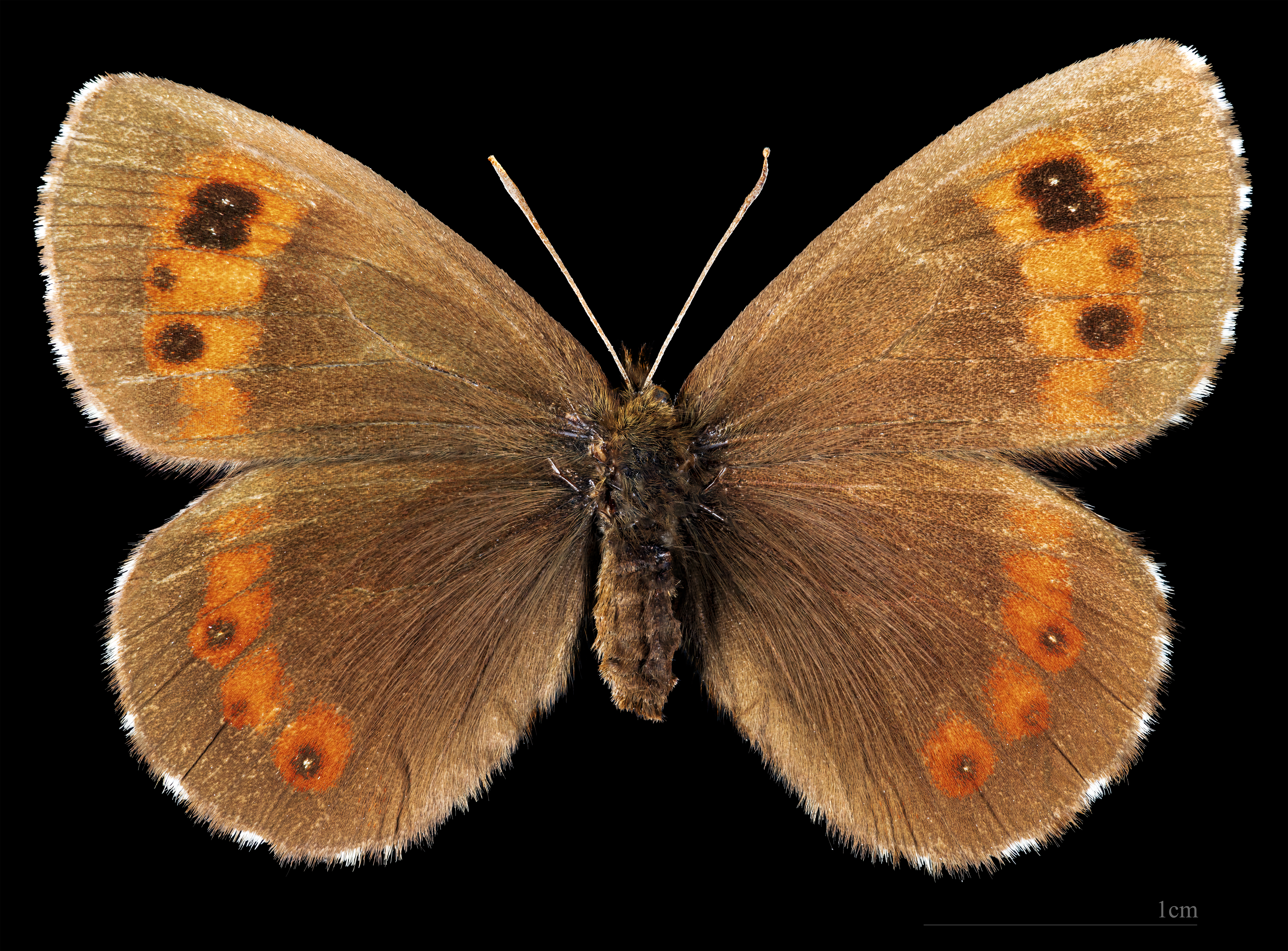
Erebia ligea ligea ♀

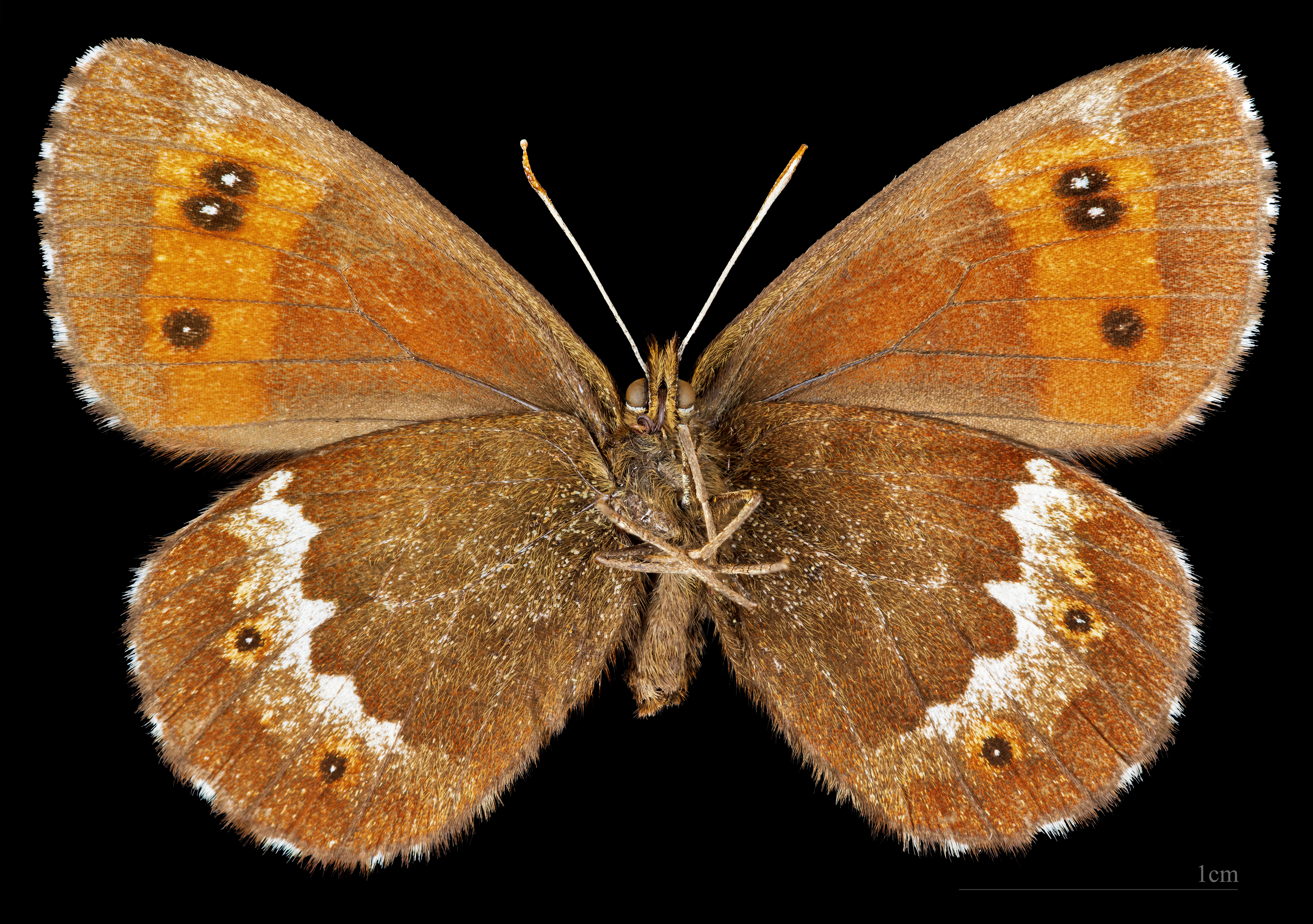
Erebia ligea ligea ♀ △

This butterfly can be distinguished from the rather similar Lapland ringlet (Erebia embla) and the Arctic ringlet (Erebia disa) by the fact that it has white blotches on the under surfaces of the hindwing and those butterflies do not. It can also be distinguished from the Arctic ringlet by the fact that it always has eyespots on its hindwings while the upperside of the Arctic ringlet's wings are plain brown. Another very similar species is the dewy ringlet, but that has a more rusty red forewing and the red strip along the underside of the wings is not continuous.

It is questionable whether this butterfly occurs in the British Isles but historical collections of the Scotch argus (Erebia aethiops) contain some specimens of Arran brown among the very similar specimens of Scottish argus. The original record is from the Isle of Arran, in the Clyde Isles in Scotland, in 1803, and it is from this that the butterfly gets its English name.

== Distribution and habitat ==
The Arran brown is native to northern and south-eastern Europe.

male, Wengen, Switzerland

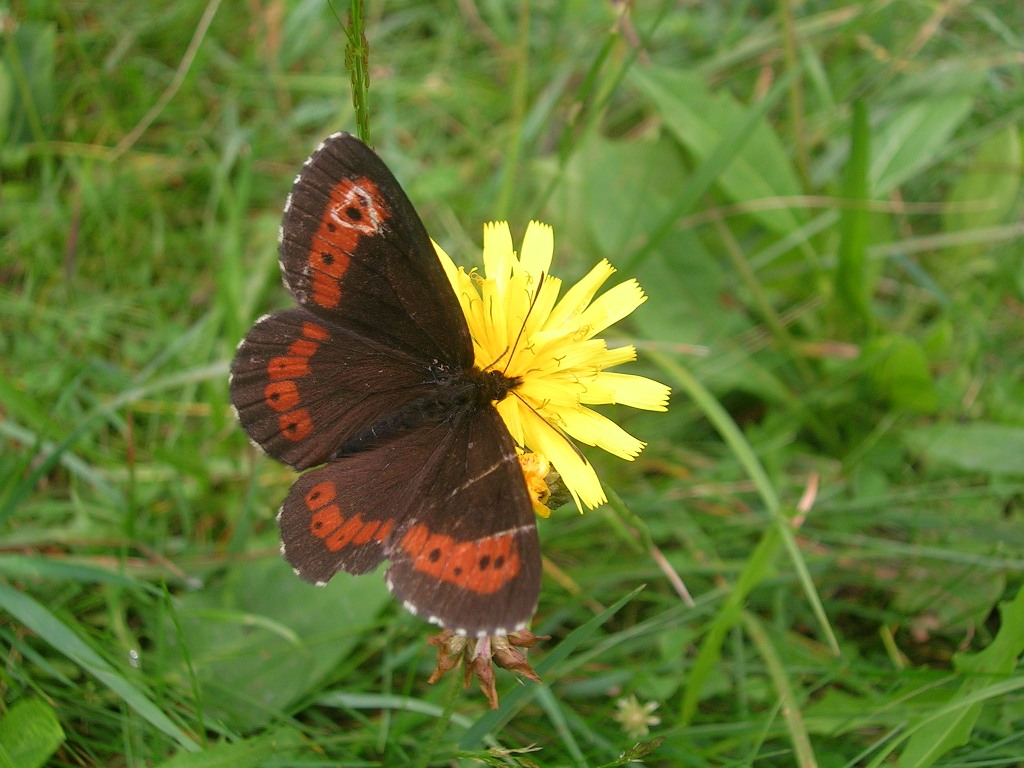
Specimen from Oslo

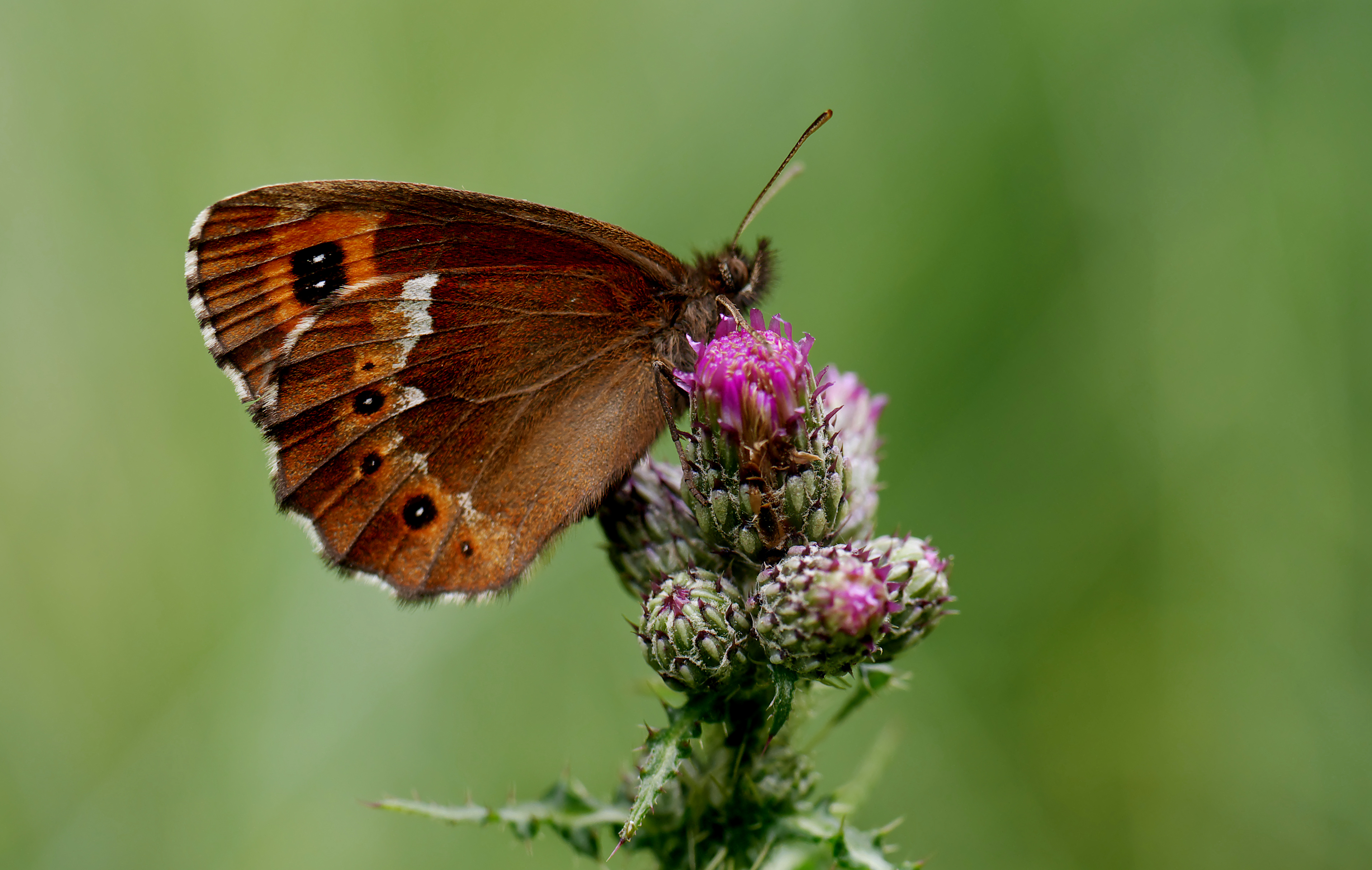
Underside view showing the typical white streak

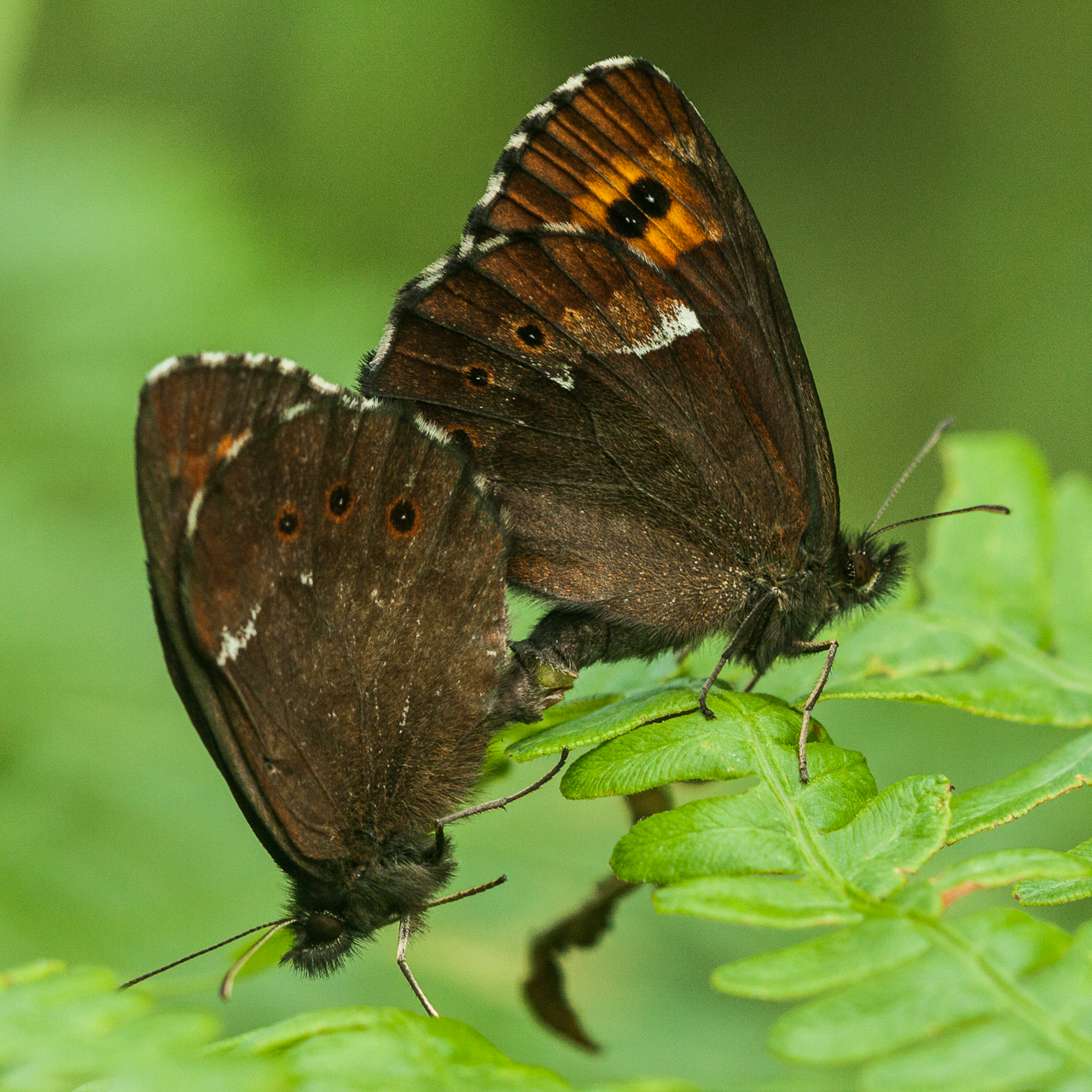
Mating pair

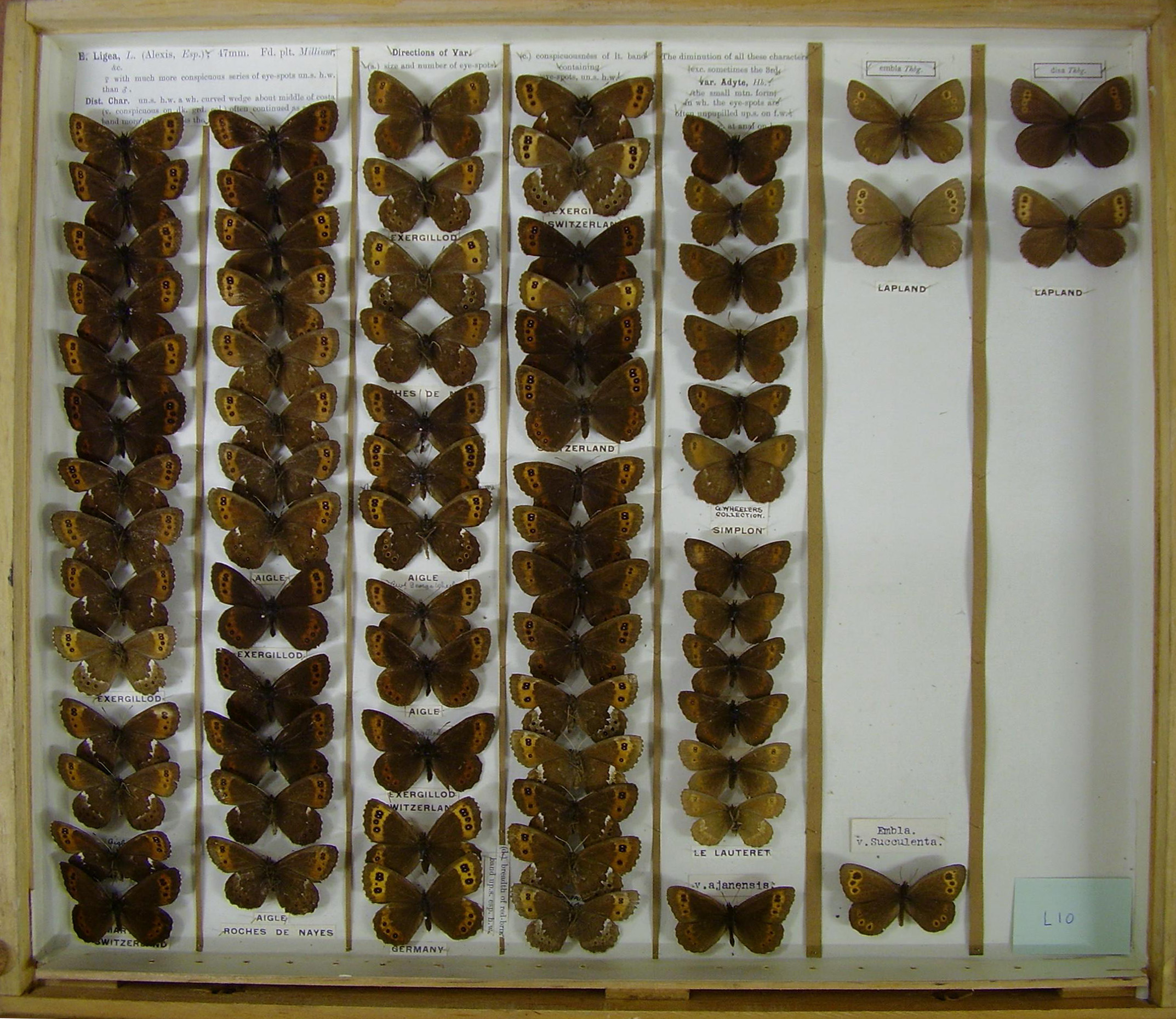
Museum drawer of Erebia ligea (Langham and Wheeler collection - Ulster Museum)

== Life cycle ==
Females lay their eggs on grasses and sedges. In Finland the larvae take two years to develop and overwinter twice as caterpillars. In that country the numbers fluctuate and recently have been more numerous in odd-numbered years.
