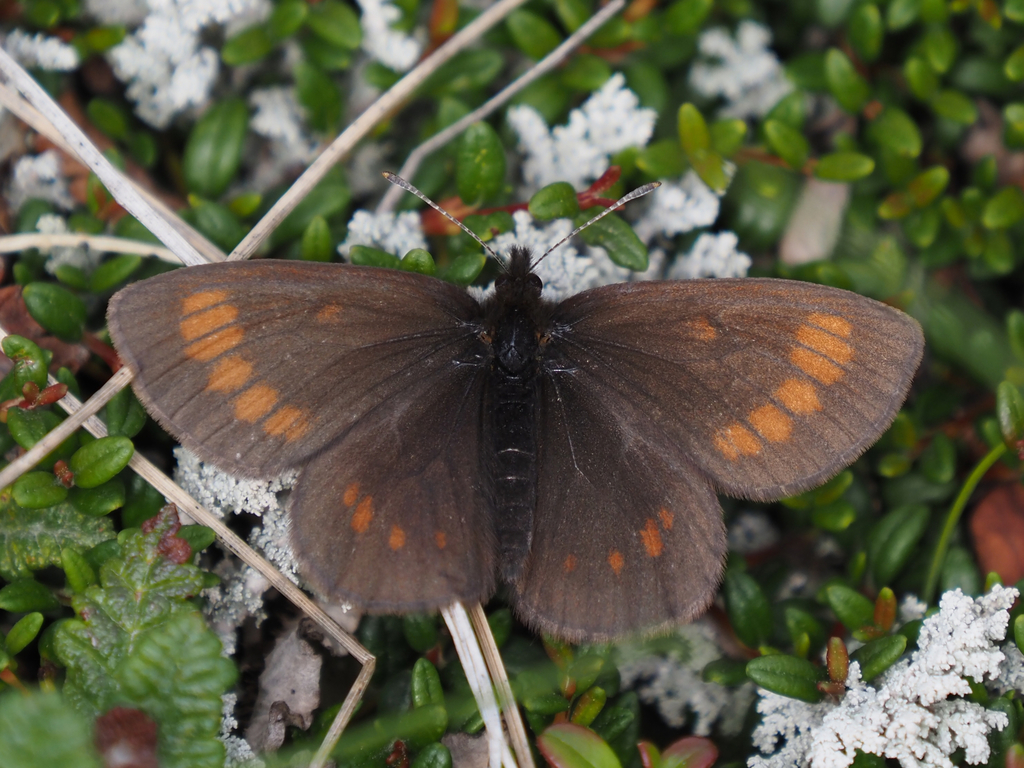

Scientific classification
- Kingdom: Animalia
- Phylum: Arthropoda
- Class: Insecta
- Order: Lepidoptera
- Family: Nymphalidae
- Genus: Erebia
- Species: E. pawloskii

Binomial name
- Erebia pawloskii Ménétriés, 1859

Subspecies
- Five, see text

Synonyms
- Erebia herzi Christoph, 1889; Erebia pawloskii var. sajana Staudinger, 1894 (eastern Sayan mountains); Erebia theano pawloskii ab. penultima Warren, 1931; Erebia theano pawloskii f. aequalis Warren, 1936; Erebia sofia var. alaskensis W. Holland, 1900; Erebia ethela W. H. Edwards, 1891

= Erebia pawloskii =

Species of butterfly

Erebia pawloskii, commonly known as the yellow-dotted alpine, is a member of the subfamily Satyrinae of the family Nymphalidae. It is found in North America in northern British Columbia, Yukon, and Alaska. It is also found in the Sayan Mountains, and from northern Mongolia to Yakutia and Kamchatka. The habitat consists of grassy areas in and above wet tundra, as well as bogs.

The wingspan is 29–38 mm. Adults are on wing from July to mid-August.

The larvae feed on Carex species.

"Erebia pawloskii" is now the accepted spelling for the yellow-dotted alpine, rather than "Erebia pawlowskii".

== Subspecies ==
- E. p. pawloskii
- E. p. demmia B. Warren, 1936 (Colorado)
- E. p. ethela W. H. Edwards, 1891 (Wyoming)
- E. p. canadensis B. Warren, 1931 (Manitoba)
- E. p. alaskensis W. Holland, 1900 - Theano alpine (Alaska, Yukon, northern British Columbia)
