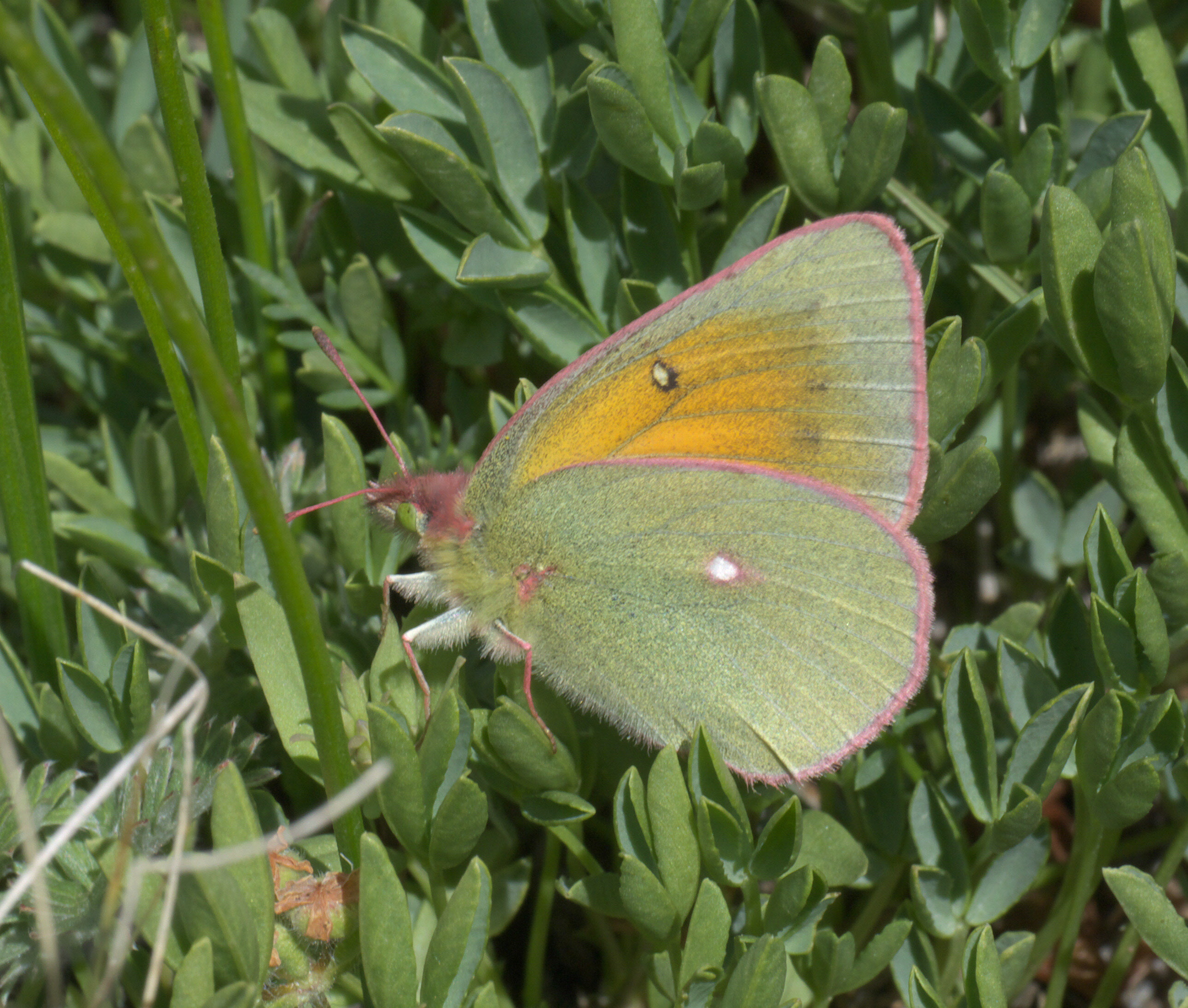

Conservation status
- Apparently Secure (NatureServe)

Scientific classification
- Kingdom: Animalia
- Phylum: Arthropoda
- Clade: Pancrustacea
- Class: Insecta
- Order: Lepidoptera
- Family: Pieridae
- Genus: Colias
- Species: C. meadii

Binomial name
- Colias meadii W.H. Edwards, 1871

Synonyms
- Eurymus meadii Dyar, 1903; Colias elis Strecker, 1885

= Colias meadii =

Species of butterfly

Colias meadii, the Mead's sulphur, is a butterfly in the family Pieridae found in North America. Its range includes the Rocky Mountains in Canada and the United States.

Flight period is from July to August. It inhabits arctic-alpine tundra and rocky slopes, in high mountain areas at or near tree lines.

Wingspan is from 35 to 44 mm.

Larvae feed on Trifolium spp. Astragalus alpinus, Oxytropis deflexa and Vicia americana. Adults feed on flower nectar from alpine sunflower and asters.

== Subspecies ==
Listed alphabetically:

- C. m. elis Strecker, 1885 (Alberta, British Columbia)
- C. m. lemhiensis Curtis & Ferris, 1985 (Idaho, Montana)
- C. m. meadii (Colorado, Utah, New Mexico, Wyoming, Montana)
