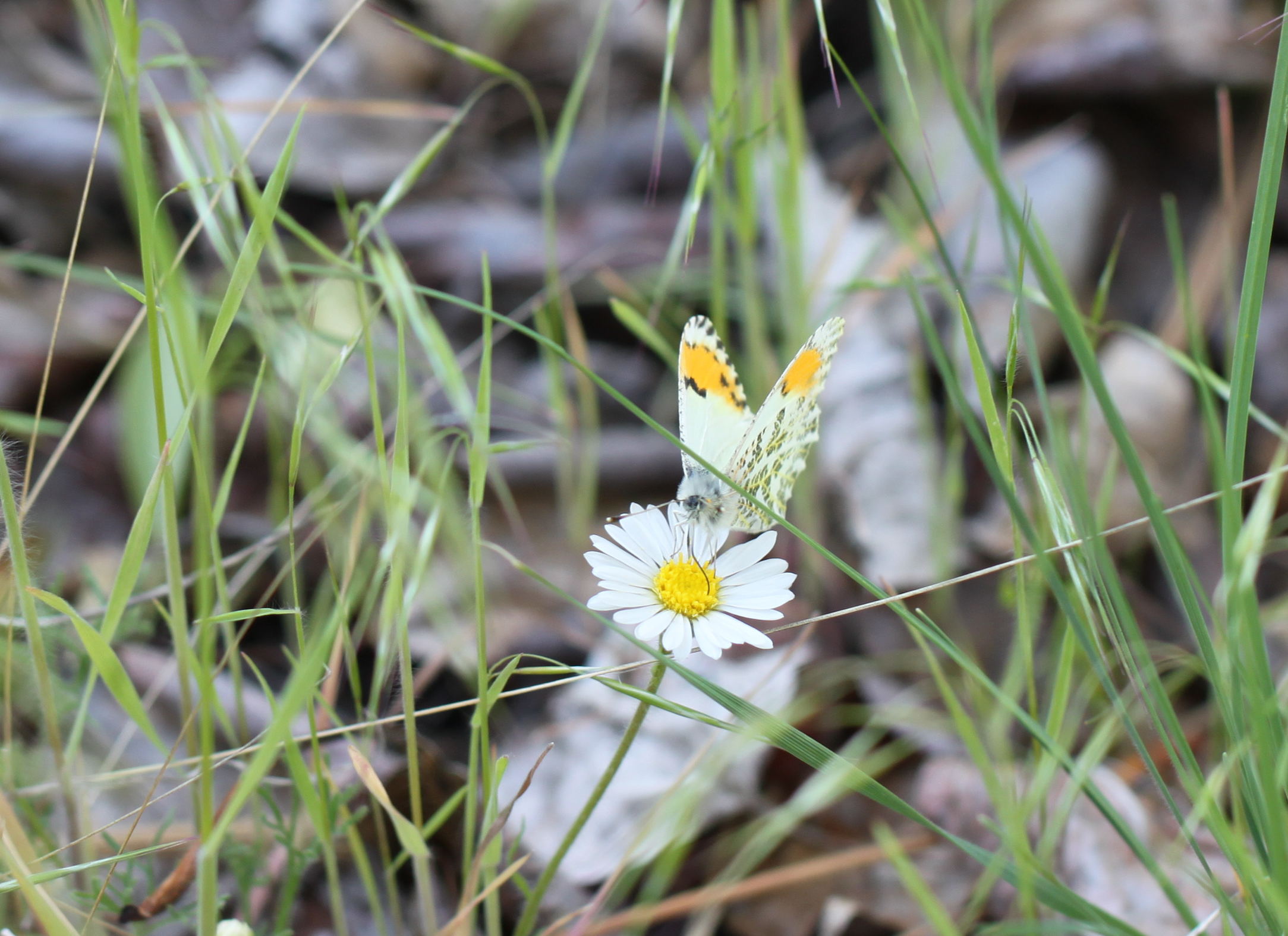

Scientific classification
- Kingdom: Animalia
- Phylum: Arthropoda
- Class: Insecta
- Order: Lepidoptera
- Family: Pieridae
- Genus: Anthocharis
- Species: A. stella

Binomial name
- Anthocharis stella (Edwards, 1872)

Subspecies
- A. s. stella; A. s. browningi

= Anthocharis stella =

Stella orangetip

Species of butterfly

Anthocharis stella, the stella orangetip, is a species of butterfly found mainly in the Rocky Mountains in the United States where its caterpillar feeds on different kinds of rock cress. It has two subspecies.
