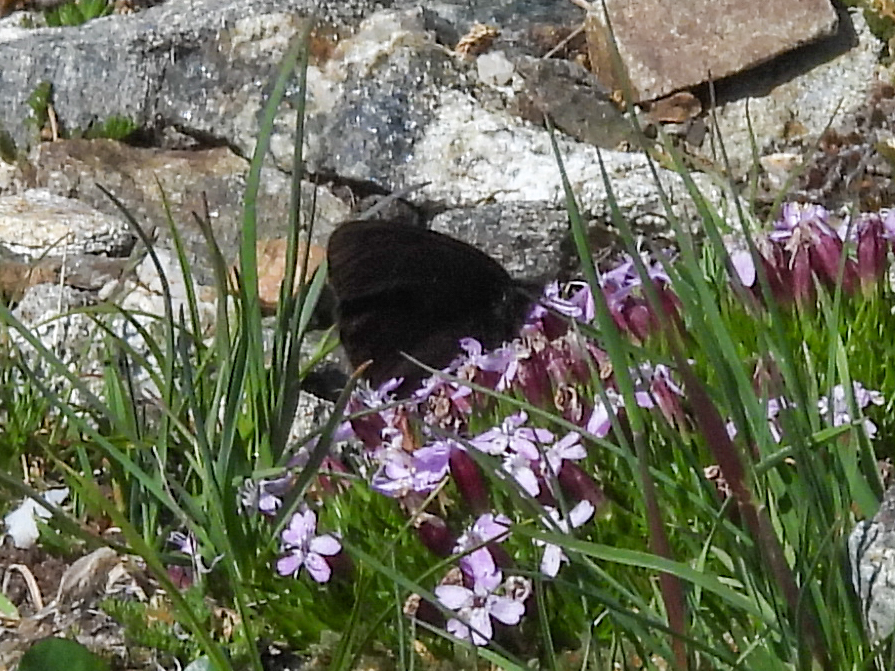

Scientific classification
- Kingdom: Animalia
- Phylum: Arthropoda
- Class: Insecta
- Order: Lepidoptera
- Family: Nymphalidae
- Genus: Erebia
- Species: E. magdalena

Binomial name
- Erebia magdalena Strecker, 1880

= Magdalena alpine =

Species of butterfly

The Magdalena alpine (Erebia magdalena) is a member of the subfamily Satyrinae of the family Nymphalidae. It is found in North America from Montana, Colorado, Utah, and New Mexico, and in Canada in a small part of the Willmore Wilderness Park, Alberta, and adjacent British Columbia, in Stone Mountain Provincial Park in northern British Columbia, and on an isolated nunatak in Kluane National Park and Reserve, Yukon. The habitat consists of rockslides near vegetation, at or above the treeline.

The wingspan is 41–45 mm. The wings are black above and below. Adults are on the wing from late June and July.

The larvae probably feed on grasses, sedges or rushes.

== Subspecies ==
- E. m. magdalena
- E. m. hilchie Kemal & Koçak, 2007 (northern Rocky Mountains, west-central Alberta and east-central British Columbia)

== Similar species ==
- Mt. McKinley alpine (E. mackinleyensis)
