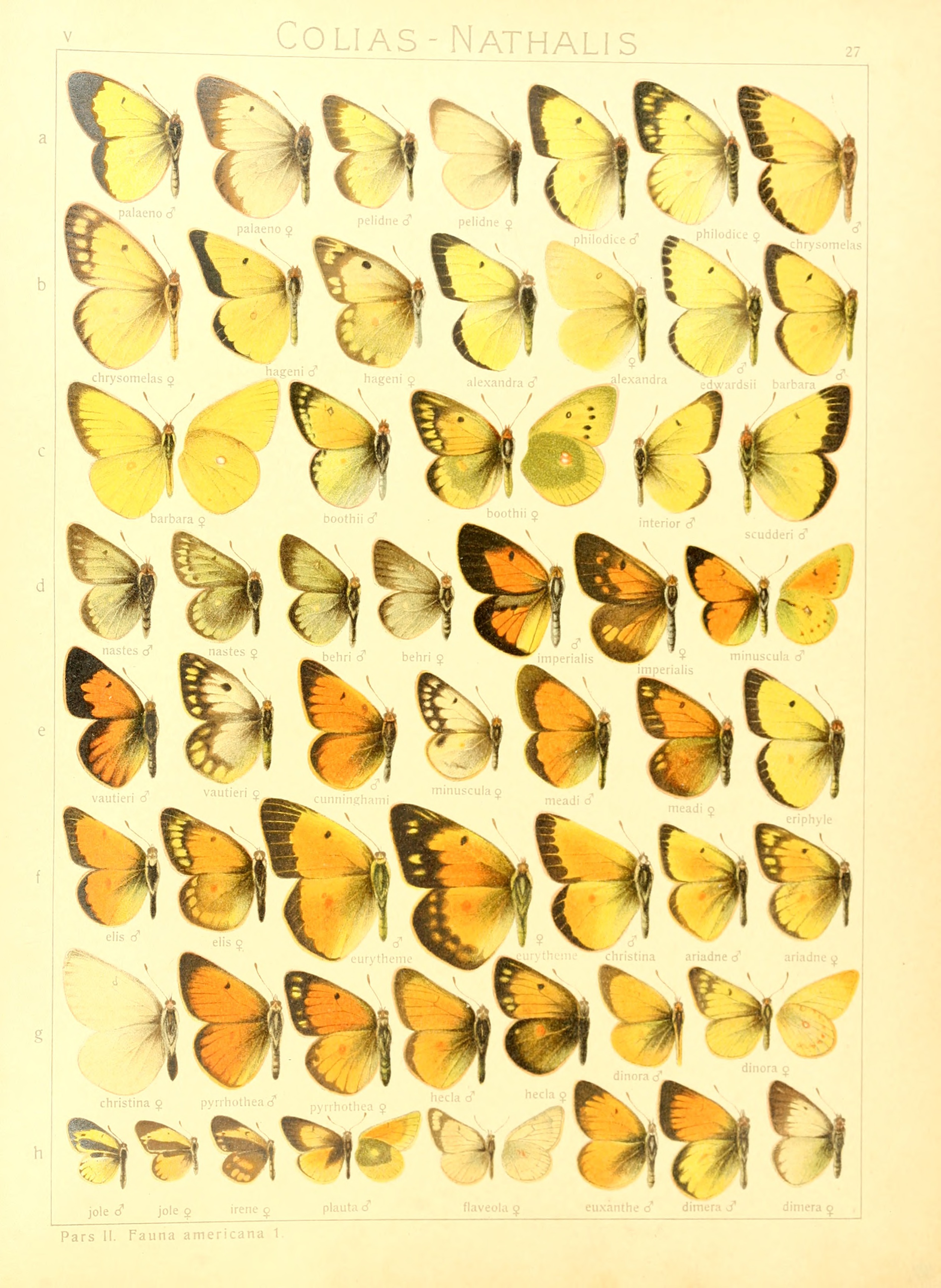

Conservation status
- Secure (NatureServe)

Scientific classification
- Kingdom: Animalia
- Phylum: Arthropoda
- Clade: Pancrustacea
- Class: Insecta
- Order: Lepidoptera
- Family: Pieridae
- Genus: Colias
- Species: C. pelidne

Binomial name
- Colias pelidne Boisduval & Le Conte, [1829]

Synonyms
- Eurymus pelidne Dyar, 1903

= Colias pelidne =

Species of butterfly

Colias pelidne, the pelidne sulphur or blueberry sulphur, is a butterfly in the family Pieridae found in North America. Its range includes British Columbia across Canada as far east as Newfoundland and south to Idaho, Montana, and Wyoming.

Flight period is from late June until early August. It inhabits tundra and mountains at altitudes of 6,000–11,500 feet (1,800–3,500 m).

Wingspan is from 33 to 44 mm.

Larvae feed on Vaccinium spp. and Gaultheria humifusa. Adults feed on flower nectar.

== Subspecies ==
Listed alphabetically.

- C. c. pelidne
- C. p. skinneri Barnes, 1897
- C. p. minisni Bean, 1895 forma? accepted as a species by Josef Grieshuber & Gerardo Lamas
