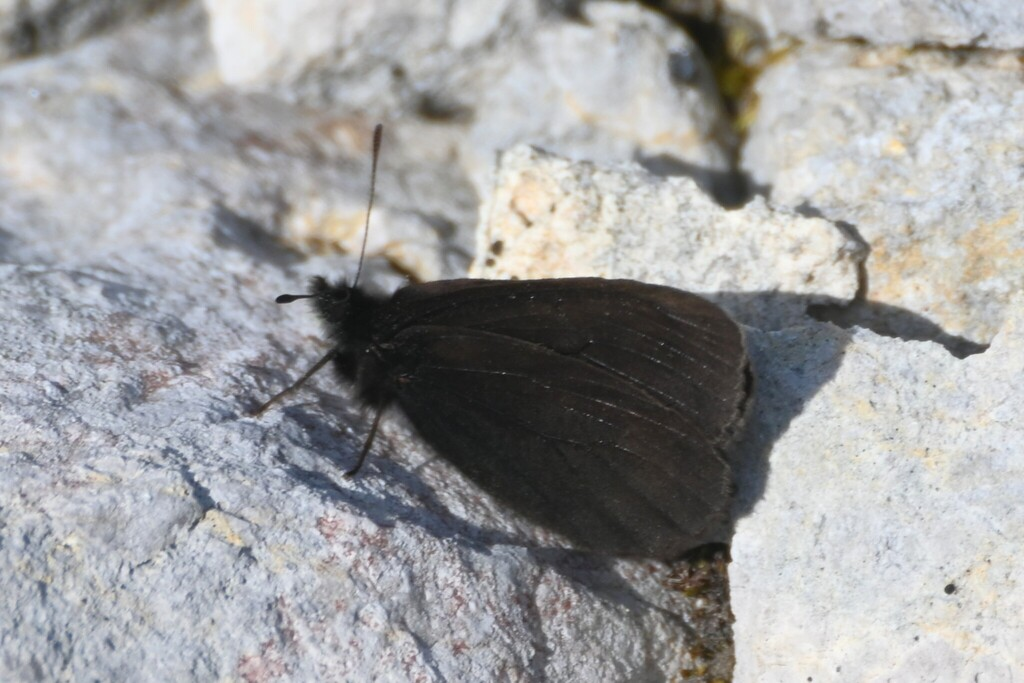

Scientific classification
- Kingdom: Animalia
- Phylum: Arthropoda
- Class: Insecta
- Order: Lepidoptera
- Family: Nymphalidae
- Genus: Erebia
- Species: E. mackinleyensis

Binomial name
- Erebia mackinleyensis Gunder, 1932

Synonyms
- Erebia magdalena mackinleyensis

= Erebia mackinleyensis =

Mt. McKinley alpine

Species of butterfly

Erebia mackinleyensis, the Mt. McKinley alpine, is a butterfly in the subfamily Satyrinae of the family Nymphalidae. It is found from eastern Siberia through Alaska and Yukon, just reaching into the Northwest Territories in the Richardson Mountains and into British Columbia at Stone Mountain Provincial Park.

The wingspan is 41–53 mm. Adults are on the wing in late June and July. Its habitats include alpine scree and boulder fields.

== Similar species ==
- Magdalena alpine (E. magdalena)
