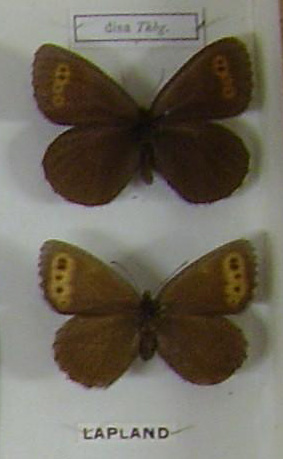
- From the Langham collection at the Ulster Museum

Scientific classification
- Kingdom: Animalia
- Phylum: Arthropoda
- Class: Insecta
- Order: Lepidoptera
- Family: Nymphalidae
- Genus: Erebia
- Species: E. disa

Binomial name
- Erebia disa (Thunberg, 1791)

= Arctic ringlet =

Species of butterfly

The Arctic ringlet or Disa alpine (Erebia disa) is a member of the subfamily Satyrinae of family Nymphalidae. It is associated with wet muskeg and bogs in subarctic and Arctic climates, and is often found near the tree-line. The larva overwinters twice before undergoing metamorphosis into an adult. It is found in Arctic Europe, Arctic European Russia (Kanin Peninsula), Sajan, Irkutsk, Yakutsk, Yablonoi and Arctic North America.

== Description ==
The upperside of the wings are dark brown with a fine black and white hashed line along the hind margins. The forewing has a red or orange strip fairly near the edge on which are four black blotches with white-centred eyespots. The hindwing is plain brown. The underside of the forewing is similar to the upperside while the underside of the hindwing is greyish brown with a broad dark brown lateral band and a hashed black and white margin. The wingspan is 40 to 50 mm (1.6 to 2.0 in). Species with which this butterfly could be confused include the Lapland ringlet (Erebia embla) and the Arran brown (Erebia ligea), but these both have white markings on the undersides of their hindwings.

== Distribution and habitat ==
The Arctic ringlet has a Holarctic distribution. It is found in Arctic Europe, Arctic European Russia (Kanin Peninsula), Sajan, Irkutsk, Yakutsk, Yablonoi and Arctic North America. Its typical habitat is bogs and damp forests.

== Life cycle ==
The food plants of the larvae are various species of grasses (Poaceae), cottongrasses (Eriophorum) and sedges (Carex). The larva overwinters twice as a caterpillar and the adult generally flies in July.
