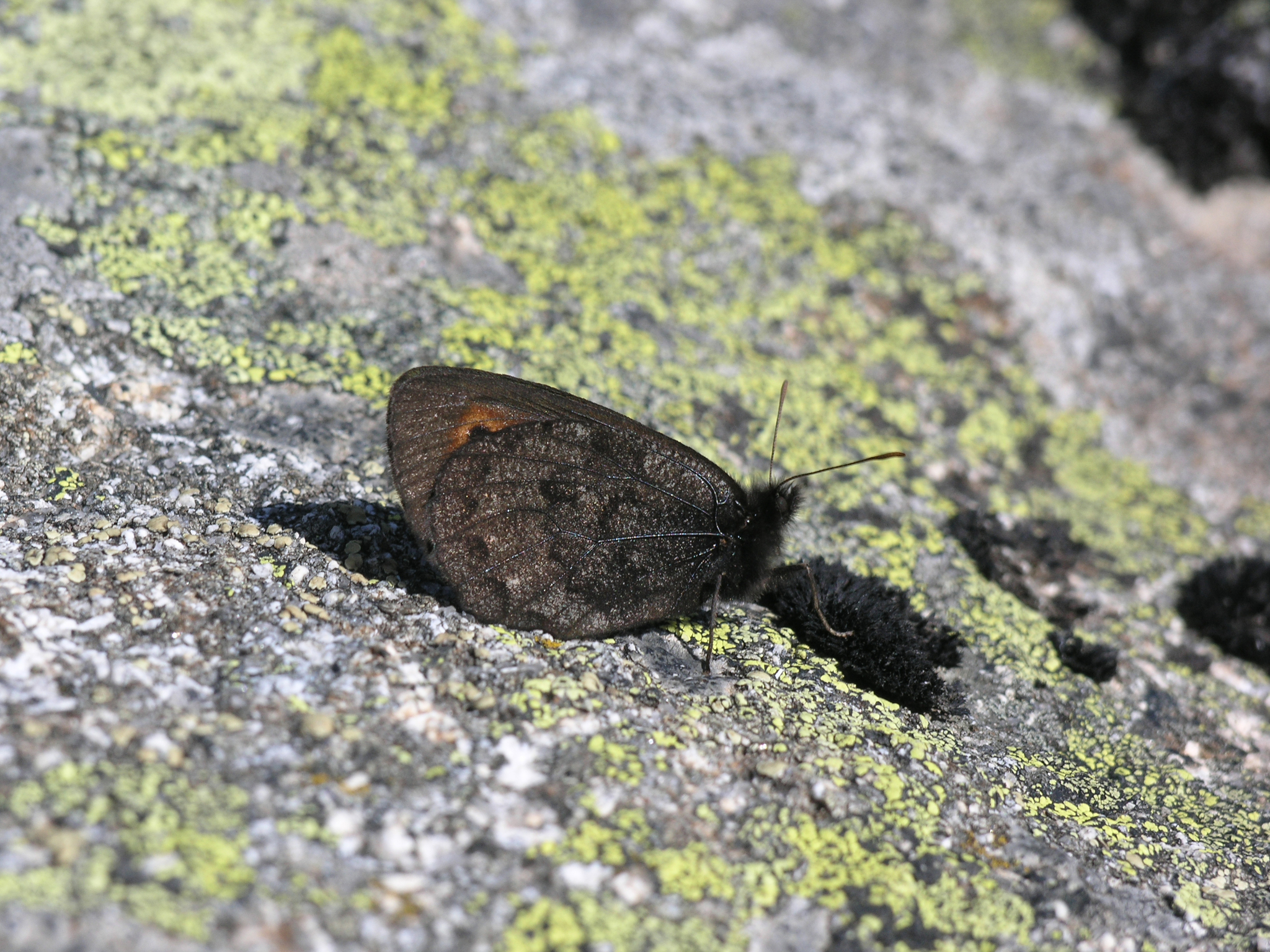
- Erebia rossii ero

Scientific classification
- Kingdom: Animalia
- Phylum: Arthropoda
- Class: Insecta
- Order: Lepidoptera
- Family: Nymphalidae
- Genus: Erebia
- Species: E. rossii

Binomial name
- Erebia rossii Curtis, 1835

Synonyms
- Erebia rossii ab. pallida Goltz, 1930; Erebia rossii ab. nigra Goltz, 1930; Erebia rossii var. erda Sheljuzhko, 1924; Erebia rossii var. ero Bremer, 1861; Erebia rossii var. dzhelindae Sheljuzhko, 1925; Erebia rossii var. polyopis Sheljuzhko, 1919

= Erebia rossii =

Ross's alpine

Species of butterfly

Erebia rossii, the Arctic alpine or Ross's alpine, is a member of the subfamily Satyrinae of the family Nymphalidae. It is found in Arctic North America and northern Eurasia.

== Description ==
The wingspan is 31–44 mm. The dorsal wings are blackish brown. The forewing in the male has two black eyespots with white pupils sometimes surrounded by one or two orange rings. The male's hindwing has no spots or a partial row of very small spots. The female has two large eyespots and may have smaller spots on both wings. The ventral hindwings have greyish median bands with jagged borders.

== Subspecies ==
Listed alphabetically:

- E. r. erda Sheljuzhko, 1924 (Sajan mountains)
- E. r. ero Bremer, 1861 (eastern Siberia, Dzhugdzhur Mountains)
- E. r. gabrieli dos Passos, 1949 (Alaska)
- E. r. kuskoquima Holland, 1931 (Kuskoquim Valley)
- E. r. ornata Leussler, 1935 (Manitoba)
- E. r. subarctica Korshunov, 1996 (mountains of Yakutia and Chukotka)

== Life cycle ==
The food plants of the larvae are various grasses, including Carex species.
