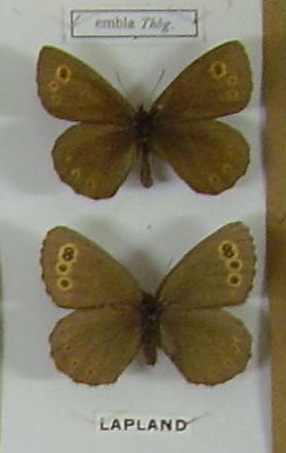
- From the Langham collection at the Ulster Museum

Scientific classification
- Kingdom: Animalia
- Phylum: Arthropoda
- Clade: Pancrustacea
- Class: Insecta
- Order: Lepidoptera
- Family: Nymphalidae
- Genus: Erebia
- Species: E. embla

Binomial name
- Erebia embla (Becklin, 1791) Becklin, Petrus Ericus in Carl Peter Thunberg

= Lapland ringlet =

Species of butterfly

The Lapland ringlet (Erebia embla) is a member of the subfamily Satyrinae of the family Nymphalidae. It is restricted to sunny patches in very damp spruce and pine forests and forested unmanaged peatlands (and sometimes moors). The larva feeds on various grasses and related plants (such as Carex) and winters twice. A dry period in the habitat will result in the decline of the species.

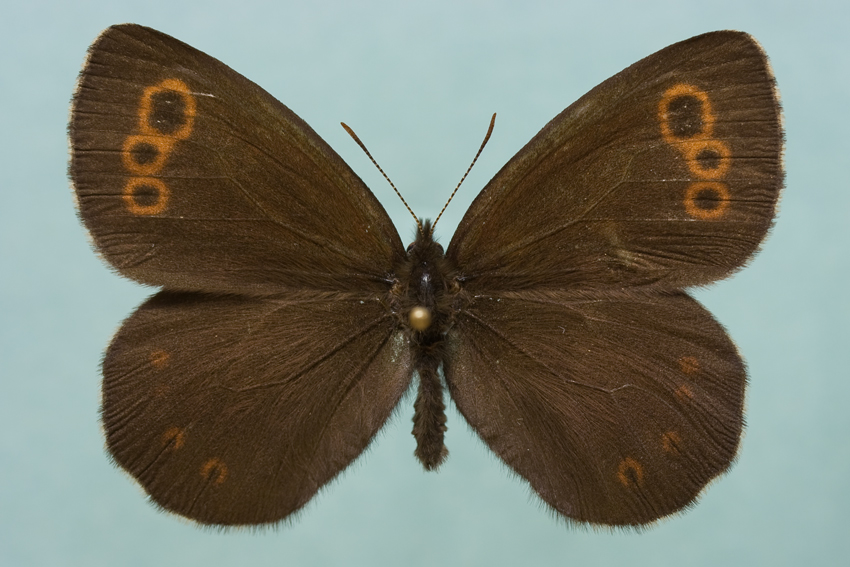

== Description in Seitz ==
E. embla Thunb. (= dioxippe Hbn.) (37 h). Dark grey- brown above, the hindwing being feebly dentate and the fringes chequered brown and grey. The forewing bears 3 black eye-spots in brown yellow rings, the anterior one being largest and having mostly 2 white pupils, while the 2 posterior ones are shifted distad and are small, black, and without pupils. There are on the hindwing mostly 3—4 black ocelli which are bordered with brown -yellow, have no pupils and are sometimes absent. The forewing beneath somewhat darker than above, the apex and part of the distal margin being dusted with ashy grey The ocelli are not brown -yellow, but light with ochre -yellow ring, these more prominent than above. The hindwing beneath densely dusted with white-grey, bearing a more or less prominent, brown, distally somewhat dentate, median band, at the outside of which there is sometimes a larger, somewhat diffuse, grey costal spot and usually a small white central one. Before the distal margin there are some black dots, which are here and there narrowly edged with yellow. In Scandinavia, North Russia and Siberia. — ab. succulenta Alph. is lighter above than the nymotypical embla, with more numerous and larger black eyespots, which moreover are broadly ringed with brown -yellow. In Kamtchatka and Mongolia; in Europe occasional specimen among the nymotypical form of embla. — unicolor Spuler is the form occurring in northern Fennoscandia; it is uniformly black-brown, the ocelli of the forewing being absent except the upper 2, which are faintly edged with red or not at all. — Nothing is known of the larva. The form embla flies on the northern moors; succulenta according to Elwes in the woods, apparently nowhere in abundance.

There are three subspecies:

- E. e. embla Becklin, 1791 – Fennoscandia to East Siberia
- E. e. dissimulata Warren, 1931 – Altai and Sayan Mountains
- E. e. succulenta Alphéraky, 1897 – Russian Far East
