= List of butterflies of Finland =

The butterflies of Finland include all species of butterflies (Papilionoidea) (including skippers, which were formerly considered a separate superfamily Hesperioidea but nowadays are included in Papilionoidea) which have been recorded in Finland. The local butterfly fauna includes 121 species of butterflies, 10 of which are skippers. However, some species have been reported only once.

As of 2010, the butterfly fauna of Finland included two species classified as critically endangered (CR), 12 species as endangered (EN) and 10 species as vulnerable (VU). Out of all 26 lepidopteran species which are protected by law under the Nature Conservation Decree, 18 species appear on this list.

== Butterflies (Papilionoidea) by family ==
=== Pieridae ===
- Coliadinae
  - Colias crocea, dark clouded yellow
  - Colias hecla sulitelma, northern clouded yellow
  - Colias hyale, pale clouded yellow
  - Colias palaeno, moorland clouded yellow
  - Colias tyche werdandi, pale Arctic clouded yellow
  - Gonepteryx rhamni, common brimstone
- Dismorphiinae
  - Leptidea juvernica
  - Leptidea sinapis, wood white
- Pierinae
  - Anthocharis cardamines, orange tip
  - Aporia crataegi, black-veined white
  - Euchloe ausonia, eastern dappled white
  - Pieris brassicae, large white
  - Pieris napi, green-veined white
  - Pieris rapae, small white
  - Pontia callidice, lofty Bath white
  - Pontia chloridice, lesser Bath white
  - Pontia daplidice, Bath white

=== Papilionidae ===
- Papilioninae
  - Iphiclides podalirius, scarce swallowtail
  - Papilio machaon, Old World swallowtail
- Parnassiinae
  - Parnassius apollo, Apollo - protected by law
  - Parnassius mnemosyne, clouded Apollo - protected by law

=== Lycaenidae ===
- Lycaeninae
  - Lycaena dispar, large copper - protected by law
  - Lycaena helle, violet copper - protected by law
  - Lycaena hippothoe, purple-edged copper
  - Lycaena phlaeas, small copper
  - Lycaena tityrus, sooty copper
  - Lycaena virgaureae, scarce copper
- Polyommatinae
  - Agriades glandon aquilo, Arctic blue - protected by law
  - Agriades optilete, cranberry blue
  - Aricia artaxerxes, northern brown argus
  - Aricia nicias, silvery argus
  - Celastrina argiolus, holly blue
  - Cupido alcetas, Provençal short-tailed blue
  - Cupido argiades, short-tailed blue
  - Cupido minimus, small blue
  - Cyaniris semiargus, Mazarine blue
  - Eumedonia eumedon, geranium argus
  - Glaucopsyche alexis, green-underside blue
  - Phengaris arion, large blue - protected by law
  - Plebejus argus, silver-studded blue
  - Plebejus idas, northern blue
  - Polyommatus amandus, Amanda's blue
  - Polyommatus icarus, common blue
  - Pseudophilotes vicrama, chequered blue - protected by law
  - Scolitantides orion, chequered blue butterfly - protected by law
- Theclinae
  - Callophrys rubi, green hairstreak
  - Neozephyrus quercus, purple hairstreak
  - Satyrium pruni, black hairstreak
  - Satyrium w-album, white-letter hairstreak
  - Thecla betulae, brown hairstreak

=== Nymphalidae ===
- Apaturinae
  - Apatura ilia, lesser purple emperor
  - Apatura iris, purple emperor
- Heliconiinae
  - Argynnis laodice, Pallas' fritillary
  - Argynnis paphia, silver-washed fritillary
  - Speyeria aglaja, dark green fritillary
  - Fabriciana adippe, high brown fritillary
  - Fabriciana niobe, Niobe fritillary
  - Boloria aquilonaris, cranberry fritillary
  - Boloria chariclea, Arctic fritillary
  - Boloria freija, Freija fritillary
  - Boloria frigga, Frigga fritillary
  - Boloria eunomia, bog fritillary
  - Boloria euphrosyne, pearl-bordered fritillary
  - Boloria improba, dingy fritillary - protected by law
  - Boloria napaea, mountain fritillary
  - Boloria polaris, polaris fritillary
  - Boloria selene, small pearl-bordered fritillary
  - Boloria thore, Thor's fritillary - protected by law south from Kainuu
  - Boloria titania, titania's fritillary - protected by law
  - Brenthis ino, lesser marbled fritillary
  - Issoria lathonia, Queen of Spain fritillary
- Limenitidinae
  - Limenitis camilla, white admiral
  - Limenitis populi, poplar admiral
- Nymphalinae
  - Aglais io, European peacock
  - Aglais urticae, small tortoiseshell
  - Araschnia levana, map
  - Euphydryas aurinia, marsh fritillary - protected by law
  - Euphydryas intermedia
  - Euphydryas iduna, Lapland fritillary
  - Euphydryas maturna, scarce fritillary - protected by law
  - Melitaea athalia, heath fritillary
  - Melitaea cinxia, Glanville fritillary
  - Melitaea diamina, false heath fritillary - protected by law
  - Nymphalis antiopa, mourning cloak
  - Nymphalis polychloros, large tortoiseshell
  - Nymphalis vaualbum, Compton tortoiseshell
  - Nymphalis xanthomelas, scarce tortoiseshell
  - Polygonia c-album, comma
  - Vanessa atalanta, red admiral
  - Vanessa cardui, painted lady
- Satyrinae
  - Hipparchia semele, grayling
  - Lopinga achine, woodland brown - protected by law
  - Lasiommata petropolitana, northern wall brown
  - Lasiommata megera, speckled wood
  - Lasiommata maera, large wall
  - Pararge aegeria tircis, speckled wood
  - Hyponephele lycaon, dusky meadow brown
  - Aphantopus hyperantus, ringlet
  - Maniola jurtina, meadow brown
  - Coenonympha glycerion, chestnut heath
  - Coenonympha pamphilus, small heath
  - Coenonympha hero, scarce heath
  - Coenonympha tullia, large heath
  - Erebia euryale euryaloides, large ringlet
  - Erebia disa, Arctic ringlet
  - Erebia pandrose, dewy ringlet
  - Erebia ligea, Arran brown
  - Erebia medusa polaris, woodland ringlet - protected by law
  - Erebia embla, Lapland ringlet
  - Oeneis bore, Arctic grayling
  - Oeneis jutta, Baltic grayling
  - Oeneis norna, nose grayling

=== Hesperiidae (skippers) ===
- Heteropterinae
  - Carterocephalus palaemon, chequered skipper
  - Carterocephalus silvicola, northern chequered skipper
  - Heteropterus morpheus, large chequered skipper
- Hesperiinae
  - Hesperia comma, silver-spotted skipper - northern subspecies protected by law
  - Ochlodes sylvanus, large skipper
  - Thymelicus lineola, Essex skipper
- Pyrginae
  - Pyrgus alveus, large grizzled skipper
  - Pyrgus andromedae, Alpine grizzled skipper
  - Pyrgus centaureae, northern grizzled skipper
  - Pyrgus malvae, grizzled skipper

== See also ==
- List of moths of Finland
