= List of butterflies of Sweden =

This is a list of butterflies in Sweden.

== Papilionidae ==
- Old World swallowtail, Papilio machaon
- Mountain Apollo, Parnassius apollo
- Clouded Apollo, Parnassius mnemosyne

== Pieridae ==
- Black-veined white, Aporia crataegi
- Large white, Pieris brassicae
- Small white, Pieris rapae
- Green-veined white, Pieris napi
- Eastern Bath white, Pontia edusa
- Orange tip, Anthocharis cardamines
- Pale Arctic clouded yellow, Colias nastes
- Moorland clouded yellow, Colias palaeno
- Northern clouded yellow, Colias hecla
- Pale clouded yellow, Colias hyale
- Clouded yellow, Colias crocea
- Brimstone, Gonepteryx rhamni
- Wood white, Leptidea sinapis
- Réal's wood white, Leptidea reali

== Lycaenidae ==
- Brown hairstreak, Thecla betulae
- Purple hairstreak, Neozephyrus quercus
- Ilex hairstreak, Satyrium ilicis
- White-letter hairstreak, Satyrium w-album
- Black hairstreak, Satyrium pruni
- Green hairstreak, Callophrys rubi
- Violet copper, Lycaena helle
- Small copper, Lycaena phlaeas
- Scarce copper, Lycaena virgaureae
- Purple-edged copper, Lycaena hippothoe
- Little blue, Cupido minimus
- Holly blue, Celastrina argiolus
- Green-underside blue, Glaucopsyche alexis
- Alcon blue, Phengaris alcon
- Large blue, Phengaris arion
- Checkered blue, Scolitantides orion
- Silver-studded blue, Plebejus argus
- Idas blue, Plebejus idas
- Reverdin's blue, Plebeius argyrognomon
- Geranium argus, Eumedonia eumedon
- Mountain argus, Aricia artaxerxes
- Silvery argus, Aricia nicias
- Cranberry blue, Agriades optilete
- Alpine blue, Agriades orbitulus
- Glandon blue, Agriades glandon
- Mazarine blue, Cyaniris semiargus
- Amanda's blue, Polyommatus amandus
- Turquoise blue, Polyommatus dorylas
- Common blue, Polyommatus icarus

== Riodinidae ==
- Duke of Burgundy, Hamearis lucina

== Nymphalidae ==
- Purple emperor, Apatura iris
- Poplar admiral, Limenitis populi
- Large tortoiseshell, Nymphalis polychloros
- Camberwell beauty, Nymphalis antiopa
- Red admiral, Vanessa atalanta
- Painted lady, Vanessa cardui
- Peacock butterfly, Aglais io
- Small tortoiseshell, Aglais urticae
- Comma butterfly, Polygonia c-album
- Map butterfly, Araschnia levana
- Silver-washed fritillary, Argynnis paphia
- Pallas's fritillary, Argynnis laodice
- Dark green fritillary, Speyeria aglaja
- High brown fritillary, Fabriciana adippe
- Niobe fritillary, Fabriciana niobe
- Queen of Spain fritillary, Issoria lathonia
- Lesser marbled fritillary, Brenthis ino
- Mountain fritillary, Boloria napaea
- Cranberry fritillary, Boloria aquilonaris
- Bog fritillary, Boloria eunomia
- Pearl-bordered fritillary, Boloria euphrosyne
- Small pearl-bordered fritillary, Boloria selene
- Arctic fritillary, Boloria chariclea
- Frejya's fritillary, Boloria freija
- Polar fritillary, Boloria polaris
- Thor's fritillary, Boloria thore
- Frigga's fritillary, Boloria frigga
- Dusky-winged fritillary, Boloria improba
- Glanville fritillary, Melitaea cinxia
- False heath fritillary, Melitaea diamina
- Heath fritillary, Melitaea athalia
- Assmann's fritillary, Melitaea britomartis
- Scarce fritillary, Euphydryas maturna
- Lappland fritillary, Euphydryas iduna
- Marsh fritillary, Euphydryas aurinia
- Grayling, Hipparchia semele
- Norse grayling, Oeneis norna
- Arctic grayling, Oeneis bore
- Baltic grayling, Oeneis jutta
- Arran brown, Erebia ligea
- Lapland ringlet, Erebia embla
- Arctic ringlet, Erebia disa
- Dewy ringlet, Erebia pandrose
- Meadow brown, Maniola jurtina
- Ringlet, Aphantopus hyperantus
- Large heath, Coenonympha tullia
- Small heath, Coenonympha pamphilus
- Pearly heath, Coenonympha arcania
- Scarce heath, Coenonympha hero
- Speckled wood, Pararge aegeria
- Wall brown, Lasiommata megera
- Large wall brown, Lasiommata maera
- Northern wall brown, Lasiommata petropolitana
- Woodland brown, Lopinga achine

== Hesperiidae ==
- Grizzled skipper, Pyrgus malvae
- Large grizzled skipper, Pyrgus alveus
- Oberthür's grizzled skipper, Pyrgus armoricanus
- Alpine grizzled skipper, Pyrgus andromedae
- Northern grizzled skipper, Pyrgus centaureae
- Dingy skipper, Erynnis tages
- Large checkered skipper, Heteropterus morpheus
- Checkered skipper, Carterocephalus palaemon
- Northern checkered skipper, Carterocephalus silvicola
- Essex skipper, Thymelicus lineola
- Silver-spotted skipper, Hesperia comma
- Large skipper, Ochlodes sylvanus

== See also ==
- List of moths of Sweden
