= Sergei Nikolaev (linguist) =

Russian linguist

Sergei Lvovich Nikolaev
- Born: December 25, 1954 (age 71); Novosibirsk
- Education: Tver State University
- Scientific career
- Fields: Linguistics, historical linguistics, accentology
- Workplaces: Institute for Slavic Studies of the Russian Academy of Sciences
- Academic advisors: Vladimir Dybo

Sergei Lvovich Nikolaev (Russian: Серге́й Льво́вич Никола́ев; born 25 December 1954) is a Russian linguist, specialist in comparative historical linguistics, Slavic accentology and dialectology. He is the author of a number of books and articles on Indo-European studies, accentology, and Slavic dialectology. Nikolaev is a Doctor of Sciences in Philological Sciences.

He is also a major figure in the Moscow School of Comparative Linguistics.

== Biography ==
Nikolaev graduated from the philological faculty of Tver State University and Moscow State University.

Since 1986, he has worked at the Institute for Slavic and Balkan studies of the Russian Academy of Sciences. Since 1987, he has been the head of regular dialectological expeditions in the area of East Slavic subdialects.

In 1992, he received a doctoral degree with a dissertation comprising the totality of his works, and now heads the group of Slavic glottogenesis.

== Contribution to linguistics ==
Sergei Nikolaev is a specialist in Slavic and Indo-European comparative historical linguistics. The scope of studies covers Slavic, Balto-Slavic and Indo-European historical accentology, comparative grammar of North Caucasian languages, hypothetical Sino-Caucasian macro-family of languages, hypothetical Amerindian macro-family.

Nikolaev connects the linguogeography and historical dialectology of Slavic languages with the problems of ethnogenesis of the Slavs. In East Slavic dialectology, he established a number of the oldest (Late Proto-Slavic) dialect isoglosses. Reconstruction of the placement of these isoglossae on the territory of the oldest Slavic settlement showed their connection with the archaeological areas of large Proto-Slavic tribal associations.

As a result of the field studies of the East Slavic dialects, the Institute has collected an East Slavic phonetic library and an archive of dialect recordings.

Nikolaev is the author of the etymological dictionary of North Caucasian languages (together with Sergei Starostin), one of the authors of the series "Fundamentals of Slavic accentology", a participant in the international Internet projects "Evolution of language" and "tower of Babel" (etymological databases; he created a comparative database on Indo-European languages and databases on Finno-Ugric and Amerindian languages).

For more than 20 years, Nikolaev has been the leader and organizer of complex linguistic expeditions to the East Slavic dialects (the Carpathians, the Russian Northwest, Belarus, Polesie) and to the archaic Old Shtokavian dialects of the Serbo-Croatian language (Slavonia, together with Croatian colleagues), author of special field programs on East Slavic historical dialectology.

Nikolaev was nominated three times as a Corresponding Member of the Russian Academy of Sciences. In 2004, he was awarded the Sigma Xi, The Scientific Research Society (Montreal, Canada).

In 2014, after placing the accents, Nikolaev confirmed (with a significant transformation and many clarifications) Andrei Chernov's idea of syncretic polyrhythm in The Tale of Igor's Campaign.

== Contribution to the study of butterflies ==
As a boy, he first discovered in 1968 a significant population of Polyommatus damone in the Altai. In 1970, in Tuva, he caught two new taxa of the Satyrinae genus Oeneis (described by Yuri Korshunov as Oeneis judini and O. shurmaki). During 1980–1985, he collected a large collection of Lepidoptera in the Tver Oblast, now located in the Siberian Zoological Museum, and described the presumably new taxon Erebia polonina. Together with Yuri Korshunov, he wrote articles on North Asian Oeneis and Erebia (the last article includes E. polonina).
