= Oeneis tanana =

Conservation status
- Imperiled (NatureServe)

Scientific classification
- Kingdom: Animalia
- Phylum: Arthropoda
- Class: Insecta
- Order: Lepidoptera
- Family: Nymphalidae
- Subtribe: Satyrina
- Genus: Oeneis
- Species group: Oeneis (bore)
- Species: O. tanana

Binomial name
- Oeneis tanana A. Warren & Nakahara 2016

Species of butterfly

Oeneis tanana, the Tanana Arctic, is a species of butterfly, a member of the Satyrinae. It occurs in Alaska, and is believed to be the only endemic species of butterfly in the state. It is speculated to be a hybrid species of Oeneis bore and O. chryxus. The species is threatened due to habitat loss.

== Range and habitat ==
It occurs only in the Tanana River valley area of Alaska. This valley, or part of it, was a glacial refugium during the last ice age. O. tanana inhabits clearings in boreal spruce forests.

=== Larval foods ===
Speculated to be grasses and sedges.

=== Adult foods ===
Unknown, but related species sip nectar.

== Life cycle ==
Adults are on the wing between mid May and early July, but mostly mid June. It takes two seasonal cycles for the caterpillars to completely develop. Adults are only found during odd numbered years.
