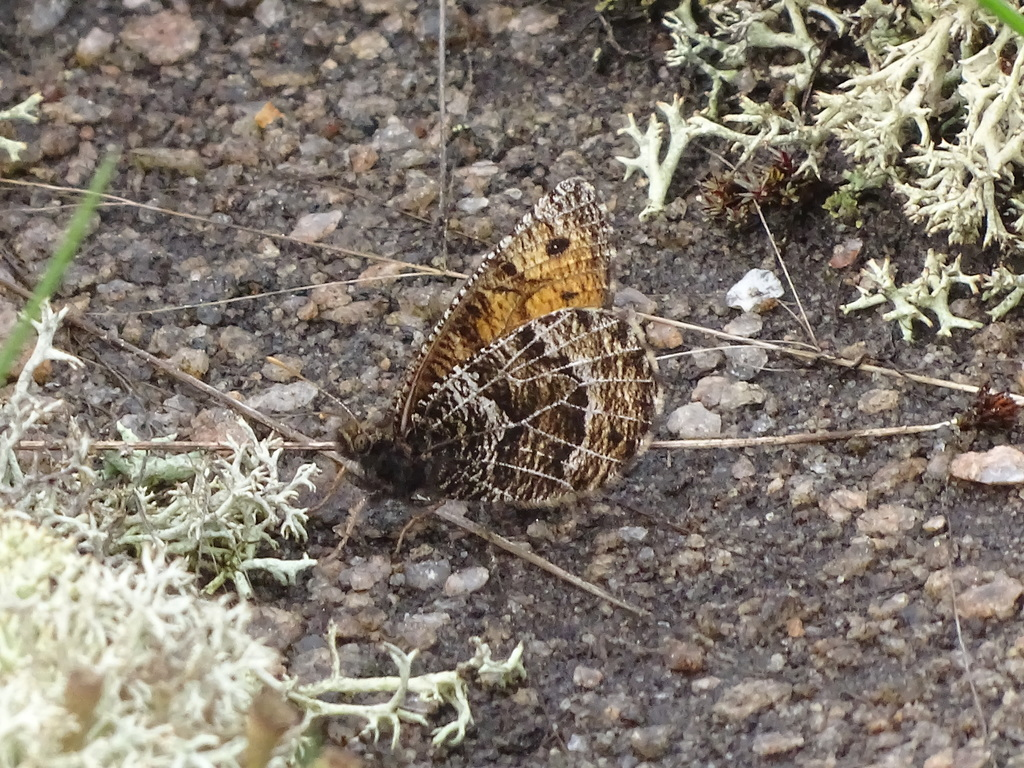

Conservation status
- Secure (NatureServe)

Scientific classification
- Kingdom: Animalia
- Phylum: Arthropoda
- Clade: Pancrustacea
- Class: Insecta
- Order: Lepidoptera
- Family: Nymphalidae
- Genus: Oeneis
- Species group: Oeneis (bore)
- Species: O. chryxus

Binomial name
- Oeneis chryxus (Doubleday, [1849])

Subspecies
- See text

= Oeneis chryxus =

Species of butterfly

Oeneis chryxus, the chryxus Arctic or brown Arctic, is a butterfly of subfamily Satyrinae found in the far northwest regions of Canada and the United States. The brown Arctic has highly variable colorings, which tend toward light yellow to orange brown wings that help camouflage it against its mountainous rocky habitat. The larvae feed on local grasses and take two years to develop. This longer development period results in flights of adult brown Arctics only once every two years. The butterflies feed on nectar from various plants as their primary food source.

The males exhibit lek territoriality by defending desired territories from other males by challenging them to sparring flights for access to females. The females exhibit hilltopping behavior for finding mates, flying from meadows to higher elevated ridges where they are more likely to find males.

Climate change, as well as human activity, has been threatening the habitats of this species.

== Range and habitat ==
The range of the brown Arctic has been found to spread across the far northwest of North America, including West Alberta, South British Columbia, Idaho, Montana, Wyoming, Colorado, Utah, Nevada, New Mexico, Alaska, and California.

Typically, the brown Arctic butterfly seems to prefer mountainous sparsely vegetated environments that are characterized by short summers. They are often found in prairies and steppes, but may drift to mountaintops and the edges of forests. It has been conjectured that they prefer habitats with places fit for perching, like fallen trees, or areas that shelter from harsh winds, such as gulches. They have been observed to be less attracted to sites with more than 50% to 60% plant cover. Males are more likely to be found on elevated ridge tops, usually favoring the highest sites of the ridges, whereas females tend to stay in meadows.

== Description ==
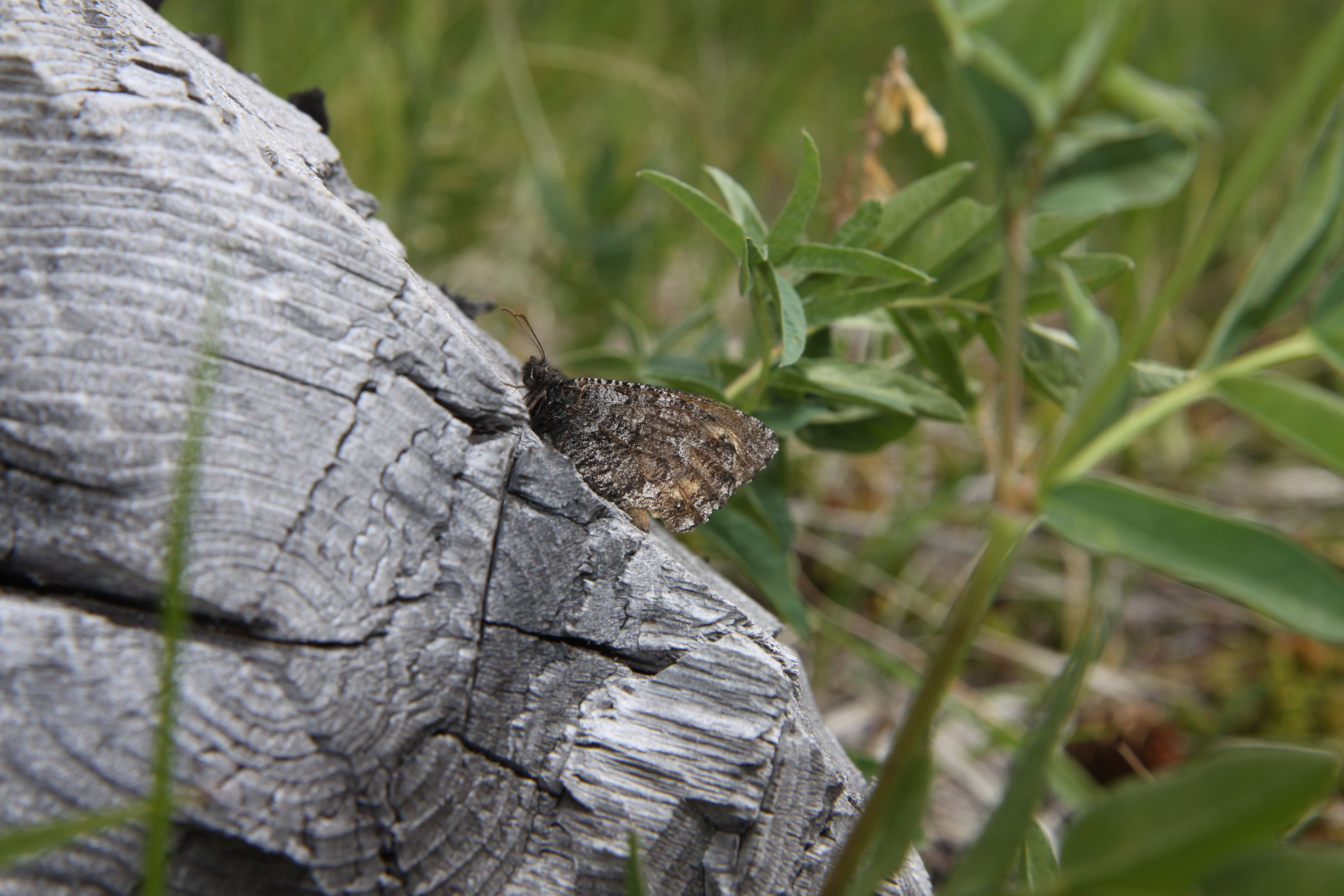
adult

The upperside of the brown Arctic butterfly's wings is typically cream to orange brown, with the edges and bases of the wings a darker brown. The underside of the hindwings shows coarse striation of dark brown and light grey, with a broad dark poorly defined median band and veins of light grey. The upperside of the forewing displays two to four black eyespots near the outer margin, while the upperside of the hindwing has zero to two. These are repeated on the underside of the wings. The wingspan can range from 39 to 54 mm.

Male adults can be distinguished from females by their dark discal patch on the forewing. Females are also observed to have rounder wings than males, while males have more pointed forewings.

== Life cycle ==
=== Egg ===
The adult female brown Arctics typically lay their eggs on dead twigs and leaves on the ground. Their egg-laying sites are fairly ubiquitous as they are not very discriminating. They have also been known to lay their eggs on grasses and sedges, or on the lower branches of Ponderosa Pine with sedges growing below. They typically lay between 30 and 100 eggs, which hatch in about 15 days. Brown Arctic eggs are generally white and barrel-shaped, and ornamented with 19 vertical ribs.

=== Caterpillar ===
The brown Arctic has five larval instars, beginning with the pinkish brown first instar displaying darker magenta longitudinal lines and paired thin pink protrusions on its posterior. The larvae becomes darker as it matures, and the final larval instar has a bifurcated head and ranges in color from pink to light brown, with a black dorsal and dorsolateral stripe, short paired protrusions on its posterior, and small erratic setae over its entire body and head. The larvae feed on grasses, including Festuca idahoensis in Washington, Carex in Colorado, and Danthonia spicata, Oryzopsis pungens, and Phalaris arundinacea in eastern Canada. They remain in the larval stage for about two years, hibernating as the first or second larval instar during the first winter, and as the third, fourth, or fifth instar during the second winter.

=== Pupae ===
Larvae generally pupate in duff or soil, or adhered to twigs, bark, or vegetation. The pupae of this species are dark yellow brown with heavy black coloring on the head and wing cases, and light brown with small black spots on the thorax and abdomen.

=== Adult ===
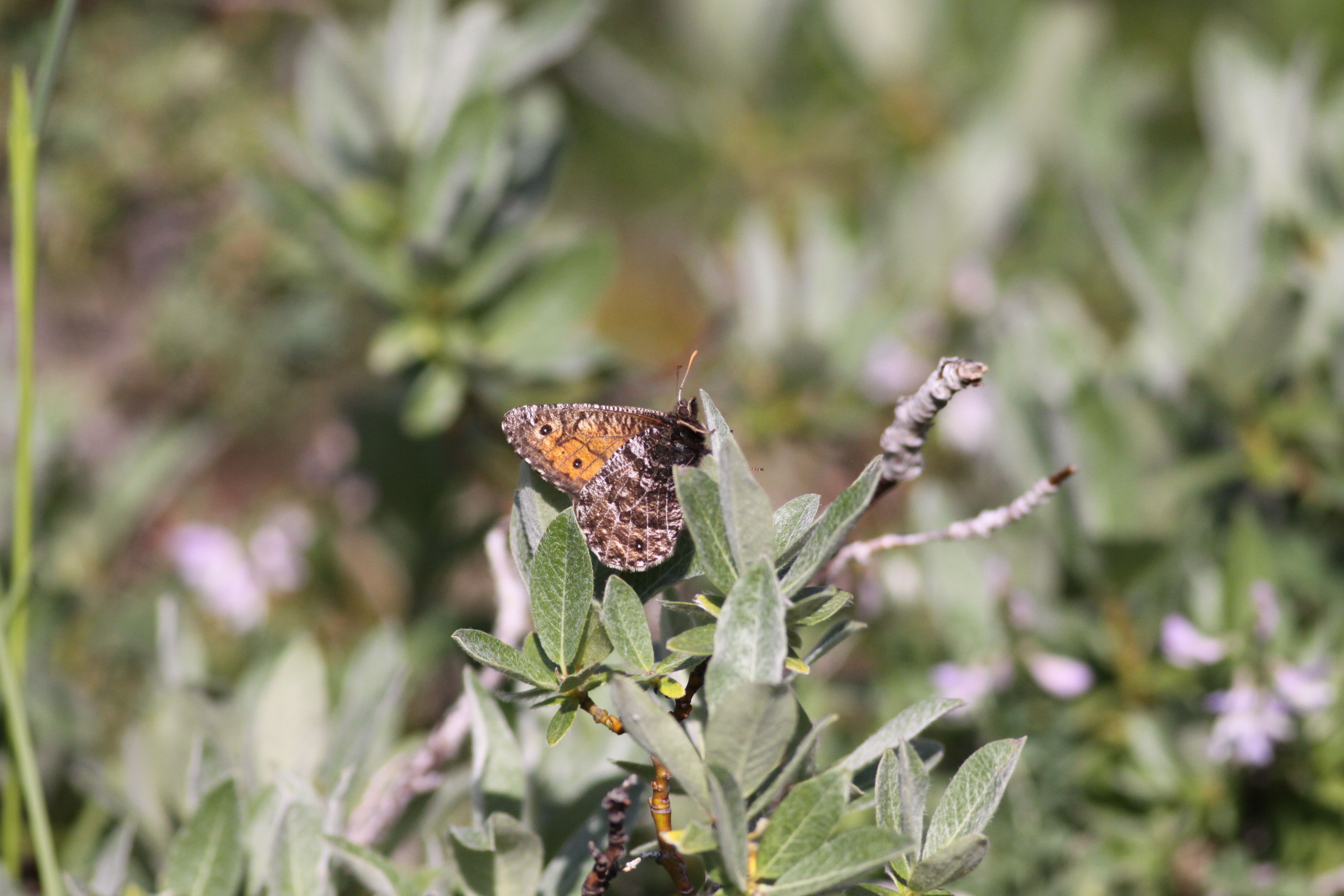
adult

The adult brown Arctics feed on mud and nectar from a variety of flowers, including pearly everlasting, paintbrush, showy phlox, geranium, and puccoon. Due to the timeline of two years for the development of the brown Arctic eggs, the flight of the species is biennial in many regions. Flights in two subsequent years represent two temporally separated populations of adult butterflies. For example, in Vancouver, flights during the even and odd numbered years are two different generations of butterflies.

== Mating ==
=== Courtship ===
A female brown Arctic flies up to higher ridges and mountains, in a phenomenon known as hilltopping, for mating. This mating mechanism occurs because males can be found at a frequency about 15 to 30 times higher on ridges than in meadows, so females can reduce their energy output and exposure to predation while searching for mates. Because the ridges provide no other benefit such as food, shelter, avoidance of predators, or thermoregulation, males inhabit these areas specifically for mating, as the elevations are easily located by females. The highly contested territories also do not include areas for oviposition, food, or other resources to offer the female. Thus, the female similarly comes to these territories for only mating, with no other visible benefit from the male. "Drifters", or males who were unable to acquire a territory, enjoy fewer copulations than those who have territories.

The darker patch on the dorsal forewing that males of this species possess are scent scales that emit pheromones used in courtship. Males that encounter a female chase her into an upward spiral, and, upon distinguishing the sex of its partner, turns the approach into a courtship flight for the female rather than the sparring it would do for a male. The male spirals around the female more closely than he would during a male-male spiral, while the female does little spiralling. The virgin female may alert the males of her receptiveness to mating by performing a solicitation, or a Lolita flight. If the female lands on the ground, the male attempts to mate. Females are likely to return to the more protected sites like meadows upon mating for oviposition. Virgin females are scarce in this species, as most females mate only once in their lifetime.

=== Lekking/territoriality ===
The territoriality of male brown Arctic butterflies resembles lekking behavior, in which the majority of the desired territories are highly condensed in specific areas. The males congregate in these specific areas and defend their desired territories from other males. The occupancy of the territories is highly consistent, with males defending their territories successfully for as many as 11 consecutive days. Males are highly territorial, giving chase to anything in the air near their perch site, including non-competitors like moths, birds, falling leaves, and even pebbles tossed near them. Due to the lack of specificity, the chase is most likely due to a fixed action pattern to pursue upon movement via an innate releasing mechanism. It is then switched to “sparring” by intruder males, “courtship” by females, and “break off” by non-conspecifics. Butterflies of a different species are distinguished by wing beat frequency. Male size is generally not correlated with the acquisition of the best territories in this species. But rather, the size of spots on the wings has been shown to be a greater factor in gaining these territories. Female brown arctics are not observed to be territorial, as they do not initiate chases or defend territories.

=== Aggression ===
Male brown Arctics will chase any other butterfly that approaches them. They move in a direct path away from the perch site and turn into spiraling upward flights that can last more than 45 seconds with the intruder. The two or sometimes three individuals involved move in tight circles around each other. The upward spirals can be observed to escalate up to 30 meters above ground, and end with one or both of the butterflies diving sharply toward the ground. Successful defense of the perch site will allow the original butterfly to return to the perch site, while intruders leave quickly.

== Protective coloring and behavior ==
The brown Arctic butterfly is often described as cryptically colored. Their striated light brown undersides have evolved due to predator pressure. Due to this, the butterflies evolved to camouflage themselves against their background in the Arctic-alpine habitat, including against rock, lichen, and bark. Brown Arctics in hotter, drier regions are generally lighter in color than populations in wetter, cloudier regions. This is most likely because differential lightings leading to different optimal camouflages. The butterfly has been observed to lean sideways to minimize its shadow to be better camouflaged against lichen covered rocks.

== Physiology ==
=== Flight ===
The peak of the adult flight period of brown Arctics has been observed to be June to July, but ranging from late May to late August. Males rarely take flight spontaneously, only showing activity due to approach of another organism. Males are more likely to display circling flight patterns and prefer to return to the perch site, rarely abandoning their perch to escape into vegetation when disturbed. Females tend to have straighter flight paths with less undulation than males, with a slower wing-beat, only becoming more unpredictable when attempting escape.

== Conservation ==
The brown Arctic butterfly is considered sensitive to climate change. It is a Regional Forest Sensitive Species in the Washburn District of the Chequamegon-Nicolet National Forest, as well State-listed as a Special Concern species in Wisconsin. Continued worsening of climate change is likely to negatively impact the habitats of the brown Arctic. The increase in temperature specifically has the potential to eliminate many alpine habitats in the United States. Paving of roads, as well as other human development, including lodges, parking lots, and picnic grounds, has also led to deterioration of habitats.

== Subspecies ==
Listed alphabetically:

- Oeneis chryxus altacordillera Scott, 2006
- Oeneis chryxus calais (Scudder, 1865)
- Oeneis chryxus caryi Dyar, 1904
- Oeneis chryxus chryxus
- Oeneis chryxus ivallda Mead, 1878
- Oeneis chryxus socorro Holland, 2010
- Oeneis chryxus strigulosa McDunnough, 1934
- Oeneis chryxus valerata Burdick, 1958

=== Synonyms ===
- Oeneis chryxus stanislaus Hovanitz, 1937- synonym of O. c. ivallda Mead, 1878

== Similar species ==
- Great Arctic (O. nevadensis)
- Macoun's Arctic (O. macounii)
- Uhler's Arctic (O. uhleri)
- Alberta Arctic (O. alberta)
- Sentinel Arctic (O. alpina)
