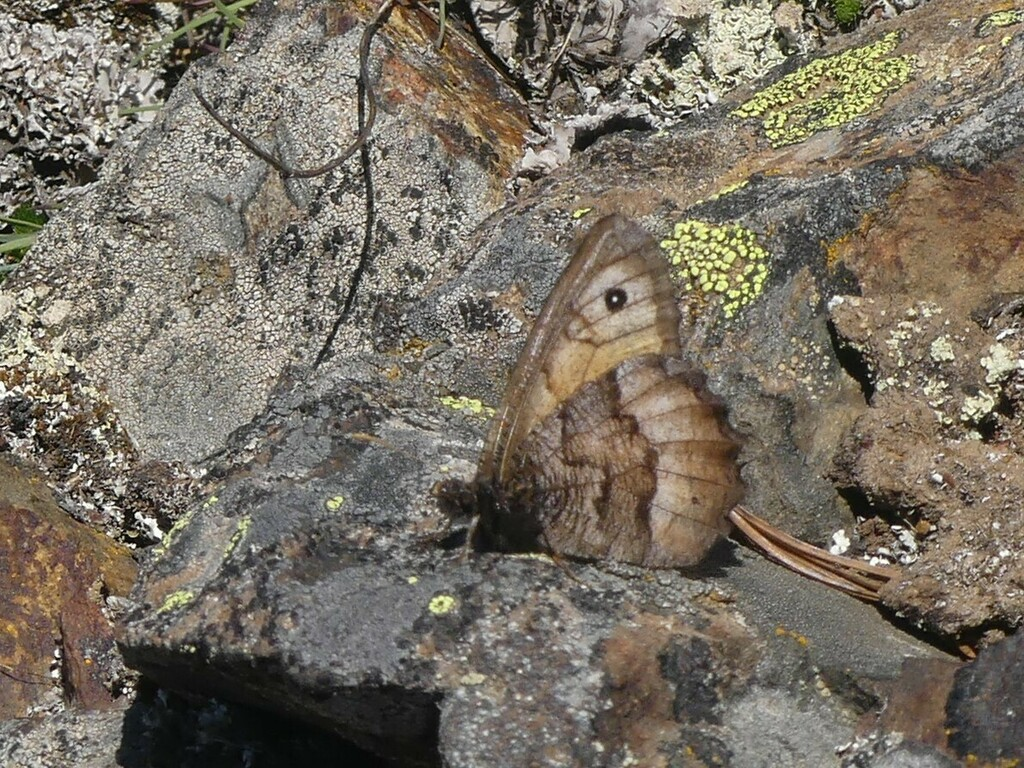

Scientific classification
- Domain: Eukaryota
- Kingdom: Animalia
- Phylum: Arthropoda
- Class: Insecta
- Order: Lepidoptera
- Family: Nymphalidae
- Genus: Oeneis
- Species group: Oeneis (bore)
- Species: O. macounii

Binomial name
- Oeneis macounii (W.H. Edwards, 1885)

Synonyms
- Chionabas macounii W.H. Edwards, 1885

= Oeneis macounii =

Species of butterfly

Oeneis macounii, the Canada Arctic or Macoun's Arctic, is a butterfly of subfamily Satyrinae that occurs in North America.

== Description ==
The wingspan is 46 to 65 mm.

== Similar species ==
- Great Arctic (O. nevadensis)
- Chryxus Arctic (O. chryxus)

== Range and habitat ==
Occurs from British Columbia to Quebec and south to Minnesota and Michigan. The habitat consists of openings in forests of western jack or lodgepole pine and rocky ridges in spruce forest.

== Biology ==
There is one generation per year with adults on wing from early June to early July. East of south-eastern Manitoba, adults fly in even-numbered years. Westward, they are on wing in odd-numbered years.

=== Larval foods ===
- Poaceae

=== Adult foods ===
- Nectar
