= O. laeta =

O. laeta may refer to:

- Oeneis laeta, an Asian butterfly
- Olea laeta, an evergreen native to southeastern North America
- Orchis laeta, a herbaceous plant
