= Oeneis chryxus valerata =

Conservation status
- Vulnerable (NatureServe)

Scientific classification
- Kingdom: Animalia
- Phylum: Arthropoda
- Clade: Pancrustacea
- Class: Insecta
- Order: Lepidoptera
- Family: Nymphalidae
- Genus: Oeneis
- Species: O. chryxus
- Subspecies: O. c. valerata

Trinomial name
- Oeneis chryxus valerata Burdick, 1958

Subspecies of butterfly

Oeneis chryxus valerata, the Olympic Arctic, is a subspecies of the brown Arctic butterfly that is endemic to the Olympic Mountains of Washington. It clusters into its own clade separate from other subspecies, likely as a result of its isolation.

== Description ==
Males can be distinguished from O. c. chryxus by having a smaller and less defined dark brown submarginal border on the primary, less conspicuous veins and more obvious shading on the limbal area of the primary, less intense tan color on the upper side of the primary, lacking heavy dark brown shading along the margins of the underside of the primary, lacking a dark brown line crossing the center of the underside of the primary from the inner margin to the costal margin and ending in a V shape, and having only one weak apical ocellus rather than 2-3 strong ones on both sides.

Females can be distinguished from O. c. chryxus by having a dark hair-like line on the margins and scattered brown dots from the apex following the margin to the center on the upper side of the primary, lacking a distinguishable brown transverse line going through the center of the primaries on both sides and connecting to the V, lacking the strongly scalloped borders of the mesial band, and lacking the distinctive white dots following the margin of the underside of the secondary.

== Habitat ==
It is found only in alpine tundra habitats at elevations above the tree line of at least 6000-7000 feet (1828.8-2133.6 meters) in the Northeastern Olympic Mountains, with its entire range thought to cover less than 100-250 square kilometers (40-100 square miles), being completely within protected areas such as Hurricane Ridge, Hurricane Hill, Mt. Townsend, and Obstruction Point. Whilst the author originally describing it noted occurrences in Vancouver Island, later research does not support an extended range.
