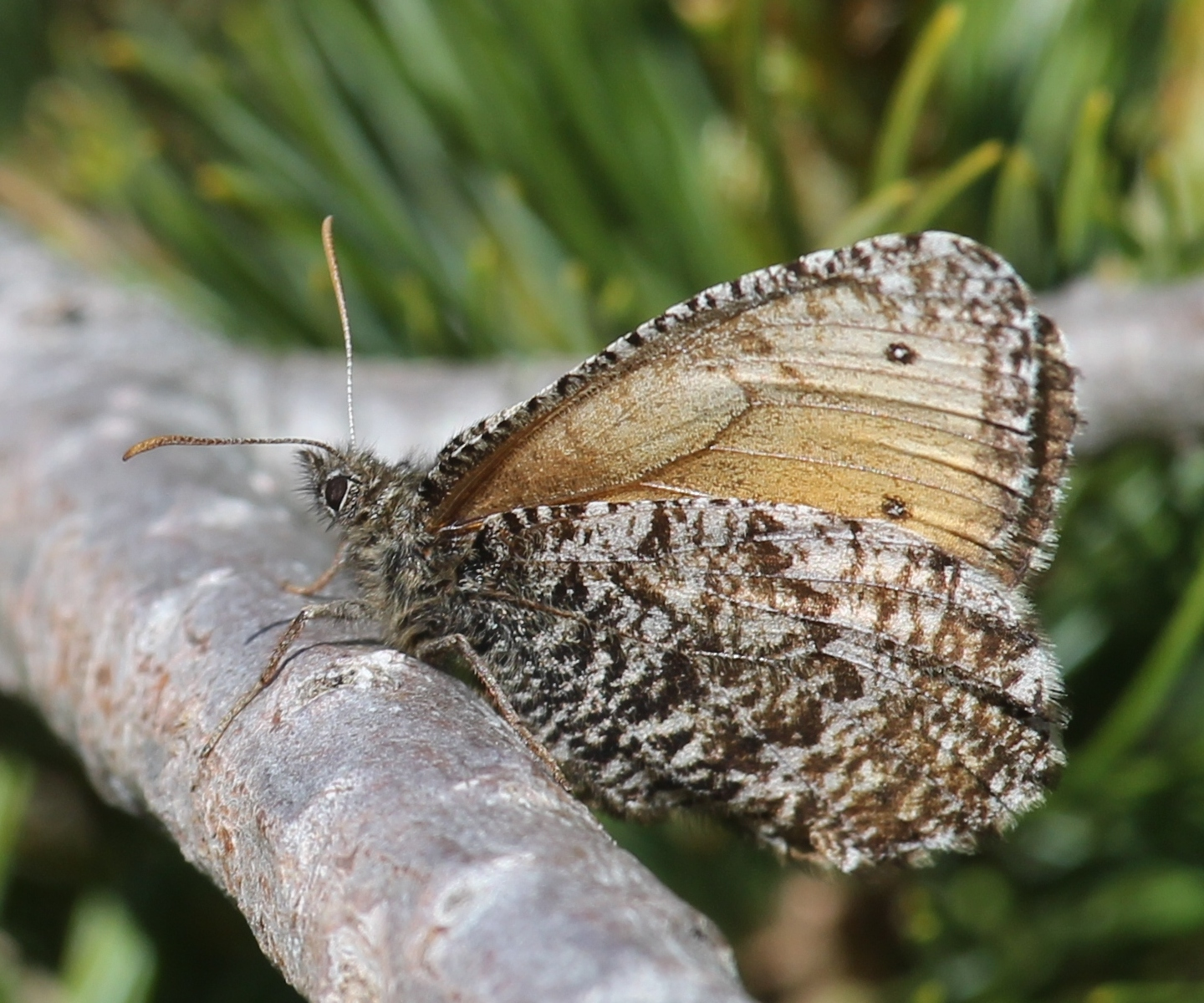
- Oeneis norna asamana in the Hida Mountains of Japan

Scientific classification
- Domain: Eukaryota
- Kingdom: Animalia
- Phylum: Arthropoda
- Class: Insecta
- Order: Lepidoptera
- Family: Nymphalidae
- Genus: Oeneis
- Species: O. norna

Binomial name
- Oeneis norna Thunberg (1791)

Subspecies
- See text

= Oeneis norna =

Norse grayling

Species of butterfly

Oeneis norna, the Norse grayling, is a species of butterfly in the subfamily Satyrinae, that occurs throughout Scandinavia and the northern Palearctic.

== Description ==
It is extremely variable, and the smaller, lighter O. norna often resemble O. bore.

== Range and habitat ==
This species can be found in northern Norway, Sweden, and Finland. In Russia it is seen in the Ural Mountains, Yamal Peninsula, Kola Peninsula, and Siberia. It is also encountered in Japan. Within its range it lives in bogs, damp grassy areas and mossy forest clearings.

== Subspecies ==
- Oeneis norna altaica (Elwes, 1899)
- Oeneis norna tundra (A. Bang-Haas, 1912)
- Oeneis norna radnaevi (Churkin, 1999)
- Oeneis norna arethusoides (Lukhtanov, 1989)
- Oeneis norna rosovi (Kurentzov, 1970)
- Oeneis norna tshukota (Korshunov, 1998)
- Oeneis norna asamana (Matsumura, 1919)
- Oeneis norna sugitanii (Shirôzu, 1952)
- Oeneis norna hilda (Quensel, 1791)

== Life cycle ==
There is one flight a year between mid-June and July. It takes two seasonal cycles for the caterpillars to completely develop. Once the caterpillars hatch many will die without even attempting to eat.

=== Host plants ===
- Phleum pratense
- Poa alpina
- Carex species
- Nardus species
