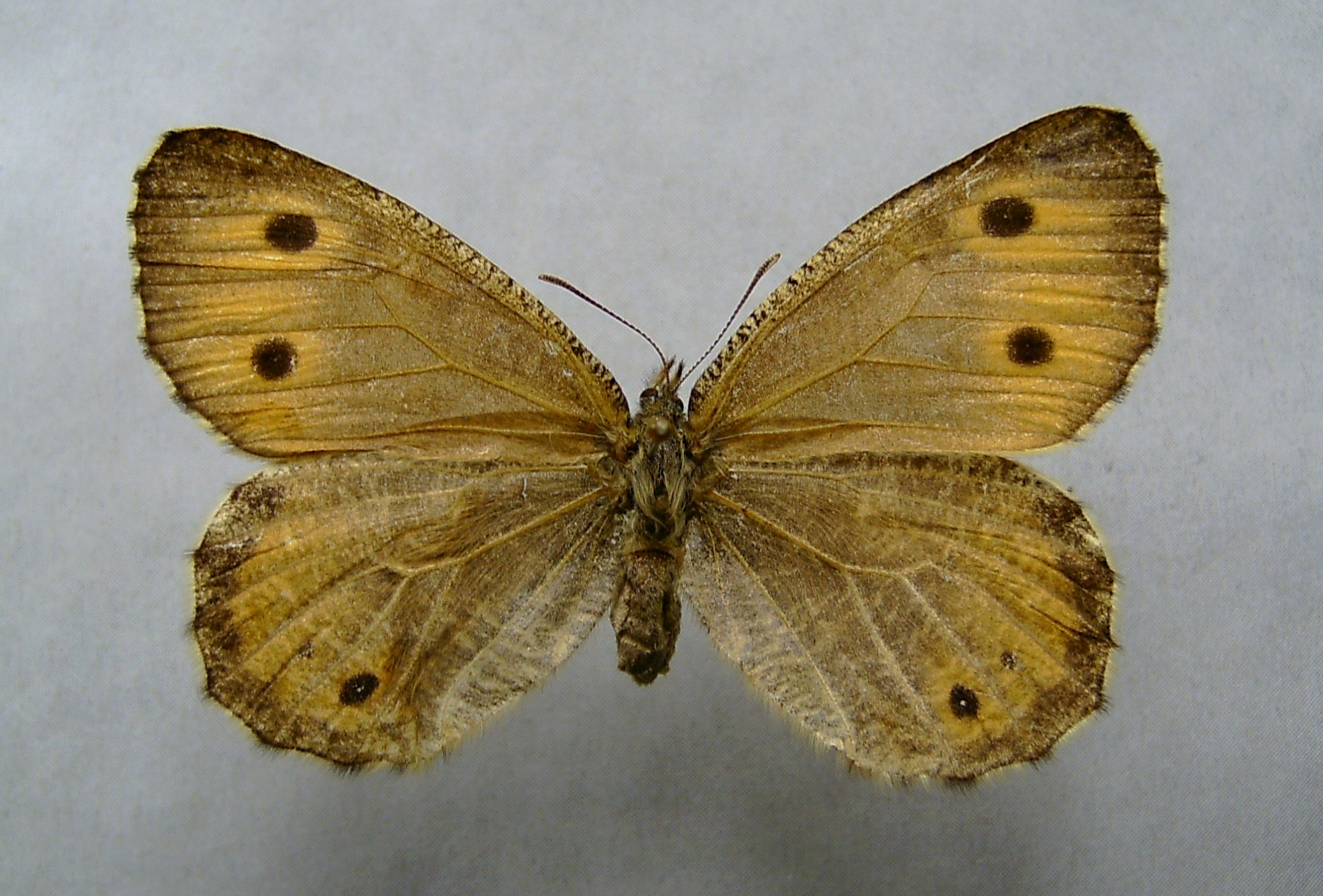

Scientific classification
- Kingdom: Animalia
- Phylum: Arthropoda
- Class: Insecta
- Order: Lepidoptera
- Family: Nymphalidae
- Genus: Oeneis
- Species: O. glacialis

Binomial name
- Oeneis glacialis (Moll, 1785)

= Oeneis glacialis =

Alpine grayling

Species of butterfly

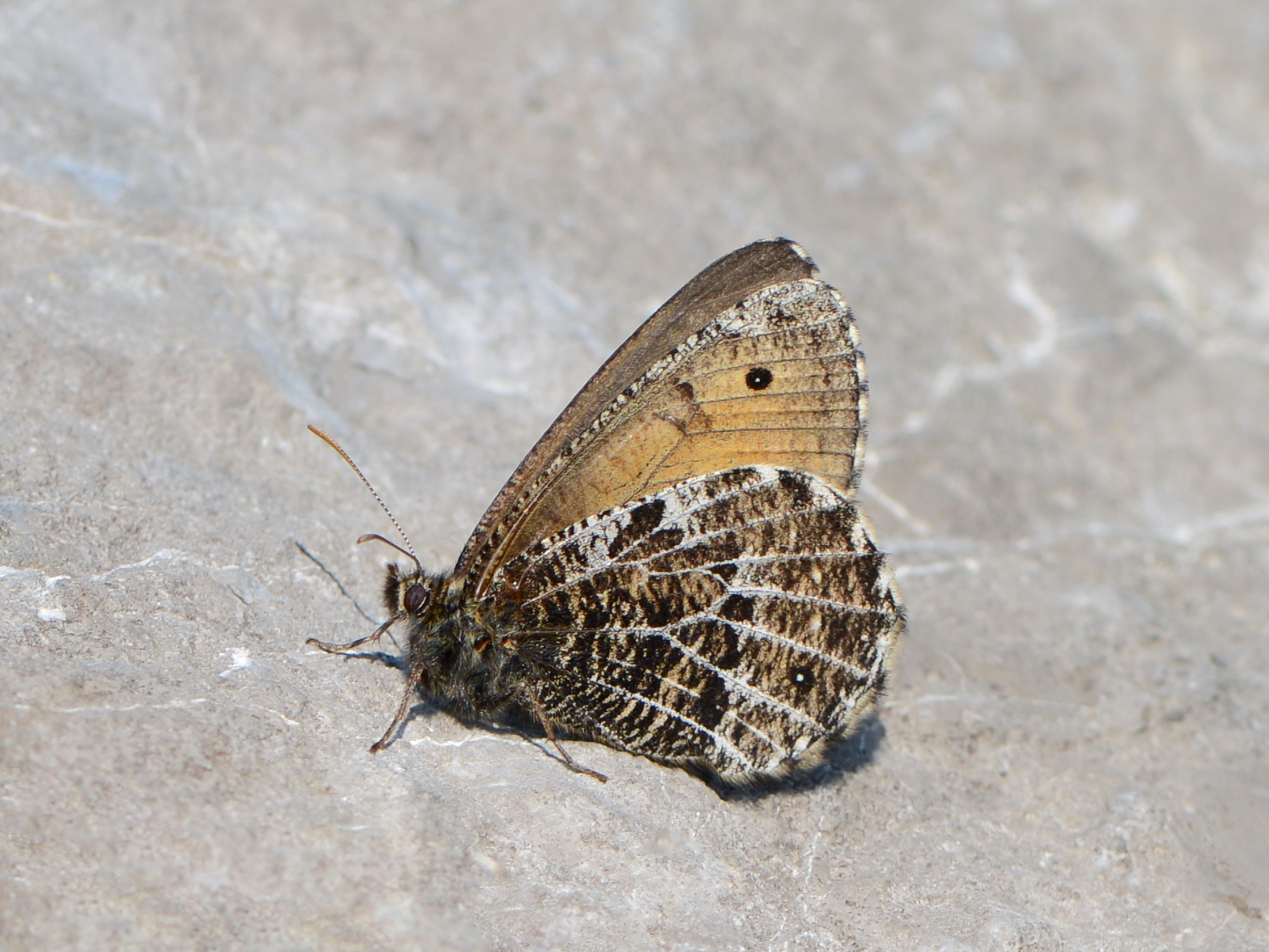
Alpine grayling

Oeneis glacialis, the Alpine Grayling, is a butterfly of the family Nymphalidae. It is found in the Alps at heights of 1400 to 2900 m above sea level.

The wingspan is 50–56 mm. The butterflies are on wing from June to August depending on the location.

The larvae feed on Festuca species.

== Description ==
The upper side of the Alpine Grayling has a pale gray (males) or pale brown (females) basic tint. The dark gray marbled underside of the hind wings is traversed by white wing veins. If you take a cursory look in its alpine habitat, in central Europe the species can only be confused with Lasiommata petropolitana or Lasiommata maera. However, both have large, conspicuous eye-spots on the upper sides of both wings, which the Alpine Grayling lacks.

== Range ==
The species is endemic to the Alps, where it is distributed over the entire Alpine arc with a focus on the Central Alps. Evidence in the Bavarian Alps piles up with 43% of all sites in the particularly intensively researched Allgäu high Alps. In addition, isolated observations are known in the Allgäu from the Vorderen Bregenz Forest (Nagelfluhkette) and from the Vilser Mountains. The Alpine Grayling is relatively common in the Ammergau Alps. There are several reports from the Wetterstein and Karwendel Mountains and the western Kochel Mountains (Ester Mountains). Further east there are only a few reports from the eastern Kocheler Mountains, the Mangfall Mountains and the Chiemgau Alps. What is striking is the lack of it east of the Tiroler Ache as far as the Berchtesgaden Alps. This apparently natural gap on the northern edge of the area is confirmed in the Austrian distribution atlas (Reichl 1992). According to this, the Alpine Grayling only reaches the northern edge of the Alps to the west of the river Inn, while to the east it remains largely restricted to central alpine occurrences.

== Habitat ==
The height amplitude of the reports spans a range of 900-2300 m, with a focus between 1700 m and 2000 m. The German name "Gletscherfalter" (=glacier butterfly), derived from the scientific name "glacialis", is misleading and only a reference to the vertical niche. Rather, a short-grass vegetation structure of various lawn communities in a mosaic with rock and rubble corridors as well as tanning and (soil) dryness reflect the most important habitat requirements.

== Ecology ==
The imagos are fast, agile fliers that often sit on the ground or rock, but also on wood or dry grass. The animals are well camouflaged by the color of the underside of the wings. The males show territorial behavior or hide hunting for females flying past, whereby other insects are also accidentally approached. Flower visits are hardly documented in Bavaria, so far Acinos alpinus, Rhododendron hirsutum and Thymus spp. reported as nectar plants.

The eggs are laid individually and close to the ground mostly on withered grass leaves. Festuca ovina agg. and other Festuca species are known as host plants in the higher altitudes. As far as is known so far, larval development takes place every two years, with the young caterpillar and then the last caterpillar stadiums overwintering. The flight time differs due to the great height amplitude. The species usually flies from early June to early August, with a peak between late June and mid-July. In lower-lying occurrences and in unusually dry and warm springs (e.g. 2003, 2007), the species can be observed from mid-May. Depending on the weather, the imagos can be quite long-lived. The species shows a two-year development: The available data for Bavaria show the odd years (e.g. 2001, 2003, 2005) as the flight years with more individuals, without the Alpine Grayling being remarkably rare in even years at all.

== Etymology ==
aello: Greek for "One of the harpies sent by the gods to punish people."

== Taxonomy ==
Synonym: Papilio aello Huebner, [1803-1804]
