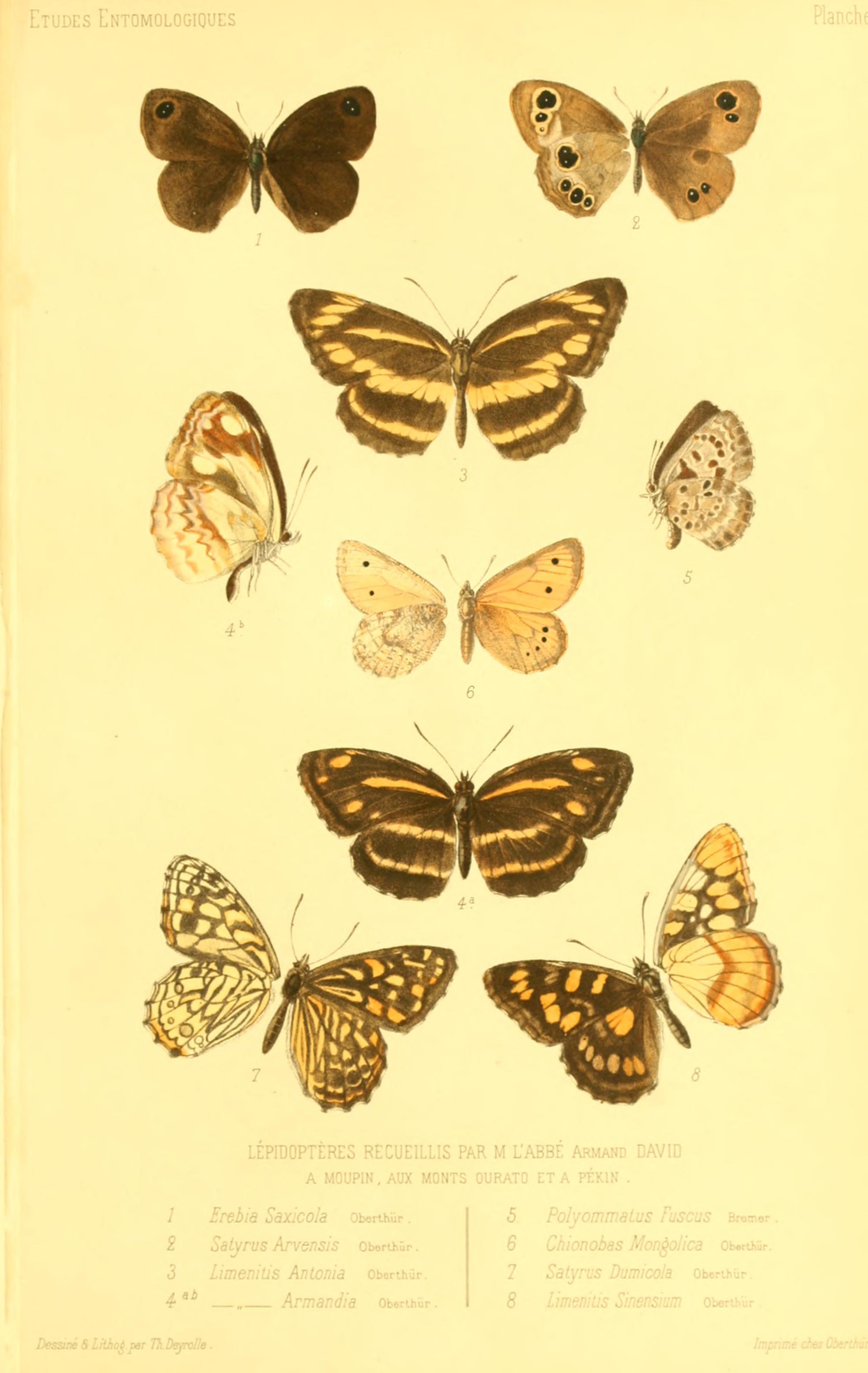
- Oberthür's plate showing Chionobas mongolica as figure 6

Scientific classification
- Domain: Eukaryota
- Kingdom: Animalia
- Phylum: Arthropoda
- Class: Insecta
- Order: Lepidoptera
- Family: Nymphalidae
- Genus: Oeneis
- Species: O. mongolica

Binomial name
- Oeneis mongolica (Oberthür, 1876)

Synonyms
- Chionobas mongolica Oberthür, 1876; Oeneis mongolica mandschurica O. Bang-Haas, 1939; Oeneis mongolica var. tsingtaua Austaut, 1911; Oeneis nanna coreana ab. okamotonis Matsumura, 1927; Oeneis nanna coreana Matsumura, 1927; Oeneis mongolica walkyria Fixsen, 1887; Oeneis nanna walkyria ab. shonis Matsumura, 1927

= Oeneis mongolica =

Species of butterfly

Oeneis mongolica is a butterfly of the family Nymphalidae. It was described by Charles Oberthür in 1876. It is found in China, Mongolia and Korea.

== Subspecies ==
- Oeneis mongolica mongolica (north-eastern China, Inner Mongolia, Liaoning)
- Oeneis mongolica coreana Matsumura, 1927 (North Korea)
- Oeneis mongolica hallasanensis Murayama, 1991 (Korea: Cheju-do Island)
- Oeneis mongolica hoenei Gross, 1970 (northern China: Shanxi)
- Oeneis mongolica walkyria Fixsen, 1887 (central Korea)
