= Oeneis elwesi =

Scientific classification
- Domain: Eukaryota
- Kingdom: Animalia
- Phylum: Arthropoda
- Class: Insecta
- Order: Lepidoptera
- Family: Nymphalidae
- Genus: Oeneis
- Species: O. elwesi

Binomial name
- Oeneis elwesi Staudinger, 1901

Synonyms
- Oeneis solanikovi Kurentzov, 1970; Oeneis tannuola O. Bang-Haas, 1927; Oeneis ulugchemi Korshunov, 1995

Species of butterfly

Oeneis elwesi is a butterfly of the family Nymphalidae. It is found south of the Altai and Sayan Mountains and Mongolia.

Adults are on wing from May to June.

== Subspecies ==
- Oeneis elwesi elwesi (Altai, western Tuva)
- Oeneis elwesi tannuola (south-eastern Tuva (Tannuola Mountains), north-western Mongolia, northern Mongolia)
- Oeneis elwesi ulugchemi (central Tuva (Yenisei River basin))
