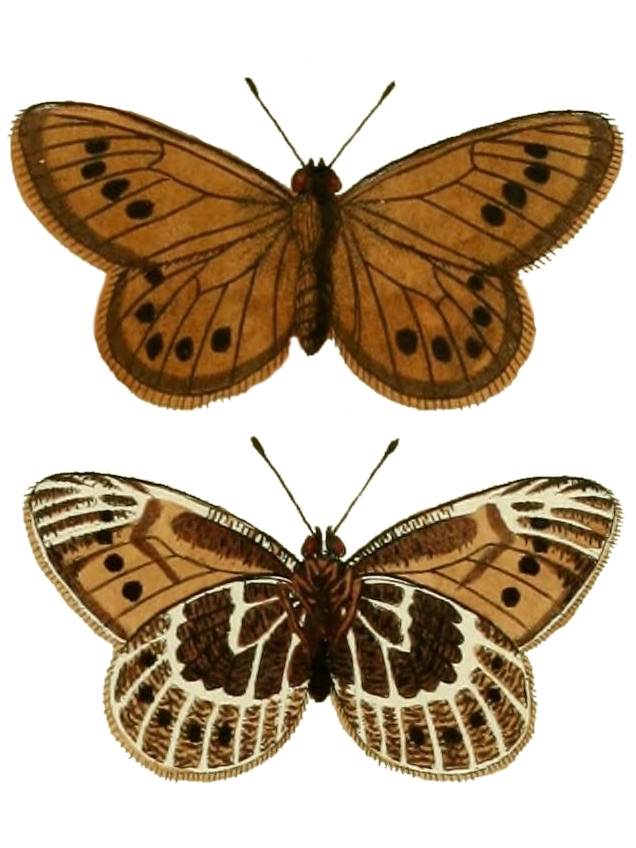

Scientific classification
- Domain: Eukaryota
- Kingdom: Animalia
- Phylum: Arthropoda
- Class: Insecta
- Order: Lepidoptera
- Family: Nymphalidae
- Genus: Oeneis
- Species: O. tarpeja

Binomial name
- Oeneis tarpeja (Pallas, 1771)

Synonyms
- Papilio tarpeja Pallas, 1771; Oeneis tarpeia; Oeneis (Protoeneis) tarpeia; Papilio celimene Stoll, [1782]; Oeneis vacuna Grum-Grshimailo, 1891

= Oeneis tarpeja =

Species of butterfly

Oeneis tarpeja is a species of butterfly in the family Nymphalidae. It is found from the Caucasus and Volga region across Kazakhstan and southern Siberia to the Amur region and Mongolia. In Ukraine this species became extirpated in the mid-twentieth century. The habitat consists of steppe-clad plains and foothills.

The wingspan is 45–50 mm. Adults are on wing from June to July.

The larvae feed on Poa avena and Festuca ovina.

== Subspecies ==
- Oeneis tarpeja tarpeja (south-eastern Europe, northern Caucasus, southern Urals, south-western Siberia, Altai, northern and eastern Kazakhstan, western Mongolia, north-western China)
- Oeneis tarpeja baueri Lukhtanov & Eitschberger, 2000 (Tuva)
- Oeneis tarpeja grossi Eitschberger & Lukhtanov, 1994 (Buryatia, Chita, northern Mongolia)
