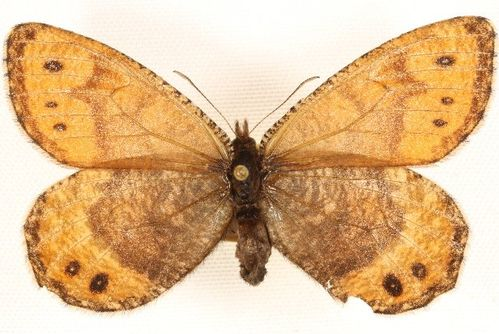

Scientific classification
- Kingdom: Animalia
- Phylum: Arthropoda
- Class: Insecta
- Order: Lepidoptera
- Family: Nymphalidae
- Genus: Oeneis
- Species: O. alpina

Binomial name
- Oeneis alpina Kurentzov, 1970

Subspecies
- Oeneis alpina alpina; Oeneis alpina execubitor

Synonyms
- Oeneis excubitor Troubridge, Philip, Scott & Shepard, 1982

= Oeneis alpina =

Species of butterfly

Oeneis alpina, the sentinel Arctic or Eskimo Arctic, is a species of butterfly in the subfamily Satyrinae. It occurs in Siberia and the northern parts of North America.

== Description ==
The wing span of O. alpina is about forty millimetres. The wings are orangish-brown, with the base two thirds a much darker shade. The forewing has one to three eyespots with white centres and the hindwing has two. The underside of the wings also have these eyespots, and the underside of the hindwing is mottled with brown and grey streaks. The female is a little larger than the male with the basal region of the wing a paler shade. This species resembles the brown Arctic (Oeneis chryxus) but the latter has a single eyespot on its hindwing.

== Distribution ==
Oeneis alpina occurs in north east Siberia, in the Chukot and Magadan regions, and the tundra regions of Alaska, Yukon and the Northwest Territories. It is generally uncommon but occasionally abundant locally.

== Reproduction ==
There is a single brood per year in June and July. The males congregate on hilltops, screes and rocky places in tundra regions and the females fly to join them. After mating, the females return to wet boggy land where they deposit their eggs on or near their host plants which are believed to be grasses, (Poa species). Little is known of the development of the larvae, but it is assumed that they overwinter twice before maturing as the butterflies are locally abundant only in alternate years.

== Subspecies ==
- Oeneis alpina alpina (Magadan, Chukot Peninsula)
- Oeneis alpina execubitor Troubridge, Philip, Scott & Shepard, 1982 (northern Yukon, Northwest Territories, northern Alaska)

== Similar species ==
Chryxus Arctic (O. chryxus)
