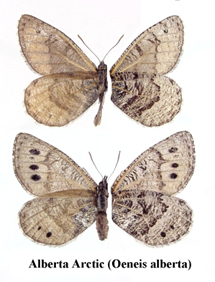

Scientific classification
- Domain: Eukaryota
- Kingdom: Animalia
- Phylum: Arthropoda
- Class: Insecta
- Order: Lepidoptera
- Family: Nymphalidae
- Genus: Oeneis
- Species group: Oeneis (bore)
- Species: O. alberta

Binomial name
- Oeneis alberta Elwes, 1893

Synonyms
- Oeneis tarpeia alberta

= Oeneis alberta =

Species of butterfly

Oeneis alberta, the Alberta Arctic, is a butterfly of the family Nymphalidae. It is found from the Canadian prairie provinces east to southern Manitoba. Isolated populations are found along the Rocky Mountains in Colorado, New Mexico and Arizona.

The wingspan is 35–57 mm. Adults are on wing from May to June in one generation per year.

The larvae feed on bunch grass, possibly Festuca species. The species overwinters in the larval stage.

== Subspecies ==
- Oeneis alberta alberta (Manitoba, Saskatchewan, Alberta, British Columbia, Montana, North Dakota)
- Oeneis alberta oslari Skinner, 1911 (Colorado)
- Oeneis alberta capulinensis F.M. Brown, 1970 (New Mexico)
- Oeneis alberta daura (Strecker, 1894) (Arizona)
