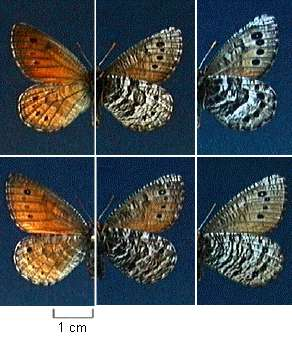

Scientific classification
- Domain: Eukaryota
- Kingdom: Animalia
- Phylum: Arthropoda
- Class: Insecta
- Order: Lepidoptera
- Family: Nymphalidae
- Genus: Oeneis
- Species: O. uhleri

Binomial name
- Oeneis uhleri (Reakirt, 1866)

Synonyms
- Chionobas uhleri Reakirt, 1866; Oeneis obscura Edwards, 1892; Chionobas varuna Edwards, 1882; Oeneis dennisi Gunder, 1927; Oeneis nahanni Dyar, 1904

= Oeneis uhleri =

Species of butterfly

Oeneis uhleri, or Uhler's Arctic, is a species of butterfly in the family Nymphalidae.

The larvae feed on various grasses and sedges, including Festuca, Koeleria and Poa species. Fourth-instar larvae overwinter and emerge in spring.

== Subspecies ==
- Oeneis uhleri uhleri (Colorado: eastern slope)
- Oeneis uhleri cairnesi Gibson, 1920 (Yukon, north-western Northwest Territories, north-eastern Alaska)
- Oeneis uhleri nahanni Dyar, 1904 (Northwest Territories: Mackenzie Mountains)
- Oeneis uhleri reinthali Brown, 1953 (Colorado: western slope)
- Oeneis uhleri varuna (Edwards, 1882) (British Columbia, Alberta, Saskatchewan, Manitoba, Montana, North Dakota, South Dakota, Nebraska, western Minnesota)
