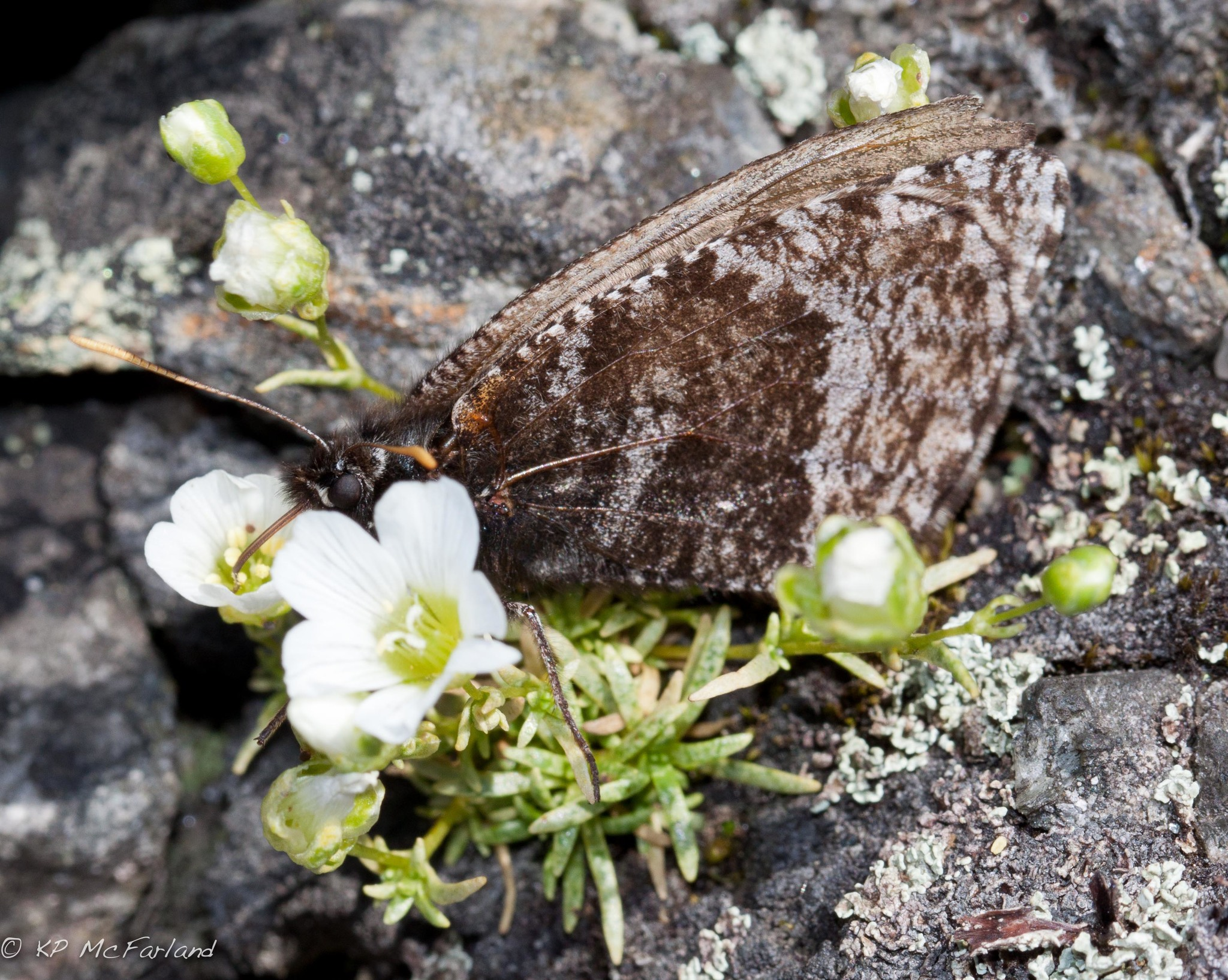

Scientific classification
- Kingdom: Animalia
- Phylum: Arthropoda
- Class: Insecta
- Order: Lepidoptera
- Family: Nymphalidae
- Genus: Oeneis
- Species: O. melissa

Binomial name
- Oeneis melissa (Fabricius, 1775)

Synonyms
- Papilio melissa Fabricius, 1775; Oeneis beanii Elwes, 1893; Oeneis arctica Gibson, 1920; Oeneis simulans Gibson, 1920; Hipparchia semidea Say, 1828; Oeneis eritiosa Harris; Oeneis aeno Boisduval; Oeneis nigra (Edwards, 1894); Oeneis daisetsuzana Matsumura, 1926

= Oeneis melissa =

Species of butterfly

Oeneis melissa, the Melissa Arctic, is a species of butterfly in the family Nymphalidae.

The wingspan is 42–51 mm.

The larvae feed on various sedges, including Carex bigelowii and Carex rupestris.

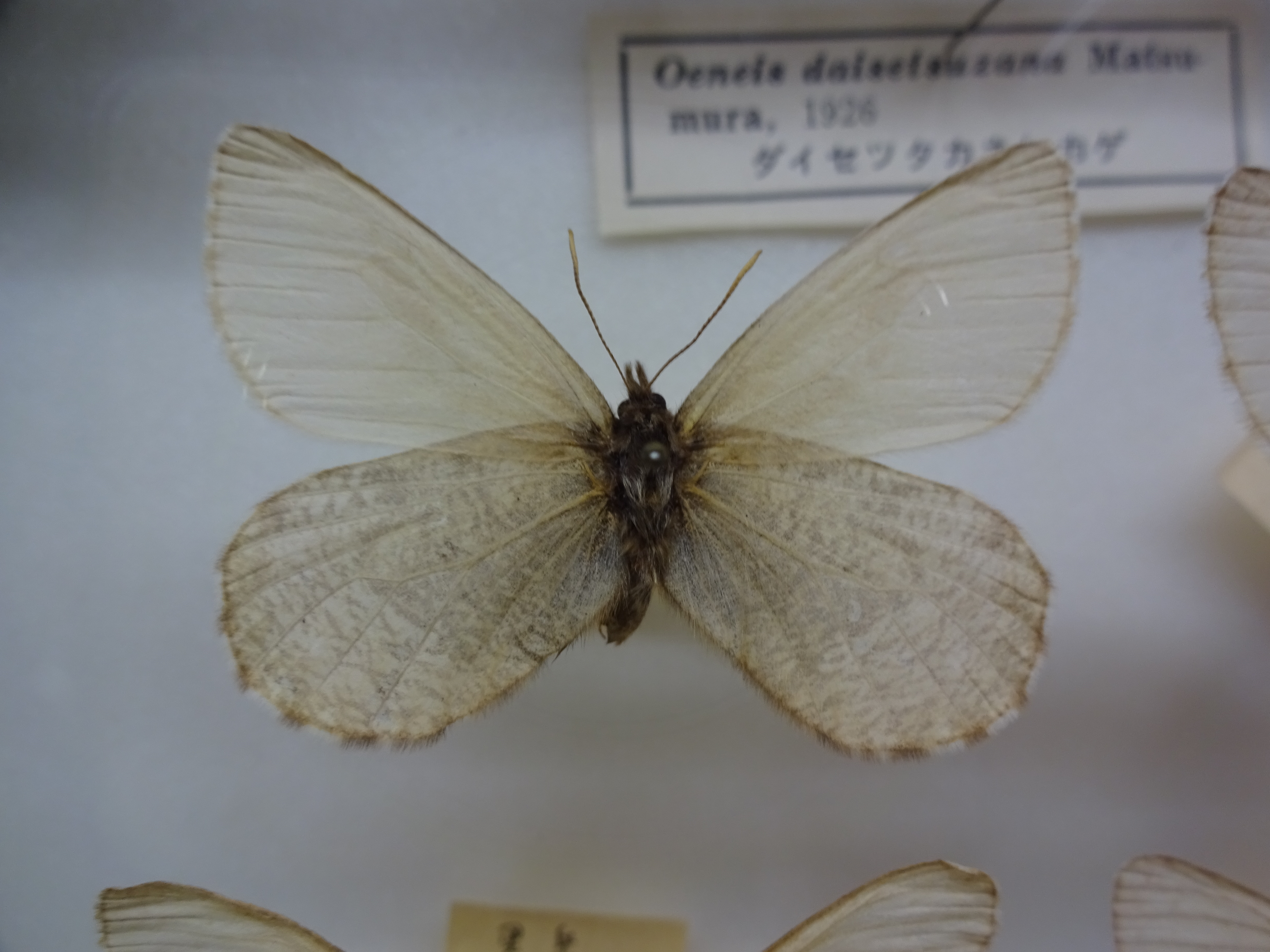
Oeneis melissa daizetsuzana, Japan

== Subspecies ==
- Oeneis melissa melissa (Newfoundland, Labrador)
- Oeneis melissa also (Boisduval, [1833]) (Polar Urals, Arctic Asia, Taymur, Chukot Peninsula, Kamchatka, Wrangel Island)
- Oeneis melissa orientalis Kurentzov, 1970 (eastern Yakutia, Magadan)
- Oeneis melissa daizetsuzana Matsumura, 1926 (Japan)
- Oeneis melissa semidea (Say, 1828) (New Hampshire)
- Oeneis melissa semplei Holland, 1931 (Quebec, inner Labrador, Hudson Bay)
- Oeneis melissa assimilis Butler, 1868 (Northwest Territories)
- Oeneis melissa gibsoni Holland, 1931 (Alaska, Yukon, northern British Columbia)
- Oeneis melissa beanii Elwes, 1893 (Alberta, British Columbia, Washington, Montana, Wyoming)
- Oeneis melissa lucilla Barnes & McDunnough, 1918
- Oeneis melissa karae Kusnezov, 1925 (polar tundra of northern Siberia)
