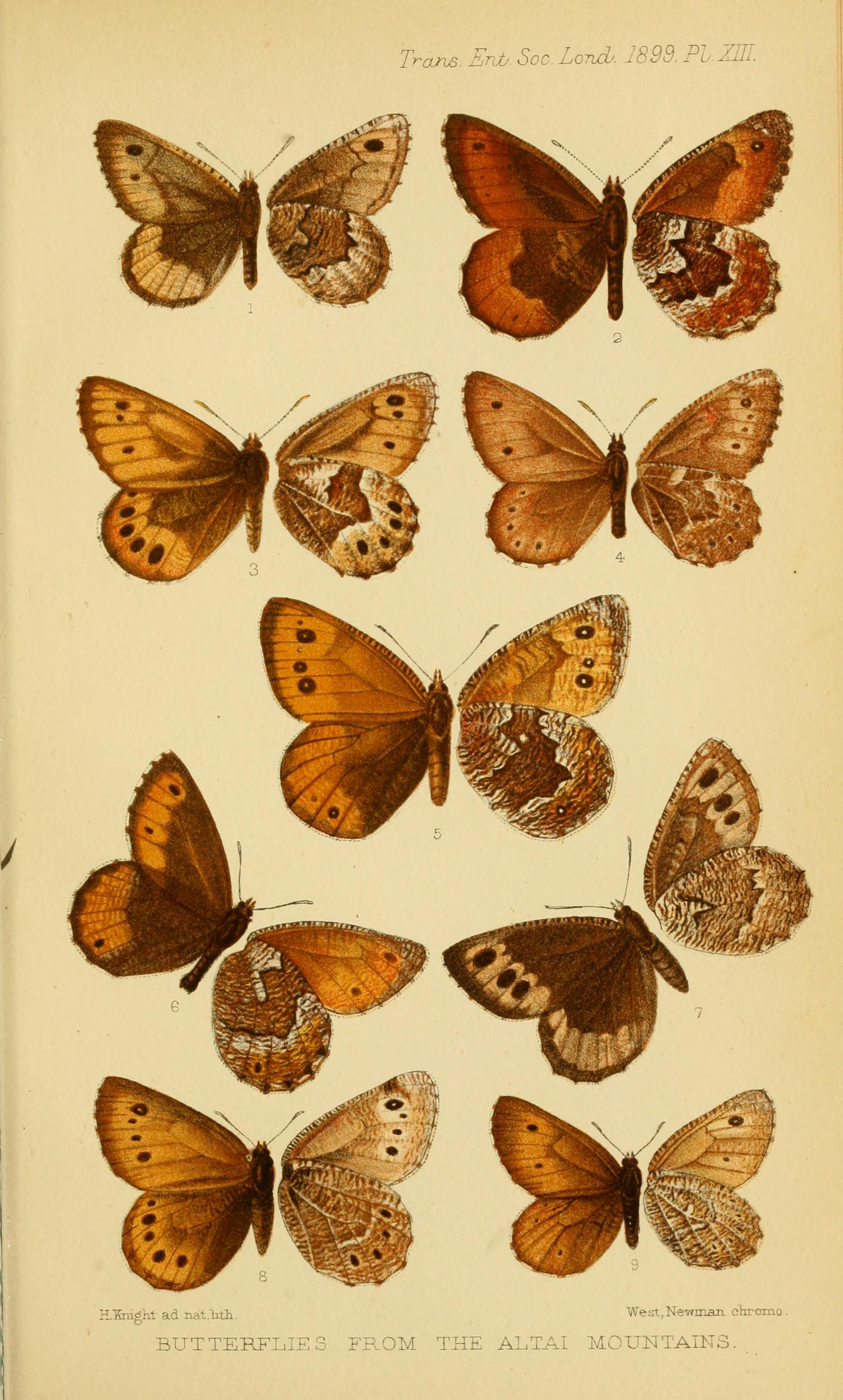
- Oeneis magna dubia male, figure 6

Scientific classification
- Domain: Eukaryota
- Kingdom: Animalia
- Phylum: Arthropoda
- Class: Insecta
- Order: Lepidoptera
- Family: Nymphalidae
- Genus: Oeneis
- Species: O. magna

Binomial name
- Oeneis magna Graeser, 1888

Synonyms
- Oeneis transbaicalica Kurentzov, 1970; Oeneis mongolica Kurentzov, 1970; Oeneis judini Korshunov, 1988; Oeneis dubia Elwes, 1899; Oeneis staudingeri Austaut, 1909

= Oeneis magna =

Species of butterfly

Oeneis magna is a butterfly of the family Nymphalidae. It was described by Ludwig Carl Friedrich Graeser in 1888. It is found from the Altai Mountains to southern Siberia and the Russian Far East, Mongolia, northern China and Korea. The habitat consists of sparse woodlands and mountain tundras.

Adults are on wing from May to July.

The larvae feed on Carex species.

== Subspecies ==
- Oeneis magna magna (southern Siberia, Transbaikalia, southern Yakutia, Amur, Sikhote-Alin, Shantar Island, north-eastern China: Manchuria, north-eastern Mongolia)
- Oeneis magna dubia Elwes, 1899 (Altai, Sayan, western Tuva, western Mongolia)
- Oeneis magna eltgoli Yakovlev, 2006
- Oeneis magna kamtschatica Kurentzov, 1970 (Kamchatka)
- Oeneis magna kurentzovi Murayama, 1973 (eastern Tuva, eastern Sayan, northern Mongolia)
- Oeneis magna magadanica Kurentzov, 1970 (Yakutia, Magadan, Chukot Peninsula)
- Oeneis magna pupavkini Korshunov, 1995 (Polar Ural, north-western Siberia, Krasnoyarsk region)
- Oeneis magna uchangi Im, 1988 (Korea)
