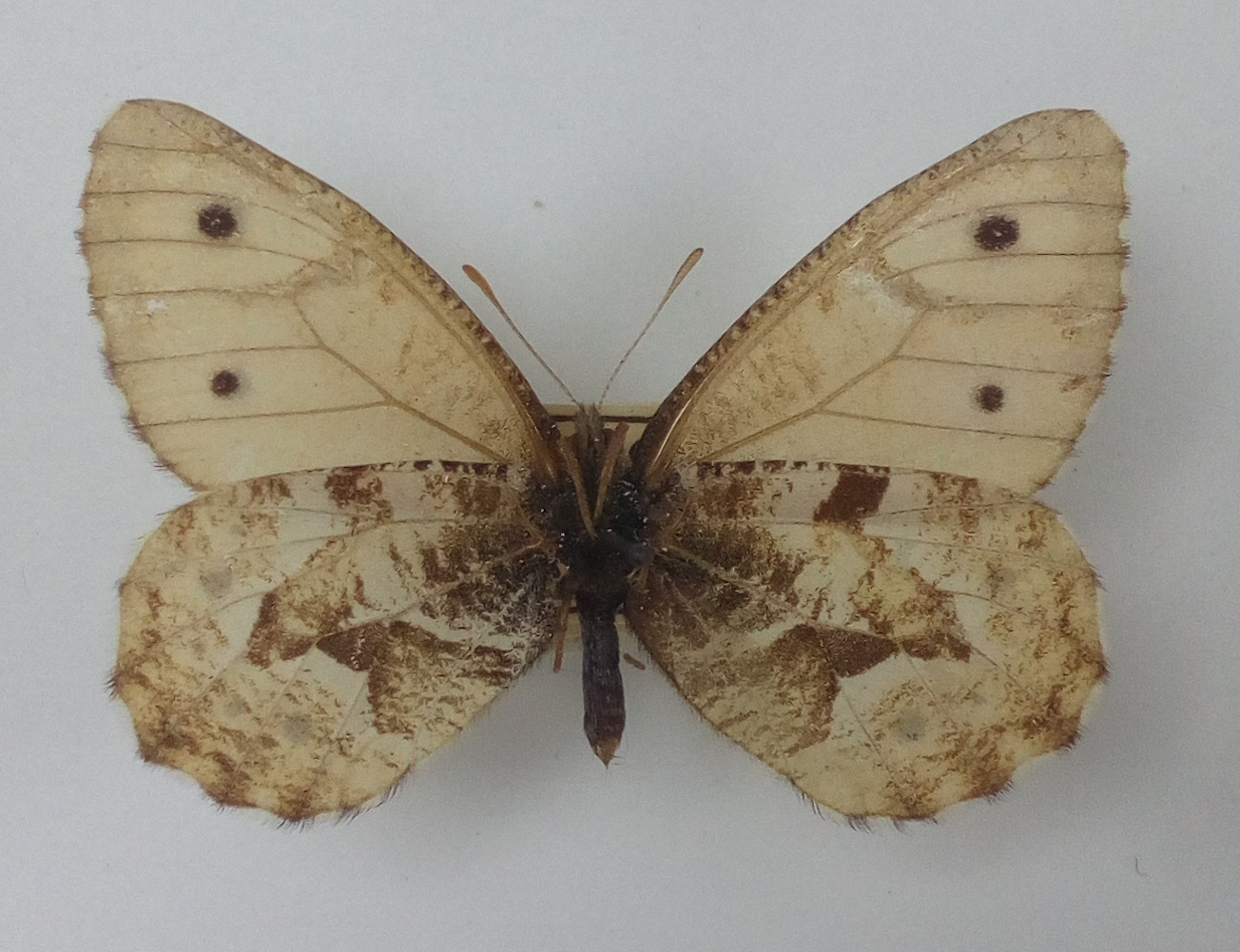

Scientific classification
- Domain: Eukaryota
- Kingdom: Animalia
- Phylum: Arthropoda
- Class: Insecta
- Order: Lepidoptera
- Family: Nymphalidae
- Genus: Oeneis
- Species: O. urda

Binomial name
- Oeneis urda (Eversmann, 1847)

Synonyms
- Hipparchia urda Eversmann, 1847; Oeneis umbra Staudinger, 1892; Oeneis coriacea Setiz, 1909; Oeneis banghaasi Austaut, 1908; Oeneis albidior Austaut, 1908; Oeneis laeta Austaut, 1908

= Oeneis urda =

Species of butterfly

Oeneis urda is a butterfly of the family Nymphalidae. It was described by Eduard Friedrich Eversmann in 1847. It is found from Russia (northern Altai, southern Siberia, Transbaikal, Amur, Primorye, Yakutia) to northern Mongolia, north-eastern China and Korea. The habitat consists of steppe-clad slopes.

Adults are on wing from June to July.

== Subspecies ==
- Oeneis urda urda (northern Altai, southern Siberia, Transbaikal, Amur, Primorye, Yakutia, northern Mongolia, north-eastern China)
- Oeneis urda monteviri Bryk, 1946 (North Korea)
- Oeneis urda tschiliensis O. Bang-Haas, 1933 (north-eastern China: Jilin)
