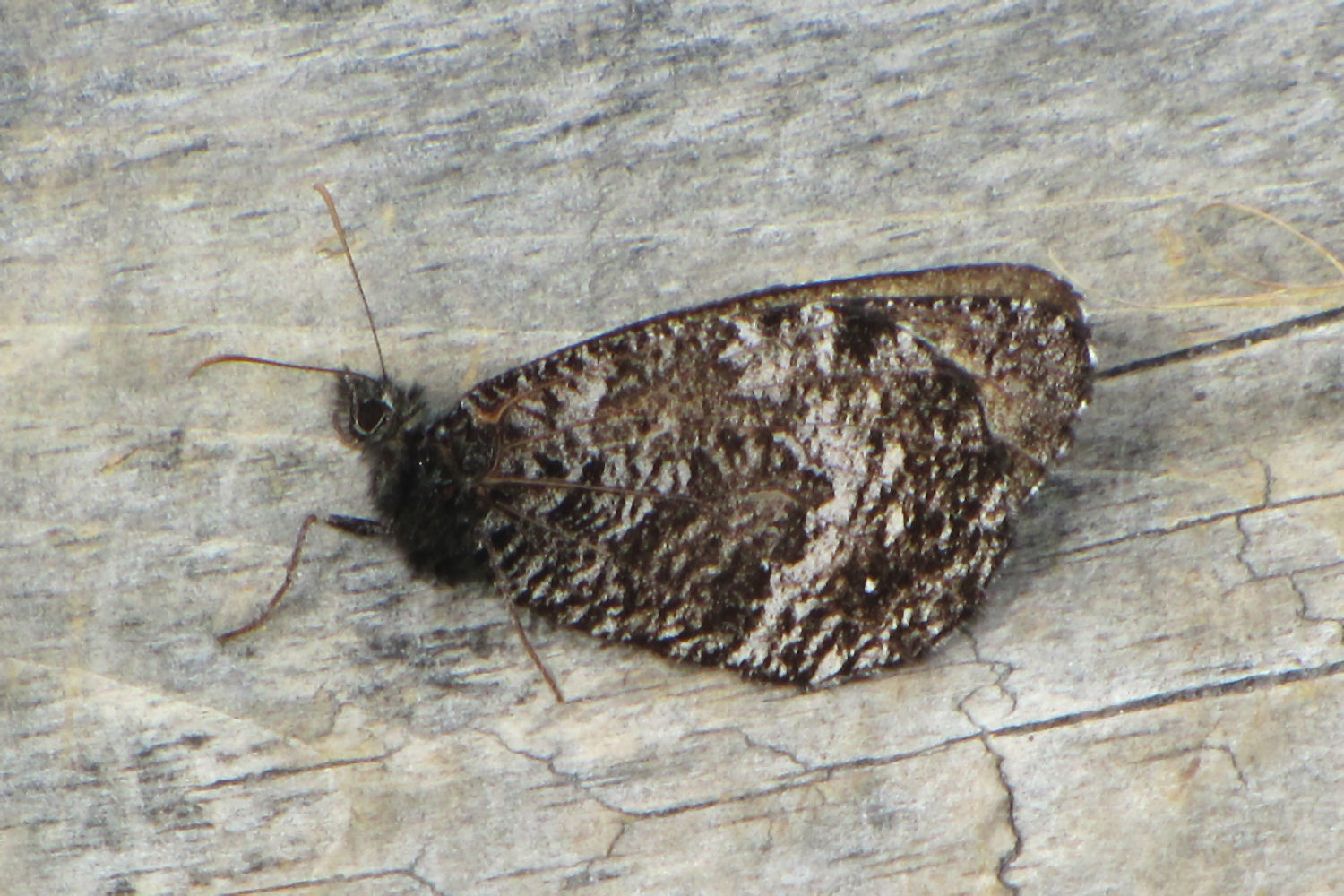
- Found in Newfoundland, Canada

Scientific classification
- Kingdom: Animalia
- Phylum: Arthropoda
- Class: Insecta
- Order: Lepidoptera
- Family: Nymphalidae
- Genus: Oeneis
- Species: O. jutta

Binomial name
- Oeneis jutta (Hübner, [1806-1806])

Subspecies
- 11, see text

Synonyms
- Papilio jutta Hübner, [1805-1806]

= Oeneis jutta =

Species of butterfly

Oeneis jutta, the Jutta Arctic or Baltic grayling, is a species of butterfly in the subfamily Satyrinae with a Circumboreal distribution. It occurs in bogs and tundra in the north of Europe, the Baltic states, the Urals, Siberia, northern Kazakhstan, the Russian Far East, northern Mongolia, northeastern China, North Korea, and northern North America (Canada from Newfoundland to British Columbia). Larvae feed on Carex and Eriophorum, possibly also Glyceria, Molinia, and Juncus. Ledum palustre is the preferred nectar plant of the adult butterflies. The species has one generation every one or two years, depending on the location.

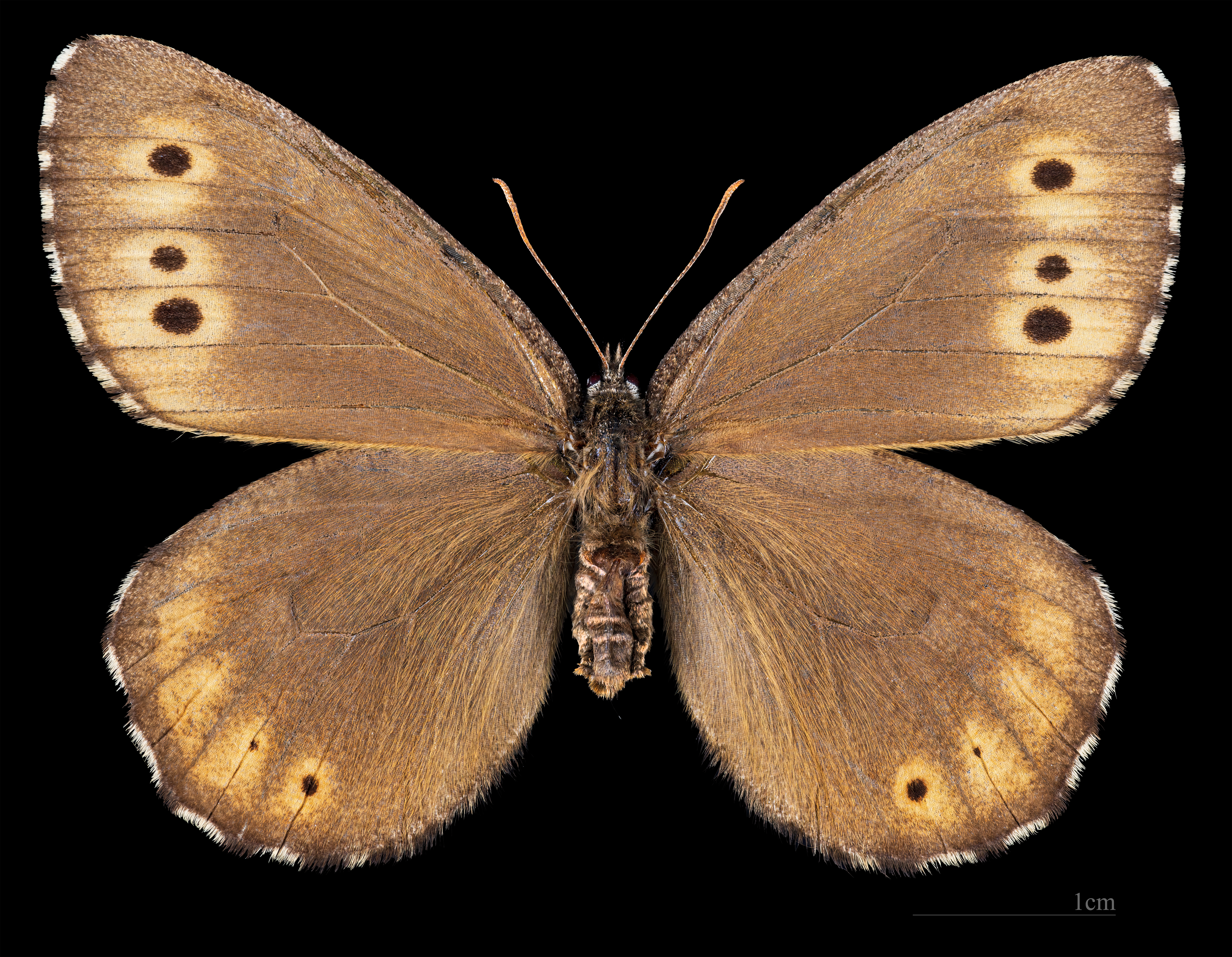
Oeneis jutta jutta ♂

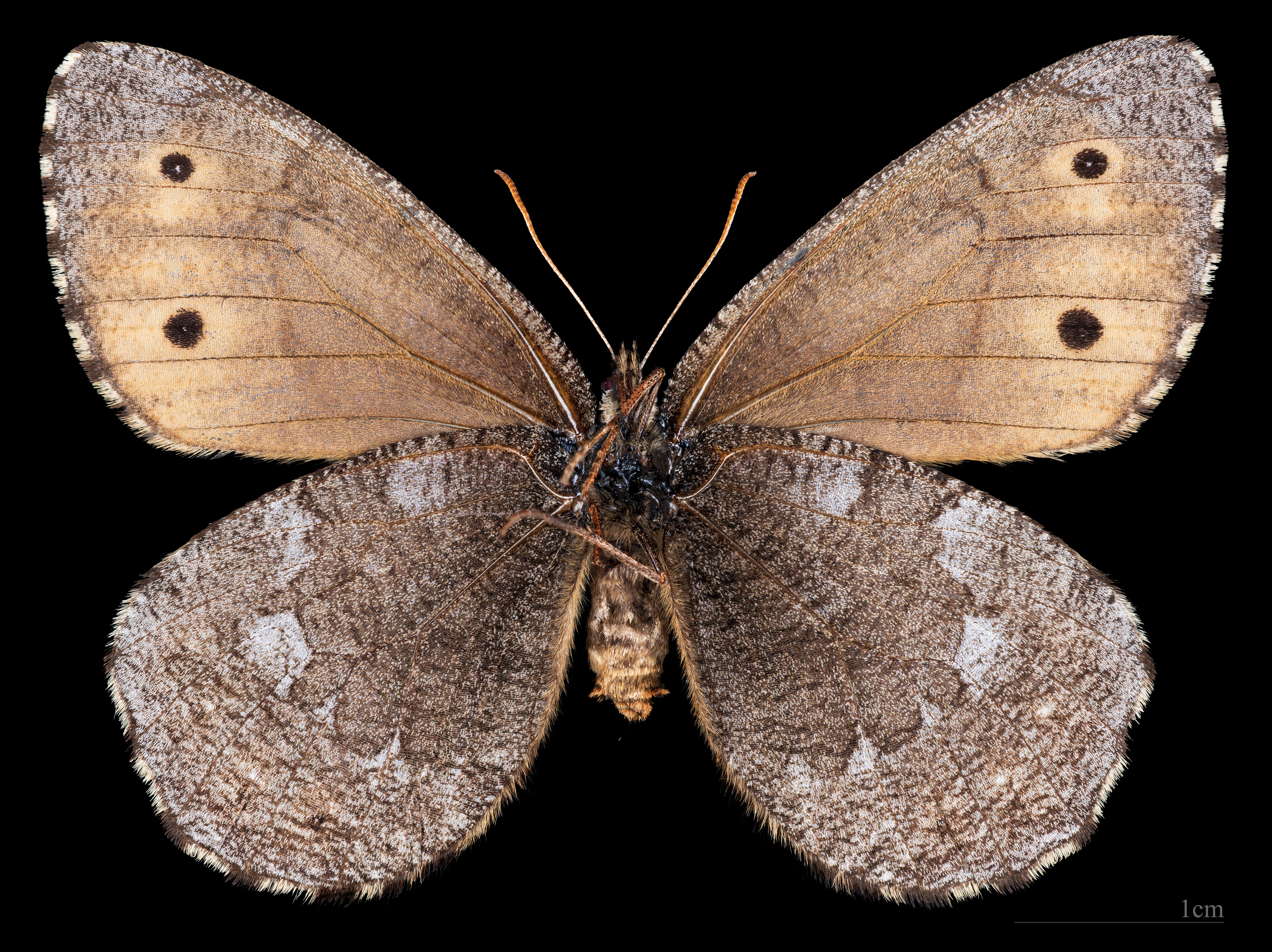
Oeneis jutta jutta ♂ △

== Subspecies ==
Listed alphabetically:

- Oeneis jutta akoene Belik & Yakovlev, 1998 − Altai, western Tuva
- Oeneis jutta alaskensis Holland, 1900 − Alaska, Yukon, northern British Columbia
- Oeneis jutta ascerta Masters & Sorenson, 1968 − southeastern Manitoba, Ontario, Quebec, Minnesota, Wisconsin, northern Michigan, northern Maine, northern New Hampshire
- Oeneis jutta balderi (Geyer, 1837) − Newfoundland
- Oeneis jutta chermocki Wyatt, 1965 − western Alberta, southern British Columbia
- Oeneis jutta harperi Chermock, 1969 − northern Manitoba, eastern Northwest Territories
- Oeneis jutta jutta
- Oeneis jutta leussleri Bryant, 1935 − western Northwest Territories
- Oeneis jutta reducta McDunnough, 1929
- Oeneis jutta ridingiana F. & R. Chermock, 1940 − southwestern Manitoba, Saskatchewan
- Oeneis jutta sibirica Kurentzov, 1970 − Yakutia, Magadan, Chukot Peninsula
