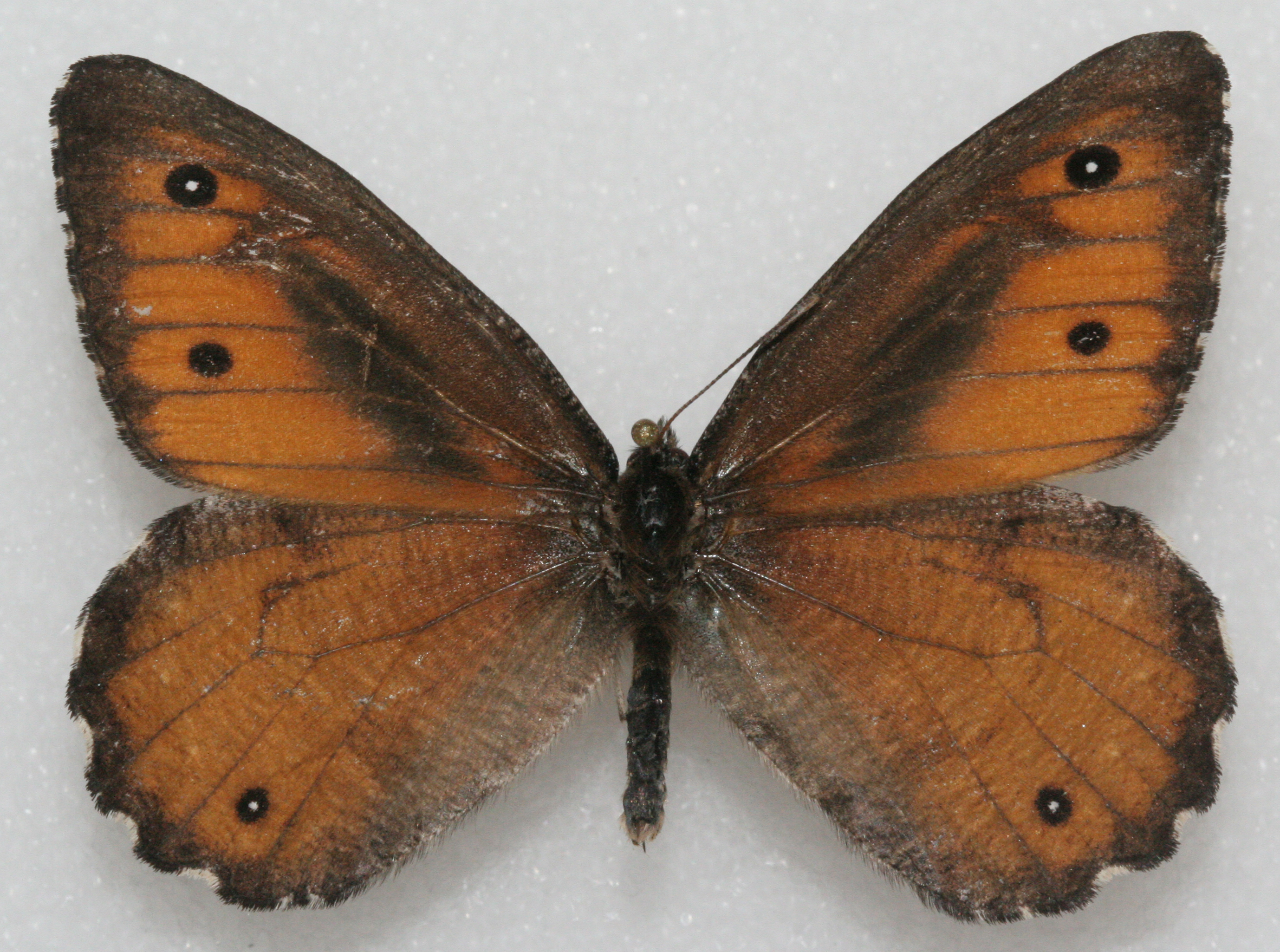
- Male O. n. nevadensis

Scientific classification
- Domain: Eukaryota
- Kingdom: Animalia
- Phylum: Arthropoda
- Class: Insecta
- Order: Lepidoptera
- Family: Nymphalidae
- Genus: Oeneis
- Species group: Oeneis (bore)
- Species: O. nevadensis

Binomial name
- Oeneis nevadensis (C. Felder & R. Felder, [1867])

Synonyms
- Chionobas nevadensis C. Felder & R. Felder, [1867]; Chionobas californica Boisduval, 1868

= Oeneis nevadensis =

Species of butterfly

Oeneis nevadensis is a species of butterfly in the family Nymphalidae. It is commonly known as the great Arctic, Nevada Arctic, great grayling, Felder's Arctic, or Pacific Arctic. It is native to northwestern North America.

== Subspecies ==
- Oeneis nevadensis nevadensis (C. Felder & R. Felder, [1867])
- Oeneis nevadensis gigas Butler, 1868
- Oeneis nevadensis iduna (Edwards, 1874)

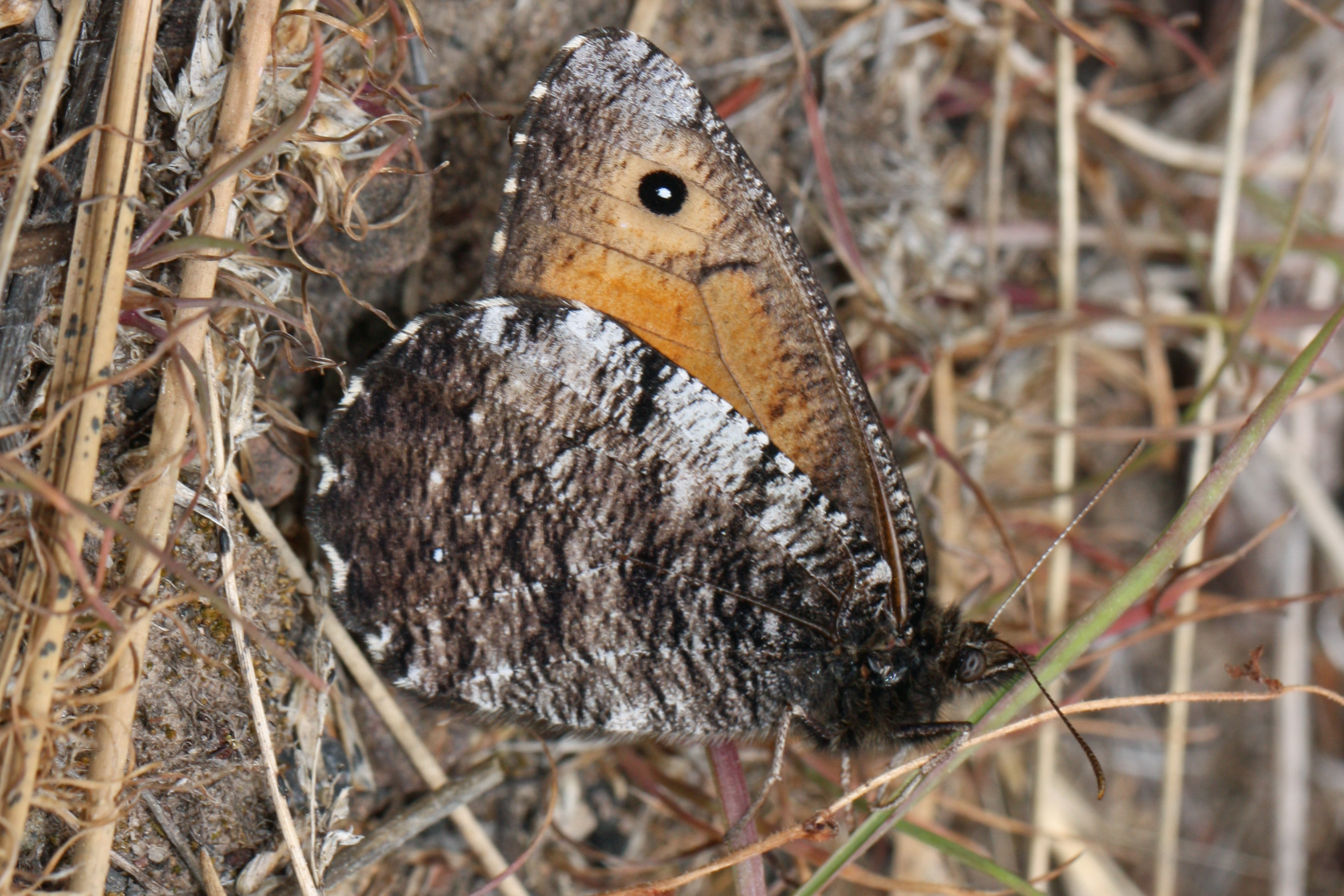
The leading edge of the hindwing is light grey with a dark-grey triangle on the post-median line.

== Description ==
The wingspan of the great Arctic measures 2 to 2.5 inches (5.1 to 6.3 cm), making it the largest western Arctic. O. n. nevadensis is bright orange brown on the upper side of the wings. The dark brown wing margins are scalloped. Males have one to two black eyespots on the forewing; females have two to three. Males have a large, dark patch of sex scales on the forewing, extending from the basal area to near the apex. Females have dark scaling on the basal area of the forewing. Both sexes have a small eyespot near the hindwing tornus. The underside of the forewing is similar to the upper side. The ventral hindwing is uniformly striated dark brown and gray. Some populations have an irregular dark median band on the hindwing. The costa is whitish. O. n. gigas is slightly larger and darker than the nominate subspecies. O. n. iduna differs from the other two subspecies in having a much paler upperside.

== Distribution and habitat ==
The great Arctic is found almost exclusively in the Cascade Mountains, from southern British Columbia to northern California. O. n. gigas is found on the southern tip of Vancouver Island. O. n. iduna is found in northern coastal California. The great Arctic is found from sea level to 7,000 feet (2,100 m). Habitats include forest clearings, open pinewoods, gravel roads, meadows, slopes, and canyons. Along the coast, it is commonly found on bare mountain summits.

== Flight ==
The great Arctic is seen from early May to late September, but only every two years (mostly even numbered) due to its long life cycle. O. n. gigas is seen on odd numbered years.

== Life cycle ==
The whitish egg is oblong and flat topped. The caterpillar is tan with a black lateral dorsal stripe. The sides of the caterpillar are striped with brown, greenish brown, and white. The head lacks horns, and the posterior end of the abdomen is forked. The caterpillar overwinters partially grown in its first year, and overwinters in its second year as a fifth instar. The host plant for the great Arctic is unknown, but is believed to be in the family Poaceae.
