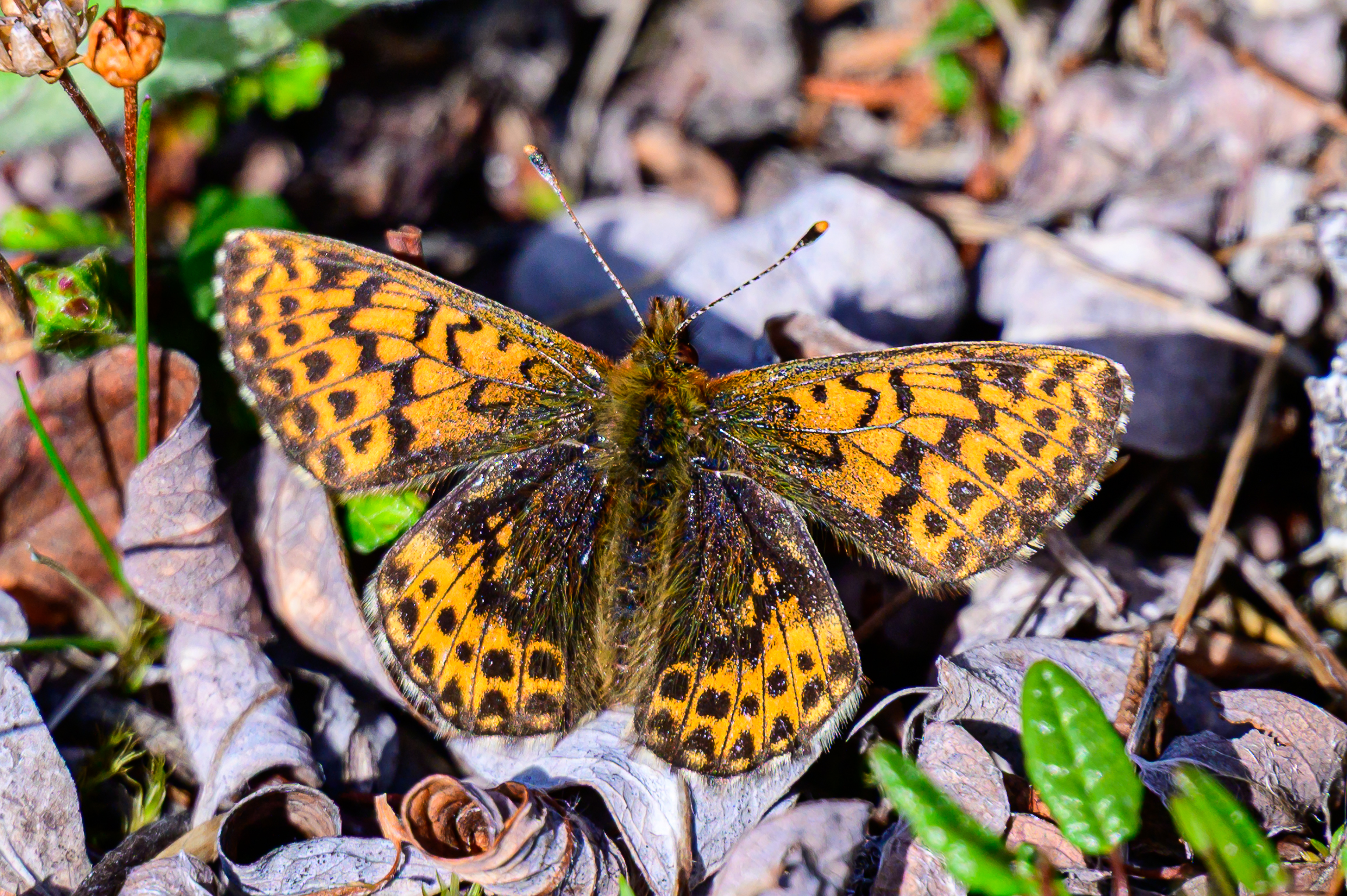

Scientific classification
- Kingdom: Animalia
- Phylum: Arthropoda
- Class: Insecta
- Order: Lepidoptera
- Family: Nymphalidae
- Genus: Boloria
- Species: B. polaris

Binomial name
- Boloria polaris Boisduval, 1828

= Boloria polaris =

Polaris fritillary

Species of butterfly

Boloria polaris, the Polaris fritillary, is a butterfly of the family Nymphalidae. It is found in northernmost Scandinavia, North America (in northeastern Alaska and northern Canada) and in Greenland. It is also found in northeastern Russia and across the Palearctic to Chukotka. It is one of only six butterfly species found on Canada's Ellesmere Island.

== Description ==
The wingspan is 32–38 mm. A. polaris Bsd. (71e). Similar to the preceding species [ freija], but more variable, the hindwing beneath more variegated, the black median band of the forewing above heavy, deep black, deeply sinuous proximally. In the marginal area regular rows of submarginal spots. The forewing beneath almost as distinctly marked with black as above, but paler. On the hindwing beneath the ground is marked with mother-of-pearl in the basal area and the narrow band which separates the central from the marginal area bears silvery teeth. —In Norway, Finland, Lapponia, in July and August. The butterfly flies from June to August depending on the location.

== Biology ==
The species is characterized by a two-year development. The flight time of butterflies is in late June - mid-July. Butterflies that live in the mountain tundra usually stay near rocky areas. In the meadow tundra, they often feed on astragalus ( Astragalus ), wild rosemary ( Ledum ), dryad ( Dryas ). Females lay eggs singly or in groups of up to 20 eggs on caterpillar food plants. The egg stage lasts just over two weeks. Caterpillars feed on flowers and leaves. They hibernate under stones or moss twice: after hatching and being at the fourth age. Before the first wintering, the caterpillars do not feed. Caterpillar food plants: Dryas octopetala ,'Vaccínium myrtíllus, Vaccínium uliginósum and Vaccinium sp.

== Subspecies ==
The following subspecies are recognized:

- Boloria polaris erda (central and eastern Siberia)
- Boloria polaris kurentzovi (Chukotka Autonomous Okrug and Wrangel island in Siberia)
- Boloria polaris polaris (northern Scandinavia, Greenland and North America)

== Etymology ==
Polaris (from Latin) - polar.
