= Yuri Korshunov =

Russian entomologist

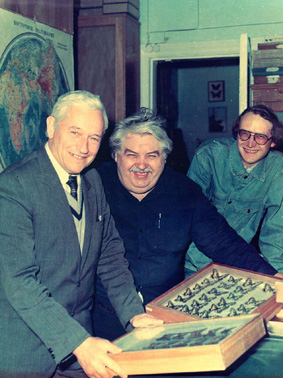
M.I.Falkovitsh, Yu.P.Korshunov and V.V.Dubatolov in Zoological Museum, Novosibirsk, December, 1988

Yuri Petrovich Korshunov (Russian: Юрий Петрович Коршунов; 22 September 1933, Chernorechka Village near Novosibirsk — 1 August 2002, Novosibirsk) was a Russian entomologist. He specialised in Lepidoptera. Korshunov worked at the Zoological Museum and the Institute of Systematics and Ecology of Animals (Siberian branch of the Russian Academy of Sciences) and a member of the Russian Entomological Society.

== Works ==
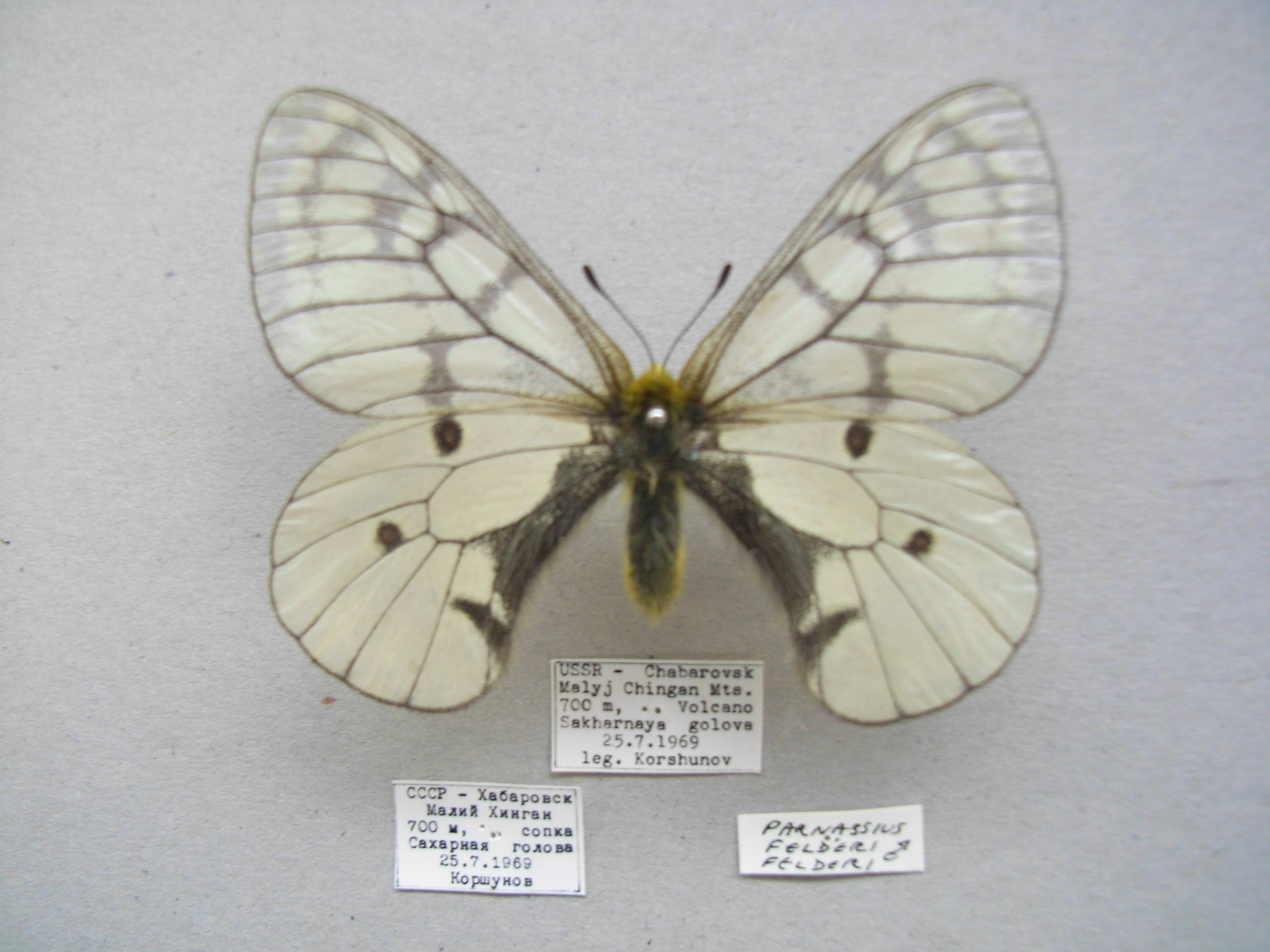
Specimen of Parnassius felderi collected by Yuri Korshunov. This is a mistake: in 1969 Yu.P.Korshunov collected butterflies in Khakasia; he never collected in Amur basin... He have received P. felderi specimens from Chulkov {a comment by V.V.Dubatolov}

Partial list of works byYuri Korshanov

- Butterflies of the Western Siberian Plain. A key (1985)
- A catalogue of Rhopalocera (Lepidoptera) of the USSR (1972)
- The Butterflies of Asian part of Russia (1995, co-author P. Gorbunov)
- Butterflies of the Urals, Siberia and Far East. Key and annotations (2000)
- Red Data Book of the Russian Federation (contributor)
