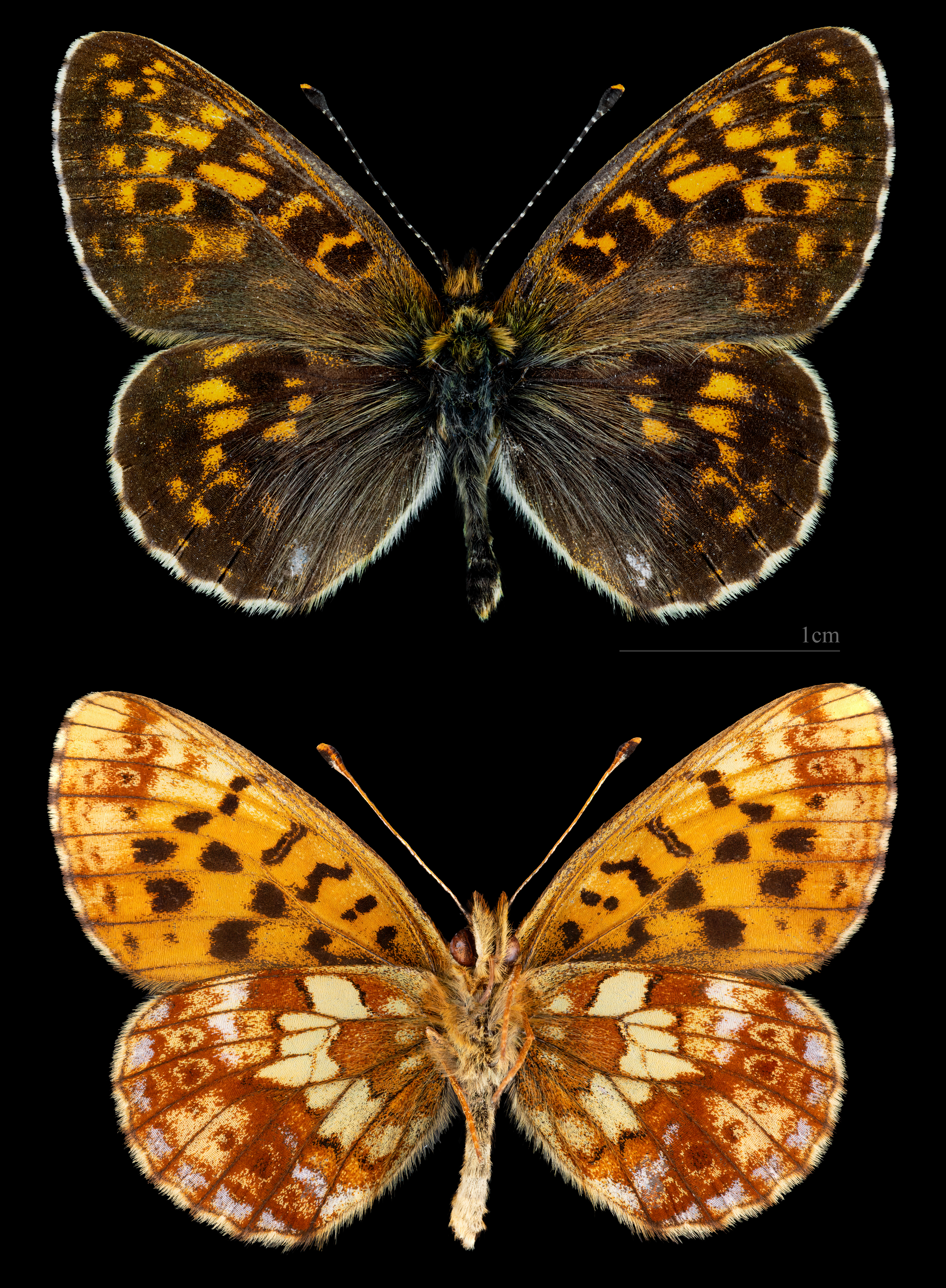

Scientific classification
- Domain: Eukaryota
- Kingdom: Animalia
- Phylum: Arthropoda
- Class: Insecta
- Order: Lepidoptera
- Family: Nymphalidae
- Genus: Boloria
- Species: B. thore

Binomial name
- Boloria thore (Hübner, 1803)

Synonyms
- Clossiana thore

= Boloria thore =

Thor's fritillary

Species of butterfly

Boloria thore, the Thor's fritillary, is a butterfly of the family Nymphalidae. It occurs in damp places in the Alps, Fennoscandia, the south of European Russia, the Urals and east across the Palearctic to Siberia and Japan.

The wingspan is 28–34 mm. Seitz - A. thore Hbn. (68e). The nymotypical form of this species is easily recognized by the prevalence of black on the upperside. This colour predominates to such a degree as in other species is only the case in melanistic aberrations. Also the ground-colour of the underside is duller than in all the other Argynnis, the hindwing varying from dark brick-red to cinnamon-brown, only the median band being dark yellow. In the Alps, but at moderates heights in the forest region, not above 6000 ft. Also in the high North, Scandinavia and Finland. Northern specimens on the whole paler than alpine ones.

== Biology ==
The species produces one generation every two years.

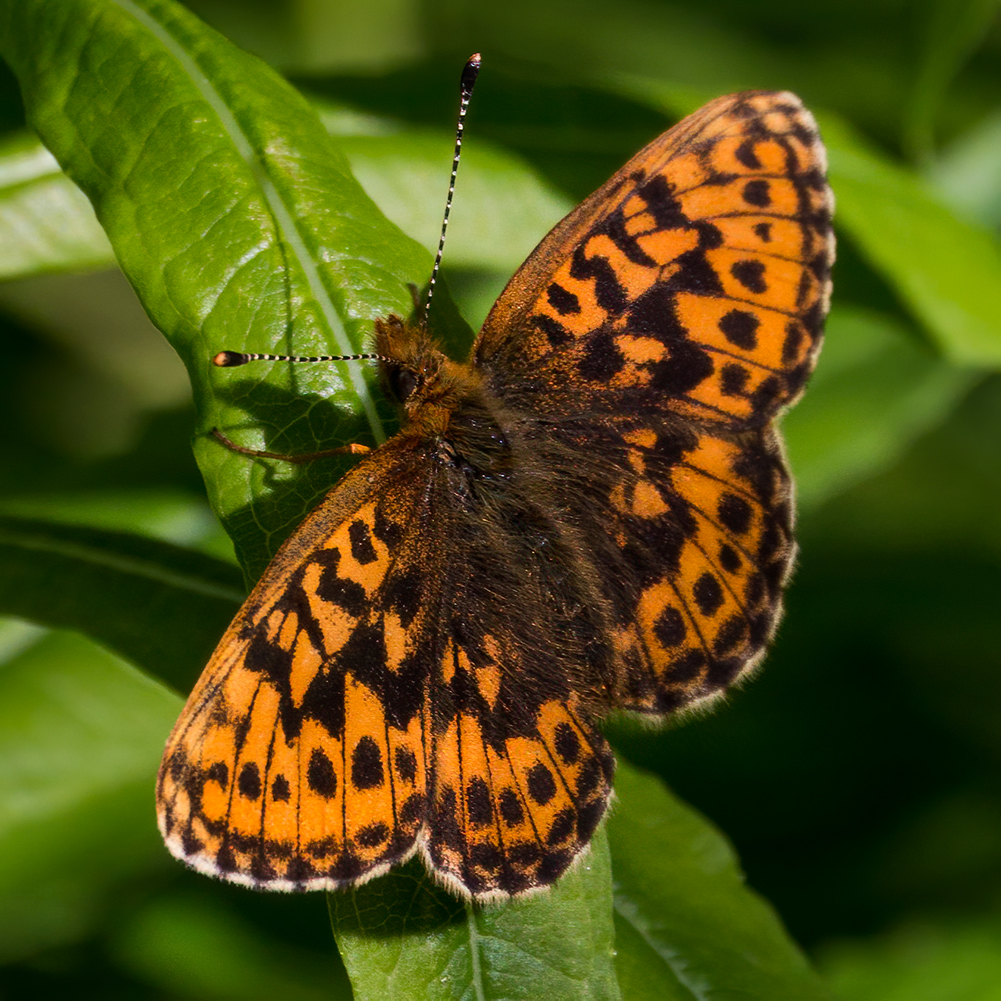
Boloria thore in Abisko, Sweden. Aperture f/10.0, shutter speed 1/800 and ISO 320.

Larvae feed on species of Viola.

== Etymology ==
The Latin specific epithet comes from the name Thor (ancient Germanic and Scandinavian mythology) - the god of thunder, storms and fertility, protecting gods and people from giants and monsters.
