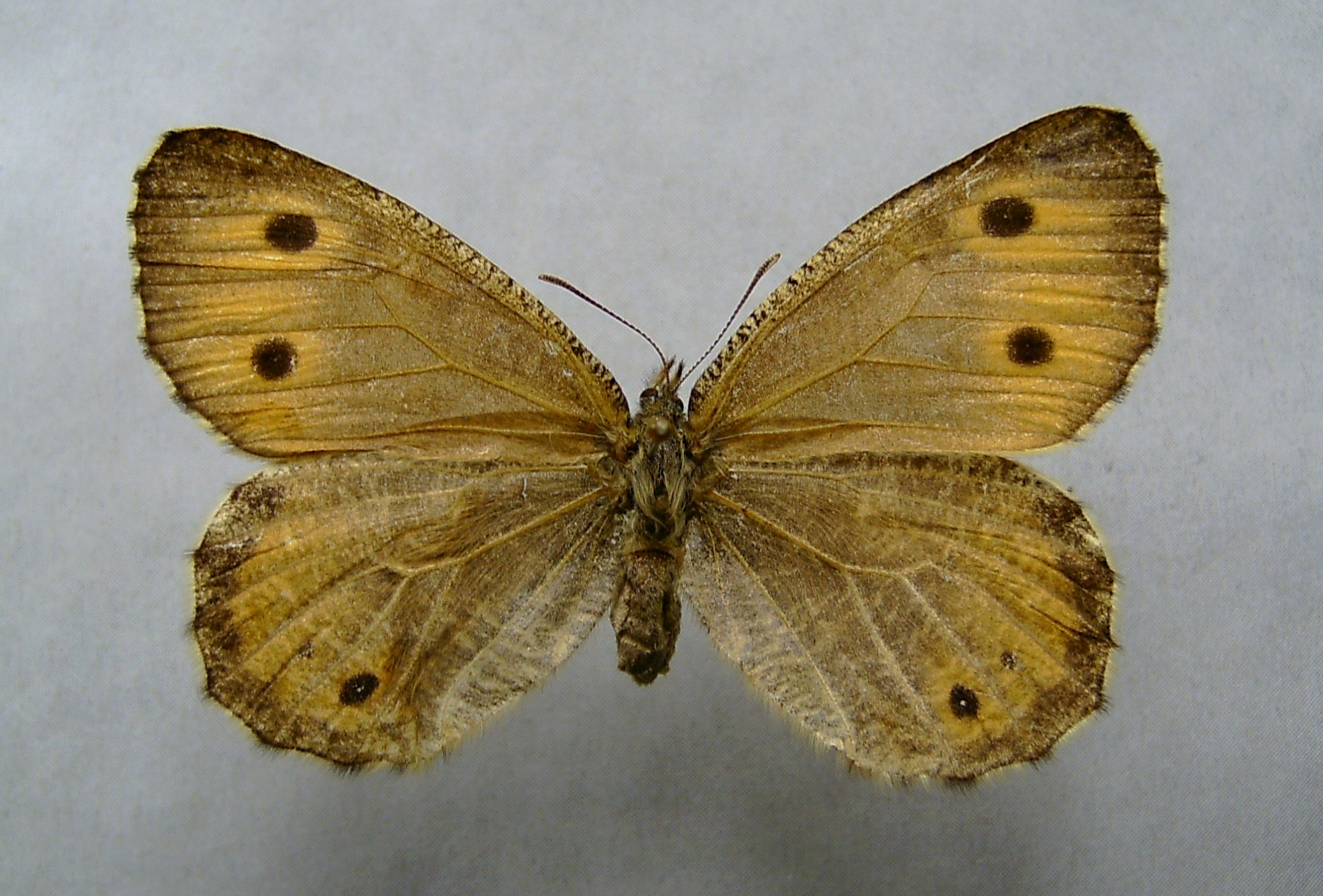
- Alpine grayling (Oeneis glacialis)

Scientific classification
- Kingdom: Animalia
- Phylum: Arthropoda
- Clade: Pancrustacea
- Class: Insecta
- Order: Lepidoptera
- Family: Nymphalidae
- Subtribe: Satyrina
- Genus: Oeneis; Hübner, 1819

Synonyms
- Chionobas Boisduval, [1832]

= Oeneis =

Genus of butterflies

Oeneis (the Arctics or graylings) is a butterfly genus of the Satyrinae. All but one of its members are Arctic, sub-Arctic or high-altitude alpine in distribution. Some of the members of the genus are among the butterflies that can get along in the harshest climates of any butterflies. Four species in Europe, more are found in Arctic Russia, Siberia, Mongolia, Arctic North America and the Rocky Mountains. There are no observations from Greenland. The development of most species takes two years.

== Species ==
Listed alphabetically within groups:

The jutta species group:

- Oeneis fulla (Eversmann, 1851)
- Oeneis jutta (Hübner, 1805–1806) – Baltic grayling or Jutta Arctic
- Oeneis magna (Graeser, 1888)
- Oeneis melissa (Fabricius, 1775) – Melissa Arctic
- Oeneis tunga (Staudinger, 1894)

The norna species group:

- Oeneis actaeoides (Lukhtanov, 1989)
- Oeneis glacialis (Moll, 1785) – Alpine grayling
- Oeneis norna (Thunberg, 1791) – Norse grayling
- Oeneis philipi Troubridge, 1988
- Oeneis polixenes (Fabricius, 1775) – Polixenes Arctic
- Oeneis rosovi (Kurentzov 1960) – Philip's Arctic

The alpina species group:

- Oeneis alpina (Kurentzov, 1970) – sentinel Arctic

The hora species group:

- Oeneis aktashi (Lukhtanov, 1984)
- Oeneis ammosovi (Dubatov & Korshunov, 1988)
- Oeneis elwesi (Staudinger, 1901)
- Oeneis hora (Grum-Grshimailo, 1888)
- Oeneis mulla (Staudinger, 1881)

The bore species group:

- Oeneis alberta (Elwes, 1893) – Alberta Arctic
- Oeneis ammon (Elwes, 1899)
- Oeneis bore (Schneider, 1792) – Arctic grayling or white-veined Arctic
- Oeneis chryxus (Doubleday, 1849) – brown Arctic or chryxus Arctic
- Oeneis ivallda (Mead, 1878) – California Arctic
- Oeneis nevadensis (C. & R. Felder, 1866) – great Arctic
- Oeneis macounii (Edwards, 1885) – Canada Arctic or Macoun's Arctic
- Oeneis tanana (Warren & Nakahara 2016)

The tarpeja species group:

- Oeneis diluta (Lukhtanov, 1994)
- Oeneis lederi (Alphéraky, 1897)
- Oeneis mongolica (Oberthür, 1876)
- Oeneis sculda (Eversmann, 1851)
- Oeneis tarpeja (Pallas, 1771)
- Oeneis uhleri (Reakirt, 1866) – Uhler's Arctic
- Oeneis urda (Eversmann, 1847)

The buddha species group:

- Oeneis buddha (Grum-Grshimailo, 1891)
- Oeneis oeno (Boisduval, 1832)
