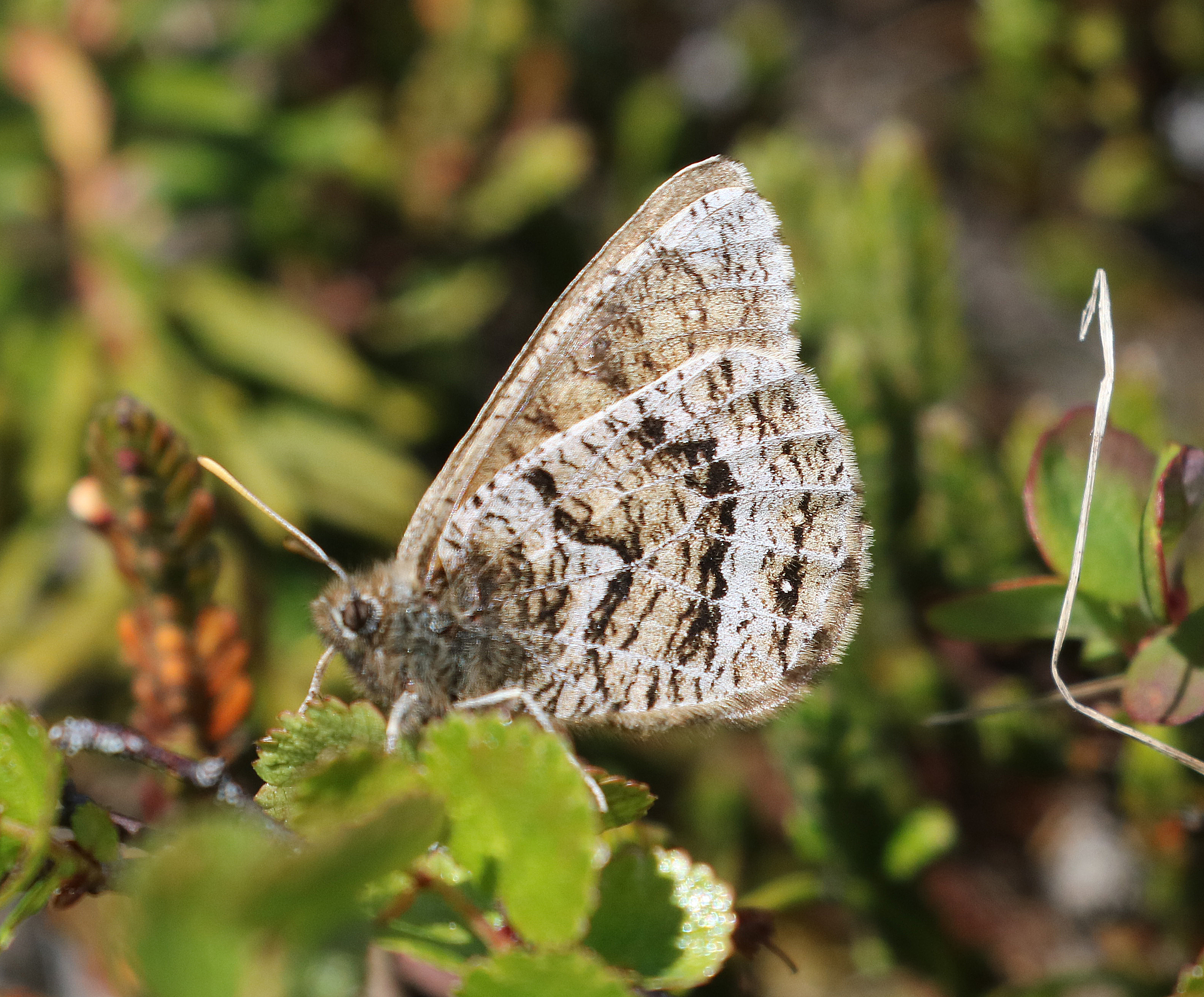

Conservation status
- Least Concern (IUCN 3.1)

Scientific classification
- Kingdom: Animalia
- Phylum: Arthropoda
- Clade: Pancrustacea
- Class: Insecta
- Order: Lepidoptera
- Family: Nymphalidae
- Genus: Oeneis
- Species group: Oeneis (bore)
- Species: O. bore

Binomial name
- Oeneis bore (Schneider, 1792)

Subspecies
- See text

Synonyms
- Papilio bore Schneider, 1792; Oeneis norna bore Hübner, 1825; Oeneis verdanda Staudinger, 1898; Oeneis semidea var. pansa Christoph, 1893; Oeneis arasaguna Austaut, 1911; Oeneis mckinleyensis dos Passos, 1949; Oeneis taygete Geyer, [1830]; Oeneis bootes Boisduval, 1832; Oeneis taygete gaspeensis dos Passos, 1949; Oeneis taygete fordi dos Passos, 1949; Oeneis taygete edwardsi dos Passos, 1949; Oeneis patrushevae Korshunov, 1985

= Oeneis bore =

Species of butterfly

Oeneis bore, the white-veined Arctic or Arctic grayling, is a butterfly, a species of Satyrinae that occurs in North America and Asia.

== Description ==
The wingspan is 37 to 49 mm. The dorsal view is a dull greyish brown while the females are often tawny. Males have a dark grey node in the centre of the forewing.

== Subspecies ==
Listed alphabetically:

- O. b. arasaguna Austaut, 1911 – eastern Sayan, Transbaikalia?
- O. b. bore – Arctic Europe, Arctic Siberia
- O. b. edwardsi dos Passos, 1949 – southern Alberta, southern British Columbia, Montana, Wyoming, Colorado
- O. b. fordi dos Passos, 1949 – south western Alaska
- O. b. gaspeensis dos Passos, 1949 – southern Quebec
- O. b. hanburyi Watkins, 1928 – Yukon, Northwest Territories, British Columbia, northern Manitoba
- O. b. mckinleyensis dos Passos, 1949 – Alaska
- O. b. pansa Christoph, 1893 – Yakutia, Magadan
- ?O. b. patrushevae Korshunov, 1985 - Siberian tundra
- O. b. taygete Geyer, [1830] – Labrador, northern Quebec – white-veined Arctic

== Similar species ==
- Melissa Arctic (O. mellisa)
- Polixenes Arctic (O. polixenes)

== Range and habitat ==
Occurs from Lapland and northern Russia and across Arctic Canada from Labrador to British Columbia; also found in the Gaspé Peninsula, western Alberta and the US Rocky Mountain states. Its habitats include grassy alpine slopes, tundra, taiga, and subarctic bogs.

=== Larval foods ===
Sedges (e.g., Carex misandra) and oviposition has been observed on dead leaves of grasses (Festuca mibra, Festuca brachyphylla, and Festuca vivipara).

=== Adult foods ===
- Nectar
