= Cupido carswelli =

Scientific classification
- Domain: Eukaryota
- Kingdom: Animalia
- Phylum: Arthropoda
- Class: Insecta
- Order: Lepidoptera
- Family: Lycaenidae
- Genus: Cupido
- Species: C. carswelli

Binomial name
- Cupido carswelli Stempffer, 1927

Species of butterfly

Cupido carswelli is a small butterfly found in the West Palearctic that belongs to the blues family. It is endemic to Spain. Cupido carswelli was described by Henri Stempffer as a form of Cupido minimus. The taxonomic status of the taxon carswelli is still unclear: depending on the sources, it is considered either a species in its own right or a subspecies of Cupido minimus, as at the time of its description. A recent morphometric analysis suggests that both taxa are conspecific, while a molecular barcoding study supports the opposite viewpoint, making carswelli appear to be closer to Cupido lorquinii (another species present in the Iberian Peninsula) than Cupido minimus sensu stricto. More in-depth molecular analyzes are considered necessary to resolve the relationship between these three closely related taxa.

- Images representing Cupido carswellii at Consortium for the Barcode of Life

== Effect of Climate Change on Population ==
Current research indicates that the population of Cupido carswelli is declining due to climate change.

== See also ==
- List of butterflies of Europe
