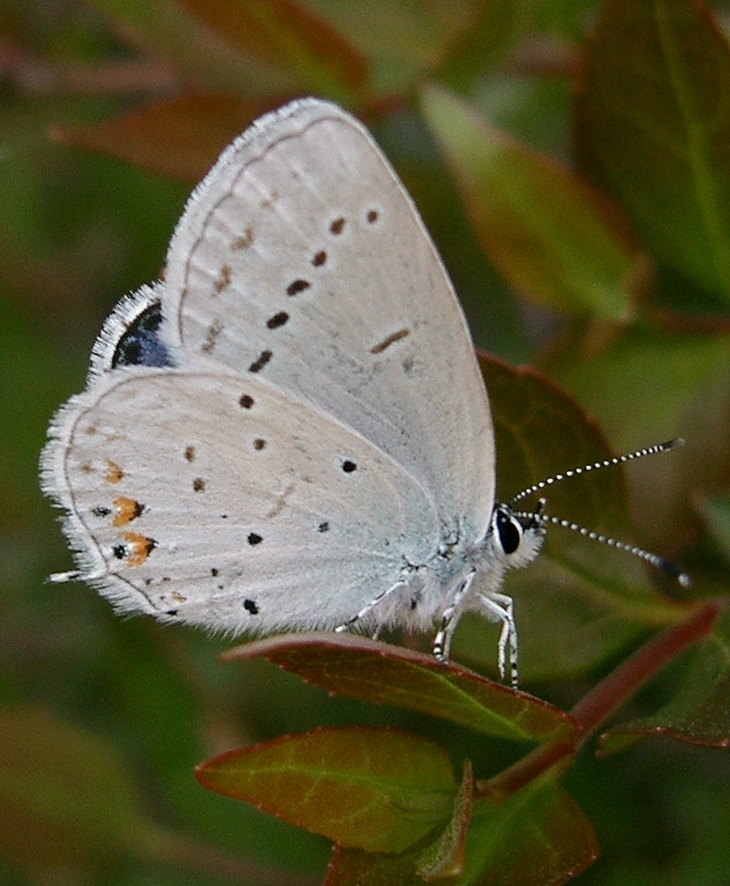

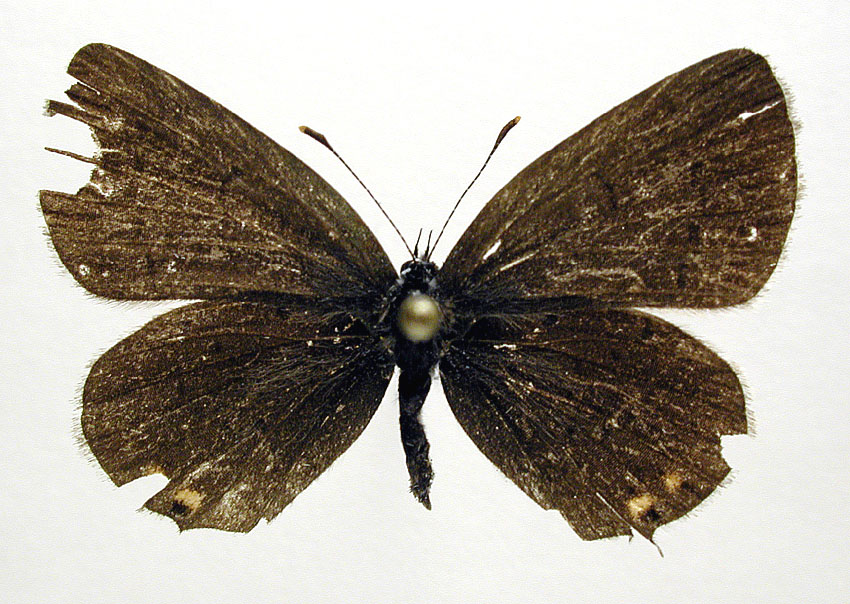

Scientific classification
- Kingdom: Animalia
- Phylum: Arthropoda
- Clade: Pancrustacea
- Class: Insecta
- Order: Lepidoptera
- Family: Lycaenidae
- Genus: Cupido
- Species: C. argiades

Binomial name
- Cupido argiades (Pallas, 1771)

Synonyms
- Everes argiades; Papilio argiades; Elkalyce argiades

= Short-tailed blue =

Species of butterfly

The short-tailed blue or tailed Cupid (Cupido argiades) is a butterfly that forms part of the family Lycaenidae. It is found from Europe to Japan and in India.

== Description ==
The male has a violet upperside, a violet forewing with brown edging, and a violet hindwing with a brown edging of varying length. The wings have black spots, some of which have slight white edging. The tail is black with a white tip. The underside of the wings are white or brownish grey, the markings prominent or very faint. The antennae are black with white speckling on the shafts. The body is brown with a purple flush on fresh specimens.

The female has a dark grey-blue upperside, with black parts and broader edging. The undersides of the wings are like those of the male but with more stark markings. The body is like that of the male but without the purple flush.

Specimens from very dry localities in Upper Burma and from Great Nicobar Island are remarkably small and pale, with the markings on the underside, especially the subtornal ochraceous yellow patch, more or less obsolescent.

== Similar species ==
- Southern short-tailed blue (Cupido alcetas ), southern Europe
- Eastern short-tailed blue ( Cupido decolorata )

== Distribution ==
In the Palearctic it is found from north of Spain via Central Europe, Southern Europe and Eastern Europe then east to Central Asia and Japan. It is missing in much of Italy and the south of Greece and Turkey. The butterfly flies from May to September depending on the location. An isolated population in Southern Armenia is on wing starting from late April. In the Oriental region it is found in India.

== Habitat ==
From sea level up to a height of about 1500 meters in meadows, forest edge habitats, woodland clearings and glades but only where there is with flower cover.

== Life cycle ==
The larva is light green with a dark stripe on the back and dark streaks on the sides, with some brownish and white spots. It feeds on legume plants, including Lotus uliginosus. Lotus corniculatus, Lotus pedunculatus, Securigera varia, Medicago sativa, Trifolium pratense, Astragalus glycyphyllosandUlex europaeus

The pupa is the same color as the larva or darker and black-spotted.

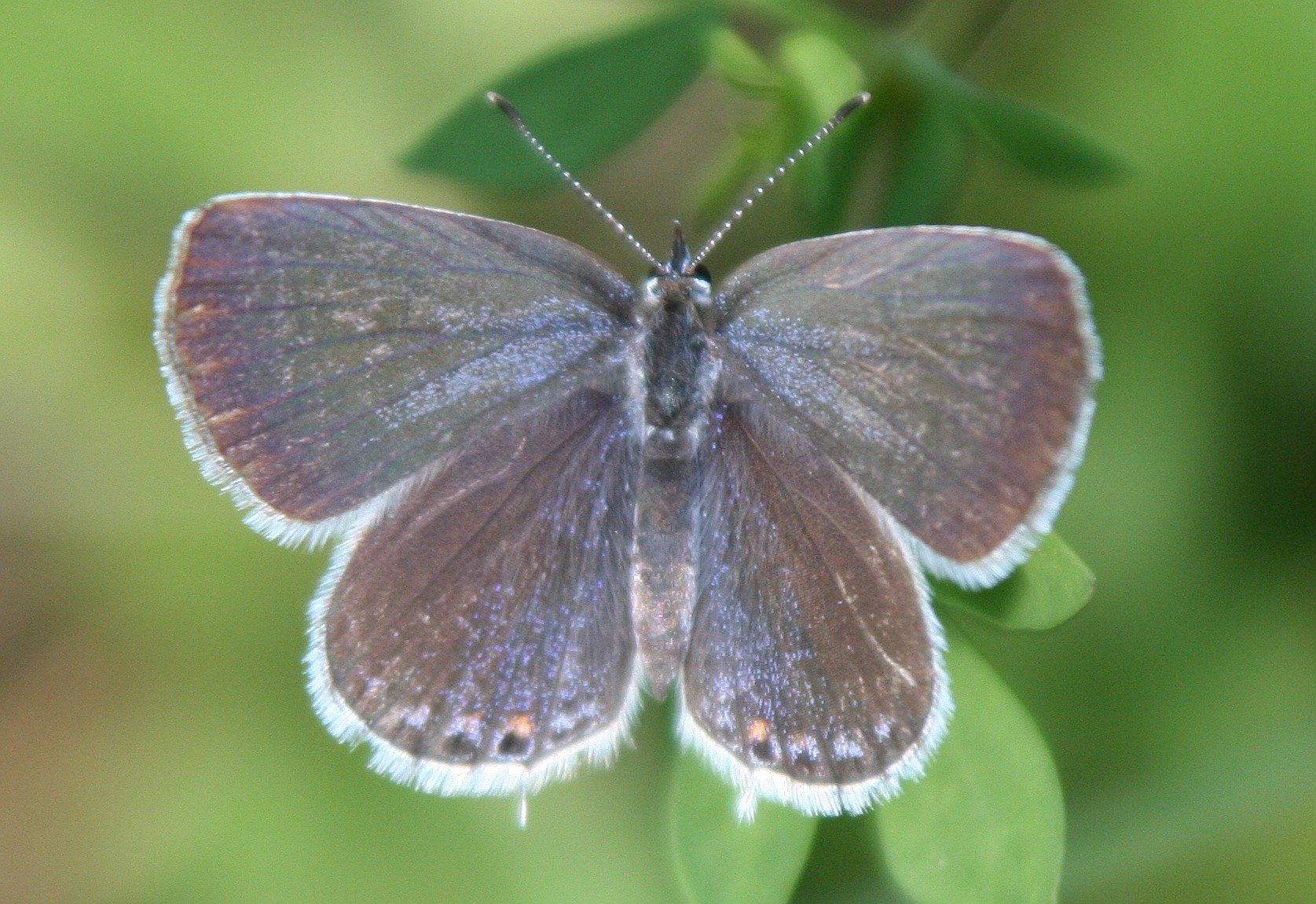
Female

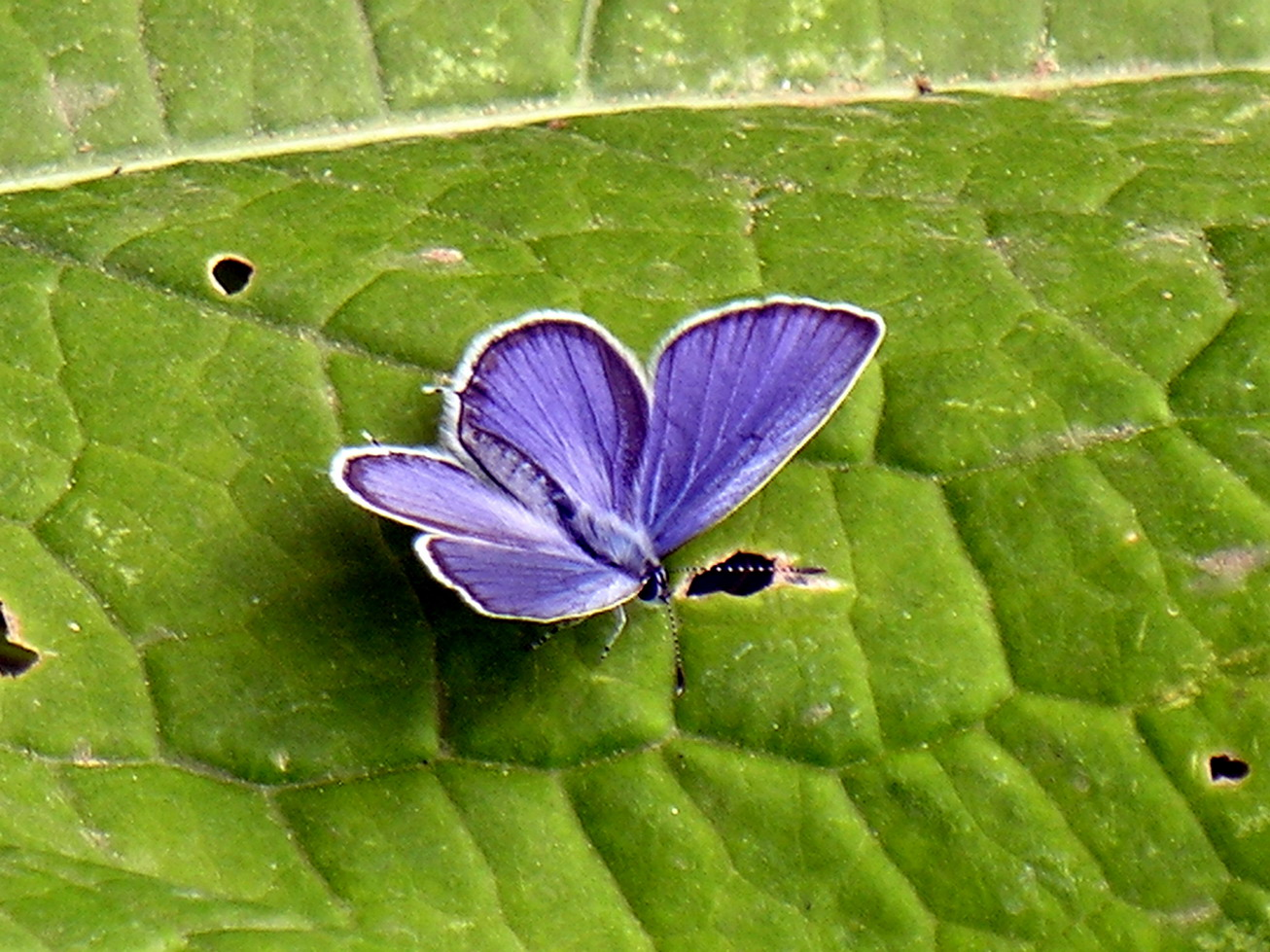
Male

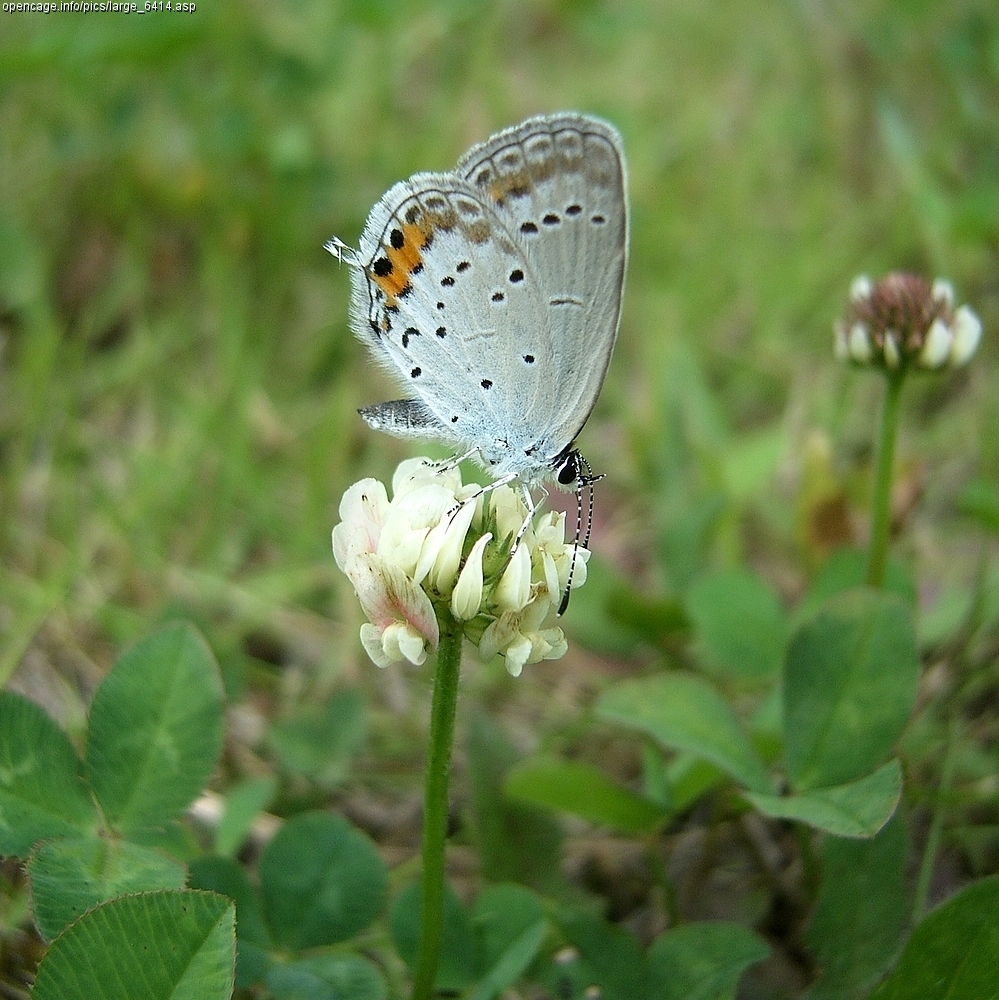

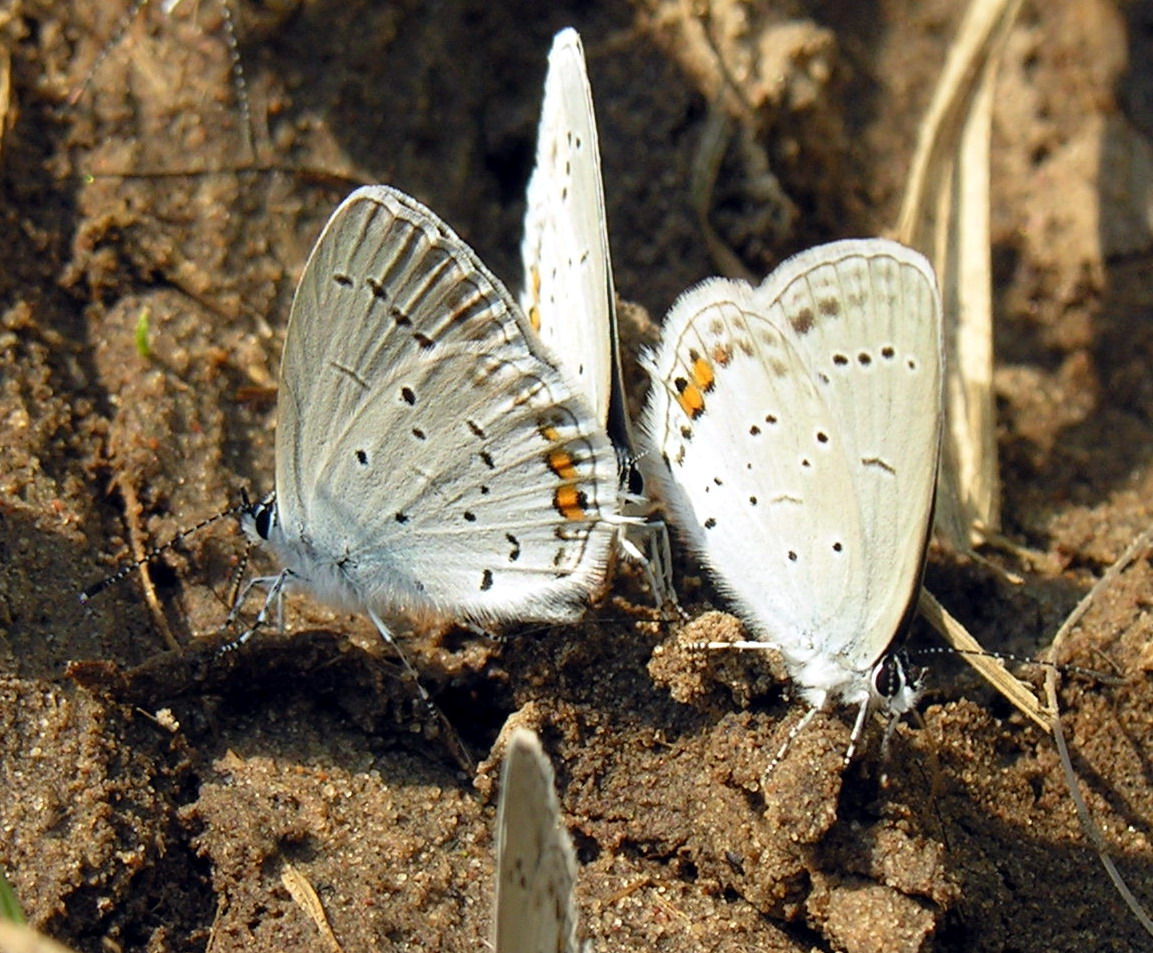

== See also ==
- Lycaenidae
- List of butterflies of India
- List of butterflies of India (Lycaenidae)
