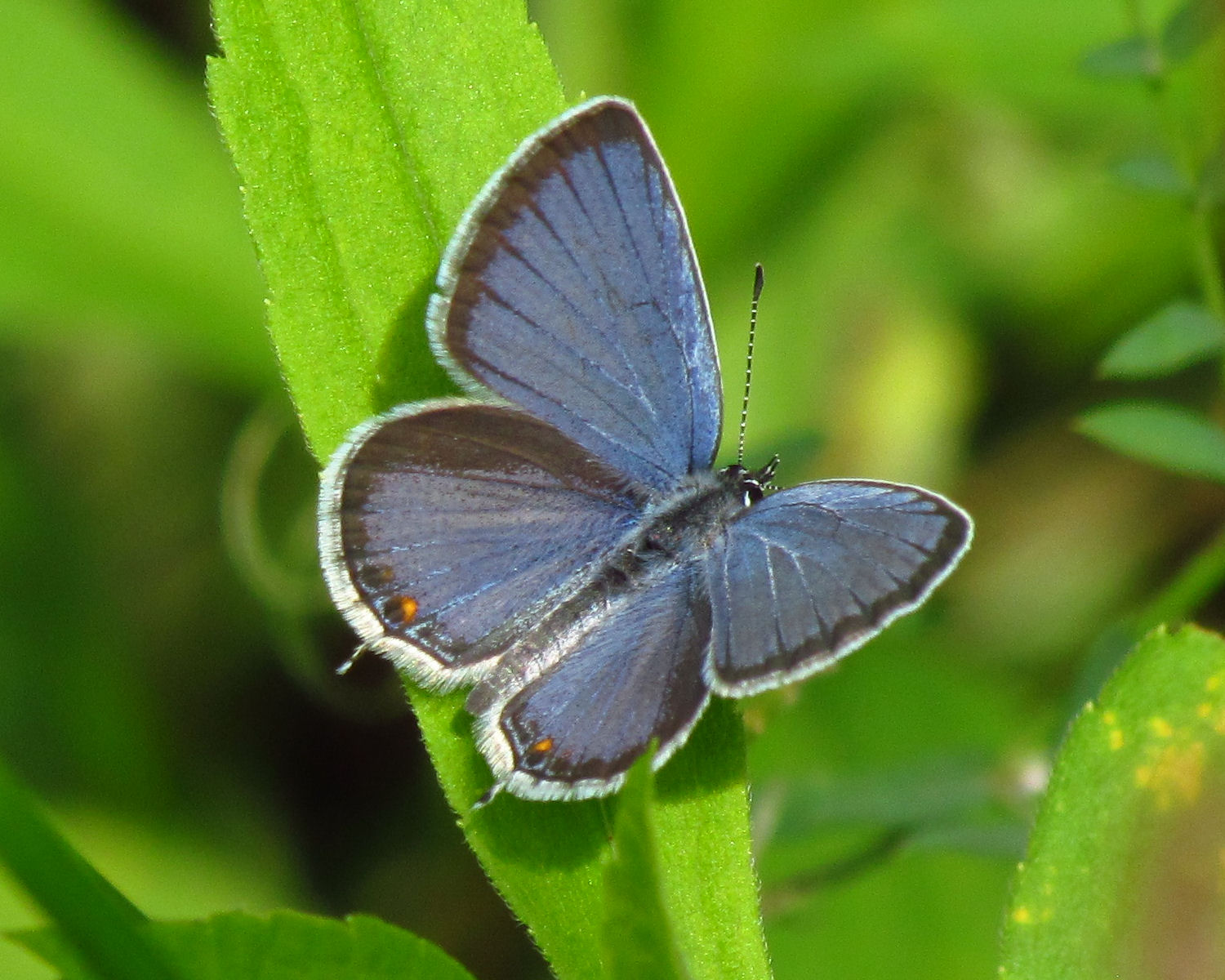
- Male
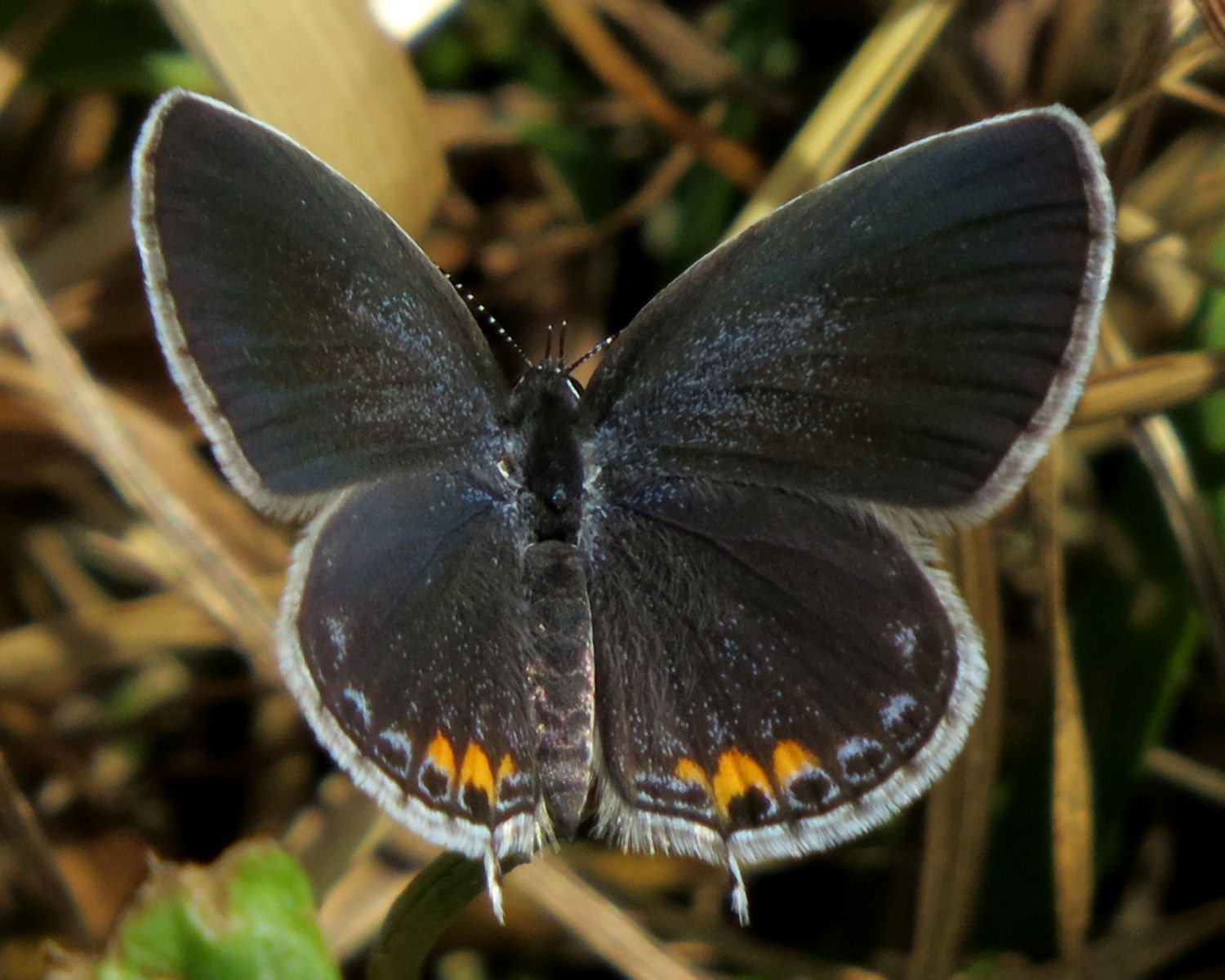
- Female

Conservation status
- Secure (NatureServe)

Scientific classification
- Domain: Eukaryota
- Kingdom: Animalia
- Phylum: Arthropoda
- Class: Insecta
- Order: Lepidoptera
- Family: Lycaenidae
- Genus: Cupido
- Species: C. comyntas

Binomial name
- Cupido comyntas (Godart, [1824])

Synonyms
- Polyommatus comyntas; Everes comyntas; Lycaena comyntas

= Eastern tailed-blue =

Species of butterfly

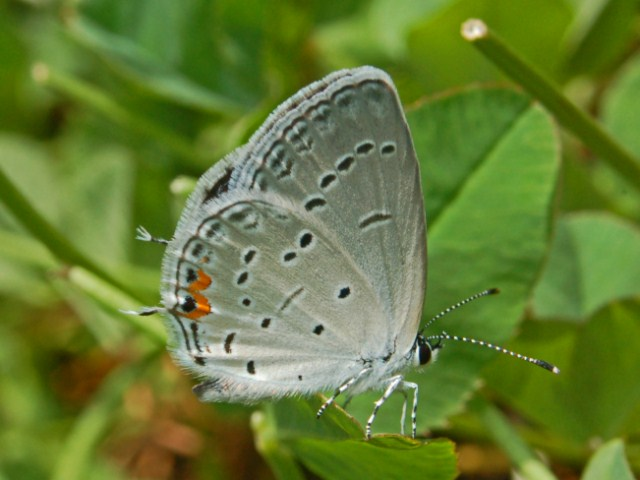
Ventral view

The eastern tailed-blue or eastern tailed blue (Cupido comyntas), also known as Everes comyntas, is a common butterfly of eastern North America. It is a small butterfly that is distinguished from other blues in its range by the small thin tail.

== Description ==
Males are blue on the upperside of their wings while females are lighter blue to brown or charcoal in coloring, but there are also varieties of purple and pink found in both sexes. The underside coloration ranges from bluish white to tan. There are two or three (outermost one often faint) black to orange chevron-shaped spots on the rear of the hindwings and a trailing tail off the innermost of the spots. The butterfly is 21 to 29 mm (0.83 to 1.14 in) wide with wings outstretched and slightly shorter in length.

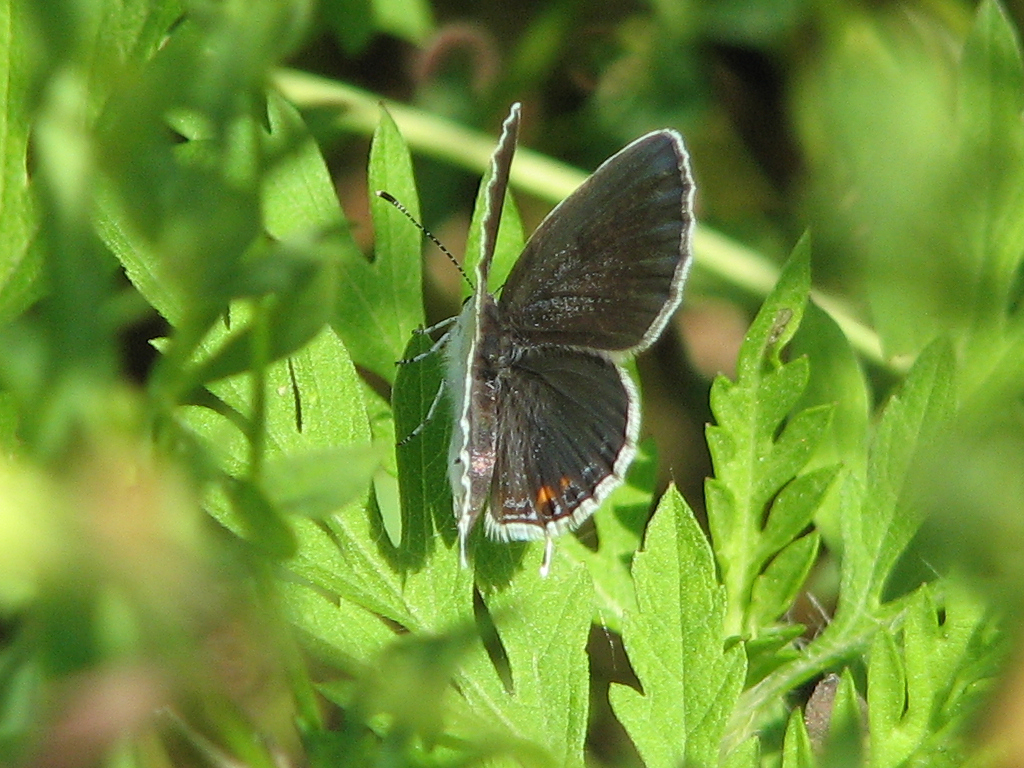
Female

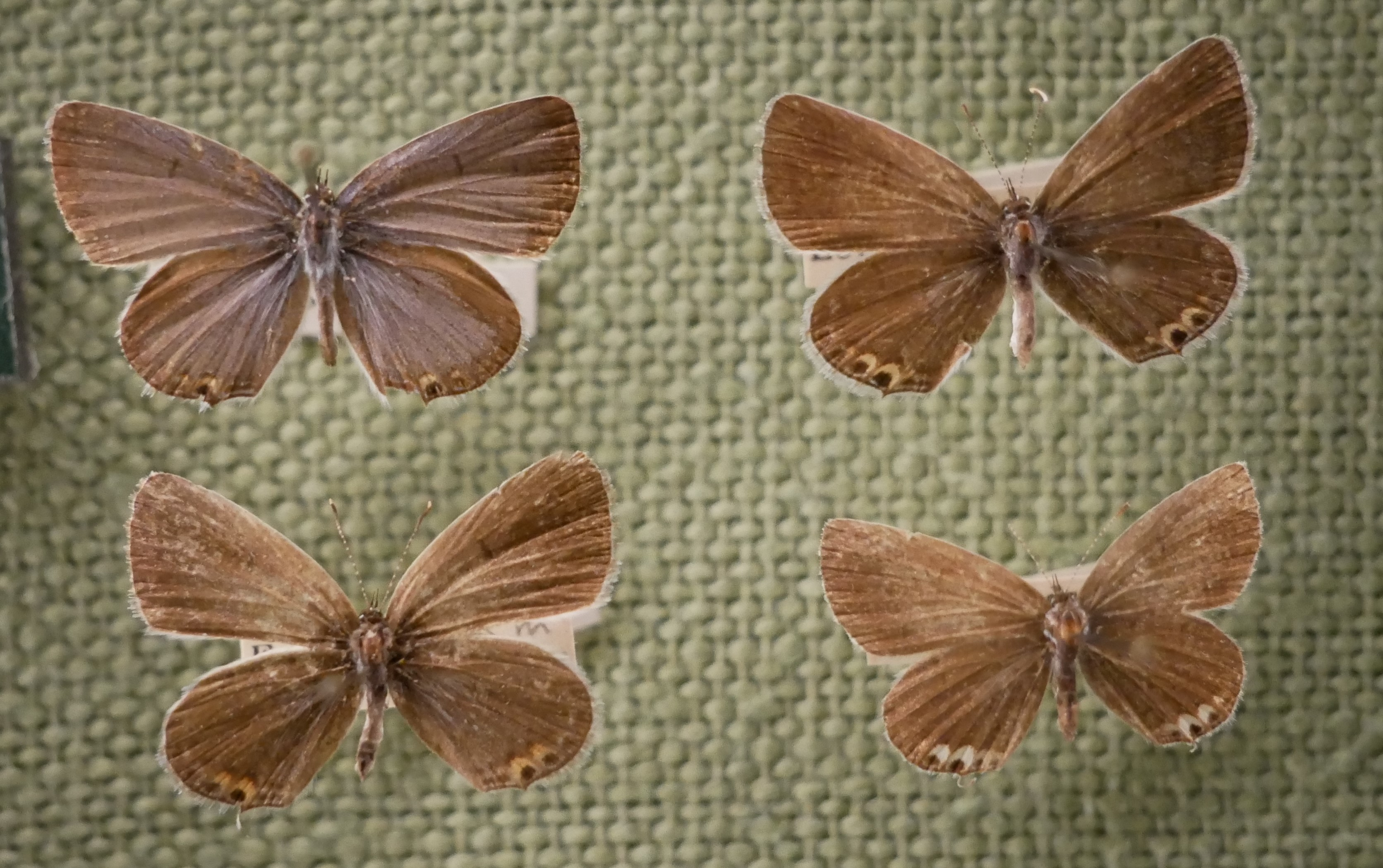
Cupido comyntas museum specimens

Eastern tailed-blue larvae feed on various legumes and are known to secrete a substance which is favored by some ant species. The ant in turn protects the larva of the butterfly from other predators.

== Range ==
The butterfly is common across eastern North America, and is found as far south as Central America. The Great Plains form a habitat boundary between the eastern and the much less common but similar western tailed-blue butterfly. The central section of California and portions of the states of Oregon and Washington also has eastern tailed blues, which likely adapted to the habitat after being brought there inadvertently by man. The species is virtually absent from the Rocky Mountain region. It is often found in sunny open habitat.

== Host plants ==
The caterpillars feed on the seeds and flowers, and sometimes the leaves, of various legumes, including vetches and clover.
