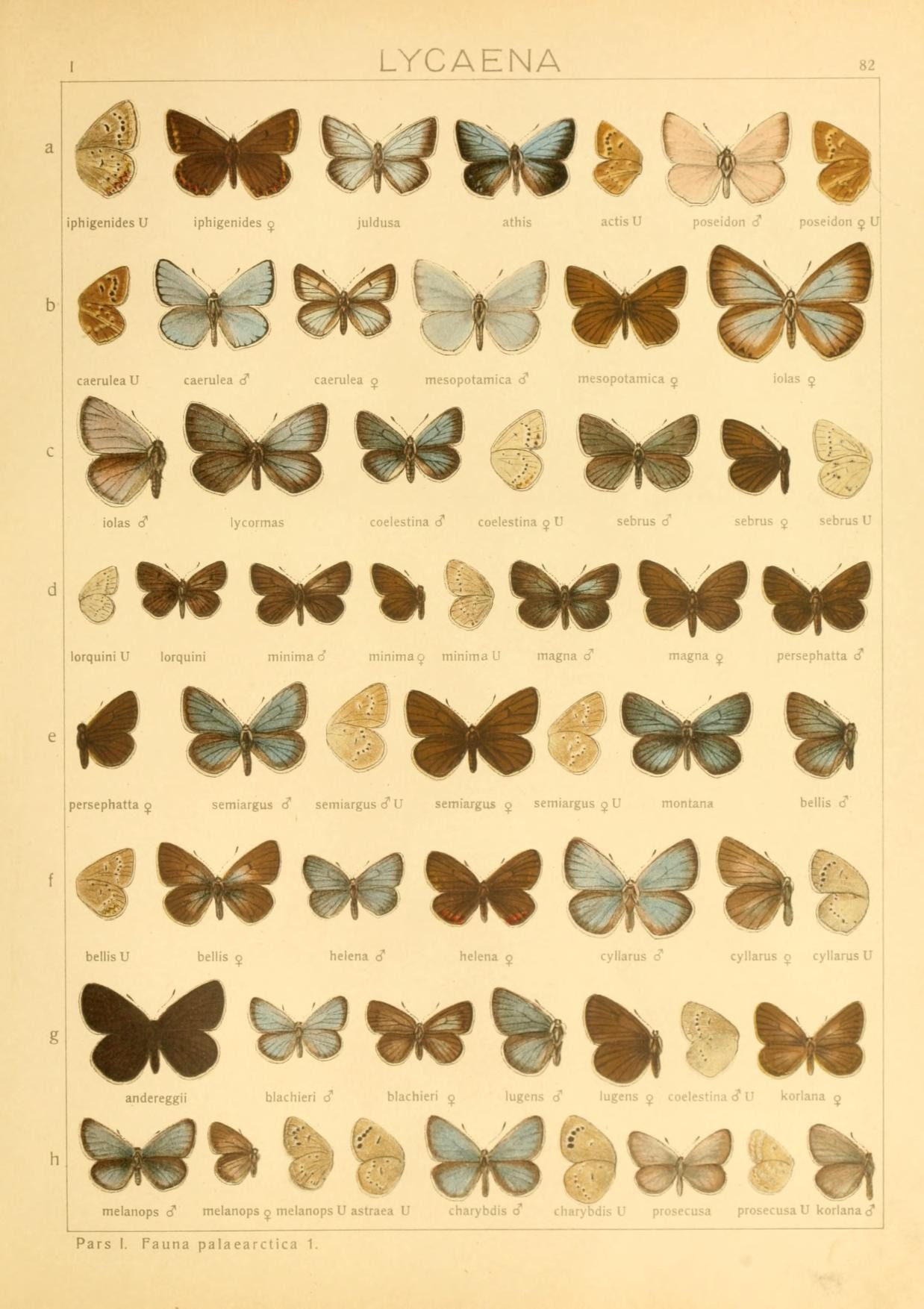

Scientific classification
- Domain: Eukaryota
- Kingdom: Animalia
- Phylum: Arthropoda
- Class: Insecta
- Order: Lepidoptera
- Family: Lycaenidae
- Genus: Cupido
- Species: C. lorquinii

Binomial name
- Cupido lorquinii (Herrich-Schäffer, 1847)

= Cupido lorquinii =

Species of butterfly

Cupido lorquinii is a small butterfly found in the West Palearctic (North Africa, Iberia) that belongs to the blues family.

== Description from Seitz ==
C. lorquinii H.-Schaff. (82 d) resembles minima very much and has been considered a form of it. But Butler draws attention to the differences between them, lorquinii having the wing-bases above dusted with purplish violet instead of blue-green. The ocelli of the underside are differently arranged, the submarginal row being much more regular and more evenly curved in lorqiiinii. In South France, Spain and the opposite districts of North Africa. — A very large form of this species, as large as or larger than Lyc. sebrus, is described from Central Asia; this is buddhista Alph. from the Tian-shan [now full species Cupido buddhista (Alphéraky, 1881)

- Images representing Cupido lorquinii at Consortium for the Barcode of Life

== Biology ==
The larva feeds on Anthyllis vulneraria. The habitat is hot dry places with flowers amongst scrub or trees.

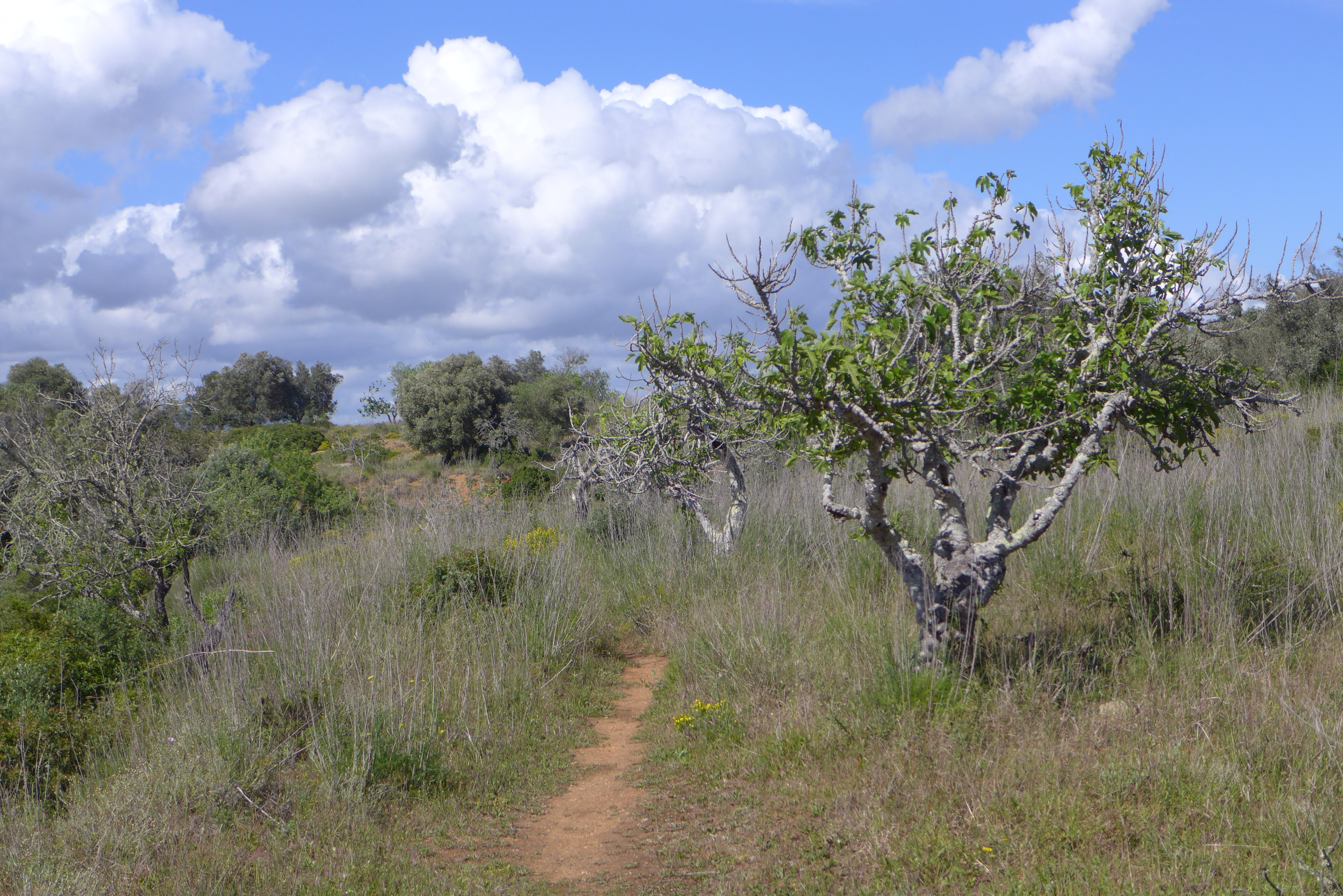
Habitat.Portugal

== See also ==
- List of butterflies of Europe
