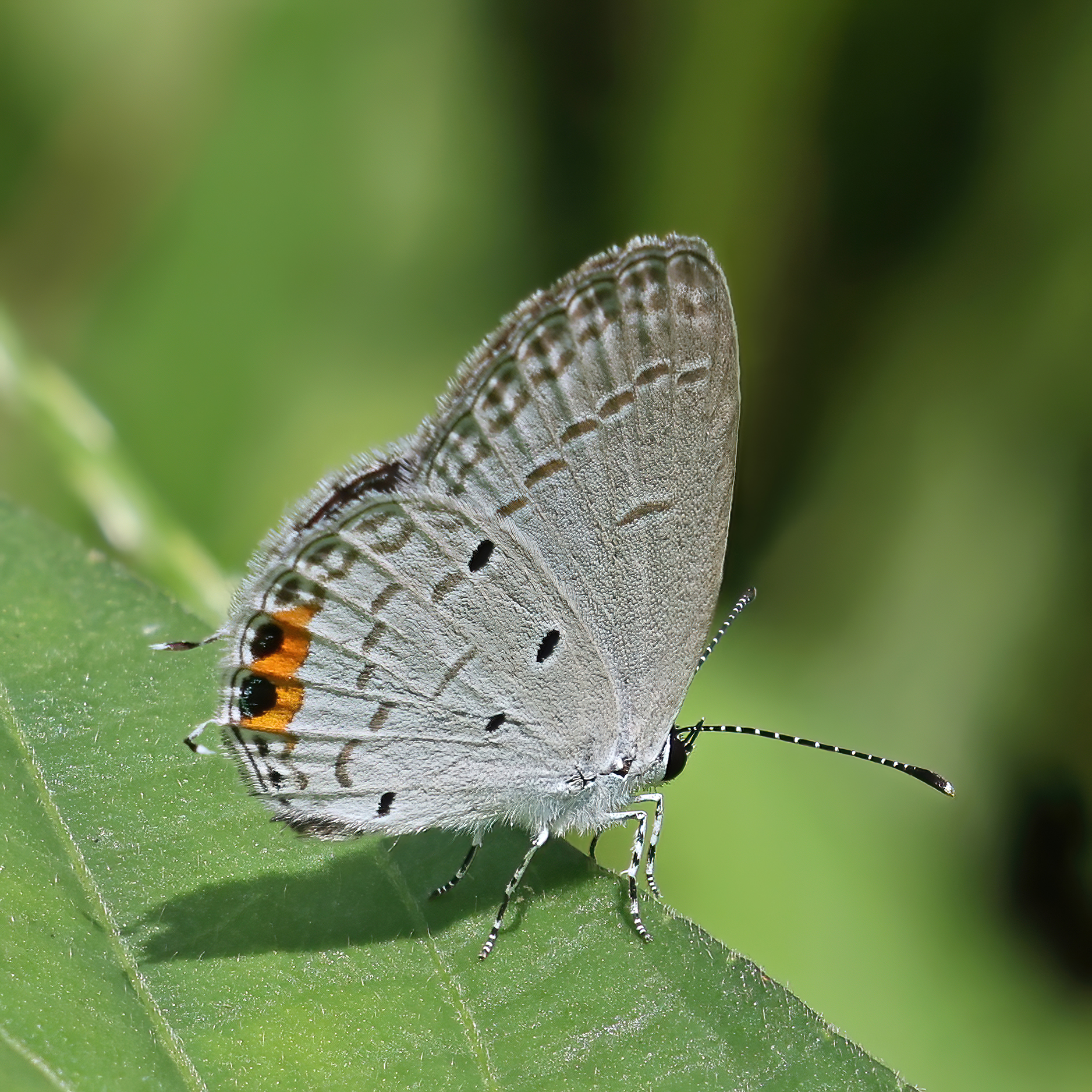
- In Sri Lanka

Scientific classification
- Domain: Eukaryota
- Kingdom: Animalia
- Phylum: Arthropoda
- Class: Insecta
- Order: Lepidoptera
- Family: Lycaenidae
- Genus: Cupido
- Species: C. lacturnus

Binomial name
- Cupido lacturnus (Godart, [1824])

= Cupido lacturnus =

Indian Cupid

Species of butterfly

Cupido lacturnus, the Indian Cupid, is a small butterfly found in the Australasian and Indomalayan realms that belongs to the lycaenids or blues family.

== Description ==
Harry Tytler described C. l. assamica in 1915 as:

Male. Upperside: Compared to Chilades parrhasius, black border much broader on both wings. Female. Upperside: the discal greyish-blue patch on forewing much reduced, darker and hardly visible; hindwing rather darker. Underside: similar.

— Harry Tytler

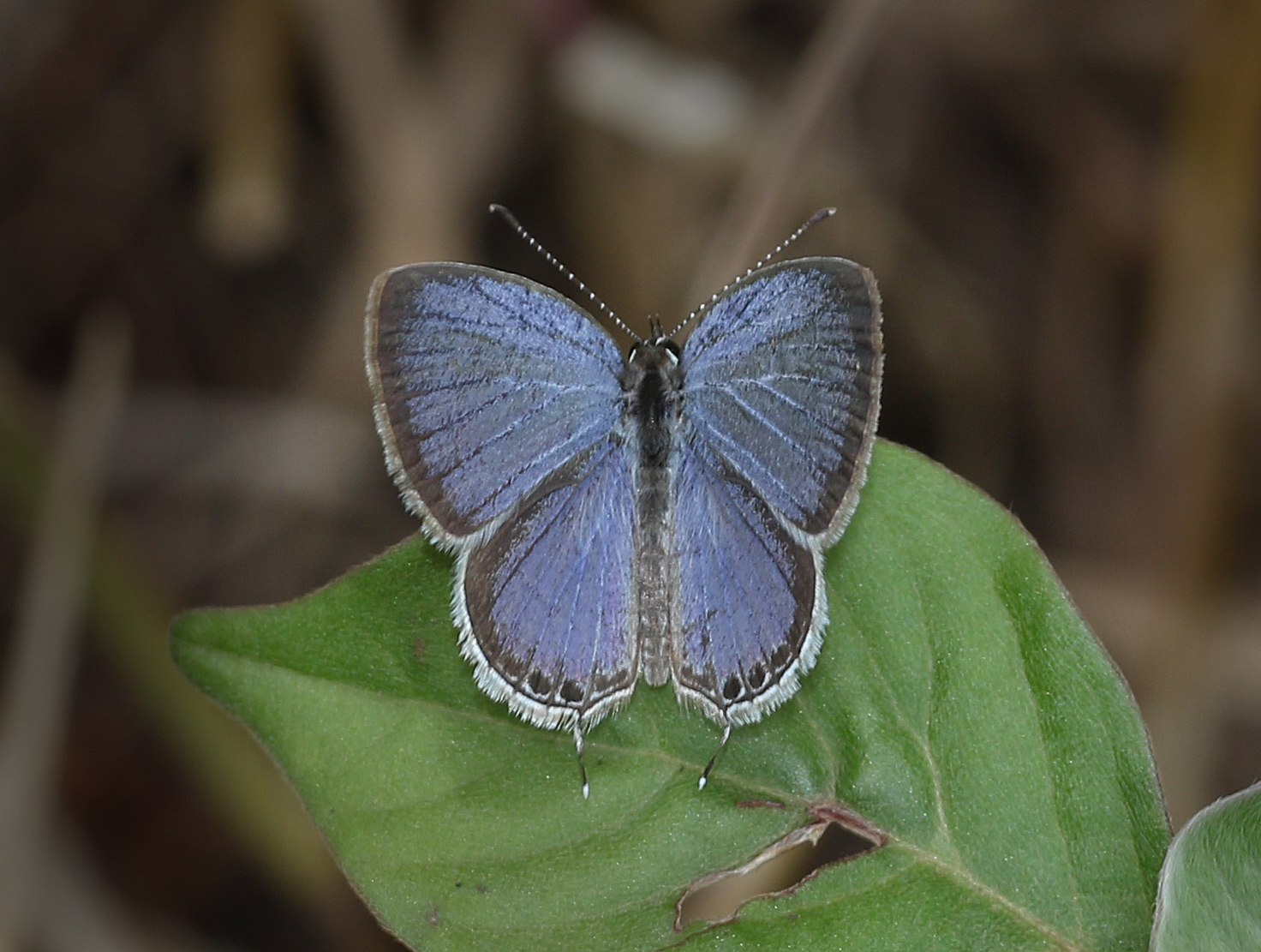
Upper side (male)

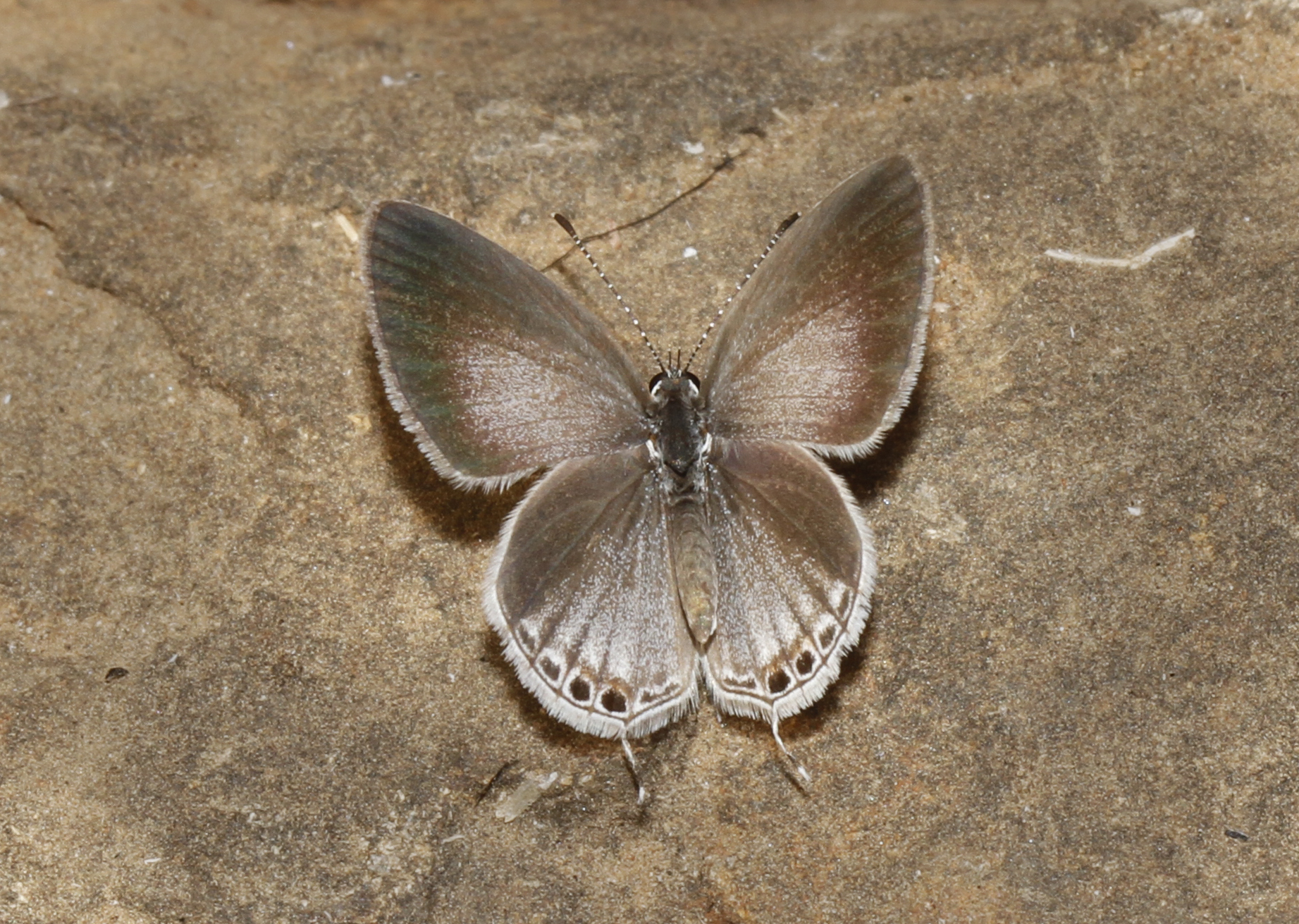
Upper side (female)

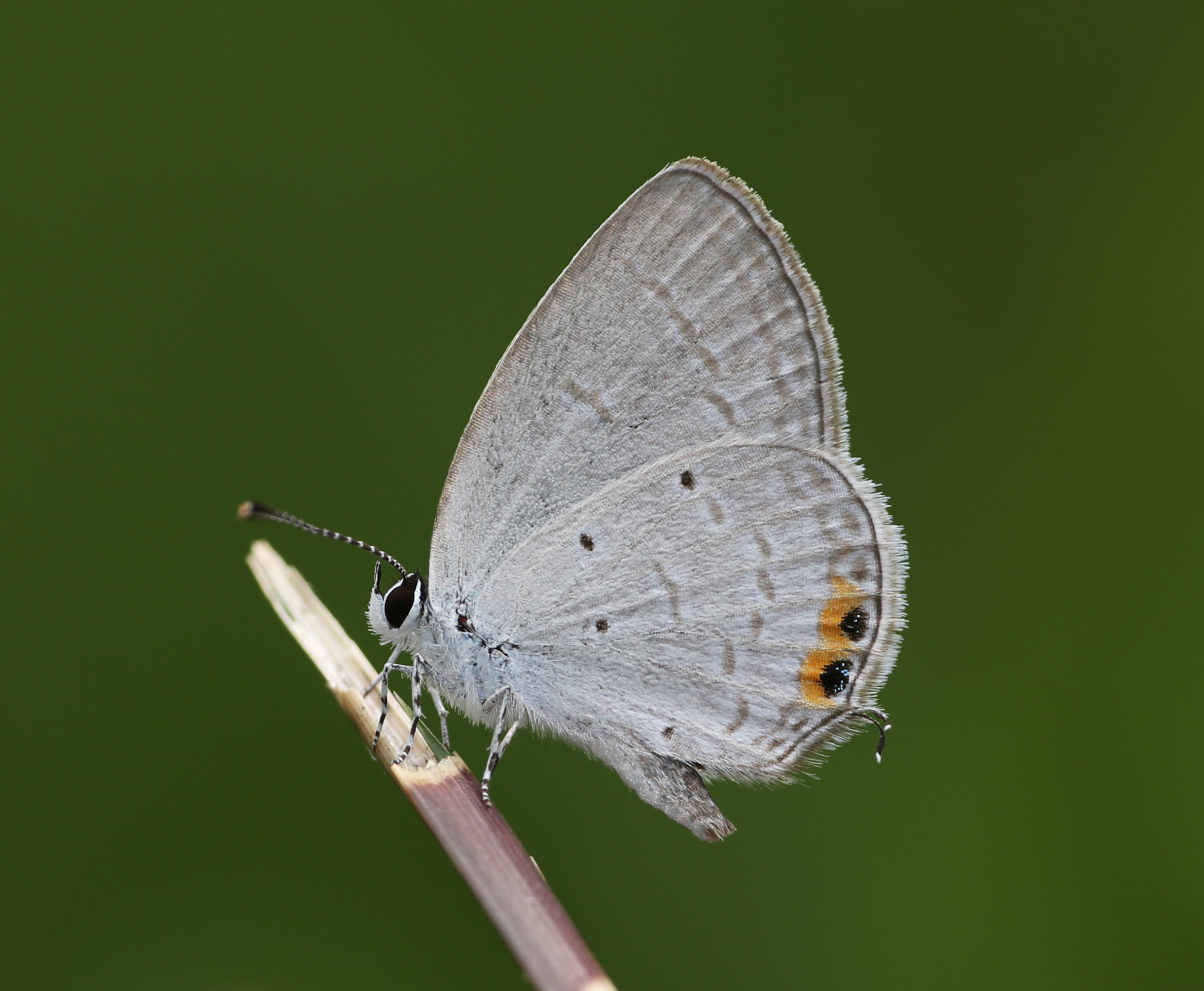
Under side (male)

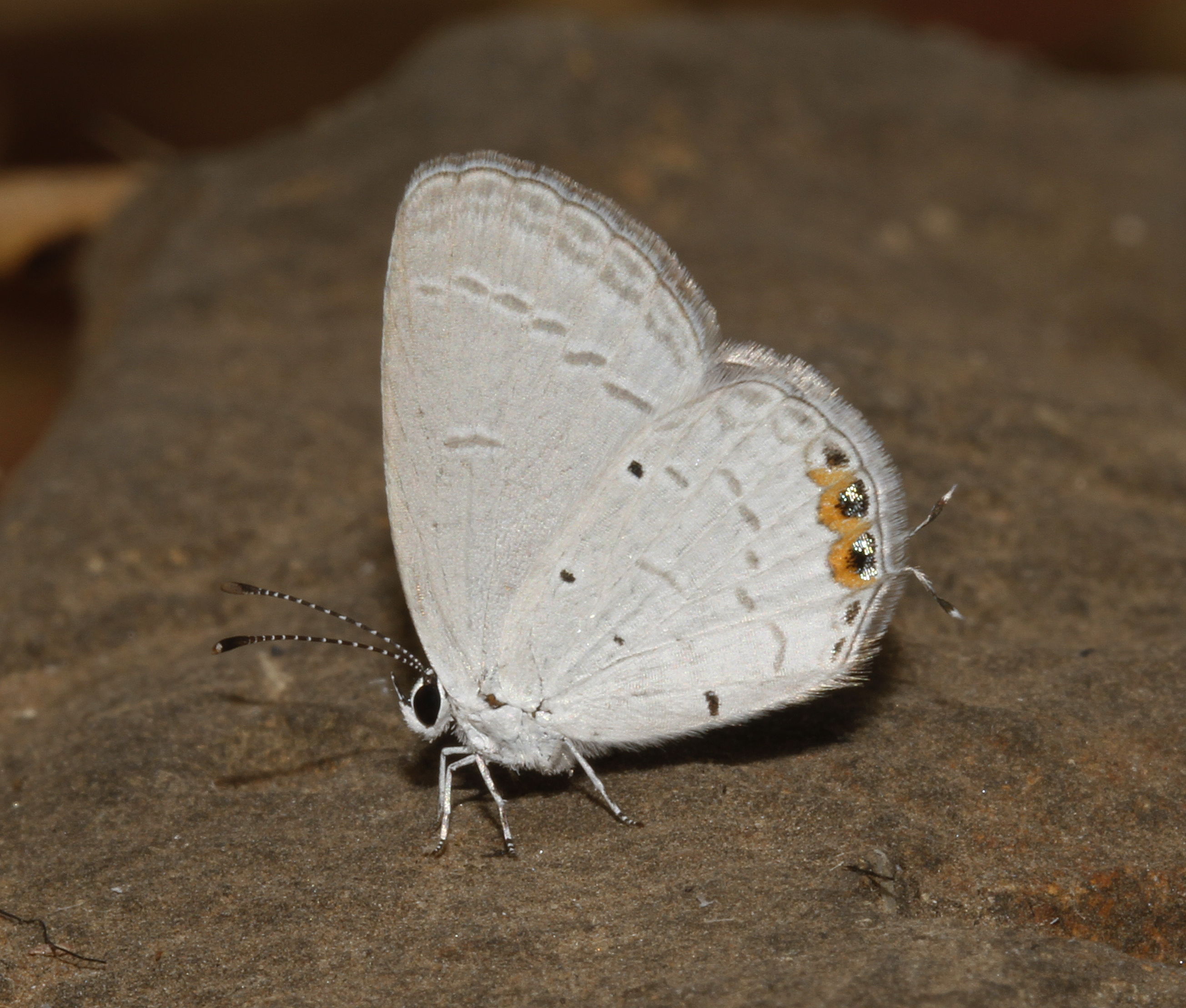
Under side (female)

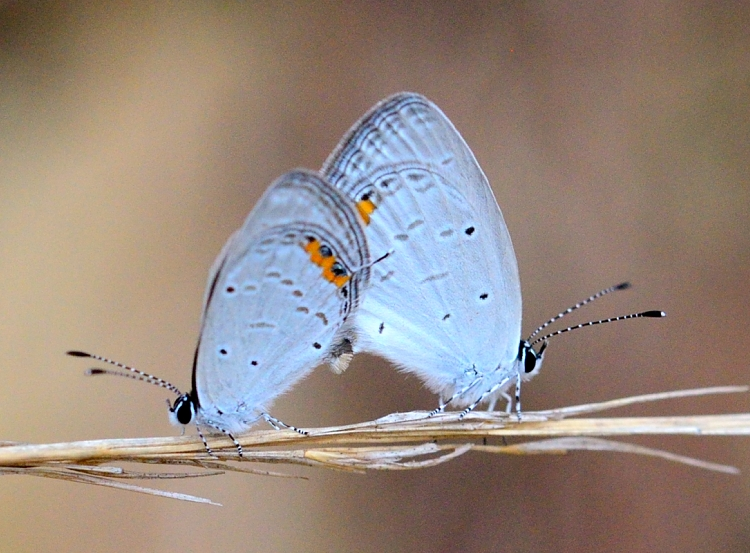
Mating pair

== Subspecies ==
The subspecies of Cupido lacturnus are:

- Cupido lacturnus syntala Cantlie, 1963 – Gujarat southwards to Andhra Pradesh and Kerala.
- Cupido lacturnus assamica Tytler, 1915 – Himachal Pradesh to N.E. India; Uttar Pradesh and Bihar.
- Cupido lacturnus pila Evans, 1925 – Andamans & Nicobars Is. (All Nicobars).
