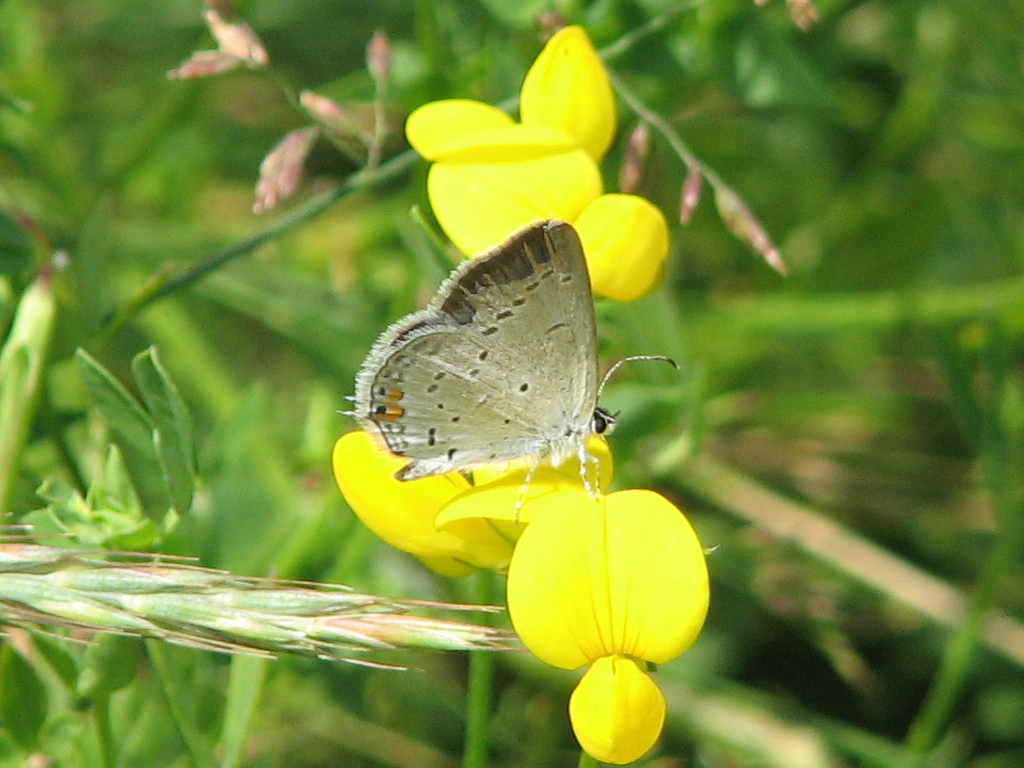
- Eastern tailed-blue (C. comyntas)

Scientific classification
- Kingdom: Animalia
- Phylum: Arthropoda
- Clade: Pancrustacea
- Class: Insecta
- Order: Lepidoptera
- Family: Lycaenidae
- Subfamily: Polyommatinae
- Tribe: Polyommatini
- Genus: Cupido; Schrank, 1801

Synonyms
- Binghamia Tutt, 1908; Tiora Evans, 1912; Ununcula van Eecke, 1915; Zizera Moore, 1881; Everes Hübner, 1819

= Cupido (butterfly) =

Butterfly genus in family Lycaenidae

Cupido is a genus of butterflies in the family Lycaenidae. The subgenus Everes (Hübner, [1819]) is included here.

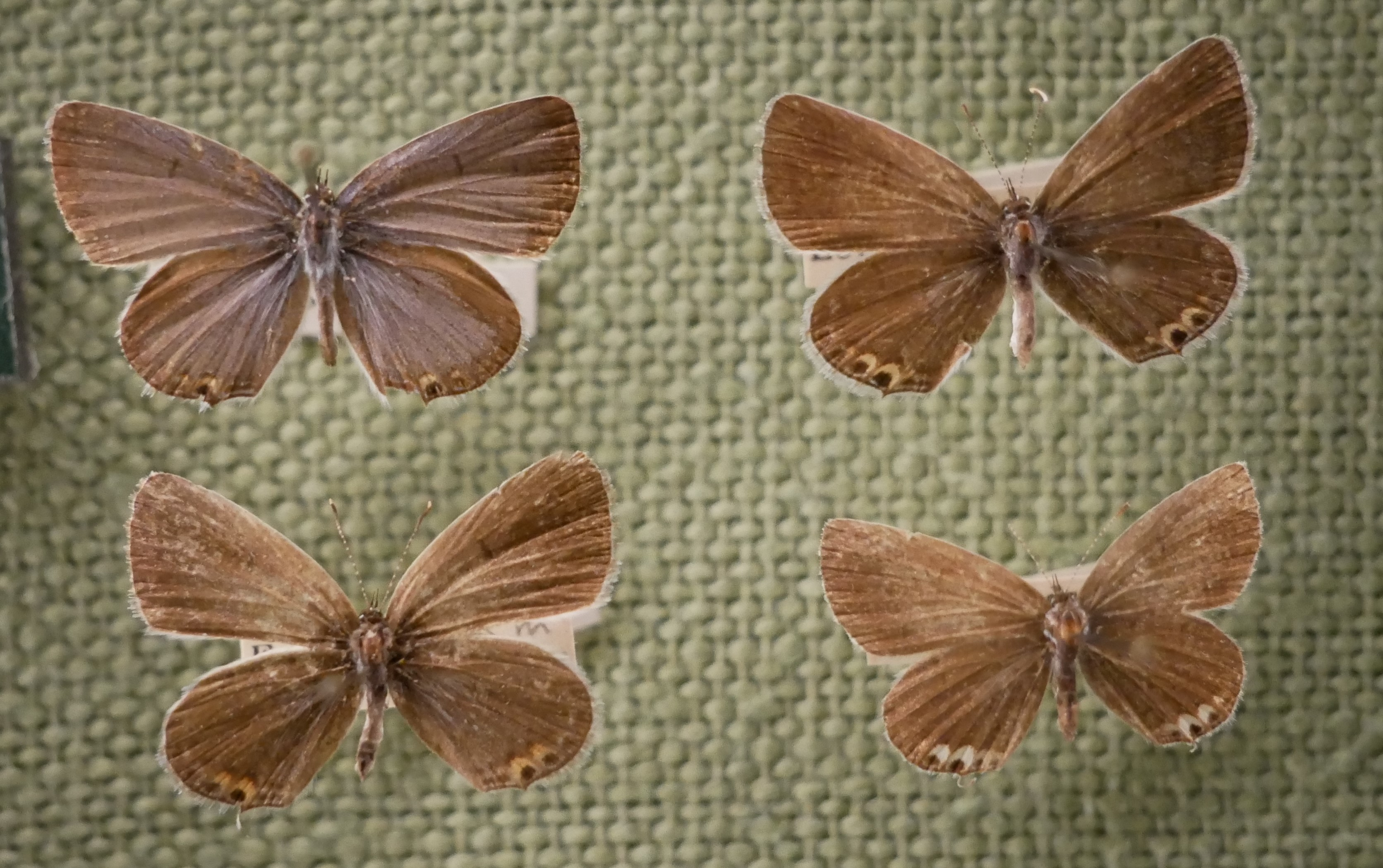
Cupido comyntas museum specimens

== Species ==
- Cupido alaina (Staudinger, 1887) Kyrgyzstan, Tajikistan, etc.
- Cupido alcetas – Provençal short-tailed blue – Central & Eastern Europe, Turkey
- Cupido amyntula – western tailed-blue – North America
- Cupido argiades – short-tailed blue
- Cupido buddhista (Alphéraky, 1881) – Buddhist blue – Central Asia
- Cupido carswelli Stempffer, 1927 – Carswell's little blue – Spain (Southeast)
- Cupido comyntas – eastern tailed-blue
- Cupido decolor (Staudinger, 1886)
- Cupido decolorata (Staudinger, 1886) – eastern short-tailed blue – Balkans and eastern Europe
- Cupido gisela (Püngeler, 1901) – Gisela blue – Tibet
- Cupido lacturnus – tailed Cupid
- Cupido lorquinii (Herrich-Schäffer, [1851]) – Lorquin's blue – North Africa and Spain
- Cupido minimus – small blue – Europe, Asia Minor, Siberia and Mongolia
- Cupido osiris – Osiris blue – Europe, Asia Minor, Siberia and Mongolia
- Cupido peri Zhdanko, 2000 Alai, Darvaz
- Cupido prosecusa (Erschoff, 1874) Central Asia
- Cupido nagarensis Charmeux & Desse, 2006 Central Asia
- Cupido staudingeri (Christoph, 1873) – Staudinger's blue – Asia Minor
- Cupido tusovi Lukhtanov, 1994 Altai Mountains
