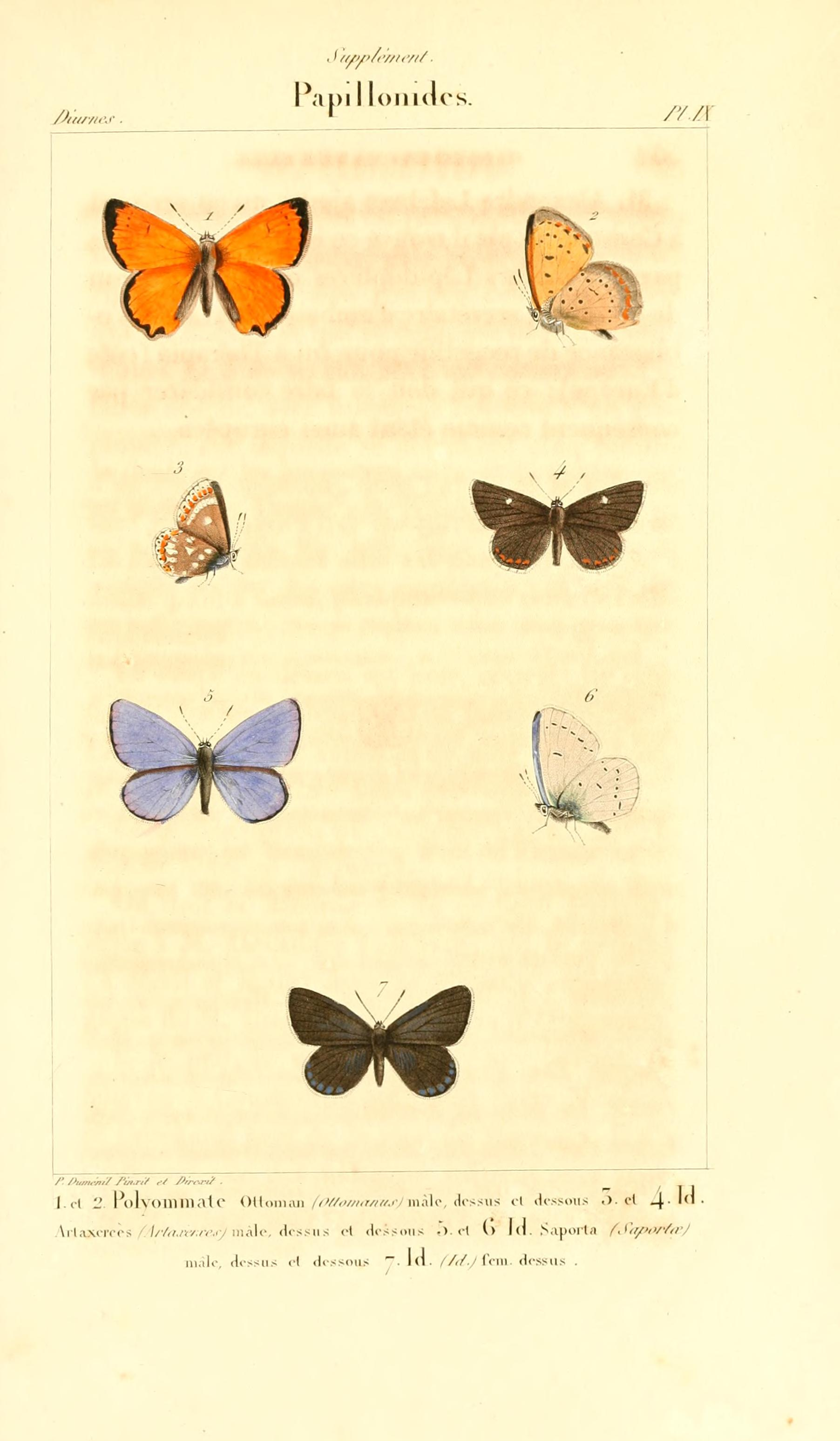
- Cupido decolorata as Polyommatus saportae Duponchel, 1832

Scientific classification
- Domain: Eukaryota
- Kingdom: Animalia
- Phylum: Arthropoda
- Class: Insecta
- Order: Lepidoptera
- Family: Lycaenidae
- Genus: Cupido
- Species: C. decolorata

Binomial name
- Cupido decolorata (Staudinger, 1886)

Synonyms
- Lycaena decolorata Staudinger, 1886

= Cupido decolorata =

Species of butterfly

Cupido decolorata, the Eastern short-tailed blue, is a small butterfly found in the Palearctic (Albania, Austria, Bulgaria, Hungary, Greece, Spain, Romania, Slovakia and the Soviet Union - the European part, the Czech Republic, Yugoslavia, Russian Federation) that belongs to the lycaenids or blues family.

== Description ==
It is a small butterfly with a sexual dimorphism, the upperside of the male is dull blue bordered with grey, that of the female is brown, both with a white fringe. The underside is pale grey a little suffused with blue and decorated with lines of small black dots.This species is similar to the Short-tailed blue (Everes argiades) and to Cupido alcetas.

== Biology ==
The larva on feeds on Medicago sativa, Medicago lupulina

== See also ==
- List of butterflies of Russia
- Images representing Cupido decoloratus at Consortium for the Barcode of Life
