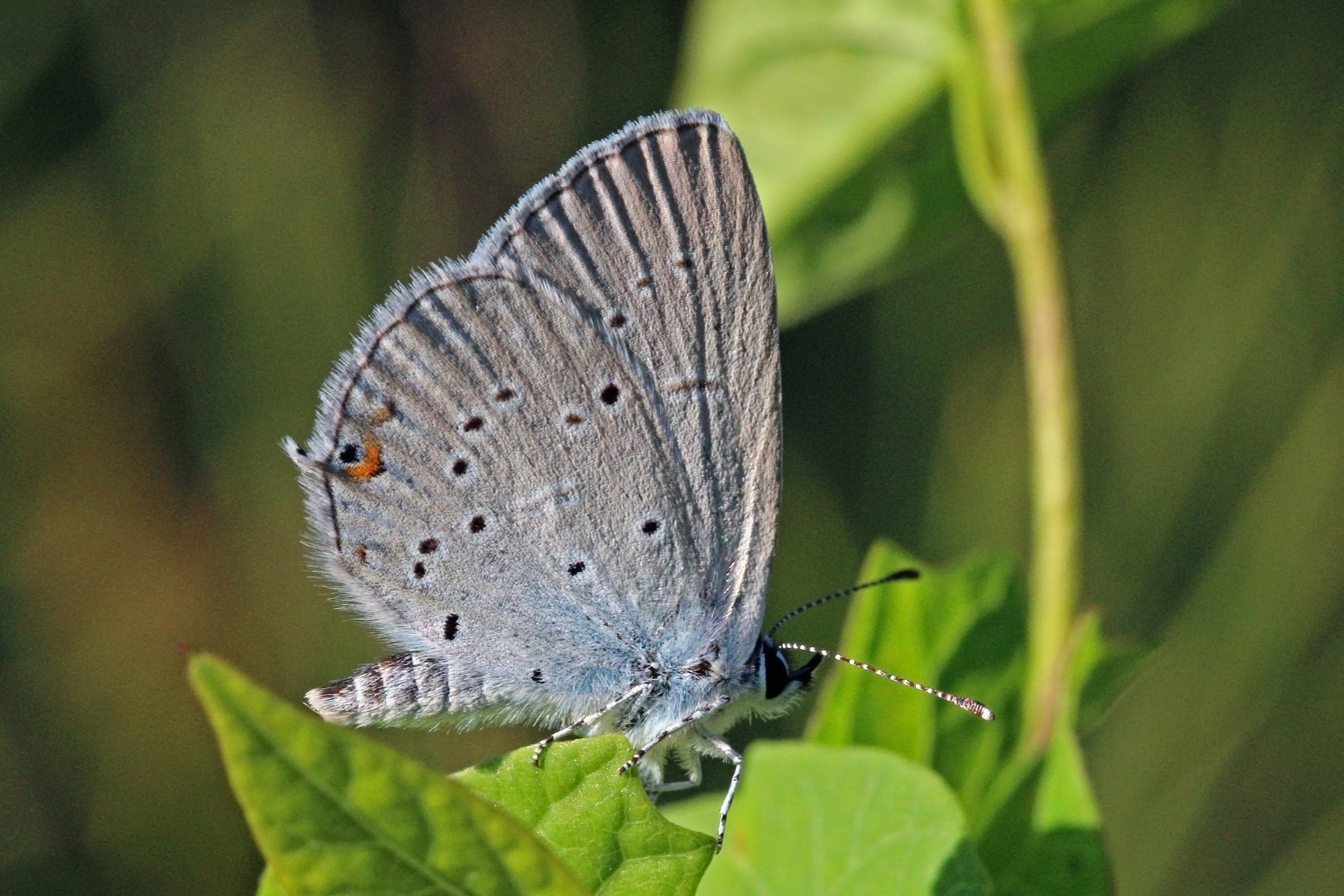
- In North Macedonia

Scientific classification
- Domain: Eukaryota
- Kingdom: Animalia
- Phylum: Arthropoda
- Class: Insecta
- Order: Lepidoptera
- Family: Lycaenidae
- Genus: Cupido
- Species: C. alcetas

Binomial name
- Cupido alcetas (Hoffmannsegg, 1804)

Synonyms
- Everes alcetas; Papilio coretas Ochsenheimer, 1808

= Cupido alcetas =

Provençal short-tailed blue

Species of butterfly

Cupido alcetas, the Provençal short-tailed blue, is a small butterfly that belongs to the family Lycaenidae.

== Etymology ==
The Latin species name alcetas refers to Ἄλκηστις (Alcestis), in Greek mythology a princess daughter of Pelias, king of Iolcus.

== Distribution ==
First described from Austria by Johann Centurius Hoffmannsegg in 1804, it occurs locally in southern and central Europe, Turkey, the Urals, southern Siberia and northern Kazakhstan.

== Habitat ==
This species lives in flowery grassy places, bushy and damp areas and woodland clearings at an elevation of 50–1,200 metres (160–3,940 ft) above sea level.

== Description ==
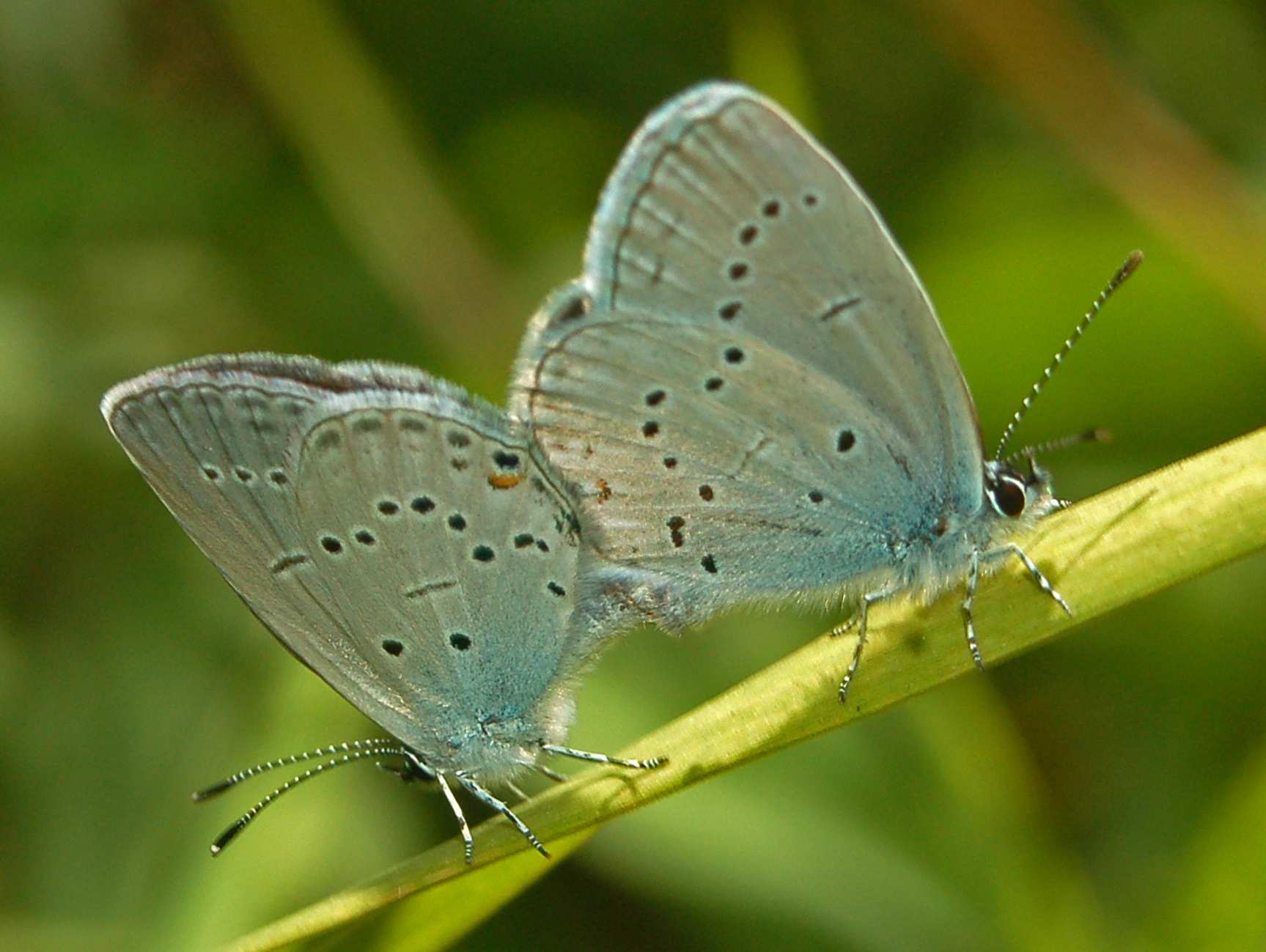
Mating pair

Cupido alcetas has a wingspan of 26–32 millimetres (1.0–1.3 in). In these small butterflies the upperside of the wings is blue-purple in males, brown in females (sexual dimorphism). The wing edge is black, with a white fringe. The underface of the wings is pale blue-gray, with a series of small black spots encircled with clearer blue. On the underside hindwings usually there is no orange. Sometimes it is present a single orange-colored anal spot that does not reach the marginal black spot. Close to the anal angle usually is present a thin, very short tail.

This species is similar to the Short-tailed blue (Cupido argiades) and (less so) to the Holly blue (Celastrina argiolus). The Eastern Short-tailed Blue ( Cupido decolorata ) can be differentiated by a black discoid spot on the upper surface of the forewings. However, a genital morphological examination is recommended for reliable identification . The short-tailed blue ( Everes argiades ) differs in that there are always two orange spots at the anal angle on the underside of the wings.

== Biology ==
Adults fly from May to September. Depending on the location, the species produces two to three generations annually (in May–June, July–August and in warmer regions in late September). Larvae feed on leaves and inflorescences of various herbaceous plants of the family Fabaceae (such as Coronilla varia, Galega officinalis, Trifolium sp., Vicia sp., Medicago lupulina and Securigera varia).

These larvae are myrmecophiles, living in association with ants of the genus Formica.
