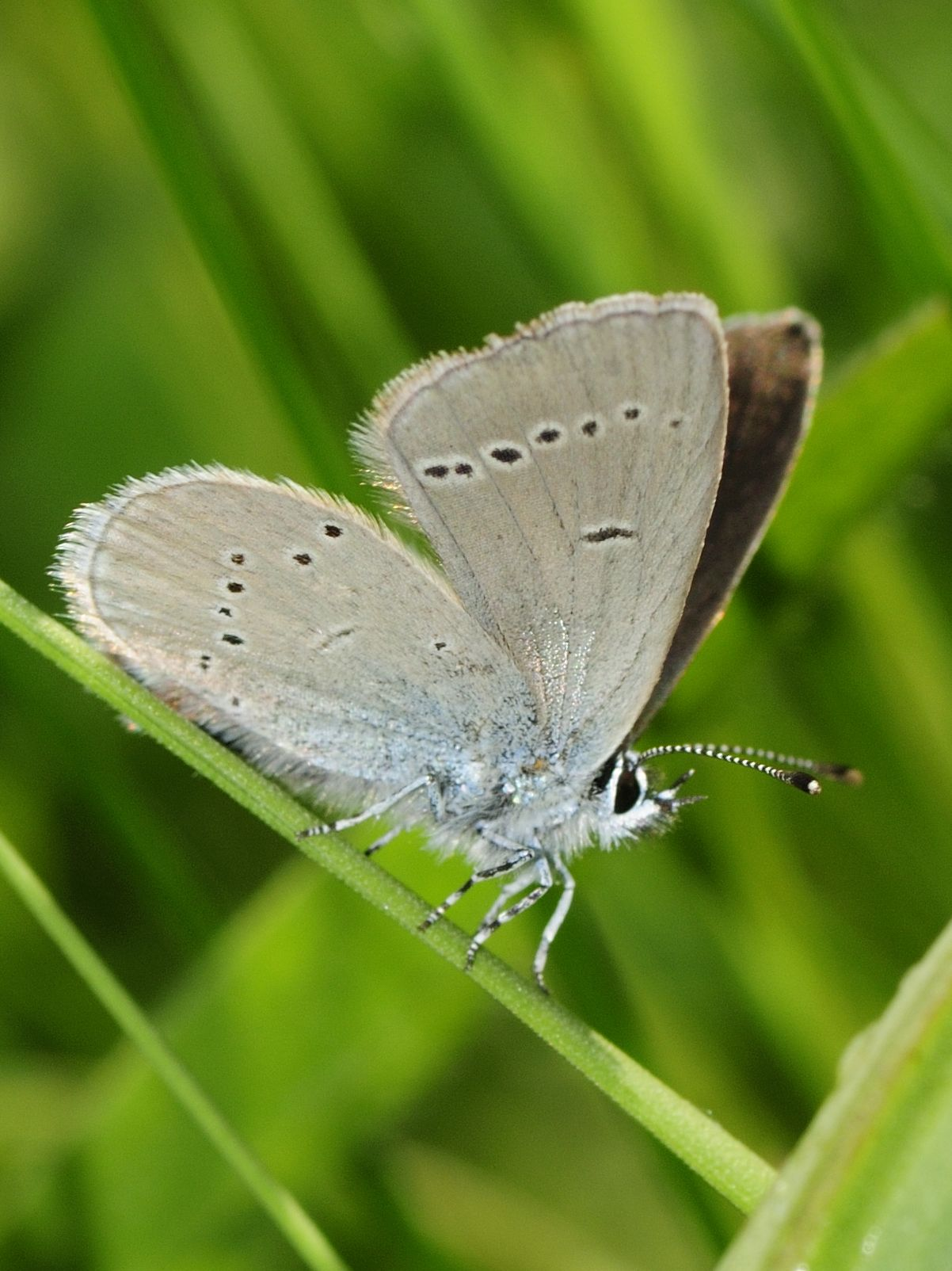
- Female Osiris blue

Scientific classification
- Domain: Eukaryota
- Kingdom: Animalia
- Phylum: Arthropoda
- Class: Insecta
- Order: Lepidoptera
- Family: Lycaenidae
- Genus: Cupido
- Species: C. osiris

Binomial name
- Cupido osiris Meigen, 1829

Synonyms
- Polyommatus sebrus (Boisduval, 1832)

= Osiris blue =

Species of butterfly

The Osiris blue (Cupido osiris) is a butterfly in the family Lycaenidae. It is found in South Europe, Asia Minor, southern Siberia, the Alay Mountains, Tian-Shan, Dzhungarsky Alatau, the Altai Region, the Sayan Mountains, Lake Baikal and Mongolia. It is often confused with the small blue, a closely related species.

The larvae feed on Onobrychis and Leguminosae species.

== Description from Seitz ==
L. sebrus Bdv. (82 c). Above dull violet-blue (male) or black-brown (female). with the markings of the underside feebly shining through, narrow black margin and white fringes; beneath light ashy grey, the base dusted with blue, the ocelli and the median spot being very delicate. In the Alps, locally plentiful, southwards to Italy, south-eastwards to Asia Minor and eastwards to the Altai. Specimens with the ocelli prolonged occur also in this species, as proved by a fine specimen in Courvoisier's collection: ab. elongata Courv. i. l. — Larva on Onobrychis and Orobus, until April and again in June. The butterflies in the mountains, sporadic, in May and again from the end of June onwards.
