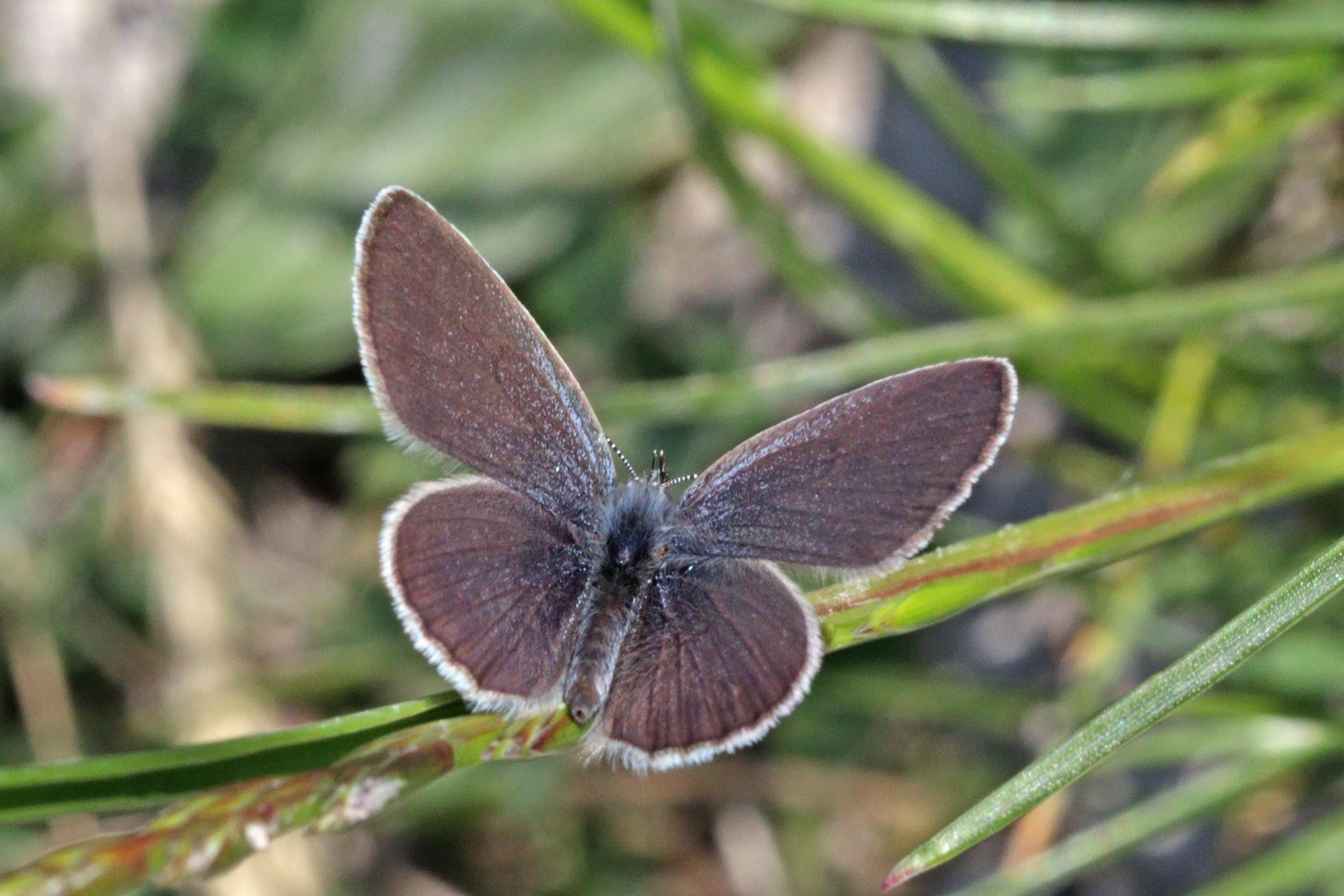
- Female both in Cotley Hill, Wiltshire

Conservation status
- Least Concern (IUCN 3.1)

Scientific classification
- Kingdom: Animalia
- Phylum: Arthropoda
- Class: Insecta
- Order: Lepidoptera
- Family: Lycaenidae
- Genus: Cupido
- Species: C. minimus

Binomial name
- Cupido minimus (Fuessly, 1775)

Synonyms
- List: Cupido bipuncta Bright & Leeds, 1938; Lycaena elongata Kieffer, 1938; Zizera minutissima Stephan, 1923; Cupido alcetoides Tutt, 1909; Cupido magnipuncta Tutt, 1909; Cupido parvipuncta Tutt, 1909; Cupido violascens Tutt, 1909; Cupido viridescens Tutt, 1909; Lycaena caeca Courvoisier, 1908; Cupido obsoleta Tutt, 1896; Cupido puer Schrank, 1801; Papilio minutus Esper, 1800; Papilio alsus Fabricius, 1787; Papilio pseudolus Bergstrasser, 1779; Papilio minimus Esper, 1778; Papilio alsus Denis & Fenn, 1776

= Small blue =

- Male

Species of butterfly

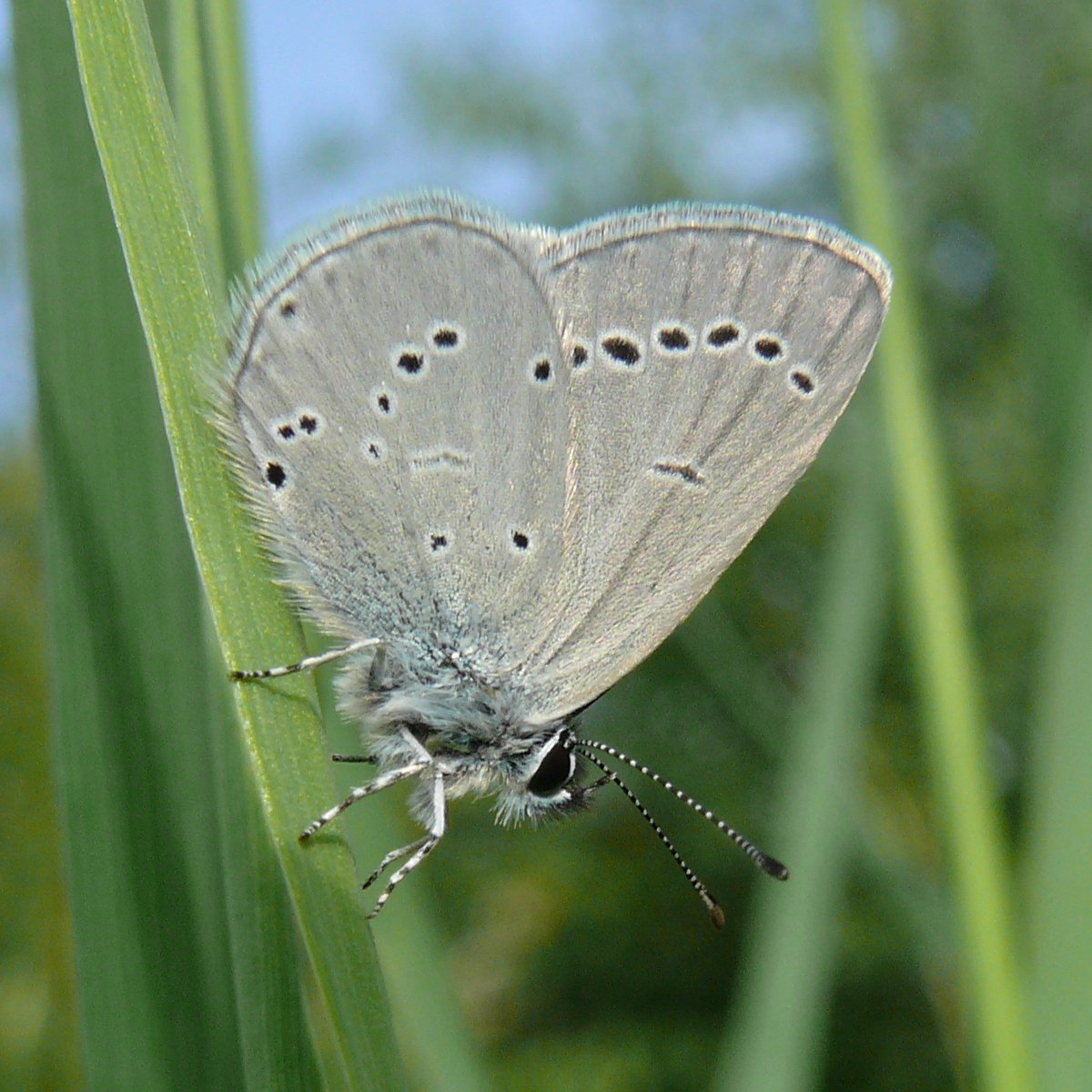
Male underside, Munich

The small blue (Cupido minimus) is a Palearctic butterfly in the family Lycaenidae. Despite its common name, it is not particularly blue. The male has some bluish suffusion at the base of its upper wings but is mostly dark brown like the female. The species can live in colonies of up to several hundred and in its caterpillar stage is cannibalistic.

== Description ==
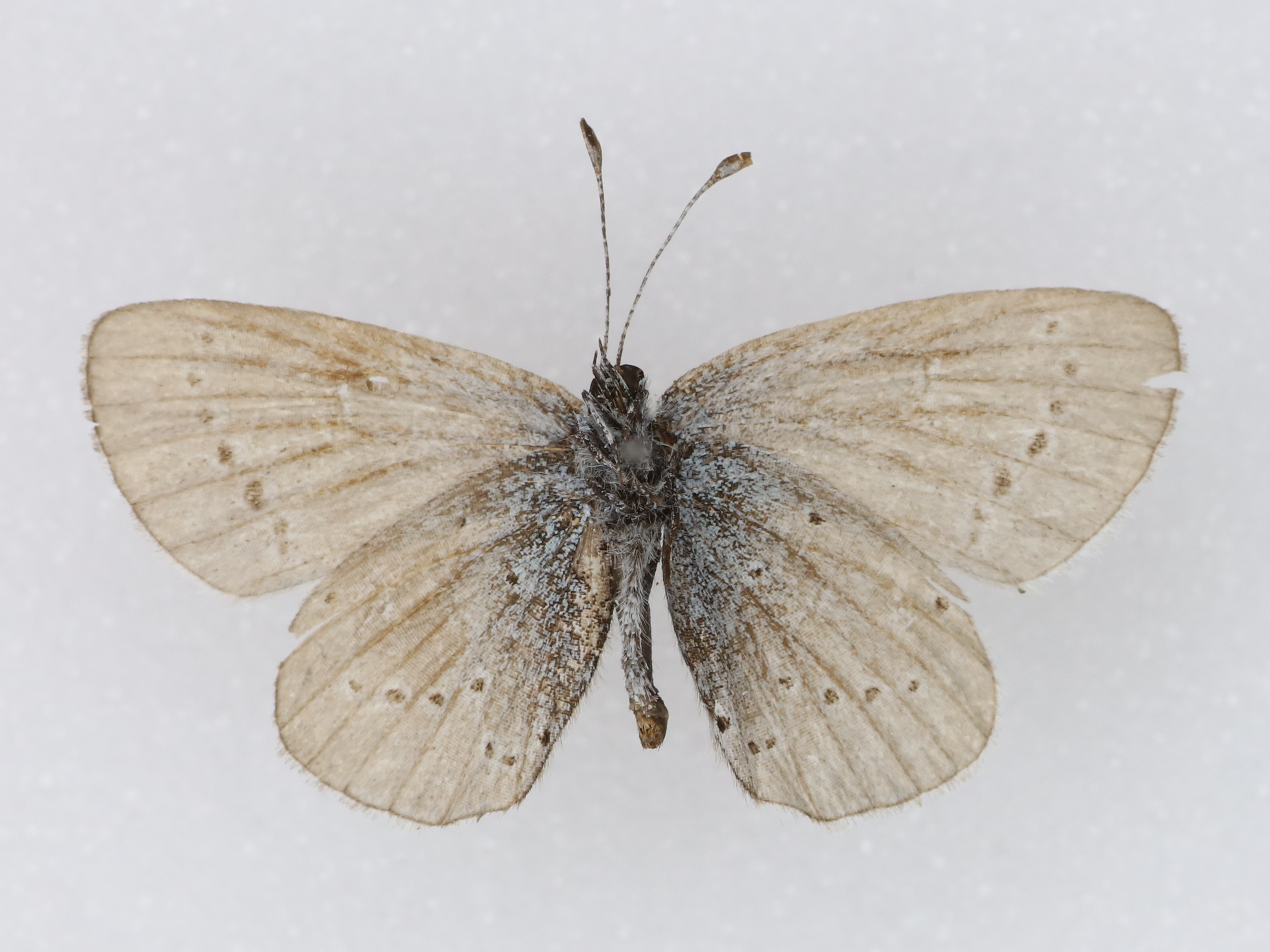
Paratype of subspecies pilyachuch from Kamchatka, in the Natural History Museum, London

Small blue males are dark brown with a scattering of bright blue scales that speckle their wings. Females lack this blue speckling. Both males and females exhibit the characteristic silver underside with black spots. The male has a bluish tint at the base of its wings similar to the upper side. Their wingspan can fall anywhere from 16-27mm, but males tend to be the smaller sex. Small blues are often confused with the female Osiris Blue, whose coloring is similar to that of the male small blue.

== Geographic range ==
C. minimus is found in Europe, Asia Minor, Transcaucasia, Tian-Shan, western Siberia, central Siberia, southern Siberia, the Russian Far East, Amur, Mongolia, Magadan and Kamchatka.

=== UK and Ireland ===
The small blue is the smallest butterfly species found in the United Kingdom. It has a very patchy distribution across the UK, with strongholds in the chalk and limestone grasslands of southern England, such as the Cotswolds and Salisbury Plain. Elsewhere in Great Britain and Ireland, it is often found in coastal habitats, with widely scattered colonies in northern England and the far north of Scotland. It is a Priority Species for conservation in Northern Ireland and under the UK Biodiversity Action Plan.

== Habitat ==
C. minimus live in calcareous grasslands, abandoned quarries, railway and embankments and woodland edges and clearings.

== Food resources ==
Recorded larval food plants are Oxytropis campestris, Astragalus alpinus, Lotus corniculatus, Anthyllis vulneraria, Melilotus, Coronilla, Medicago, Anthyllis vulneraria, Astragalus glycyphyllos and Astragalus cicer, which all are legumes.

In the UK, small blues lay their eggs, live, and feed exclusively on the kidney vetch. While females obtain all of their nutrients from plants, males will extract salts and minerals from carrion, dung, and mud puddles.

== Mating ==
During the courtship period, males will perch on a covered grass or shrubs while waiting for females. During this time, males become very territorial over their chosen spot. Virgin females flying by will mate with the males without any elaborate courtship. Mated females will wait in the grass out of sight to avoid other males when a male is nearby.

== Oviposition ==
After mating, the female will search for a suitable place to lay a single egg, such as a healthy food plant. Once she has found one, she will lay the egg between two florets on the flower head in order to keep it mostly hidden, and secure the egg. To prevent other females from laying eggs on the same flower, the female small blue will rub her abdomen against the florets to leave a scent marker before she leaves. The caterpillars are cannibalistic and will eat one another if more than one hatches on the same flower. However, this scent marker does not last more than a few days, so multiple eggs are often found on a single plant.

== Life cycle ==
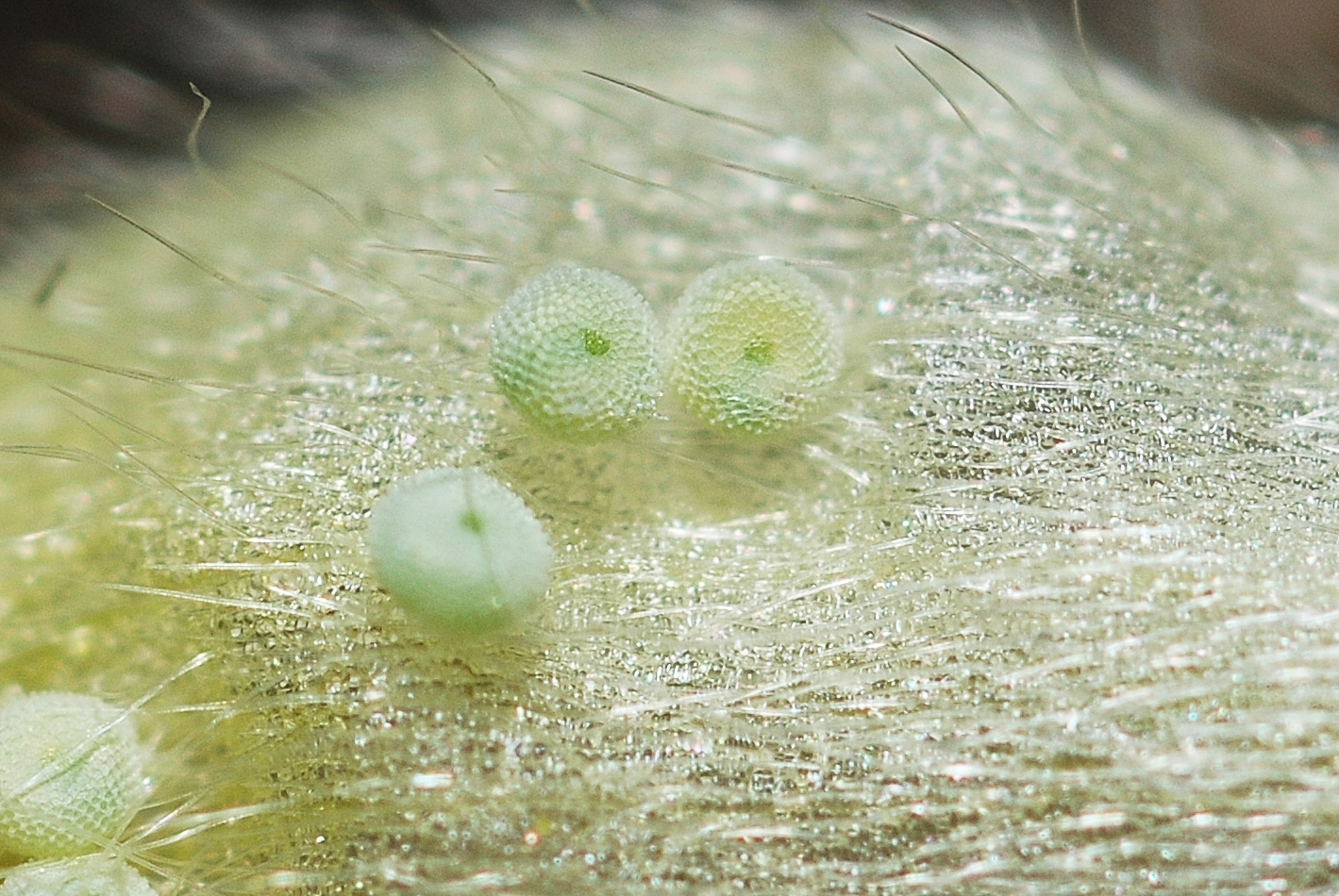
Eggs

=== Ovum ===
Eggs will typically hatch between one and three weeks, depending on location and temperature. They are .40mm in diameter and .2mm in height. The eggs are light green with white reticulations.

=== Larvae ===
==== First instar ====
First-instar larvae are typically very pale blue, almost white, with a black head. When the caterpillar first emerges from the egg, it is about .80mm long and will grow to 1.3 mm by the end of the first instar. They have several small hairs along the length of their bodies. Once hatched, the larvae will eat through the calyx of the plant as well as the young green legumes on which they are typically laid. First instar larvae are also cannibalistic, and will feed on any smaller larvae that cross its path.

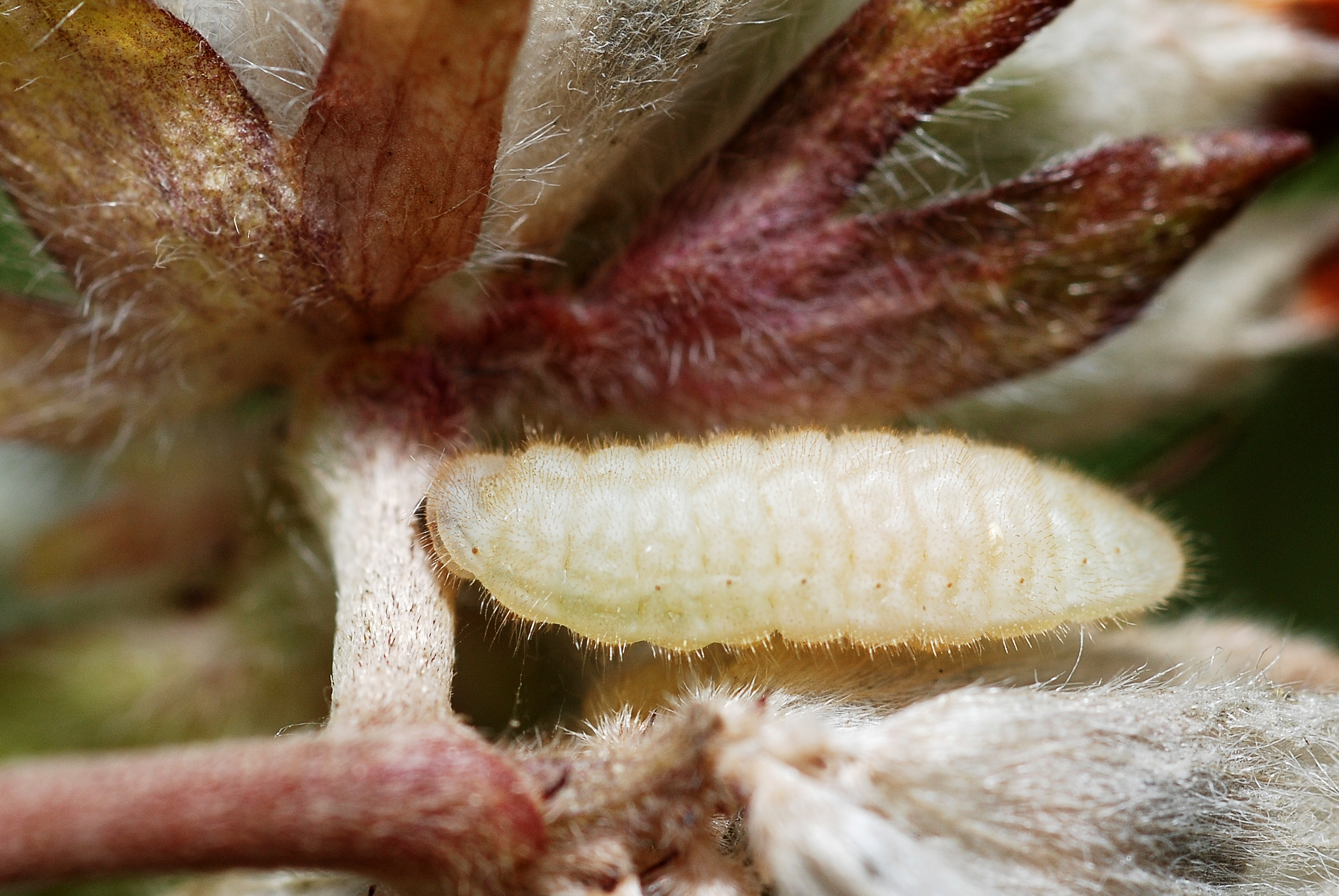
Caterpillar

==== Second instar ====
During the second instar, the caterpillar will grow to about 4 mm long. Its hairs will become more densely packed. While the head remains black, the main colour becomes a very pale yellow. By this point, the larvae will have developed a scent gland on the tenth segment, which can be seen pulsing as it moves.

==== Third instar ====
In this stage, the caterpillars will attack and eat one another. It has more hairs even still and is deeper yellow in colour.

==== Fourth instar ====
By the fourth instar, the caterpillar is about 1 cm long. It ranges in colour from pale green to pale yellow and has a dorsal stripe. In late summer, they form small silk cocoons for hibernation and remain motionless for ten months. Their cocoons resemble dead calyces, and thus provide camouflage from predators.

=== Pupa ===
The pupa stage usually lasts between one and three weeks and is often temperature-dependent. Caterpillars will attach themselves head up to the underside of a leaf or blade of grass using a silk cincture that is in turn attached to a silk pad. The pupa is light green in colour with brown specks and small hair-like structures along the width

=== Imago ===
The adult small blue has a lifespan of around three months. In the southern United Kingdom, there are two broods each summer. The first brood emerges in June and the second in August, with the second brood being smaller. However, in the north of the United Kingdom, only the June brood is present. The small blue is diurnal, and often lives in colonies. While most colonies consist of a few dozen individuals, colonies of several hundred have been recorded.

== Subspecies ==
Cupido minimus trinacriae Verity, 1919 Sicily

== Conservation status ==
In recent years, the small blue has lost much of its habitat in the United Kingdom, thus making it a Priority Species for conservation in Northern Ireland and under the UK Biodiversity Action Plan. It is one of 41 species of principal importance listed under Schedule 5 of the 1981 Wildlife and Countryside Act and the 1985 Northern Ireland Wildlife Order.

== See also ==
- List of butterflies of Great Britain
