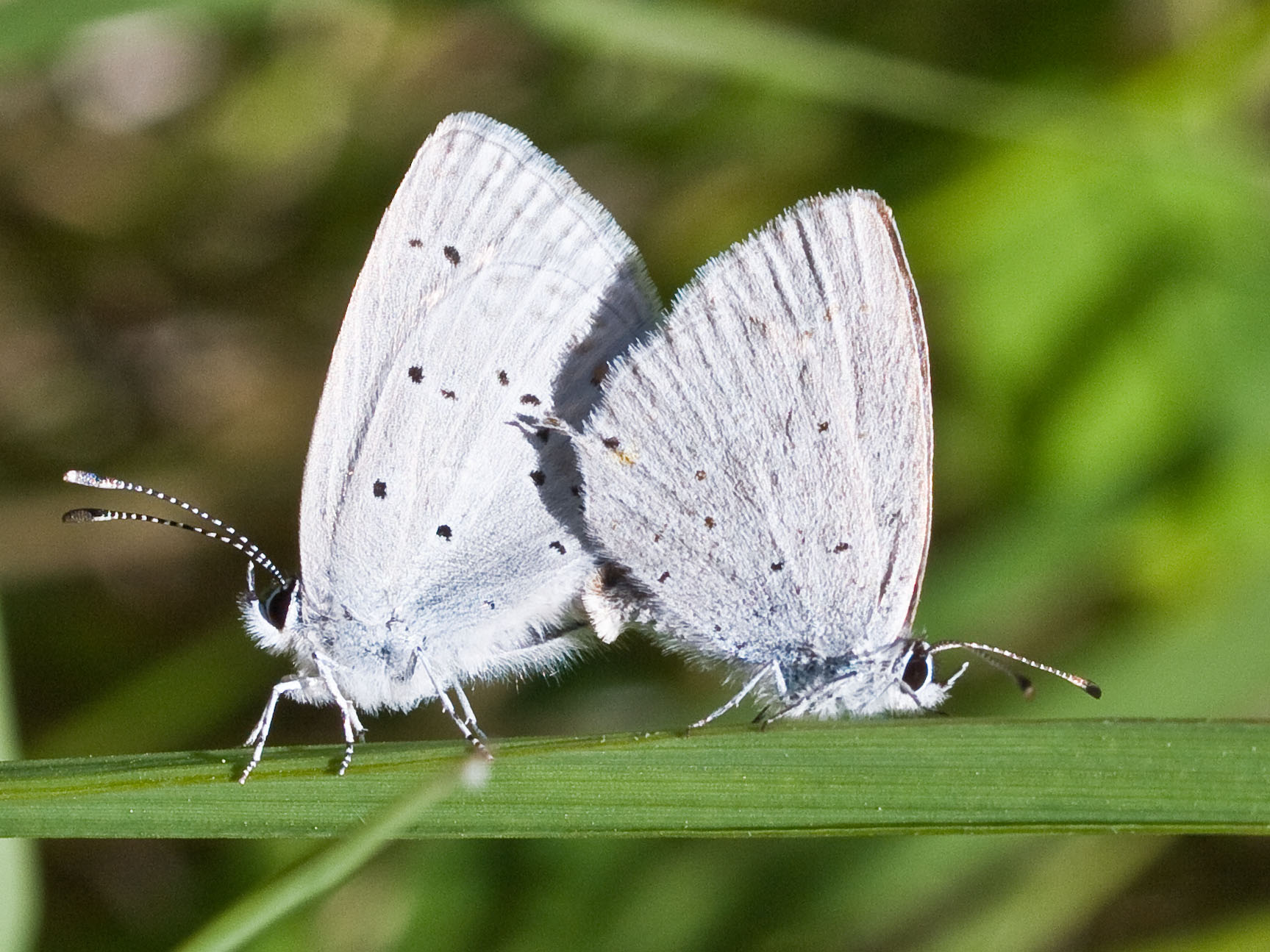
- Mating pair

Conservation status
- Least Concern (IUCN 3.1)

Scientific classification
- Kingdom: Animalia
- Phylum: Arthropoda
- Clade: Pancrustacea
- Class: Insecta
- Order: Lepidoptera
- Family: Lycaenidae
- Genus: Cupido
- Species: C. amyntula

Binomial name
- Cupido amyntula Boisduval, 1852

= Western tailed-blue =

Species of butterfly

The western tailed-blue (Cupido amyntula) is a Nearctic non-migratory butterfly that commonly takes flight during the spring and summer seasons of March–July. They have a tail on their hindwing, an upper surface that's bluish, and an under surface that is chalky-white with occasional black spots, and an orange spot toward the base of the tail. The wingspan ranges from 0.875 to 1.125 inches (2.2 to 2.9 cm). Larvae feed on various legumes with inflated seed pods, including Astragalus (several species), Lathyrus (several species), Oxytropis, and Vicia (several species). Adults feed on various things such as flower nectar, horse and coyote manure, urine, and mud.

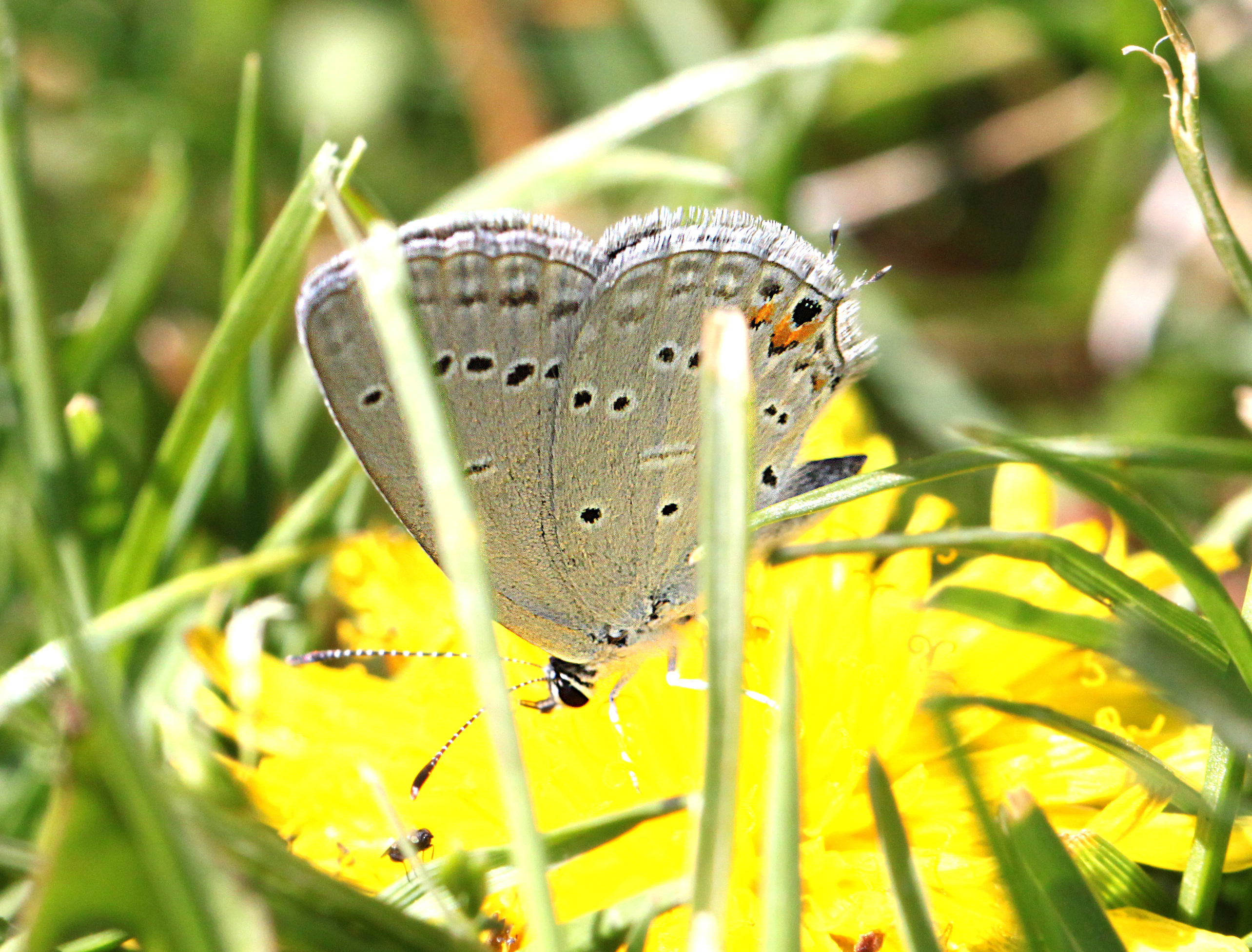
C. amyntula on a flower with its physical wing characteristics.

== Habitat ==
The western tailed-blue can be most abundantly found in open areas containing low shrubs extending throughout western North America from as high as south Alaska to as low as northern Baja California. These species prefer to reside more in forest densities, with equal presence in mature and young forests, compared to grassland habitats within these regions. They also have no preference for an open tree canopy cover and are equally likely to be found in mature forests adjacent to agricultural fields, young forests, and grasslands. They are found in higher densities of host plant cover and nectar plants among certain sites including meadows, prairies, and young forests. Within these locations, adult C. amynula visits white, purplish, yellow, or pinkish flowers, including Sedum lanceolatum and Astragalus flexuosus. The density of these species is highest where nectar plants and forest openings are widely available. Other habitat characteristics these species are known for include moist woodland openings under mature, open forests.

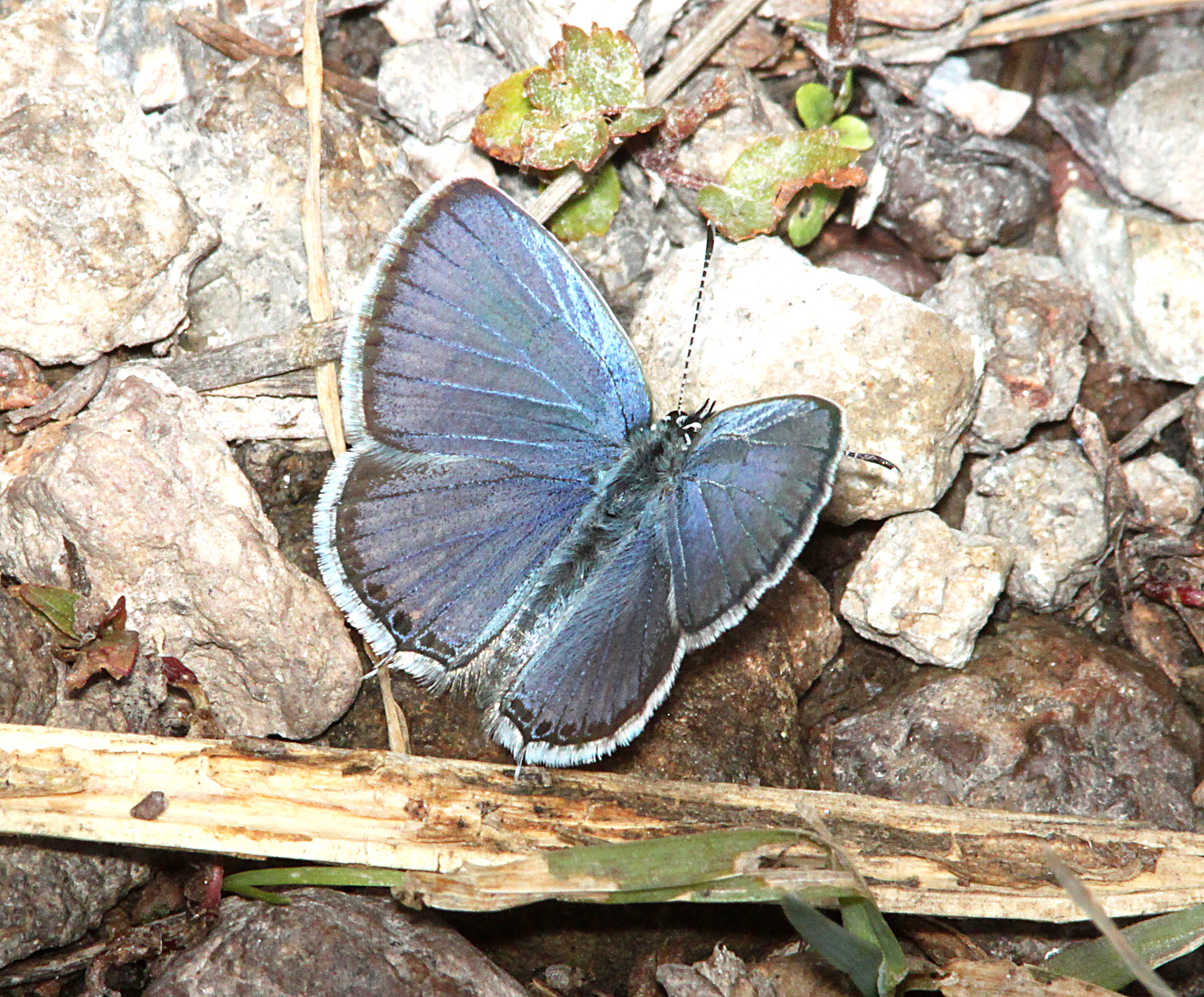
Upperside view of C. amyntula wing.

This species also occurs along weedy forest margins across Canada, as far as eastern Quebec, New Brunswick, and Maine.

male C. a. albrighti

female C. a. albrighti

== Reproductive characteristics ==
During mating, the male and female C. amyntula join tips of their abdomen and the male passes sperm to the female to fertilize its eggs. They typically lay up to 3 eggs on a single host plant flower or young seed pod.

=== Females ===
Females are characterized by a brown wing with blue coloring at the base. Once fertilized, females can lay up to 80 eggs per ovariole. Eggs hatch in about 4-5 days and develop from larva to pupa in about 14-25 days. Adults then emerge from pupae in 11-14 days.

=== Males ===
Male C. amyntula typically perches and patrols between shrubs, hillsides, and gully mouths throughout the day in search of a receptive female to mate with. Males can also be distinguished by a blue upper surface.

=== Caterpillars ===
The caterpillars of the C. amyntula vary from brownish-yellow to green and are covered in fine white hairs marked with a red or green stripe running along the back and diagonal pinkish and reddish-purple dashes on the side. They typically grow to an average length of 1/2 an inch.
