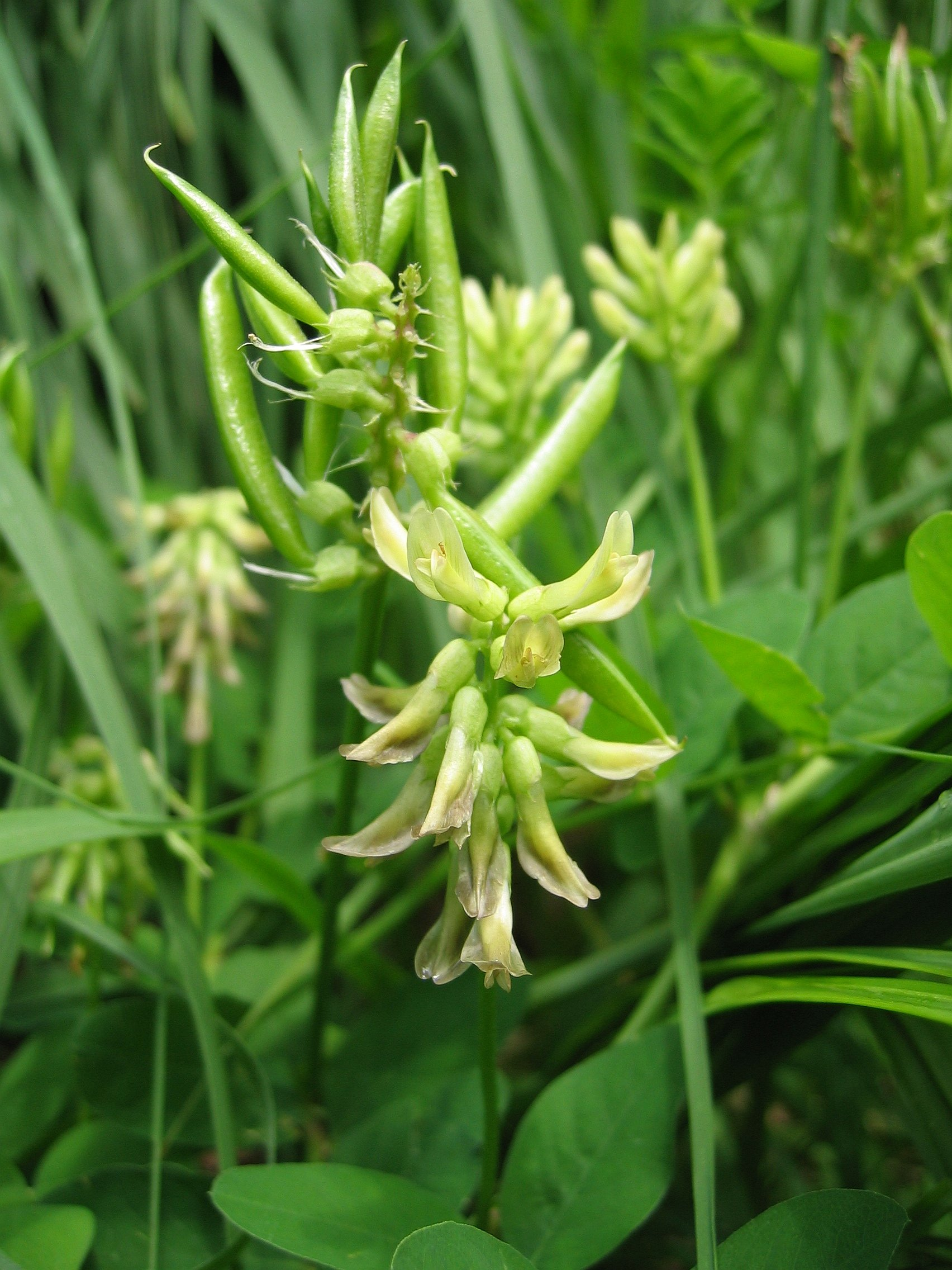

Scientific classification
- Kingdom: Plantae
- Clade: Tracheophytes
- Clade: Angiosperms
- Clade: Eudicots
- Clade: Rosids
- Order: Fabales
- Family: Fabaceae
- Subfamily: Faboideae
- Genus: Astragalus
- Species: A. glycyphyllos

Binomial name
- Astragalus glycyphyllos L., 1753

Synonyms
- Hamosa glycyphyllos (L.) Medik.; Hedyphylla glycyphylla (L.) Rydb.

= Astragalus glycyphyllos =

Species of legume

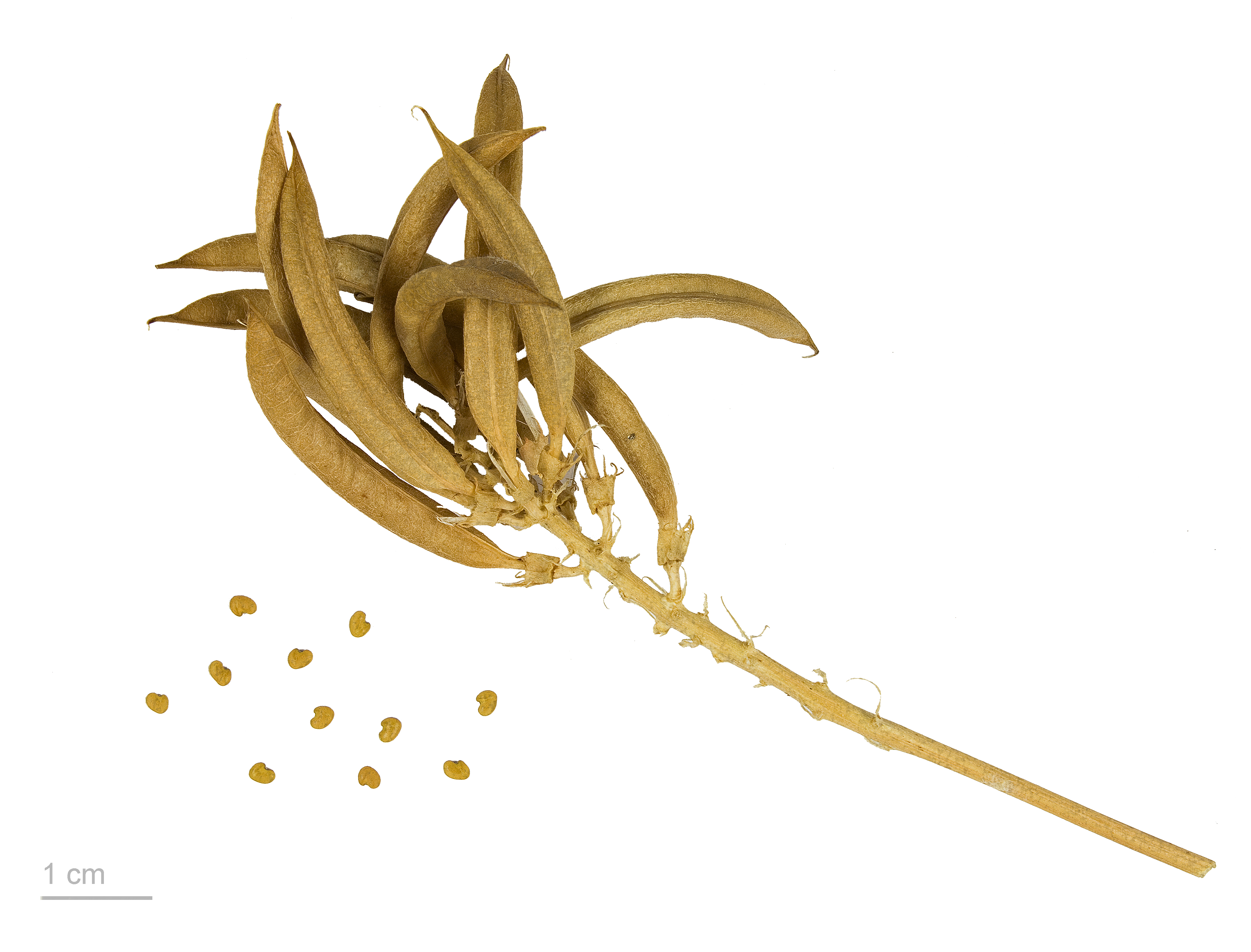
Astragalus glycyphyllos - MHNT

Astragalus glycyphyllos (liquorice milkvetch, wild liquorice, wild licorice) is a flowering plant in the family Fabaceae, native to Europe. It is a perennial herbaceous plant which is sometimes used for tea.

== Distribution ==
Native to the majority of Europe, excluding Ireland, Iceland and the Greek islands. Also native to Western Asia (Northern Iran and Turkey), the Caucasus region, Siberia and Middle Asia (North-eastern Kazakhstan). The species has been introduced near the Great Lakes on the territories of states such as: Connecticut, Indiana, Massachusetts, New Jersey, New York and Ontario.
