= List of fritillaries (butterflies) =

This is a list of species of butterfly with the common name fritillary. The term fritillary refers to the chequered markings on the wings, usually black on orange, and derives from the Latin fritillus, meaning "dice-box" (or, according to some sources, a "chequerboard"); the fritillary flower, with its chequered markings, has the same derivation. Most butterfly fritillaries belong to the family of Nymphalidae, within which are several genera whose species are nearly all called fritillaries: Argynnis, Boloria, Speyeria (the greater fritillaries), Euphydryas, Melitaea, and Agraulis.

Common name	Latin name	Distribution	Image
Adiaste fritillary	Speyeria adiaste	North America	
Aetherie fritillary	Melitaea aetherie	Africa	
African leopard fritillary	Phalanta eurytis	Africa	
Alberta fritillary	Boloria alberta	North America	
Aphrodite fritillary	Speyeria aphrodite	North America	
Assmann's fritillary	Melitaea britomartis	Europe, Asia	
Astarte fritillary	Boloria astarte	North America	
Atlantis fritillary	Speyeria atlantis	North America	
Balkan fritillary	Boloria graeca	Europe	
Baluchi fritillary	Melitaea robertsi	Asia	
Beringian fritillary	Boloria natazhati	North America	
Blackvein fritillary	Melitaea arcesia	Asia	
Bog fritillary	Boloria eunomia	North America	
Callippe fritillary	Speyeria callippe	North America	
Caribbean false fritillary	Anetia pantheratus	Caribbean	
Cranberry fritillary	Boloria aquilonaris	Europe	
Crescent spot fritillary	Anthanassa texana	North America	
Cryptic fritillary	Boloria natazhati	North America	
Dark green fritillary	Argynnis aglaja	Europe, Asia	
Desert fritillary	Melitaea deserticola	Africa, Asia	
Diana fritillary	Speyeria diana	North America	
Dingy fritillary	Boloria improba	Europe, North America	
Duke of Burgundy fritillary	Hamearis lucina	Europe	
Eastern knapweed fritillary	Melitaea ornata	Southeastern Europe	
Edwards' fritillary	Speyeria edwardsii	North America	
Egleis fritillary	Speyeria egleis	North America	
European meadow fritillary	Melitaea parthenoides	Europe	
False fritillary	Pseudargynnis	Africa	
False heath fritillary	Melitaea diamina	Europe	
Forest leopard fritillary	Phalanta eurytis	Africa	
Freija fritillary	Boloria freija	Europe, North America	
Freyer's fritillary	Melitaea arduinna	Europe, Asia	
Frigga fritillary	Boloria frigga	Europe/North America/Asia	
Glanville fritillary	Melitaea cinxia	Europe/North America/Asia	
Great Basin fritillary	Speyeria egleis	North America	
Great spangled fritillary	Speyeria cybele	North America	
Grisons fritillary	Melitaea varia	Europe	
Gulf fritillary	Agraulis vanillae	North and South America	
Heath fritillary	Melitaea athalia	Europe, Asia	
High brown fritillary	Fabriciana adippe	Europe, Asia	
Hydaspe fritillary	Speyeria hydaspe	North America	
Indian fritillary	Argynnis hyperbius	Asia	
Knapweed fritillary	Melitaea phoebe	Europe/Asia/North America	
Lesser false fritillary	Anetia briarea	Caribbean	
Lesser marbled fritillary	Brenthis ino	Asia, Europe	
Lesser spotted fritillary	Melitaea trivia	Europe/Asia/ North America	
Little fritillary	Melitaea asteria	Europe	
Marbled fritillary	Brenthis daphne	Europe, Asia	
Marsh fritillary	Euphydryas aurinia	Europe, Asia	
Meadow fritillary	Boloria bellona	North America	
Meadow fritillary	Melitaea parthenoides	Europe	
Mexican fritillary	Euptoieta hegesia	America	
Mormon fritillary	Speyeria mormonia	North America	
Mountain fritillary	Boloria napaea	Europe/North America/Asia	
Nickerl's fritillary	Melitaea aurelia	Europe	
Niobe fritillary	Argynnis niobe	Europe, Asia	
Northwestern fritillary	Speyeria hesperis	North America	
Pacific fritillary	Boloria epithore	North America	
Pallas' fritillary	Argynnis laodice	Europe, Asia	
Pearl-bordered fritillary	Boloria euphrosyne	Europe, Asia	
Pleistocene fritillary	Boloria natazhati	North America	
Polaris fritillary	Boloria polaris	Europe, America	
Provençal fritillary	Melitaea deione	Europe, Africa	
Purplish fritillary	Boloria chariclea	Europe, North America	
Queen of Spain fritillary	Issoria lathonia	Europe	
Red-band fritillary	Melitaea didyma	Europe/Asia/Africa	
Regal fritillary	Speyeria idalia	North America	
Scarce fritillary	Euphydryas maturna	Europe	
Shepherd's fritillary	Boloria pales	Europe, Asia	
Silver-washed fritillary	Argynnis paphia	Europe/Africa/Asia	
Small pearl-bordered fritillary	Boloria selene	Europe/Asia/North America	
Spotted fritillary	Melitaea didyma	Europe/Africa/Asia	
Thor's fritillary	Boloria thore	Europe, Asia	
Titania's fritillary	Boloria titania	Europe, Asia	
Twin-spot fritillary	Brenthis hecate	Europe, Asia	
Uncompahgre fritillary	Boloria acrocnema	North America	
Unsilvered fritillary	Speyeria adiaste	North America	
Variegated fritillary	Euptoieta claudia	North and South America	
Weaver's fritillary	Boloria dia	Europe	
Zerene fritillary	Speyeria zerene	North America	
