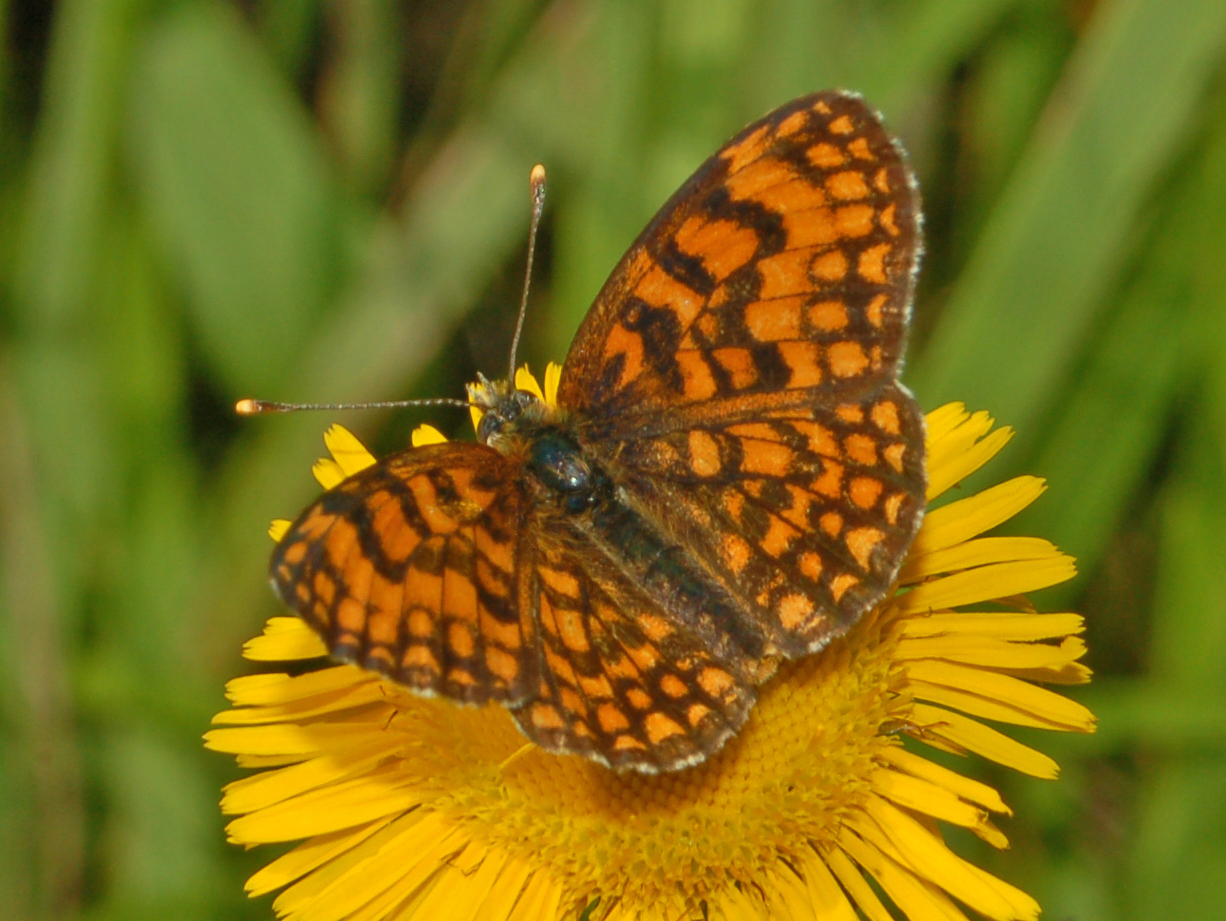
- Upperside
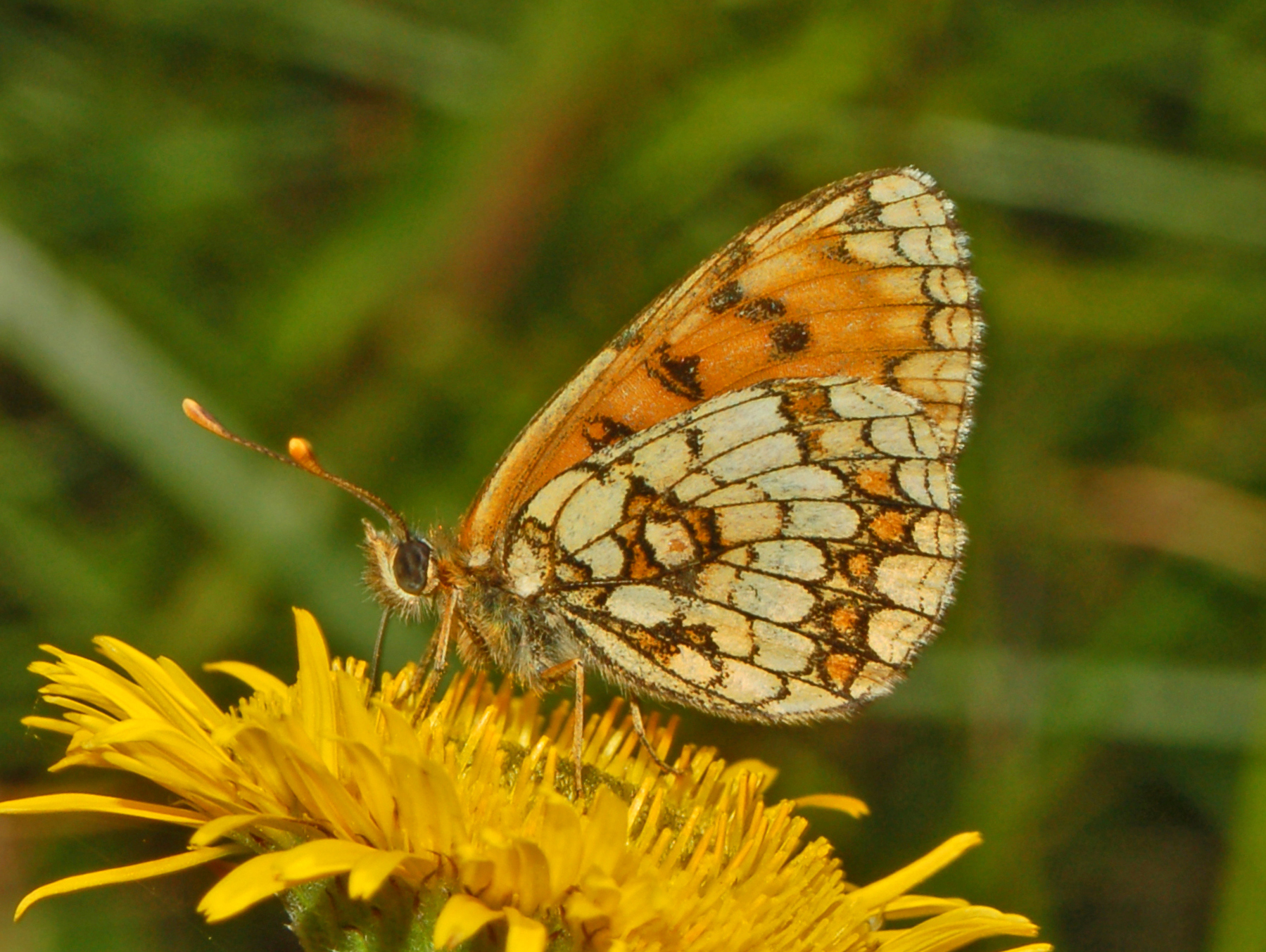
- Underside

Scientific classification
- Kingdom: Animalia
- Phylum: Arthropoda
- Clade: Pancrustacea
- Class: Insecta
- Order: Lepidoptera
- Family: Nymphalidae
- Genus: Melitaea
- Species: M. nevadensis

Binomial name
- Melitaea nevadensis Oberthür, 1904

Synonyms
- List: Mellicta athalia subsp. nevadensis (Oberthür, 1904); Melitaea dejone nevadensis Oberthür, 1904; Melitaea athalia celadussa Fruhstorfer, 1910; Melitaea athalia nevadensis Oberthür, 1904; Melitaea celadussa Fruhstorfer, 1910

= Melitaea nevadensis =

Species of butterfly

Melitaea nevadensis is a species of butterfly in the family Nymphalidae.

== Taxonomy ==
The name nevadensis originally referred to a subspecies of Melitaea deione, and later of Melitaea athalia, found in the Spanish Sierra Nevada. At the beginning of the 21st century, molecular studies (mitochondrial DNA) have determined that the Melitaea athalia populations from southwestern Europe (mostly comprising subspecies M. a. celadussa, but also M. a. nevadensis) likely constitute a separate species from the nominal M. athalia that is widespread throughout the Palaearctic region. These butterflies are distinct genetically and morphologically in the structure of the genitalia. This newly identified species has been referred to as Melitaea nevadensis, Melitaea celadussa or Melitaea helvetica.

== Distribution ==
Melitaea nevadensis replaces Melitaea athalia in the Iberian Peninsula, in southeastern France, western and southern Switzerland, and most of Italy. In France and Italy, the ranges of these two species are separated by a broad transition zone where the specimens have intermediate morphological features.

== Description ==
It has a wingspan of about 40 millimetres (1.6 in). These butterflies are golden yellow or orange, with fine black markings.

== Biology ==
Caterpillars feed on Plantago, Antirrhinum, Veronica, Linaria, Melampyrum, Digitalis and Pedicularis species.
