= Fritillary =

Fritillary may refer to:

- Fritillary (plant), a genus of flowering plants in the family Liliaceae
- Fritillary (butterfly), the name of various species in several different genera of nymphalid butterflies
