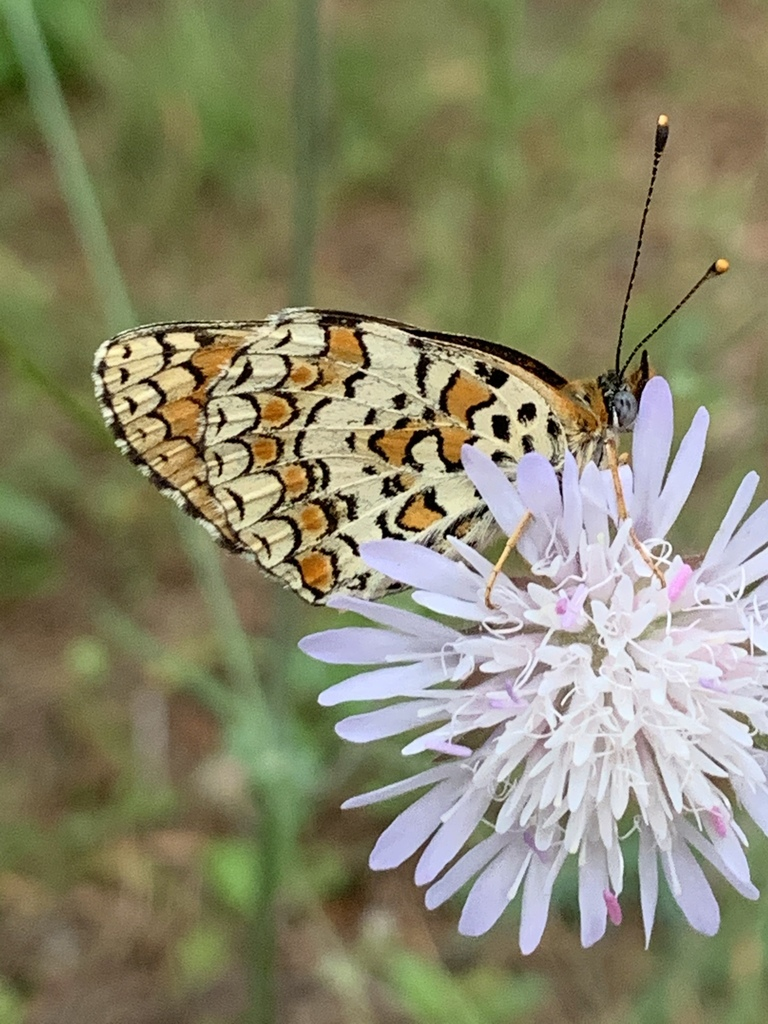

Scientific classification
- Domain: Eukaryota
- Kingdom: Animalia
- Phylum: Arthropoda
- Class: Insecta
- Order: Lepidoptera
- Family: Nymphalidae
- Genus: Melitaea
- Species: M. ornata

Binomial name
- Melitaea ornata Christoph, 1893

Synonyms
- Melitaea ogygia (Fruhstorfer, 1908)

= Melitaea ornata =

Species of butterfly

Melitaea ornata, the eastern knapweed fritillary, is a butterfly in the family Nymphalidae.

The species rank of Melitaea ornata (type locality Guberlya, Russia) was only very recently recognised by two research groups independently (Russell et al., 2005; Varga et al., 2005). They realized that there was an unrecognised species in Europe under the name of M. phoebe. The separation of this cryptic species was based on larval morphology from the fourth instar onwards.

M. phoebe larvae have a black head capsule while the larvae of this recently recognised Ponto-Mediterranean species have a brick-red head capsule (Russell et al., 2007). The separation of the two taxa was also supported by the results of enzyme electrophoresis study (Pecsenye et al., 2007). Based on these observations, the name M. telona Fruhstorfer (type locality: Jerusalem, Israel) was taken into use for this species.

In a recent molecular study, the M. phoebe group forms a monophyletic clade within the subgenus Didymaeformia (Leneveu et al., 2009). Although that study provided important results regarding the systematics of the genus, the members of the phoebe species group were poorly represented, and the need for a detailed examination of this group remained. One of the important results was the corroboration of the species rank of M. telona and the suggestion that the taxon punica (type locality: Lambessa, Algeria) may represent a separate species from both M. telona and M. phoebe. Another recent study on the morphometry of genitalia in males and females of the phoebe species group provided additional information (Tóth & Varga, 2011).

An analysis of a large number of specimens from the Palaearctic showed that Melitaea telona is not restricted to the Ponto-Mediterranean region since several new localities were found, including the Orenburg region (Russia), northern Iran and the easternmost border of Kazakhstan. Since the name ornata described by Hugo Theodor Christoph in 1893 (type locality: South-Urals, Russia) is older than the name telona, the authors began to use M. ornata as the valid name for this species following the rule of priority.

Recently, it has also been indicated that M. telona sensu stricto from Israel and M. ornata are different taxa (Tóth et al. 2014). Previous morphometrical studies have already revealed small differences in the genital structures of the males (Tóth et al. 2013; Tóth and Varga 2011) but the authors interpreted the difference as a well-pronounced intra-specific difference. In contrast, molecular data clearly showed that the two taxa are genetically distinct from each other. Based on the results of the analysis of seven genes, Tóth et al. (2014) concluded that M. telona is not a subspecies of M. ornata but a species in its own right.

M. ornata larvae have a brick-red head from the fourth larval instar and they are monophagous or oligophagous, feeding on different Asteraceae species, mainly on regionally different, sometime local endemic Centaurea species. M. phoebe on the other hand is oligophagous, and its head capsule is always black.

== Bibliography ==
- János Pál Tóth, Zoltán Varga Morphometric study on the genitalia of sibling species Melitaea phoebe and M. telona (Lepidoptera: Nymphalidae)
- Russell, P., Tennent, W.J., Pateman, J., Varga, Z., Benyamini, D., Pe'er, G., Bálint, Z. & Gascoigne-Pees, M. (2007) Further investigations into Melitaea telona Frushstorfer, 1908 (=ogygia Frushstorfer, 1908 =emipunica Verity, 1919) (Lepidoptera: Nymphalidae), with observations on biology and distribution. Entomologist's Gazette, 58, 137–166.
- Russell, P., J., P., Gascoigne-Pees, M. & Tennent, W.J. (2005) Melitaea emipunia (Verity, 1919) stat. nov: a hitherto unrecognised butterfly species from Europe (Lepidoptera: Nymphalidae). Entomologist's Gazette, 56, 67–70.
- Pecsenye, K., Bereczki, J., Tóth, A., Meglécz, E., Peregovits, L., Juhász, E. & Varga, Z. (2007) A poulációstruktúra és a genetikai variabilitás kapcsolata védett nappalilepke-fajainknál. In: A Kárpát-medence állatvilágának kialakulása. MTM, Budapest, pp. 241–260.
