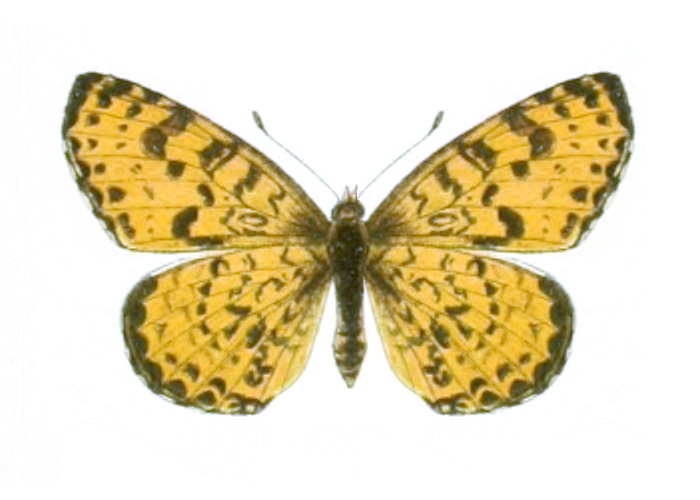

Scientific classification
- Domain: Eukaryota
- Kingdom: Animalia
- Phylum: Arthropoda
- Class: Insecta
- Order: Lepidoptera
- Family: Nymphalidae
- Genus: Melitaea
- Species: M. didymoides

Binomial name
- Melitaea didymoides Eversmann, 1847

Synonyms
- Melitaea sibirica Staudinger, 1861 (nomen nudum); Melitaea sibirica [Heyne], [1893] (preocc.); Melitaea mandschurica Seitz, [1909] (preocc.); Melitaea seitzi Matsumura, 1929; Melitaea mandschukoana Bryk, 1940; Melitaea cansicola Bryk, 1940

= Melitaea didymoides =

Species of butterfly

Melitaea didymoides is a butterfly of the family Nymphalidae. It is found in Russia (Transbaikalia to the Amur and Ussuri regions) as well as in Mongolia and China. The habitat consists of dry meadows and xerothermic slopes with thin vegetation.

Adults are on wing from June to July.

== Subspecies ==
- Melitaea didymoides didymoides (southern Tuva, Transbaikalia, Amur)
- Melitaea didymoides yagakuana Matsumura, 1927 (southern Ussuri)
- Melitaea didymoides pekinensis Seitz, [1909] (northern China)
- Melitaea didymoides latonia Grum-Grshimailo, 1891 (central China)
- Melitaea didymoides eupatides Fruhstorfer, 1917 (Gansu)
- Melitaea didymoides hummeli Bryk, 1940 (southern Mongolia)
