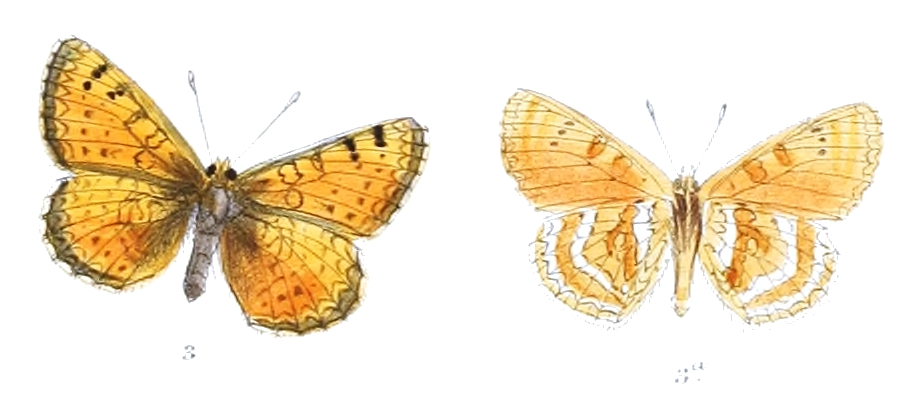

Scientific classification
- Kingdom: Animalia
- Phylum: Arthropoda
- Class: Insecta
- Order: Lepidoptera
- Family: Nymphalidae
- Genus: Melitaea
- Species: M. sindura

Binomial name
- Melitaea sindura Moore, 1865

Synonyms
- Mellicta sindura

= Melitaea sindura =

Species of butterfly

Melitaea sindura is a butterfly of the family Nymphalidae. It is found in Kashmir, Chitral and Tibet. It was described by Frederic Moore in 1865. It is monotypic.

== Description ==
The underside hindwing is pale yellow or tawny with white black-edged bands. There are conical submarginal pale spots on the upperside. The abdomen is black and the cilia is white and spotted with black.
