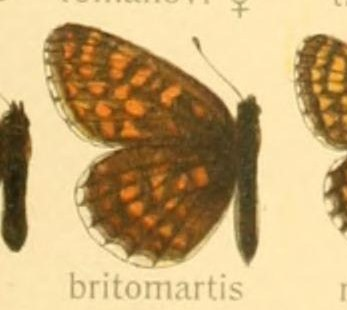
- In Adalbert Seitz

Scientific classification
- Domain: Eukaryota
- Kingdom: Animalia
- Phylum: Arthropoda
- Class: Insecta
- Order: Lepidoptera
- Family: Nymphalidae
- Genus: Melitaea
- Species: M. britomartis

Binomial name
- Melitaea britomartis Assmann, 1847

Synonyms
- Mellicta britomartis (Assmann, 1847)

= Melitaea britomartis =

Assmann's fritillary

Species of butterfly

Melitaea britomartis, or Assmann's fritillary, is a butterfly in the family Nymphalidae. It has a wide geographic range and is represented by three subspecies.

- M. b. britomartis Europe including the Balkans and Italy to North Kazakhstan and Altai
- M. b. amurensis (Staudinger, 1892) Altais to Amur
- M. b. latefascia (Fixsen, 1887) South Ussuri, Korea, North East China

== Description ==
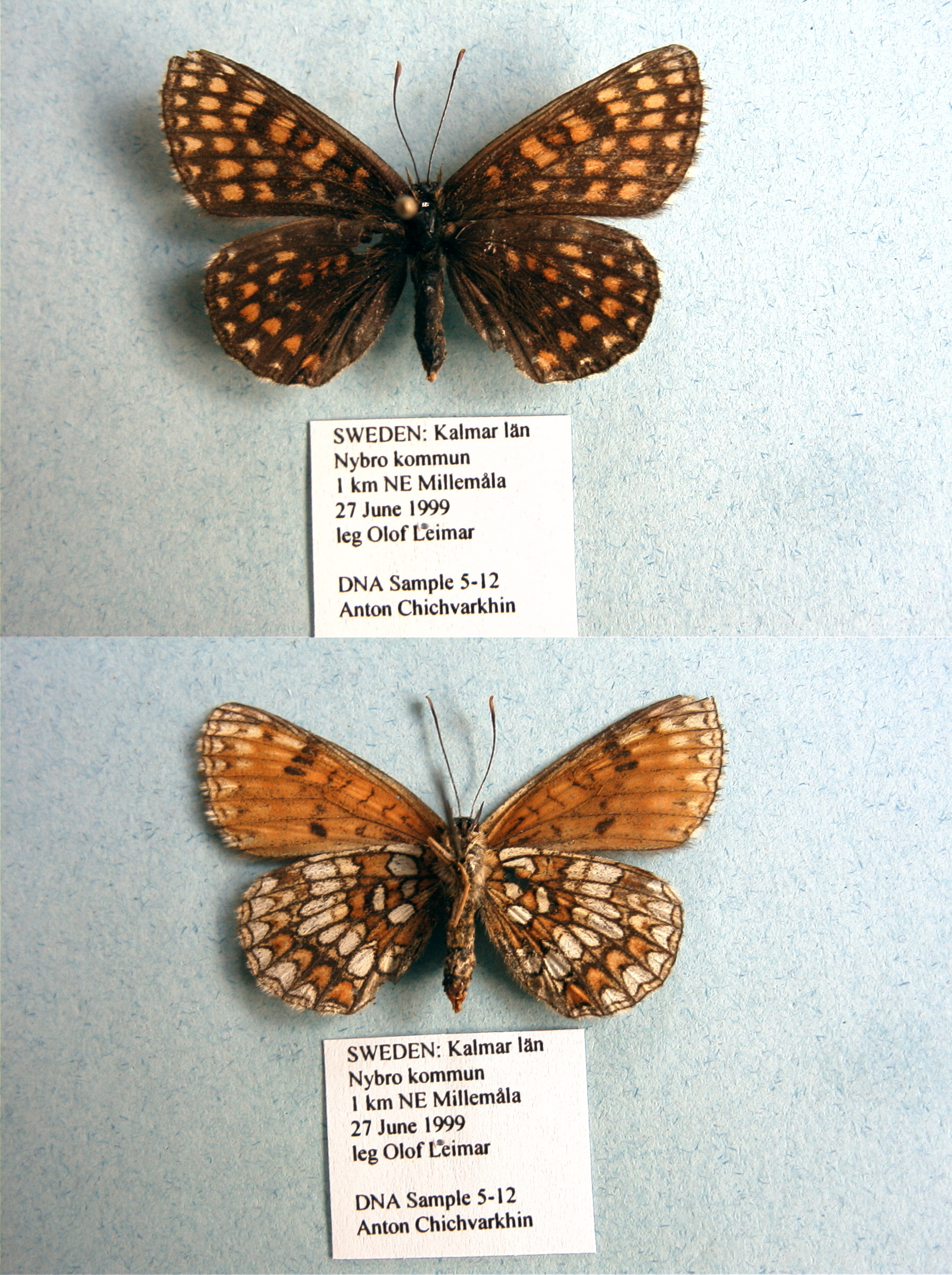

britomartis Assmann (66h), britomartis though connected with the nymotypical form of Melitaea aurelia by all intergradations, is easily recognized by its facies. The black is more regularly arranged above, and the reddish yellow spots within this network differ less in size from each other, the spots of the same row being usually of equal size, whereas in nymotypical aurelia a row mostly contains quite small spots of the ground-colour beside large ones, others disappearing altogether. A reliable distinction between britomartis and aurelia appears to be afforded by the colour and shape of the larva.

== Biology ==
The larva feeds on species of Plantago and Veronica.

== Etymology ==
Named in the Classical tradition Britomar in Greek mythology is a Cretan goddess, patroness of fishermen and sailors, companion of Artemis.
