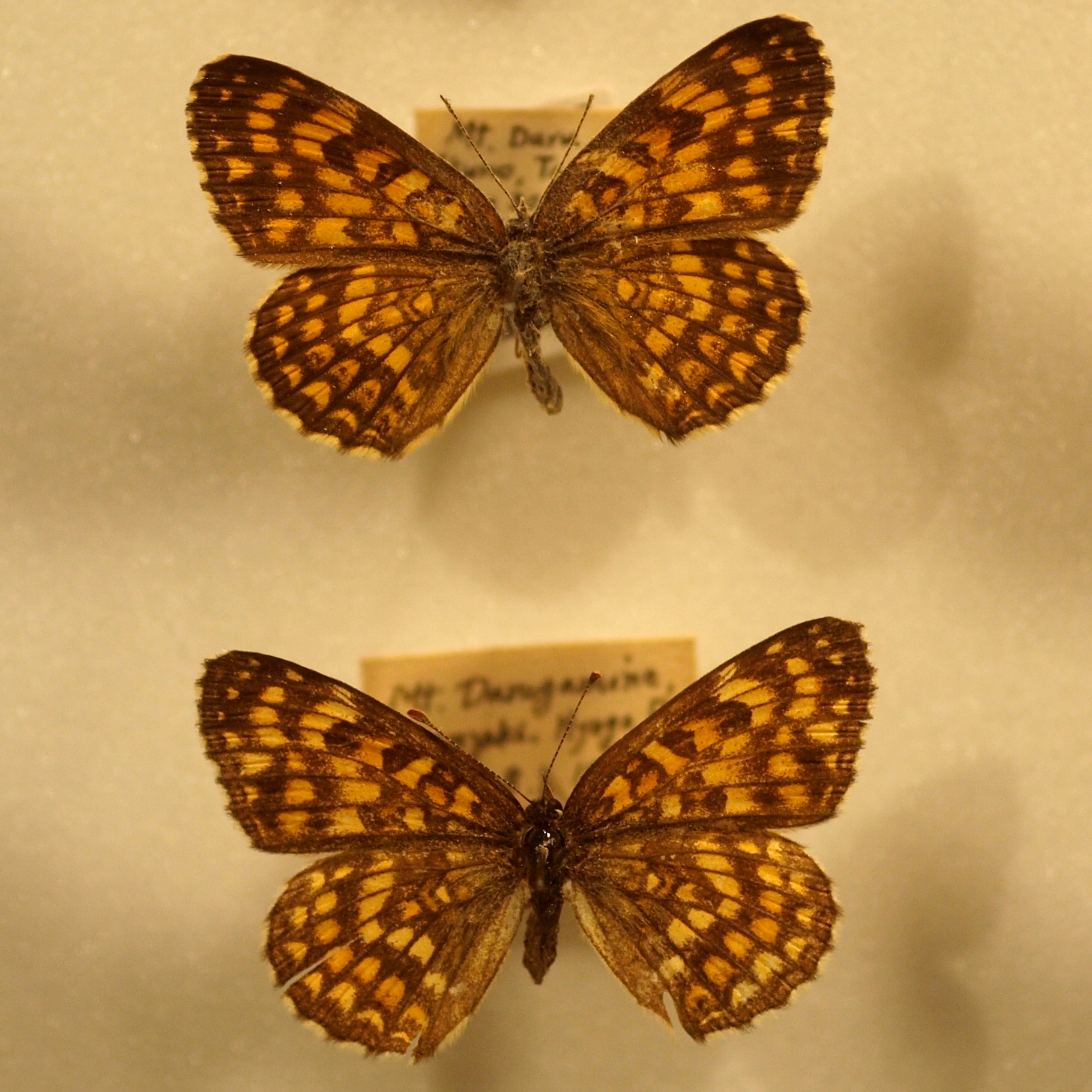

Scientific classification
- Domain: Eukaryota
- Kingdom: Animalia
- Phylum: Arthropoda
- Class: Insecta
- Order: Lepidoptera
- Family: Nymphalidae
- Genus: Melitaea
- Species: M. ambrisia

Binomial name
- Melitaea ambrisia Higgins, 1935

Synonyms
- Didymaeformia ambrisia (Higgins, 1935)

= Melitaea ambrisia =

Species of butterfly

Melitaea ambrisia is a butterfly of the family Nymphalidae. It is found in a restricted area of the mountain ranges of Central Asia. The habitat consists of flowering meadows, forest edges and clearings.

== Subspecies ==
- Melitaea ambrisia alraschid
- Melitaea ambrisia ambrisia
