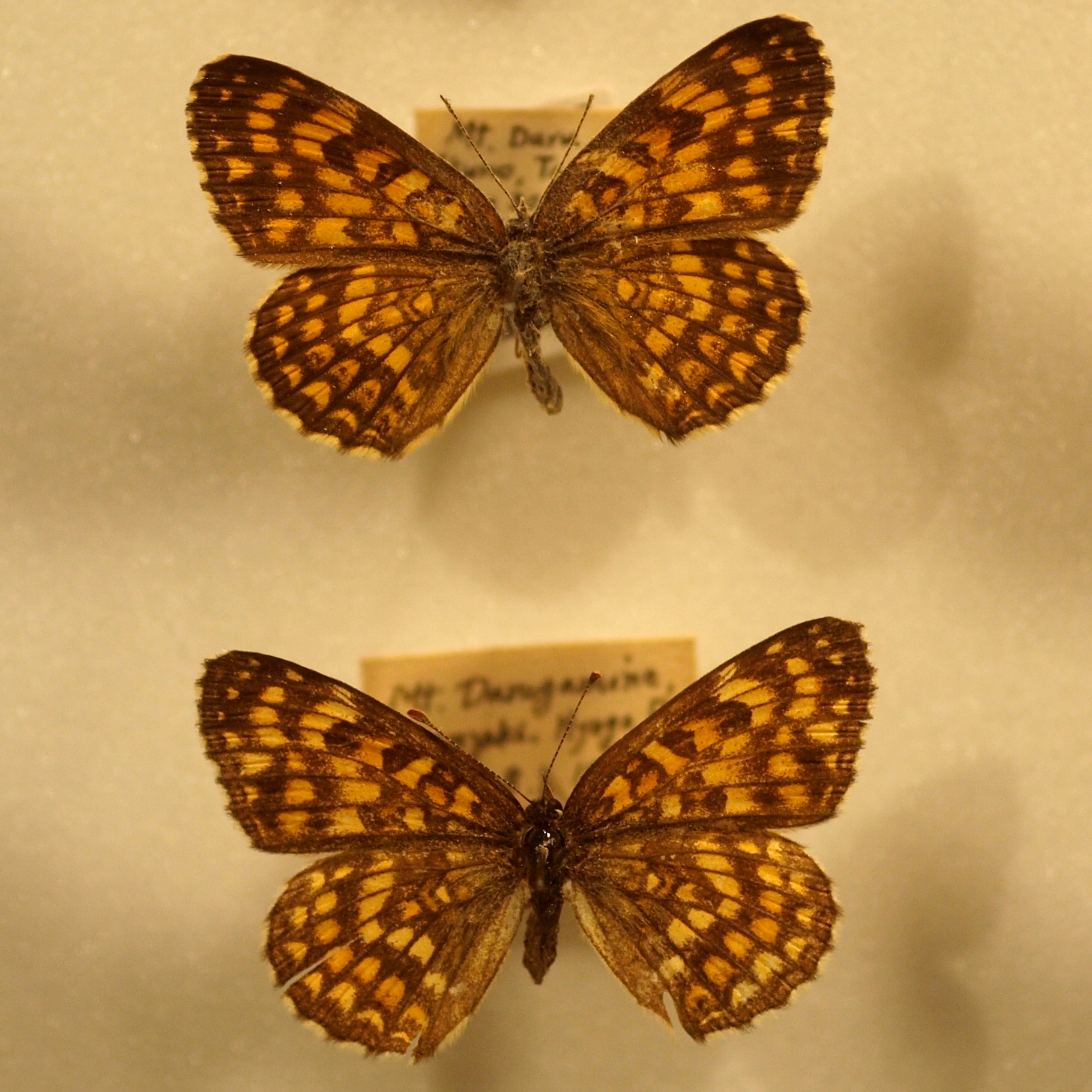

Scientific classification
- Domain: Eukaryota
- Kingdom: Animalia
- Phylum: Arthropoda
- Class: Insecta
- Order: Lepidoptera
- Family: Nymphalidae
- Genus: Melitaea
- Species: M. protomedia

Binomial name
- Melitaea protomedia (Ménétriés, 1859)

Synonyms
- Melitaea protomedia f. argentea Fixsen, 1887

= Melitaea protomedia =

Species of butterfly

Melitaea protomedia is a butterfly of the family Nymphalidae. It is found in the Amur River basin in Russia and from central and eastern China to Korea and Japan. The habitat consists of flowering meadows, forest edges and clearings.

Adults are on wing from July to August.

The larvae feed on Veronica species.

== Subspecies ==
- Melitaea protomedia protomedia (Russia)
- Melitaea protomedia regama Fruhstorfer, 1915 (China to Korea and Japan)
