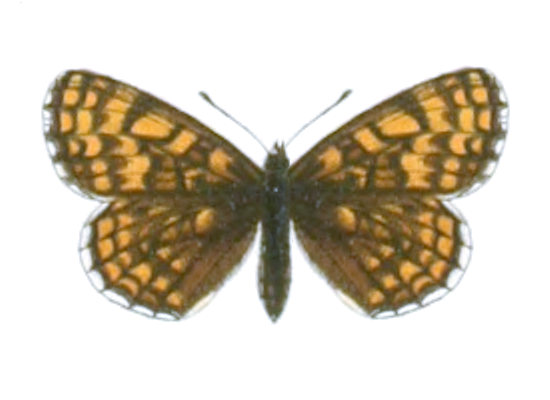

Scientific classification
- Domain: Eukaryota
- Kingdom: Animalia
- Phylum: Arthropoda
- Class: Insecta
- Order: Lepidoptera
- Family: Nymphalidae
- Genus: Melitaea
- Species: M. centralasiae

Binomial name
- Melitaea centralasiae (Wnukowsky, 1929)

Synonyms
- Mellicta centralasiae Wnukowsky, 1929; Melitaea mongolica Staudinger, 1892 (preocc.)

= Melitaea centralasiae =

Species of butterfly

Melitaea centralasiae is a butterfly of the family Nymphalidae. It is found in eastern Russia (eastern Altai, Sayan, Tuva, Transbaikalia, Amur, Yakutia and Magadan) and northern Mongolia.
