= Melitaea abyssinica =

Scientific classification
- Kingdom: Animalia
- Phylum: Arthropoda
- Class: Insecta
- Order: Lepidoptera
- Family: Nymphalidae
- Genus: Melitaea
- Species: M. abyssinica

Binomial name
- Melitaea abyssinica Oberthür, 1909

Synonyms
- Melitaea didyma f. abyssinica Oberthür, 1909

Species of butterfly

Melitaea abyssinica is a butterfly in the family Nymphalidae. It is found in Ethiopia.
