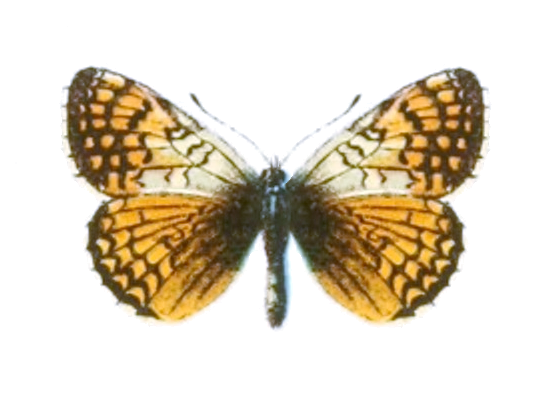

Scientific classification
- Domain: Eukaryota
- Kingdom: Animalia
- Phylum: Arthropoda
- Class: Insecta
- Order: Lepidoptera
- Family: Nymphalidae
- Genus: Melitaea
- Species: M. solona

Binomial name
- Melitaea solona Alphéraky, 1881

= Melitaea solona =

Species of butterfly

Melitaea solona is a butterfly of the family Nymphalidae. It is found in the Tian Shan mountains, Tibet, Alai and Trans-Alay regions.

== Subspecies ==
- Melitaea solona solona (eastern Tian Shan, western Tibet)
- Melitaea solona filipjevi Churkin, Kolesnichenko & Tuzov, 2000 (northern Tian Shan: Zailiisky Alatau Mountains)
- Melitaea solona plyushchi Churkin, Kolesnichenko & Tuzov, 2000 (central Tian Shan: Sary-Dzhaz, Kokshaal-Tau)
- Melitaea solona pletnevi Churkin, Kolesnichenko & Tuzov, 2000 (eastern Alai, Inner Tian Shan)
- Melitaea solona evadne Hemming, 1934 (eastern Transalai)
