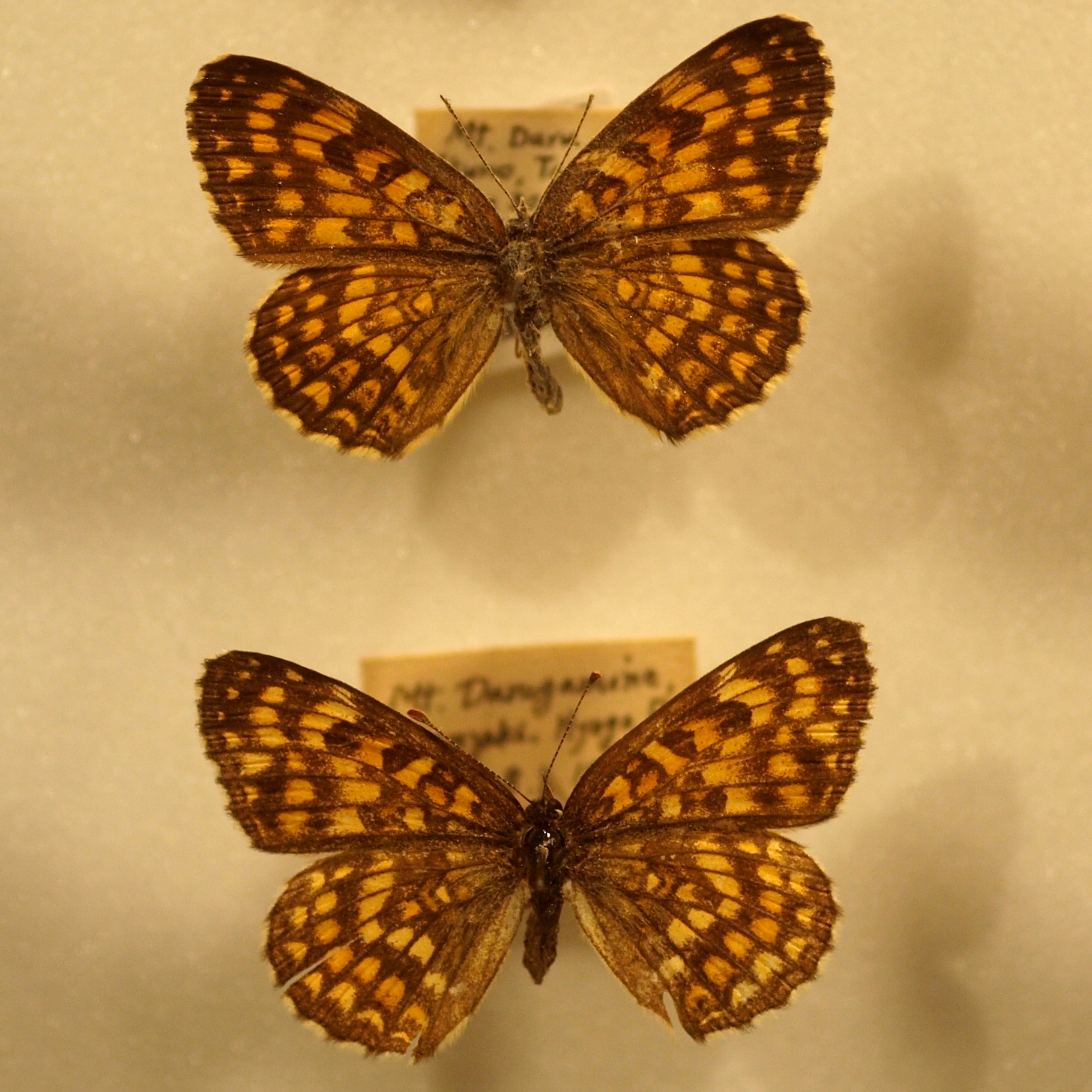

Scientific classification
- Domain: Eukaryota
- Kingdom: Animalia
- Phylum: Arthropoda
- Class: Insecta
- Order: Lepidoptera
- Family: Nymphalidae
- Genus: Melitaea
- Species: M. ninae

Binomial name
- Melitaea ninae (Sheljuzhko, 1935)

Synonyms
- Melitaea rosea Higgins, 1938

= Melitaea ninae =

Species of butterfly

Melitaea ninae is a butterfly of the family Nymphalidae. It is found in a restricted area of western Tian-Shan.
