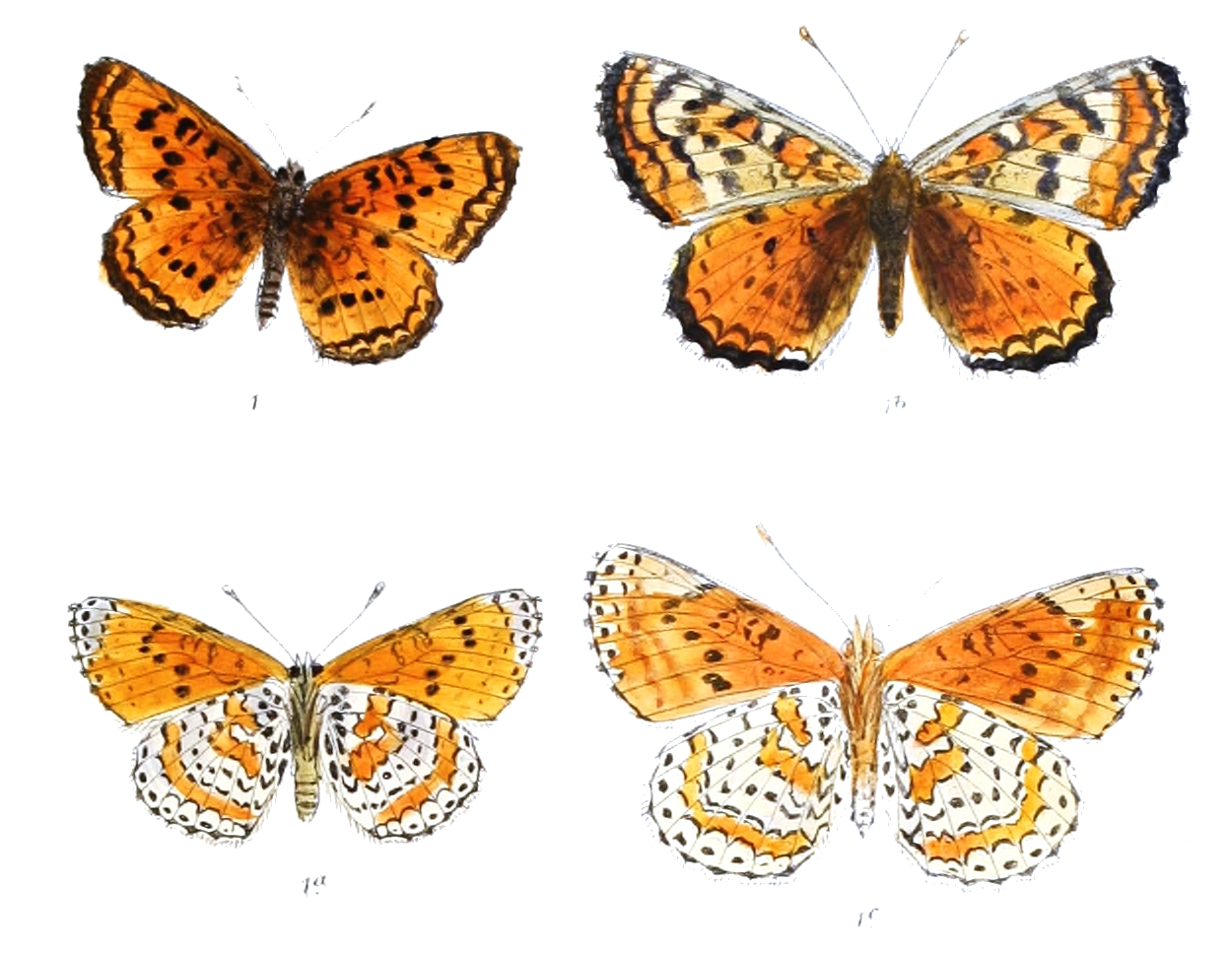

Scientific classification
- Domain: Eukaryota
- Kingdom: Animalia
- Phylum: Arthropoda
- Class: Insecta
- Order: Lepidoptera
- Family: Nymphalidae
- Genus: Melitaea
- Species: M. chitralensis

Binomial name
- Melitaea chitralensis Moore, 1901

Synonyms
- Melitaea didyma chitralipluvia Verity, 1929

= Melitaea chitralensis =

Species of butterfly

Melitaea chitralensis is a butterfly of the family Nymphalidae. It is found in Kashmir and Chitral.
