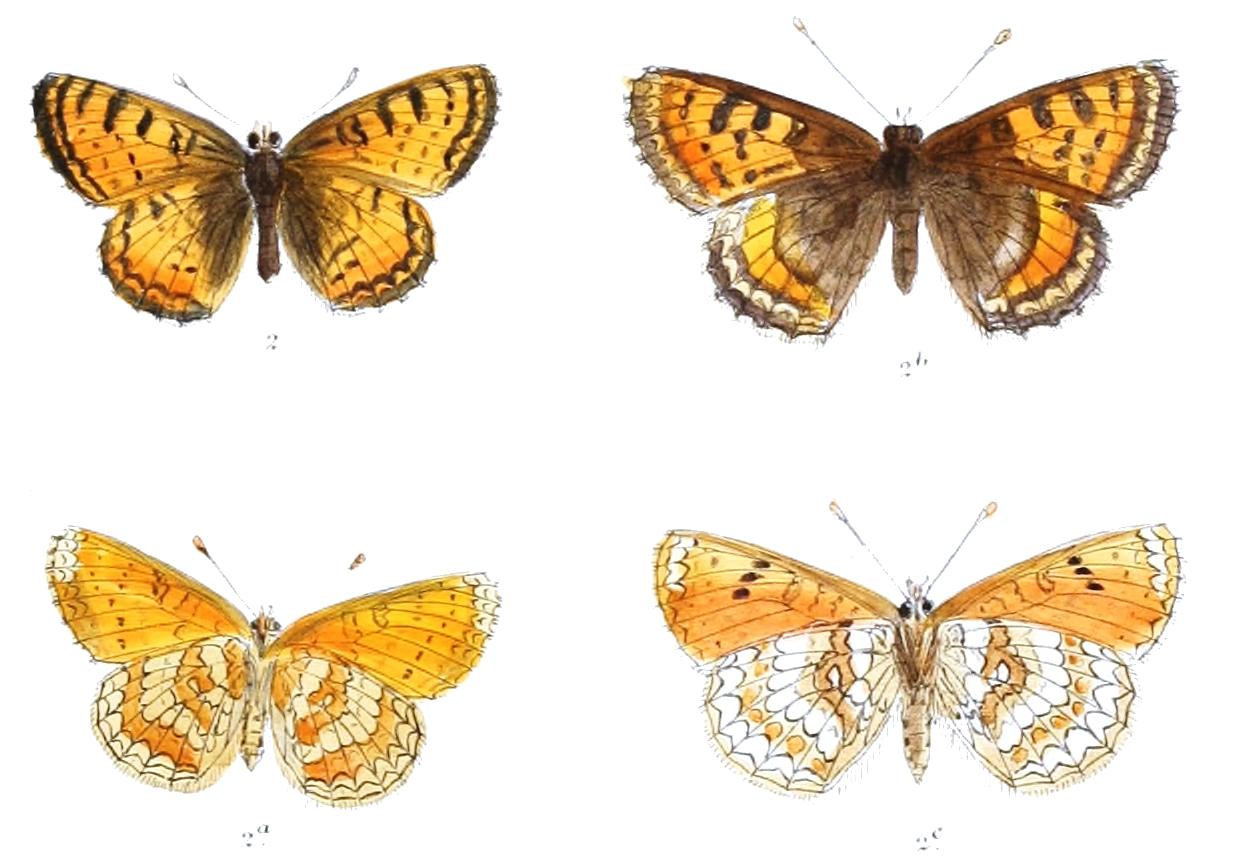

Scientific classification
- Domain: Eukaryota
- Kingdom: Animalia
- Phylum: Arthropoda
- Class: Insecta
- Order: Lepidoptera
- Family: Nymphalidae
- Genus: Melitaea
- Species: M. balbita

Binomial name
- Melitaea balbita Moore, 1874

Synonyms
- Mellicta balbita

= Melitaea balbita =

Species of butterfly

Melitaea balbita is a butterfly of the family Nymphalidae. It is found in Pakistan and the western Himalayas.
