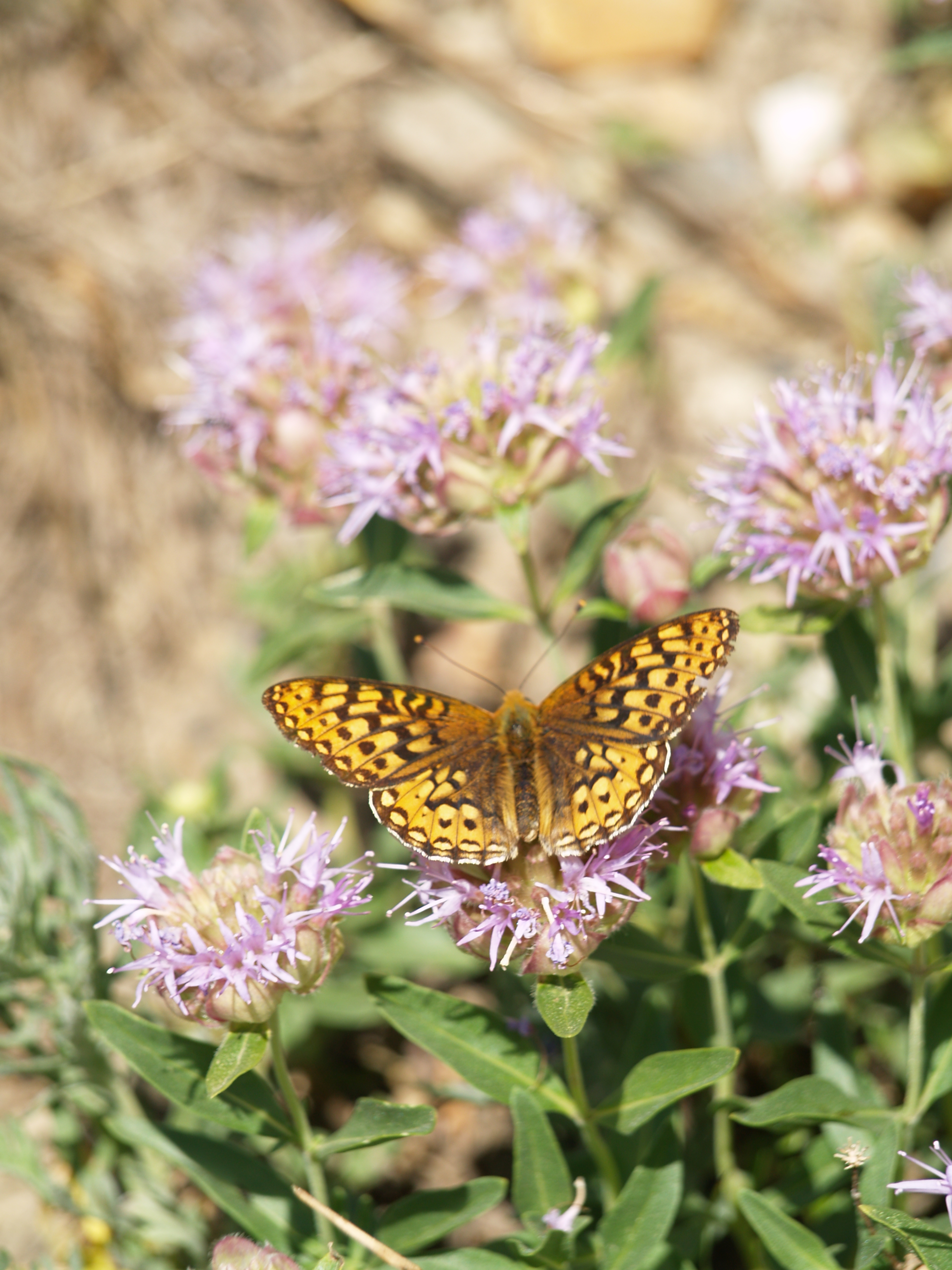

Scientific classification
- Kingdom: Animalia
- Phylum: Arthropoda
- Clade: Pancrustacea
- Class: Insecta
- Order: Lepidoptera
- Family: Nymphalidae
- Genus: Speyeria
- Species: S. egleis

Binomial name
- Speyeria egleis (Behr, 1862)

Synonyms
- Argynnis egleis Behr, 1862; Argynnis egleis Boisduval, 1869; Argynnis montivaga Behr, 1863; Argynnis astarte Edwards, 1864 (preocc. Doubleday, 1847); Argynnis montivaga ab. mammothi Gunder, 1924; Argynnis montivaga tr. f. boharti Gunder, 1929; Argynnis egleis Boisduval, 1869; Argynnis utahensis linda dos Passos & Grey, 1942; Speyeria montiviga secreta dos Passos & Grey, 1945; Argynnis utahensis Skinner, 1919; Argynnis montivaga var. tehachapina J. A. Comstock, 1920; Argynnis oweni Edwards, 1892; Argynnis macdunnoughi Gunder, 1932; Argynnis albrighti Gunder, 1932; Argynnis utahensis linda dos Passos & Grey, 1942

= Speyeria egleis =

Great Basin fritillary

Species of butterfly

Speyeria egleis, commonly known as the Great Basin fritillary or egleis fritillary, is a butterfly of the family Nymphalidae. It is found in the United States, where it has been recorded from North Dakota southwest through Oregon to California and south to Colorado. The habitat consists of mountain meadows, forest openings and exposed rocky ridges.

The wingspan is 45–60 mm. The wings are bright to dull orange brown with dark markings. Adults are on wing from late June to August.

The larvae feed on the leaves of Viola species, including V. adunca, V. nuttallii, V. purpurea, and V. walteri.

== Subspecies ==
- S. e. egleis
- S. e. albrighti (Gunder, 1932) (Montana)
- S. e. linda (dos Passos & Grey, 1942) (Idaho)
- S. e. macdunnoughi (Gunder, 1932) (Montana)
- S. e. mattooni J. Emmel & T. Emmel, 1998 (California)
- S. e. moecki Hammond & Dornfeld, 1983 (Oregon)
- S. e. oweni (Edwards, 1892) (California)
- S. e. reidi Austin, 1998 (Nevada)
- S. e. secreta dos Passos & Grey, 1945 (Colorado)
- S. e. tehachapina (Comstock, 1920) (California)
- S. e. toiyabe Howe, 1975 (Nevada)
- S. e. utahensis (Skinner, 1919) (Utah)
- S. e. yolaboli J. Emmel & T. Emmel, 1998 (California)

S. e. atossa and S. e. clemencei are now treated as subspecies of Speyeria adiaste.
