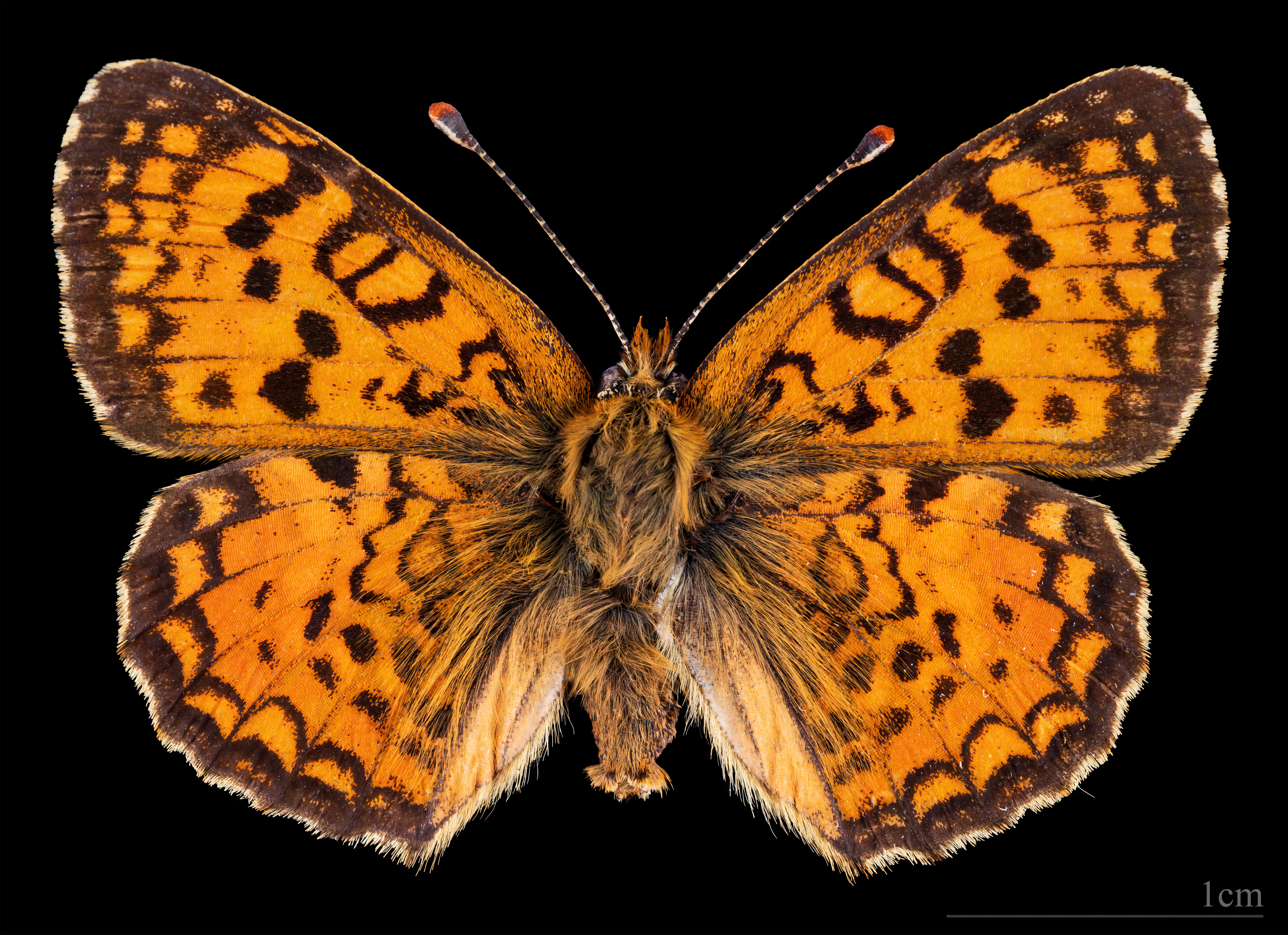
- Male

Scientific classification
- Kingdom: Animalia
- Phylum: Arthropoda
- Clade: Pancrustacea
- Class: Insecta
- Order: Lepidoptera
- Family: Nymphalidae
- Genus: Melitaea
- Species: M. aetherie

Binomial name
- Melitaea aetherie (Hübner, 1826)

Synonyms
- Melitaea aetherea (lapsus); Melitaea aetheria (lapsus); Melitaea aetheriae (lapsus)

= Aetherie fritillary =

Species of butterfly

The aetherie fritillary (Melitaea aetherie) is a butterfly in the family Nymphalidae.

== Distribution ==
It is found locally in mountain areas of North Africa and very locally in southern Spain, southern Portugal, Sicily and southern Italy.

== Biology ==
The insect flies from mid-April until the end of May with a second generation in September in Italy. The habitat is open grasslands and flowery meadows. The larvae feed on various Centaurea knapweeds. The flowers of Centaurea also attract the nectar-feeding adults.

== Description ==
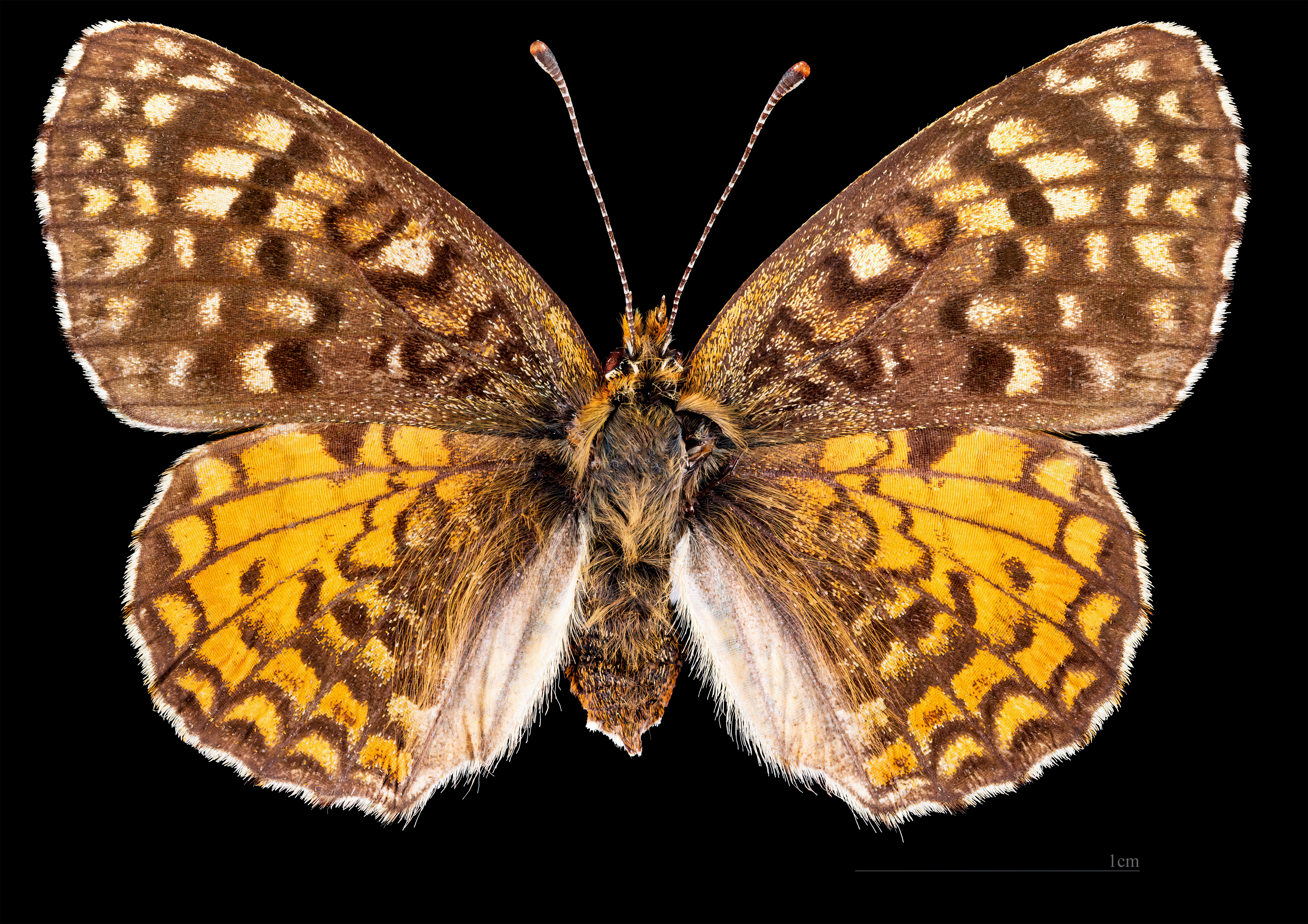
♀

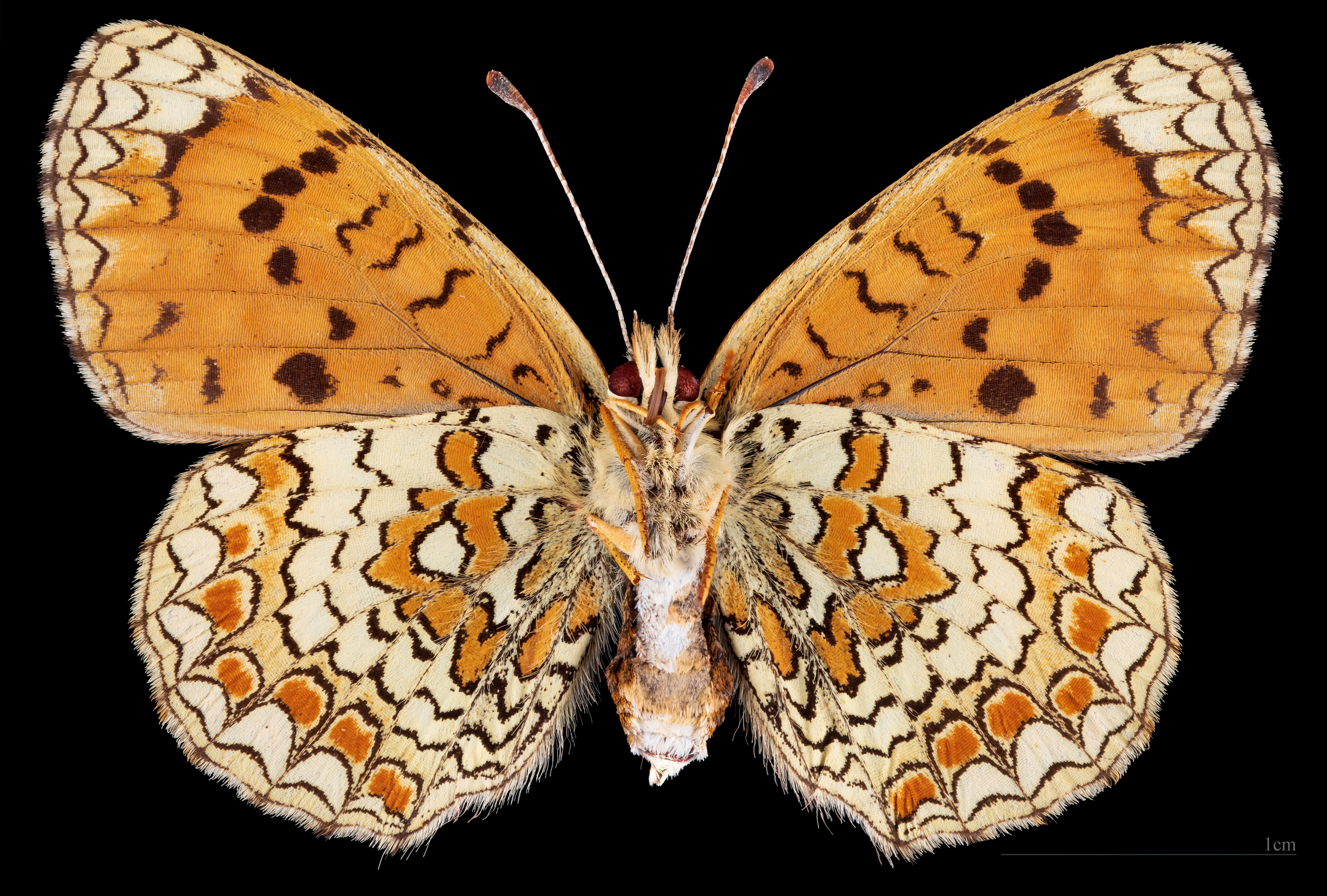
♀ On the upper side, there is a discal band and a row of well separated round spots. The post discal band is very lightly marked in the male. The hind wing post discal row lacks black spots. The upper sides ground color is very uniform.
