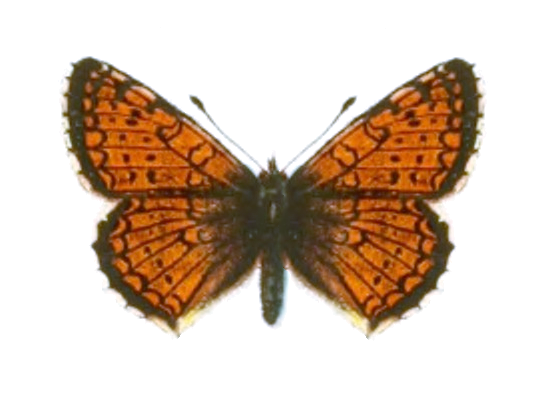
- Adult male Melitaea arcesia chuana, a member of Melitaea sensu stricto

Scientific classification
- Kingdom: Animalia
- Phylum: Arthropoda
- Clade: Pancrustacea
- Class: Insecta
- Order: Lepidoptera
- Family: Nymphalidae
- Subfamily: Nymphalinae
- Tribe: Melitaeini
- Subtribe: Melitaeina; Newman, 1870
- Genus: Melitaea; Fabricius, 1807

Type species
- Papilio cinxia Linnaeus, 1758

Diversity
- Some 85 species (but see text)

Synonyms
- Athaliaeformia Verity, 1950; Cinclidia Hübner, [1819] Didymaeformia Verity, 1950; Lucina Rafinesque, 1815 (non Bruguière, [1797]: preoccupied); Melilaea (lapsus); Melinaea Sodoffsky, 1837 (non Hübner, 1816: preoccupied); Melitea (lapsus; non Peron & Lesueur, 1810: preoccupied); Melithea (lapsus); Melithoea (lapsus); Melitoea (lapsus); Mellicta Billberg, 1820; Schoenis Hübner, [1819]

= Melitaea =

Genus of butterflies

Melitaea is a genus of brush-footed butterflies (family Nymphalidae). They are here placed in the tribe Melitaeini of subfamily Nymphalinae; some authors elevate this tribe to subfamily rank.

As delimited here, Melitaea includes the genus Mellicta, making the subtribe Melitaeina monotypic (but see below). For long, it was believed that Mellicta was a junior objective synonym of Melitaea, sharing the same type species (the Glanville fritillary, M. cinxia). This was in error, however; the type species of Mellicta is actually the heath fritillary (M. athalia), making the two taxa junior subjective synonyms and thus eligible to be separated again. However, several other taxa are in fact objective synonyms (or at least have type specimens belonging to the same biological species) of Melitaea and Mellicta – Schoenis and the preoccupied Lucina and Melinaea for the former, Athaliaeformia for the latter.

== Taxonomy ==
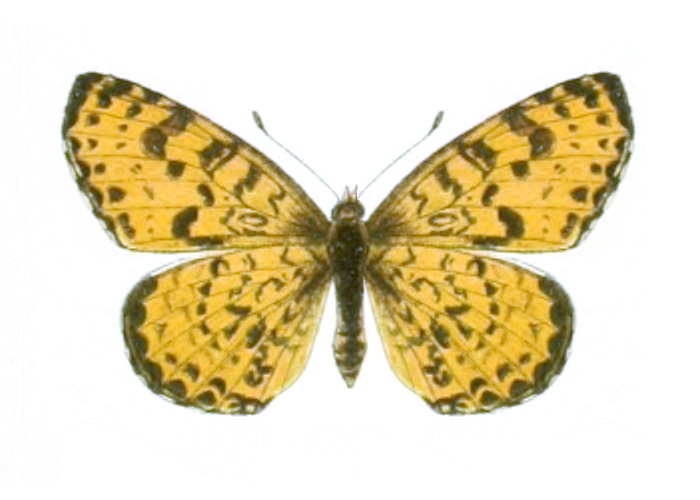
Adult Melitaea didymoides pekinensis, belonging to the large didyma group

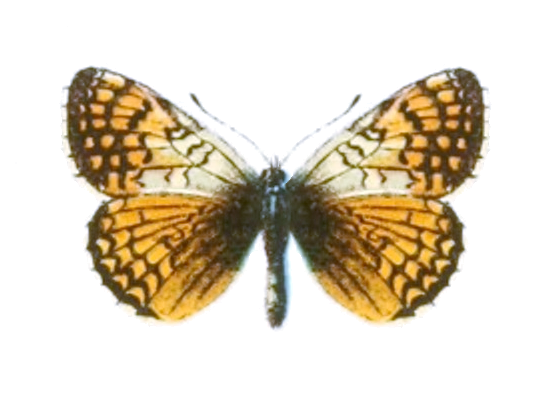
Adult Melitaea solona evadne (minerva group)

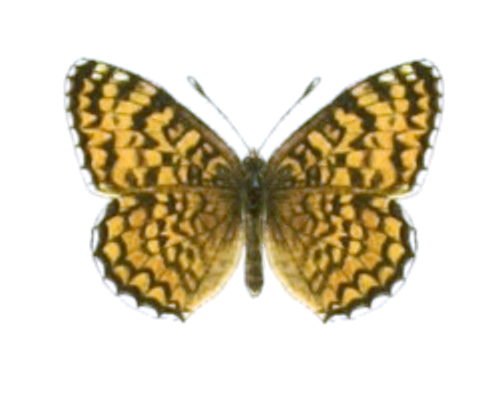
Adult male Melitaea punica (phoebe group)

As noted above, Mellicta is considered to be a subgenus of Melitaea for the time being. The rationale is that even though the Melitaeina may not be monotypic, they do not seem to consist of just two genera (Melitaea and Mellicta) either, and recognition of Mellicta appears to leave Melitaea paraphyletic; consequently, other lineages would need elevation to distinct genus status also. As long as it is not fully known which species groups and/or subgenera warrant recognition as full genera, they are all retained in the present genus.

=== Species ===
In the following list, species-group/subgenus affiliation and type species are annotated. In the sensu lato circumscription used here, Melitaea contains almost ninety species. Most being assignable to one of the five groups/subgenera, there are a few that cannot be clearly placed with one of these at present:

didyma/Didymaeformia group

- Melitaea abyssinica Oberthür, 1909
- Melitaea acraeina (Staudinger, 1886)
- Melitaea agar Oberthür, 1888
- Melitaea ala Staudinger, 1881
- Melitaea alraschid Higgins, 1941
- Melitaea ambrisia Higgins, 1935
- Melitaea arduinna (Esper, 1783) – Freyer's fritillary
- Melitaea athene Staudinger, 1881
- Melitaea avinovi Sheljuzhko, 1914
- Melitaea casta (Kollar, [1848])
- Melitaea chitralensis Moore, 1901
- Melitaea deserticola Oberthür, 1909 – desert fritillary
- Melitaea didyma (Esper, 1778) – spotted fritillary, red-band fritillary (type of Didymaeformis)
- Melitaea didymina Staudinger, 1895
- Melitaea didymoides Eversmann, 1847
- Melitaea enarea Fruhstorfer, 1917
- Melitaea fergana Staudinger, 1882
- Melitaea infernalis Grum-Grshimailo, 1891
- Melitaea interrupta Kolenati, 1846
- Melitaea jitka Weiss & Major, 2000
- Melitaea kotshubeji Sheljuzhko, 1929
- Melitaea latonigena Eversmann, 1847
- Melitaea lunulata Staudinger, 1901
- Melitaea lutko Evans, 1932
- Melitaea meherparvari Carbonell, 2007
- Melitaea mimetica Higgins, 1940
- Melitaea mixta Evans, 1912
- Melitaea ninae Sheljuzhko, 1935
- Melitaea persea Kollar, [1850]
- Melitaea pseudoala Sheljuzhko, 1928
- Melitaea robertsi Butler, 1880 – Baluchi fritillary
- Melitaea romanovi Grum-Grshimailo, 1891
- Melitaea sarvistana Wiltshire, 1941
- Melitaea saxatilis Christoff, 1876
- Melitaea shandura Evans, 1924
- Melitaea sutschana Staudinger, 1892
- Melitaea trivia Denis & Schiffermüller, 1775 – lesser spotted fritillary, desert fritillary
- Melitaea yuenty Oberthür, 1888

cinxia/Melitaea sensu stricto group

- Melitaea amoenula C. & R.Felder, [1867]
- Melitaea arcesia Bremer, 1861 – blackvein fritillary
- Melitaea balbita Moore, 1874
- Melitaea bellona Leech, [1892]
- Melitaea cinxia (Linnaeus, 1758) – Glanville fritillary (type of Melitaea)
- Melitaea diamina (Lang, 1789) – false-heath fritillary
- Melitaea jezabel Oberthür, 1888
- Melitaea protomedia Ménétriés, 1859
- Melitaea sindura Moore, 1865

minerva group

- Melitaea asteroidea Staudinger, 1881
- Melitaea balba Evans, 1912
- Melitaea elisabethae Avinoff, 1910
- Melitaea ludmilla Churkin, Kolesnichenko & Tuzov, 2000
- Melitaea minerva Staudinger, 1881
- Melitaea pallas Staudinger, 1886
- Melitaea solona Alphéraky, 1881
- Melitaea sultanensis Staudinger, 1886
- Melitaea turanica Erschoff, 1874

phoebe/Cinclidia group

- Melitaea aetherie (Hübner, 1826) – aetherie fritillary
- Melitaea collina Lederer, 1861
- Melitaea consulis Wiltshire, 1941
- Melitaea gina Higgins, 1941
- Melitaea kuchi Wyatt, 1961
- Melitaea ornata Christoph, 1893 (formerly in M. phoebe or M. punica, here as broad concept including telona Fruhstorfer, 1908, klili Benyamini, 2021, etc.)
- Melitaea phoebe Denis & Schiffermüller, 1775 – knapweed fritillary (type of Cinclidia)
- Melitaea pseudosibina Alberti, 1969
- Melitaea punica Oberthür, 1876
- Melitaea scotosia Butler, 1878
- Melitaea sibina Alphéraky, 1881
- Melitaea turkmanica Higgins, 1940

Mellicta group

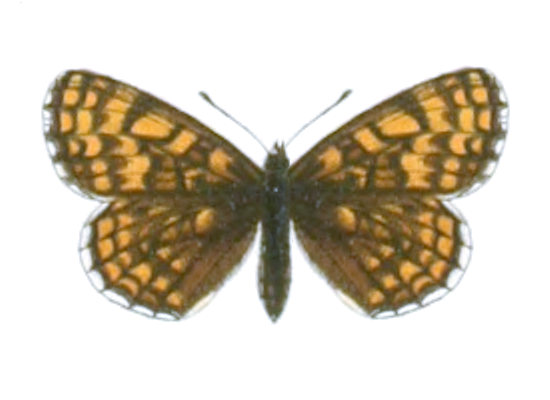
Adult Melitaea centralasiae of the Mellicta group

- Melitaea alatauica Staudinger, 1881
- Melitaea ambigua Ménétriés in Schrenck, 1859
- Melitaea asteria (Freyer, 1828) – little fritillary
- Melitaea athalia (Rottemburg, 1775) – heath fritillary (type of Mellicta)
- Melitaea aurelia Nickerl, 1850 – Nickerl's fritillary
- Melitaea britomartis Assmann, 1847 – Assmann's fritillary
- Melitaea caucasogenita Verity, 1930
- Melitaea centralasiae (Wnukowsky, 1929) (sometimes in M. menetriesi)
- Melitaea deione Geyer, 1832 – Provençal fritillary
- Melitaea menetriesi Caradja, 1895
- Melitaea nevadensis Oberthür, 1904
- Melitaea parthenoides Keferstein, 1851 – European meadow fritillary, meadow fritillary
- Melitaea plotina Bremer, 1861
- Melitaea rebeli Wnukowsky, 1929
- Melitaea varia (Meyer-Dür, 1851) – Grisons fritillary
- Melitaea westsibirica (Dubatolov, 1998)

Incertae sedis

- Melitaea kunlunensis Kudrna & Mracek, 1994
- Melitaea oorschoti Eckweiler, 2008
- Melitaea paludani Clench & Shoumatoff, 1956
- Melitaea tangigharuensis de Freina, 1980
- Melitaea wiltshirei Higgins, 1941
