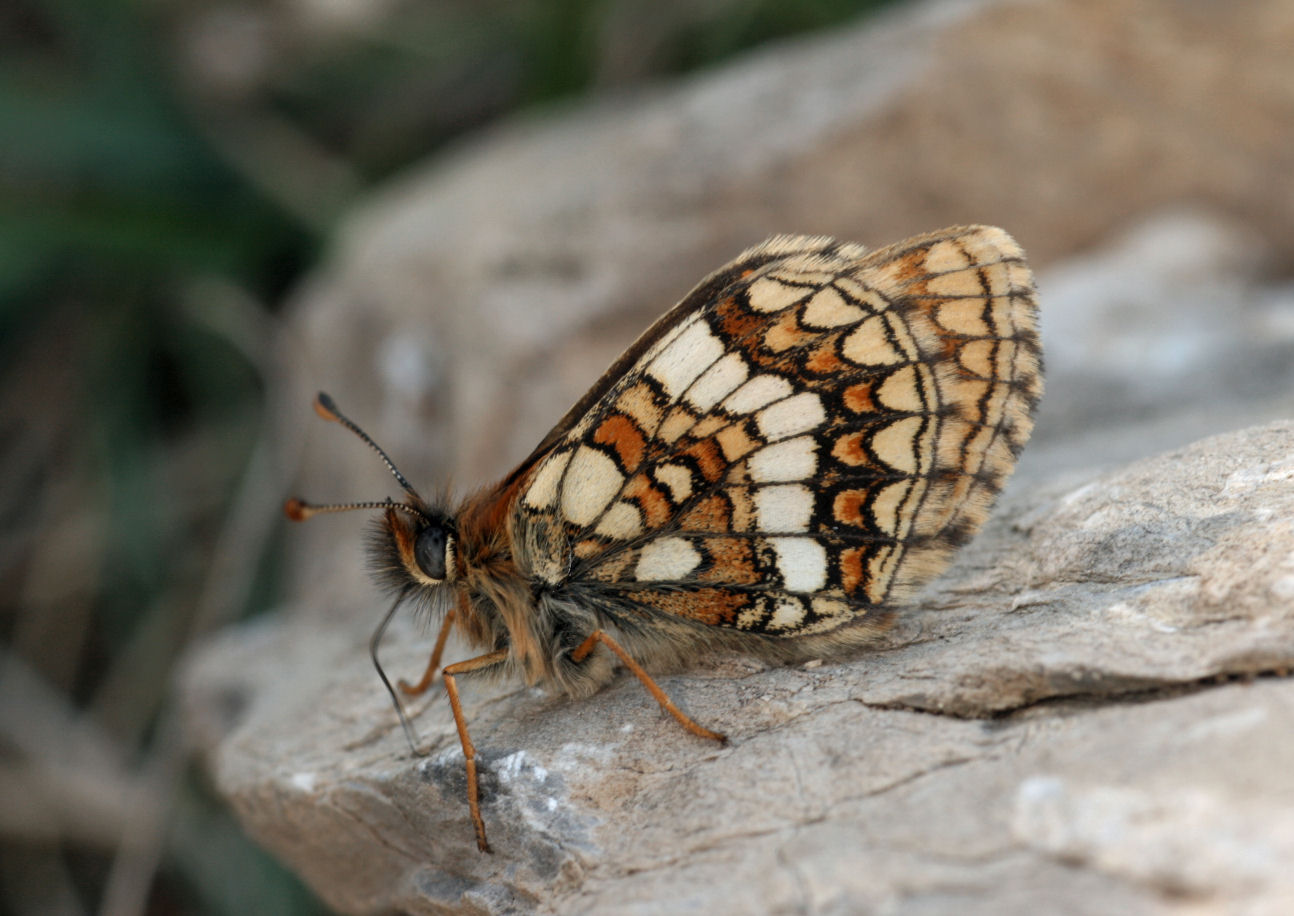

Scientific classification
- Kingdom: Animalia
- Phylum: Arthropoda
- Class: Insecta
- Order: Lepidoptera
- Family: Nymphalidae
- Genus: Melitaea
- Species: M. varia

Binomial name
- Melitaea varia (Meyer-Dür, 1851)

= Melitaea varia =

Species of butterfly

Melitaea varia, the Grisons fritillary, is a butterfly of the family Nymphalidae. It is found in the Alps at heights of 1,500–2,600 m (4,900–8,500 ft), especially in the Swiss cantons Valais, Engadin and Graubünden. It is also found in the Ortler region in South Tyrol, Alpes-Maritimes and Drôme in France, high areas of Tirol in Austria and high areas in the Apennine Mountains such as Abruzzo.

== Description ==
The wingspan is 24–28 mm.

== Description from Seitz ==
varia Meyer-Dür (65b) is a smaller form from the higher Alps, recognizable by the markings on the hindwing beneath, which are pale yellow in the nymotypical form, being silvery white. In the male the markings in the median area of the forewing are usually somewhat obsolescent, the network formed by the veins and transverse lines being interrupted or paler before the apex. The female often shaded with blackish, the ground-colour having a tint of brass-colour or olive; the abdomen very heavy.

== Similar species ==
- Melitaea parthenoides. This species is larger, with a more distinct trellis pattern, and has fox-red palpi that are usually dark brown in varia . In addition, it flies in low-lying regions, so that there is hardly any overlapping of the flight area.
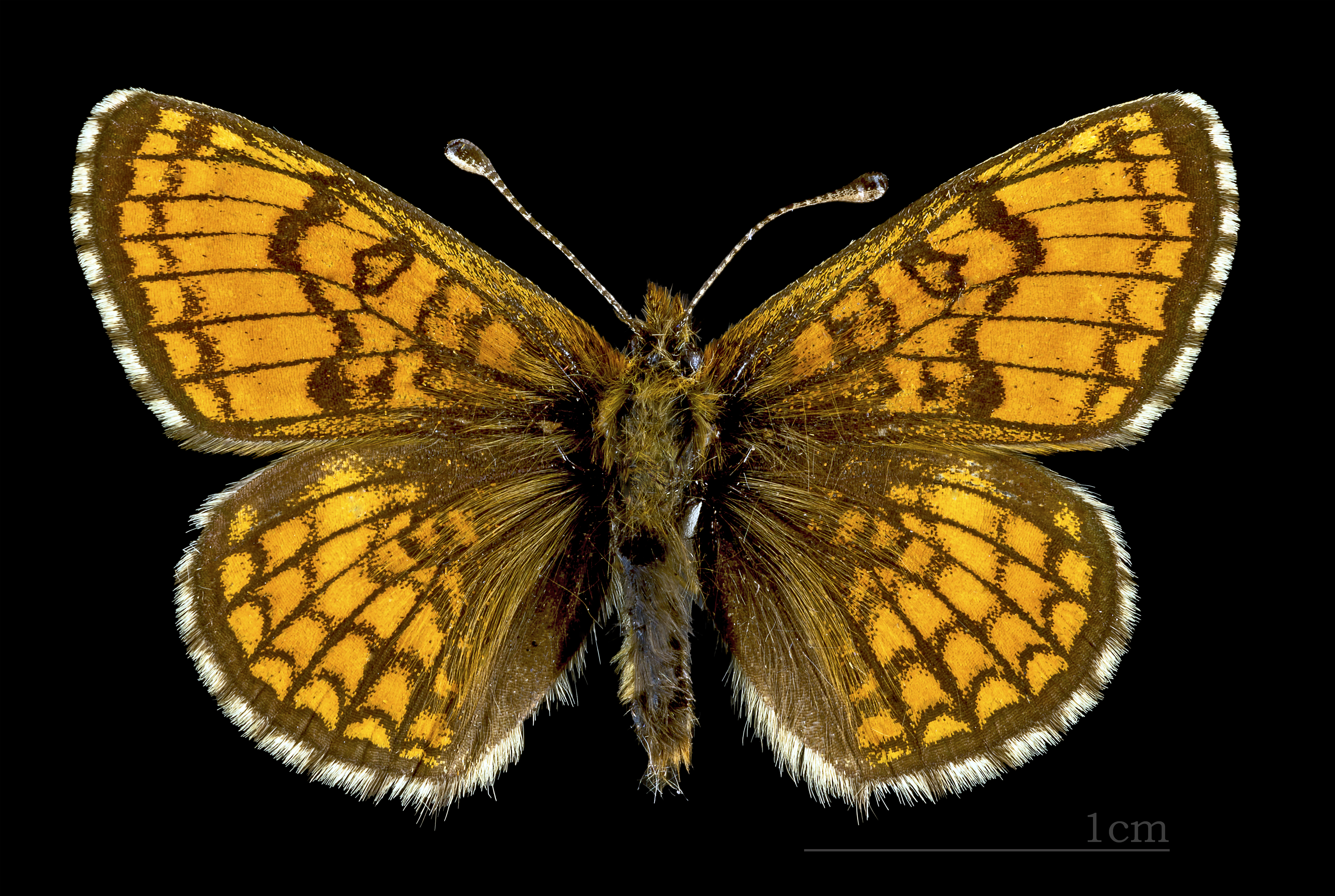
Male

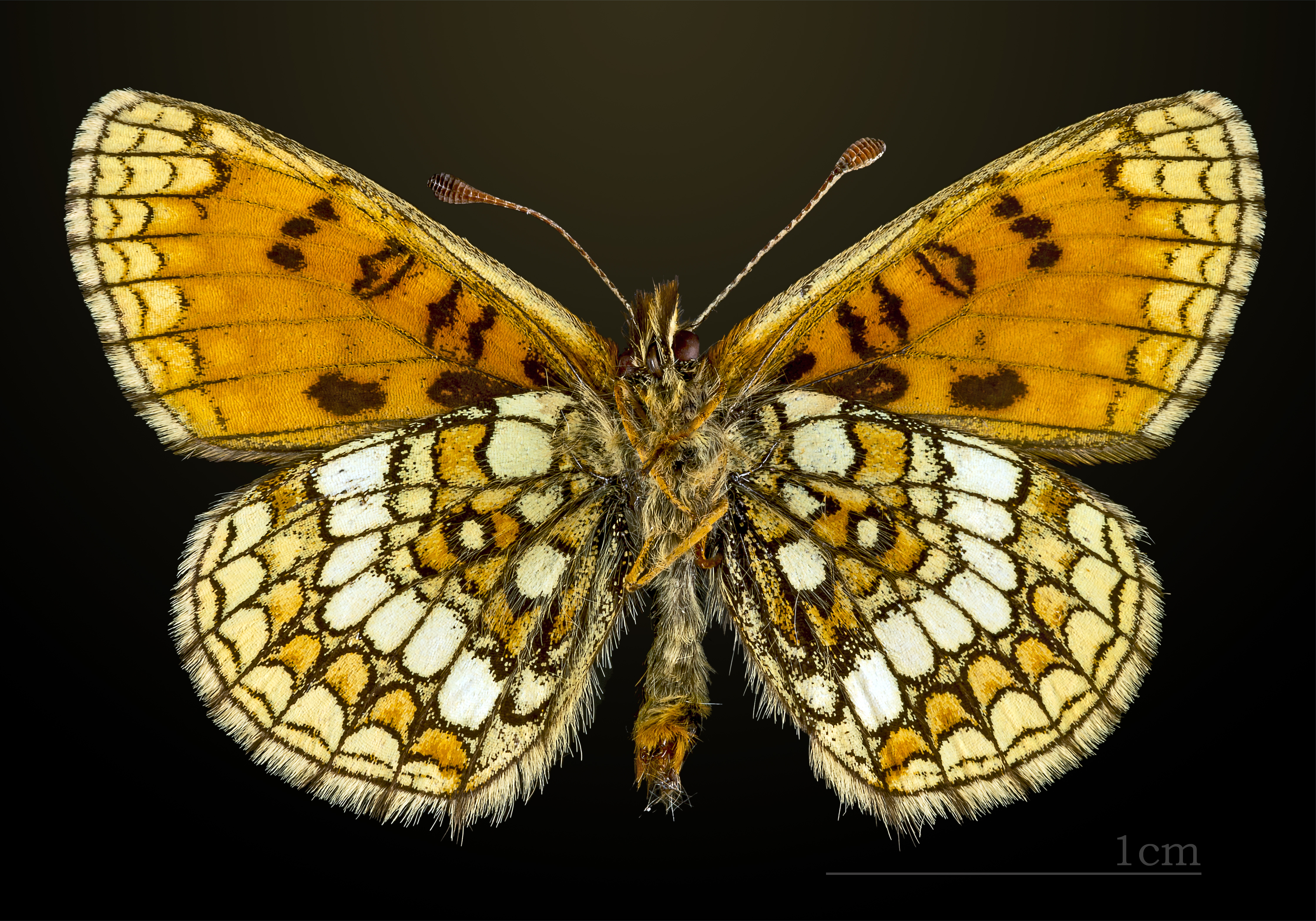
Male underside

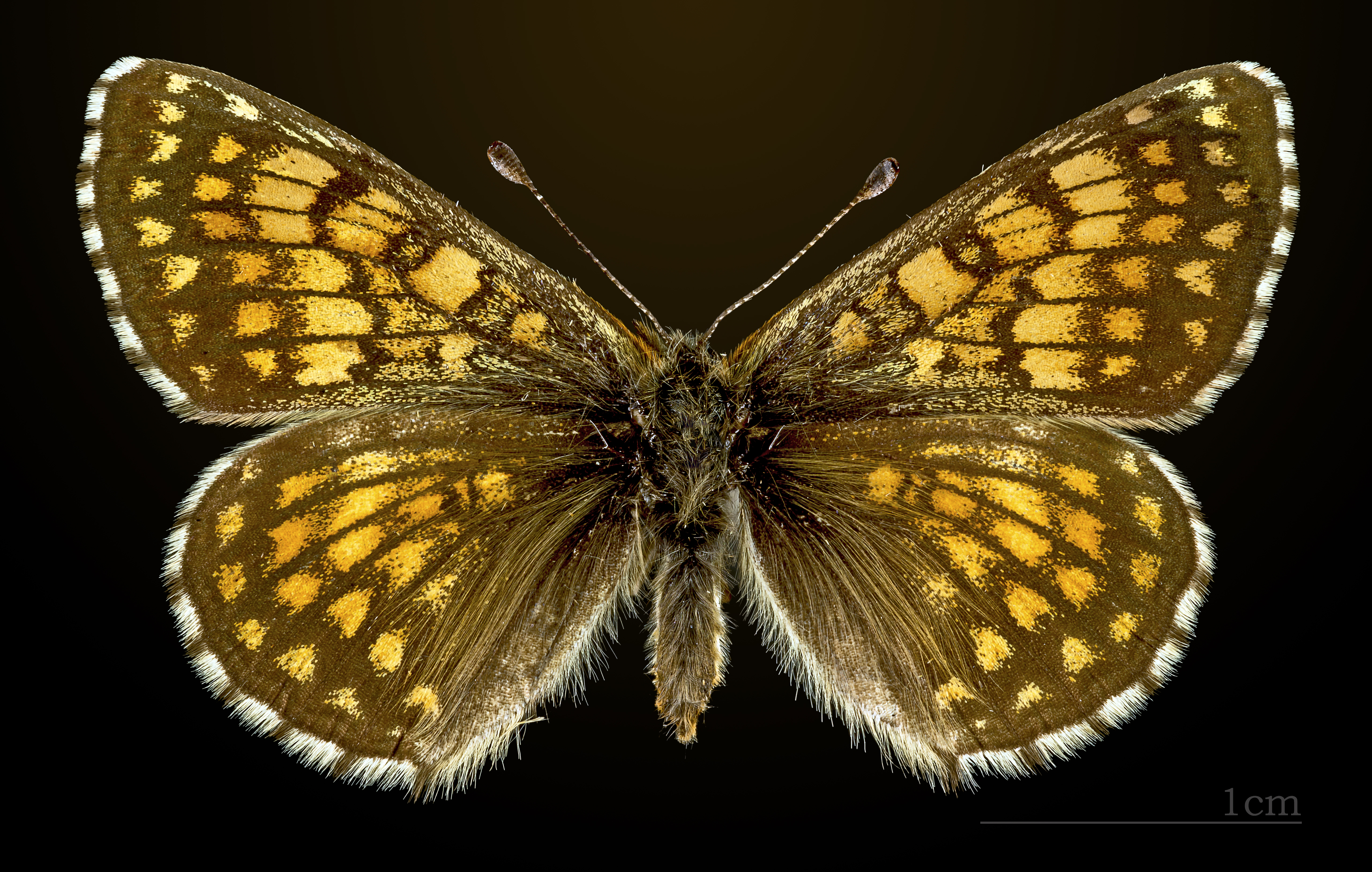
Female

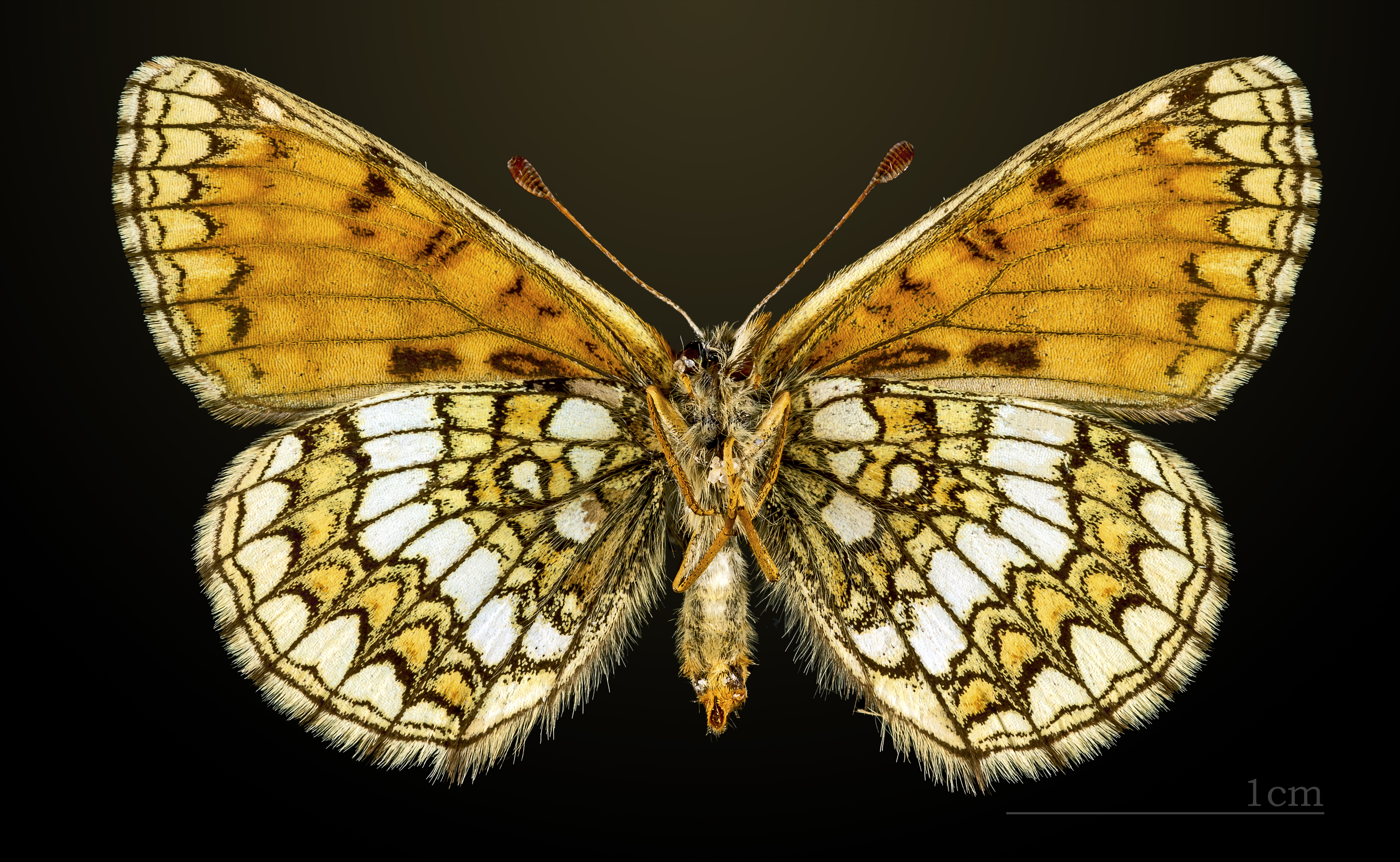
Female underside

== Biology ==
There is one generation per year. The butterfly flies from June to August depending on the location. The larvae feed on various low-growing plants, including Plantago alpina, Gentiana verna and Gentiana acaulis.
