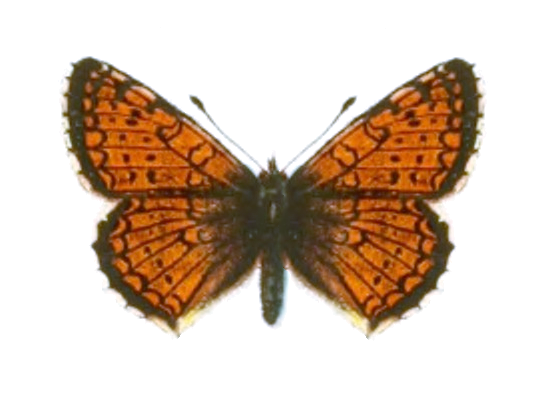
- Melitaea arcesia chuana
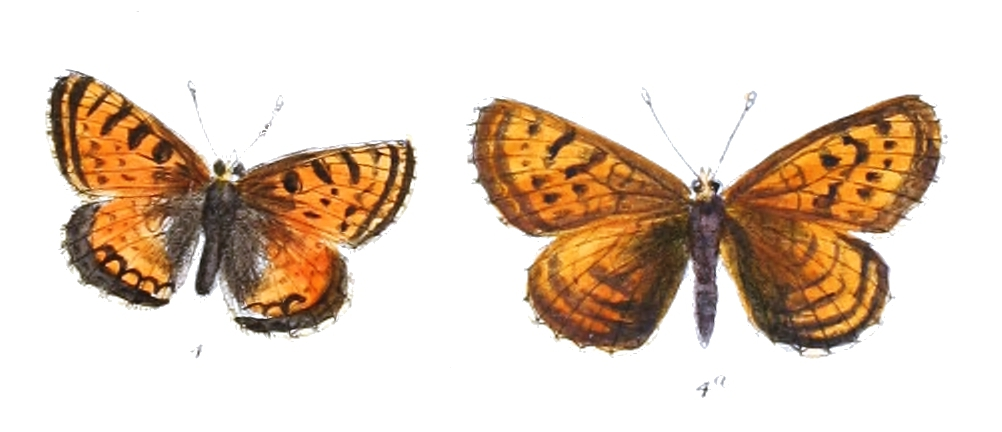
- Melitaea arcesia sikkimensis

Scientific classification
- Domain: Eukaryota
- Kingdom: Animalia
- Phylum: Arthropoda
- Class: Insecta
- Order: Lepidoptera
- Family: Nymphalidae
- Genus: Melitaea
- Species: M. arcesia

Binomial name
- Melitaea arcesia Bremer, 1861

Synonyms
- Melitaea arcesia leechi Alphéraky, 1895; Melitaea arcesia irma Higgins, 1941; Melitaea baicalensis var. chuana Grum-Grshimailo, 1893; Melitaea carmana Fruhstorfer, 1915; Melitaea dabanica Baranchikov, 1979

= Melitaea arcesia =

Blackvein fritillary

Species of butterfly

Melitaea arcesia, the blackvein fritillary, is a butterfly of the family Nymphalidae. It is found from southern Siberia and Transbaikalia to the Amur region, Mongolia and China. The habitat consists of steppe-clad slopes.

Adults are on wing from June to August.

== Subspecies ==
- Melitaea arcesia arcesia (Transbaikalia)
- Melitaea arcesia minor Elwes, 1899 (Altai)
- Melitaea arcesia chuana Grum-Grshimailo, 1893
- Melitaea arcesia sikkimensis Moore, 1901 (India)
- Melitaea arcesia carmana Fruhstorfer, 1915 (Sayan)
- Melitaea arcesia rucephala Fruhstorfer, 1915 (Tian Shan Mountains)
