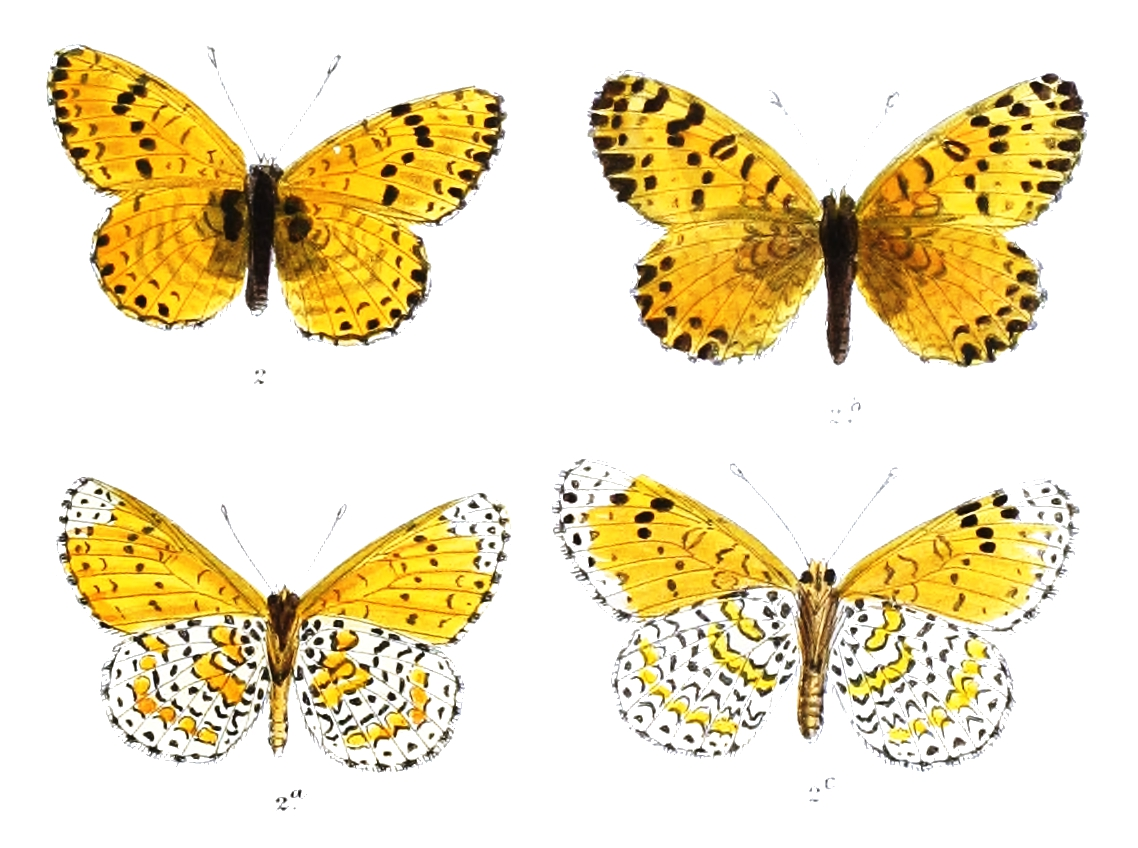

Scientific classification
- Kingdom: Animalia
- Phylum: Arthropoda
- Class: Insecta
- Order: Lepidoptera
- Family: Nymphalidae
- Genus: Melitaea
- Species: M. robertsi

Binomial name
- Melitaea robertsi Butler, 1880

= Melitaea robertsi =

Species of butterfly

The Baluchi fritillary (Melitaea robertsi) is a butterfly of the Nymphalidae. It is found in Baluchistan and Chitral.
