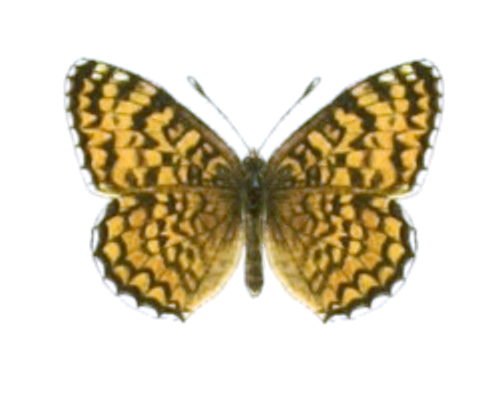

Scientific classification
- Domain: Eukaryota
- Kingdom: Animalia
- Phylum: Arthropoda
- Class: Insecta
- Order: Lepidoptera
- Family: Nymphalidae
- Genus: Melitaea
- Species: M. punica

Binomial name
- Melitaea punica Oberthür, 1876

Synonyms
- Melitaea phoebe var. punica Oberthür, 1876; Melitaea phoebe amanica Rebel, 1917

= Melitaea punica =

Species of butterfly

Melitaea punica is a butterfly of the family Nymphalidae. It is found in North Africa.

Adults are on wing from June to July.
