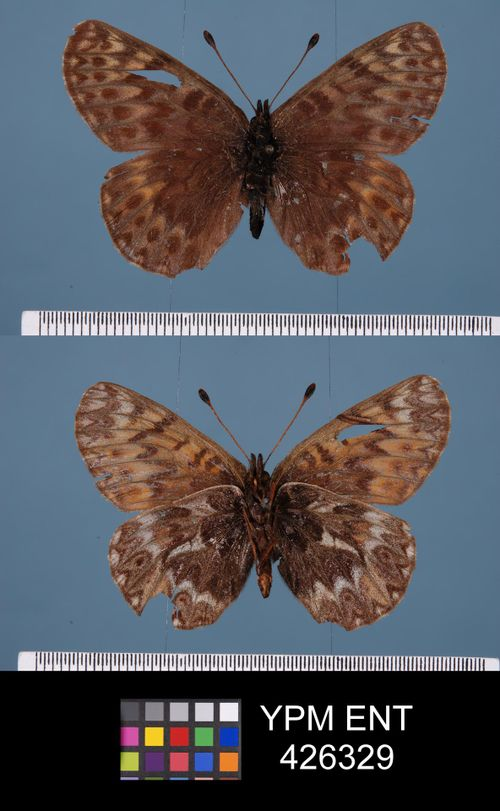

Conservation status
- Vulnerable (NatureServe)

Scientific classification
- Kingdom: Animalia
- Phylum: Arthropoda
- Class: Insecta
- Order: Lepidoptera
- Family: Nymphalidae
- Genus: Boloria
- Species: B. natazhati

Binomial name
- Boloria natazhati (Gibson, 1920)

Synonyms
- Clossiana natazhati; Brenthis natazhati Gibson, 1920; Boloria freija nabokovi Stallings & Turner, 1947

= Boloria natazhati =

Species of butterfly

Boloria natazhati, the Beringian fritillary, cryptic fritillary or Pleistocene fritillary, is a butterfly of the family Nymphalidae. It is found from northwestern Canada as far south as northern British Columbia.

The wingspan is 32–44 mm. The butterfly flies from mid-June to July. It is found in a variety of habitats including screes, slopes, rocky ridges, and cobble beaches.

The larvae possibly feed on Dryas integrifolia. Adults feed on flower nectar from Phlox sibirica and saxifraga species.
