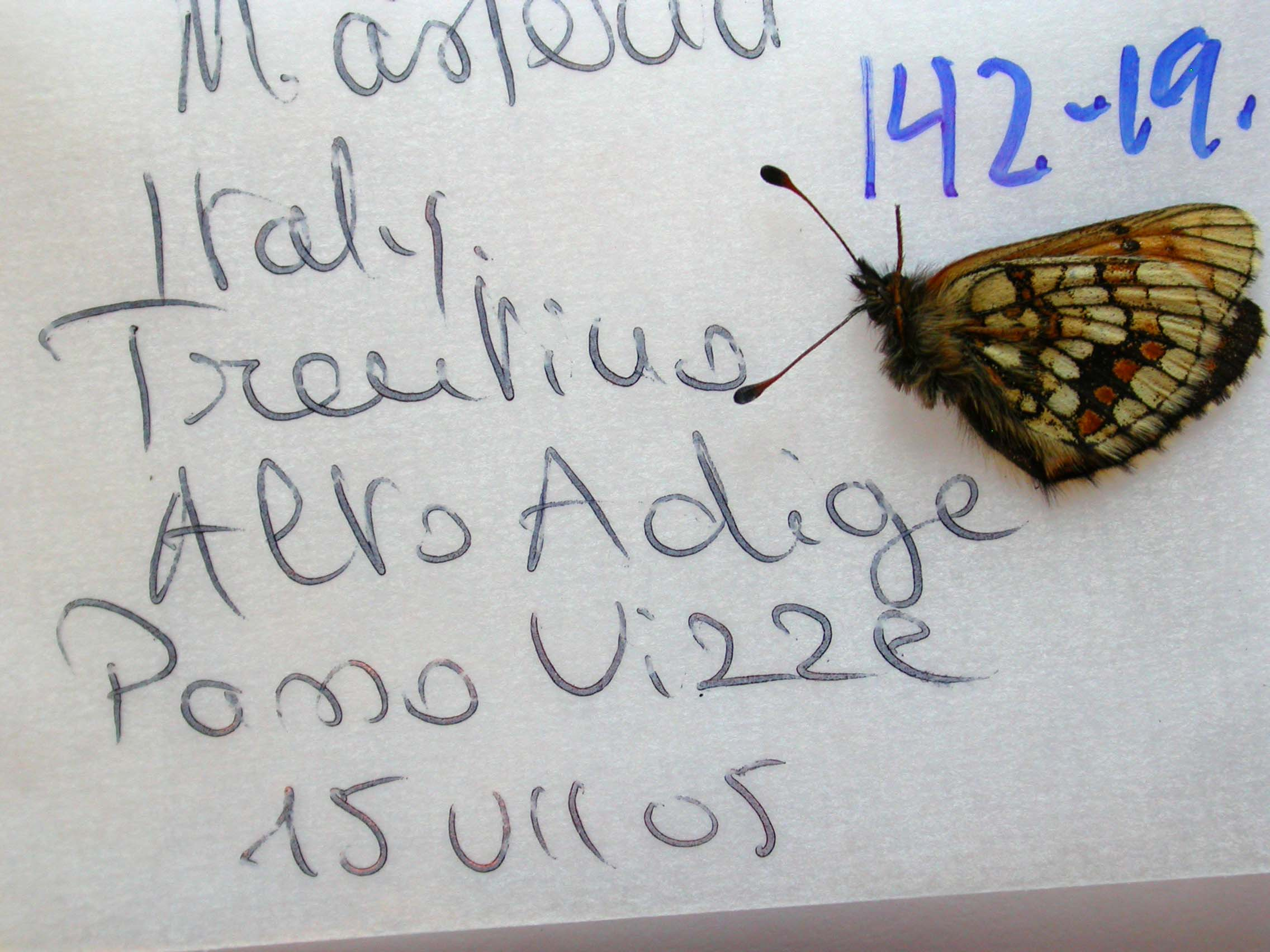

Scientific classification
- Kingdom: Animalia
- Phylum: Arthropoda
- Class: Insecta
- Order: Lepidoptera
- Family: Nymphalidae
- Genus: Melitaea
- Species: M. asteria

Binomial name
- Melitaea asteria (Freyer, 1828)

= Melitaea asteria =

Little fritillary

Species of butterfly

Melitaea asteria, the little fritillary, is a butterfly in the family Nymphalidae. It is found in the Alps of Europe.

The larva feeds on Plantago alpina.
