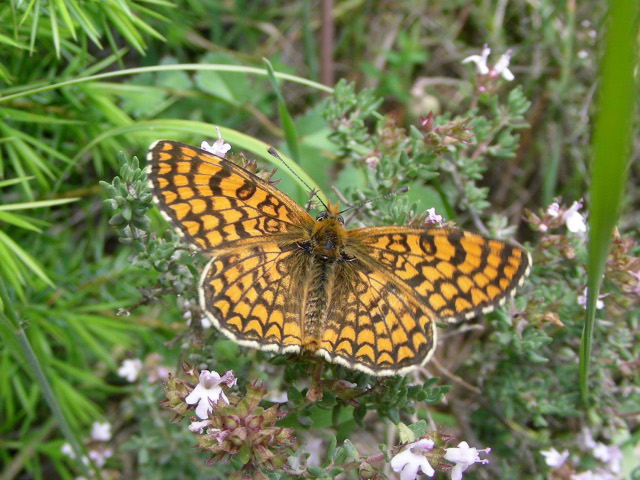

Scientific classification
- Kingdom: Animalia
- Phylum: Arthropoda
- Class: Insecta
- Order: Lepidoptera
- Family: Nymphalidae
- Genus: Melitaea
- Species: M. deione

Binomial name
- Melitaea deione Geyer, 1832

Synonyms
- Mellicta deione

= Provençal fritillary =

Species of butterfly

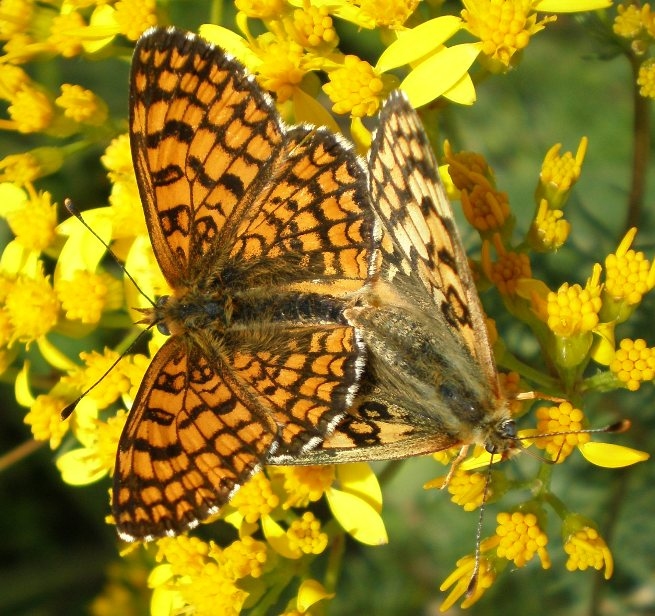
Mating

The Provençal fritillary (Melitaea deione) is a butterfly in the family Nymphalidae. It is found in south-western Europe and North Africa. The range extends from the Iberian Peninsula to southern France and the Alps in Switzerland and Italy. It is also found in the Atlas Mountains.

== Description ==
In spite of its great similarity to athalia, this South-West European form is considered specifically distinct, particularly, it seems, because the wings are more elongate and there occur in South France and Spain also forms of athalia with which dejone is not identical. In markings more resembling athalia, in colour more parthenie. In the female the reddish yellow median band of the upperside is somewhat paler, so that there are two contrasting tints of reddish yellow. The underside nearly as in parthenie, the light bands of the hindwing as in parthenie not silvery and not divided by a black line. The individuals even from the same place differ so much that one might be inclined to place some with parthenie and others with athalia. Perhaps the insect will in future be proved to be a local or seasonal form of one of the allied species.

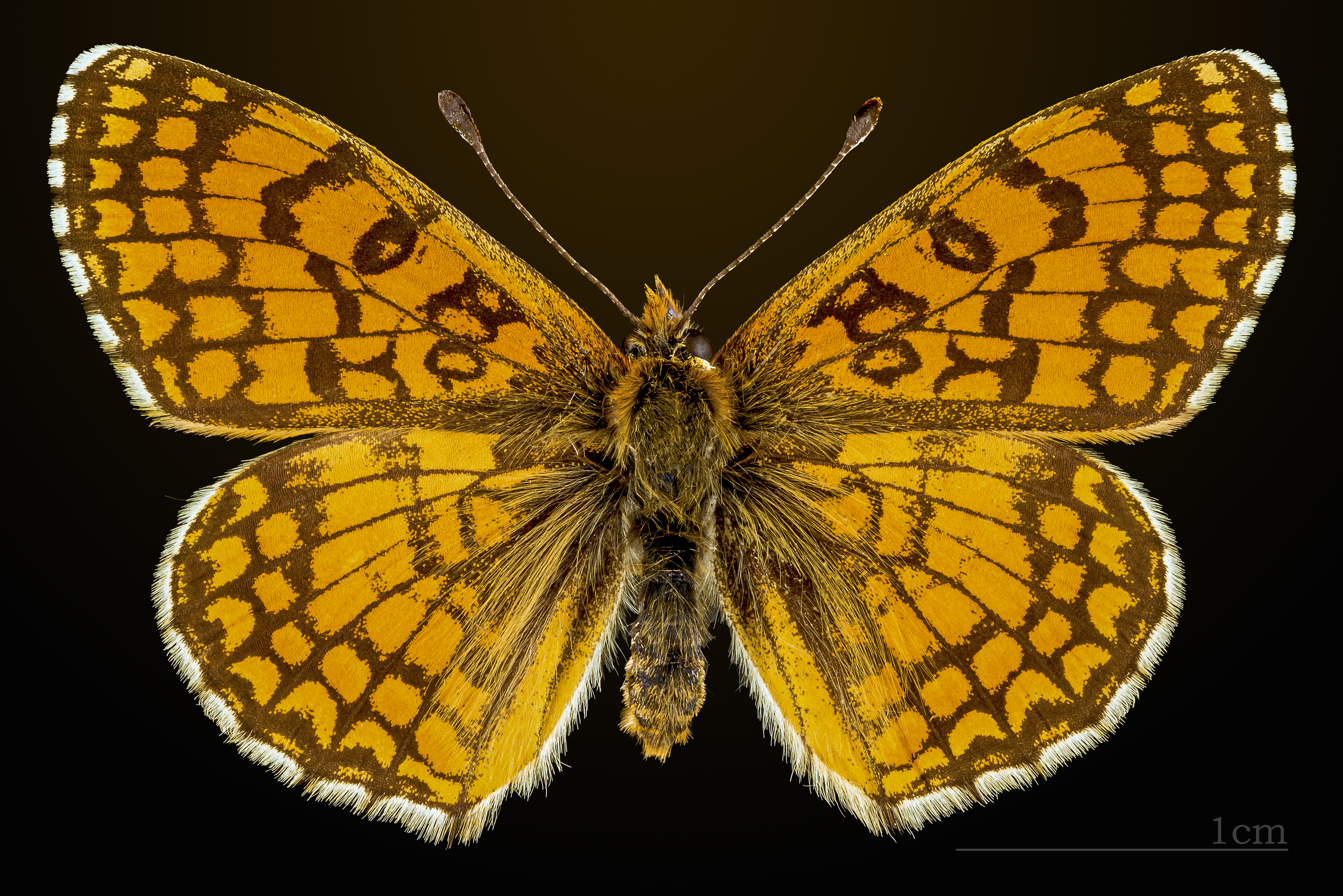
Male dorsal – MHNT

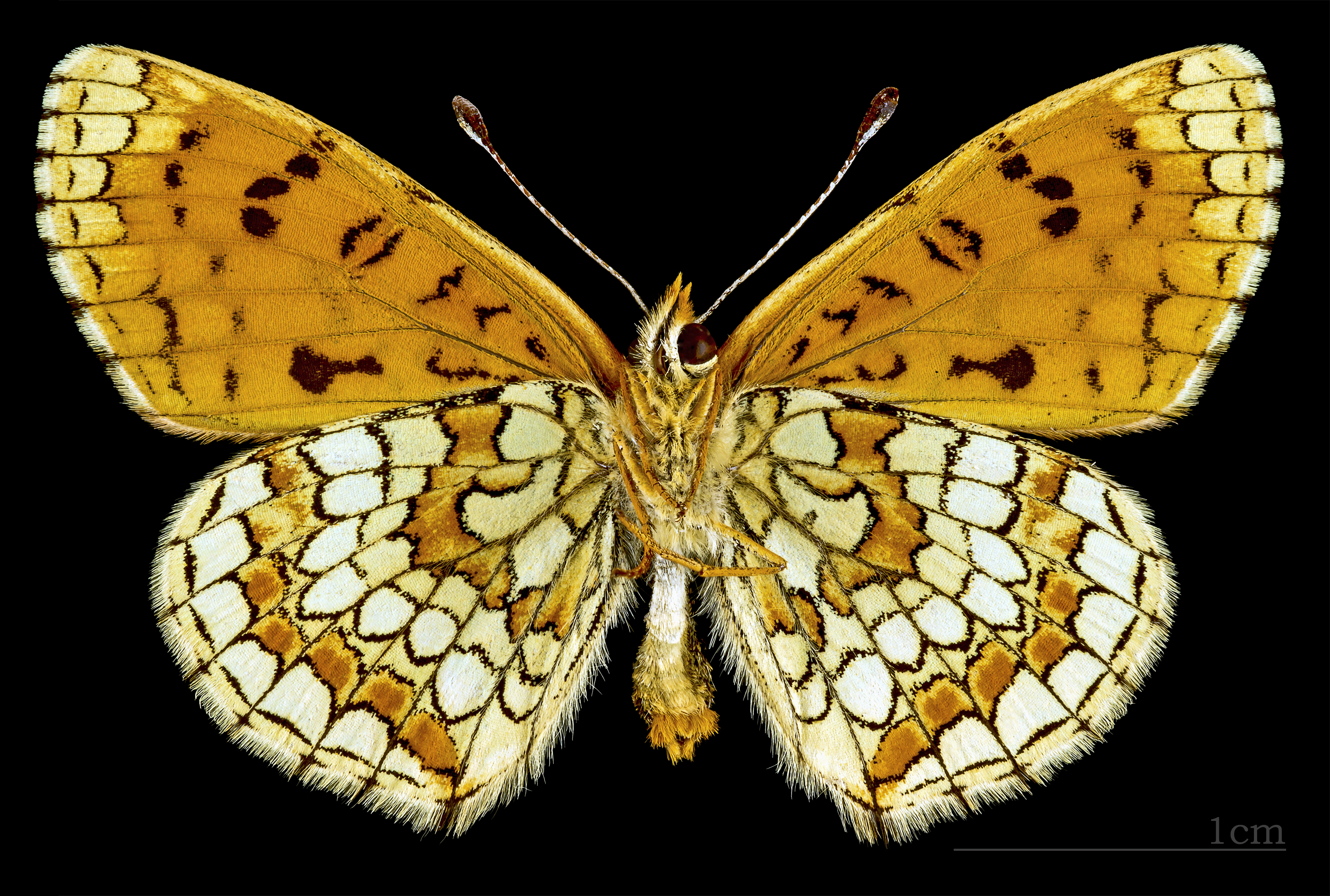
Male ventral - MHNT

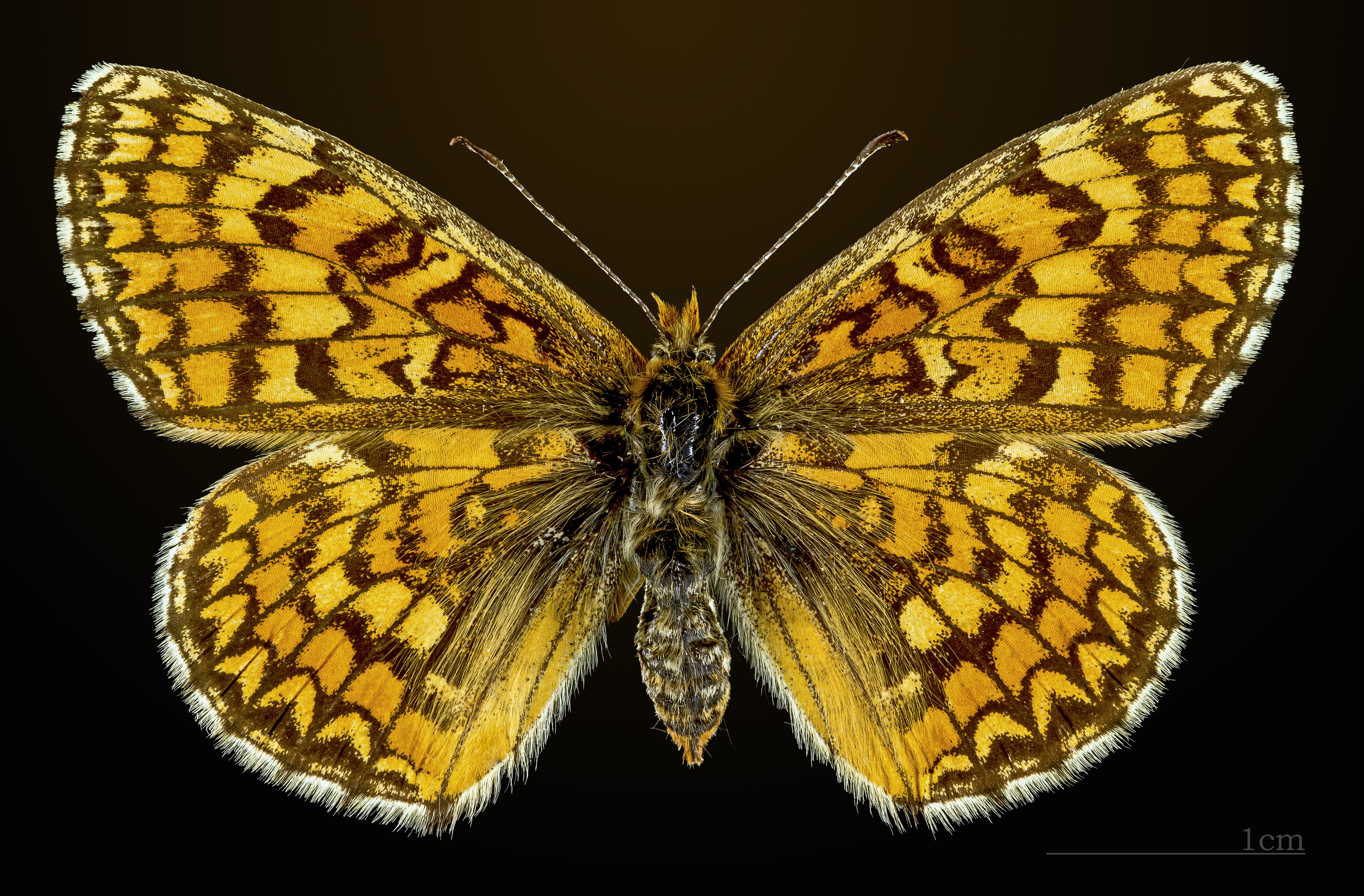
Female dorsal - MHNT

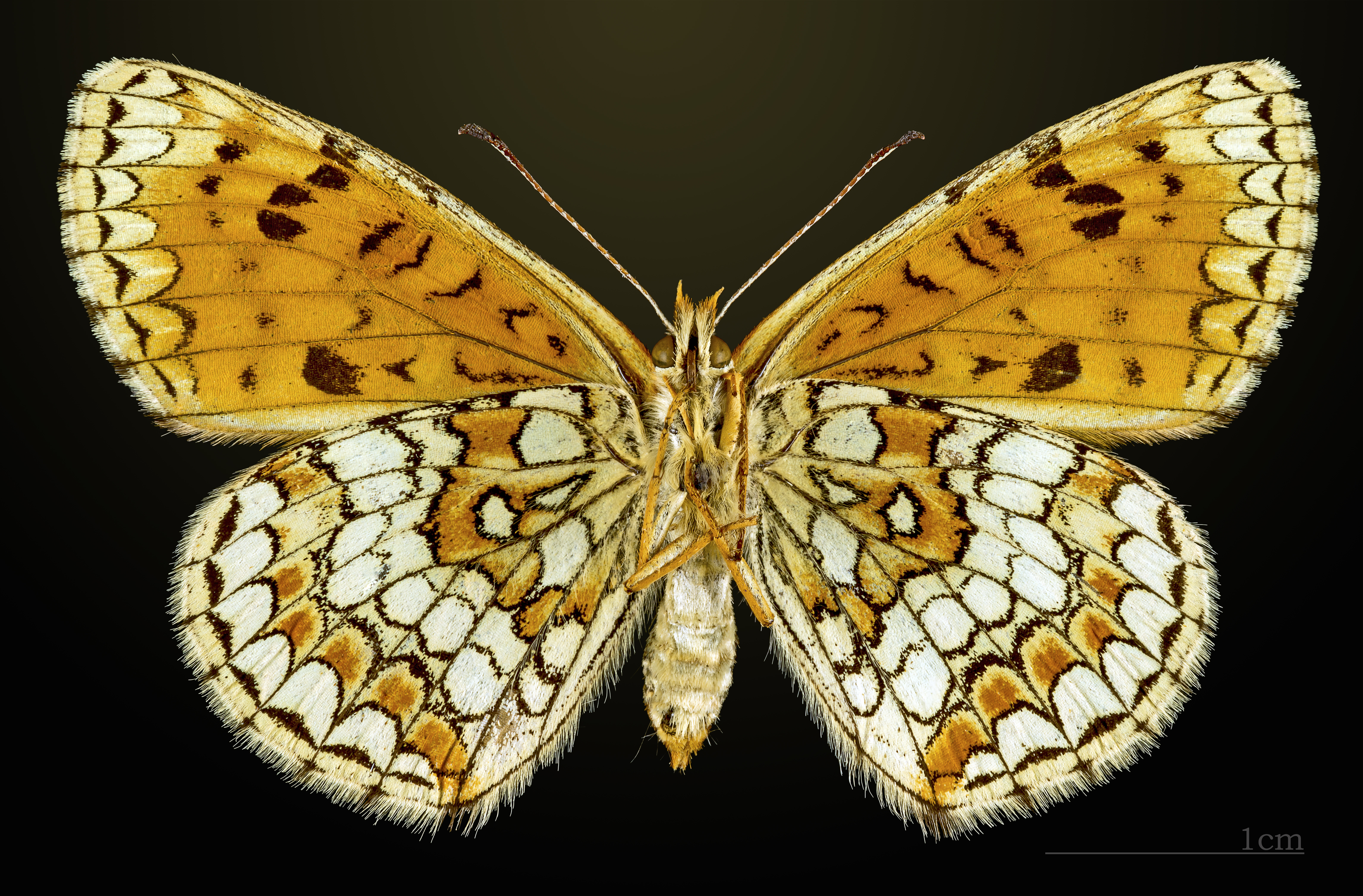
Female ventral - MHNT

== Biology ==
There are two generations per year with adults on wing from April to September. In the Alps, there is one generation.

The larva feeds on species of Linaria, Chaenorrhinum, Digitalis and Antirrhinum (including Antirrhinum sempervirens).

== Subspecies ==
There are three subspecies:

- M. d. deione
- M. d. berisalii (Rühl, 1891)
- M. d. nitida (Oberthür, 1909) (west Morocco (Rif mountains), western Algeria (Tlemcen, Sebdou))

== Etymology ==
In Greek mythology Deione, is the name given to Demeter's daughter, Persephone.
