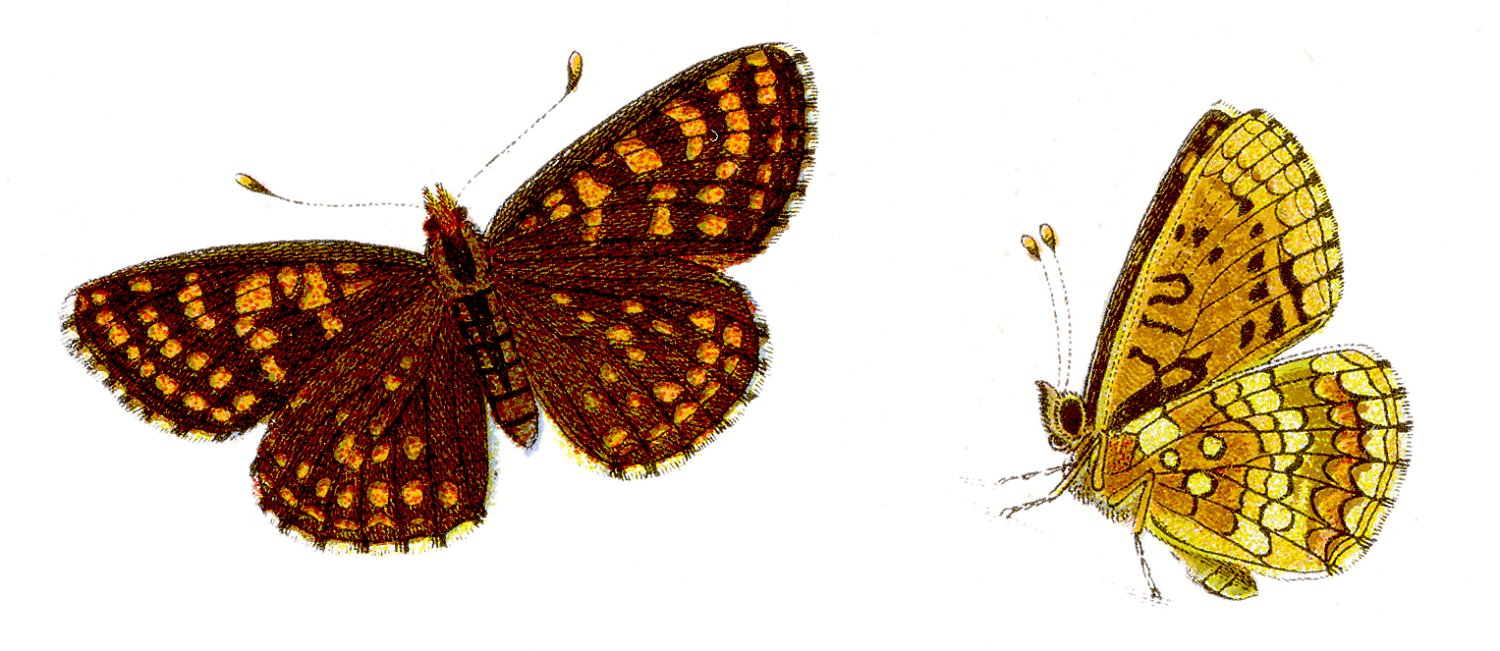

Scientific classification
- Domain: Eukaryota
- Kingdom: Animalia
- Phylum: Arthropoda
- Class: Insecta
- Order: Lepidoptera
- Family: Nymphalidae
- Genus: Mellicta
- Species: M. aurelia

Binomial name
- Mellicta aurelia (Nickerl, 1850)

Synonyms
- Melitaea aurelia Nickerl, 1850; Melitaea dorfmeisteri Verity, 1950; Melitaea fuscissima Verity, 1950; Melitaea commacula Caruel, 1944; Melitaea ligata Caruel, 1944; Melitaea nigropunctata Caruel, 1944; Melitaea unifasciata Caruel, 1944; Melitaea subnigrescens Cleu, 1932; Melitaea cinerea Mellaerts, 1929; Melitaea pyronioides Reuss, 1921; Melitaea faivrei Le Charles, 1920; Melitaea lucasi Verity, 1920; Melitaea chappuisi Heinrich, 1917; Melitaea corythalina Rebel, 1913; Melitaea charlotta Rebel, 1912; Melitaea melanodes Lambillion, 1910; Melitaea serotina Oberthür, 1909; Melitaea corythalia Spuler, 1901; Melitaea latonigena Spuler, 1901; Melitaea navarina Spuler, 1901; Melitaea parthenie Borkhausen, 1788; Melitaea minor Esper, 1784

= Mellicta aurelia =

Species of butterfly

Mellicta aurelia, or Nickerl's fritillary, is a butterfly of the family Nymphalidae. It is found in central Europe.

== Description ==
The wingspan is 28–32 mm (1.1–1.3 in). Dark russet-brown, so strongly marked with black that the ground-colour is reduced in the female to very small spots. On the whole similar to Melitaea athalia, but smaller, with the black markings deeper in tint and heavier, the ground-colour darker, more brownish; beneath the marginal line before the fringes is absent or but very indistinct. The species is recognizable by the palpi bearing foxy red hairs, while the palpi of athalia are whitish, being occasionally somewhat reddish yellow and then only at the base.

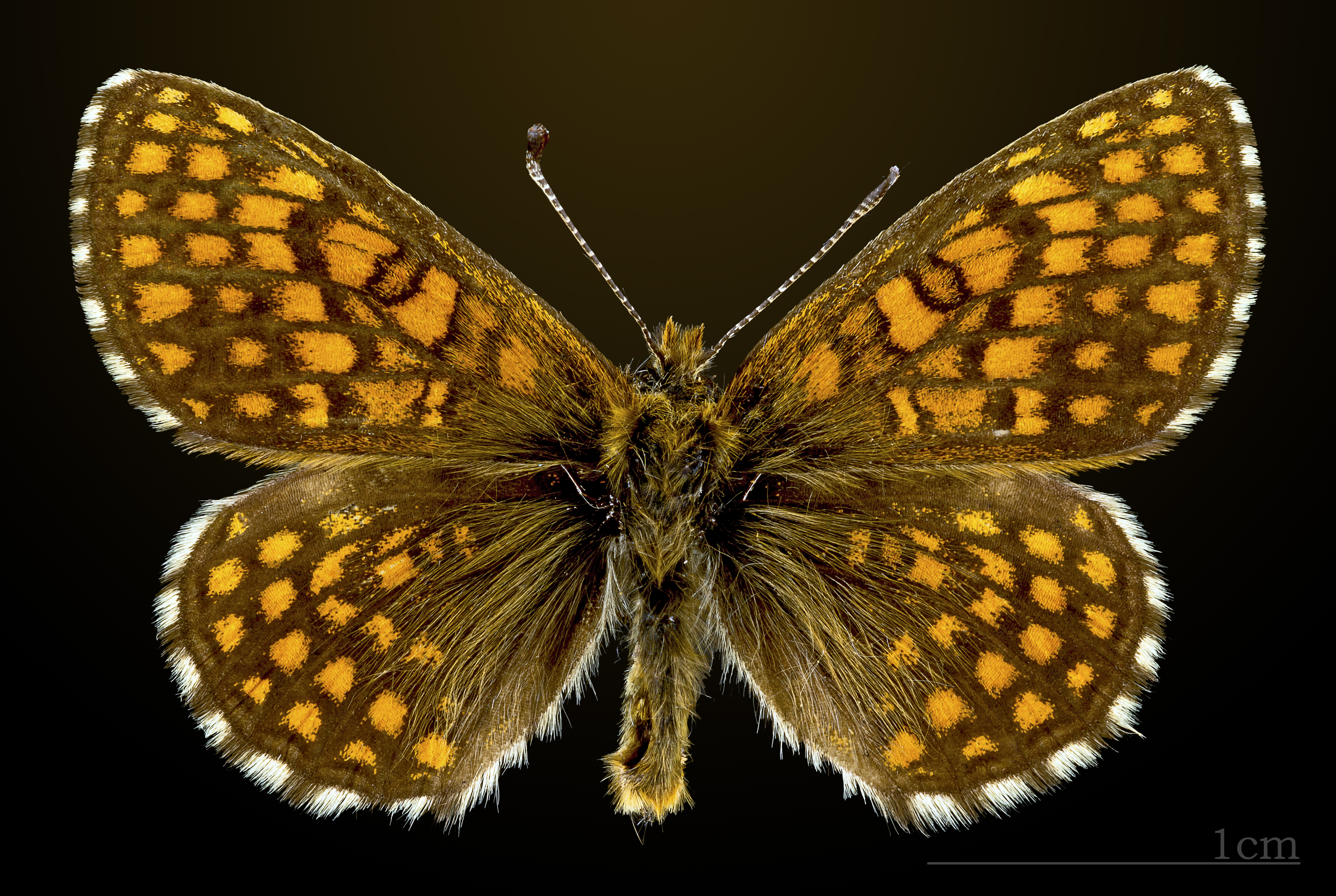
Male

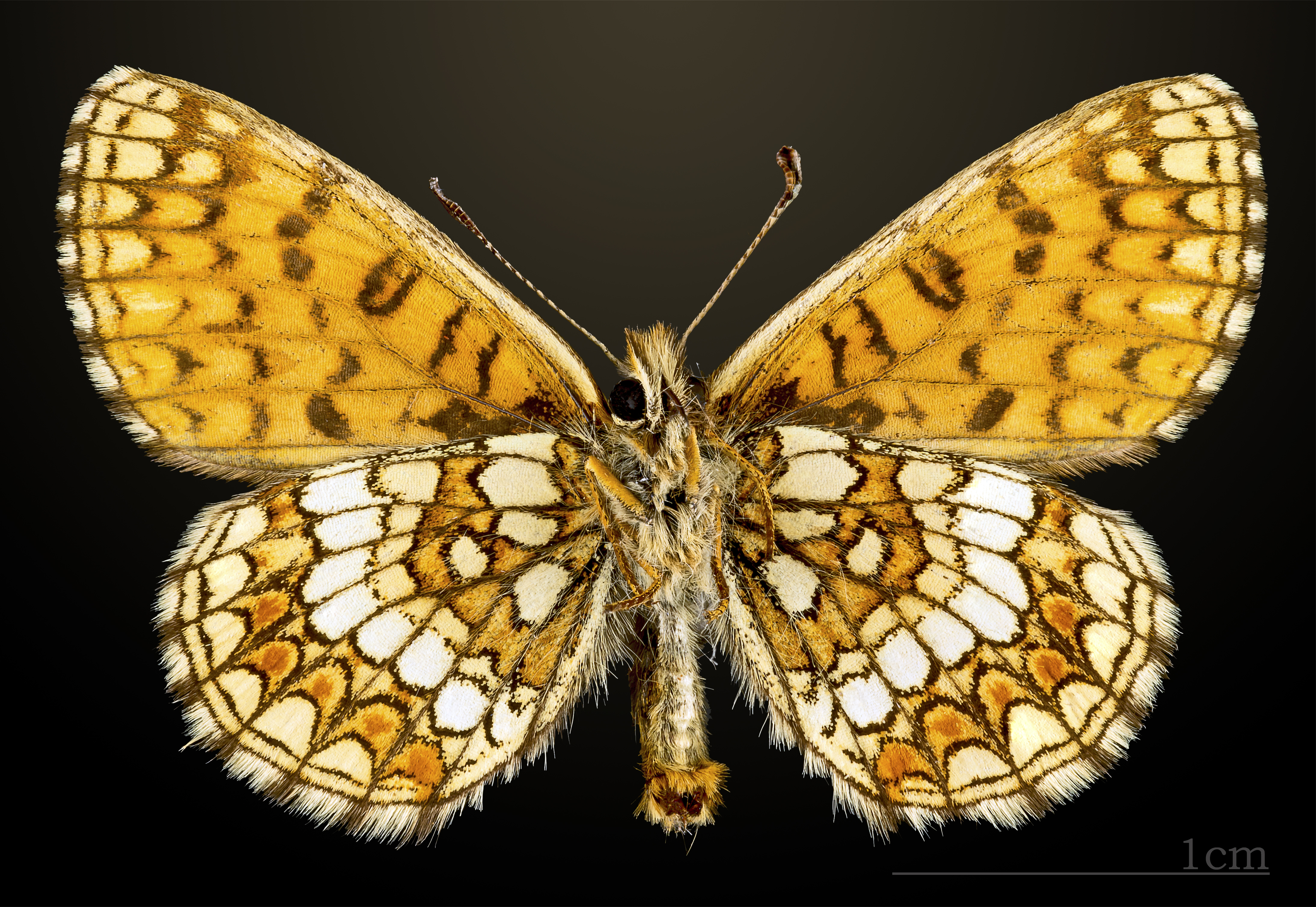
Male underside

== Biology ==
The butterfly flies from June to August depending on the location. The larvae feed on Plantago lanceolata, Melampyrum pratense and yellow rattle.
