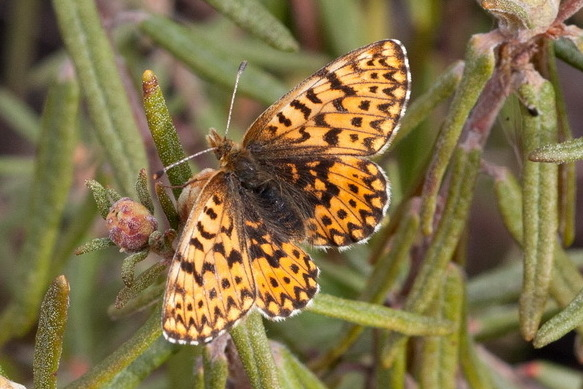
- In central Russia

Scientific classification
- Domain: Eukaryota
- Kingdom: Animalia
- Phylum: Arthropoda
- Class: Insecta
- Order: Lepidoptera
- Family: Nymphalidae
- Genus: Boloria
- Species: B. freija

Binomial name
- Boloria freija (Becklin in Thunberg, 1791)

Synonyms
- Clossiana freija

= Boloria freija =

Freija fritillary

Species of butterfly

Boloria freija, the Freija fritillary, is a butterfly of the family Nymphalidae with a circumboreal distribution. It occurs in bogs and tundra. Its range includes Northern Europe to the north of 60° N, occasionally more southern locations, the Urals, Siberia, the Russian Far East, mountains of northern Mongolia and Hokkaido, as well as North America, extending in the Rocky Mountains to 35° N.

== Description ==
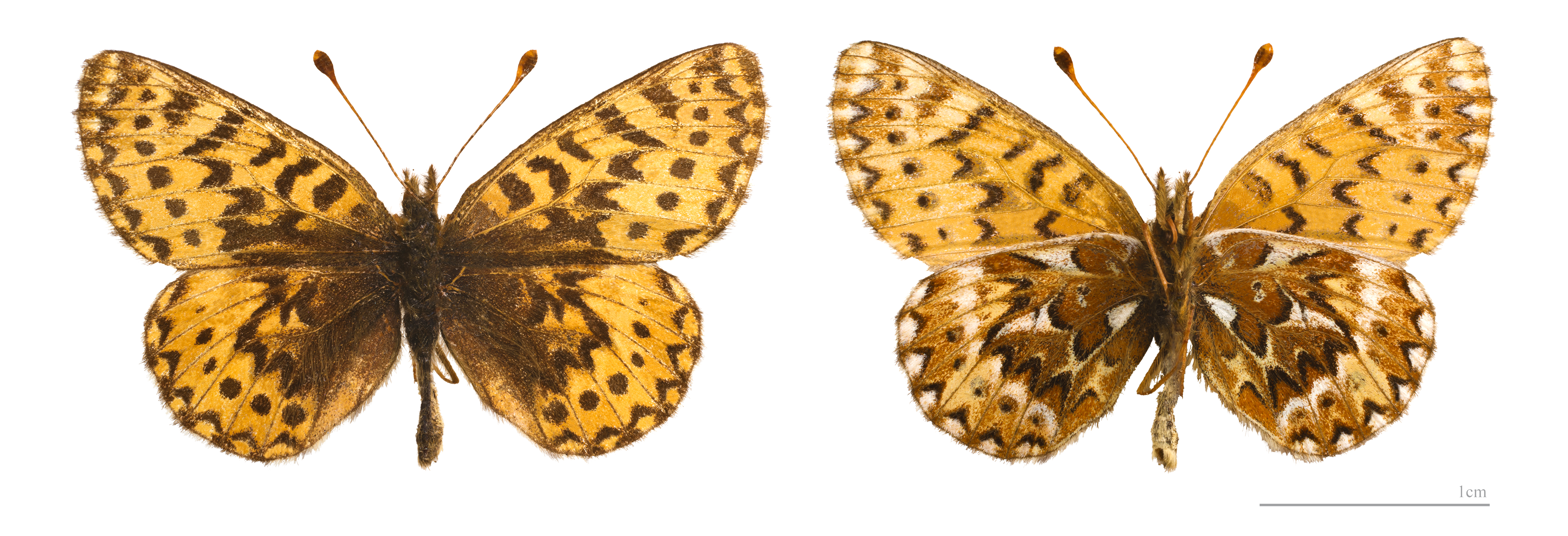
specimen from Montana

A. freija Thnbg. (— lapponica Esp., tullia O., freya Godt.) (68c). Upperside almost exactly as in dia, the size also being the same. The hindwing beneath resembles that of chariclea, but is more variegated, with a distinct silvery white band between the central and marginal areas; a large rhomboidal silver-spot in the centre of the costa and rather long silver-spots at the margin.

== Biology ==
Larvae feed on Rubus chamaemorus, Dryas sp., Vaccinium uliginosum, Arctostaphylos alpina, A. uva-ursi, Empetrum nigrum, Rhododendron aureum, Rh. lapponicum. The species produces one generation every two years.

== Etymology ==
Named after Freya, the goddess of love and war in Norse mythology.
