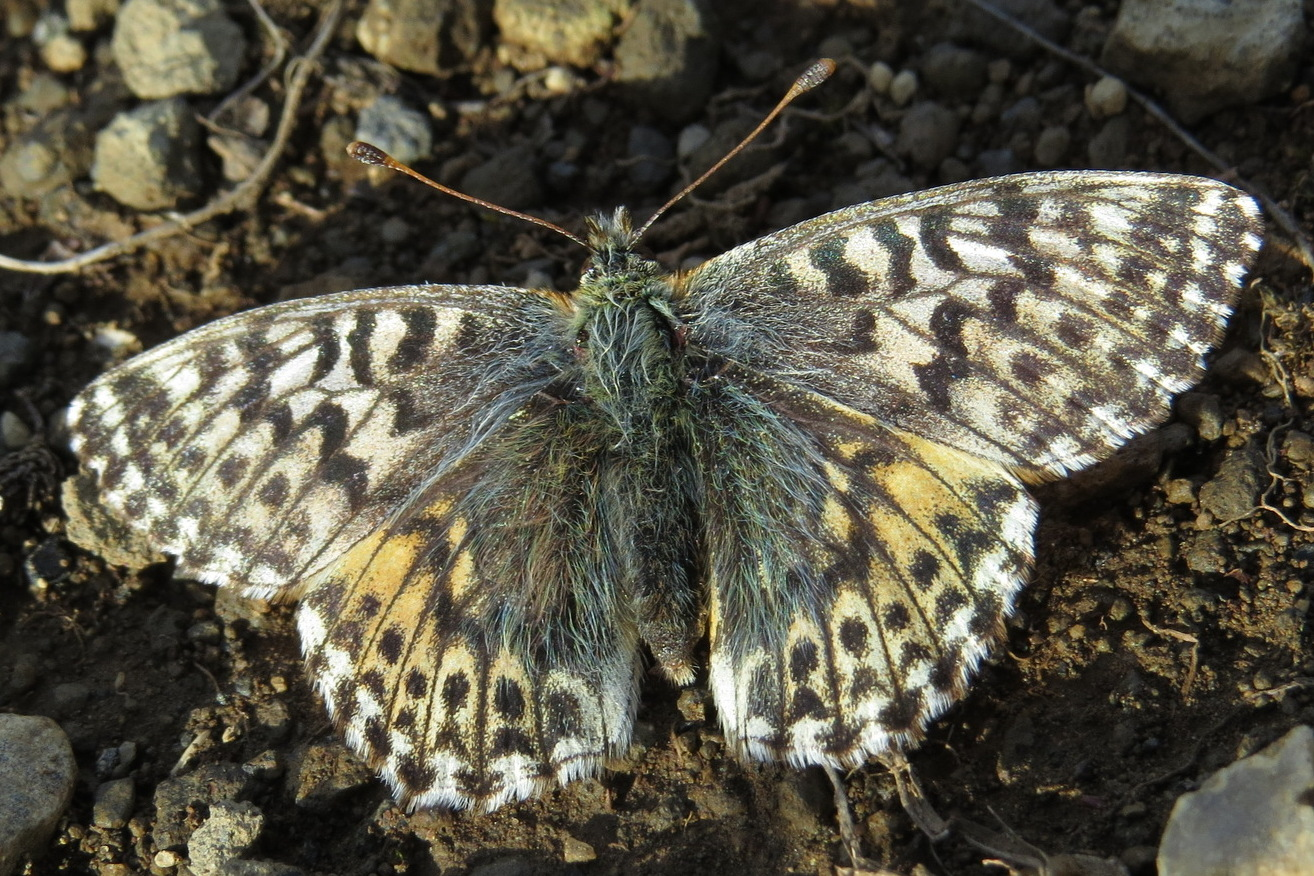

Scientific classification
- Domain: Eukaryota
- Kingdom: Animalia
- Phylum: Arthropoda
- Class: Insecta
- Order: Lepidoptera
- Family: Nymphalidae
- Genus: Boloria
- Species: B. alaskensis

Binomial name
- Boloria alaskensis (W. Holland, 1900)

= Boloria alaskensis =

Species of butterfly

Boloria alaskensis, the mountain fritillary or Alaskan fritillary, is a species of fritillary butterfly in the family Nymphalidae. It was described by William Jacob Holland in 1900 and is found in North America and North European Russia. The MONA or Hodges number for Boloria alaskensis is 4462. The larvae feed on false bistort (Polygonum bistortoides) and alpine smartweed (P. viviparum).

It is very similar to Boloria pales.

== Subspecies ==
- Boloria alaskensis alaskensis (W. Holland, 1900)
- Boloria alaskensis halli Klots, 1940
