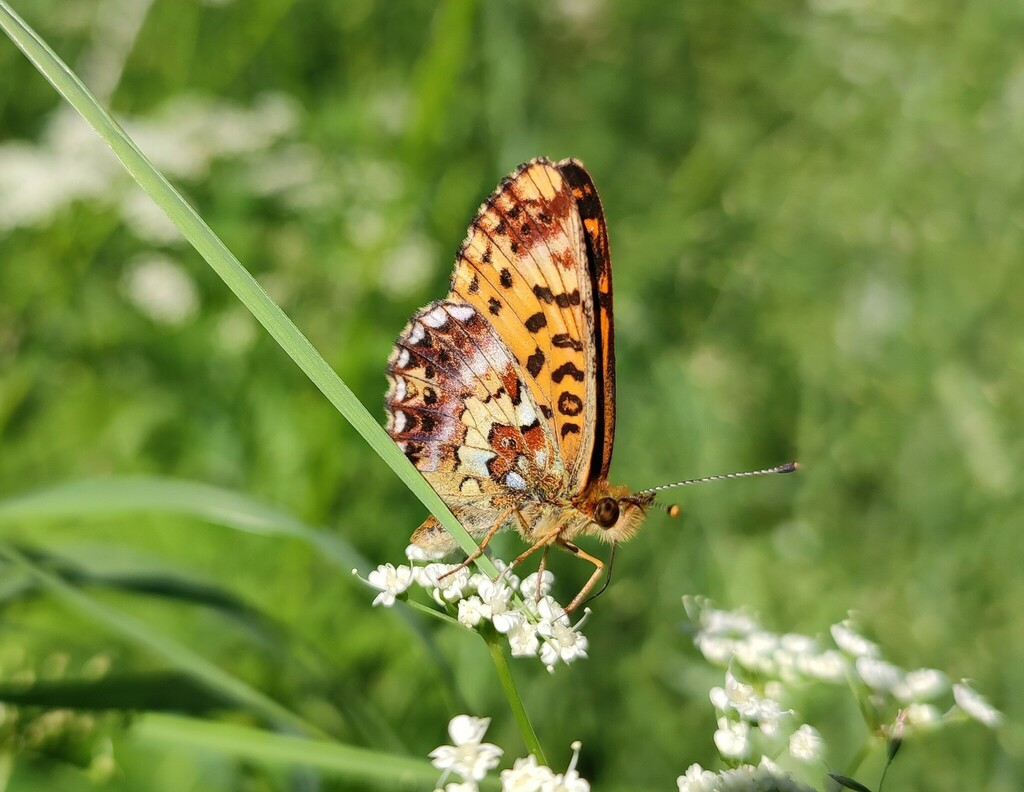

Scientific classification
- Kingdom: Animalia
- Phylum: Arthropoda
- Clade: Pancrustacea
- Class: Insecta
- Order: Lepidoptera
- Family: Nymphalidae
- Genus: Boloria
- Species: B. angarensis

Binomial name
- Boloria angarensis (Erschoff, 1870)

= Boloria angarensis =

Species of butterfly

Boloria angarensis is a small butterfly found in the Palearctic that belongs to the browns family.

== Subspecies ==
- Boloria angarensis angarensis Transbaikalia, South Siberia
- Boloria angarensis herzi (Wnukowsky, 1927) North Transbaikalia, Far East Yakutia
- Boloria angarensis sedychi (Weiss, 1964) Polar Urals, Yamal Peninsula
- Boloria angarensis alticola (Sushkin & Tschetverikov, 1907) Sayan, Tuva (mountains)
- Boloria angarensis hakutozana (Matsumura, 1927) Amur, Ussuri, N.Korea, NE.China
- Boloria angarensis miakei (Matsumura, 1919) Sakhalin

== Description from Seitz ==
A. angarensis Ersch. (67h). About the same size as the previous [A. iphigenia Graes]; the forewing less elongate. The underside of the hindwing bears a very close resemblance to that of A. selenis sibirica, but the costal spot of the median band is essentially different in shape, as shown in the figure. Moreover, angarensis has a row of silvery marginal spots, which are absent in sibirica or only indicated. The female larger and paler. — In Amurland, in June, locally very common.

== Biology ==
The larva feeds on Vaccinium.

== Etymology ==
Toponymic Angara
