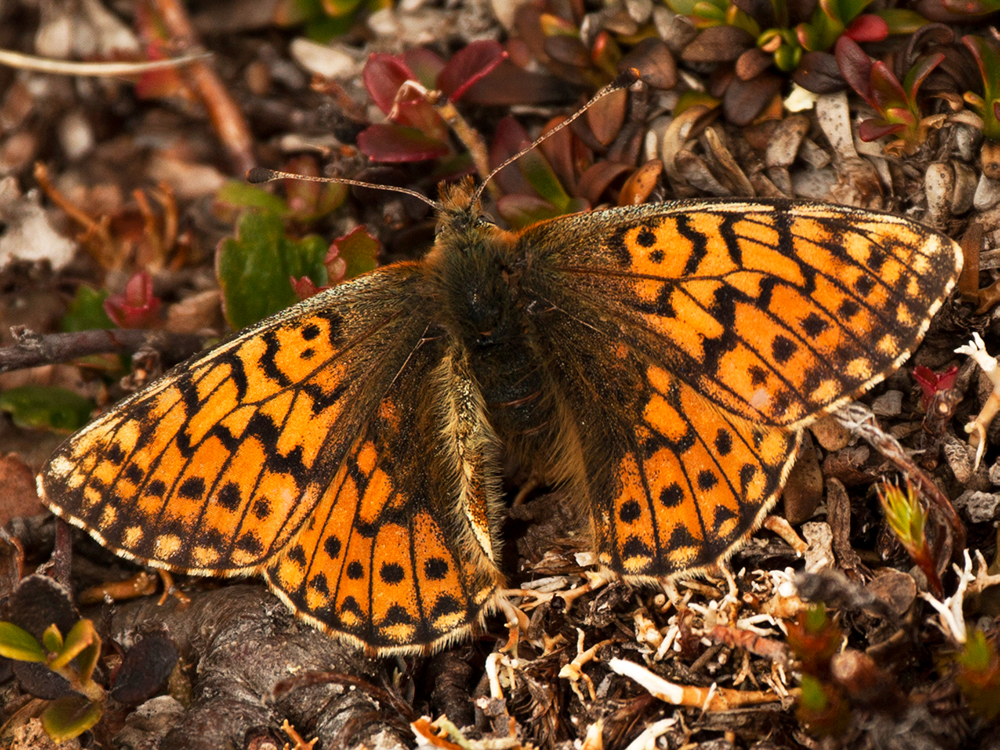
- Dorsal view

Scientific classification
- Domain: Eukaryota
- Kingdom: Animalia
- Phylum: Arthropoda
- Class: Insecta
- Order: Lepidoptera
- Family: Nymphalidae
- Genus: Boloria
- Species: B. napaea

Binomial name
- Boloria napaea Hoffmannsegg, 1804

= Boloria napaea =

Species of butterfly

Boloria napaea, the Napaea fritillary or mountain fritillary, is a butterfly of the family Nymphalidae.

== Distribution ==
In Europe the species is found in the Alps, mountainous areas in northern Scandinavia and very local in the eastern parts of the Pyrenees. In North America it is found in Alaska, northwestern Canada, and in small populations in the Canadian part of the Rocky Mountains, Alberta, and Wyoming. In Asia it is found in Siberia, the Altai Mountains, and the Amur Oblast.

== Description ==
The wingspan is 35–48 mm. The upperside is orange with brown basal suffusion and sometimes even purplish gray in the female, decorated with brown designs, with small scallops and a line of submarginal round dots. The hindwing forms an angle at its anterior edge.

On the forewing undersides the patterns are little marked, the apex is adorned pearly spots, and the hindwing undersides are clear because they are adorned with pearlescent designs.

The butterfly flies from June to August depending on the location.

In Europa the larvae feed on Viola species, especially V. biflora and also Polygonum viviparum. In North America it also feeds on Polygonum bistortoides.

== Boloria napaea napaea ==
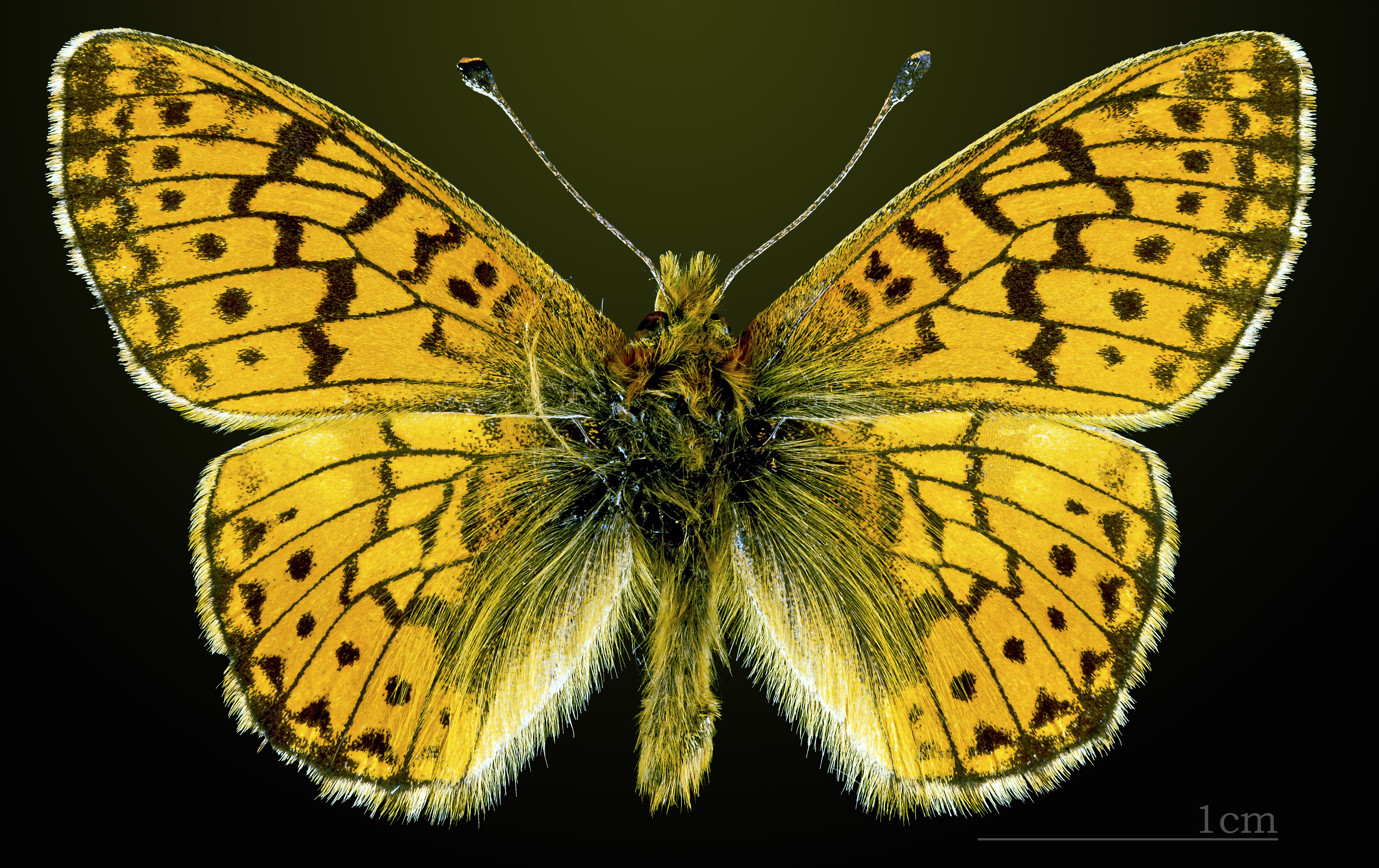
♂

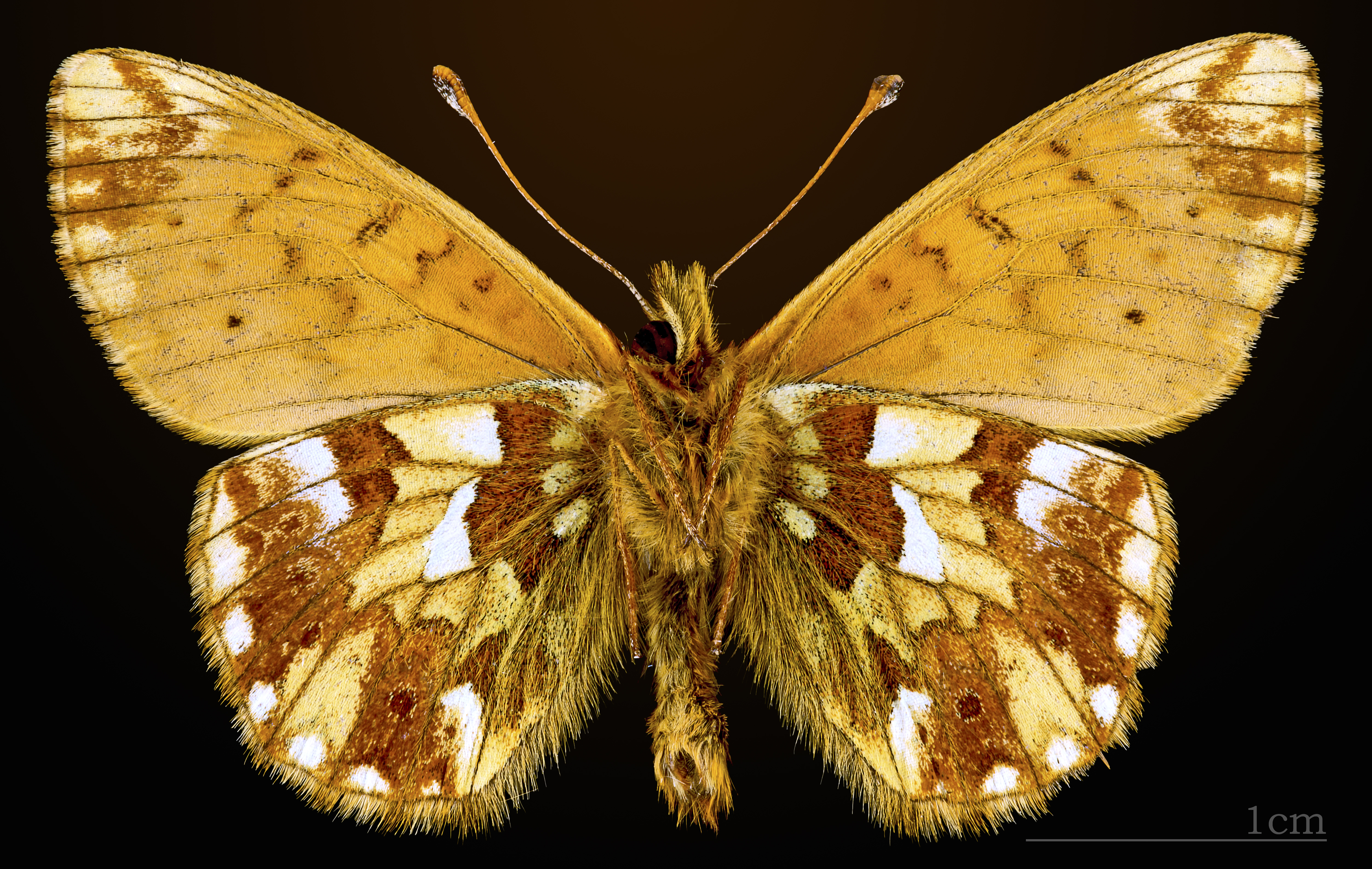
♂ △

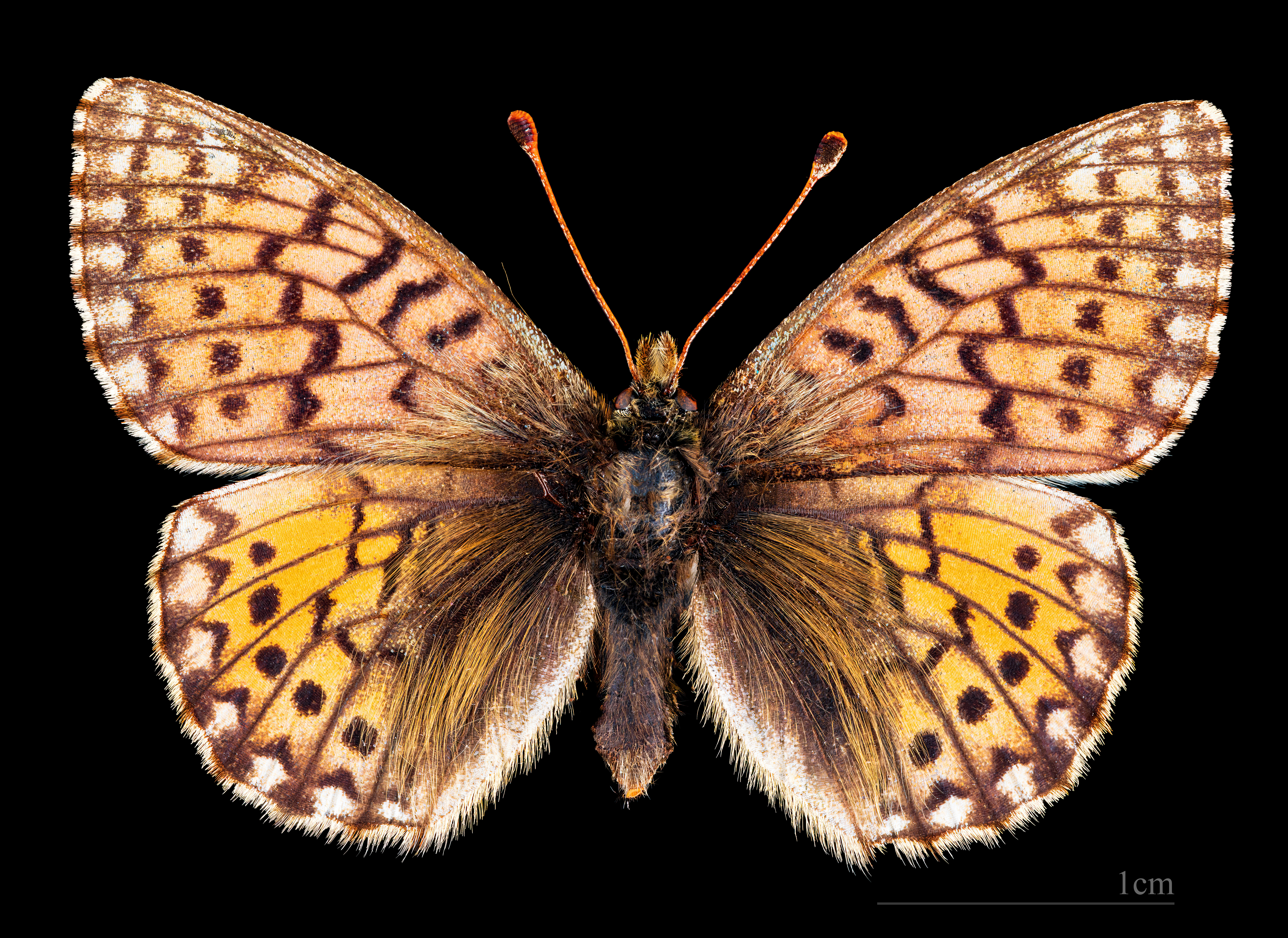
♀

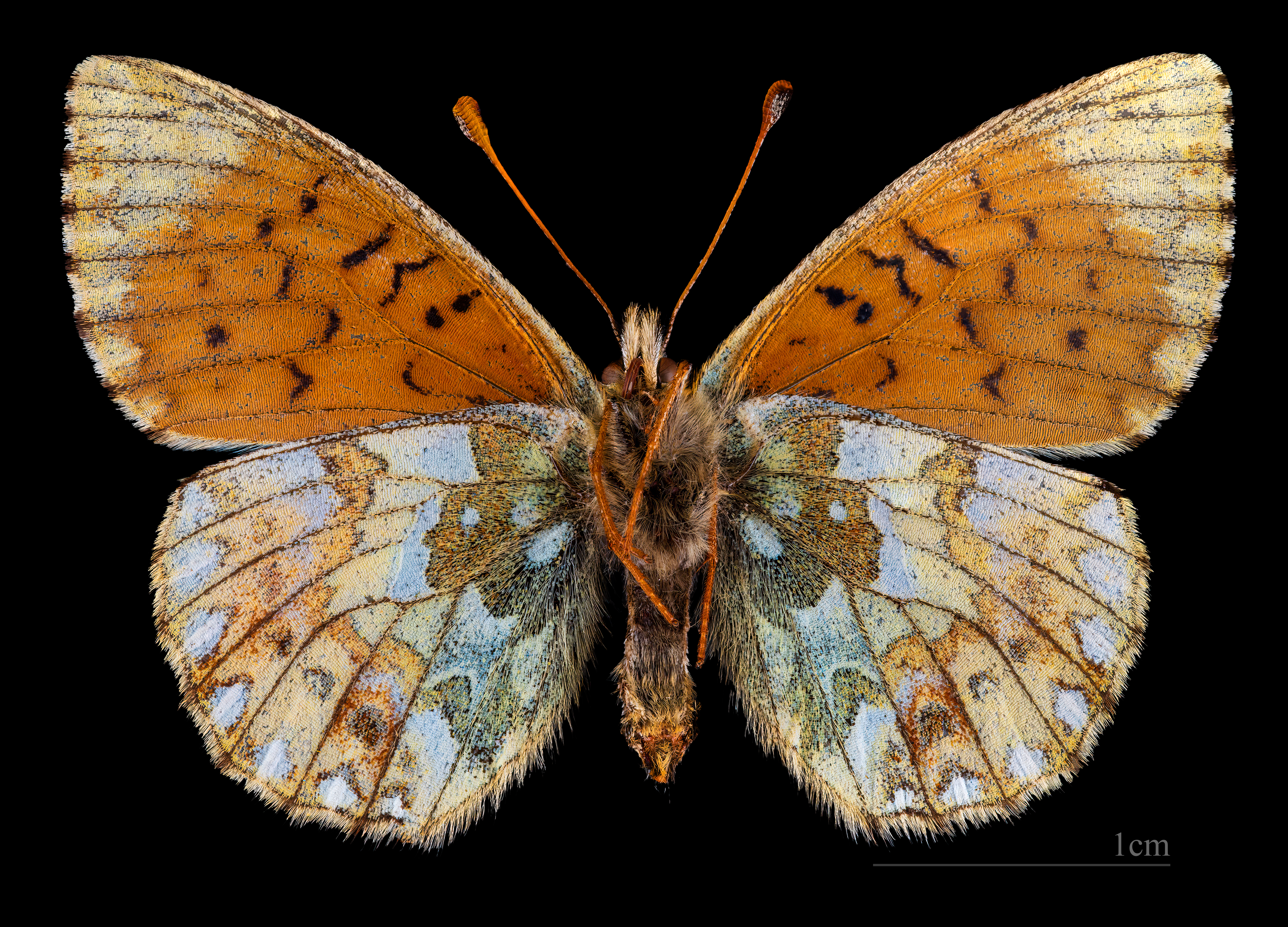
♀ △

== Subspecies ==
- B. n. altaica (Grum-Grshimailo, 1893) Tarbagatai, Sayan, Altai, South Transbaikalia, Mongolia
- B. n. pustagi Korshunov & Ivonin, 1995 Northeast Altai
- B. n. vinokurovi Dubatolov, 1992 East Yakutia
- B. n. contaminata Gorbunov, 2007
