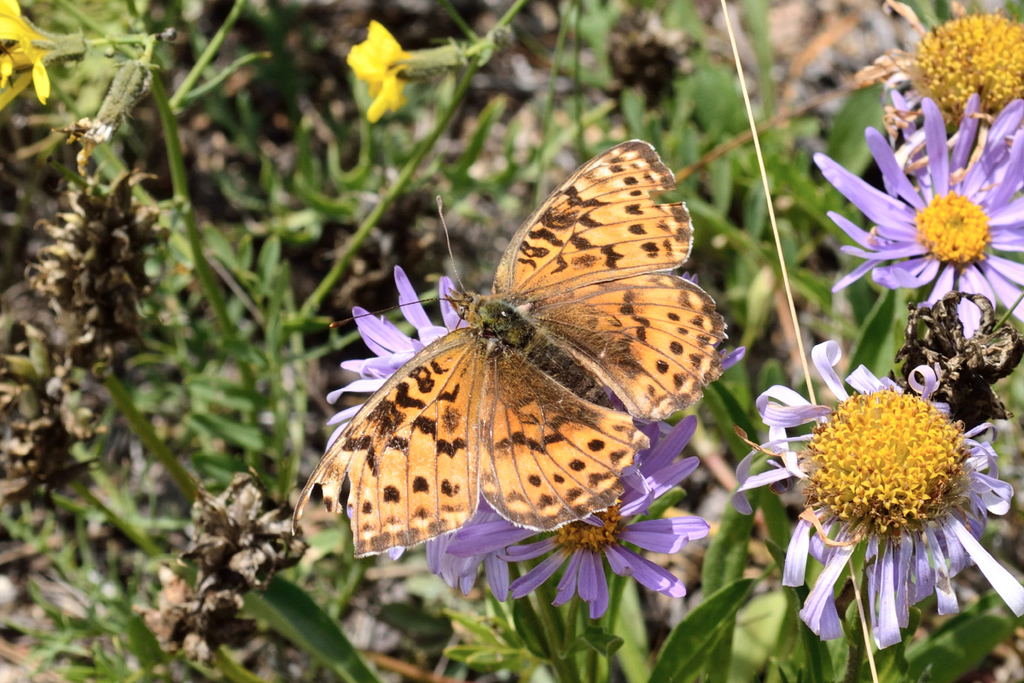

Scientific classification
- Domain: Eukaryota
- Kingdom: Animalia
- Phylum: Arthropoda
- Class: Insecta
- Order: Lepidoptera
- Family: Nymphalidae
- Genus: Boloria
- Species: B. tritonia

Binomial name
- Boloria tritonia (Böber, 1812)

Synonyms
- Papilio tritonia Böber, 1812; Clossiana tritonia (Böber, 1812)

= Boloria tritonia =

Species of butterfly

Boloria tritonia is a species of butterfly found in the East Palearctic that belongs to the Nymphalidae family.

== Description ==
The hind wing underside ground colour is ochre-orange, the discal band evenly ochre or whitish-coloured, with a slight suffusion of dark scales. The general pattern is more bright and the dark basal suffusion on hind wing upperside is less expressed than in related species and the male genitalia are diagnostic.

== Subspecies ==
- B. t. tritonia — Baikal
- B. t. amphilochus (Ménétriés, 1859) — Amur, Ussuri
- B. t. barkalovi (Dubatolov, 2010)

== Biology ==
The larva on feeds on Saxifraga bronchialis.

== See also ==
- List of butterflies of Europe
