= Grubbdalen Nature Reserve =

Nature reserve in Sweden

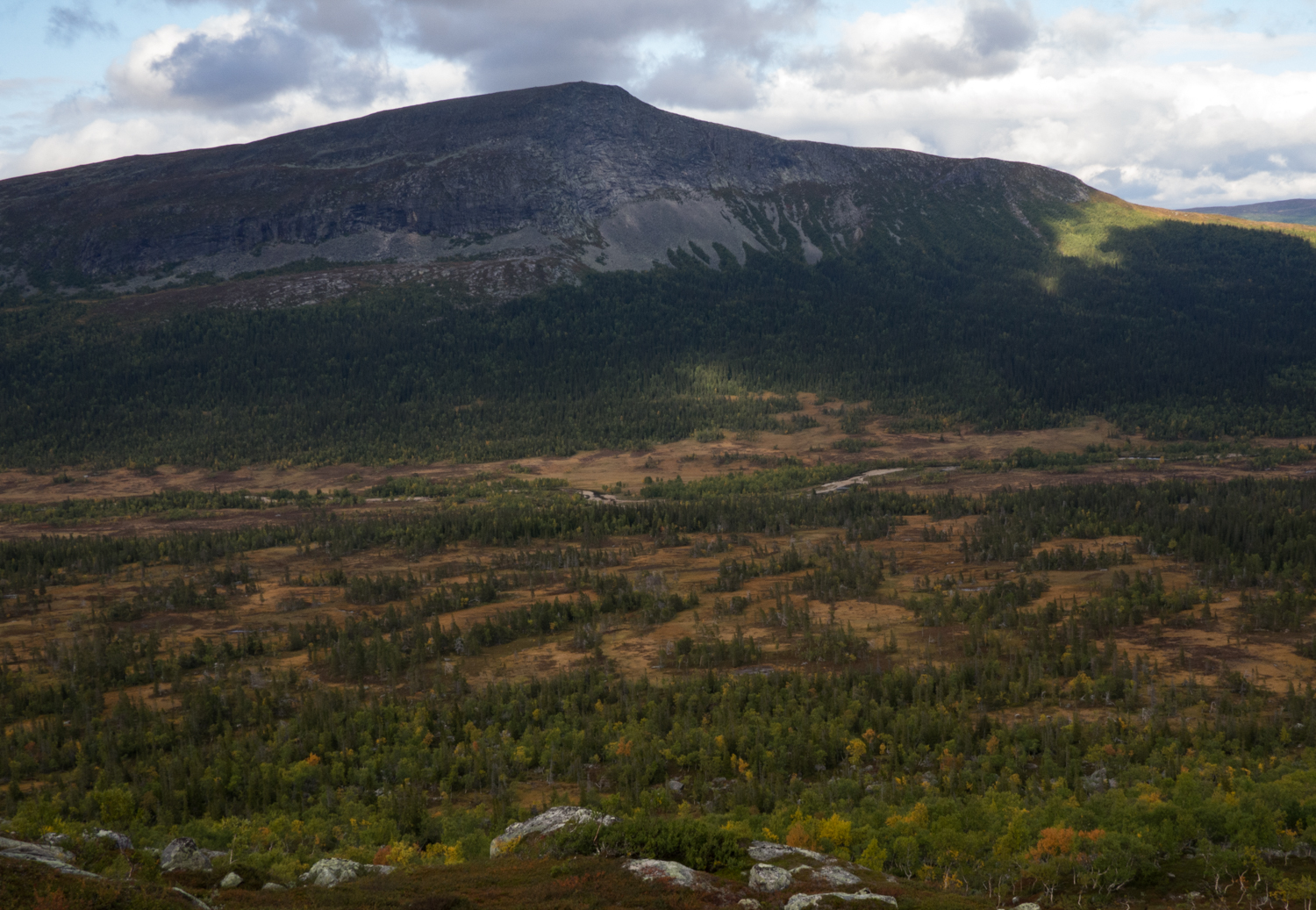
- Grubbdalen Nature Rerserve with the peak Juthatten in the background

- Location within Jämtland Location within Sweden
- Location: Sweden
- Nearest city: Östersund
- Coordinates: 64°02′22″N 13°42′44″E
- Area: 21 km^{2} (5,200 acres)
- Established: 2003

Grubbdalen Nature Reserve (Swedish: Grubbdalens naturreservat) is a nature reserve in Jämtland County in Sweden. It is part of the EU-wide Natura 2000-network.

The nature reserve consists of parts of a valley between the Norwegian parts of the Scandinavian Mountains and a lower part of the mountain chain on the Swedish side of the border. At the bottom of the valley runs a small river, surrounded by tree-less bogs. Higher up the valley is richly forested, containing old-growth spruce forest and on the higher altitudes downy birch. The landscape has been characterized by its use by Sami people for a very long time, and formerly the valley also housed resident farmers; around 1900 eight families lived permanently here. Today there is no permanent population but the area is still used by the Sami as pasture for reindeer.

The flora of the nature reserve is relatively rich and includes among other species alpine yellow-violet, calypso orchid and February daphne. The fauna includes moose and brown bear, and occasionally also wolverine and Eurasian lynx.
