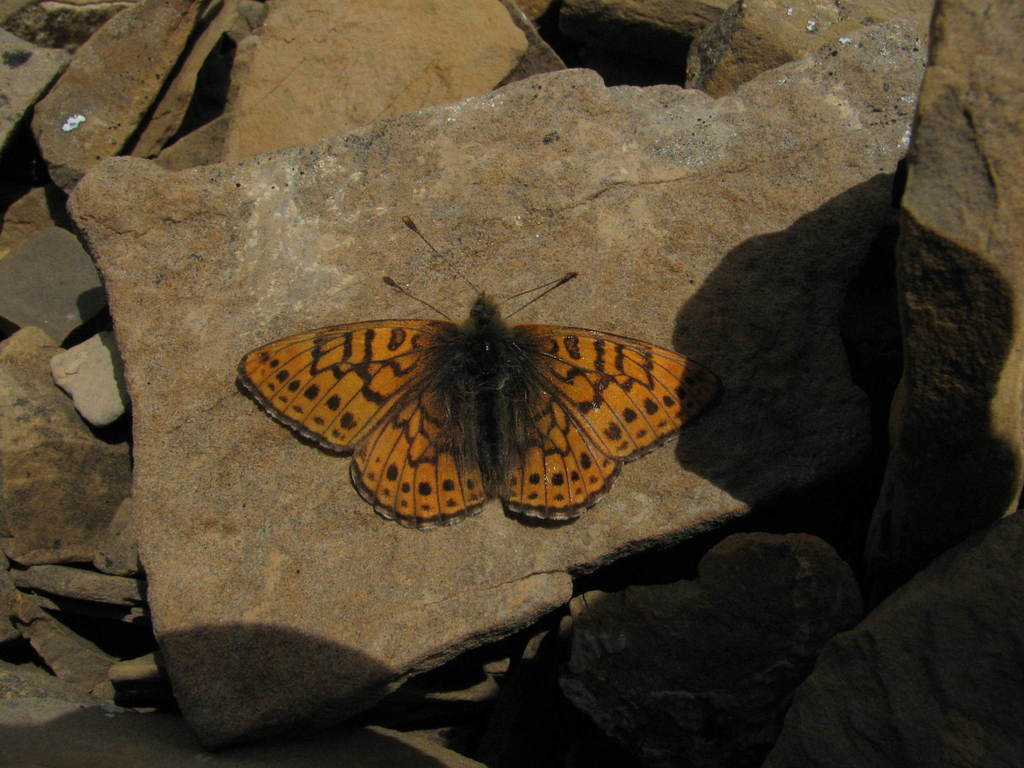

Conservation status
- Secure (NatureServe)

Scientific classification
- Domain: Eukaryota
- Kingdom: Animalia
- Phylum: Arthropoda
- Class: Insecta
- Order: Lepidoptera
- Family: Nymphalidae
- Genus: Boloria
- Species: B. astarte

Binomial name
- Boloria astarte (Doubleday, [1847])

Synonyms
- Clossiana astarte; Brenthis astarte; Argynnis victoria Edwards, 1891

= Boloria astarte =

Species of butterfly

Boloria astarte, the Astarte fritillary, is a butterfly of the family Nymphalidae. It is found from northwestern North America to northeastern Siberia. It is found as far south as Montana and Washington.

The wingspan is 42–51 mm. The butterfly flies from mid-June to mid-August.

The larvae feed on spotted saxifrage (Saxifraga bronchialis).

== Subspecies ==
- Boloria astarte astarte (northern British Columbia)
- Boloria astarte distincta (Alaska, Yukon and Northwest Territories)
