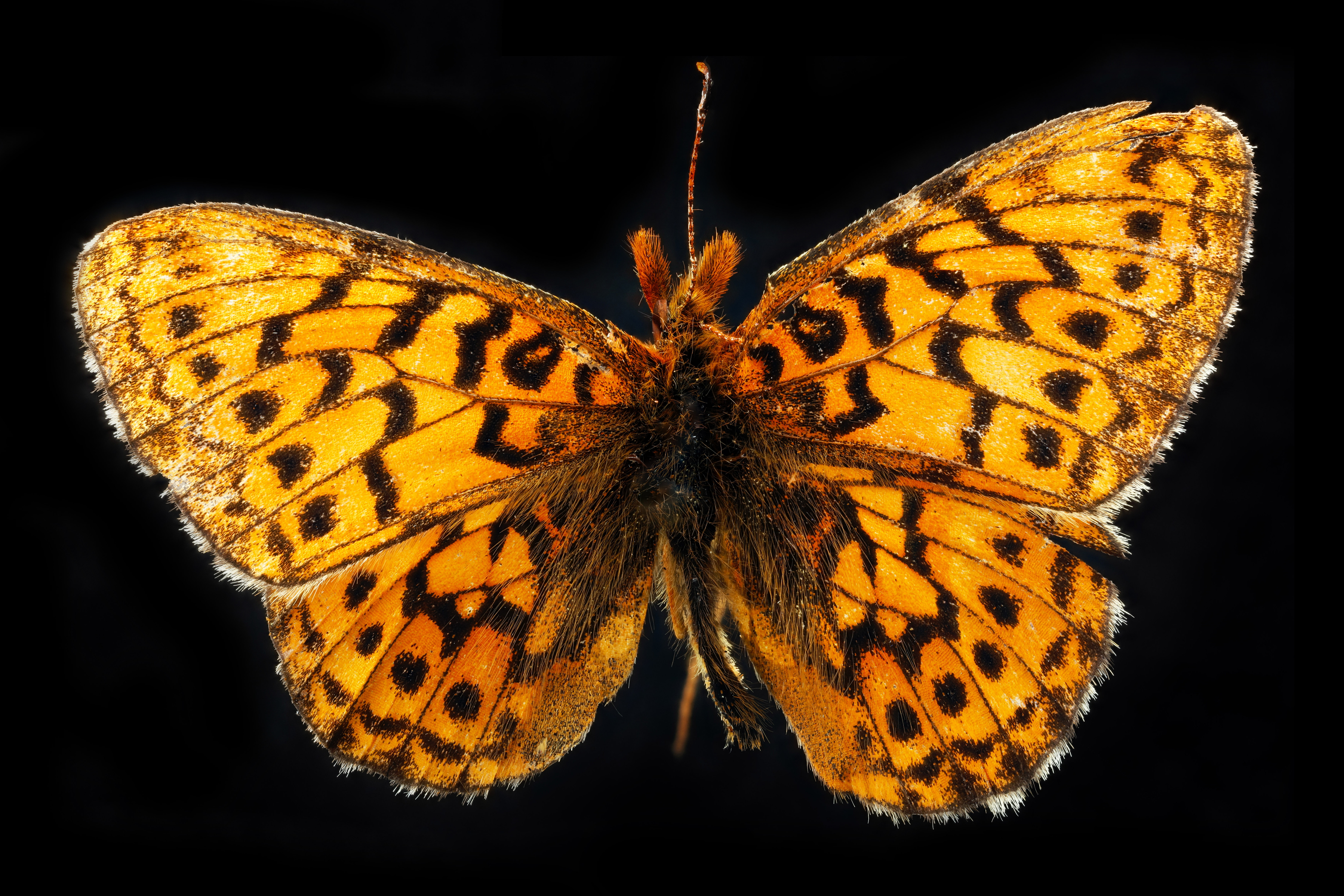

Scientific classification
- Domain: Eukaryota
- Kingdom: Animalia
- Phylum: Arthropoda
- Class: Insecta
- Order: Lepidoptera
- Family: Nymphalidae
- Genus: Boloria
- Species: B. kriemhild

Binomial name
- Boloria kriemhild (Strecker, 1879)

= Boloria kriemhild =

Species of butterfly

Boloria kriemhild, the relict fritillary, is a species of fritillary butterfly in the family Nymphalidae. It is found in North America.

The MONA or Hodges number for Boloria kriemhild is 4468.
