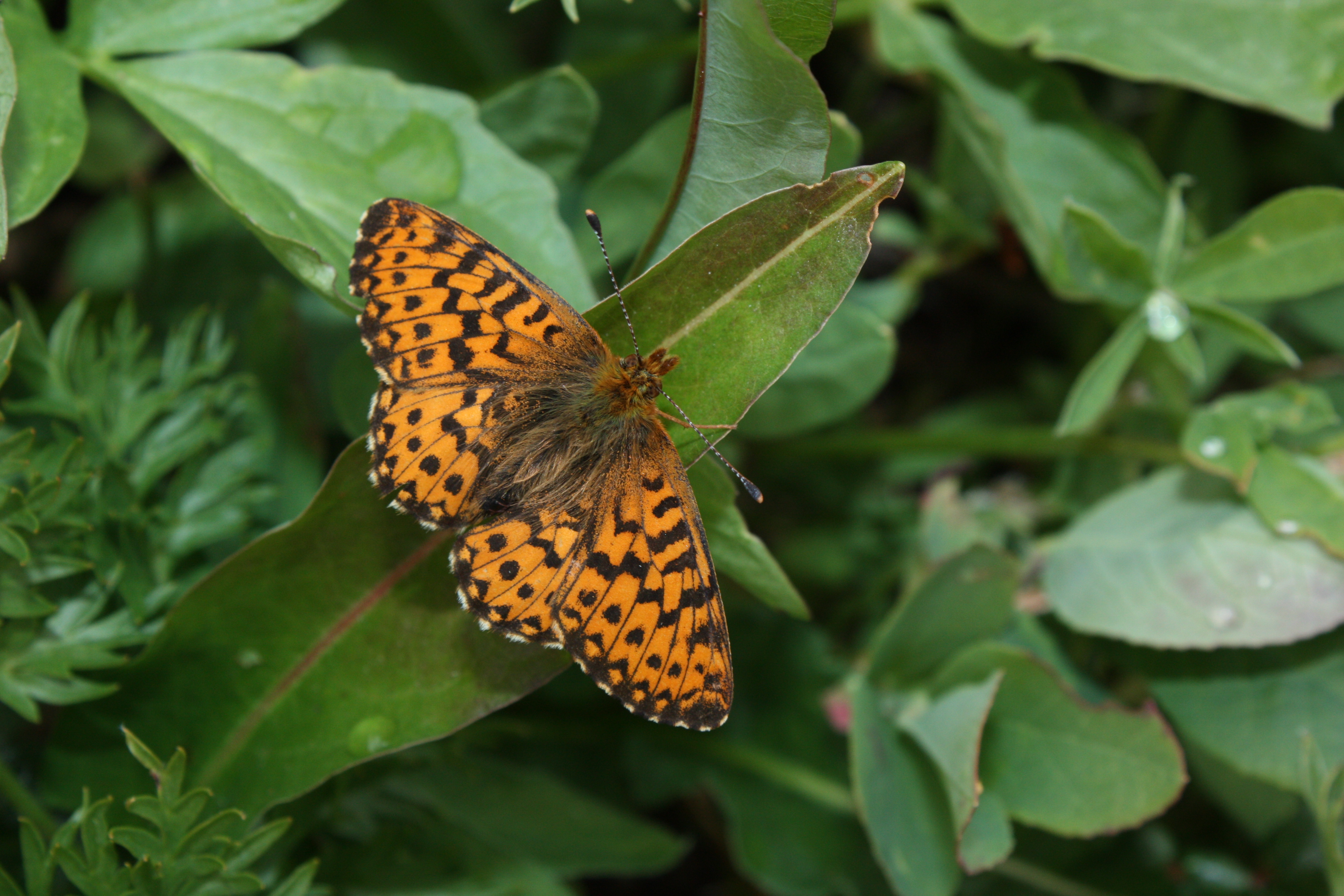
- B. c. montinus in Mount Rainier National Park, Washington, U.S.

Scientific classification
- Domain: Eukaryota
- Kingdom: Animalia
- Phylum: Arthropoda
- Class: Insecta
- Order: Lepidoptera
- Family: Nymphalidae
- Genus: Boloria
- Species: B. chariclea

Binomial name
- Boloria chariclea Schneider, 1794

Synonyms
- Boloria montinus

= Boloria chariclea =

Arctic fritillary

Species of butterfly

Boloria chariclea, the Arctic fritillary or purplish fritillary, is a butterfly of the family Nymphalidae. It is found in the northern parts of the Palearctic and Nearctic realms.

== Description ==
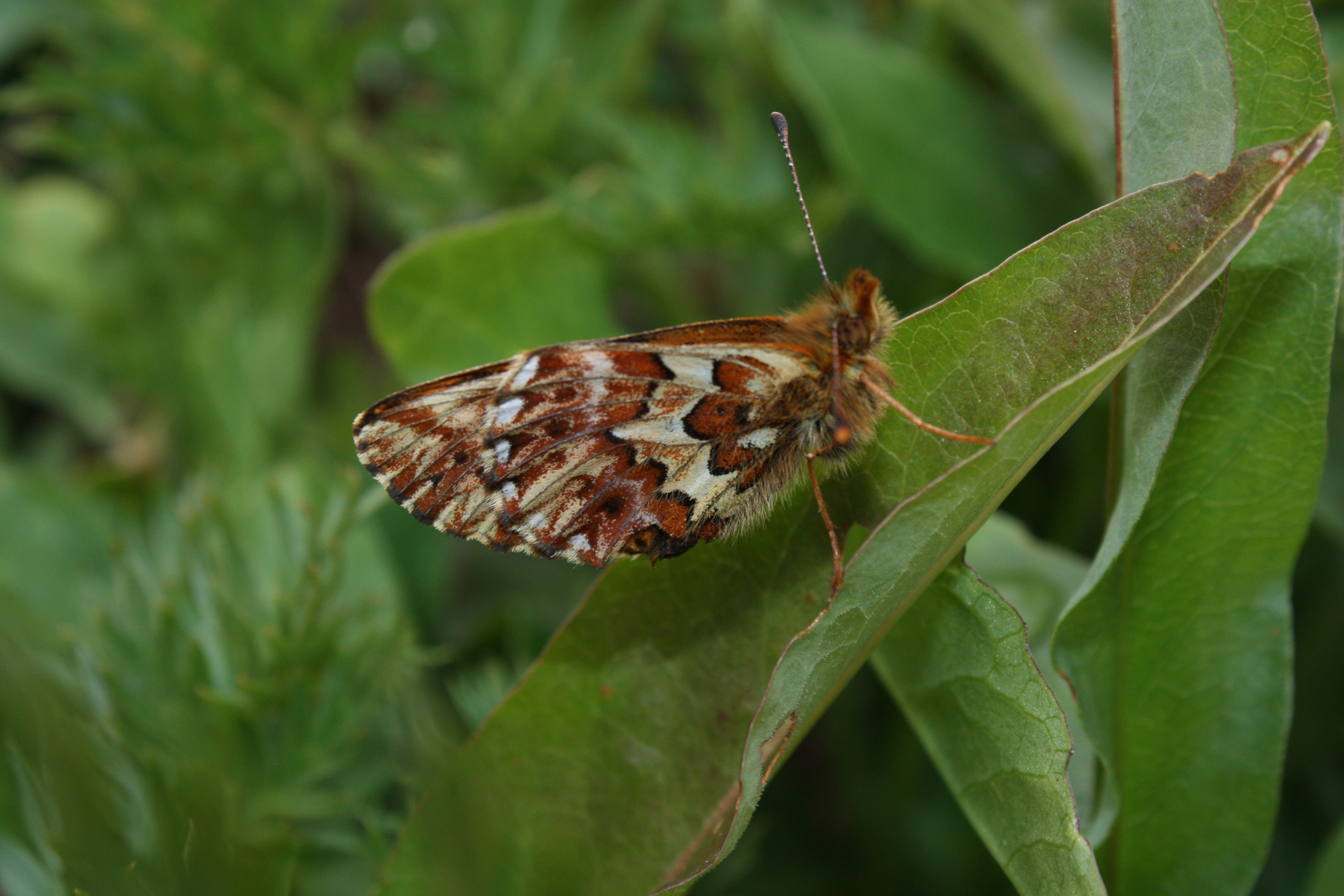
B. c. montinus wing underside

The butterfly flies from July to August depending on the location.

== Distribution and habitat ==
The Arctic fritillary has a Holarctic distribution. In Europe it is found in northern Lapland and Russia. In North America it is found in Alaska and much of Canada, the north Cascades, the Rocky Mountains southwards to Utah and northern New Mexico, northern Minnesota, northern Maine and the White Mountains of New Hampshire. Its typical habitat is tundra, taiga, alpine meadows, stream verges and acid bogs.

== Life cycle ==
The males patrol along the edges of bogs and in valleys and wait for the arrival of females. The eggs are laid singly underneath the leaves of the host plant. In North America the larvae feed on viola species, dwarf willows (Salix) and possibly blueberries (Vaccinium) while in Europe it is believed to feed on yellow wood violet (Viola biflora) and Arctic white heather (Cassiope tetragona). Depending on location, the larvae take one or two years to develop into adults, newly hatched caterpillars hibernate during the first winter and fourth-stage caterpillars hibernate during the second.

== Subspecies ==
- B. c. chariclea Arctic Europe
- B. c. arctica (Zetterstedt, 1839) Arctic Asia, Wrangel Island, Chukotka
- B. c. butleri (Edwards, 1883) Arctic America, Chukotka, Kamchatka
- B. c. boisduvalii (Duponchel, 1832) Alaska, Alberta, Labrador, Newfoundland, Minnesota, British Columbia
- B. c. rainieri (Barnes & McDunnough, 1913) Washington
- B. c. grandis (Barnes & McDunnough, 1916) North British Columbia, Ontario
- B. c. montina (Scudder, 1863)
- B. c. helena (Edwards, 1871) Rocky Mountains

== Etymology ==
Named in the Classical tradition. Chariclea (Chariklo) is the favorite and friend of Athena.
