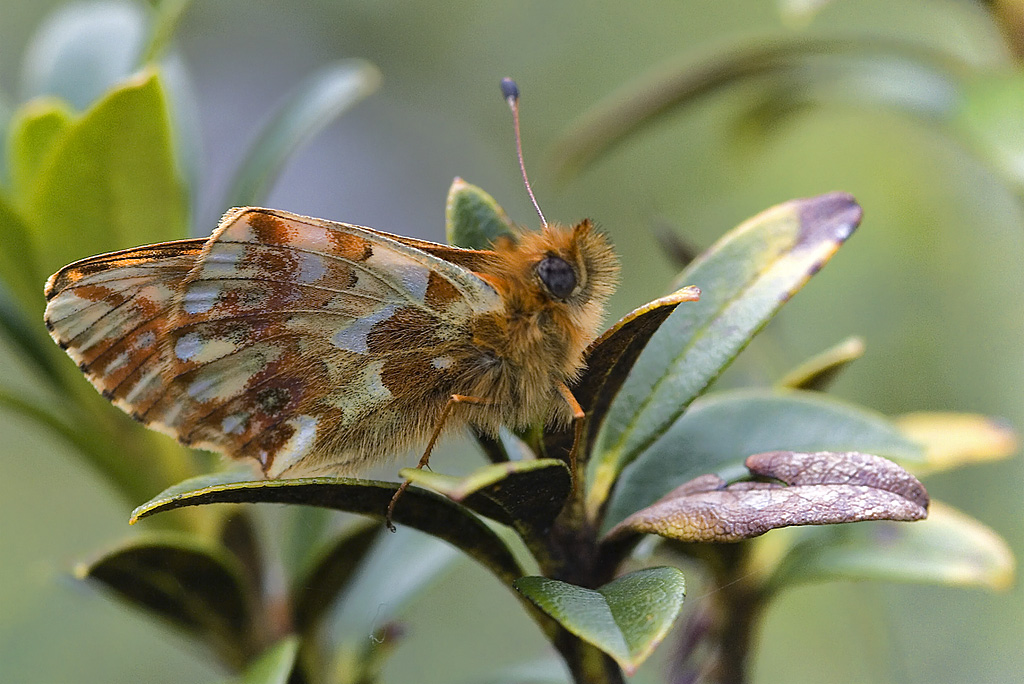

Scientific classification
- Kingdom: Animalia
- Phylum: Arthropoda
- Clade: Pancrustacea
- Class: Insecta
- Order: Lepidoptera
- Family: Nymphalidae
- Genus: Boloria
- Species: B. pales

Binomial name
- Boloria pales (Denis & Schiffermüller, 1775)

Synonyms
- Argynnis pales

= Boloria pales =

Shepherd's fritillary

Species of butterfly

Boloria pales, the shepherd's fritillary, is a butterfly of the family Nymphalidae. It is found from the Cantabrian Mountains and the Pyrenees through the Alps and Apennine Mountains east to the Balkan, Carpathian Mountains, the Caucasus and central Asia up to western China.

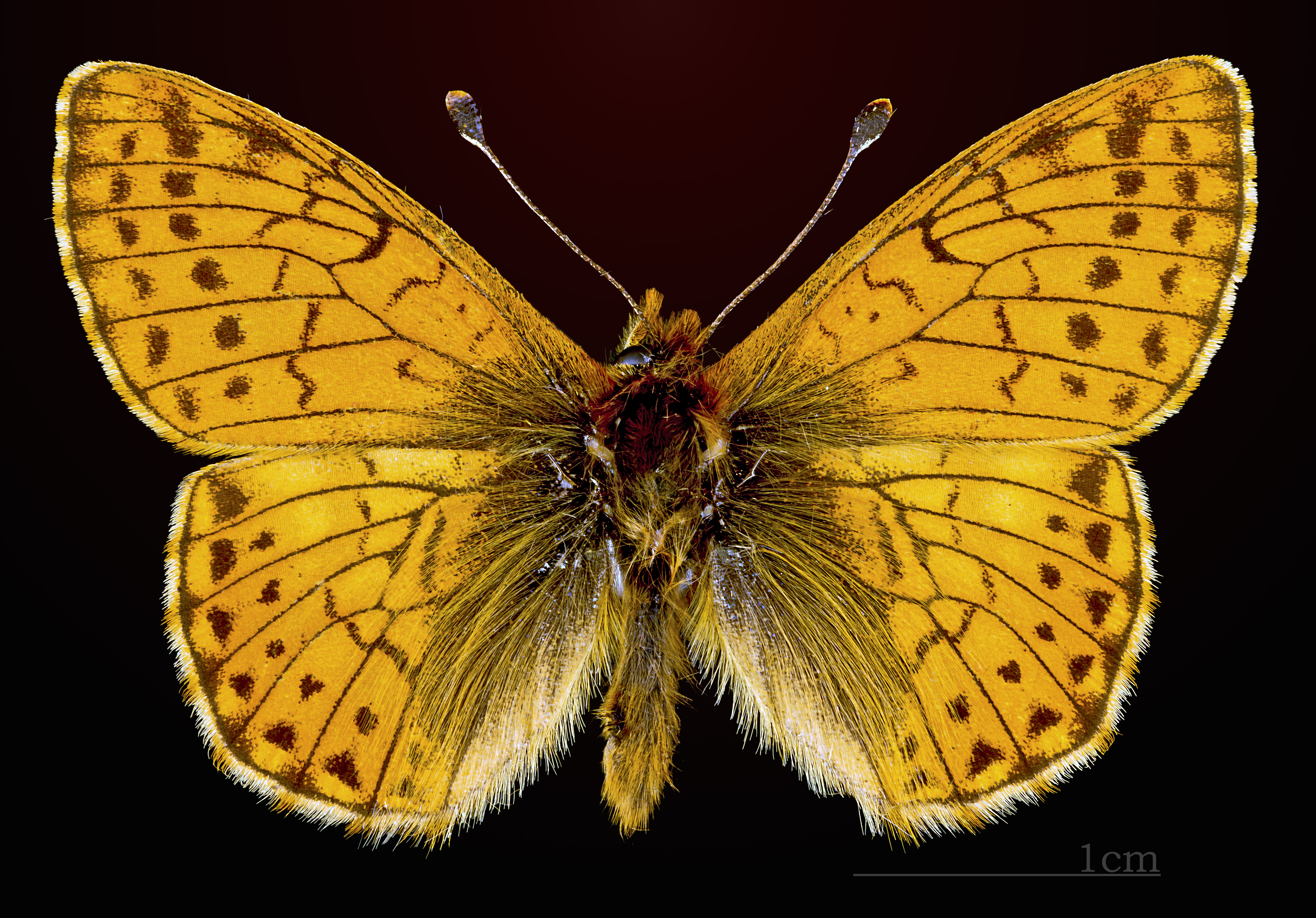
Boloria pales pales

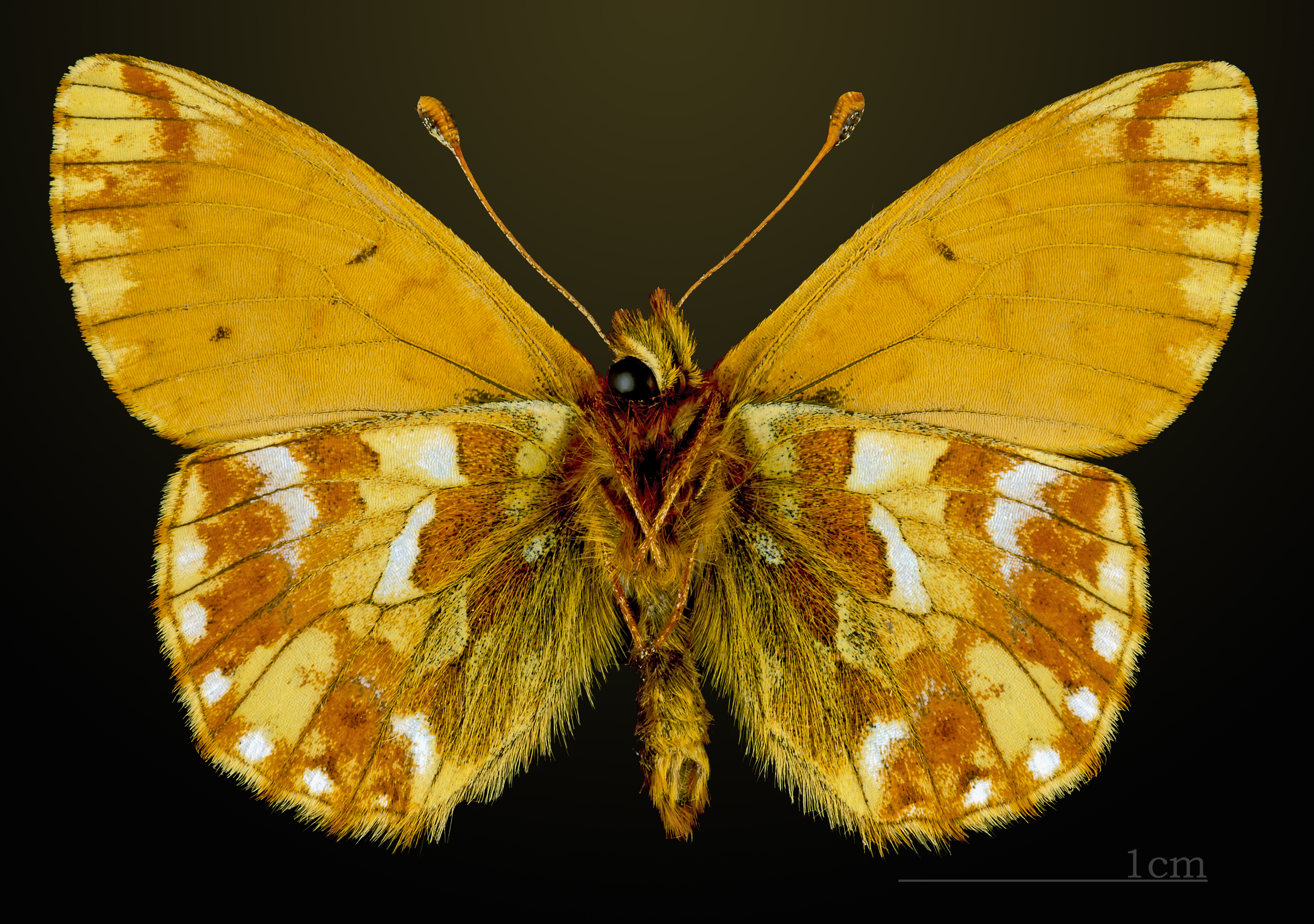
Underside Boloria pales pales

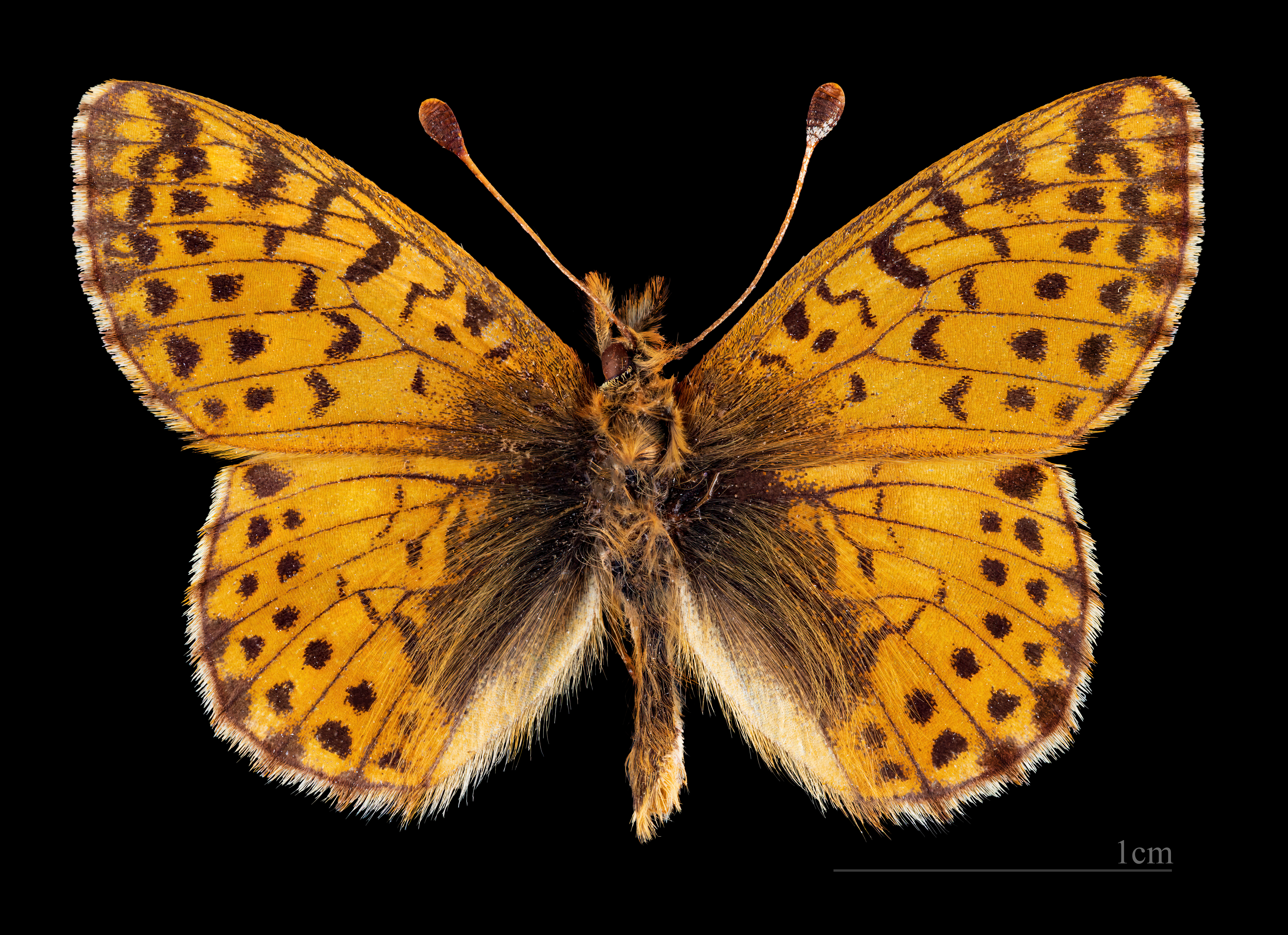
Boloria pales palustris

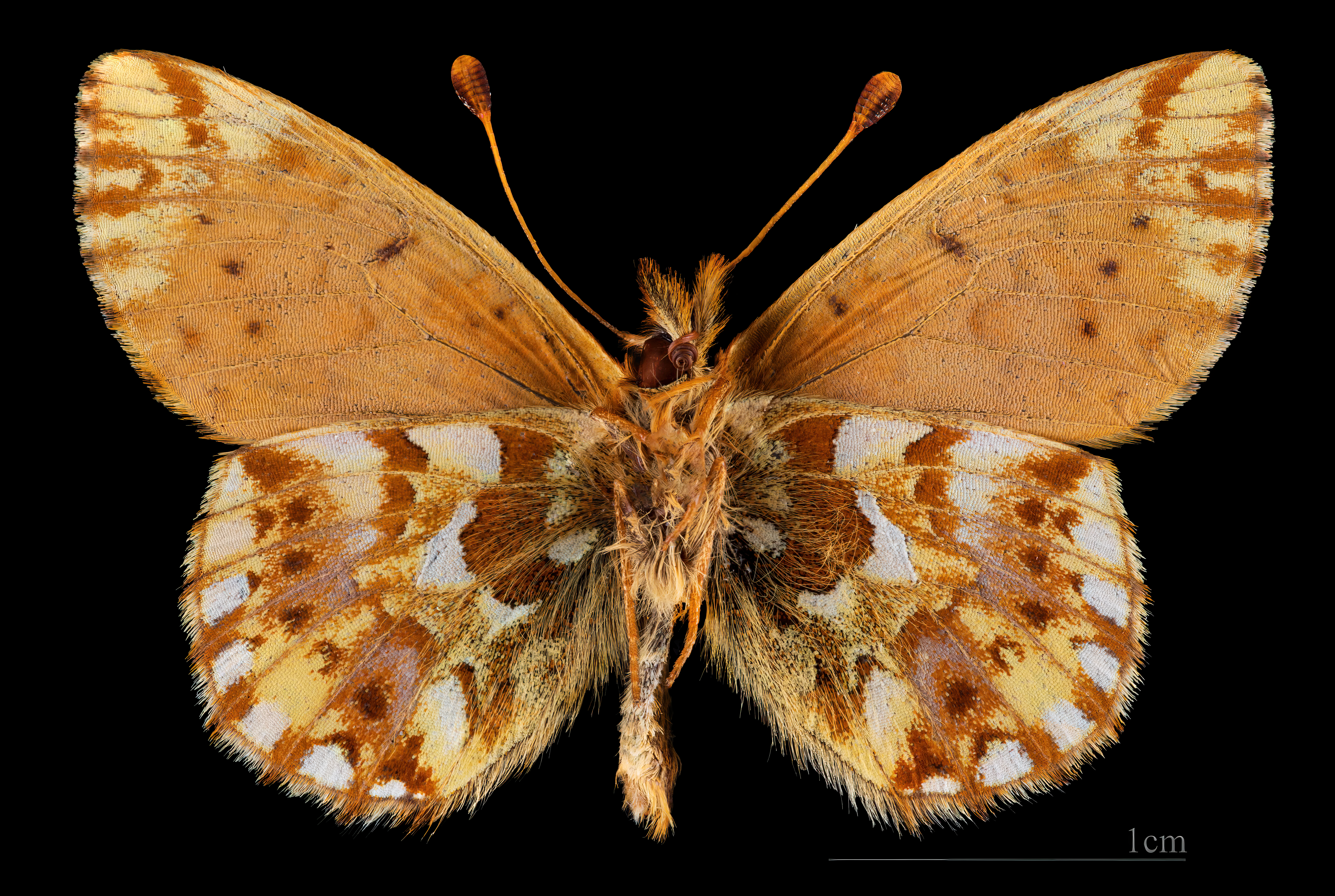
△ Boloria pales palustris

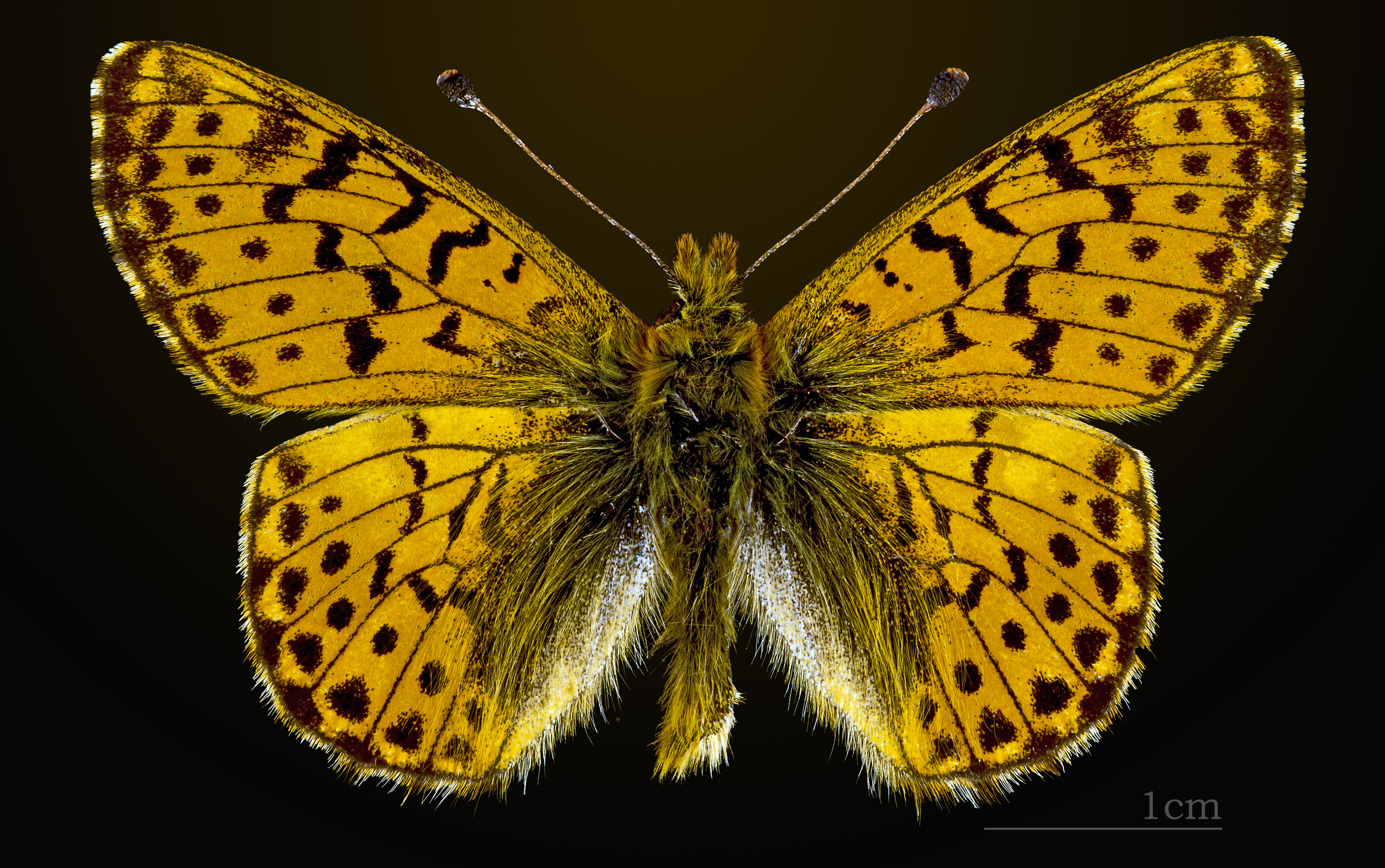
Boloria pales pyrenesmiscens

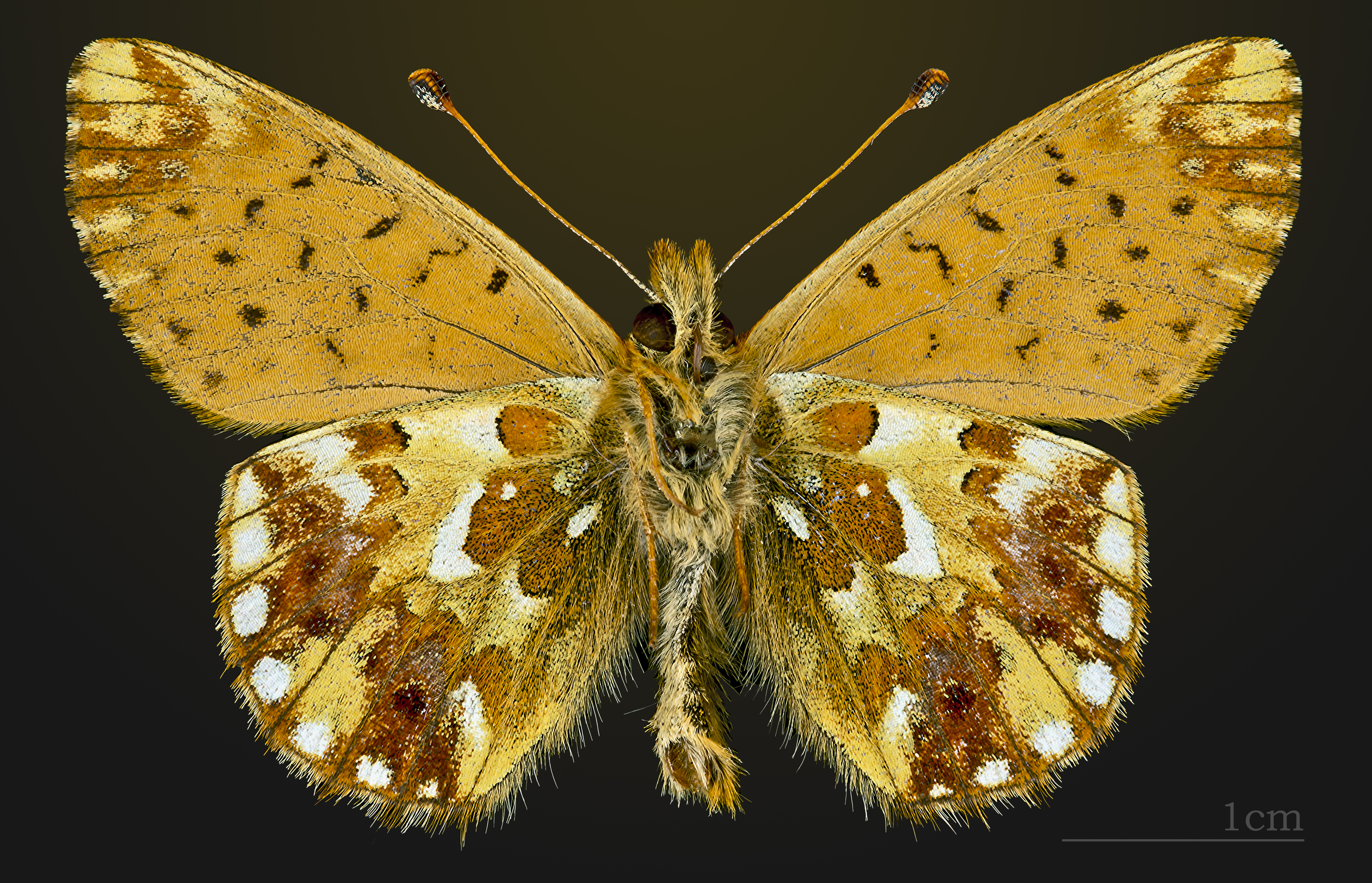
Underside Boloria pales pyrenesmiscens

The wingspan is 25–30 mm. The wing tops of the relatively narrow forewings, are usually orange-brown and are traversed by a fine, black pattern consisting of dots and lines as are the hindwings. Slightly darkened or strongly melanistic moths are less common. Characteristic is the strong rust-red underside of the hind wings, which is very strong in this species and is only interrupted by a few irregular yellowish markings.

== Description in Seitz ==
A. pales. Varying above from fiery red-yellow to nearly black, the markings also being very variable, all intergradations occurring between specimens with only vestiges of black and such with the black markings so heavy and confluent that the ground-colour is suppressed. Recognized by the characteristic underside of the hindwing, and especially by the shape of the hindwing, which has a nearly straight costal margin forming almost a right angle with the outer margin. The species is distributed all over Europe, Central and Northern Asia, being partly confined to the high mountains. In the Himalayas it is one of the few Argynnis which extend into Indian territory; it is absent from North Africa and Japan. — True pales Schiff. (67i) is characterized by a red-brown upperside, which bears moderately heavy black markings, and above all by the forewing beneath having hardly any black spots and the hindwing beneath being but sparsely marked with silver. The colour of the upperside is occasionally pale ochreous: ab. isis Hbn. (67i), or may be shaded with dark olivaceous greenish, which occurs only in the female: ab. napaea Hbn. (67i). Specimens with the upperside almost entirely black, bearing only vestiges of the reddish yellow ground-colour in the outer area, are ab. thales Schultz. In ab. medio- mediofasciata Schultz the great development of black is confined to the median area. In ab. killiasi Ruhl the markings of the forewing are absent apart from slight traces, but rather more strongly developed on the hindwing than usual, the base, disc and the veins being more extended black. — graeca Stgr. [ now species Boloria graeca (Staudinger, 1870)] from the Veluchi Mts. in Greece, but which I also received from the Parnassus through Herr Kraeber, is a rather large form, whose male is very bright red; it differs in the very distinct ocelli in the outer half of the hindwing beneath and in the chequered fringes; somewhat resembling arsilache by the strong markings of the underside of the forewing. — Specimens from the mountains of the Balkan Peninsula, called balcanica by Rebel [now Boloria graeca balcanica (Rebel, 1903)], forma transition to graeca. — caucasica Stgr. (= arsilache H.-Sch.) (68b) is smaller, the male is likewise very bright brick-red above, but much paler beneath, and the dark markings of the female are sometimes as if dusted with flour. — sifanica Gr.-Grsh. [now subspecies B. pales sifanica (Grum-Grshimailo, 1891)], from Amdo in Tibet, differs from caucasica only in being smaller, which character is of little weight considering the great variability of pales in one and the same place. — arsilache Esp. (= napaea Dup.) (68a) is the form of the plains, recognizable by the distinctly black-spotted underside of the forewing, the spots being sometimes as prominent as above. Also the shape of the insect is different, the wings being broader and more rounded, and the specimens usually larger than alpine pales. In North-East Europe (Russia, North-East Germany), in swamps, and at the border of lakes of Western Switzerland (Wallis, Waadt) and Graubunden; also in Siberia. — inducta Spangh.[typo] is a darkened form of northern arsilache, corresponding to the napaea-form of pales. — As lapponica Stgr.[ now B. aquilonaris aquilonaris specimens from western North Europe have been separated (Lapponia, Scandinavia, Belgium) which connect pales with arsilache; it is smaller than arsilache, the forewing beneath bears diffuse markings, which are hardly more washed out than in certain specimens from the high Alps and much less than in individuals from East-Prussia and Russia. — generator Stgr. [ now Boloria generator (Staudinger, 1886)](68a) has in the male the upperside very bright reddish yellow with very small dot-like markings, which are sometimes obsolete in the median area, while the female bears whitish lunules before the outer margin. Throughout Central Asia. — korla Fruhst. [ now Boloria sipora korla (Fruhstorfer, 1904)](68a) is a much larger form; the upperside, is as red as in the preceding, but has a violet gloss, the wings being broad and strongly rounded, and the markings of the hindwing beneath dull and obsolescent; from Korla. — eupalesFruhst. [ now subspecies B. p. eupales(Fruhstorfer, 1903)] (68b) is characterized by the very brightly variegated underside, beautiful moss-green spots alternating with cinnamon smears, which are both much more dentate and indented than in nymotypical pales; the silvery gloss, however, is strongly reduced; in Tibet, at 9000 ft., rare. — palina Fruhst. [ now subspecies B. p. palina] (Fruhstorfer, 1904) (68b), from West China, is a rather small form, whose female is strongly marked above and has but little silvery gloss beneath; the red-brown colour strongly enlarged in all the spots, bands and dots; Sze-chuen. — darjana Stgr. i. I. (68a) is still more fiery red than generator, the median area is entirely without markings and the black colour is reduced at the base of the forewing and the abdominal margin of the hindwing; from Syr-Darja. — Whereas the forms from Central Asia mentioned above belong to the pales-series, a form from Kentei which Herr Bang-Haas has kindly sent me is an arsilache; its upperside is very strongly spotted with black, the forewing beneath bearing weak spots and the hindwing being very silvery. I name it banghaasi form. nov. [ now Boloria banghaasi Seitz, 1909](68a). — At the boundary of the Palearctic Region, in the North- Western Himalayas, there occur several more forms of this widely distribute species, for instance sipora Moore (68b); forewing above and beneath as in arsilache, the black markings abundant and rather prominent; the spots in the middle of the forewing thinner and sparser in the male, the base on the contrary very black, so much so in the female that on the hindwing only the outer marginal area is not black; from Kashmir. — baralacha Moore [now Boloria sipora (Moore, [1875])] (68b) differs from sipora mainly in the sparse markings of both sides; the base of the wingsis hardly blackened in the male and the hindwing beneath is almost unicolorous on account of the various colours being weak and diffuse; likewise in the North- Western Himalayas. There occur all intergradations between these two forms.

— The larva paler or darker brown, with a dark dorsal line bordered by light spots, in front of the spines of each segment velvety black spots; the dorsal spines yellowish, the lateral ones whitish, between the latter yellowish tubercles; head black with yellowish brown eye-spots; prolegs reddish brown. From July until June on Violaceae. Pupa greyish brown, with blackish markings. The butterflies are not rare in most places where they occur, the alpine forms often appearing even in abundance. Fresh males are very fiery red when on the wing, almost like Melitaea didyma males. They rush close along the ground in a straight and very fast flight rapidly moving the wings up and down, and love to bask with widespread wings on warm stones. They visit flowers of all kinds, especially Composites and Calamint. The habits of the arsilache of the northern moors and of the small high-alpine pales differ in several points.

== Biology ==
Adults are on wing from June to August depending on the location. There is one generation per year.

The larvae feed on various low growing plants, but prefer Viola species.

== Etymology ==
Named in the Classical tradition. Pales was a Roman deity of shepherds and flocks.
