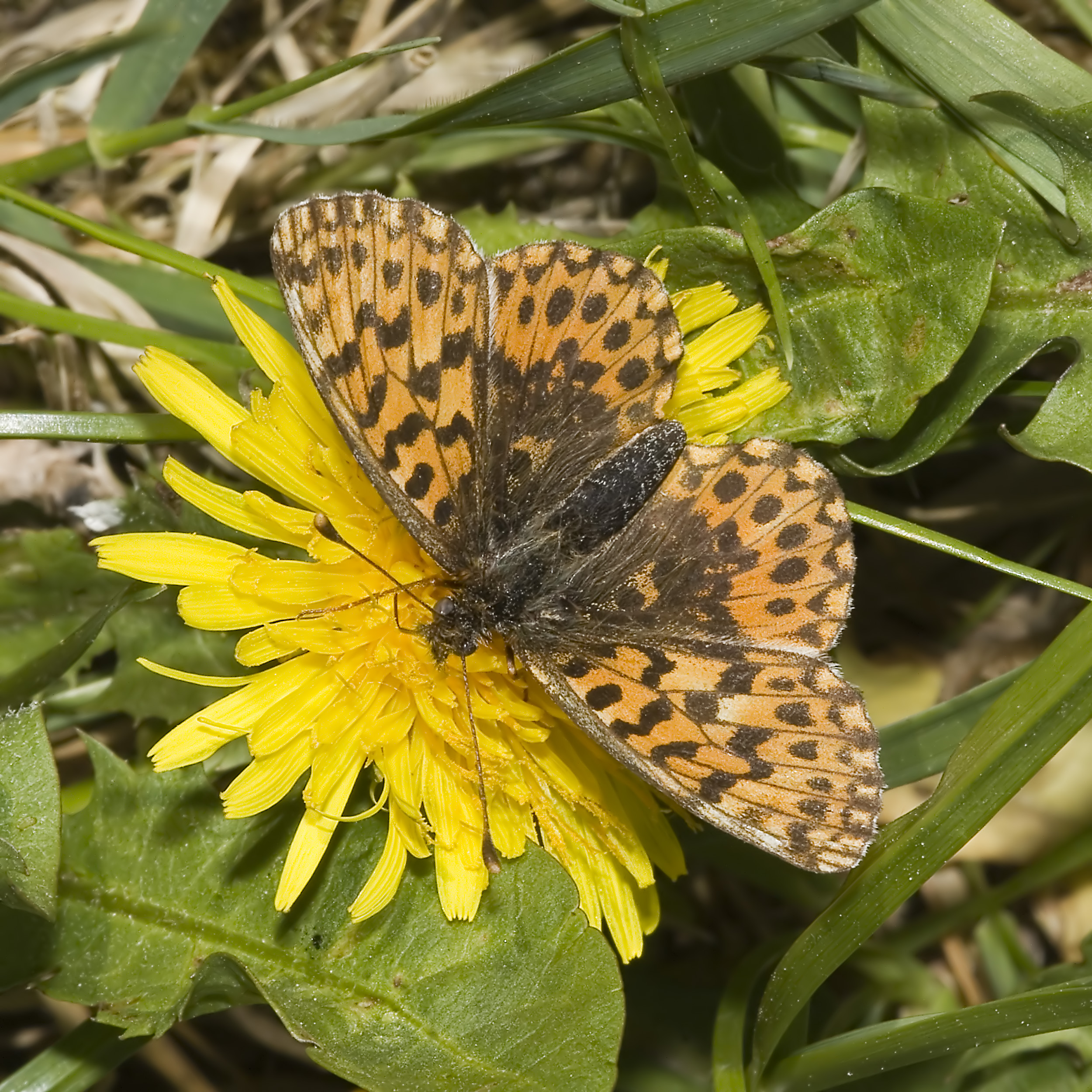
- Weaver's fritillary, Boloria dia

Scientific classification
- Domain: Eukaryota
- Kingdom: Animalia
- Phylum: Arthropoda
- Class: Insecta
- Order: Lepidoptera
- Family: Nymphalidae
- Tribe: Argynnini
- Genus: Boloria; Moore, 1900

Species
- Several, see text

Synonyms
- Boloria "Moore, 1900"; Clossiana Reuss, 1920 (but see text); Proclossiana Reuss, 1926; Smoljana Slivov, 1995

= Boloria =

Genus of brush-footed butterflies

Boloria is a brush-footed butterfly (Nymphalidae) genus. Clossiana is usually included with it nowadays, though some authors still consider it distinct and it seems to warrant recognition as a subgenus at least.

== Species ==
Listed alphabetically:

- Boloria acrocnema Gall & Sperling, 1980 – Uncompahgre fritillary
- Boloria alaskensis (Holland, 1900) – mountain fritillary (Arctic America, Alaska to Hudson Bay, Wyoming, Polar Urals, Yamal Peninsula, Transbaikalia, Chukotka, Wrangel Island)
- Boloria aquilonaris (Stichel, 1908) – cranberry fritillary
- Boloria alberta (W.H. Edwards, 1890) – Alberta fritillary
- Boloria angarensis (Erschoff, 1870) (Transbaikalia, South Siberia, Far East Yakutia, Polar Urals, Yamal Peninsula, Sayan, Tuva mountains, Amur, Ussuri, North Korea, Northeast China)
- Boloria astarte (Doubleday, [1847]) – Astarte fritillary
- Boloria bellona (Fabricius, 1775) – meadow fritillary
- Boloria caucasica (Lederer, 1852) (Caucasus, Transcaucasia, Turkey)
- Boloria chariclea (Schneider, 1794) – Arctic fritillary or purplish fritillary
- Boloria dia (Linnaeus, 1767) – Weaver's fritillary or violet fritillary
- Boloria distincta (Gibson, 1920) (Yukon to British Columbia, Polar Urals, Transbaikalia, Yakutia, Chukotka)
- Boloria elatus (Staudinger, 1892) (Transbaikalia)
- Boloria epithore (Edwards, [1864]) – Pacific fritillary
- Boloria erda (Christoph, 1893) (Yakutia, Sayan, Transbaikalia, Magadan)
- Boloria erubescens (Staudinger, 1901) (Tian-Shan, Ghissar-Darvaz, Pamirs-Alai)
- Boloria eunomia (Esper, [1800]) – bog fritillary, ocellate bog fritillary
- Boloria euphrosyne (Linnaeus, 1758) – pearl-bordered fritillary
- Boloria freija (Thunberg, 1791) – Freya's fritillary, Freija fritillary or zigzag fritillary
- Boloria frigga (Thunberg, 1791) – Frigga fritillary, willow bog fritillary
- Boloria frigidalis Warren, 1944 (Altai, Sayan, Tuva mountains, Mongolia)
- Boloria improba (Butler, 1877) – dingy fritillary
- Boloria iphigenia (Graeser, 1888) (Japan, east Amur, Ussuri and northeast China)
- Boloria gong (Oberthür, 1884) (Tibet, West China, North China)
- Boloria graeca (Staudinger, 1870) – Balkan fritillary
- Boloria jerdoni (Lang, 1868) – Jerdon's silverspot
- Boloria kriemhild (Butler, 1877) – relict fritillary (Montana, Wyoming)
- Boloria matveevi Gorbunov & Korshunov, 1995 (Altai)
- Boloria napaea (Hoffmannsegg, 1804) – napaea fritillary or mountain fritillary
- Boloria natazhati (Gibson, 1920) – cryptic fritillary or Beringian fritillary
- Boloria neopales (Nakahara, 1926) (Sakhalin)
- Boloria oscarus (Eversmann, 1844) (Siberia, Amur, Ussuri, Sakhalin, Yakutia)
- Boloria pales (Denis & Schiffermüller, 1775) – Shepherd's fritillary
- Boloria perryi (Butler, 1882) (southern Ussuri, North Korea, Amur)
- Boloria polaris (Boisduval, [1828]) – Polaris fritillary
- Boloria purpurea Churkin, 1999 (Barguzin Mountains in Buryatia)
- Boloria selene (Denis & Schiffermüller, 1775) – small pearl-bordered fritillary or silver-bordered fritillary
- Boloria selenis (Eversmann, 1837)
- Boloria sipora (Moore, [1875]) (Pamirs to Alai, Tian-Shan, West Himalaya)
- Boloria thore (Hübner, [1803]) – Thor's fritillary
- Boloria titania (Esper, 1793) – Titania's fritillary or purple bog fritillary
- Boloria tritonia (Böber, 1812) (Baikal, Amur, Ussuri)

== Brachiopod ==
Grunt described a brachiopod genus in 1973 under the same name. Since each code of biological nomenclature allows only for one genus with the same name, the brachiopod genus is in need of renaming.
