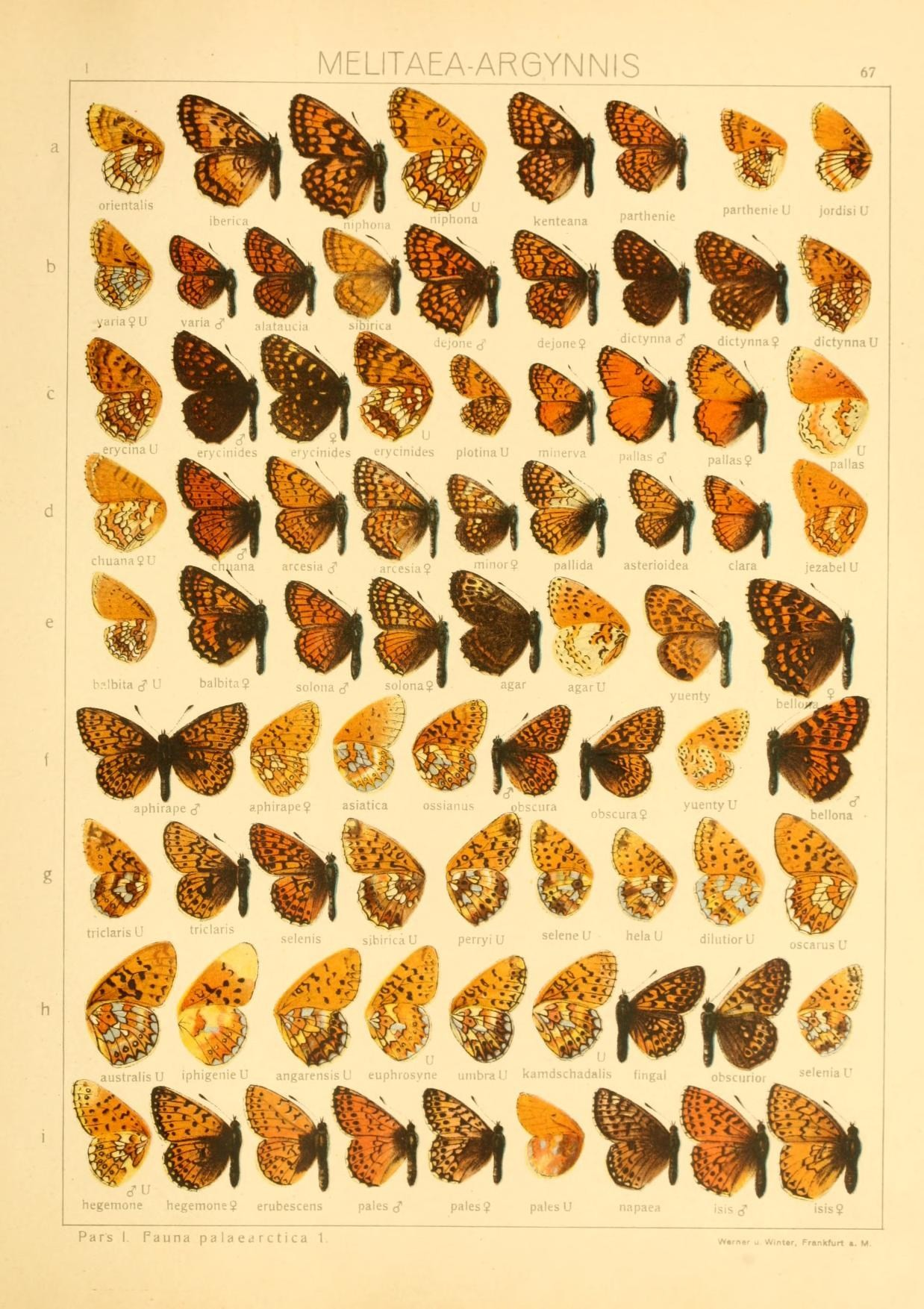
- Boloria oscarus in Seitz 67g, h (australis )

Scientific classification
- Domain: Eukaryota
- Kingdom: Animalia
- Phylum: Arthropoda
- Class: Insecta
- Order: Lepidoptera
- Family: Nymphalidae
- Genus: Boloria
- Species: B. oscarus

Binomial name
- Boloria oscarus (Eversmann, 1844)

= Boloria oscarus =

Species of butterfly

Boloria oscarus is a small butterfly found in the East Palearctic that belongs to the browns family.

== Subspecies ==
- C. o. oscarus South Siberia, East Amur
- C. o. australis (Graeser, 1888) South Amur, Ussuri, Sakhalin
- C. o. oscaroides (Ménétriés, 1859) East Yakutia

== Description from Seitz ==
A. oscarus Ev. (67g). This rather large species differs above but little from its nearest allies, but is distinguished beneath by the median band being very regular and the silvery gloss entirely absent. The median band is wax-yellow throughout, and the marginal spots, which also are silvery in allied species, are white with a feeble silky gloss. In eastern North Asia, from the Altai and Sajan to the Amur. — australis Graes. (= oscarus major Graes. i. I., maxima Fixs.) (67h) is the large southern form from the Ussuri and Corea; the upperside is of a pure and brighter colour, the black markings being more prominent. The spots of the forewing beneath are also more intense, while the colours of the hindwing beneath contrast somewhat less, the markings being less sharply defined than in oscarus. — The species flies in swampy meadows and in places with brooks, being plentiful in some localities, in May and June.

== Biology ==
The larva feeds on Viola spp.

== See also ==
- List of butterflies of Europe
