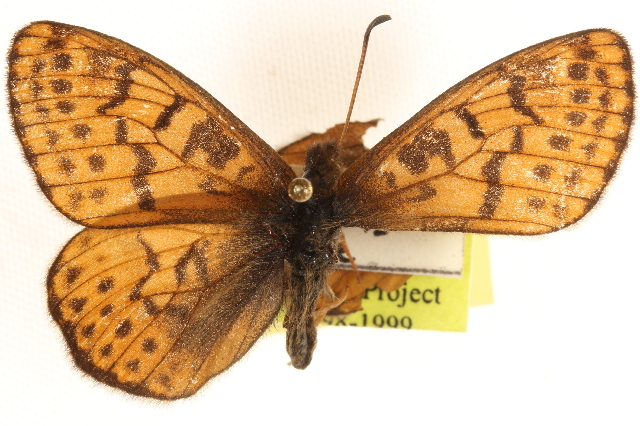

Conservation status
- Vulnerable (NatureServe)

Scientific classification
- Kingdom: Animalia
- Phylum: Arthropoda
- Class: Insecta
- Order: Lepidoptera
- Family: Nymphalidae
- Genus: Boloria
- Species: B. alberta

Binomial name
- Boloria alberta (W.H. Edwards, 1890)

Synonyms
- Argynnis alberta Edwards, 1890; Brenthis alberta; Clossiana banffensis (Gunder, 1932); Clossiana alberta

= Boloria alberta =

Species of butterfly

Boloria alberta, the Alberta fritillary, is a butterfly of the family Nymphalidae. It is found in the North American Rocky Mountains of British Columbia and Alberta and in northern Montana.

== Wingspan and coloration ==
The wingspan is 35–45 mm (1.4–1.8 in). The butterfly flies from July to early August. Male Alberta fritillary are dull orange and females are pale orange and grey brown. Their markings are blurred.

== Feeding and habitats ==
The larvae feed on mountain avens (Dryas octopetala). Its habitats include alpine ridges, tundra, and windswept scree slopes.

== Subspecies ==
- Boloria alberta alberta (North America)
- Boloria alberta kurentzovi (Wyatt, 1961) (Chukotka)
