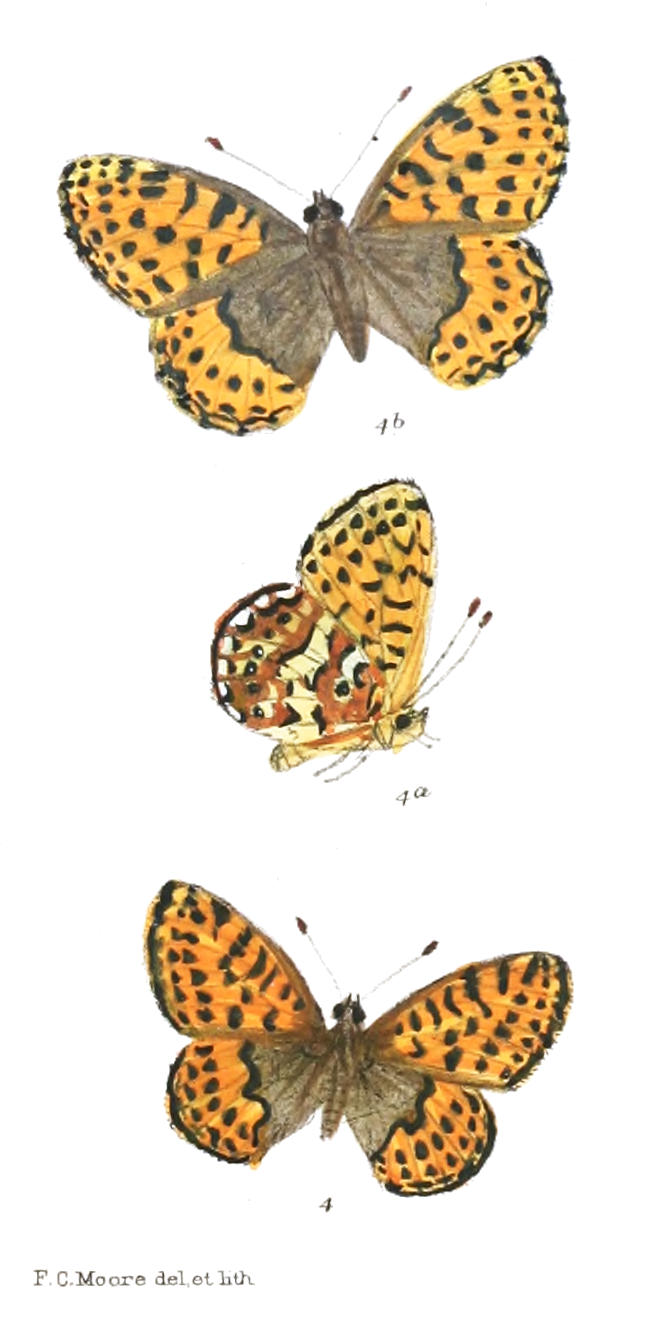

Scientific classification
- Domain: Eukaryota
- Kingdom: Animalia
- Phylum: Arthropoda
- Class: Insecta
- Order: Lepidoptera
- Family: Nymphalidae
- Genus: Boloria
- Species: B. jerdoni

Binomial name
- Boloria jerdoni (Lang, 1868)

Synonyms
- Argynnis jerdoni Lang, 1868; Clossiana jerdoni (Lang, 1868)

= Boloria jerdoni =

Jerdon's silverspot

Species of butterfly

Boloria jerdoni, the Jerdon's silverspot, is a butterfly of the family Nymphalidae. It is found in the western Himalayas and from Chitral to Kashmir.
