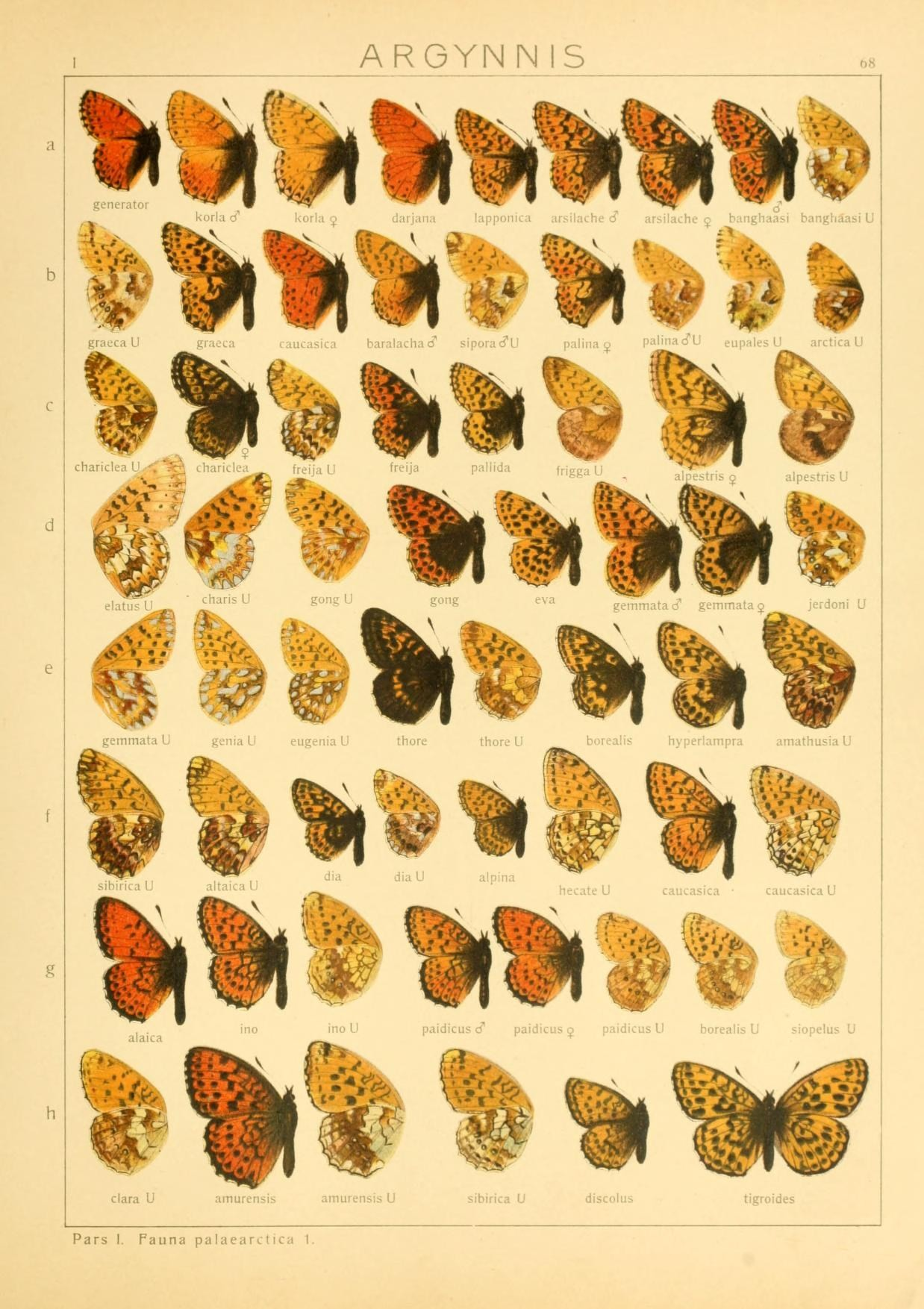
- Boloria caucasica in Seitz 68b

Scientific classification
- Kingdom: Animalia
- Phylum: Arthropoda
- Clade: Pancrustacea
- Class: Insecta
- Order: Lepidoptera
- Family: Nymphalidae
- Genus: Boloria
- Species: B. caucasica

Binomial name
- Boloria caucasica (Lederer, 1852)

= Boloria caucasica =

Species of butterfly

Boloria caucasica is a butterfly found in the East Palearctic (Caucasus, Transcaucasia, Turkey) that belongs to the browns family.

== See also ==
- List of butterflies of Russia
