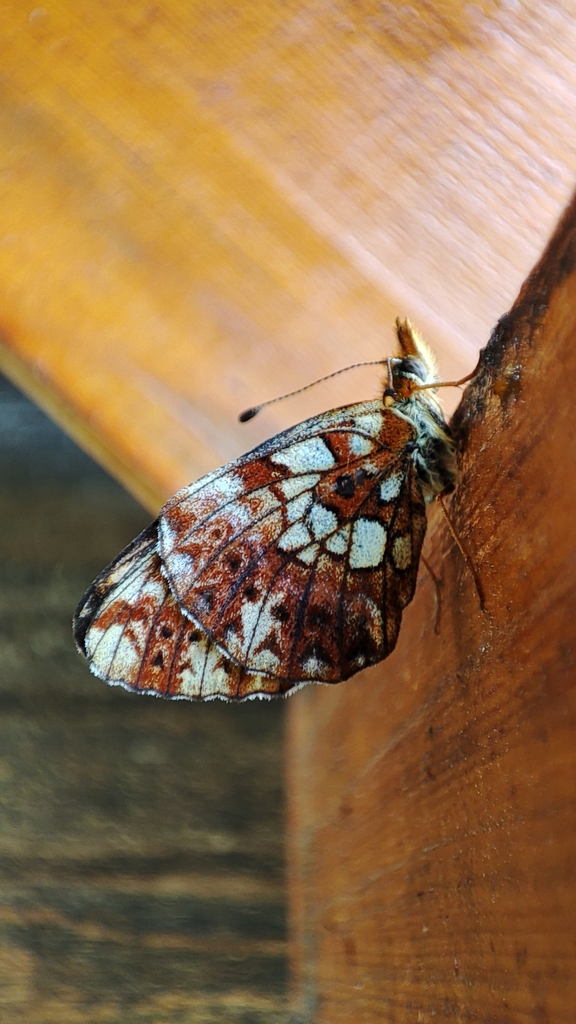

Scientific classification
- Domain: Eukaryota
- Kingdom: Animalia
- Phylum: Arthropoda
- Class: Insecta
- Order: Lepidoptera
- Family: Nymphalidae
- Genus: Boloria
- Species: B. selenis

Binomial name
- Boloria selenis (Eversmann, 1837)

Synonyms
- Argynnis selenis Eversmann, 1837; Clossiana selenis; Clossiana speranda Grosser, 1979; Argynnis selenis takamukuella Matsumura, 1929; Clossiana festiva (Krulikovsky, 1893); Argynnis selenis meinhardi Sheljuzhko, 1929; Clossiana perunovi Korb, 1999

= Boloria selenis =

Species of butterfly

Boloria selenis is a species of butterfly in the family Nymphalidae. It is found from the Volga basin to Japan.

== Description ==
The wingspan is 35–48 mm. Seitz A. selenis Ev. (67g). Above deeper brown than the preceding [hegemone], the black spots much larger than in hegemone, but not united to dentate bands as in aphirape. On the hindwing beneath the basal band consists of but 3 small pale spots which hardly touch each other; the median band is rather narrow and the pale spot placed in the same at the apex of the cell projects less distad and is less silvery than in the otherwise not dissimilar A. euphrosyne and selene. In typical specimens from the Ural Mts. the outer half of the hindwing beneath is scaled with yellow and brick-red, while in [subspecies] sibirica Ersch. (67g), from the mountains of Southern Siberia and Amurland, it is clouded with purplish violet. Widely distributed but very local, in June and much more plentiful again from August onward.

== Biology ==
Adults are on wing from June to August in one generation per year. In the Ussuri region there are two generations per year with adults on wing from May to June and from the end of July to September. The larvae feed on Viola species.

== Subspecies ==
- B. s. selenis (southern Urals, Volga valley)
- B. s. sibirica (Erschoff, 1870) (Siberia, Amur)
- B. s. samkoi (Sheljuzhko, 1931) (Polar Urals, Yamal Peninsula)
- B. s. kononovi (Kurentzov, 1970) (north-eastern Siberia)
- B. s. chosensis (Matsumura, 1925) (Ussuri)
- B. s. onorensis (Matsumura, 1925) (Sakhalin)
