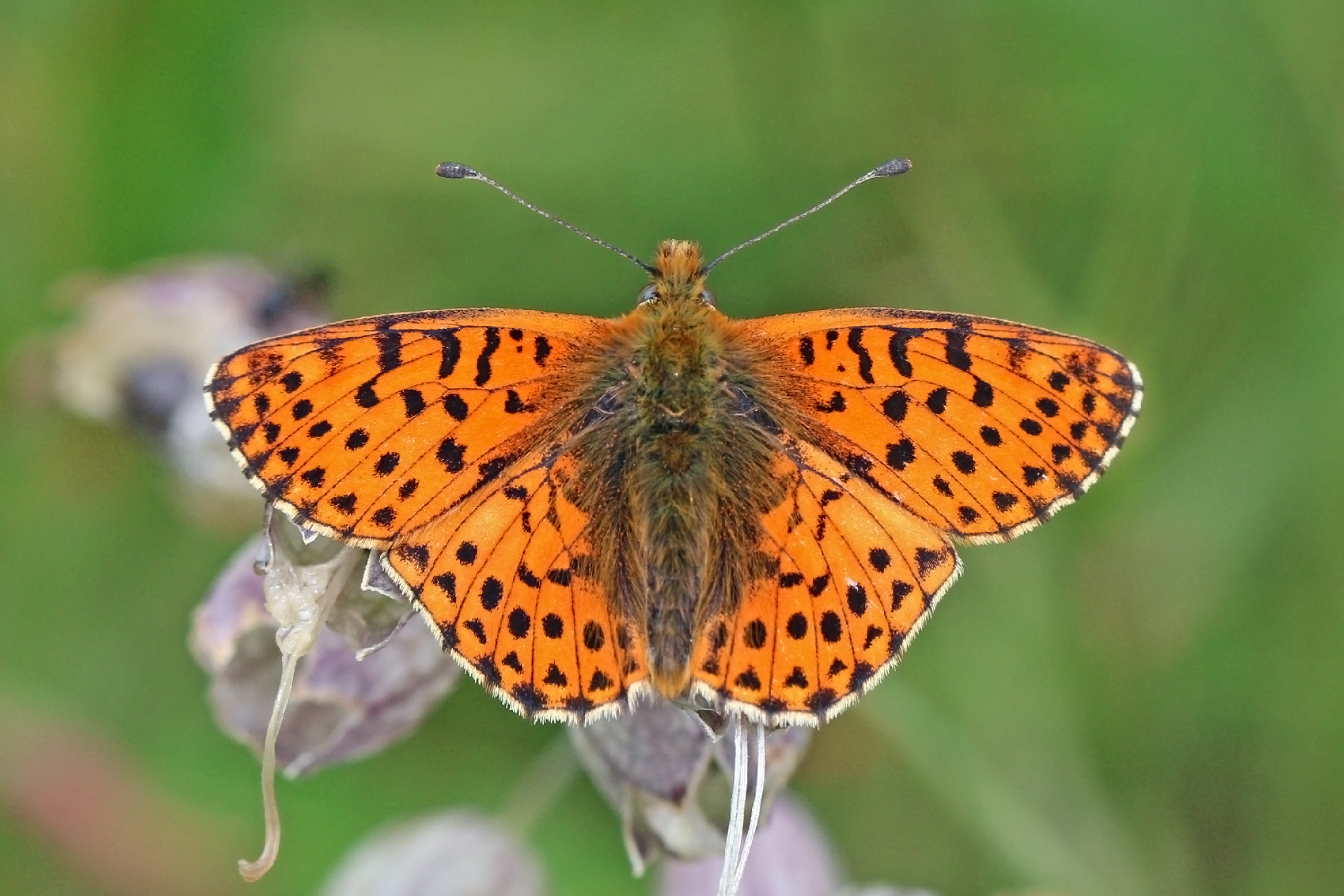

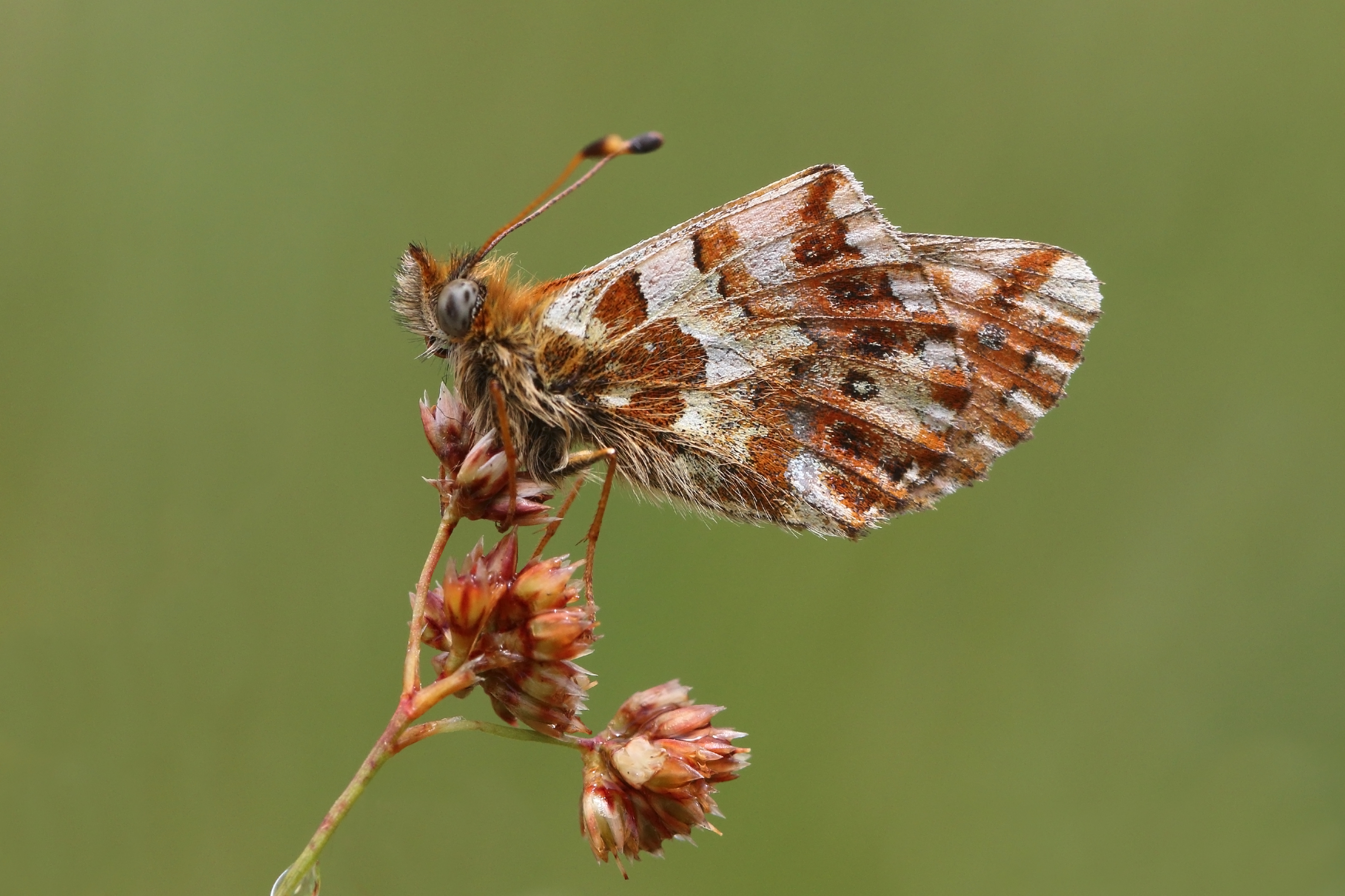
- both at Yastrebets, Rila Mountains, Bulgaria

Scientific classification
- Kingdom: Animalia
- Phylum: Arthropoda
- Clade: Pancrustacea
- Class: Insecta
- Order: Lepidoptera
- Family: Nymphalidae
- Genus: Boloria
- Species: B. graeca

Binomial name
- Boloria graeca (Staudinger, 1870)

Synonyms
- Boloria (Boloria) graeca

= Balkan fritillary =

Species of butterfly

The Balkan fritillary (Boloria graeca) is a butterfly in the family Nymphalidae found in the southern Alps of Europe and the mid- to high-altitude Balkans. It inhabits grassy, flower-rich areas, often near the tree line. The larva feeds on Viola species.

== Description ==
The orange upperside of the wings has a brown basal suffusion adorned with various marks of brown color, submarginal round spots and lines forming festoons. The hindwing forms an angle at its anterior edge. The underside of the forewings is identical, that of the hindwings presents silver designs, a line of small circles and greenish marbling in the female.

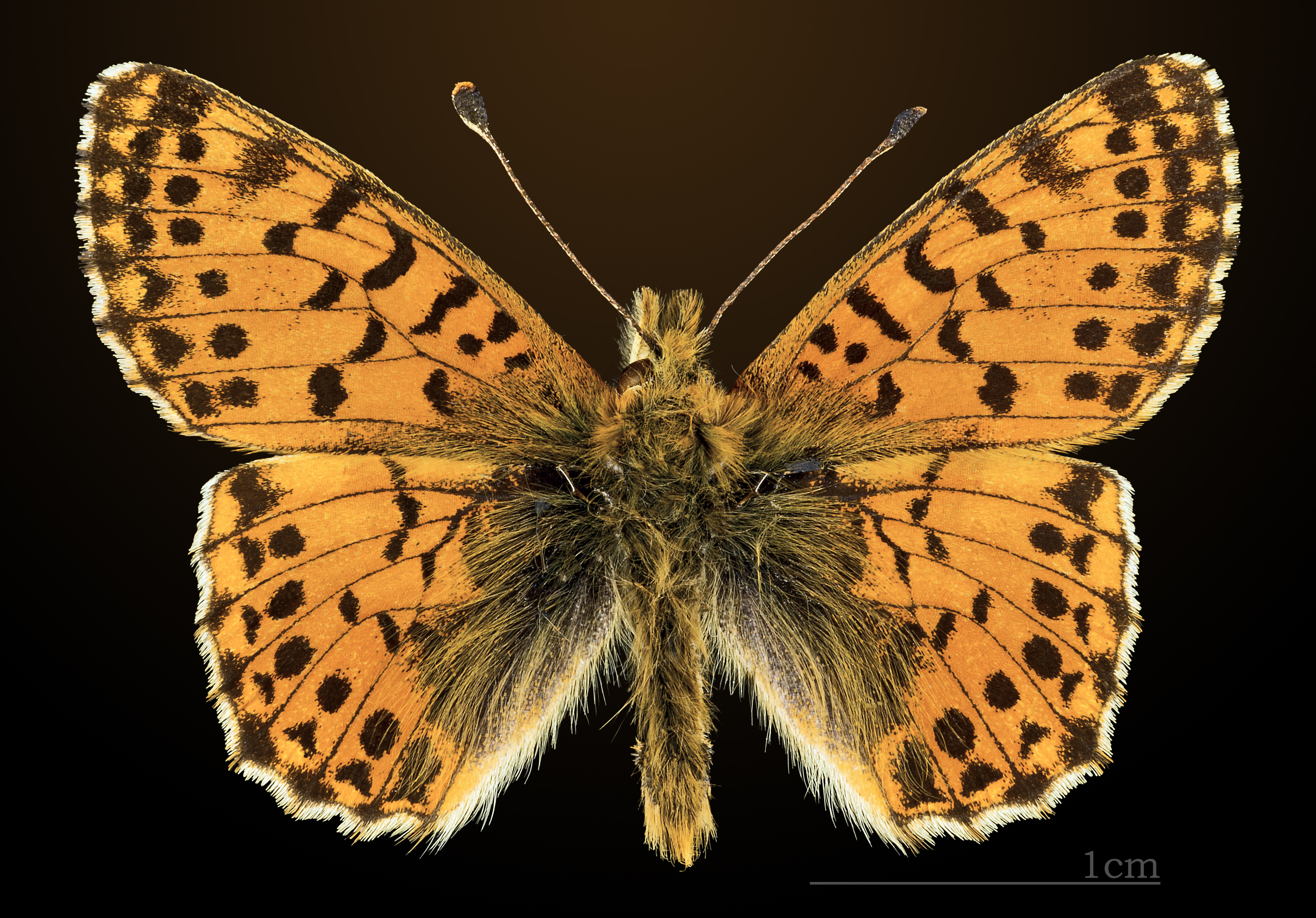
mounted specimen, dorsal side, France

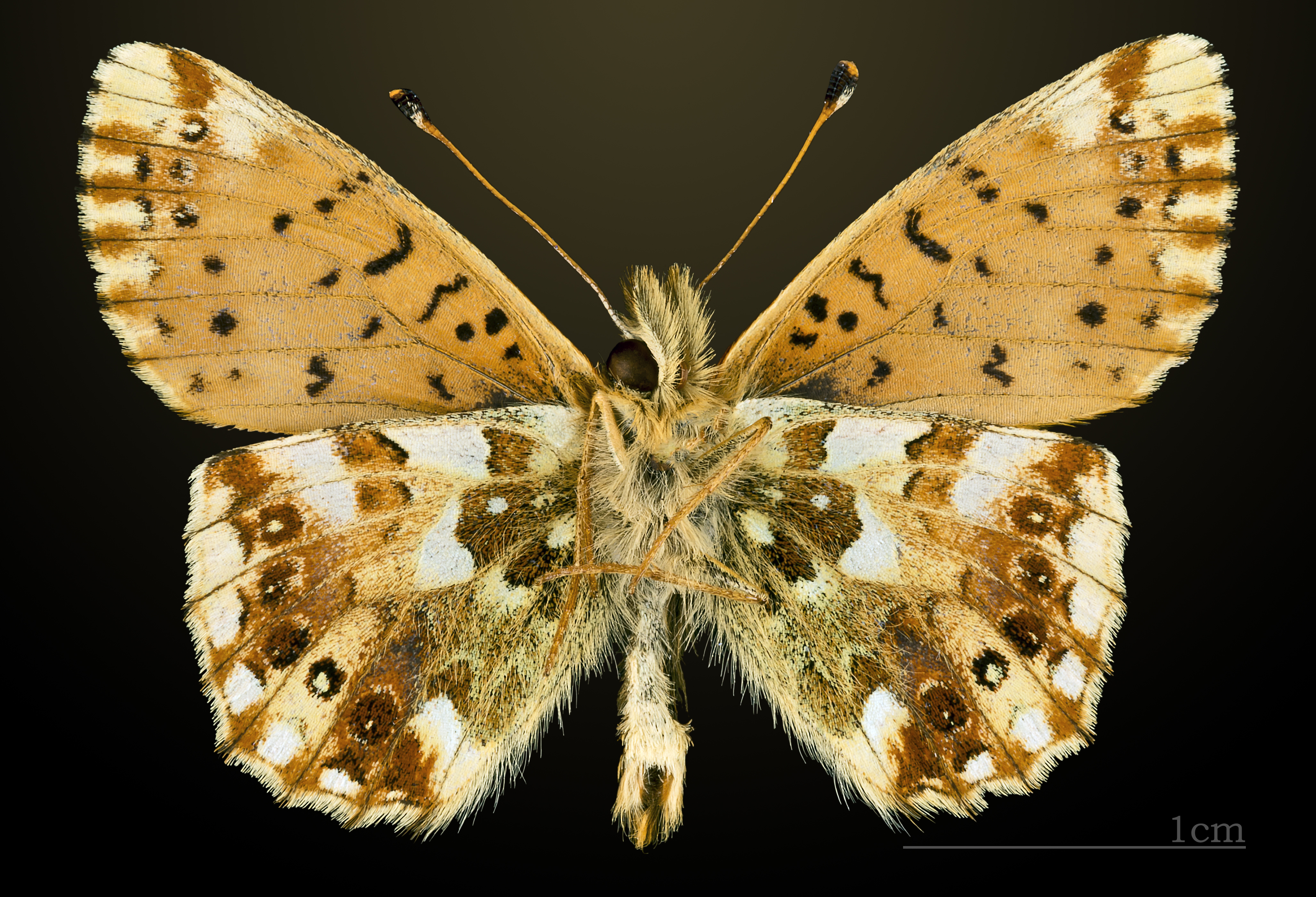
mounted specimen, ventral side, France

== Taxonomy ==
The species now called Bolaria graeca was described by German entomologist Otta Staudinger in 1870 as a subspecies under the basionym Argynnis pales var. graeca.
