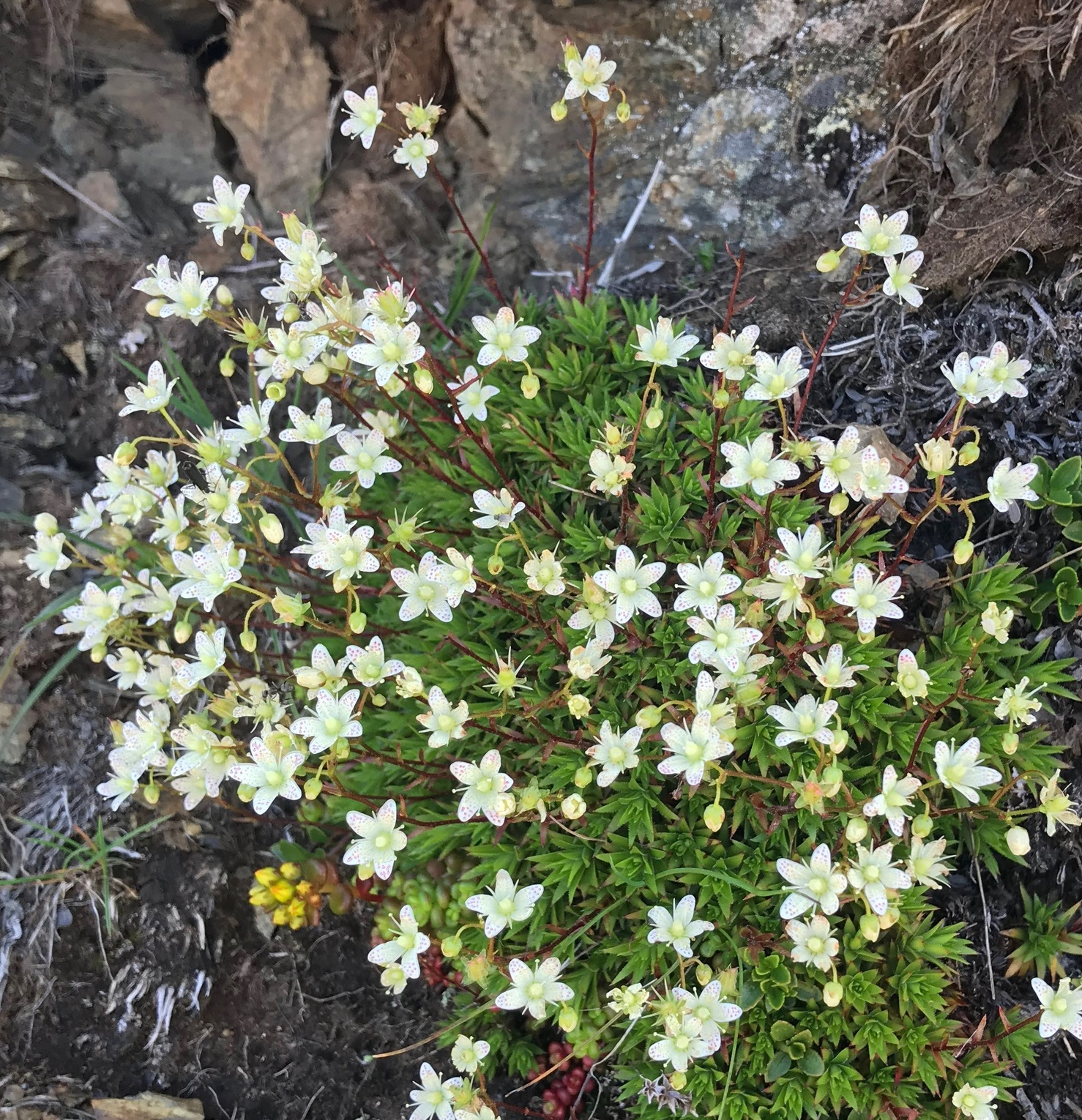

Scientific classification
- Kingdom: Plantae
- Clade: Tracheophytes
- Clade: Angiosperms
- Clade: Eudicots
- Order: Saxifragales
- Family: Saxifragaceae
- Genus: Saxifraga
- Species: S. bronchialis

Binomial name
- Saxifraga bronchialis L.

= Saxifraga bronchialis =

Species of plant

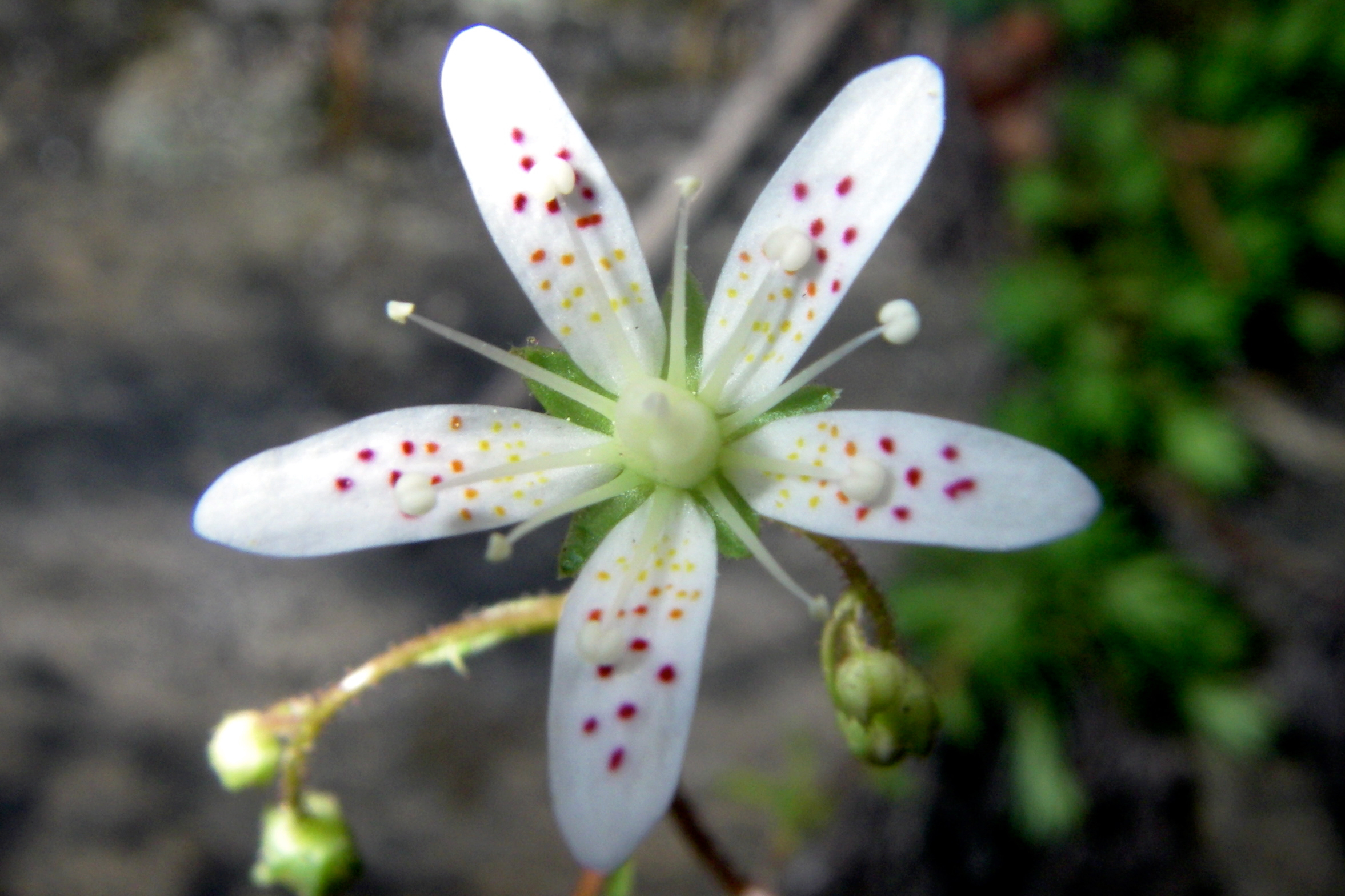
Close-up of a single flower of Saxifraga bronchialis in Rocky Mountain National Park, Colorado, USA.

Saxifraga bronchialis is a perennial herb in the family Saxifragaceae, with the common name matted saxifrage or spotted saxifrage. It is native to northern Asia and North America.

== Description ==
Matted saxifrage is a short perennial mat-forming plant. The mat consists of an extended cluster of leaf rosettes growing from a rhizome, each rosette consisting of densely overlapping lanceolate entire leathery leaves up to 1.5 cm long with prominent short stiff hairs on the margin and terminated by a spine-like tip about 1 mm long. Leaves are green, often with reddish tips and lower surfaces. The green to red floral stem is up to 20 cm tall and is sparsely covered with similar but smaller leaves, terminating in a branched cluster of 2 to 15 flowers (usually 3 to 5), each with five white to yellowish-white oblong petals with small dark red to yellow spots. Each flower has several prominent long white stamens that radiate above the petals and a roughly cone-shaped white ovary in the center (superior). Though each flower is small, plants can form extended mats and often produce a showy profusion of flowers in season.

== Range ==
Matted saxifrage ranges from Russia to Alaska and northern and western Canada and the American Pacific Northwest. It is also found in high mountains in Wyoming, Colorado, and New Mexico.

== Habitat ==
Matted saxifrage grows in alpine and subalpine open areas on rocks and in rock cracks, in scree, and in rocky soils.

== Gallery ==
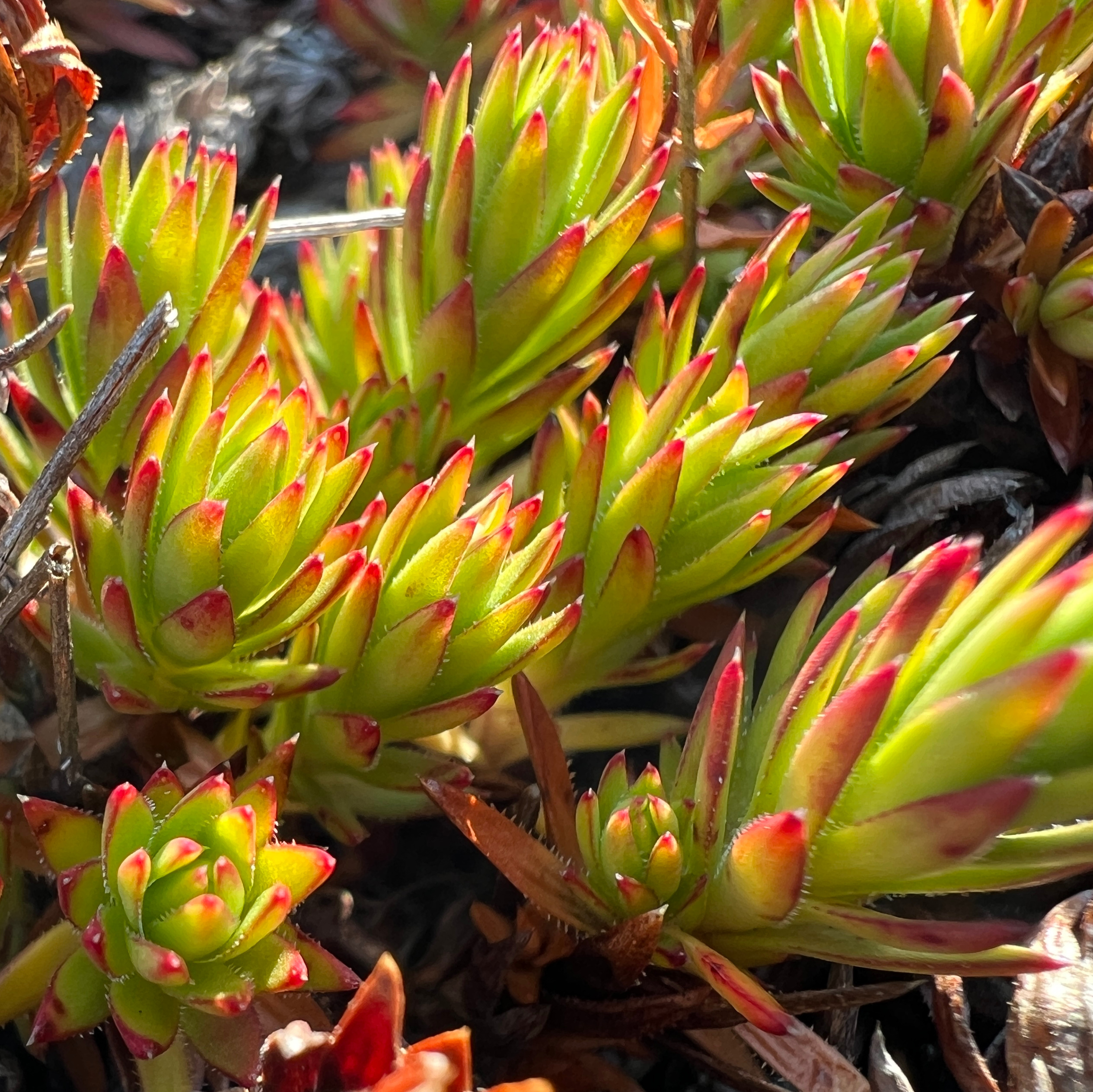
Close-up of rosette leaves
