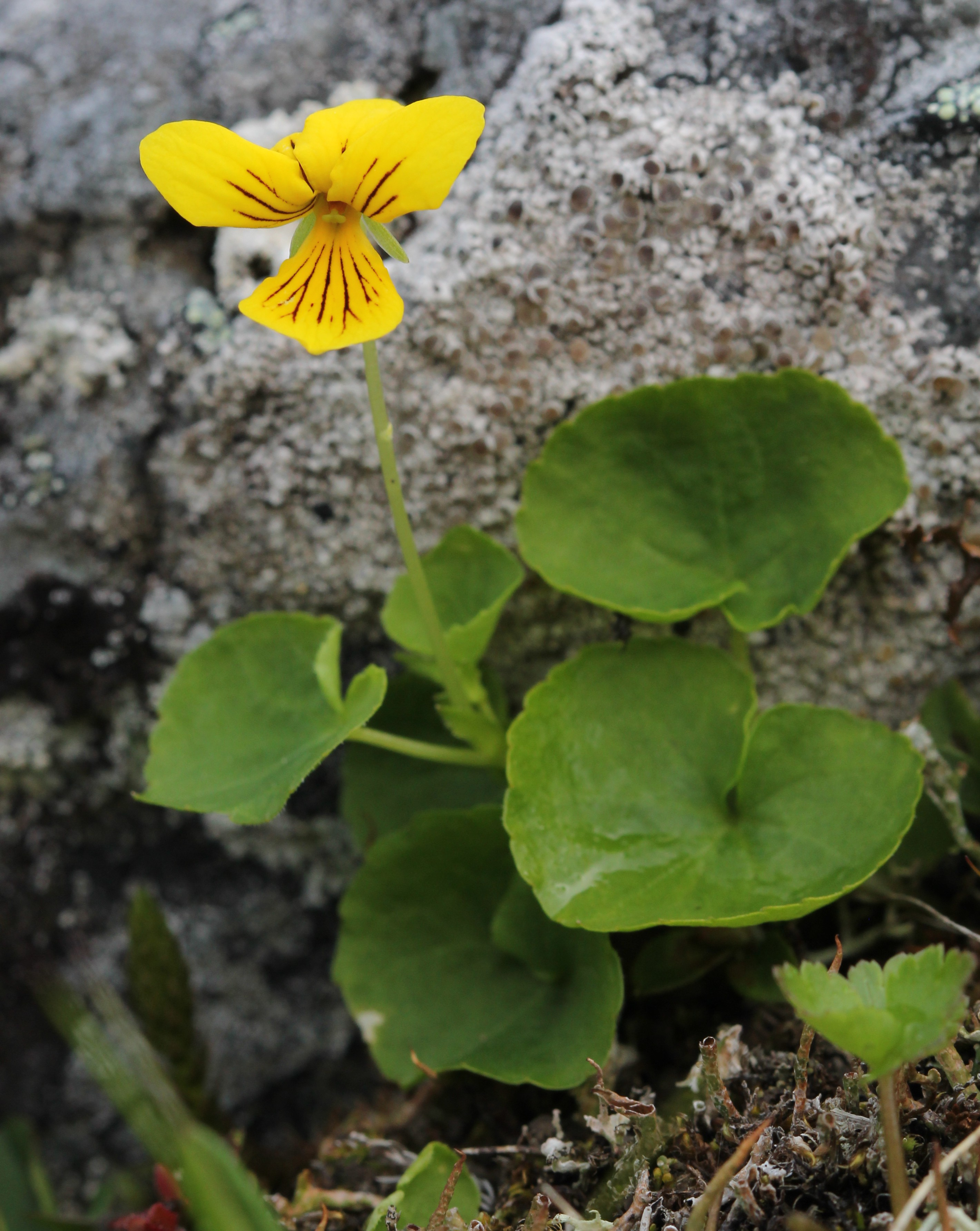

Conservation status
- Secure (NatureServe)

Scientific classification
- Kingdom: Plantae
- Clade: Tracheophytes
- Clade: Angiosperms
- Clade: Eudicots
- Clade: Rosids
- Order: Malpighiales
- Family: Violaceae
- Genus: Viola
- Species: V. biflora

Binomial name
- Viola biflora L.

= Viola biflora =

Species of flowering plant

Viola biflora is a species of the genus Viola. It is also called alpine yellow-violet, arctic yellow violet, or twoflower violet. It is found in Europe, Siberia, Central Asia, India, Pakistan, western and northern China, North Korea, Japan, and Western North America. The species is listed as Vulnerable in the Canadian province of British Columbia, Yukon Territory, and the US state of Colorado.

== Taxonomy ==
Viola biflora has the following recognized subtaxa according to World Flora Online including its autonym:

- Viola biflora L.
  - Viola biflora ssp. biflora
  - Viola biflora ssp. carlotte Calder & Roy L.Taylor
  - Viola biflora var. rockiana (W.Becker) Y.S. Chen

== Distribution ==
Viola biflora is typically found in shady, damp, sub-alpine to alpine areas. Some subtaxa have overlapping distribution:

- Viola biflora ssp. biflora: Europe, Asia, North America.
- Viola biflora ssp. carlotte: Endemic to Haida Gwaii in British Columbia.
- Viola biflora var. rockiana: Central China, including Qinghai and Tibet.
