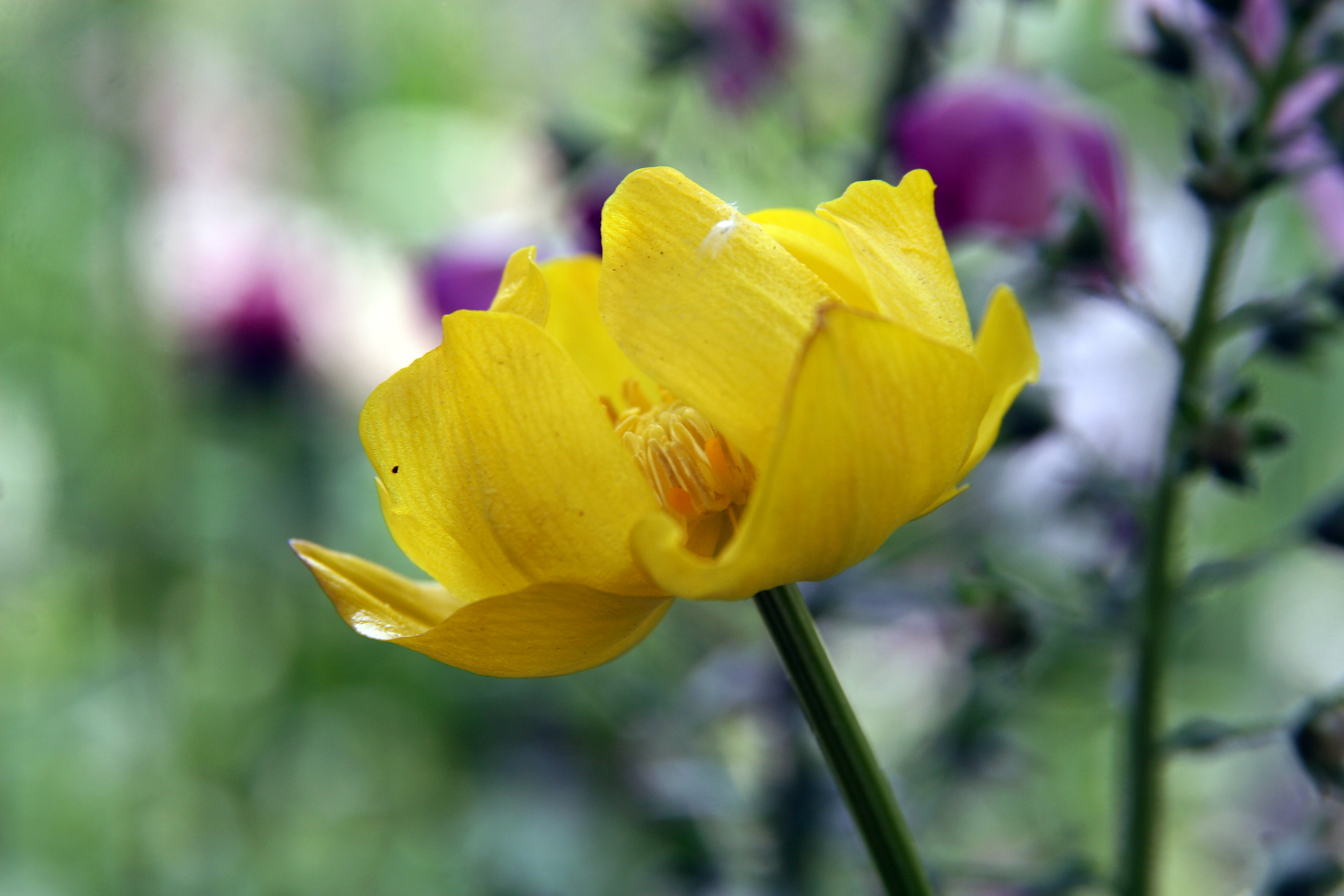
- 'Lemon Queen'

Scientific classification
- Kingdom: Plantae
- Clade: Tracheophytes
- Clade: Angiosperms
- Clade: Eudicots
- Order: Ranunculales
- Family: Ranunculaceae
- Genus: Trollius
- Species: T. × cultorum

Binomial name
- Trollius × cultorum Bergmans

= Trollius × cultorum =

Species of flowering plant

Trollius × cultorum is a group of hybrid flowering plants of garden origin, belonging to the buttercup family Ranunculaceae. There are several cultivars, derived from T. europaeus, T. asiaticus and T. chinensis. These are clump-forming herbaceous perennials whose preferred location is heavy, moist or even boggy ground, in full sun or partial shade. Typically growing to 60 cm (24 in) tall, they bear showy double flowers up to 6 cm (2.4 in) in diameter. Flowers appear in shades of cream, yellow and orange. The curved "petals" are actually sepals, surrounding the smaller, nectar-bearing petals. The spherical or cupped shape of the blooms gives rise to the common name globeflower, which they share with other Trollius species.

The Latin specific epithet cultorum means "relating to gardens, cultivation".

Trollius × cultorum is an unresolved name, meaning that it has not yet been accepted as a correct botanical name or synonym.

However, plants are widely offered in the horticultural trade. The cultivars 'Superbus' and 'Orange Princess' have gained the Royal Horticultural Society's Award of Garden Merit. Other cultivars include 'Alabaster', 'Lemon Queen' and 'New Moon'.
