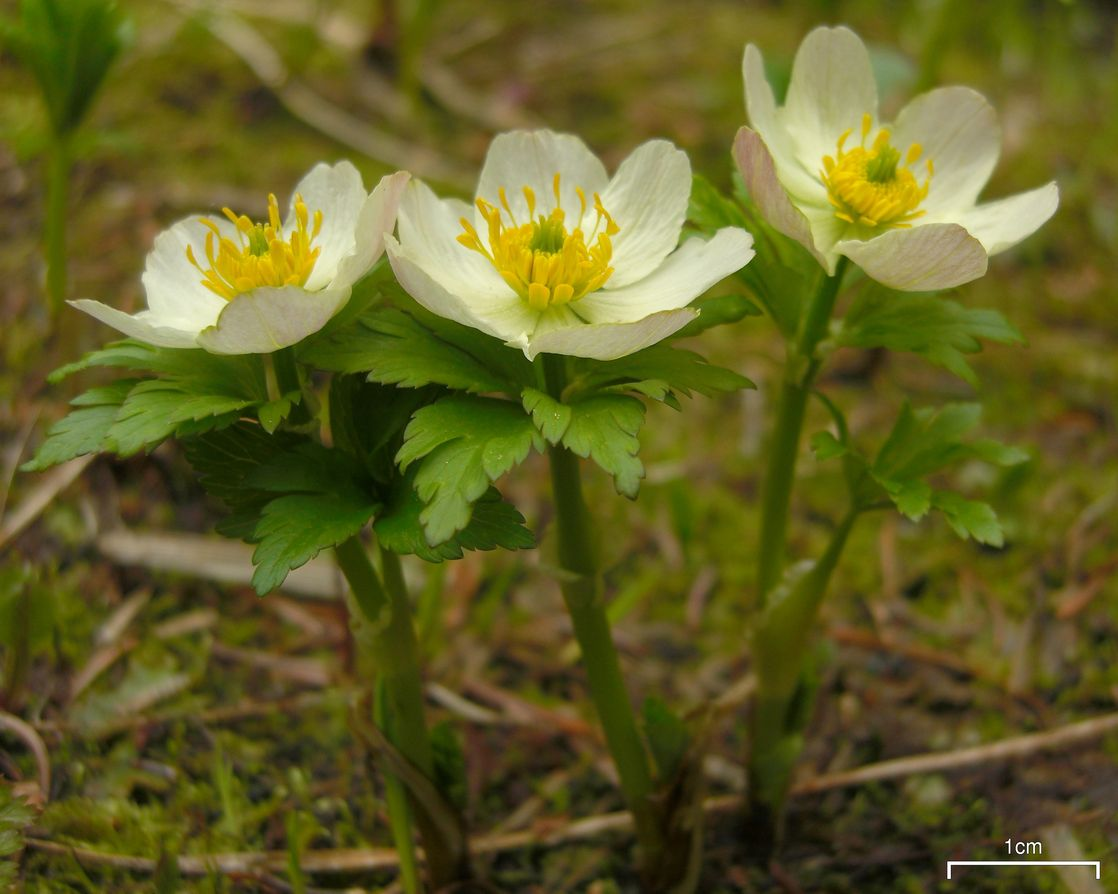

Scientific classification
- Kingdom: Plantae
- Clade: Embryophytes
- Clade: Tracheophytes
- Clade: Spermatophytes
- Clade: Angiosperms
- Clade: Eudicots
- Order: Ranunculales
- Family: Ranunculaceae
- Genus: Trollius
- Species: T. albiflorus

Binomial name
- Trollius albiflorus (A.Gray) Rydb.

= Trollius albiflorus =

Species of flowering plant

Trollius albiflorus is a species of flowering plants in the family Ranunculaceae. It is commonly called the white globeflower.

Flowers of the white globeflower typically have five to six white petals and many bright yellow stamens in the center.

Trollius albiflorus is found in alpine habitats in North America up into Canada.
