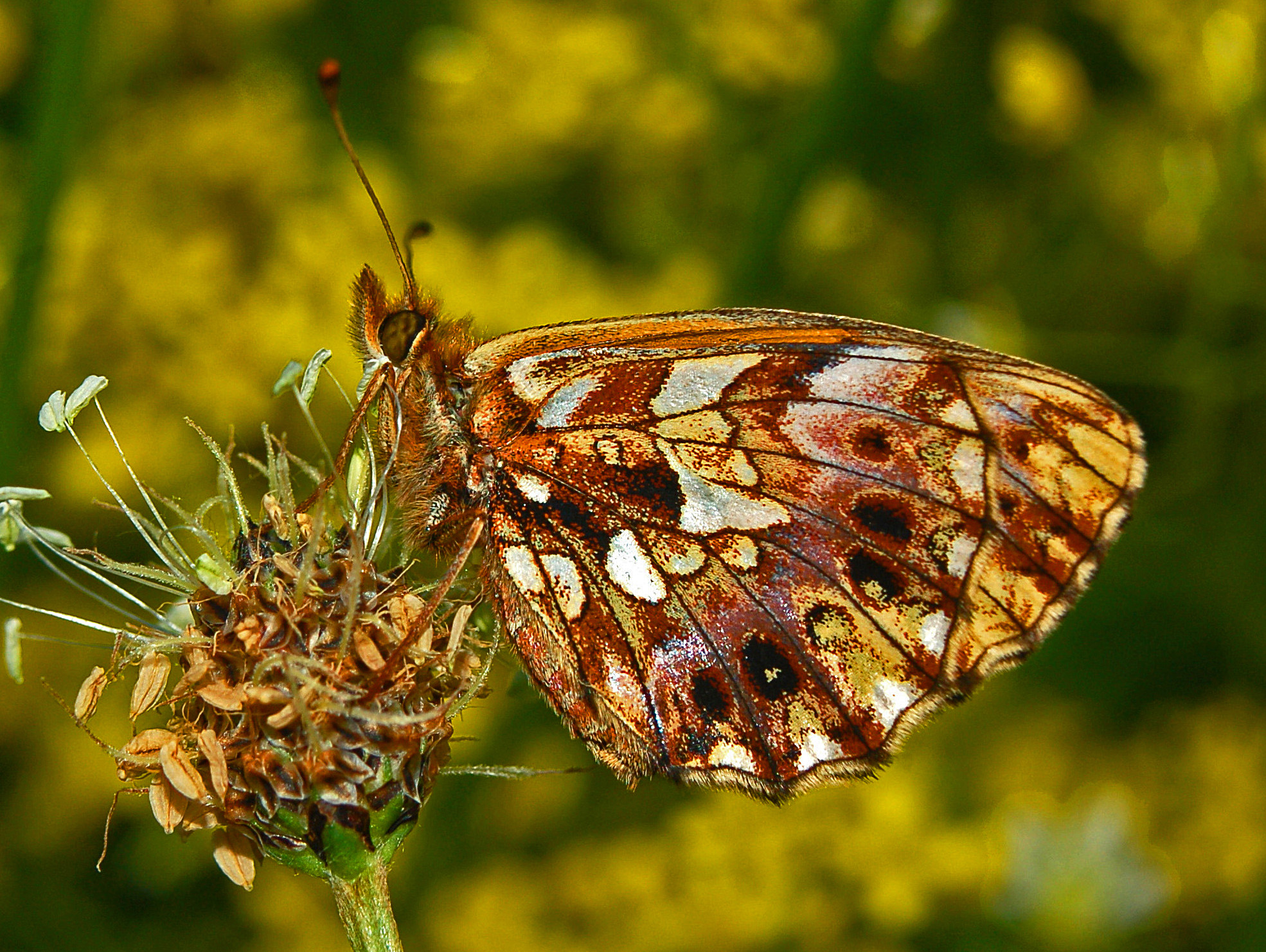
- Ventral view
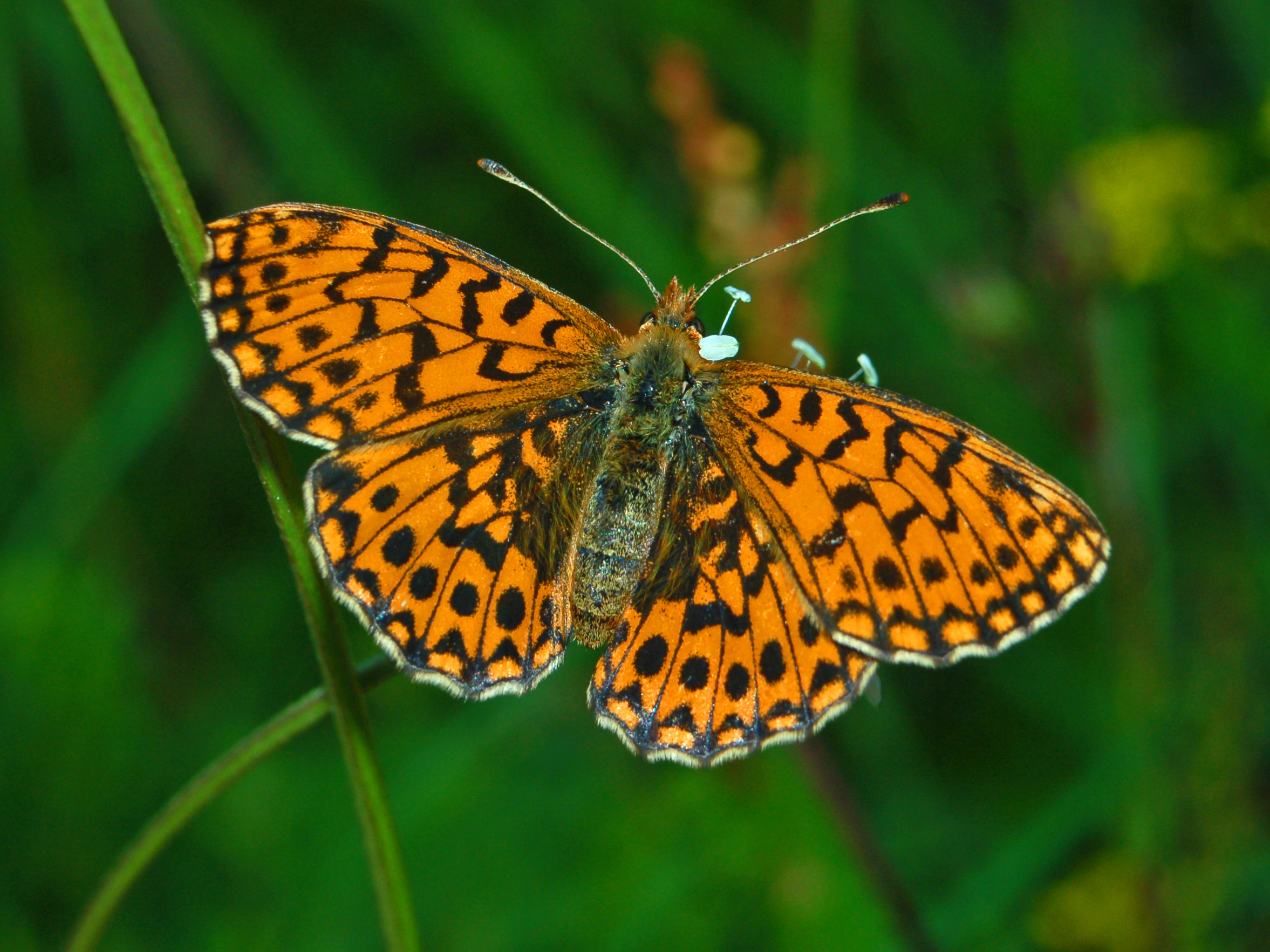
- Dorsal view

Scientific classification
- Kingdom: Animalia
- Phylum: Arthropoda
- Clade: Pancrustacea
- Class: Insecta
- Order: Lepidoptera
- Family: Nymphalidae
- Genus: Boloria
- Species: B. dia

Binomial name
- Boloria dia Linnaeus, 1767

Synonyms
- Clossiana dia; Boloria (Clossiana) dia

= Boloria dia =

Species of butterfly

Boloria dia, the Weaver's fritillary or violet fritillary, is a butterfly in the family Nymphalidae. The name Weaver's fritillary is in honor of Richard Weaver, an English insect collector who claimed to have obtained the specimen within ten miles of Birmingham around 1820. However, B. dia is very rare in England and the few specimens known from there are thought to be from possibly accidental introductions.

== Description ==
The adult is a small fritillary with typically chequered orange-brown upperside and a submarginal row of triangles and dots. The forewing is 16–17 mm long. The underside of the hindwing has a distinctive purplish band.

== Description in Seitz ==
A. dia L. (68f) is the smallest Argynnis. Above usually more extended black than the other species; the basal area of the hindwing as a rule quite dark, the marginal area with a row of heavy black dots. The hindwing beneath variegated with purple and bearing silvery spots at the margin, in the median band and at the base. Throughout Central, North and East Europe, also in Anterior Asia eastwards to Mongolia. Specimens with a broad confluent median band are ab. vittata Spul. (= mediofasciata Schultz). In ab. hudaki Aign., especially plentiful among the second brood, only the narrow median band of the hindwing is reddish yellow, the margin as well as the base being broadly black. — alpina Elw. [ now subspecies B. d. alpina] (Elwes, 1899] (68f) is the form from eastern Central Asia, described from the Altai; the ground-colour is duller, more leather-colour than reddish yellow. — Larva paler or darker grey, with a pale-edged blackish dorsal l ine and a reddish brown side-line; subdorsally there are small light spots in a blackish patch; the spines pale yellow with dark yellow base; in June and from September till April on Violaceae and Rubus, said to feed also on Prunella vulgaris. Pupa brown; on the back with rows of small pointed tubercles. The butterfly in April and May and again from August onward in open places and clearings of woods, flying low and frequently visiting flowers. One finds the sleeping butterfly commonly hanging on flowering heather at night, the underside being admirably adapted to its small flowers. The species does not appear to be rare wherever it occurs, nor ever to be found in large numbers.

== Similar species ==
B. dia differs from the pearl-bordered fritillary in having a sharp angle to its hindwing (readily seen from underside when perched with wings closed). The similar Titania's fritillary has a less sharply-angled hindwing and only occurs at high altitude.

In Europe the larvae feed on Viola species (Viola odorata, Viola hirta, Viola canina, Viola reichenbachiana, Viola tricolor), and outside Europe on Prunella vulgaris and Rubus idaeus.

== Distribution ==
Boloria dia is found in Europe, over the Caucasus east across the Palearctic to Mongolia. It is widespread and common across southern France. In Europe it occurs from northern Spain, Italy and Greece to Poland, the Balkans and Turkey. It is not found in Britain.

== Subspecies ==
- Clossiana dia dia western Europe
- Clossiana dia alpina (Elwes, 1899)
- Clossiana dia calida (Jachontov, 1911)
- Clossiana dia disconota (Krulikovsky, 1909) central Europe and western Siberia
- Clossiana dia semota Tuzov, 2000
- Clossiana dia setania (Fruhstorfer, 1909)

== Etymology ==
Named in the Classical tradition. Dia (Greek mythology) is the wife of Ixion, king of the Lapiths.

== Gallery ==
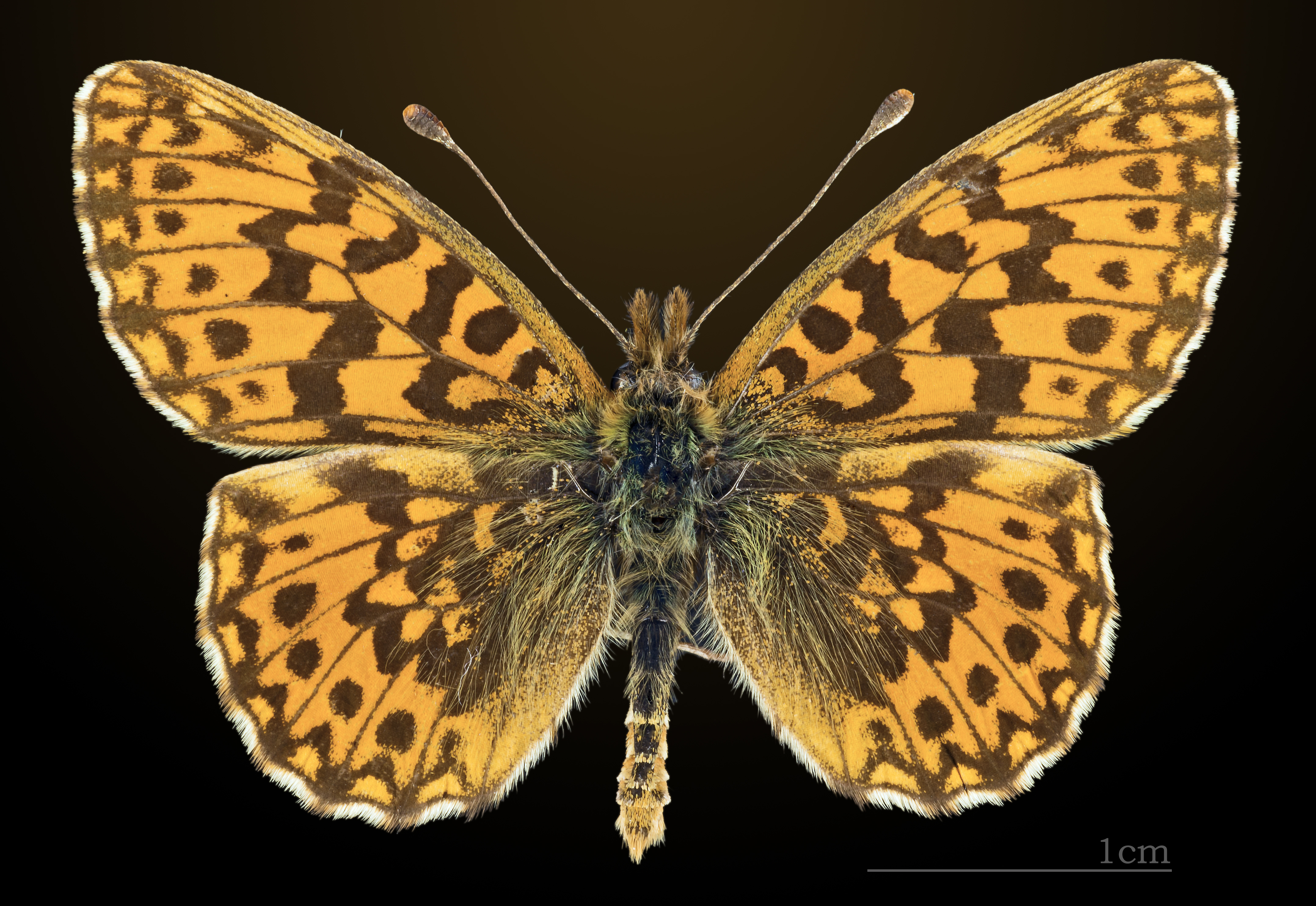
Dorsal side

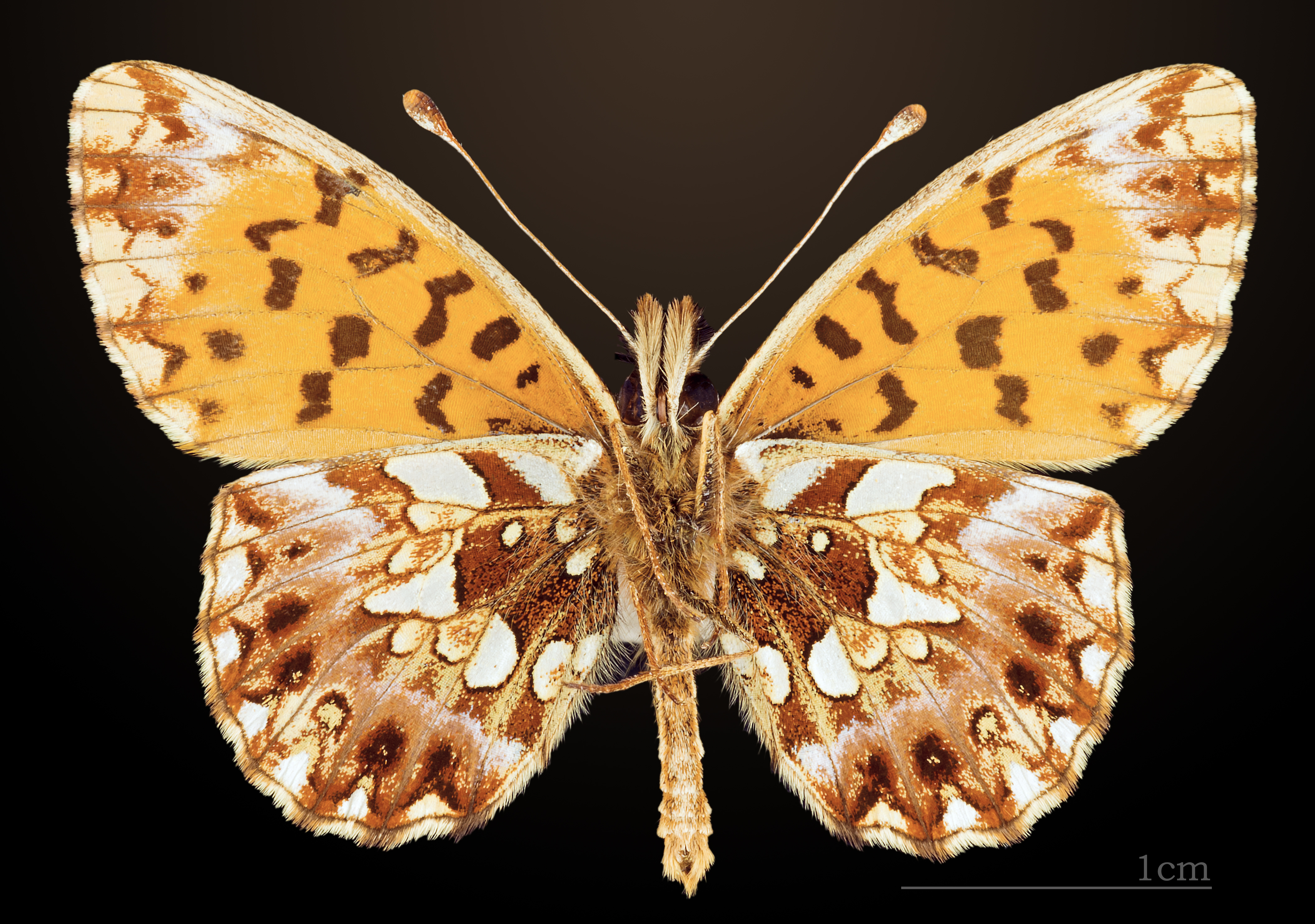
Ventral side
