= Richard Weaver =

Dick, Rick or Richard Weaver may refer to:

- Richard Weaver (MP) (1575–1642), English politician during Long Parliament
- Richard Weaver (entomologist) (1783–1857), English collector of butterflies and moths
- Richard Weaver (American politician) (1827–1906), English-born Wisconsin state legislator
- Richard M. Weaver (1910–1963), American intellectual historian and political philosopher
- Dick Weaver, American baseball player in 1944 Negro leagues
- Rick Weaver (1926–2000), American sports announcer for Miami Dolphins
- Richard C. Weaver, American known since 1990s as "Handshake Man" of Presidents
