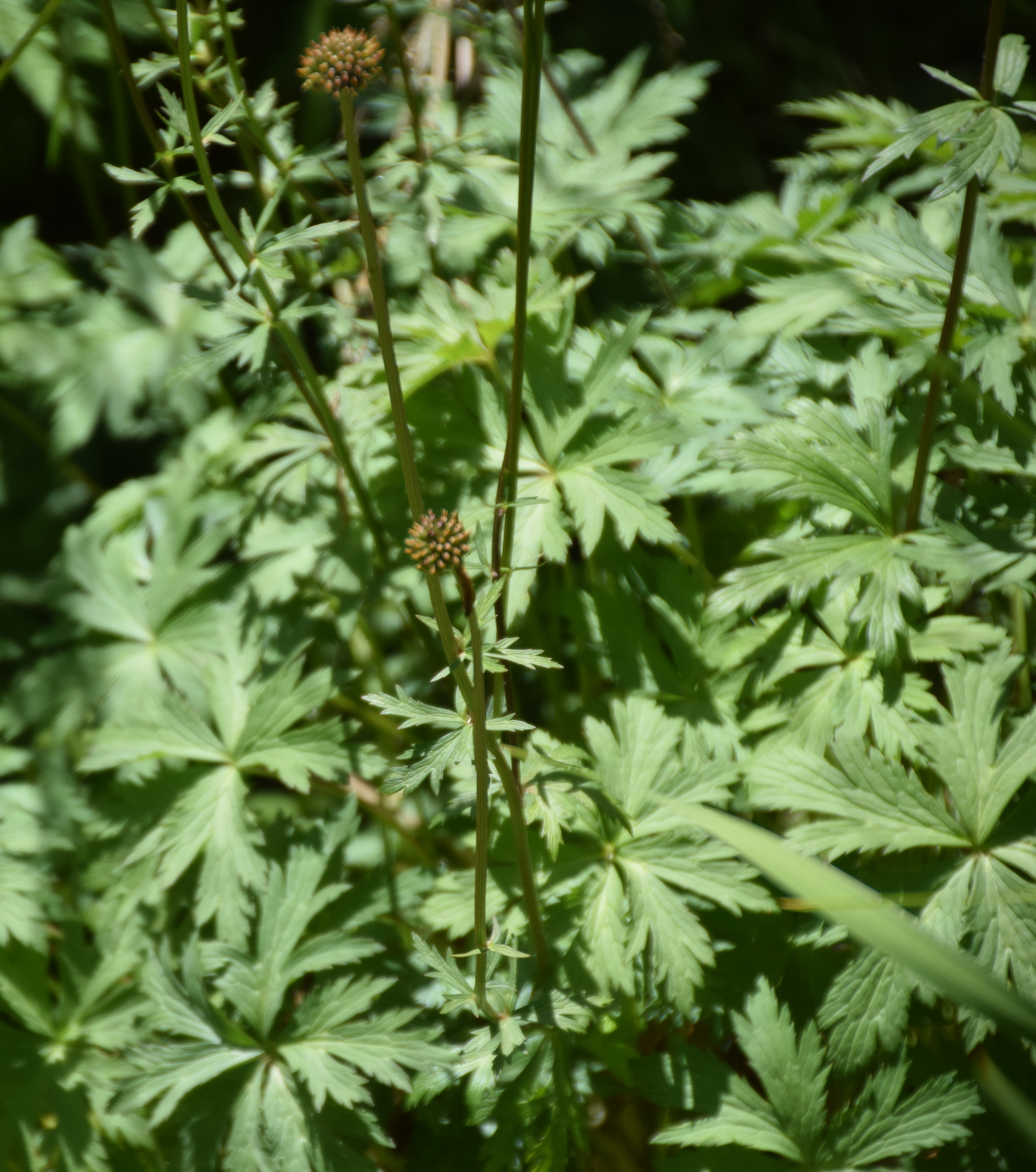
- In fruit

Scientific classification
- Kingdom: Plantae
- Clade: Tracheophytes
- Clade: Angiosperms
- Clade: Eudicots
- Order: Ranunculales
- Family: Ranunculaceae
- Genus: Trollius
- Species: T. yunnanensis

Binomial name
- Trollius yunnanensis (Franch.) Ulbr.

Synonyms
- Tollius pumilus var. yunnanensis Franch.; Trollius papavereus Schipcz.; Trollius saniculifolius H.Lév.

= Trollius yunnanensis =

Species of flowering plant

Trollius yunnanensis, the Yunnan globeflower (Chinese: 云南金莲花), is a species of globeflower, native to southern China; Gansu, Sichuan and Yunnan provinces, and to northern Myanmar. A perennial, it prefers to grow at elevations from 1,900 m up to 3,900 m on grassy slopes and wet meadows. It has gained the Royal Horticultural Society's Award of Garden Merit.

== Description ==
Trollius yunnanensis plants grow at least 20 cm tall, and can reach 80 cm when fruiting. Stems are usually simple and if they branch, they tend to do so above their mid height. They possess two or three trilobate-reniform basal leaves, with 7 to 20 cm petioles with bases narrowly sheathed bases. At first glance the upper leaves appear to be many smaller feathery leaves, but this is because they are deeply incised into multiple lobes and sub-lobes, themselves further incised. The upper leaf blades are roughly pentagonal, and measure 2.6 to 5.5 cm by 4.8 to 11 cm. They have deeply cordate bases. Each leaf is three-lobed. The central part or lobe is rhombic-ovate or rhombic, itself deeply incised into three sections (3-fid), which are incised-lobulate to dentate at their margins. The lateral lobes are obliquely flabellate, and divided into two unequal sections. Cauline leaves that are closer to the basal leaves resemble them more closely, whereas more distal cauline leaves have shorter petioles and may even be subsessile. Leaves higher up on the plant are smaller.

Flowers are usually solitary, but may have two or three flowers to a cyme. Typical flowers are 4 to 5.5 cm in diameter, smaller flowers may be only 3.2 cm. When in bloom, pedicels are about 4 cm long, and they grow to about 9.5 cm by the time of fruiting. Each flower has five (rarely six or seven) prominent yellow sepals which turn more or less green when dried. The sepals are broadly obovate or obovate, and rarely broadly elliptic, 1.7 to 2.5 (rarely 3) cm by 1.2 to 2.5 (rarely 2.8) cm, with rounded or truncate apices. The tiny subspatulate petals are linear, shorter than the stamens, 7 to 7.5 (rarely 17) mm long by about 1 mm, widening slightly at their apices. The numerous stamens are about 1 cm long.

Trollius yunnanensis flowers June through September and fruits September through October. Seeds are contained in about to 25 follicles which are 9 to 11 mm by about 3 mm and usually have a persistent 1 mm erect style. The smooth seeds are narrowly ovoid, about 1.5 mm in diameter.
