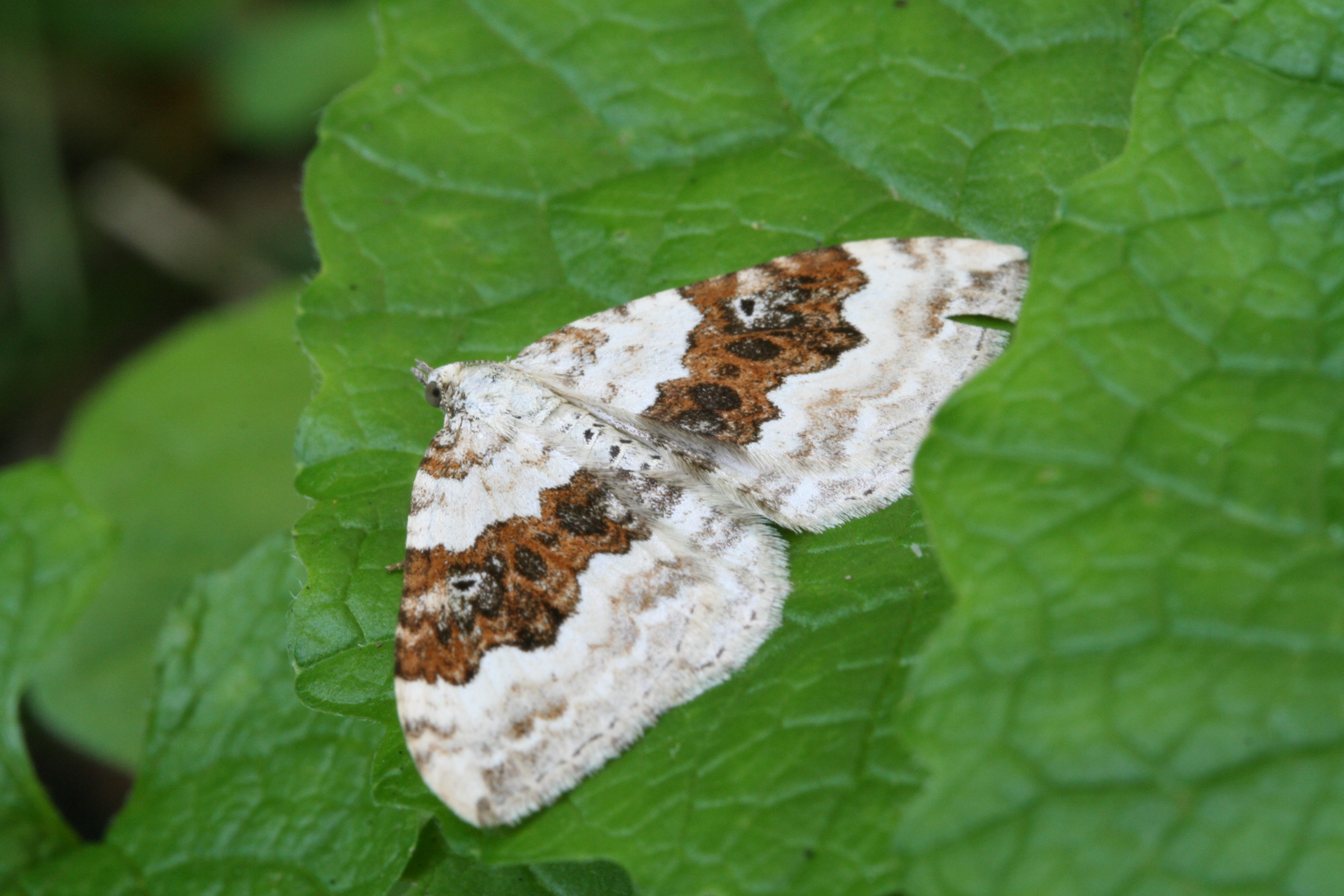

Scientific classification
- Kingdom: Animalia
- Phylum: Arthropoda
- Clade: Pancrustacea
- Class: Insecta
- Order: Lepidoptera
- Family: Geometridae
- Genus: Xanthorhoe
- Species: X. montanata

Binomial name
- Xanthorhoe montanata (Denis & Schiffermüller, 1775)

= Silver-ground carpet =

Species of moth

The silver-ground carpet (Xanthorhoe montanata) is a moth of the family Geometridae. The species was first described by Michael Denis and Ignaz Schiffermüller in 1775. It is common throughout the Palearctic region (from Ireland to the Russian Far East but not Japan) including the Near East and North Africa.It is found in a variety of different habitats and occurs, for example, in humid forests, moorland and shore areas, on embankments or on unimproved grass meadows and heathlands as well as in gardens.

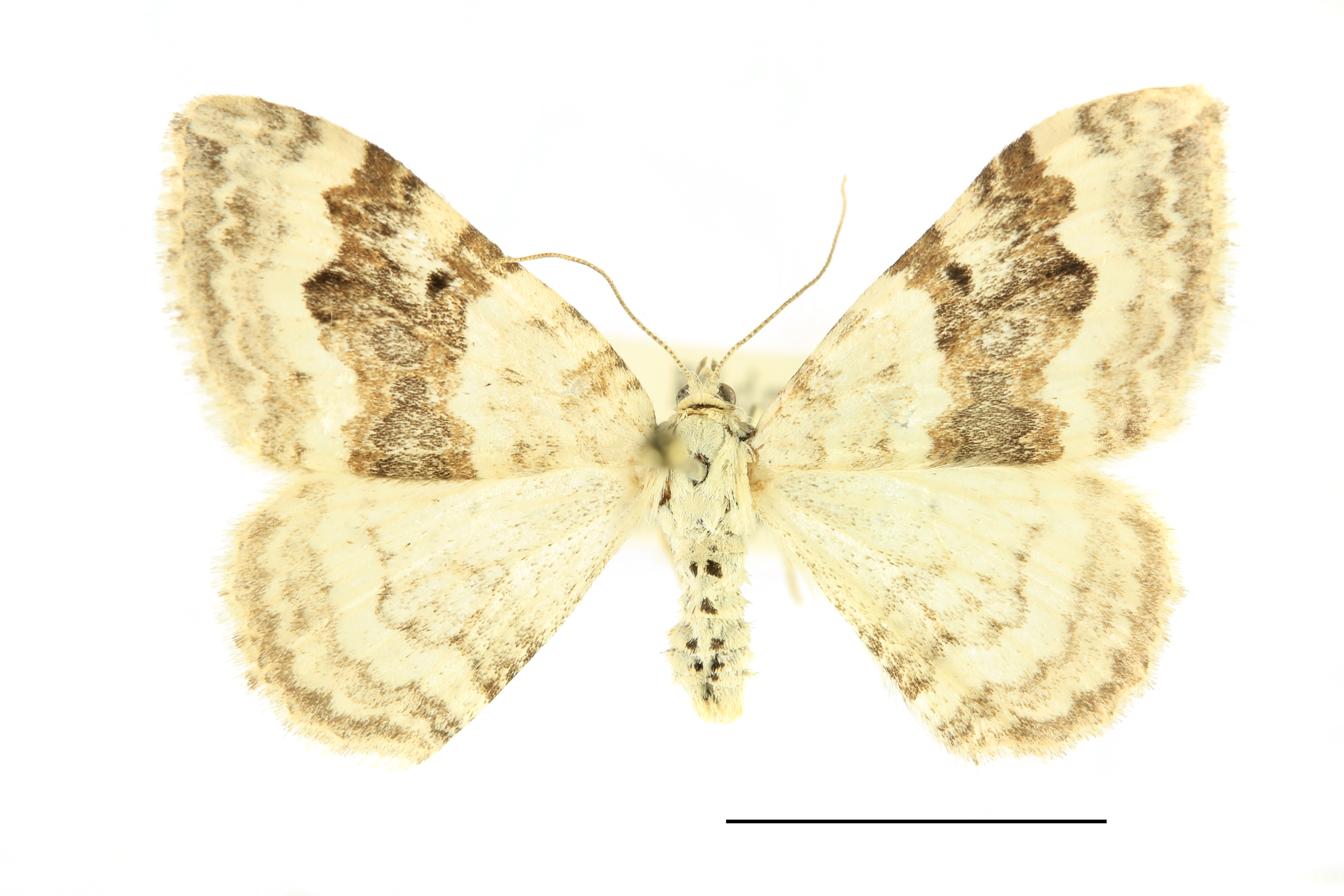

The wingspan is 29–33 mm although some northern races may be smaller. The forewings are white with a broad shaded band which varies from pale grey to almost black. The hindwings are also white with pale fascia and a small black discal spot.

In The Macrolepidoptera of the World Louis Beethoven Prout wrote:

Another very variable species. In the typical form the median band is pale-centred and the distal area rather weakly marked. - In ab. fuscomarginata Stgr. both are broadly fuscous-margined, containing a distinct white subterminal line. In ab. continuata Krulik the median band is solid, brown or blackish, not interrupted by any white patch. — In ab. degenerata Prout the median area is narrowed and broken into two parts, a larger anterior and a smaller posterior.- ab. costimaculata Rbl. shows only the anterior half of the band. - ab. limbaria Hbn.is a more extreme development, with the band reduced to a very small patch on the discocellulars. - ab. unicolor Rbl. has the wings entirely suffused with smoky black, the median band of the forewing faintly indicated. Taken in S. Yorkshire.In addition to these casual aberrations montanata shows a strong tendency to the formation of local races. Staudinger considers fuscomarginata as such in the Pyrenees, Alps, etc. But in any case the following appear noteworthly: iberica Stgr. high elevations in the mountains of Castile and Andalusia, with the forewing white-yellowish, with less markings and these less distinct, the median band narrowed and more fuscous. - lapponica Stgr. from Northern Scandinavia and N. E. Siberia, a smaller, paler form with the markings (except the discal dot) quite weak. - ab. albicans Strand merely indicates the extreme specimens of lapponica, with the markings (except the discal dot) not or scarcely visible - shetlandica Weir, from the Shetland Islands, is of the same average size as lapponica, but forms a striking contrast to it. It has the forewing much more variegated, the ground-colour suffused with ochreous between the basal and median bands and distally, the median band sharply marked at least at its edges, sometimes pale in the centre, sometimes mixed with bright ochreous brown.

The species flies from May to July, usually at dusk. It will come to light but is not strongly attracted.

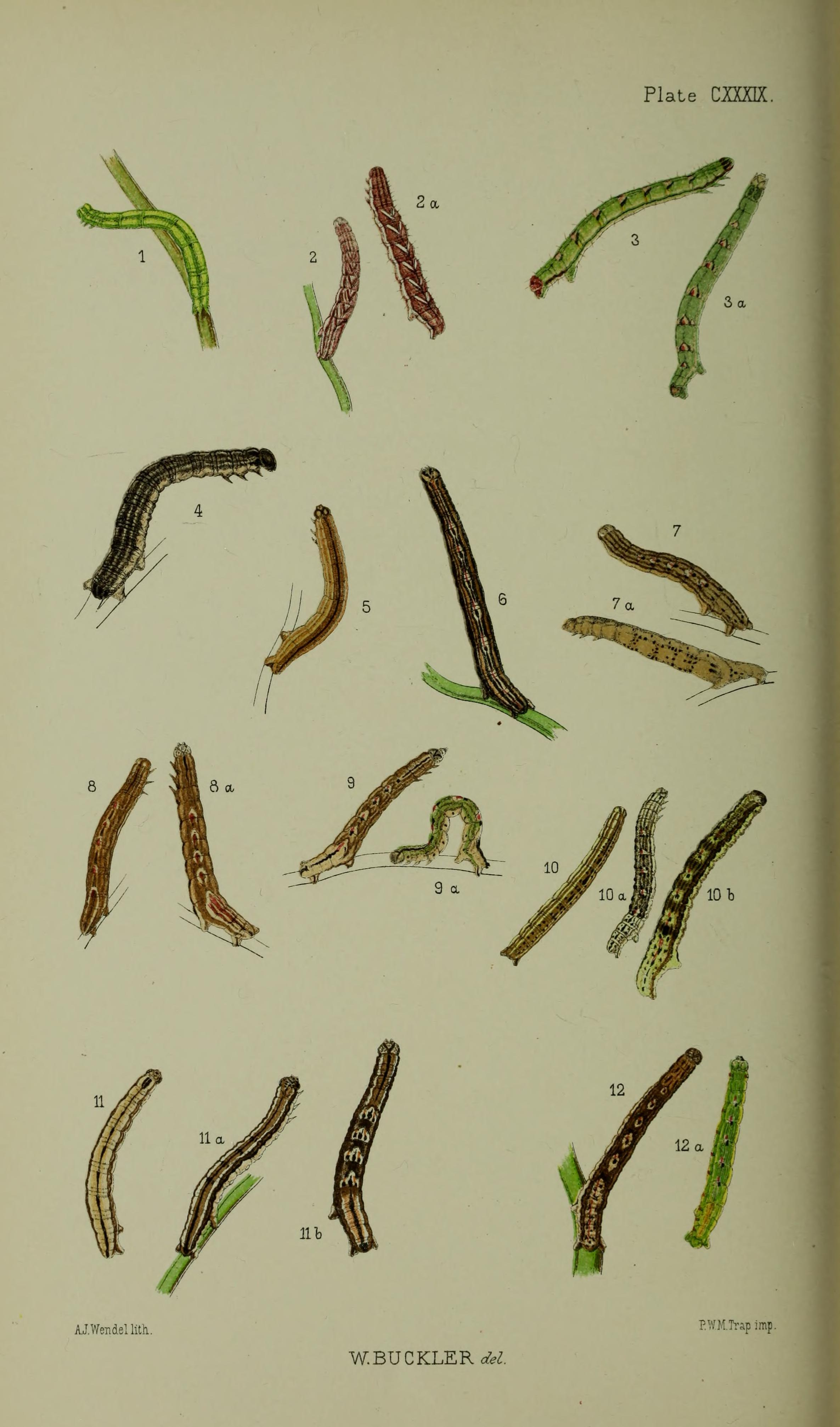
Figs 10, 10a, 10b larvae in various stages of growth

The larva is grey with a purplish-brown back. It has been recorded feeding on bedstraw, Corydalis, globeflower, hemlock and primrose and probably feeds on other low-growing plants. The species overwinters as a larva.

1. The flight season refers to the British Isles. This may vary in other parts of the range.

== Subspecies ==
- X. m. iberica
- X. m. lapponica
- X. m. montanata
- X. m. shetlandica
