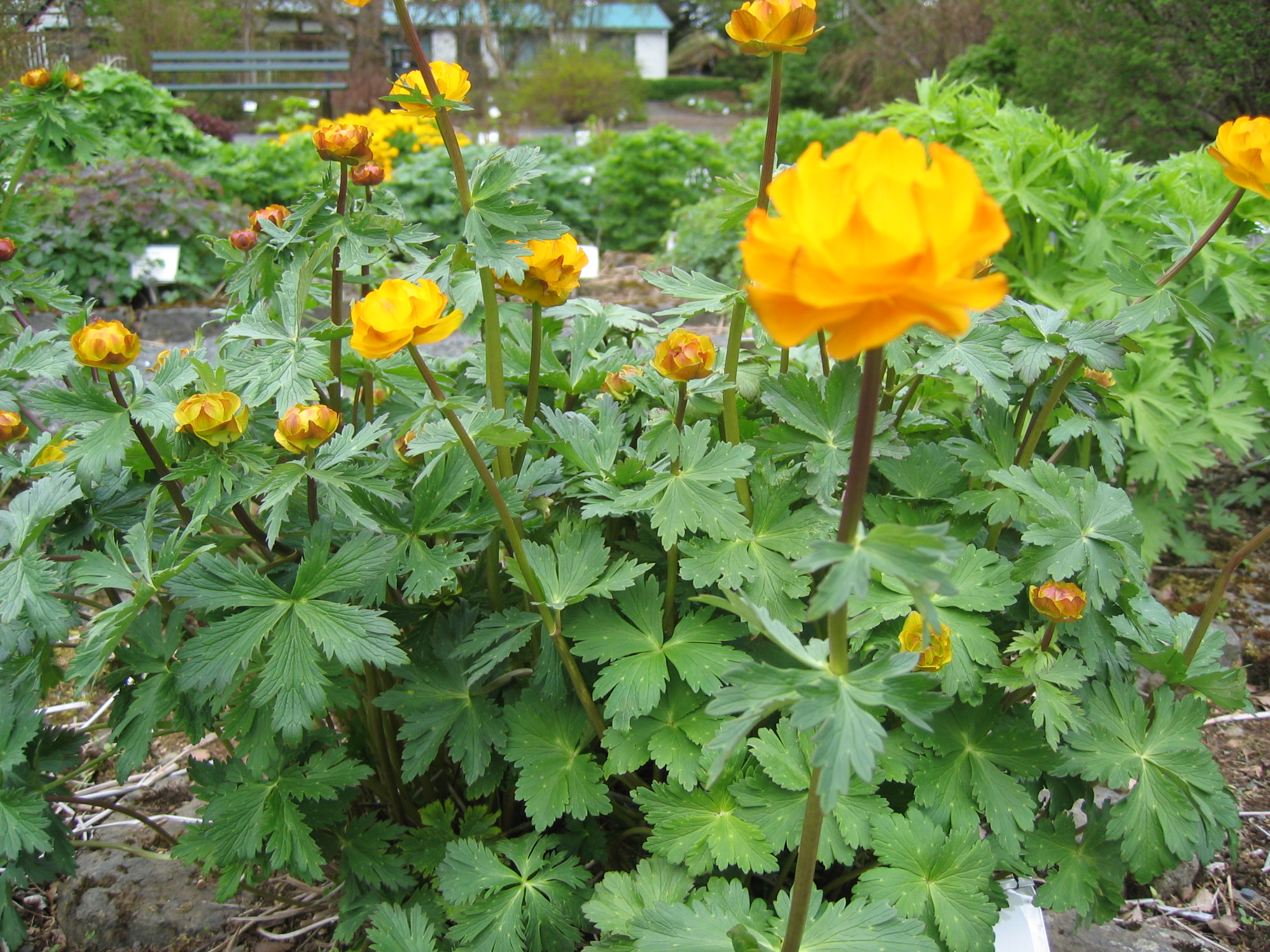

Scientific classification
- Kingdom: Plantae
- Clade: Tracheophytes
- Clade: Angiosperms
- Clade: Eudicots
- Order: Ranunculales
- Family: Ranunculaceae
- Genus: Trollius
- Species: T. altaicus

Binomial name
- Trollius altaicus C.A.Mey

= Trollius altaicus =

Species of flowering plant

Trollius altaicus is an ornamental plant of the family Ranunculaceae, native to an area from Central Asia east to Japan and Sakhalin. This plant usually grows in wet places, especially in valleys.

== Subspecies ==
Three subspecies of Trollius altaicus are recognised:

- Trollius altaicus subsp. altaicus
- Trollius altaicus subsp. pulcher (Makino) Kadota – Japan
- Trollius altaicus subsp. sachalinensis Kadota – Sakhalin
