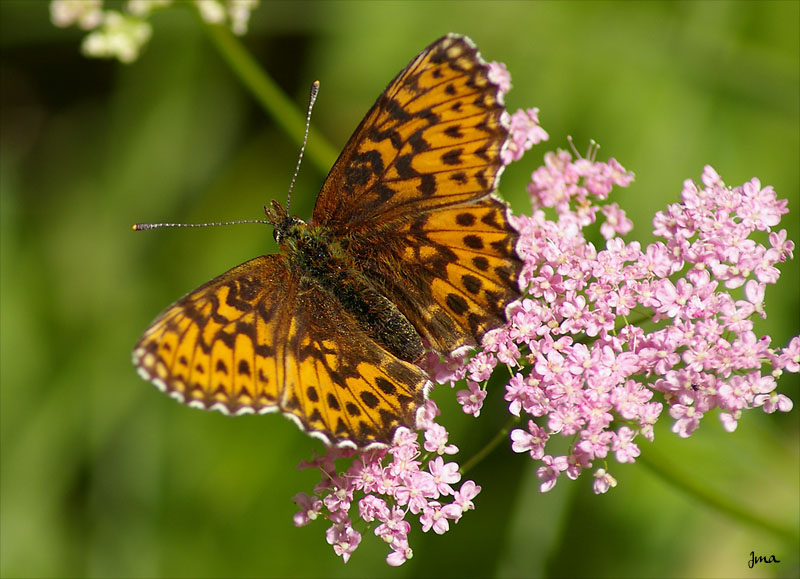
- Dorsal view
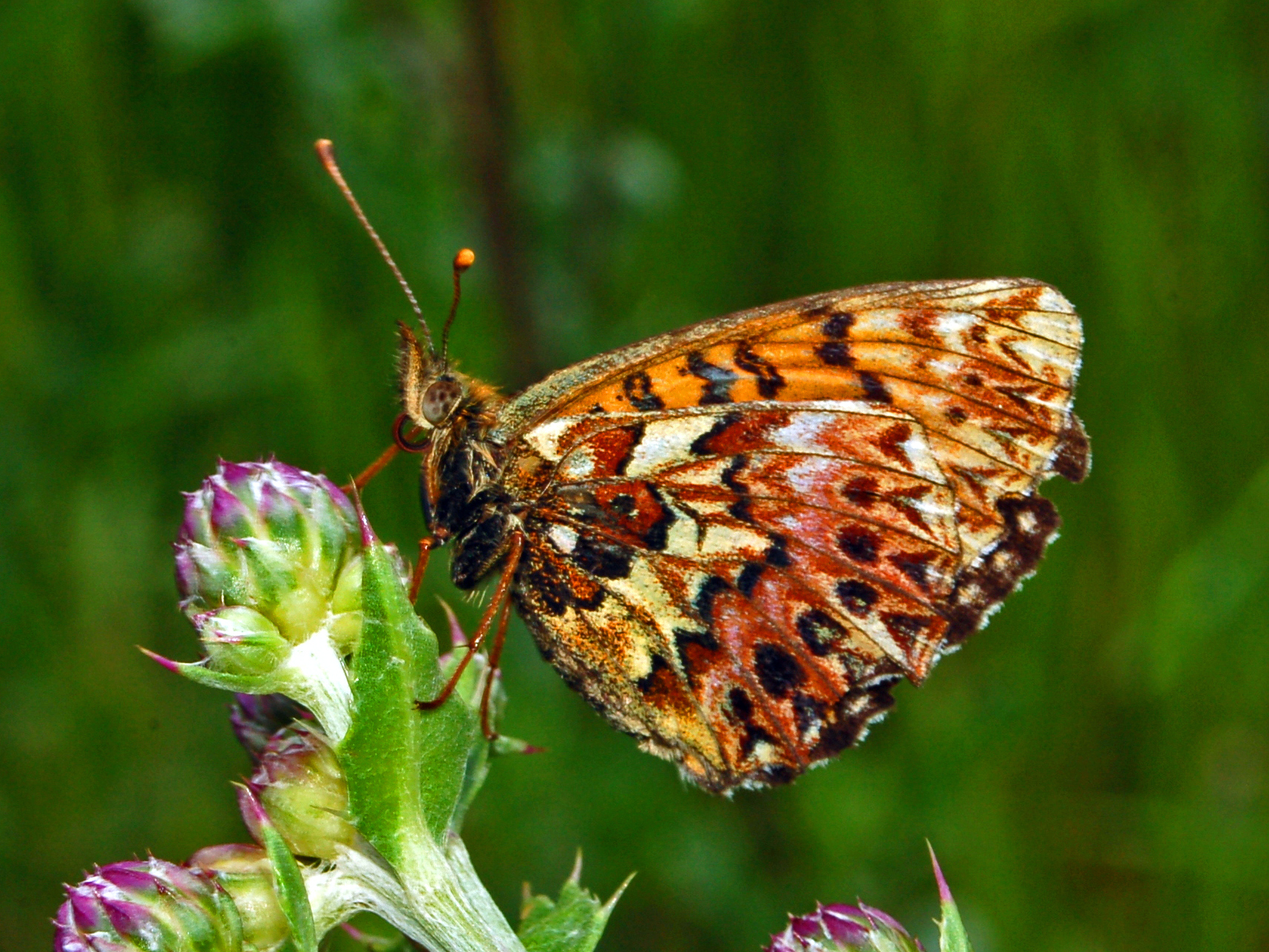
- Ventral view

Scientific classification
- Domain: Eukaryota
- Kingdom: Animalia
- Phylum: Arthropoda
- Class: Insecta
- Order: Lepidoptera
- Family: Nymphalidae
- Genus: Boloria
- Species: B. titania

Binomial name
- Boloria titania (Esper, 1793)

Synonyms
- Clossiana titania; Boloria (clossiana) titania

= Boloria titania =

Species of butterfly

Boloria titania, the Titania's fritillary or purple bog fritillary, is a butterfly of the subfamily Heliconiinae of the family Nymphalidae.

== Description ==
The adult is a small fritillary with a typically chequered orange-brown upperside and a marginal row of triangles and dots. The length of the forewings is 21–23 mm. The underside has brown pearly spots and triangular markings at the edge of the hindwings.

== Description in Seitz ==
A. amathusia Esp. (= diana Hbn., titania Esp., dia major Esp.) (68e). Above similar to large specimens of euphrosyne. The hindwing beneath is very characteristic, being strongly variegated with purple, its distal band deeply dentate on both sides and bearing purple-brown partly pale-centred dots. In the nymotypical form the forewing beneath also shows at the distal margin pointed teeth which project far on to the disc... In the Alps. — bivina Fruhst. is the eastern European form; smaller, paler, with somewhat thinner lilac markings; darker beneath, the median band of the hindwing more uniformly yellow, not being variegated with red; from Saratow. — In sibirica Stgr.[B. titania ssp. staudingeri Wnukowsky, 1929] (68f) the band occupying the distal area much less deeply and more evenly indented on both sides from the mountains of South-West Siberia.

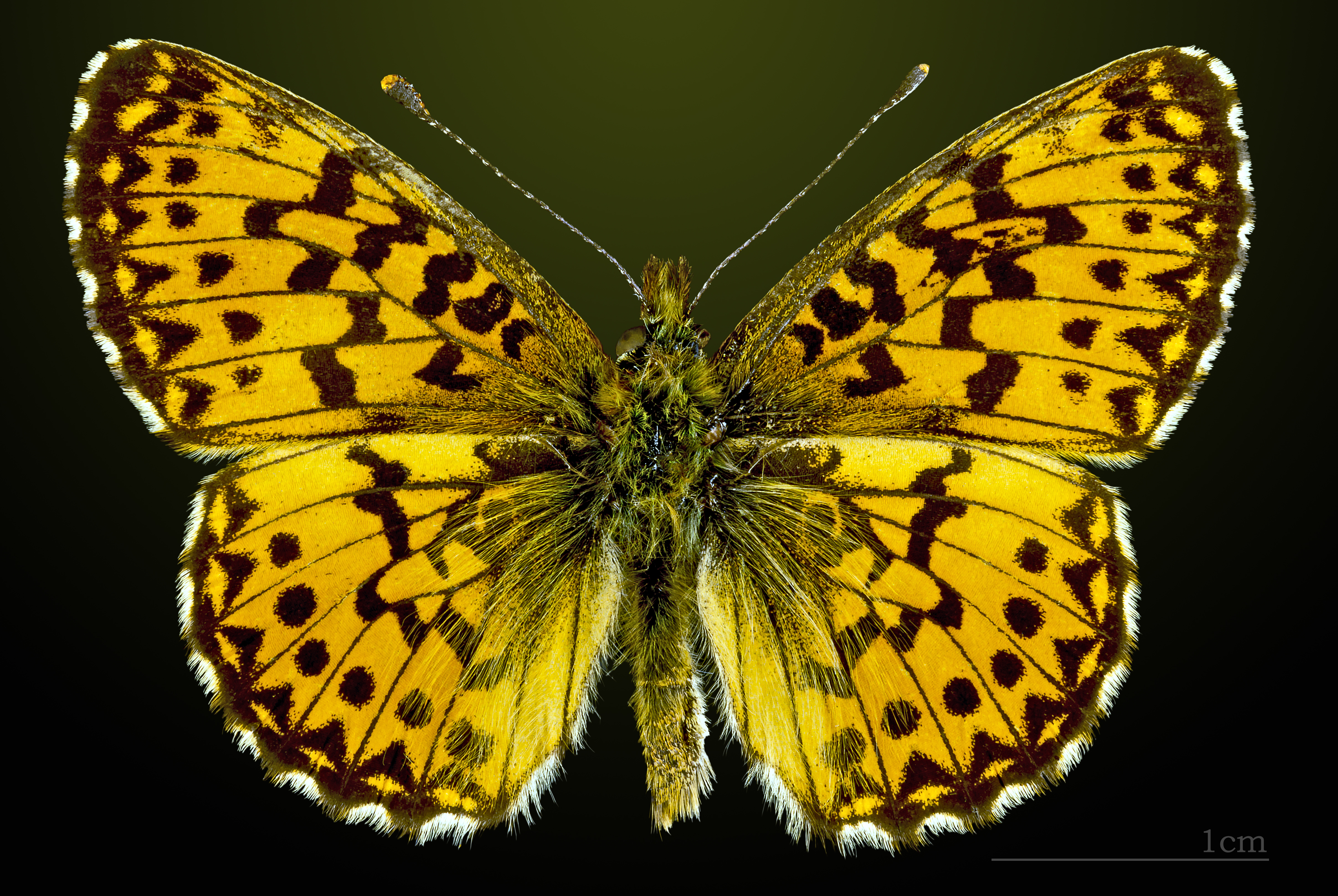
Dosal side

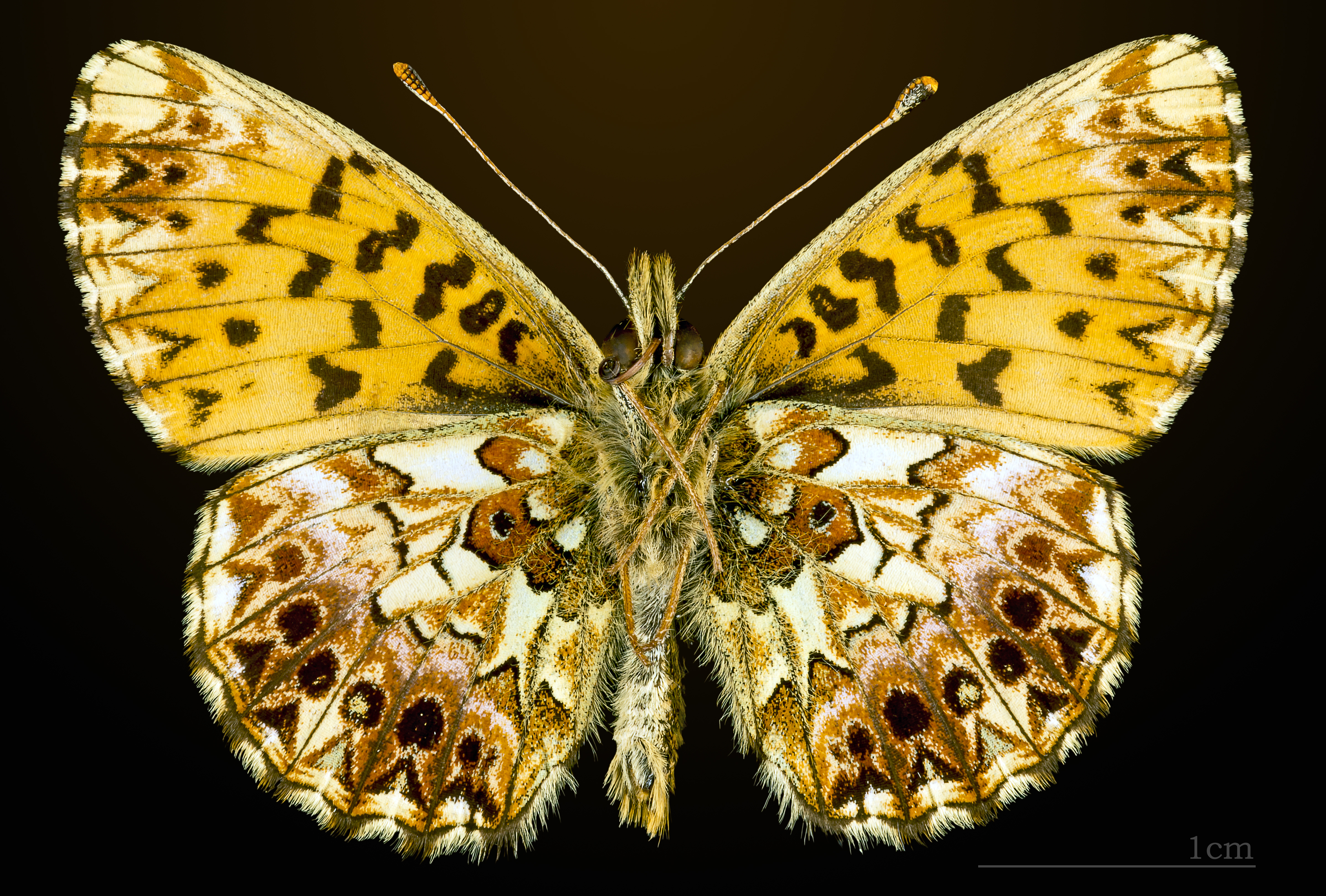
Ventral side

== Distribution ==
This species is present in the Palearctic realm from central Europe to Siberia and the Altai. Small isolates are formed in the Alps, southern Finland, Latvia, Poland, and the Balkans in Europe.

== Subspecies ==
- Clossiana titania titania
- Clossiana titania bivina (Fruhstorfer, 1908) central and southern Europe
- Clossiana titania miyakei (Matsumura, 1919) Sakhalin, Amur
- Clossiana titania staudingeri (Wnukowsky, 1929) southern Siberia

== Biology ==
Depending on the location, the butterfly flies in subalpine meadows from June to August. The larvae feed on Viola species, Vaccinium uliginosum, Bistorta major, Filipendula ulmaria and Trollius asiaticus.

== Etymology ==
Named in the Classical tradition. In Greek mythology, Titanide is a daughter of the Titans. Her sisters are Theia, Rhea, Themis, Mnemosyne, Phoebe, and Tethys.
