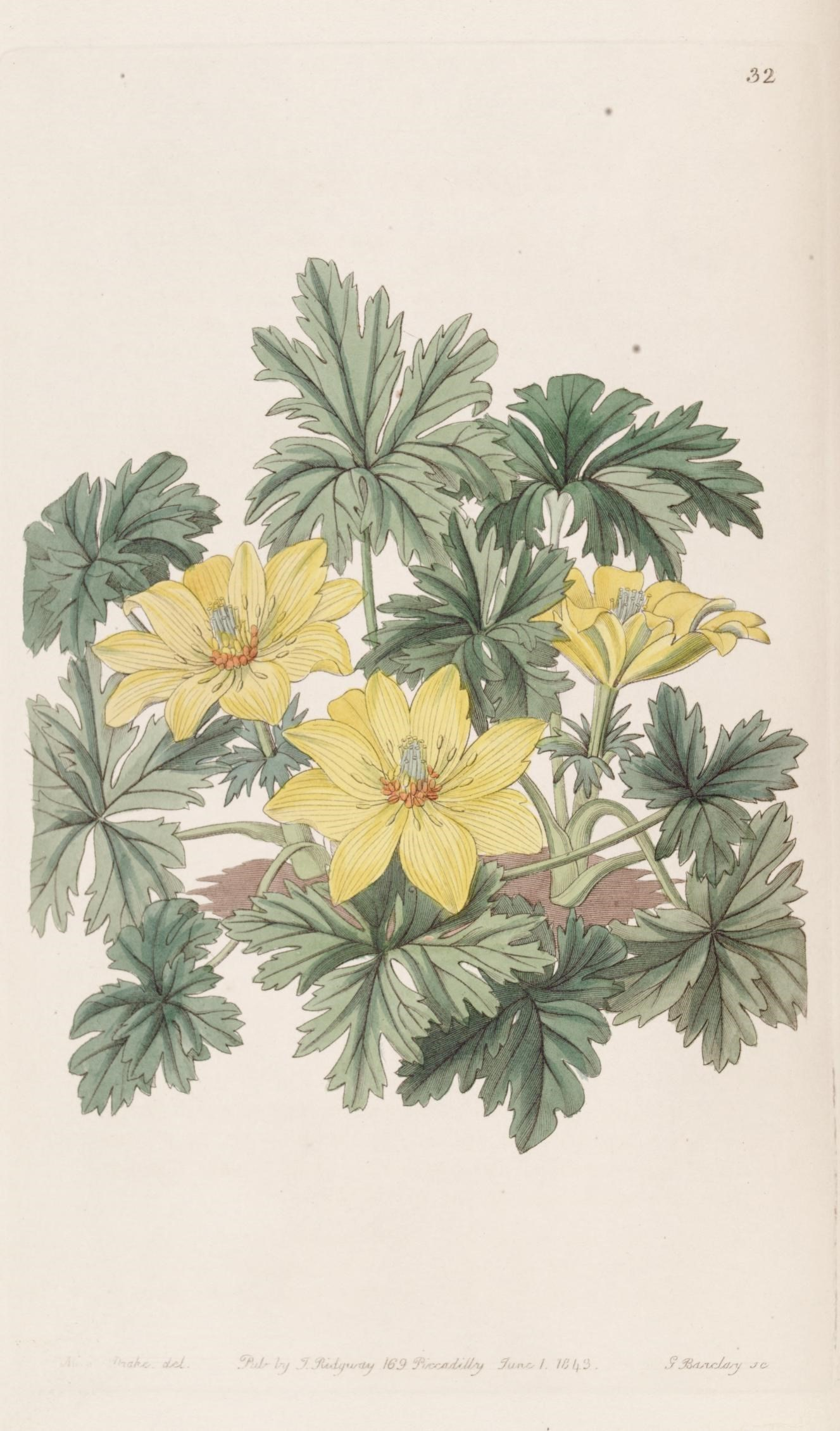

Scientific classification
- Kingdom: Plantae
- Clade: Tracheophytes
- Clade: Angiosperms
- Clade: Eudicots
- Order: Ranunculales
- Family: Ranunculaceae
- Genus: Trollius
- Species: T. acaulis

Binomial name
- Trollius acaulis Lindl.

= Trollius acaulis =

Species of flowering plant

Trollius acaulis is a species of flowering plant within the family Ranunculaceae.

== Description ==
Trollius acaulis is a clump forming perennial species. This species has deeply lobed leaves with long petioles. The flowers of this species are yellow in colour and possess 12 to 16 petals. Flowers are solitary and measure up to 5 cm in diameter.

== Distribution and habitat ==
Trollius acaulis is native to Southern Asia, where it is distributed within the countries of Afghanistan, Pakistan and Nepal. It can also be found within the Western Himalayas mountain range. It is the only known Trollius species native to Pakistan. The species grows on elevated alpine meadows slopes in moist soils. Plants can be found at altitudes up to 4100 metres above sea level.
