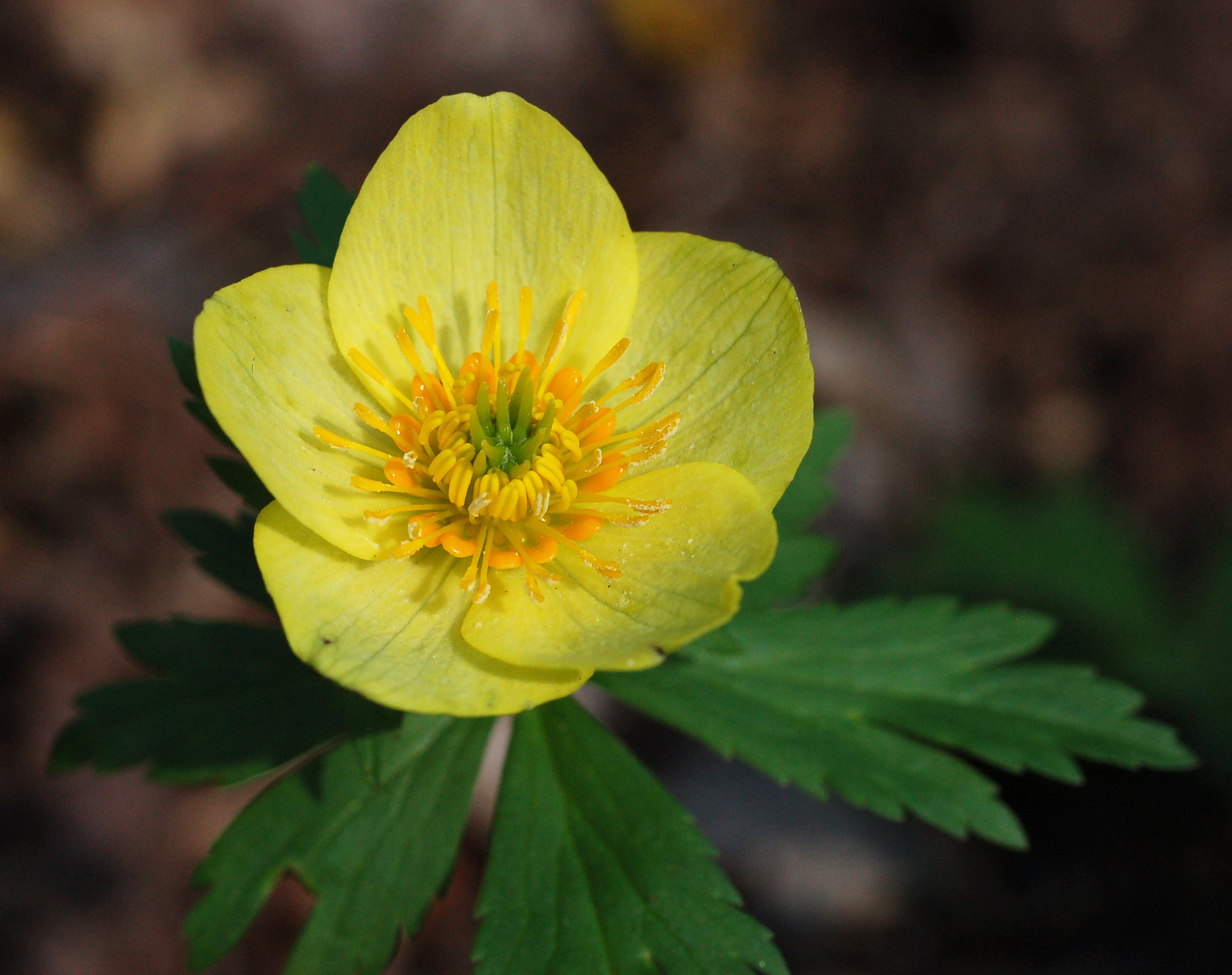
- American globeflower

Scientific classification
- Kingdom: Plantae
- Clade: Tracheophytes
- Clade: Angiosperms
- Clade: Eudicots
- Order: Ranunculales
- Family: Ranunculaceae
- Genus: Trollius
- Species: T. laxus

Binomial name
- Trollius laxus Salisb.

= Trollius laxus =

Species of flowering plant

Trollius laxus is a rare flowering plant species in the buttercup family, Ranunculaceae. It is native to North America and is considered to have two subspecies, one with a distribution is the east and one in the west. Common names for Trollius laxus include American globeflower and American spreading globeflower. The American Globeflower, Trollius laxus is an endangered species of flowering plants Native to Northeastern United States. This species of plants is limited in range by their ability to exclusively survive in wetlands and marshes. Thus, clusters of the species are constantly threatened by the ever-changing hydrology of the range they are confined to.

== Subspecies ==
The two subspecies of Trollius laxus are:

- T. laxus ssp. albiflorus (A. Gray) A. Löve & D. Löve & Kapoor 1971
- T. laxus ssp. laxus

Subspecies albiflorus has a distribution over southwestern Canada and northwestern United States, while ssp. laxus has a range in the northeastern U.S., limited to parts of Connecticut, New Jersey, New York, Ohio and Pennsylvania.

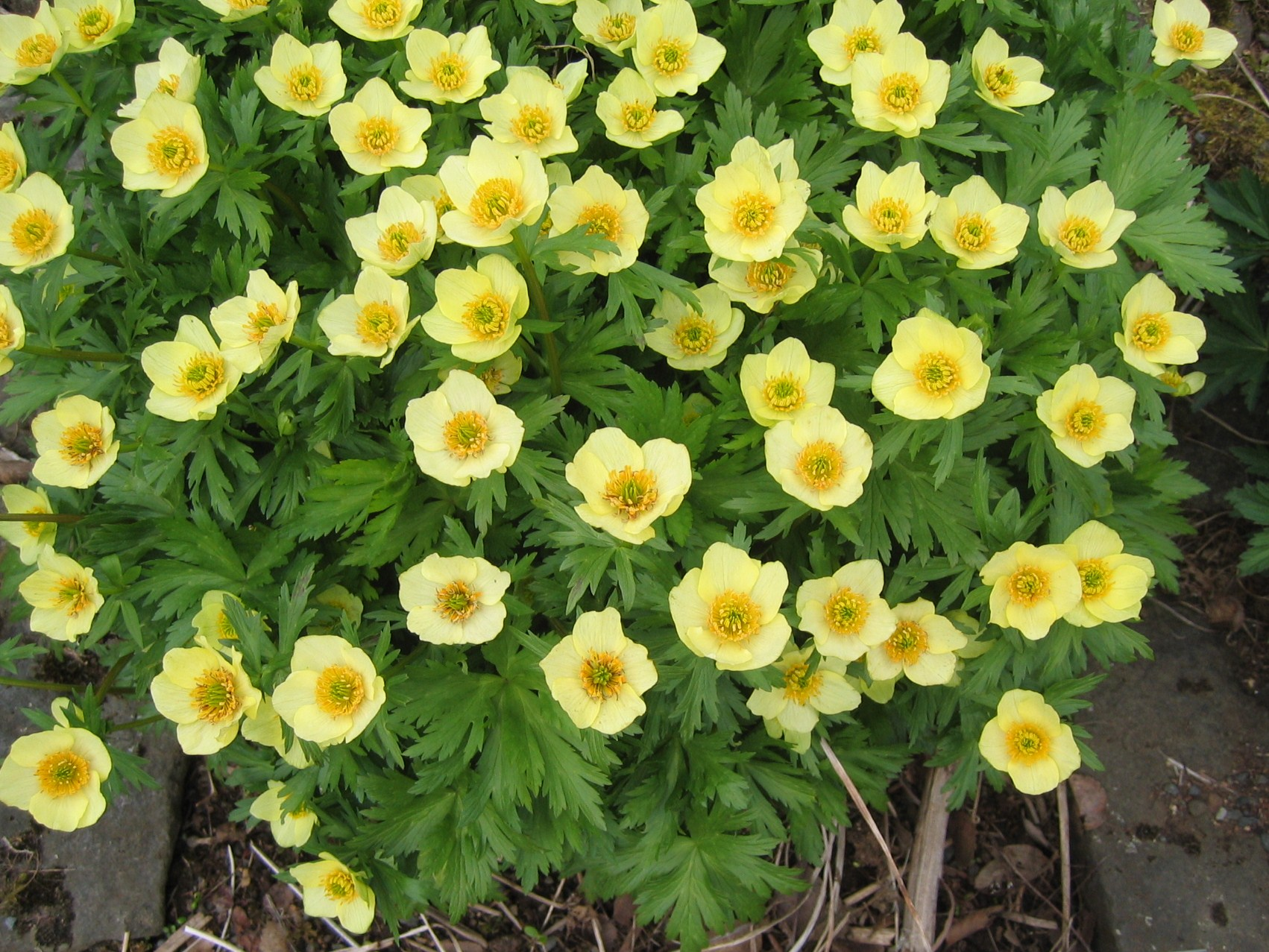

== Distribution ==
Trollius laxus is a rare, herbaceous perennial only found in a small range of fens or wetland habitats fed by groundwater in northeastern United States. In these calcium rich fens, the T. laxus can be locally abundant. They can also be found in Oregon, Washington, British Columbia and the Rocky Mountains of Colorado. During spring, T. laxus is one of the first flowers to bloom in the Rocky Mountain. Its distribution is limited by light intensity and hydrology.

Wetlands and marshes have consistent groundwater discharge which means that water levels will typically be high in these areas. This will result in anoxia and ultimately lower the amount of nutrients present. It is thought that the plants evolved to endure these conditions so that they have less competition for sunlight. While T. laxus prefers these wetter conditions, the plant can also grow in drier conditions if there is enough sunlight present. Increased sunlight will increase the biomass of these plants but, there is a threshold before the plant's growth will plateau or even decline. The combination of seasonal drying along with very high light intensities can result in the competitive exclusion of T. laxus. In order for T. laxus to meet this requirement of light intensity and hydrology, it must sacrifice the size of its range. This is a factor that causes its distribution to be limited.

== Habitat and Ecology ==
Trollius laxus is a perennial found predominantly in forested wetlands with cold alkaline groundwater. This plant is one of the first to flower in the spring from mid-April to early May in Connecticut, and the seeds are ripened by mid-June where they are dispersed passively with the help of wind and water.

Trollius laxus has few effective pollinators including the sweat bee, the Cuckoo bee, and a fly within the family Tachinidae. Molluscan herbivores such as slugs and snails can cause leaf damage impacting the overall plant community diversity. Slug predation on T. laxus affects its seedling survival, as well as competition and predation due to the presence of neighboring plants and herbivores. Removing neighboring plants lowers the predation risk on T. Laxus and increases its growth and reproductive success.

Trollius laxus may also occur in forested wetlands so it may be well-adapted to growing under closed forest canopies. Field observations have indicated that both light and groundwater levels affect T. laxus plant and population vigor, and that the distribution of T. laxus may be limited by competition with other plants.

== Morphology ==
Trollius laxus is easily identifiable by botanists due to their showy bright yellow flowers which are globular in shape. When flower is absent, other characteristics can be used to identify the plant. This herbaceous flowering plant with a one to two foot stems, thick and fibrous roots, and basal leaves. The plant can include one or more stems, each with a cream or pale yellow flower up to 5 cm in diameter with 5-7 petaloid sepals. The actual petals are reduced to staminodes with basal nectar glands. Each leaf of Trollius laxus consists of five three-lobed leaflets that spread horizontally from the tip of the petiole. Each leaflet has sharp teething margins. The leaves sprout on petioles which grow from the base of the plant.

== Fruits and flowers ==
This herbaceous plant is one of the first to bloom in the spring. The flowering stalk is usually longer than the leaf stalk. The flowers are terminal, meaning the grow at the tip of the flowering stalk and each stalk has one flower. Each flower has five veiny sepals and in the center of the flower sit numerous stamens and ten to fifteen petals deep yellow or orange in color. Hidden among the petals are five or more separate fruits. The fruit of Trollius laxus are dry with each follicle containing three to six seeds on average, and are formed in aggregate on the stems. The flowers of T. laxus range from white to yellow in color with nectar glands at the base, and can grow up to five centimeters in diameter. Both flowering and fruit level are positively correlated with light intensity, possibly due to pollinators being able to travel longer distances after leaving a warmer flower than a colder one.

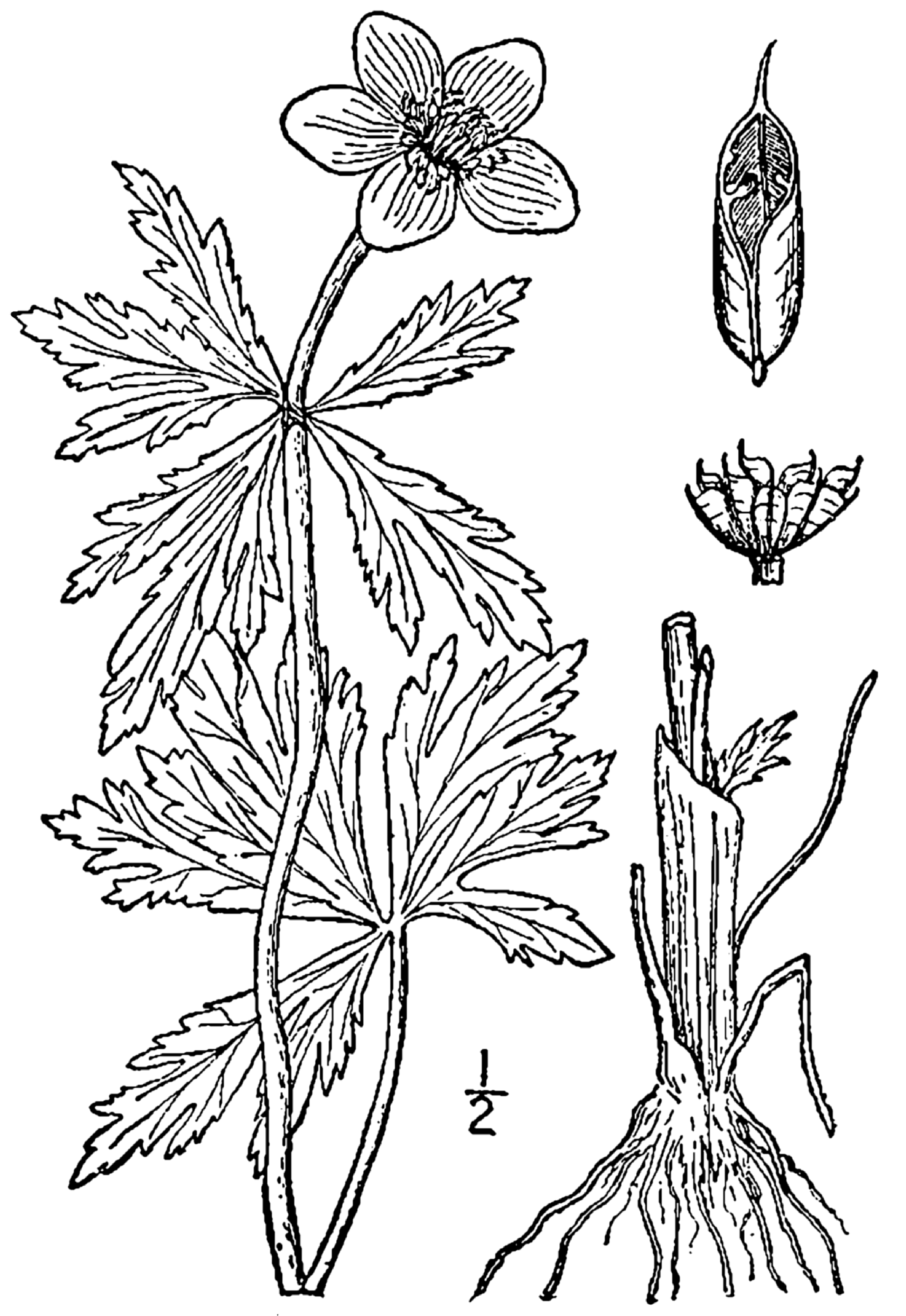
