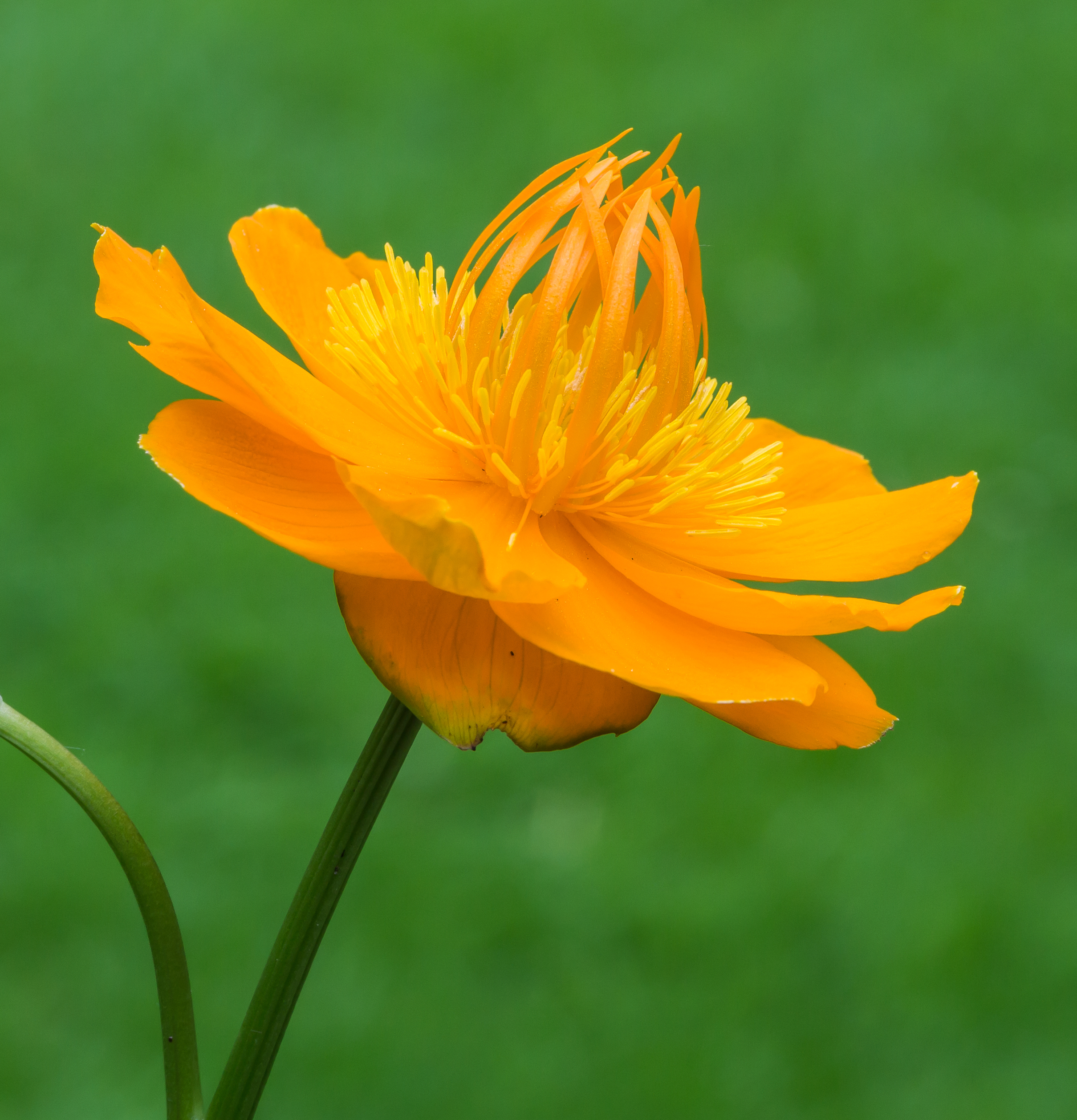
- Trollius chinensis 'Golden Queen' cultivar

Scientific classification
- Kingdom: Plantae
- Clade: Embryophytes
- Clade: Tracheophytes
- Clade: Spermatophytes
- Clade: Angiosperms
- Clade: Eudicots
- Order: Ranunculales
- Family: Ranunculaceae
- Genus: Trollius
- Species: T. chinensis

Binomial name
- Trollius chinensis Bunge

Synonyms
- List: Trollius chinensis subsp. macropetalus (Regel) Luferov; Trollius macropetalus (Regel) F.Schmidt ex W.T.Wang; Trollius vitalii Stepanov; Trollius vitalii f. asiaticifolius Stepanov; Trollius vitalii var. forficuloides Stepanov; Trollius vitalii var. nadeshdae Stepanov

= Trollius chinensis =

Chinese globeflower

Species of flowering plant

Trollius chinensis, the Chinese globeflower, is a species of flowering plant in the family Ranunculaceae, found from southern Siberia to the southern Russian Far East, Sakhalin, the Kurils, Mongolia, Korea, and northern China (to north Henan). Its cultivar 'Golden Queen' has gained the Royal Horticultural Society's Award of Garden Merit.

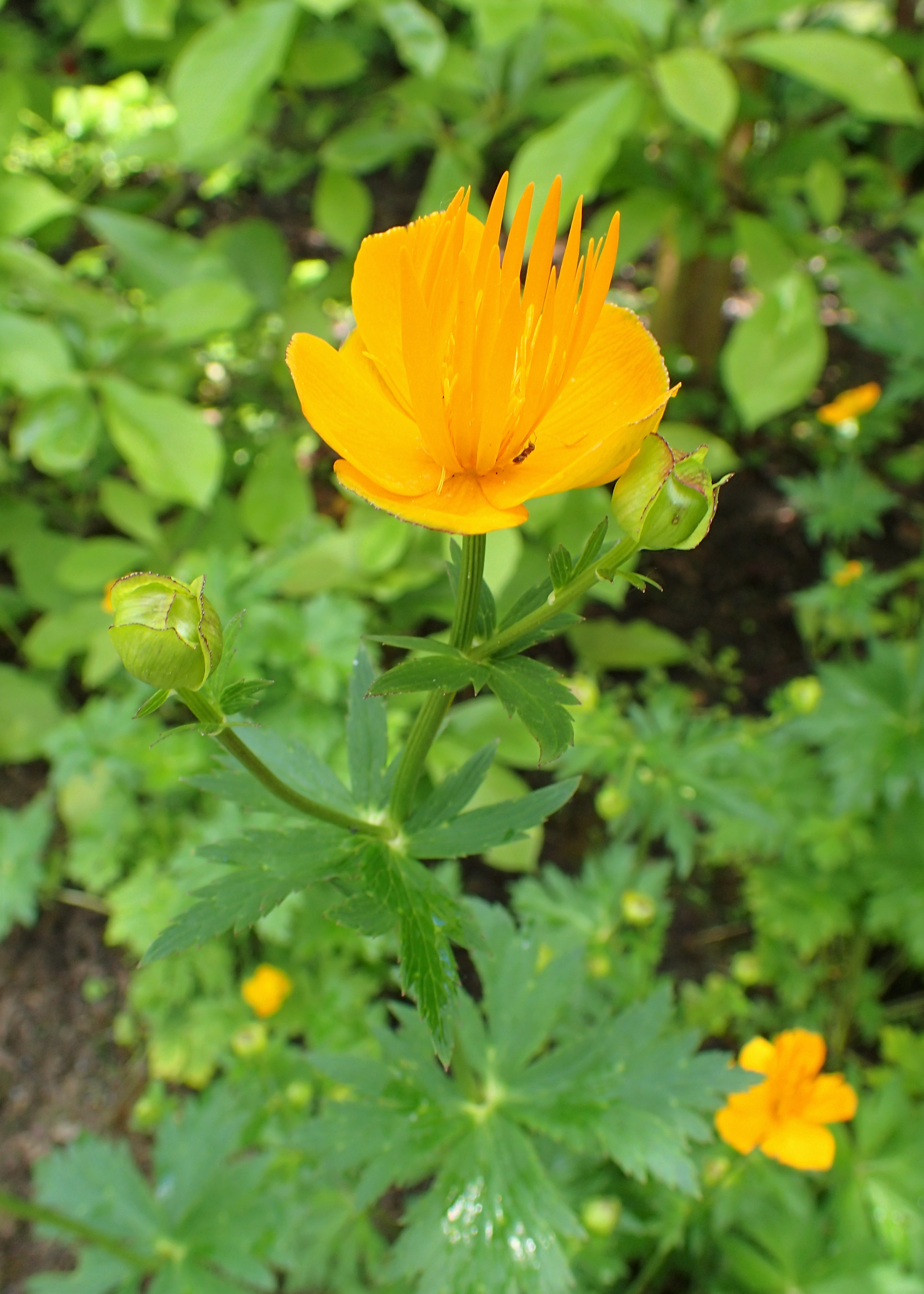
Flower, flowerbuds and foliage

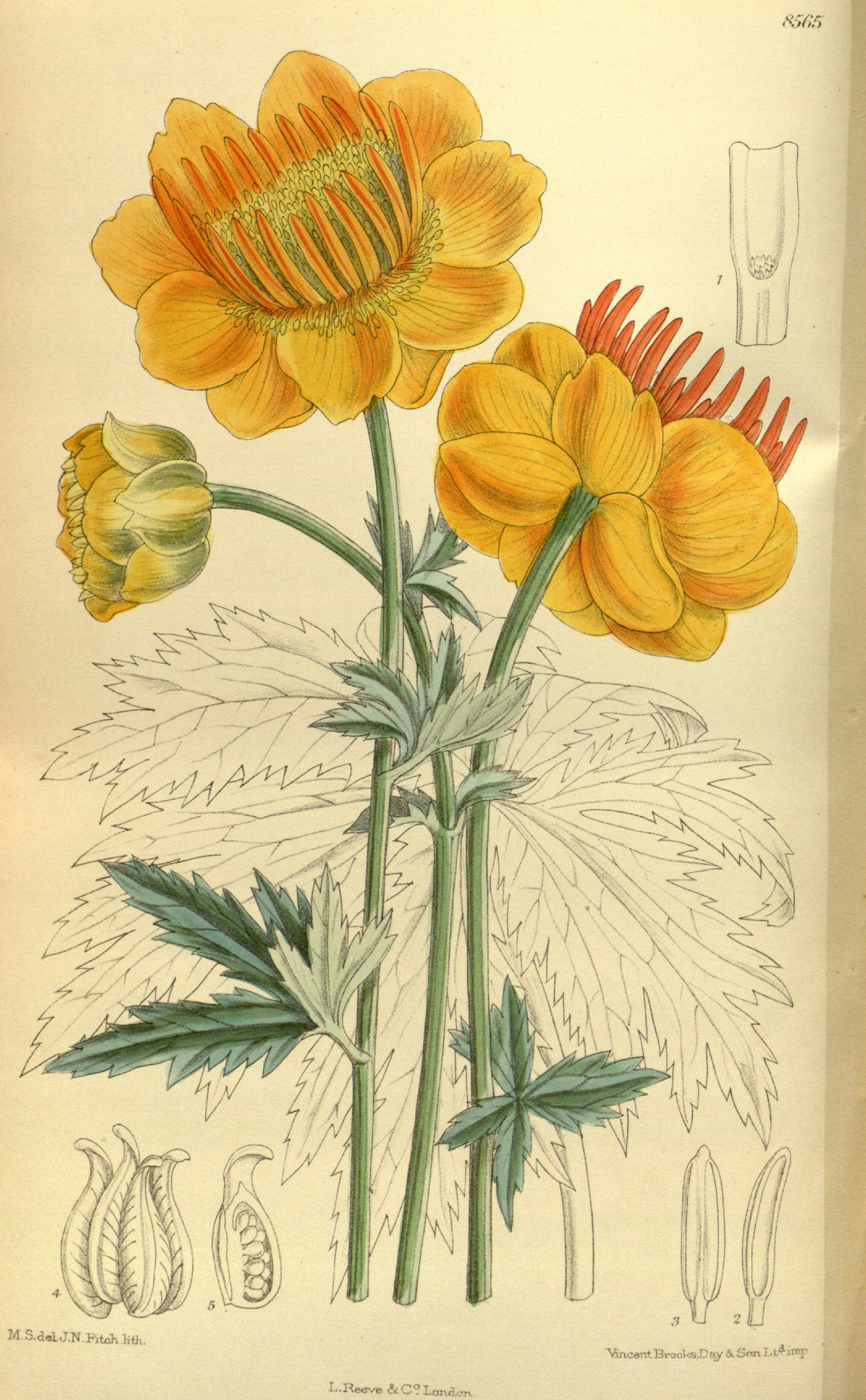
Botanical illustration

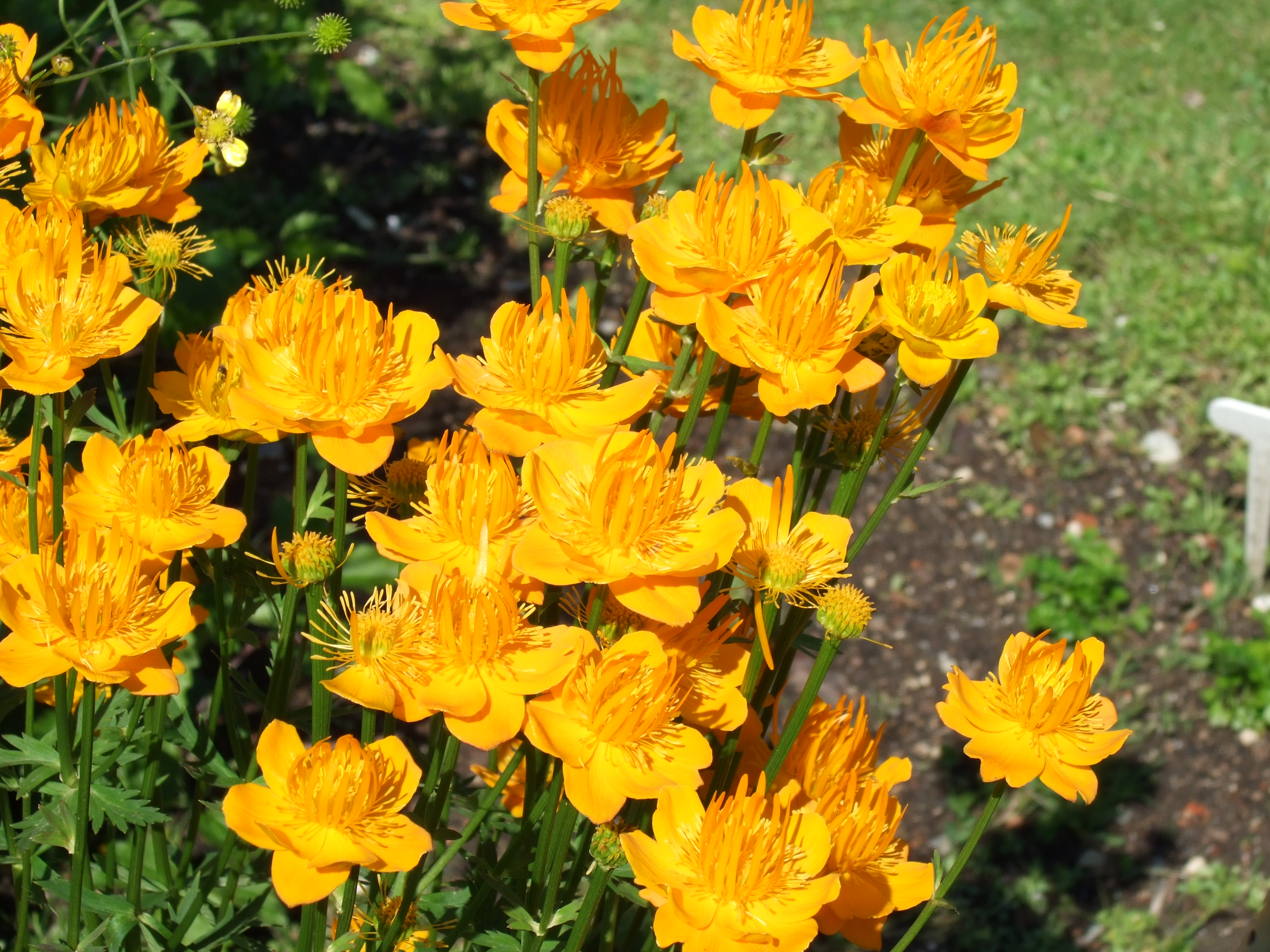
Grouping

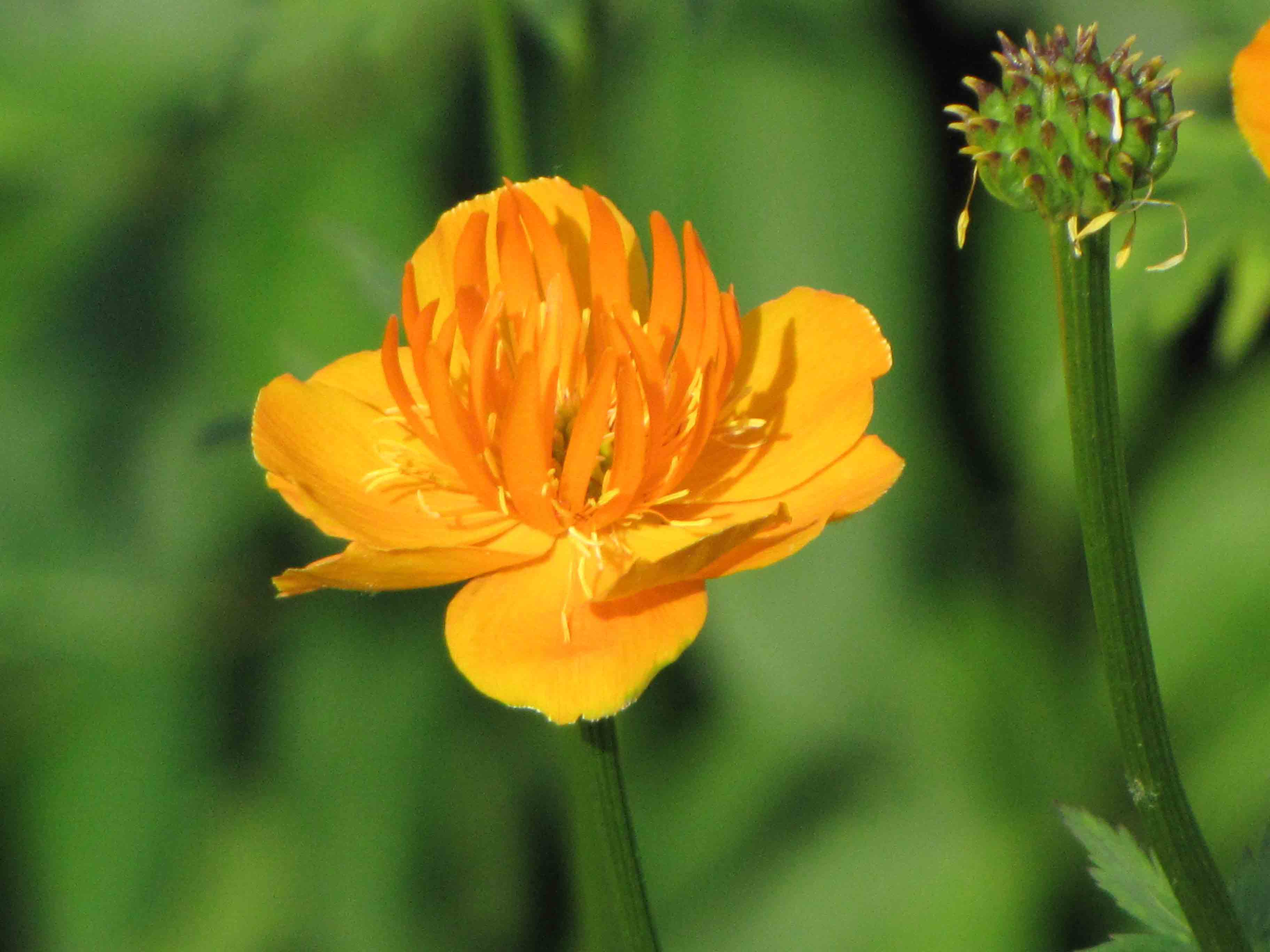
Flower and developing ovary
