= Richard Weaver (entomologist) =

English insect collector (1783–1857)

Richard Weaver (1783 – 11 December 1857) was a British entomological collector, taxidermist, and shoemaker, who is best known for the discovery of what has been called Weaver's Fritillary Boloria dia. He founded a Birmingham museum of natural history in 1832 which closed down in 1841.

Weaver was born of humble origins in 1783 in Worcester. He worked as a shoemaker and cobbler in Birmingham and took to natural history possibly in 1814 or after a doctor told him to walk in the countryside for health around 1818. He began to collect butterflies and moths and also trained in bird taxidermy. He began to put together a collection of butterflies and other natural history specimens which grew so much that by 1828 he began a small museum at his premises on 38 New Street, moving later to the Associate Artists Institution on Temple Street. His museum was visited by J. Wallace in 1832 who described it as having 5000 species of insects. The museum closed by 1841 when Weaver moved to Worcester and he returned to Birmingham the next year. He made trips to Scotland in search of rare specimens such as the Arran brown and traded insects for bird skins and corresponded with other naturalists including James Charles Dale. His collection was visited by William Thomas Bree who first noticed the unusual fritillary in Weaver's collection in 1832. The record was considered doubtful by many but Weaver insisted that he had collection the specimens himself. Weaver suffered from asthma through his life and died after a short illness. He tried to sell his collection in March 1857 and his collection was sold after his death in 1858 and some of the bird specimens went to Birmingham Museums while another lot was purchased by Queen's College for £1500. The insect collections went through several sales.
