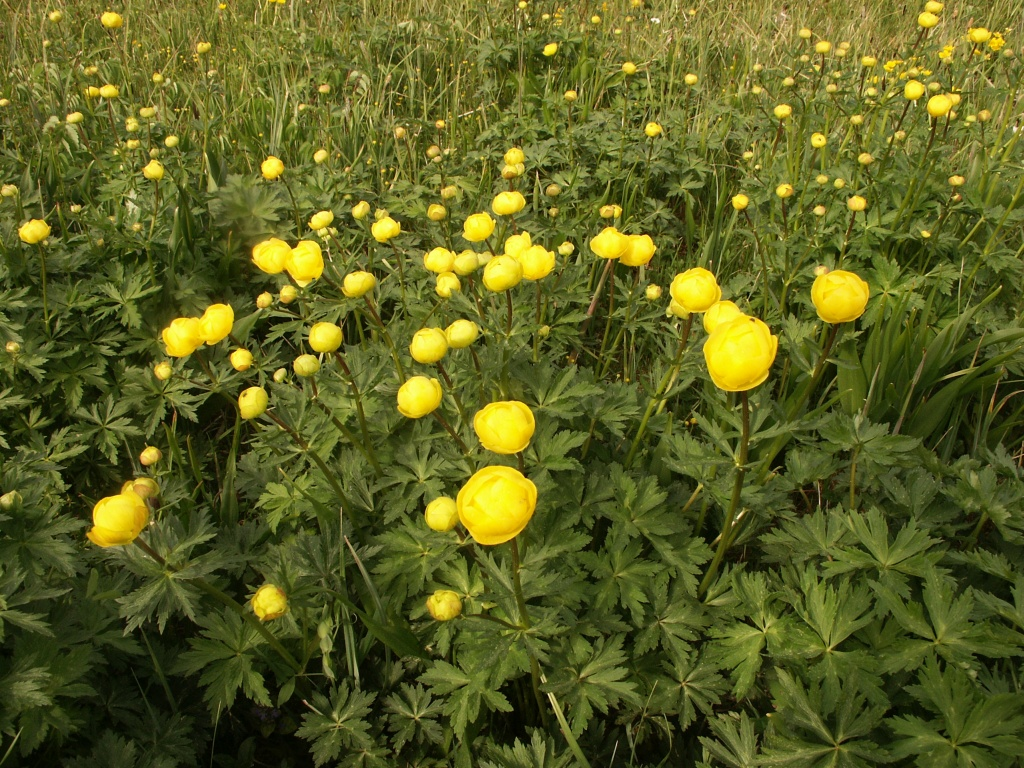
- Trollius europaeus

Scientific classification
- Kingdom: Plantae
- Clade: Embryophytes
- Clade: Tracheophytes
- Clade: Spermatophytes
- Clade: Angiosperms
- Clade: Eudicots
- Order: Ranunculales
- Family: Ranunculaceae
- Subfamily: Ranunculoideae
- Tribe: Adonideae
- Genus: Trollius; L.

Species
- About 30, including: Trollius acaulis Trollius altaicus Trollius asiaticus Trollius austrosibiricus Trollius chinensis Trollius dschungaricus Trollius europaeus Trollius farreri Trollius japonicus Trollius laxus Trollius ledebourii Trollius lilacinus Trollius paluster Trollius papaverus Trollius pumilus Trollius ranunculinus Trollius yunnanensis

Synonyms
- Ranunculastrum Heist. ex Fabr.; Gaissenia Raf.; Hegemone Bunge ex Ledeb.

= Trollius =

Genus of flowering plants in the buttercup family

Trollius is a genus of about 30 species of flowering plants closely related to Ranunculus, in the family Ranunculaceae. The common name of some species is globeflower or globe flower. The generic name is derived from the Swiss-German word "Trollblume", meaning a rounded flower. Native to the cool temperate regions of the Northern Hemisphere, with the greatest diversity of species in Asia, species of the genus Trollius usually grow in heavy, wet clay soils.

== Description ==
Species of the genus Trollius are mostly herbaceous, fibrous rooted perennials with bright yellow, orange or lilac coloured flowers. The name "globe flower" refers to the petals of T. europaeus and T. × cultorum which are curved over the top of the flower, forming a globe. But T. pumilus has flatter flowers, and T. chinensis has open flowers with prominent stamens.

== Ecology ==
All species of the genus Trollius are poisonous to cattle and other livestock when fresh, but their acrid taste means they are usually left uneaten. They are, however, used as food plants by the larvae of some Lepidoptera species including silver-ground carpet.

Research on Trollius europaeus indicates that its closed, globe-shaped flower form may have evolved as a defense mechanism against the over-exploitation by its seed-eating fly pollinators. These seed-eating fly pollinators, coming from the genus Chiastocheta, lay eggs within the flowers where their larve consume some of the developing seeds while adults facilitate pollination. This creates a specialized and stable mutualistic interaction.

== Cultivation ==
Some species of the genus Trollius are popular ornamental flowers in horticulture, with several cultivars selected for large and brightly coloured flowers. The hybrid T. × cultorum in particular is a source of several garden cultivars, including 'Superbus', which has gained the Royal Horticultural Society's Award of Garden Merit.

== Image gallery ==
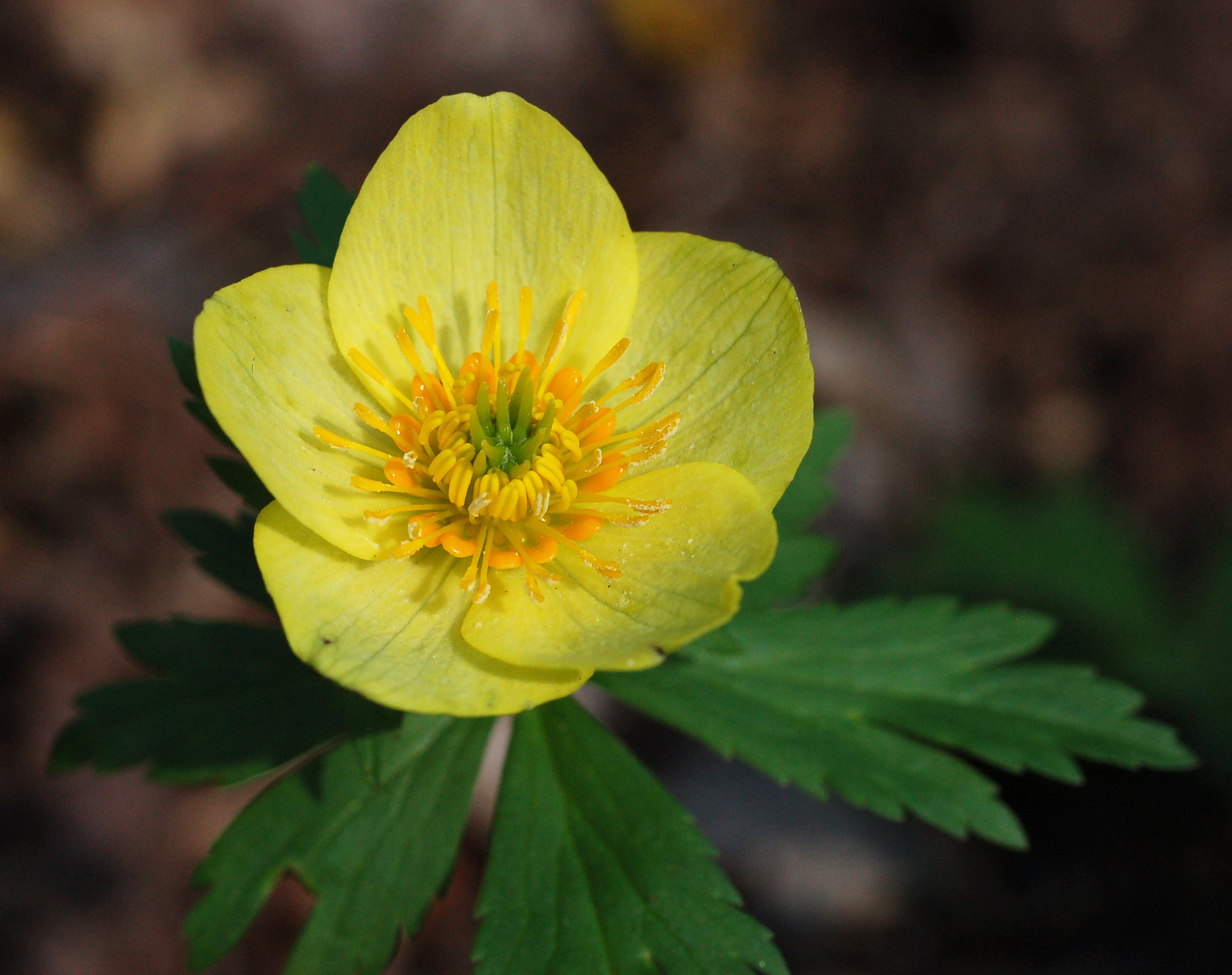
Trollius laxus

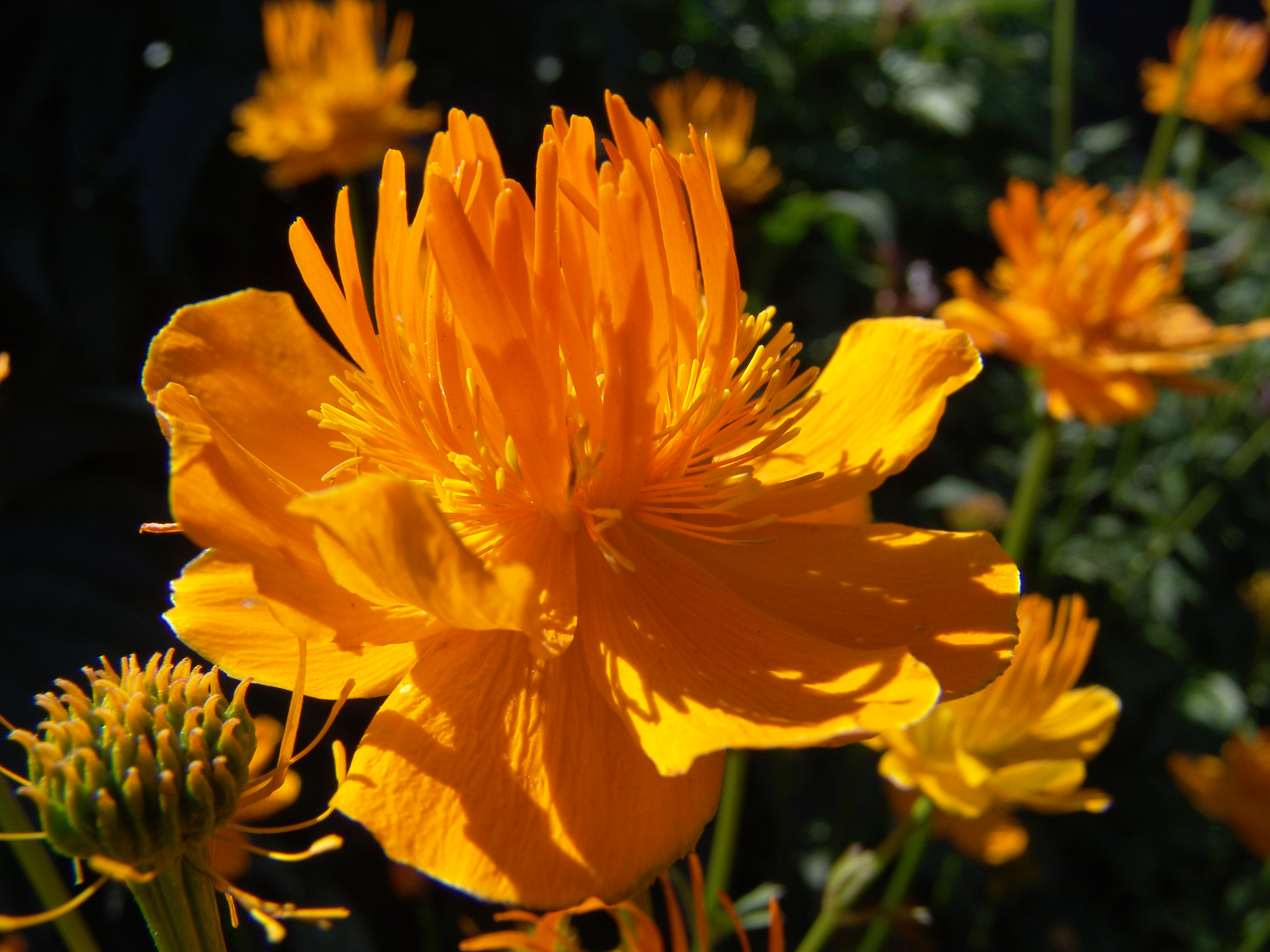
Trollius species

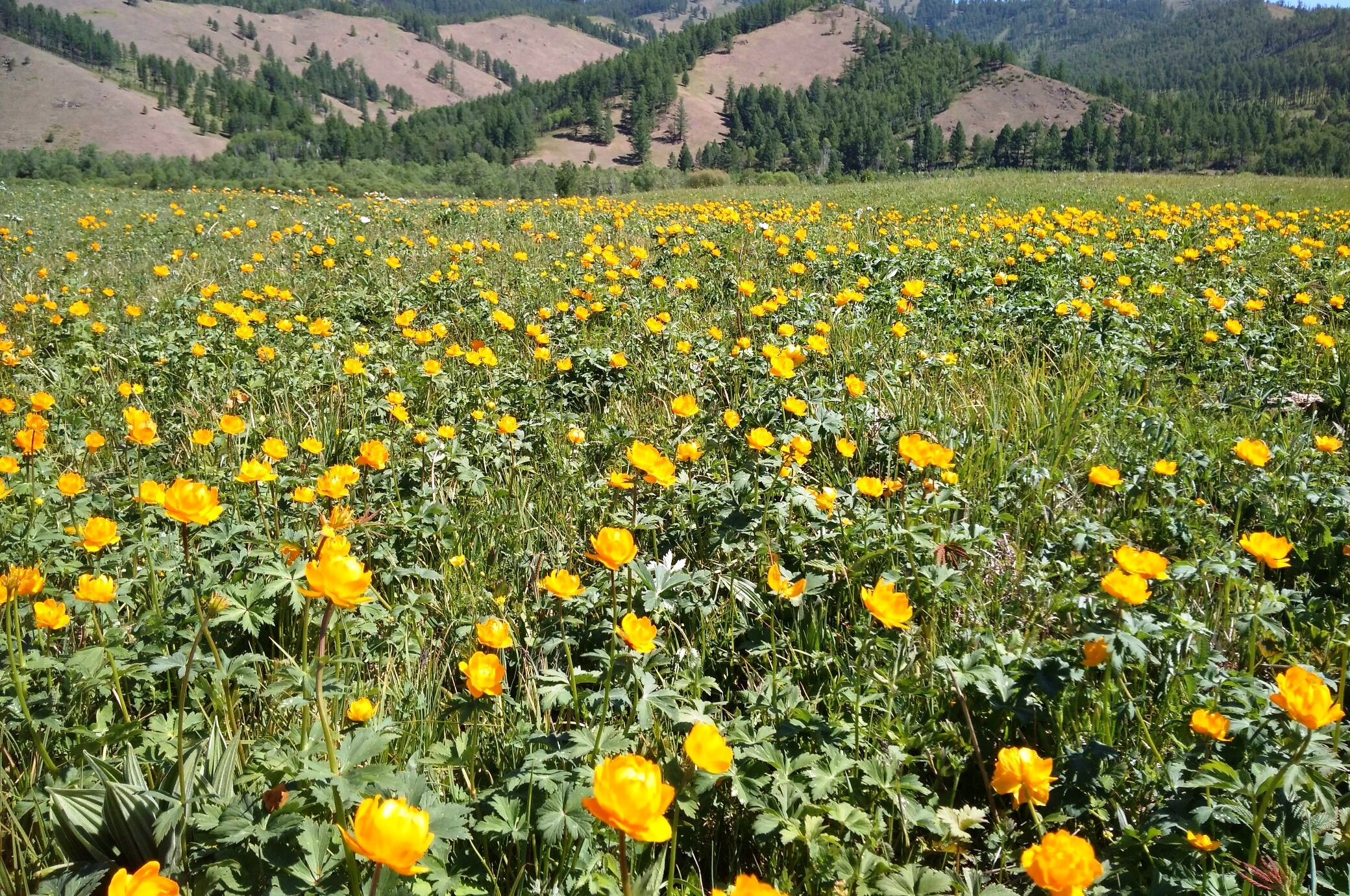
Trollius in the south-west of Buryatia, Russia

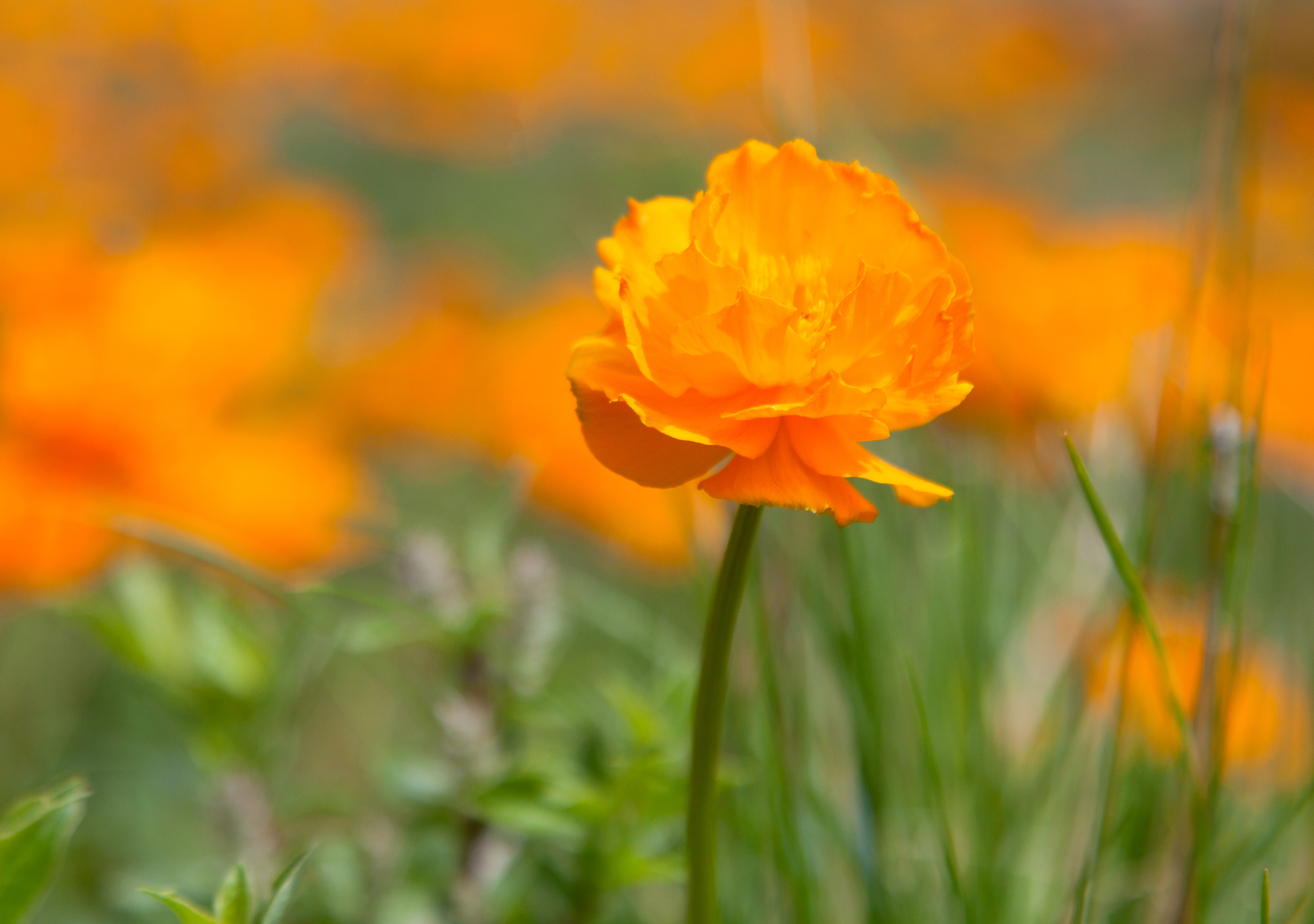
Mountain Altai

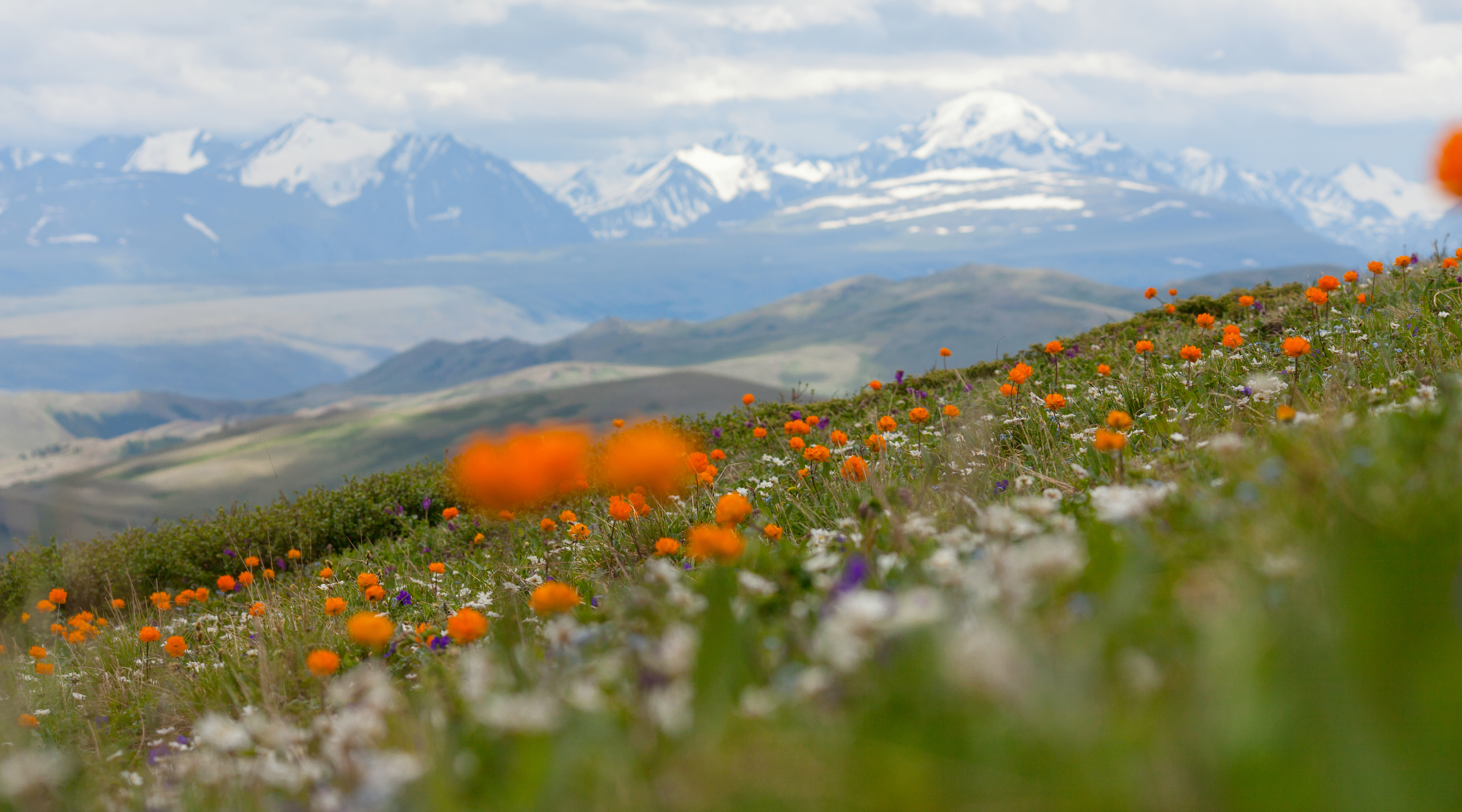
Mountain Altai
