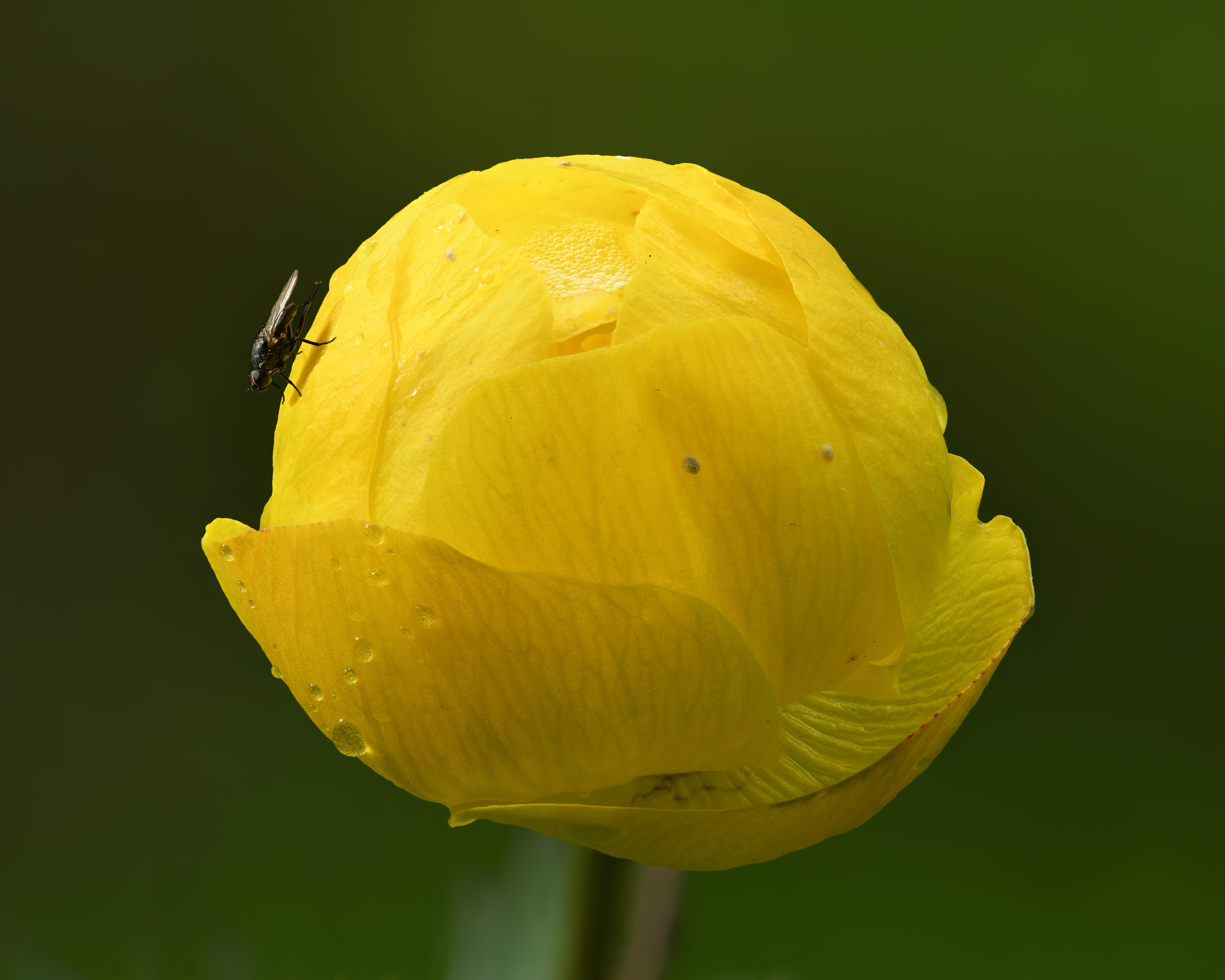

Scientific classification
- Kingdom: Plantae
- Clade: Embryophytes
- Clade: Tracheophytes
- Clade: Spermatophytes
- Clade: Angiosperms
- Clade: Eudicots
- Order: Ranunculales
- Family: Ranunculaceae
- Genus: Trollius
- Species: T. europaeus

Binomial name
- Trollius europaeus L.

= Trollius europaeus =

Species of flowering plant in the buttercup family

Trollius europaeus, the globeflower, is a perennial flowering plant of the family Ranunculaceae. The plant is native to Europe and Western Asia and is a protected species in Russia and Bulgaria.

In Udmurtia, this plant is one of the national symbols of the republic, with many different objects named after it.

== Description ==
Trollius europaeus grows up to 60 cm (24 in) high with a bright yellow, globe-shaped flower up to 3 cm (1.2 in) across. The colourful petaloid sepals hide 5–15 inconspicuous true petals with nectaries at their base and, typically for the family, a large number of stamens. Each flower produces a large number of wrinkled follicles. The leaves are deeply divided into 3–5 toothed lobes.

It grows in damp ground in shady areas, woodland and scrub, flowering between June and August.

This species is pollinated mostly by seed-eating flies belonging to the genus Chiastocheta (Anthomyiidae).

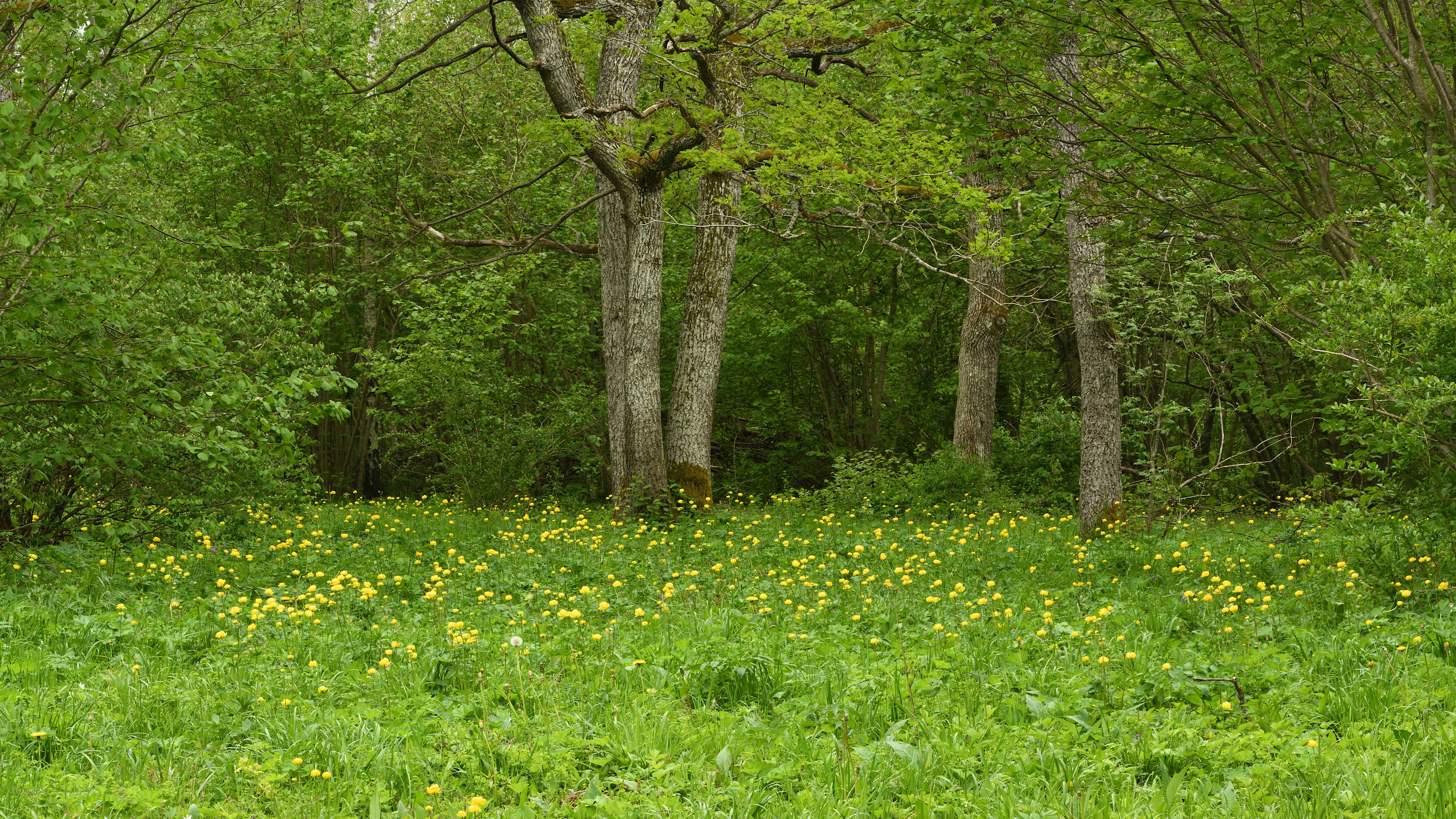
Habitat

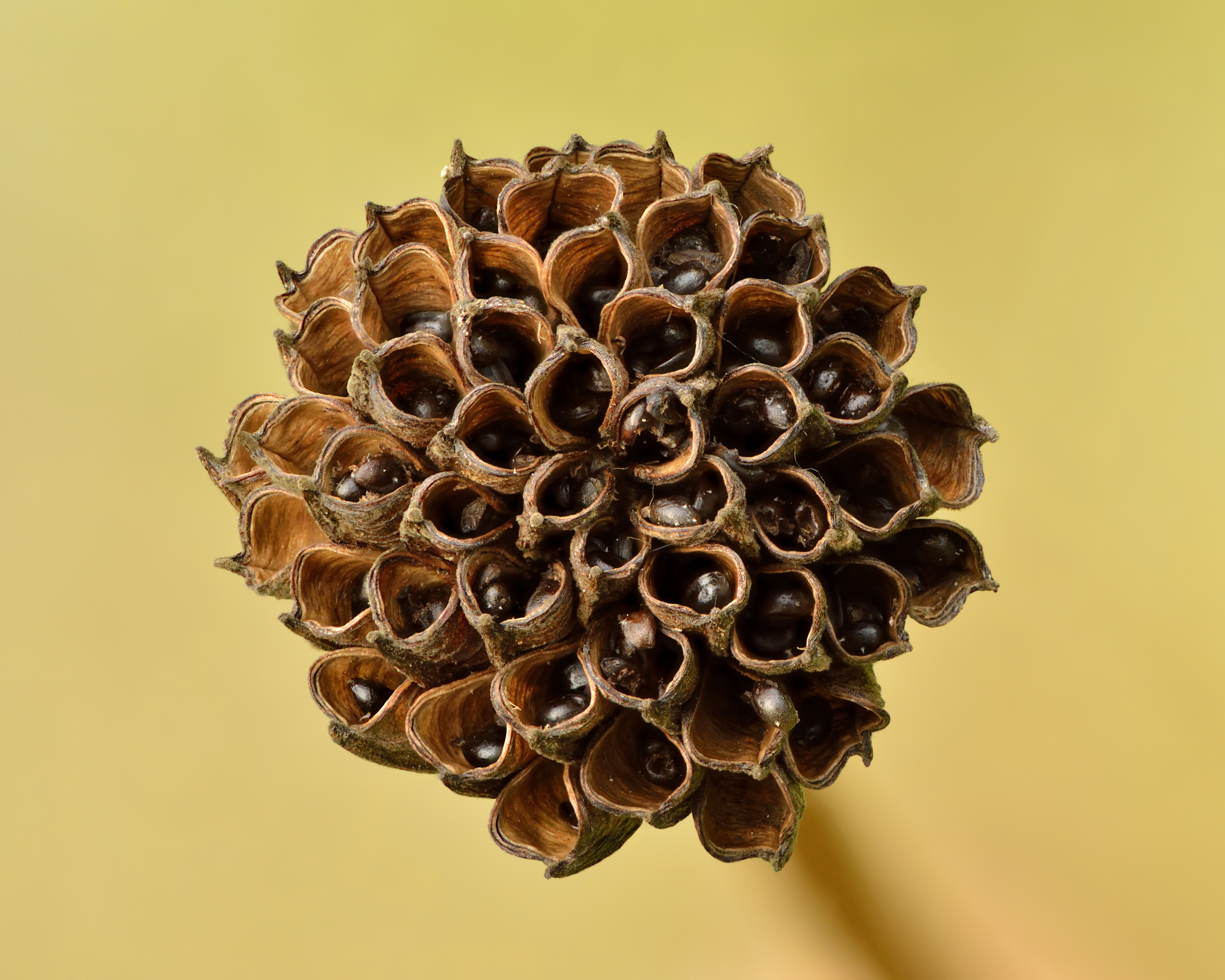
Seed head
