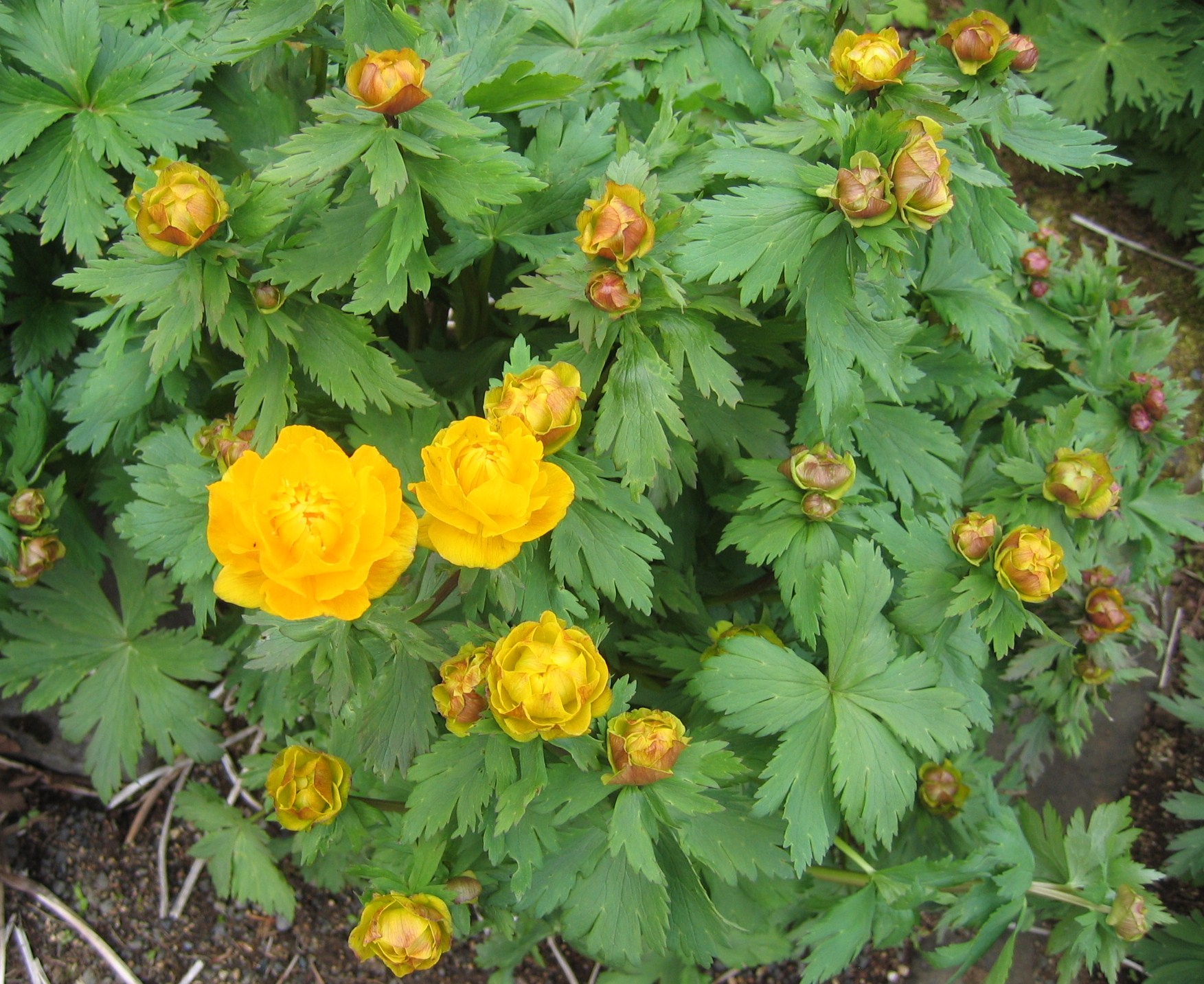

Scientific classification
- Kingdom: Plantae
- Clade: Tracheophytes
- Clade: Angiosperms
- Clade: Eudicots
- Order: Ranunculales
- Family: Ranunculaceae
- Genus: Trollius
- Species: T. asiaticus

Binomial name
- Trollius asiaticus L.

= Trollius asiaticus =

Asian globeflower

Species of flowering plant

Trollius asiaticus, the Asian globeflower, is a species of ornamental plant in the family Ranunculaceae, which is native to Asia and Europe. This plant usually grows in wet places, especially in grasslands and forests. It commonly grows to about 20 cm or higher.

Trollius asiaticus, exhibits considerable variability in the morphology of its flowers and leaves. The adaptability can be seen by subtle shifts in sepal lengths, petal widths and beak sizes.

Trollius asiaticus is considered to be a key ancestral specie as it acts a maternal form from which other species such as T. altaicus and T. sajanensis have evolved.

In high mountains and midlands, there is a variety of single plants. However, these cannot be referred to T. asiaticus , as they don't have the main diagnostic characteristic as their petals are considerably shorter. These forms were identified as T. vitalli, T. sajanesis and T. sibiricus which were found in the most eastern part of the Western Sayan and in the upper Naryn River.
