= Coleophora stramentella =

Scientific classification
- Kingdom: Animalia
- Phylum: Arthropoda
- Clade: Pancrustacea
- Class: Insecta
- Order: Lepidoptera
- Family: Coleophoridae
- Genus: Coleophora
- Species: C. stramentella

Binomial name
- Coleophora stramentella Zeller, 1849

Synonyms
- Coleophora podolensis Toll, 1938

Species of moth

Coleophora stramentella is a moth of the family Coleophoridae. It is found from the Czech Republic and Austria to Greece.

The larvae feed on Astragalus onobrychis.
