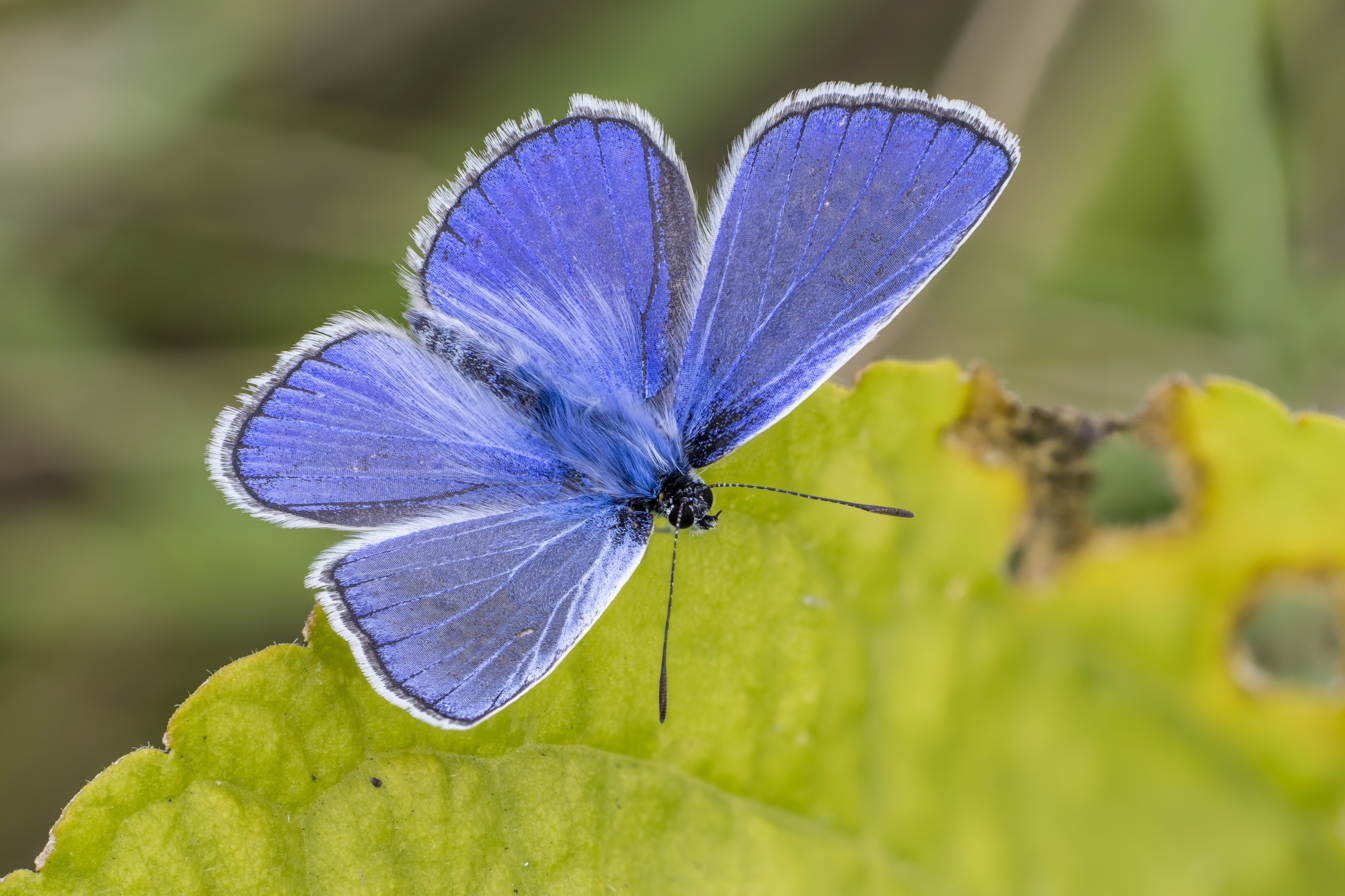
- Male, Turňa Castle, Slovakia
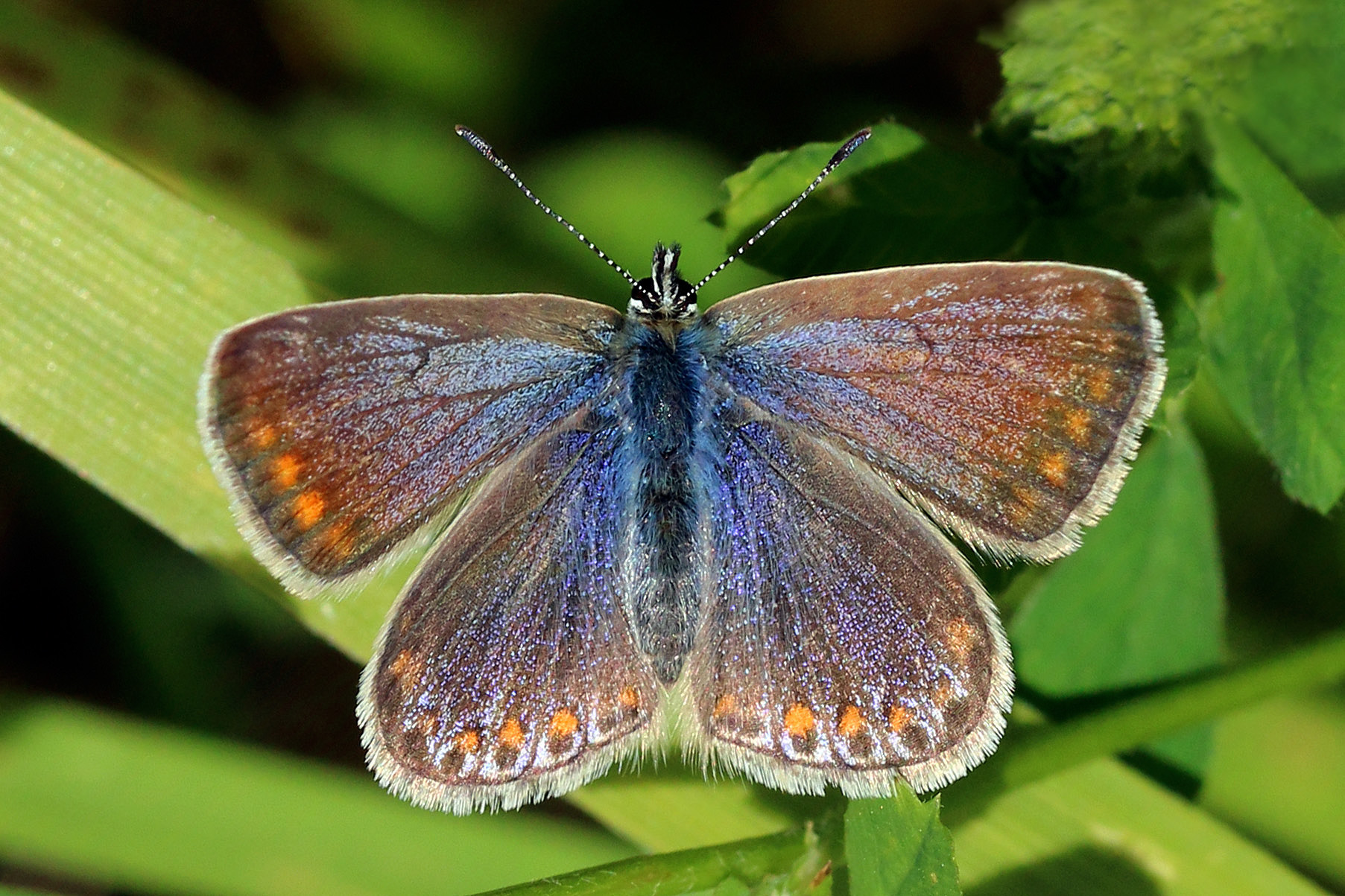
- Female, Oxfordshire, UK

Conservation status
- Least Concern (IUCN 3.1) (Europe)

- Least Concern (IUCN 3.1) (Mediterranean)

Scientific classification
- Kingdom: Animalia
- Phylum: Arthropoda
- Clade: Pancrustacea
- Class: Insecta
- Order: Lepidoptera
- Family: Lycaenidae
- Genus: Polyommatus
- Species: P. icarus

Binomial name
- Polyommatus icarus (Rottemburg, 1775)

Synonyms
- Lycaena icarus

= Common blue =

Species of butterfly

The common blue butterfly or European common blue (Polyommatus icarus) is a butterfly in the family Lycaenidae and subfamily Polyommatinae. The butterfly is found throughout the Palearctic and has been introduced to North America. Butterflies in the Polyommatinae are collectively called blues, from the coloring of the wings. Common blue males usually have wings that are blue above with a black-brown border and a white fringe. The females are usually brown above with a blue dusting and orange spots.

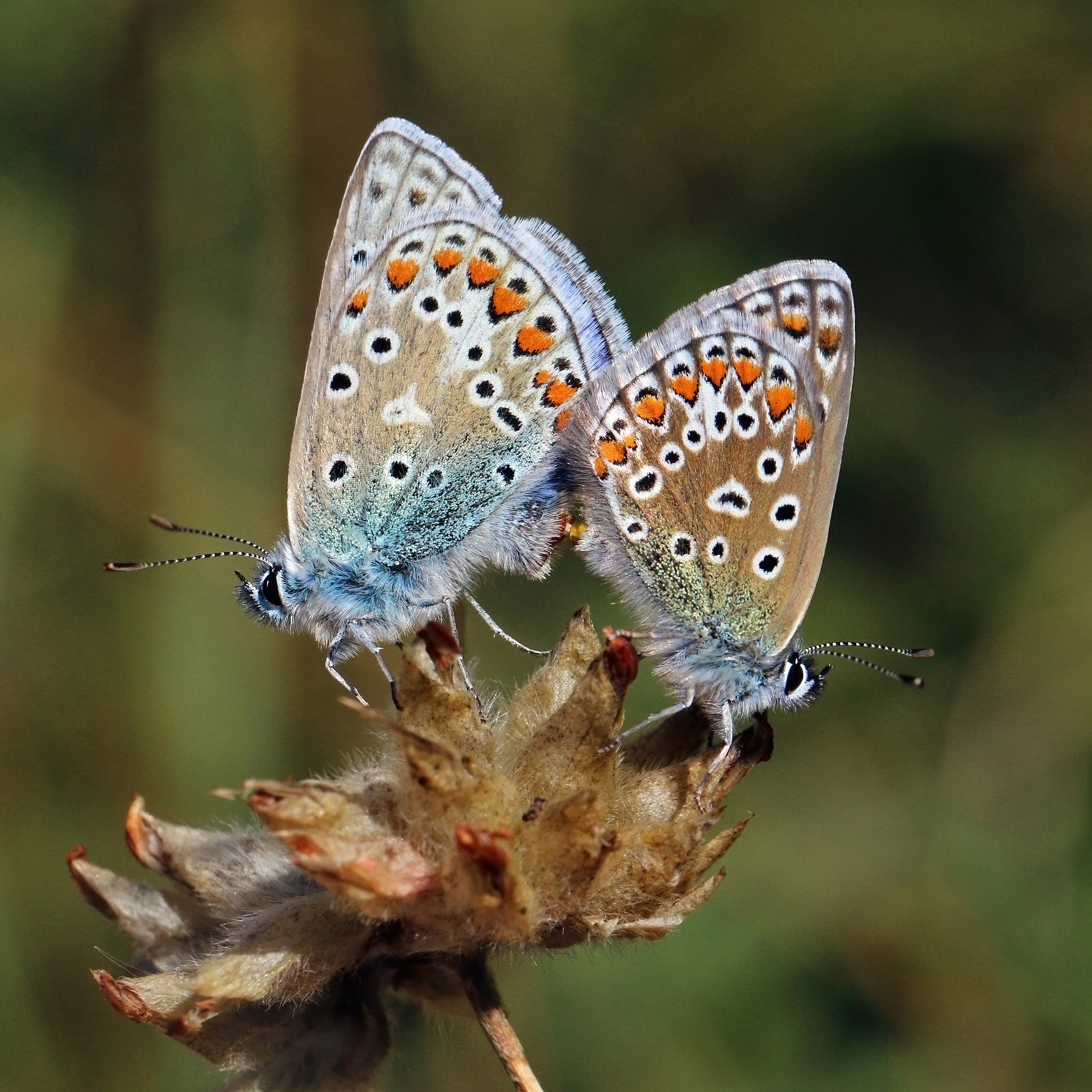
Mating in Buckinghamshire male left; female right

The Common blue was elected as the national butterfly of Israel in 2023. The contest was launched by the National Butterfly Lovers of Israel Association, with the participation of other nature organizations. A factor in the election result is that like Polyommatus icarus, the flag of Israel is blue and white.

== Taxonomy and phylogeny ==
This species was first described by Siegmund Adrian von Rottemburg in 1775. Vernacular names that have been given to P. icarus include little blew argus, blew argus, mixed argus, selvedg'd argus, ultramarine blue, caerulean butterfly, and alexis.

=== Subspecies ===
Possible Subspecies include:

- P. i. ammosovi (Kurenzov, 1970) Russia (Central Yakutia, Far East, Kamchatka)
- P. i. fugitiva (Butler, 1881) – Pakistan
- P. i. fuchsi (Sheljuzhko, 1928) – Russia (South Siberia, Transbaikalia)
- P. i. icarus (Rottemburg, 1775) – Europe, Caucasus, Transcaucasia
- P. i. mariscolore (Kane, 1893) – Europe (Ireland)
- P. i. napaea (Grum-Grshimailo, 1891) China, etc (Tian-Shan)
- P. i. omelkoi Dubatolov & Korshunov, 1995 Russia (Amur, Ussuri)
- P. i. zelleri Verity, 1919 – Southern Europe (inc. Italy - sicily)

Possible forms:

- P. i. f. boalensis Verhulst & Verhulst in 1985
- P. i. f. icarinus (Scriba, 1791)
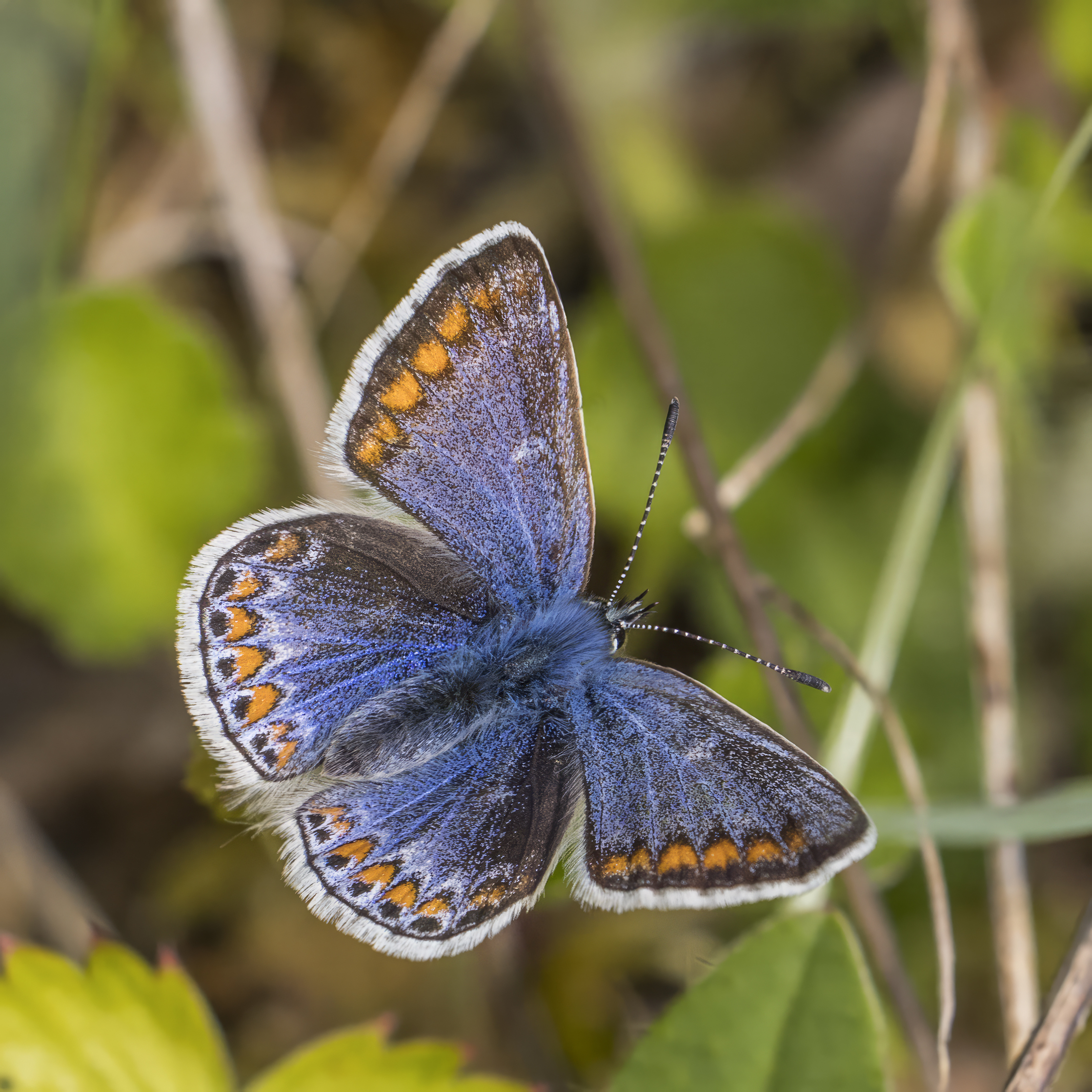
female P. i. mariscolore, County Clare, Ireland

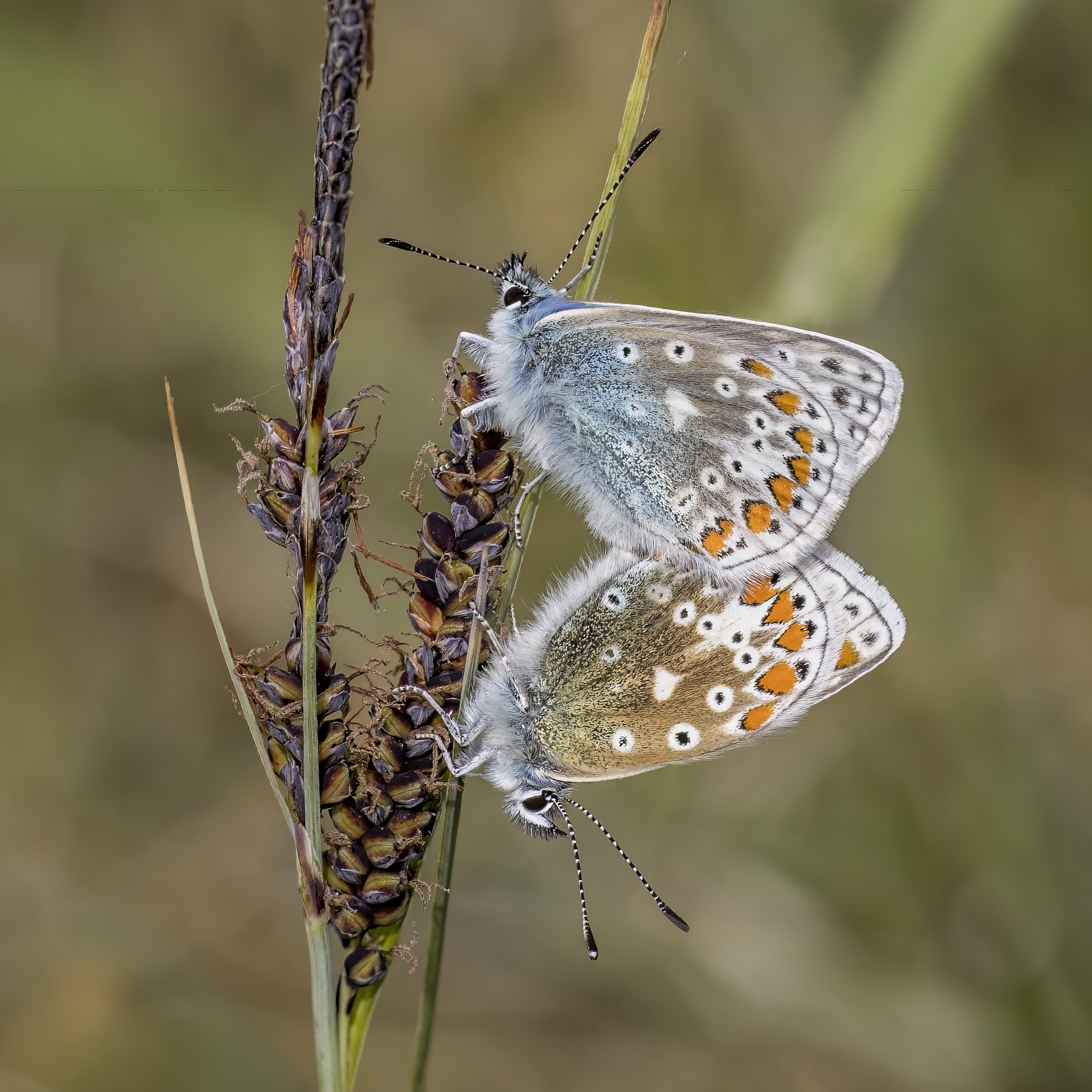
mating P. i. mariscolore, County Clare, Ireland

== Description ==
Polyommatus icarus has a wingspan of 28–36 millimetres (1.1–1.4 in). The dorsal side of male wings is an iridescent lilac blue, bright violet-blue, or almost hyacinth-blue with a thin black border. Females' wings are brown or black-brown with a row of reddish orange, white, and black lunules along the edges of the wings (marginal spots) and some variable amount of blue extending from the base of the wings. The extent of blue and brown is extremely variable depending on location and ambient temperature during development. The top of the wings in the female may be mostly blue, especially in Ireland and Scotland, but it always features red spots not found in males.

The ventral side has a greyish or dust-grey base color in the males and a more brownish hue in the females. Both sexes have a row of red or orange spots along the edge of the hindwing and extending onto the forewing, though they are generally fainter there, particularly in the males, where they are sometimes missing altogether. There are about a dozen black-centered white spots (ocelli) on the hindwing and nine on the forewing. These usually include one in the middle of the forewing cell, absent in Chapman's and Escher's blues. The fringes on the outer edge of the wings are uniform white, not crossed with black lines as in the chalkhill and Adonis blues (that is, the common blue lacks checkering).

Other similar species are:-

- Polyommatus semiargus
- Polyommatus coridon
- Polyommatus dorylas
- Polyommatus amandus
- Polyommatus damon
- Polyommatus celina

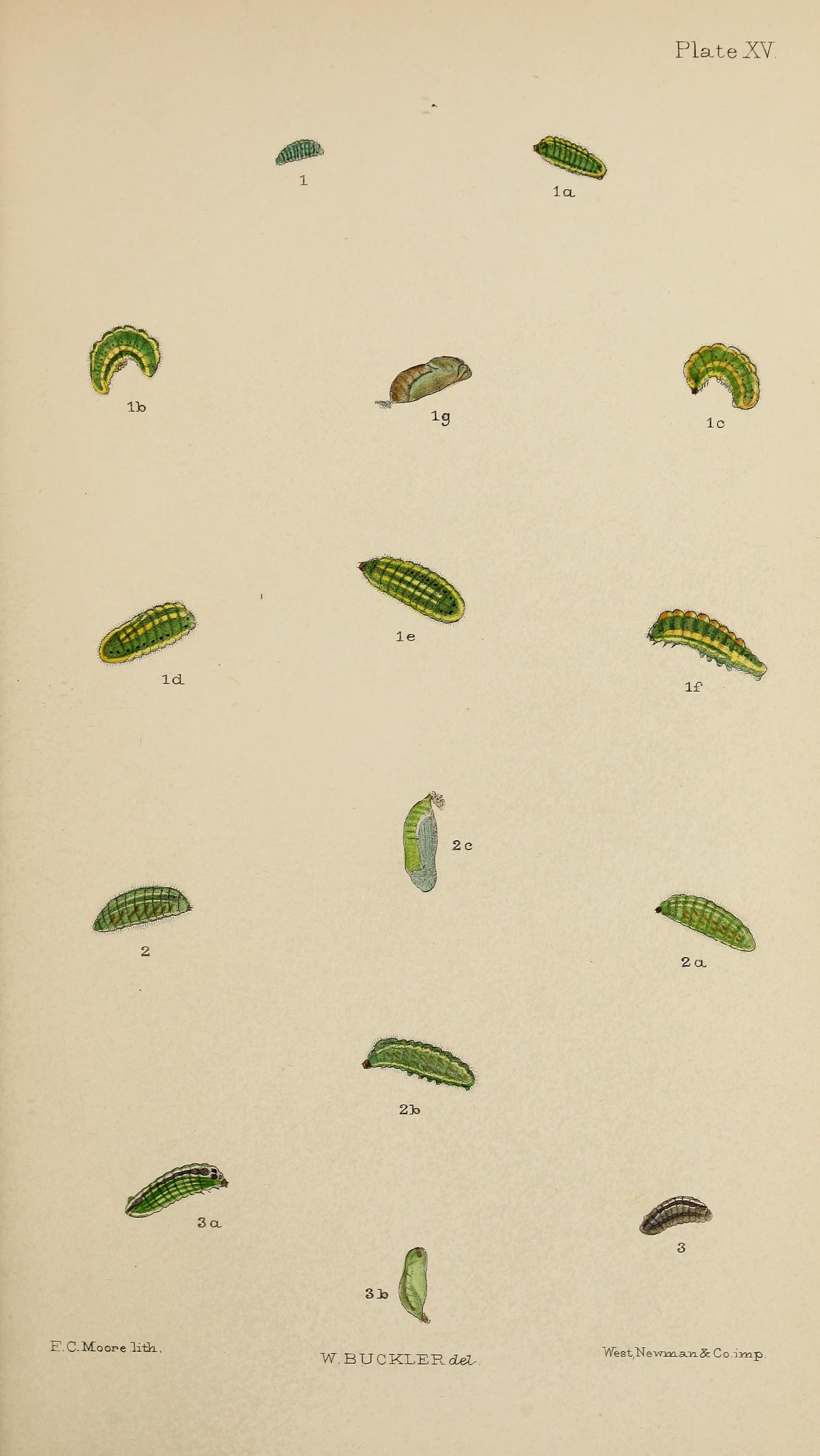
Figs Figs 2, 2a, 2b larva after last moult 2c pupa

The caterpillar is small, pale green with yellow stripes and, as usual with Lycaenid larvae, rather slug-like.

== Geographic range ==
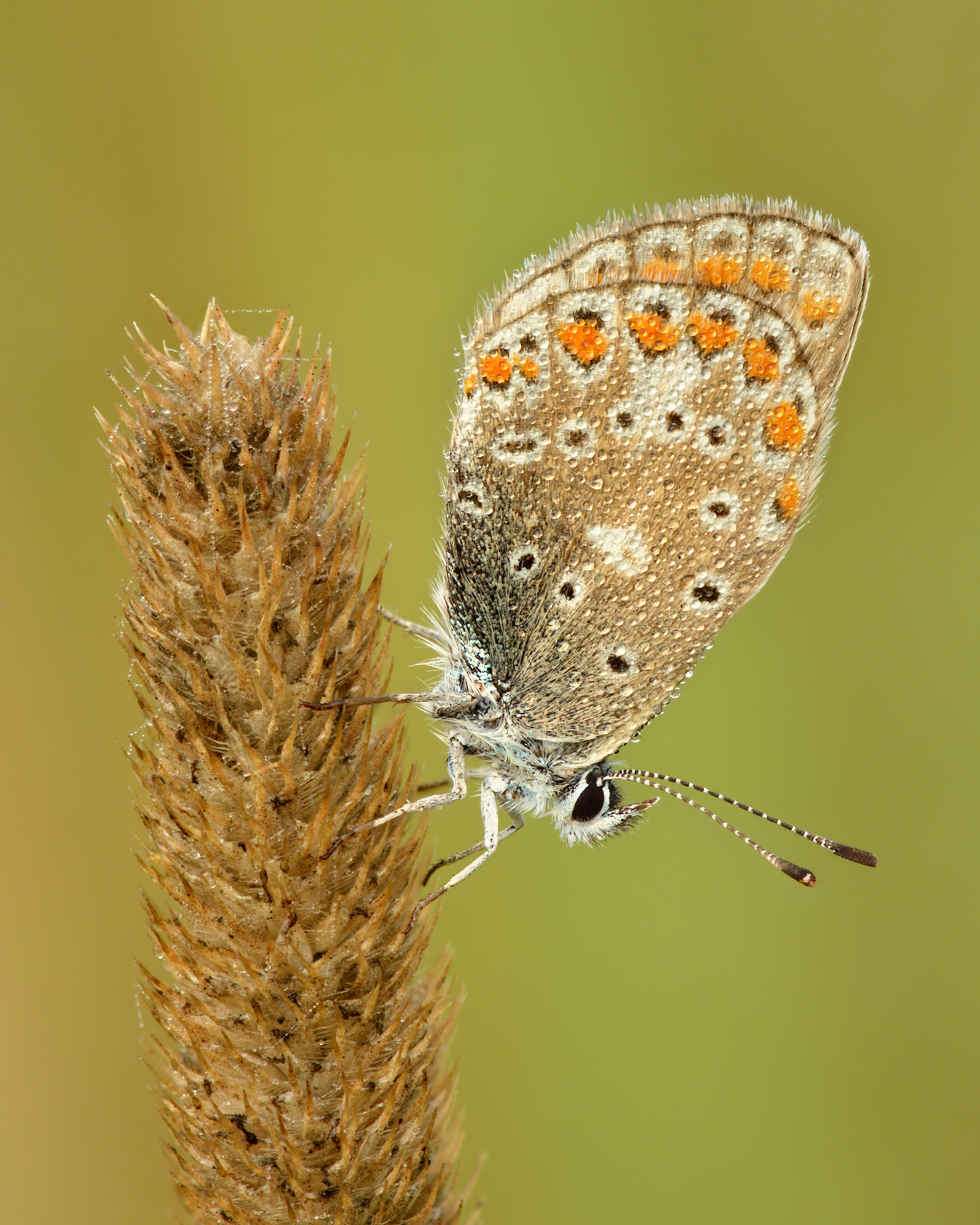
Underside

The common blue butterfly is found in Europe, North Africa, the Canary Islands, and east across the Palearctic to Northern China. Recently it was discovered in Quebec, Canada. It is widespread in the British Isles. Its distribution trend shows a 15% decline since the 1970s.

=== U.K. and Ireland ===
The common blue is Britain and Ireland's (and probably Europe's) most common and most widespread blue. It is found as far north as Orkney and on most of the Outer Hebrides. A range of grassland habitats are used: meadows, coastal dunes, woodland clearings, and also many man-made habitats, anywhere their food plants are found. In spite of its ubiquitousness in the British Isles, it does not exist in the Shetland Islands.

=== North America ===
This is a recently introduced species in eastern Canada. It was discovered in Mirabel, Quebec, Canada, by Ara Sarafian, an amateur entomologist who observed the butterfly from 2005 to 2008. He contacted the Canadian National Collection of Insects in Ottawa where the butterfly was identified as Polyommatus icarus, a newly introduced butterfly to Canada and to North America. The butterfly seems to be well established and is extending its range from year to year. A study from Montreal, Quebec, Canada showed that the common blue is most abundant in areas with greater urban land cover and where their preferred larval host plant, bird's foot trefoil (Lotus corniculatus), can be found.

== Habitat ==
These butterflies inhabit flowery or grassy places, warm and cool, open or wooded areas and at all altitudes up to high alpine meadows at an elevation of 0–2,700 m (0–9,000 ft) above sea level. It mostly resides on chalk or limestone grassland, but also in smaller numbers in woodland clearings, meadows, heathlands, sand dunes, along railway embankments, and under cliffs.

=== Source of decline ===
Previously, P. icarus was a very common species that occupied Europe and Asia, and was one of the most widely distributed butterflies in Britain. It is known to be tolerant of many habitats, including a wide range of grasslands. There has been an estimated 74% loss of the butterfly population since 1901. This could be because 46% of the total land area covered by the butterfly's preferred host plant, Lotus corniculatus, has also been lost since 1901. This host plant is a favored plant for two reasons: it provides adult nutrition, as well as food for the larva after it hatches.

== Food resources ==
=== Larval food plants ===
The larvae feed on plants from the bean family, Leguminosae. Recorded food plants are Lathyrus species, Vicia species, Vicia cracca, Oxytropis campestris, bird's foot trefoil (Lotus corniculatus), Oxytropis pyrenaica, Astragalus aristatus, Astragalus onobrychis, Astragalus pinetorum, Medicago sativa, black medick (Medicago lupulina), Medicago romanica, Medicago falcata, Melilotus officinalis, common restharrow (Ononis repens), wild thyme Thymus serpyllum, lesser trefoil (Trifolium dubium), Trifolium pratense and white clover (Trifolium repens). In laboratory experiments, caterpillars achieved highest weights and relative growth rates when fed the flowers of L. corniculatus, M. sativa, and M. officinalis, compared to those only provided foliage or an artificial diet.

=== Flavonoids ===
Common blues sequester flavonoids from their host plants and allocate these pigments that are UV-absorbing into their wings. These flavonoid pigments in females attract males. Males who patrol areas of suitable habitats while searching for virgin females stop and inspect females who have flavonoid pigments in them. This may be because flavonoid pigments that have UV absorption increase color saturation on females and allow females to be more conspicuous. There are also some other advantages of sequestering flavonoids, including the protection of eggs from adverse UV chemical reactions, as the butterflies will absorb the UV rays, and the flavonoids can offer a chemical defense against predators or pathogens.

Flavonoid sequestration is much more effective when coming from natural host plants than from experimentally offered diets. Females sequester about 60% more flavonoids than do males. This richness in females may increase visibility, but could also confer information about feeding history, and consequentially the quality of potential mate. Flavonoid sequestration is an important component of intraspecific visual communication and sexual signaling in Polyommatus butterflies.

== Parental care ==
=== Oviposition ===
During oviposition, females must locate a potential host plant and evaluate its suitability as the host plant for oviposition. P. icarus uses visual cues to conduct this task. Females use several plants in the family Fabaceae as larval host plants, many which could also potentially function as nectar sources. P. icarus prefers plants with flowers over plants without, and prefers to oviposit near the flowers.

== Life cycle ==
As a caterpillar, the common blue consumes foliage and flowers of the host plant on which it was lain. As an adult butterfly, it feeds on wildflower nectar and will seek scarce nutrients (e.g. salts) typically in large vertebrate excrement. The adult lives 2-3 weeks.

Males are often very obvious as they defend territories against rivals and seek out the more reclusive females. In the south of Britain there are two broods a year, flying in May and June and again in August and September. Northern England has one brood, flying between June and September. In a year with a long warm season, there is sometimes a partial third brood in the south flying into October. Similarly, populations in Northern Sweden are univoltine whereas southern populations are bivoltine, occasionally with a partial third generation flying in late August.

=== Eggs ===
The egg stage lasts for around eight days. The eggs are white and shaped like flattened spheres. The eggs are very small, about 0.60 millimetres (1/32 in). The ground color of the egg sac is pale-greenish grey, with the actual arrangement being white. Eggs are laid singly on young shoots of the food plant.

=== Larvae ===
The larvae emerge around a week or two after eggs are laid. The larvae of P. icarus feed on the underside of leaves, causing blotching. Hibernation occurs as a late instar larvae. As is true of most Lycaenids, common blue larvae exhibit facultative myrmecophily. They are attractive to ants of genera Myrmica, Lasius, Formica, Plagiolepis, but not as much as some other species of blues. The chrysalis is olive green/brown and formed on the ground, where it is attended by ants of genera Myrmica, Lasius, Formica, Plagiolepis, which will often take it into their nests. The larva creates a substance called honeydew, which the ants eat while the butterfly lives in the ant hill. The relationship between these ants and blue common larvae is described to be facultatively mutualistic. As the production of honeydew for ant appeasement is costly, the strength of myrmecophilous association depends heavily on larval diet quality/water content as well as predation risk from which the ants provide protection.

==== Instars of larvae ====
There are five instars of larvae. During the first instar, larva emerge and eat away the crown of the egg. The segments of the larvae are large and rounded, and the following segments are smaller. The body is a light green, and is whitish in light. This stage lasts about nine days. The second instar, after the first moult, adds a couple of body segments onto the larvae, and the body is more green. The third instar signifies more feeding and growing in size of the larvae. They are about 3.2 millimetres (0.13 in) long and the head and legs are black colored. In the fourth and fifth instar, the larvae becomes very green, has ten body segments, and measures about 13 millimetres (0.51 in) in length.

==== External effects on larval growth and development ====
Larval growth rates are thought to be determined mainly by temperature and food quality and availability. The larvae of P. icarus are oligophagous, meaning they utilize a range of host plants in the family Fabaceae, as well as have a mutualistic relationship with ants. For both male and female larvae, the total development time is longer with longer day lengths, corresponding to earlier times in the season. When larvae are born earlier in the season, they take a longer time to develop. When they are born later, they take a shorter time to develop. Thus the external effect of photoperiod affects the length of development for the larvae.

=== Pupae ===
Pupation, a stage that lasts about two weeks, occurs under silk strands at the base of the food plant. The chrysalis is olive green/brown and formed on the ground, where it is attended by ants. Ants may aid in protecting the pupa and may bury it to protect it from predators.

=== Adults ===
The male, with distinctive bright blue dorsal wing color, is more conspicuous than the female, which has browner dorsal wing color with some varying blue color. Males fly farther distances in search of territories that have fertile females. Females fly lower and search for nectar and places to lay her eggs. Wing span ranges from 29–36 millimetres (1.1–1.4 in). When the sexes meet, copulation occurs immediately, usually without any courtship ritual.

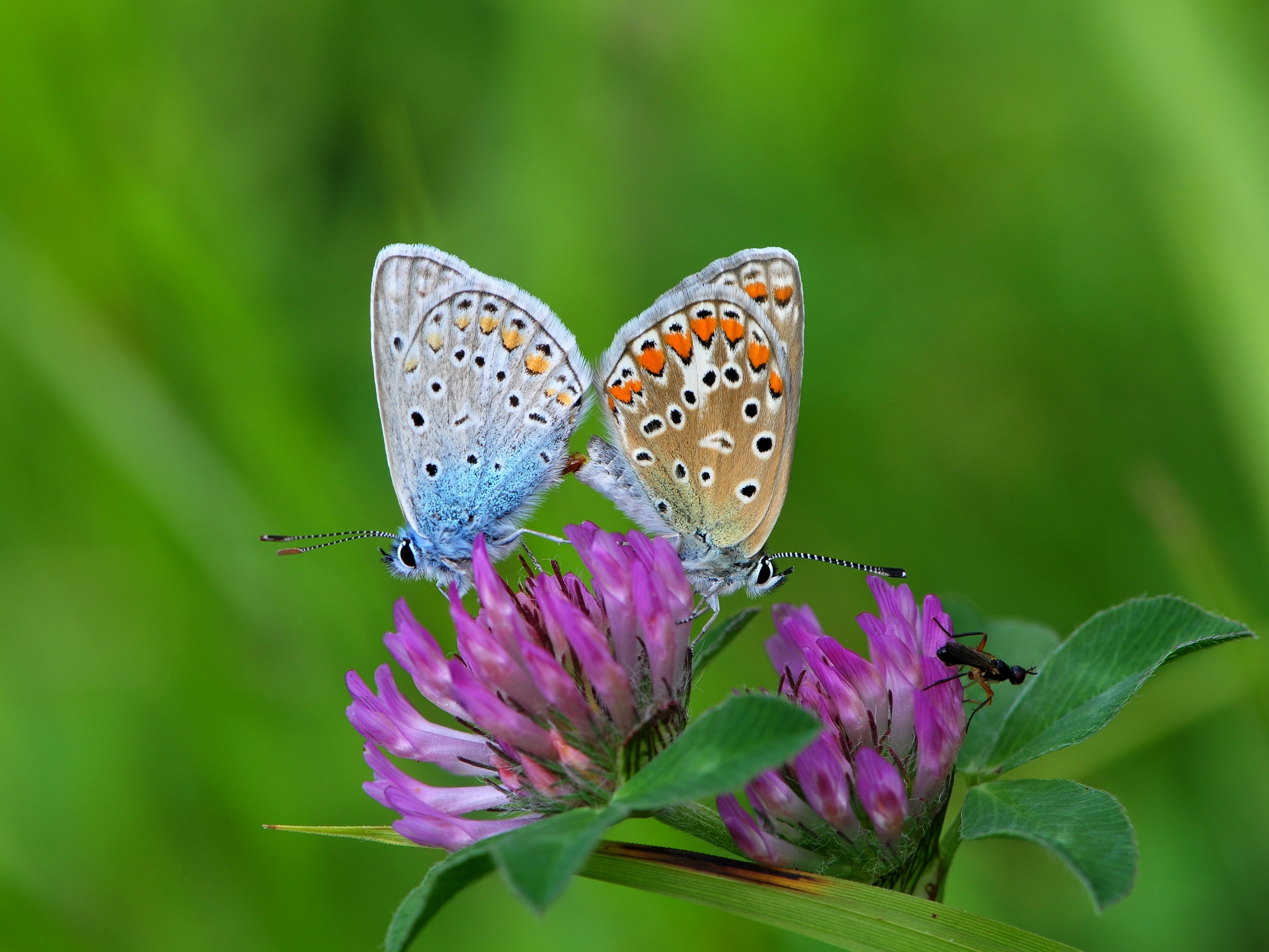
Mating

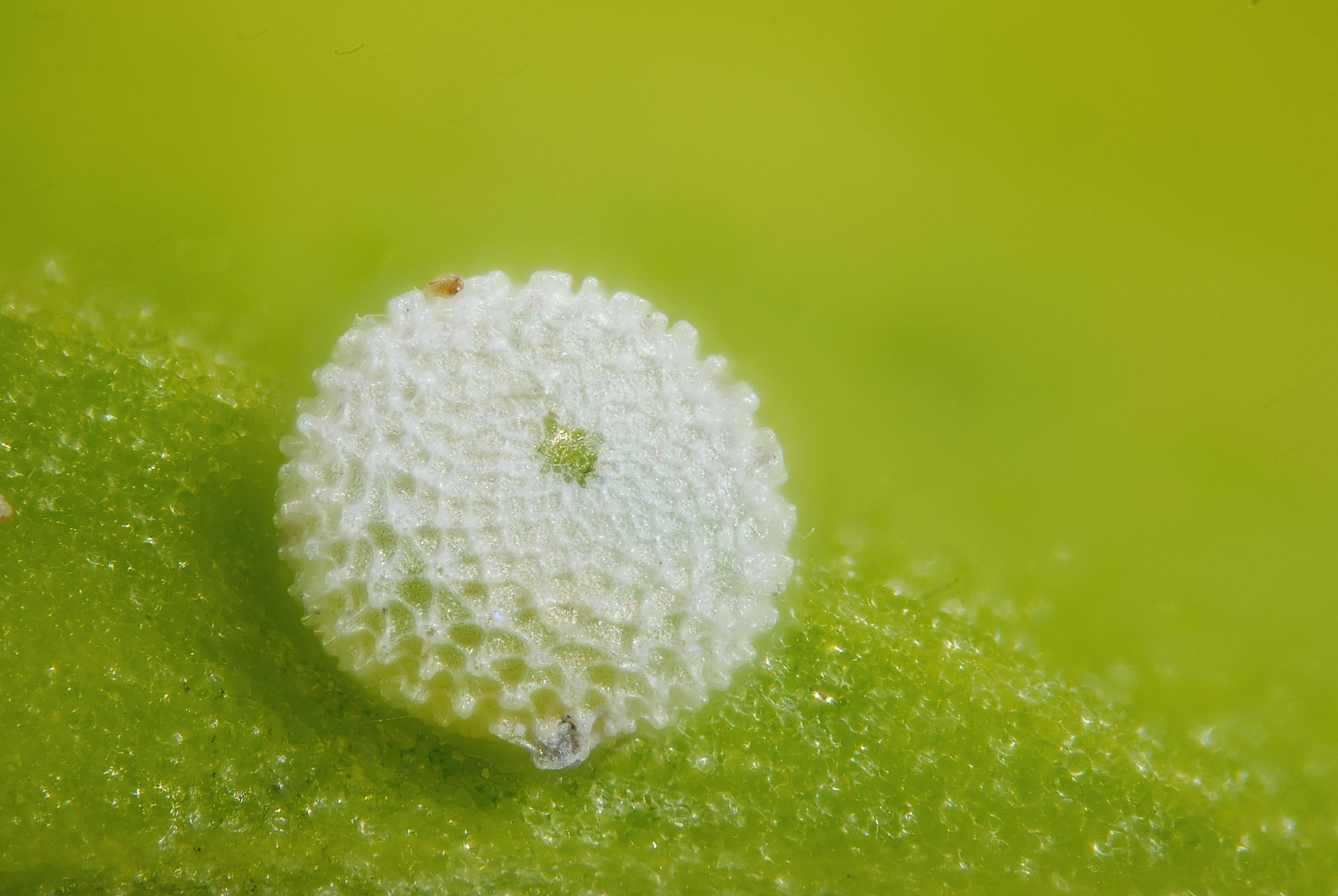
Egg

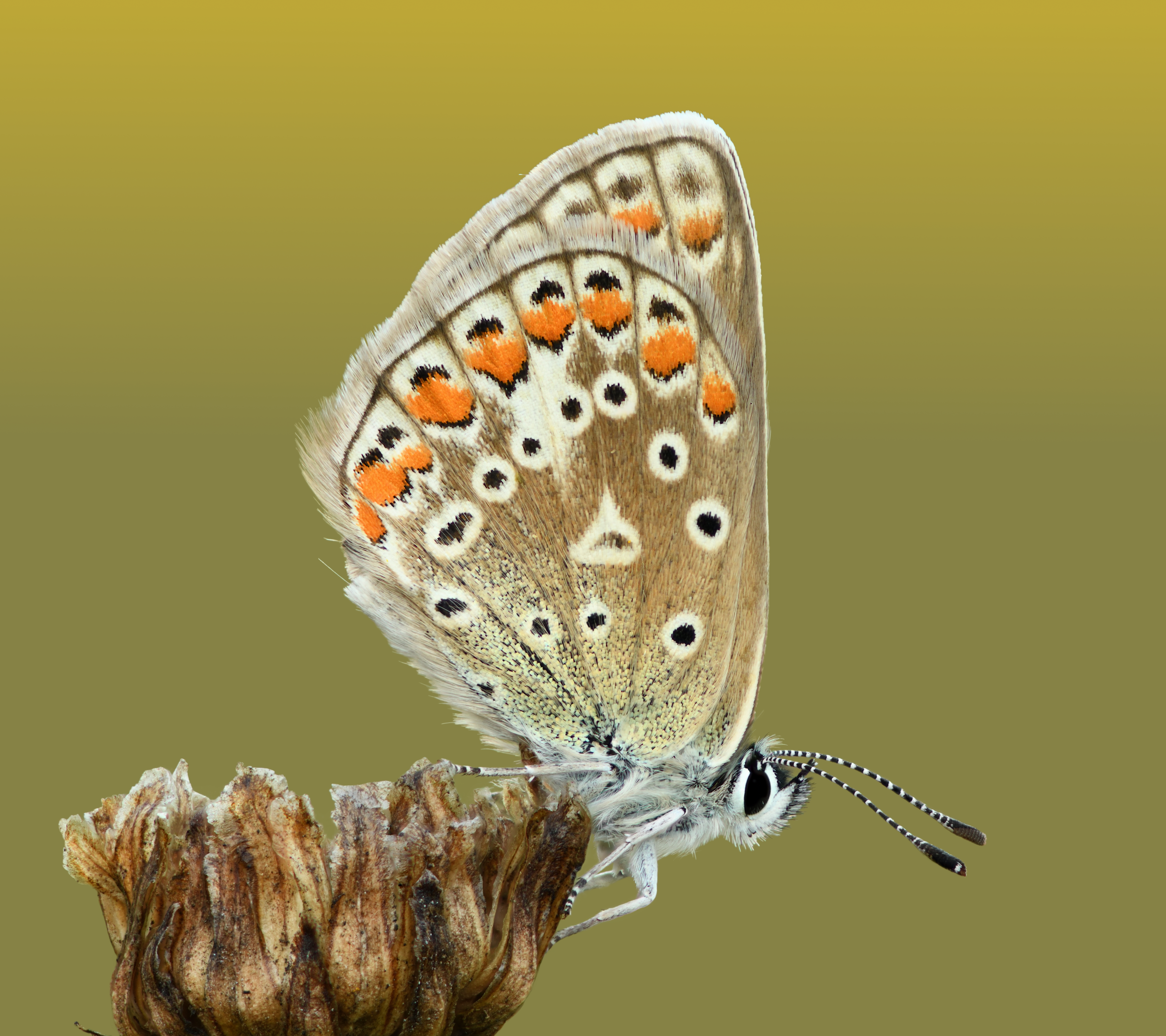
Female

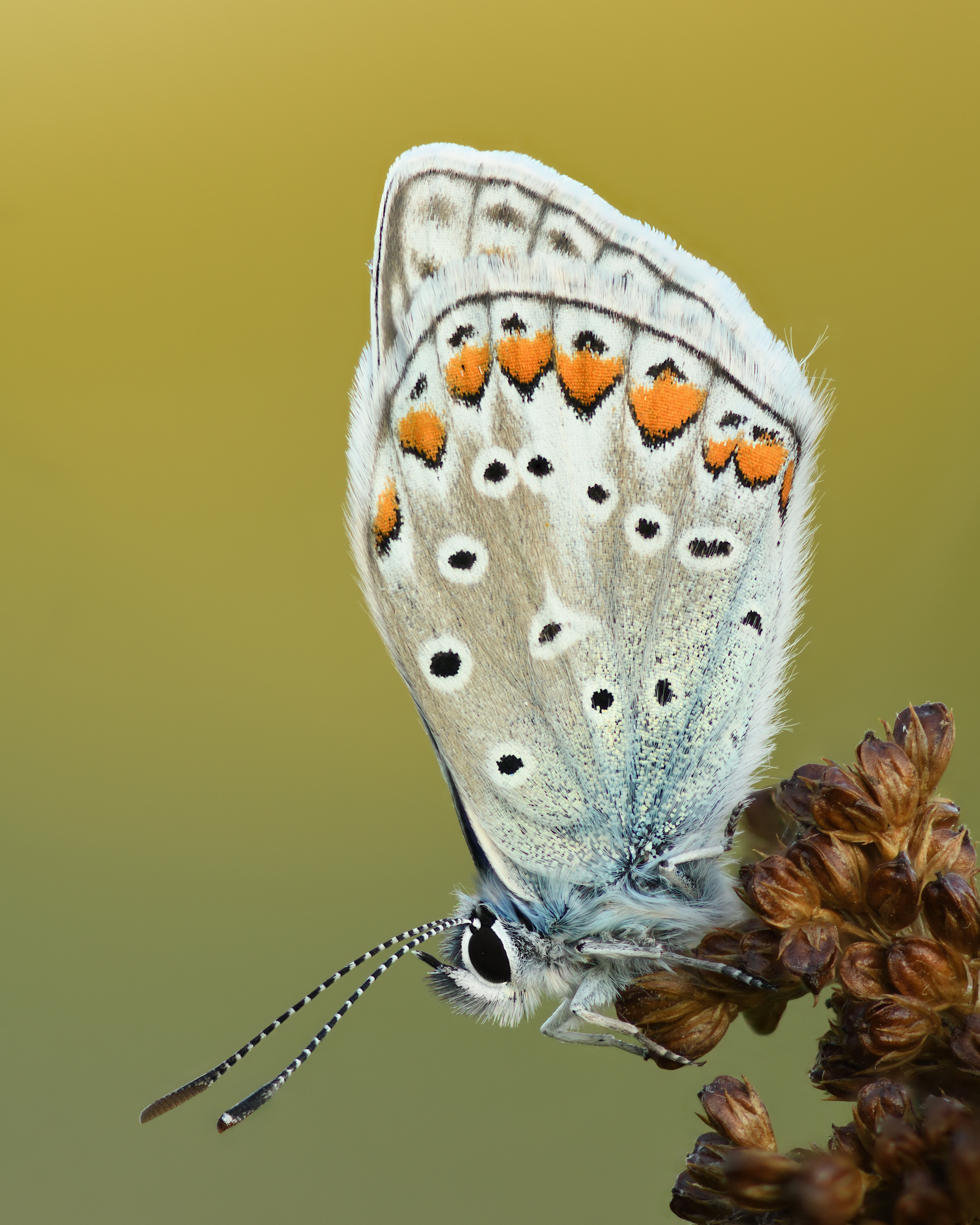
Male

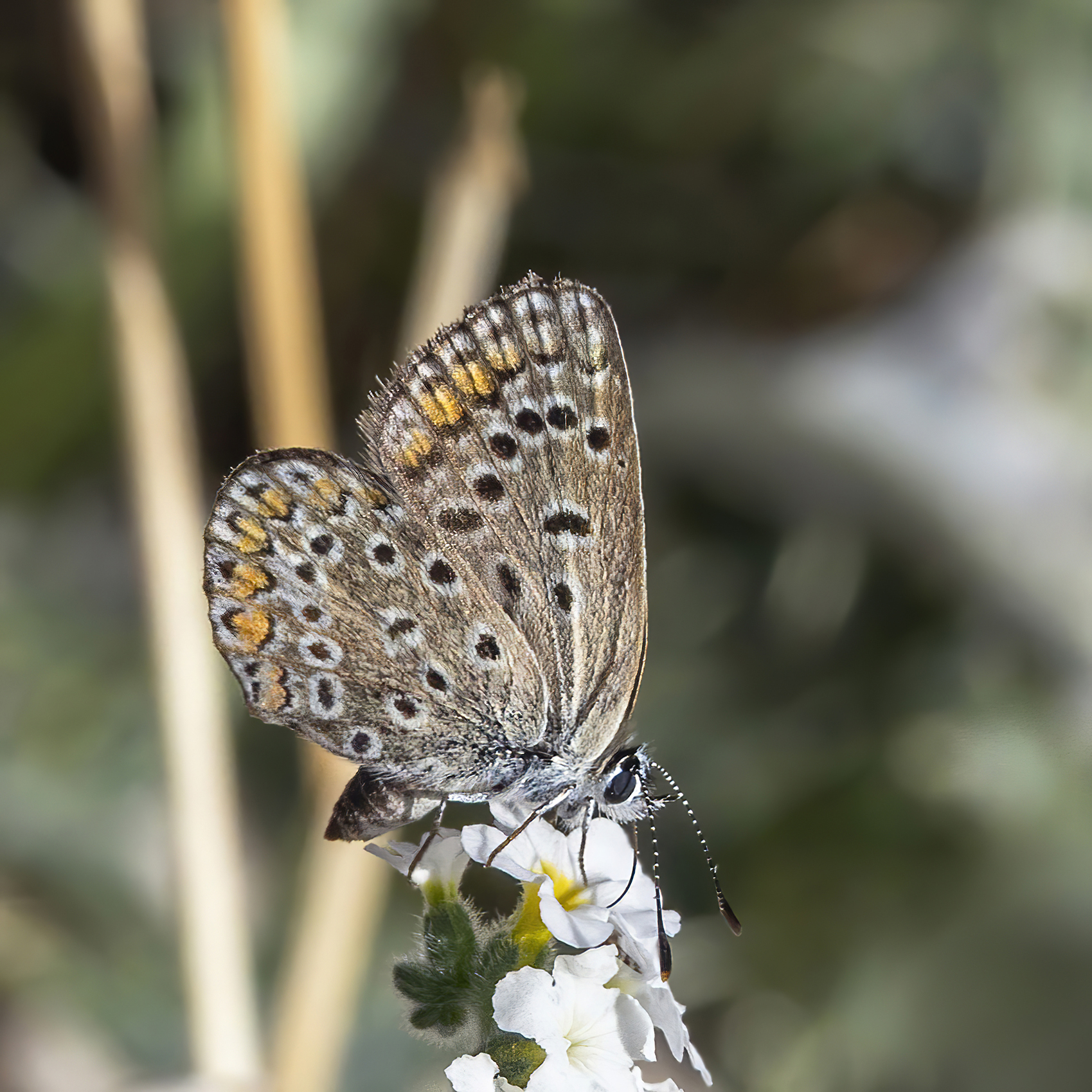
Female ab. Grisescens

== Physiology ==
=== Vision ===
Visual systems in butterflies are highly diverse and their color vision abilities have only begun to be explored. To see color, P. icarus uses a duplicated blue opsin in conjunction with its long-wavelength opsin LWRh. This enables the common blue to see color in the green part of the light spectrum extending up to 560 nm (2.2×10^{−5} in). There is also a difference between the dorsal and ventral eye-shine of P. icarus, with the dorsal retina dominated by yellow-reflecting ommatidia and the ventral exhibiting yellow and red-reflecting ommatidia. P. icarus is able to use color vision and distinguish between yellow of 590 nm (2.3×10^{−5} in) and blue of 430 nm (1.7×10^{−5} in), but is not able to distinguish between yellow and red of 640 nm.

=== Phenotypic plasticity of wing color ===
Dorsal color in both sexes exhibits thermal plasticity but it is most pronounced in females, where colder temperatures during development result in bluer adults. The blueness of blue scales is a structural color, arising from chitinous bubble-like nanostructures, whereas brown scales are melanistic pigment-based with a distinct spiky nanoarchitecture. The degree of female blueness and sensitivity to temperature have some genetic component, as some populations (especially in Northern Europe) have bluer females or starker seasonal polyphenism, where the spring generation is much bluer than the browner summer generation. By comparison, Central and Eastern European populations are very brown with a lesser degree of variation.

== Etymology ==
Named in the Classical tradition. In Greek mythology, Icarus was the son of the master craftsman Daedalus, the architect of the labyrinth of Crete.

== See also ==
- Butterflies of Asia
- Butterflies of Europe
- List of butterflies of Great Britain
