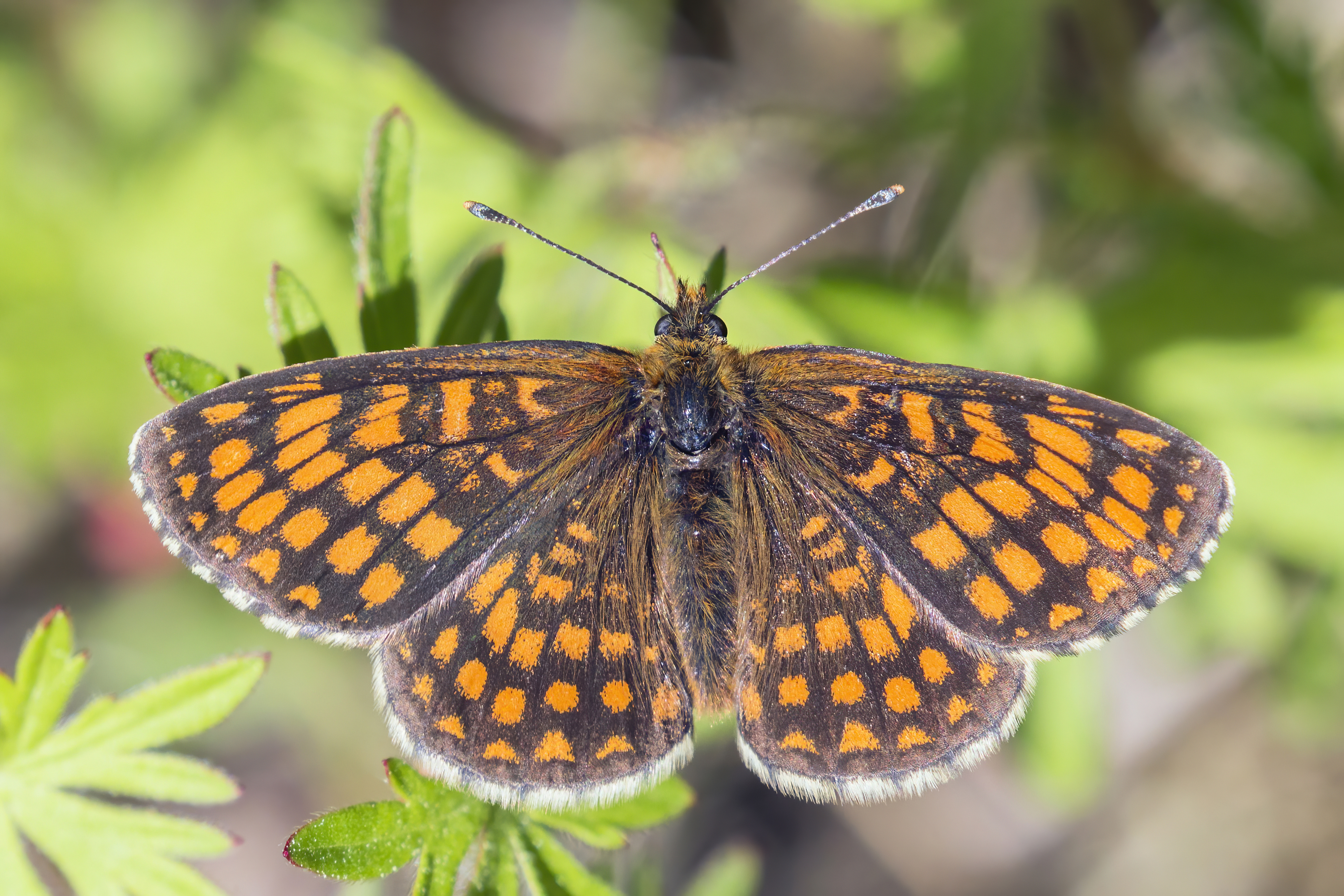

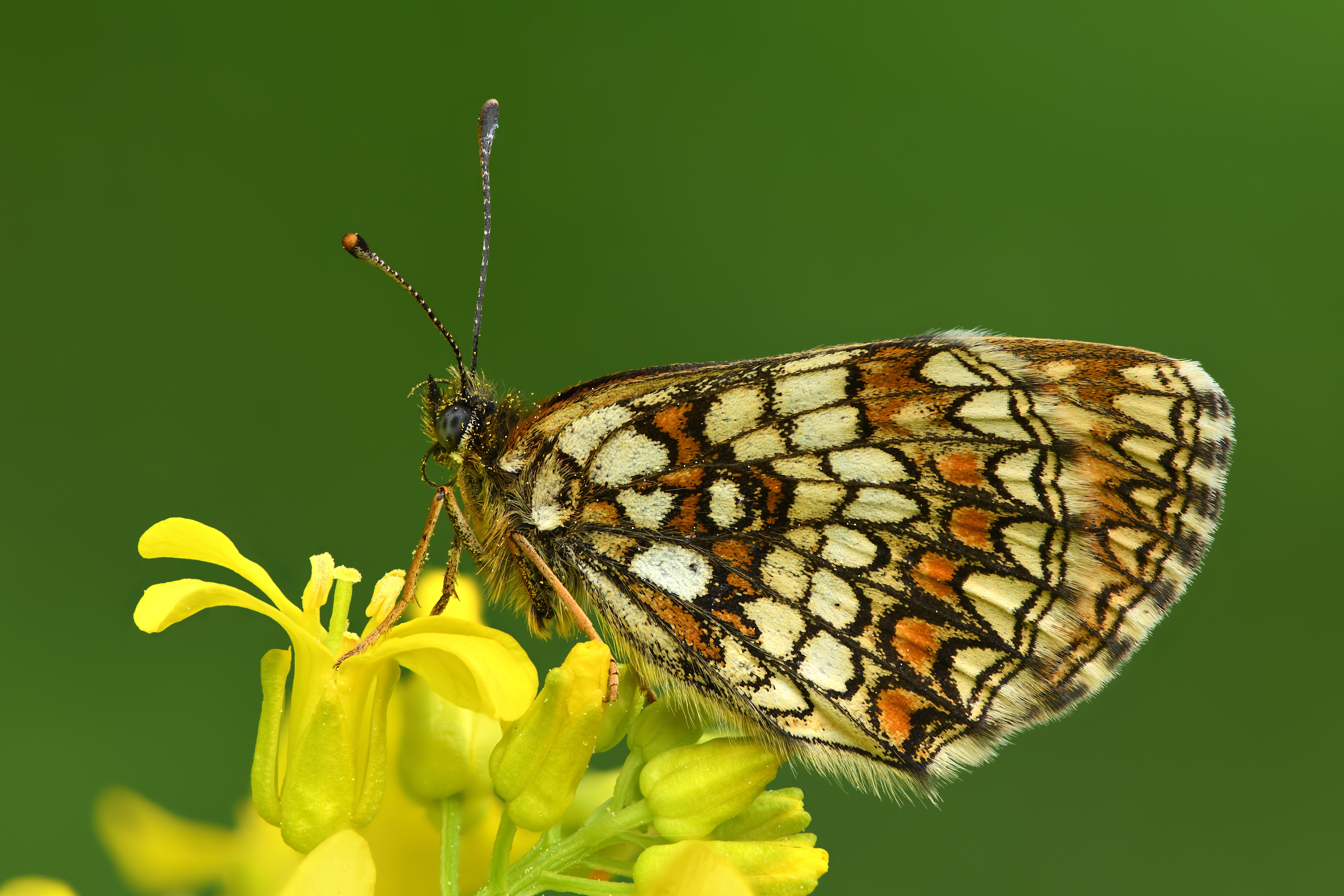
- Both M. a. lachares, Estonia

Scientific classification
- Kingdom: Animalia
- Phylum: Arthropoda
- Class: Insecta
- Order: Lepidoptera
- Family: Nymphalidae
- Genus: Mellicta
- Species: M. athalia

Binomial name
- Mellicta athalia (Rottemburg, 1775)

Synonyms
- List: Melitaea alba Rehfous, 1905; Melitaea aquilari Querci, 1932; Melitaea athalia subsp. aphaea (Hübner, 1816); Melitaea athalia subsp. pyronia (Hübner, 1804); Melitaea athalia von Rottemburg, 1775; Melitaea bifasciata Reverdin, 1914; Melitaea cinnamomea Vorbrodt & Müller-Rutz, 1917; Melitaea cinxiodictynnoides Stauder, 1922; Melitaea commacula Caruel, 1944; Melitaea conica Matsumura, 1929; Melitaea csikii Aigner-Abafi, 1906; Melitaea demarginata Caruel, 1944; Melitaea dictynnaesimilis Verity, 1930; Melitaea fallax Hormuzaki, 1925; Melitaea flavescens Matsumura, 1929; Melitaea flavoelongata Caruel, 1944; Melitaea fulla Quensel, 1791; Melitaea funesta Stauder, 1922; Melitaea indigna Cabeau, 1922; Melitaea latonigena Spuler, 1901; Melitaea leucophana Cabeau, 1912; Melitaea ligata Caruel, 1944; Melitaea melanina Herrich-Schäffer; Melitaea mirabilis Fernández, 1929; Melitaea mirefasciata Cabeau, 1923; Melitaea molpadia Varin, 1933; Melitaea navarina de Selys-Longchamps, 1837; Melitaea nigrathalia Johnstone, 1944; Melitaea nigrobella Rocci, 1942; Melitaea nigropunctata Caruel, 1944; Melitaea norvegica Aurivillius, 1888; Melitaea obsoleta Tutt, 1896; Melitaea phyciodina Hormuzaki, 1934; Melitaea poedotrophos Bergstrasser, 1780; Melitaea postdivergens Rocci, 1930; Melitaea postfuscofasciata Goodson, 1960; Melitaea progressiva Ksenzhopol'sky, 1911; Melitaea pseudodelminia Verity, 1940; Melitaea radiata Eisner, 1942; Melitaea retyezatica Diószeghy, 1930; Melitaea sohana Cabeau, 1922; Melitaea spadana Cabeau, 1922; Melitaea submaxima Verity, 1924; Melitaea subtusnigrescens Caruel, 1944; Melitaea tectensis Cabeau, 1922; Melitaea tessellata Stephens, 1827; Melitaea transitoria Eisner, 1942; Melitaea tricolor Hormuzaki, 1897; Melitaea unifasciata Caruel, 1944; Melitaea virgata Tutt, 1896; Mellicta aphaea Hübner; Mellicta athalia subsp. athalia; Mellicta athalia subsp. norvegica (Aurivillius, 1888); Mellicta corythallia Hübner, 1790; Mellicta dorfmeisteri Hellweger, 1911; Mellicta hertha Quensel, 1791; Mellicta neglecta Pfau, 1962; Mellicta nigriornea Lempke, 1955; Mellicta nigromarginata Lempke, 1955; Mellicta reticulata Higgins, 1955; Mellicta samonica Riesen, 1891; Papilio athalia Rottemburg, 1775; Papilio eos Haworth, 1803; Papilio leucippe Schneider, 1789; Papilio pyronia Hübner, 1804

= Heath fritillary =

Species of butterfly

The heath fritillary (Melitaea athalia) is a species of butterfly in the family Nymphalidae. It is found throughout the Palaearctic from western Europe to Japan, in heathland, grassland, and in coppiced woodland. Its association with coppiced woodland earned it the name "woodman's follower" in parts of the UK. It is considered a threatened species in the UK and Germany, but not Europe-wide or globally.

== Description ==
Heath fritillaries have a wingspan of 39–47 mm. The upperside is predominantly dark brown and orange brown, with the orange-brown spots delineated by dark brown (along and across the wing veins); there is a white fringe to the wings through which the dark brown extends. The upperside of the body is a similar dark brown to the colour on the wing, and the base of both wings is dark brown. The underside shows bands of red and (off-)white, again with each vein dark brown and each colour delineated by dark brown. The pattern of white spots at the base of the hindwing (visible at rest) is diagnostic for identification.

These wing patterns are very similar to the appearance of Melitaea cinxia. However, the dark brown bands on underside of the wings are more distinct in the heath fritillary than in M. cinxia.

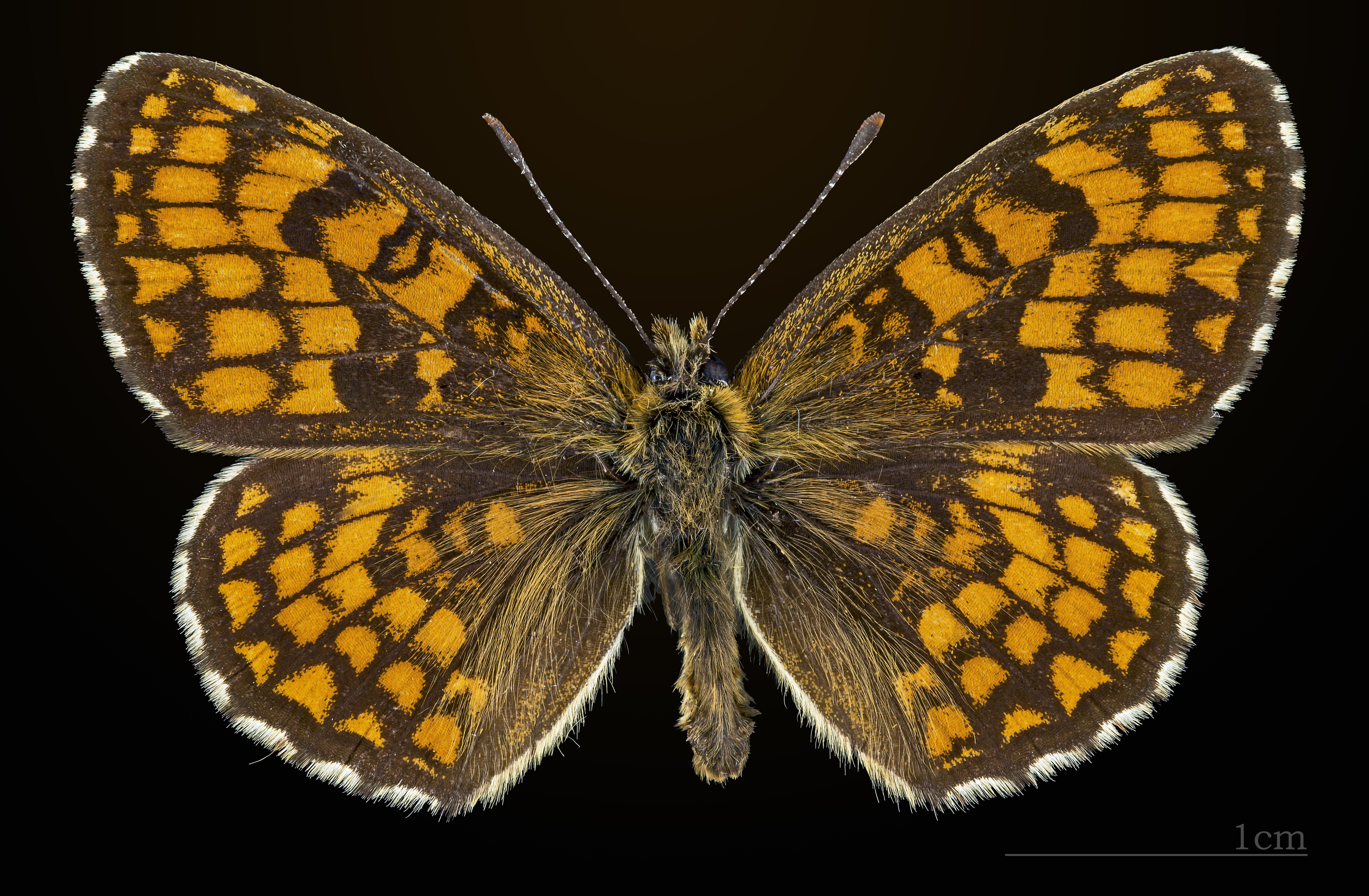
Male

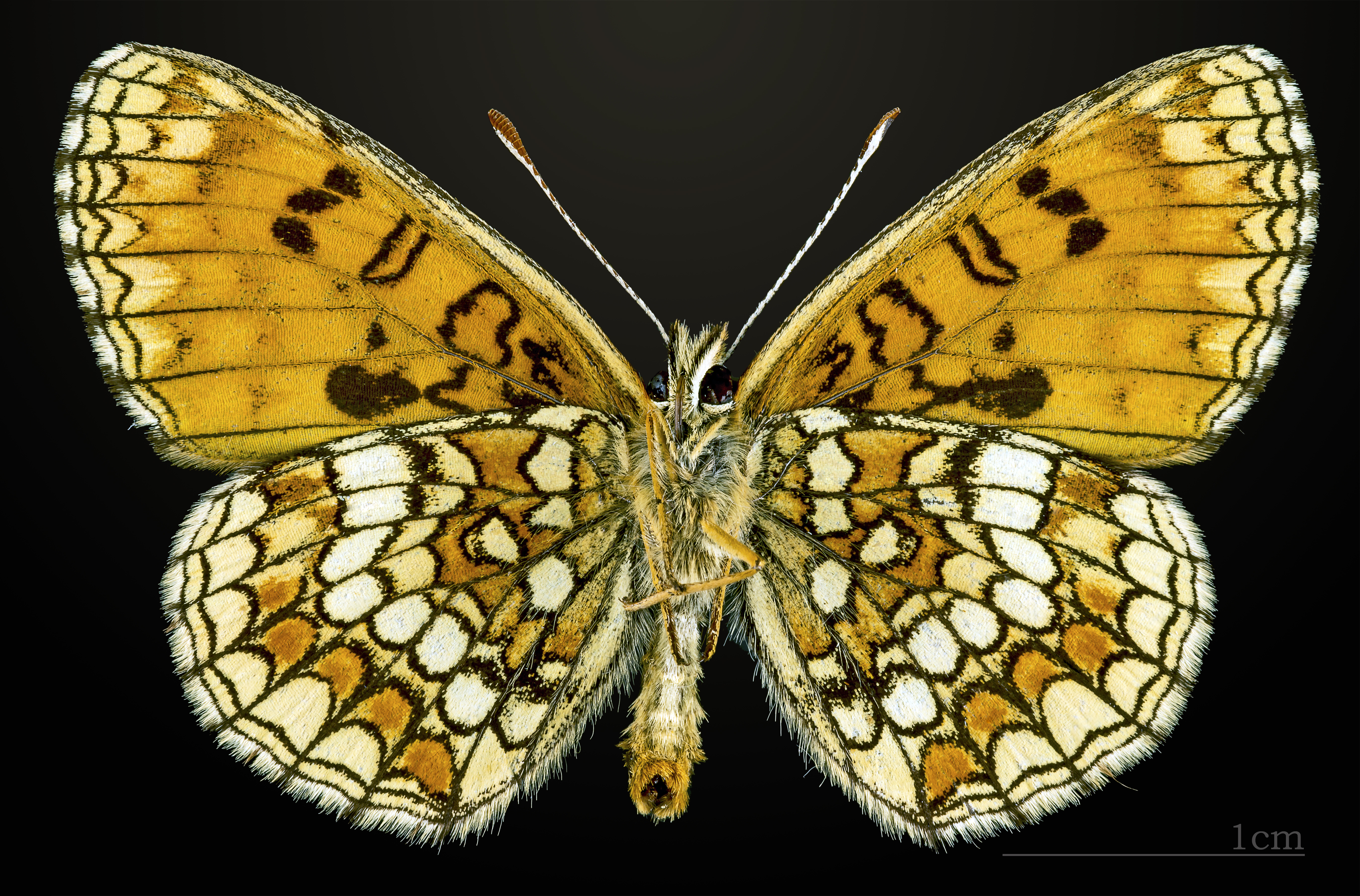
Male underside

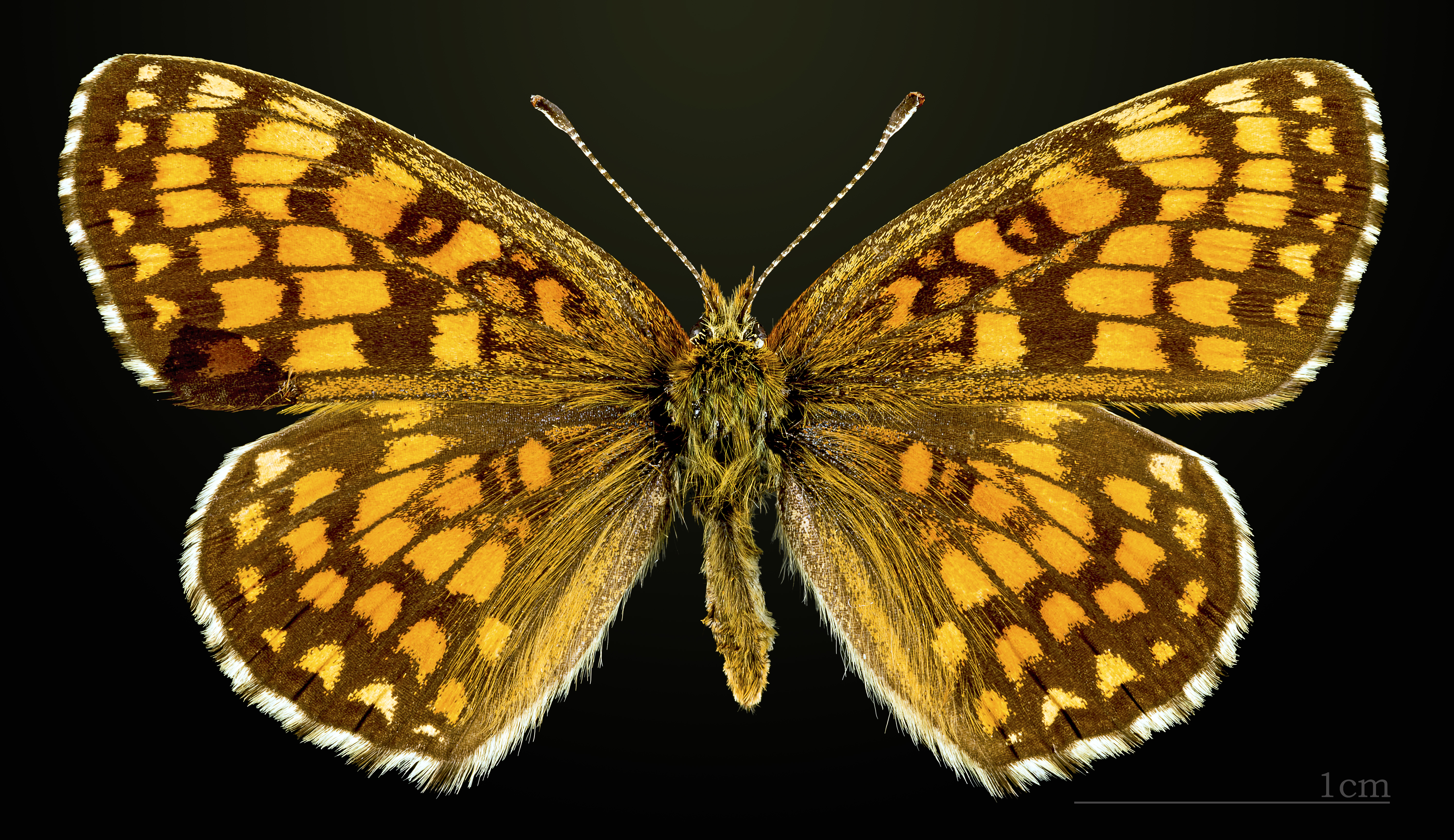
Female

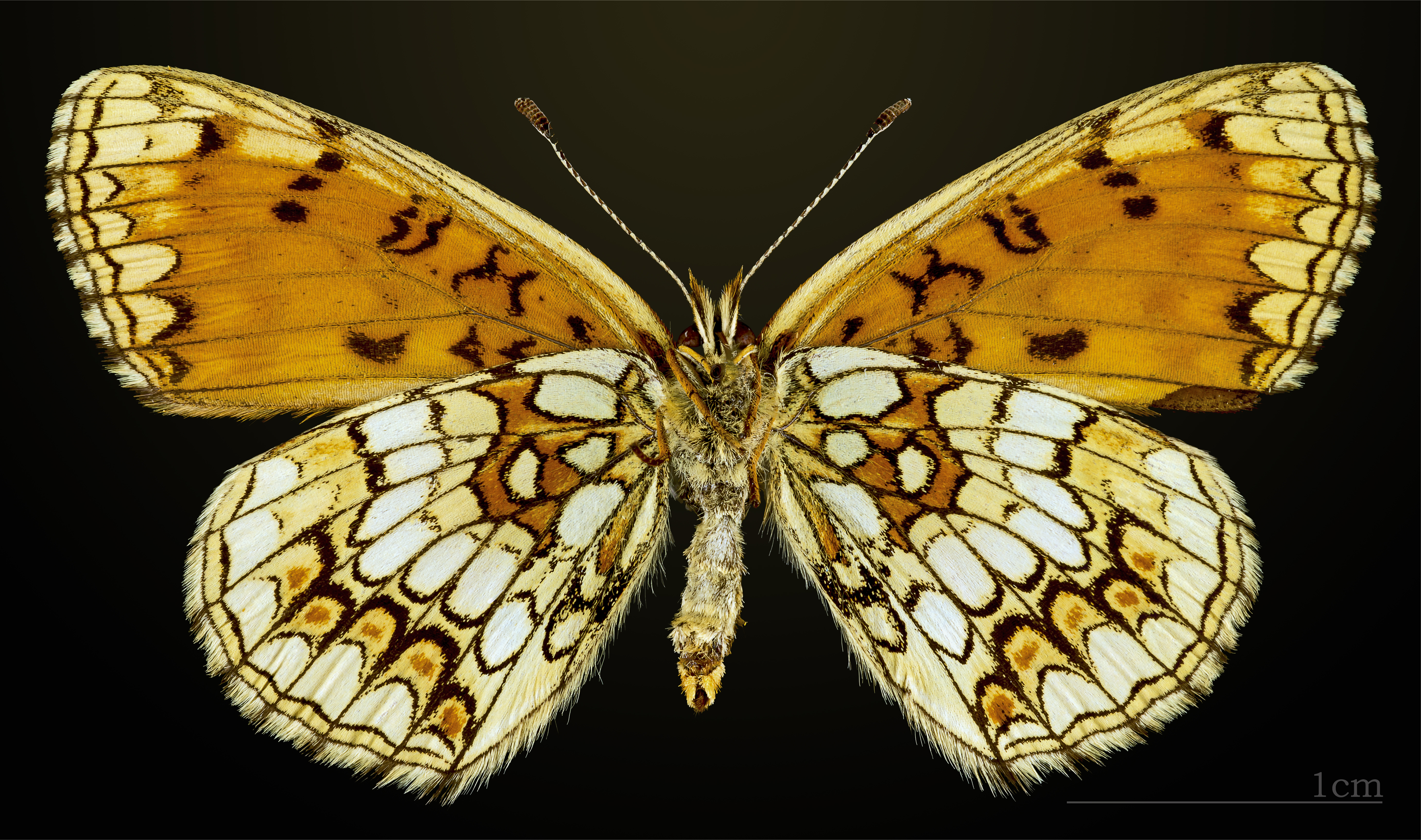
Female underside

== Range ==
The heath fritillary ranges throughout the Palaearctic region from western Europe to Japan. In Europe, it is absent from Iceland, Ireland, Scotland, Wales, southern Portugal, southern Spain, the Mediterranean islands and southern Greece.

In the UK, it is restricted to Cornwall and Devon grasslands (abandoned hay meadows); Exmoor (heathland); and Kent and Essex (coppiced woodland on acid soils). The populations in Essex are the result of reintroductions, and further reintroductions are ongoing in various other parts of the UK. In the late 1990s, the species was estimated to occupy just 0.2% within the 10-km grid squares over the whole of its UK range.

Its altitudinal range is from sea level to 2600 m.

== Status ==
Heath fritillary is not listed on the IUCN Red List, suggesting that globally it is not considered threatened. In the UK, however, the species was "considered to be the most endangered British butterfly" after a nationwide survey in 1980 found only 31 surviving colonies. Consequently, it was given protection under the Wildlife and Countryside Act 1981. Despite subsequent widespread efforts to conserve and manage the species' habitats, it has continued to decline: distribution has declined 25% since the 1970s, and abundance-wise it declined by 46% in the 10 years 1995–2004. Woodland sites in Kent and Essex are actively managed (coppiced) for the conservation of this species. It has been a "high priority" species in the UK Biodiversity Action Plan since 1995 and has its own Species Action Plan.

Heath fritillary is also on the "Red List" in Germany.

However, the species is considered of "least concern" on a European scale.

== Habitat ==
Within Europe, the heath fritillary occupies a diversity of grassy, flowery habitats—dry or damp, upland or lowland, with or without shrubs or trees, including woodland clearings and heathland.

More specifically, in England, this species occupies three distinct habitats:

- Unimproved grassland with abundant short (5–15 cm) or sparse swards of ribwort plantain or germander speedwell (or both) on stony soils – sometimes in the form of abandoned hay meadows
- Sheltered heathland with common cow-wheat scattered among bilberry-dominated vegetation – valleys with mineral soils
- Coppiced woodland (especially in clearings) with common cow-wheat on acid soils.

In France, this species also occurs on unimproved hay meadows and pastures.

=== Conservation projects ===
The Wilder Blean project, headed up by the Wildwood Trust and Kent Wildlife Trust, is introducing European bison to the UK for the first time in 6000 years. Their actions create open, light-flooded patches that encourage the growth of cow wheat. The herd of 3 females and 1 male will be set free in 2022 within a 2,500-acre conservation area in Blean Woods near Canterbury.

== Habits ==
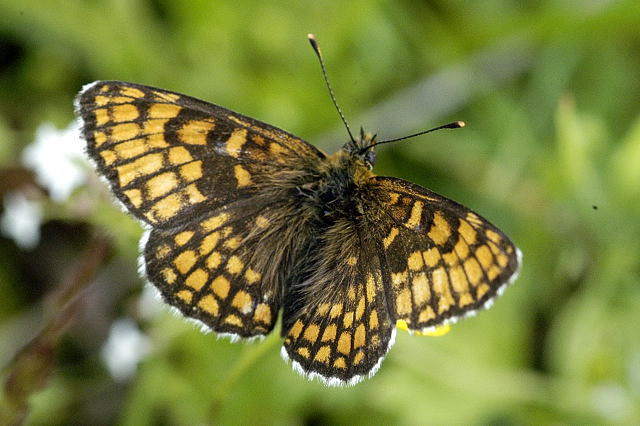

Heath fritillaries typically fly close to the ground, with characteristic "flits" and glides. Colonies tend to be compact, centred on favoured breeding areas. Heath fritillaries are highly sedentary for the most part, adults rarely moving more than 100 m; however, some have been recorded dispersing up to 2 km. For a species of often short-lived habitats, it has remarkably limited colonizing ability; suitable habitats over 600 m from an existing colony are colonized slowly.

== Life cycle ==
=== Egg ===
The female heath fritillary lays its eggs (or ova) in batches of (15–)80–150 on the underside of leaf of a larval food plant or on a plant adjacent to the larval food plant.

Eggs are oval spheroids with flattened bases, about 0.5 mm high. They are ribbed (longitudinally, i.e. from top to bottom) and striated (transversely, i.e. around the egg). Pale cream when laid, eggs darken to pale yellow within two days, and then dark grey a few days before hatching. Eggs mature in two to three weeks.

=== Caterpillar ===
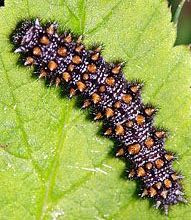
The caterpillar is black with yellow-orange spines and off-white spots

Upon emergence, first-instar caterpillars (or larvae) eat their eggshells. The caterpillars from a clutch initially stay together, feeding in a small, unobtrusive web. Second or third instar caterpillars disperse into smaller groups. Then the third instars tend to feed and rest solitarily; they rest beneath dead leaves at night and during bad weather. The caterpillar hibernates for the winter in a hibernaculum, made from a curled dead leaf by spinning its edges together. Hibernacula are usually close to the ground. Although most caterpillars hibernate singly, they sometimes group in twos and threes, although 15 to 20 caterpillars have been found in single hibernaculum.

Caterpillars re-emerge in early spring. When it is warm, they feed a little, but most of the time is spent basking in the sun. There are six instars in total. The full-grown sixth instar caterpillar is 22–25 mm long, and predominantly black; it has pale (yellow-orange) spines and (greyish-white) spots.

=== Pupa ===
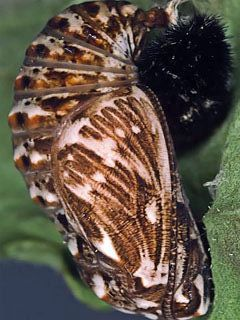
The pupa is predominantly brown and white

The pupae are 12.4–12.8 cm long and last 15–25 days (early May to late June in the UK). They are white with black and orange-brown blotches. Pupae are usually found close to the ground in or beneath dead leaves.

A study in Cornwall, England, recorded mortality rates in the region of 50%, mostly from predation by small mammals, but including predation by beetles, and parasitism.

=== Imago ===
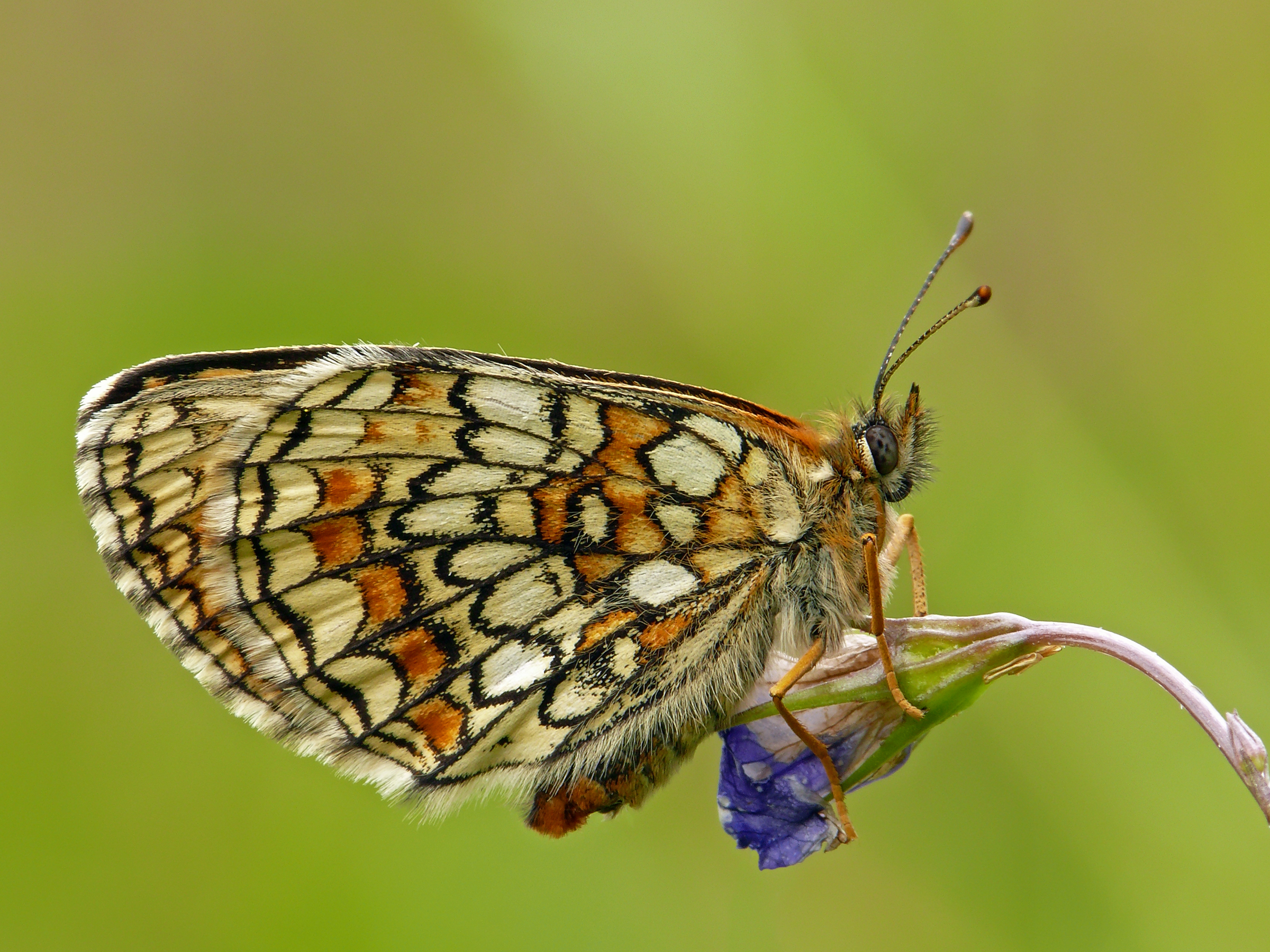

Imagines probably live for 5–10 days. Males are active on warm sunny days. Females mate once shortly after emerging; they lay their eggs only during warm weather, spending most of the time either basking or hiding in vegetation.

==== Flight period ====
Across its range (see "Subspecies and variation" below), subspecies M. a. athalia shows a protracted flight period from mid-May to mid-August. In favourable localities and/or favourable seasons, a partial second brood has been recorded from mid- or late August to September. In the UK, the flight period is from the end of May to the beginning of July (in the south-west) and early June to early August (in the south-east).

Fennoscandian subspecies M. a. norvegica flies in June–July, precise timing being affected by the season.

In southern Europe, subspecies M. a. celadussa flies in a single brood at high altitude in June and July. Below the subalpine level, however, it is bivoltine, flying in May–June and late July–August—except for f. nevadensis in the Sierra Nevada, which is univoltine.

== Host plants ==
In the UK, the following species are used:

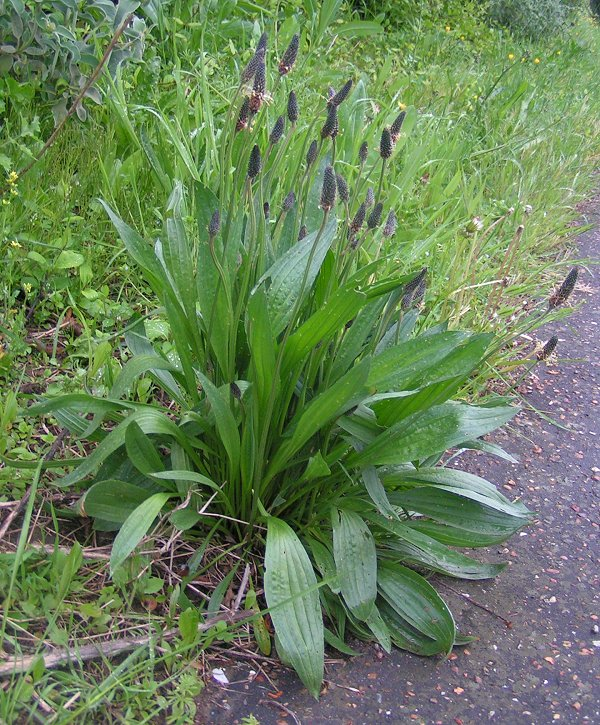
Ribwort plantain—one of the two main food plants on grassland

- Common cow-wheat (Melampyrum pratense) – the only food plant in woodland, and principal food plant on heathland
- Common foxglove (Digitalis purpurea) – secondary food plant on heathland
- Ribwort plantain (Plantago lanceolata) – major food plant on grassland
- Germander speedwell (Veronica chamaedrys) – major food plant on grassland
- Greater plantain (Plantago major) – secondary food plant
- Ivy-leaved speedwell (Veronica hederifolia) – secondary food plant
- Thyme-leaved speedwell (Veronica serpyllifolia) – secondary food plant
- Yarrow (Achillea millefolium) – secondary food plant

Additional host plants used elsewhere in Europe are:

- Alpine plantain (Plantago alpina)
- Mountain speedwell (Veronica montana)
- Heath speedwell (Veronica officinalis)
- Spiked speedwell (Veronica spicata)
- Small cow-wheat (Melampyrum sylvaticum)
- Rusty foxglove (Digitalis ferruginea)
- Yellow foxglove (Digitalis lutea)
- Common toadflax (Linaria vulgaris)

== Subspecies and variation ==
Up to eight subspecies are recognized in Europe:

- M. a. athalia – from the Atlantic coast to the Bosphorus (Turkey) (altitude 0–2200 m), excluding the ranges of the following subspecies
- M. a. norvegica Aurivillius 1888 – Fennoscandia (altitude 0–800 m)
- M. a. celadussa Frühstorfer 1910 – northern Iberia and the Sierra Nevada, southern France, southern Switzerland, Italy (including Sicily) (altitude 0–2600 m)

- The transitional zone between subspecies athalia and celadussa is broad—up to 150 km in places

- M. a. dictynnoides (Hormuzaki 1898) – south-west Europe?
- M. a. lucifuga (Fruhstorfer 1917) – south-east Europe
- M. a. reticulata Higgins 1955 – Altai
- M. a. baikalensis (Bremer 1961) – southern Siberia to Amur?
- M. a. hyperborea Dubatolov 1997 – Magadan, Kamchatka

Many forms and subspecies of M. a. athalia have been described, but are best regarded as "ecological variants" and intermediates in clinal variation. Bulgaria has f. boris Frühstorfer, with heavier marginal borders, alongside the typical nominate form.

In central Sweden and Finland, M. a. norvegica f. lachares Frühstorfer has finer black markings; transitional forms between f. lachares and typical M. a. norvegica occur in southern Sweden.

Melitaea athalia celadussa

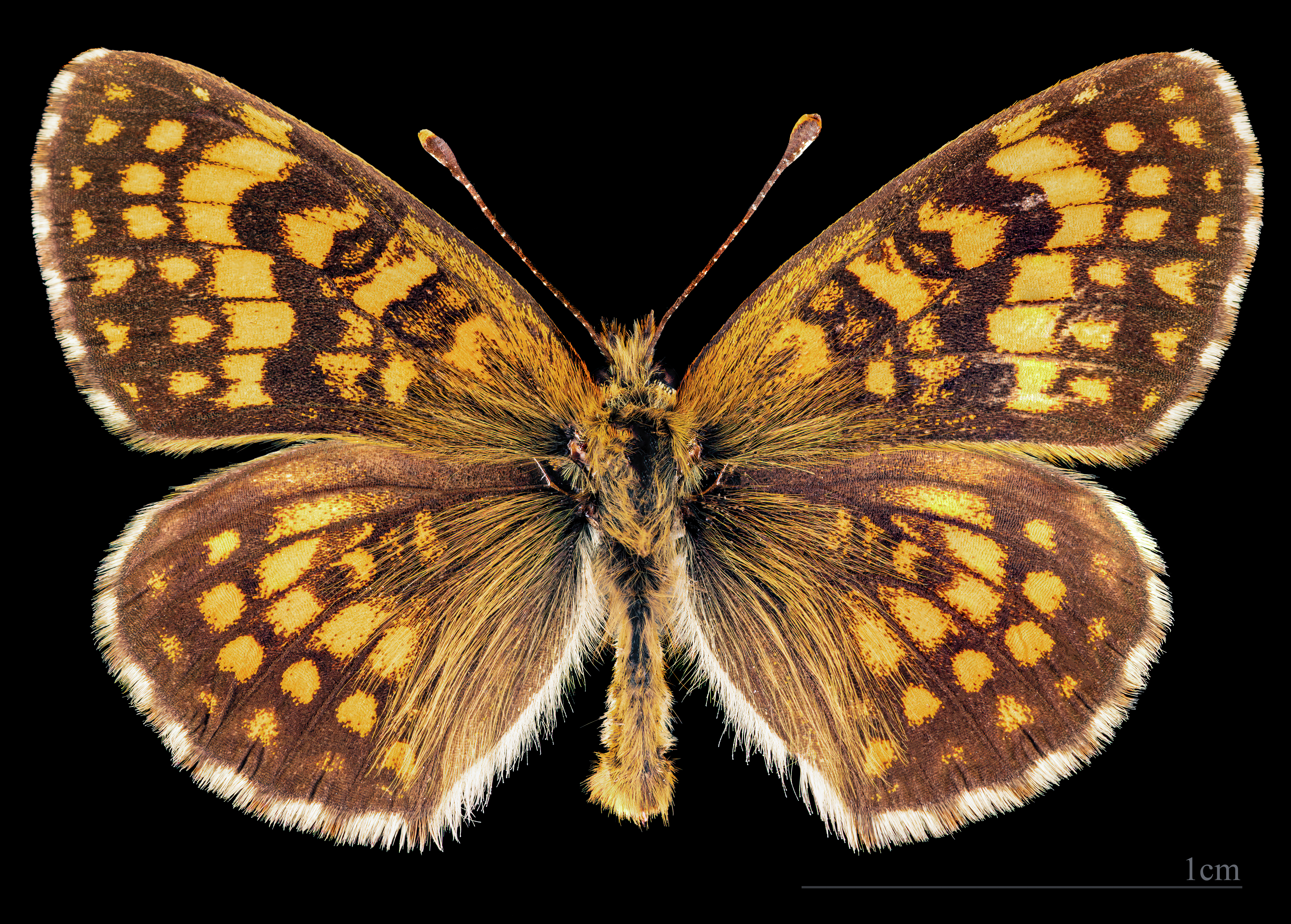
♂

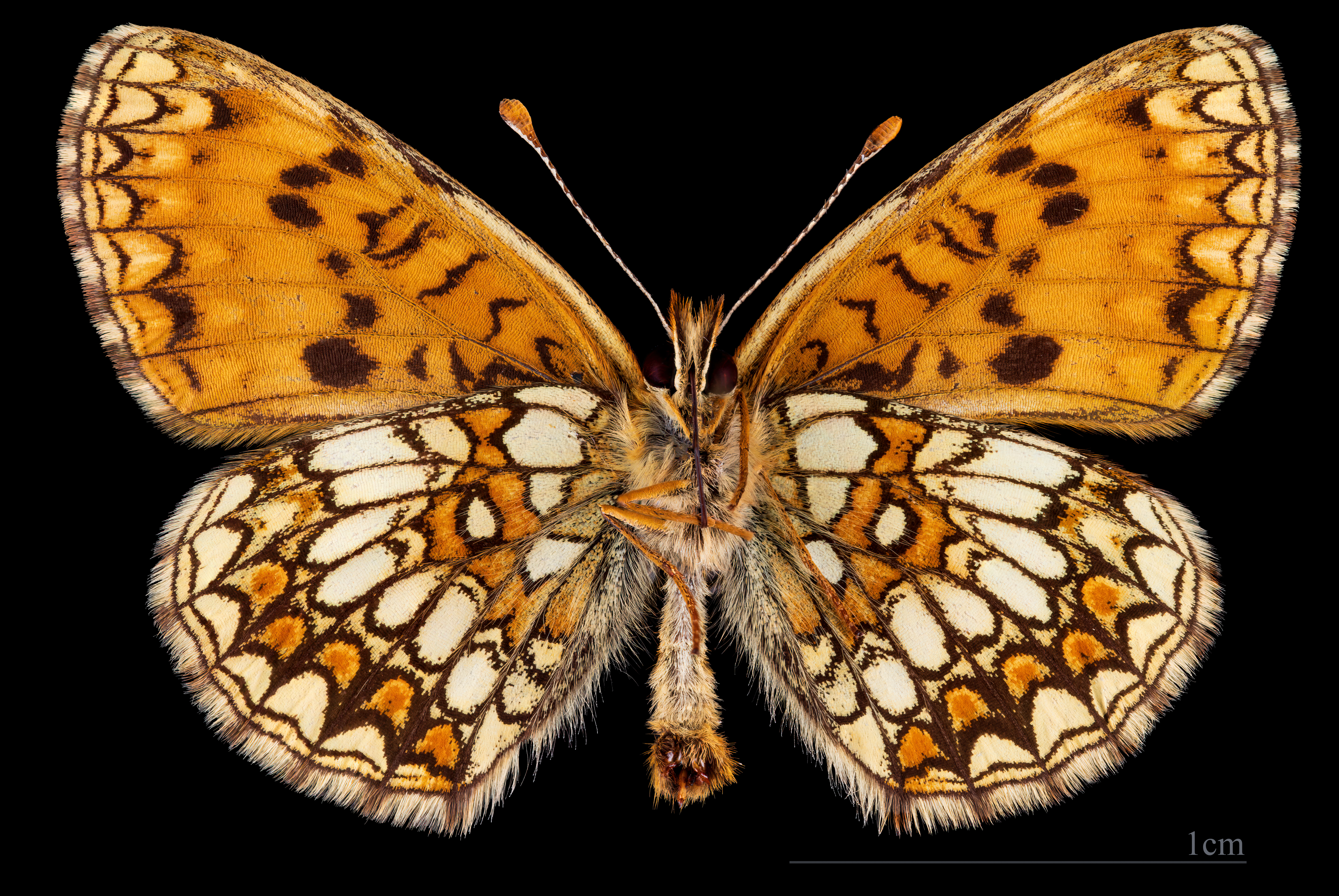
♂ △

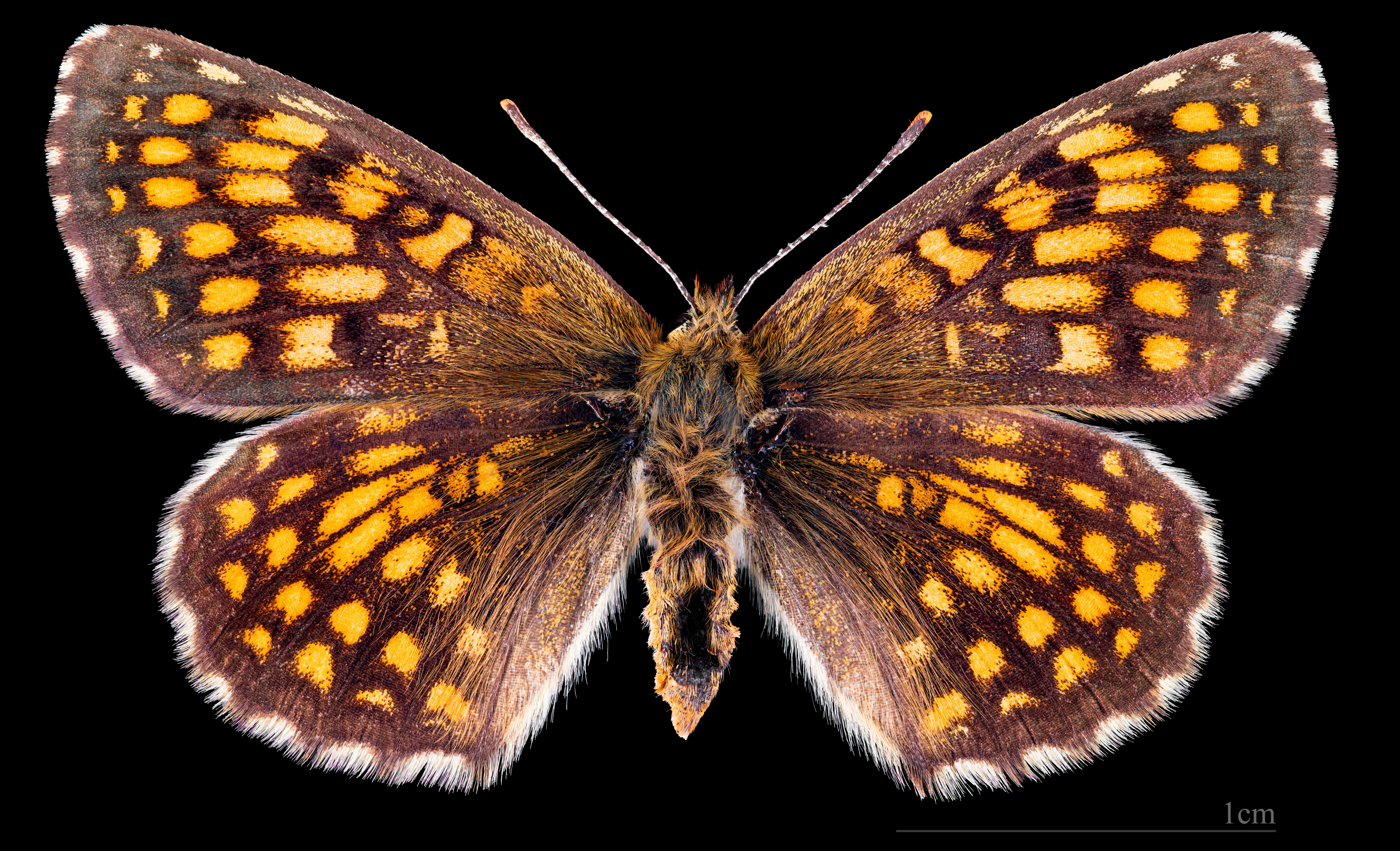
♀

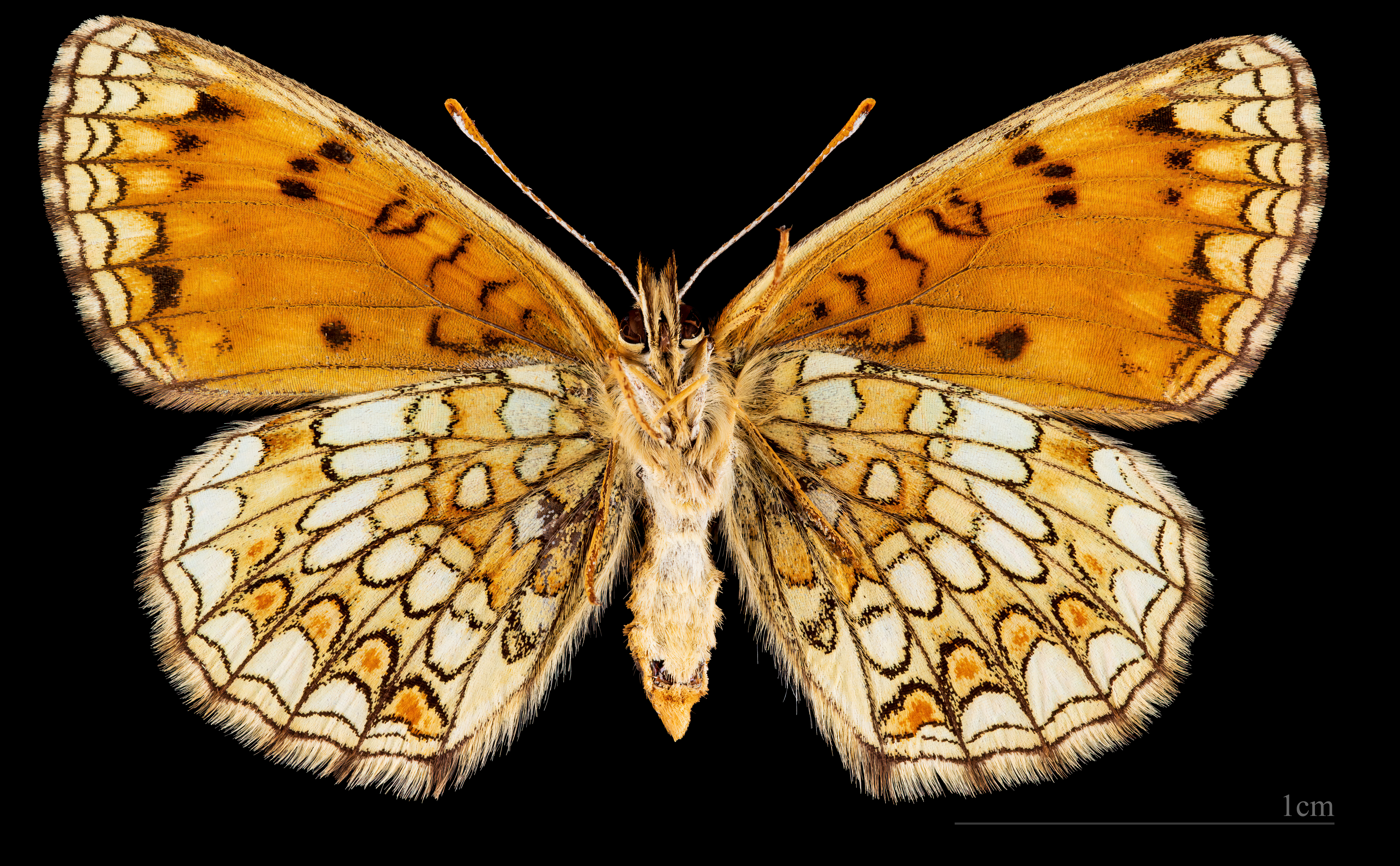
♀ △

Melitaea athalia lachares

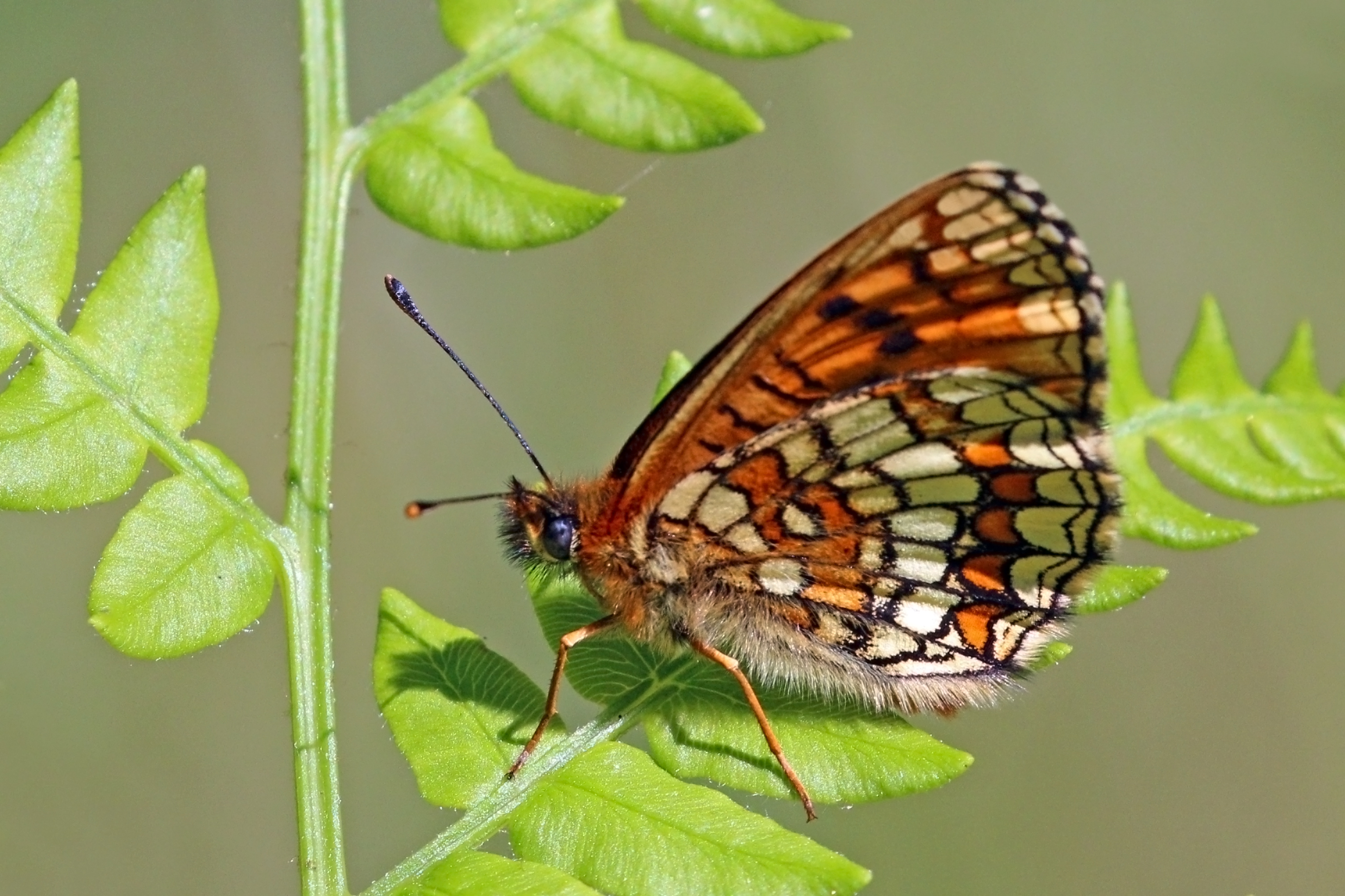
M. a. lachares, Estonia

In Portugal and north-west Spain, M. a. celadussa f. biedermanni Querci is larger than typical M. a. celadussa, with finer black lines in the outer half of the wing, but a thicker discal line; transitional forms occur in central west Spain. In Sierra Nevada, f. nevadensis Verity is golden yellow with fine black markings (it is also univoltine, whereas typical M. a. celadussa is bivoltine at low altitude). In "southern" Europe, f. tenuicola Verity occurs in late broods—it is small and its black markings reduced.
