= S. A. von Rottemburg =

German entomologist

Siegmund Adrian von Rottemburg (28 April 1745 – 1797) was a German entomologist in the 18th century. Little is known about him by scientific historians. In the 1770s he took over Johann Siegfried Hufnagel's lepidopterological collection and published several works about it in Der Naturforscher.

He described several species:

- Paranthrene tabaniformis (dusky clearwing)
- Hyles gallii (bedstraw hawk-moth)
- Thymelicus acteon (Lulworth skipper)
- Lycaena alciphron (purple-shot copper)
- Polyommatus semiargus (Mazarine blue)
- Polyommatus icarus (common blue)
- Polyommatus bellargus (Adonis blue)
- Brenthis ino (lesser marbled fritillary)
- Euphydryas aurinia (marsh fritillary)
- Melitaea athalia (heath fritillary)
- Hyponephele lycaon (dusky meadow brown)

== Works ==
- Rottemburg, S. A. von (1775a): Anmerkungen zu den Hufnagelischen Tabellen der Schmetterlinge. Erste Abtheilung. – Der Naturforscher, 6: 1-34.
- Rottemburg, S. A. von (1775b): Anmerkungen zu den Hufnagelischen Tabellen der Schmetterlinge. Zweyte Abtheilung. – Der Naturforscher, 7: 105-112.
- Rottemburg, S. A. von (1776a): Anmerkungen zu den Hufnagelischen Tabellen der Schmetterlinge. Der dritten Abtheilung erste Classe. – Der Naturforscher, 8: 101-111.
- Rottemburg, S. A. von (1776b): Anmerkungen zu den Hufnagelischen Tabellen der Schmetterlinge. Der dritten Abtheilung zwote Classe. – Der Naturforscher, 9: 111-144.
- Rottemburg, S. A. von (1777): Anmerkungen zu den Hufnagelischen Tabellen der Schmetterlinge. Der dritten Abtheilung dritte Classe. – Der Naturforscher, 11: 63-91.
