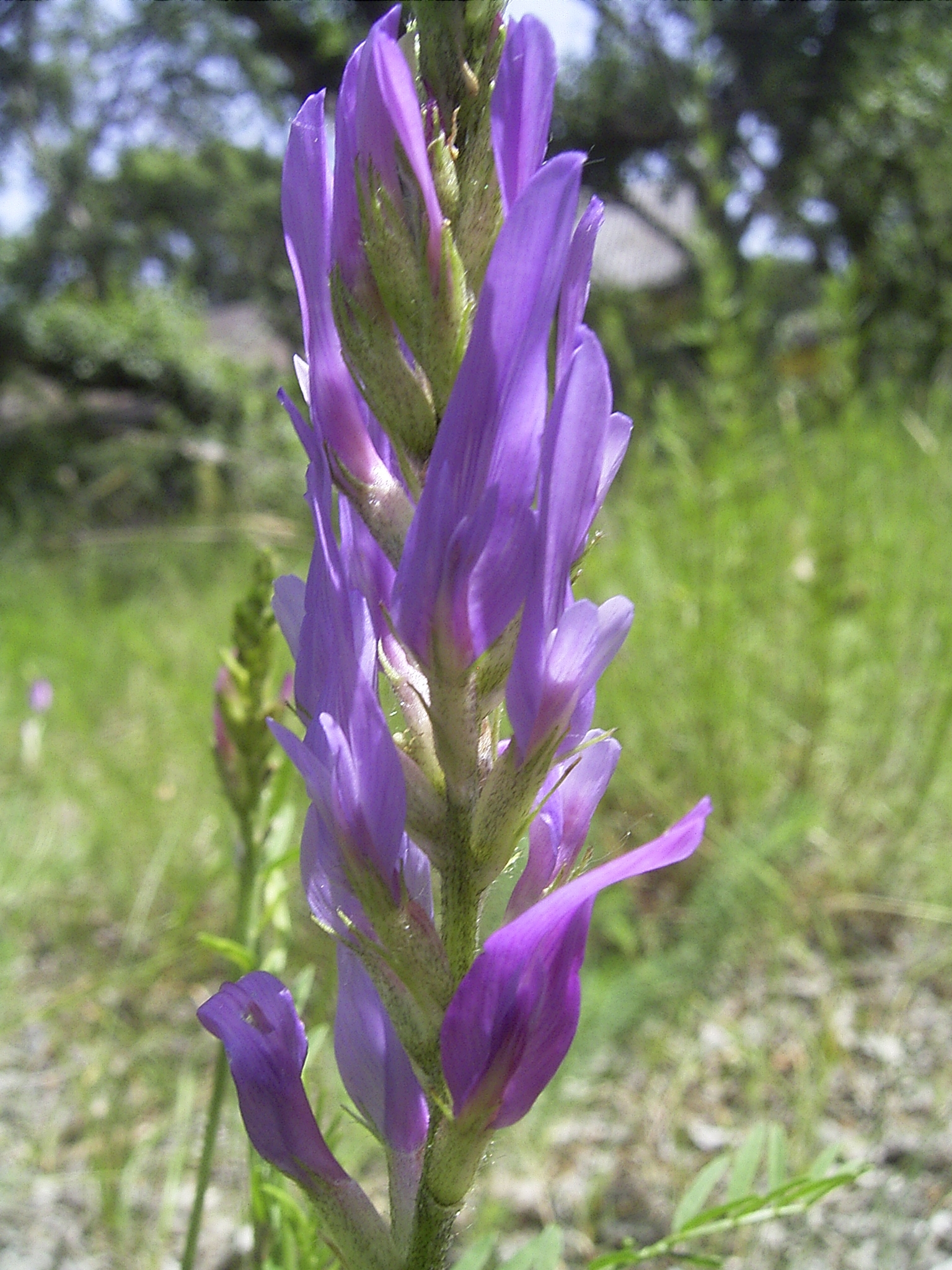

Scientific classification
- Kingdom: Plantae
- Clade: Tracheophytes
- Clade: Angiosperms
- Clade: Eudicots
- Clade: Rosids
- Order: Fabales
- Family: Fabaceae
- Subfamily: Faboideae
- Genus: Astragalus
- Species: A. onobrychis

Binomial name
- Astragalus onobrychis L., 1753

= Astragalus onobrychis =

Species of legume

Astragalus onobrychis, commonly known as the saintfoin milkvetch, is a species of milkvetch in the family Fabaceae. It is the type species of the genus Astragalus, the largest genus of flowering plants by number of known species.

== Distribution ==
Astragalus onobrychis is native to Eurasia, where it has a cosmpolitan distribution. It is found as far east as Mongolia and as far west as Spain. It also has an isolated habitat in Guadeloupe.
