= List of lycaenid genera: N =

The large butterfly family Lycaenidae contains the following genera starting with the letter N:

- Nabokovia
- Nacaduba
- Neaveia
- Neocheritra
- Neoepitola
- Neolucia
- Neolysandra
- Neomyrina
- Neopithecops
- Neozephyrus
- Nesa
- Nesiostrymon
- Nesolycaena
- Nicolaea
- Niphanda
- Notarthrinus
- Nothodanis
