= List of lycaenid genera: R =

The large butterfly family Lycaenidae contains the following genera starting with the letter R:

- Radissima
- Rapala
- Rathinda
- Ravenna
- Rekoa
- Remelana
- Rhamma
- Rhinelephas
- Rimisia
- Rindgea
- Ritra
- Rueckbeilia
- Rysops
