= List of lycaenid genera: G =

The large butterfly family Lycaenidae contains the following genera starting with the letter G:

- Gaeides
- Gargina
- Gibbossa
- Gigantorubra
- Glabroculus
- Glaucopsyche
- Goldia
- Gonerilia
- Grumiana
