= List of lycaenid genera: U =

The large butterfly family Lycaenidae contains the following genera starting with the letter U:

- Udara
- Una
- Upolampes
- Uranobothria
- Uranothauma
- Ussuriana
