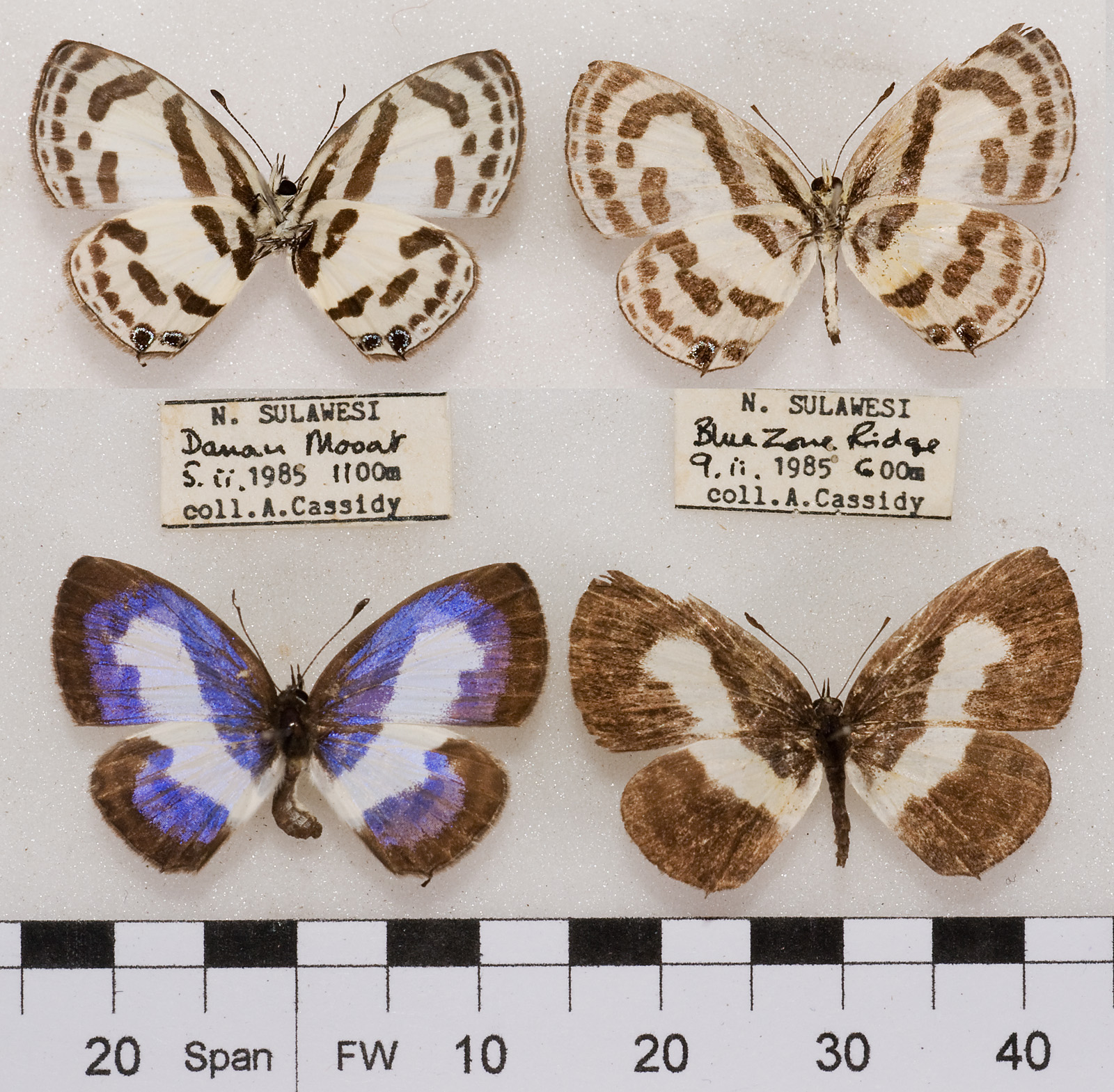
- Discolampa ethion ulyssides

Scientific classification
- Kingdom: Animalia
- Phylum: Arthropoda
- Clade: Pancrustacea
- Class: Insecta
- Order: Lepidoptera
- Family: Lycaenidae
- Subfamily: Polyommatinae
- Tribe: Polyommatini
- Genus: Discolampa; Toxopeus, 1929

= Discolampa =

Butterfly genus in family Lycaenidae

Discolampa is a genus of butterflies in the family Lycaenidae. The genus ranges from Sri Lanka to New Guinea.

== Family ==
Lycaenidae, commonly known as the blues or gossamer-winged butterflies.

== Distribution ==
They are found in Southeast Asia, ranging from Sri Lanka to New Guinea.

== Appearance ==
- Size: They are likely small to medium-sized butterflies, though specific measurements are difficult to find.
- Banded Blue Pierrot (Discolampa ethion): This is the best-documented species. It has:
  - Upper wings: Dark blue with a broad white band across the middle. The inner and outer edges of the white band are edged with black. The base and edges of the wings are also black.
  - Underside: Mostly white with black markings that resemble ribbons and spots.
  - Body: Black head, antennae, thorax, and abdomen. The palpi (mouthparts) have a white stripe down the middle.
- Other species (Discolampa albula & Discolampa ilissus): Information on their appearance is scarce, but they are likely to be similarly small with blue or brown upper wings and potentially white markings.

== Behavior ==
- Diet: Like most Lycaenidae butterflies, Discolampa larvae likely feed on the leaves of specific leguminous plants (plants with bean-like seedpods).
- Habitat: They are found in Southeast Asian forests, particularly in areas with good tree cover.
- Flight: Specific flight patterns are unknown, but Lycaenidae butterflies are typically weak fliers and prefer short, flitting movements.

== Species ==
There are only three known species in the Discolampa genus:

- Discolampa albula (Grose-Smith, 1897) - West Irian (New Guinea)
- Discolampa ethion (Westwood, 1851)
- Discolampa ilissus (C. & R. Felder, 1859) - Sulawesi
