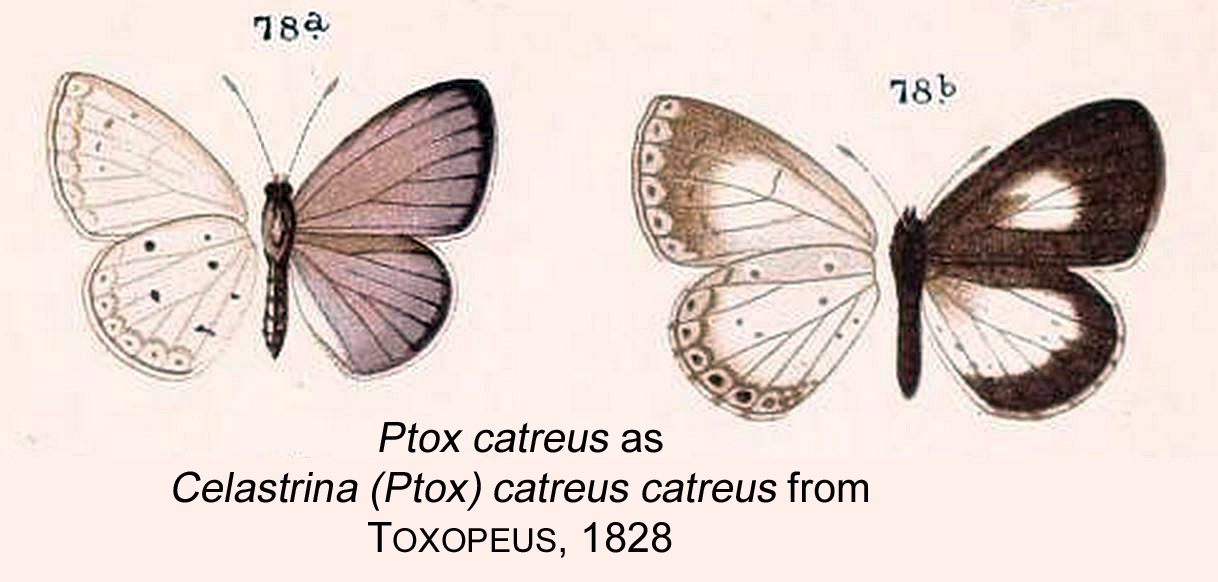

Scientific classification
- Domain: Eukaryota
- Kingdom: Animalia
- Phylum: Arthropoda
- Class: Insecta
- Order: Lepidoptera
- Family: Lycaenidae
- Subfamily: Polyommatinae
- Tribe: Polyommatini
- Genus: Ptox; Toxopeus, 1928

= Ptox =

Butterfly genus in family Lycaenidae

Ptox is a genus of butterflies in the family Lycaenidae.

== Species ==
- Ptox catreus (de Nicéville, 1895)
- Ptox corythus (de Nicéville, 1895)
