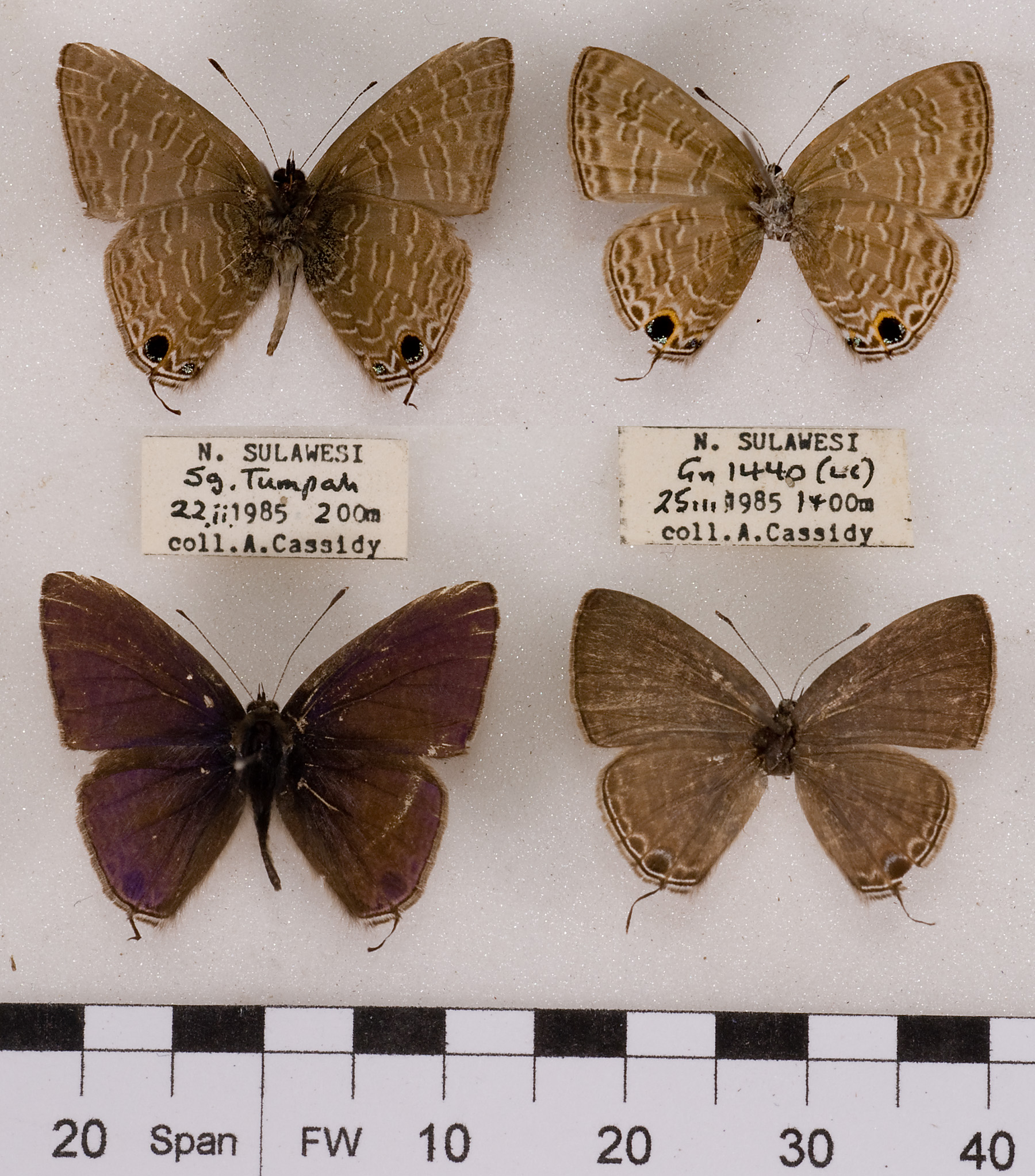
- Ionolyce helicon

Scientific classification
- Domain: Eukaryota
- Kingdom: Animalia
- Phylum: Arthropoda
- Class: Insecta
- Order: Lepidoptera
- Family: Lycaenidae
- Subfamily: Polyommatinae
- Tribe: Polyommatini
- Genus: Ionolyce; Toxopeus, 1929

= Ionolyce =

Butterfly genus in family Lycaenidae

Ionolyce is a small genus of butterflies in the family Lycaenidae. I. helicon is widespread in the Indoaustralasian region (India to the Malay Archipelago. I selkon and I.brunnescens are both endemic to the Solomon Islands.

== Description ==
Medium-sized blues, the hindwing with a thin, white-tipped tail. The male's upper side is blue violet, the female is brown with scattered blue scales. The underside is brown with fine, white transverse stripes and an orange spot at the rear corner of the hind wing.

== Species ==
- Ionolyce brunnescens Tite, 1963
- Ionolyce helicon (Felder, 1860)
- Ionolyce selkon Parsons, 1986
