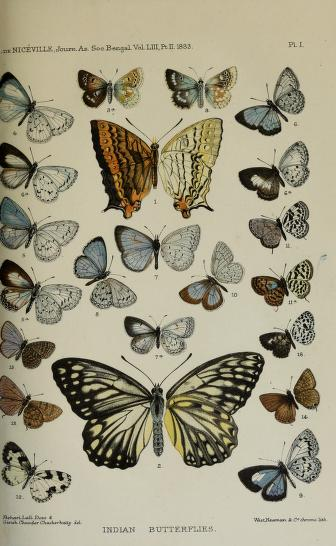
- Petrelaea dana Fig.15

Scientific classification
- Kingdom: Animalia
- Phylum: Arthropoda
- Clade: Pancrustacea
- Class: Insecta
- Order: Lepidoptera
- Family: Lycaenidae
- Subfamily: Polyommatinae
- Tribe: Polyommatini
- Genus: Petrelaea; Toxopeus, 1929

= Petrelaea =

Butterfly genus in family Lycaenidae

Petrelaea is a small genus of butterfly in the family Lycaenidae. Its species are found in the Australasian and Indomalayan realms.

== Species ==
- Petrelaea dana (de Nicéville, 1884)
- Petrelaea tombugensis (Röber, 1886) New Guinea, Celebes, Thursday Island, Sulawesi, Sula, Solomon Islands, North Australia, Ogasawara Island.
