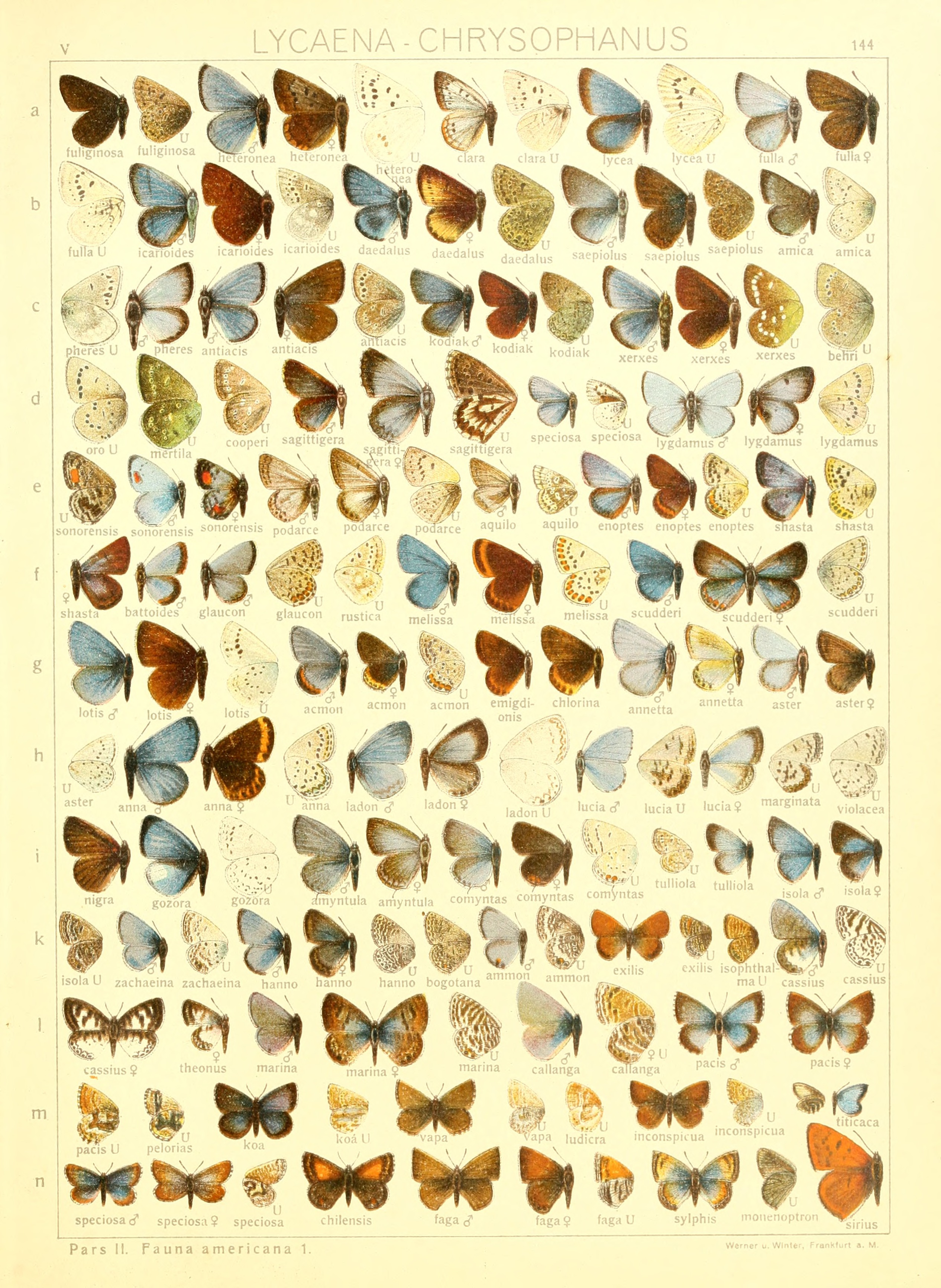
- Eldoradina sylphis (Draudt, 1921) in Seitz144n

Scientific classification
- Domain: Eukaryota
- Kingdom: Animalia
- Phylum: Arthropoda
- Class: Insecta
- Order: Lepidoptera
- Family: Lycaenidae
- Subfamily: Polyommatinae
- Tribe: Polyommatini
- Genus: Eldoradina; Balletto, 1993

Synonyms
- Polytheclus Balint & Johnson, 1993

= Eldoradina =

Butterfly genus in family Lycaenidae

Eldoradina is a Neotropical genus of butterfly in the family Lycaenidae found in mountainous regions in Peru. It contains two species:

- Eldoradina cyanea Balletto, 1993
- Eldoradina sylphis (Draudt, 1921)
