= Parelodina =

Scientific classification
- Domain: Eukaryota
- Kingdom: Animalia
- Phylum: Arthropoda
- Class: Insecta
- Order: Lepidoptera
- Family: Lycaenidae
- Subfamily: Polyommatinae
- Tribe: Polyommatini
- Genus: Parelodina; Bethune-Baker, 1904
- Species: P. aroa

Binomial name
- Parelodina aroa Bethune-Baker, 1904

Monotypic butterfly genus in family Lycaenidae

Parelodina is a butterfly genus in the family Lycaenidae. It is monotypic, containing only the species Parelodina aroa. endemic to New Guinea
