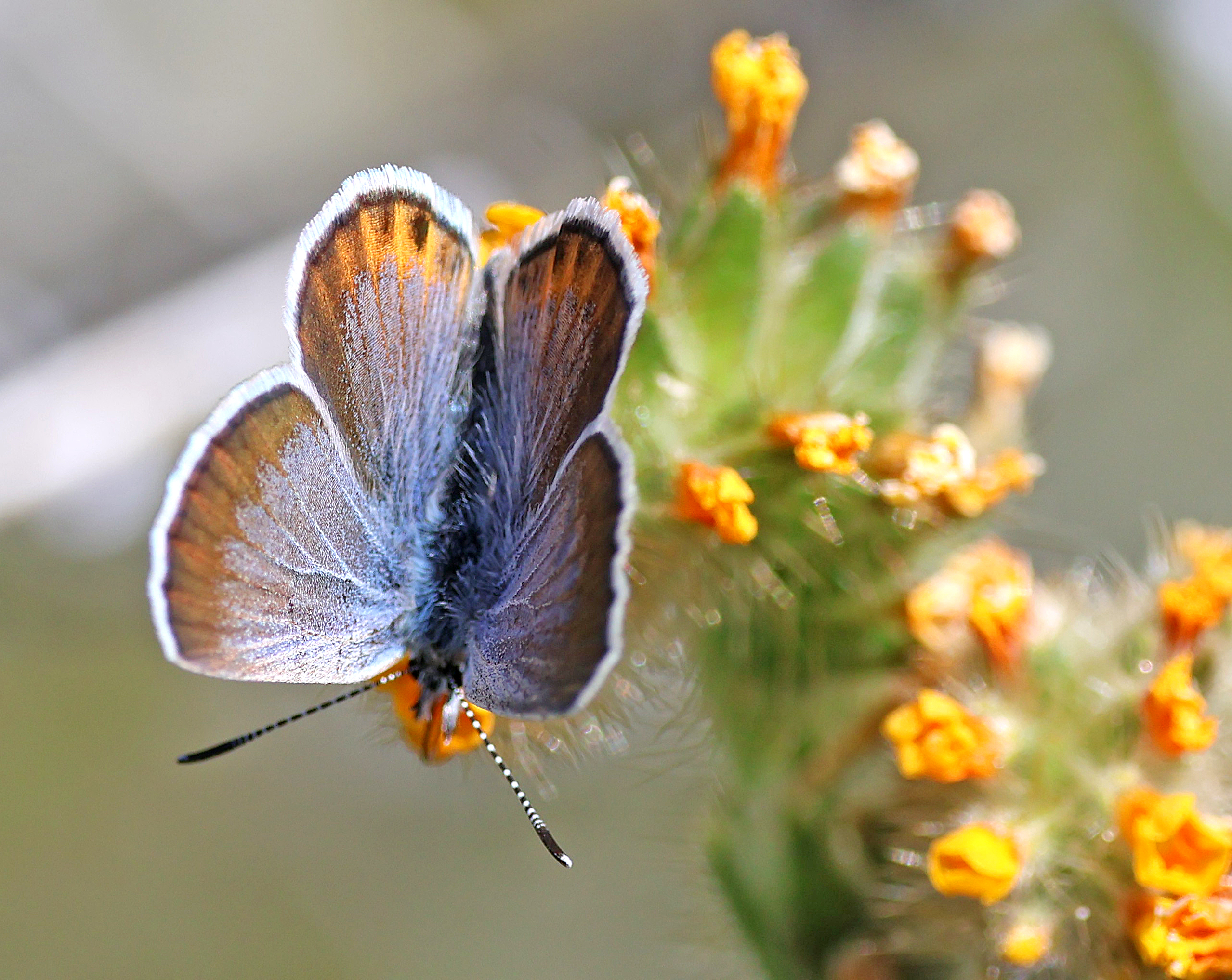
- Image of Plebulina emigdionis

Conservation status
- Critically Imperiled (NatureServe)

Scientific classification
- Kingdom: Animalia
- Phylum: Arthropoda
- Class: Insecta
- Order: Lepidoptera
- Family: Lycaenidae
- Subfamily: Polyommatinae
- Tribe: Polyommatini
- Genus: Plebulina; Nabokov, 1944
- Species: P. emigdionis

Binomial name
- Plebulina emigdionis (Grinnell, 1905)

Synonyms
- Lycaena emigdionis Grinnell, 1905; Plebejus emigdionis (Grinnell, 1905)

= Plebulina =

Species of butterfly

Plebulina emigdionis (formerly known as Plebejus emigdionis), the San Emigdio blue, is a species of blue in the family of butterflies known as Lycaenidae. It is the sole representative of the monotypic genus Plebulina. It is endemic to Southern California.
