= Pseudolucia =

Scientific classification
- Domain: Eukaryota
- Kingdom: Animalia
- Phylum: Arthropoda
- Class: Insecta
- Order: Lepidoptera
- Family: Lycaenidae
- Subfamily: Polyommatinae
- Tribe: Polyommatini
- Genus: Pseudolucia; Nabokov, 1945

Synonyms
- Cherchiella Balletto; Facula Balletto; Pallidula Balletto

Butterfly genus in family Lycaenidae

Pseudolucia is a genus of butterflies in the family Lycaenidae. They are predominantly found in parts of South America, south of Brazil. In many of the southern and western regions, stretching from Chile to Uruguay, habitat loss and pollution have led to near extinction.

== Species ==
- Pseudolucia andina (Bartlett-Calvert, 1894) – Andean blue
- Pseudolucia annamaria Bálint & Johnson, 1993
- Pseudolucia arauco Bálint, Benyamini & Johnson, 2001
- Pseudolucia argentinina (Balletto, 1993) – Argentine blue
- Pseudolucia asafi Benyamini, Bálint & Johnson, 1995
- Pseudolucia avishai Benyamini, Bálint & Johnson, 1995
- Pseudolucia aureliana Bálint & Johnson, 1993
- Pseudolucia benyamini Bálint & Johnson, 1995 – Dubi's blue
- Pseudolucia charlotte Bálint & Johnson, 1993
- Pseudolucia chilensis (Blanchard, 1852)
- Pseudolucia clarea Bálint & Johnson, 1993
- Pseudolucia collina (Philippi, 1859)
- Pseudolucia dubi Bálint, 2001
- Pseudolucia grata (Köhler, 1934)
- Pseudolucia gornia
- Pseudolucia hazearum Bálint & Johnson, 1993
- Pseudolucia henyah Bálint, Benyamini & Johnson, 2001
- Pseudolucia humbert Bálint & Johnson, 1995
- Pseudolucia jujuyensis
- Pseudolucia kechico Bálint, Benyamini & Johnson, 2001
- Pseudolucia kinbote Bálint & Johnson, 1993 – flashing blue or Kinbote's blue
- Pseudolucia lanin Bálint & Johnson, 1993
- Pseudolucia magellana Benyamini, Bálint & Johnson, 1995
- Pseudolucia neuqueniensis Bálint & Johnson, 1995
- Pseudolucia norris
- Pseudolucia oligocyanea (Ureta, 1956) – Tumbre blue
- Pseudolucia oraria Bálint & Benyamini, 2001
- Pseudolucia parana Bálint, 1993
- Pseudolucia patago
- Pseudolucia penai Bálint & Johnson, 1993
- Pseudolucia plumbea (Butler, 1881)
- Pseudolucia scintilla (Balletto, 1993)
- Pseudolucia shapiroi Bálint & Johnson, 1995
- Pseudolucia sibyllia (Kirby, 1871) – southern blue
- Pseudolucia talia Bálint, Benyamini & Johnson, 1995
- Pseudolucia tamara Bálint & Johnson, 1995
- Pseudolucia ugartei Bálint & Benyamini, 2001
- Pseudolucia vera Bálint & Johnson, 1993
- Pseudolucia whitakeri Bálint & Johnson, 1995
- Pseudolucia zina Bálint & Johnson, 1995
