= Otnjukovia =

Scientific classification
- Domain: Eukaryota
- Kingdom: Animalia
- Phylum: Arthropoda
- Class: Insecta
- Order: Lepidoptera
- Family: Lycaenidae
- Subfamily: Polyommatinae
- Tribe: Polyommatini
- Genus: Otnjukovia; Zhdanko, 1997

Butterfly genus in family Lycaenidae

Otnjukovia is a genus of butterflies in the family Lycaenidae. It is monotypic containing only Otnjukovia tatjana (Zhdanko, 1984) from Kazakhstan (Zhetyzhol Mountains, Almaty ).
