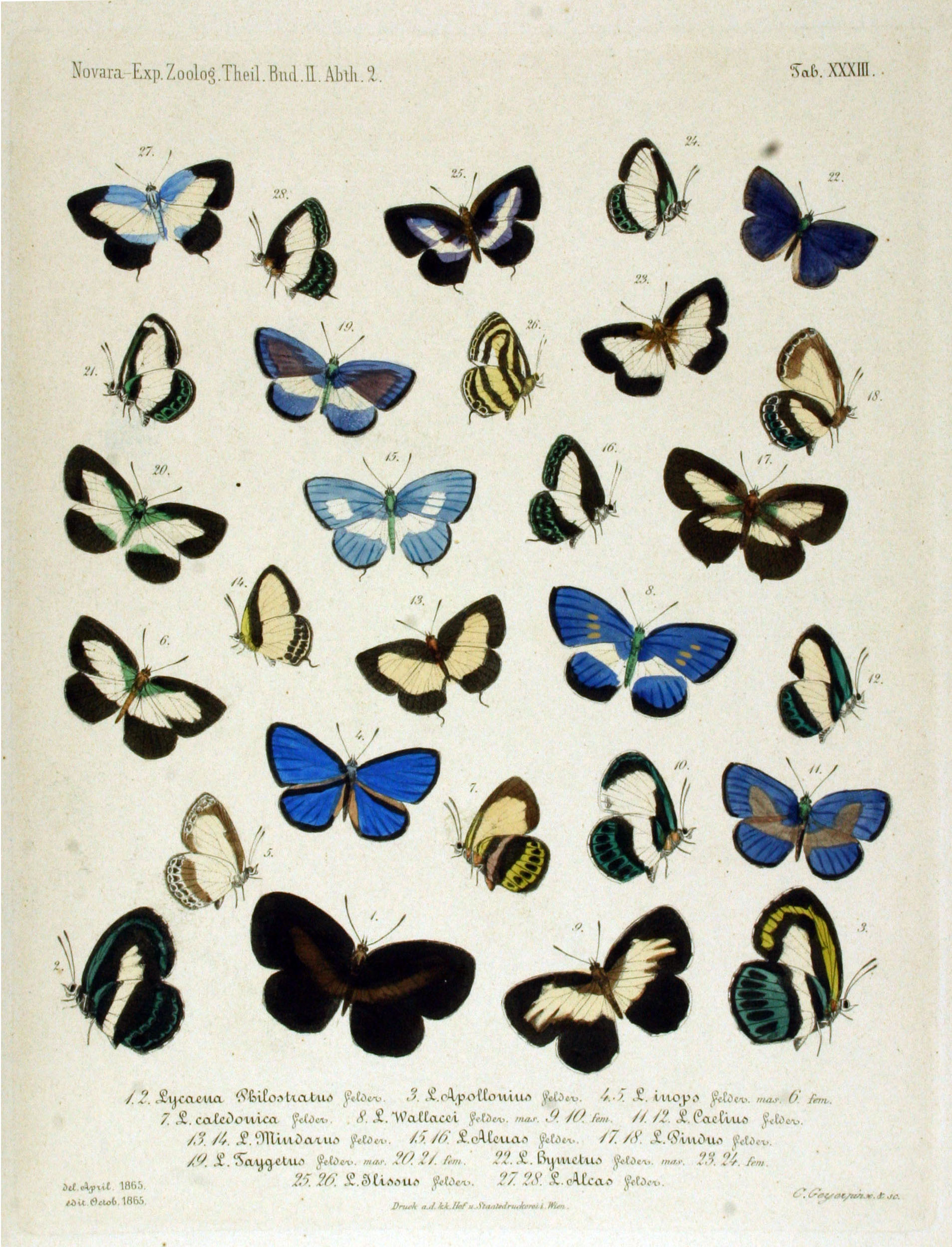
- Epimastidia inops, figures 4 and 5 from Reise Fregatte Novara
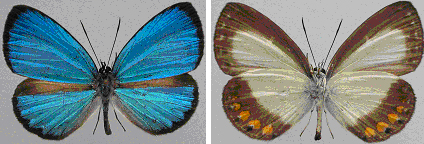
- Epimastidia yiwikana Holotype

Scientific classification
- Domain: Eukaryota
- Kingdom: Animalia
- Phylum: Arthropoda
- Class: Insecta
- Order: Lepidoptera
- Family: Lycaenidae
- Subfamily: Polyommatinae
- Tribe: Polyommatini
- Genus: Epimastidia; H. H. Druce, 1891

= Epimastidia =

Butterfly genus in family Lycaenidae

Epimastidia is a genus of butterflies in the family Lycaenidae first described by Hamilton Herbert Druce in 1891. The species of this genus are found in the Australasian realm. They are

- Epimastidia arienis H. H. Druce, 1891.
- Epimastidia inops (C. Felder & R. Felder, 1860).
- Epimastidia suffuscus Tennent, Müller & Peggie, 2014.
- Epimastidia yiwikana Schröder, S., 2010.
