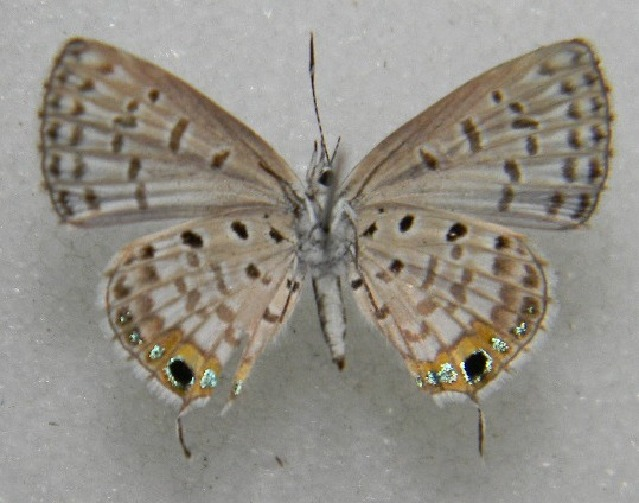

Scientific classification
- Kingdom: Animalia
- Phylum: Arthropoda
- Clade: Pancrustacea
- Class: Insecta
- Order: Lepidoptera
- Family: Lycaenidae
- Subfamily: Polyommatinae
- Tribe: Polyommatini
- Genus: Pseudochrysops; Nabokov, 1945
- Species: P. bornoi

Binomial name
- Pseudochrysops bornoi (Comstock & Huntington, 1943)

Synonyms
- Hemiargus bornoi Comstock & Huntington, 1943

= Pseudochrysops =

Monotypic butterfly genus in family Lycaenidae

Pseudochrysops is a genus of butterflies in the family Lycaenidae. This genus is monotypic, consisting of only one species, Pseudochrysops bornoi, which is endemic to the Greater Antilles (being found on Hispaniola, Puerto Rico and Cuba). It has only been found in Cuba at Yateritas, Guantánamo Province.

== Description ==
The wingspan ranges from 22 to 24 millimeters long. The sexes are generally similar, but the females are larger. It resembles a Theclinae due to the single long tail on each hindwing, but it is definitely a Polyommatinae due to the pattern of spots. The only plants were this species gets its nectar that are known are Acacia farnesiana and Pithecellobium in Cuba.

== Subspecies ==
- Pseudochrysops bornoi bornoi (Hispaniola)
- Pseudochrysops bornoi ecobioi Schwartz, 1987 (Puerto Rico)
- Pseudochrysops bornoi yateritas Smith & Hernández, 1992 (Cuba)
