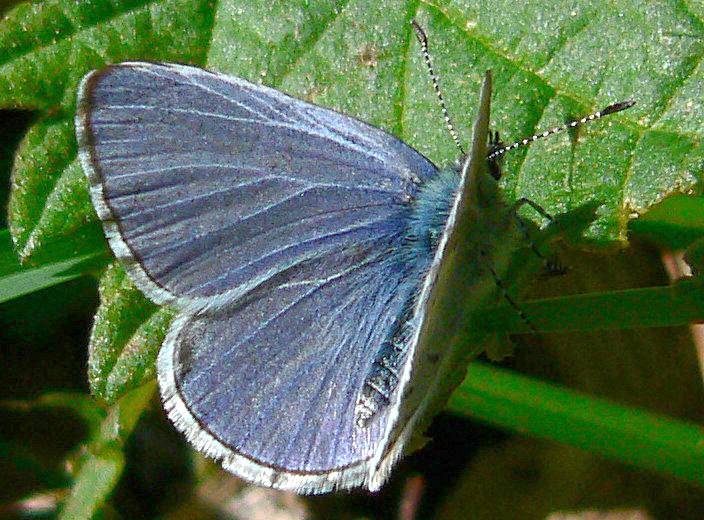
- Spring azure (Celastrina ladon)

Scientific classification
- Kingdom: Animalia
- Phylum: Arthropoda
- Clade: Pancrustacea
- Class: Insecta
- Order: Lepidoptera
- Superfamily: Papilionoidea
- Family: Lycaenidae
- Subfamily: Polyommatinae
- Tribe: Polyommatini; Swainson, 1827

Genera
- See text

= Polyommatini =

Tribe of butterflies

Polyommatini is a tribe of lycaenid butterflies in the subfamily of Polyommatinae. These were extensively studied by Russian-American novelist and lepidopterist Vladimir Nabokov.

== Genera ==
Genera in this tribe include:

- Actizera
- Acytolepis
- Afarsia
- Agriades
- Alpherakya
- Aricia – arguses
- Azanus – babul blues
- Bothrinia
- Brephidium
- Cacyreus
- Caerulea
- Caleta
- Callenya
- Callictita
- Castalius – Pierrots
- Catochrysops
- Catopyrops
- Cebrella
- Celastrina
- Celatoxia
- Chilades – jewel blues
- Cupido
- Cupidopsis – meadow blues
- Cyaniris
- Cyclargus
- Danis
- Discolampa
- Echinargus
- Eicochrysops
- Eldoradina
- Elkalyce
- Epimastidia
- Erysichton
- Euchrysops – Cupids
- Eumedonia
- Euphilotes
- Famegana
- Freyeria
- Glabroculus
- Glaucopsyche
- Grumiana
- Harpendyreus
- Hemiargus
- Icaricia
- Iolana
- Ionolyce
- Itylos
- Jameela
- Jamides – ceruleans
- Kretania
- Lampides
- Lepidochrysops
- Leptotes – zebra blues
- Lestranicus
- Luthrodes
- Lycaenopsis – hedge blues
- Lysandra
- Madeleinea
- Maurus
- Megisba
- Micropsyche
- Monodontides
- Nabokovia
- Nacaduba
- Neolucia
- Neolysandra
- Neopithecops
- Notarthrinus
- Nothodanis
- Oboronia
- Orachrysops
- Oraidium
- Oreolyce
- Orthomiella
- Otnjukovia
- Palaeophilotes
- Pamiria
- Paraduba
- Paralycaeides
- Parelodina
- Patricius
- Perpheres
- Petrelaea
- Phengaris
- Philotes
- Philotiella
- Phlyaria
- Pistoria
- Pithecops
- Plautella
- Plebejidea
- Plebejus
- Plebulina
- Polyommatus
- Praephilotes
- Prosotas
- Pseudochrysops
- Pseudolucia
- Pseudonacaduba
- Pseudophilotes
- Pseudozizeeria
- Psychonotis
- Ptox
- Rhinelephas
- Rimisia
- Rueckbeilia
- Rysops
- Sahulana
- Sancterila
- Scolitantides
- Shijimia
- Sidima
- Sinia
- Sinocupido
- Subsolanoides
- Talicada
- Tartesa
- Tarucus – blue Pierrots
- Thaumaina
- Theclinesthes
- Thermoniphas
- Tongeia
- Turanana
- Tuxentius – pied Pierrots
- Udara
- Una
- Upolampes
- Uranobothria
- Uranothauma
- Zintha – blue-eyed Pierrot
- Zizeeria
- Zizina
- Zizula
