= Micropsyche =

Scientific classification
- Domain: Eukaryota
- Kingdom: Animalia
- Phylum: Arthropoda
- Class: Insecta
- Order: Lepidoptera
- Family: Lycaenidae
- Subfamily: Polyommatinae
- Tribe: Polyommatini
- Genus: Micropsyche; Mattoni, 1978

Butterfly genus in family Lycaenidae

Micropsyche is a genus of butterflies in the family Lycaenidae.
