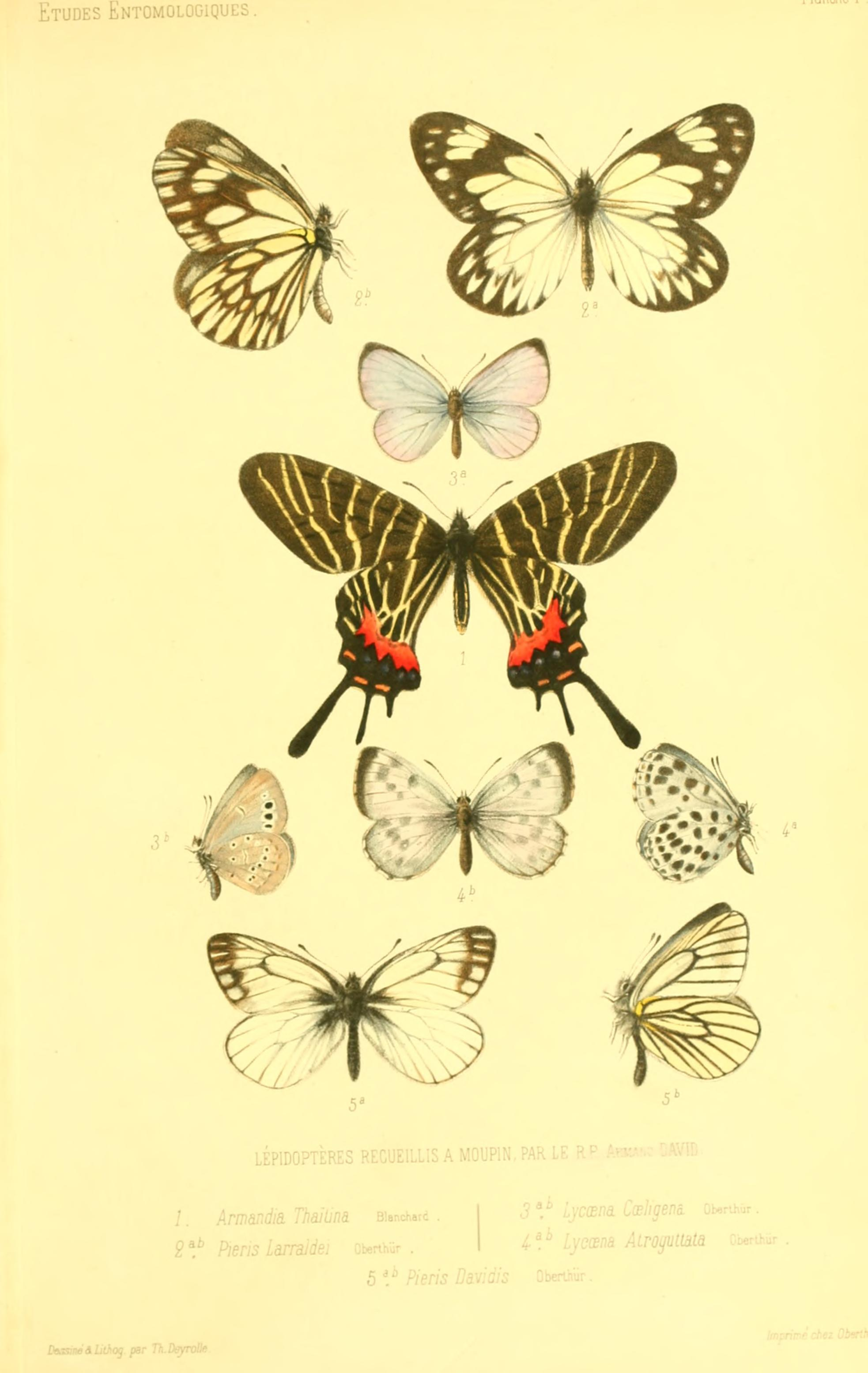
- Caerulea coeligena in Charles Oberthür's Ètudes d'entomologie: Lépidoptères de Chine

Scientific classification
- Domain: Eukaryota
- Kingdom: Animalia
- Phylum: Arthropoda
- Class: Insecta
- Order: Lepidoptera
- Family: Lycaenidae
- Subfamily: Polyommatinae
- Tribe: Polyommatini
- Genus: Caerulea; Forster, 1938

= Caerulea =

Butterfly genus in family Lycaenidae

Caerulea is a genus of butterflies in the family Lycaenidae. It is a small genus with only two species.

- Caerulea coeligena (Oberthür, 1876) western China, central China.
- Caerulea coelestis (Alphéraky, 1897) Tibet, western China
