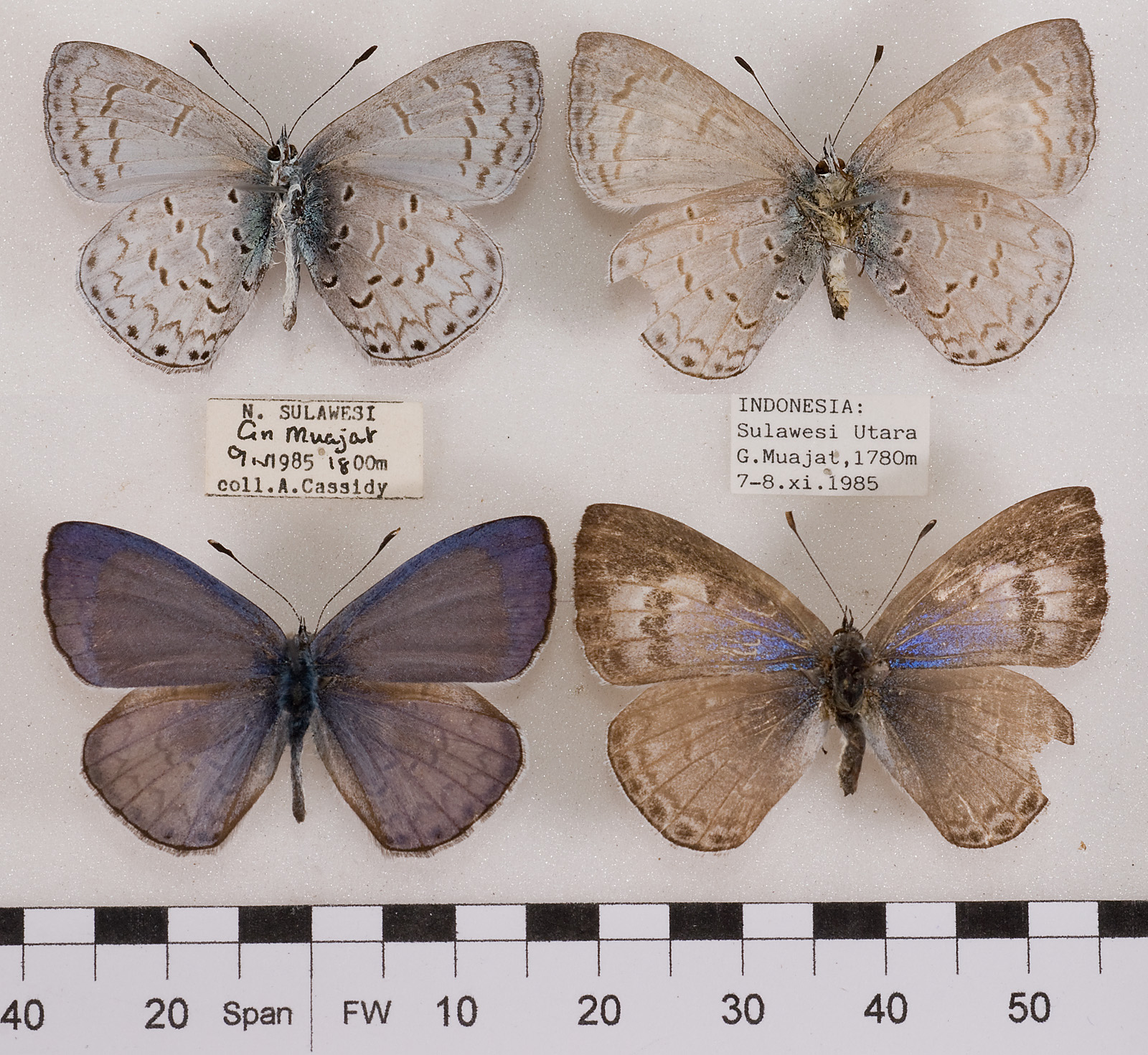
- Uranobothria tsukadai, male and female, North Sulawesi

Scientific classification
- Domain: Eukaryota
- Kingdom: Animalia
- Phylum: Arthropoda
- Class: Insecta
- Order: Lepidoptera
- Family: Lycaenidae
- Subfamily: Polyommatinae
- Tribe: Polyommatini
- Genus: Uranobothria; Toxopeus, 1927

= Uranobothria =

Butterfly genus in family Lycaenidae

Uranobothria is a genus of butterflies in the family Lycaenidae.

== Species ==
- Uranobothria celebica (Fruhstorfer, 1917)
- Uranobothria tsukadai Eliot & Kawazoé, 1983 – Tsukada's hedge blue
