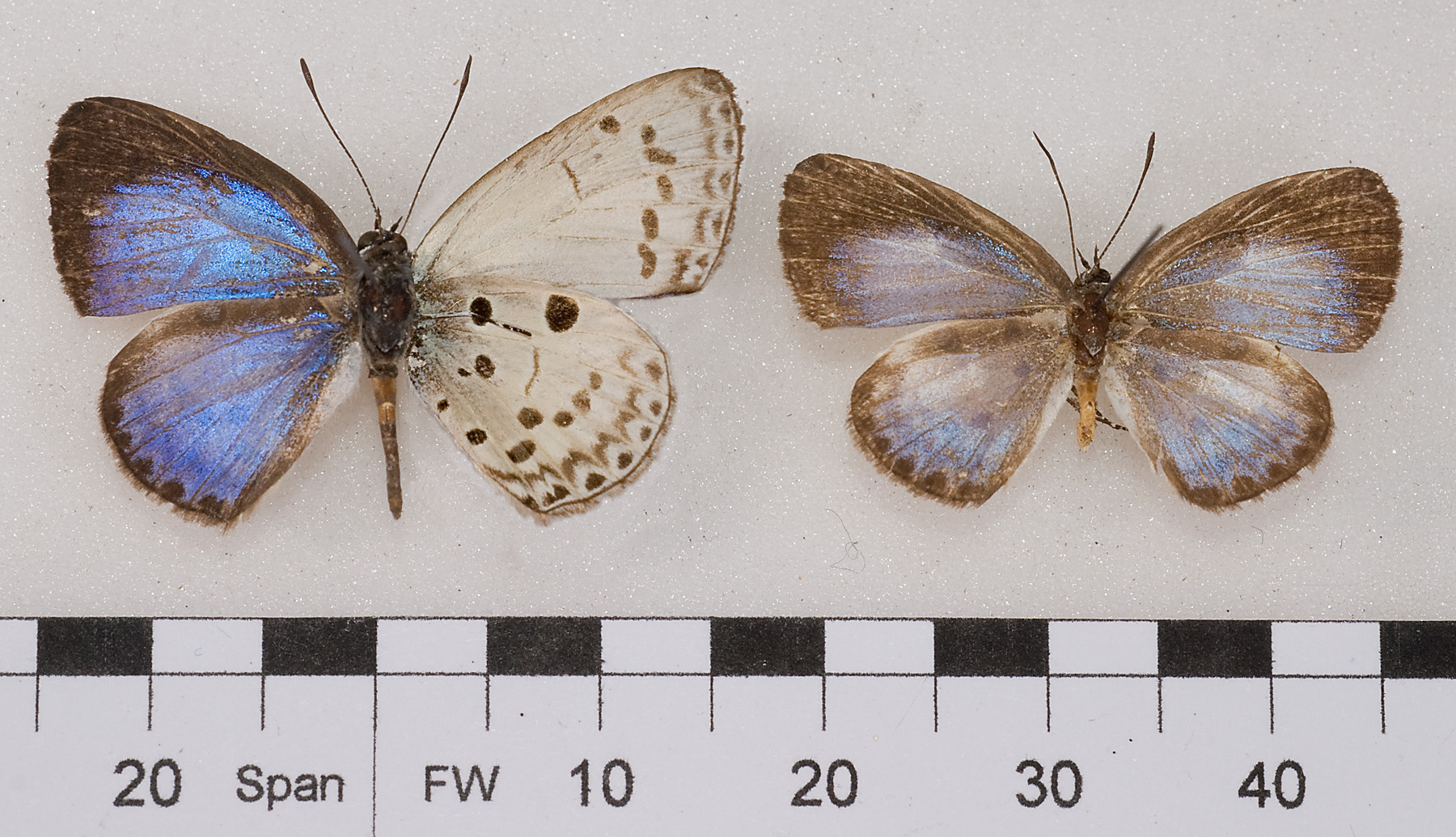
- P. c. pambui
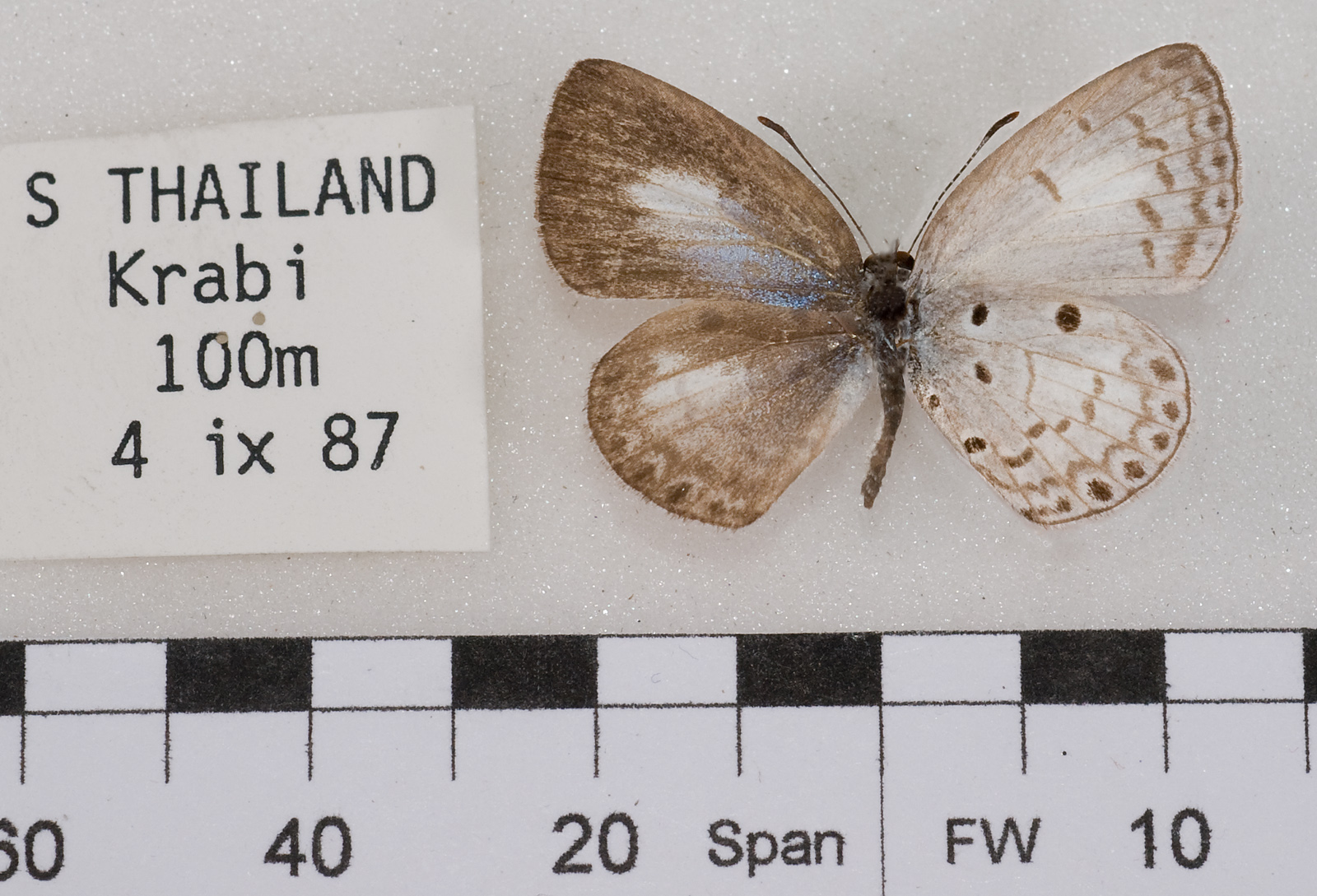
- P. c. sonchus

Scientific classification
- Kingdom: Animalia
- Phylum: Arthropoda
- Clade: Pancrustacea
- Class: Insecta
- Order: Lepidoptera
- Family: Lycaenidae
- Subfamily: Polyommatinae
- Tribe: Polyommatini
- Genus: Plautella; Eliot and Kawazoé, 1983
- Species: P. cossaea

Binomial name
- Plautella cossaea (de Nicéville, 1895)

Synonyms
- see text

= Plautella =

Monotypic butterfly genus in family Lycaenidae

Plautella is a genus of butterflies in the family Lycaenidae. It is a monotypic genus containing Plautella cossaea found in the Indomalayan realm Malaya, Java, Sumatra and Borneo.

== Subspecies ==
- P. c. cossaea (Sumatra)
- P. c. hegesias Fruhstorfer, 1910 (Nias)
- P. c. pambui Eliot, 1973 (southern Burma, Thailand, Malay Peninsula)
- P. c. plauta H.H.Druce, 1895 (Borneo)
- P. c. sabatina Fruhstorfer, 1910 (Java, Sumatra)
- P. c. sonchus H.H. Druce, 1896 (Borneo, Thailand)

== Synonyms ==
- Acytolepis cossaea cossaea
- Acytolepis cossaea sabatina
- Acytolepis plauta
- Celastrina cossaea pambui Eliot, 1973
- Celastrina cossaea sonchus
- Celastrina plauta
- Cyaniris cossaea distanti Fruhstorfer, 1910
- Cyaniris cossaea hegesias Fruhstorfer, 1910
- Cyaniris cossaea plauta
- Cyaniris cossaea sabatina Fruhstorfer, 1910
- Cyaniris cossaea de Nicéville, 1895
- Cyaniris plauta H.H. Druce, 1895
- Cyaniris sonchus H.H. Druce, 1896
- Lycaena cossaea (de Nicéville) Piepers & Snellen, 1918
- Lycaenopis cossaea hegesias
- Lycaenopsis (Lycaenopsis) sonchus
- Lycaenopsis cossaea cossaea
- Lycaenopsis cossaea plauta
- Lycaenopsis cossaea sabatina
- Lycaenopsis plauta
- Lycaenopsis sonchus
