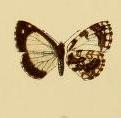

Scientific classification
- Domain: Eukaryota
- Kingdom: Animalia
- Phylum: Arthropoda
- Class: Insecta
- Order: Lepidoptera
- Family: Lycaenidae
- Subfamily: Polyommatinae
- Tribe: Polyommatini
- Genus: Thaumaina; Bethune-Baker, 1908
- Species: T. uranothauma

Binomial name
- Thaumaina uranothauma Bethune-Baker, 1908

= Thaumaina =

Monotypic butterfly genus in family Lycaenidae

Thaumaina is a genus of butterflies in the family Lycaenidae. It is monotypic, containing the single species Thaumaina uranothauma.
