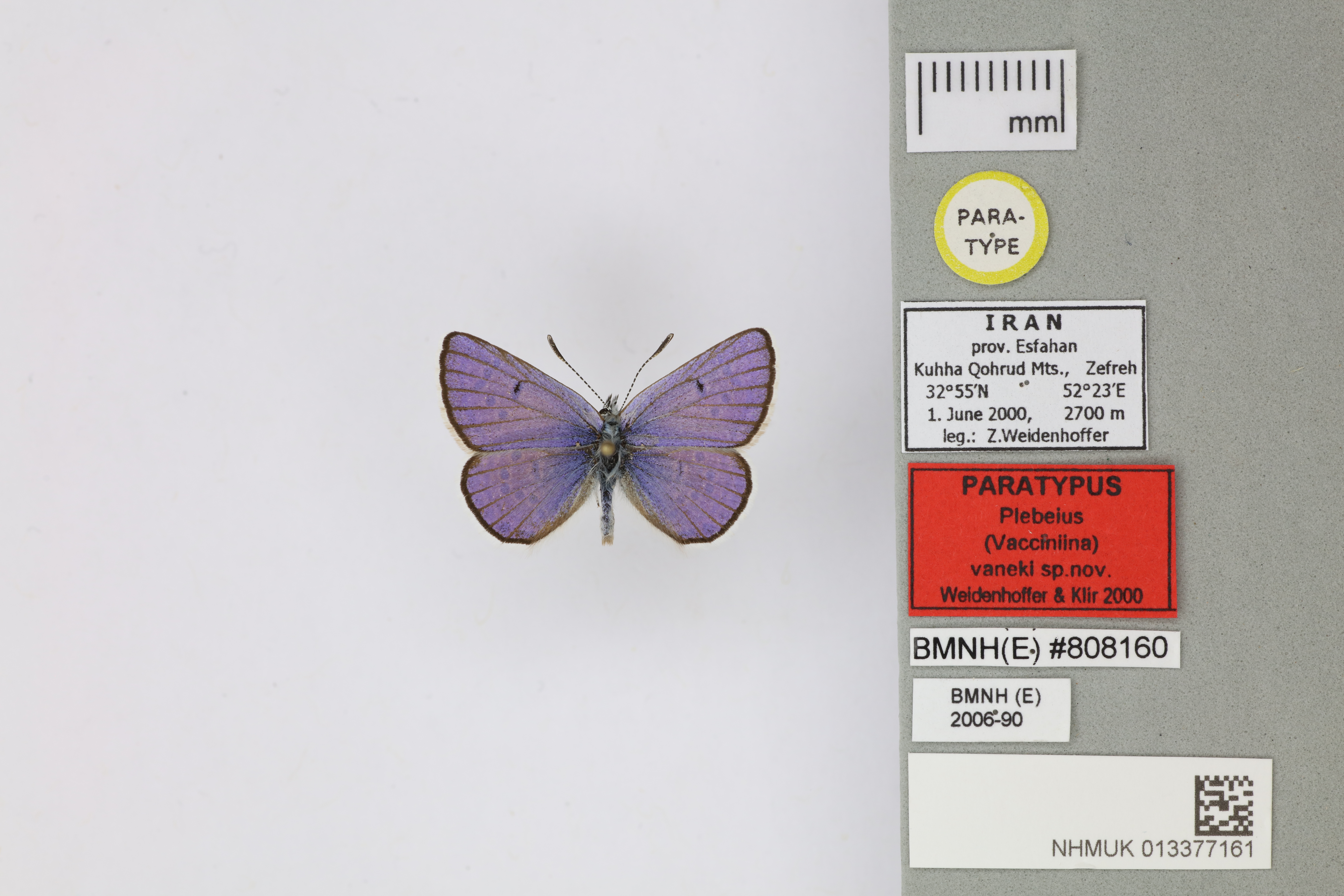
- Afarsia morgiana vaneki

Scientific classification
- Kingdom: Animalia
- Phylum: Arthropoda
- Class: Insecta
- Order: Lepidoptera
- Family: Lycaenidae
- Subfamily: Polyommatinae
- Tribe: Polyommatini
- Genus: Afarsia; Korb & Bolshakov, 2011

Synonyms
- Farsia Zhdanko, 1992 (preocc. Amsel, 1961)

= Afarsia =

Genus of butterflies

Afarsia is a Palearctic genus of butterflies in the family Lycaenidae.It has been synonymized with Albulina by some authors, but studies on the molecular phylogenetics of Polyommatini have led to its treatment as an independent genus, which appears as the sister group of the genus Kretania sensu lato, with weak support.

== Species ==
Listed alphabetically:

- Afarsia antoninae (Lukhtanov, 1999) Tian Shan
- Afarsia ashretha (Evans, 1925) Tajikistan, Pakistan
- Afarsia hanna (Evans, 1932) Tajikistan, Pakistan, Afghanistan.
- Afarsia iris (Lang, 1884) sometimes considered a subspecies of Afarsia sieversii.
- Afarsia jurii (Tshikolovets, 1997) sometimes considered a subspecies of Afarsia rutilans.
- Afarsia morgiana (Kirby, 1871) Armenia, Turkey, Iran
- Afarsia neoiris (Tshikolovets, 1997) Tajikistan
- Afarsia omotoi (Forster, 1972) Afghanistan
- Afarsia rutilans (Staudinger, 1886) Alay mountains
- Afarsia sieversii (Christoph, 1873) Iran, Turkestan, Pamir
