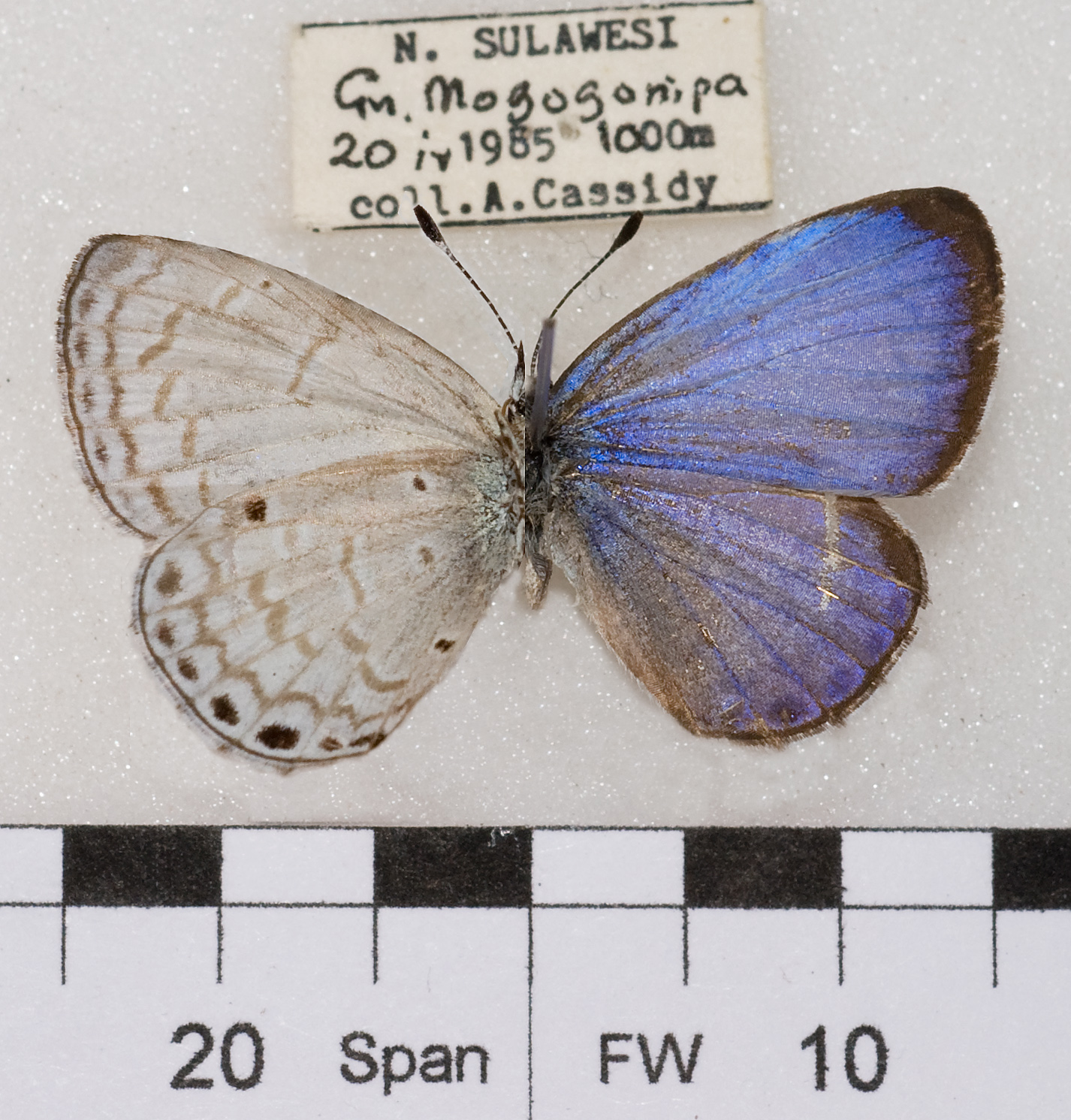
- Sidima sulawesiana

Scientific classification
- Domain: Eukaryota
- Kingdom: Animalia
- Phylum: Arthropoda
- Class: Insecta
- Order: Lepidoptera
- Family: Lycaenidae
- Subfamily: Polyommatinae
- Tribe: Polyommatini
- Genus: Sidima; Eliot & Kawazoé, 1983

= Sidima =

Butterfly genus in family Lycaenidae

Sidima is a genus of butterflies in the family Lycaenidae.

== Species ==
- Sidima idamis (Fruhstorfer, 1917) Sumatra
- Sidima murayamai Eliot & Kawazoé, 1983 Philippines
- Sidima sulawesiana Eliot & Kawazoé, 1983 Celebes
- Sidima amarylde Eliot & Kawazoé, 1983 New Guinea
