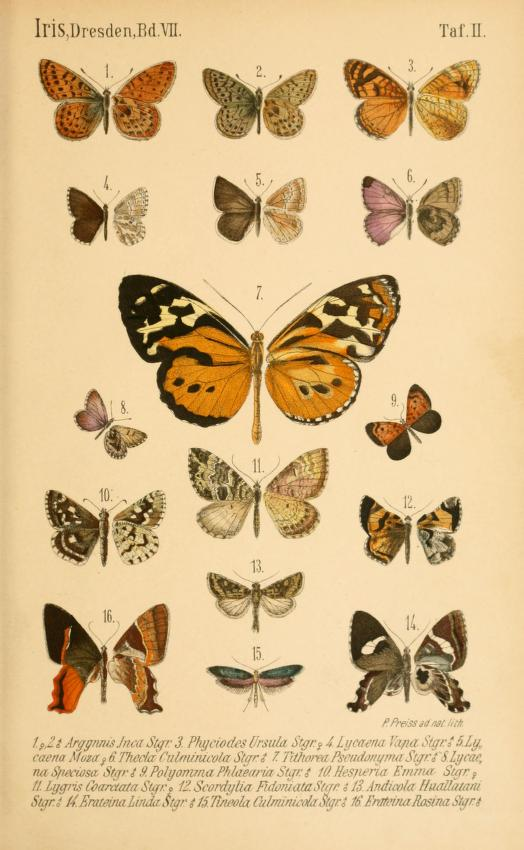
- Paralycaeides vapa (Staudinger, 1894) and other Lepidoptera

Scientific classification
- Domain: Eukaryota
- Kingdom: Animalia
- Phylum: Arthropoda
- Class: Insecta
- Order: Lepidoptera
- Family: Lycaenidae
- Subfamily: Polyommatinae
- Tribe: Polyommatini
- Genus: Paralycaeides; Nabokov, 1945

Synonyms
- Boliviella Balletto, 1993

= Paralycaeides =

Butterfly genus in family Lycaenidae

Paralycaeides is a Neotropical genus of butterfly in the family Lycaenidae.

== Species ==
- Paralycaeides inconspicua (Draudt, 1921) Central and South Peru (high Andes)
- Paralycaeides shade Bálint, 1993 Central Peru (high Andes)
- Paralycaeides vapa (Staudinger, 1894) South Peru, Bolivia, Northeast Chile, Argentina, North Patagonia (high Andes)
