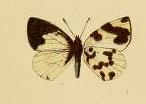

Scientific classification
- Domain: Eukaryota
- Kingdom: Animalia
- Phylum: Arthropoda
- Class: Insecta
- Order: Lepidoptera
- Family: Lycaenidae
- Subfamily: Polyommatinae
- Tribe: Polyommatini
- Genus: Pistoria; Hemming, 1964
- Species: P. nigropunctata

Binomial name
- Pistoria nigropunctata (Bethune-Baker, 1908)

Synonyms
- Mambara Bethune-Baker, 1908 (preocc.); Mambara nigropunctata Bethune-Baker, 1908

= Pistoria =

Monotypic butterfly genus in family Lycaenidae

Pistoria is a genus of butterflies in the family Lycaenidae. The single species of this monotypic genus, Pistoria nigropunctata, is found in New Guinea (Australasian realm).

== Subspecies ==
- P. n. nigropunctata (south-western New Guinea: Upper Waria Ranges, Papua New Guinea: Mambare)
- P. n. siwiensis Tite, 1962 (West Irian: Mount Siwi)
- P. n. weylandia Tite, 1962 (West Irian: Weyland Mountains)
- P. n. aroa Tite, 1962 (southern Papua New Guinea: Aroa)
- P. n. fracta Tite, 1962 (New Guinea: Rawlinson Mountains)
- P. n. kratke Tite, 1962 (New Guinea: Kratke Mountains)
