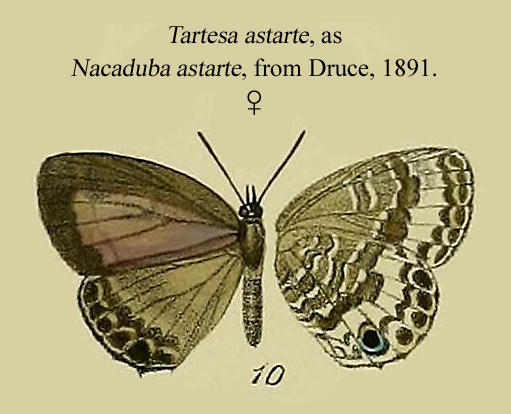
- Tartesa astarte, female

Scientific classification
- Domain: Eukaryota
- Kingdom: Animalia
- Phylum: Arthropoda
- Class: Insecta
- Order: Lepidoptera
- Family: Lycaenidae
- Subfamily: Polyommatinae
- Tribe: Polyommatini
- Genus: Tartesa; Hirowatari, T. 1992

= Tartesa =

Butterfly genus in family Lycaenidae

Tartesa is an Australasian realm genus of butterflies in the family Lycaenidae.

== Species ==
- Tartesa astarte (Butler, 1882)
- Tartesa ugiensis (Druce, 1891)
