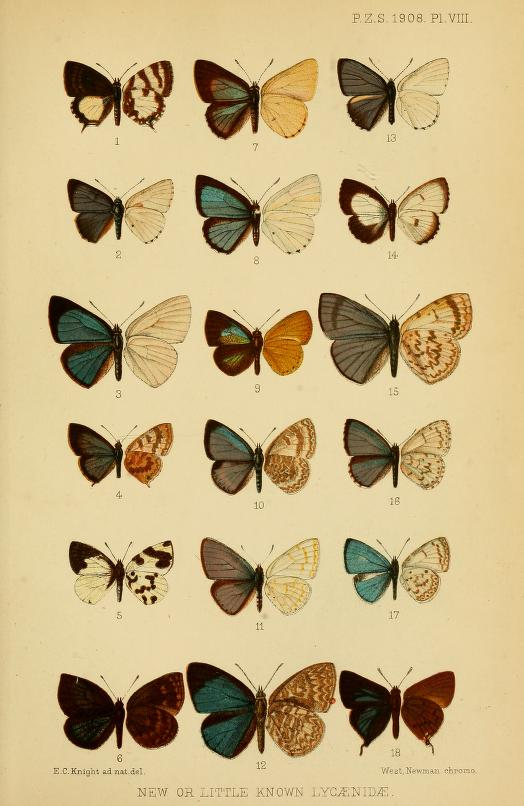
- Paraduba owgarra figure 4

Scientific classification
- Domain: Eukaryota
- Kingdom: Animalia
- Phylum: Arthropoda
- Class: Insecta
- Order: Lepidoptera
- Family: Lycaenidae
- Subfamily: Polyommatinae
- Tribe: Polyommatini
- Genus: Paraduba; Bethune-Baker, 1906

= Paraduba =

Butterfly genus in family Lycaenidae

Paraduba is a genus of butterflies in the family Lycaenidae. The species of this genus are found in New Guinea (Australasian realm).

== Species ==
- Paraduba metriodes Bethune-Baker, 1911
- Paraduba owgarra Bethune-Baker, 1906
- Paraduba siwiensis Tite, 1963
