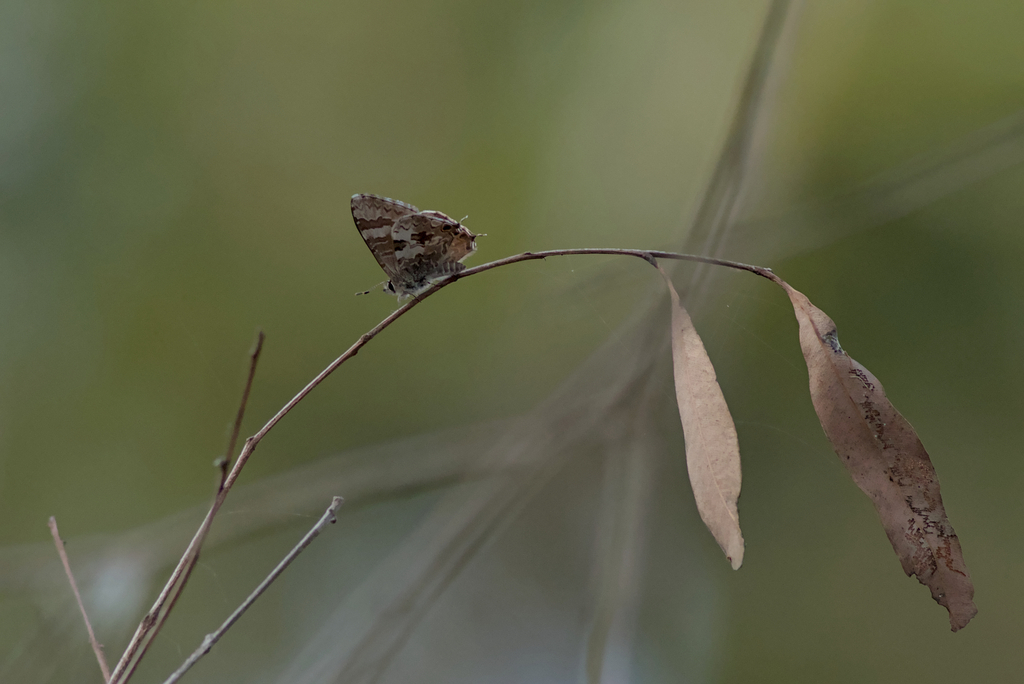

Scientific classification
- Kingdom: Animalia
- Phylum: Arthropoda
- Clade: Pancrustacea
- Class: Insecta
- Order: Lepidoptera
- Family: Lycaenidae
- Subfamily: Polyommatinae
- Tribe: Polyommatini
- Genus: Sahulana; Hirowatari, 1992
- Species: S. scintillata

Binomial name
- Sahulana scintillata (T. P. Lucas, 1889)

= Sahulana =

Monotypic butterfly genus in family Lycaenidae

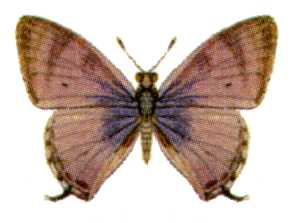

Sahulana is a genus of butterflies in the family Lycaenidae erected by Toshiya Hirowatari in 1992. It is monotypic, containing only the species Sahulana scintillata, which was first described by Thomas Pennington Lucas in 1889. It is found on Torres Strait Island and in the Australian state of New South Wales. Larval food plants include Acacia, Alectryon and Cupaniopsis (flower buds).
