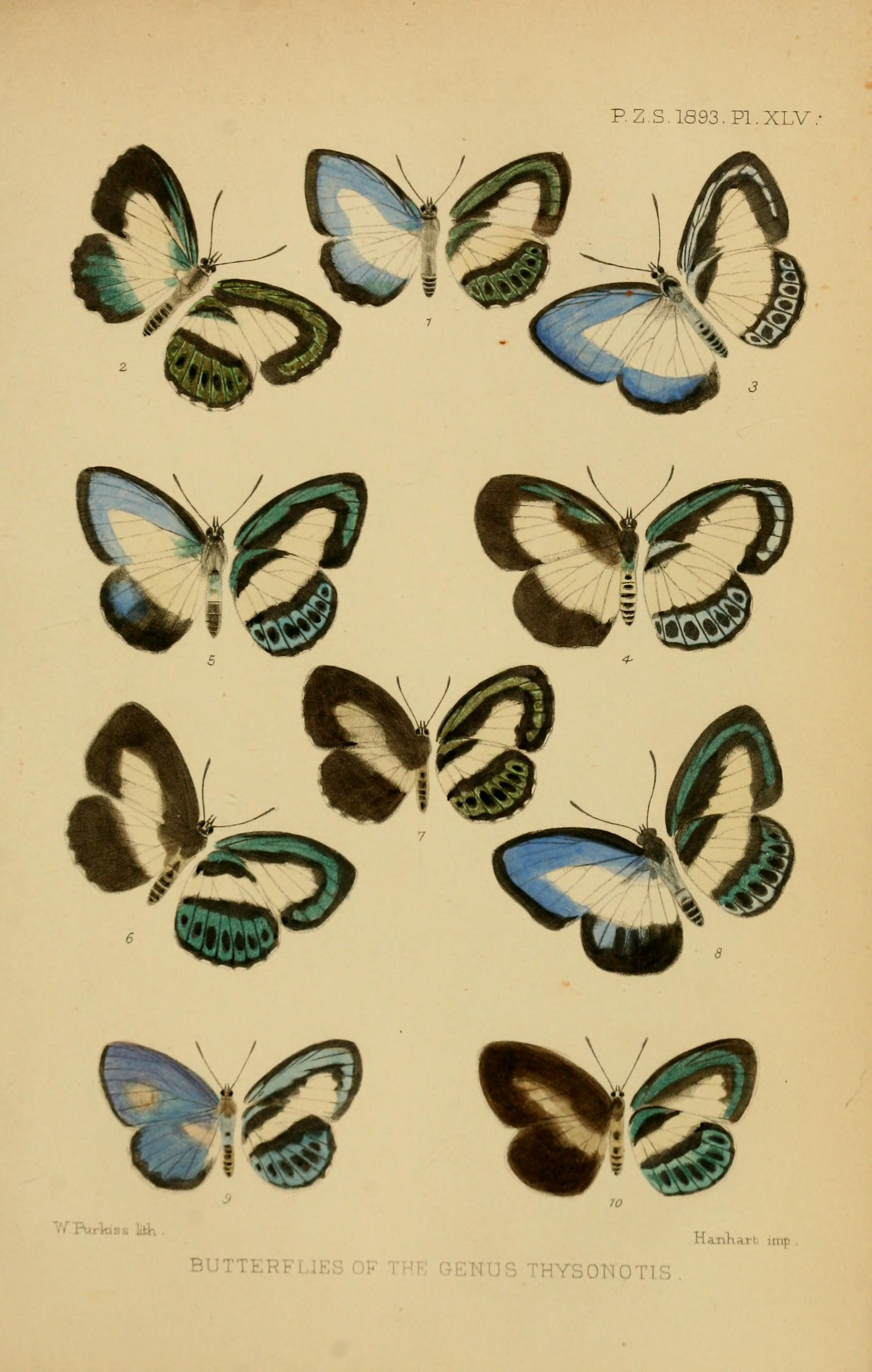
- Figs. 9, 10

Scientific classification
- Domain: Eukaryota
- Kingdom: Animalia
- Phylum: Arthropoda
- Class: Insecta
- Order: Lepidoptera
- Family: Lycaenidae
- Subfamily: Polyommatinae
- Tribe: Polyommatini
- Genus: Perpheres; Hirowatari, 1992

= Perpheres =

Butterfly genus in family Lycaenidae

Perpheres is a genus of butterflies in the family Lycaenidae. It is monotypic containing only Perpheres perpheres (H. H. Druce and Bethune-Baker, 1893) endemic to New Guinea.This species was previously in Danis.
