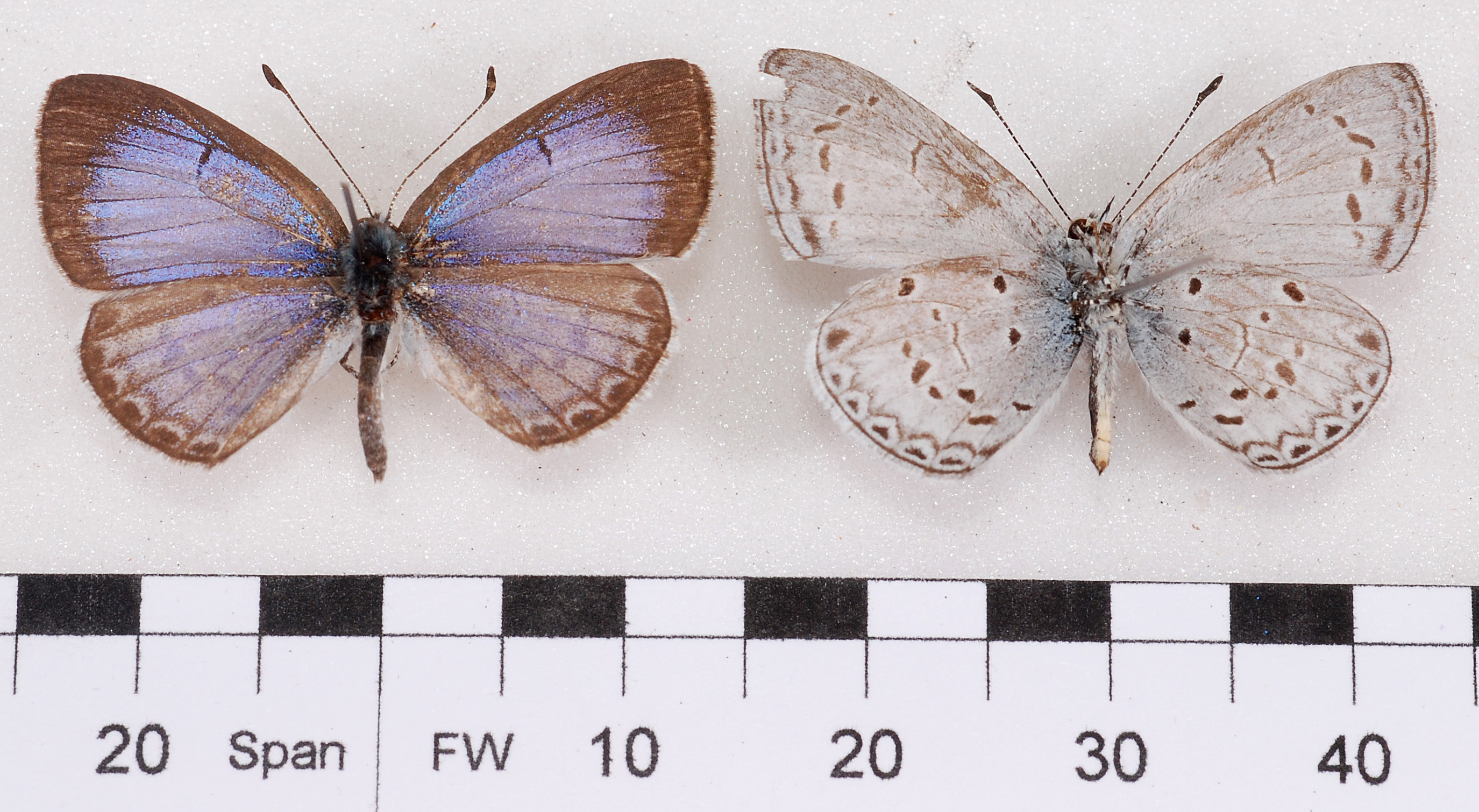
- Sancterila (Armentulus) shelfordii

Scientific classification
- Kingdom: Animalia
- Phylum: Arthropoda
- Clade: Pancrustacea
- Class: Insecta
- Order: Lepidoptera
- Family: Lycaenidae
- Subfamily: Polyommatinae
- Tribe: Polyommatini
- Genus: Sancterila; Eliot & Kawazoé, 1983

= Sancterila =

Genus of butterflies

Sancterila is a genus of butterflies in the family Lycaenidae.

It contains three subgenera: Sancterila, Celarchus, and Armentulus. Celarchus was originally described as a distinct genus, of which Armentulus was a subgenus.

The nominotypical subgenus Sancterila contains four species endemic to Sulawesi and one species endemic to Buru and Ambon.

== Species ==
Subgenus Sancterila Eliot & Kawazoé, 1983

- Sancterila deliciosa (Pagenstecher, 1896)
- Sancterila prattorum Eliot & Kawazoé, 1983
- Sancterila drakei Cassidy, 1995
- Sancterila russelli Eliot & Kawazoé, 1983

Subgenus Celarchus Eliot & Kawazoé, 1983

- Sancterila archagathos (Fruhstorfer, 1910)
- Sancterila hermarchus (Fruhstorfer, 1910)

Subgenus Armentulus Eliot & Kawazoé, 1983

- Sancterila shelfordii (de Nicéville, 1902)
