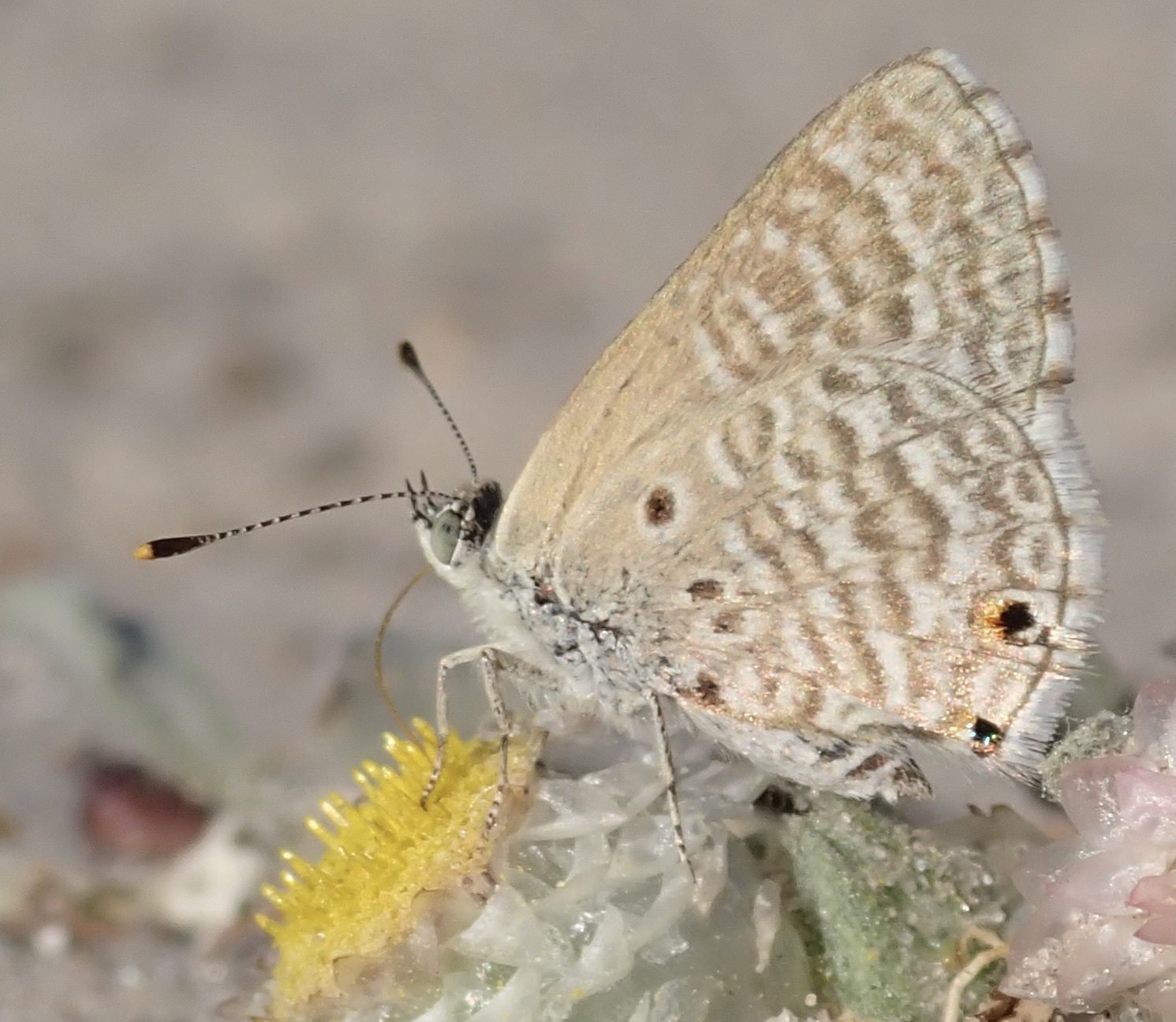
- Anthene dulcis

Scientific classification
- Kingdom: Animalia
- Phylum: Arthropoda
- Class: Insecta
- Order: Lepidoptera
- Superfamily: Papilionoidea
- Family: Lycaenidae
- Subfamily: Polyommatinae
- Tribe: Lycaenesthini; Toxopeus, 1929

Genera
- See text

= Lycaenesthini =

Tribe of butterflies

Lycaenesthini is a tribe of lycaenid butterflies in the subfamily Polyommatinae.

== Genera ==
- Anthene Doubleday, 1847 − ciliate blues or hairtails
- Cupidesthes Aurivillius, 1895
