= Rhinelephas =

Scientific classification
- Domain: Eukaryota
- Kingdom: Animalia
- Phylum: Arthropoda
- Class: Insecta
- Order: Lepidoptera
- Family: Lycaenidae
- Subfamily: Polyommatinae
- Tribe: Polyommatini
- Genus: Rhinelephas; Toxopeus, 1927

Butterfly genus in family Lycaenidae

Rhinelephas is a genus of butterflies in the family Lycaenidae.

== Species ==
- Rhinelephas arrhina Toxopeus, 1928
- Rhinelephas cyanicornis (Snellen, 1892)
