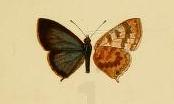

Scientific classification
- Domain: Eukaryota
- Kingdom: Animalia
- Phylum: Arthropoda
- Class: Insecta
- Order: Lepidoptera
- Family: Lycaenidae
- Genus: Paraduba
- Species: P. owgarra

Binomial name
- Paraduba owgarra Bethune-Baker, 1906

= Paraduba owgarra =

Species of butterfly

Paraduba owgarra is a species of butterfly of the family Lycaenidae. It is found in New Guinea.
