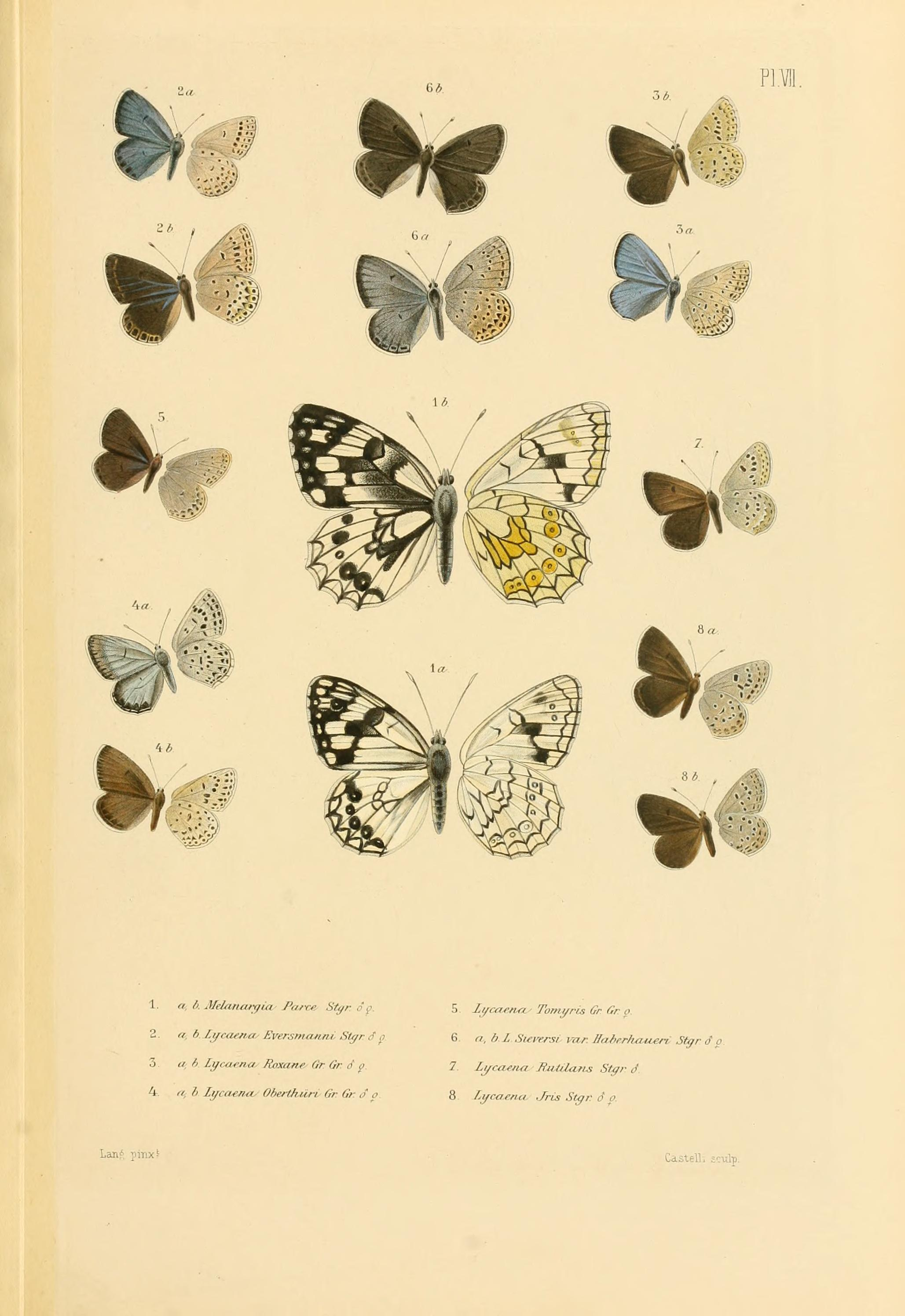
- Glabroculus elvira as Lycaena oberthüri Grum-Grshimailo, 1887 (4a male, 4b female)

Scientific classification
- Kingdom: Animalia
- Phylum: Arthropoda
- Clade: Pancrustacea
- Class: Insecta
- Order: Lepidoptera
- Family: Lycaenidae
- Subfamily: Polyommatinae
- Tribe: Polyommatini
- Genus: Glabroculus; Lvovsky, 1993

Synonyms
- Elviria Zhdanko, 1994

= Glabroculus =

Butterfly genus in family Lycaenidae

Glabroculus is a Palearctic genus of butterflies in the family Lycaenidae. It contains two described species. The larvae of Glabroculus are associated with plants of the family Limoniaceae.

The two species include:

- Glabroculus cyane (Eversmann, 1837) Urals, Turan, Tian-Shan, Ghissar, Darvaz, Pamirs-Alai, Saur, Tarbagatai, South Altai, Transbaikalia, Mongolia.
- Glabroculus elvira (Eversmann, 1854) Kazakhstan, Kyrgyzstan.

== Classification ==
Glabroculus was originally described by Lvovsky in 1993 as a subgenus of Polyommatus. Subsequent molecular phylogenetic studies confirmed that Glabroculus does not belong within Polyommatus, and it is treated as a distinct genus. Elviria Zhdanko, 1994, listed as a synonym in the article, was also included by some authors within Polyommatus before the molecular evidence clarified its placement.
