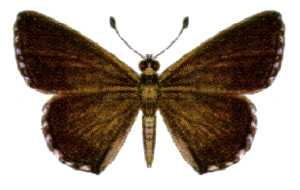
- Neolucia agricola

Scientific classification
- Domain: Eukaryota
- Kingdom: Animalia
- Phylum: Arthropoda
- Class: Insecta
- Order: Lepidoptera
- Family: Lycaenidae
- Subfamily: Polyommatinae
- Tribe: Polyommatini
- Genus: Neolucia; Waterhouse & Turner, 1905

= Neolucia =

Butterfly genus in family Lycaenidae

Neolucia is a genus of butterflies in the family Lycaenidae. The three species of this genus are endemic to Australia and Tasmania.

== Species ==
The following species are recognised:

- Neolucia agricola (Westwood, [1851])
- Neolucia mathewi (Miskin, 1890)
- Neolucia hobartensis (Miskin, 1890)
