= Rueckbeilia =

Scientific classification
- Domain: Eukaryota
- Kingdom: Animalia
- Phylum: Arthropoda
- Class: Insecta
- Order: Lepidoptera
- Family: Lycaenidae
- Subfamily: Polyommatinae
- Tribe: Polyommatini
- Genus: Rueckbeilia; Talavera, Lukhtanov, Pierce & Vila, 2013

Butterfly genus in family Lycaenidae

Rueckbeilia is a genus of butterflies in the family Lycaenidae, first described in 2013.

It contains two species:

- Rueckbeilia fergana (Staudinger, 1881)
- Rueckbeilia rosei (Eckweiler, 1989)
