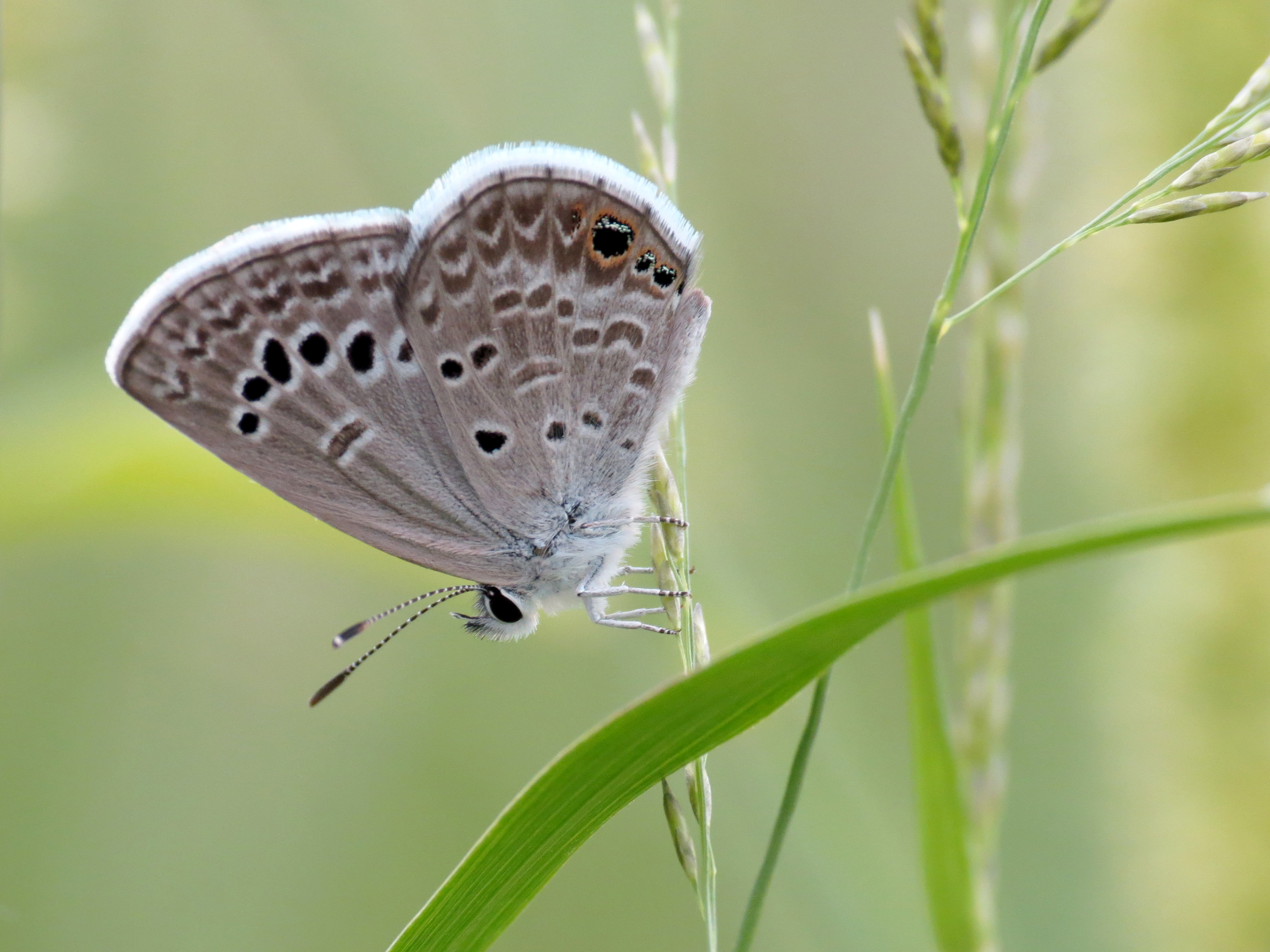

Scientific classification
- Kingdom: Animalia
- Phylum: Arthropoda
- Clade: Pancrustacea
- Class: Insecta
- Order: Lepidoptera
- Family: Lycaenidae
- Tribe: Polyommatini
- Genus: Echinargus; Nabokov, 1945
- Species: E. isola

Binomial name
- Echinargus isola (Reakirt, [1867])

Synonyms
- Lycaena isola Reakirt, [1867]; Hemiargus isola; Lycaena nyagora Boisduval, 1870; Lycaena alce Edwards, 1871

= Echinargus =

Reakirt's blue

Species of butterfly

Echinargus isola, or Reakirt's blue, is a butterfly of the family Lycaenidae. It is the sole representative of the monotypic genus Echinargus. It is found in Central America and the extreme southern U.S. Echinargus isola migrates regularly throughout most of the U.S. almost to the Canada–United States border, and very rarely into the southern prairies.

The wingspan is 16–23 mm. Adults are on wing from June to October in the north and year-round in south. Its habitats include fields, gardens, open areas, and host plants.

The larvae feed on Fabaceae, particularly mesquites (Prosopis species). Adults feed on flower nectar from spearmint, white sweet clover, and a variety of other herbs.

== Subspecies ==
- Echinargus isola isola
- Echinargus isola alce (Edwards, 1871) (Colorado)
