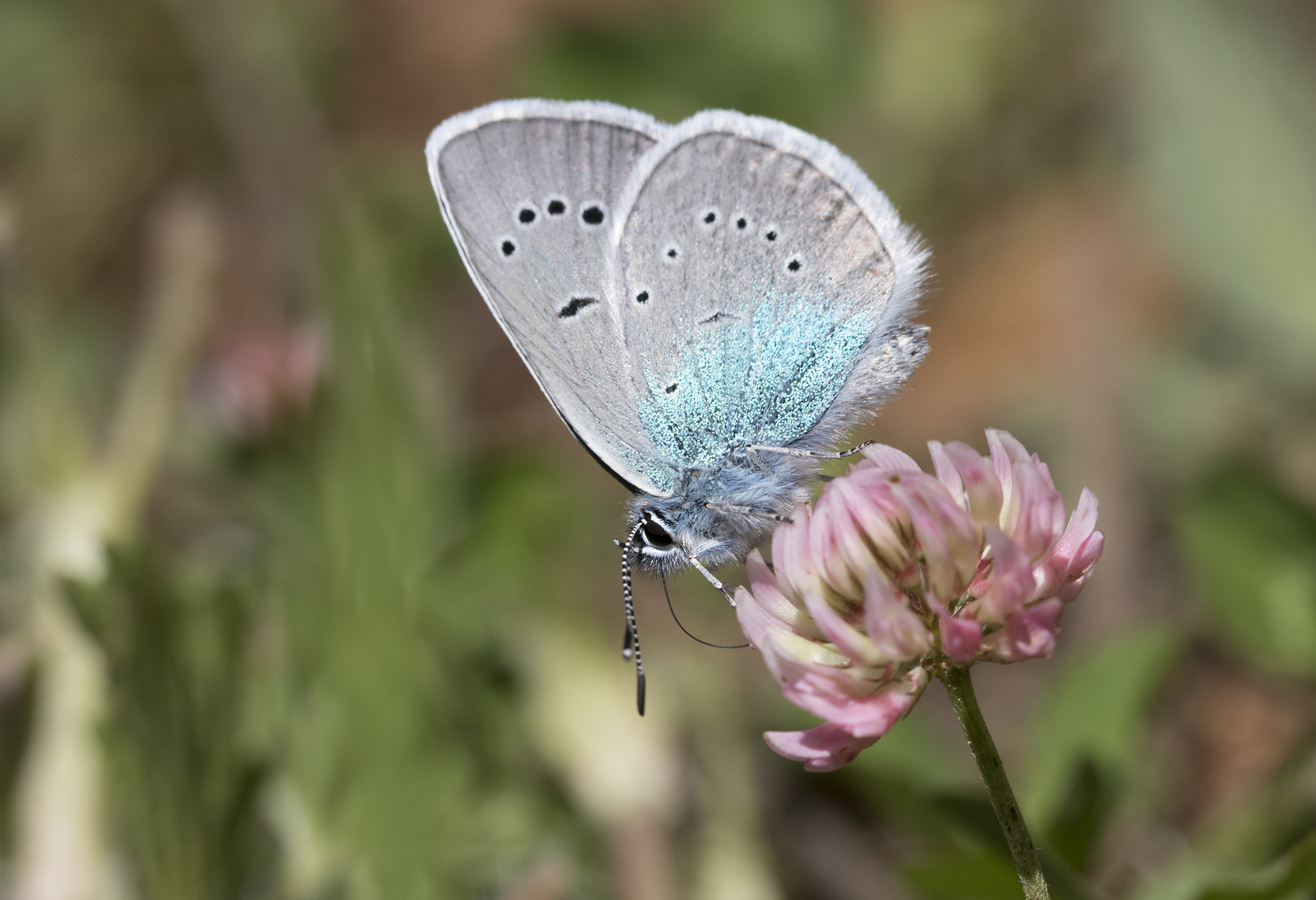
- Neolysandra coelestina

Scientific classification
- Domain: Eukaryota
- Kingdom: Animalia
- Phylum: Arthropoda
- Class: Insecta
- Order: Lepidoptera
- Family: Lycaenidae
- Subfamily: Polyommatinae
- Tribe: Polyommatini
- Genus: Neolysandra; Koçak, 1977

= Neolysandra =

Genus of butterflies

Neolysandra is a Palearctic genus of butterflies in the family Lycaenidae.

== Species ==
Listed alphabetically:

- Neolysandra coelestina (Eversmann, 1843)
- Neolysandra corona (Verity, 1936) Lebanon
- Neolysandra diana (Miller, [1913]) Kurdistan
- Neolysandra ellisoni (Pfeiffer, 1931) Syria and Alborz mountains
- Neolysandra fatima Eckweiler & Schurian, 1980 Kurdistan
- Neolysandra fereiduna Skala, 2002 Iran
