= Notarthrinus =

Chapman's hedge blue

Scientific classification
- Domain: Eukaryota
- Kingdom: Animalia
- Phylum: Arthropoda
- Class: Insecta
- Order: Lepidoptera
- Family: Lycaenidae
- Subfamily: Polyommatinae
- Tribe: Polyommatini
- Genus: Notarthrinus; Chapman, 1908
- Species: N. binghami

Binomial name
- Notarthrinus binghami Chapman, 1908

Synonyms
- Lycaenopsis binghami (Chapman, 1908)

Monotypic butterfly genus in family Lycaenidae

Notarthrinus is a butterfly genus in the family Lycaenidae. It is monotypic, containing only Notarthrinus binghami, the Chapman's hedge blue, a small butterfly found from Assam in India to northern Myanmar.
