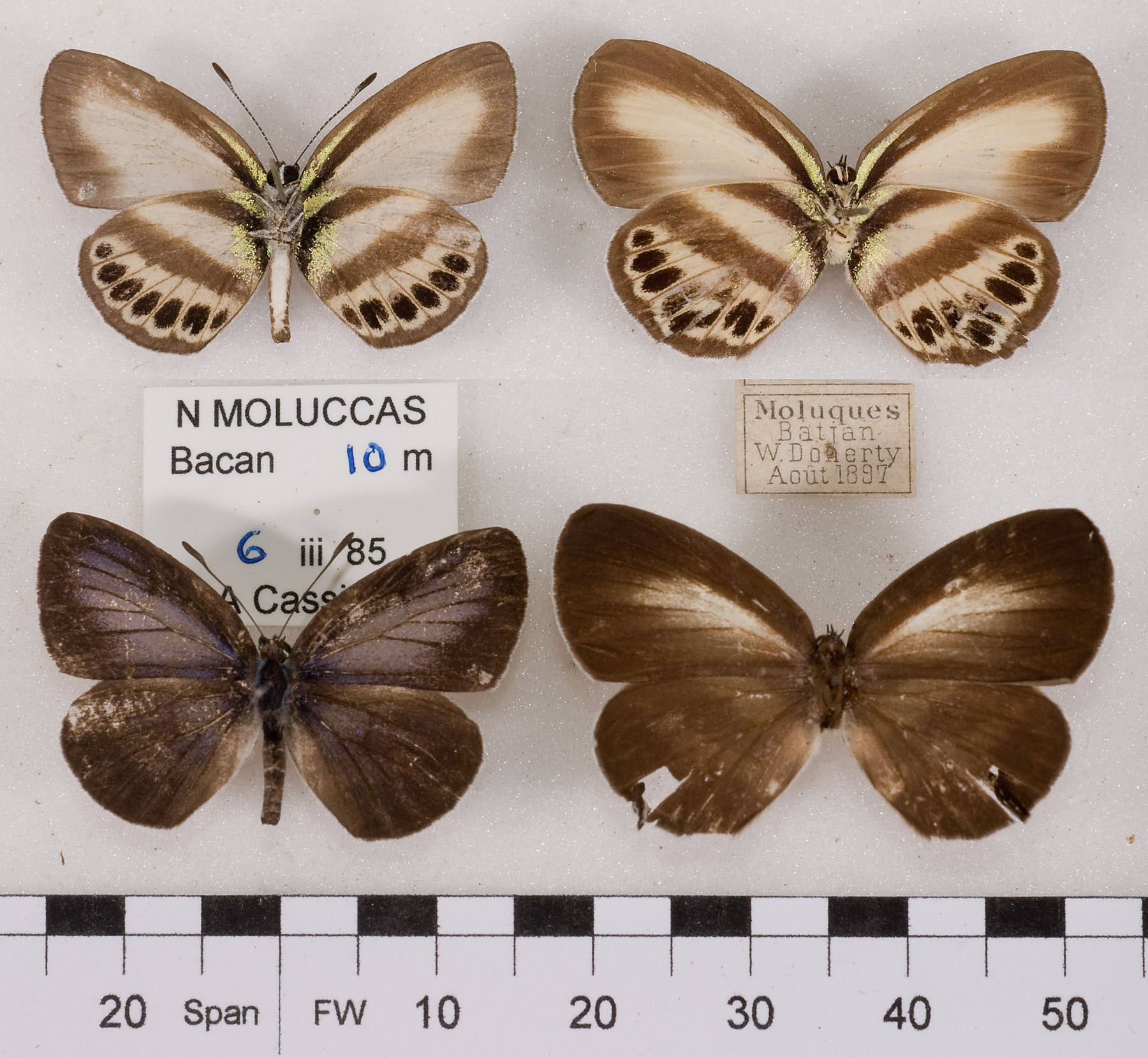
- Nothodanis schaeffera

Scientific classification
- Domain: Eukaryota
- Kingdom: Animalia
- Phylum: Arthropoda
- Class: Insecta
- Order: Lepidoptera
- Family: Lycaenidae
- Subfamily: Polyommatinae
- Tribe: Polyommatini
- Genus: Nothodanis; Hirowatari, 1992

= Nothodanis =

Butterfly genus in family Lycaenidae

Nothodanis is a genus of butterflies in the family Lycaenidae. The single species of this genus, Nothodanis schaeffera (Eschscholtz, 1821) is found in the Australasian and Indomalayan realms. Subspecies

- Nothodanis schaeffera schaeffera (Eschscholtz, 1821) Philippines and Indonesia.
- Nothodanis schaeffera annamensis (Fruhstorfer, 1903) Vietnam.
- Nothodanis schaeffera caesius (Grose-Smith) New Guinea
- Nothodanis schaeffera caledonica (C. & R. Felder, [1865]) New Caledonia
- Nothodanis schaeffera cepheis (Druce, 1891) Solomon Islands
- Nothodanis schaeffera esme (Grose-Smith, 1894) Bismark archipelago, New Britain and New Ireland
- Nothodanis schaeffera soranus (Fruhstorfer, 1915) Halmaheira, Batjan, Ternate
