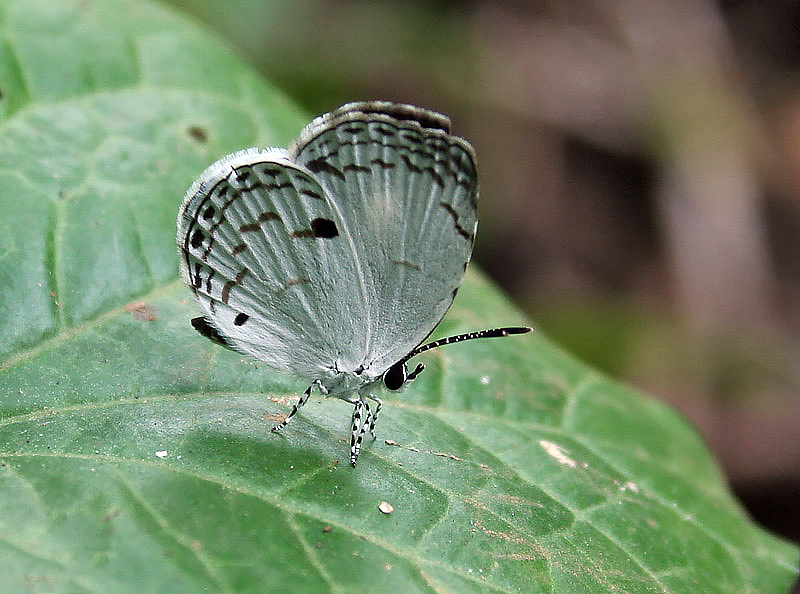
- Quaker (Neopithecops zalmora)

Scientific classification
- Kingdom: Animalia
- Phylum: Arthropoda
- Class: Insecta
- Order: Lepidoptera
- Family: Lycaenidae
- Subfamily: Polyommatinae
- Tribe: Polyommatini
- Genus: Neopithecops; Distant, [1884]

= Neopithecops =

Butterfly genus in family Lycaenidae

Neopithecops is a genus of butterflies in the family Lycaenidae.

== Species ==
- Neopithecops iolanthe Eliot & Kawazoé, 1983 Torres Strait Islands, Cape York, Trobriand Islands, Batjan
- Neopithecops sumbanus Eliot & Kawazoé, 1983 Indonesia Sumba, Tanahjampea, Dammer Island
- Neopithecops umbretta Grose-Smith, 1895 Indonesia Lesser Sunda Islands, Tanahjampea, Sula Islands, Maluku Islands, Obi Island
- Neopithecops zalmora (Butler, 1870)
- Neopithecops sp. – undescribed
