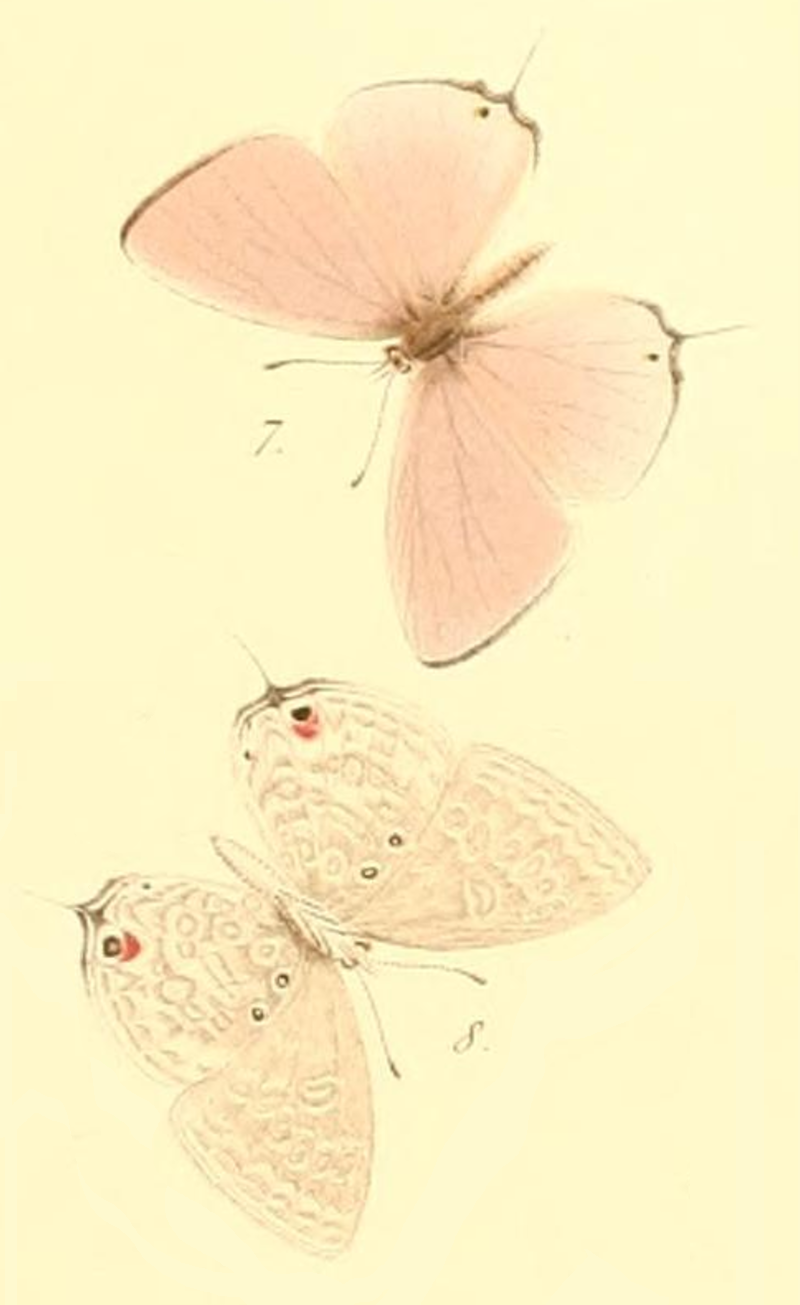
- Male upperside (7) and underside (8)

Scientific classification
- Kingdom: Animalia
- Phylum: Arthropoda
- Clade: Pancrustacea
- Class: Insecta
- Order: Lepidoptera
- Family: Lycaenidae
- Subfamily: Polyommatinae
- Tribe: Polyommatini
- Genus: Rysops; Eliot, 1973
- Species: R. scintilla'

Binomial name
- Rysops scintilla' (Mabille, 1877)

Synonyms
- Lycaena scintilla Mabille, 1877; Catochrysops (Rysops) scintilla; Lycaena quadriocularis Saalmüller, 1884

= Rysops =

Genus of butterflies

Rysops scintilla is a butterfly in the family Lycaenidae. It is the sole representative of the monotypic genus Rysops. It is found on Madagascar, and its habitat consists of forests.
