= Nabokovia =

Scientific classification
- Domain: Eukaryota
- Kingdom: Animalia
- Phylum: Arthropoda
- Class: Insecta
- Order: Lepidoptera
- Family: Lycaenidae
- Subfamily: Polyommatinae
- Tribe: Polyommatini
- Genus: Nabokovia; Hemming, 1960

Synonyms
- Pseudothecla Nabokov, 1945 (non Strand, 1910: preoccupied)

Butterfly genus in family Lycaenidae

Nabokovia is a Neotropical genus of butterflies, named by Arthur Francis Hemming in honour of Vladimir Nabokov, who extensively studied the Polyommatinae subfamily.

Three species are recognized:

- Nabokovia ada Bálint & Johnson, 1994
- Nabokovia cuzquenha Bálint & Lamas, [1997]
- Nabokovia faga (Dognin 1895)
