= Grumiana =

Scientific classification
- Domain: Eukaryota
- Kingdom: Animalia
- Phylum: Arthropoda
- Class: Insecta
- Order: Lepidoptera
- Family: Lycaenidae
- Subfamily: Polyommatinae
- Tribe: Polyommatini
- Genus: Grumiana; Zhdanko, 2004
- Species: G. berezowskii

Binomial name
- Grumiana berezowskii (Grum-Grshimailo, 1902)

Monotypic butterfly genus in family Lycaenidae

Grumiana is a genus of butterflies in the family Lycaenidae erected by Alexander Borisovich Zhdanko in 2004. It is monotypic, containing only the species Grumiana berezowskii first described by Grigory Grum-Grshimailo in 1902. It is found in Sichuan, China.
