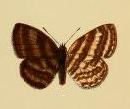

Scientific classification
- Kingdom: Animalia
- Phylum: Arthropoda
- Class: Insecta
- Order: Lepidoptera
- Family: Lycaenidae
- Subfamily: Polyommatinae
- Tribe: Polyommatini
- Genus: Upolampes; Bethune-Baker, 1908
- Species: U. evena

Binomial name
- Upolampes evena (Hewitson, 1876)

Synonyms
- Lycaena evena Hewitson, 1876; Upolampes striata Bethune-Baker, 1908

= Upolampes =

Monotypic butterfly genus in family Lycaenidae

Upolampes is a monotypic genus of butterfly in the family Lycaenidae. Its single species, Upolampes evena, is found in New Guinea.
