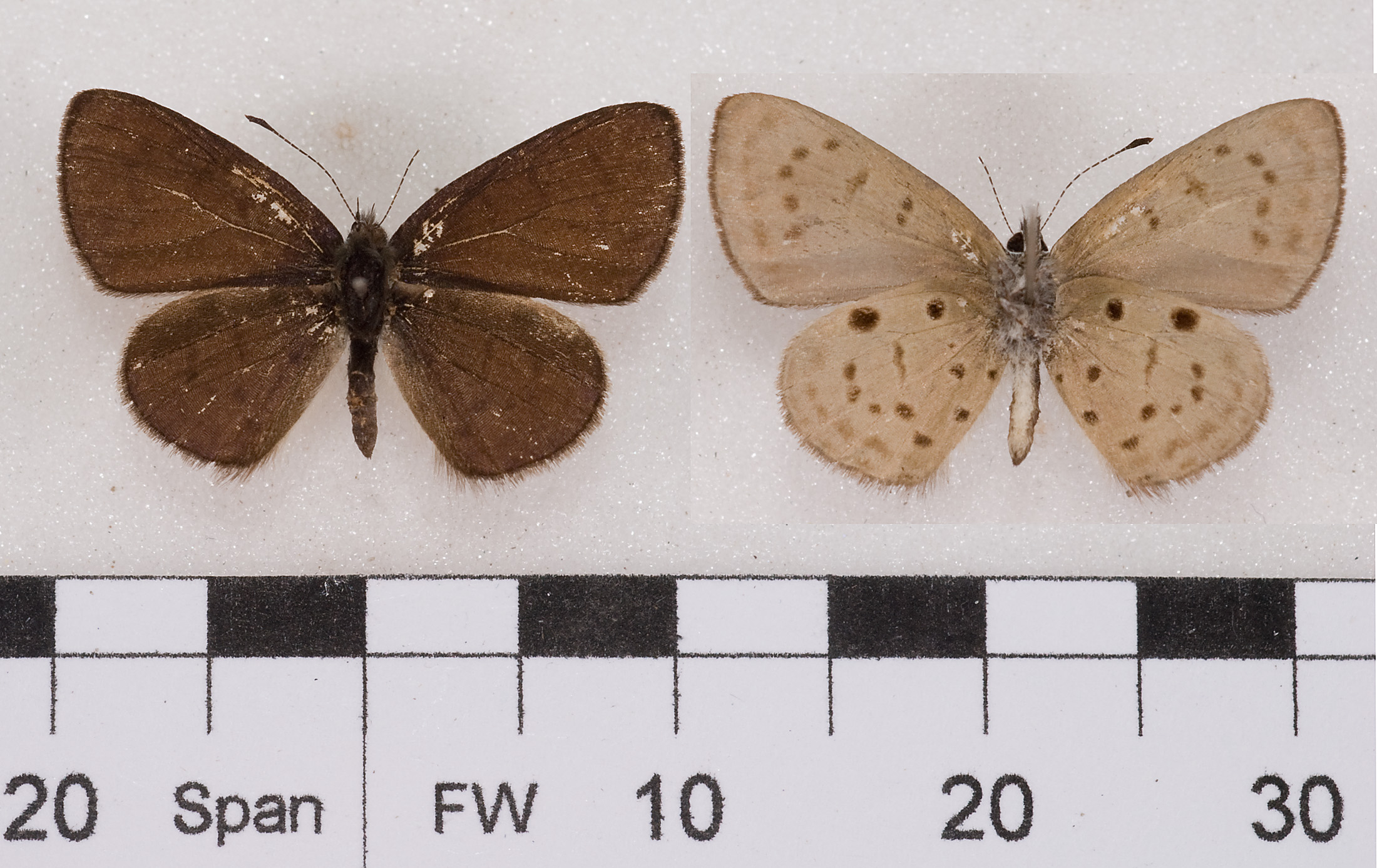
- Una usta

Scientific classification
- Domain: Eukaryota
- Kingdom: Animalia
- Phylum: Arthropoda
- Class: Insecta
- Order: Lepidoptera
- Family: Lycaenidae
- Subfamily: Polyommatinae
- Tribe: Polyommatini
- Genus: Una de Nicéville, 1890

= Una (butterfly) =

Butterfly genus in family Lycaenidae

Una is a genus of butterflies in the family Lycaenidae found in southeast Asia. It contains at least the species Una usta (Distant, 1886), and possibly a second species called Una philippensis Schröder & Treadaway, 1986, which is endemic to the Philippines and viewed by some authors as a subspecies of U. usta.
