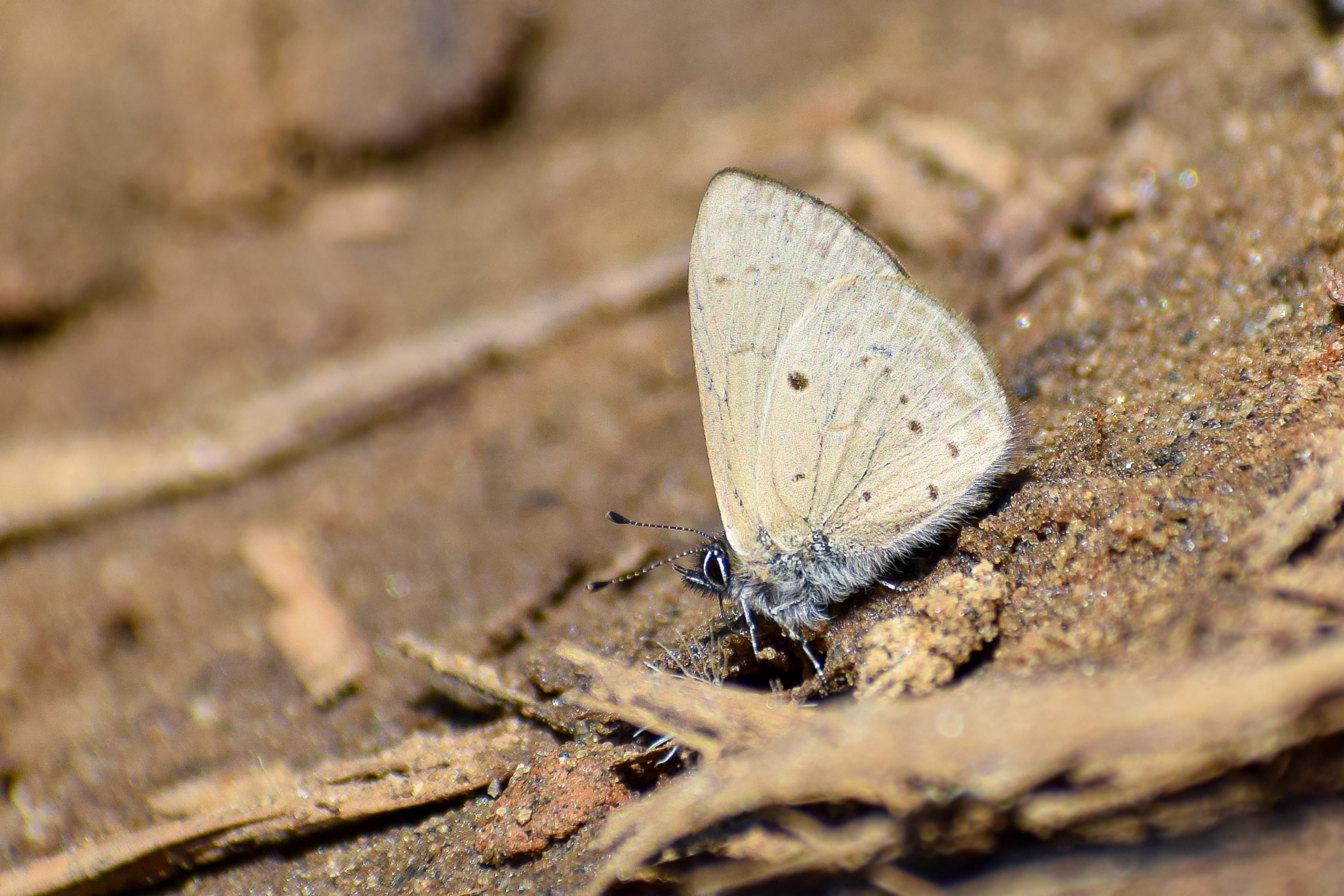
- From Borneo

Scientific classification
- Domain: Eukaryota
- Kingdom: Animalia
- Phylum: Arthropoda
- Class: Insecta
- Order: Lepidoptera
- Family: Lycaenidae
- Genus: Una
- Species: U. usta

Binomial name
- Una usta (Distant, 1886)

= Una usta =

Species of butterfly

Una usta, the una, is a small butterfly found in India and South-East Asia that belongs to the lycaenids or blues family.

== See also ==
- List of butterflies of India (Lycaenidae)
