= Radissima =

Scientific classification
- Domain: Eukaryota
- Kingdom: Animalia
- Phylum: Arthropoda
- Class: Insecta
- Order: Lepidoptera
- Family: Lycaenidae
- Genus: Radissima

Butterfly genus in family Lycaenidae

Radissima is a genus of butterflies in the family Lycaenidae.
