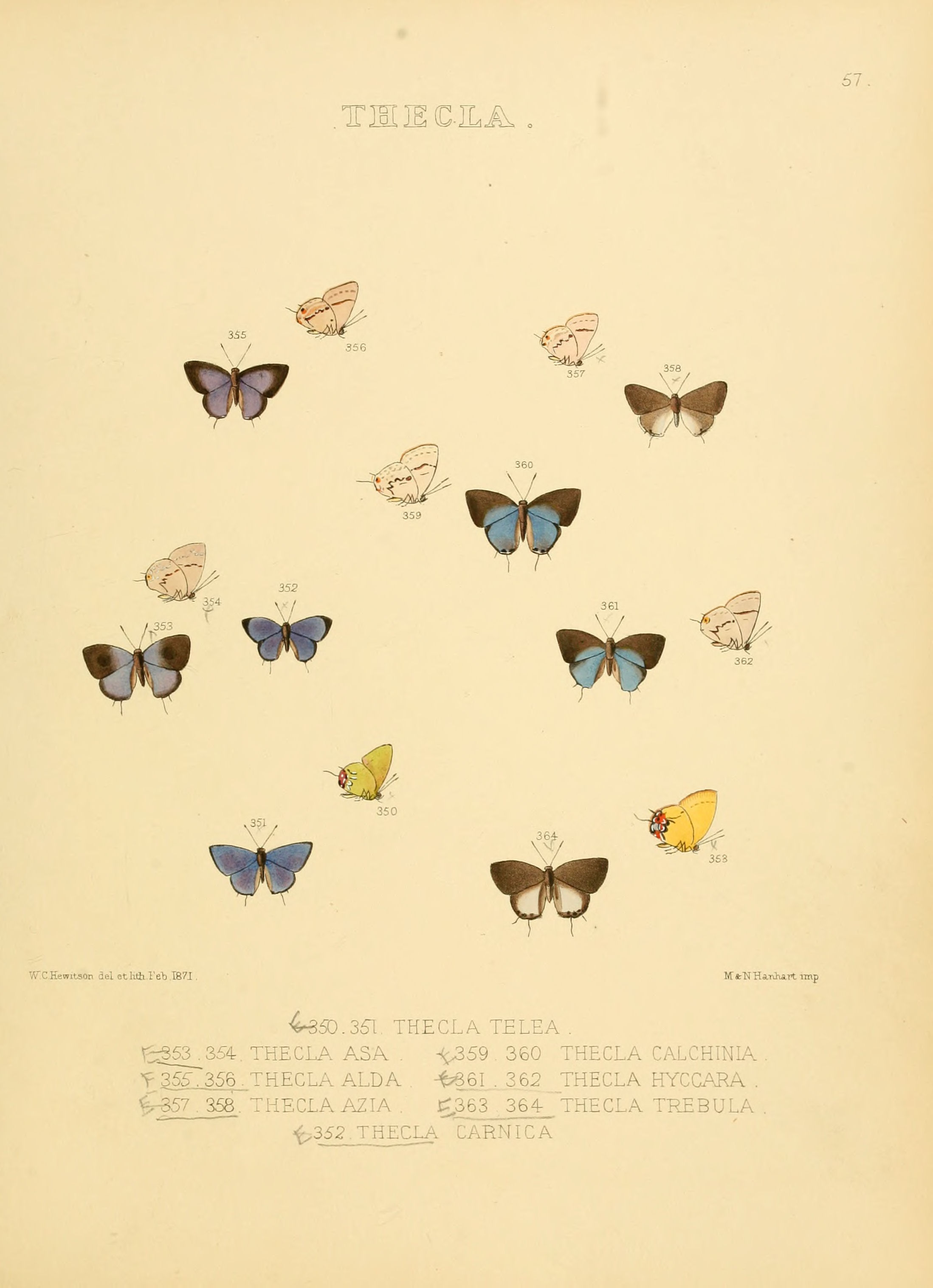
- Nesiostrymon calchinia, figures 359 and 360; Nesiostrymon hyccara, 361 and 362

Scientific classification
- Kingdom: Animalia
- Phylum: Arthropoda
- Clade: Pancrustacea
- Class: Insecta
- Order: Lepidoptera
- Family: Lycaenidae
- Tribe: Eumaeini
- Genus: Nesiostrymon; Clench, 1964

Synonyms
- Sipaea Johnson, 1991; Terra Johnson, 1991

= Nesiostrymon =

Butterfly genus in family Lycaenidae

Nesiostrymon is a Neotropical genus of butterflies in the family Lycaenidae. It was first described by Harry Kendon Clench in 1964.

== Species ==
- Nesiostrymon calchinia (Hewitson, 1868)
- Nesiostrymon hyccara (Hewitson, 1868)
- Nesiostrymon celida (Lucas, 1857)
- Nesiostrymon shoumatoffi (Comstock & Huntington, 1943)
- Nesiostrymon celona (Hewitson, 1874)
- Nesiostrymon dodava (Hewitson, 1877)
- Nesiostrymon endela (Hewitson, 1874)
- Nesiostrymon tristis (Lathy, 1926)
