= Gaeides =

Scientific classification
- Kingdom: Animalia
- Phylum: Arthropoda
- Class: Insecta
- Order: Lepidoptera
- Family: Lycaenidae
- Genus: Gaeides; Scudder, 1876

Species
- 2 species (see text)

Butterfly genus in family Lycaenidae

Gaeides is a genus of butterflies in the family Lycaenidae. Some sources treat is as a synonym of Lycaena.

== Species ==
There are currently two recognised species:

- Gaeides dione (Scudder, 1868)
- Gaeides gorogon (Boisduval, 1852)

Gaeides dione includes Gaeides dione gibboni (Gunder, 1927) as a subspecies.
