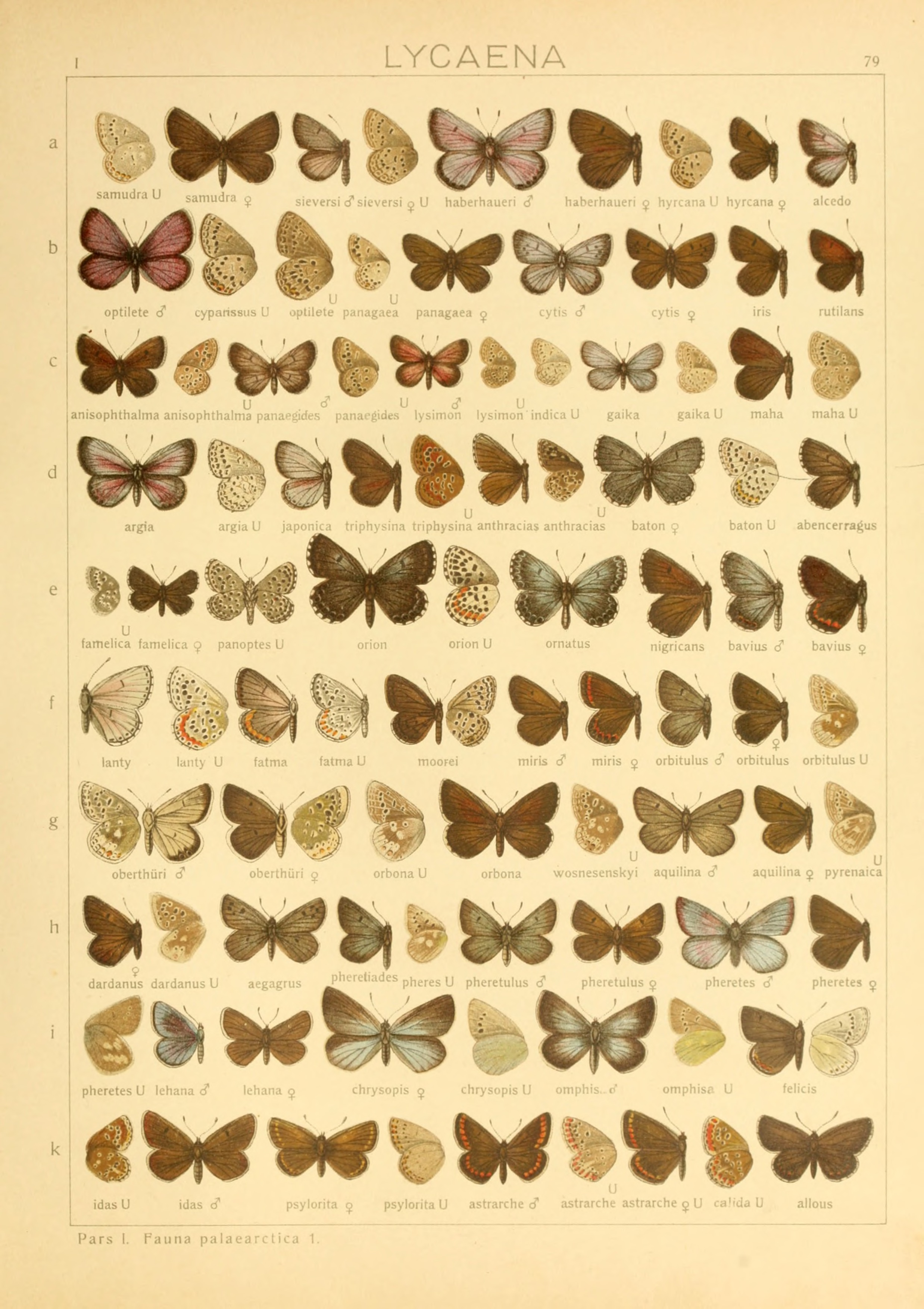
- miris in Seitz (f)

Scientific classification
- Domain: Eukaryota
- Kingdom: Animalia
- Phylum: Arthropoda
- Class: Insecta
- Order: Lepidoptera
- Superfamily: Papilionoidea
- Family: Lycaenidae
- Genus: Rimisia; Zhdanko, 1994
- Species: R. miris

Binomial name
- Rimisia miris ( Staudinger, 1881)

Synonyms
- Lycaena miris Staudinger, 1881; Polyommatus miris (Staudinger, 1881)

= Rimisia miris =

Species of butterfly

Rimisia miris is a species of butterfly in the family Lycaenidae. It is the sole representative of the monotypic genus Rimisia.

According to Hans Fruhstorfer it is found in "Persia, Turkestan and Ferghana, in May and June". L. miris Stgr. (79 f). Above both sexes black-brown, the female with a red submarginal band on both wings, which is only occasionally obsolescent on the forewing, the underside, which otherwise recalls orion, band also very broad and prominent and hence bears a superficial resemblance to astrarche, in which the ocelli, however, are much less regular in position than in miris. In ab. oblitescens Schultz the ocelli of the hindwing beneath have disappeared except for feeble traces.
