= Lambertus Johannes Toxopeus =

Dutch entomologist (1894–1951)

Lambertus Johannes Toxopeus (1894 - April 21, 1951) was a Java-born, Dutch university teacher, entomologist, lepidopterist and botanical collector. In 1921-1922 he participated in the Royal Dutch Geographical and Treub Society expedition to the western Maluku Islands. He gained his doctoral degree in 1930 at the University of Amsterdam and then returned to the island of Java. He mainly worked in Indonesia, then known as the Dutch East Indies, and specialised in the families Lycaenidae and Hesperiidae. In 1934 he collected in Sumatra. In 1938-1939 he participated in the Third Archbold Expedition to Dutch New Guinea. He died in Bandung, Java in 1951.
