= List of lycaenid genera: P =

The large butterfly family Lycaenidae contains the following genera starting with the letter P:

- Paiwarria
- Palaeophilotes
- Pamela
- Pamiria
- Panthiades
- Parachrysops
- Paradeudorix
- Paraduba
- Paralucia
- Paralycaeides
- Parapithecops
- Parelodina
- Parrhasius
- Paruparo
- Patricius
- Penaincisalia
- Pentila
- Perpheres
- Petrelaea
- Phaeostrymon
- Phasis
- Phengaris
- Philiolaus
- Philiris
- Philotes
- Philotiella
- Phlyaria
- Phoenicurusia
- Phothecla
- Phytala
- Pilodeudorix
- Pistoria
- Pithecops
- Plautella
- Plebejidea
- Plebejus
- Plebulina
- Plesiocyanophrys
- Podanotum
- Polyniphes
- Polyommatus
- Polytheclus
- Poriskina
- Poritia
- Porthecla
- Powellana
- Praephilotes
- Pratapa
- Prosotas
- Protantigius
- Protialmenus
- Pseudaletis
- Pseudalmenus
- Pseuderesia
- Pseudiolaus
- Pseudochliaria
- Pseudochrysops
- Pseudodipsas
- Pseudolucia
- Pseudolycaena
- Pseudomyrina
- Pseudonacaduba
- Pseudoneaveia
- Pseudophilotes
- Pseudotajuria
- Pseudozizeeria
- Psychonotis
- Ptelina
- Ptox
- Purlisa
