= Pamiria wojtusiaki =

Scientific classification
- Kingdom: Animalia
- Phylum: Arthropoda
- Clade: Pancrustacea
- Class: Insecta
- Order: Lepidoptera
- Family: Lycaenidae
- Genus: Pamiria
- Species: P. wojtusiaki

Binomial name
- Pamiria wojtusiaki Bálint, 2022

Synonyms
- Lycaena chrysopis; Albulina omphisa chrysopis

Species of butterfly

Pamiria wojtusiaki, the Garhwal green underwing, is a butterfly in the family Lycaenidae. It is found in Garhwal in Uttarakhand. It was described by Zsolt Bálint in 2022.
