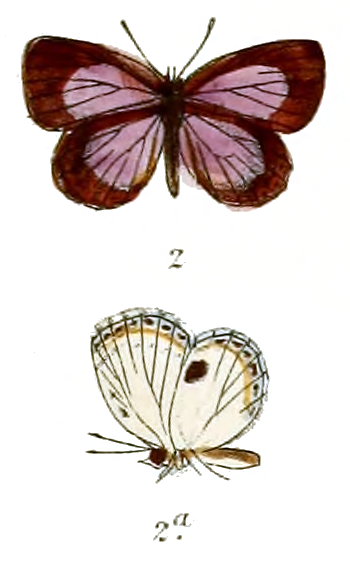

Scientific classification
- Domain: Eukaryota
- Kingdom: Animalia
- Phylum: Arthropoda
- Class: Insecta
- Order: Lepidoptera
- Family: Lycaenidae
- Genus: Pithecops
- Species: P. fulgens

Binomial name
- Pithecops fulgens Doherty 1889

= Pithecops fulgens =

Blue Quaker

Species of butterfly

Pithecops fulgens, the blue Quaker, is a small butterfly found in India (Assam), Japan, Vietnam, and China that belongs to the lycaenids or blues family.

== Description ==
Male upperside dark brown; medial two-thirds from base to disc of both forewings and hindwings glossed with brilliant shining blue. Underside: very similar to the underside of Pithecops hylax, but on both forewings and hindwings the transverse outer postdiscal line is ochraceous rather than pale brown; on the hindwing the inner postdiscal series of transverse spots is wanting and the large round subcostal black spot placed further towards the apex of the wing. Antennae, head, thorax and abdomen much as in P. hylax.

Female upperside: blackish brown without any suffusion of blue. Underside: similar to that of the male. Cilia of forewing pale, of hindwing white.
