= Paradeudorix michelae =

Scientific classification
- Domain: Eukaryota
- Kingdom: Animalia
- Phylum: Arthropoda
- Class: Insecta
- Order: Lepidoptera
- Family: Lycaenidae
- Genus: Paradeudorix
- Species: P. michelae

Binomial name
- Paradeudorix michelae Libert, 2004

Species of butterfly

Paradeudorix michelae is a butterfly in the family Lycaenidae. It is found in Africa.
