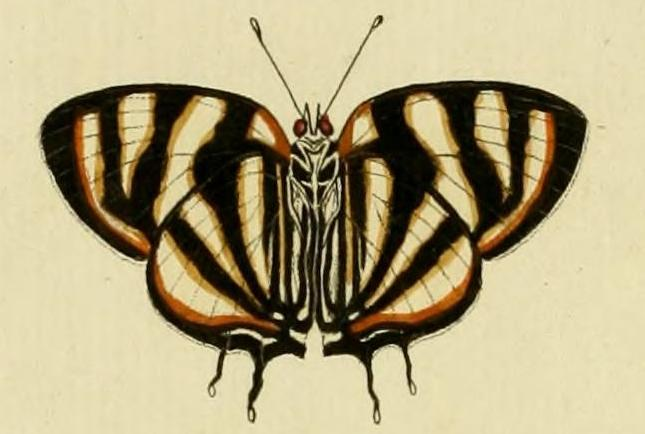

Scientific classification
- Kingdom: Animalia
- Phylum: Arthropoda
- Class: Insecta
- Order: Lepidoptera
- Family: Lycaenidae
- Genus: Panthiades
- Species: P. phaleros

Binomial name
- Panthiades phaleros (Linnaeus, 1767)

Synonyms
- Papilio phaleros Linnaeus, 1767; Papilio silenus Cramer, 1780 (Preocc. Fabricius, 1775); Papilio agis Drury, 1782; Hesperia chiton Fabricius, 1793; Papilio silenissa Herbst, 1800 (replacement name)

= Panthiades phaleros =

Species of butterfly

Panthiades phaleros, the Phaleros hairstreak, is a butterfly in the family Lycaenidae. It is found from Mexico to Brazil.
