= Panthiades paphlagon =

Scientific classification
- Domain: Eukaryota
- Kingdom: Animalia
- Phylum: Arthropoda
- Class: Insecta
- Order: Lepidoptera
- Family: Lycaenidae
- Genus: Panthiades
- Species: P. paphlagon

Binomial name
- Panthiades paphlagon (C. & R. Felder, 1865)

Synonyms
- Pseudolycaena paphlagon C. & R. Felder, 1865; Thecla paphlagon

Species of butterfly

Panthiades paphlagon is a butterfly in the family Lycaenidae. It was described by Cajetan Felder and Rudolf Felder in 1865. It is found in Colombia, Peru and Venezuela.
