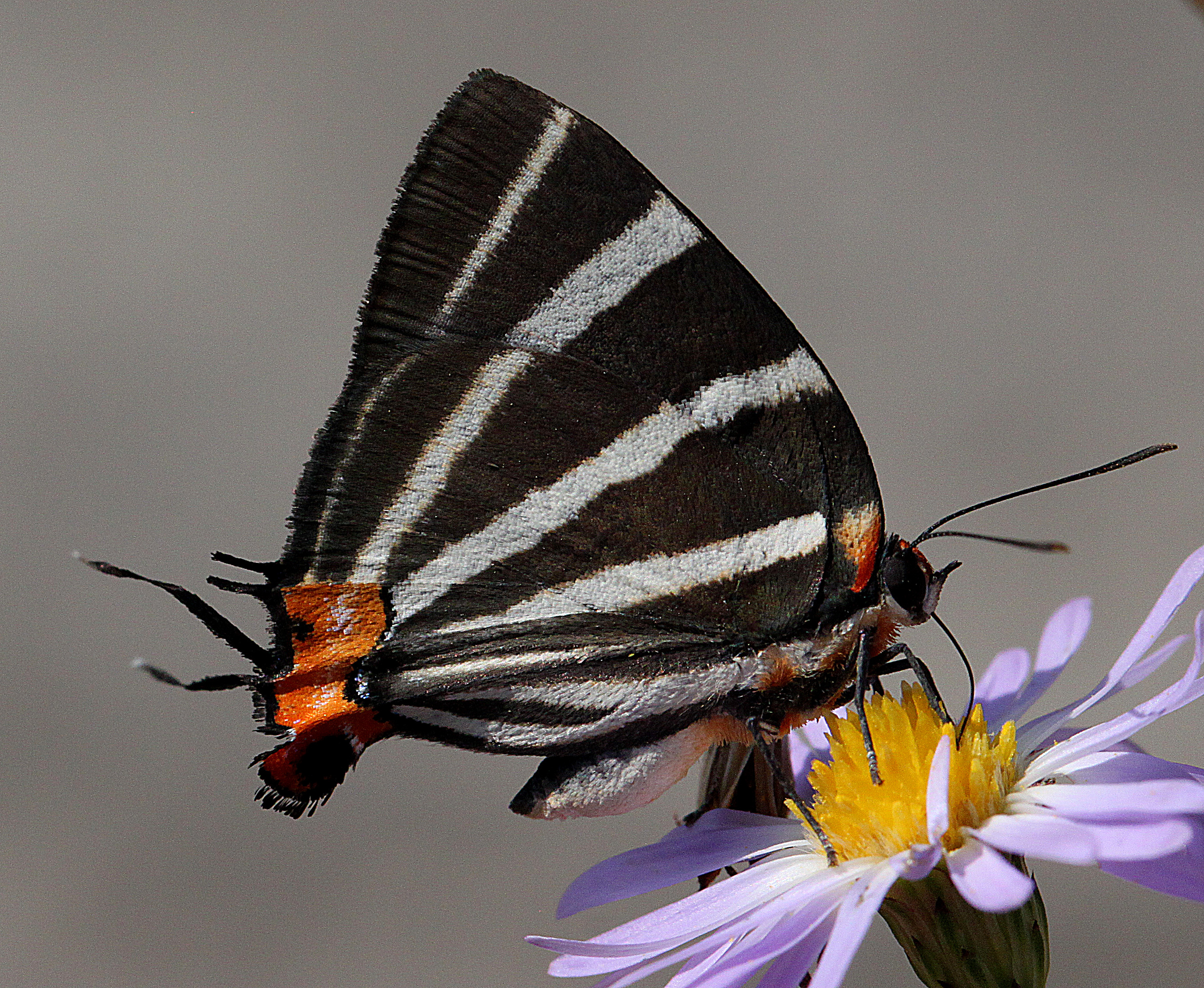
- Male, Texas
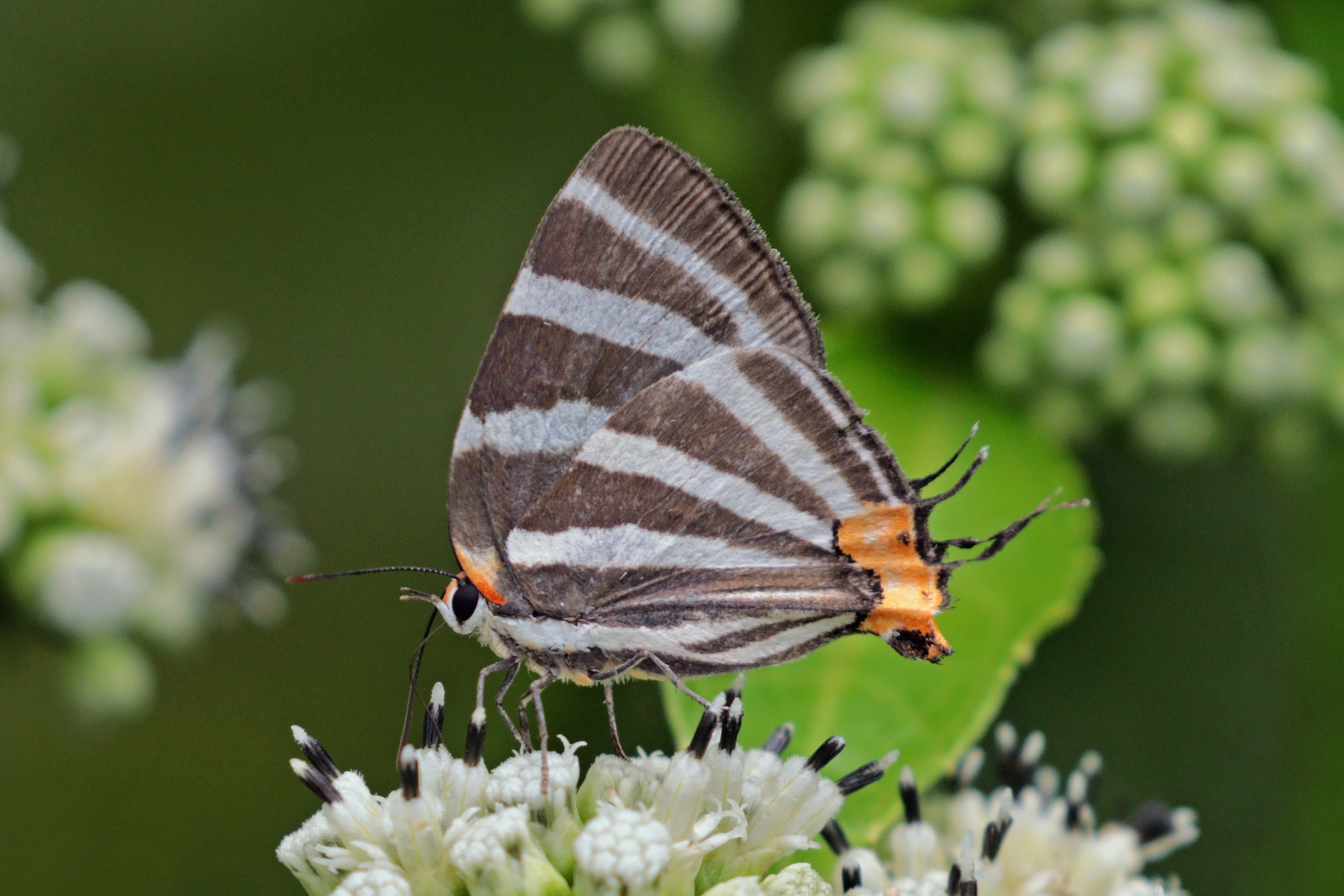
- Female, Panama

Scientific classification
- Domain: Eukaryota
- Kingdom: Animalia
- Phylum: Arthropoda
- Class: Insecta
- Order: Lepidoptera
- Family: Lycaenidae
- Genus: Panthiades
- Species: P. bathildis

Binomial name
- Panthiades bathildis (C. & R. Felder, 1865)

Synonyms
- Pseudolycaena bathildis C. Felder & R. Felder, 1865; Papilio battus Cramer, 1775 (Preocc. Denis & Schiffermüller, 1775); Thecla jalan Reakirt, [1867]; Thecla aufidena Hewitson, 1869

= Panthiades bathildis =

Species of butterfly

Panthiades bathildis is a butterfly in the family Lycaenidae. It was described by Cajetan and Rudolf Felder in 1865. It is found from Mexico, Central America and Panama to Colombia, Venezuela and Suriname. There have also been sightings in Texas.
