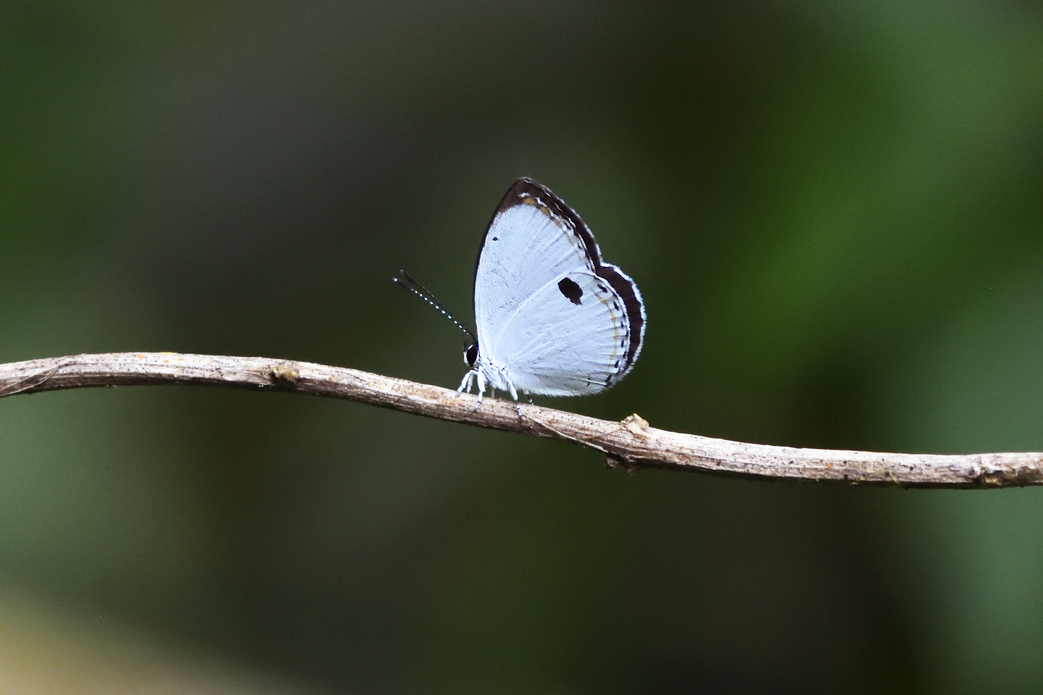

Scientific classification
- Kingdom: Animalia
- Phylum: Arthropoda
- Class: Insecta
- Order: Lepidoptera
- Family: Lycaenidae
- Genus: Pithecops
- Species: P. mariae

Binomial name
- Pithecops mariae de Nicéville, 1894

Synonyms
- Petrelaea mariae De Nicéville, 1894; Pithecops fulgens mariae De Nicéville, 1894

= Pithecops mariae =

Species of butterfly

Pithecops mariae is a small butterfly found in Sumatra that belongs to the lycaenids or blues family. It was first described by British Entomologist Lionel de Nicéville in 1894.
