= Paradeudorix cobaltina =

Scientific classification
- Domain: Eukaryota
- Kingdom: Animalia
- Phylum: Arthropoda
- Class: Insecta
- Order: Lepidoptera
- Family: Lycaenidae
- Genus: Paradeudorix
- Species: P. cobaltina

Binomial name
- Paradeudorix cobaltina (Stempffer, 1964)

Synonyms
- Deudorix (Hypokopelates) cobaltina Stempffer, 1964

Species of butterfly

Paradeudorix cobaltina, the cobalt fairy playboy, is a butterfly in the family Lycaenidae. It is found in Nigeria (the eastern part of the country and the Cross River loop), Cameroon, Equatorial Guinea, Gabon, the Republic of the Congo, the Central African Republic, Angola, the Democratic Republic of the Congo (Uele) and western Uganda. The habitat consists of primary forests.
