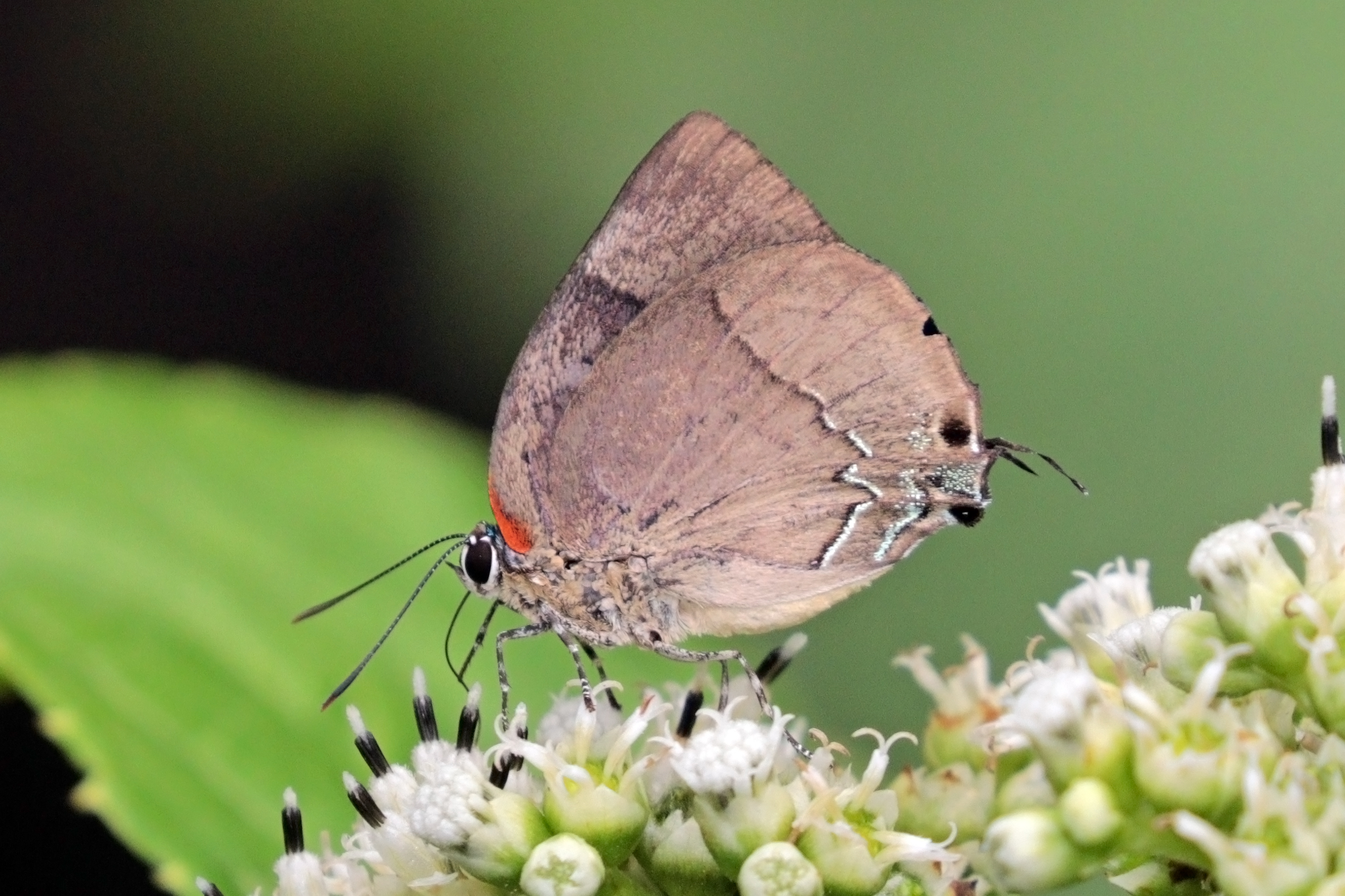
- P. b. bitias male, Anton Valley, Panama
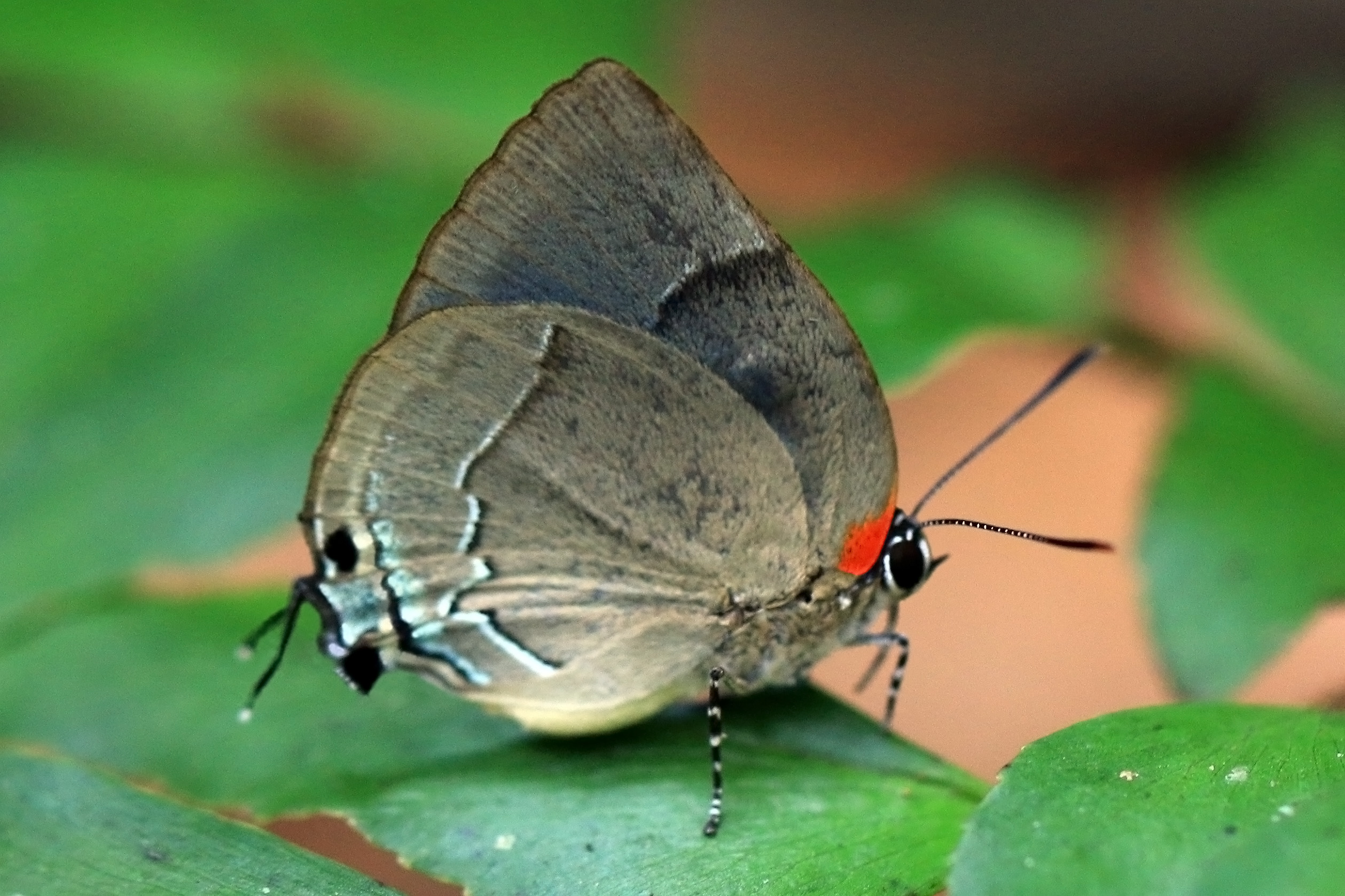
- P. b. bitias female, Cristalino River, Southern Amazon, Brazil

Scientific classification
- Domain: Eukaryota
- Kingdom: Animalia
- Phylum: Arthropoda
- Class: Insecta
- Order: Lepidoptera
- Family: Lycaenidae
- Genus: Panthiades
- Species: P. bitias

Binomial name
- Panthiades bitias (Cramer, [1777])

Synonyms
- Papilio bitias Cramer, 1777; Papilio syncellus Stoll, 1780; Thecla eribaea Hewitson, 1867; Thecla syncellus sierrae Dyar, 1916; Thecla deserta Draudt, 1918

= Panthiades bitias =

Species of butterfly

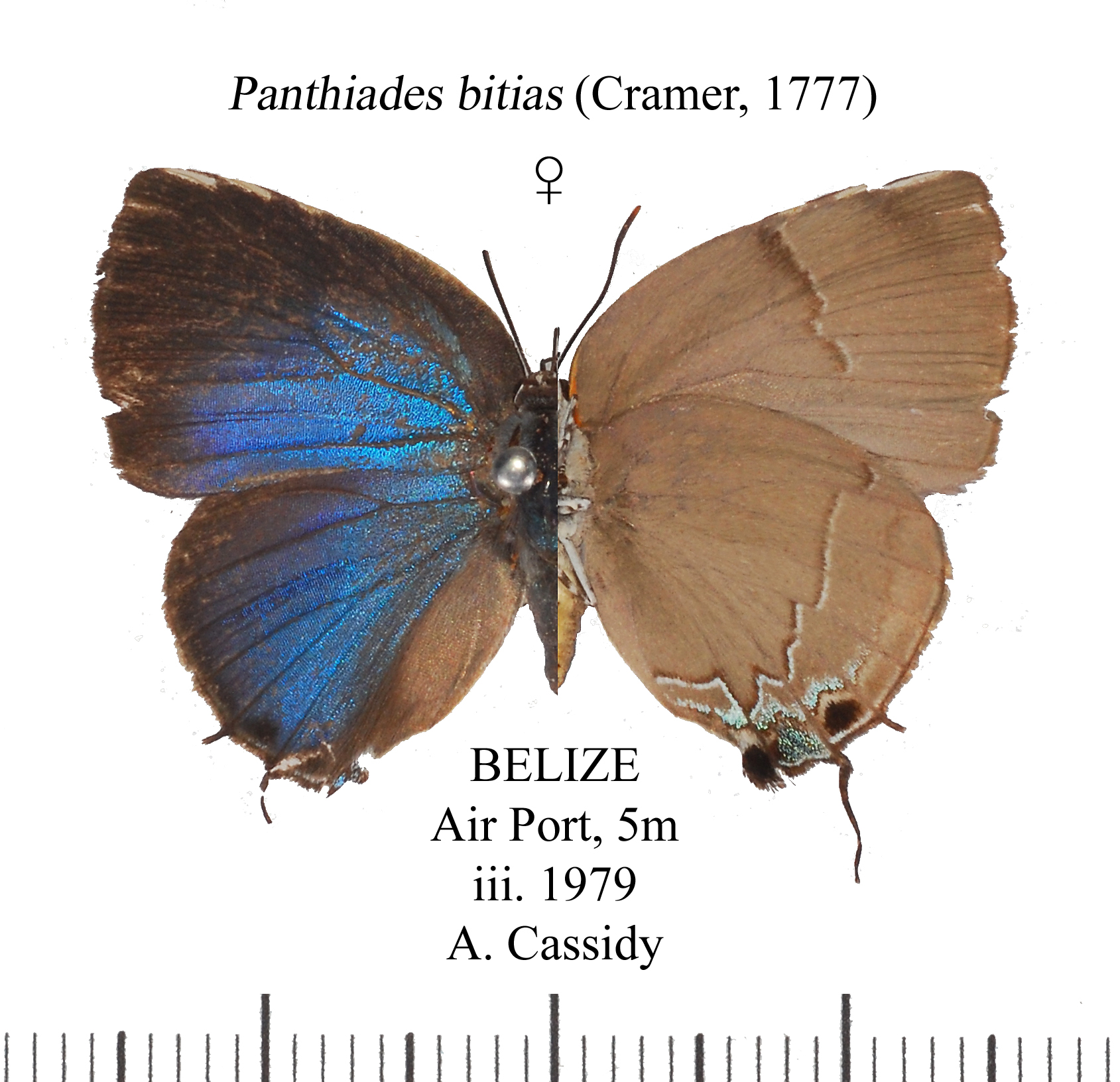

Panthiades bitias is a butterfly in the family Lycaenidae. It was described by Pieter Cramer in 1777. It is found from Mexico to the Amazon and Suriname.
