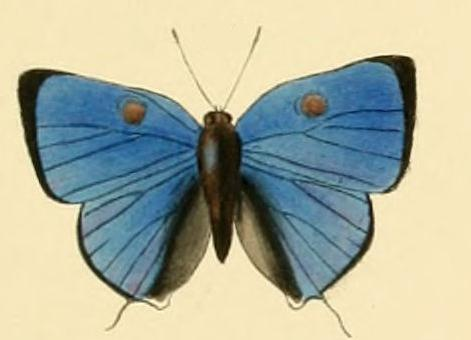

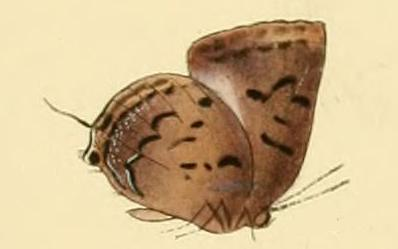

Scientific classification
- Domain: Eukaryota
- Kingdom: Animalia
- Phylum: Arthropoda
- Class: Insecta
- Order: Lepidoptera
- Family: Lycaenidae
- Genus: Panthiades
- Species: P. hebraeus

Binomial name
- Panthiades hebraeus (Hewitson, 1867)

Synonyms
- Thecla hebraeus Hewitson, 1867; Thecla nannidion Burmeister, 1878; Panthiades cimelium Gosse, 1880

= Panthiades hebraeus =

Species of butterfly

Panthiades hebraeus is a butterfly in the family Lycaenidae. It was described by William Chapman Hewitson in 1867. It is found in Brazil, Paraguay and Argentina.
