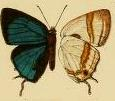

Scientific classification
- Domain: Eukaryota
- Kingdom: Animalia
- Phylum: Arthropoda
- Class: Insecta
- Order: Lepidoptera
- Family: Lycaenidae
- Genus: Paradeudorix
- Species: P. ituri

Binomial name
- Paradeudorix ituri (Bethune-Baker, 1908)

Synonyms
- Deudoryx ituri Bethune-Baker, 1908; Deudorix ultramarina Stempffer, 1964

= Paradeudorix ituri =

Species of butterfly

Paradeudorix ituri, the Ituri fairy playboy, is a butterfly in the family Lycaenidae. It is found in Nigeria, Cameroon, Equatorial Guinea, Gabon, the Republic of the Congo, the Central African Republic, the Democratic Republic of the Congo, Sudan, Uganda, Kenya and Tanzania. The habitat consists of primary forests.

== Subspecies ==
- Paradeudorix ituri ituri (Nigeria: east and the Cross River loop, Cameroon, Bioko, Gabon, Congo, Central African Republic, Democratic Republic of the Congo: Mongala, Uele, Tshopo, Tshuapa, Equateur, Sankuru and Maniema)
- Paradeudorix ituri ugandae (Talbot, 1935) (southern Sudan, western Uganda, western Kenya, north-western Tanzania)
