= Paradeudorix petersi =

Scientific classification
- Kingdom: Animalia
- Phylum: Arthropoda
- Clade: Pancrustacea
- Class: Insecta
- Order: Lepidoptera
- Family: Lycaenidae
- Genus: Paradeudorix
- Species: P. petersi

Binomial name
- Paradeudorix petersi (Stempffer & Bennett, 1956)

Synonyms
- Deudorix (Hypokopelates) petersi Stempffer & Bennett, 1956

Species of butterfly

Paradeudorix petersi, the Peters' fairy playboy, is a butterfly in the family Lycaenidae. It is found in Guinea, Sierra Leone, Liberia, Ivory Coast and Ghana. The habitat consists of primary forests.
