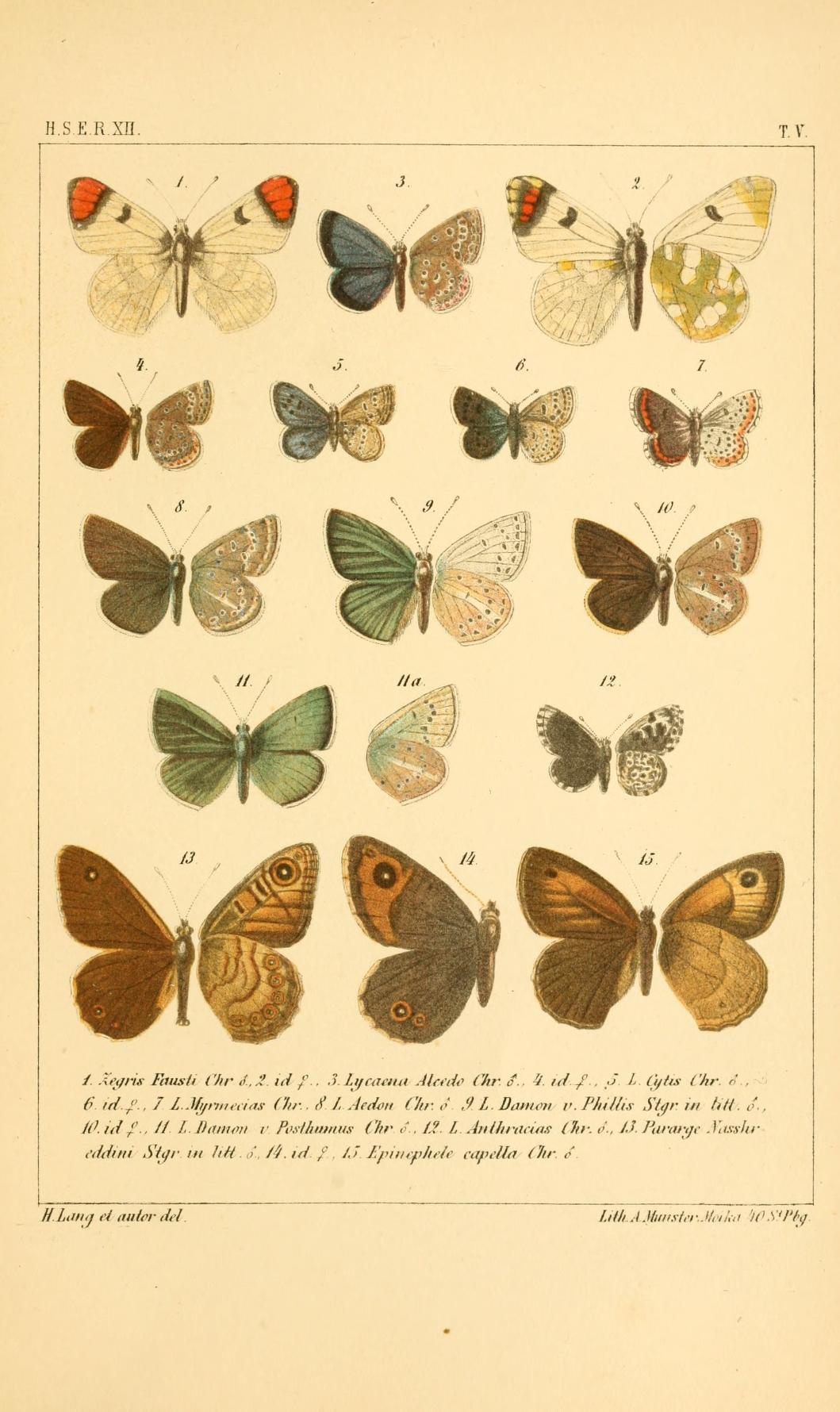
- Praephilotes anthracias figure 12

Scientific classification
- Domain: Eukaryota
- Kingdom: Animalia
- Phylum: Arthropoda
- Class: Insecta
- Order: Lepidoptera
- Family: Lycaenidae
- Genus: Praephilotes
- Species: P. anthracias

Binomial name
- Praephilotes anthracias (Christoph, 1877)

= Praephilotes anthracias =

Species of butterfly

Praephilotes anthracias is a species of butterfly in the family Lycaenidae first described by Hugo Theodor Christoph in 1877. It is known from Kazakhstan (desert tracts of Atyrau Region, southern Altai, near Lake Zaysan, south of the Ili River valley, Baygakum), Uzbekistan (valley of the river Syr Darya), Turkmenistan (Krasnovodsk, Ashgabat, Small Balkhan), Tajikistan (Vakhsh valley, Kafirnigan), western China. The most northern locality is known from Lake Elton neighborhoods. Also known from the south of Russia - Astrakhan region, where the species was first discovered only in 1999. Now there are several populations of sandy massifs Bolhuny and Batpaysagyr. In the western part of the desert Batpaysagyr species occurs in many localities: Dosanga, Aksaraiskaya, Komsomolsk, etc. can be usually in habitats.
