= Paradeudorix moyambina =

Scientific classification
- Domain: Eukaryota
- Kingdom: Animalia
- Phylum: Arthropoda
- Class: Insecta
- Order: Lepidoptera
- Family: Lycaenidae
- Genus: Paradeudorix
- Species: P. moyambina

Binomial name
- Paradeudorix moyambina (Bethune-Baker, 1904)

Synonyms
- Hypolycaena moyambina Bethune-Baker, 1904

Species of butterfly

Paradeudorix moyambina, the black fairy playboy, is a butterfly in the family Lycaenidae. It is found in Sierra Leone, Ivory Coast, Ghana, Togo, Nigeria (south and the Cross River loop), Gabon, the Republic of the Congo and the Democratic Republic of the Congo. The habitat consists of primary forests.
