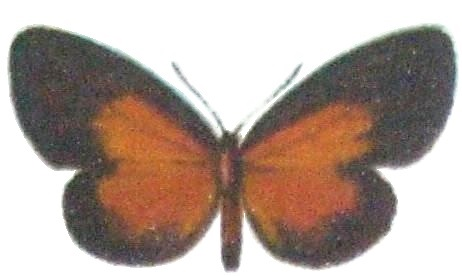

Scientific classification
- Kingdom: Animalia
- Phylum: Arthropoda
- Clade: Pancrustacea
- Class: Insecta
- Order: Lepidoptera
- Family: Lycaenidae
- Genus: Ptelina
- Species: P. carnuta

Binomial name
- Ptelina carnuta (Hewitson, 1873)

Synonyms
- Pentila carnuta Hewitson, 1873; Ptelina cornuta; Liptena parva Kirby, 1887; Telipna kamitugensis Dufrane, 1945

= Ptelina carnuta =

Species of butterfly

Ptelina carnuta, the bordered buff, is a butterfly in the family Lycaenidae. It is found in Guinea, Sierra Leone, Liberia, Ivory Coast, Ghana, Togo, southern Nigeria, Cameroon, Gabon, the Republic of the Congo, the Central African Republic, the Democratic Republic of the Congo (Haut-Uele, Ituri, Tshopo, Equateur, Kinshasa, Sankuru and Lualaba), Uganda and north-western Tanzania. The habitat consists of forests.

Adult males and females feed at extrafloral nectaries of vine tendrils and bamboo and on shoots of plants belonging to the family Marantaceae.

Torben Larsen developed a species numbering system for his 2005 publication Butterflies of West Africa. This species is #141. The 'Larsen' numbers have since been used with permission in A Sharp Eye on Butterflies of Ghana.
