= Ptelina subhyalina =

Scientific classification
- Kingdom: Animalia
- Phylum: Arthropoda
- Class: Insecta
- Order: Lepidoptera
- Family: Lycaenidae
- Genus: Ptelina
- Species: P. subhyalina

Binomial name
- Ptelina subhyalina (Joicey & Talbot, 1921)

Synonyms
- Telipna subhyalina Joicey & Talbot, 1921

Species of butterfly

Ptelina subhyalina is a butterfly in the family Lycaenidae. It is found at Ituri and Équateur in the Democratic Republic of the Congo.
