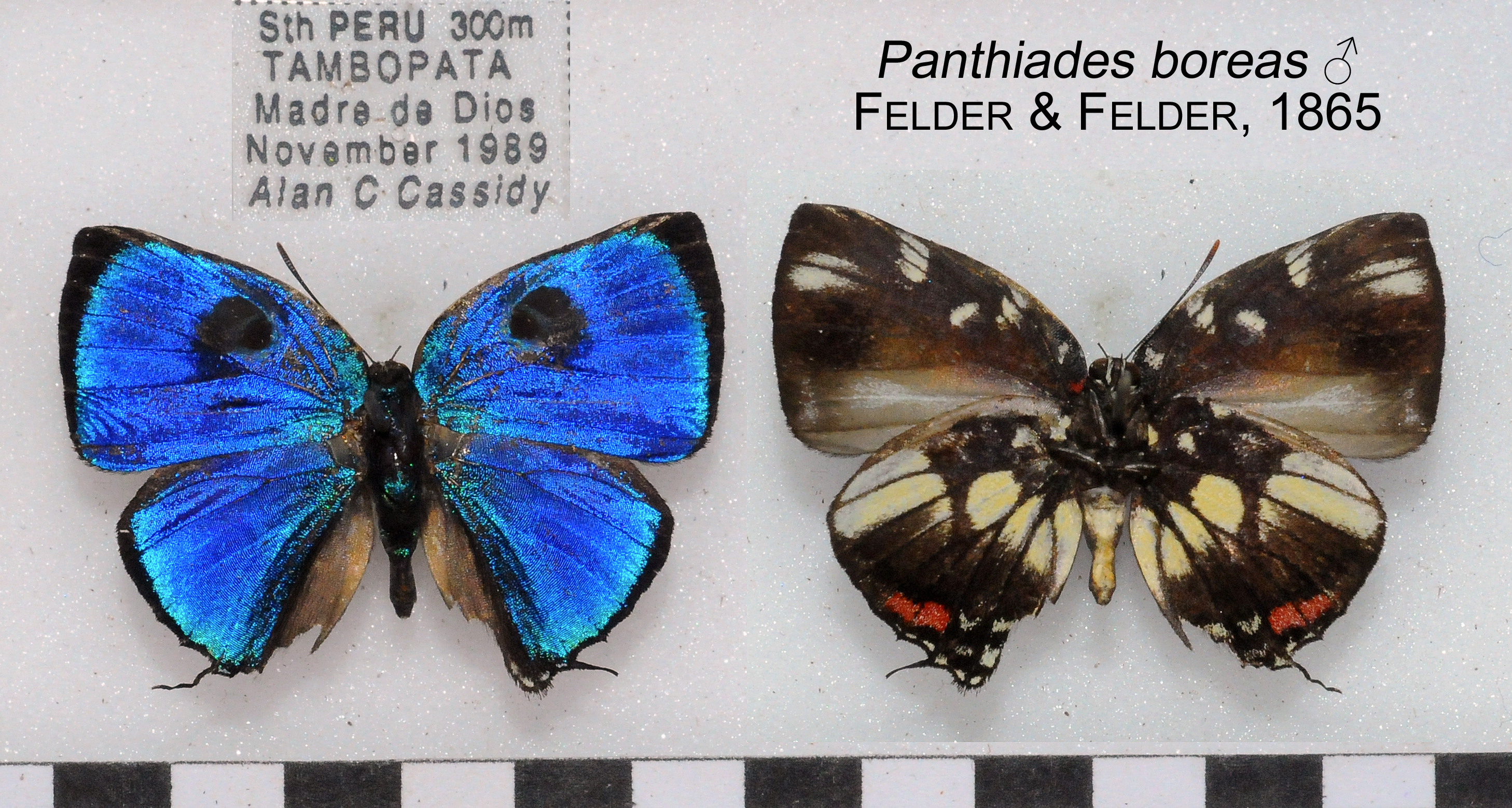
- Panthiades boreas (male (left) (female (right))

Scientific classification
- Domain: Eukaryota
- Kingdom: Animalia
- Phylum: Arthropoda
- Class: Insecta
- Order: Lepidoptera
- Family: Lycaenidae
- Genus: Panthiades
- Species: P. boreas

Binomial name
- Panthiades boreas (C. & R. Felder, 1865)

Synonyms
- Pseudolycaena boreas C. & R. Felder, 1865; Thecla boreas

= Panthiades boreas =

Species of butterfly

Panthiades boreas is a butterfly in the family Lycaenidae. It was described by Cajetan and Rudolf Felder in 1865. It is found in Colombia and the Amazon.
