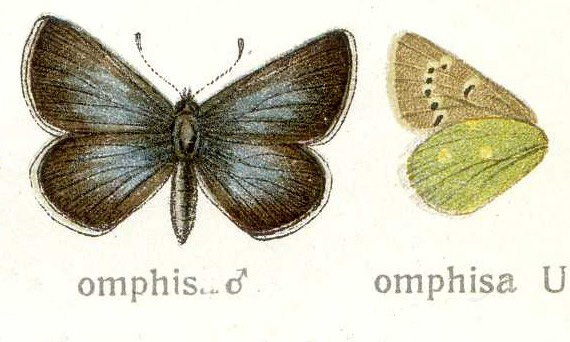
- Male upperside on left, underside right

Scientific classification
- Kingdom: Animalia
- Phylum: Arthropoda
- Class: Insecta
- Order: Lepidoptera
- Family: Lycaenidae
- Genus: Pamiria
- Species: P. omphisa

Binomial name
- Pamiria omphisa (Moore, [1875])

Synonyms
- Polyommatus omphisa Moore, [1875]; Albulina omphisa (Moore, [1875])

= Pamiria omphisa =

Dusky green underwing

Species of butterfly

Pamiria omphisa, the dusky green underwing, is a species of blue (Lycaenidae) butterfly found in Asia.

== Description ==
Male has the uppersides of wings dark brown. Forewings and hindwings are overlaid from base outwards for some distance with purplish blue, clear dark blue or shining metallic green. The extent of this colour very variable; in some specimens, on the forewing it spreads irregularly outwards mainly along the costa and on the hindwing in the middle to the disc; in others, it covers the basal three-fourths of the wings, leaving a well-defined broad terminal margin of the ground colour on the forewing, and on the hindwing, broad costal, terminal and dorsal margins; cilia conspicuously white.

Underside of forewing is a clear, slightly brownish grey, paler along the costal and terminal margins; a transverse, slightly lunular discocellular spot and a transverse series of six small discal spots black, all with slender white edgings, the discal series placed in a slight curve, the posterior three spots en echelon; no terminal markings except an anteciliary dark line. Hindwing metallic green; in many specimens faint traces of one or two subbasal spots, entirely absent in others; a discocellular spot and a curved, transverse, discal series of from three to five spots, white; terminal markings, with the exception of a slender anteciliary dark line, absent, as on the forewing.

Antennae, head, thorax and abdomen brownish black, the shafts of the antennae ringed with white, the head, thorax and abdomen with some bluish pubescence; beneath: the palpi, thorax and abdomen white, the palpi fringed anteriorly with stiff black hairs.

Female has the upperside uniform brown. Forewings and hindwings with slender, black, anteciliary lines and conspicuous snow-white cilia. Many specimens have some slight irroration (sprinkling) of blue scales at the bases of the wings. Underside similar to that of the male, the black spots on the forewing and the white spots on the hindwing generally larger, and on the latter wing more clearly defined.

Wingspan of 26–33 mm.

== Range ==
The butterfly occurs in India (Lahul), northern Pakistan, in the Himalayas (Chitral, Ladakh), and north to China.

== Taxonomy ==
Pamiria omphisa was earlier and is still sometimes classified as Polyommatus omphisa or Albulina omphisa.

== See also ==
- List of butterflies of India (Lycaenidae)
