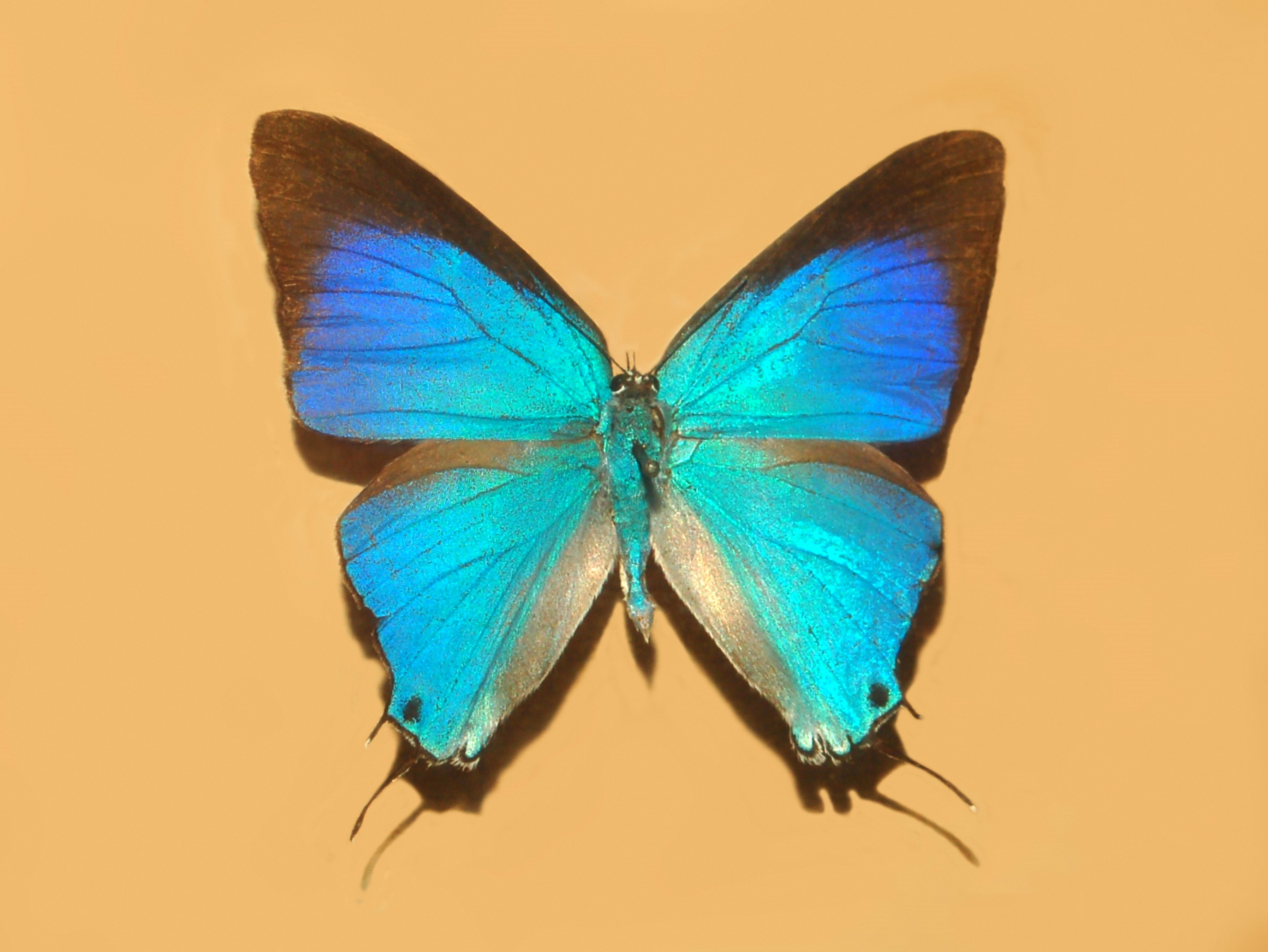
- Specimen of Pseudolycaena marsyas from Guyana

Scientific classification
- Kingdom: Animalia
- Phylum: Arthropoda
- Class: Insecta
- Order: Lepidoptera
- Family: Lycaenidae
- Subfamily: Theclinae
- Tribe: Eumaeini
- Genus: Pseudolycaena
- Species: P. marsyas

Binomial name
- Pseudolycaena marsyas (Linnaeus, 1758)

Synonyms
- Papilio marsyas Linnaeus, 1758; Pseudolycaena marsyas Linnaeus, 1758 by Wallengren, 1863; Thecla cybele Godman & Salvin, 1896; Thecla dorcas Druce, 1907; Pseudolycaena marsyas nellyae Lamas, 1981

= Pseudolycaena marsyas =

Species of butterfly

Pseudolycaena marsyas, the Cambridge blue, giant hairstreak or Marsyas hairstreak, is a species of butterfly in the family Lycaenidae.

== Description ==
Pseudolycaena marsyas has a wingspan of about 40–50 millimetres (1.6–2.0 in), a quite huge size in hairstreaks (hence the common name "giant hairstreak"). The uppersides of the wings are usually metallic blue, with hues varying from cobalt blue to turquoise blue depending on location. The apex of the wings are black and lightly falcade in males and the hindwings are tailed in both sexes, with a small black spot. The undersides of the wings are pale blue greyish, with several black spots and thin markings.

== Distribution ==
This wide-ranging species occurs across South America down to Argentina, in many kinds of habitats but often semi-open forests at an elevation of about 0–1,000 metres (0–3,281 ft) above sea level. Occasional records from the very wet Atlantic coast of Central America.

== Subspecies ==
Many forms varying in the hue of the blue but these are allocated to a single subspecies - Pseudolycaena marsyas marsyas.
