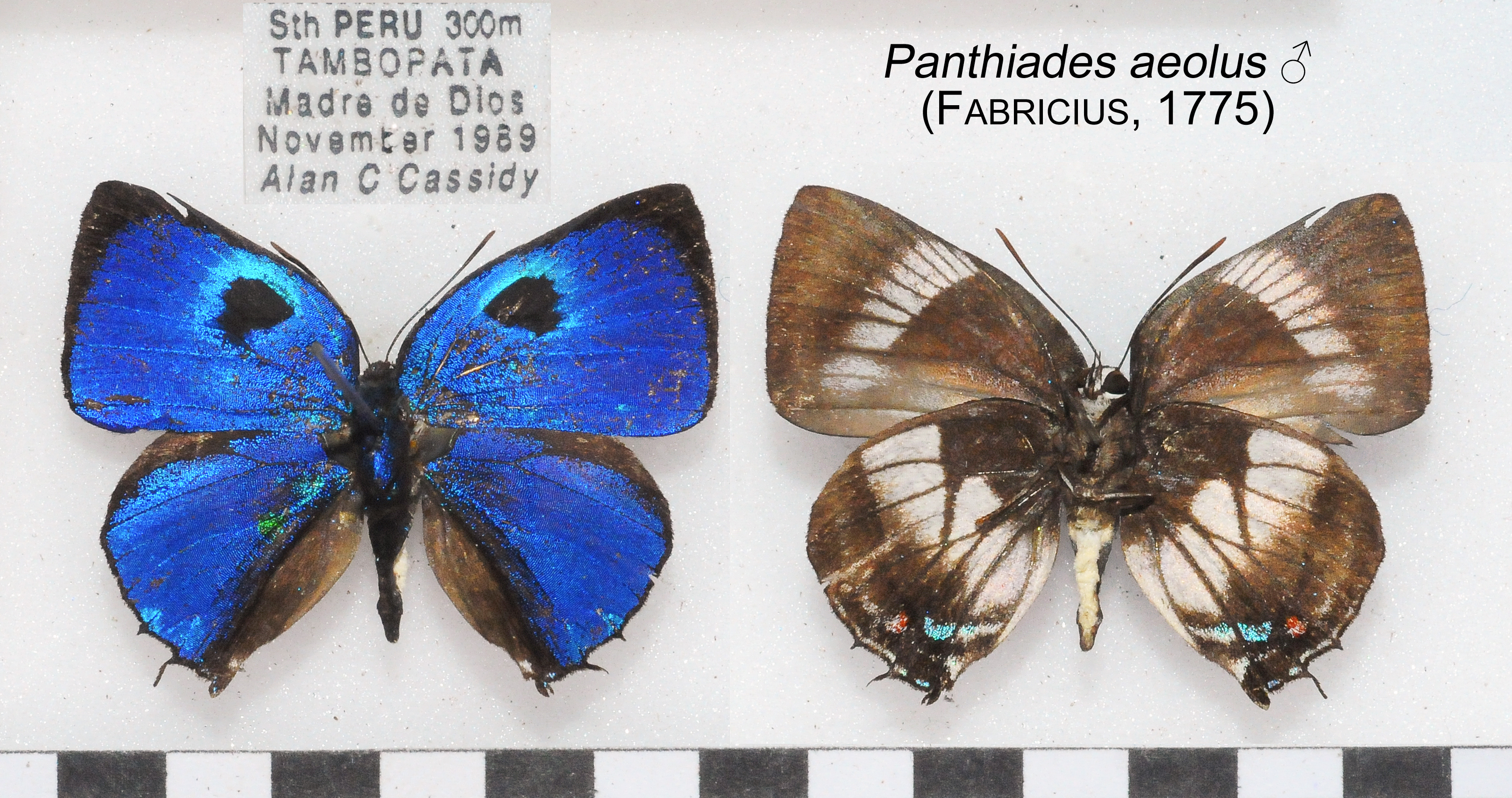

Scientific classification
- Domain: Eukaryota
- Kingdom: Animalia
- Phylum: Arthropoda
- Class: Insecta
- Order: Lepidoptera
- Family: Lycaenidae
- Genus: Panthiades
- Species: P. aeolus

Binomial name
- Panthiades aeolus (Fabricius, 1775)

Synonyms
- Papilio aeolus Fabricius, 1775; Papilio simplex Walch, 1775; Papilio pelion Cramer, 1775; Papilio thallus Cramer, 1779

= Panthiades aeolus =

Species of butterfly

Panthiades aeolus is a butterfly in the family Lycaenidae. It was described by Johan Christian Fabricius in 1775. It is found in Guyana, Suriname, Brazil, Ecuador and Trinidad.
