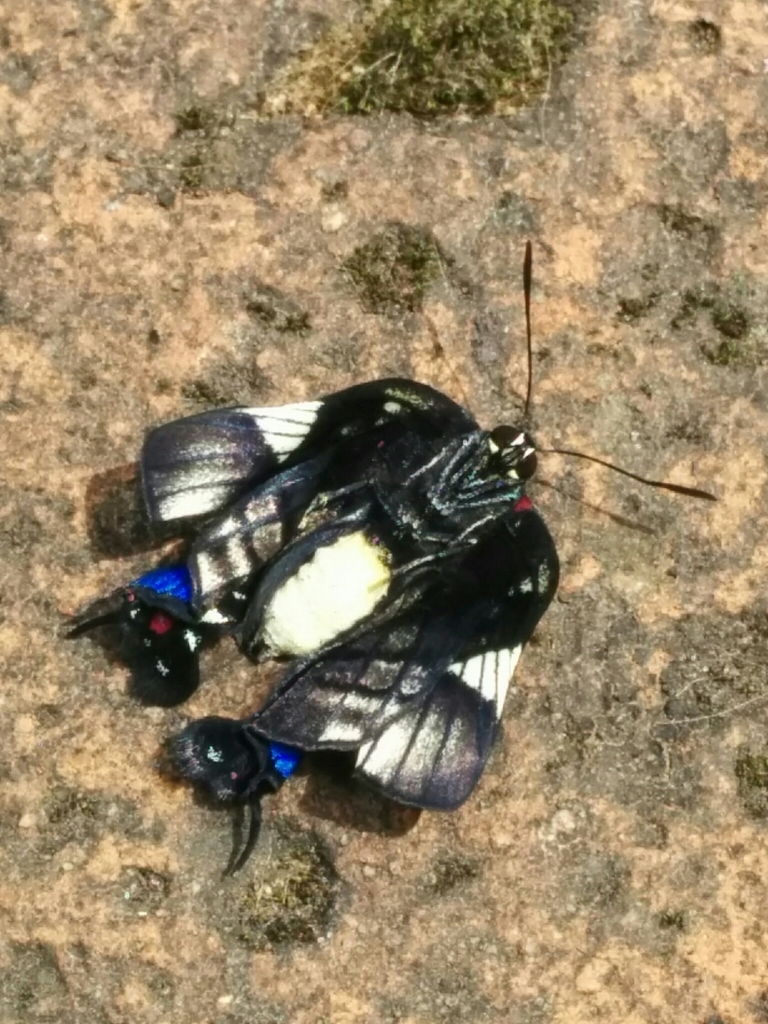

Scientific classification
- Kingdom: Animalia
- Phylum: Arthropoda
- Class: Insecta
- Order: Lepidoptera
- Family: Lycaenidae
- Genus: Panthiades
- Species: P. ochus

Binomial name
- Panthiades ochus (Godman & Salvin, [1887])

Synonyms
- Thecla ochus Godman & Salvin, [1887]

= Panthiades ochus =

Species of butterfly

Panthiades ochus is a butterfly in the family Lycaenidae. It was described by Frederick DuCane Godman and Osbert Salvin in 1887. It is found in Mexico and Guatemala.
