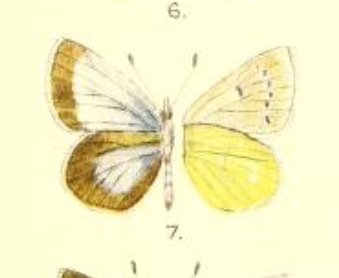

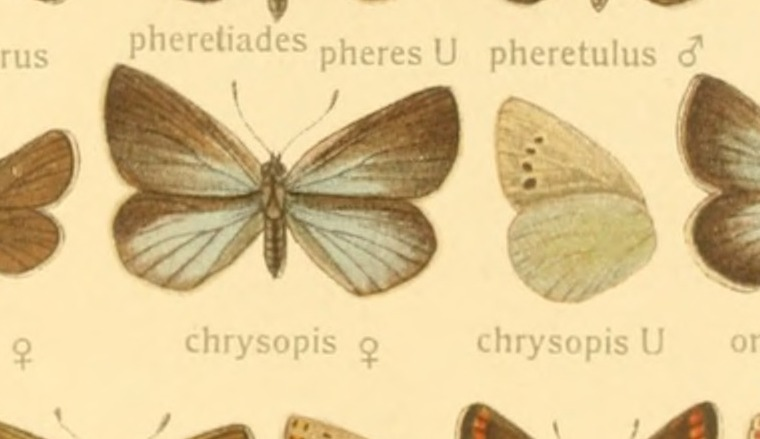

Scientific classification
- Kingdom: Animalia
- Phylum: Arthropoda
- Clade: Pancrustacea
- Class: Insecta
- Order: Lepidoptera
- Family: Lycaenidae
- Genus: Pamiria
- Species: P. chrysopis

Binomial name
- Pamiria chrysopis Grum-Grshimailo, 1888

Synonyms
- Lycaena chrysopis; Albulina omphisa chrysopis

= Pamiria chrysopis =

Species of butterfly

Pamiria chrysopis, also known as the golden green underwing, is a butterfly in the family Lycaenidae. It is found in Central Asia and the Himalayas. It was described by Grigorii Efimovitsch Grum-Grshimailo in 1888.

== Description ==
This species is very similar to Pamiria chitralensis, but the blue on the upperside is darker in chrysopis.

The upperside of the male is violet blue with dark brown borders, while the female is brown and violet blue at the base.

The underside forewing of both sexes is greyish-white and tinged with brown,while the hindwing has a green metallic shimmer.

== Subspecies ==
- Pamiria chrysopis amjadi Charmeux and Mérit, 2017 - Pakistan
- Pamiria chrysopis chrysopis Grum-Grshimailo, 1888 - Kashmir
