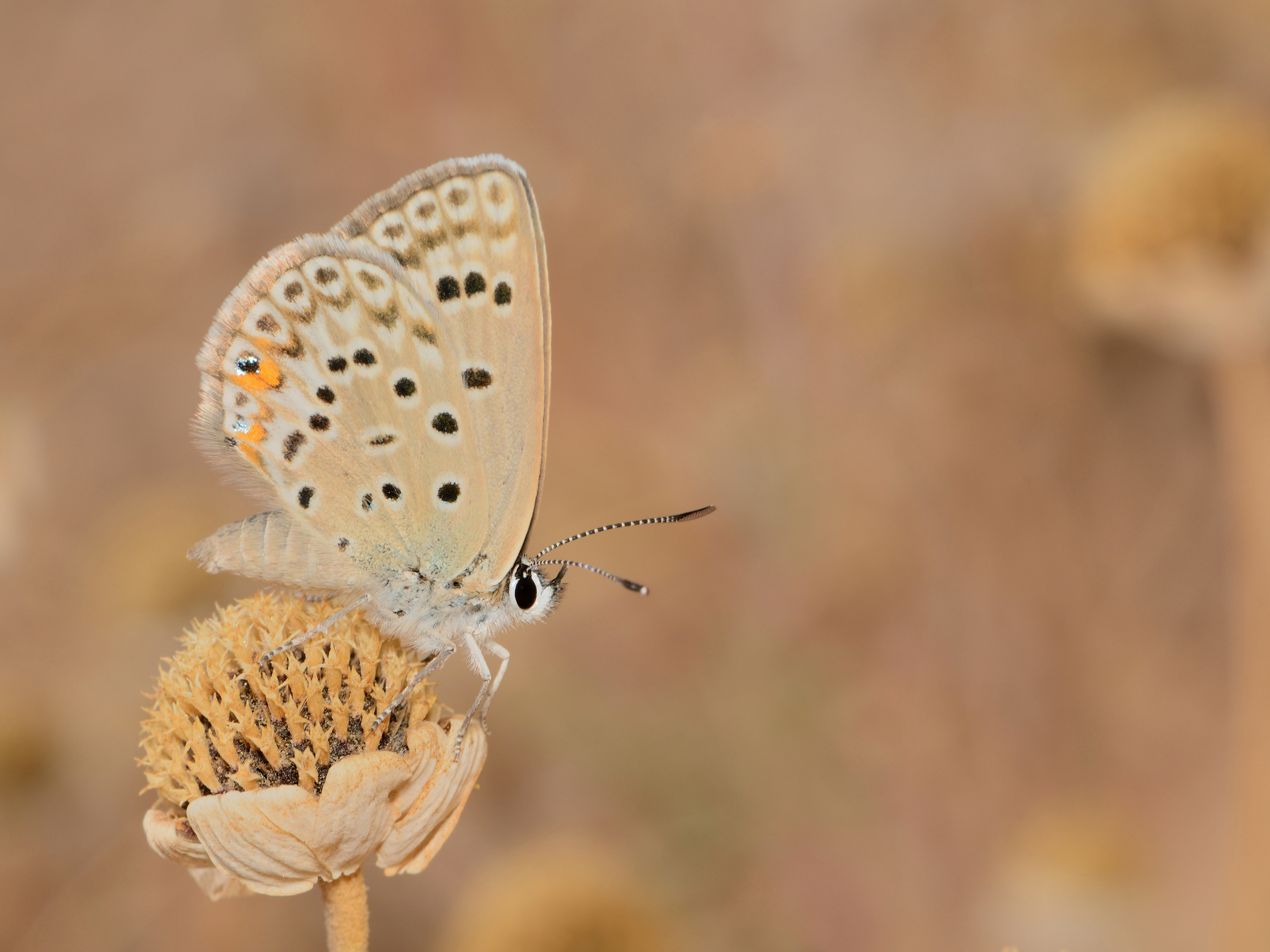

Scientific classification
- Kingdom: Animalia
- Phylum: Arthropoda
- Clade: Pancrustacea
- Class: Insecta
- Order: Lepidoptera
- Family: Lycaenidae
- Genus: Plebejidea
- Species: P. loewii

Binomial name
- Plebejidea loewii (Zeller, 1847)

Synonyms
- Lycaena loewii Zeller, 1847; Plebejus loewii; Albulina loewii; Polyommatus loewii; Polyommatus (Albulina) loewii; Albulina empyrea (Freyer, [1851]); Lycaena loewi var. gigas Staudinger, 1871; Albulina robusta (Turati & Fiori, 1930); Lycaena löwii germaniciae Pfeiffer, 1932; Albulina minimus (Junge & Rose, 1978); Polyommatus loewii afghana Howarth & Povolny, 1976; Polyommatus loewii antilibanotica Hemming, 1929; Lampides uranicola Walker, 1870; Polyommatus loewi lockharti Hemming, 1929; Lampides ferrana Walker, 1870; Lycaena hissarica Shchetkin, 1963

= Plebejidea loewii =

Large jewel blue

Species of butterfly

Plebejidea loewii, the large jewel blue, is a species of blue (Lycaenidae) butterfly.

== Description from Seitz ==
L. loewii Z. (= empyrea Frr.) (78 i). Has the appearance of a small form of the preced ing [L. aliardii]; male above very vividly glossy blue, almost as in bellargus but darker; the female above brown with yellowish red spots in the anal area of the hindwing. Underside with an abundance of ocelli, behind the red submarginal band of the hindwing there are metallic dots. Asia Minor, Armenia, Persia and Turkestan. — The large form gigas Stgr. (78 i, k), from Syria, resembles especially lycidas but the ocelli of the hindwing beneath are larger and placed closer together; moreover, the characteristic intense blue gloss, which no other Blue has in the same tint, is as strong in gigas as in true loewii. — But another form, which flies at Sharud and in Baluchistan and agrees in size with true loewii, is said to be paler violet-blue and has been named chamanica Moore [now full species]. In May and June, locally plentiful.

== Range ==
Northeast Africa, Aegean Islands, Turkey, Syria, Israel, Jordan, Caucasus and Transcaucasia, Russia (Central Caucasus), Iran, Tajikistan, Turkmenistan, United Arab Emirates, Oman, Saudi Arabia, Afghanistan

== Subspecies ==
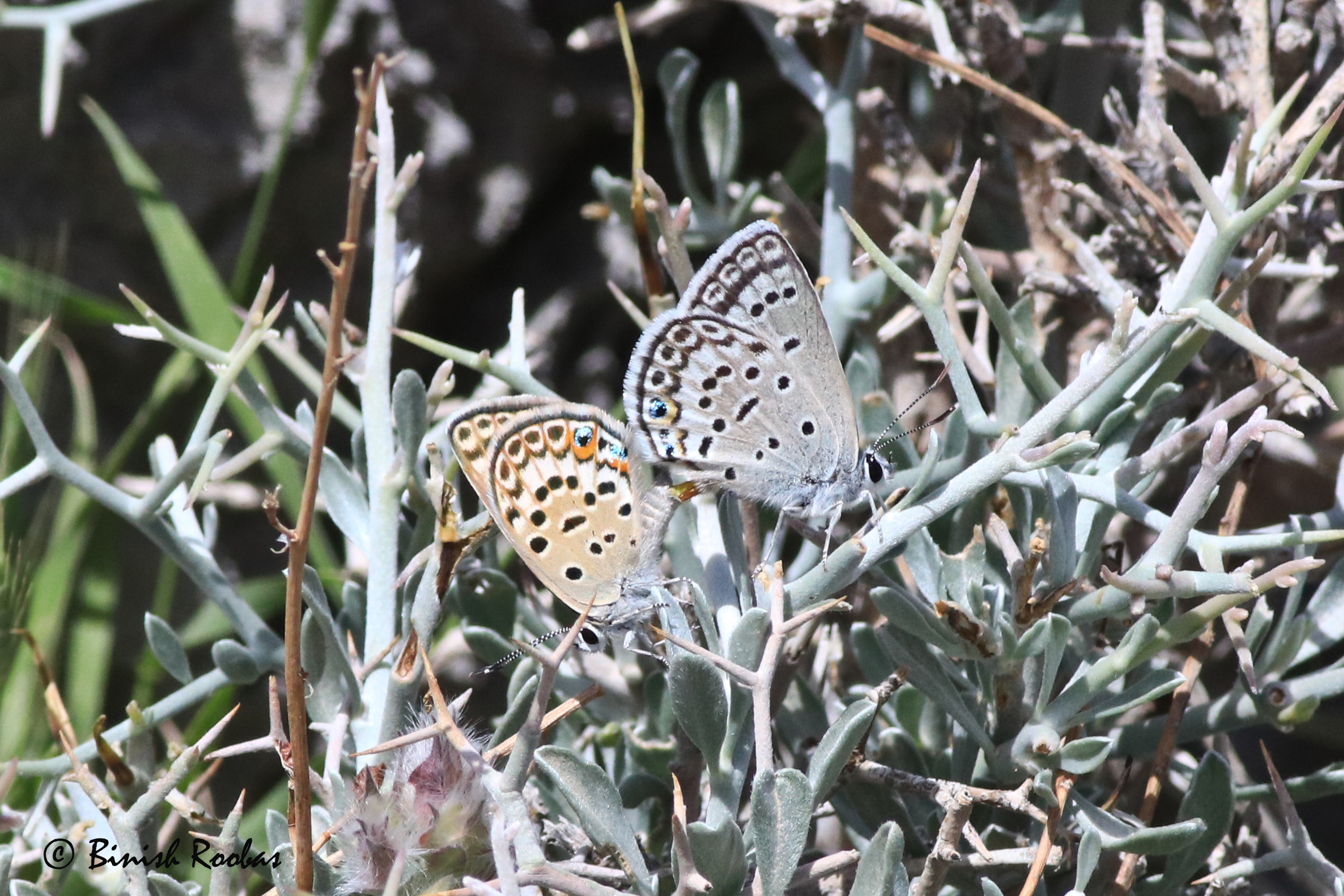
Plebejidea loewii uranicola mating from United Arab Emirates

- Plebejidea loewii afghana (Howarth & Povolny, 1976) – Afghanistan
- Plebejidea loewii antilibanotica (Hemming, 1929) – Lebanon
- Plebejidea loewii battenfeldi(Rose & Schurian, 1977) – Iran
- Plebejidea loewii dzhemagati (Sheljuzhko, 1934) – Russia/Georgia, Azerbaijan (i.e. Caucasus Major).
- Plebejidea loewii laura (Evans, 1932) – India (Ladakh).
- Plebejidea loewii hissarica (Shchetkin, 1963) – India (Ghissar)
- Plebejidea loewii hofmanni (Rose & Schurian, 1977) – Iran
- Plebejidea loewii loewii (Zeller, 1847) – Georgia, Armenia, Kurdistan, Iran (Chitral), Turkestan.
- Plebejidea loewii schwingenschussi (Pfeiffer, 1937) – Azerbaijan/Iran (Talysh Mountains)
- Plebejidea loewii uranicola (Walker, 1870) – Jordan, Israel, Egypt, Saudi Arabia, UAE, Oman.

== Ecology ==
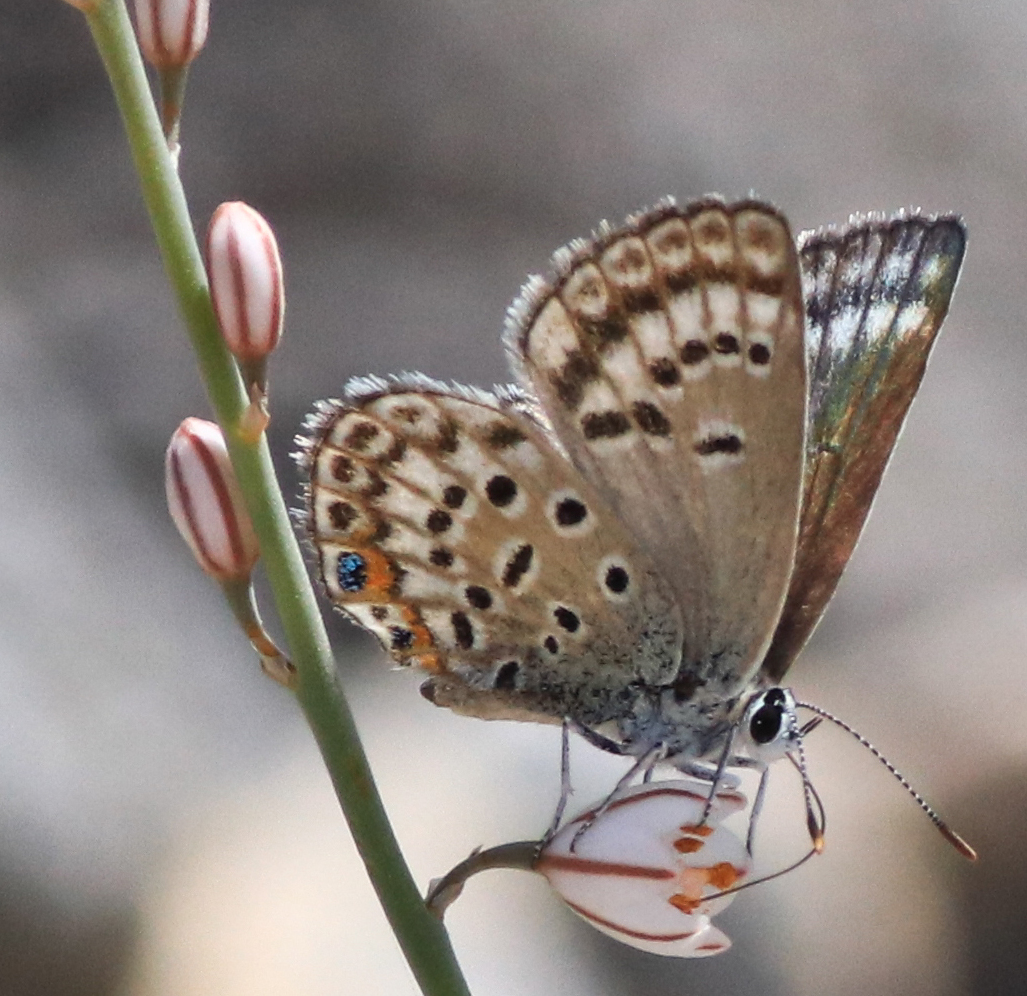
Agrodiaetus loewii uranicola from United Arab Emirates

This species lives very locally on dry stony meadows and other xerophytic biotopes or subalpine meadows. One generation per year. Flight time in June - early August. Female are much less common than males and practically do not leave their habitats. After mating, the female lays one egg each on the stems and leaves of the forage plants of caterpillars - Astragalus spp. Egg discoid, with pronounced cells on the surface. Its color is white with a greenish tinge, the micropyle is green. Eggs hibernate with the already formed caterpillar inside. Caterpillars of the first age are yellowish-green with dark dots and a brownish-black head. They eat up the parenchyma of the leaves, scrape off the juicy inner parts of the stipules, but especially prefer to penetrate into the young buds and eat in them. Caterpillars of the senior, the fifth, age are bright green with a black head. They feed on buds and flowers. By the end of their development, they sometimes acquire a reddish hue. Puppies in shelters - under the bushes of a forage plant or in cracks in the soil, attaching to the substrate a spider's loop. The length of the pupa is 11–12 mm. It is elongated, light green with a dark green dorsal stripe and white spiracles, covered with very short white hairs. The pupa stage is 12–15 days

== Etymology ==
Named for the German entomologist Hermann Loew who collected the first specimens in Turkey.
