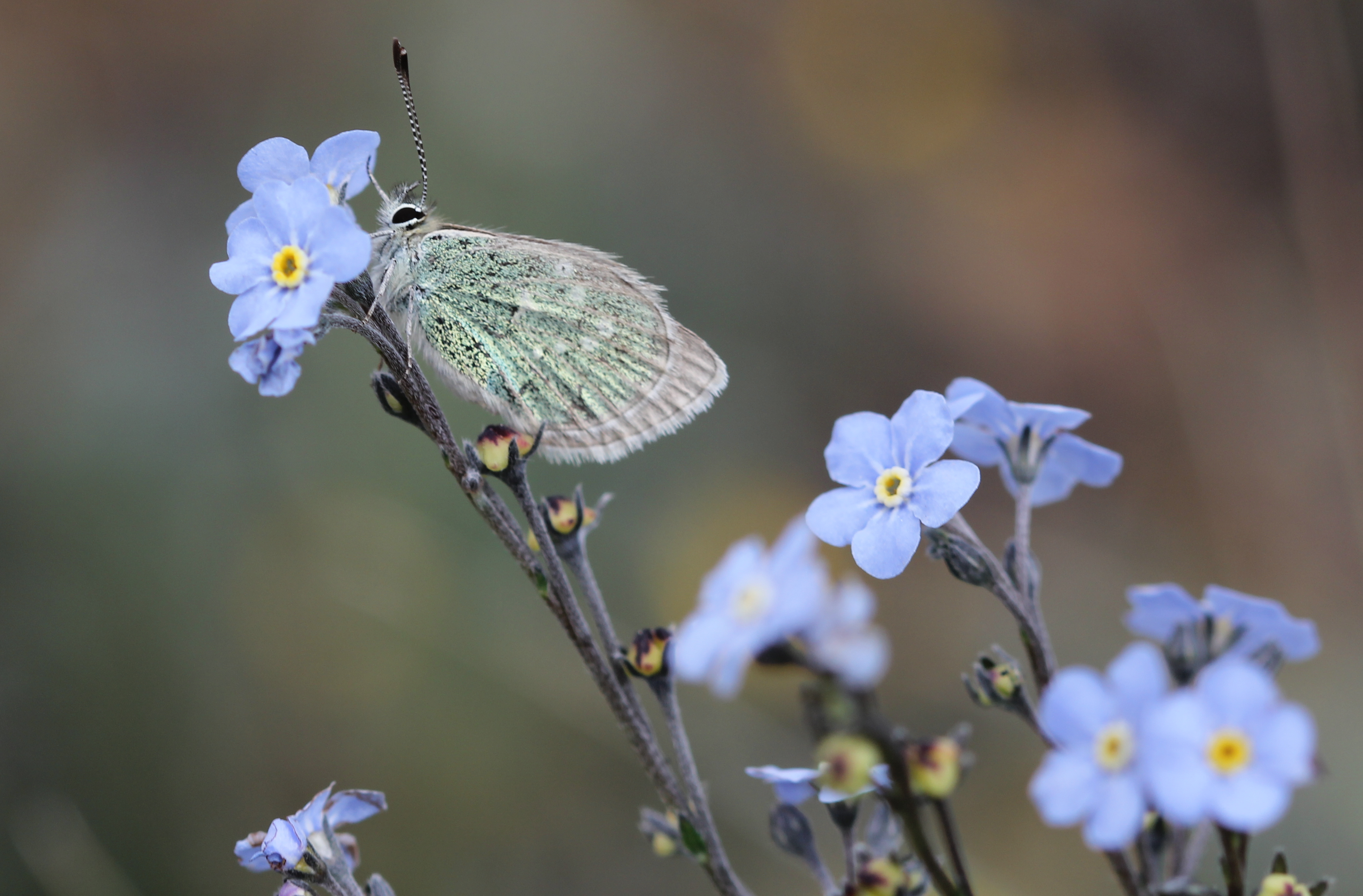

Scientific classification
- Domain: Eukaryota
- Kingdom: Animalia
- Phylum: Arthropoda
- Class: Insecta
- Order: Lepidoptera
- Family: Lycaenidae
- Genus: Pamiria
- Species: P. metallica

Binomial name
- Pamiria metallica (C. & R. Felder, [1865])

Synonyms
- Lycaena metallica C. & R. Felder, [1865]; Polyommatus metallica; Albulina metallica

= Pamiria metallica =

Small green underwing

Species of butterfly

Pamiria metallica, the small green underwing, is a species of butterfly in the family Lycaenidae. It is found in the Himalayas.
