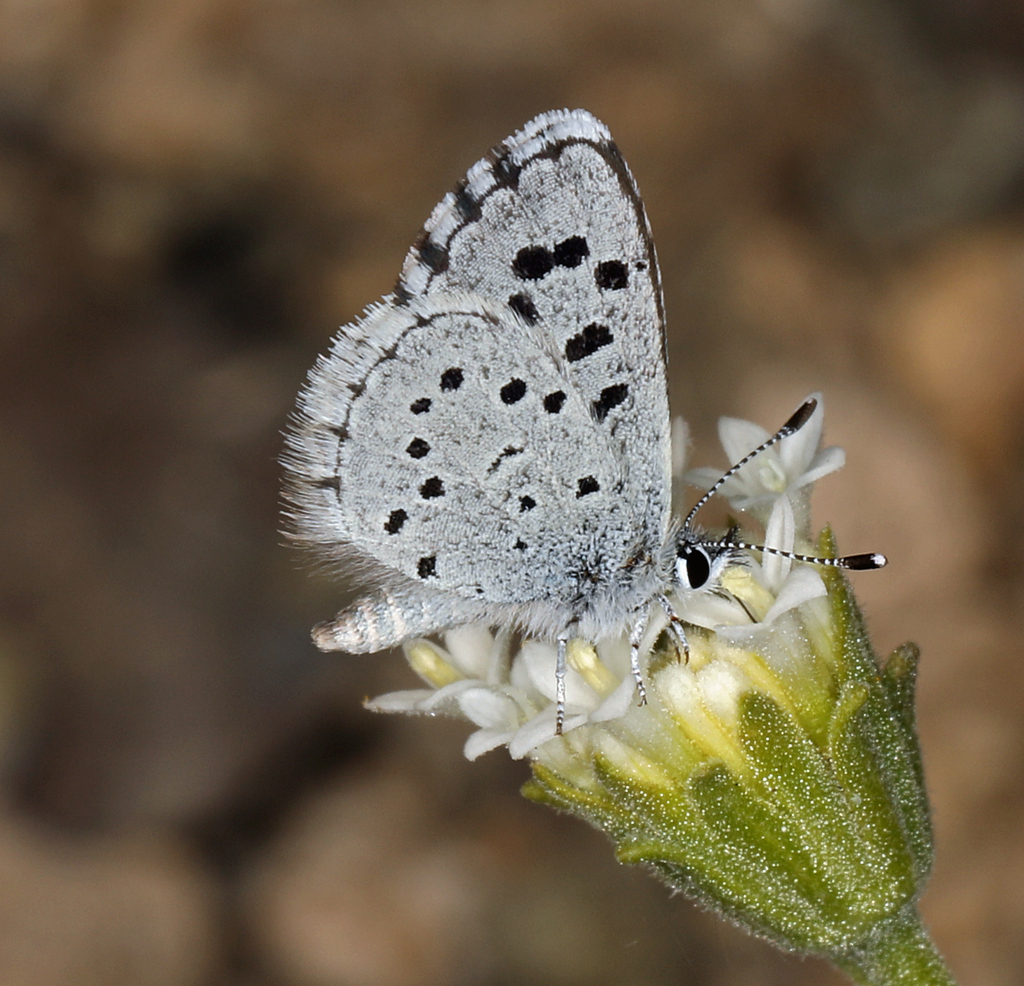

Scientific classification
- Kingdom: Animalia
- Phylum: Arthropoda
- Clade: Pancrustacea
- Class: Insecta
- Order: Lepidoptera
- Family: Lycaenidae
- Genus: Philotiella
- Species: P. speciosa

Binomial name
- Philotiella speciosa (Hy. Edwards, 1877)

= Philotiella speciosa =

Species of butterfly

Philotiella speciosa, the small blue, is a species of blue in the butterfly family Lycaenidae.

== Subspecies ==
These four subspecies belong to the species Philotiella speciosa:

- Philotiella speciosa bohartorum (Tilden, 1969)
- Philotiella speciosa purisima Priestaf & J. Emmel in T. Emmel, 1998 (lompoc blue)
- Philotiella speciosa septentrionalis Austin in T. Emmel, 1998
- Philotiella speciosa speciosa (Hy. Edwards, 1877)
