= Paradeudorix marginata =

Scientific classification
- Domain: Eukaryota
- Kingdom: Animalia
- Phylum: Arthropoda
- Class: Insecta
- Order: Lepidoptera
- Family: Lycaenidae
- Genus: Paradeudorix
- Species: P. marginata

Binomial name
- Paradeudorix marginata (Stempffer, 1962)

Synonyms
- Deudorix (Hypokopelates) marginata Stempffer, 1962

Species of butterfly

Paradeudorix marginata, the black-edged fairy playboy, is a butterfly in the family Lycaenidae. It is found in Nigeria (east and the Cross River loop), Cameroon, the Republic of the Congo, the Central African Republic, the southern and eastern part of the Democratic Republic of the Congo, Uganda and north-western Tanzania. The habitat consists of primary forests.
