= Paradeudorix boormani =

Scientific classification
- Domain: Eukaryota
- Kingdom: Animalia
- Phylum: Arthropoda
- Class: Insecta
- Order: Lepidoptera
- Family: Lycaenidae
- Genus: Paradeudorix
- Species: P. boormani

Binomial name
- Paradeudorix boormani (Larsen, 1996)

Synonyms
- Hypokopelates boormani Larsen, 1996

Species of butterfly

Paradeudorix boormani, the Boorman's fairy playboy, is a butterfly in the family Lycaenidae. It is found in Nigeria. The habitat consists of primary forests.
