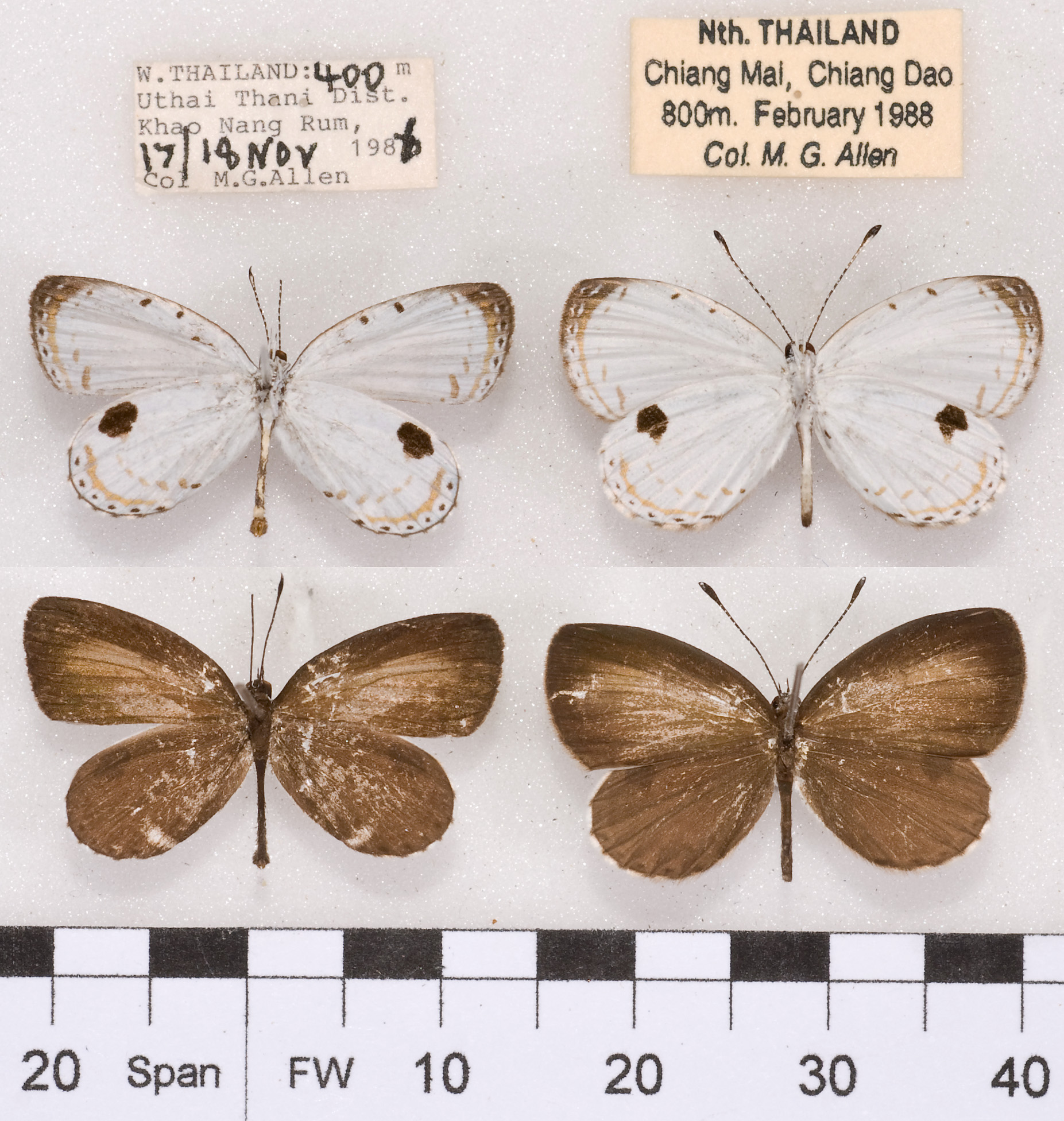

Scientific classification
- Domain: Eukaryota
- Kingdom: Animalia
- Phylum: Arthropoda
- Class: Insecta
- Order: Lepidoptera
- Family: Lycaenidae
- Genus: Pithecops
- Species: P. corvus

Binomial name
- Pithecops corvus (Fruhstorfer, 1919)

Synonyms
- Pithecops hylax corvus Fruhstorfer, 1919; Pithecops hylax corax Fruhstorfer, 1919; Pithecops nihana luzonica Murayama & Okamura, 1973; Pithecops nihana ryukyuensis Shirôzu, 1964; Pithecops correctus Cowan, 1965; Pithecops cornix Cowan, 1965

= Pithecops corvus =

Species of butterfly

Pithecops corvus, the forest Quaker, is a butterfly in the family Lycaenidae. It was described by Hans Fruhstorfer in 1919. It is found in the Indomalayan realm.

The larvae feed on Desmodium, Gardenia and Glycosmis species, including Desmodium lapurnifolium and Desmodium gardneri.

== Subspecies ==
- Pithecops corvus corvus (Sumatra, Peninsular Malaysia, Nias, Borneo)
- Pithecops corvus corax Fruhstorfer, 1919 (Java to the Philippines)
- Pithecops corvus ryukyeuensis Shirôzu, 1964 (Japan: Ryukyus)
- Pithecops corvus correctus Cowan, 1965 (Naga Hills)
- Pithecops corvus cornix Cowan, 1965 (Hainan)
