= Polyniphes =

Scientific classification
- Kingdom: Animalia
- Phylum: Arthropoda
- Clade: Pancrustacea
- Class: Insecta
- Order: Lepidoptera
- Family: Lycaenidae
- Genus: Polyniphes

Butterfly genus in family Lycaenidae

Polyniphes is a genus of butterflies in the family Lycaenidae. It contains two different species, P. dumenilii and P. duponchelii.

== Description ==
The original description of the genus in 1904 was as follows:

Fore-wing with the costa very strongly arched, apex rounded, and outer margin much curved. The discoidal cell very large and bowed out above and below. Discocellulars strongly angled. In the male the whole of the cell with the exception of the basal portion is occupied with a band of brownish-black scales. Antennæ very slightly chequered on the under-side only and fairly stout for a Lycænid. Palpi upturned; the third joint very pointed and ending in a fine bristle. Fore-tibia strongly spined.
