= Parachrysops =

Scientific classification
- Kingdom: Animalia
- Phylum: Arthropoda
- Class: Insecta
- Order: Lepidoptera
- Family: Lycaenidae
- Tribe: Luciini
- Genus: Parachrysops; Bethune-Baker, 1904
- Species: P. bicolor

Binomial name
- Parachrysops bicolor Bethune-Baker, 1904

Monotypic butterfly genus in family Lycaenidae

Parachrysops is a butterfly genus in the family Lycaenidae. It is monotypic, containing only the species Parachrysops bicolor. which is endemic to New Guinea (Aroa River).
