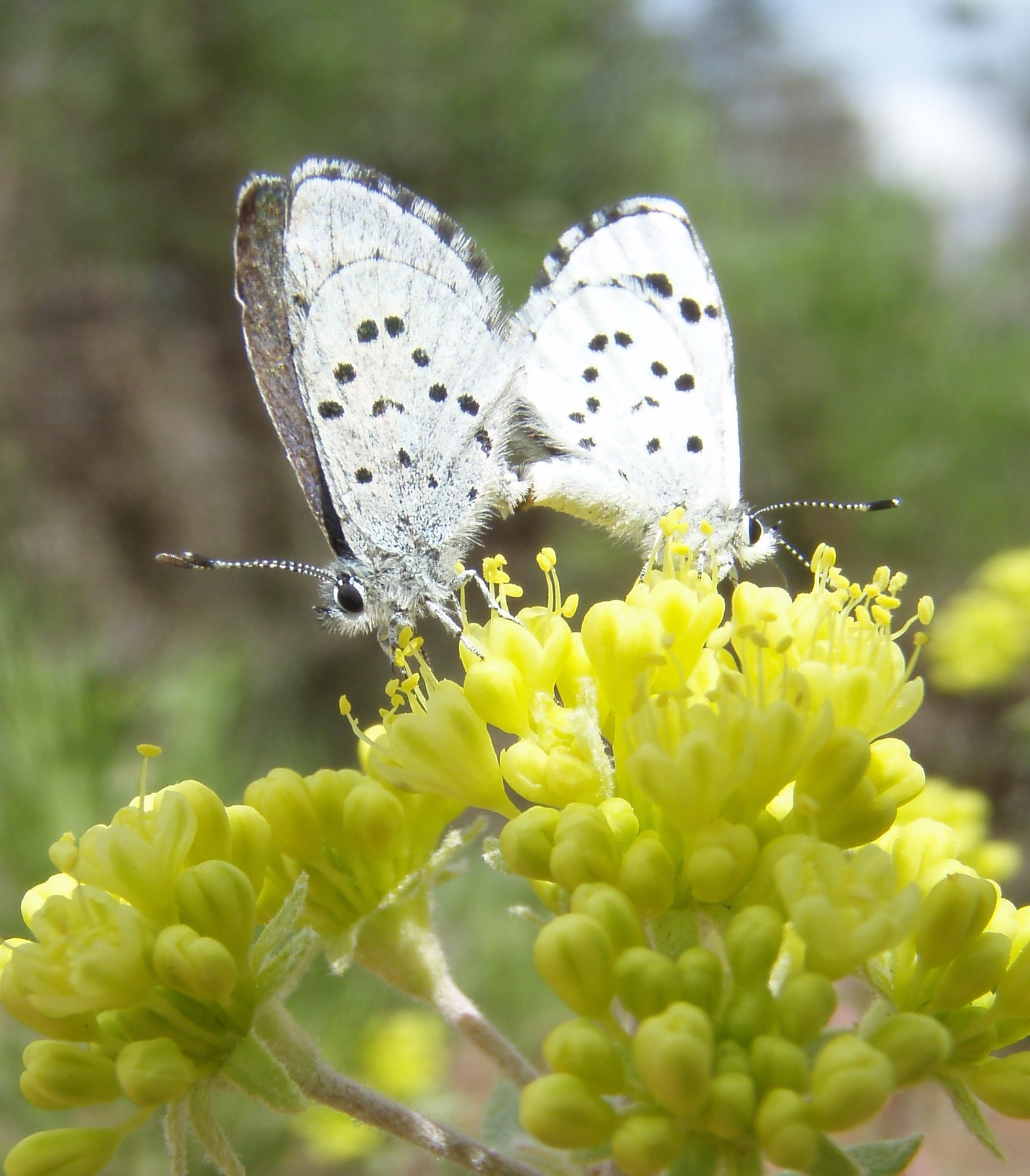
- Philotiella leona

Scientific classification
- Domain: Eukaryota
- Kingdom: Animalia
- Phylum: Arthropoda
- Class: Insecta
- Order: Lepidoptera
- Family: Lycaenidae
- Subfamily: Polyommatinae
- Tribe: Polyommatini
- Genus: Philotiella; Mattoni, 1978

= Philotiella =

Butterfly genus in family Lycaenidae

Philotiella is a genus of "blue" (Polyommatinae) butterflies in the family Lycaenidae found in western North America.

== Species ==
- Philotiella leona (Hammond & McCorkle, 2000) - Leona's Blue
- Philotiella speciosa (H. Edwards, 1877) – small blue
