= Pseudomyrina =

Scientific classification
- Domain: Eukaryota
- Kingdom: Animalia
- Phylum: Arthropoda
- Class: Insecta
- Order: Lepidoptera
- Family: Lycaenidae
- Genus: Pseudomyrina; Druce, 1895

Butterfly genus in family Lycaenidae

Pseudomyrina is a genus of butterflies in the family Lycaenidae.
