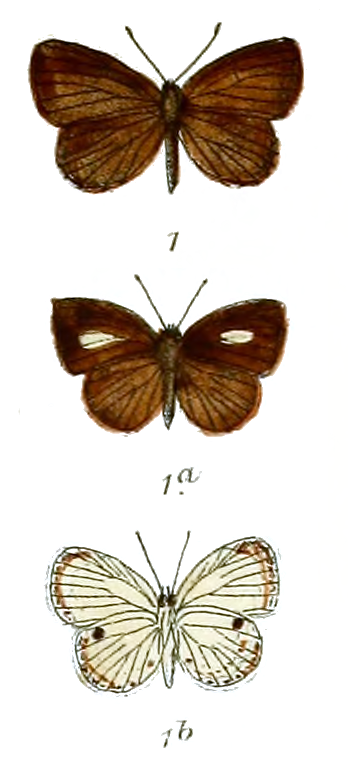

Scientific classification
- Kingdom: Animalia
- Phylum: Arthropoda
- Class: Insecta
- Order: Lepidoptera
- Family: Lycaenidae
- Genus: Pithecops
- Species: P. hylax

Binomial name
- Pithecops hylax Horsfield 1828

= Pithecops hylax =

Forest Quaker

Species of butterfly

Pithecops hylax, the forest Quaker, is a small butterfly found in India that belongs to the lycaenids or blues family.

== Description ==
Male upperside: brown, in fresh specimens generally uniform, in some slightly paler along a posterior area from base outwards on the forewing. This is more commune in the female than in the male. Underside: milk white. Forewing: a few very obscure specks along the costa, and a postdiscal transverse series of four transversely elongate spots, or short broad lines, pale brown; the spots of the latter arranged two subcostal and two posterior close to the tornal angle; beyond these is a continuous transverse broad brown line that gets paler posteriorly, from costa to dorsum, followed by a subterminal series of similarly coloured transverse spots, one in each interspace; at the apex these are generally coalescent with the inner brown line; lastly an anteciliary dark brown line. Cilia dark brown. Hindwing: a curved postdiscal series of transverse pale brown spots that terminate at the costa in a prominent large round black spot; a continuous broad pale brown curved line followed by a subterminal dark brown series of spots and an anteciliary line as on the forewing. Cilia white. Antennae, head, thorax and abdomen brown; the antennae spotted with white on the inner side: beneath: the palpi, thorax and abdomen white.

== See also ==
- List of butterflies of India
- List of butterflies of India (Lycaenidae)
