= Pseudochliaria =

Scientific classification
- Domain: Eukaryota
- Kingdom: Animalia
- Phylum: Arthropoda
- Class: Insecta
- Order: Lepidoptera
- Family: Lycaenidae
- Genus: Pseudochliaria

Butterfly genus in family Lycaenidae

Pseudochliaria is a genus of butterflies in the family Lycaenidae.

The type species for the genus is the species Pseudochliaria virgoides, which is thought to be the same as Hypolycaena virgo.
