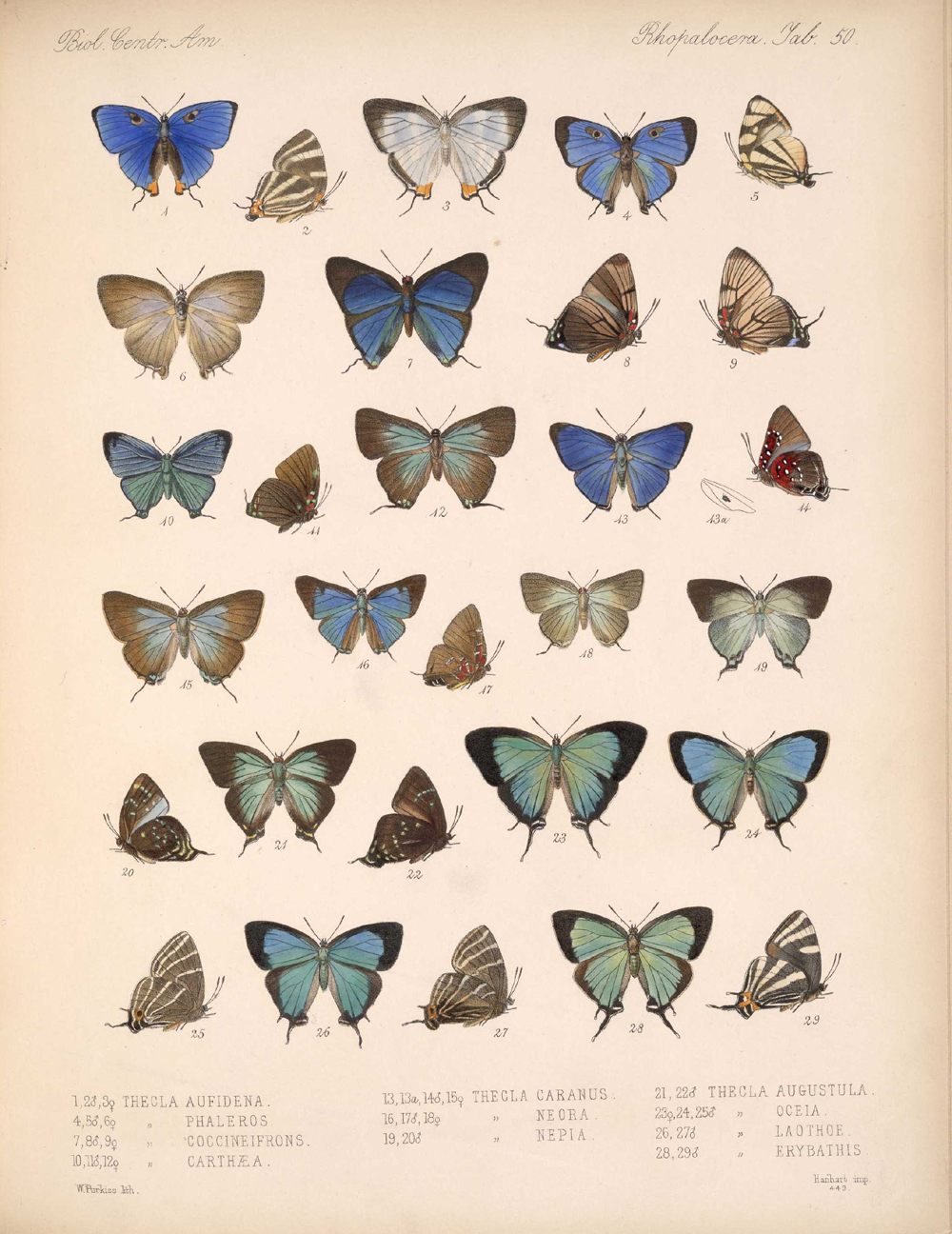
- Panthiades and related genera

Scientific classification
- Kingdom: Animalia
- Phylum: Arthropoda
- Class: Insecta
- Order: Lepidoptera
- Family: Lycaenidae
- Tribe: Eumaeini
- Genus: Panthiades; Hübner, [1819]

Synonyms
- Cycnus Hübner, [1819]

= Panthiades =

Butterfly genus in family Lycaenidae

Panthiades is a genus of butterflies in the family Lycaenidae. The species of this genus are found in the Neotropical realm.

== Species ==
- Panthiades aeolus (Fabricius, 1775)
- Panthiades bathildis (C. & R. Felder, 1865)
- Panthiades bitias (Cramer, [1777])
- Panthiades boreas (C. & R. Felder, 1865)
- Panthiades hebraeus (Hewitson, 1867)
- Panthiades ochus (Godman & Salvin, [1887])
- Panthiades paphlagon (C. & R. Felder, 1865)
- Panthiades phaleros (Linnaeus, 1767)
