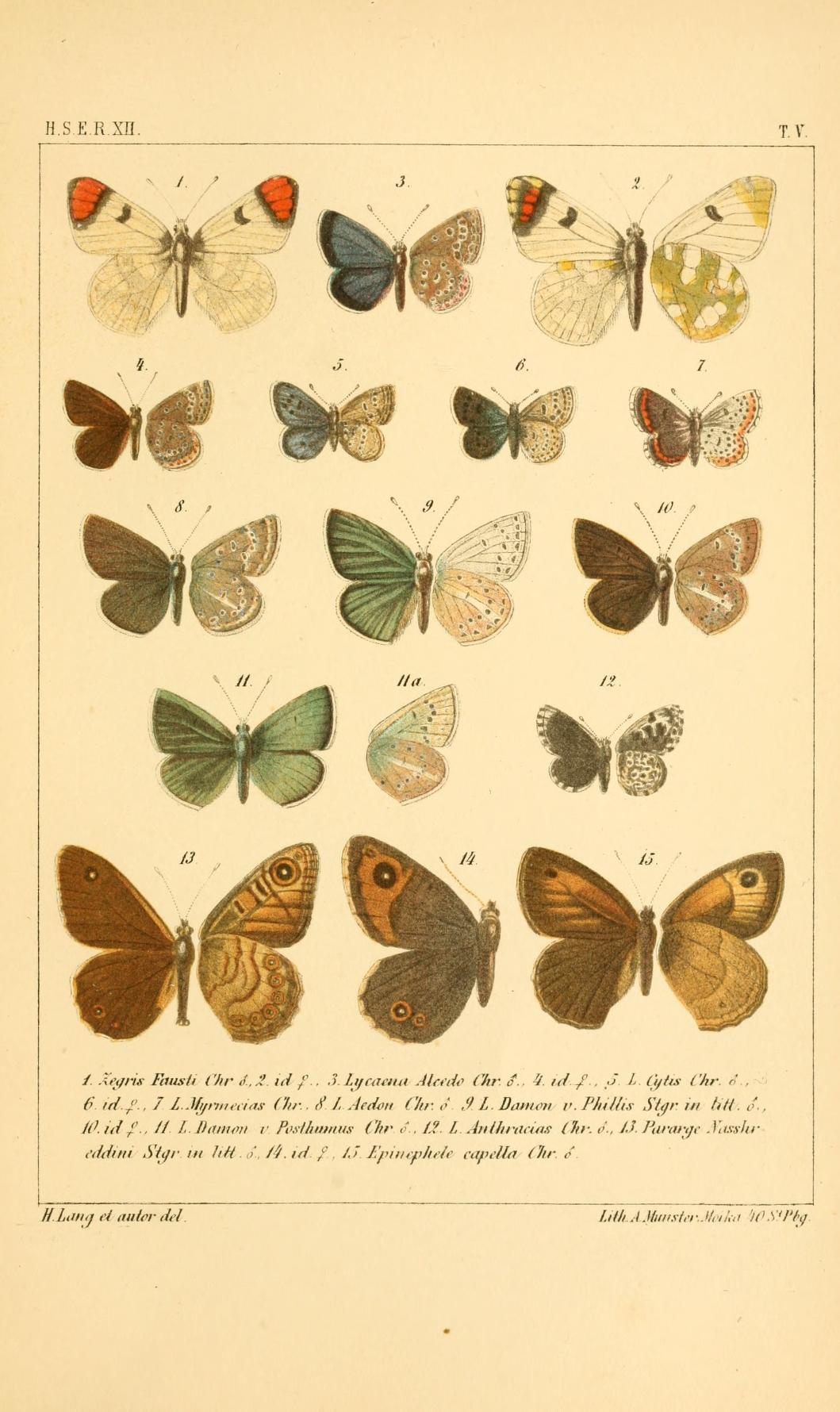
- Praephilotes anthracias figure 12

Scientific classification
- Domain: Eukaryota
- Kingdom: Animalia
- Phylum: Arthropoda
- Class: Insecta
- Order: Lepidoptera
- Family: Lycaenidae
- Subfamily: Polyommatinae
- Tribe: Polyommatini
- Genus: Praephilotes; Forster, 1938

= Praephilotes =

Butterfly genus in family Lycaenidae

Praephilotes is a genus of butterflies in the family Lycaenidae.

It contains two species:

- Praephilotes anthracias (Christoph, 1877)
- Praephilotes violacea Howarth & Povolný, 1976
