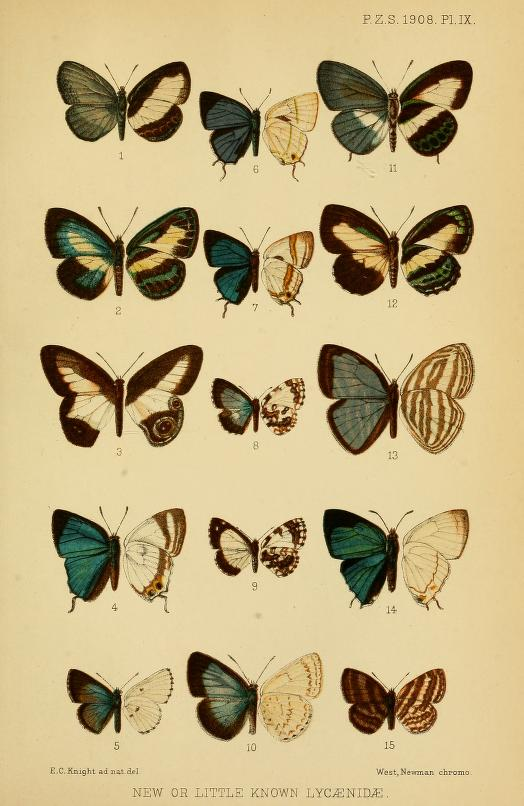
- Fig. 7 Paradeudorix ituri

Scientific classification
- Domain: Eukaryota
- Kingdom: Animalia
- Phylum: Arthropoda
- Class: Insecta
- Order: Lepidoptera
- Family: Lycaenidae
- Tribe: Theclini
- Genus: Paradeudorix; Libert, 2004

= Paradeudorix =

Deudorix

Butterfly genus in family Lycaenidae

Paradeudorix is a genus of butterflies in the family Lycaenidae. The species of this genus are found in the Afrotropical realm.

== Species ==
- Paradeudorix boormani (Larsen, 1996)
- Paradeudorix cobaltina (Stempffer, 1964)
- Paradeudorix eleala (Hewitson, 1865)
- Paradeudorix ituri (Bethune-Baker, 1908)
- Paradeudorix marginata (Stempffer, 1962)
- Paradeudorix michelae Libert, 2004
- Paradeudorix moyambina (Bethune-Baker, 1904)
- Paradeudorix petersi (Stempffer & Bennett, 1956)
