= Pseudiolaus =

Scientific classification
- Domain: Eukaryota
- Kingdom: Animalia
- Phylum: Arthropoda
- Class: Insecta
- Order: Lepidoptera
- Family: Lycaenidae
- Genus: Pseudiolaus

Genus of butterflies

Pseudiolaus is a genus of butterflies in the family Lycaenidae. It is also considered a subgenus of Iolaus.
