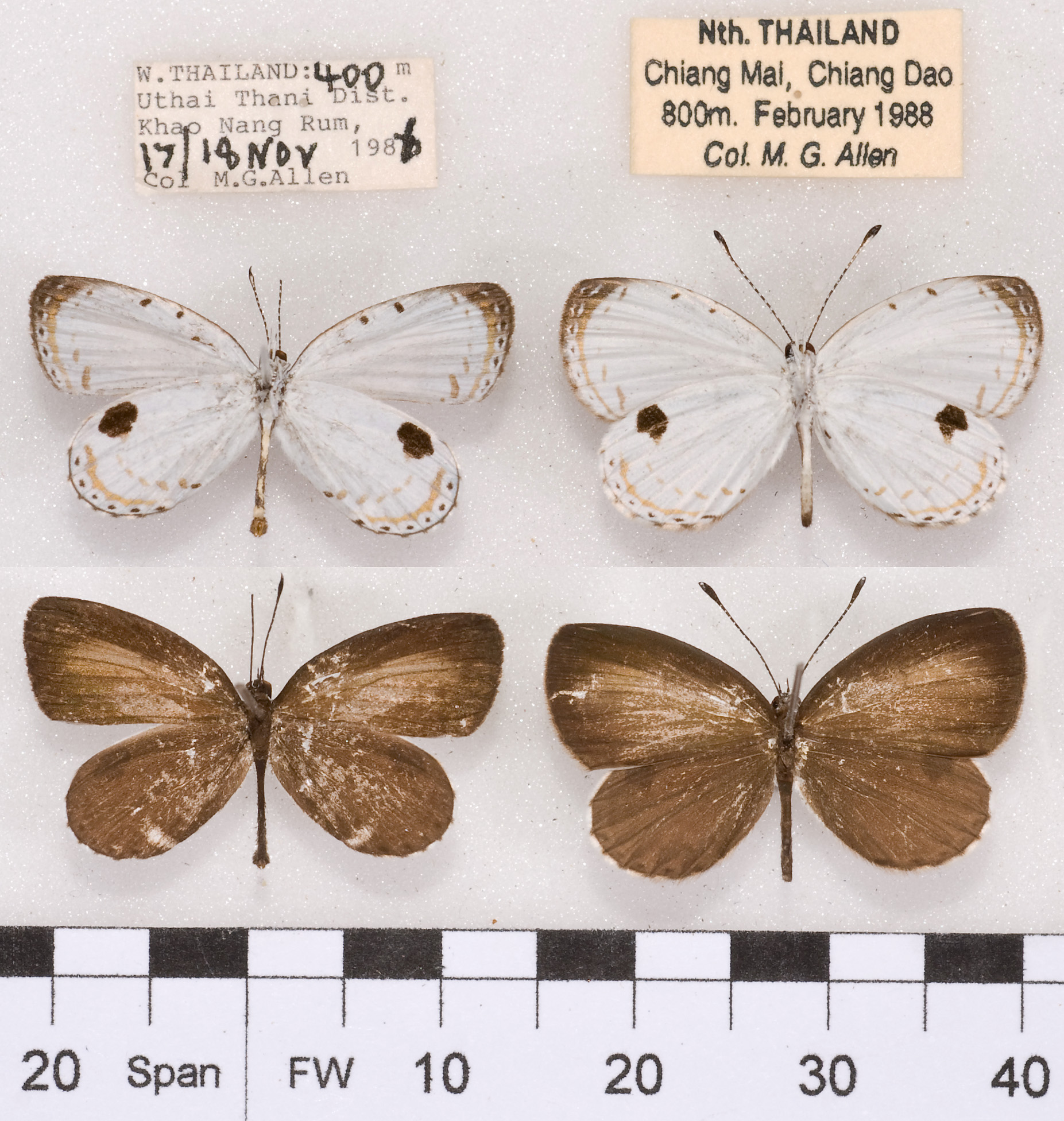
- Pithecops corvus correctus

Scientific classification
- Domain: Eukaryota
- Kingdom: Animalia
- Phylum: Arthropoda
- Class: Insecta
- Order: Lepidoptera
- Family: Lycaenidae
- Subfamily: Polyommatinae
- Tribe: Polyommatini
- Genus: Pithecops; Horsfield, 1828

Synonyms
- Eupsychellus Röber, 1891

= Pithecops =

Butterfly genus in family Lycaenidae

Pithecops is a genus of butterflies in the family Lycaenidae erected by Thomas Horsfield in 1828.

Species include:

- Pithecops corvus Fruhstorfer, 1919
- Pithecops dionisius (Boisduval, 1832) Moluccas, New Guinea, Bismarck Archipelage, Solomon Islands
- Pithecops fulgens Doherty 1889 - blue Quaker
- Pithecops hylax Horsfield 1828 - forest Quaker
- Pithecops mariae de Nicéville, 1894 Sumatra, Borneo.
- Pithecops phoenix (Röber, 1886) Celebes
