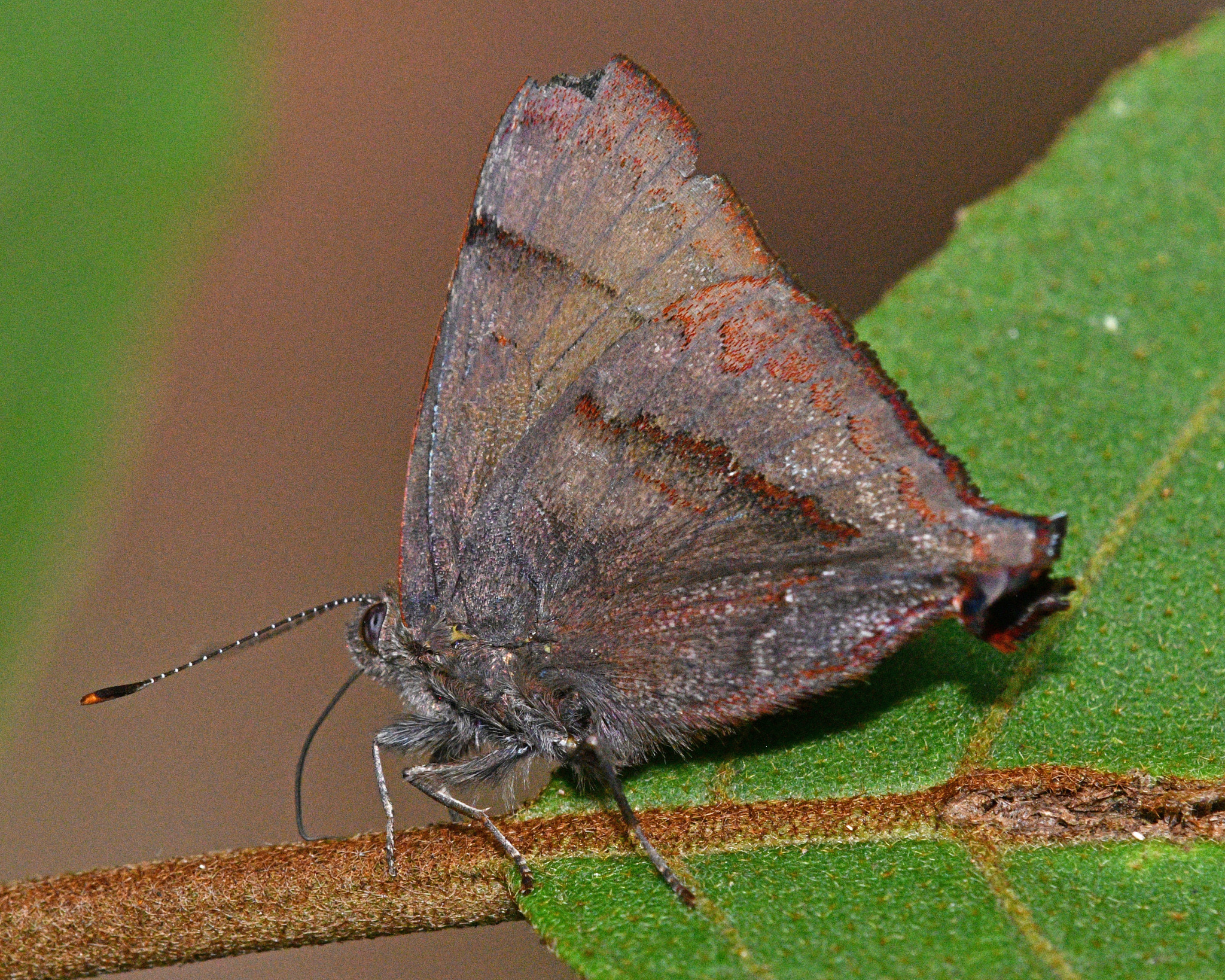
- Penaincisalia juliae

Scientific classification
- Kingdom: Animalia
- Phylum: Arthropoda
- Clade: Pancrustacea
- Class: Insecta
- Order: Lepidoptera
- Family: Lycaenidae
- Tribe: Eumaeini
- Genus: Penaincisalia; Johnson, 1990

Synonyms
- Abloxurina K.Johnson, 1992; Candora K.Johnson, 1992; Pons K.Johnson, 1992; Thecloxurina K.Johnson, 1992

= Penaincisalia =

Butterfly genus in family Lycaenidae

Penaincisalia is a genus of butterflies in the family Lycaenidae. It contains the following species, all found in the Neotropical realm:

partial list

- Penaincisalia alatus Druce 1907
- Penaincisalia anosma Draudt 1921
- Penaincisalia atymna (Hewitson, 1870)
- Penaincisalia bimediana Johnson 1990
- Penaincisalia candor Druce 1907
- Penaincisalia carmela Johnson 1990
- Penaincisalia caudata Johnson 1990
- Penaincisalia culminicola Staudinger 1894
- Penaincisalia descimoni Johnson 1990
- Penaincisalia downeyi Johnson 1990
- Penaincisalia loxurina (C. & R. Felder, 1865)
- Penaincisalia oribata Weymer 1890
- Penaincisalia patagonaevaga Johnson 1990
- Penaincisalia pichincha Johnson 1990
- Penaincisalia rawlinsi Johnson 1990
