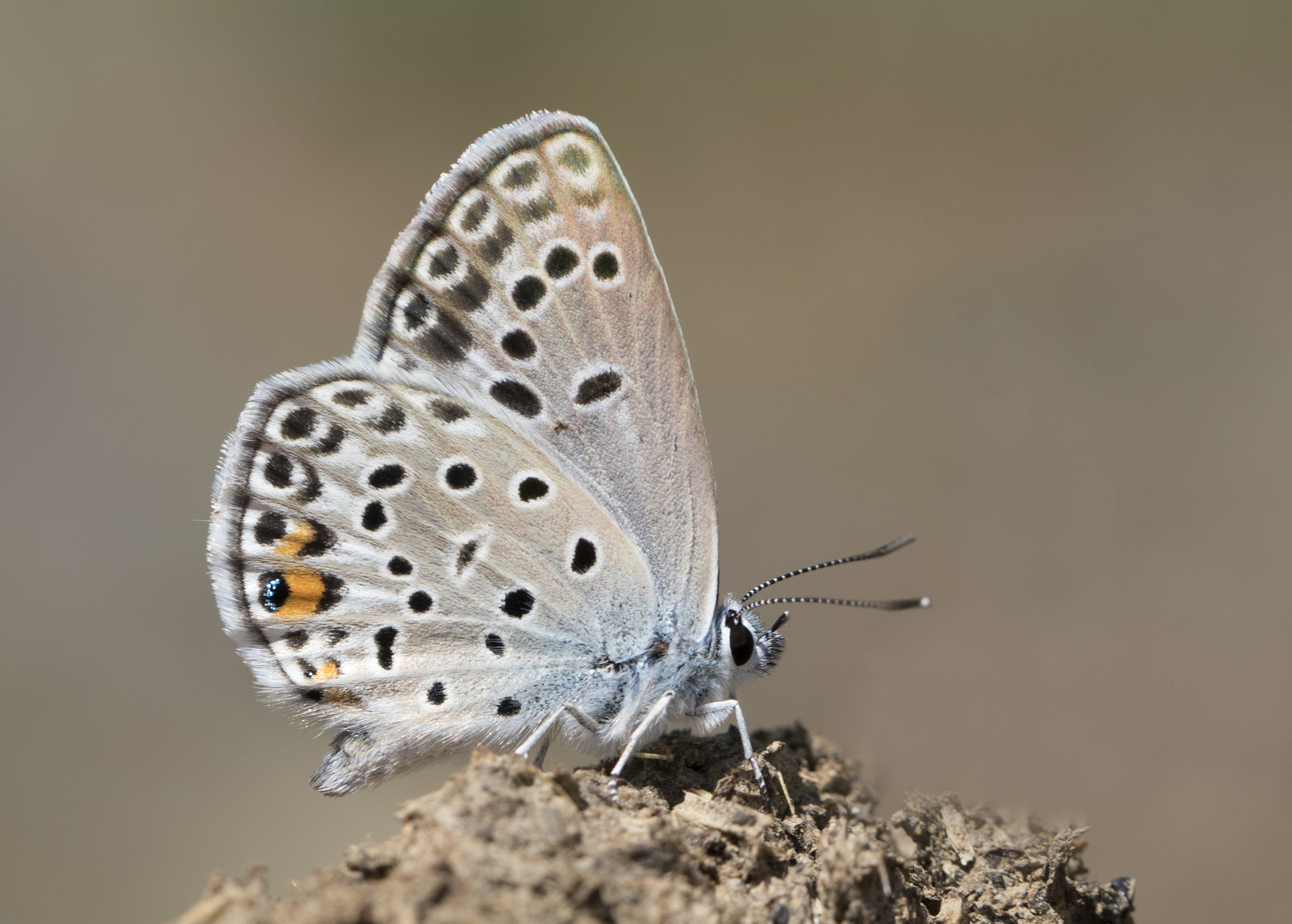
- Plebejidea loewii

Scientific classification
- Kingdom: Animalia
- Phylum: Arthropoda
- Clade: Pancrustacea
- Class: Insecta
- Order: Lepidoptera
- Family: Lycaenidae
- Subfamily: Polyommatinae
- Tribe: Polyommatini
- Genus: Plebejidea; Koçak, 1983

= Plebejidea =

Butterfly genus in family Lycaenidae

Plebejidea is a Palearctic genus of butterflies in the family Lycaenidae.

== Species ==
Species include:

- Plebejidea afshar (Eckweiler, 1998) – Iran
- Plebejidea chamanica (Moore, 1884) Israel Levant
- Plebejidea loewii (Zeller, 1847) – Lebanon to India
- Plebejidea sanoga (Evans, 1925) – India, etc. (West Himalaya)
