= Plesiocyanophrys =

Scientific classification (disputed)
- Kingdom: Animalia
- Phylum: Arthropoda
- Clade: Pancrustacea
- Class: Insecta
- Order: Lepidoptera
- Family: Lycaenidae
- Genus: Plesiocyanophrys; Johnson, Eisele & MacPherson, 1993

Type species
- Theda goodsoni Clench, 1946

Butterfly genus in family Lycaenidae

Plesiocyanophrys is a genus of butterflies in the family Lycaenidae. It has an uncertain status; some sources list it as a synonym of Cyanophrys following Pelham (2008).
