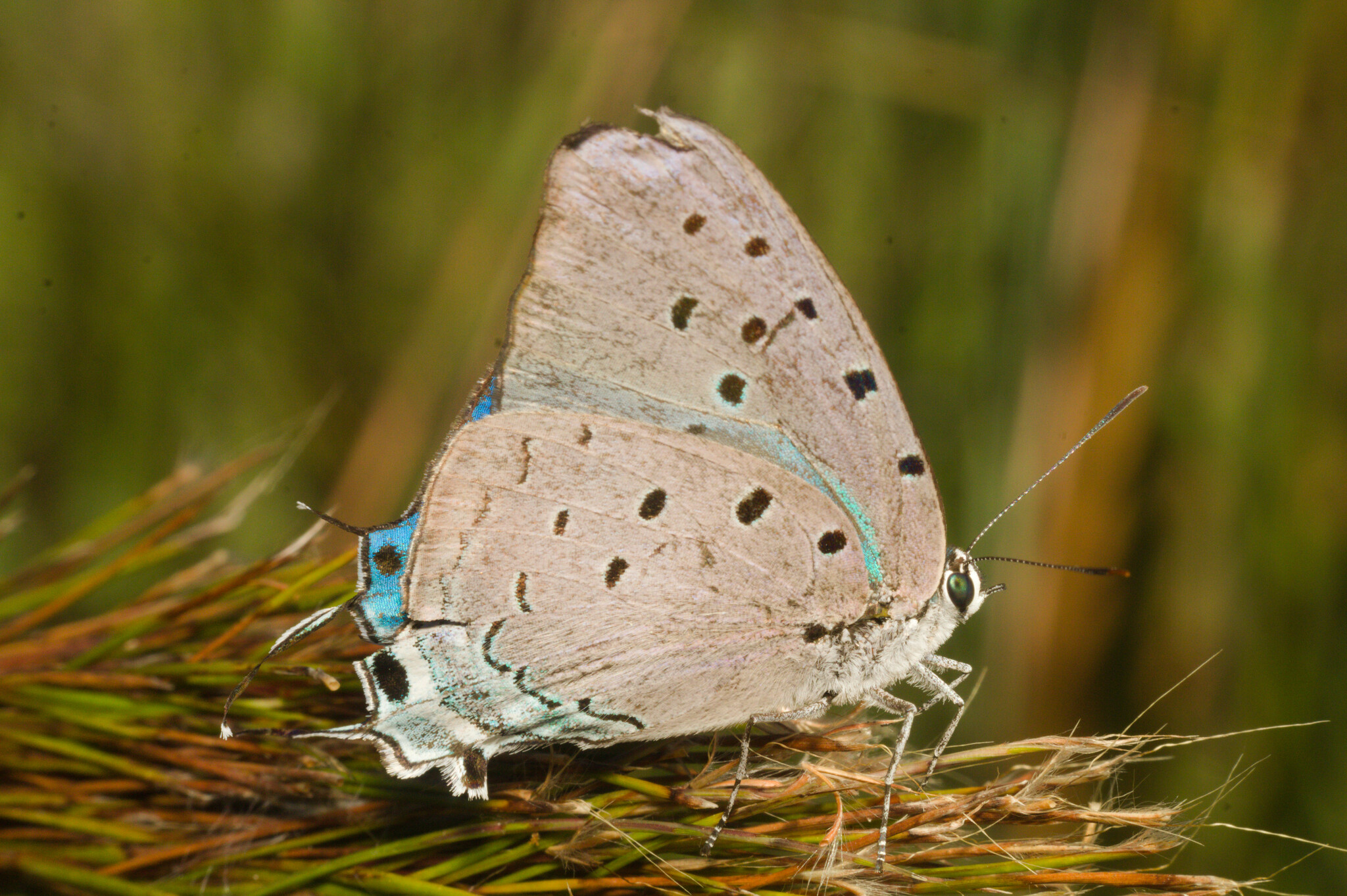
- Pseudolycaena marsyas, Brasil

Scientific classification
- Domain: Eukaryota
- Kingdom: Animalia
- Phylum: Arthropoda
- Class: Insecta
- Order: Lepidoptera
- Family: Lycaenidae
- Subfamily: Theclinae
- Tribe: Eumaeini
- Genus: Pseudolycaena; Wallengren, 1858

= Pseudolycaena =

Genus of butterflies

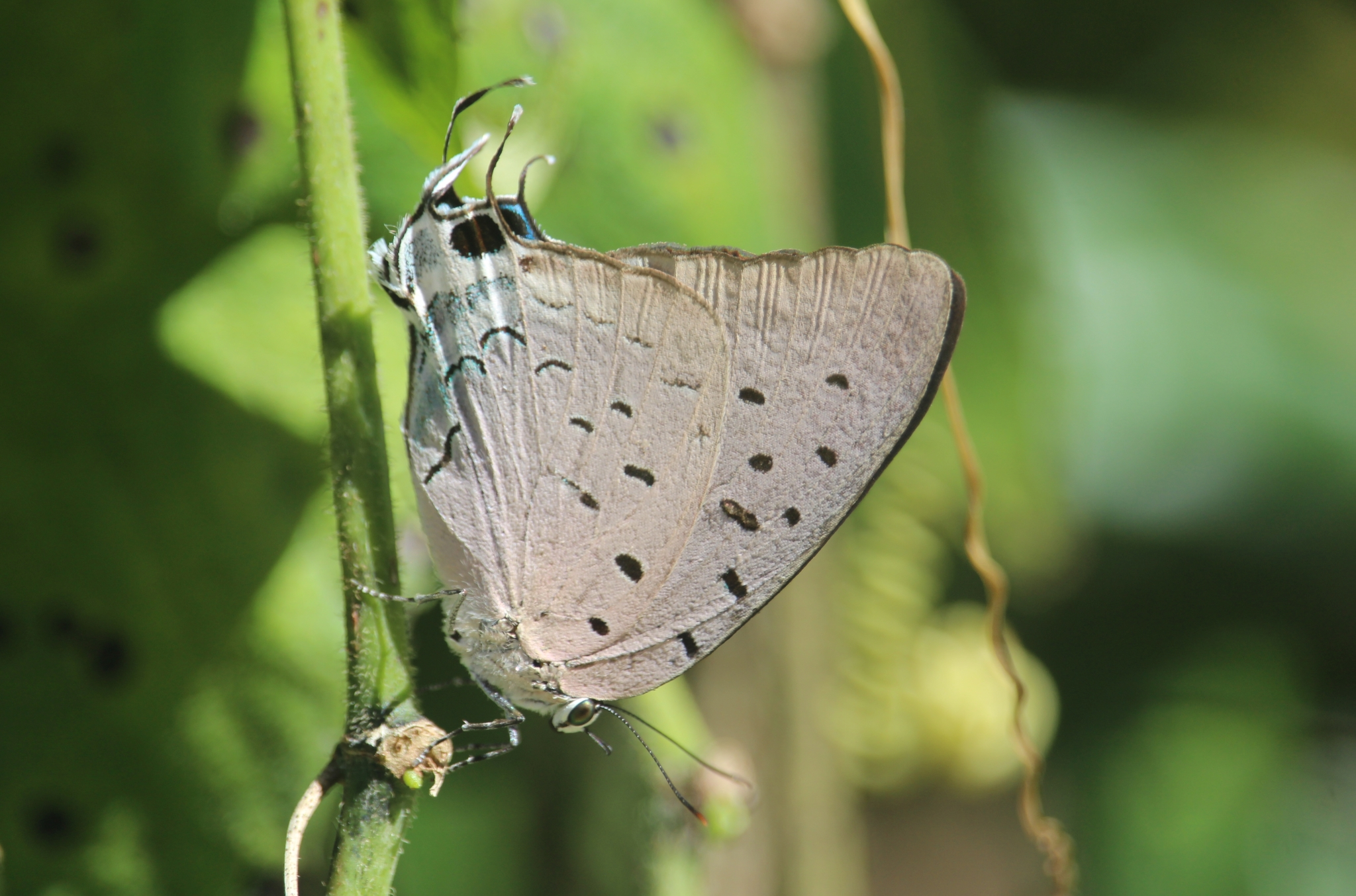
Pseudolycaena damo, Guatemala

Pseudolycaena is a genus of hairstreaks in the butterfly family Lycaenidae. There are at two described species in Pseudolycaena found in Mexico, Central America, and South America, according to research published in 2019.

== Species ==
These species belong to the genus Pseudolycaena:

- Pseudolycaena damo (H. Druce, 1875) (Mexico to Panama, else disjunct Ecuador to Peru)
- Pseudolycaena marsyas (Linnaeus, 1758) (South America)

From one to five species have been classified in this genus in the past, but phylogenetic analyses published in 2019 could not confirm the validity of more than two species, and excluded Pseudolycaena cybele, Pseudolycaena dorcas, and Pseudolycaena nellyae.
