= Philiolaus =

Scientific classification
- Domain: Eukaryota
- Kingdom: Animalia
- Phylum: Arthropoda
- Class: Insecta
- Order: Lepidoptera
- Family: Lycaenidae
- Genus: Iolaus
- Subgenus: Philiolaus; Stempffer & Bennett, 1958

Butterfly subgenus in family Lycaenidae

Philiolaus is a subgenus of butterflies in the genus Iolaus.
