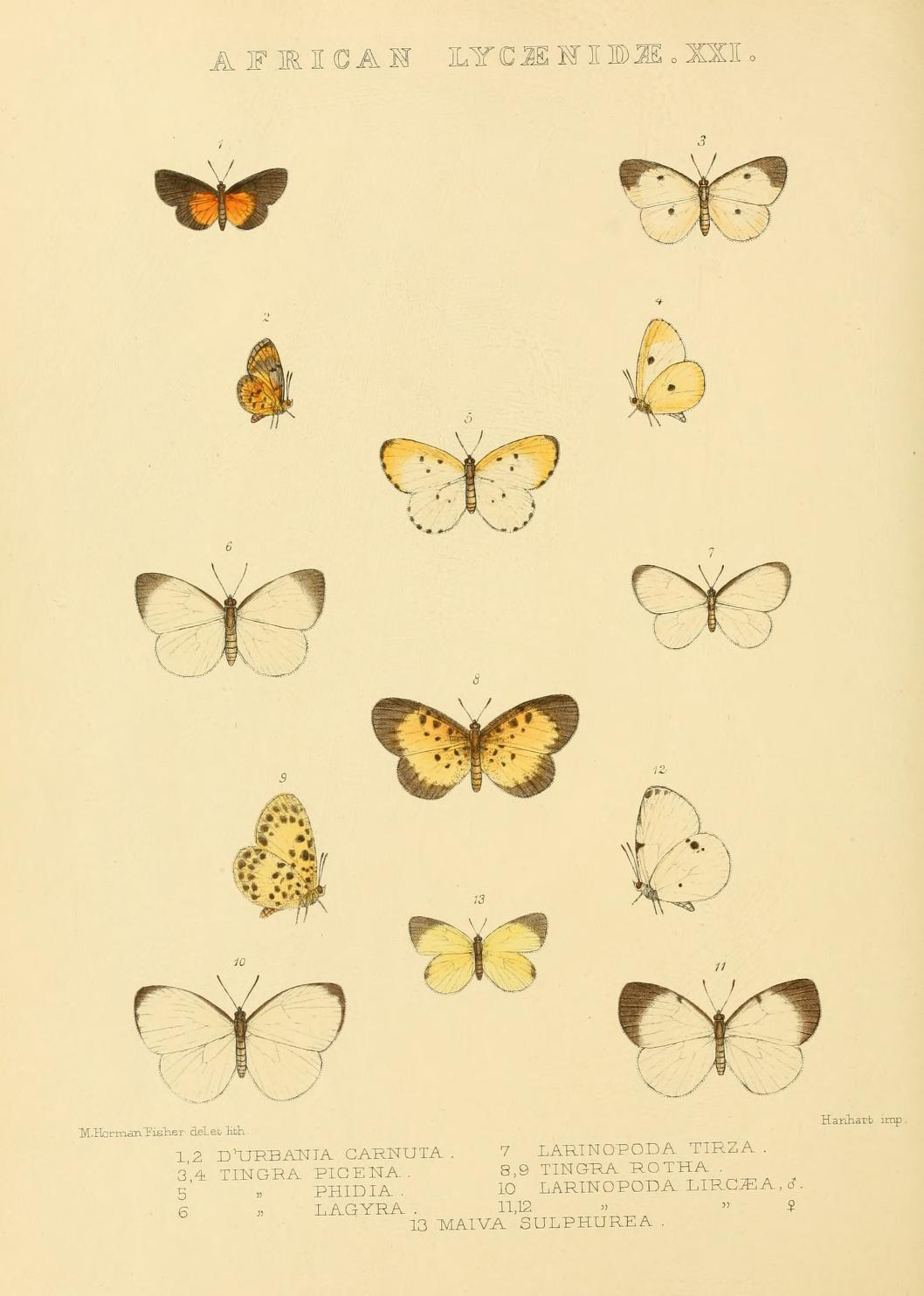
- Ptelina carnuta as Durbania carnuta figures 1,2

Scientific classification
- Kingdom: Animalia
- Phylum: Arthropoda
- Clade: Pancrustacea
- Class: Insecta
- Order: Lepidoptera
- Family: Lycaenidae
- Subfamily: Poritiinae
- Genus: Ptelina; Clench, 1965

= Ptelina =

Butterfly genus in family Lycaenidae

Ptelina is a genus of butterflies in the family Lycaenidae. The genus is endemic to the Afrotropics.

== Species ==
- Ptelina carnuta (Hewitson, 1873)
- Ptelina subhyalina (Joicey & Talbot, 1921)
