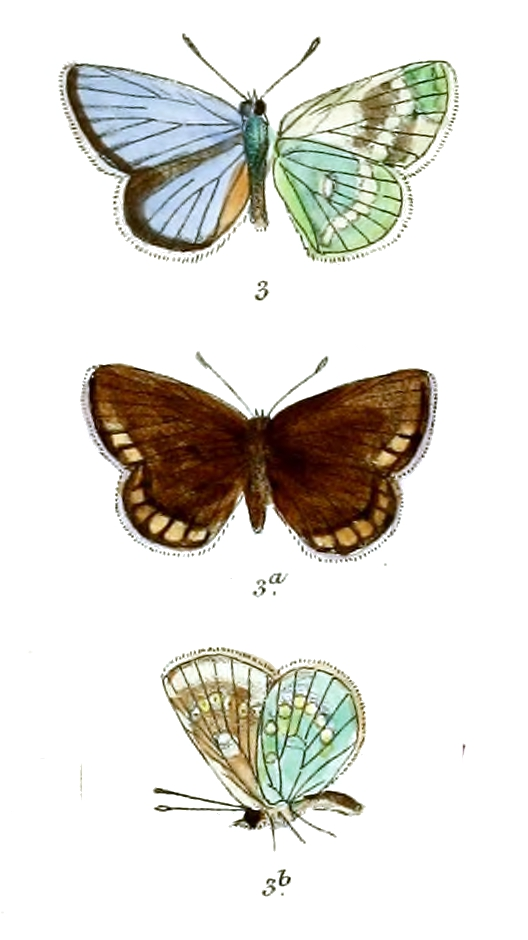
- Illustration of Pamiria metallica.

Scientific classification
- Domain: Eukaryota
- Kingdom: Animalia
- Phylum: Arthropoda
- Class: Insecta
- Order: Lepidoptera
- Family: Lycaenidae
- Subfamily: Polyommatinae
- Tribe: Polyommatini
- Genus: Pamiria; Zhdanko, 1995

= Pamiria =

Butterfly genus in family Lycaenidae

Pamiria is a Palearctic genus of butterflies in the family Lycaenidae.

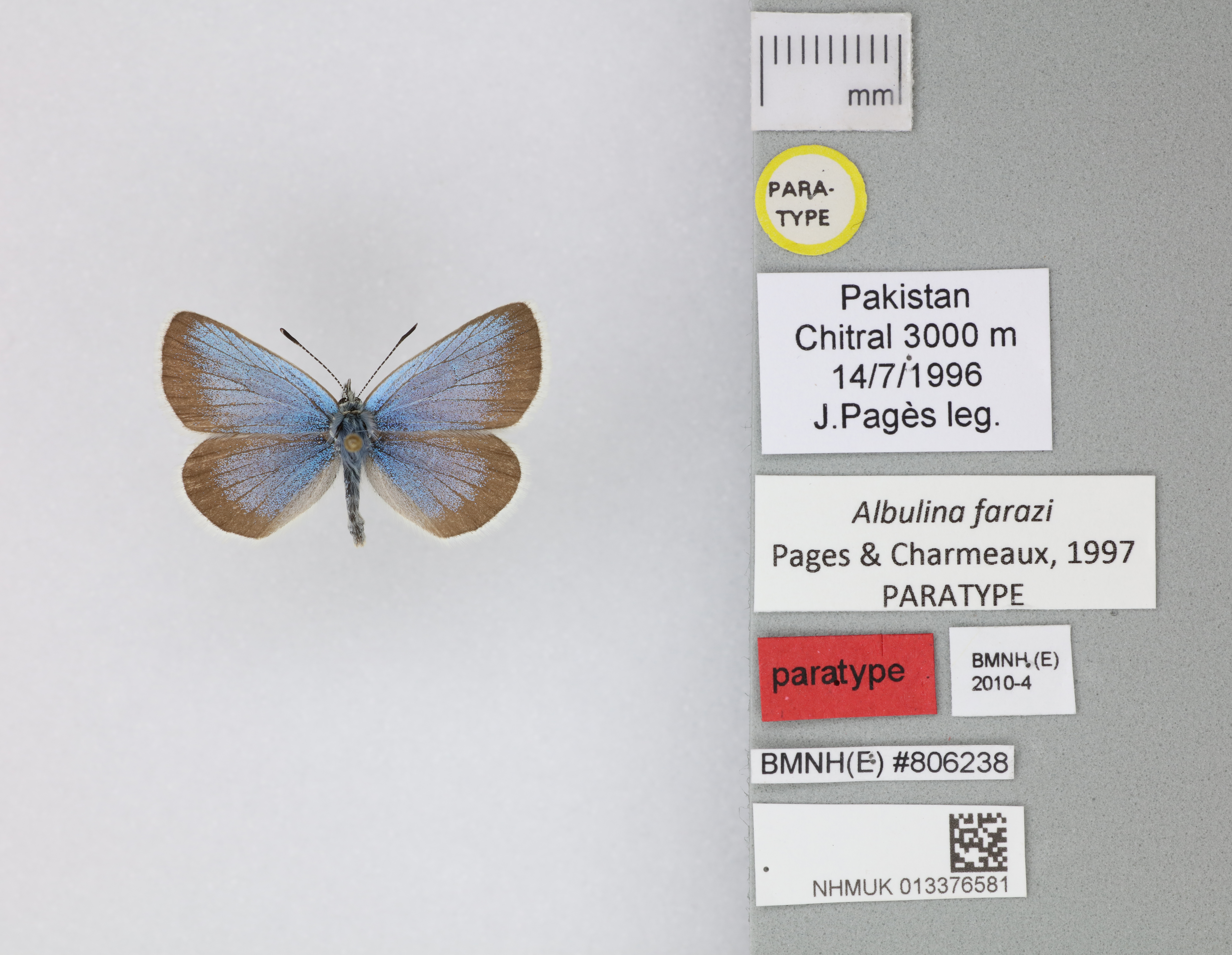
Pamiria farazi Paratype

== Species ==
Listed alphabetically:

- Pamiria chitralensis (Tytler, 1926) Kashmir
- Pamiria chrysopis (Grum-Grshimailo, 1888) Hindu Kush, Pamirs
- Pamiria farazi (Pagès & Charmeux, 1997) Pakistan
- Pamiria galathea (Blanchard, [1844]) Himalaya
- Pamiria issa Zhdanko, 1995 Hindu Kush
- Pamiria margo Zhdanko, 2002
- Pamiria metallica (C. & R. Felder, [1865]) Himalaya
- Pamiria omphisa (Moore, [1875]) Himalaya, North China
- Pamiria selma (Koçak, 1996) Himalaya
