= Sierra Nevada blue =

Sierra Nevada blue may mean:

- Polyommatus golgus, a species of butterfly in the family Lycaenidae, endemic to Spain
- Agriades podarce, also called the arrowhead arctic blue or gray blue, a butterfly in the family Lycaenidae, found in the USA
