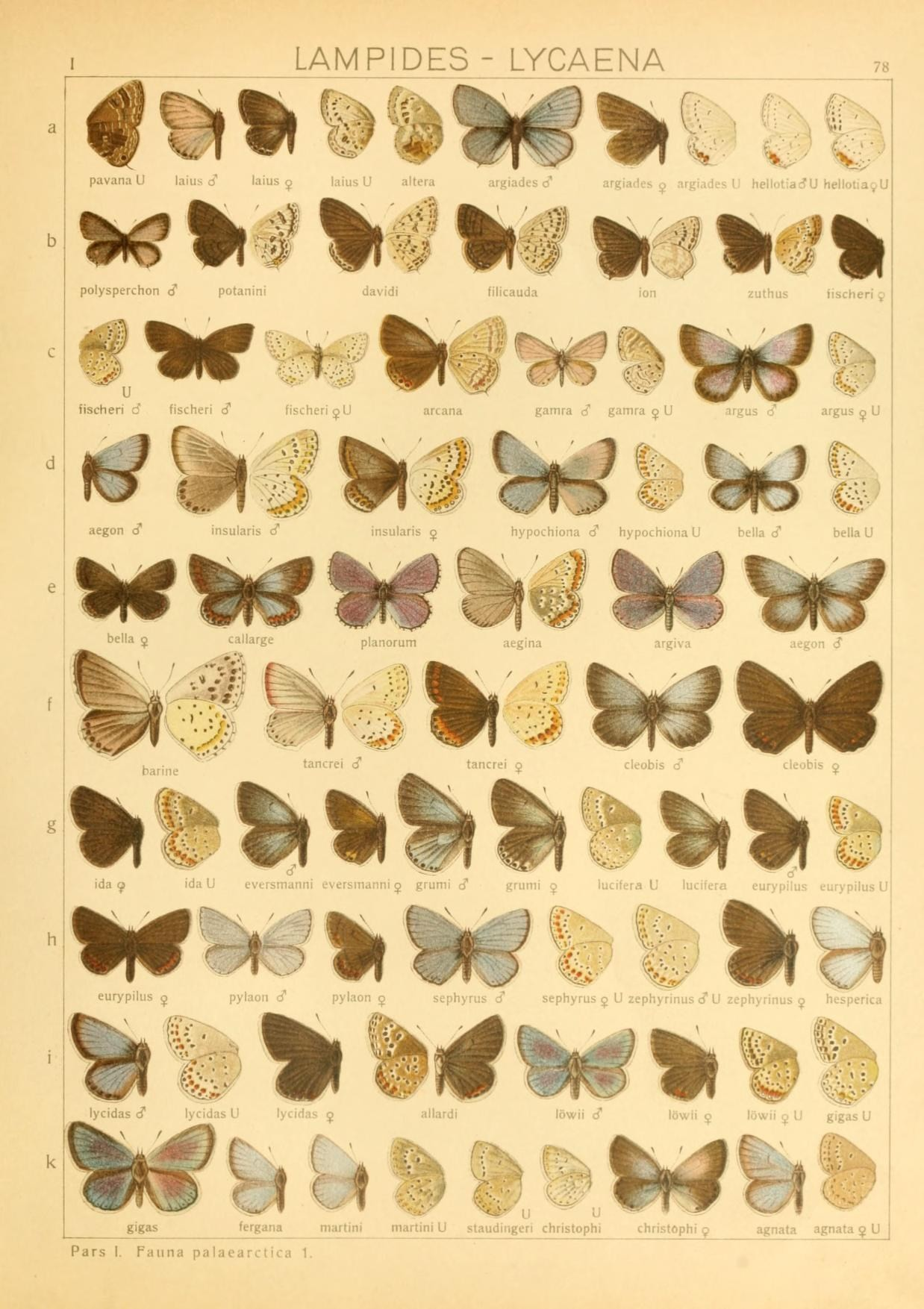
- Patricius lucifer in Seitz 78 g

Scientific classification
- Kingdom: Animalia
- Phylum: Arthropoda
- Clade: Pancrustacea
- Class: Insecta
- Order: Lepidoptera
- Family: Lycaenidae
- Genus: Patricius
- Species: P. lucifer

Binomial name
- Patricius lucifer (Staudinger, 1867)

Synonyms
- Lycaena lucifera Staudinger, 1867; Plebejus lucifera (Staudinger, 1867); Plebejus lucifer (Staudinger, 1867); Patricius lucifer (Staudinger, 1867)

= Patricius lucifera =

Species of butterfly

Patricius lucifera is a butterfly found in the East Palearctic (South Siberia (mountains), Kazakhstan, Mongolia, West China) that belongs to the blues family.

== Taxonomy ==
Patricius lucifera used to be placed in the genus Plebejus as cataloged by Bridges, 1994 (VIII.267), but later revised in Patricius Bálint, 1991 by Talavera et al., 2013

== Description ==
[From Seitz (1909)]: L. lucifera Stgr. (= biton Brem.) (78 g). Above both sexes blackish, the male with the scaling on the disc quite dark blue-green with vivid gloss; the female before the margin of the hindwing with pale ocelli whose centres are formed by the marginal dots. Beneath very uniformly deep dark grey, the ocelli with pale borders, the anal ones with metallic scales. Siberia (Altai), Mongolia and Tibet. — themis Gr.-Grsh.[now full species] is similar to eversmanni, with smaller and paler ocelli on the underside; from the Sinin Mountains.

== See also ==
- List of butterflies of Russia
