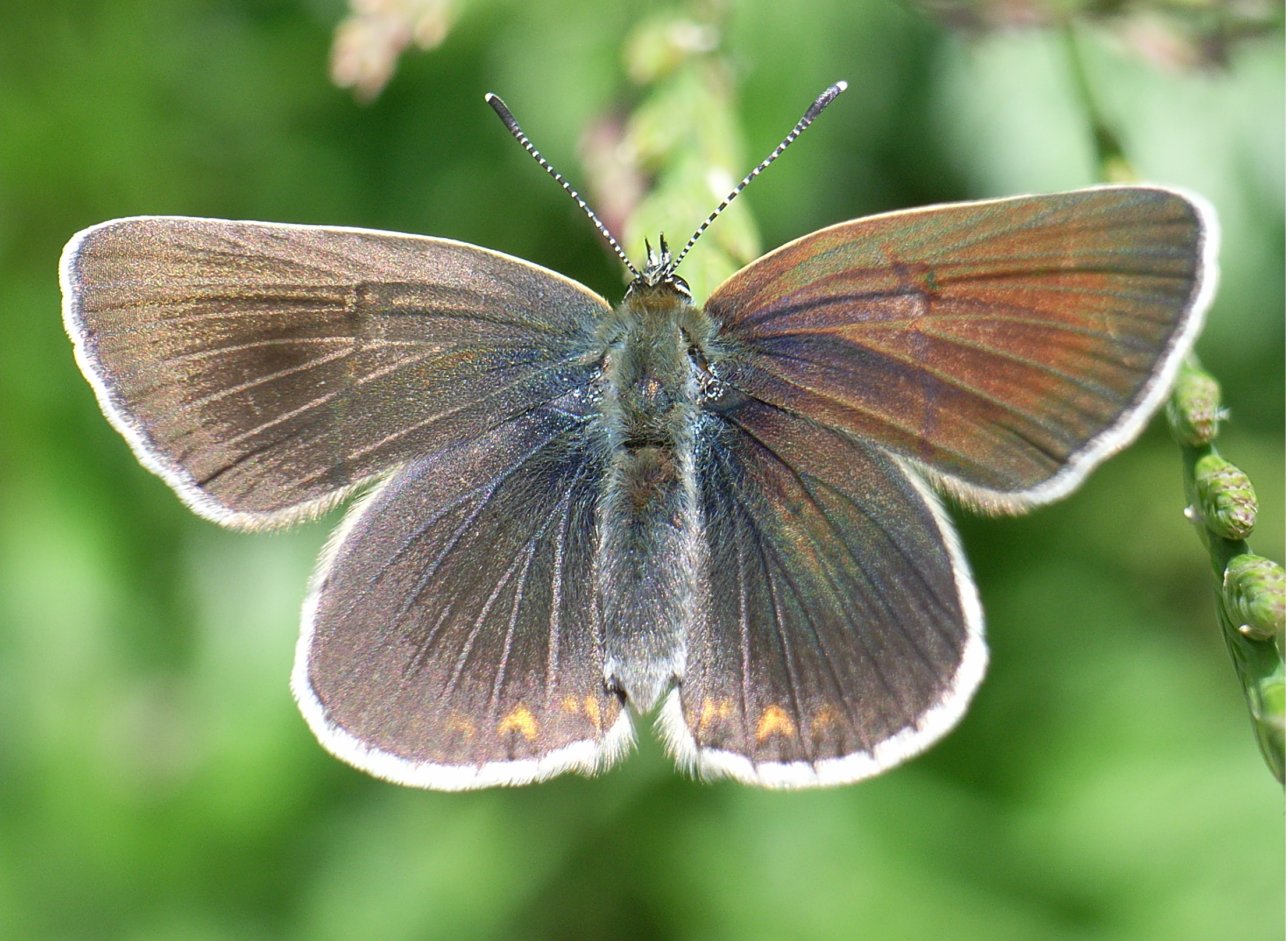

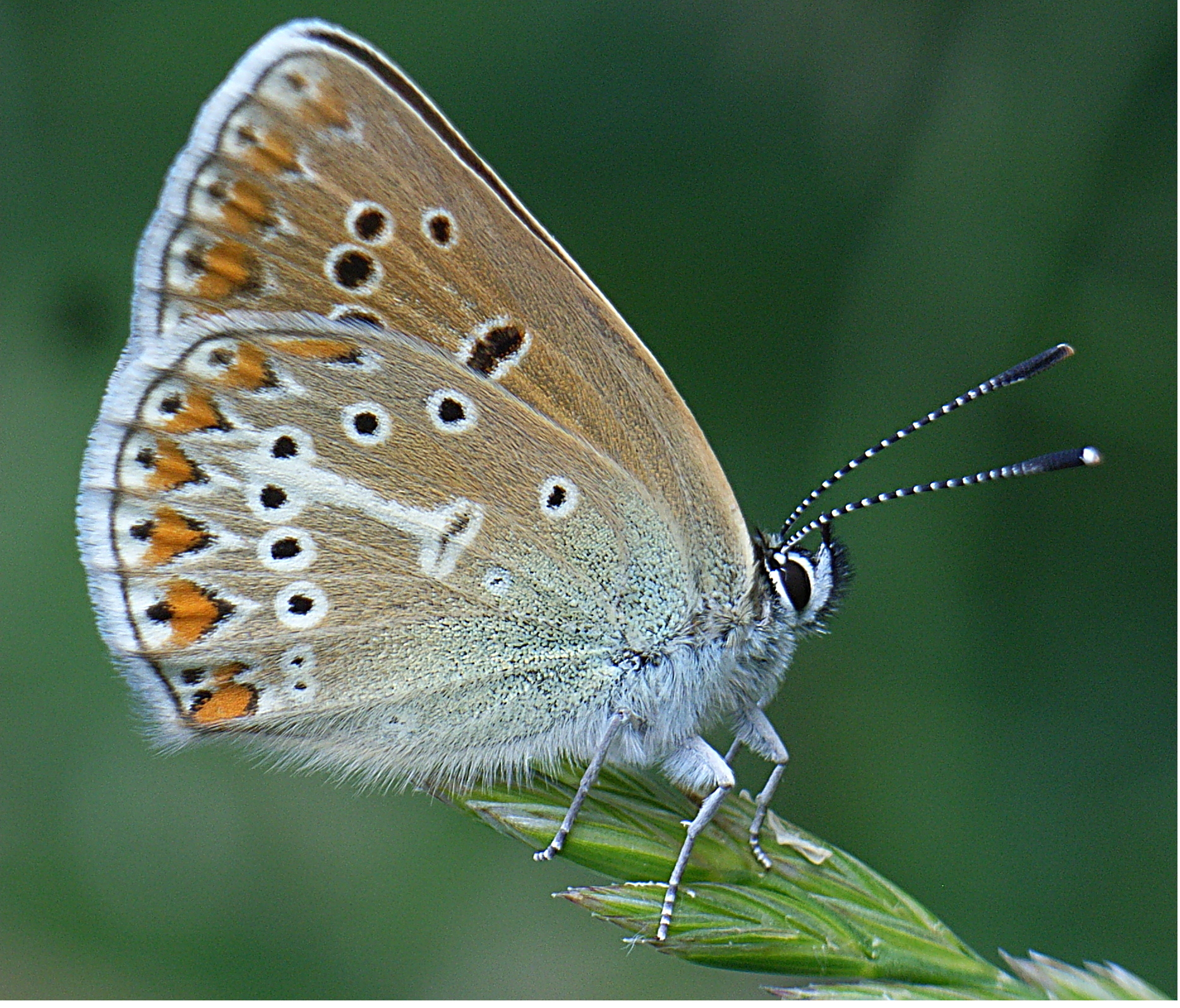

Scientific classification
- Kingdom: Animalia
- Phylum: Arthropoda
- Clade: Pancrustacea
- Class: Insecta
- Order: Lepidoptera
- Family: Lycaenidae
- Genus: Eumedonia
- Species: E. eumedon

Binomial name
- Eumedonia eumedon (Esper, 1780)

Synonyms
- Papilio eumedon Esper, 1780; Aricia eumedon; Plebejus eumedon; Cupido fylgia Spangberg, 1876

= Eumedonia eumedon =

Species of butterfly

Eumedonia eumedon, the geranium argus, is a butterfly of the family Lycaenidae. It is found in the Palearctic realm. This butterfly has been included in the genera Plebejus, Plebeius, Polyommatus and Aricia, but recent molecular studies have demonstrated that Eumedonia is a valid genus, different from the previous genera mentioned.

The wingspan is 26–30 mm. The butterfly flies from May to August depending on the location.

The larvae feed on Geraniaceae species (genera Geranium and Erodium).

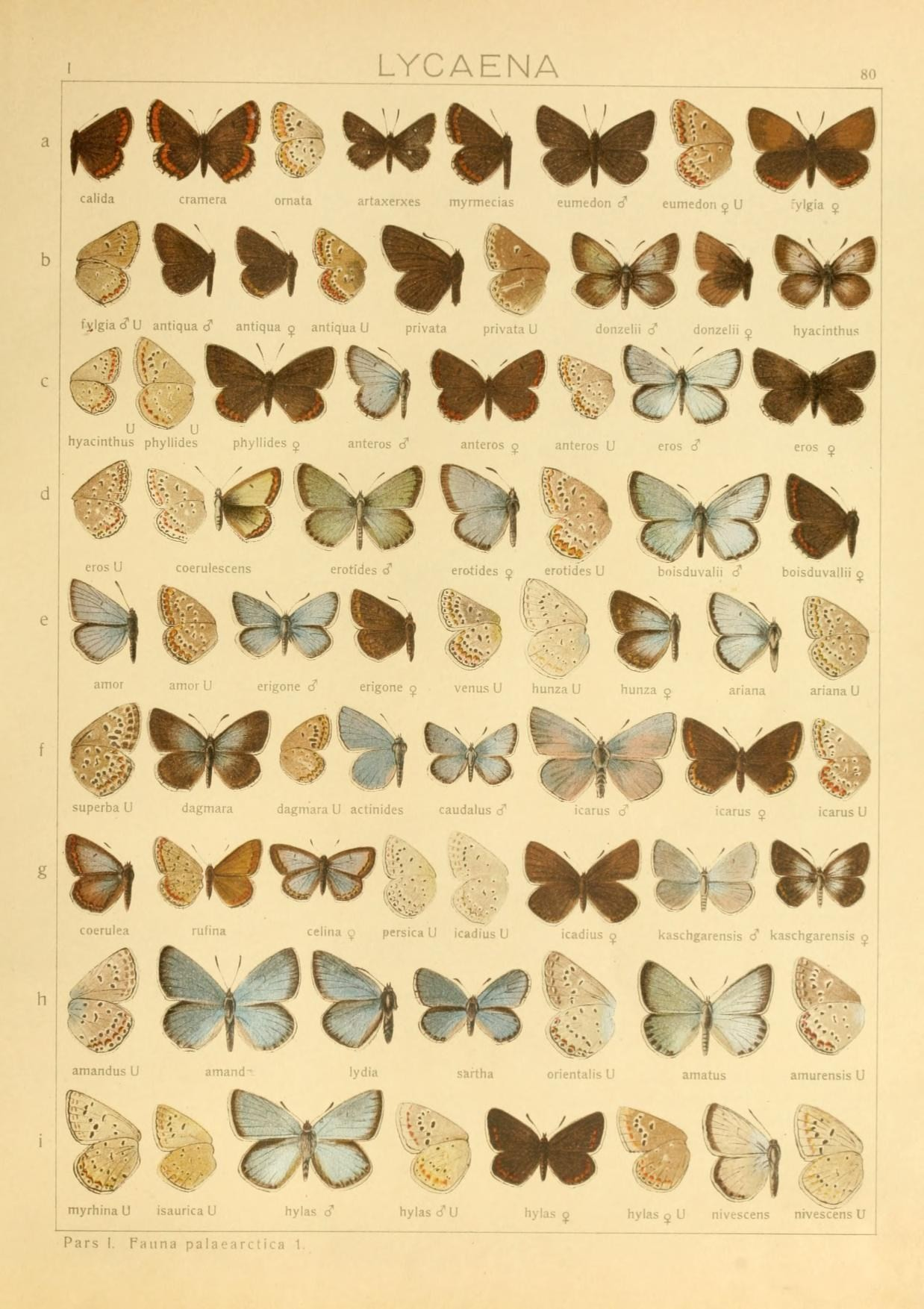
Seitz 80a

== Description from Seitz ==
L. eumedon Esp. (= chiron Rott.) (80 a). Above dark brown with white fringes and dark discocellular spot to the forewing; the female has small red anal submarginal spots on the hindwing, sometimes also on the forewing. Beneath brown, with red-yellow distal band, which is either continuous, or separated into spots, and either restricted to the hindwing or continued on to the forewing, or may be entirely absent; the base of the wings beneath dusted with very glossy metallic scaling; ocelli similarly arranged as in astrarche typical specimens bearing also a distinct white streak from the central spot of hindwing to outer margin. Throughout Europe, but sporadic, usually in places where Geranium grows, distributed from the Pyrenees to the Pacific Ocean and from Scandinavia to Italy, absent from England, — Larva in the pods of Geranium. The butterflies occur from May till July, in the high Alps until August; they fly rather slowly and clumsily, nearly always about the flowers of Geranium, also passing the night asleep in the blossoms of the plants. During flight they move the wings very regularly up and down and often remain fluttering in the air in front of a flower before settling on it. The sexes are of equal frequency and appear to leave but unwillingly their flight-places, where one often meets with pairs in copula. They are found relatively much more rarely at the rills on the roads in the Alps than other, less abundant, species.
