= Plebeius =

Plebeius may refer to:

- The gossamer-winged butterfly genus Plebejus
- A member of the Plebs.
