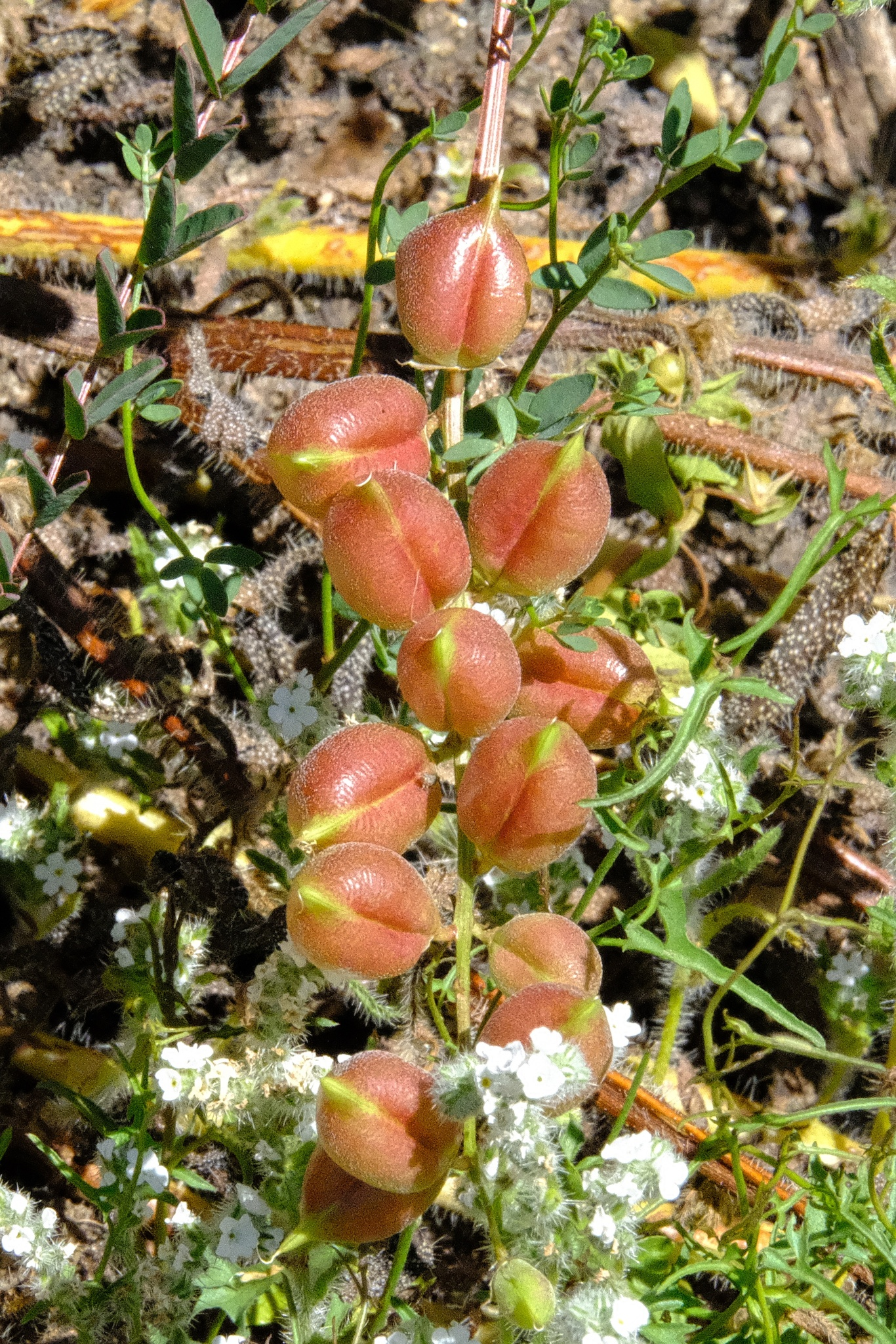

Conservation status
- Critically Imperiled (NatureServe)

Scientific classification
- Kingdom: Plantae
- Clade: Embryophytes
- Clade: Tracheophytes
- Clade: Angiosperms
- Clade: Eudicots
- Clade: Rosids
- Order: Fabales
- Family: Fabaceae
- Subfamily: Faboideae
- Genus: Astragalus
- Species: A. deanei

Binomial name
- Astragalus deanei (Rydb.) Barneby

= Astragalus deanei =

Species of legume

Astragalus deanei is a rare species of milkvetch known by the common name Dean's milkvetch, or Deane's milkvetch. It is endemic to southern San Diego County, California, where it grows on the slopes of the Peninsular Ranges between El Cajon and Tecate.

== Description ==
Astragalus deanei is mostly hairless perennial herb growing erect to heights between 30 and 60 centimeters. The leaves are up to 18 centimeters long and are made up of oval-shaped leaflets with prominent midribs. The whole plant can be 1–2 ft tall.

Dean's milkvetch hosts up to 17 butterflies and moths, some include, the Melissa Blue, the Painted Lady, and other species native to California.

The open inflorescence holds up to 25 whitish flowers, each 1 to 1.5 centimeters long.

The fruit is an inflated legume pod 1.5 to 3 centimeters long which dries to a thin, papery texture. Its single chamber contains many seeds.

Its bloom period is from February–May. It has major toxicity.
