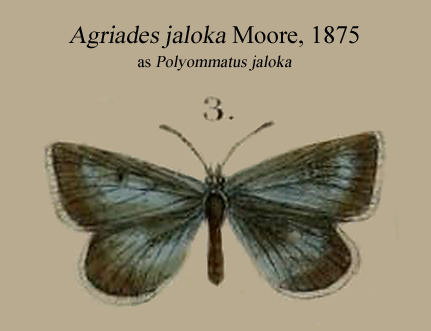
- Male on left, female middle, underside right

Scientific classification
- Kingdom: Animalia
- Phylum: Arthropoda
- Class: Insecta
- Order: Lepidoptera
- Family: Lycaenidae
- Genus: Agriades
- Species: A. jaloka

Binomial name
- Agriades jaloka (Moore, [1875])

= Agriades jaloka =

Jaloka mountain blue

Species of butterfly

Agriades jaloka, the Jaloka mountain blue, is a butterfly in the family Lycaenidae. It is found in Asia.

== Description ==
Race jaloka found in India was earlier called Polyommatus jaloka Moore, [1875]. There is considerable variation in the species.

The male has the upperside brown with metallic green or blue to varying extents from the base outwards. The blue or green usually occupies the basal three-fourths of the wing. Towards the costa there is a broad edge and even broader along the termen of the ground colour. On the hindwing the blue or green occupies a medial area from the base to the disc, and leaves a broad brown edging to the costa, termen and dorsum. Forewings and hindwings have discocellular black spots encircled by pale edgings, followed on both wings by transverse discal series of pale bluish-white spots and anteciliary slender black lines. In some these spots are very prominent, in others barely indicated. On the underside the wings are brownish, turning to greyish white on the termen. Forewing underside has a more or less obscure pale-bordered discocellular spot, followed by a transverse, slightly curved discal series of six black spots encircled with white. The underside of the hindwing has the brown basal area irrorated (sprinkled) inwardly with metallic blue scales and sharply demarcated from the greyish-white terminal area which occupies about half the wing; discocellular spot large and prominently white, as is an angulated transverse discal series of large spots; these latter spots in many specimens somewhat obscure on the greyish-white ground colour of the terminal half of the wing. Cilia of both forewings and hindwings conspicuously white. Antennae, head, thorax and abdomen brown; the shafts of the antennae obscurely ringed with white, the thorax and abdomen with a little bluish pubescence in fresh specimens; beneath: the palpi, thorax and abdomen white.

Female has the upperside brown, without any blue or green irroration. Forewings and hindwings: markings much as in the male, the discal spots always somewhat more prominent. Underside as in the male; the discal spots generally more prominent and followed in some specimens by two or three posterior, large, diffuse brown markings. Antennae, head, thorax and abdomen similar to those of the male, but the latter two without any blue pubescence; beneath as in the male.

Has a wingspan of 28–30 mm.

The species is found in the north-western Himalayas, Kashmir, Pangi and Ladakh.

Variety ellisi Marshall, differs from typical jaloka as follows: Upperside of the male has the suffusion of metallic bluish-green scales restricted to the immediate base of the forewing, extended slightly more outwards on the hindwing, but never so far towards the termen as in jaloka in both sexes the discal series of spots on both forewings and hindwings very large and clearly defined, the discocellular spot prominently white, very rarely centred with dark brown. Underside creamy white, slightly brownish on the discal areas of both forewings and hindwings, while the discal spots on both wings are entirely white, with no trace of dark centres, as on the forewing of the typical race. Otherwise as in jaloka.

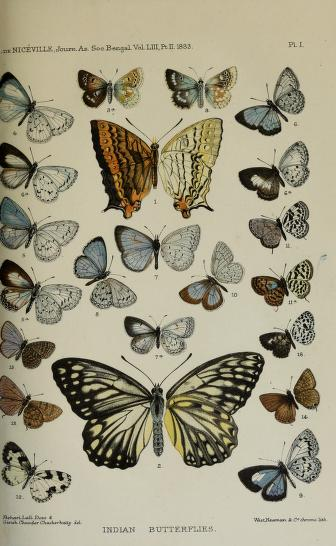
Var. leela figures 3 and 3a, plate accompanying de Nicéville's description in the Journal of the Asiatic Society of Bengal

Var. leela de Nicéville, differs from typical jaloka as follows: The irroration of metallic bluish-green scales on the upperside of the wings extended outwards from the base almost but not quite so far as in jaloka; the spots of the transverse discal series on both forewings and hindwings as in jaloka but each obscurely centred with blackish in most specimens. Underside: greyish white, discs of wings brown, bases irrorated somewhat densely with metallic green scales, paler than in the typical race. Forewing with a very indistinct irregular subterminal series of dark spots in addition to the disco-cellular and discal spots, which are similar to those in jaloka. Hindwing, according to de Niceville has, in addition to the discocellular and discal markings, "a marginal double series of coalescing white lunules."

== See also ==
- List of butterflies of India (Lycaenidae)
