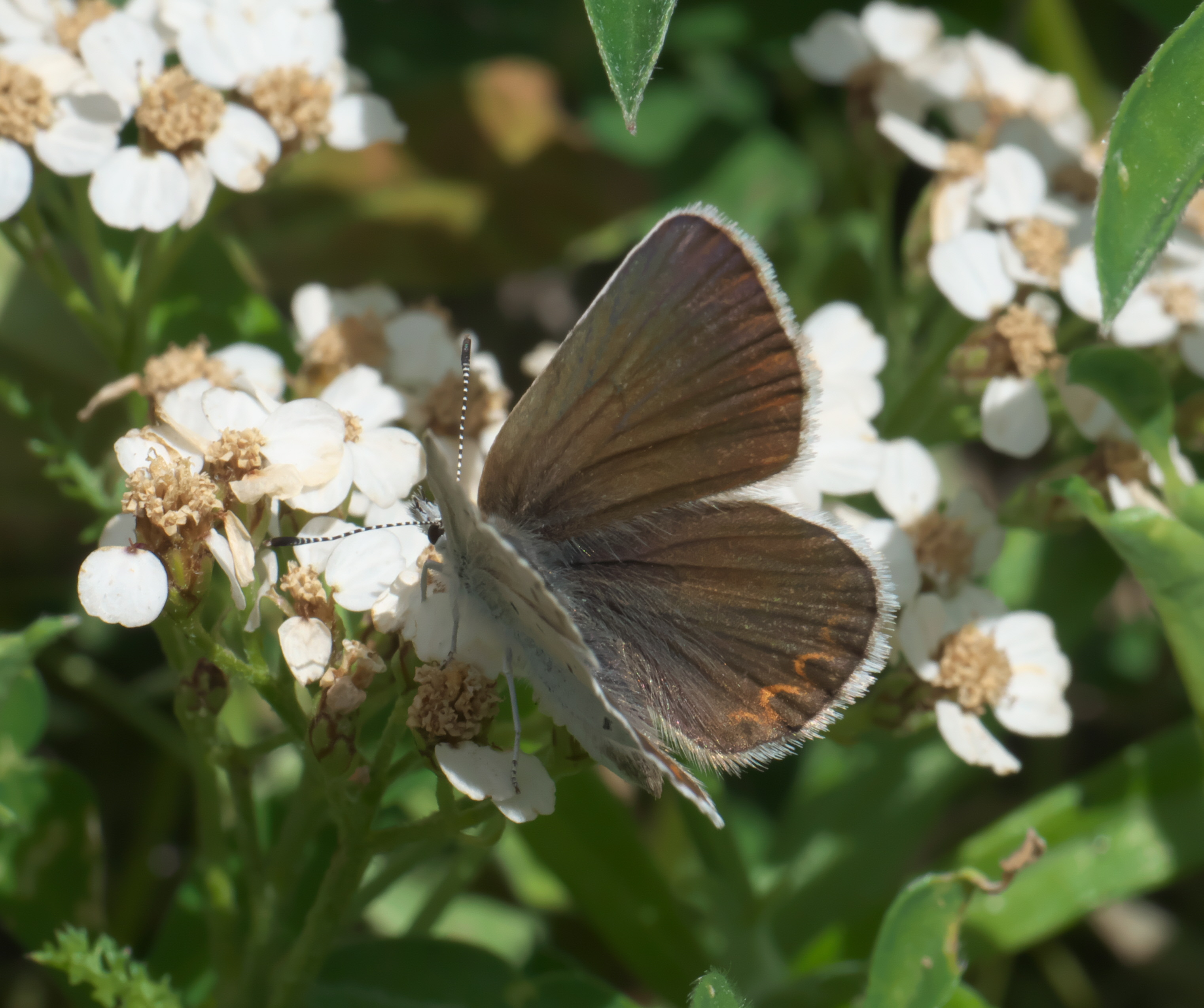

Scientific classification
- Kingdom: Animalia
- Phylum: Arthropoda
- Class: Insecta
- Order: Lepidoptera
- Family: Lycaenidae
- Genus: Plebejus
- Species: P. anna

Binomial name
- Plebejus anna (W H Edwards, 1861)

= Plebejus anna =

Species of butterfly

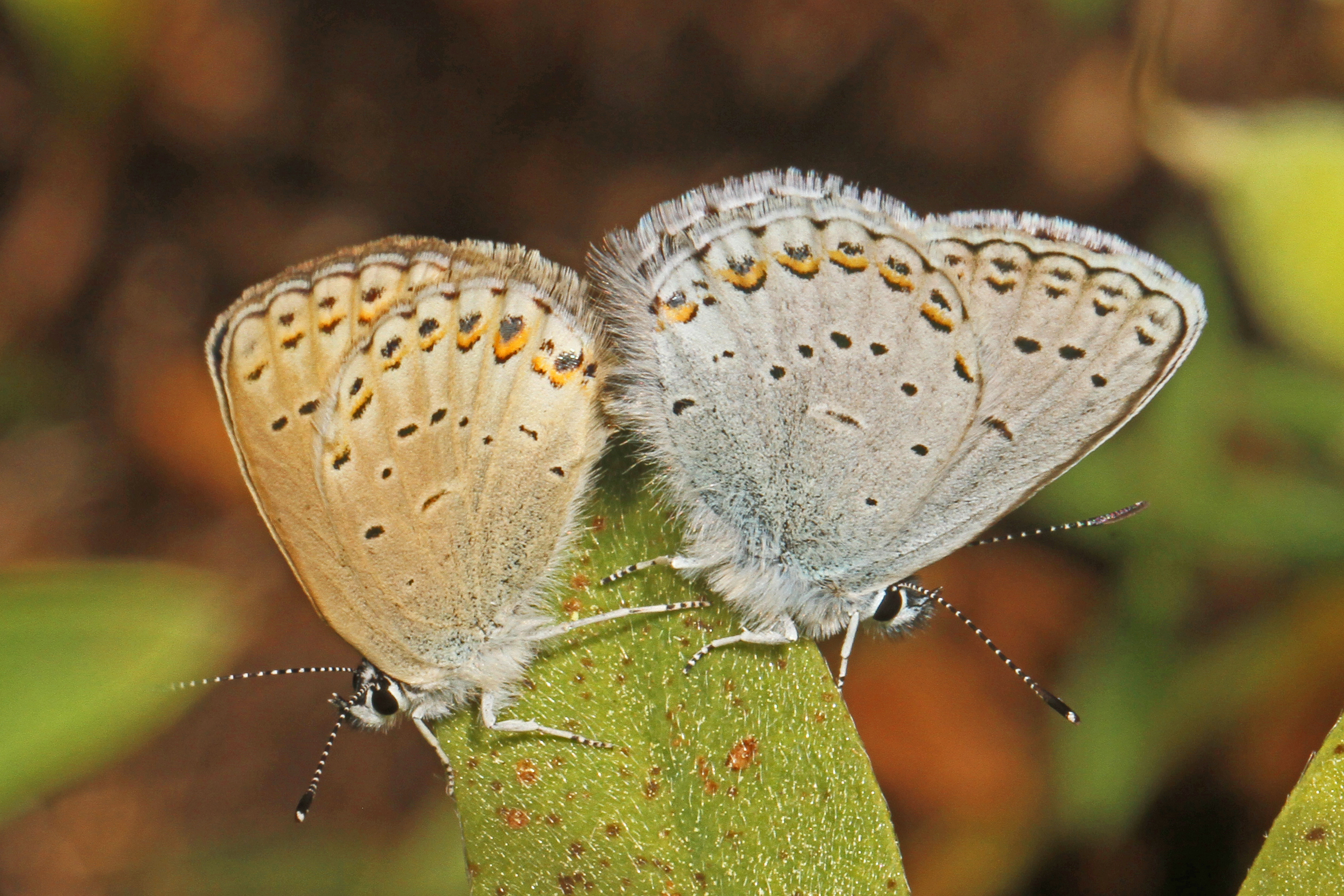
Male Anna's Blue

Plebejus anna, or Anna's blue, is a species of blue in the butterfly family Lycaenidae. It is found in North America.

Once considered as one species with the Northern Blue(Plejebus idas), they are now recognised as a distinct species. The Anna's blue can be very similar to the Melissa Blue in appearance. For the males they may be more bluish white and white outlines around the wings. As for the females they are slightly varied such as having brown wings with orange submarginal bands which are often less developed than those that can be found on the Melissa Blue(Plejebus idas) and sometimes can be completely absent, and whitish outline on the wings. The Anna's normally takes fight during the summer (1 Brood).

Larval food plant: Blueberry and other heaths, and legumes.

The MONA or Hodges number for Plebejus anna is 4374.1.

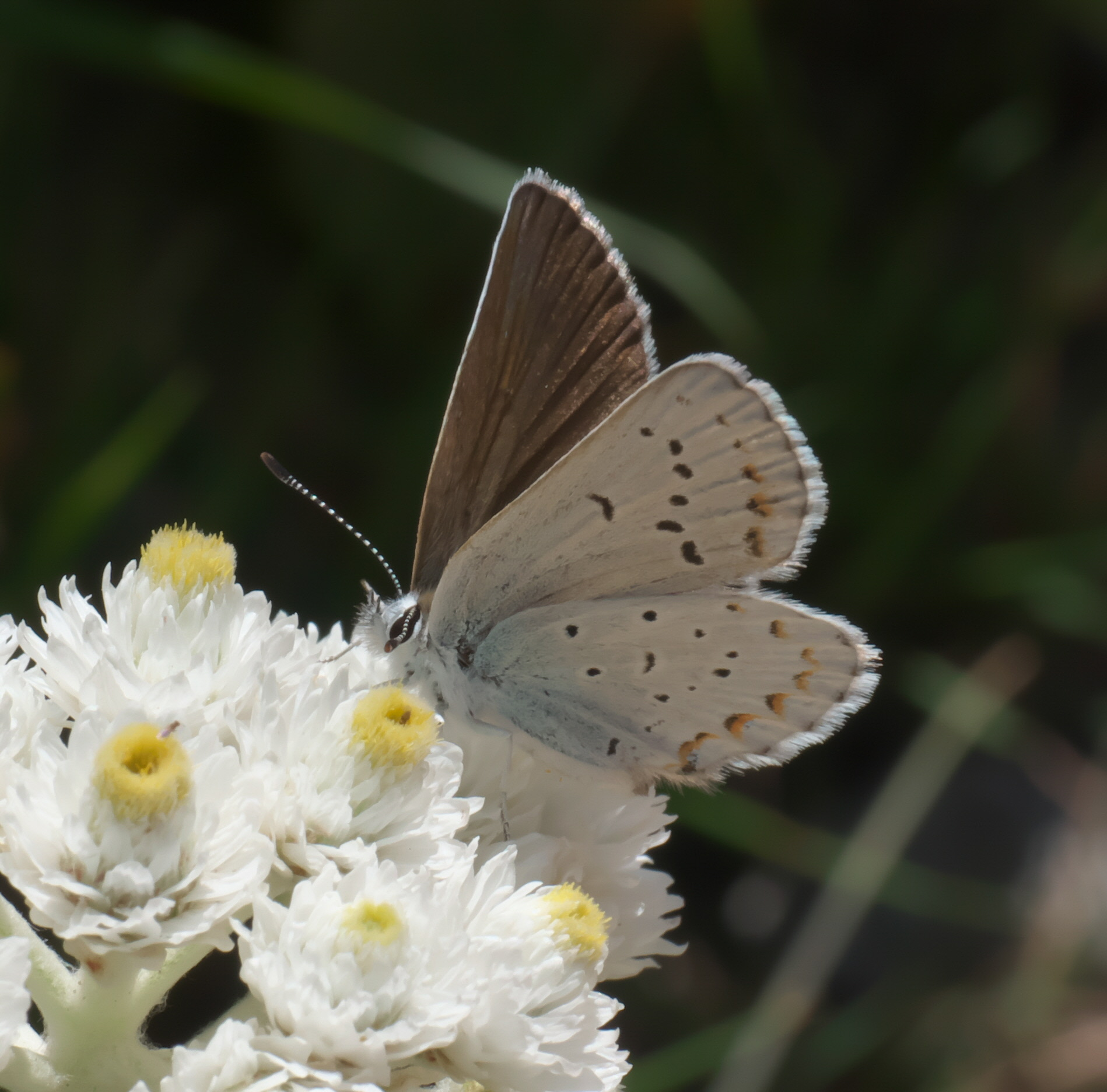
Anna's blue, Plebejus anna

== Subspecies ==
These six subspecies belong to the species Plebejus anna:

- Plebejus anna anna (W. H. Edwards, 1861)
- Plebejus anna azureus (J. Emmel, T. Emmel & Mattoon in T. Emmel, 1998)
- Plebejus anna benwarner Scott, 2006
- Plebejus anna lotis (Lintner, 1878)
- Plebejus anna ricei Cross, 1937
- Plebejus anna vancouverensis (C. Guppy & J. Shepard, 2001)
