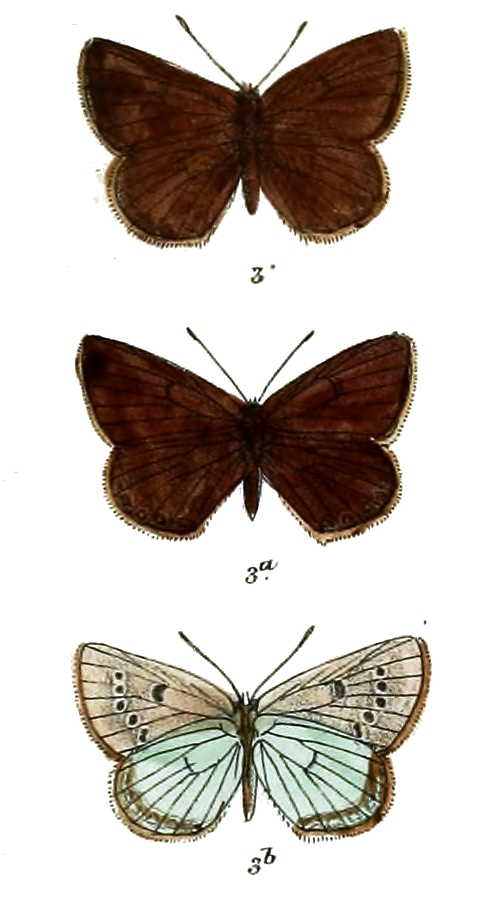

Scientific classification
- Domain: Eukaryota
- Kingdom: Animalia
- Phylum: Arthropoda
- Class: Insecta
- Order: Lepidoptera
- Family: Lycaenidae
- Genus: Patricius
- Species: P. younghusbandi

Binomial name
- Patricius younghusbandi (Elwes, 1906)

Synonyms
- Lycaena younghusbandi Elwes, 1906; Albulina younghusbandi (Elwes, 1906)

= Patricius younghusbandi =

Species of butterfly

Patricius younghusbandi is a species of lycaenid butterfly found in Asia.

== Description ==
Male upperside: dark satiny brown with a slightly plumbeous tint in certain lights, more apparent towards the bases of the wings than over the outer portions. Forewings and hindwings: nearly uniform, with only slender black anteciliary lines and the discocellulars of the forewing marked by a transverse short black streak; edge of the costa of forewing and cilia of both wings snow-white. Underside forewing: grey; a lunular short black line on the discocellulars and a transverse discal series of six black spots, each encircled with white, followed by a subterminal, very obscure, transverse row of slender dusky spots, of which the anterior spots are barely indicated, the posterior three or four obsolescent but traceable. Hindwing: pale metallic green; a broad terminal edging grey; the ground colour bounded outwardly by an obscure series of dusky spots that are suffused with metallic green. Antennae, head, thorax and abdomen dark brown, shafts of the antennae ringed with white; beneath: palpi, thorax and abdomen white.

This form, collected by Capt. Walton, I.M.S., during the late Tibet Expedition, is very close to, even if it can be considered at all distinct from L. felicis, Oberthur, which was also abundant at Gyantze. I have been quite unable to identify and separate the female from the females of felicis. The chief points of difference in the male are "the dark leaden grey instead of greyish-brown colour above" and the obsolescence of the terminal markings.
