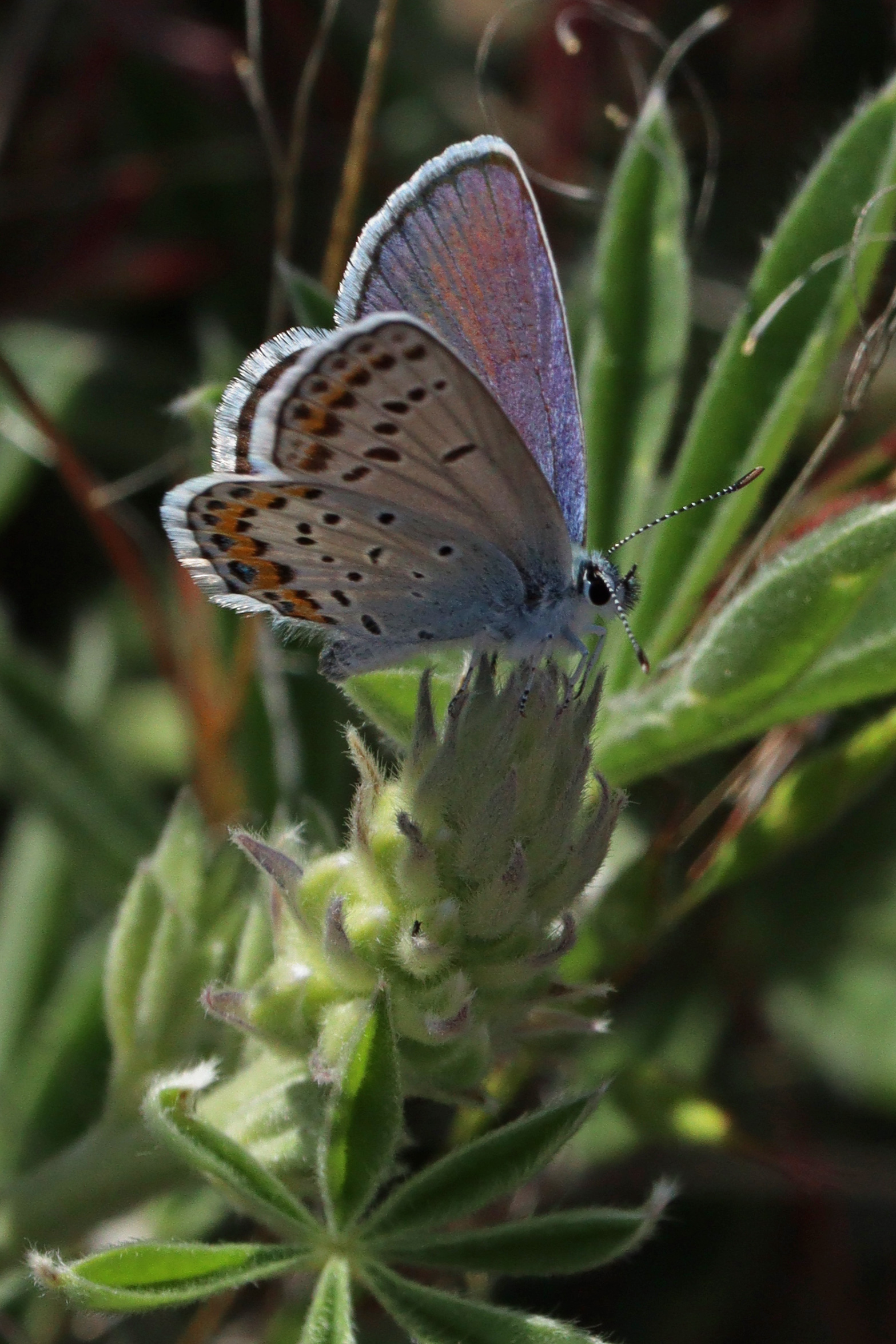

Conservation status
- Apparently Secure (NatureServe)

Scientific classification
- Kingdom: Animalia
- Phylum: Arthropoda
- Class: Insecta
- Order: Lepidoptera
- Family: Lycaenidae
- Genus: Plebejus
- Species: P. melissa

Binomial name
- Plebejus melissa W.H. Edwards, 1873

= Melissa blue =

Species of butterfly

The Melissa blue (Plebejus melissa) is a butterfly of the family Lycaenidae. It is found in western North America, from Canada to Mexico.

== Taxonomy ==
The Karner blue (Plebejus samuelis) was traditionally considered a subspecies of the Melissa blue, and was described by the novelist/lepidopterist Vladimir Nabokov.

== Description ==
The wingspan is 22–35 mm. Below, the hindwing orange submarginal band, often with distal iridescent blue points, help to distinguish this species from the more muted colors and markings of the similar Plebejus idas. The marginal line is wider where the veins intersect. The fringes are not checked.

== Behavior and diet ==
The butterfly flies from April to August depending on the location. The larvae feed on Lupinus, Medicago and Lotus species.
