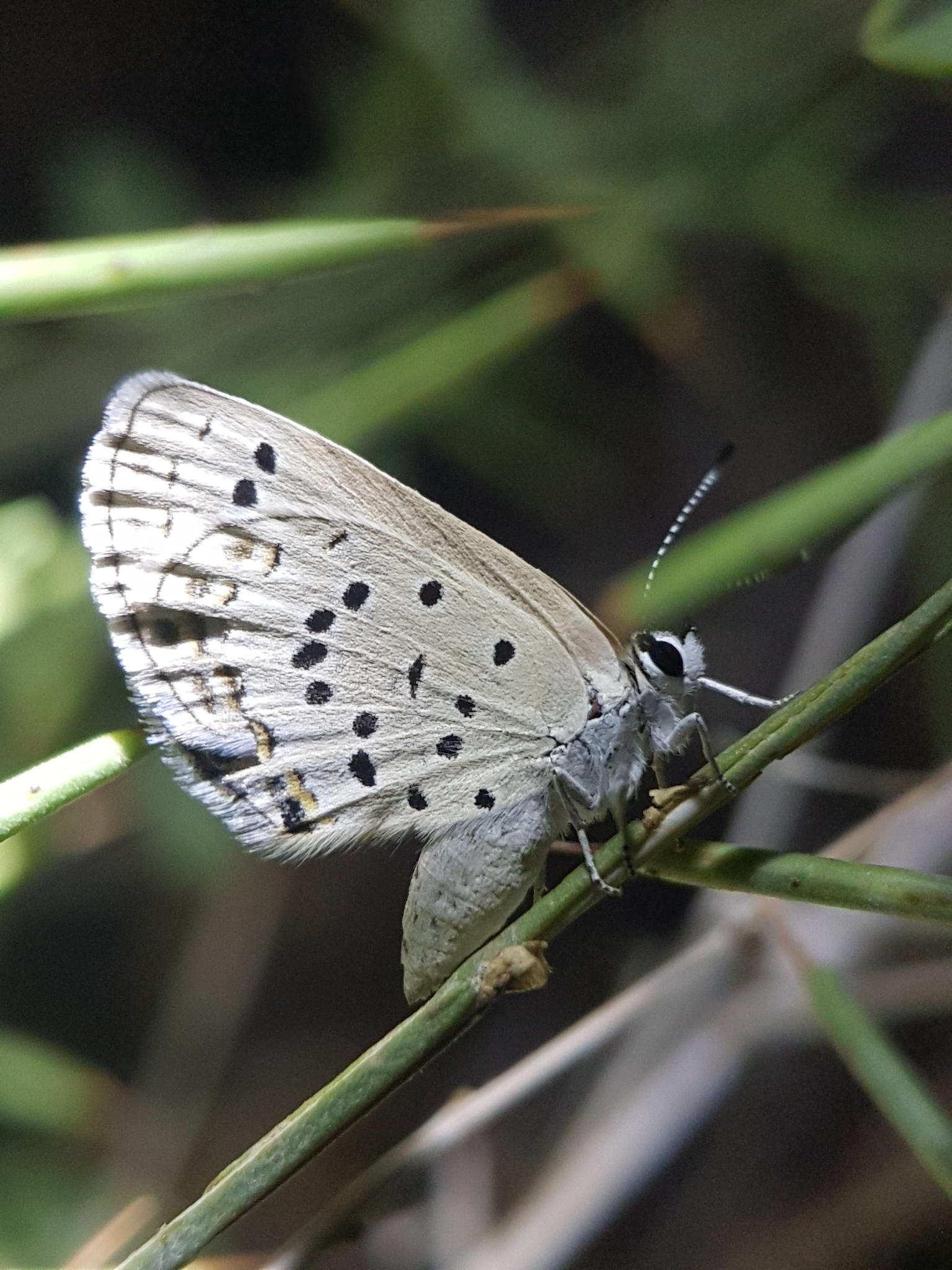

Scientific classification
- Kingdom: Animalia
- Phylum: Arthropoda
- Clade: Pancrustacea
- Class: Insecta
- Order: Lepidoptera
- Family: Lycaenidae
- Tribe: Polyommatini
- Genus: Plebejus; Kluk, 1780
- Species: P. christophi

Binomial name
- Plebejus christophi (Staudinger 1874)

= Plebejus christophi =

Small jewel blue

Species of butterfly

Plebejus christophi, the small jewel blue, is a small butterfly found in Asia that belongs to the lycaenids or blues family.

== Description ==
The small jewel blue is 28–35 mm in size. The male butterfly is rather dull violet blue above with narrow borders. The female is brown above and has blue-scaled bases. On the underside of both sexes, the hindwing sport small metallic spots along the entire margin but without prominent red marginal spots. The marginal spots on the margins of both the forewings and hindwings are faintly orange crowned. The discal spots on the hindwing are small or minute while those on the forewing may be large and prominent.

=== Description ===
Charles Thomas Bingham described race samudra, Moore: Male upperside: pale lavender blue. Forewings and hindwings: termen somewhat broadly and diffusely fuscous black; costal margin and apex of hindwing more broadly so; in fresh specimens the bluish scaling on the hindwing posteriorly is carried nearly to the terminal margin, this gives the wing an appearance of a posterior terminal series of three or four large fuscous black spots, one in each interspace; cilia white. Underside: pale grey. Forewing with the usual transverse discocellular and discal series of six white-encircled black spots, no spot in the cell or in interspace 1; the discal row of spots regular (not sinuate), slightly curved, very obliquely placed, sloping posteriorly inwards, the four posterior spots in the series large and posited en echelon; these are followed by a double subterminal series of dusky lunules and a slender anteciliary black line; the series of lunules become in many specimens obsolescent anteriorly. Hindwing: the markings much as in the female of L. balucha, but the discal series of spots is placed further inwards, the spots of the subterminal row are speckled with minute metallic green scales, and the ochraceous edging to the transverse series of black lunules is wanting.

Female upperside brown, the bases of the wings irrorated with bluish-grey scales, the irroration extended irregularly along the dorsal margin of the hindwing. Cilia of forewings and hindwings conspicuously white. Underside; ground colour as in the male; markings slightly larger, more clearly defined. Forewing: the transverse discal series of spots insinuate, the posterior three spots of the series distinctly larger than the others, the middle spot of these three shifted inwards; the terminal markings consist of a transverse postdiscal series of black lunules edged outwardly with bright ochraceous, followed by a transverse series of black spots and an anteciliary black line, all very clearly defined. Hindwing: markings very similar to those of the male but the discal series of spots is closer to the base of the wing and the postdiscal transverse row of black lunules is prominently edged outwardly with ochraceous. In both sexes the antennae are black, the shafts ringed as usual with white; the head, thorax and abdomen are dark brown or black with a more or less dense clothing of purplish-blue hairs and scales; beneath: the palpi, thorax and abdomen white.

== Taxonomy ==
The butterfly was earlier known as Polyommatus christophi (Staudinger).

== Range ==
- As per Evans, it ranges along the Himalayas from Baluchistan in Pakistan to Kashmir and Ladakh in India.
- Wynter-Blyth records the butterfly as not rare and ranging from Baluchistan, Chitral, Ladakh and Kashmir.
- As per Savela, the butterfly ranges from northern Iran, Caucasus, Kurdistan, Turkestan, Chitral, northern Afghanistan, Turan, southern Ghissar, southern Armenia, Turkey and Gansu.

== See also ==
- List of butterflies of India (Lycaenidae)
