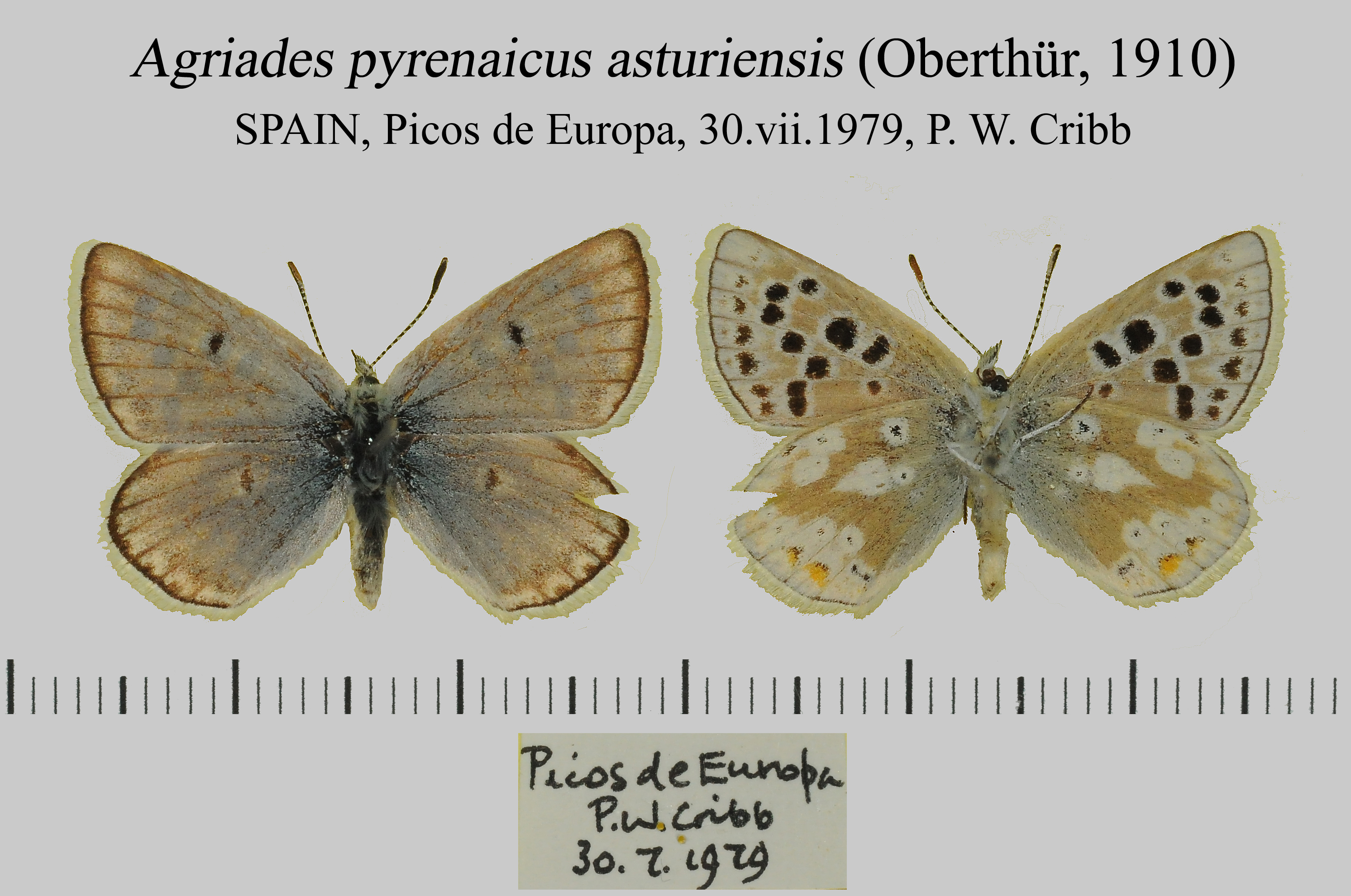
- A. p. asturiensis
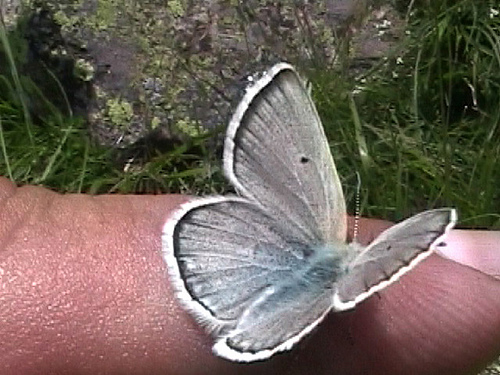

Conservation status
- Least Concern (IUCN 3.1)

Scientific classification
- Kingdom: Animalia
- Phylum: Arthropoda
- Class: Insecta
- Order: Lepidoptera
- Family: Lycaenidae
- Genus: Agriades
- Species: A. pyrenaicus

Binomial name
- Agriades pyrenaicus (Boisduval, 1840)

Synonyms
- Lycaena orbitulus pyrenaica Boisduval, 1840; Lycaena pyrenaica asturiensis Oberthür, 1910; Agriades ergane Higgins, 1981; Lycaena dardanus Freyer, 1844; Lycaena araraticus Gerhard, 1853; Lycaena rebeli Tuleschkow, 1932; Lycaena latedisjuncta Alberti, 1973; Agriades hesselbarthi Nekrutenko, 1974; Agriades erzurumensis Eckweiler & Hesselbarth, 1978; Agriades kudrnai Koçak, 1980

= Agriades pyrenaicus =

Gavarnie blue

Species of butterfly

Agriades pyrenaicus, the Gavarnie blue, is a Palearctic butterfly of the family Lycaenidae. It is found in the Asturias Mountains of north-western Spain, the Pyrenees, the southern Balkan Peninsula, Turkey, the Caucasus and Armenia. The habitat consists of alpine grassy rocky meadows where it is found at altitudes ranging from 1,500 to 2,200 meters.

The wingspan is 22–28 mm. The wings are grey suffused with blue and the wings are bordered by a white line. On the upperside a grey discal spot centers each wing, on the underside the forewings are decorated with black dots circled in white and the hindwings have a sub-marginal line of white dots some centered yellow.

The larvae feed on Androsace species.

== Subspecies ==
- A. p. pyrenaicus (central Pyrenees)
- A. p. asturiensis (Oberthür, 1910) (Picos de Europa)
- A. p. dardanus (Freyer, 1844) - Balkan blue (Balkans, Asia Minor, Caucasus, Armenia) smaller than pyrenaicus, and the pale spots of the hindwing beneath with more distinct black centres.
- A. p. ergane (Higgins, 1981) (Ukraine, Russia)
