= Agriades pheretiades =

Scientific classification
- Kingdom: Animalia
- Phylum: Arthropoda
- Clade: Pancrustacea
- Class: Insecta
- Order: Lepidoptera
- Family: Lycaenidae
- Genus: Agriades
- Species: A. pheretiades

Binomial name
- Agriades pheretiades (Eversmann, 1843)

Synonyms
- Lycaena pheretiades Eversmann, 1843; Lycaena pheretiades var. dschagataicus Bang-Haas, 1915; Lycaena pheretiades philebus Fruhstorfer, 1915; Lycaena pheretiades pheres Staudinger, 1886; Lycaena pheretiades var. pheretulus Staudinger, 1886; Lycaena pherecydes Grum-Grshimailo, 1890; Lycaena pheretiades phereclus Grum-Grshimailo, 1890; Lycaena pheretiades var. micra Avinoff, 1910; Lycaena andarabi Forster, 1937; Lycaena orbitulus walli Evans, 1912; Lycaena pheretiades var. tekessana Alphéraky, 1897

Species of butterfly

Agriades pheretiades, the Tien Shan blue, is a Palearctic butterfly of the family Lycaenidae.

== Subspecies ==
- A. p. pheretiades (Saur Mountains, Tarbagatai Mountains, Dzhungarsky Alatau)
- A. p. andarabi (Forster, 1937) (western Pamirs)
- A. p. danya Korb, 2013 (Uzbekistan)
- A. p. lara Zhdanko & Churkin, 2001 (Kyrgyzstan)
- A. p. micrus (Avinoff, 1910) (eastern Pamirs)
- A. p. pheres (Staudinger, 1886) (Gissar Range, Darvaz, Alay Mountains, northern and western Tian Shan)
- A. p. pheretulus (Staudinger, 1886)
- A. p. pseudomicrus Tshikolovets, 1997 (northern Pamirs)
- A. p. sveta Zhdanko & Churkin, 2001 (Kazakhstan)
- A. p. tekessanus (Alphéraky, 1897) (inner Tian Shan)
- A. p. walli (Evans, 1912) (Kashmir)
