= Agriades asiatica =

Azure mountain blue

Scientific classification
- Domain: Eukaryota
- Kingdom: Animalia
- Phylum: Arthropoda
- Class: Insecta
- Order: Lepidoptera
- Family: Lycaenidae
- Genus: Agriades
- Species: A. asiatica

Binomial name
- Agriades asiatica (Elwes, 1882)

Synonyms
- Lycaena pheretes var. asiatica Elwes, 1882; Lycaena asiatica; Albulina asiatica

Species of butterfly

Agriades asiatica, the azure mountain blue, is a small butterfly found in the Himalayas that belongs to the lycaenids or blues family.

== Taxonomy ==
The butterfly was earlier known as Polyommatus asiatica or as Albulina asiatica.

== Range ==
The butterfly occurs in the Himalayas (Sikkim) and the Central Asian mountains.
