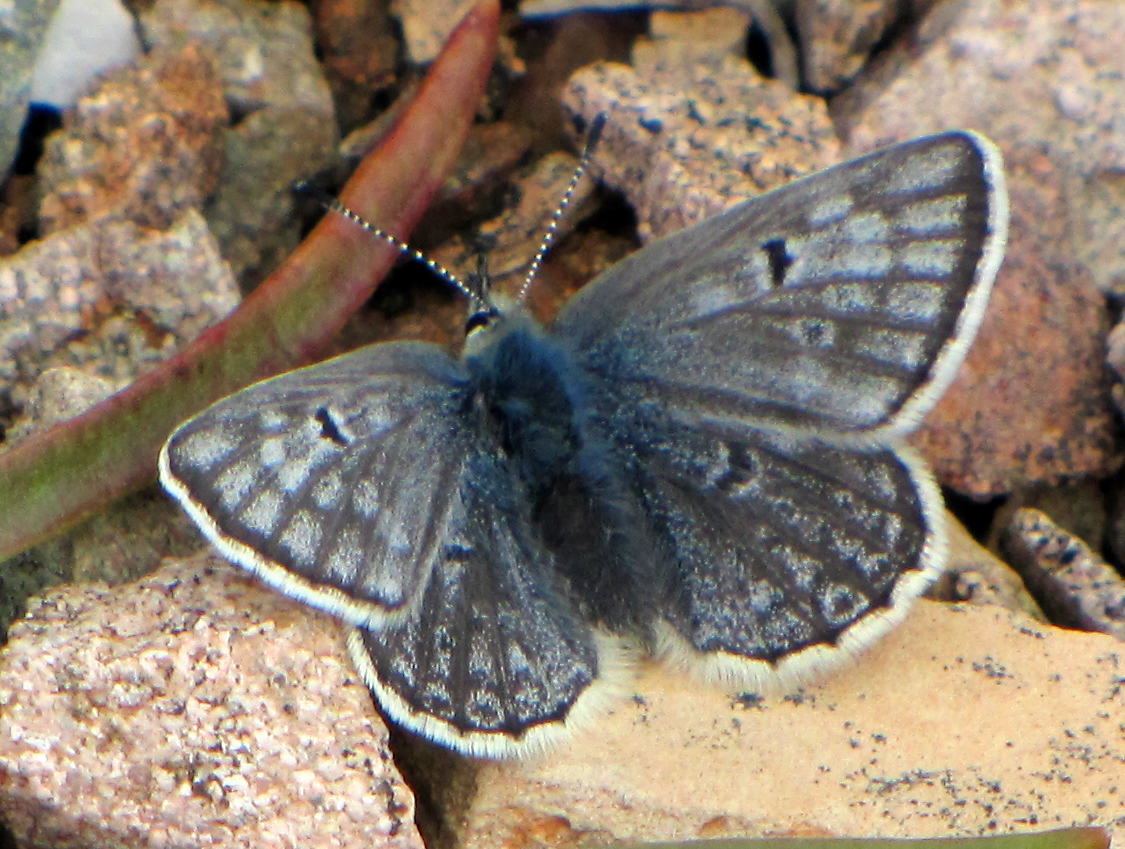
- Arctic blue (Agriades glandon)

Scientific classification
- Kingdom: Animalia
- Phylum: Arthropoda
- Class: Insecta
- Order: Lepidoptera
- Family: Lycaenidae
- Subfamily: Polyommatinae
- Tribe: Polyommatini
- Genus: Agriades; Hübner, [1819]

Synonyms
- Albulina Tutt, 1909; Vacciniina Tutt, 1909; Latiorina Tutt, 1909; Xinjiangia Huang & Murayama, 1988; Himalaya Koçak & Seven, 1998; Mestore Koçak & Kemal, 2007

= Agriades =

Genus of butterflies

Agriades is a genus of butterflies in the family Lycaenidae. Its species are found in temperate Asia, Europe, and North America.

== Taxonomy ==
As a result of studies of molecular phylogenetics, Agriades has been enlarged to include some of the species that used to be placed in Albulina (see the orbitulus species-group below) and in Vacciniina (see the optilete species-group).

In some earlier classifications, these three genera used to be included in Plebejus.

== Species ==
Listed alphabetically within groups:

The aquilo species-group:

- Agriades diodorus (Bremer, 1861) Mongolia, North China, South Siberia
- Agriades glandon (de Prunner, 1798) – Glandon blue or Arctic blue (including Agriades aquilo, Agriades cassiope, and Agriades franklinii)
- Agriades podarce (C. & R. Felder, [1865])

The ellisi species-group:

- Agriades ellisi (Marshall, 1882) Himalaya
- Agriades errans (Riley, 1927) Himalaya
- Agriades jaloka Moore, [1875]) Himalaya, Baltistan, Kashmir
- Agriades janigena (Riley, 1923) Tibet
- Agriades kurtjohnsoni Bálint, 1997 Himalaya
- Agriades morsheadi (Evans, 1923) Tibet

The pyrenaica species-group:

- Agriades aegagrus (Christoph, 1873) North Iran
- Agriades dardanus (Freyer, 1845) – often included in Agriades pyrenaica
- Agriades forsteri Sakai, 1978 Central Asia
- Agriades pheretiades (Eversmann, 1843)
- Agriades pyrenaica (Boisduval, 1840) – Gavarnie blue
- Agriades zullichi Hemming, 1933

The sikkima species-group:

- Agriades dis (Grum-Grshimailo, 1891) Central Asia, Himalaya
- Agriades luana (Evans, 1915) Tibet
- Agriades sikkima (Harcourt-Bath, 1900) Himalaya

Ungrouped:

- Agriades kumukuleensis (Huang & Murayama, 1988) Afghanistan
- Agriades walterfoster (Koçak, 1996) China

The orbitulus species-group:

- Agriades amphirroe (Oberthür, 1910) Tibet
- Agriades arcaseia (Fruhstorfer, 1916) Sikkim, Tibet
- Agriades armathea (Fruhstorfer, 1916) China
- Agriades artenita (Fruhstorfer, 1916) China
- Agriades asiatica (Elwes, 1882) Central Asia, Himalaya
- Agriades lehanus (Moore, 1878) Himalaya, Kashmir, Tibet
- Agriades orbitulus (de Prunner, 1798) – alpine argus
- Agriades orbona (Grum-Grshimailo, 1891) China
- Agriades pharis (Fawcett, 1903) Himalaya, Sikkim
- Agriades shahidulla (Yoshino, 2003) China

The optilete species-group:

- Agriades optilete (Knoch, 1781) – cranberry blue
