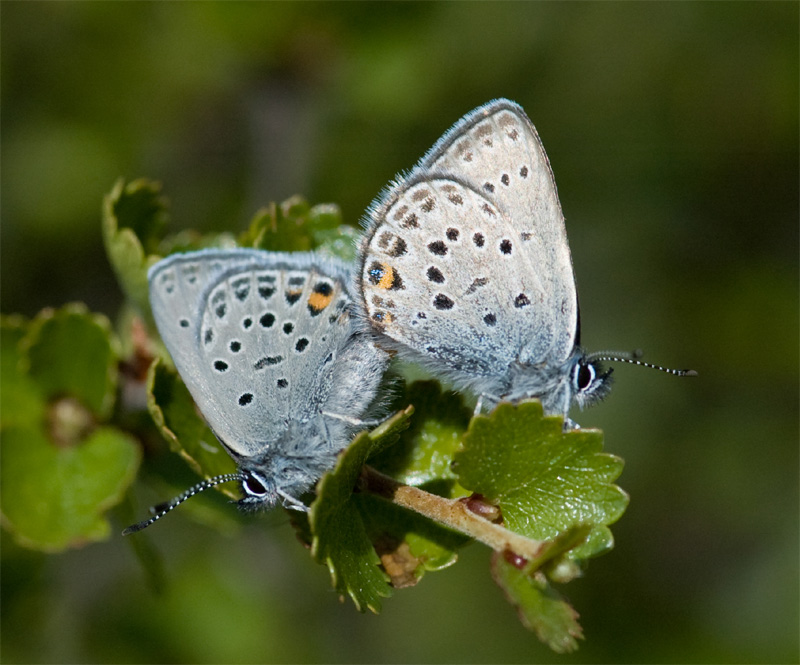
- Mating

Conservation status
- Apparently Secure (NatureServe)

Scientific classification
- Kingdom: Animalia
- Phylum: Arthropoda
- Clade: Pancrustacea
- Class: Insecta
- Order: Lepidoptera
- Family: Lycaenidae
- Genus: Agriades
- Species: A. optilete

Binomial name
- Agriades optilete (Knoch, 1781)

Synonyms
- Papilio optilete Knoch, 1781; Vacciniina optilete; Albulina optilete; Plebejus optilete; Plebeius optilete

= Agriades optilete =

Species of butterfly

Agriades optilete, the cranberry blue, is a butterfly of the family Lycaenidae. It is found in north eastern Europe, the Alps, North Asia, Japan, Korea and north western North America.

The length of the forewings is about 14 mm. The butterfly flies from June to August depending on the location.

The larvae feed on Vaccinium oxycoccos, Empetrum nigrum, bilberry and other cranberry and Empetrum species.

== Description from Seitz ==
L. optilete Knoch (79 b). This species is quite out of place in the present group of Lycaena in characters as well as habits, and would be much better placed in a later group than here where it stands in Staudinger-Rebel's Catalogue. Both wings very broad and their outer margins strongly rounded. Male above very dull dark violet-blue, sometimes with a broader black margin, sometimes without black margin. In the female only the basal half of the upperside is dusted with glossy blue scales. Underside dirty dust-grey, the ocelli very large, often distorted; only the anal area of the hindwing beneath bears orange spots before the margin, from which they are separated by two large round dots with metallic centres. More in the North, in Central and North Europe as far as Scandinavia and the Baltic provinces, sporadic, on moors, also in the Alps in damp larch-woods, locally abundant. — Now and again the species appears in a smaller form, especially in the high Alps (Valais, Engadine), in Lapland, North Einland, and North Siberia. This is cyparissus Hbn. (79 b). Its underside is purer dust -grey, the black spots are smaller, more compact, sharper, more regularly arranged, less distorted or widened; the anal red of the hindwing beneath is usually reduced to one or 2 sharply defined spots, not being smear-like or dull as in true optilete. — The two forms are connected not only by the specimens from the Amur — sibirica Stgr. — , but also by transitions frequently found in West Siberia and Europe and sometimes approaching the one form and sometimes the other. The alpine specimens — cyparissus — cannot be separated from the northern ones, as optilete also flies in the Alps and cyparissus in the North. However, the individuals from the High Alps and the High North appear to incline more towards cyparissus, while the form flying on the Sphagnum-swamps of the warmer plains — particularly in North Germany — is the most normal optilete — In the Ural there flies a form with the ground-colour beneath black-grey; this is uralensis Courv. i. l. — ab. subtusradiata Favre are specimens in which the distortion of the ocelli has led to the appearance of rays. — Larva pale green, densely clothed with minute silky reddish yellow hair, and adorned with a light-yellow black-bordered lateral stripe; until June on Vaccinium myrtillus. Pupa rounded, obtuse, anteriorly dotted with small yellowish red hairs, green with yellow abdominal segments. The butterflies from the end of June towards September, locally plentiful, on moors, also in woods of high trees, where it is usually the only Blue found. The butterflies occur there mostly on more open places where there is a bush in the centre from which the males make short excursions. In the Alps often at small rills, here sometimes in large numbers (Zermatt, Eiffelhaus) and often in company with other Lycaenas. In consequence of the broad wings the flight is a little different from that of other Blues, recalling the flight of Cyaniris argiolus, but is low . In the Bucovina the species has been obtained at the end of June and in September, which however is no definite proof that there are two broods.

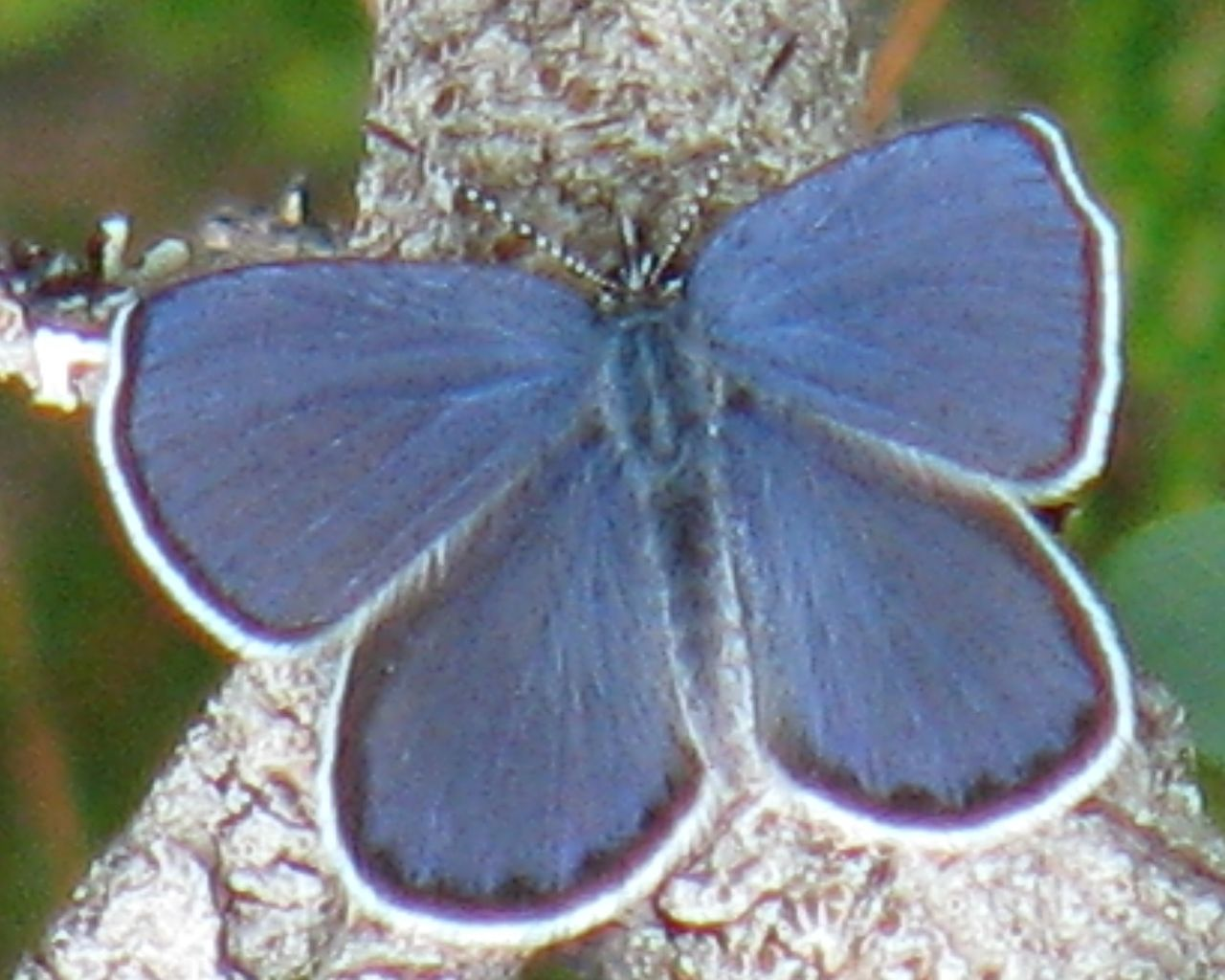
Male

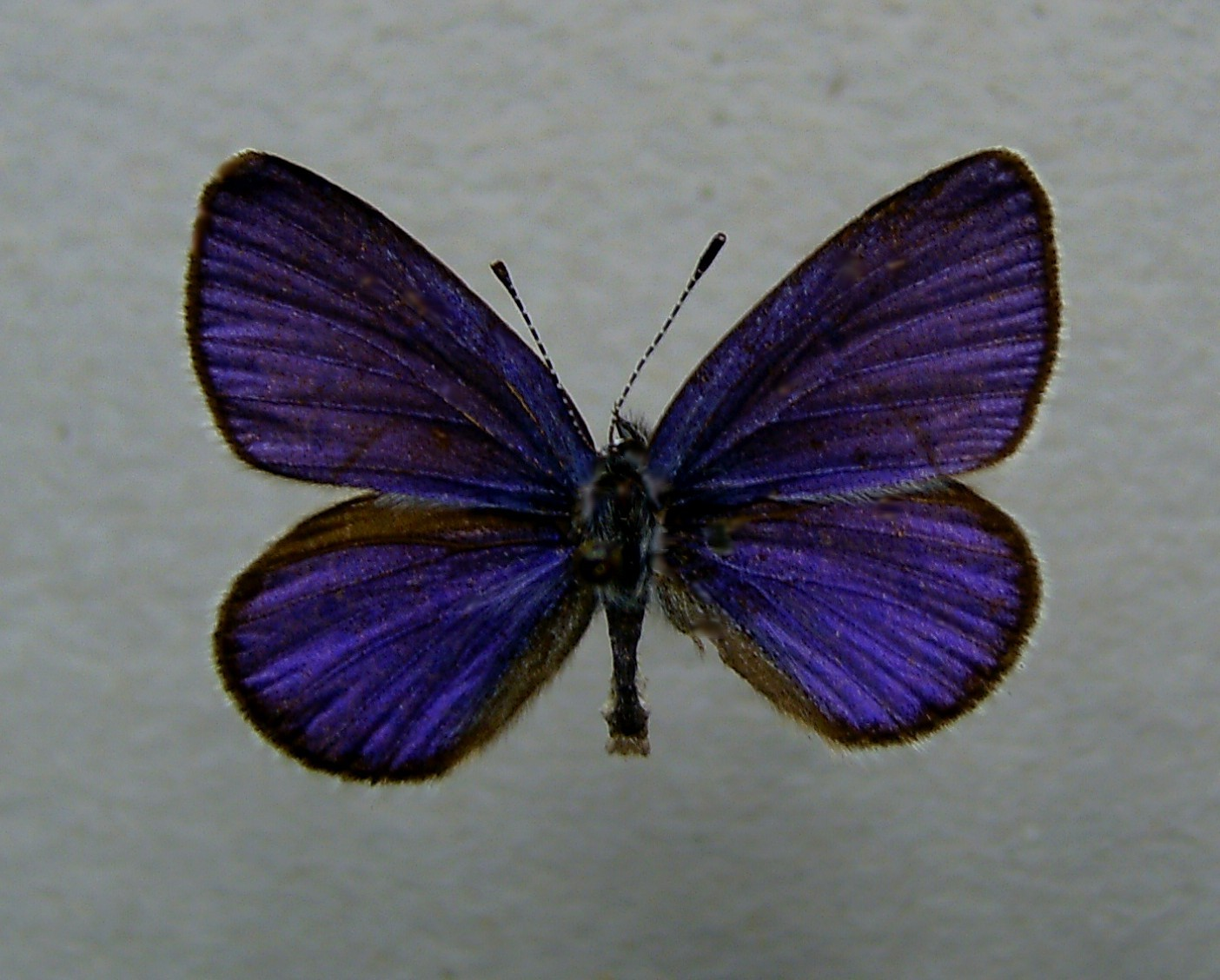
Upperside

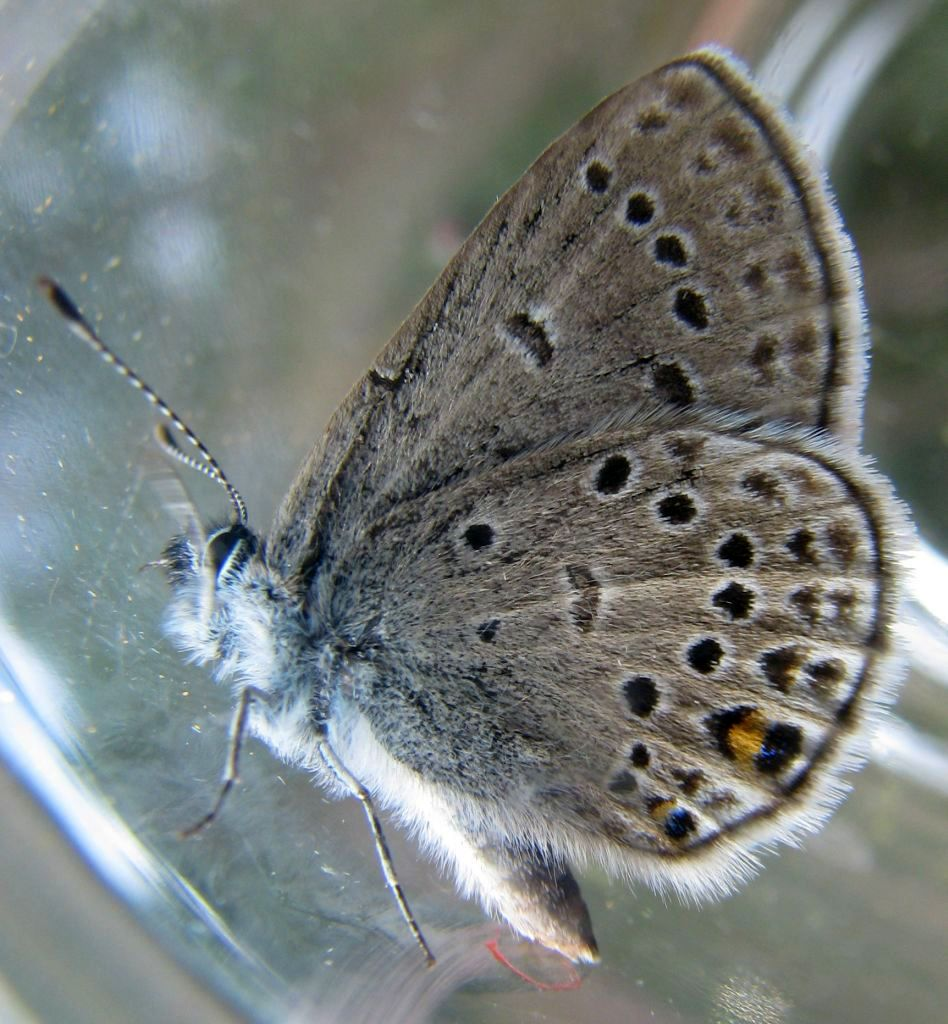
Underside

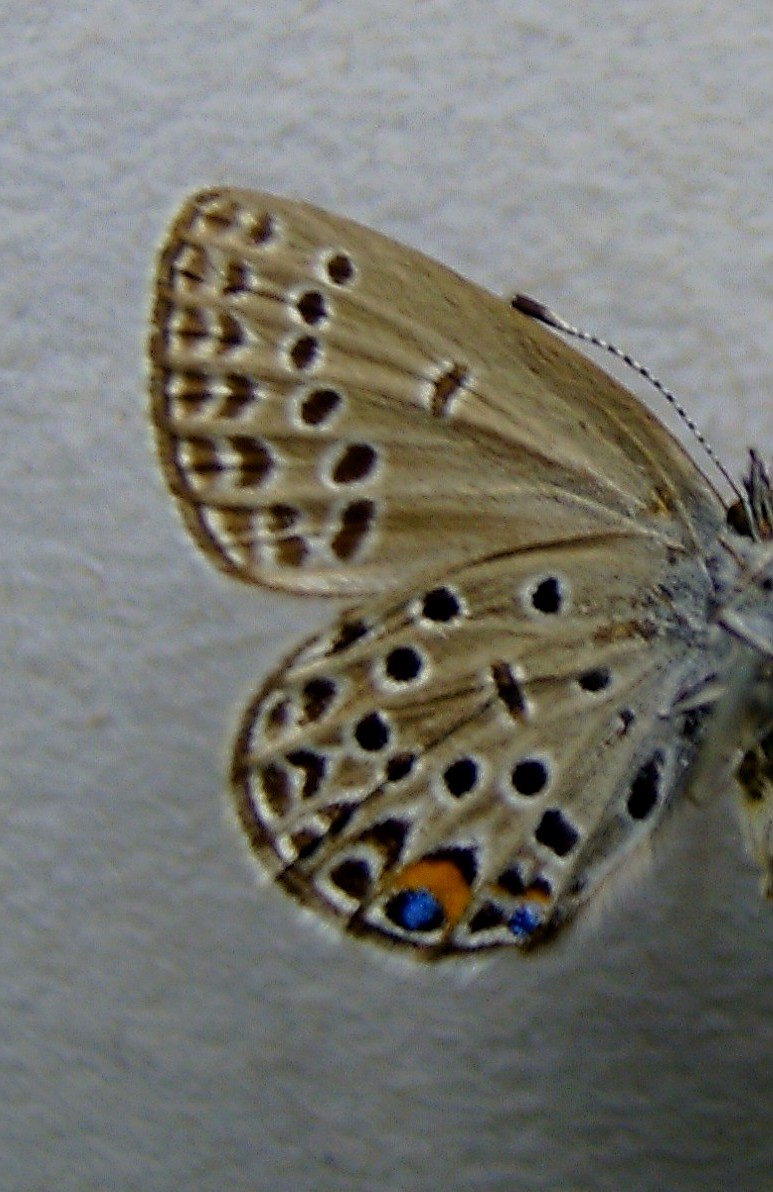
Underside

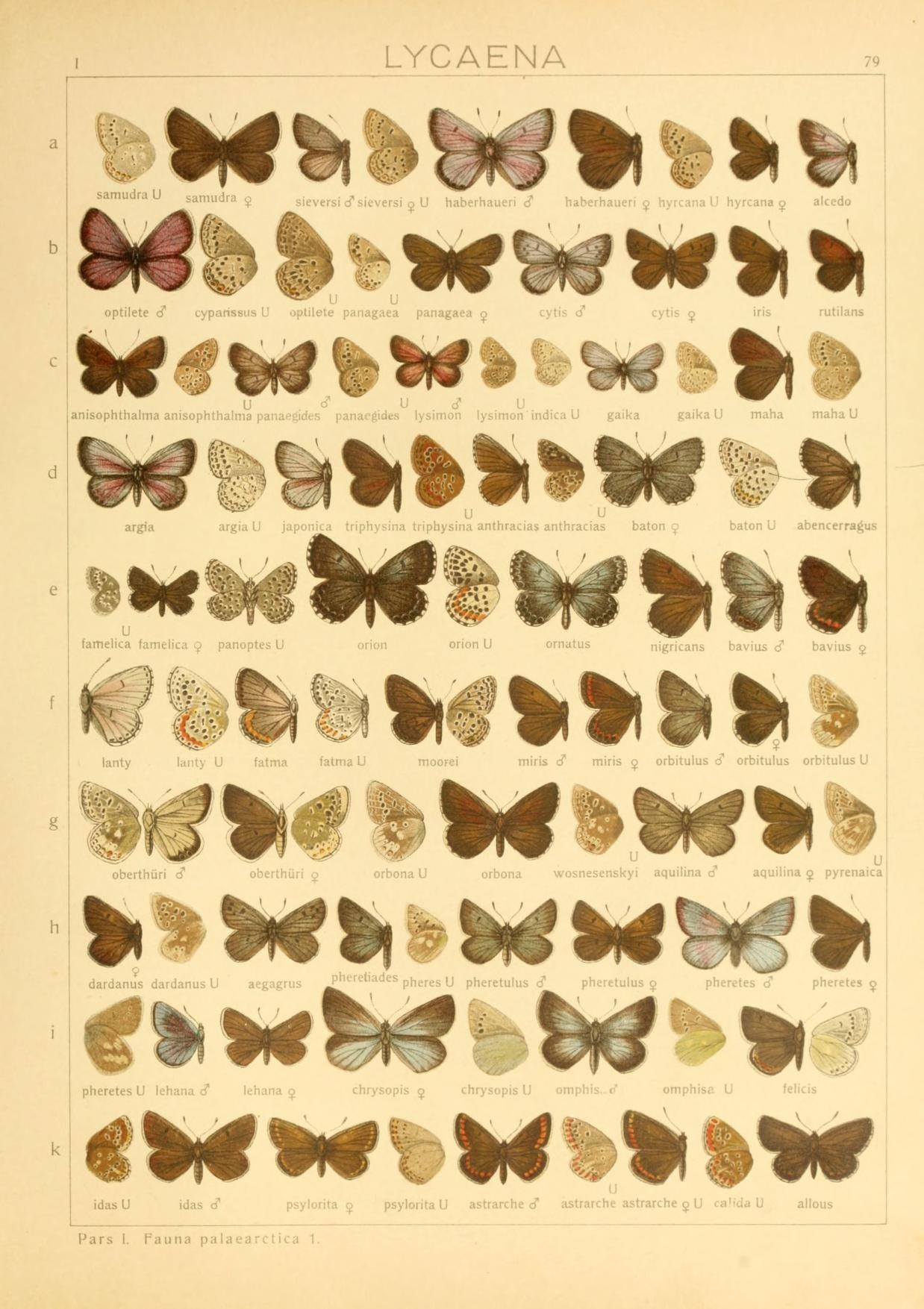
Seitz
