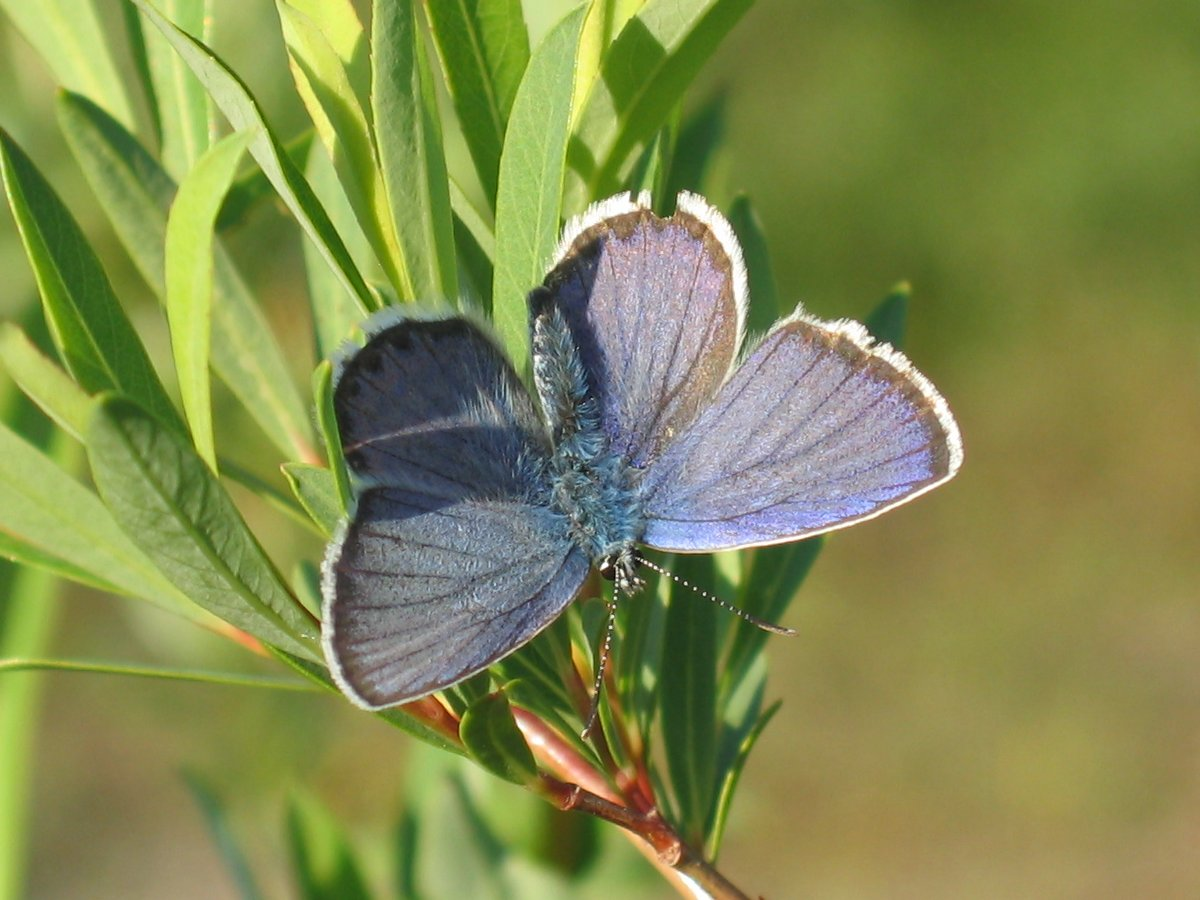
- Plebejus idas. Male, upperside
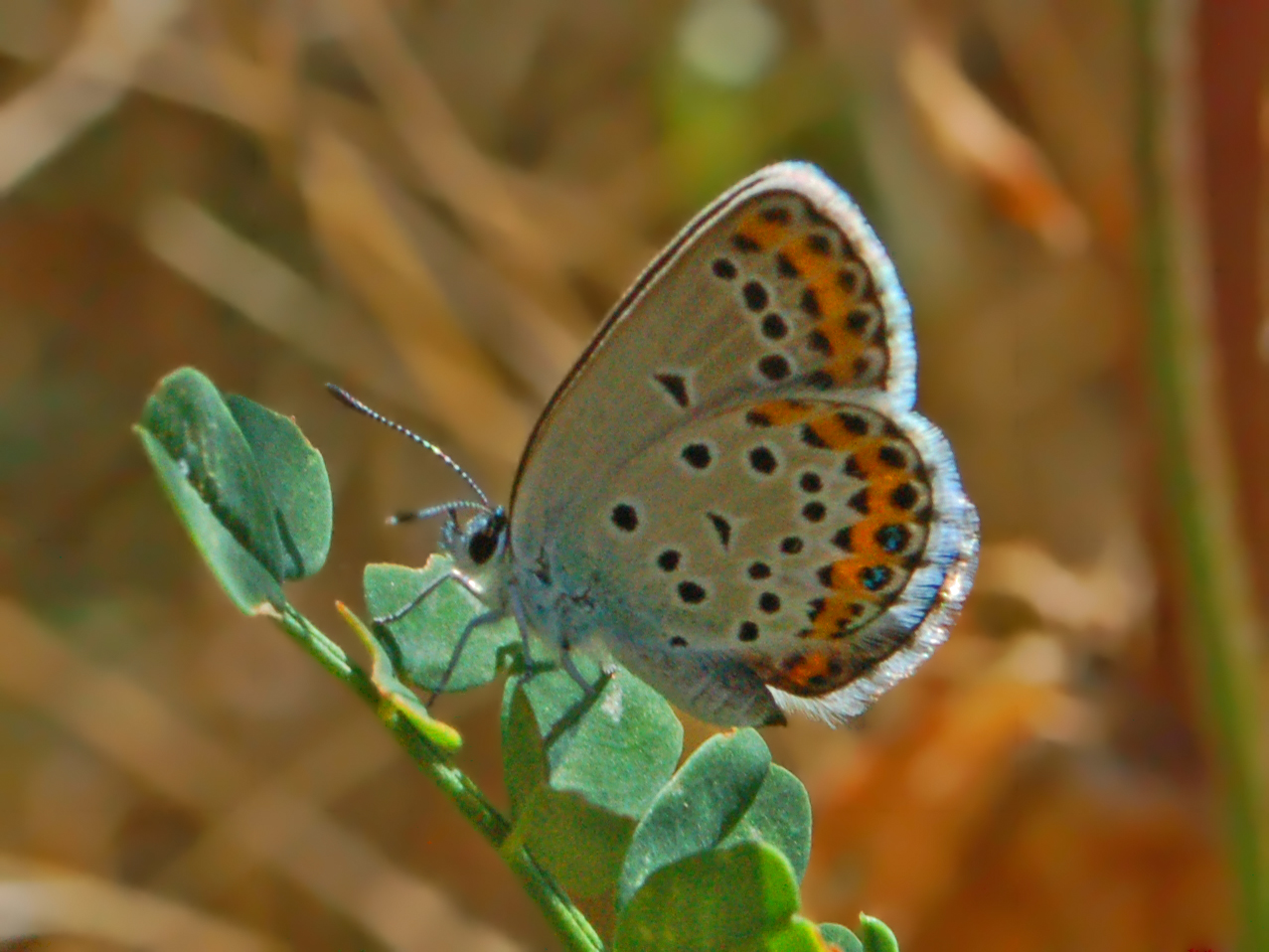
- Plebejus idas. Female, underside

Scientific classification
- Kingdom: Animalia
- Phylum: Arthropoda
- Class: Insecta
- Order: Lepidoptera
- Family: Lycaenidae
- Genus: Plebejus
- Species: P. idas

Binomial name
- Plebejus idas (Linnaeus, 1761)

Synonyms
- Papilio idas Linnaeus, 1761; Lycaeides idas (Linnaeus, 1761); Papilio argus Denis & Schiffermüller, 1775; Papilio leodorus Esper, 1782; Plebejus acdestis (Grum-Grhsimailo, 1890); Lycaena argus armoricana Oberthür, 1910

= Plebejus idas =

Species of butterfly

Plebejus idas, the Idas blue or northern blue, is a butterfly of the family Lycaenidae. It belongs to the subfamily of Polyommatinae.

== Subspecies ==
Subspecies include the following:

- Plebejus idas acreon (Fabricius, 1787)
- Plebejus idas alaskensis F. Chermock, 1945
- Plebejus idas altarmenus (Forster, 1936)
- Plebejus idas argulus (Frey, 1882)
- Plebejus idas aster (Edwards, 1882)
- Plebejus idas atrapraetextus Field, 1939
- Plebejus idas bavarica (Forster, 1936)
- Plebejus idas bellieri (Oberthür, 1910)
- Plebejus idas empetri Freeman, 1938
- Plebejus idas longinus (Nabokov, 1949)
- Plebejus idas lotis Lintner, 1879
- Plebejus idas magnagraeta Verity, 1936
- Plebejus idas nabokovi (Masters, 1972)
- Plebejus idas sareptensis Chapman, 1917
- Plebejus idas scudderi (Edwards, 1861)
- Plebejus idas sublivens (Nabokov, 1949)
- Plebejus idas tshimganus (Forster, 1936)

Plebejus idas lotis (syn. Lycaeides idas lotis, Lycaeides argyrognomon lotis, Plebejus anna lotis) - commonly known as lotis blue butterfly - is a critically endangered subspecies native to Mendocino County, California, with sightings in Sonoma and Marin counties. It has been listed as an endangered species since June 1, 1976, but is believed to be extinct since it has not been seen in the wild since 1994.

This butterfly is very rare with low population densities. This mainly due to human disturbance effecting and creating changes in vegetation. According to the Nature Conservancy, it is critically endangered. It is ranked as Ti, critically imperiled (Zverev, 2021). In the summer of 2014, a fire in Vastmanland in South Central Sweden affected an area of 13,100 ha. After the fire the Idas Blues along with other species increased in numbers. This is presumed to be because of an increase in larval host plant abundance.

== Distribution ==
This species can be found in most of Europe (except parts of Spain, southern Italy and the United Kingdom), in the northern regions of the Palearctic (Siberia, mountains of South Siberia and Yakutia) and in the Nearctic realms.

== Habitat ==
It usually inhabits grassy flowery areas, mixed evergreen forests and wet meadows up to alpine levels, at an elevation of 200–2,100 metres (660–6,890 ft) above sea level.

== Description ==
Plebejus idas has a wingspan of 17–28 mm. This species is quite variable in colors and markings. The upperside of male's wings is iridescent blue, while it is brown with orange submarginal spots in the females. The underface of the wings is greyish with black spots and it shows a thin black line and small dots along outer margin. Along these margins are also present a rather large orange band with blue spots.

This species is very similar to the Silver studded blue (Plebejus argus) and to the Reverdin's blue (Plebejus argyrognomon). The forelegs of male of Plebejus idas lacks a hook which is present in Plebejus argus.

== Biology ==
The species flies in a single brood from June to August depending on location. The larvae feed on Calluna vulgaris, Vaccinium uliginosum, Empetrum nigrum and various Fabaceae species (mainly Cercis siliquastrum, Melilotus albus, Lotus corniculatus, Cytisus, Genista tinctoria, Trifolium pratense, Chrysaspis campestris, Astragalus alpinus and Anthyllis). They are usually attended by ants (Lasius and Formica species). Second-stage of the caterpillars overwinter. Male butterflies will patrol and find plants to host the female butterflies. The female butterflies will lay the eggs on the host plant stems or debris (Bálint, 2020).

== Etymology ==
Named in the Classical tradition.In Greek mythology Idas is an argonaut.

== Gallery ==
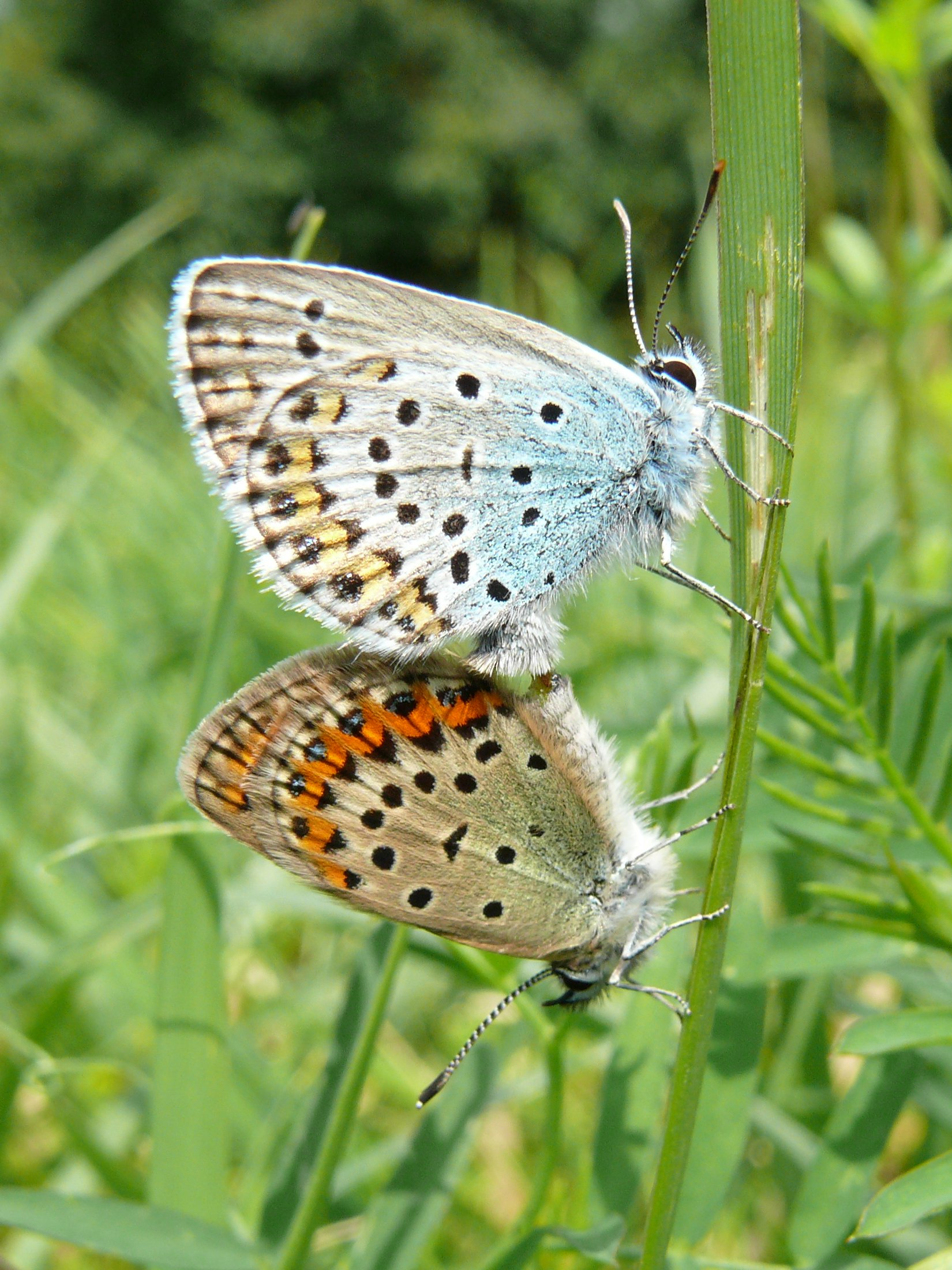
Mating pair

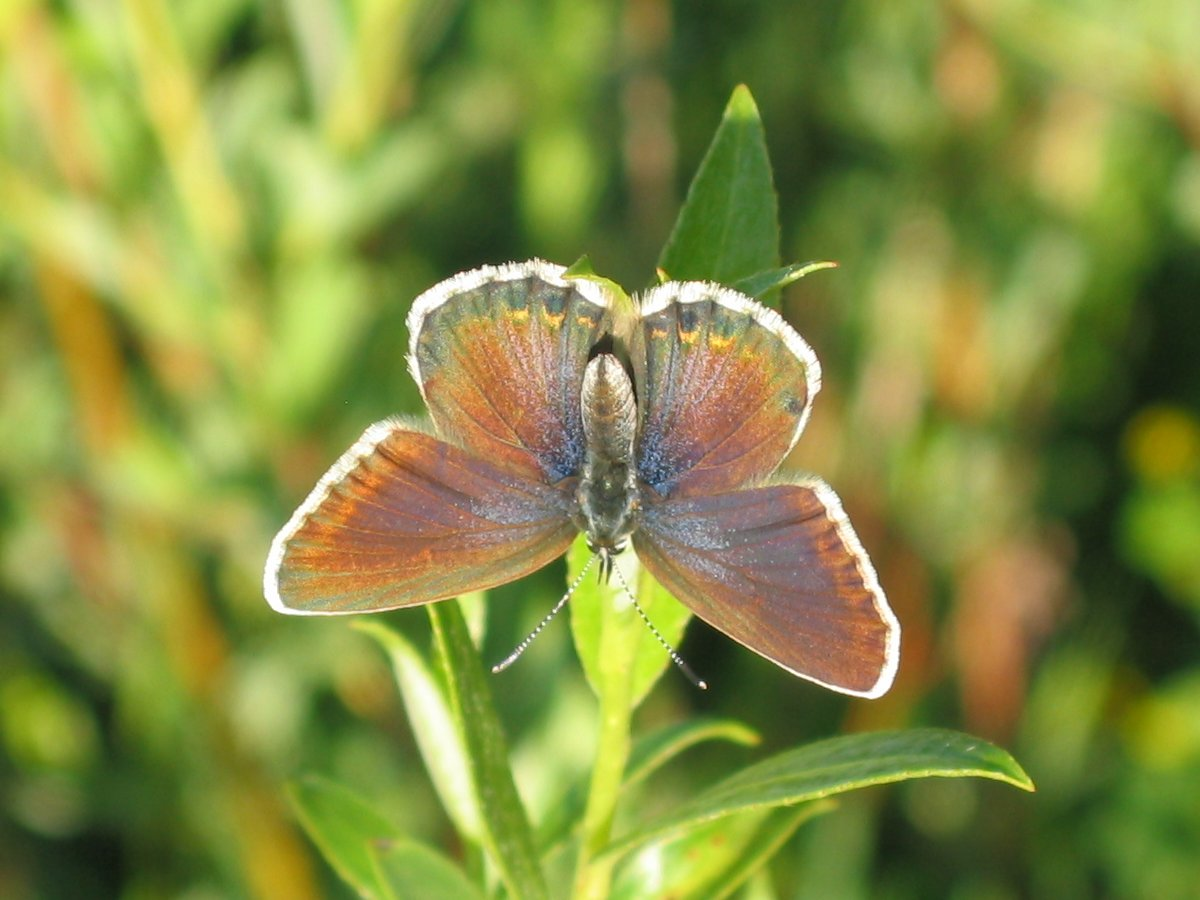
Female, upperside

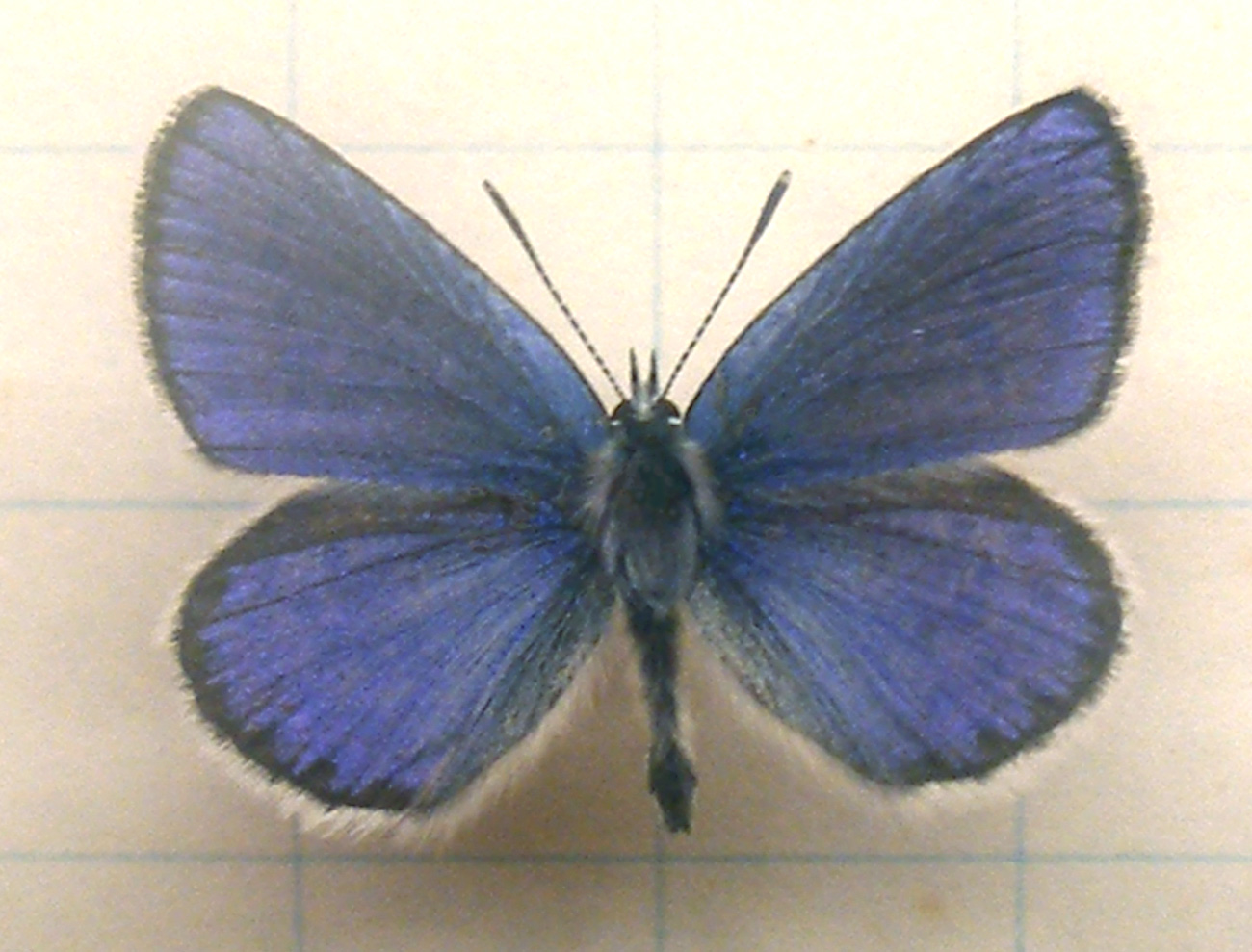
Mounted specimen. Male, upperside

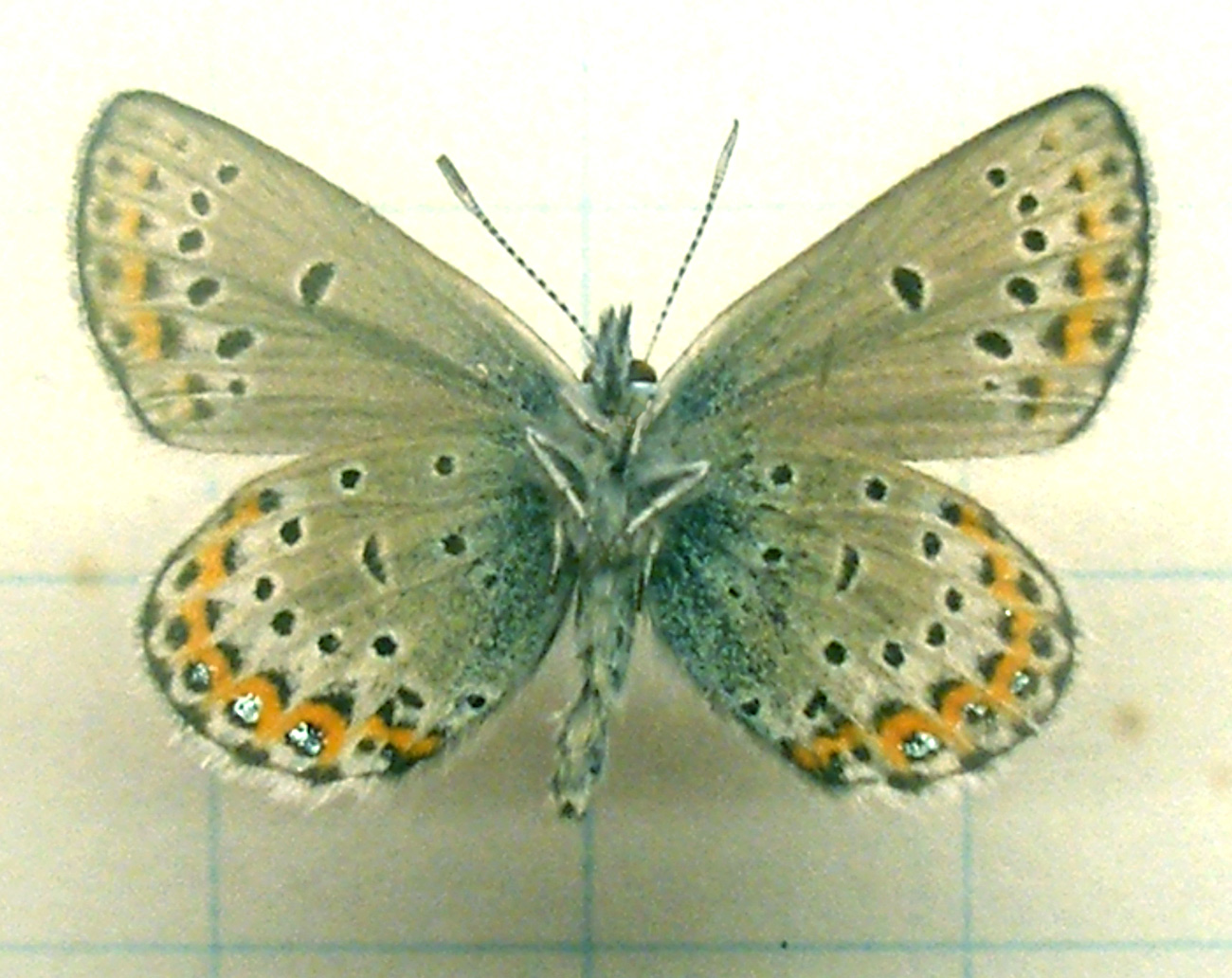
Male, underside

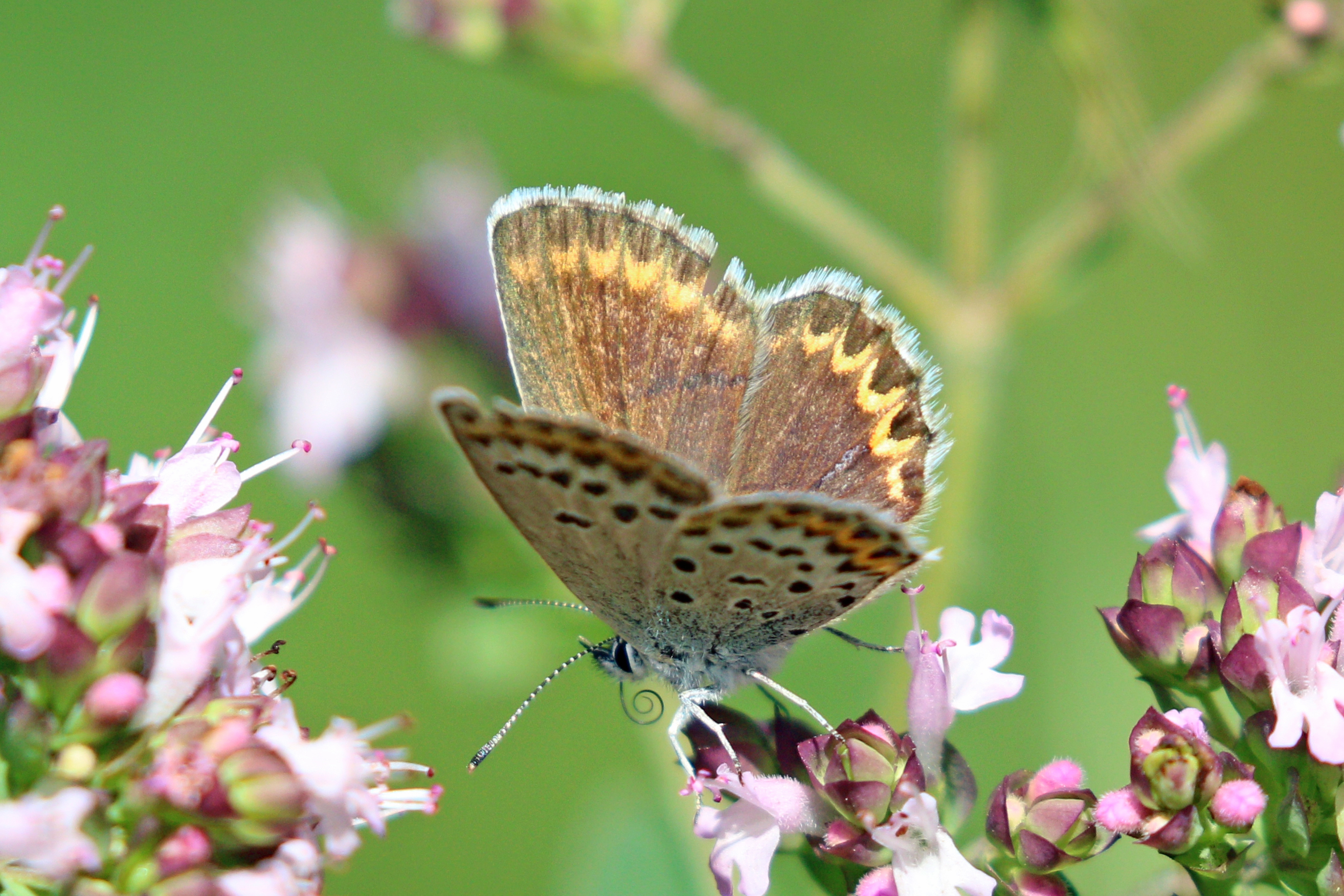
P. i. baldur, Bulgaria

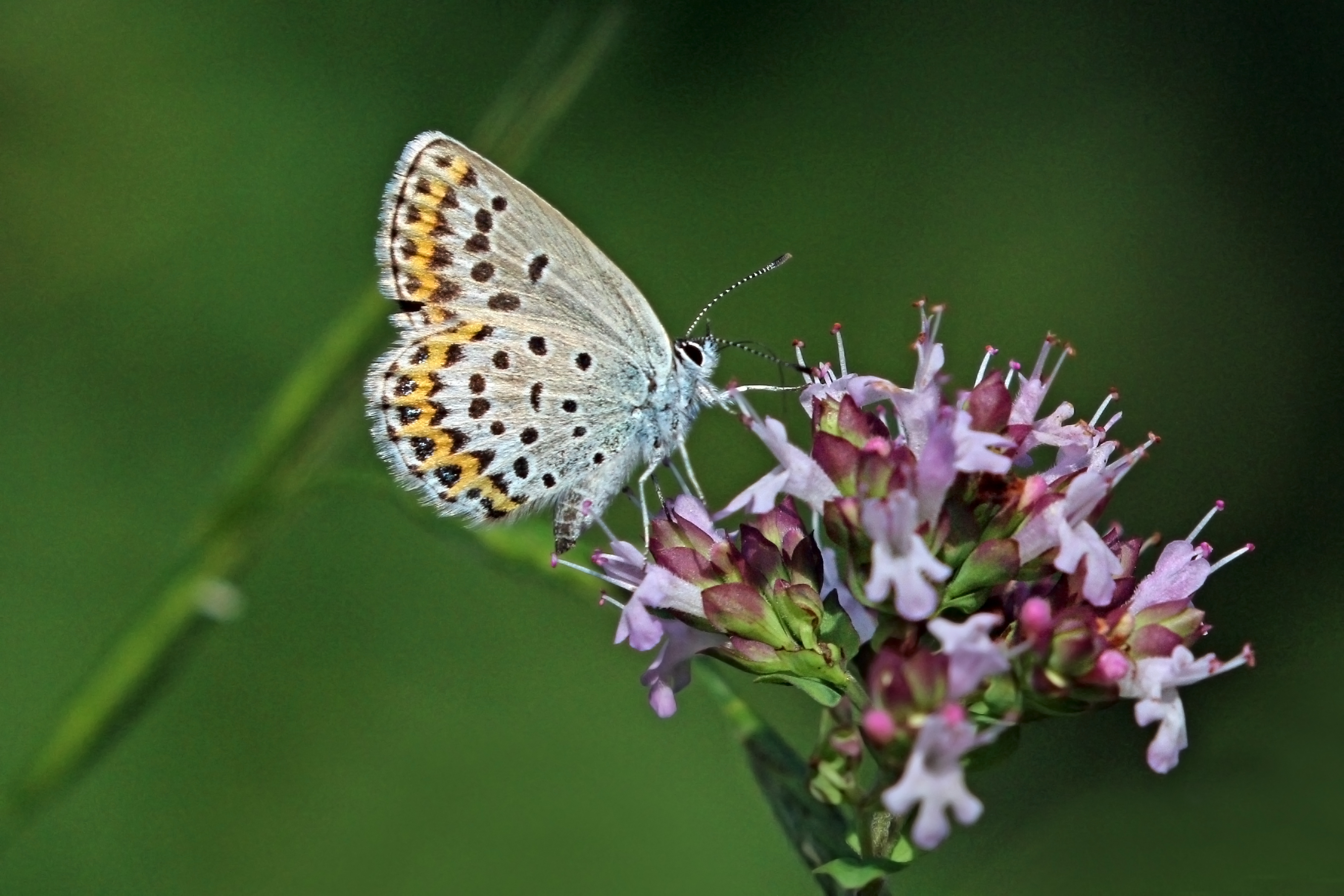
P. i. baldur, Bulgaria
