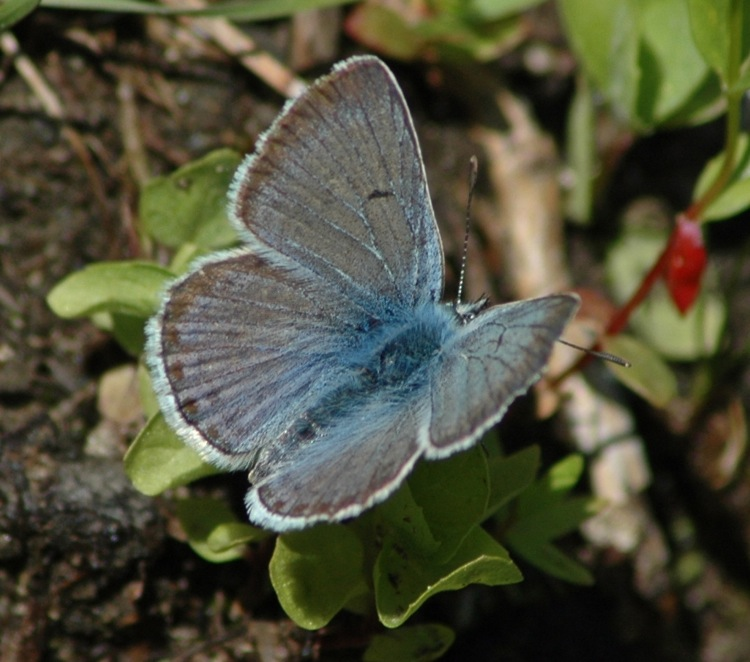

Conservation status
- Apparently Secure (NatureServe)

Scientific classification
- Kingdom: Animalia
- Phylum: Arthropoda
- Clade: Pancrustacea
- Class: Insecta
- Order: Lepidoptera
- Family: Lycaenidae
- Genus: Agriades
- Species: A. podarce

Binomial name
- Agriades podarce (C. & R. Felder, [1865])

Synonyms
- Lycaena podarce C. & R. Felder, [1865]; Plebejus podarce; Cupido podarce; Agriades glandon podarce; Lycaena tehama Reakirt, 1866; Lycaena cilla Behr, 1867; Lycaena nestos Boisduval, 1869

= Agriades podarce =

Species of butterfly

Agriades podarce, the arrowhead Arctic blue, gray blue or Sierra Nevada blue, is a butterfly in the family Lycaenidae. It is found in North America from southern Oregon to central California in the Klamath Range and the Sierra Nevada. The habitat consists of subalpine meadows.

The wingspan is 22–26 mm. Adults are on wing from June to September in one generation per year. They feed on flower nectar, including yellow composites and bistort.

The larvae feed on Dodecatheon jeffreyi. Caterpillars or chrysalids hibernate.

== Subspecies ==
- Agriades podarce podarce
- Agriades podarce cilla (Behr, 1867) (California)
- Agriades podarce klamathensis J. Emmel & T. Emmel, 1998 (Oregon, California)
