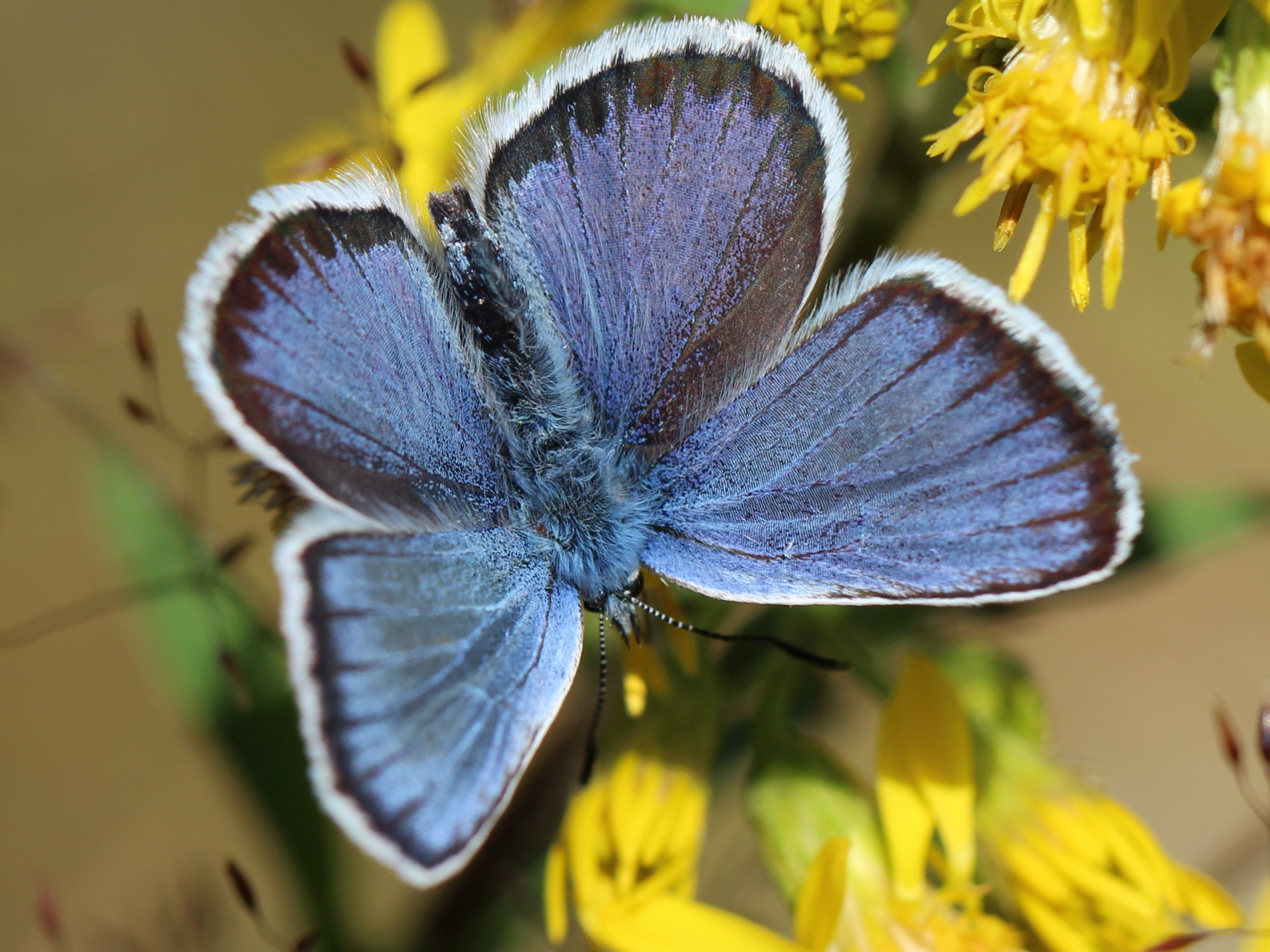
- Plebejus argus

Scientific classification
- Domain: Eukaryota
- Kingdom: Animalia
- Phylum: Arthropoda
- Class: Insecta
- Order: Lepidoptera
- Family: Lycaenidae
- Subfamily: Polyommatinae
- Tribe: Polyommatini
- Genus: Plebejus; Kluk, 1780

Synonyms
- Lycaeides Hübner, [1819]; Lycoena Nicholl, 1901; Plebeius Kluk, 1780 (lapsus); Rusticus Hübner, 1806 (suppressed)

= Plebejus =

Butterfly genus in family Lycaenidae

Plebejus is a genus of butterflies in the family Lycaenidae. Its species are found in the Palearctic and Nearctic realms.

== Taxonomy ==
As a result of studies of molecular phylogenetics, numerous species that were included in Plebejus by some authors at the beginning of the 21st century have now been moved to separate genera again. These species may be found in Afarsia, Alpherakya, Agriades, Aricia, Eumedonia, Icaricia, Kretania, Maurus, Pamiria, Patricius, Plebejidea, Plebulina, and Rueckbeilia.

== Species ==
Species include:

The ardis species-group:

- Plebejus eversmanni (Lang, 1884) Kopet-Dagh, Ghissar, Darvaz, Pamirs-Alai, Tian-Shan, Afghanistan, Uzbekistan
- Plebejus baroghila (Tytler, 1926) Himalayas
- Plebejus firuskuhi (Forster, 1940) Afghanistan
- Plebejus kwaja (Evans, 1932) Baluchistan

The argus species-group:

- Plebejus aegidion (Gerhard, 1851) Central Asia
- Plebejus argus (Linnaeus, 1758) – silver-studded blue

The idas species-group (a.k.a. subgenus Lycaeides):

- Plebejus agnata (Rühl, 1895)
- Plebejus argyrognomon (Bergsträsser, [1779]) – Reverdin's blue
- Plebejus pseudaegon (Butler, [1882]) Ussuri, North China, North Korea, Japan
- Plebejus sinica (Forster, 1936) Sichuan
- Plebejus maracandica (Erschoff, 1874) Russia, Transbaikalia, Yakutia, Magadan. Mongolia, Kamchatka
- Plebejus caspica (Forster, 1936) South Urals
- Plebejus lepidus Zhdanko, 2000 Kazakhstan
- Plebejus uiguricus Zhdanko, 2000 ltai, Saur, Tarbagatai Mts., Dzhungarsky Alatau
- Plebejus mongolicus Rühl, [1893] Transbaikalia, Amur, Mongolia
- Plebejus baldur (Hemming, 1934) Kurdistan, Levant
- Plebejus bellieri (Oberthür, 1910) Corsica
- Plebejus argiva (Staudinger, 1886) Kazakhstan, Alai
- Plebejus christophi (Staudinger, 1874) – small jewel blue
- Plebejus anikini Yakovlev, 2012 Mongolia
- Plebejus germani Yakovlev, 2012 Mongolia
- Plebejus roxane (Grum-Grshimailo, 1887) Tajikistan, Afghanistan
- Plebejus idas (Linnaeus, 1761) – Idas blue or northern blue
- Plebejus ganssuensis (Grum-Grshimailo, 1891) Kuku-Noor, China
- Plebejus nushibi Zhdanko, 2000 Kazakhstan
- Plebejus calliopis (Boisduval, 1832) Alps, boreal Europe and Transcaucasia to Russian Far East and Kamchatka
- Plebejus anna (Edwards, 1861) – Anna's blue
- Plebejus melissa (Edwards, 1873) – Melissa blue or orange-bordered blue
- Plebejus fridayi (Chermock, 1945) Oregon
- Plebejus nevadensis (Oberthür, 1910) Iberia
- Plebejus tomyris (Grum-Grshimailo, 1890) Amur
- Plebejus samudra (Moore, [1875]) Northwest India, Hindu Kush
- Plebejus rogneda (Grum-Grshimailo, 1890) Kashgar, Darvaz, Pamirs, Transalai
- Plebejus subsolanus (Eversmann, 1851) Transbaikalia, Amur, Ussuri, Mongolia, Korea, Japan.
- Plebejus iburiensis (Butler, [1882]) Japan
- Plebejus cleobis (Bremer, 1861) Siberia, Altai, Transbaikalia, Russian Far East, Amur, Ussuri, Japan

Ungrouped:

- Plebejus sharga Churkin, 2004 Mongolia
- Plebejus shuroabadica (Shchetkin, 1963) Tajikistan
- Plebejus dzhizaki Zhdanko, 2000 Uzbekistan
- Plebejus bergi Kusnezov, 1908 Kazakhstan
- Plebejus noah (Herz, 1900) Turan
- Plebejus qinghaiensis (Murayama, 1992)
- Plebejus hishikawai (Yoshino, 2003) Tibet
- Plebejus callaghani Carbonell & Naderi, 2007 Iran
- Plebejus choltagi (Zhdanko & Churkin, 2001)
- Plebejus fyodor Hsu, Bálint & Johnson, 2000
- Plebejus maidantagi Zhdanko & Churkin, 2001
- Plebejus tillo Zhdanko & Churkin, 2001
- Plebejus churkini Zhdanko, 2001 Tian-Shan
- Plebejus exterius Zhdanko, 2001 Tian-Shan
- Plebejus zhdankoi Churkin, 2002 Tian-Shan
- Plebejus mellarius Churkin & Zhdanko, 2008 Kyrgyzstan
- Plebejus arpa (Churkin & Pletnev, 2012) Kyrgyzstan
- Plebejus aleremiticus (Churkin & Pletnev, 2012) Tajikistan
