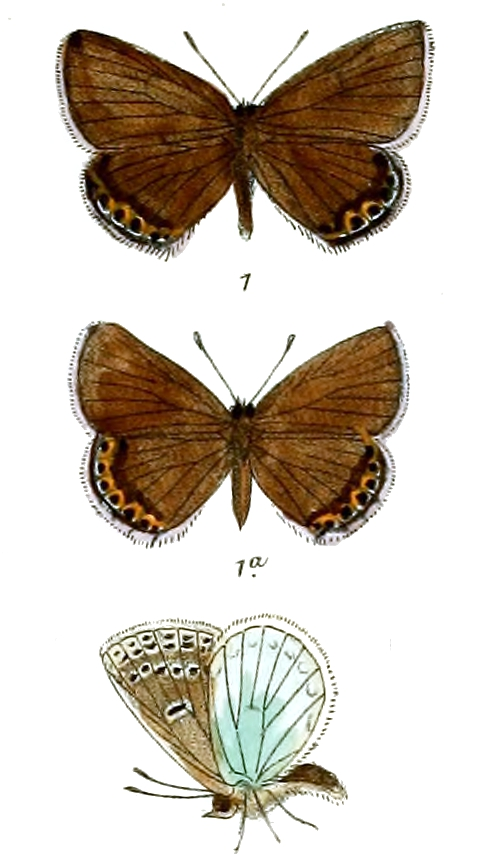
- Illustration of Patricius felicis.

Scientific classification
- Domain: Eukaryota
- Kingdom: Animalia
- Phylum: Arthropoda
- Class: Insecta
- Order: Lepidoptera
- Family: Lycaenidae
- Subfamily: Polyommatinae
- Tribe: Polyommatini
- Genus: Patricius; Bálint, 1991

Synonyms
- Themisia Zhdanko, 2002

= Patricius (butterfly) =

Butterfly genus in family Lycaenidae

Patricius is a Palearctic genus of butterflies in the family Lycaenidae.

== Species ==
Listed alphabetically:

- Patricius felicis (Oberthür, 1886) Tibet
- Patricius gaborronkayi (Bálint, 1997) Nepal, Tibet
- Patricius lucifera (Staudinger, 1867) Central Asia
- Patricius lucifuga (Fruhstorfer, 1915) Himalaya
- Patricius lucina (Grum-Grshimailo, 1902) China
- Patricius sagona Zhdanko, 2002 Tibet
- Patricius themis (Grum-Grshimailo, 1891) China
- Patricius younghusbandi (Elwes, 1906) Tibet
