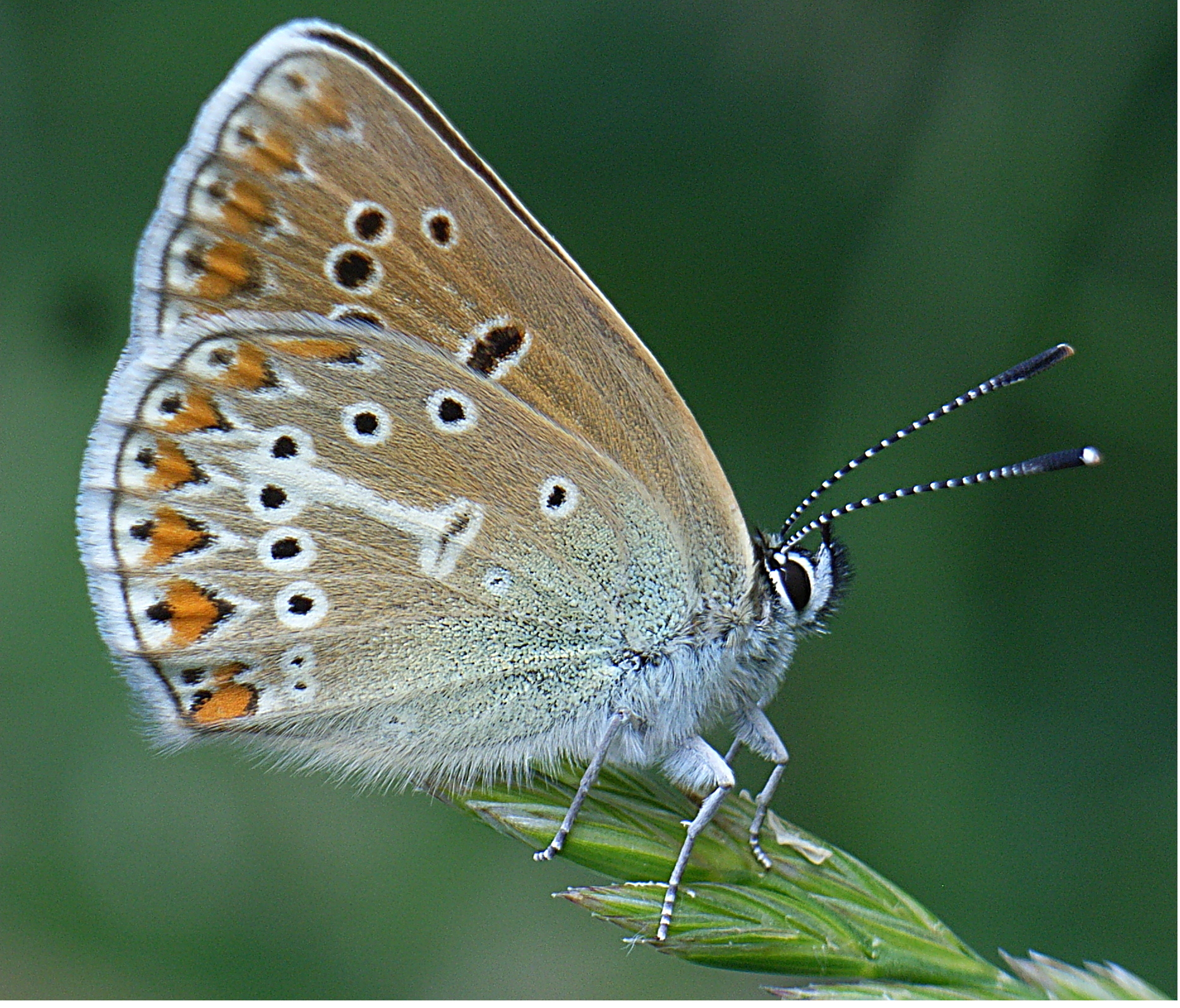
- Eumedonia eumedon

Scientific classification
- Domain: Eukaryota
- Kingdom: Animalia
- Phylum: Arthropoda
- Class: Insecta
- Order: Lepidoptera
- Family: Lycaenidae
- Subfamily: Polyommatinae
- Tribe: Polyommatini
- Genus: Eumedonia; Forster, 1938

= Eumedonia =

Butterfly genus in family Lycaenidae

Eumedonia is a Palearctic genus of butterflies in the family Lycaenidae first described by Walter Forster in 1938.

== Species ==
Listed alphabetically:

- Eumedonia annulata (Elwes, 1906) Tibet
- Eumedonia astorica (Evans, 1925) Northwest Himalayas
- Eumedonia eumedon (Esper, 1780) – geranium argus
- Eumedonia kogistana (Grum-Grshimailo, 1888) Darvaz, Pamirs
- Eumedonia lamasem (Oberthür, 1910) Tibet
- Eumedonia persephatta (Alphéraky, 1881) ) Hindu Kush - Tian-Shan, Pamirs-Alai
- Eumedonia privata (Staudinger, 1895) West Himalayas
