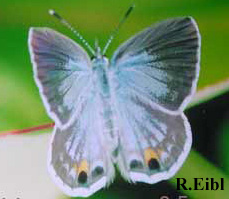

Conservation status
- Endangered (ESA)

- Critically Imperiled (NatureServe)

Scientific classification
- Kingdom: Animalia
- Phylum: Arthropoda
- Clade: Pancrustacea
- Class: Insecta
- Order: Lepidoptera
- Family: Lycaenidae
- Genus: Cyclargus
- Species: C. thomasi
- Subspecies: C. t. bethunebakeri

Trinomial name
- Cyclargus thomasi bethunebakeri W. P Comstock & Huntington, 1943

Synonyms
- Hemiargus thomasi bethunebakeri

= Miami blue =

Subspecies of butterfly

The Miami blue (Cyclargus thomasi bethunebakeri) is a small butterfly that is native to coastal areas of southern Florida. It is a subspecies of Thomas's blue. Once common throughout its range, it has become critically endangered, and is considered to be near extinction. Its numbers have recently been increased by a captive breeding program at the Florida Museum of Natural History.

== Taxonomy ==
The Miami blue has had several synonyms. It was first identified in 1886 as a Florida population (south from the Indian River) of the Cuban butterfly Lycaemon ammon. In 1915 G. T. Bethune-Baker observed that the Florida population of the butterfly then known as Hemiargus ammon was distinct from the Cuban population. The presence of Plebeius ammon in the Dry Tortugas was reported in 1941. The Florida population was assigned a sub-specific status in 1943 as Hemiargus ammon bethune-bakeri, and the species was reassigned to Cyclargus thomasi in 1945, leaving the Miami blue as Cyclargus thomasi bethunebakeri.

== Description ==
The Miami blue has a wingspan of 22 to 28 millimetres (0.87 to 1.10 in). The upper side of the wings is bright metallic blue in males, and dark gray with some blue towards the base of the wings in females. The underside of the wings in both sexes is gray with a white band on the hind wing and four black spots. Larvae vary in color from light green to purple. The pupae may be black or green.

== Biology ==
Females may lay 300 eggs. Females lay one egg at a time, but more than one egg may be laid on a host plant. During most of the year adults emerge from a pupa about 30 days after the egg was laid. Adults have been observed year round, with overlapping multiple generations from May to November, and a winter generation from December to April, with adults and pupae in diapause.

Prior to the 1970s, Miami blues were reported to use grey nickerbeans (Caesalpinia bonduc) and blackbeads (Pithecellobium species) as host plants. Beginning in the 1970s balloonvines were widely reported as hosts for Miami blues, including the native Cardiospermum corindum and the introduced Cardiospermum halicacabum. Recently discovered populations in the Key West National Wildlife Refuge use the Florida Keys blackbead (Pithecellobium keyense) as the preferred host plant. Other plants reported as being used by Miami blues are peacock flower (Caesalpinia pulcherrima), snowberry (Symphoricarpos), and cat's-paw blackbead (Pithecellobium unguis-cati).

Mainland populations of Miami blues laid their eggs on balloon vine (Cardiospermum species). Populations in the lower Florida Keys laid eggs on grey nicker bean (Caesalpinia bonduc). The Miami blues in the Key West National Wildlife Refuge use blackbead (Pithecellobium species).

Rainfall in the Florida Keys may be an important factor in explaining the decline of the Miami blue.

== Range ==
Before the late 20th century, the range of the Miami blue ran from Daytona Beach south around the tip of the peninsula and up to the Tampa Bay area, and throughout the Florida Keys to the Dry Tortugas. Its habitat includes the edges of tropical hardwood hammocks, scrub, and pine rocklands. The Miami blue is the only subspecies of Cyclargus thomasi found in the United States.

The Miami blue butterfly has been reported from Bimini, and as a stray in other parts of The Bahamas. The range of the Miami blue was reduced in the second half of the twentieth century due to the loss of habitat to urban development. The decades of fragmentation have created substantial forest edge areas along roadsides that may place insects like the Miami blue at risk.

It had disappeared from the mainland of Florida and from the barrier islands along the peninsula by 1990. It had become confined to a few spots in the Florida Keys and was becoming rare there. Hurricane Andrew appeared to have wiped out the subspecies in 1992.

Miami blues have limited home ranges. Adults recaptured after having previously being trapped were seldom found more than 25 feet away from the initial trapping location.

== Sightings and breeding programs ==
In 1999 some Miami blues were spotted in Bahia Honda State Park. It was estimated that fewer than fifty of the butterflies were left. Acting on a request from the North American Butterfly Association, the Florida Fish and Wildlife Conservation Commission temporarily listed the Miami blue as endangered on an emergency basis in 2002. The 'endangered' listing was made permanent in 2003. In the meantime, searches had found no other colonies of the Miami blue.

In 2003 the Entomology and Nematology Department at the University of Florida began raising and breeding Miami blues, starting from about 100 eggs collected in the wild. In 2004 they released 2,500 of the insects at selected locations. In August and September 2006 hundreds of captive-bred caterpillars and adult Miami blues were released on Elliott Key in Biscayne National Park. Miami blues have been reintroduced to Everglades National Park and Dagny Johnson Key Largo Hammock Botanical State Park, but all of the attempts prior to May 2009 have failed .

In November and December 2006, more colonies were discovered on Boca Grande Key and the Marquesas Keys in the Key West National Wildlife Refuge. The population on Bahia Honda died out in 2010, and conservation efforts were then focused on the colonies in the Key West National Wildlife Refuge. Another colony of breeding Miami blue butterflies was discovered in the Great White Heron National Wildlife Refuge in 2016.

The Miami blue butterfly is listed as an Endangered species by the state of Florida and the federal government. It is listed as a Critically Imperiled subspecies by NatureServe.
