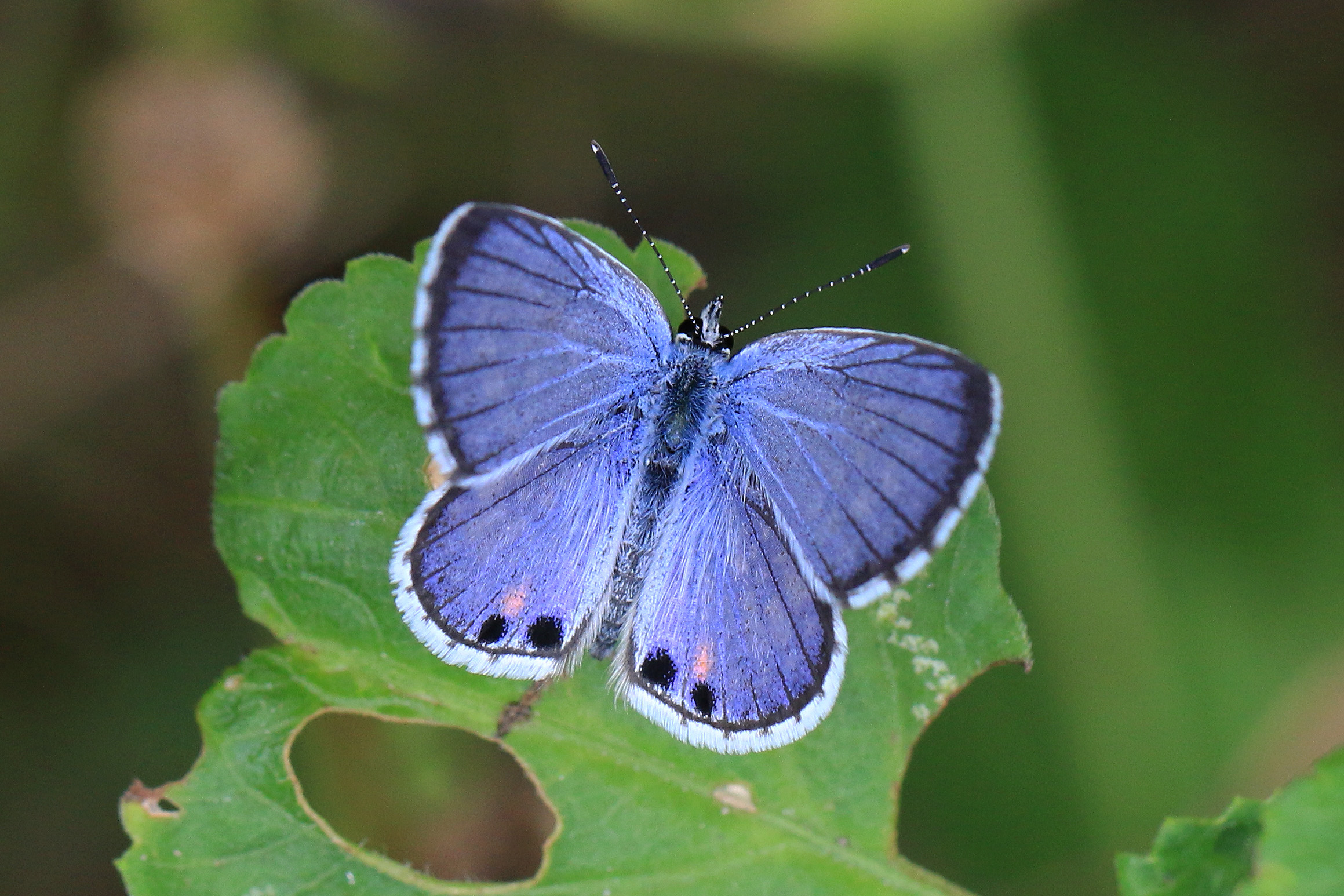
- C. a. erembis male
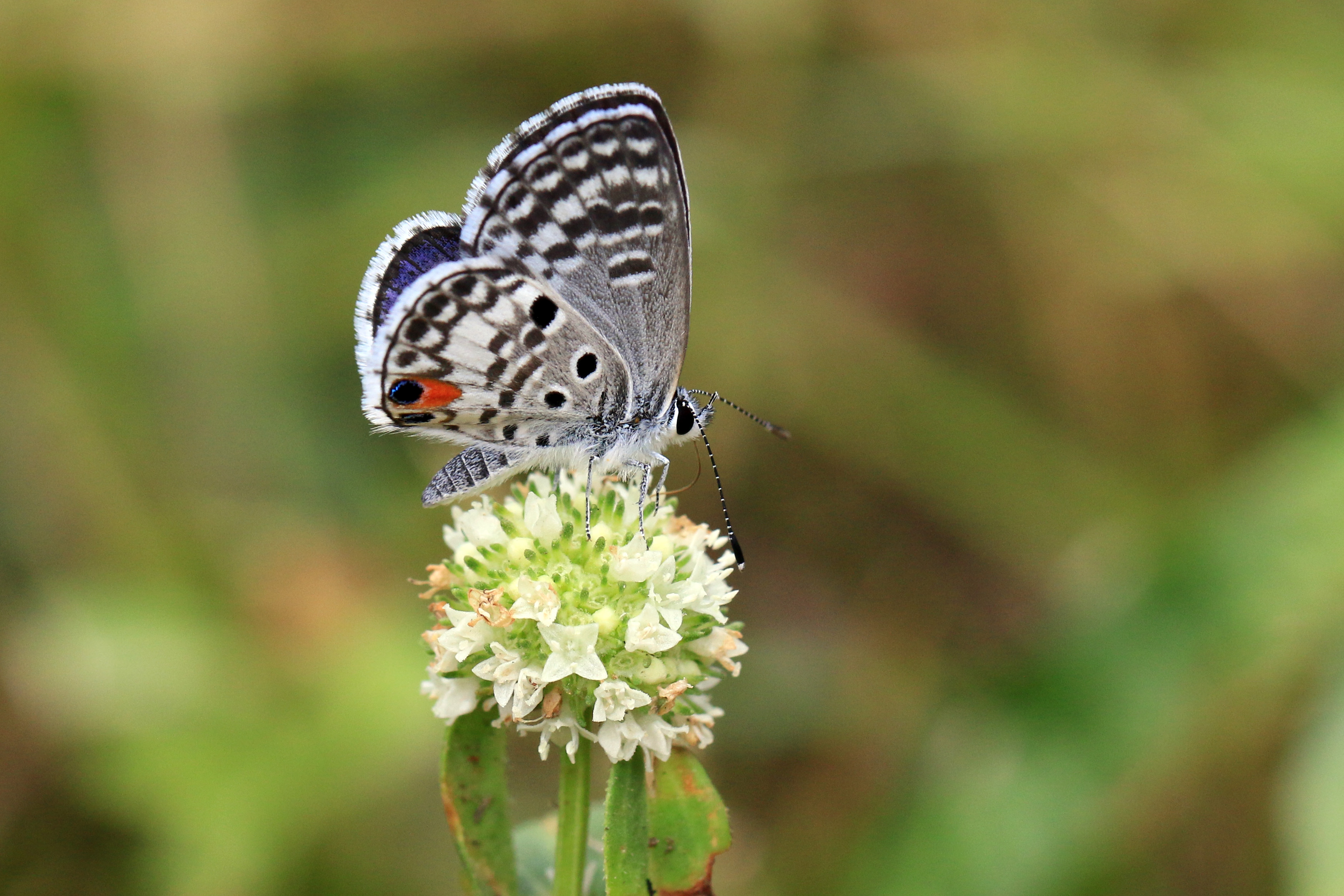
- Both on Grand Cayman

Scientific classification
- Kingdom: Animalia
- Phylum: Arthropoda
- Clade: Pancrustacea
- Class: Insecta
- Order: Lepidoptera
- Family: Lycaenidae
- Subfamily: Polyommatinae
- Tribe: Polyommatini
- Genus: Cyclargus; Nabokov, 1948

= Cyclargus =

Butterfly genus in family Lycaenidae

Cyclargus is a genus of butterflies in the family Lycaenidae. It was split off from the genus Hemiargus in 1948 by Vladimir Nabokov, although many lepidopterists have not accepted the new genus as valid. Nabokov designated C. ammon (Lucas's blue, from Cuba) as the type species for the genus, and included C. dominica (Jamaican blue, from Jamaica), C. thomasi (Thomas's blue, from Florida, the Bahamas, Puerto Rico and Hispaniola), C. woodruffi (from the Virgin Islands) and C. erembis (from the Cayman Islands, synonym of C. ammon erembis). In 1953, Rindge and Comstock described C. huntingtoni (from Curaçao, synonym of Hemiargus huntingtoni, with local names Huntington's Hairstreak in English and Maron Skars in Papiamento). In 1992 K. Johnston and Matusik described C. sorpresus and C. kathleena, both from Hispaniola.

The critically endangered Miami blue (C. thomasi bethunebakeri) is a member of the genus.

C. a. erembis was described originally as a full species, as opinion is at present divided as to whether or not this might be its status.
