= Zhiming Yu Chunjiao =

志明與春嬌, placeholder names in Chinese, may refer to:

- Chih Ming & Chun Chiao, 2016 Taiwanese web series starring Hsueh Shih-ling
- Love in a Puff (film), 2010 Hong Kong romantic comedy film
- “Peter and Mary”, 1999 Taiwanese track by Mayday in the album Mayday's First Album

== See also ==
- Love in a Puff (disambiguation)
