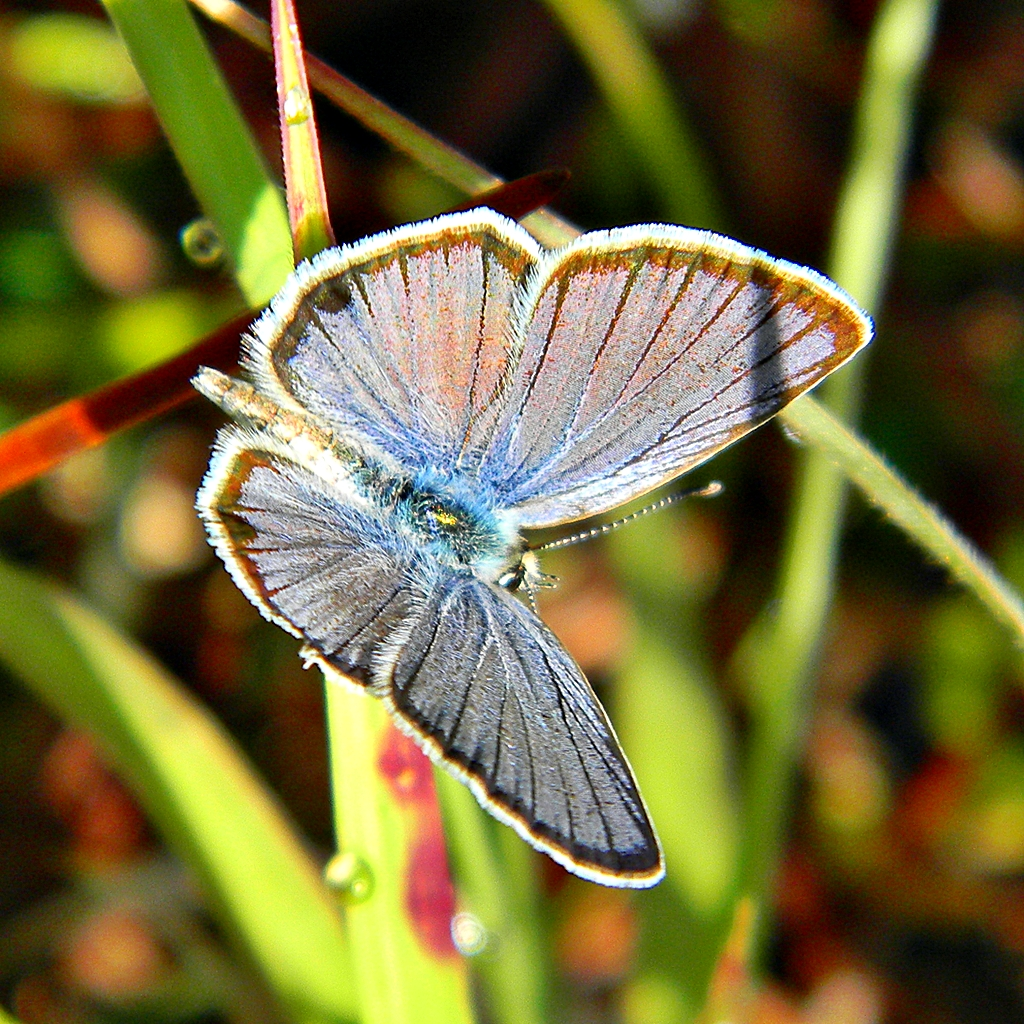
- Hemiargus ceraunus antibubastus, Florida
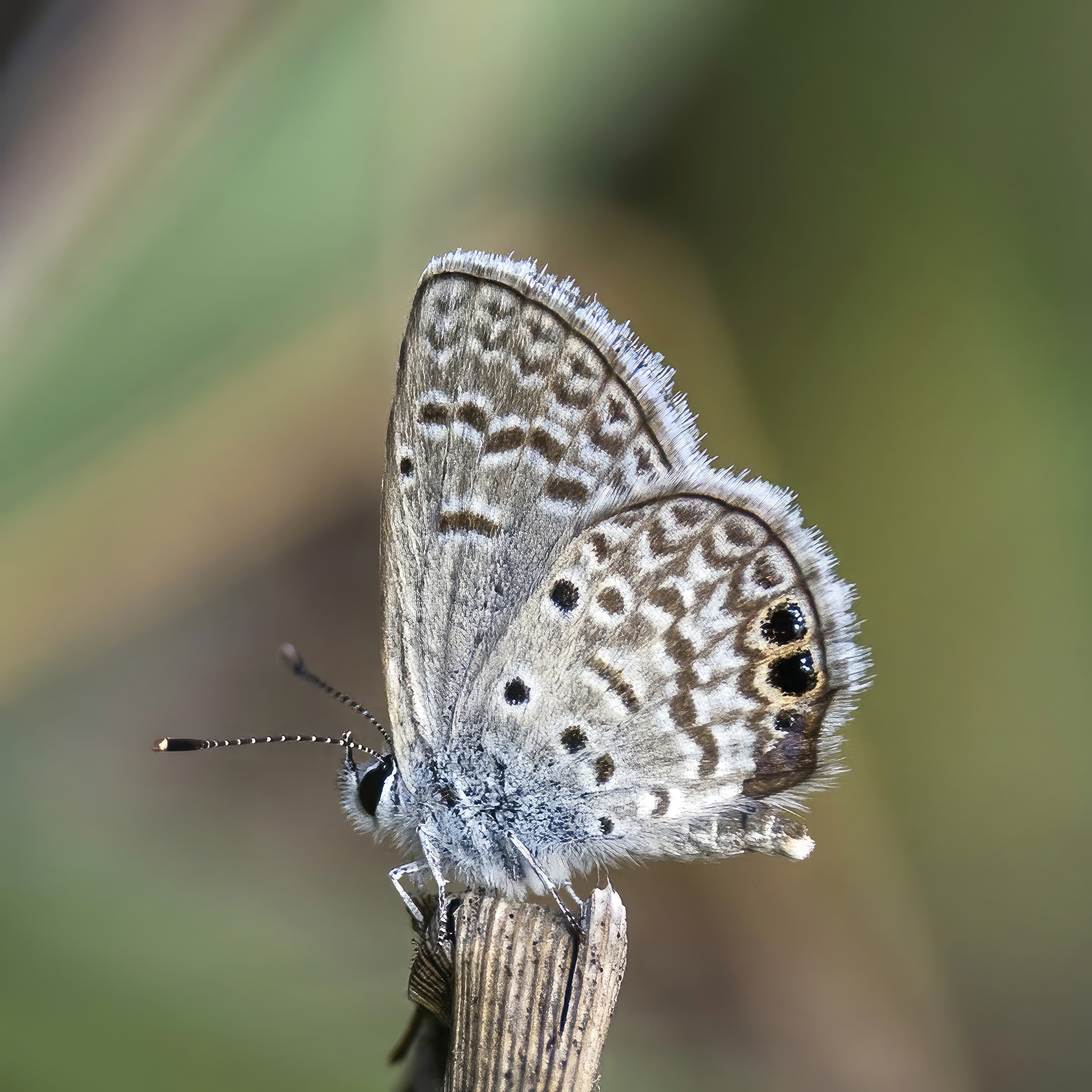
- Hemiargus ceraunus astenidas, Honduras

Conservation status
- Secure (NatureServe)

Scientific classification
- Kingdom: Animalia
- Phylum: Arthropoda
- Clade: Pancrustacea
- Class: Insecta
- Order: Lepidoptera
- Family: Lycaenidae
- Genus: Hemiargus
- Species: H. ceraunus

Binomial name
- Hemiargus ceraunus (Fabricius, 1793)

Synonyms
- List: Hesperia ceraunus Fabricius, 1793; Hemiargus hanno watsoni Comstock & Huntington, 1943; Hemiargus antibubastus Hübner, 1818; Argus pseudoptiletes Boisduval & Le Conte, [1835]; Lycaena ceraunus astenidas Lucas, 1857; Lampides zachaeina Butler & H. Druce, 1872; Lycaena gyas Edwards, 1871; Lycaena astragala Wright, 1905; Lycaena florencia Clémence, 1914

= Hemiargus ceraunus =

Ceraunus blue

Species of butterfly

Hemiargus ceraunus, the Ceraunus blue, is a species of butterfly in the family Lycaenidae. The species was first described by Johan Christian Fabricius in 1793. It is found in the southwestern United States, southern Texas, Florida and the Florida Keys south through the West Indies, Mexico and Central America to South America. Strays may be found in North Carolina, Missouri, Kansas and Nevada. The habitat consists of open woodland, desert scrub, dunes, pastures, road edges and vacant lots.

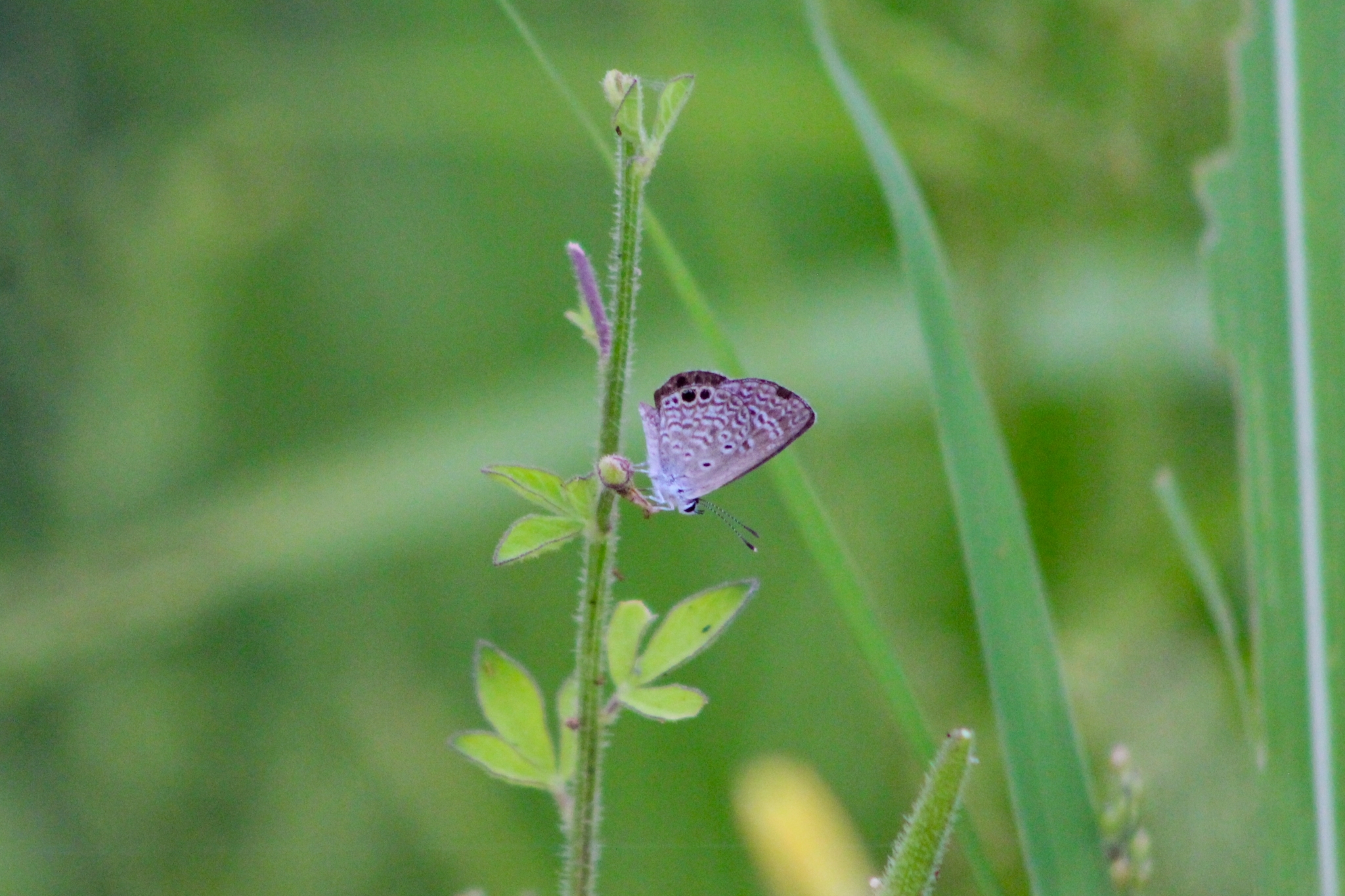
Hemiargus ceraunus gyas in Mexico

The wingspan is 20–30 mm. Adults are on wing year round in Texas and southern Florida and in late summer in other parts of the range. Adults feed on flower nectar.

The larvae feed on the flowers and seedpods of various woody legumes, including Chamaecrista fasciculata, Abrus precatorius and Prosopis species.

== Subspecies ==
- Hemiargus ceraunus antibubastus (Hübner, 1818) (Florida)
- Hemiargus ceraunus astenidas (Lucas, 1857) (Mexico, Costa Rica)
- Hemiargus ceraunus gyas (Edwards, 1871) (Arizona, California)
- Hemiargus ceraunus filenus (Poey, 1832) (Cuba)
