= Love in a Puff =

Love in a Puff may refer to:

- Love in a Puff (film), a 2010 Hong Kong film
- Cardiospermum halicacabum, a climbing plant also known as "love in a puff"
