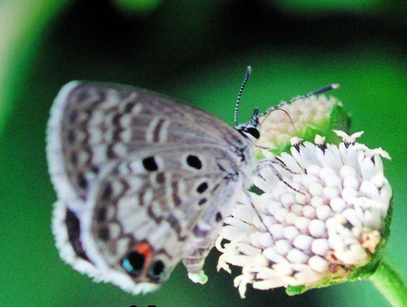
- Miami blue butterfly (Cyclargus thomasi bethunebakeri), Florida, U.S.A.

Conservation status
- Apparently Secure (NatureServe)

Scientific classification
- Kingdom: Animalia
- Phylum: Arthropoda
- Clade: Pancrustacea
- Class: Insecta
- Order: Lepidoptera
- Family: Lycaenidae
- Genus: Cyclargus
- Species: C. thomasi

Binomial name
- Cyclargus thomasi (Clench, 1941)

Synonyms
- Hemiargus catalina thomasi (Clench, 1941)

= Cyclargus thomasi =

Species of butterfly

Cyclargus thomasi, commonly known as Thomas's blue, Miami blue or Caribbean blue, is a species of butterfly in the family Lycaenidae. It is found in North America and the West Indies.

The subspecies C. t. bethunebakeri, which is found only in Florida, is known as the Miami blue.
