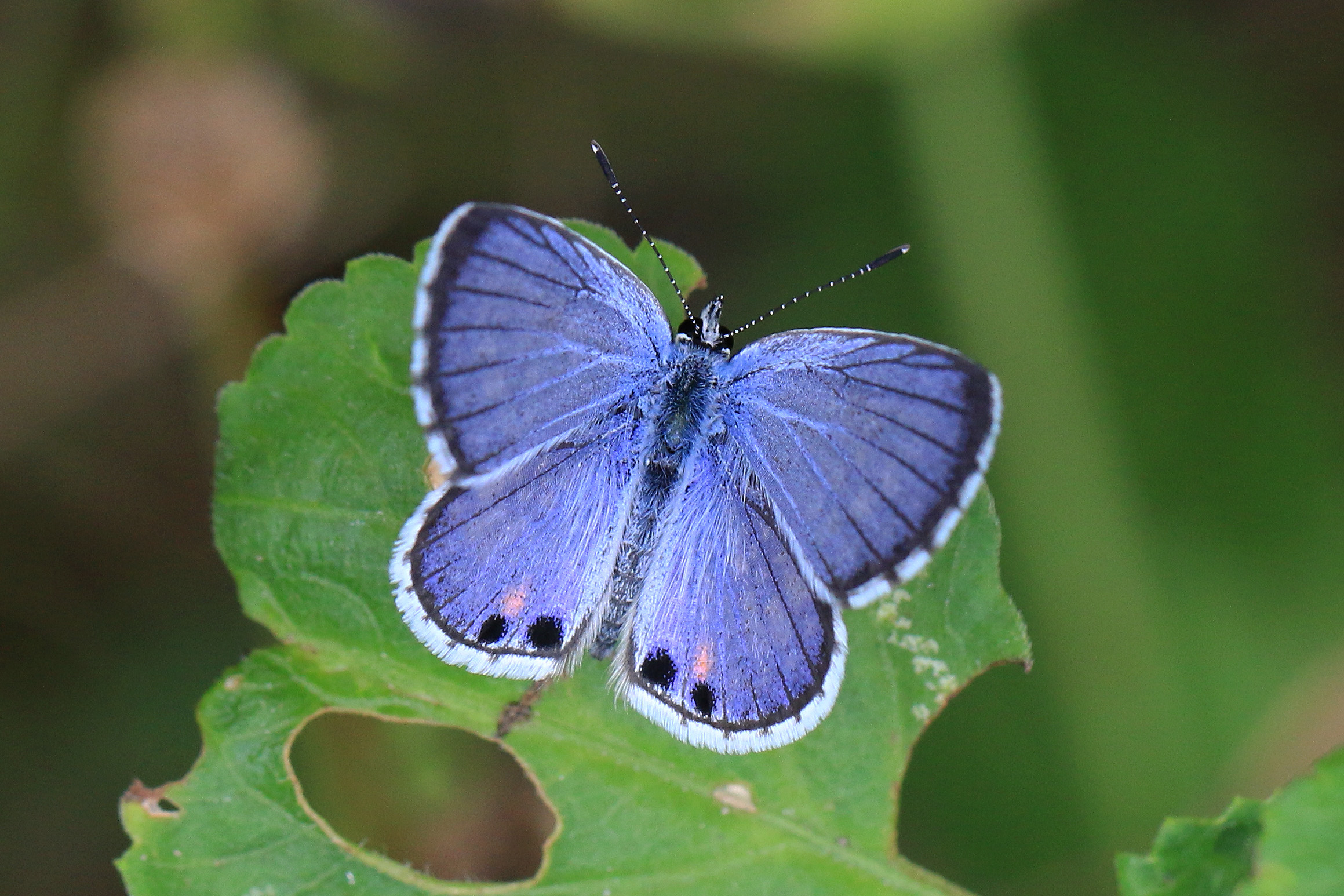

Scientific classification
- Domain: Eukaryota
- Kingdom: Animalia
- Phylum: Arthropoda
- Class: Insecta
- Order: Lepidoptera
- Family: Lycaenidae
- Genus: Cyclargus
- Species: C. ammon

Binomial name
- Cyclargus ammon (Lucas, 1857)

= Cyclargus ammon =

Species of butterfly

Cyclargus ammon, known generally as the nickerbean blue or Lucas' blue, is a species of blue in the butterfly family Lycaenidae. It is found in the Caribbean Sea and North America.

The MONA or Hodges number for Cyclargus ammon is 4358.1.

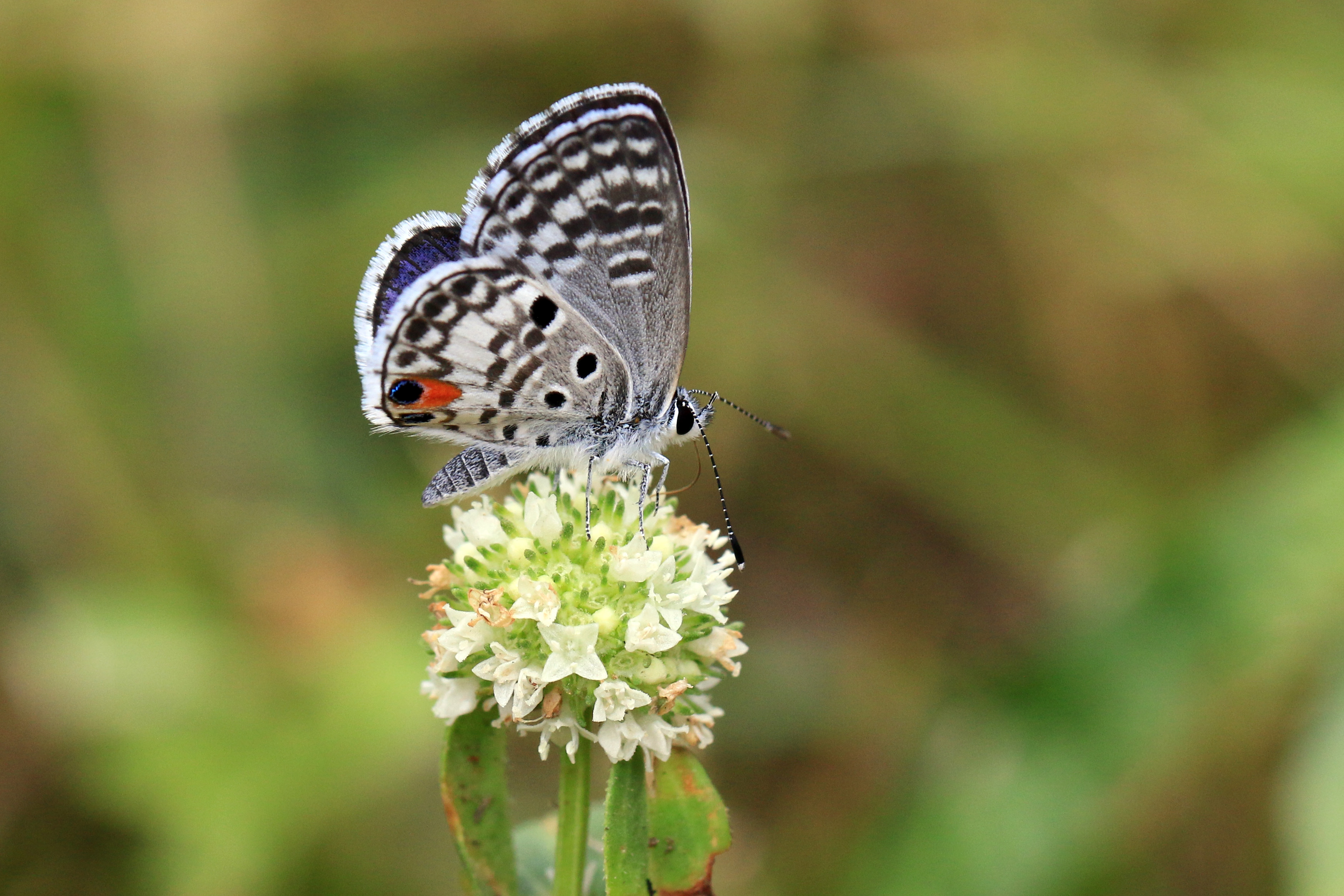
Nickerbean blue, Cyclargus ammon
