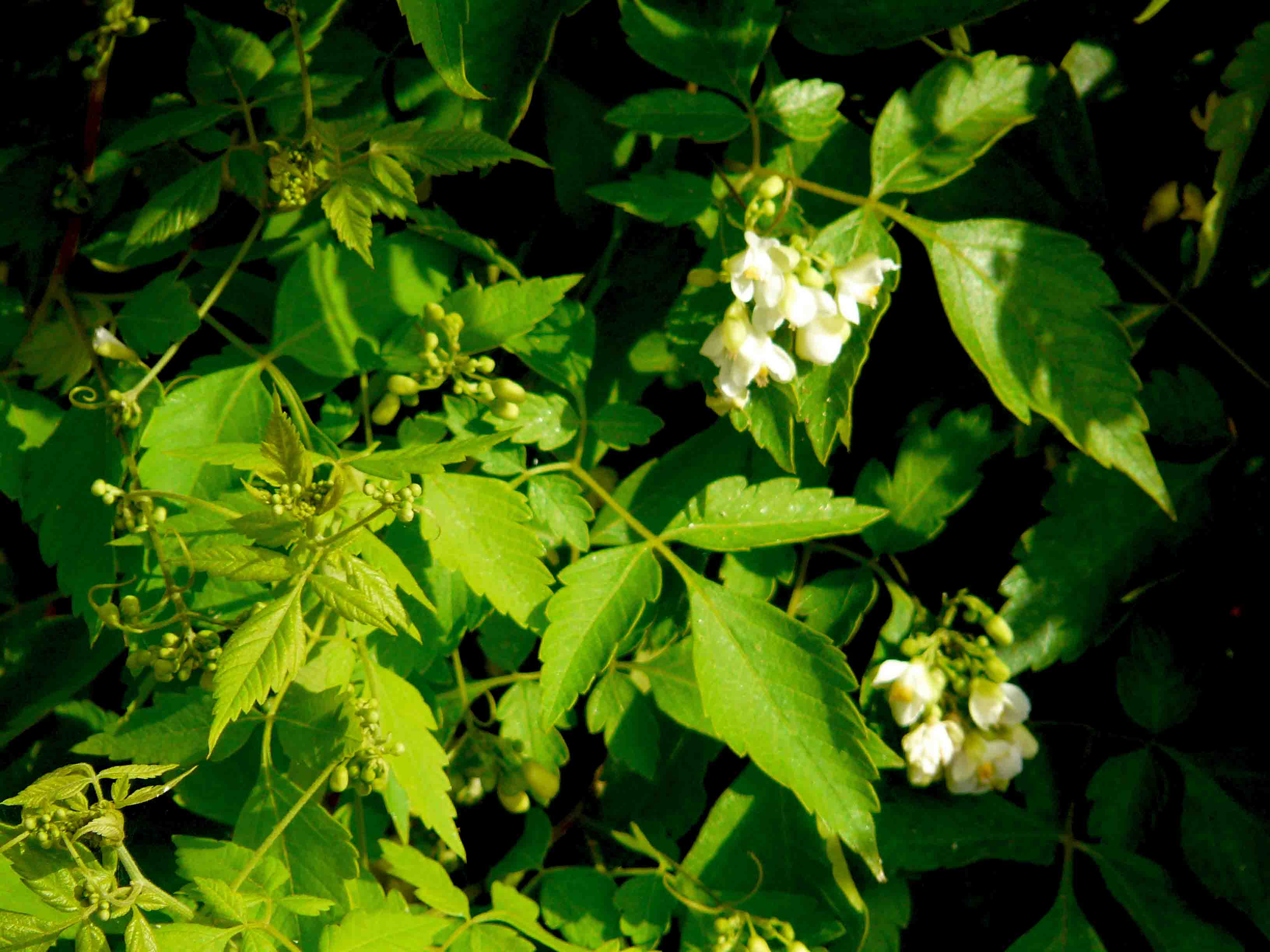

Scientific classification
- Kingdom: Plantae
- Clade: Embryophytes
- Clade: Tracheophytes
- Clade: Spermatophytes
- Clade: Angiosperms
- Clade: Eudicots
- Clade: Rosids
- Order: Sapindales
- Family: Sapindaceae
- Genus: Cardiospermum
- Species: C. grandiflorum

Binomial name
- Cardiospermum grandiflorum Sw.

Synonyms
- Cardiospermum barbicule Baker; Cardiospermum coluteoides Kunth; Cardiospermum duarteanum Cambess.; Cardiospermum elegans Kunth; Cardiospermum grandiflorum fo. elegans (Kunth) Radlk.; Cardiospermum grandiflorum fo. hirsutum (Willd.) Radlk.; Cardiospermum grandiflorum var. hirsutum Hiern; Cardiospermum hirsutum Willd.; Cardiospermum hispidum Kunth; Cardiospermum inflatum Vell.; Cardiospermum macrophyllum Kunth; Cardiospermum pilosum Vell.; Cardiospermum velutinum Hook. & Arn.; Cardiospermum vesicarium Humb.

= Cardiospermum grandiflorum =

Showy balloonvine

Species of flowering plant

Cardiospermum grandiflorum, commonly known as showy balloonvine, heart pea or heart seed, is a species of climbing plant native to eastern Argentina and Brazil.

== Taxonomy ==
It was described by Olof Swartz and is in the family Sapindaceae in his work Nova Genera & Species Plantarum seu Prodromus descriptionum Vegetabilium, maximam partem incognitorum quae sub itinere in Indiam Occidentalem annis 1783–87 (New genera and plant species, or Preliminary description of plants, mostly unknown, which were collected during a trip to East India in 1783–1787), written by him on the results of the expedition to the Caribbean.

== Description ==
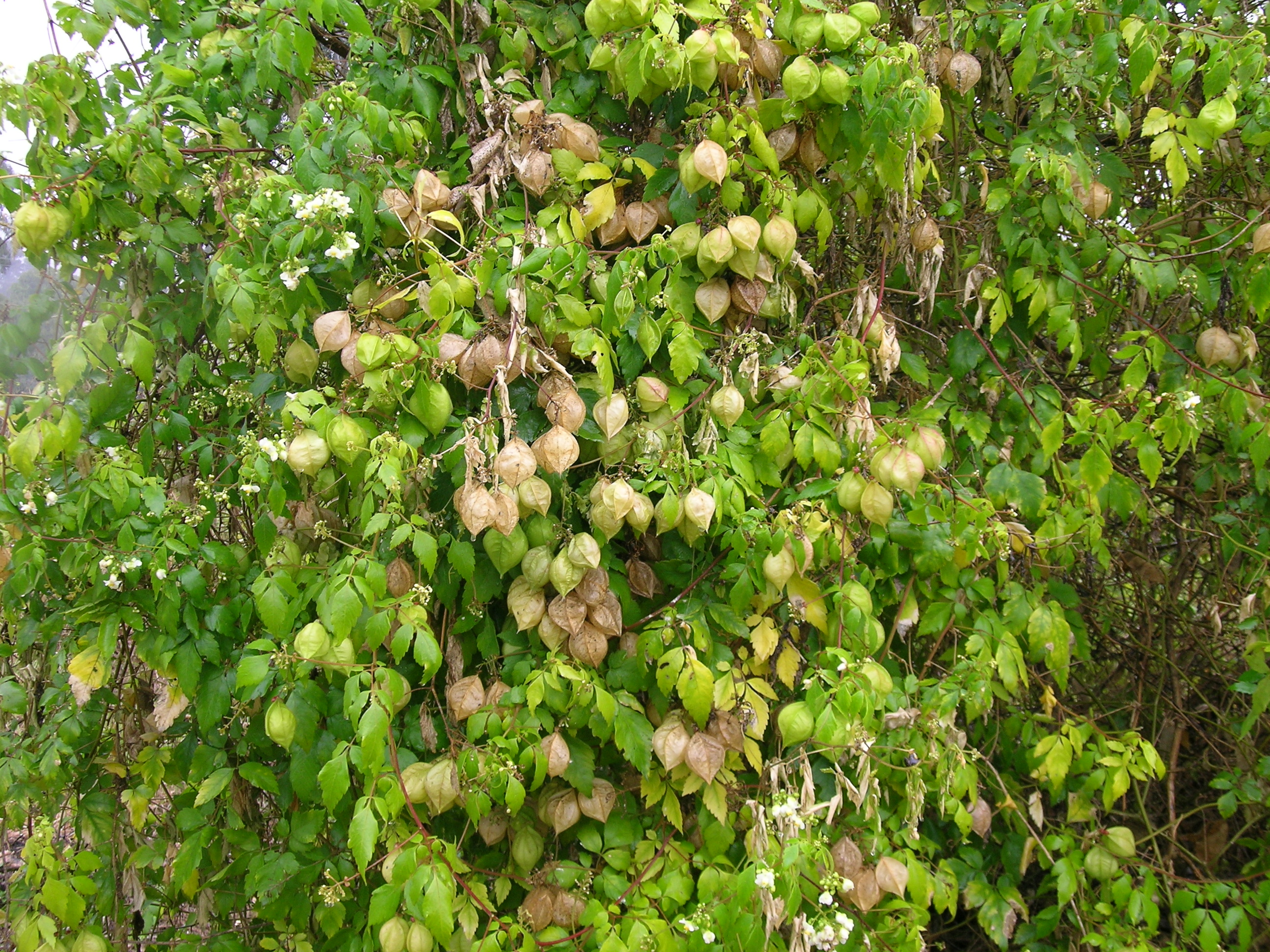
"Balloon" fruits

The species can grow over 10 m (33 ft) long and it has small white flowers. It is a herbaceous, evergreen, fast-growing liana with a tough stem that clings to the support with antennae. Leaves are compound, consisting of leaves with large teeth.

=== Inflorescence ===
The flowers are small, slightly fragrant, with creamy white petals. The fruit is a capsule, cracking into three parts when ripe. Seeds are black, hard, with a membranous wing. In warm climates, it reproduces by self seeding, as well as vegetatively, such as by root pieces.

=== Similar species ===
Cardiospermum grandiflorum is a large growing, semi-woody perennial, whereas Cardiospermum halicacabum is smaller in size, less woody and usually an annual. C. grandiflorum has larger fruit than the more compact fruit of C. halicacabum. A kidney-shaped hilum exists on C. halicacabum seeds and a round hilum on C. grandiflorum seeds. Furthermore, the leaves and stems of C. grandiflorum have small reddish hairs that are lacking in C. halicacabum, which additionally has smaller flowers than those of C. grandiflorum.

== Invasive species ==
Planted as an ornamental, it has been introduced to all continents except Antarctica, and is a dangerous invasive in places. The species has been added to the list of invasive alien species of Union concern since 2019. This means that the plant cannot be imported or sold anywhere in the European Union.

It is also a significant environmental weed in eastern New South Wales and south-eastern Queensland, where it is listed as a priority environmental weed in four Natural Resource Management regions. also on the New Zealand NPPA list of banned plants.

== Gallery ==
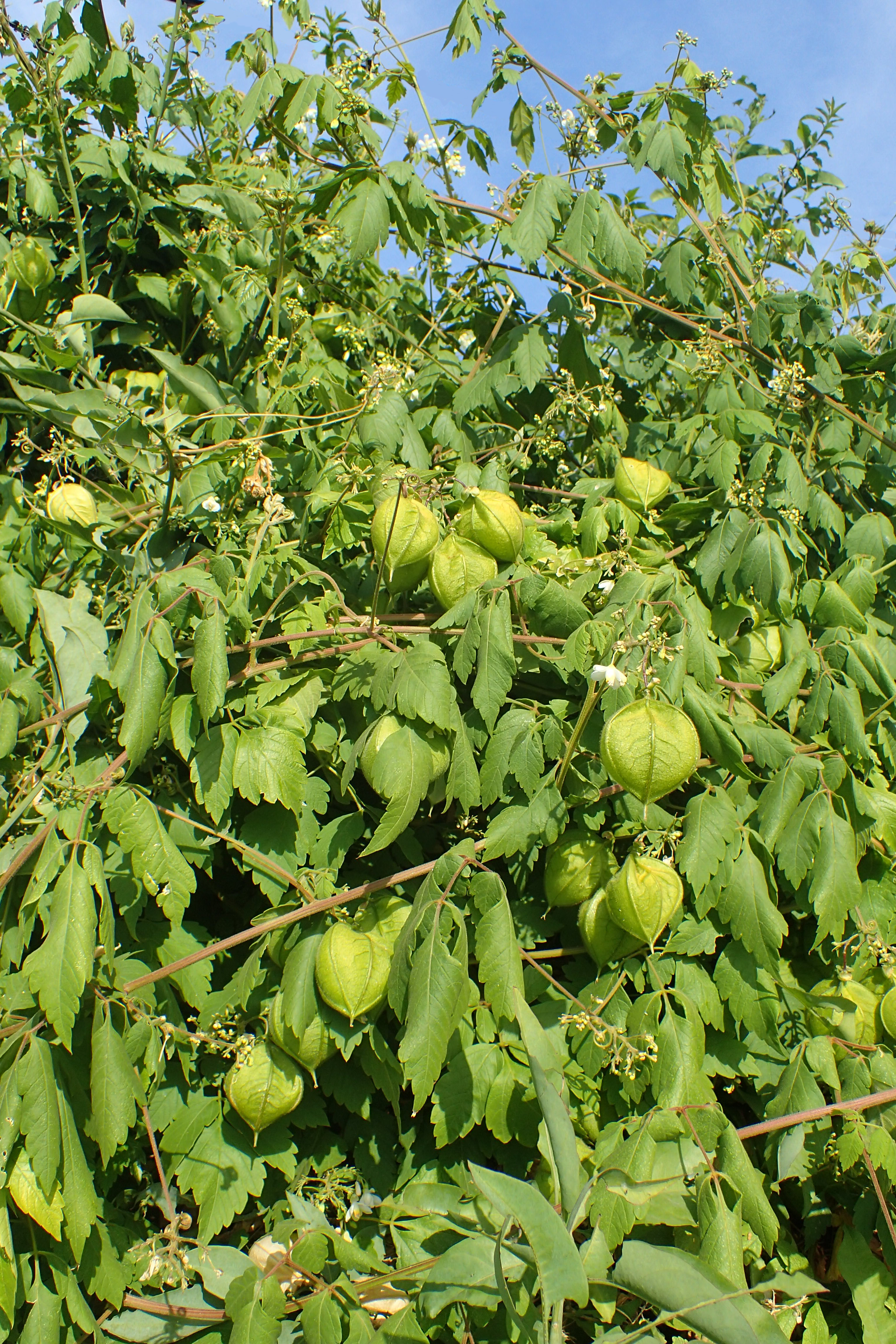
Leaves and fruit

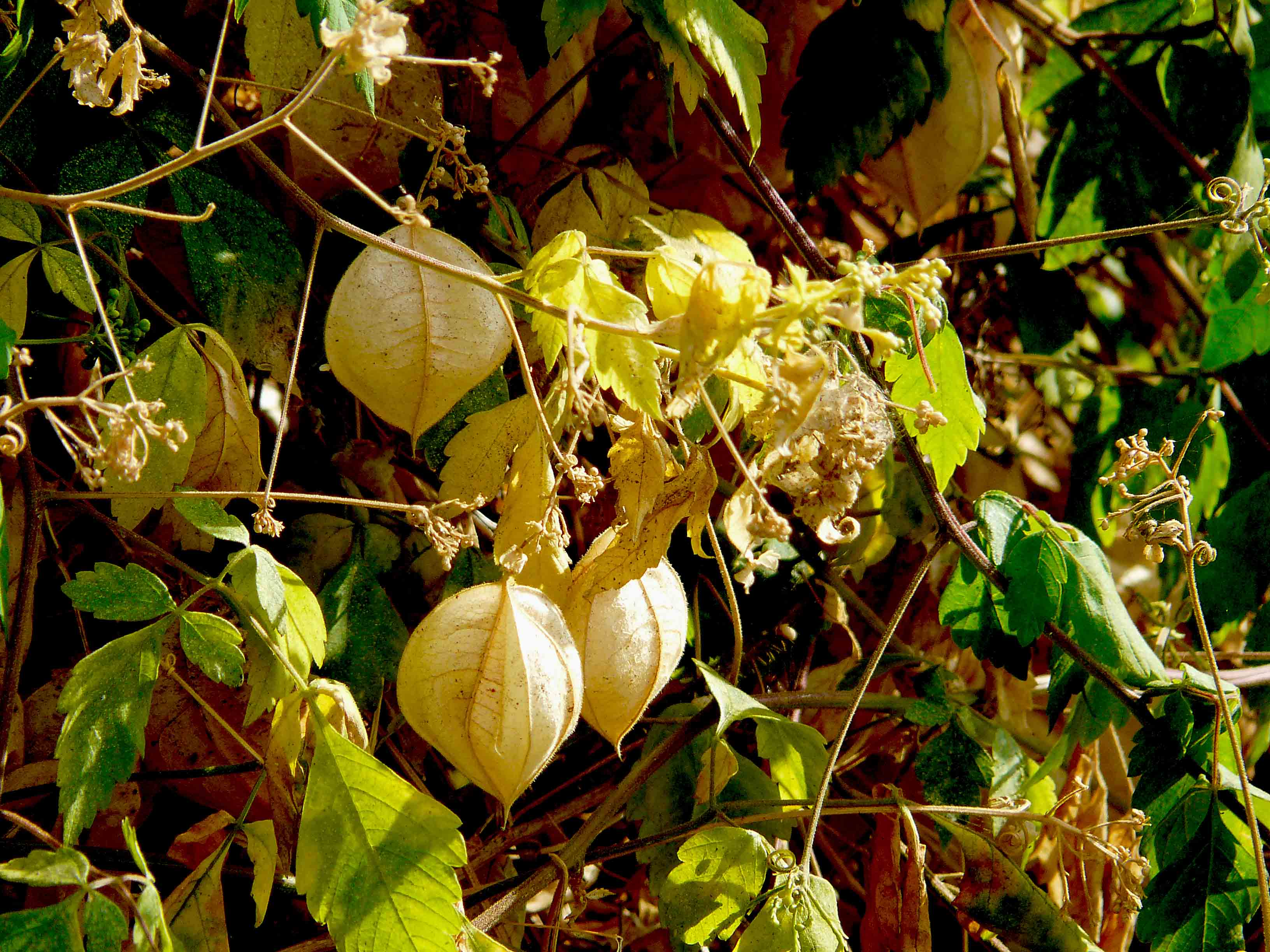
Fruit

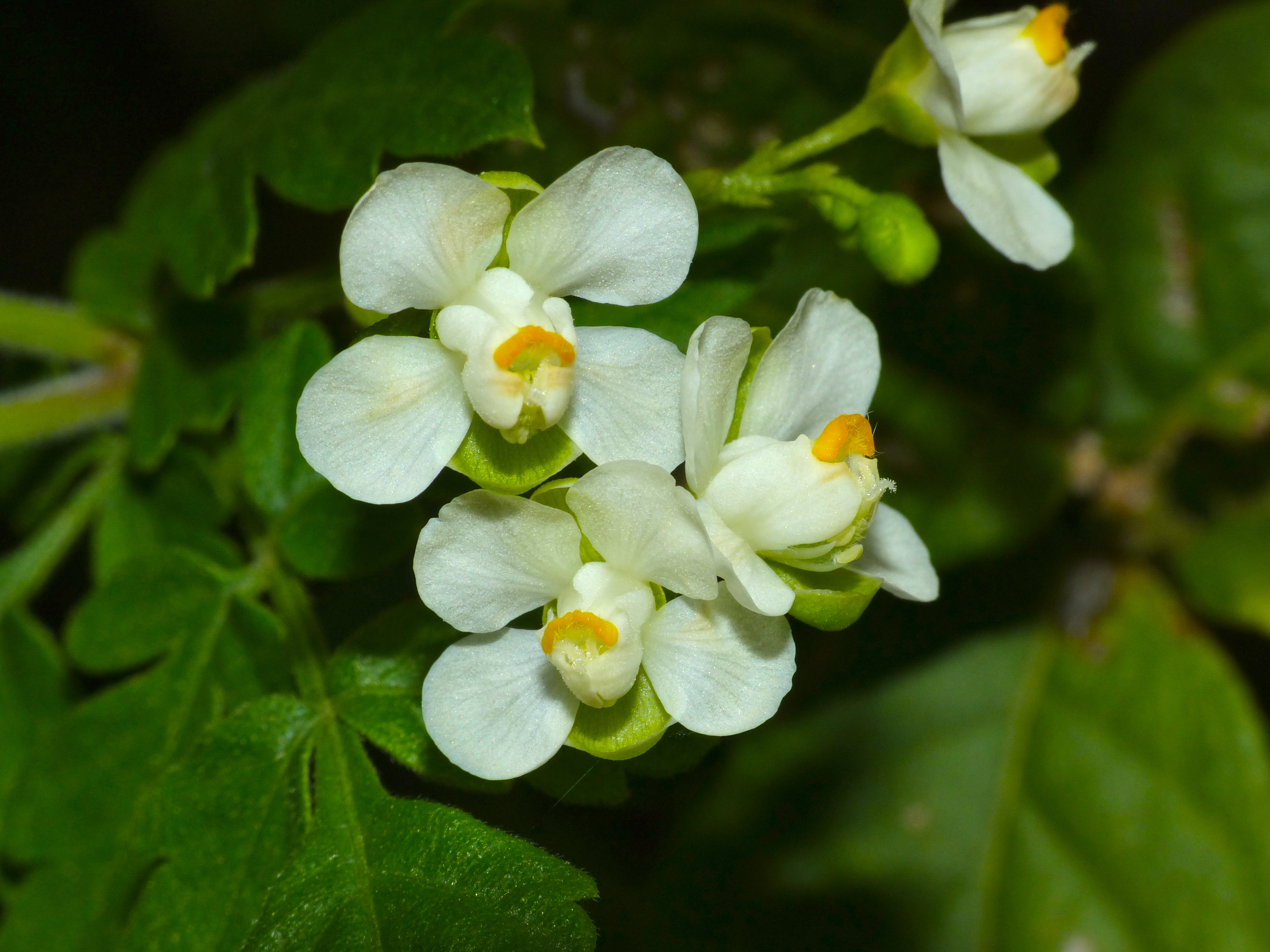
Flowers

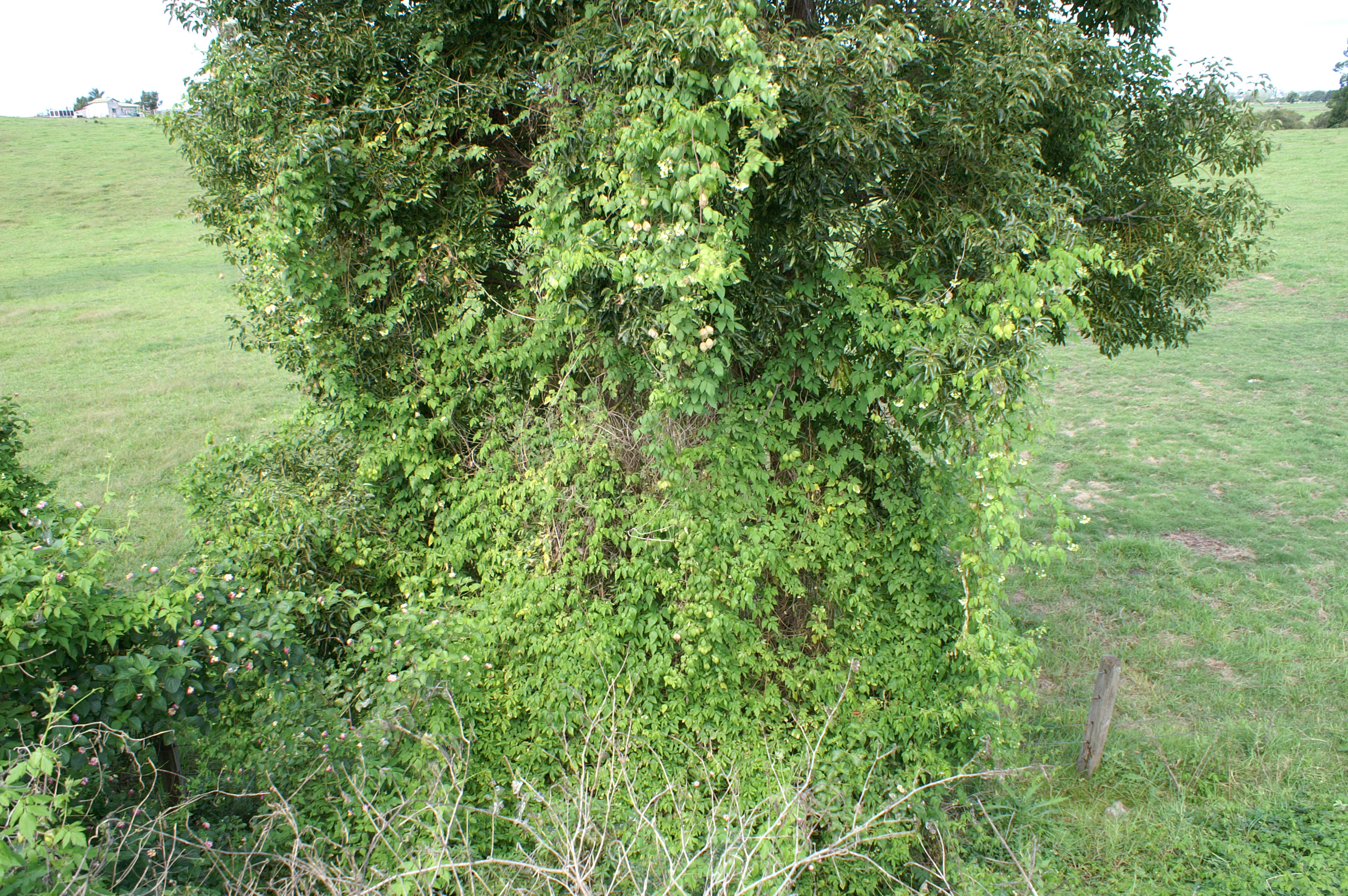
Growing vigorously on a tree

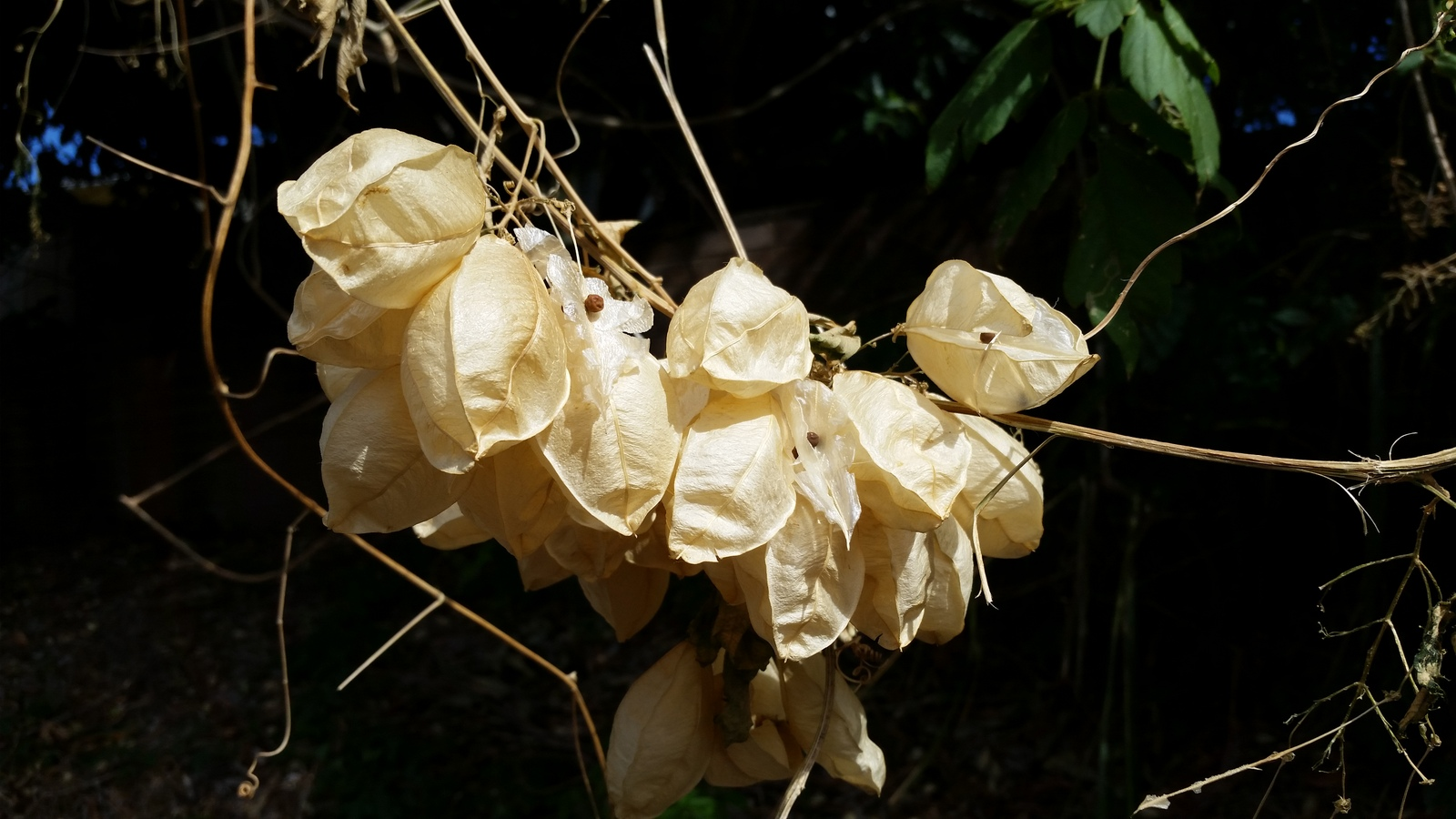
Seeds
