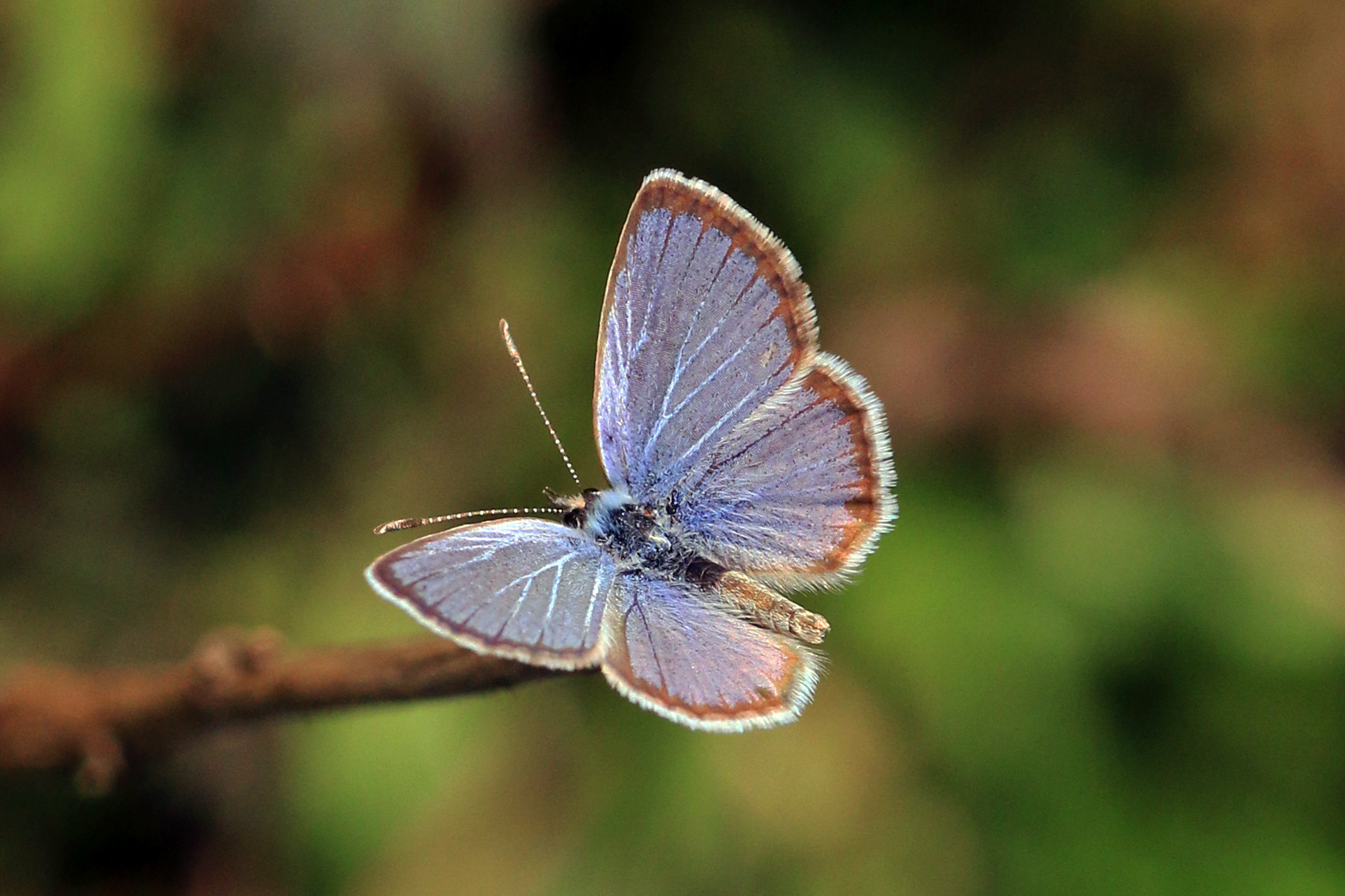
- Male H. h. filenus, Cuba
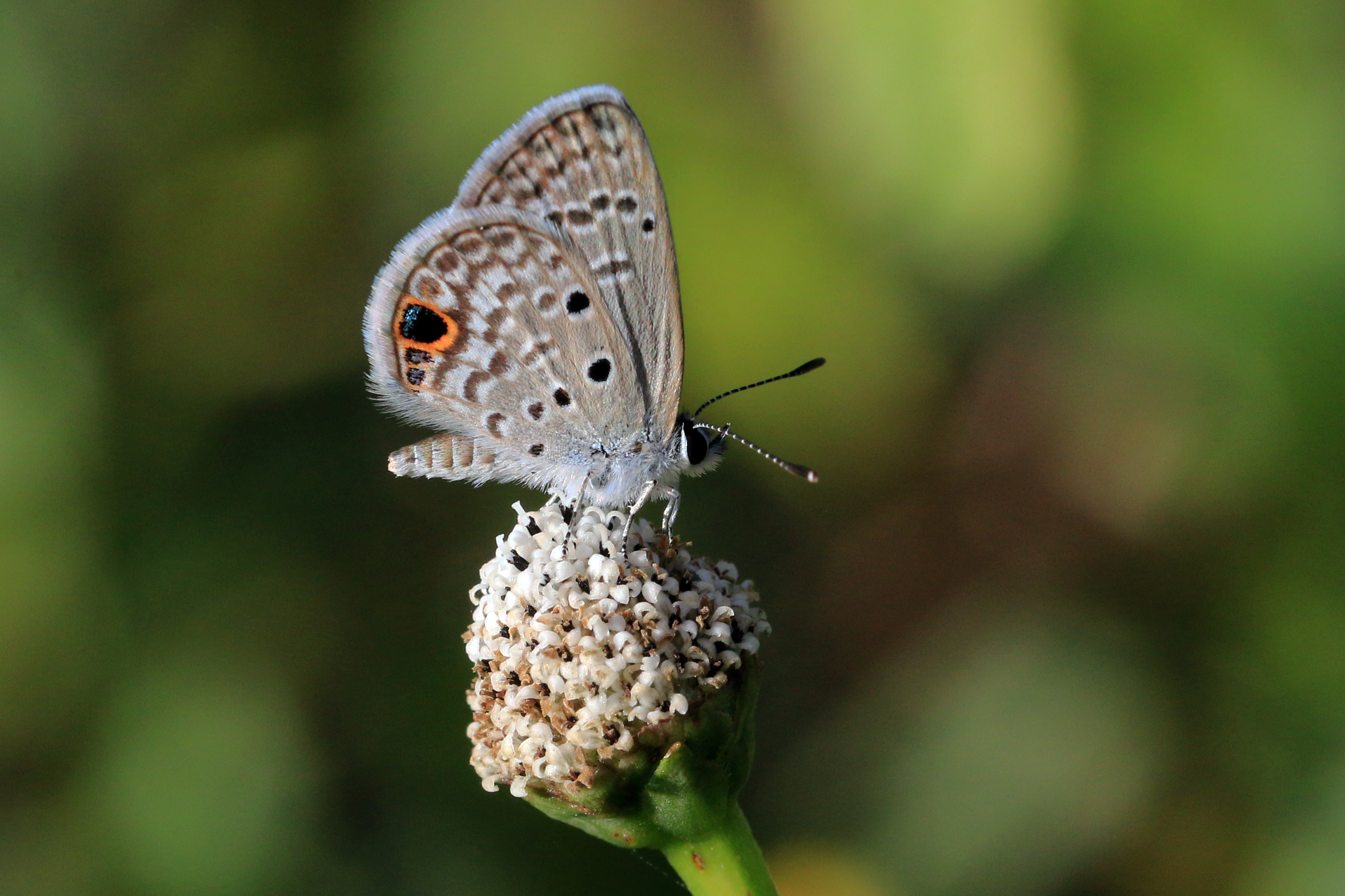
- Ventral side, H. h. filenus, Grand Cayman

Scientific classification
- Kingdom: Animalia
- Phylum: Arthropoda
- Clade: Pancrustacea
- Class: Insecta
- Order: Lepidoptera
- Family: Lycaenidae
- Genus: Hemiargus
- Species: H. hanno

Binomial name
- Hemiargus hanno (Stoll, [1790])

Synonyms
- Papilio hanno Stoll, [1790]; Lycaena hanno; Hemiagrus hanno; Polyommatus hanno filenus (Poey, 1832)

= Hemiargus hanno =

Species of butterfly

Hemiargus hanno, the hanno blue is a species of butterfly in the family Lycaenidae. It is found in Suriname, Brazil, Colombia, Cuba, the Netherlands Antilles, Puerto Rico and Hispaniola.

== Subspecies ==
- Hemiargus hanno hanno - Surinam, Brazil
- Hemiargus hanno bogotana Draudt, 1921 - Panama and Colombia
- Hemiargus hanno filenus (Poey, 1832) - Bahamas, Turks & Caicos, Cuba, Cayman Islands
