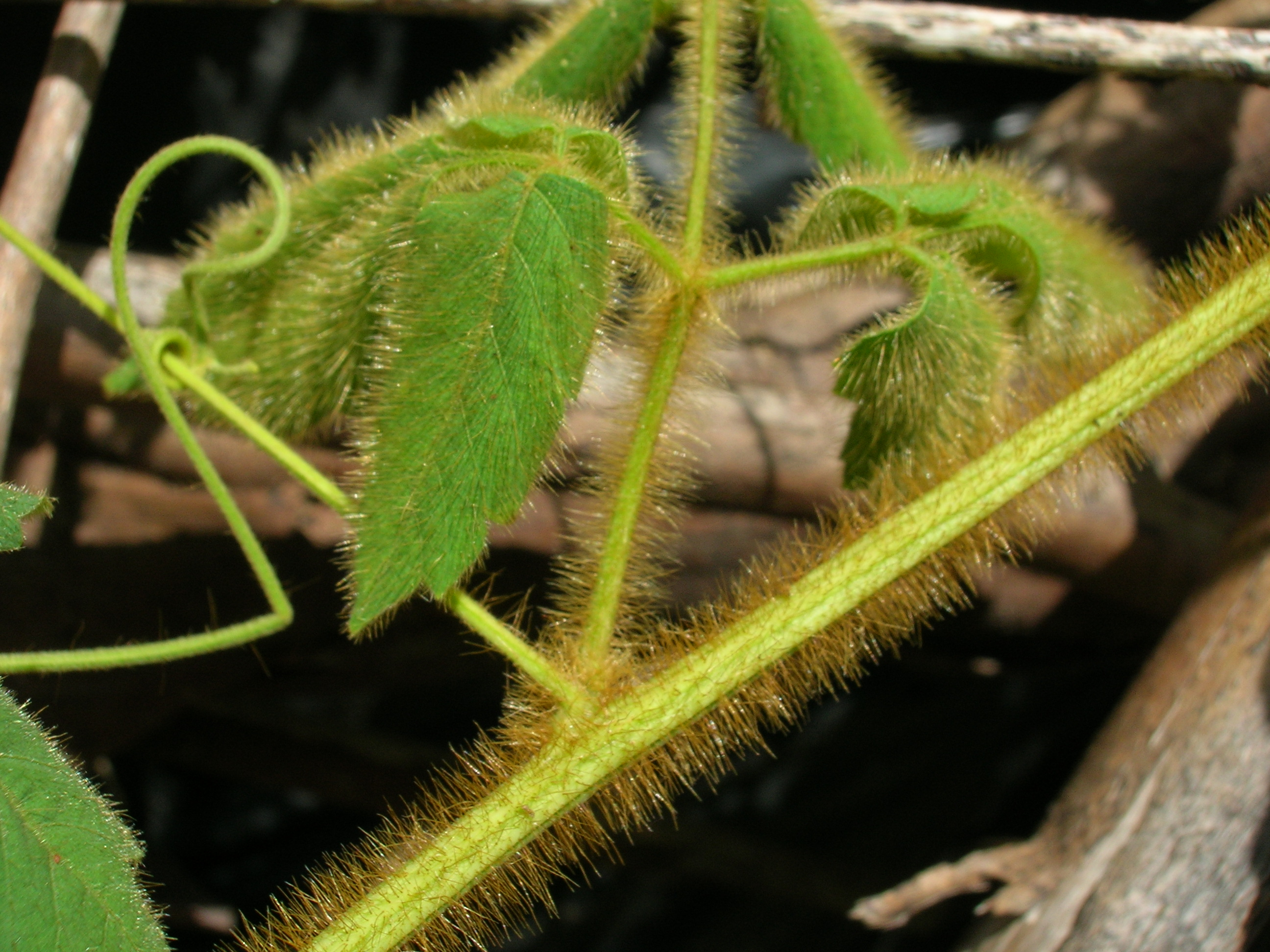
- Cardiospermum sp. vine

Scientific classification
- Kingdom: Plantae
- Clade: Tracheophytes
- Clade: Angiosperms
- Clade: Eudicots
- Clade: Rosids
- Order: Sapindales
- Family: Sapindaceae
- Subfamily: Sapindoideae
- Genus: Cardiospermum; L.

Species
- 14 species, see text

= Cardiospermum =

Genus of flowering plants

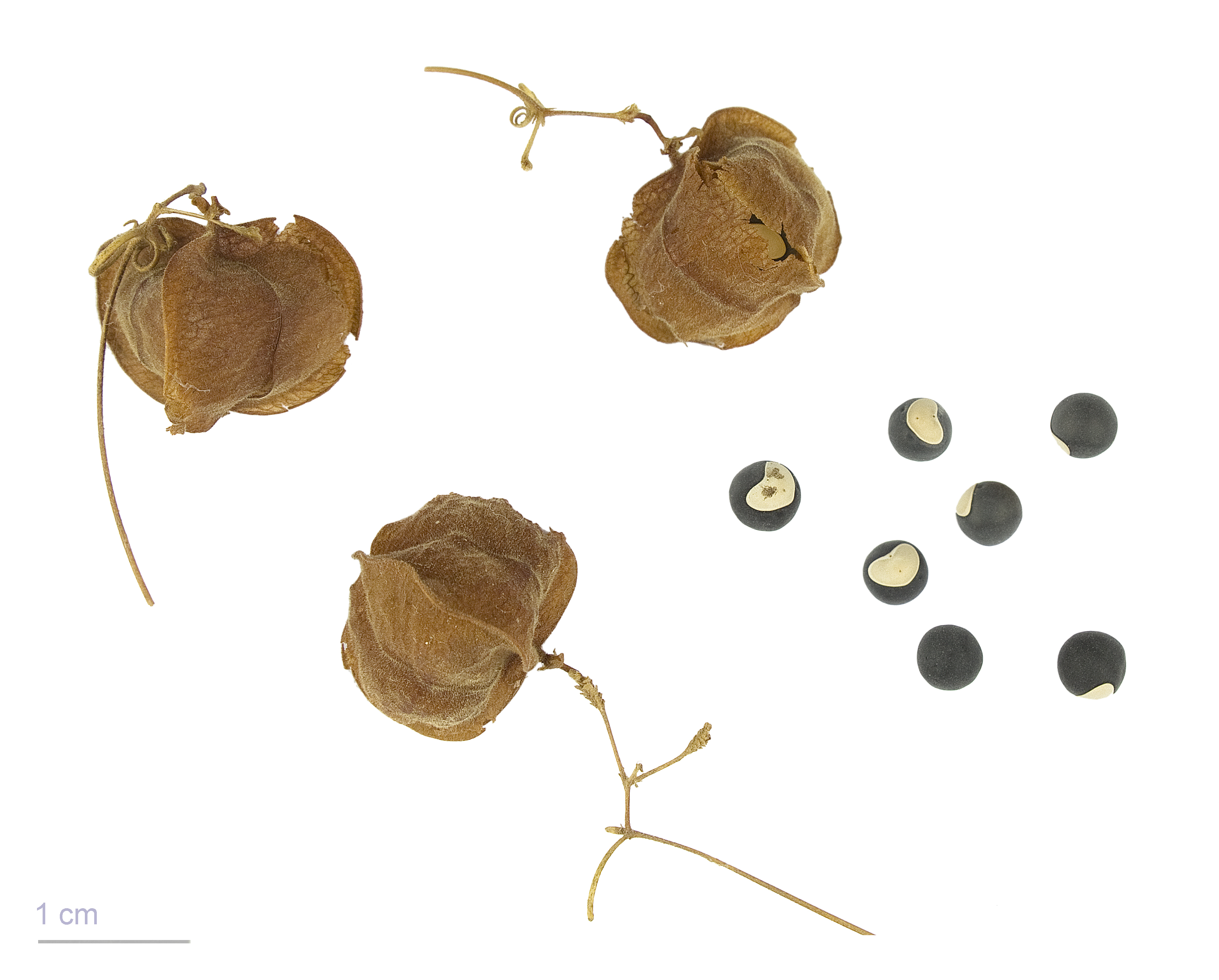
Cardiospermum halicacabum - MHNT

Cardiospermum is a genus of approximately 14 species in the soapberry family, Sapindaceae, which are native to the American, Indian, and African tropics. The genus name is derived from the Greek words καρδία, meaning "heart," and σπέρμα, meaning "seed." Common names of the members of this genus include balloon vine, love in a puff, heartseed, and heartseed vine. These plants are classified as invasive species in parts of the Southern United States and South Africa.

== Uses ==
The genus Cardiospermum consists primarily of herbaceous vines, which are cultivated in warm regions as ornamental plants. Extractions of Cardiospermum seed are included in skin creams that claim to treat eczema and other skin conditions.

== Species ==
Species include:

- Cardiospermum corindum
- Cardiospermum dissectum
- Cardiospermum grandiflorum
- Cardiospermum halicacabum
