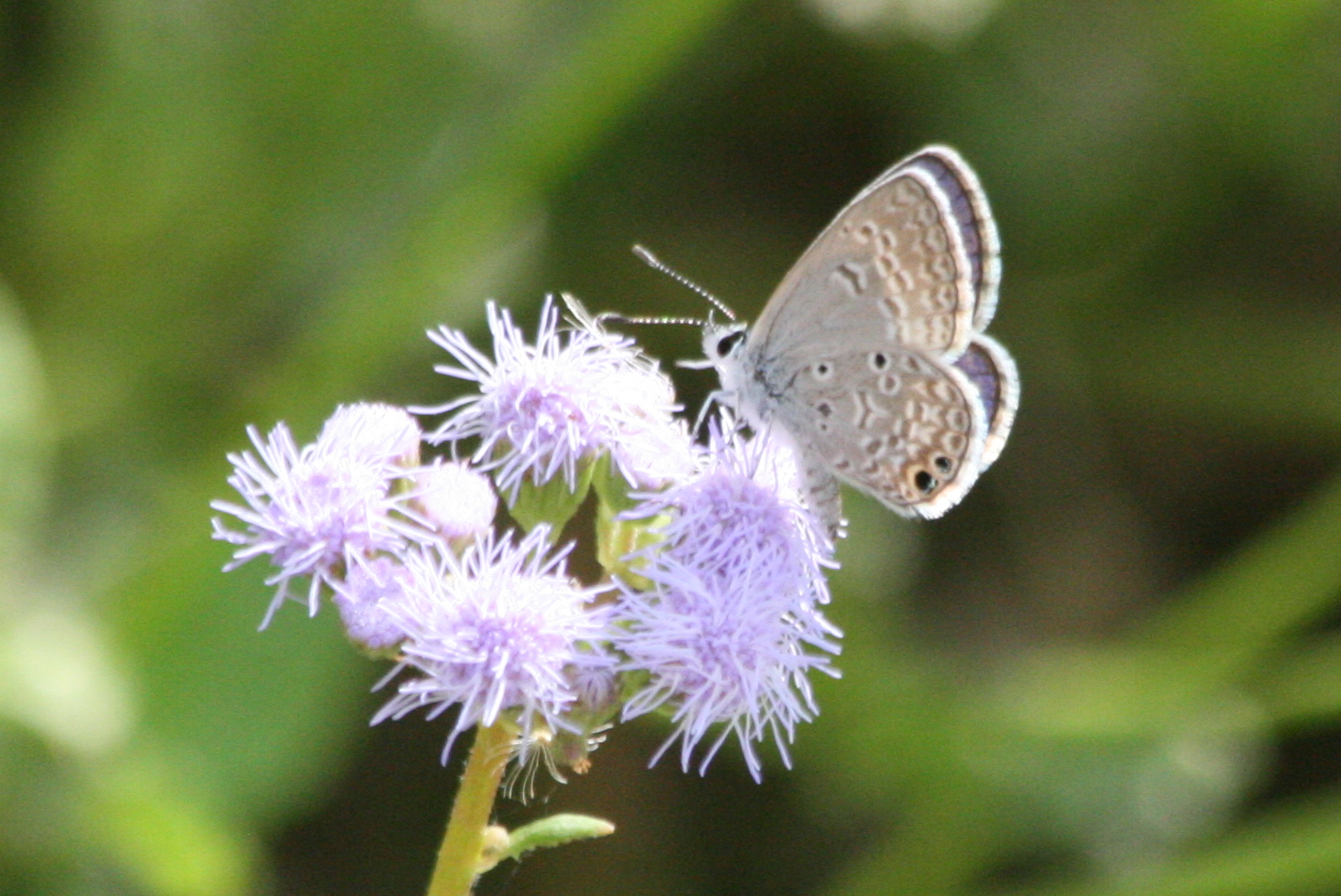
- Ceraunus blue (Hemiargus ceraunus)

Scientific classification
- Kingdom: Animalia
- Phylum: Arthropoda
- Clade: Pancrustacea
- Class: Insecta
- Order: Lepidoptera
- Family: Lycaenidae
- Subfamily: Polyommatinae
- Tribe: Polyommatini
- Genus: Hemiargus; Hübner, 1818

= Hemiargus =

Butterfly genus in family Lycaenidae

Hemiargus is a genus of butterflies in the family Lycaenidae found in North and South America.

== Species ==
Listed alphabetically:

- Hemiargus ceraunus (Fabricius, 1793) – Ceraunus blue
- Hemiargus hanno (Stoll, [1790])
- Hemiargus ramon (Dognin, 1887) – Ramon's blue
- Hemiargus huntingtoni Rindge & Comstock, 1953
- Hemiargus martha (Dognin, 1887)
