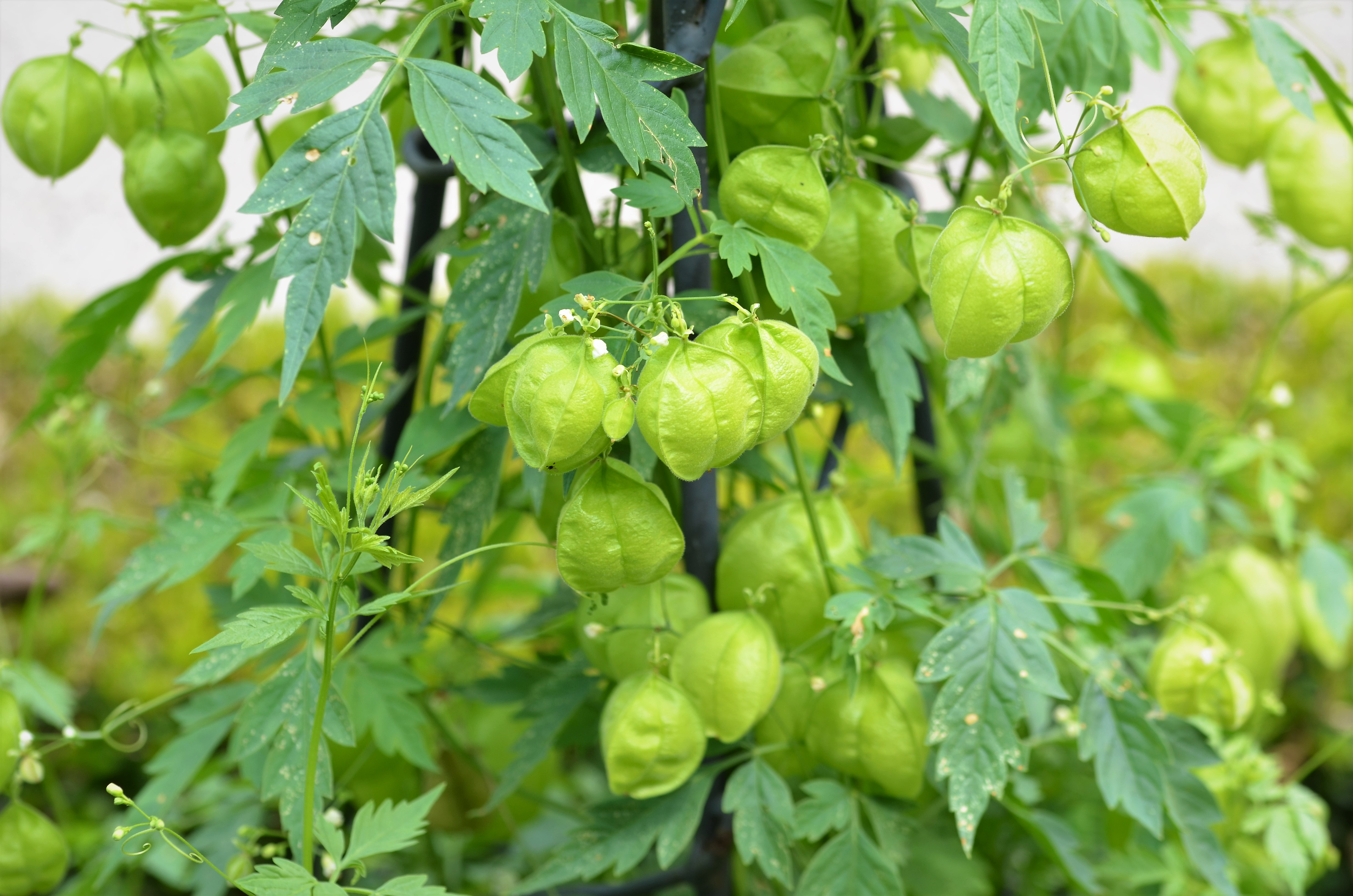

Scientific classification
- Kingdom: Plantae
- Clade: Embryophytes
- Clade: Tracheophytes
- Clade: Spermatophytes
- Clade: Angiosperms
- Clade: Eudicots
- Clade: Rosids
- Order: Sapindales
- Family: Sapindaceae
- Genus: Cardiospermum
- Species: C. halicacabum

Binomial name
- Cardiospermum halicacabum L.

Synonyms
- List: Cardiospermum acuminatum Miq.; Cardiospermum corycodes Kunze; Cardiospermum glabrum Schumach. & Thonn.; Cardiospermum inflatum Salisb.; Cardiospermum luridum Blume; Cardiospermum moniliferum Sw. ex Steud.; Corindum halicacabum (L.) Medik.; Physalis corymbosa Noronha; Physalis halicacabum Noronha; Rhodiola biternata Lour.

= Cardiospermum halicacabum =

Heartseed

Species of flowering plant

Cardiospermum halicacabum, known as the lesser balloon vine, balloon plant, love in a puff, or heartseed, is a climbing plant widely distributed across tropical and subtropical areas of Africa, Australia, South Asia and North America that is often found as a weed along roads and rivers.

== Names ==
The 1889 book The Useful Native Plants of Australia records that other common names for Cardiospermum halicacabum were "heart seed", "heart pea", or "winter cherry". It is one among the "Ten Sacred Flowers of Kerala", collectively known as dasapushpam.

The generic name Cardiospermum, which translates to "heart seeds", was given due to its large, black seeds, the white mark of which is reminiscent of a stylized heart. The specific epithet halicacabum comes from the Greek word for salt barrel and refers to the inflated fruits, after which the common name balloon vine is derived.

Mudakathan (முடகத்தான்) in Tamil means "clears rheumatism".

== Description ==
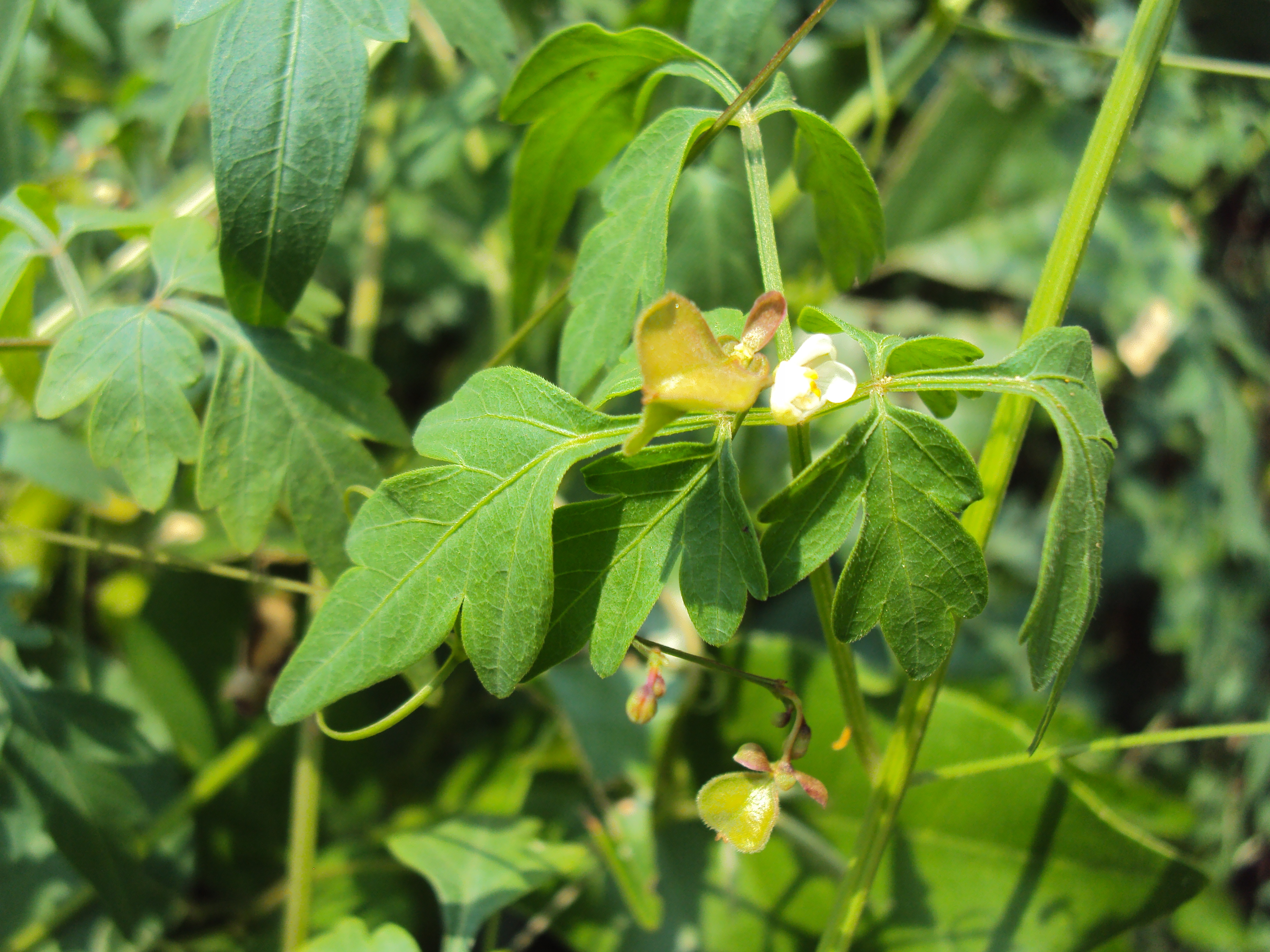
Leaves and flowers

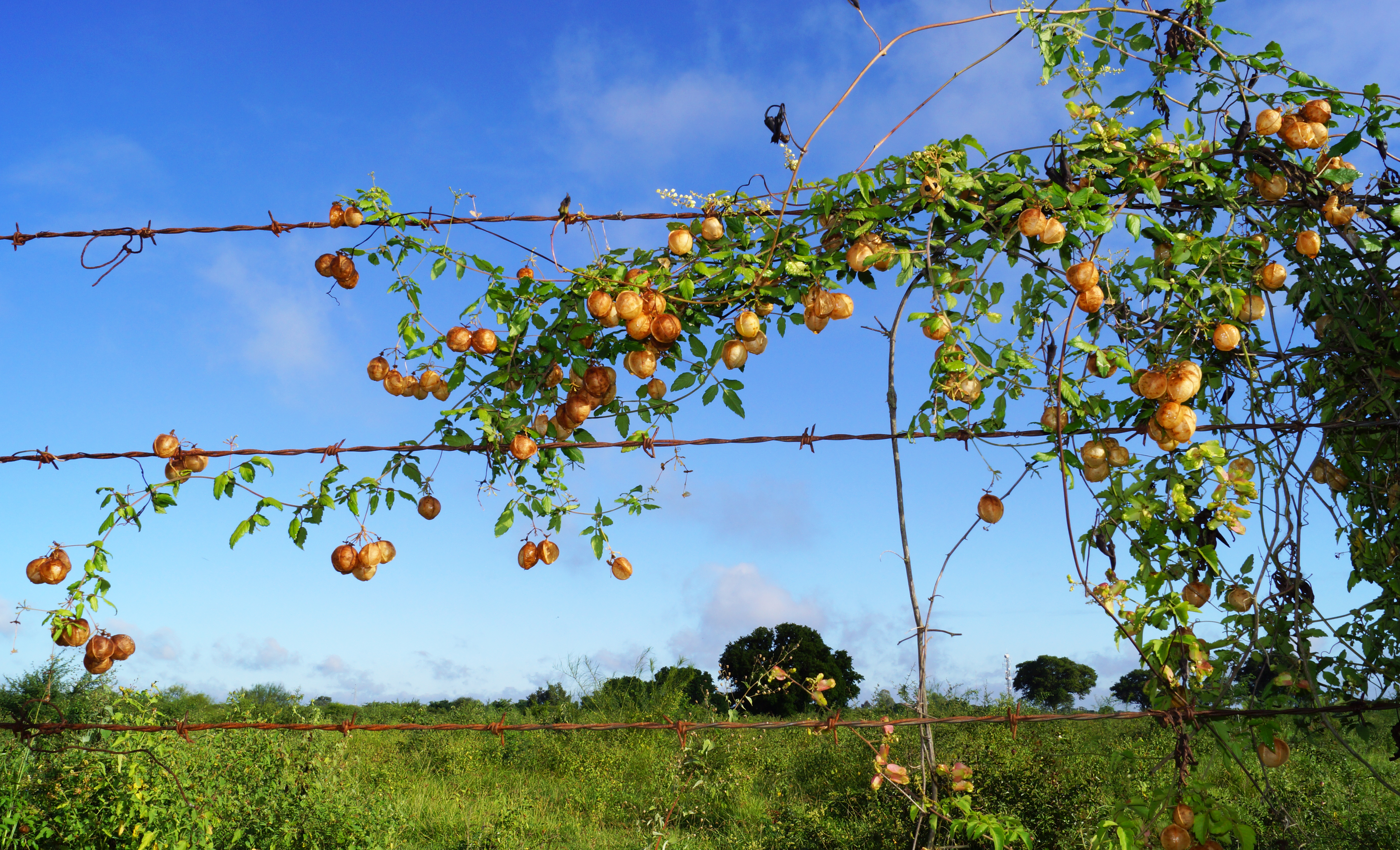
Fruit 'balloons'

The balloon vine is a strongly overgrown, perennial herbaceous climbing plant that can even become lignified at the base. Growing over 10 meters high, it can bloom at a height of around 25 cm. The slender, grooved stems are hairy bald to sparsely downy.

The 5 to 6 cm long, triangular foliage leaves distributed on the stem are divided into a petiole and pinnate leaf blade. The petiole is (0.5 to) 1.5 to 3.5 cm long and the rachis is 0.4 to 2 cm long. The opposite leaflets are 1 to 2 cm long and the terminal leaflets are 4 to 6 cm long. The leaf margins are serrated. The stipules are reduced to tiny, early-falling scales. On the side of a 5 to 9 cm long, sparsely downy hairy inflorescence stem, there are two 1 mm long bracts, two circularly rolled tendrils and three to seven flowers in a zymous inflorescence.

=== Flowers and fruit ===
The functionally unisexual flowers are zygomorphic and fourfold double perianth. Of the four free, concave, durable sepals, the outer two are circular, 2 mm long and ciliate, while the inner two are oblong-ovate, 3 to 4 mm long and glabrous. The four white to yellowish petals are obovate and about 3 mm long, the upper two are each adorned with woolly scales and the lower two have large, leaf-shaped scales and two glands.

In the male flowers are two circles with four free stamens each and rudimentary stamps present. The compressed stamens are hairy and about 2 mm long and the anthers are about 0.5 mm long. In the female flowers are obovate, 2 to 3 mm long and hairy, insulated draft tube ovary with a short fluffy hairy stylus, which ends in a three-part scar and eight staminodes present.

The conspicuous, membranous, almost spherical or broad pear-shaped capsule fruits have a diameter of 3 to 5 cm, initially fluffy hairy, light green "balloons" brown when ripe. There is only one seed in each of the three fruit chambers. A noticeable feature of the individual seeds is a large, light heart-shaped spot on the otherwise almost black seed. The kidney-shaped seeds have a diameter of about 6 mm and at their base a white, heart-shaped aril about 5 mm wide.

=== Similar species ===
Cardiospermum grandiflorum, being very similar to C. halicacabum, is a large growing, semi-woody perennial, whereas C. halicacabum is smaller in size, less woody and usual an annual plant. C. grandiflorum also features larger fruit than the more close-packed fruit of C. halicacabum. A kidney-shaped hilum exists on C. halicacabum seeds and a round hilum on C. grandiflorum seeds. Furthermore, the leaves and stems of C. grandiflorum have small reddish hairs that lack in C. halicacabum. Lastly, C. grandiflorum has larger flowers than those of C. halicacabum.

== Medicinal uses ==
The 1989 book records that “The root is diuretic and demulcent. It is mucilaginous, but has a nauseous taste, and is used to treat rheumatism. Sanskrit writers describe the root as emetic, laxative, stomachic, and rubefacient; they prescribe it in rheumatism, nervous diseases, piles, etc. The leaves are used in amenorrhoea. Rheede says that on the Malabar coast the leaves are administered for pulmonic complaints. It is also used in homeopathy to treat eczematic skin. For this purpose, a mother tincture is made from the flowering parts of the plant. This is also processed into creams and ointments. The green parts of the plant are eaten as vegetables.

According to Ainslie, the root is considered laxative, and is given in dosages of half a cupful twice daily. “It would appear that in rheumatism the Hindus [sic.] administer the leaves internally rubbed up with castor-oil, and also apply a paste, made with them, externally; a similar external application is used to reduce swellings and tumours of various kinds.” (Dymock.)

Its ingredients include triterpene saponins, halicaric acid, catechin tannins, terpenes, phytosterols, flavonoids and quebrachitol.

== Invasive plant ==
In New Zealand it is listed on the National Pest Plant Accord which identifies pest plants that are prohibited from commercial propagation and distribution. In Bermuda it is listed as a Category 1 Invasive Plant by the Department of Environment and Natural Resources. Within the United States, four southern states (Alabama, Arkansas, South Carolina, and Texas) have all placed this plant on their individual noxious weed lists. It is a noxious weed in New South Wales, Australia, where it should be controlled according to the measures specified in a management program published by the local control authority and it must not be sold in some local government areas in the state.

== Gallery ==
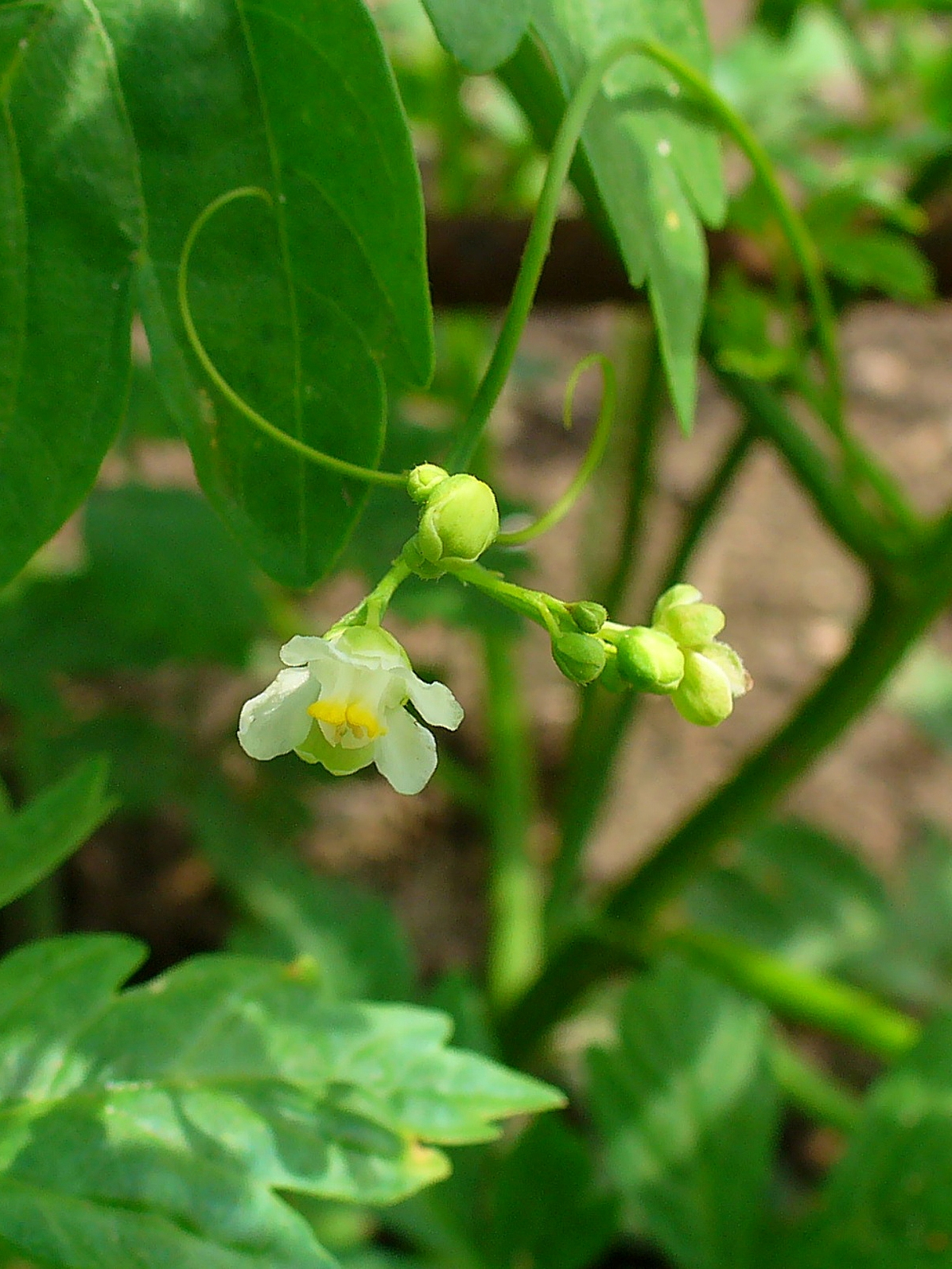
Flower

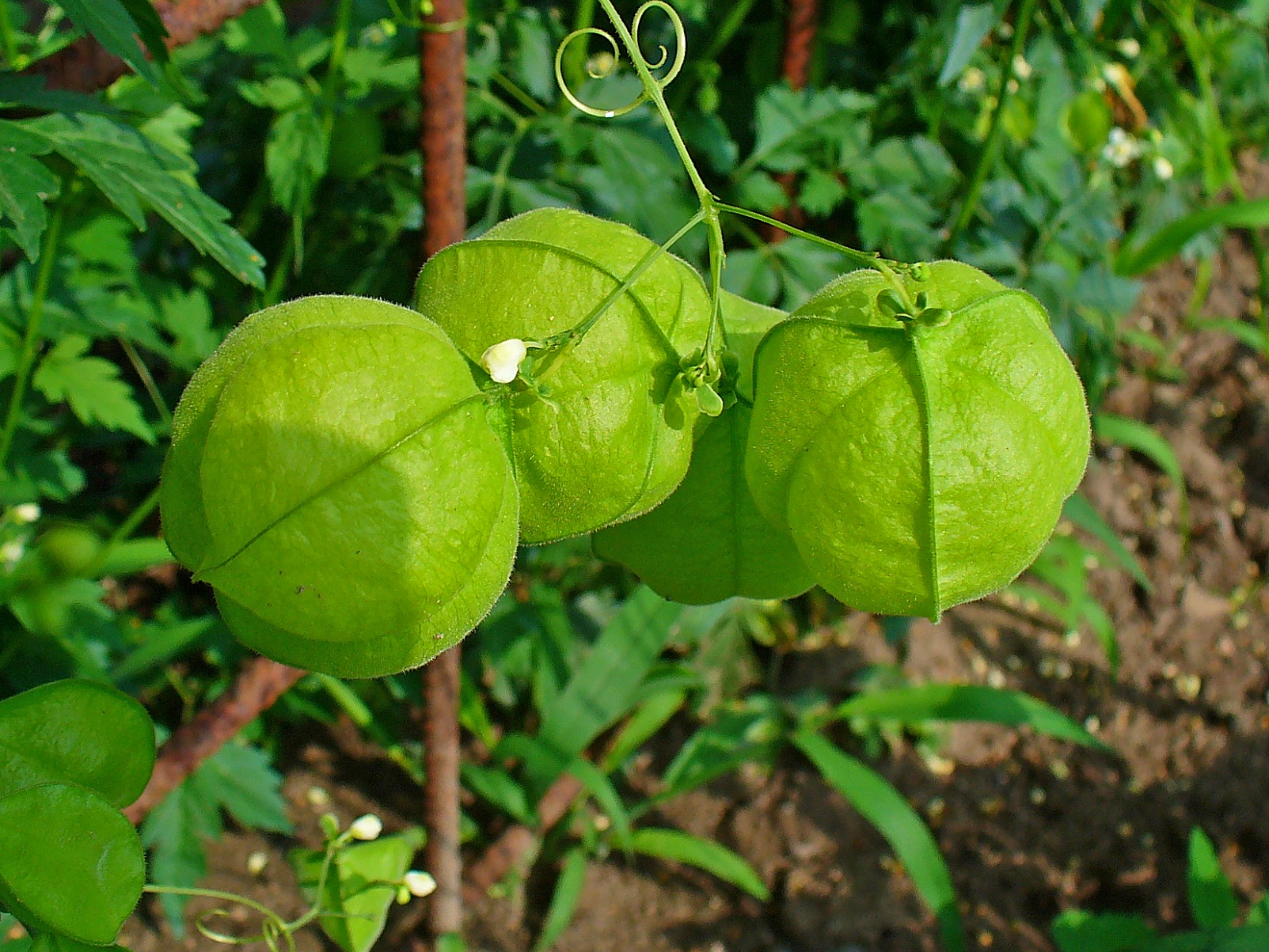
Unripe fruits

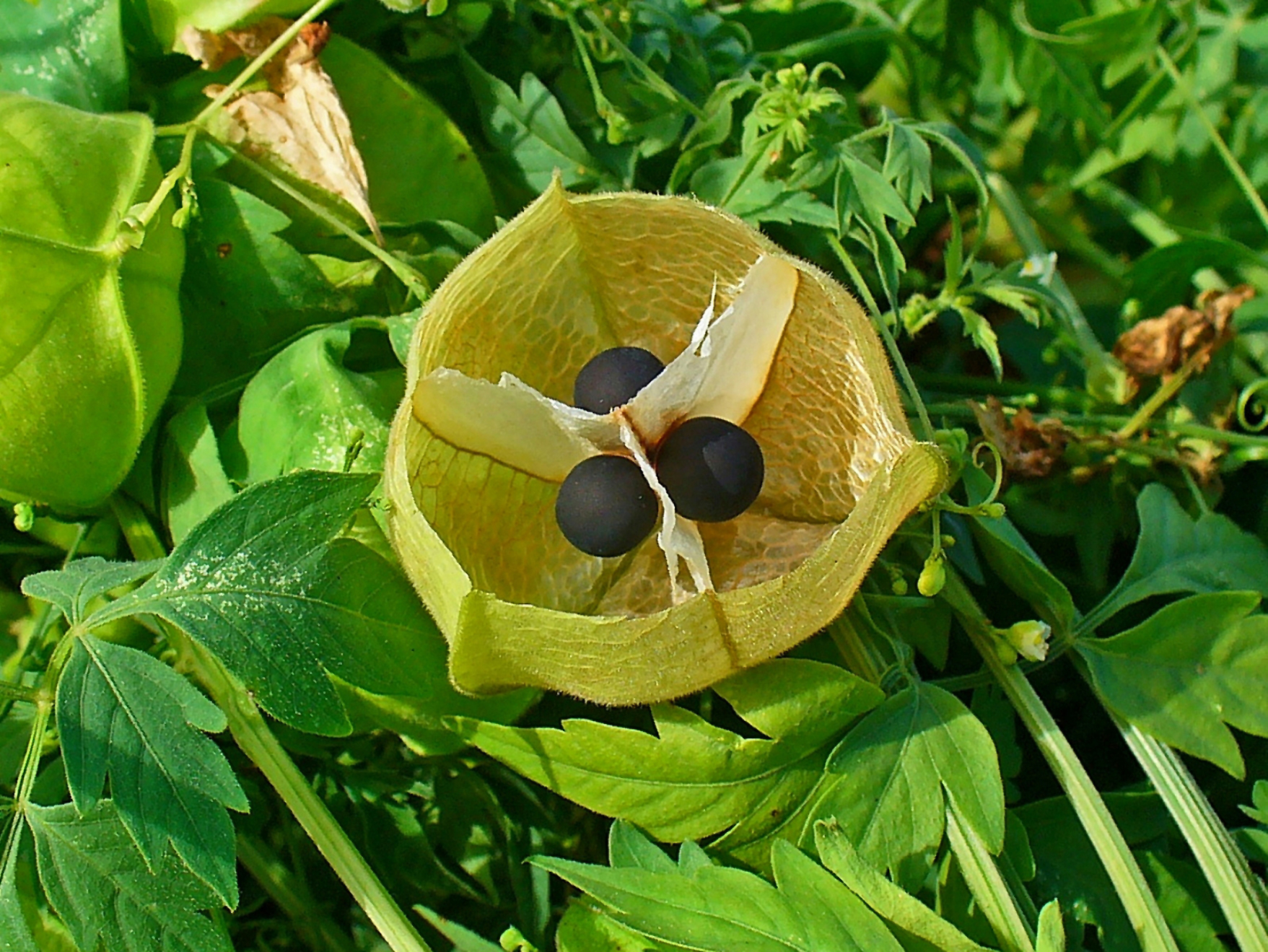
Opened fruit showing seed arrangement

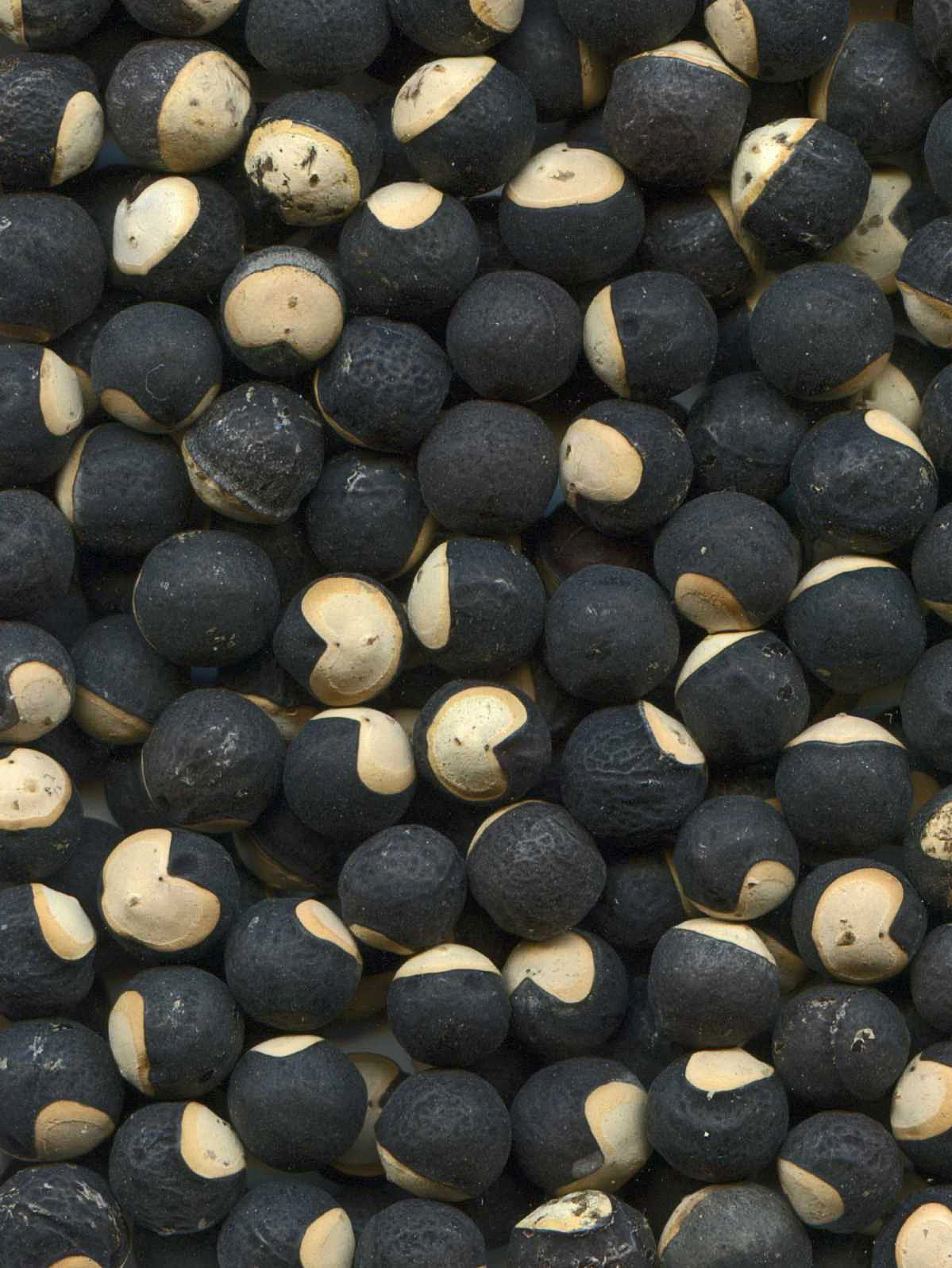
Seeds
