= List of butterflies of China (Lycaenidae) =

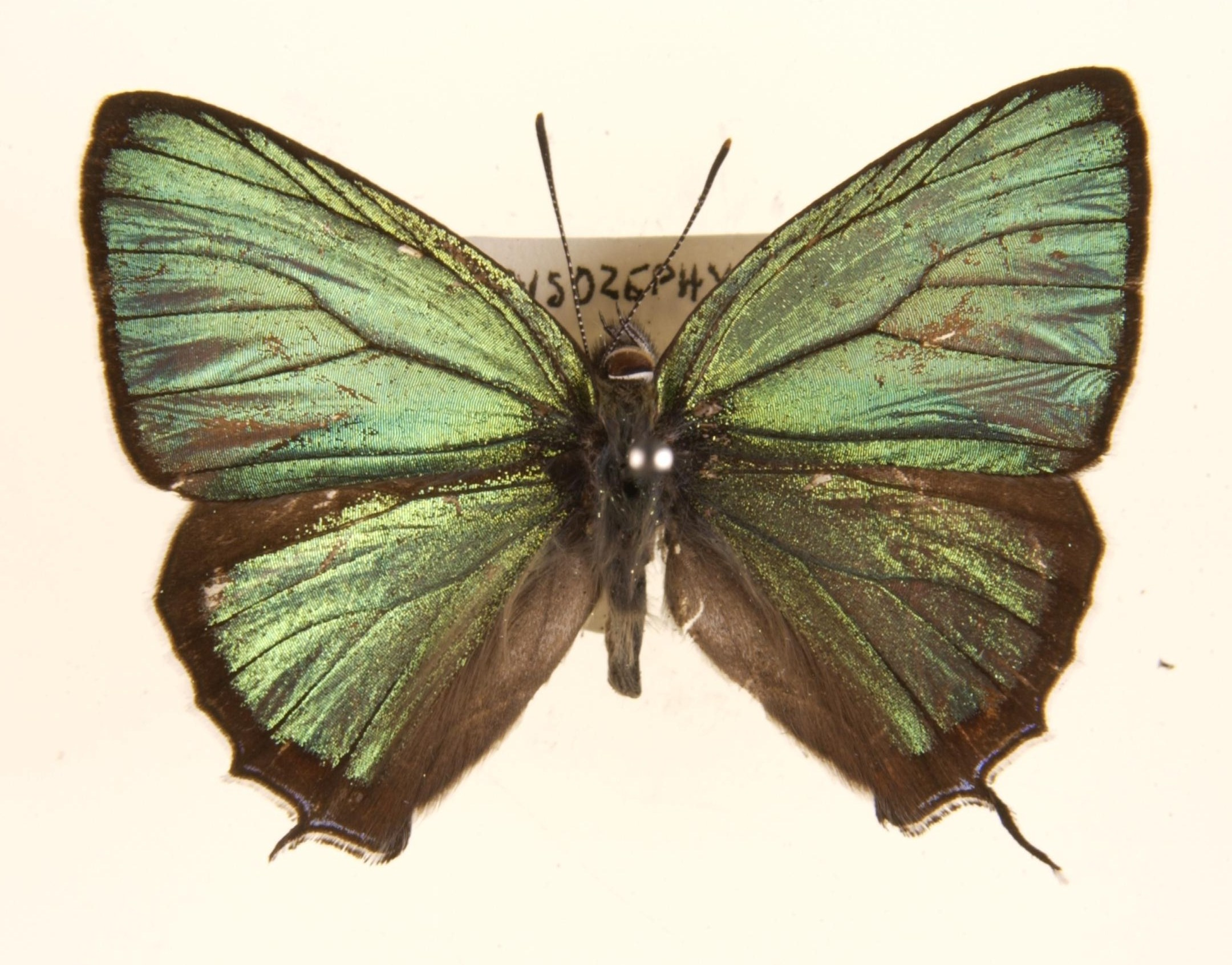
Chrysozephyrus nishikaze

This is a list of the butterflies of China belonging to the family Lycaenidae and an index to the species articles. This forms part of the full list of butterflies of China. 428 species or subspecies of Lycaenidae are recorded from China.

== Lycaenidae ==
genus: Acupicta

- Acupicta hainanicum Sugiyama, 1992 Hainan, Mount Wuzhi

genus: Acytolepis

- Acytolepis puspa (Horsfield, [1828])

A. p. myla (Fruhstorfer, 1909) Taiwan
A. p. hermagoras (Fruhstorfer, 1910) Hainan
A. p. gisca (Fruhstorfer, 1910) South China

genus: Afarsia

- Afarsia antoninae (Lukhtanov, 1999) Tian Shan
- Afarsia sieversii (Christoph, 1873)

A. s. haberhaueri (Staudinger, 1886) Tian Shan
A. s. gorana (Tshikolovets, 1997) Tian Shan

genus: Agriades

- Agriades amphirrhoe (Oberthür, 1910) Tibet
- Agriades arcaseia (Fruhstorfer, 1916) Tibet
- Agriades dis (Grum-Grshimailo, 1891) Central Asia
- Agriades janigena (Riley, 1923) Himalayas, Everest region
- Agriades lehanus (Moore, 1878)
- Agriades luana (Evans, 1915) Tibet
- Agriades morsheadi (Evans, 1923) Tibet
- Agriades optilete (Knoch, 1781)
- Agriades orbitulus (de Prunner, 1798)

A. o. luxurians (Forster, 1940) Yunnan
A. o. tatsienluica (Oberthür, 1910) Tibet
A. o. major (Evans, 1915) Tibet
A. o. pheretimus (Staudinger, 1892) Northwest China
A. o. shanxiensis Murayama, 1983 Shanxi
A. o. tyrone (Forster, 1940) Gansu
A. o. sajana (Heyne, 1895)
A. o. qinlingensis (Wang, 1998) Qinling Mountains
A. o. tibetana (D'Abrera, 1993) Tibet
A. o. demulaensis (Huang, 2001) Tibet
A. o. dongdalaensis (Huang, 2001) Tibet
A. o. litangensis (Huang, 2001) Sichuan

- Agriades orbona (Grum-Grshimailo, 1891)
- Agriades pheretiades (Eversmann, 1843)
- Agriades shahidulla (Yoshino, 2003) Xinjian
- Agriades sikkima (Bath, 1900) TL Sikkim

genus: Allotinus

- Allotinus drumila (Moore, [1866])

A. d. aphthonius Fruhstorfer, 1914 Yunnan

genus: Ahlbergia

- Ahlbergia chalybeia (Leech, 1890) Hubei, Sichuan
- Ahlbergia chalcidis Chou & Li, 1994 Yunnan
- Ahlbergia bimaculata Johnson, 1992 Sichuan, Yunnan
- Ahlbergia korea Johnson, 1992 Amurland, Northeast China
- Ahlbergia leei Johnson, 1992 Amurland, China
- Ahlbergia arquata Johnson, 1992 Tian Shan
- Ahlbergia pluto (Leech, 1893)

A. p. pluto (Leech, 1893) Sichuan
A. p. cyanusJohnson, 1992 Yunnan

- Ahlbergia clarofacia Johnson, 1992Sichuan, Yunnan

A. c. meridionalis Huang, 2003 Yunnan

- Ahlbergia aleucopuncta Johnson, 1992 Sichuan, Yunnan, Tibet, Amurland
- Ahlbergia unicolora Johnson, 1992Yunnan
- Ahlbergia pictila Johnson, 1992 Tibet
- Ahlbergia caerulea Johnson, 1992
- Ahlbergia zhujianhuai Huang & Wu, 2003 South Sichuan
- Ahlbergia frivaldszkyi aquilonaria Johnson, 1992 Manchuria
- Ahlbergia circe (Leech, 1893) Tibet, Yunnan, Sichuan
- Ahlbergia prodiga Johnson, 1992 Yunnan
- Ahlbergia caesius Johnson, 1992 East Tibet, West Sichuan
- Ahlbergia lynda Johnson, 1992

A. l. lynda Johnson, 1992 Sichuan
A. l. nidadana Huang, 2003 Yunnan

- Ahlbergia nicevillei (Leech, 1893) Hubei, West Yunnan
- Ahlbergia hsui Johnson, 2000 South Gansu
- Ahlbergia distincta Huang, 2003 Yunnan
- Ahlbergia clarolinea H. Huang & A.M. Chen, 2006.
- Ahlbergia oppocoenosa Johnson, 1992 Tibet

genus: Allotinus

- Allotinus drumila (Moore, [1866])

genus: Alpherakya

- Alpherakya sarta (Alphéraky, 1881)

A. s. laziensis (Huang, 1998) Tibet

genus: Antigius

- Antigius attilia (Bremer, 1861)
- Antigius butleri (Fenton, 1881)

A. b. miniakonga Yoshino, 1999 Sichuan

- Antigius cheni Koiwaya, 2004 Sichuan, Tianquan
- Antigius jinpingi Y.F. Hsu, 2009 Taiwan

genus: Amblopala

- Amblopala avidiena (Hewitson, 1877)

A. a. avidiena (Hewitson, 1877)
A. a. pherenice Fruhstorfer, 1915 Sichuan
A. a. y-fasciata (Sonan) Taiwan

genus: Amblypodia

- Amblypodia anita Hewitson, 1862

A. a. hainana Crowley, 1900 Hainan

genus: Ancema

- Ancema ctesia (Hewitson, 1865)

A. c. ctesia (Hewitson, 1865) West China
A. c. cakravasti (Fruhstorfer, 1909) Taiwan

- Ancema blanka (de Nicéville, 1894)

A. b. blanka de Nicéville, 1894)

genus: Anthene

- Anthene emolus (Godart, [1824])

A. e. emolus (Godart, [1824]) South China, Hainan, South Yunnan
A. e. goberus (Fruhstorfer, 1916) Hainan

- Anthene lycaenina (Felder, 1868)

A. l. lycambes (Hewitson, 1878) South Yunnan

genus: Araotes

- Araotes lapithis lapithis (Moore 1857) Yunnan

genus: Araragi

- Araragi enthea (Janson, 1877)

A. e. entheoides (Oberthür, 1914) Sichuan

- Araragi sugiyamai Matsui, 1989 Sichuan

A. s. zhejiangana Tong, 1994 Zhejiang

- Araragi panda Hsu & Chou, 2001

genus: Arhopala

- Arhopala arvina (Hewitson, 1863)
- Arhopala japonica (Murray, 1875)

A. j. kotoshona (Sonan, 1947) Taiwan

- Arhopala bazaloides (Hewitson, 1878)
- Arhopala centaurus (Fabricius, 1775)

A. c. nakula (C. & R. Felder, 1860) Hainan, Yunnan
A. c. pirithous (Moore, [1884]) South China

- Arhopala oenea (Hewitson, 1869) Sikkim, Yunnan
- Arhopala aida de Nicéville, 1889 Hainan
- Arhopala rama (Kollar, [1844])

A. r. rama (Kollar, [1844]) Yunnan

- Arhopala bazalus (Hewitson, 1862)

A. b. teesta (de Nicéville, 1886) West China

- Arhopala eumolphus (Cramer, [1780]) Hainan
- Arhopala hellenore Doherty, 1889 Hainan
- Arhopala ganesa (Leech, 1890)

A. g. seminigra (Leech, 1890) West China, Hainan

- Arhopala ammonides bowringi (Evans, 1957) Hainan

A. a. bowringi (Evans, 1957) Hainan

- Arhopala singla (de Nicéville, 1885)
- Arhopala paramuta (de Nicéville, [1884])
- Arhopala paraganesa (de Nicéville, 1882)

A. p. paraganesa (de Nicéville, 1882)

- Arhopala hellenoroides Chou & Gu, 1994 Hainan
- Arhopala qiongdaoensis Chou & Gu, 1994 Hainan
- Arhopala aberrans (de Nicéville, [1889]) West China
- Arhopala birmana (Moore, [1884])

A. b. birmana (Moore, [1884]) Hong Kong
A. b. asakurae (Matsumura, 1910) Taiwan

- Arhopala comica de Nicéville, 1900
- Arhopala perimuta Moore, 1857

genus: Aricia

- Aricia agestis (Denis & Schiffermüller, 1775) Tian Shan
- Aricia artaxerxes (Fabricius, 1793)

A. a. scytissa Nekrutenko, 1985 Tian Shan
A. a. allous (Geyer, [1834-1836])

- Aricia chinensis chinensis (Murray, 1874)
- Aricia berezowskii Grum-Grshimailo, 1902 Sichuan

genus: Athamanthia

- Athamanthia athamantis (Eversmann, 1854)
- Athamanthia dilutior (Staudinger, 1881)

genus: Artipe

- Artipe eryx (Linnaeus, 1771)

A. e. eryx (Linnaeus, 1771) South China
A. e. horiella (Matsumura, 1929) Taiwan

genus: Artopoetes

- Artopoetes pryeri (Murray, 1873)
- Artopoetes praetextatus (Fujioka, 1992)

genus: Bindahara

- Bindahara phocides (Fabricius 1793) Yunnan

genus: Bothrinia

- Bothrinia nebulosa (Leech, 1890)

B. n. nebulosa (Leech, 1890) West China, Central China
B. n. leechi Forster, 1941 Sichuan

genus: Caerulea

- Caerulea coeligena (Oberthür, 1876) West China, Central China
- Caerulea coelestis (Alphéraky, 1897) West China, Tibet

genus: Caleta

- Caleta elna (Hewitson, 1876)

C. e. noliteia (Fruhstorfer, 1918) South Yunnan, Hainan

- Caleta roxus (Godart, [1824])

C. r. roxana (de Nicéville, 1897) Yunnan

genus: Callophrys

- Callophrys rubi (Linnaeus, 1758)

genus: Castalius

- Castalius rosimon (Fabricius, 1775)

genus: Catochrysops

- Catochrysops panormus (C. Felder, 1860)

C. p. exiguus (Distant, 1886) Taiwan, South Yunnan

- Catochrysops strabo (Fabricius, 1793)

genus: Catapaecilma

- Catapaecilma major Druce, 1895

C. m. major Druce, 1895
C. m. moltrechti (Wileman, 1908) Taiwan

genus: Celastrina

- Celastrina argiolus (Linnaeus, 1758)

C. a. bieneri Forster, 1941 Yunnan

- Celastrina sugitanii (Matsumura, 1919)
- Celastrina gigas (Hemming, 1928)

C. g. fujianensis Huang, 1994 Fujian

- Celastrina lavendularis (Moore, 1877)
- Celastrina morsheadi (Evans, 1915) Tibet
- Celastrina perplexa Eliot & Kawazoé, 1983 Kangding
- Celastrina filipjevi (Riley, 1934)
- Celastrina oreas (Leech, 1893)

C. o. baileyi Eliot & Kawazoé, 1983 Tibet
C. o. yunnana Eliot & Kawazoé, 1983 Yunnan

- Celastrina hersilia (Leech, [1893])

C. h. hersilia (Leech, [1893]) China

- Celastrina huegeli (Moore, 1882)
- Celastrina melaena (Doherty, 1889)

genus: Celatoxia

- Celatoxia marginata (de Nicéville, [1884])

C. m. marginata (de Nicéville, [1884]) Yunnan, Taiwan

genus: Charana

- Charana mandarinus (Hewitson, 1863)

genus: Cheritrella

- Cheritrella truncipennis de Nicéville, 1887 West China, Hunnan

genus: Chilades

- Chilades lajus (Stoll, [1780])

C. l. lajus (Stoll, [1780]) Hong Kong, Hainan

- Chilades yunnanensis Watkins, 1927 Yongchang

genus: Chliaria

- Chliaria kina (Hewitson, 1869)

C. k. kina (Hewitson, 1869)

- Chliaria othona (Hewitson, 1865)

C. o. othona Hewitson, 1869

genus: Chrysozephyrus

- Chrysozephyrus smaragdinus (Bremer, 1861)

C. s. smaragdinus (Bremer, 1861) Shaanxi, Sichuan
C. s. yunnanensis (Howarth, 1957) Yunnan

- Chrysozephyrus brillantinus (Staudinger, 1887)

C. b. brillantinus (Staudinger, 1887) Northeast China

- Chrysozephyrus scintillans (Leech, 1894) Yunnan, Sichuan, Guangdong, Zhejiang

C. s. choui ( Tong, 1994 Zhejiang
C. s. hainanensis Wang & Gu, 1997 Hainan

- Chrysozephyrus leigongshanensis Chou & Li, 1994 Guizhou
- Chrysozephyrus kuromon (Sugiyama, 1994) Sichuan
- Chrysozephyrus parakuromon Huang, 2001 Tibet
- Chrysozephyrus chinensis (Howarth, 1957) Sichuan
- Chrysozephyrus marginatus (Howarth, 1957) Sichuan, Sichuan, Shaanxi
- Chrysozephyrus nigroapicalis (Howarth, 1957)
- Chrysozephyrus souleana (Riley, 1939) Tibet, West China
- Chrysozephyrus tatsienluensis (Murayama, 1955)
- Chrysozephyrus tienmushanus Shirôzu & Yamamoto, 1956
- Chrysozephyrus kabrua konga Yoshino, 1999 Sichuan

C. k. niitakanus (Kano, 1928) Taiwan
C. k. neidhoeferi Shimonoya & Murayama, 1971 Taiwan
C. k. konga Yoshino, 1999 Sichuan

- Chrysozephyrus vittatus (Tytler, 1915)
- Chrysozephyrus duma (Hewitson, 1869)

C. d. desgodinsi (Oberthür, 1886) West China, Sichuan, Yunnan

- Chrysozephyrus disparatus (Howarth, 1957)

C. d. disparatus Howarth 1957
C. d. pseudotaiwanus Howarth 1957
C. d. hainanus Wang & Gu, 1997 Hainan

- Chrysozephyrus mushaellus (Matsumura, 1938)

C. m. rileyi (Forster, 1940) West China, Jiangxi

- Chrysozephyrus sakura Sugiyama, 1992

C. s. meili Yoshino, 1999 Yunnan

- Chrysozephyrus teisoi Sonan 1941
- Chrysozephyrus sikkimensis Howarth 1957
- Chrysozephyrus rarasanus Matsumura 1939
- Chrysozephyrus nishikaze Araki & Shibatani 1941

C. m. mushaellus Matsumura, 1938

- Chrysozephyrus lingi Okano & Ohkura
- Chrysozephyrus leii Chou
- Chrysozephyrus hisamatsusanus Nagami & Ishiga 1937

C. h. splendidulus Murayama, 1965 Taiwan

- Chrysozephyrus morishitai Chou & Zhu, 1994

C. d. pseudotaiwanus (Howarth, 1957)

- Chrysozephyrus shimizui Yoshino, 1997 Guizhou, Mount Fanjinshan
- Chrysozephyrus setohi Koiwaya, 1996 Sichuan, Daba Shan
- Chrysozephyrus zoa (de Nicéville, 1889)
- Chrysozephyrus sakula H. Sugiyama, 1992 Sichuan, Mount Sigunyang
- Chrysozephyrus yoshikoae Koiwaya, 1993 Shaanxi, Chang'an
- Chrysozephyrus linae Koiwaya, 1993 Shaanxi, Zhouzhi Xian
- Chrysozephyrus gaoi Koiwaya, 1993 Shaanxi, Zhouzhi Xian
- Chrysozephyrus tienmushanus Shirôzu & Yamamoto, 1956 Zhejiang
- Chrysozephyrus watsoni (W.H. Evans, 1927)
- Chrysozephyrus inthanonensis Murayama & Kimura, 1990
- Chrysozephyrus yuchingkinus Murayama & Shimonoya, 1960 Taiwan
- Chrysozephyrus paona (Tytler, 1915)
- Chrysozephyrus dumoides (Tytler, 1915)
- Chrysozephyrus esakii (Sonan, 1940) Taiwan

genus: Cigaritis

- Cigaritis rukma (de Nicéville, [1889]) Yunnan
- Cigaritis acamas (Klug, 1834)
- Cigaritis lohita (Horsfield, [1829]

C. n. batina (Fruhstorfer, [1912]) Yunnan

- Cigaritis syama (Horsfield, [1829])

C. s. sepulveda (Fruhstorfer, 1912) West China, Central China
C. s. peguanus (Moore, 1884) Yunnan
C. s. hainana (Eliot) Hainan

- Cigaritis zhengweille Huang ? Yunan

C. z. chayuensis (Huang, 2001) Tibet

- Cigaritis leechi Swinhoe, 1912 West China
- Cigaritis takanonis (Matsumura, 1906) West China, Central China
- Cigaritis kuyaniana Matsumura, Taiwan
- Cigaritis rukmini (de Nicéville，[1889])
- Cigaritis zhengweilie Huang, 1998 Yunnan

genus: Cissatsuma

- Cissatsuma albilinea (Riley, 1939) Southwest China, Tibet
- Cissatsuma kansuensis Johnson, 1992 Gansu (i.e., Kansu)
- Cissatsuma halosa Johnson, 1992 Yunnan, Sichuan, Gansu, Tainghai, Tibet
- Cissatsuma tuba Johnson, 1992 Yunnan
- Cissatsuma crenata Johnson, 1992 Yunnan
- Cissatsuma contexta Johnson, 1992 Wui-si, Yunnan

genus: Cordelia

- Cordelia minerva (Leech, 1890) West China
- Cordelia comes (Leech, 1890)

C . c. comes (Leech, 1890) West China, Central China
C. c. wilemaniella (Matsumura, 1929) Taiwan

- Cordelia kitawakii Koiwaya, 1996 Sichuan, Dabashan

genus: Coreana

- Coreana raphaelis (Oberthur, 1881) Northeast China

genus: Creon

- Creon cleobis (Godart, [1824])

genus: Cupido

- Cupido buddhista (Alphéraky, 1881) Tian Shan, Northwest China
- Cupido minimus (Fuessly, 1775) Tian Shan
- Cupido osiris (Meigen, 1829) Tian Shan
- Cupido gisela (Püngeler, 1901) Tibet
- Cupido lacturnus (Godart, [1824])
- Cupido argiades (Pallas, 1771)

C. a. hellotia (Ménétriés, 1857) Heilongjiang, Liaoning, Jilin, North China (Beijing, Hebei, Shandong, Henan, Shaanxi), Sichuan, Jiangsu, Zhejiang, Shanghai, Fujian, Hunan
C. a. merisina (Lorkovic, 1943) Guangdong
C. a. tibetanus (Lorkovic, 1943) Yunnan
C. a. nujiangensis (Huang, 2001) Tibet
C. a. chayuensis (Huang, 2001) Tibet

- Cupido prosecusa (Erschoff, 1874)

genus: Curetis

- Curetis bulis (Westwood, 1852)

C. b. doxa Evans, 1954 Hainan

- Curetis acuta Moore, 1877

C. a. acuta Moore, 1877 China
C. a. dentata Moore, 1879 South China, West China
C. a. denta Evans, 1954 Hainan

- Curetis naga Evans, 1954
- Curetis saronis Moore, 1877
- Curetis brunnea Wileman, 1909 Taiwan

genus: Cyaniris

- Cyaniris semiargus (Rottemburg, 1775)

C. s. altaiana Tutt, 1909 Tian Shan
C. s. amurensis Tutt, 1909 Amur, Ussuri

genus: Dacalana

- Dacalana cotys (Hewitson, 1865)

genus: Deudorix

- Deudorix hainana Chou & Gu, 1994 Hainan
- Deudorix epijarbas (Moore, 1857)

D. e. menesicles Fruhstorfer, 1912 Taiwan

- Deudorix hypargyria (Elwes, [1893])
- Deudorix rapaloides (Naritomi, 1941) Taiwan
- Deudorix sankakuhonis Matsumura, 1938 Taiwan
- Deudorix pseudorapaloides M. Wang & I. Chou, 1997 Guangxi Province

genus: Discolampa

- Discolampa ethion (Westwood, 1851)

D. e. ethion (Westwood, 1851) Hainan

genus: Esakiozephyrus

- Esakiozephyrus icana (Moore, [1875])

E. i. setschuanica (Riley, 1939) Sichuan
E. i. dimuwa (Yoshino, 1995) Yunnan
E. i. paiensis Huang, 2000 Tibet

- Esakiozephyrus longicaudatus Huang, 2001 Tibet
- Esakiozephyrus vallonia (Oberthür, 1914) West China
- Esakiozephyrus neis (Oberthür, 1914) West China
- Esakiozephyrus tsangkie (Oberthür, 1886) Tibet
- Esakiozephyrus ackeryi (Fujioka, 1994) Shaanxi, Qinling Mountains
- Esakiozephyrus bieti (Oberthür, 1886)

E. b. bieti (Oberthür, 1886) Tibet
E. b. takanamii (Huang, 2000) Yunnan
E. b. mangkangensis Huang, 2001 East Tibet

- Esakiozephyrus mandara (Doherty, 1886)

E. m. major Huang, 1998 Tibet

- Esakiozephyrus zhengi Huang, 1998 Tibet
- Esakiozephyrus neis (Oberthür, 1914) West China

genus: Euaspa

- Euaspa milionia (Hewitson, 1869) Taiwan
- Euaspa forsteri (Esaki & Shirôzu, 1943) Taiwan
- Euaspa tayal (Esaki & Shirôzu, 1943) Taiwan

genus: Euchrysops

- Euchrysops cnejus (Fabricius, 1798)

genus: Eumedonia

- Eumedonia annulata (Elwes, 1906) Tibet
- Eumedonia eumedon (Esper, 1780)

E. e. ambigua (Staudinger, 1899) Tian Shan

- Eumedonia lamasem (Oberthür, 1910)
- Eumedonia persephatta (Alphéraky, 1881) Tian Shan

genus: Famegana

- Famegana alsulus (Herrich-Schäffer, 1869)

F. a. eggletoni (Corbet, 1941) Hong Kong

genus: Favonius

- Favonius cognatus (Staudinger, 1892) Northeast China
- Favonius korshunovi (Dubatolov & Sergeev, 1982) Northeast China
- Favonius leechi (Riley, 1939) Sichuan
- Favonius orientalis (Murray, 1875) Northeast China.
- Favonius taxila (Bremer, 1861) Northeast China
- Favonius ultramarinus (Fixsen, 1887) Northeast China
- Favonius saphirinus (Staudinger, 1887) Northeast China

genus: Flos

- Flos asoka (de Nicéville, [1884]) Southwest China, Hong Kong.
- Flos areste (Hewitson, 1862) Zhejiang, Guangdong
- Flos chinensis (C. & R. Felder, [1865]) Southwest China, Shanghai
- Flos diardi (Hewitson, 1862)
- Flos adriana de Nicéville，[1883]
- Flos yunnanensis ?

genus: Freyeria

- Freyeria putli (Kollar, [1844])
- Freyeria trochylus (Freyer, 1845)

genus: Glabroculus

- Glabroculus cyane (Eversmann, 1837)

genus: Glaucopsyche

- Glaucopsyche alexis (Poda, 1761)

G. a. alexis (Poda, 1761) Tian Shan

- Glaucopsyche lycormas (Butler, 1866)

G. l. lycormas (Butler, 1866) Northeast China

genus: Gonerilia

- Gonerilia thespis (Leech, 1890) West China, Tibet
- Gonerilia seraphim (Oberthür, 1886)

G. s. seraphim (Oberthür, 1886) Sichuan
G. s. mekong Yoshino, 1999 Yunnan

- Gonerilia budda (Sugiyama, 1992) West China
- Gonerilia okamurai (Koiwaya, 1996)
- Gonerilia pesthis (Wang & Chou, 1998)

genus: Heliophorus

- Heliophorus epicles (Godart, [1824])

H. e. latilimbata Eliot, 1963 South Yunnan
H. e. phoenicoparyphus (Holland, 1887) Hainan

- Heliophorus ila (de Nicéville & Martin, [1896])

H. i. chinensis (Fruhstorfer, 1908) West China
H. i. urius Eliot, 1963 South Yunnan

- Heliophorus kohimensis (Tytler, 1912) Yunnan
- Heliophorus brahma (Moore, [1858])

H. b. mogoka Evans, 1932 Yunnan

- Heliophorus androcles (Westwood, 1851)

H. a. androcles (Westwood, 1851) West China
H. a. trilunulata Huang, 1999 Tibet
H. a. rubida Riley, 1929 Yunnan

- Heliophorus viridipunctata (de Nicéville, 1890)

H. v. viridipunctata (de Nicéville, 1890) West China
H. v. naxi Yoshino, 1997 Yunnan

- Heliophorus moorei (Hewitson, 1865)

H. m. moorei (Hewitson, 1865) Tibet

- Heliophorus saphirioides Murayama, 1992
- Heliophorus pulcher Chou, 1994 Sichuan
- Heliophorus saphir (Blanchard, 1871)
- Heliophorus yunnani D'Abrera, 1993 Yunnan
- Heliophorus delacouri Eliot, 1963 South China
- Heliophorus stotzneri (Draeseke, 1925) Sichuan
- Heliophorus eventa Fruhstorfer, 1918 Yunnan
- Heliophorus gloria Huang, 1999 China, Hanmi, Metok, 1800-2300 m.
- Heliophorus indicus Fruhstorfer, 1908
- Heliophorus brilliantinus H. Huang, 1999 Yunnan
- Heliophorus tamu (Kollar, 1844)

genus: Horaga

- Horaga syrinx (C. Felder, 1860)
- Horaga onyx (Moore, [1858])

H. o. moltrechti Matsumura, 1919 Taiwan, Hong Kong

- Horaga albimacula (Wood-Mason & de Nicéville, 1881)

H. a. triumphali s Murayama & Sibatani, 1943 Taiwan

- Horaga rarasana Sonan, 1936 Taiwan

genus: Howarthia

- Howarthia watanabei Koiwaya, 1993 Hainan
- Howarthia caelestis (Leech, 1890)

H. c. elegans Sugiyama, 1997 West China

- Howarthia courvoisieri (Oberthür, 1908) West China
- Howarthia cheni (Chou & Wang, 1997)
- Howarthia melli (Forster, 1940) Guangdong
- Howarthia nigricans (Leech, 1893)
- Howarthia choui (Wang & Li, 2004)

genus: Hypolycaena

- Hypolycaena vanavasa (Fruhstorfer, 1909)Taiwan
- Hypolycaena erylus (Godart, [1824])

H. e. himavantusFruhstorfer, 1912 South Yunnan

- Hypolycaena othona madana (Fruhstorfer, [1912]) Yunnan

genus: Iolana

- Iolana gigantea (Grum-Grshimailo, 1885)

genus: Ionolyce

- Ionolyce helicon merguiana (Moore, 1884) Yunnan

genus: Iraota

- Iraota timoleon (Stoll, [1790])

I. t. timoleon(Stoll, [1790]) South China

genus: Iratsume

- Iratsume orsedice (Butler, [1882])

I. o. suzukii (Sonan, 1940) Taiwan

genus: Jacoona

- Jacoona fabronia (Hewitson 1878)

genus: Jamides

- Jamides bochus (Stoll, [1782])

J. b. bochus Yunnan
J. b. plato (Fabricius, 1793) China

- Jamides celeno (Cramer, [1775])

J. c. aelianus (Fabricius, 1793) Yunnan

- Jamides alecto (Felder, 1860)

J. a. alocina Swinhoe, 1915 South China

- Jamides elpis (Godart, [1824])
- Jamides pura (Moore, 1886)

genus: Japonica

- Japonica saepestriata (Hewitson, 1865)

J. s. takenakakazuoi Fujioka, 1993 Central China

- Japonica lutea (Hewitson, 1865)

J. l. dubatolovi Fujioka, 1993 Northeast China
J. l. adusta (Riley, 1939) Sichuan, Tibet
J. l. tatsienluica (Riley, 1939) Sichuan
J. l. patungkoanui Murayama, 1956 Taiwan

- Japonica bella Hsu, 1997 (Nanlingozephyrus)

genus: Kretania

- Kretania pylaon (Fischer von Waldheim, 1832)
- Kretania usbekus Forster, 1939 Tian Shan

genus: Lampides

- Lampides boeticus (Linnaeus, 1767)

genus: Leptotes

- Leptotes plinius (Fabricius, 1793

genus: Lestranicus

- Lestranicus transpectus (Moore, 1879)

genus: Leucantigius

- Leucantigius atayalica (Shirôzu & Murayama, 1943)

L. a. atayalica (Shirôzu & Murayama, 1943) Taiwan
L. a. unicolor Saigusa, 1993 Fujian
L. a. hainanensis Gu & Wang, 1997 Hainan

genus: Logania

- Logania marmorata Moore, 1884

genus: Loxura

- Loxura atymnus (Stoll, [1780])

L. a. continentalis Fruhstorfer, 1912 South China, Hainan, South Yunnan

genus: Luthrodes

- Luthrodes galba (Lederer, 1855)
- Luthrodes pandava (Horsfield, [1829])

L. p. pandava (Horsfield, [1829]) Taiwan

- Luthrodes peripatria (Hsu, 1980)

genus: Lycaena

- Lycaena phlaeas (Linnaeus, 1761)

L. p. hypophlaeas (Boisduval, 1852) Ussuri
L. p. chinensis (Felder, 1862) South Ussuri
L. p. flavens (Ford, 1924) Tibet

- Lycaena helle ([Schiffermüller], 1775)

L. h. phintonis (Fruhstorfer, 1910) Amur

- Lycaena standfussi (Grum-Grshimailo, 1891) Tibet, West China
- Lycaena pang (Oberthür, 1886) Tibet, West China
- Lycaena tseng (Oberthür, 1886) West China
- Lycaena ouang (Oberthür, 1891) Yunnan
- Lycaena irmae Bailey, 1932 Tibet
- Lycaena li (Oberthür, 1886) West China
- Lycaena svenhedini (Nordström, 1935) China
- Lycaena dispar (Haworth, 1802)

L. d. rutila (Werneburg, 1864) Tian Shan
L. d. aurata Leech, 1887 Amur, Ussuri

- Lycaena violaceus (Staudinger, 1892) North China
- Lycaena splendens (Staudinger, 1881) Tian Shan
- Lycaena alciphron (Rottemburg, 1775)

L. a. naryna (Oberthür, 1910) Tian Shan
L. a. acutipennis Chou & Zhang, 1994 Xinjiang

- Lycaena thersamon (Esper, 1784)

L. t. jiadengyuensis (Huang & Murayama, 1992) Xinjiang (Altai)

- Lycaena solskyi Erschoff, 1874

L. s. fulminans (Grum-Grshimailo, 1888) Tian Shan

- Lycaena alpherakii (Grum-Grshimailo, 1888) Northwest China
- Lycaena margelanica Staudinger, 1881

L. m. margelanica Staudinger, 1881 Tian Shan

- Lycaena virgaureae (Linnaeus, 1758)

L. v. virgaureae (Linnaeus, 1758) Altai
L. v. virgaureola (Staudinger, 1892) Amur, Ussuri

- Lycaena tityrus (Poda, 1761) Altai
- Lycaena hippothoe (Linnaeus, 1761)

L. h. amurensis (Staudinger, 1892) Amur, Ussuri

- Lycaena pavana (Kollar, [1844])
- Lycaena kasyapa (Moore, 1865)

genus: Mahathala

- Mahathala ameria (Hewitson, 1862)

M. a. ameria (Hewitson, 1862) Chang Yang
M. a. hainani Bethune-Baker, 1903 South China, Hainan, Taiwan

- Mahathala ariadeva Fruhstorfer, 1908

genus: Maneca

- Maneca bhotea (Moore, 1884)

M. b. unnanensis Yoshino, 2001 Yunnan

genus: Megisba

- Megisba malaya (Horsfield, [1828])

M. m. sikkima Moore, 1884 South Yunnan

genus: Miletus

- Miletus chinensis C. Felder, 1862

M. c. chinensis C. Felder, 1862 Yunnan, Southeast China, Hainan

- Miletus mallus (Fruhstorfer, 1913)

M. m. gethusus (Fruhstorfer, 1915) South Yunnan

- Miletus bannanus Huang & Xue, 2004 South Yunnan
- Miletus archilochus (Fruhstorfer, 1913)

Miletus archilochus archilochus (Fruhstorfer, 1913) Yunnan
M. a. guangxiensis Li, 1994 Guangxi

genus: Monodontides

- Monodontides musina (Snellen, 1892)

Monodontides musina musinoides (Swinhoe, 1910)

genus: Mota

- Mota massyla (Hewitson, 1869) Yunnan

genus: Nacaduba

- Nacaduba pactolus (Felder, 1860)

N. p. continentalis Fruhstorfer, 1916 West China
N. p. hainani Bethune-Baker, 1914 Taiwan, Hainan

- Nacaduba berenice (Herrich-Schäffer, 1869

N. b. leei Hsu, 1990 Taiwan

- Nacaduba kurava (Moore, [1858])

N. k. euplea Fruhstorfer, 1916 South China
N. k. therasia Fruhstorfer, 1916 Taiwan

- Nacaduba beroe (C. & R. Felder, [1865])

N. b. beroe (C. & R. Felder, [1865])
N. b. asakusa Fruhstorfer, 1916 Taiwan

- Nacaduba takamukuana Matsumura, 1919 Taiwan
- Nacaduba taiwana Matsumura, 1919 Taiwan
- Nacaduba hermus Felder, 1860

genus: Neolycaena

- Neolycaena davidi (Oberthür, 1881)

N. d. davidi (Oberthür, 1881) Northeast China
N. d. tangutica (Grum-Grshimailo, 1891) Tibet

- Neolycaena eckweileri Lukhtanov, 1993 Tian Shan
- Neolycaena submontana Zhdanko, [1996] Tian Shan
- Neolycaena baidula Zhdanko, 2000 Tian Shan
- Neolycaena medea Zhdanko, 1998 Tian Shan
- Neolycaena sinensis (Alphéraky, 1881) Tibet, Tian Shan
- Neolycaena olga Lukhtanov, 1999 Tian Shan
- Neolycaena rhymnus (Eversmann, 1832)
- Neolycaena tengstroemi (Erschoff, 1874)
- Neolycaena iliensis (Grum-Grshimailo, 1891)

genus: Neopithecops

- Neopithecops zalmora (Butler, [1870])

N. z. zalmora (Butler, [1870])

genus: Neozephyrus

- Neozephyrus japonicus (Murray, 1875) Northeast China

N. j. regina (Butler, [1882]) Amur, Ussuri

- Neozephyrus coruscans (Leech, 1894) West China
- Neozephyrus dubernardi (Riley, 1939) West China
- Neozephyrus helenae Howarth, 1957 West China
- Neozephyrus asahii Fujioka, 2003 Kouy Tcheou
- Neozephyrus uedai Koiwaya, 1996 West China
- Neozephyrus taiwanus (Wileman, 1908) Taiwan

genus: Niphanda

- Niphanda fusca (Bremer & Grey, 1853)

N. f. fusca (Bremer & Grey, 1853) Amur, Ussuri, Northeast China

- Niphanda asialis (de Nicéville, 1895)

N. a. marcia (Fawcett, 1904) Yunnan

- Niphanda cymbia de Nicéville, [1884]

genus: Novosatsuma

- Novosatsuma pratti (Leech, 1889) Chang Yang
- Novosatsuma collosa K. Johnson, 1992 Gansu
- Novosatsuma matusiki K. Johnson, 1992 Tibet
- Novosatsuma magnasuffusa K. Johnson, 1992 Yunnan
- Novosatsuma plumbagina K. Johnson, 1992 Shaanxi
- Novosatsuma magnapurpurea K. Johnson, 1992 Sichuan
- Novosatsuma cibdela K. Johnson, 1992

genus: Orthomiella

- Orthomiella pontis (Elwes, 1887)

O. p. rovorea (Fruhstorfer, 1918) Yunnan

- Orthomiella rantaizana Wileman, 1910 South China
- Orthomiella sinensis (Elwes, 1887) South China

genus: Palaeophilotes

- Palaeophilotes triphysina (Staudinger, 1891)

genus: Pamiria

- Pamiria chrysopis (Grum-Grshimailo, 1888)
- Pamiria metallica (C. & R. Felder, [1865])
- Pamiria omphisa (Moore, [1875]) North China

genus: Patricius

- Patricius felicis (Oberthür, 1886) Tibet
- Patricius gaborronkayi (Bálint, 1997) Tibet
- Patricius lucifera (Staudinger, 1867) West China

P. l. selengensis (Forster, 1940)

- Patricius lucifuga (Fruhstorfer, 1915) Tibet
- Patricius lucina (Grum-Grshimailo, 1902) Songpan
- Patricius themis (Grum-Grshimailo, 1891)
- Patricius younghusbandi (Elwes, 1906) Tibet

genus: Petrelaea

- Petrelaea dana (de Nicéville, [1884])

genus: Phengaris

- Phengaris albida Leech, 1893 West China
- Phengaris atroguttata (Oberthür, 1876)

P. a. formosana (Matsumura) Taiwan (i.e., Formosa)
P. a. juenana (Forster, 1940) Yunnan
P. a. lampra (Röber, 1926) Yunnan

- Phengaris daitozana Wileman
- Phengaris arion (Linnaeus, 1758)

P. a. xiaheana (Murayama, 1991) Gansu
P. a. inferna (Sibatani, Saigusa & Hirowatari, 1994) Sichuan

- Phengaris cyanecula (Eversmann, 1848)

P. c. ussuriensis (Sheljuzhko, 1928) Amur, Ussuri
P. c. obscurior (Staudinger, 1901) Tian Shan

- Phengaris arionides (Staudinger, 1887)

P. a. arionides (Staudinger, 1887) Amur, Ussuri

- Phengaris rebeli (Hirschke, 1904)

P. r. imitator (Tuzov, 2000) North Tian Shan
P. r. kondakovi (Kurentzov, 1970) Amur, Ussuri, Northeast China

- Phengaris teleius (Bergsträsser, [1779])

P. t. euphemia (Staudinger, 1887) Amur, Ussuri
P. t. chosensis (Matsumura, 1927) South Ussuri
P. t. sinalcon (Murayama, 1992) China

- Phengaris kurentzovi (Sibatani, Saigusa & Hirowatari, 1994)

P. k. kurentzovi (Sibatani, Saigusa & Hirowatari, 1994) Amur, Ussuri

- Phengaris alcon (Denis & Schiffermüller, 1775)

P. a. alcon (Denis & Schiffermüller, 1775)

genus: Pithecops

- Pithecops fulgens Doherty, 1889

P. f. fulgens Doherty, 1889 China
P. f. urai Bethune-Baker, 1913 Taiwan

- Pithecops corvus Fruhstorfer, 1919

P. c. correctus Cowan, 1965 South Yunnan

genus: Plebejus

- Plebejus eversmanni (Lang, 1884) Tian Shan
- Plebejus argus (Linnaeus, 1758)

P. a. wolgensis (Forster, 1936) Tian Shan
P. a. clarasiaticus (Verity, 1931) Amur
P. a. coreanus Tutt, 1909 Amur, Ussuri

- Plebejus agnatus (Rühl, 1895) Tian Shan
- Plebejus argyrognomon (Bergstrasser, [1779]) Amur
- Plebejus pseudaegon (Butler, [1882]) Northeast China

P. p. sinicus (Forster, 1936) Sichuan

- Plebejus christophi (Staudinger, 1874)

P. c. nanshanica (Forster, 1936) Gansu

- Plebejus idas (Linnaeus, 1761)

P. i. tshimganus (Forster, 1936) Tian Shan

- Plebejus ganssuensis (Grum-Grshimailo, 1891) Amda, Kuku-Noor
- Plebejus calliopis (Boisduval, 1832)

P. c. aegina (Grum-Grshimailo, 1891) Tian Shan

- Plebejus subsolanus (Eversmann, 1851)

P. s. subsolanus (Eversmann, 1851) Amur, Ussuri
P. s. sifanica (Grum-Grshimailo, 1891) Gansu, Tibet

- Plebejus cleobis (Bremer, 1861)

P. c. tancrei (Graeser, 1888) Amur, Ussuri

- Plebejus hishikawai (Yoshino, 2003) Tibet
- Plebejus qinghaiensis (Murayama)
- Plebejus samudra (Moore, [1875])
- Plebejus maracandicus (Erschoff, 1874)

P. m. planorum (Alphéraky, 1881)

genus: Polyommatus

- Polyommatus actinides (Staudinger, 1886)

P. a. praeactinides (Forster, 1960) Tian Shan

- Polyommatus thersites (Cantener, 1834)

P. t. orientis (Sheljuzhko, 1928) Tian Shan

- Polyommatus ripartii (Freyer, 1830)

P. r. colemani (Lukhtanov & Dantchenko, 2002) Tian Shan
P. r. sarkani (Lukhtanov & Dantchenko, 2002) West China

- Polyommatus juldusa (Staudinger, 1886)

P. j. juldusa (Staudinger, 1886) Tian Shan

- Polyommatus phyllides (Staudinger, 1886) Tian Shan
- Polyommatus stigmatifera Courvoisier, 1903 Tian Shan
- Polyommatus kamtshadalis (Sheljuzhko, 1933) Amur, Ussuri
- Polyommatus forresti Bálint, 1992 Yunnan
- Polyommatus tsvetaevi Kurentzov, 1970Ussuri
- Polyommatus venus (Staudinger, 1886)

P. v. wiskotti (Courvoisier, 1911) Tian Shan
P. v. lama (Grum-Grshimailo, 1891) Amdo
P. v. sinina (Grum-Grshimailo, 1891) Kuku-Noor

- Polyommatus magnifica (Grum-Grshimailo, 1885) Tian Shan
- Polyommatus amandus (Schneider, 1792)

P. a. turensis (Heyne, 1895) Tian Shan
P. a. amurensis (Staudinger, 1892) Amur, Ussuri

- Polyommatus hunza (Grum-Grshimailo, 1890)
- Polyommatus icadius (Grum-Grshimailo, 1890)

P. i. candidus Zhdanko, 2000 Tian Shan

- Polyommatus icarus (Rottemburg, 1775)

P. i. omelkoi Dubatolov & Korshunov, 1995 Amur, Ussuri
P. i. napaea (Grum-Grshimailo, 1891) Tian Shan

- Polyommatus kashgharensis Moore, 1878

P. k. turanicus Heyne, [1895] Tian Shan

- Polyommatus iphigenides (Staudinger, 1886) Tian Shan
- Polyommatus everesti Riley, 1923 Tibet
- Polyommatus eros (Ochsenheimer, 1808)
- Polyommatus erotides (Kurentzov, 1970)

P. e. gansuensisMurayama

- Polyommatus kirgisorum Lukhtanov & Dantchenko, 1994

P. k. rueckbeili (Forster, 1960)

- Polyommatus damon Denis & Schiffermüller, 1775
- Polyommatus erigone (Grum-Grshimailo, 1890)
- Polyommatus nuksani (Forster, 1937)

genus: Porites

- Poritia erycinoides (C. Felder, 1865)

genus: Pratapa

- Pratapa icetas (Hewitson, 1865)

P. i. icetas (Hewitson, 1865) West China, Tibet
P. i. extensa Evans, 1925 Yunnan

- Pratapa deva (Moore, [1858])

P. d. devula Corbet, 1942 Hong Kong

genus: Prosotas

- Prosotas nora (Felder, 1860)

P. n. nora (Felder, 1860) Yunnan
P. n. formosana (Fruhstorfer, 1916) Taiwan (i.e., Formosa)
P. n. ardates (Moore, 1874) Yunnan

- Prosotas lutea sivoka (Evans, 1910) Yunnan
- Prosotas aluta coelestis (Wood-Mason & de Niceville, [1887]) Yunnan
- Prosotas nora ardates (Moore, 1874) Yunnan
- Prosotas pia marginata Tite, 1963 Yunnan
- Prosotas bhutea bhutea (de Niceville, [1884]) Yunnan
- Prosotas dubiosa indica (Evans, 1925) Yunnan

genus: Protantigius

- Protantigius superans (Oberthür, 1914) Central China

genus: Pseudozizeeria

- Pseudozizeeria maha (Kollar, [1844])

P. m. maha (Kollar, [1844]) South China
P. m. diluta (C. & R. Felder, [1865]) Yunnan

genus: Qinorapala

- Qinorapala qinlingana Chou et Wang, 1995

genus: Rapala

- Rapala arata (Bremer, 1861) Amur, Ussuri, Northeast China
- Rapala caerulea (Bremer & Grey, [1851]) Northeast China, Central China
- Rapala suffusa (Moore, 1878)
- Rapala dieneces (Hewitson, 1878)
- Rapala manea (Hewitson, 1863)
- Rapala varuna (Horsfield, [1829])

R. v. orseis (Hewitson, 1863) Yunnan

- Rapala nissa (Kollar, [1844]) West China

R. n. ranta Swinhoe, 1897 Tibet

- Rapala micans (Bremer & Grey, 1853) North China

R. m. haniae Huang, 2001 Yunnan

- Rapala subpurpurea Leech, 1890 West China (Sichuan, Guizhou), Central China
- Rapala nemorensis Oberthür, 1914 West China, Tibet
- Rapala bomiensis Lee, 1979 Tibet
- Rapala rectivitta (Moore, 1879) Yunnan
- Rapala catena South, 1913 Tibet
- Rapala selira (Moore, 1874)
- Rapala pheretima (Hewitson, 1863)
- Rapala refulgens de Nicéville, 1891
- Rapala scintilla de Nicéville, 1890
- Rapala iarbus (Fabricius, 1787)
- Rapala takasagonis Matsumura, 1929 Taiwan
- Rapala repercussa Leech, 1890 Chang Yang
- Rapala donganensis (Wang & Li, 2002)

genus: Ravenna

- Ravenna nivea (Nire, 1920)

R. n. nivea (Nire, 1920) Taiwan
R. n. howarthi Saigusa, 1993 Fujian
R. n. koiwayai Yoshino, 1997 Sichuan

genus: Remelana

- Remelana jangala (Horsfield, [1829])

R. j. ravata (Moore, [1866]) South Yunnan
R. j. mudra (Fruhstorfer, 1907) Hong Kong
R. j. hainanensis (Joicey & Talbot, 1922) Hainan

genus: Rimisia

- Rimisia miris (Staudinger, 1881) Northwest China

genus: Saigusaozephyrus

- Saigusaozephyrus atabyrius (Oberthür, 1914)

genus: Satyrium

- Satyrium herzi (Fixsen, 1887) Amur, Ussuri, Northeast China
- Satyrium spini (Schiffermüller, 1775)
- Satyrium pruni (Linnaeus, 1758)

S. p. jezoensis (Matsumura, 1919) Amur, Ussuri

- Satyrium latior (Fixsen, 1887) North China
- Satyrium w-album (Knoch, 1782) Northeast China

S. w. sutchani Tutt, 1907 Amur, Ussuri

- Satyrium eximia (Fixsen, 1887) Northeast China, Central China

S. e. eximia (Fixsen, 1887) Ussuri
S. e. zhejianganum Tong, 1994 Zhejiang

- Satyrium prunoides (Staudinger, 1887) Northeast China, Amur, Ussuri
- Satyrium thalia (Leech, [1893]) Central China
- Satyrium acaudata Staudinger, 1901 Tian Shan
- Satyrium xumini Huang, 2001 Sichuan-Tibet border
- Satyrium percomis (Leech, 1894) West China
- Satyrium patrius (Leech, 1891) West China
- Satyrium v-album (Oberthür, 1886) West China
- Satyrium ornata (Leech, 1890) Central China, West China
- Satyrium persimilis (Riley, 1939) West China, Yunnan
- Satyrium dejeani (Riley, 1939) West China
- Satyrium oenone Leech, [1893]

S. o. oenone Leech, [1893] West China, Tibet
S. o. minyonensis (Yoshino, 1999) North Yunnan
S. o. benzilanensis (Yoshino, 1999) Sichuan

- Satyrium phyllodendri (Elwes, [1882]) Amur
- Satyrium grandis (C. & R. Felder, 1862) North China, East China
- Satyrium rubicundula (Leech, 1890) West China
- Satyrium yangi (Riley, 1939) Kwantung
- Satyrium kuboi (Chou & Tong, 1994) Zhejiang
- Satyrium minshanicum Murayama, 1992 China
- Satyrium neoeximia Murayama, 1992 Yunnan
- Satyrium kongmingi Murayama, 1992 China
- Satyrium pseudopruni Murayama, 1992 China
- Satyrium volt (Sugiyama, 1993) China
- Satyrium redae Bozano, 1993 China
- Satyrium formosana (Matsumura, 1910)
- Satyrium tanakai (Shirôzu, 1942)
- Satyrium austrina (Murayama, 1943)
- Satyrium inouei (Shirôzu, 1959)
- Satyrium watarii (Matsumura, 1927)
- Satyrium esakii (Shirôzu, 1941)
- Satyrium lais (Leech, 1892)
- Satyrium iyonis (Oxta and Kusunoki, 1957)
- Satyrium siguniangshanicum Murayama, 1992
- Satyrium tamikoae Koiwaya, 2002 Zhejiang

genus: Scolitantides

- Scolitantides orion (Pallas, 1771)

S. o. orion (Pallas, 1771)
S. o. johanseni (Wnukowsky, 1934) Tian Shan
S. o. jezoensis (Matsumura, 1919) Amur, Ussuri
S. t. pauper Sugiyama, 1994

genus: Shaanxiana

- Shaanxiana takashimai Koiwaya, 1993 Shaanxi

genus: Shijimia

- Shijimia moorei (Leech, 1889)

S. m. moorei South Yunnan
S. m. taiwana Matsumura Taiwan

genus: Shirozua

- Shirozua jonasi (Janson, 1877) Amur, Ussuri, Northeast China
- Shirozua melpomene (Leech, 1890) West China

genus: Sibataniozephyrus

- Sibataniozephyrus kuafui Hsu & Lin, 1994 Taiwan
- Sibataniozephyrus lijinae Hsu, 1995

genus: Sinia

- Sinia lanty (Oberthür, 1886)

S. l. honei (Forster, 1940) West China, Tibet
S. l. pomena Huang, 1998 West Tibet, Southeast Tibet

- Sinia divina (Fixsen, 1887) Amur, Ussuri
- Sinia leechi (Forster, 1940)

genus: Sinocupido

- Sinocupido lokiangensis Lee, 1963 Xinjiang

genus: Sinthusa

- Sinthusa chandrana (Moore, 1882)

S. c. chandrana (Moore, 1882) West China
S. c. grotei (Moore, [1884]) Yunnan

- Sinthusa menglaensis (Wang, 1997) South Yunnan
- Sinthusa rayata Riley, 1939 West China
- Sinthusa zhejiangensis Yoshino, 1995 Zhejiang
- Sinthusa nasaka (Horsfield, [1829])
- Sinthusa rayata Riley, 1939 West China

genus: Spalgis

- Spalgis epius (Westwood, 1852)

S. e. epius (Westwood, 1852) South Yunnan
S. e. dilama (Moore, 1878) Taiwan

genus: Subsolanoides

- Subsulanoides nagata Koiwaya, 1989

genus: Surendra

- Surendra quercetorum (Moore, [1858])

S. q. quercetorum (Moore, [1858]) South Yunnan

- Surendra vivarna (Horsfield, [1829])

genus: Tajuria

- Tajuria caerulea Nire, 1920
- Tajuria cippus (Fabricius, 1798)

T.c. malcolmi Riley & Godfrey Hainan
T. c. maxentius Fruhstorfer, 1912

- Tajuria diaeus (Hewitson, 1865)

T. d. karenkonis Matsumura, 1929 Taiwan

- Tajuria gui Chou & Wang, 1994 Hainan
- Tajuria illurgis (Hewitson, 1869)

T. i. illurgis (Hewitson, 1869) Yunnan
T. i. tattaka (Araki, 1949) Taiwan

- Tajuria luculentus (Leech, 1890)

T. l. luculentus (Leech, 1890) West China
T. l. taorana Corbet, 1940

- Tajuria maculata (Hewitson, 1865)
- Tajuria nanlingana Wang & Fan, 2002

genus: Taraka

- Taraka hamada (Druce, 1875) West China, Central China

T. h. mendesia Fruhstorfer, 1918 Yunnan

- Taraka shiloi Tamai & Guo, 2001 Sichuan

genus: Tarucus

- Tarucus theophrastus (Fabricius, 1793)

genus: Teratozephyrus

- Teratozephyrus arisanus (Wileman, 1909)

T. a. arisanus (Wileman, 1909) Taiwan
T. a. picquenardi (Oberthür, 1914) Yunnan

- Teratozephyrus zhejiangensis Chou & Tong, 1994 Zhejiang
- Teratozephyrus hecale (Leech, 1894)

T. h. hecale (Leech, 1894) West China, Tibet
T. h. yugaii (Kano, 1928) Taiwan

- Teratozephyrus tsukiyamahiroshii Fujioka, 1994
- Teratozephyrus hinomaru Fujioka, 1994
- Teratozephyrus chibahieyukii Fujioka, 1994
- Teratozephyrus tsangkie (Oberthür, 1886)
- Teratozephyrus nuwai Koiwaya, 1996
- Teratozephyrus florianii Bozano, 1996

genus: Thaduka

- Thaduka multicaudata Moore, 1878

genus: Thecla

- Thecla betulae (Linnaeus, 1758)

T. b. betulae (Linnaeus, 1758) Amur, Ussuri
T. b. crassa Leech, 1894 Ussuri
T. b. elwesi Leech, 1890 West China, Central China
T. b. yiliguozigounae Huang & Murayama, 1992 Xinjiang

- Thecla betulina Staudinger, 1887 Ussuri, Amur, Northeast China
- Thecla ohyai Fujioka, 1994 Lijiang, Yunnan.

genus: Thermozephyrus

- Thermozephyrus ataxus (Westwood, 1851)

T. a. zulla (Tytler, 1915) West China

genus: Ticherra

- Ticherra acte (Moore, [1858])

T. a. retracta Cowan, 1967 Hainan

genus: Tomares

- Tomares fedtschenkoi Erschoff, 1874

genus: Tongeia

- Tongeia fischeri (Eversmann, 1843) Northeast China, China

T. f. dea Zhdanko, 2000Amur

- Tongeia filicaudis (Pryer, 1877) North China, West China
- Tongeia ion (Leech, 1891) Sichuan, Tibet

T. i. ion (Leech, 1891) Sichuan, Yunnan
T. i. cratylus (Fruhstorfer, 1915)
T. i. cellariusi (Bollow, 1930) Gansu (Qinling Mountains)

- Tongeia amplifascia Huang, 2001 Tibet
- Tongeia pseudozuthus Huang, 2001 Tibet
- Tongeia confusa Huang, 2003 Yunnan
- Tongeia zuthus (Leech, [1893]) Sichuan, Tibet
- Tongeia menpae Huang, 1998 Tibet
- Tongeia davidi (Poujade, 1884) West China
- Tongeia potanini (Alphéraky, 1889) Central China, Tibet

T. p. potanini (Alphéraky, 1889) South China, Central China, Tibet

- Tongeia bella Huang, 2001 Tibet
- Tongeia arcana (Leech, 1890) Changyang
- Tongeia hainani (Bethune-Baker, 1914) Hainan

genus: Udara

- Udara dilectus (Moore, 1879)

U. d. dilectus (Moore, 1879) West China, Central China

- Udara albocaerulea (Moore, 1879)

U. a. albocaerulea (Moore, 1879) Yunnan
U. a. sauteri (Fruhstorfer, 1917) Taiwan

genus: Una

- Una usta (Distant, 1886) Hainan, South Yunnan

genus: Ussuriana

- Ussuriana michaelis (Oberthür, 1880) East China

U. m. michaelis (Oberthür, 1880) Ussuri, Northeast China

- Ussuriana igarashii Wang & Owada, 2009 Guangxi
- Ussuriana takarana (Araki & Hirayama, 1941) Taiwan
- Ussuriana fani Koiwaya, 1993
- Ussuriana takarana (Araki & Hirayama, 1941) Taiwan
- Ussuriana choui Wang et Fan, 2000
- Ussuriana plania Wang et Ren, 1999

genus: Wagimo

- Ussuriana fani Koiwaya, 1993
- Ussuriana takarana (Araki & Hirayama, 1941) Taiwan
- Wagimo signata (Butler, [1882]) Northeast China, Central China

W. s. quercivora (Staudinger, 1887) Ussuri

- Wagimo sulgeri (Oberthür, 1908) West China

genus: Yamamotozephyrus

- Yamamotozephyrus kwangtungensis (Forster, 1942)

Y. k. hainana (Koiwaya, 1993) Hainan

genus: Yasoda

- Yasoda tripunctata (Hewitson, 1863)

Y. t. tripunctata (Hewitson, 1863) South Yunnan
Y. t. atrinotata Fruhstorfer, 1912 South China

- Yasoda androconifera Fruhstorfer, 1912 South Yunnan

genus: Zeltus

- Zeltus amasa (Hewitson, 1865)

Z. a. amasa (Hewitson, 1865) South Yunnan

genus: Zinaspa

- Zinaspa zana de Nicéville, 1898 Western China
- Zinaspa distorta (de Nicéville, 1887)
- Zinaspa todara (Moore, [1884])

Z. t. karennia (Evans, 1925) Yunnan

- Zinaspa youngi Hsu & Johnson, 1998 South China, Guangdong, Nanling National Reserve.
- Zinaspa isshiki Koiwaya 1989

genus: Zizeeria

- Zizeeria knysna (Trimen, 1862)

Z. k. serica (Felder, 1862) Hong Kong

- Zizeeria karsandra (Moore, 1865)

genus: Zizina

- Zizina otis (Fabricius, 1787)

genus: Zizula

- Zizula hylax (Fabricius, 1775)

Z. h. hylax (Fabricius, 1775)
