= List of lycaenid genera: S =

The large butterfly family Lycaenidae contains the following genera starting with the letter S:

- Sahulana
- Saigusaozephyrus
- Salazaria
- Sancterila
- Satyrium
- Scolitantides
- Semanga
- Semonina
- Shaanxiana
- Shijimia
- Shijimiaeoides
- Shirozua
- Sibataniozephyrus
- Siderus
- Sidima
- Simiskina
- Sinia
- Sinocupido
- Sinthusa
- Sipaea
- Sithon
- Spalgis
- Stempfferia
- Sterosis
- Strephonota
- Strymon
- Stugeta
- Suasa
- Subsolanoides
- Sukidion
- Surendra
- Symbiopsis
- Syrmoptera
