= List of lycaenid genera: L =

The large butterfly family Lycaenidae contains the following genera starting with the letter L:

- Lachnocnema
- Laeosopis
- Lamasina
- Lampides
- Lamprospilus
- Laothus
- Larinopoda
- Lathecla
- Lepidochrysops
- Leptomyrina
- Leptotes
- Lestranicus
- Leucantigius
- Lipaphnaeus
- Liphyra
- Liptena
- Liptenara
- Lithodryas
- Logania
- Lontalius
- Loxura
- Lucia
- Luthrodes
- Lycaena
- Lycaenopsis
- Lysandra
