= List of lycaenid genera: Y =

The large butterfly family Lycaenidae contains the following genera starting with the letter Y:

- Yamamotozephyrus
- Yasoda
- Yuhbae
