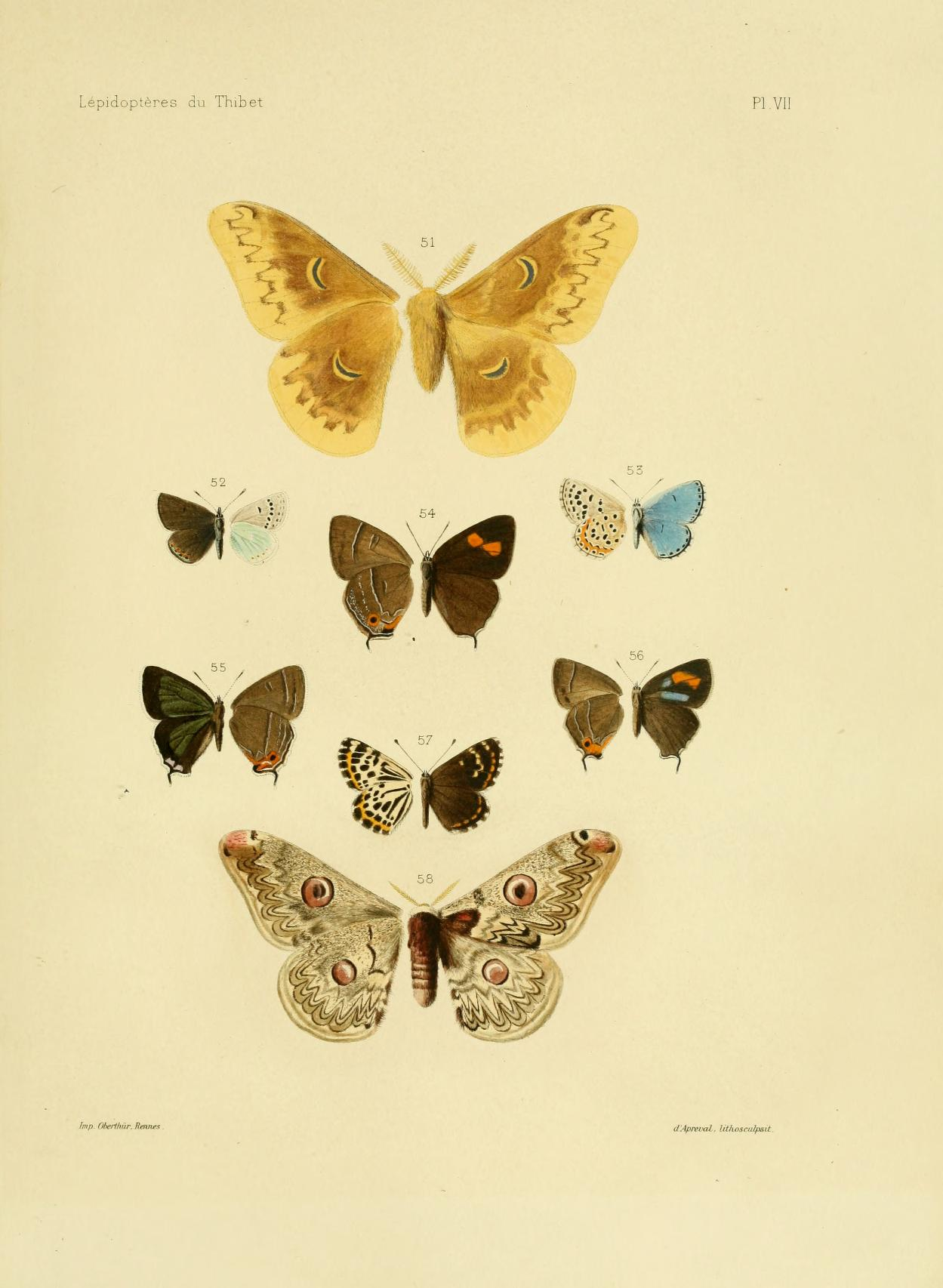
- as Thecla tsangkie in Oberthur Études d'entomologie (figure 55 male, 56 female )

Scientific classification
- Domain: Eukaryota
- Kingdom: Animalia
- Phylum: Arthropoda
- Class: Insecta
- Order: Lepidoptera
- Family: Lycaenidae
- Genus: Teratozephyrus
- Species: T. doni

Binomial name
- Teratozephyrus doni (Tytler, 1915)

Synonyms
- Teratozephyrus tsangkie Oberthür, 1886

= Teratozephyrus doni =

Suroifui hairstreak

Species of butterfly

Teratozephyrus doni, the suroifui hairstreak, is a small butterfly found in India that belongs to the lycaenids or blues family.

== Taxonomy ==
The butterfly was previously classified as Thecla doni Tytler.

== Range ==
The butterfly occurs in India in Manipur.

== Status ==
Very rare.

== See also ==
- List of butterflies of India (Lycaenidae)
