= Ravenna (butterfly) =

Scientific classification
- Kingdom: Animalia
- Phylum: Arthropoda
- Clade: Pancrustacea
- Class: Insecta
- Order: Lepidoptera
- Family: Lycaenidae
- Tribe: Theclini
- Genus: Ravenna; Shirôzu & Yamamoto, 1956
- Species: R. nivea

Binomial name
- Ravenna nivea (Nire, 1920)

Monotypic butterfly genus in family Lycaenidae

Ravenna is a butterfly genus in the family Lycaenidae. It is monotypic, containing only the species Ravenna nivea found in Sichuan and Taiwan
