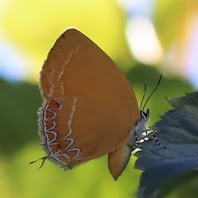
- Cordelia comes wilemaniella

Scientific classification
- Kingdom: Animalia
- Phylum: Arthropoda
- Clade: Pancrustacea
- Class: Insecta
- Order: Lepidoptera
- Family: Lycaenidae
- Tribe: Theclini
- Genus: Cordelia; Shirôzu & Yamamoto, 1956

= Cordelia (butterfly) =

Genus of butterflies

Cordelia is a genus of hairstreak butterflies in the family Lycaenidae. The genus is found in China, with species occurring primarily in temperate regions.

== Species ==
The genus includes the following species:

- Cordelia comes (Leech, 1890) – China
  - C. c. wilemaniella (Matsumura, 1919) – Taiwan
  - C. c. koizumii Koiwaya, 1996
- Cordelia kitawakii Koiwaya, 1996 – China (Sichuan, Dabashan)

 = Pseudogonerilia kitawakii

- Cordelia minerva (Leech, 1890) – China
  - C. m. jinfoshanensis Koiwaya, 2000
