= Arhopala qiongdaoensis =

Scientific classification
- Kingdom: Animalia
- Phylum: Arthropoda
- Class: Insecta
- Order: Lepidoptera
- Family: Lycaenidae
- Genus: Arhopala
- Species: A. qiongdaoensis

Binomial name
- Arhopala qiongdaoensis Chou and Gu, 1994

Species of butterfly

Arhopala qiongdaoensis, the Hainan hairstreak, is a butterfly in the family Lycaenidae. It was discovered by Io Chou and Gu in 1994. It is found in Hainan. This species is monotypic.

== Description ==
This species is similar to A. paramuta. The main differences are that individuals are larger and there are no black and white conjoined spots at the anal angle on the underside of the hindwing.
