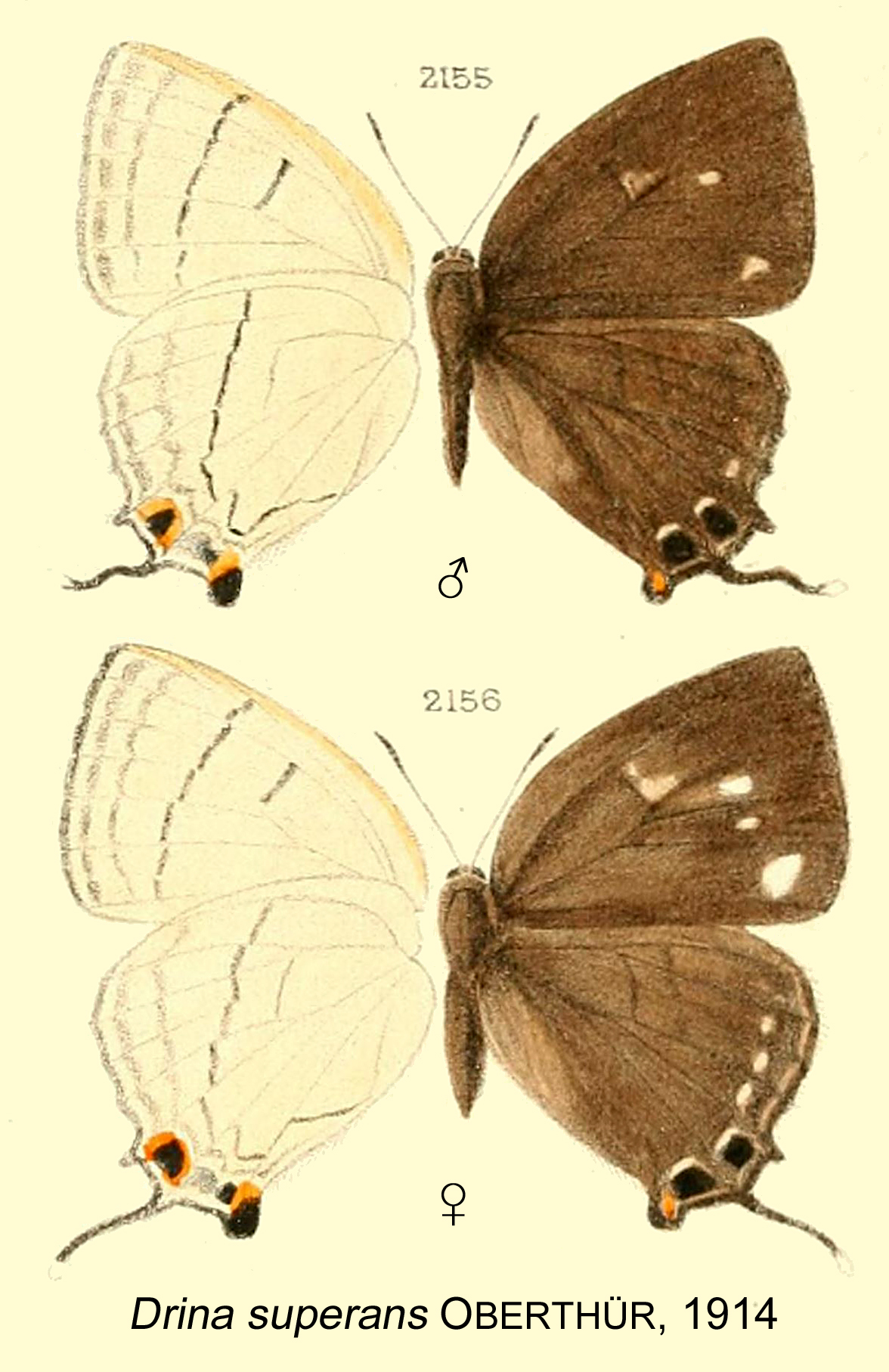
- Illustration accompanying the original description of Protantigius superans, 2155 male, 2156 female

Scientific classification
- Kingdom: Animalia
- Phylum: Arthropoda
- Clade: Pancrustacea
- Class: Insecta
- Order: Lepidoptera
- Clade: Obtectomera
- Superfamily: Papilionoidea
- Family: Lycaenidae
- Genus: Protantigius; Shirôzu & Yamamoto, 1956
- Species: P. superans

Binomial name
- Protantigius superans (Oberthür, 1914)

Synonyms
- Drina superans Oberthür, 1914; Zephyrus ginzii Seok, 1936; Protantigius pugatshuki (Kurentzov, 1970)

= Protantigius =

Monotypic butterfly genus in family Lycaenidae

Protantigius is a monotypic butterfly genus in the family Lycaenidae. Its single species is Protantigius superans found in the Russian Far East (Primorye), north-eastern and central China and on the Korean Peninsula.

The habitat consists of gaps, stream bottomlands and edges of deciduous forests.

Adults are on wing from mid-July to mid-August.

The larvae possibly feed on Fraxinus rhynchophylla, Alunus hirsuta, Populus koreana and/or Salix species.

== Subspecies ==
- Protantigius superans superans
- Protantigius superans ginzii (Seok, 1936) (southern Primorye, Korea)
