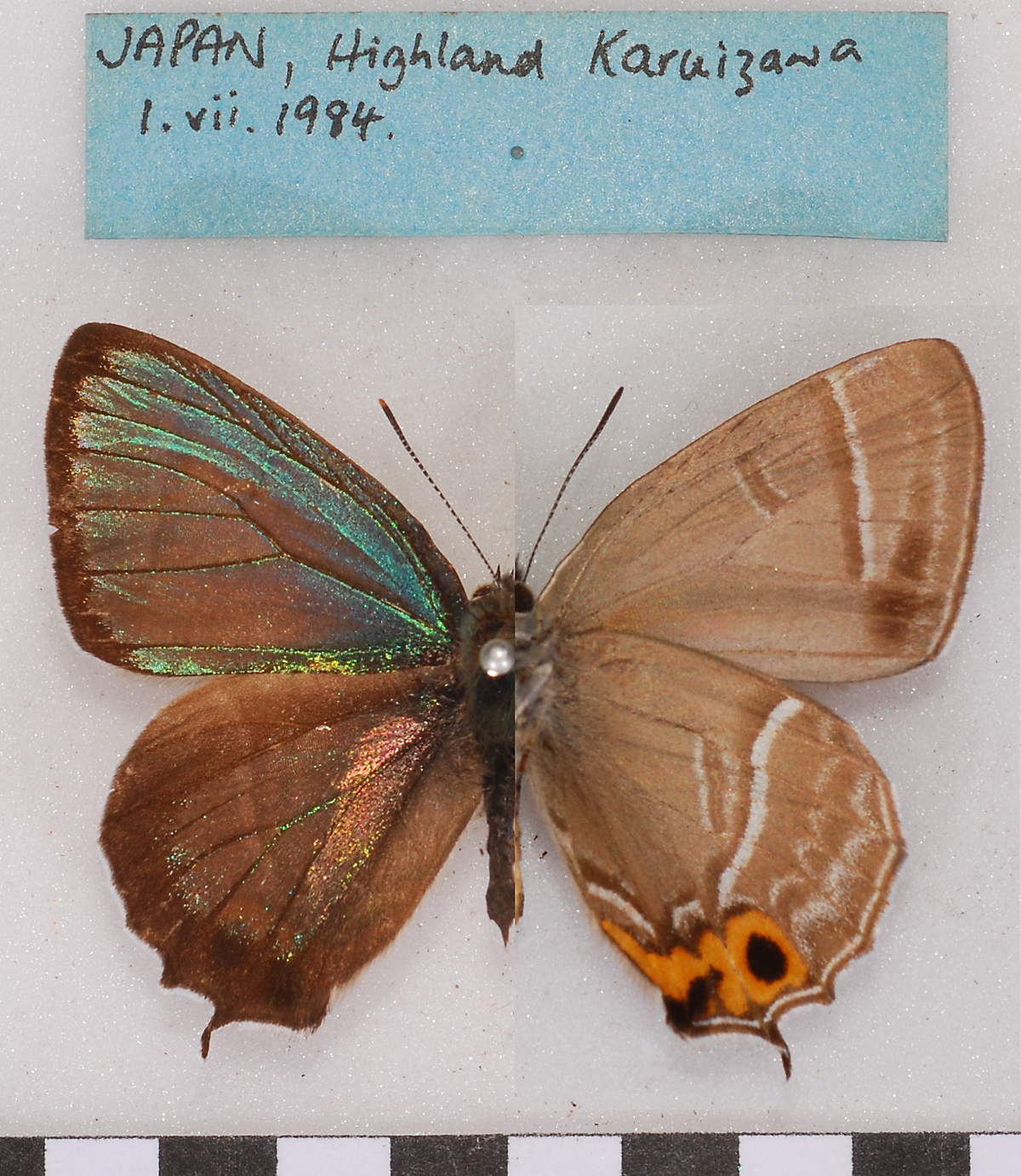

Scientific classification
- Kingdom: Animalia
- Phylum: Arthropoda
- Clade: Pancrustacea
- Class: Insecta
- Order: Lepidoptera
- Family: Lycaenidae
- Genus: Chrysozephyrus
- Species: C. smaragdinus

Binomial name
- Chrysozephyrus smaragdinus (Bremer, 1861)

Synonyms
- Thecla smaragdina Bremer, 1861; Thecla smaragdina Bremer, 1864; Thecla diamantina Oberthür, 1879; Neozephyrus sikongensis Murayama, 1955; Chrysozephyrus abaensis Sugiyama, 1994; Chrysozephyrus leii Chou, 1994; Neozephyrus smaragdinus odakae Watari, 1929; Neozephyrus smaragdinus amoenus Murayama, 1954; Neozephyrus yunnanensis Howarth, 1957; Neozephyrus smaragdinus luxurians Murayama, 1953; Neozephyrus sikongensis Murayama, 1955; Chrysozephyrus luzurianus Murayama, 1953

= Chrysozephyrus smaragdinus =

Species of butterfly

Chrysozephyrus smaragdinus is a small butterfly found in the East Palearctic that belongs to the lycaenids or blues family.

== Subspecies ==
- C. s. smaragdinus Ussuri, China (Shaanxi, Sichuan)
- C. s. abaensis Dantchenko, 2000 China
- C. s. doerriesi Dantchenko, 2000 Sakhalin
- C. s. odakae (Watari, 1929) Japan (Honshu)
- C. s. amoenus (Murayama, 1954) Japan (Honshu)
- C. s. esakii (Umeno, 1937) Japan
- C. s. luxurians (Murayama, 1953) Japan (Honshu)
- C. s. sikongensis (Murayama, 1955) China
- C. s. yunnanensis (Howarth, 1957) West China (N.Yunnan)

== Description from Seitz ==
Z. Smaragdina Brem. As said above, hardly different from brillantina on the upperside, at least no reliable differences have ever been mentioned. Therefore a figure of the upper surface would have been the same as that of brillantina, whose golden gloss does not nearly come up to that of the actual specimens. But the pale, more dust-grey, underside distinguishes it from the preceding species, as also does a transverse line on the hindwing which is placed far proximally from the usual band. However, the main difference lies in the larva, which is yellow instead of brown, with distinctly contrasting black stigma-dots on segments 1 and 4 to 11; on cherry, according to Graeser also on Quercus mongolica, very plentiful in certain years, but a large proportion (90%) infested by Tachina. The butterflies are consequently much rarer than the caterpillars; they fly in July and August and settle on twigs of shrubs at road-sides. — With certainty only known from Amurland and North China; the records from other countries are doubtful, as the insect may possibly have been confounded with other green species.

== Biology ==
The larva feeds on Cerasus glandulosa, Cerasus spp., Prunus spp.( P. sargentii. P. matsumurana, P. verecunda, P. padus, P. jamasakura, P. buergeriana, P. donarium, P. yedoensis, P. subhirtella), Quercus mongolica, Carpinus laxiflora, Celtis sinensis

== See also ==
- List of butterflies of Russia
