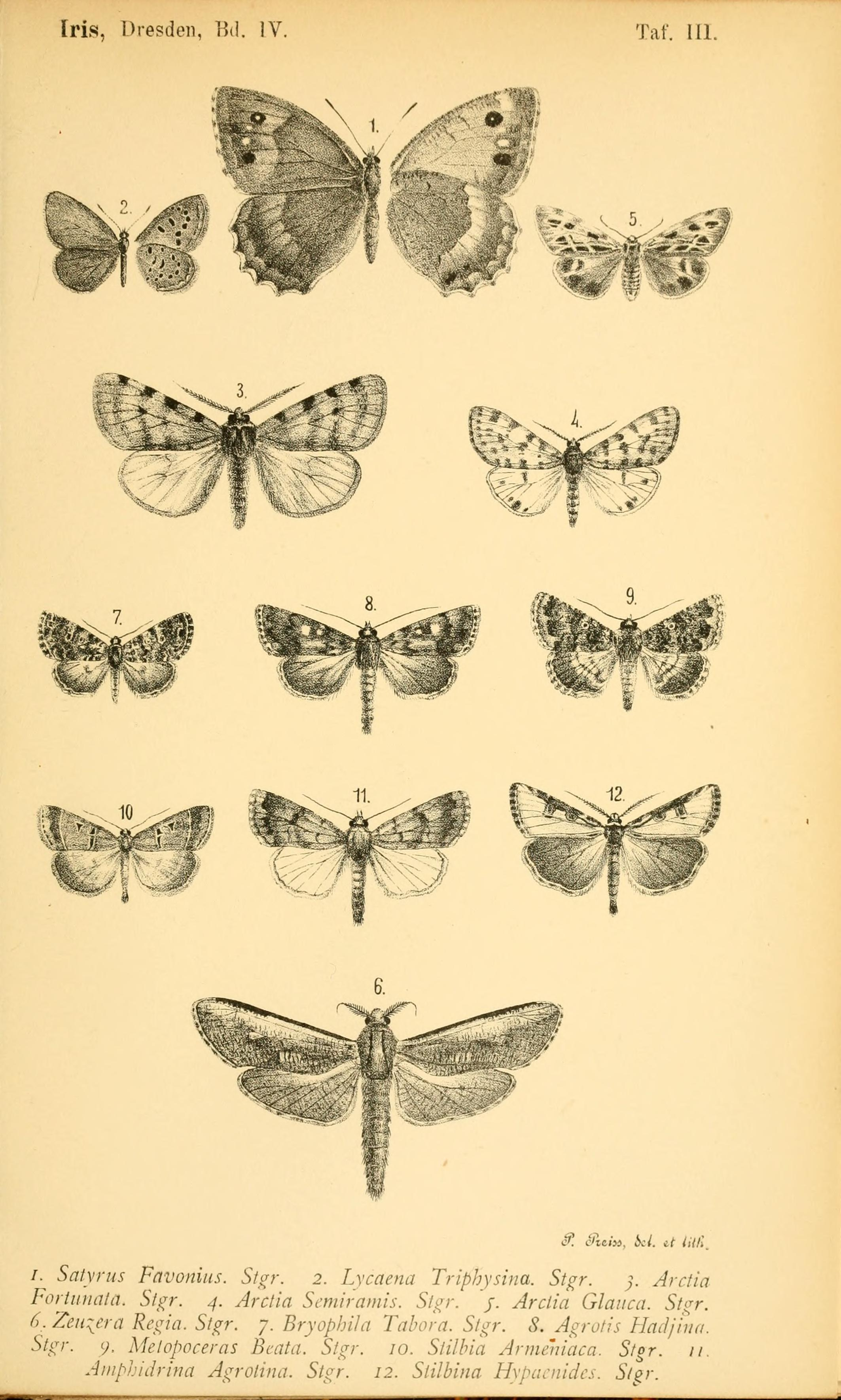
- Staudingers illustration of Lycaena triphysina in Deutsche Entomologische Zeitschrift (figure 2)

Scientific classification
- Domain: Eukaryota
- Kingdom: Animalia
- Phylum: Arthropoda
- Class: Insecta
- Order: Lepidoptera
- Family: Lycaenidae
- Subfamily: Polyommatinae
- Tribe: Polyommatini
- Genus: Palaeophilotes; Forster, 1938
- Species: P. triphysina

Binomial name
- Palaeophilotes triphysina (Staudinger, [1892])

= Palaeophilotes =

Monotypic butterfly genus in family Lycaenidae

Palaeophilotes is a monotypic genus of butterflies in the family Lycaenidae. Its single species, Palaeophilotes triphysina, (Staudinger, 1892) is endemic to western China.

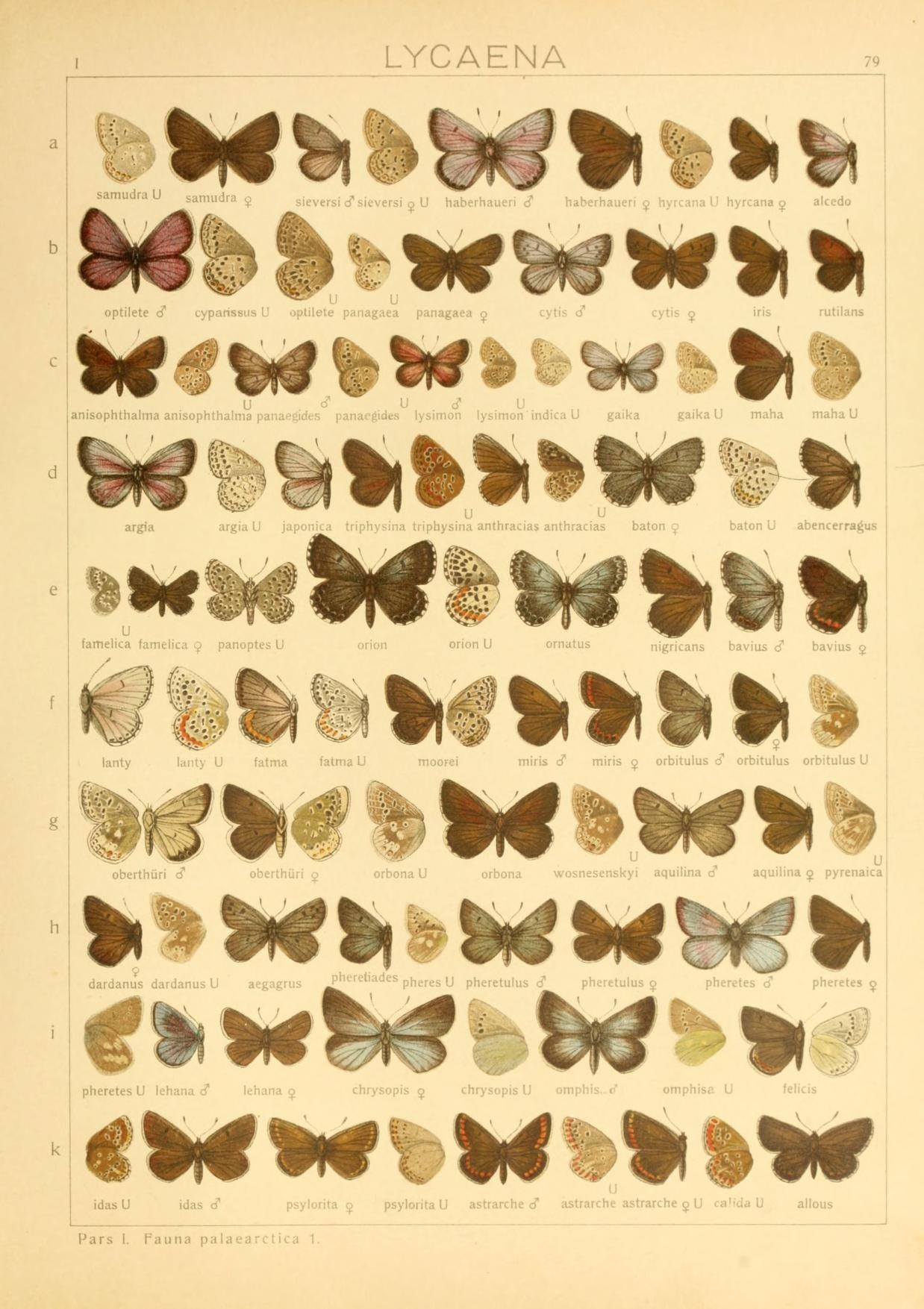
Lycaena triphysina in Seitz (row d)
