= Yuhbae =

Scientific classification
- Kingdom: Animalia
- Phylum: Arthropoda
- Class: Insecta
- Order: Lepidoptera
- Family: Lycaenidae
- Tribe: Theclini
- Genus: Yuhbae

Butterfly genus in family Lycaenidae

Yuhbae is a subgenus of butterflies in the family Lycaenidae.
