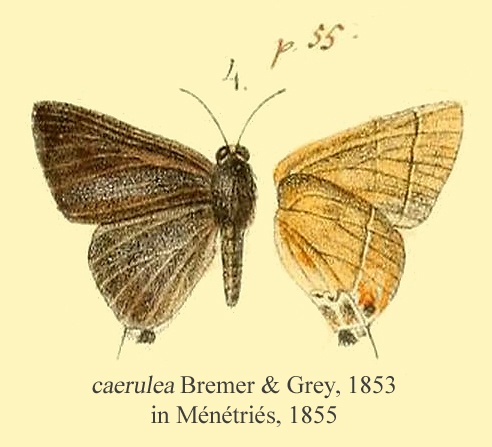

Scientific classification
- Kingdom: Animalia
- Phylum: Arthropoda
- Class: Insecta
- Order: Lepidoptera
- Family: Lycaenidae
- Genus: Rapala
- Species: R. caerulea

Binomial name
- Rapala caerulea (Bremer & Grey, 1851)

Synonyms
- Thecla caerulea Bremer & Grey, [1851]; Thecla betuloides Blanchard, 1871; Atara betuloides

= Rapala caerulea =

Species of butterfly

Rapala caerulea, the bush clover, is a butterfly of the family Lycaenidae. It was described by Otto Vasilievich Bremer and William Grey in 1851. It is found in north-eastern and central China, Taiwan, Korea and the Russian Far East.

The length of the forewings is 16–17 mm. The wings are light blue with a dark border, strongly widened on the forewings of females.

The larvae feed on Rosa multiflora and Rhamnus species.

== Subspecies ==
- Rapala caerulea caerulea
- Rapala caerulea liliacea Nire, 1920 (Taiwan)
