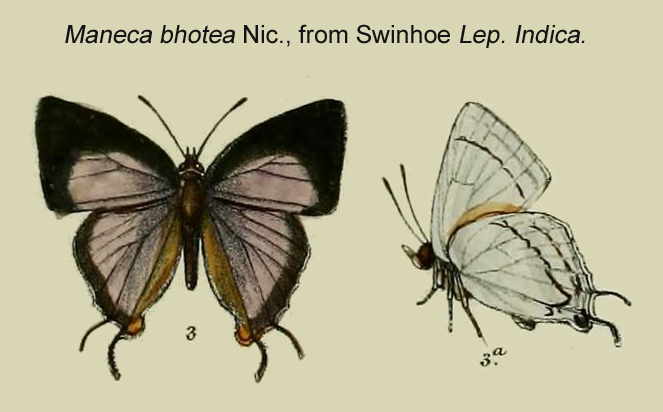

Scientific classification
- Domain: Eukaryota
- Kingdom: Animalia
- Phylum: Arthropoda
- Class: Insecta
- Order: Lepidoptera
- Family: Lycaenidae
- Genus: Maneca de Nicéville, 1890
- Species: M. bhotea

Binomial name
- Maneca bhotea (Moore, 1884)

= Maneca (butterfly) =

Monotypic butterfly genus in family Lycaenidae

Maneca is a butterfly genus in the family Lycaenidae. It is monotypic, containing only the species Maneca bhotea, the slate royal. This is found in Assam and Yunnan (M. b. unnanensis Yoshino, 2001 sic)
