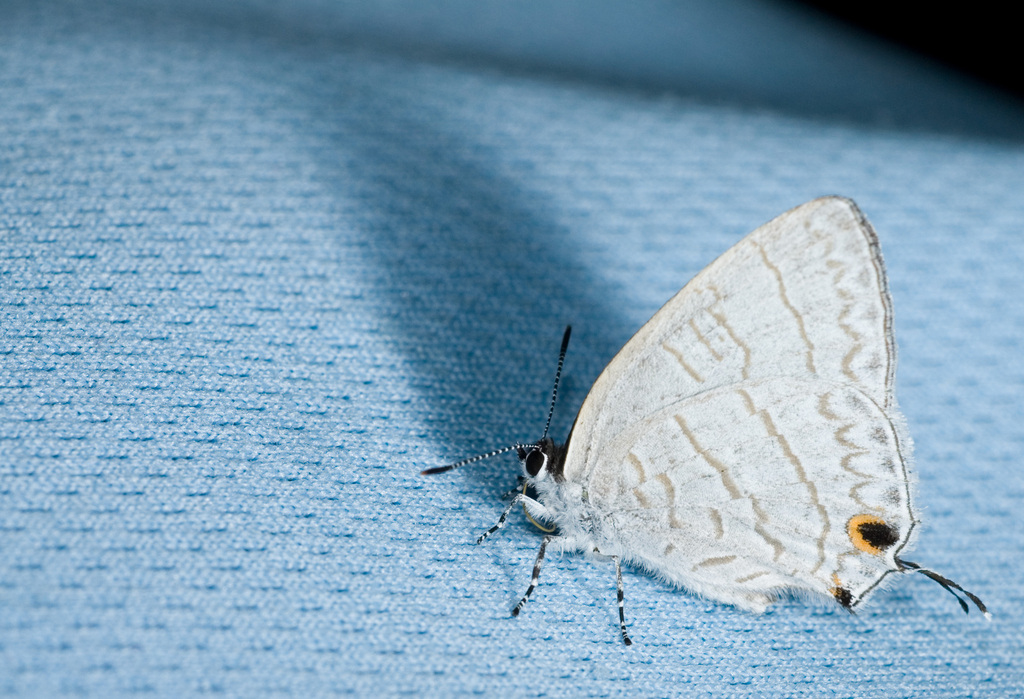

Scientific classification
- Kingdom: Animalia
- Phylum: Arthropoda
- Clade: Pancrustacea
- Class: Insecta
- Order: Lepidoptera
- Family: Lycaenidae
- Tribe: Theclini
- Genus: Leucantigius; Shirôzu & Murayama, 1951
- Species: L. atayalica

Binomial name
- Leucantigius atayalica (Shirôzu & Murayama, 1943)

= Leucantigius =

Monotypic butterfly genus in family Lycaenidae

Leucantigius is a monotypic butterfly genus in the family Lycaenidae. Its only species is Leucantigius atayalica.

The larvae feed on Quercus longinux and Quercus glauca.

== Subspecies ==
- L. a. atayalica Taiwan
- L. a. unicolor Saigusa, 1993 Fujian
- L. a. hainanensis Gu & Wang, 1997 Hainan
- L. a. lamdongensis Saito & Inayoshi 2018 Vietnam
