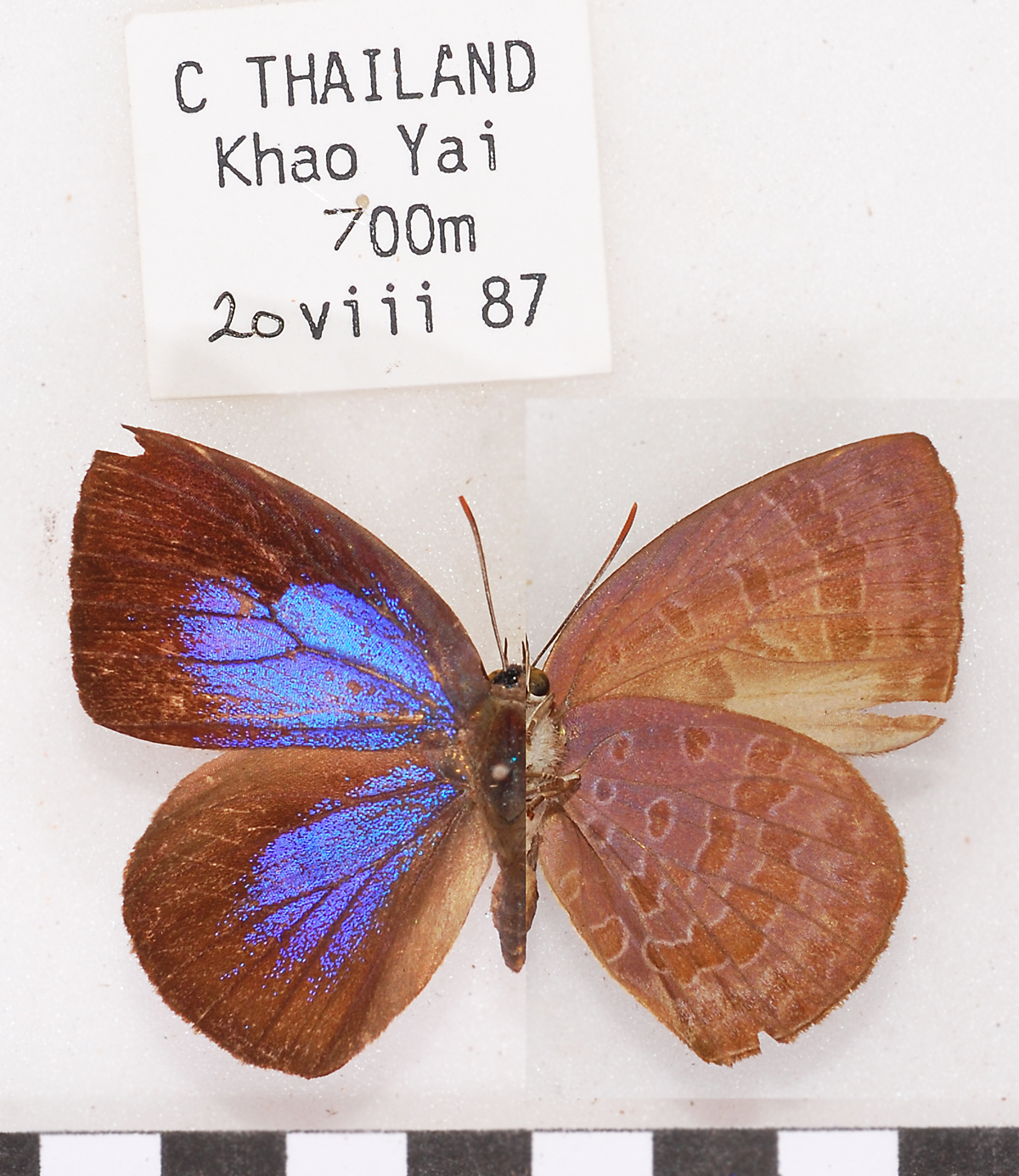

Scientific classification
- Kingdom: Animalia
- Phylum: Arthropoda
- Clade: Pancrustacea
- Class: Insecta
- Order: Lepidoptera
- Family: Lycaenidae
- Genus: Arhopala
- Species: A. arvina

Binomial name
- Arhopala arvina (Hewitson, 1869)

Synonyms
- Amblypodia arvina Hewitson, 1863; Amblypodia arvina ardea Evans, 1932; Arhopala aboe de Nicéville, 1895; Arhopala adala de Nicéville, 1895; Arhopala adulans de Nicéville, 1895; Arhopala adalitas Corbet, 1941

= Arhopala arvina =

Purple-brown tailless oakblue

Species of butterfly

Arhopala arvina, the purple-brown tailless oakblue, is a species of butterfly belonging to the lycaenid family. It was described by William Chapman Hewitson in 1869. It is found in Southeast Asia (Java, Assam, Burma, Mergui, Thailand, Peninsular Malaya, Sumatra and Borneo).

== Description ==
Hindwing quite oval, without small tails. Upper surface in the male lustrous dark ultramarine with a black margin of about 1.5 mm with; female light blue with a marginal band of 4 to 5 mm width. Under surface very characteristic, quite dark violettish-brown, the anal region of the forewing lighter, but not so white as in our figure. In the forewing there are mostly also in and below the cell oval ring-spots which, however, are hardly visible owing to the dark ground-colour.

== Subspecies ==
- Arhopala arvina arvina (Java)
- Arhopala arvina ardea (Evans, 1932) (Assam)
- Arhopala arvina aboe de Nicéville, 1895 (southern Burma, Mergui, southern Thailand)
- Arhopala arvina adalitas Corbet, 1941 (Peninsular Malaysia, Sumatra, Borneo)
