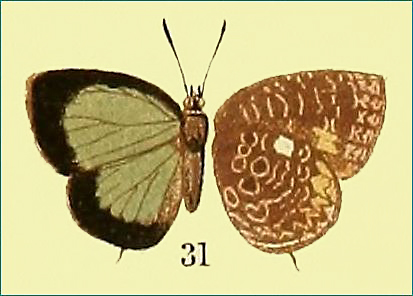

Scientific classification
- Kingdom: Animalia
- Phylum: Arthropoda
- Clade: Pancrustacea
- Class: Insecta
- Order: Lepidoptera
- Family: Lycaenidae
- Genus: Arhopala
- Species: A. ammonides

Binomial name
- Arhopala ammonides (Doherty, 1891)

Synonyms
- Acesina ammonides Doherty, 1891; Arhopala ammon chunsu Fruhstorfer, 1914; Arhopala monava Corbet, 1941; Panchala ammonides bowringi Evans, 1957

= Arhopala ammonides =

Species of butterfly

Arhopala ammonides is a species of butterfly belonging to the lycaenid family described by William Doherty in 1891. It is found in Southeast Asia.

ammonides Doh. (148 h) is the form [of ammon ]from Tenasserim, above with a more lilac tint, in undamaged specimens there is a very fine small tail which, however, breaks off very easily and is also absent in the figured specimen. chunsu Fruhst. is the Sumatran form, the black marginal band above being much broader and in the hindwing extending almost to the cell. hammon Fruhst. from Java [ Arhopala paraganesa ssp. hammon Fruhstorfer, 1914], is larger than the preceding forms and exhibits above a narrower black distal margin.

== Subspecies ==
- A. a. ammonides (Burma, Mergui)
- A. a. elira Corbet, 1941 (Assam)
- A. a. chunsu Fruhstorfer, 1914 (Sumatra, Peninsular Malaya)
- A. a. monava Corbet, 1941 (Langkawi)
- A. a. bowringi (Evans, 1957) (Hainan)
- A. a. kalabakana Eliot, 1972 (Sabah)
- A. a. apurpurosa Barlow, Banks & Holloway, 1971 (Borneo)
