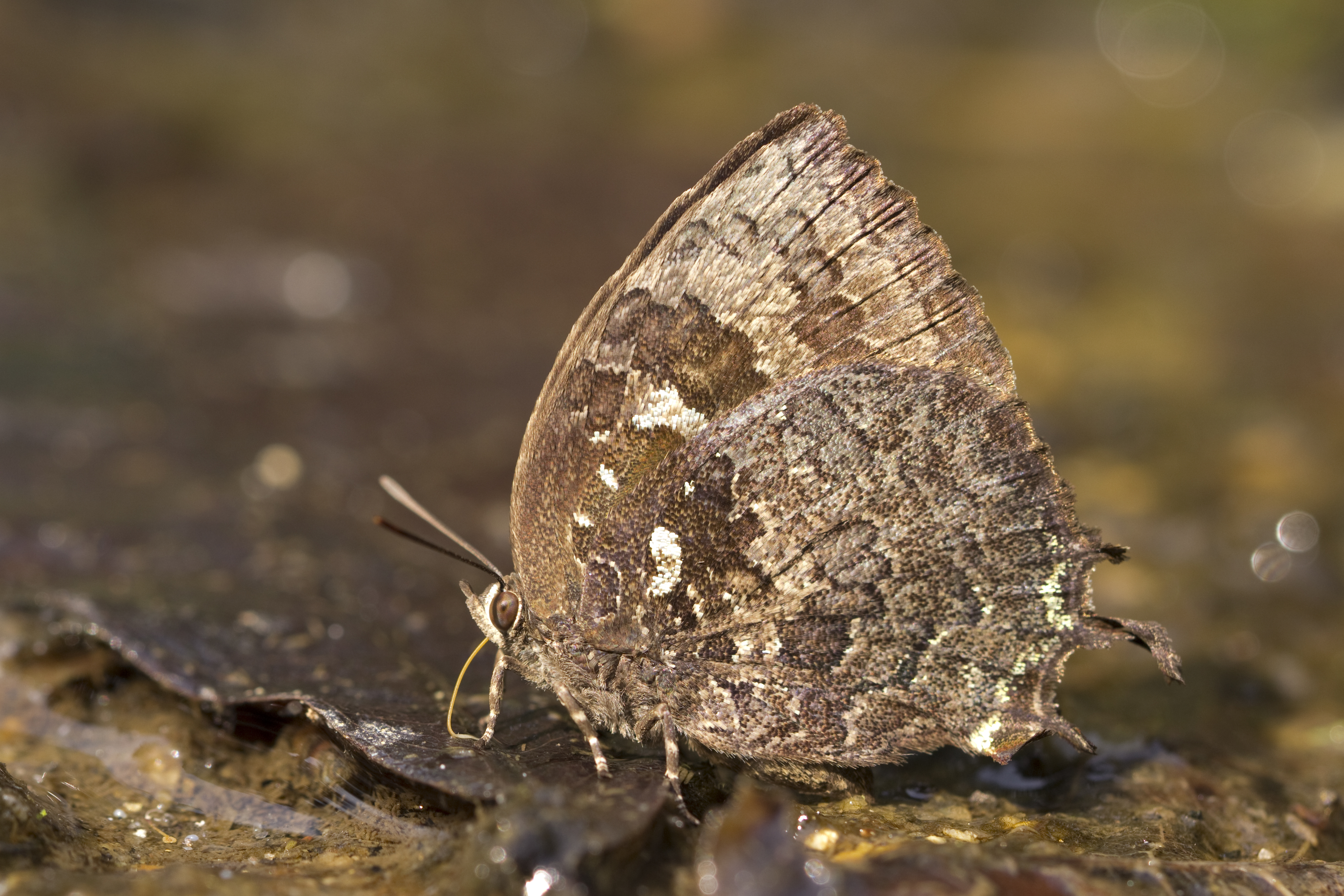

Scientific classification
- Kingdom: Animalia
- Phylum: Arthropoda
- Class: Insecta
- Order: Lepidoptera
- Family: Lycaenidae
- Tribe: Arhopalini
- Genus: Thaduka; Moore, 1879
- Species: T. multicaudata

Binomial name
- Thaduka multicaudata Moore, 1878

= Thaduka =

Monotypic butterfly genus in family Lycaenidae

Thaduka is a genus of butterflies in the family Lycaenidae, the blues. It is monotypic, containing only the species Thaduka multicaudata, the many-tailed oak-blue, which is found in India, Burma and Indochina.

== Description ==
Male. Upperside black, with the basal area smalt-blue or silvery-blue, otherwise the colour of the wings is blue with very broad black borders covering all but the basal, discoidal and sub-median areas. Cilia and tails also black. Underside, dark vinous-brown. Forewing with the outer half and lower portions paler, three blue spots in the basal half of the cell, a larger one at the end with a brown dot inside it, a discal band of six separate square spots, from the costa to vein 2, the first two outwardly oblique, the third outside them, the next three, a little on the inner side of each other, a sub-marginal series of acutely angled marks. Hindwing generally darker than the forewing, with three outwardly curved irregular bands of separated spots with pale edges, ante-medial, medial and discal, often very indistinct; anal area with some bronzy or bluish scales, and a few similar scales near the base and sometimes on other portions of the wing. Female, like the male above and beneath, but on the upperside the blue area is generally paler and less silvery, on the underside the wing is not quite so dark, especially the lower portion of the forewing, the markings are more distinct, and the blue scalings on the hindwing more numerous. Antennae black; palpi black above, the two basal joints grey beneath; head and body black above, brown beneath.

— Charles Swinhoe, Lepidoptera Indica. Vol. VIII

== Gallery ==
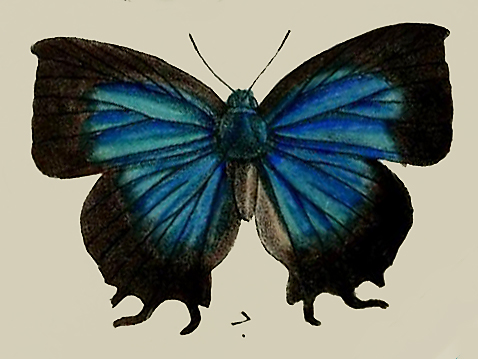

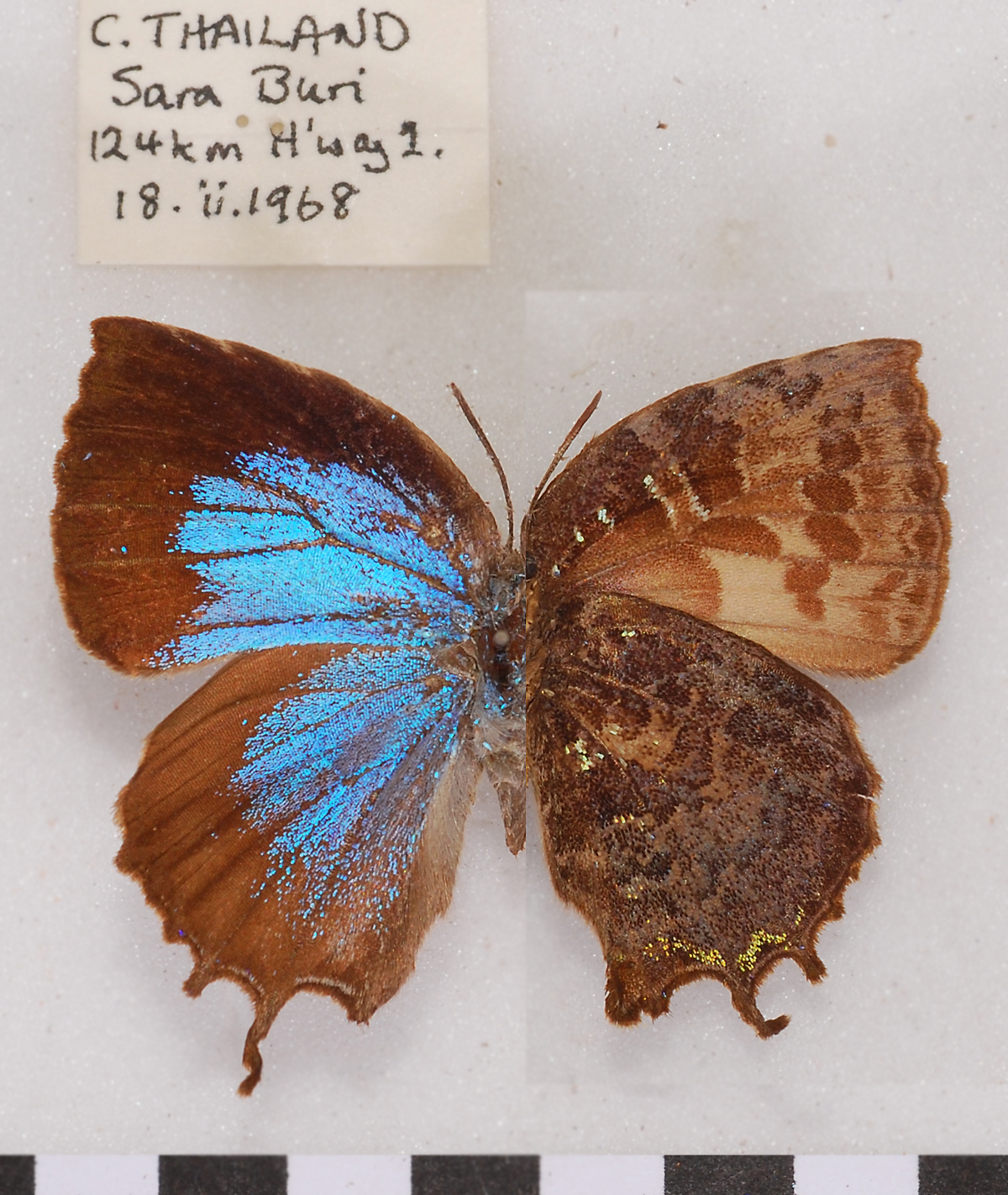
