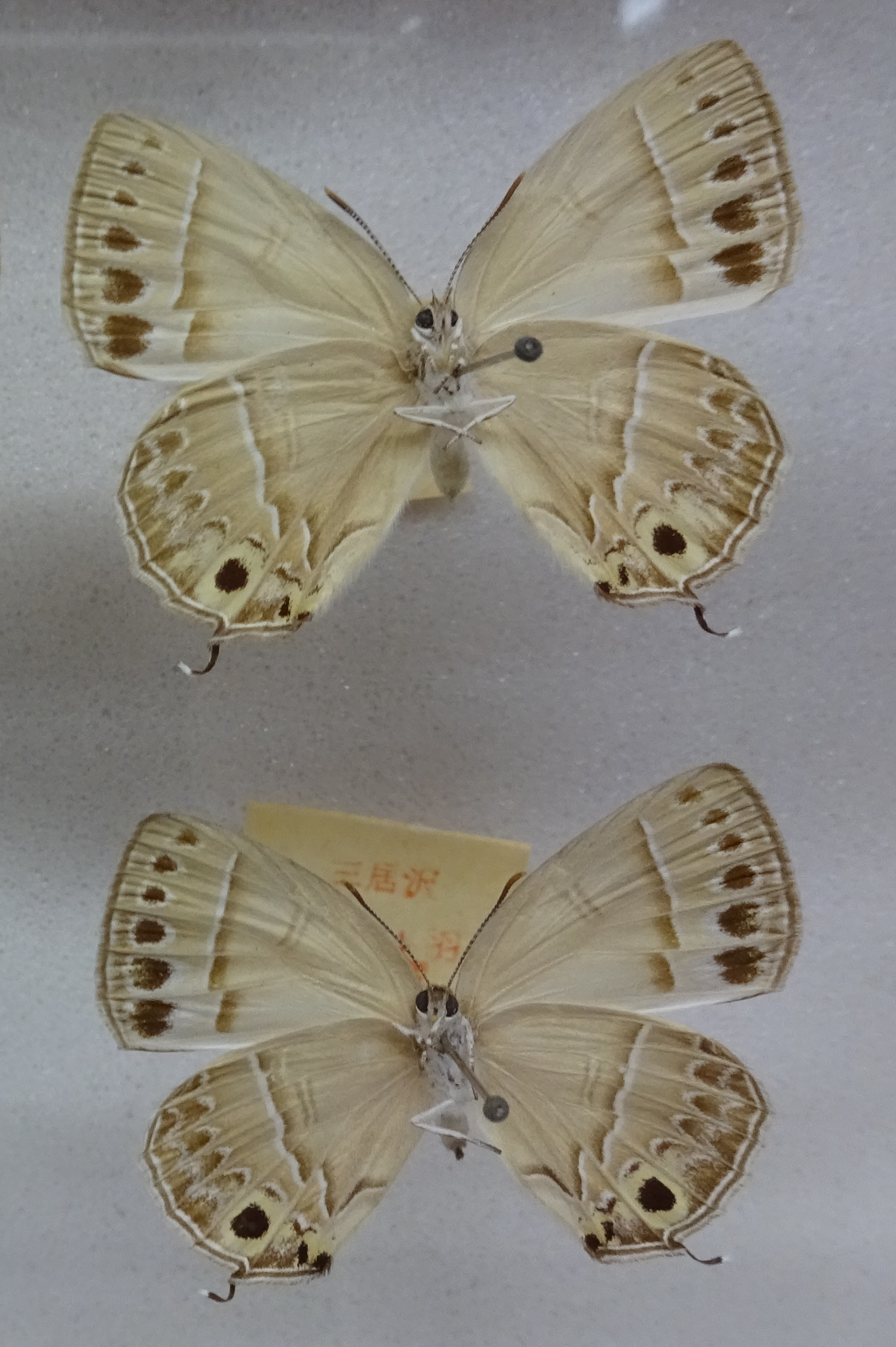

Scientific classification
- Kingdom: Animalia
- Phylum: Arthropoda
- Class: Insecta
- Order: Lepidoptera
- Family: Lycaenidae
- Genus: Iratsume
- Species: I. orsedice

Binomial name
- Iratsume orsedice (Butler, [1882])

Synonyms
- Thecla orsedice Butler, [1882]; Iratsume orsedice kyushensis Fujioka, 1975

= Iratsume =

Monotypic butterfly genus in family Lycaenidae

Iratsume is a monotypic butterfly genus in the family Lycaenidae. Its single species is Iratsume orsedice.

The larvae feed on Hamamelis japonica.

== Subspecies ==
- Iratsume orsedice suzukii (Sonan, 1940) Japan
- Iratsume orsedice nosei Fujioka, 1996 Taiwan
