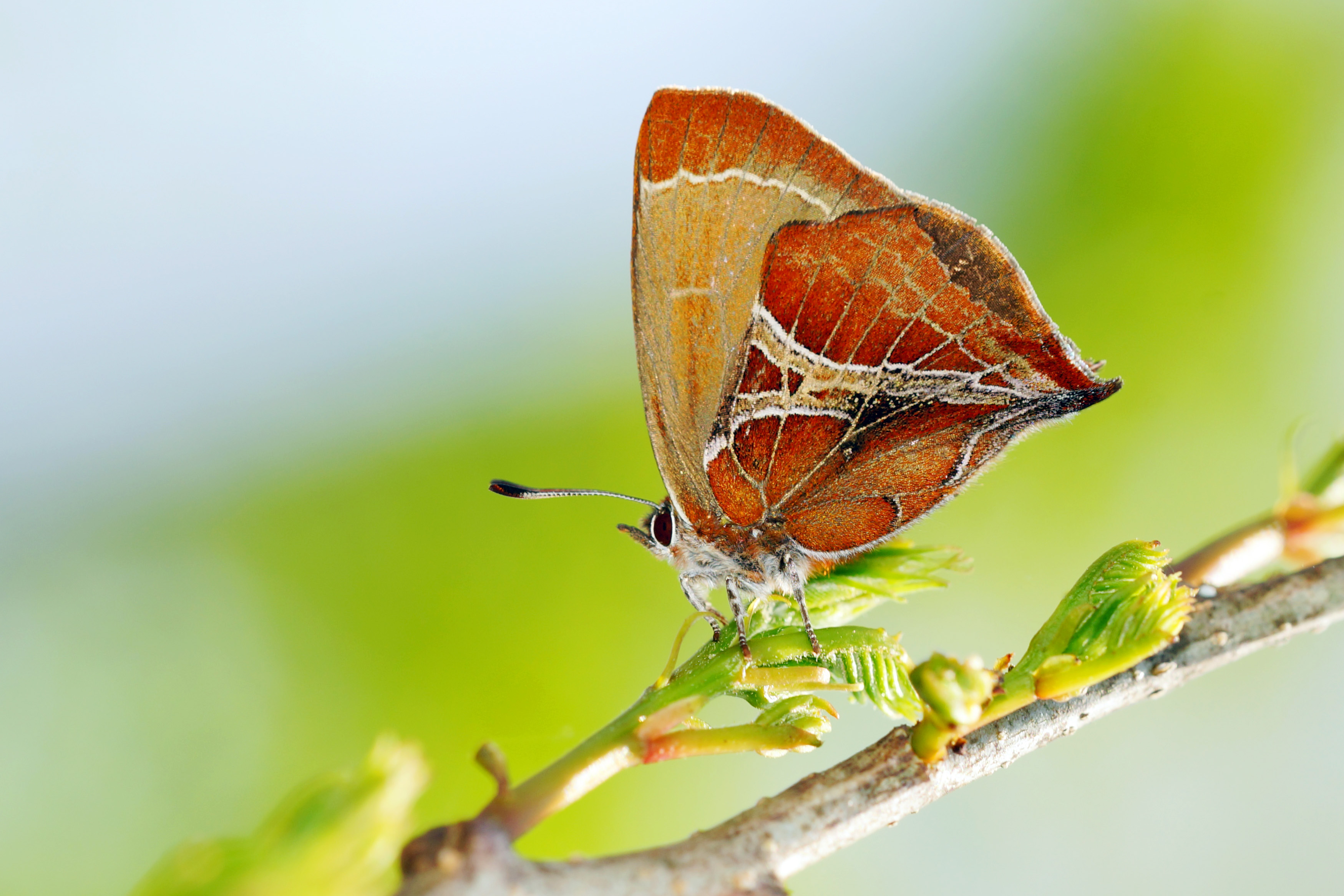
- Amblopala avidiena y-fasciata

Scientific classification
- Kingdom: Animalia
- Phylum: Arthropoda
- Class: Insecta
- Order: Lepidoptera
- Family: Lycaenidae
- Tribe: Theclini
- Genus: Amblopala; Leech, 1893
- Species: A. avidiena

Binomial name
- Amblopala avidiena (Hewitson, 1877)

= Amblopala =

Monotypic butterfly genus in family Lycaenidae

Amblopala is a Palearctic and Indomalayan butterfly genus in the family Lycaenidae. The genus is monotypic containing the single species Amblopala avidiena the Chinese hairstreak. It is a small butterfly found in the Naga Hills of India and in China

In 1909 Adalbert Seitz wrote: "This species was mentioned as a great rarity from China and North India, where it appeared hardly to reach Palaearctic territory. According to a recent communication by the missionary Herr Klapheck the species extends northward to Shantung, where he obtained it repeatedly, though not commonly. The species, therefore, is Palaearctic. Leech characterizes it as being lilac blue on the upperside at the base, the outer half being dark brown with a forked orange spot; hindwing with a tripartite orange spot, anal lobe large and prominent. Female similar, larger."

== See also ==
- List of butterflies of India (Lycaenidae)
