= Chrysozephyrus brillantinus =

- Chrysozephyrus brillantinus in Seitz 73g

Scientific classification
- Kingdom: Animalia
- Phylum: Arthropoda
- Clade: Pancrustacea
- Class: Insecta
- Order: Lepidoptera
- Family: Lycaenidae
- Genus: Chrysozephyrus
- Species: C. brillantinus

Binomial name
- Chrysozephyrus brillantinus (Staudinger, 1887)

Synonyms
- Thecla brillantina Staudinger, 1887; Neozephyrus aurorinus ab. evanidus Murayama, 1947; Thecla aino Matsumura, 1915; Neozephyrus alpinus Murayama, 1954; Neozephryus kansaiensis Murayama, 1954

Species of butterfly

Chrysozephyrus brillantinus is a small butterfly found in the East Palearctic (Ussuri, Northeast China, Korea, Japan) that belongs to the lycaenids or blues family.

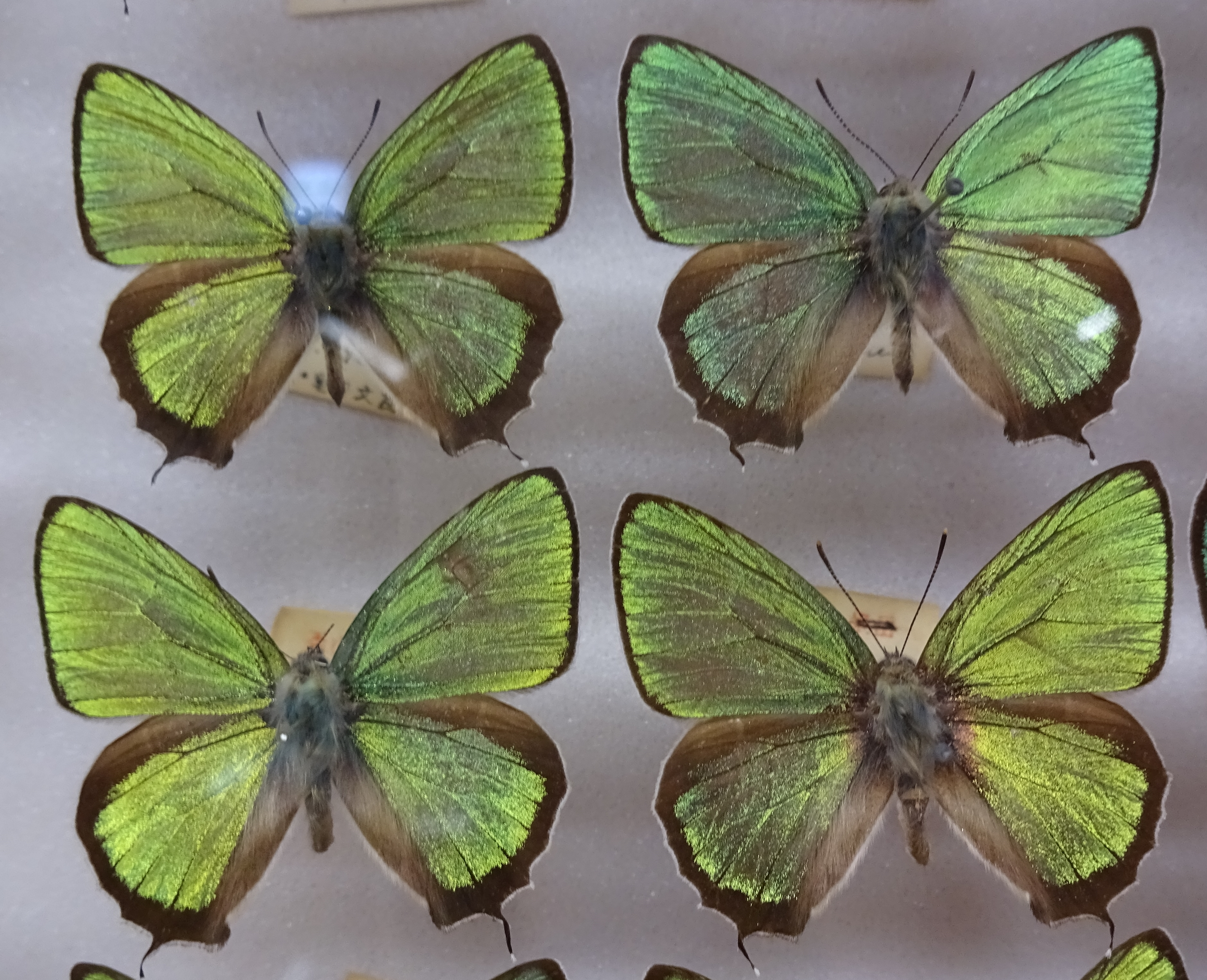
male

== Description from Seitz ==
Z. brillantina Stgr. (= smaragdina Leech) (73 g). At once recognized by the extremely strong golden green gloss of the upperside, which is only present to the same degree in smaragdina, whose upperside is identical with that of brillantina. The black border to the upperside is considerably broader than in the preceding forms. This species differs from smaragdinus in the underside being much darker, so that the markings are less prominent. The females have, as in taxila and the other golden green species, sometimes pale yellow spots on the forewing or some metallic scaling similar to that of the males . — Amur and Ussuri, Vladivostok, Askold and Corea. Larva coppery brown, with a dark dorsal line and on each segment a pale oblique spot, the joints between the segments also being pale; on oak.

== Biology ==
The larva feeds on Quercus mongolica var. grosseserata, Quercus acutissima, Quercus serrata, Quercus dentata, Quercus aliena, Quercus variabilis, Cyclobalanopsis glauca, Pasania sieboldiana

== Subspecies ==
- Chrysozephyrus brillantinus brillantinus (Ussuri, north-eastern China, Korea)
- Chrysozephyrus brillantinus aino (Matsumura, 1915) (Japan: Hokkaido)
- Chrysozephyrus brillantinus alpinus (Murayama, 1954) (Japan: Honshu)
- Chrysozephyrus brillantinus kansaiensis (Murayama, 1954) (Japan: Honshu)
- Chrysozephyrus brillantinus jankowskii (Seits, 1908)
- Chrysozephyrus brillantinus hecalina (Bryk, 1946) (Korea)

== See also ==
- List of butterflies of Russia
