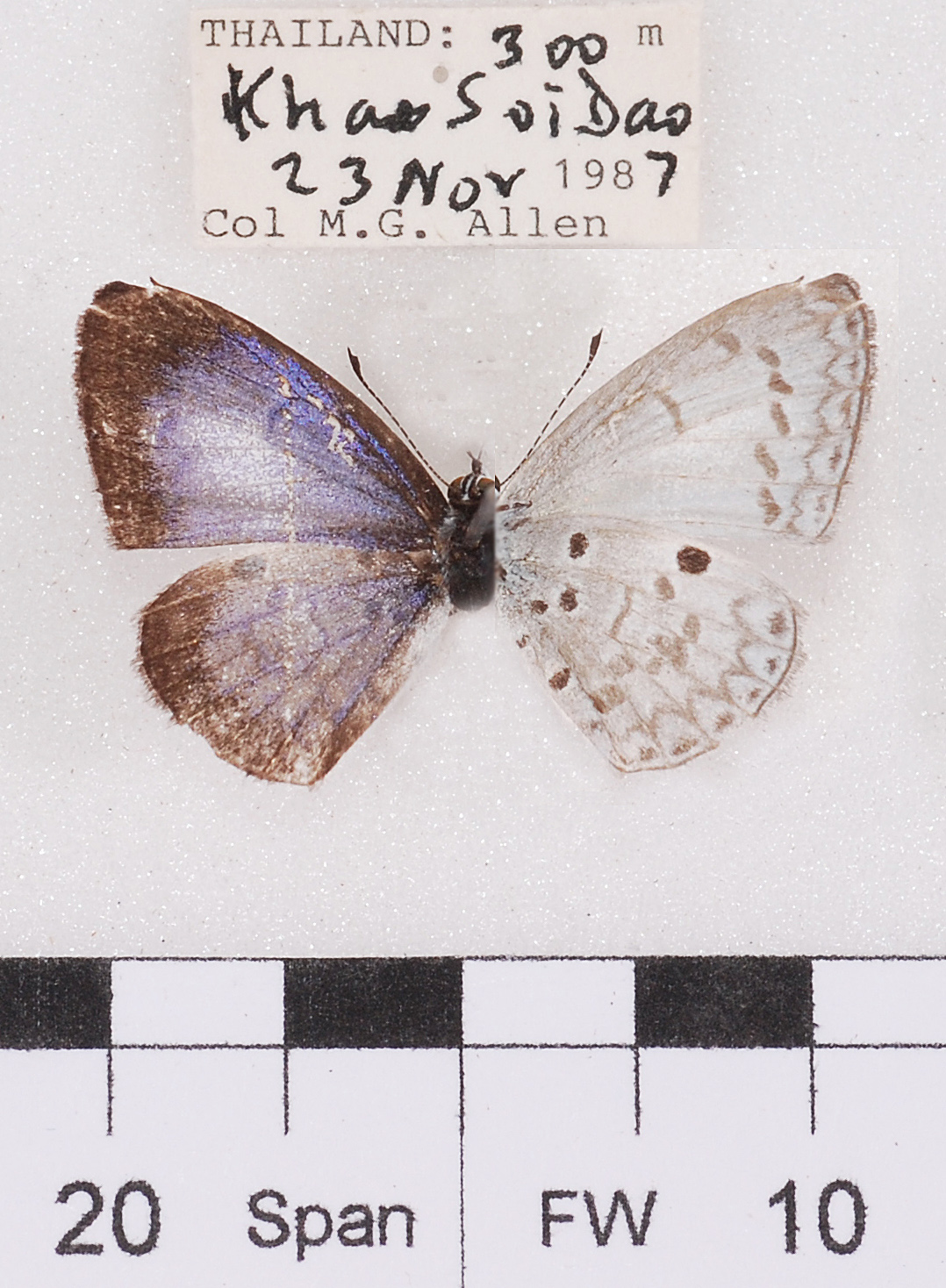
- Lestranicus transpectus

Scientific classification
- Domain: Eukaryota
- Kingdom: Animalia
- Phylum: Arthropoda
- Class: Insecta
- Order: Lepidoptera
- Family: Lycaenidae
- Subfamily: Polyommatinae
- Tribe: Polyommatini
- Genus: Lestranicus; Eliot & Kawazoé, 1983

= Lestranicus =

Butterfly genus in family Lycaenidae

Lestranicus is a genus of butterflies in the family Lycaenidae. The genus was erected by John Nevill Eliot and Akito Kawazoe in 1983. The two species of this genus are found in the Indomalayan realm and the bordering Palearctic realm.

== Species ==
- Lestranicus transpectus (Moore, 1879) – white-banded hedge blue (Sikkim to Myanmar, Thailand, Vietnam and China)
- Lestranicus yoshidai Eliot & Kawazoé, 1983 (Philippines)
