= Shaanxiana =

Scientific classification
- Kingdom: Animalia
- Phylum: Arthropoda
- Class: Insecta
- Order: Lepidoptera
- Family: Lycaenidae
- Tribe: Theclini
- Genus: Shaanxiana; Koiwaya, 1993
- Species: S. takashimai

Binomial name
- Shaanxiana takashimai Koiwaya, 1993

Monotypic butterfly genus in family Lycaenidae

Shaanxiana is a butterfly genus in the family Lycaenidae. It is monotypic, containing only the species Shaanxiana takashimai which is found in Shaanxi, China. Shaanxiana takashimai contains the subspecies S. t. pauper Sugiyama, 1994 from Mount Siguniang, Sichuan
