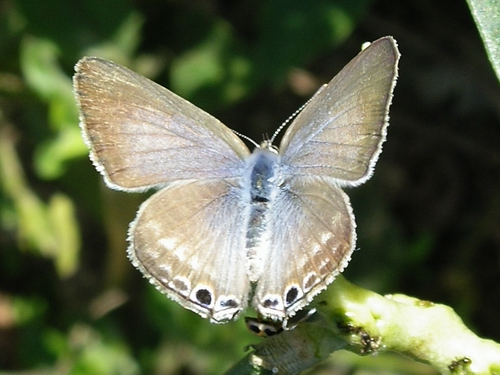
- Female peablue or long-tailed blue (Lampides boeticus)

Scientific classification
- Kingdom: Animalia
- Phylum: Arthropoda
- Clade: Pancrustacea
- Class: Insecta
- Order: Lepidoptera
- Family: Lycaenidae
- Subfamily: Polyommatinae
- Tribe: Polyommatini
- Genus: Lampides; Hübner, [1819]

Synonyms
- Cosmolyce Toxopeus, 1927; Lampidella Hemming, 1933

= Lampides =

Monotypic butterfly genus in family Lycaenidae

Lampides is a genus of butterflies in the family Lycaenidae.

It currently consists of one species: Lampides boeticus (Linnaeus, 1767), the peablue or long-tailed blue. Lampides used to contain other species, most of which have now been moved to the genus Jamides.
