= Sinocupido =

Scientific classification
- Domain: Eukaryota
- Kingdom: Animalia
- Phylum: Arthropoda
- Class: Insecta
- Order: Lepidoptera
- Family: Lycaenidae
- Subfamily: Polyommatinae
- Tribe: Polyommatini
- Genus: Sinocupido; Lee, 1963
- Species: S. lokiangensis

Binomial name
- Sinocupido lokiangensis Lee, 1963

Monotypic butterfly genus in family Lycaenidae

Sinocupido is a genus of butterflies in the family Lycaenidae. The genus is monotypic, containing the single species Sinocupido lokiangensis. The genus and the species were described from China (Xinjiang) in 1963. Very little is known about them.
