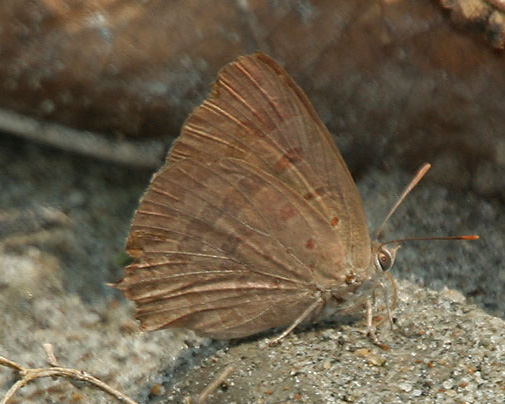

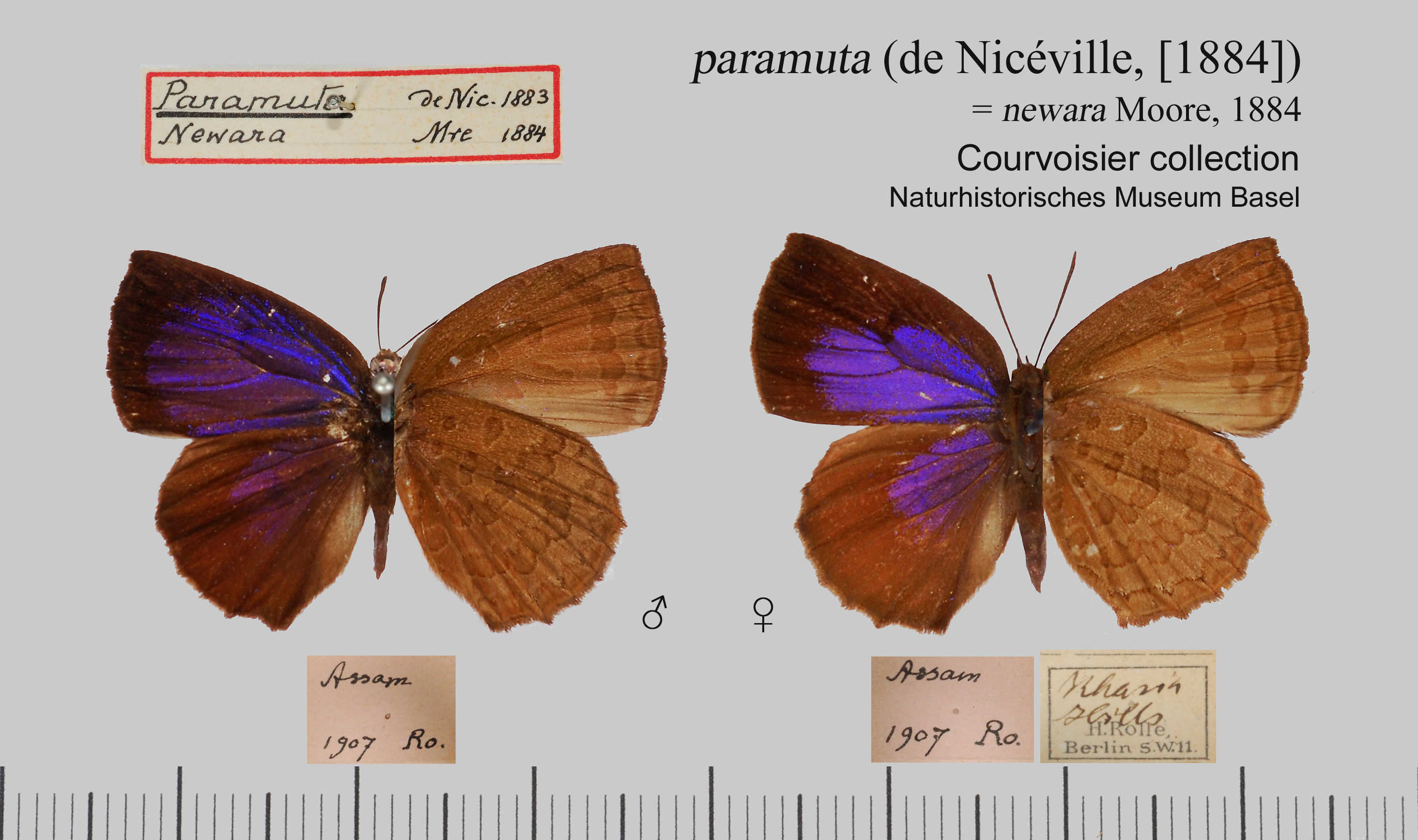
- Arhopala paramuta Courvoisier Collection, Basel

Scientific classification
- Kingdom: Animalia
- Phylum: Arthropoda
- Clade: Pancrustacea
- Class: Insecta
- Order: Lepidoptera
- Family: Lycaenidae
- Genus: Arhopala
- Species: A. paramuta

Binomial name
- Arhopala paramuta (de Nicéville, [1884])

Synonyms
- Amblypodia paramuta; Panchala paramuta de Nicéville, [1884]; Narathura amantes; Darasana newara Moore, 1884

= Arhopala paramuta =

Hooked oakblue

Species of butterfly

Arhopala paramuta, the hooked oakblue, is a butterfly of the family Lycaenidae. It is found in South-East Asia (see subspecies section).

== Description ==
Still much smaller than japonica (only about 35 mm), but easily discernible by the more dark blue colouring above which is very much reduced in the forewing by the very broad black distal margin, whilst in the hindwing it only covers yet the centre of the wing. Beneath the hindwing exhibits 4 distinct parallel macular bands. The imagines fly in Nepal, Assam, and Sikkim in the mountains, in the latter country they are not rare.

== Subspecies ==
- Arhopala paramuta paramuta (Assam, Sikkim, Burma, northern Thailand, southern China)
- Arhopala paramuta horishana (Taiwan)
