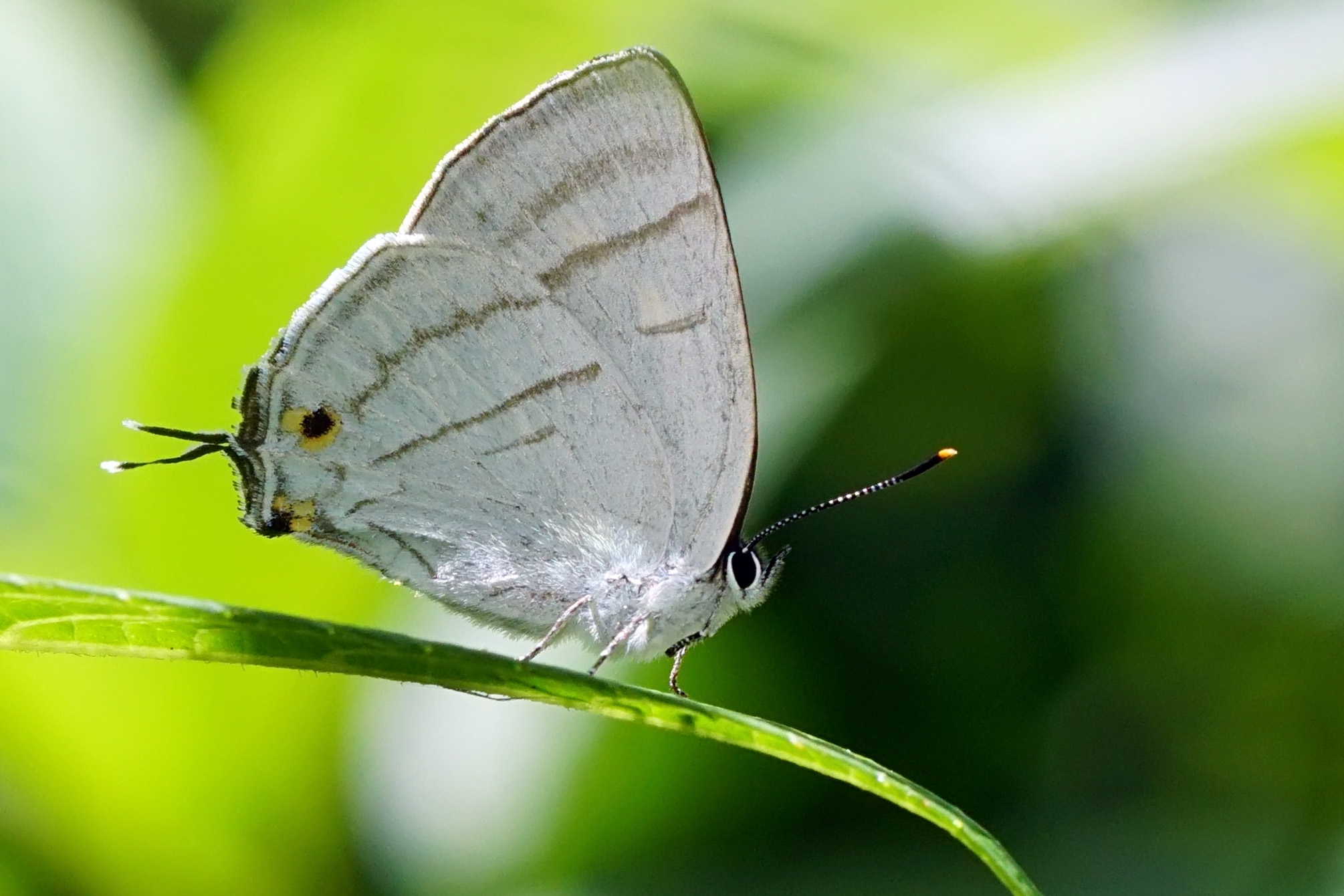
- Teratozephyrus arisanus

Scientific classification
- Domain: Eukaryota
- Kingdom: Animalia
- Phylum: Arthropoda
- Class: Insecta
- Order: Lepidoptera
- Family: Lycaenidae
- Tribe: Theclini
- Genus: Teratozephyrus; Sibatani, 1946

= Teratozephyrus =

Butterfly genus in family Lycaenidae

Teratozephyrus is a genus of butterflies in the family Lycaenidae.(Theclini) It is an East Palearctic (China, Taiwan, North Indochina) species associated with Quercus.

== Species ==
- Teratozephyrus arisanus (Wileman, 1909) Taiwan, Yunnan.Includes T. a. picquenardi (Oberthür, 1914) and T. a. kachinus Koiwaya, 2000 Myanmar
- Teratozephyrus zhejiangensis Chou & Tong, 1994 Zhejiang
- Teratozephyrus hecale (Leech, 1894) Tibet, West China.
- Teratozephyrus chibahieyukii Fujioka, 1994 China, Szechwan, Kuan-Hsien, north west of Cheng-tu.
- Teratozephyrus florianii Bozano, 1996 = Hayashikeia florianii Bozano, 1996 China, W. Sichuan, Kangding.
- Teratozephyrus hinomaru Fujioka, 1994 China, Szechwan, Nanchuan, Chin-fo-shan, 1600–1800 m.
- Teratozephyrus kimurai Koiwaya, 2002 Vietnam
- Teratozephyrus muroyai Fujioka, 2003 = Teratozephyrus kimurai
- Teratozephyrus nuwai Koiwaya, 1996 China Gansu, Tianshui (1700m).
- Teratozephyrus tsukiyamahiroshii Fujioka, 1994 Vietnam
