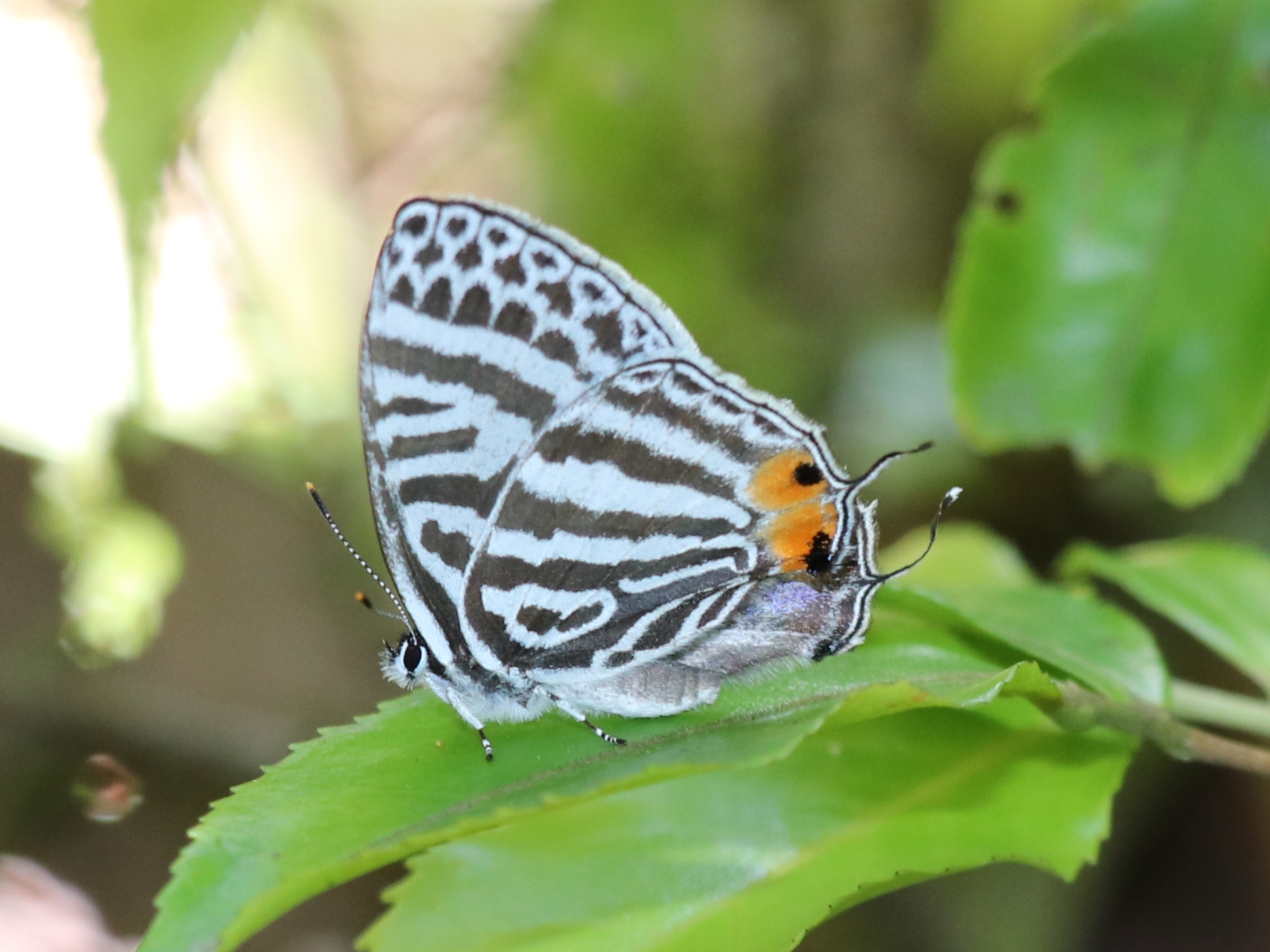

Scientific classification
- Kingdom: Animalia
- Phylum: Arthropoda
- Clade: Pancrustacea
- Class: Insecta
- Order: Lepidoptera
- Family: Lycaenidae
- Tribe: Theclini
- Genus: Yamamotozephyrus; Saigusa, 1983
- Species: Y. kwangtungensis

Binomial name
- Yamamotozephyrus kwangtungensis (Forster, 1942)

= Yamamotozephyrus =

Monotypic butterfly genus in family Lycaenidae

Yamamotozephyrus is a butterfly genus in the family Lycaenidae. It is monotypic, containing only the species Yamamotozephyrus kwangtungensis. There are three subspecies

- Yamamotozephyrus kwangtungensis (Forster, 1942) China (Kwangtung)
- Y. k. hainana (Koiwaya, 1993) Hainan
- Y. k. mayhkaensis Watanabe, 2000 Myanmar
