= Saigusaozephyrus =

Scientific classification
- Kingdom: Animalia
- Phylum: Arthropoda
- Class: Insecta
- Order: Lepidoptera
- Family: Lycaenidae
- Tribe: Theclini
- Genus: Saigusaozephyrus; Koiwaya, 1993
- Species: S. atabyrius

Binomial name
- Saigusaozephyrus atabyrius (Oberthür, 1914)

Monotypic butterfly genus in family Lycaenidae

Saigusaozephyrus is a butterfly genus in the family Lycaenidae. It is monotypic, containing only the species Saigusaozephyrus atabyrius..S. atabyrius is endemic to West China.
