= Subsolanoides =

Scientific classification
- Domain: Eukaryota
- Kingdom: Animalia
- Phylum: Arthropoda
- Class: Insecta
- Order: Lepidoptera
- Family: Lycaenidae
- Subfamily: Polyommatinae
- Tribe: Polyommatini
- Genus: Subsolanoides; Koiwaya, 1989
- Species: S. nagata

Binomial name
- Subsolanoides nagata Koiwaya, 1989

Monotypic butterfly genus in family Lycaenidae

Subsolanoides is a genus of butterflies in the family Lycaenidae. It is a monotypic genus, containing the single species Subsolanoides nagata, which is endemic to China.
