= Takashi Shirozu =

Japanese lepidopterist

Takashi Shirozu (白水 隆, Shirōzu Takashi; 14 September 1917 in Fukuoka – 2 April 2004) was a Japanese entomologist who specialised in Lepidoptera.

He wrote Butterflies of Formosa in Colour Osaka, Hoikusha (1960), Early Stages of Japanese Butterflies in Colour Hoikusha (with Akira Hara, 1960) and Butterflies of Japan Illustrated in Colour Tokyo, Hokuryu-kan (1964) all of which took advantage of Japanese advanced (optical) and colour printing technologies. He also published many scientific papers describing new species of butterflies.

Dr. Takashi Shirozu was a professor emeritus of Kyushu University and president emeritus of The Lepidopterological Society of Japan.
