= List of lycaenid genera: E =

The large butterfly family Lycaenidae contains the following genera starting with the letter E:

- Echinargus
- Eicochrysops
- Eldoradina
- Electrostrymon
- Eliotiana
- Elkalyce
- Enos
- Eooxylides
- Epamera
- Epimastidia
- Epitola
- Epitolina
- Eresina
- Eresinopsides
- Eresiomera
- Erikssonia
- Erina
- Erora
- Erysichton
- Esakiozephyrus
- Etesiolaus
- Euaspa
- Euchrysops
- Euliphyra
- Eumaeus
- Eumedonia
- Eumenia
- Euphilotes
- Euristrymon
- Euthecta
- Evenus
- Exorbaetta
