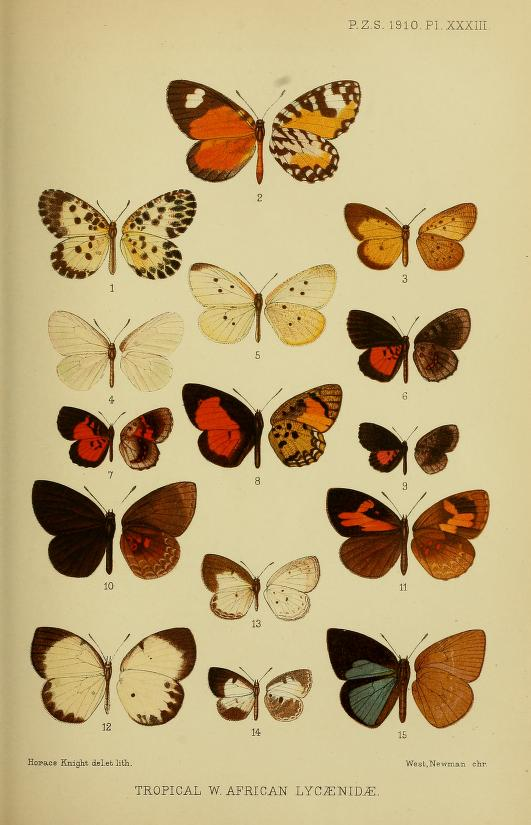
- Pseuderesia osheba figures 6 and 7

Scientific classification
- Domain: Eukaryota
- Kingdom: Animalia
- Phylum: Arthropoda
- Class: Insecta
- Order: Lepidoptera
- Family: Lycaenidae
- Subfamily: Poritiinae
- Genus: Pseuderesia; Butler, 1874

= Pseuderesia =

Butterfly genus in family Lycaenidae

Pseuderesia is a genus of butterflies in the family Lycaenidae. The species of this genus are endemic to the Afrotropics. The genus Eresiomera is sometimes treated as a synonym of Pseuderesia.

== Species ==
- Pseuderesia eleaza (Hewitson, 1873)
- Pseuderesia mapongua (Holland, 1893)
- Pseuderesia vidua Talbot, 1937
