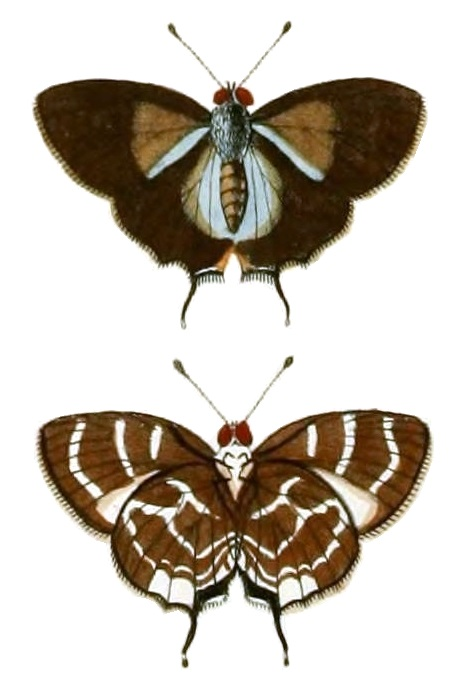
- Imago of type species T. lausus

Scientific classification
- Kingdom: Animalia
- Phylum: Arthropoda
- Clade: Pancrustacea
- Class: Insecta
- Order: Lepidoptera
- Family: Lycaenidae
- Tribe: Eumaeini
- Genus: Thereus; Hübner, [1819]

Type species
- Papilio lausus Cramer, [1779]

Diversity
- Some 20 described species, but see text

Synonyms
- List: Molus Hübner, [1819]; Noreena K.Johnson, MacPherson & Ingraham, 1986; Pedusa D'Abrera, 2001; Solanorum Johnson, 1992; Timokla Johnson, Kruse & Kroenlein, 1997

= Thereus =

Butterfly genus in family Lycaenidae

Thereus is a genus of gossamer-winged butterflies (family Lycaenidae). Among these, it belongs to the tribe Eumaeini of the subfamily Theclinae. These small butterflies occur essentially all over the Neotropics.

== Taxonomy ==
Though this genus was first proposed long ago, for much of the time Thereus was included in the "wastebin genus" Thecla. However, the two genera are not particularly close relatives among their subfamily. In recent times, it has been proposed to remove several species from Thereus to smaller or even monotypic genera. While this might be warranted in some cases, it is not followed here pending more thorough study.

=== Species ===
The following named species are placed in Thereus at present:

- Thereus brocki Robbins, Heredia & Busby, 2015
- Thereus caltha (Druce, 1907)
- Thereus cithonius (Godart, [1824]) (type species of Noreena)
- Thereus columbicola (Strand, 1916)
- Thereus endera (Hewitson, 1867)
- Thereus enenia (Hewitson, 1867) (tentatively placed here)
- Thereus eryssus (Herbst, 1800)
- Thereus gabathana (Strand, 1918)
- Thereus genena (Hewitson, 1867)
- Thereus guianivaga (Johnson, 1989)
- Thereus illex (Schaus, 1902)
- Thereus ismarus (Cramer, [1777]) (type species of Molus)
- Thereus lausus (Cramer, [1779])
- Thereus lomalarga Robbins, Heredia & Busby, 2015
- Thereus lutzi (Huntington, 1932)
- Thereus molena (E. D. Jones, 1912)
- Thereus oppia (Godman & Salvin, [1887])
- Thereus orasus (Godman & Salvin, [1887])
- Thereus ortalus (Godman & Salvin, [1887])
- Thereus pedusa (Hewitson, 1867) (type species of "Pedusa")
- Thereus praxis (Godman & Salvin, [1887])
- Thereus pseudarcula (Giacomelli, 1914) (type species of Solanorum)
- Thereus tiasa (Hewitson, 1869)
- Thereus timoclea (Hewitson, 1870)
- Thereus wojtusiaki Bálint, 2006

In addition, a number of as yet undescribed butterflies are suspected to belong here too:

- Thereus sp. 'Amazonia'
- Thereus sp. 'Bahia'
- Thereus sp. 'Guatemala'
- Thereus sp. 'Ecuador 1'
- Thereus sp. 'Ecuador 2'
- Thereus sp. 'Panama 1'
- Thereus sp. 'Panama 2'
- ?Thereus sp. 'Panama 3' (tentatively placed here)
- Thereus sp. 'Peru'
