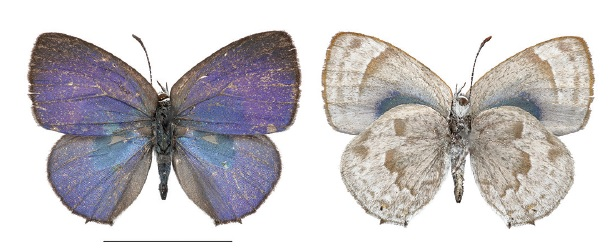
- Male
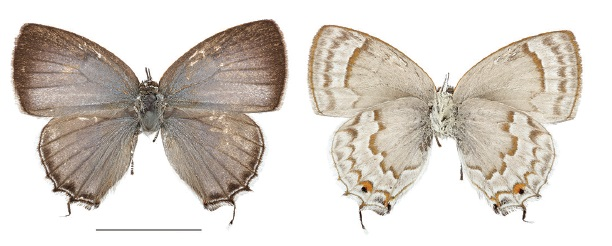
- Female

Scientific classification
- Domain: Eukaryota
- Kingdom: Animalia
- Phylum: Arthropoda
- Class: Insecta
- Order: Lepidoptera
- Family: Lycaenidae
- Genus: Thereus
- Species: T. orasus

Binomial name
- Thereus orasus (Godman & Salvin, [1887])

Synonyms
- Thecla orasus Godman & Salvin, [1887]; Thecla echinita Schaus, 1902

= Thereus orasus =

Species of butterfly

Thereus orasus is a species of butterfly of the family Lycaenidae. It occurs in montane habitats from central Mexico (Colima and Veracruz) to those of western Panama (Chiriquí) at elevations from 1,100 to 1,800 meters.

The larvae feed on Struthanthus condensatus.
