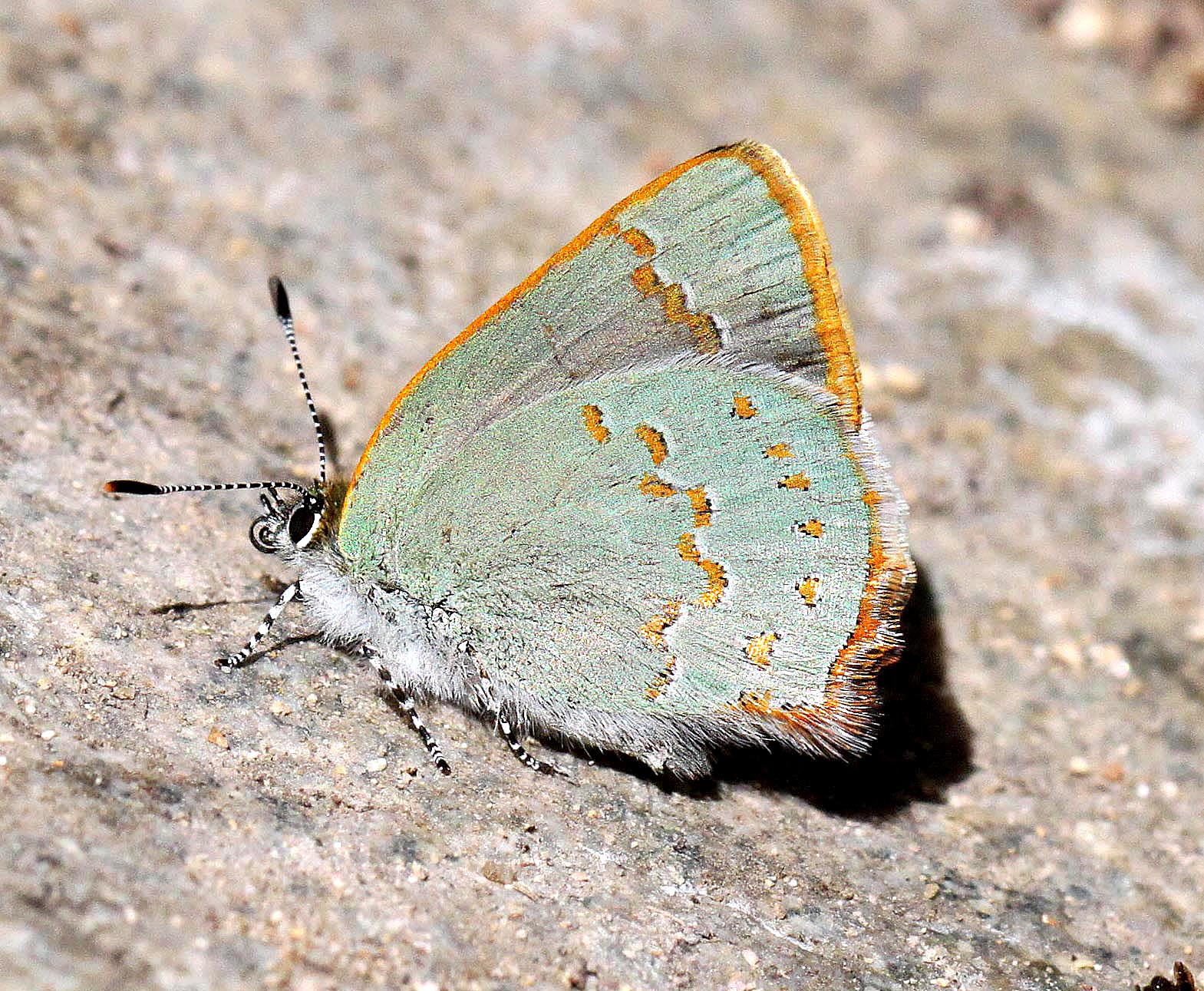

Scientific classification
- Kingdom: Animalia
- Phylum: Arthropoda
- Clade: Pancrustacea
- Class: Insecta
- Order: Lepidoptera
- Family: Lycaenidae
- Tribe: Eumaeini
- Genus: Erora
- Species: E. quaderna

Binomial name
- Erora quaderna (Hewitson, 1868)

= Erora quaderna =

Species of butterfly

Erora quaderna, the Arizona hairstreak, is a species of hairstreak in the butterfly family Lycaenidae. It is found in North America.

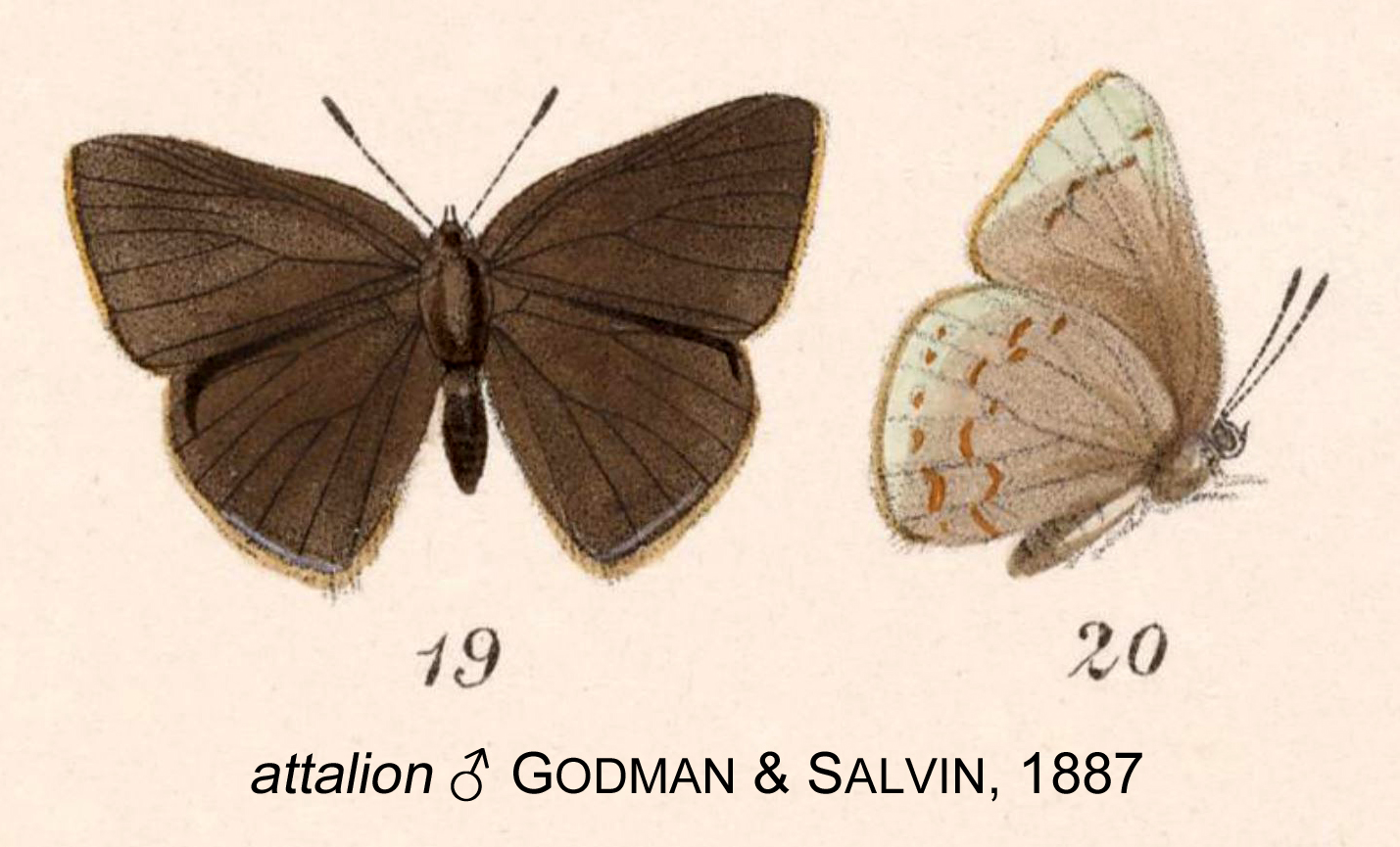
Arizona hairstreak, Erora quaderna

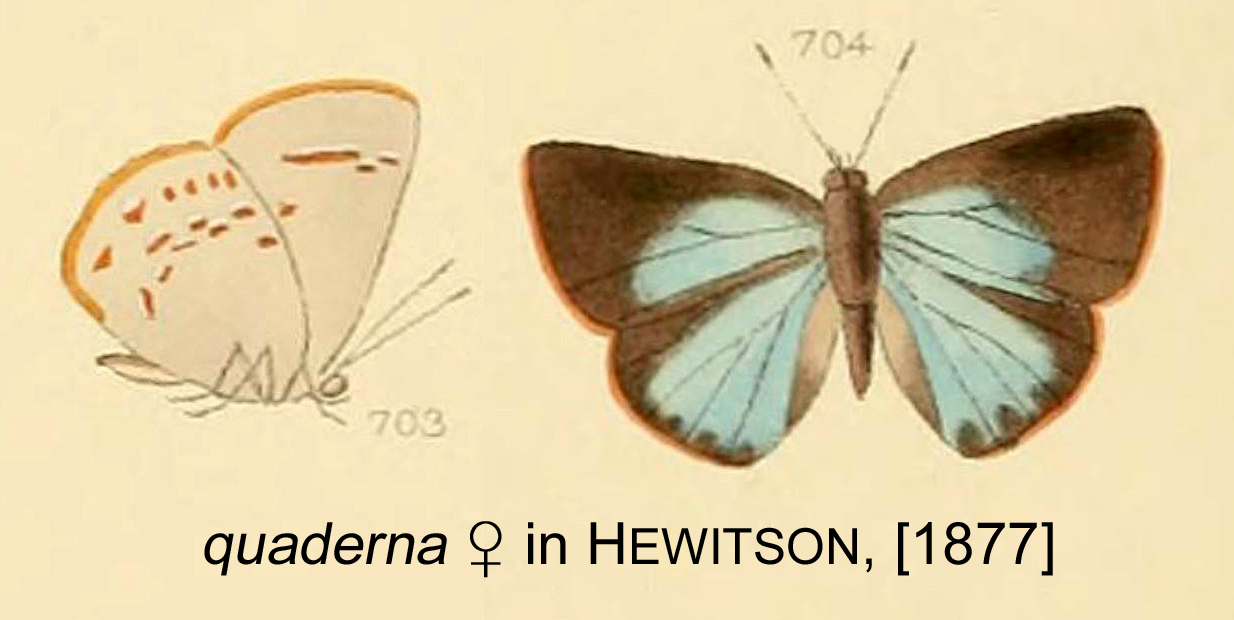
Arizona hairstreak, Erora quaderna

== Subspecies ==
These two subspecies belong to the species Erora quaderna:

- Erora quaderna quaderna
- Erora quaderna sanfordi dos Passos, 1940
