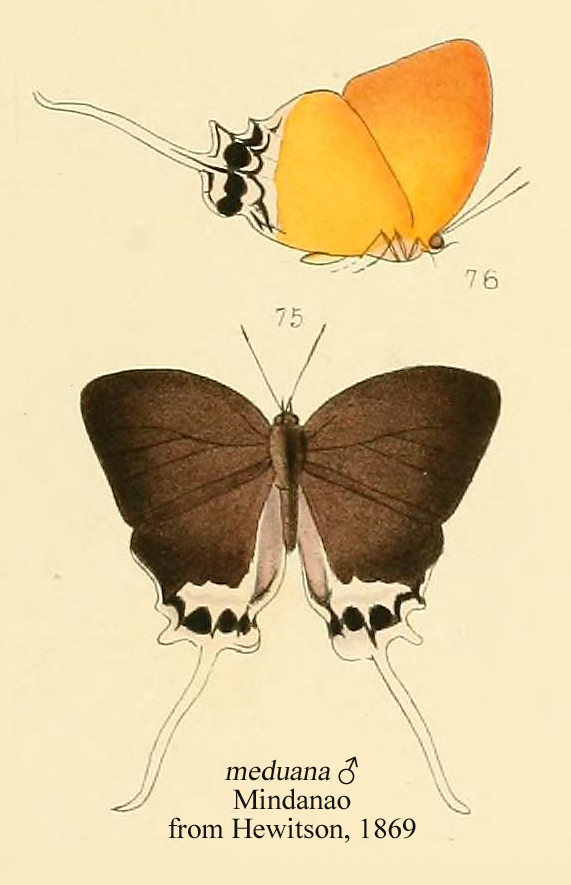

Scientific classification
- Domain: Eukaryota
- Kingdom: Animalia
- Phylum: Arthropoda
- Class: Insecta
- Order: Lepidoptera
- Family: Lycaenidae
- Genus: Eooxylides
- Species: E. meduana

Binomial name
- Eooxylides meduana (Hewitson, 1869)

Synonyms
- Myrina meduana Hewitson, 1869

= Eooxylides meduana =

Species of butterfly

Eooxylides meduana is a butterfly in the family Lycaenidae. It was described by William Chapman Hewitson in 1869. It is found in the Philippines (Mindanao, Bohol, Panaon).
