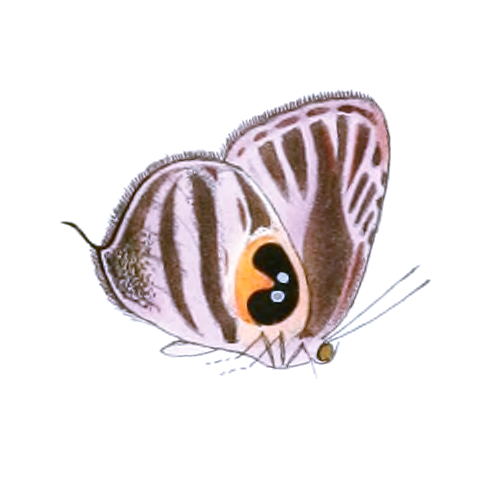
- The disputed Enos mazurka Underwing pattern of female imago, from the original description by W.C. Hewitson

Scientific classification
- Kingdom: Animalia
- Phylum: Arthropoda
- Clade: Pancrustacea
- Class: Insecta
- Order: Lepidoptera
- Family: Lycaenidae
- Tribe: Eumaeini
- Genus: Enos; Johnson, Kruse & Kroenlein, 1997

Diversity
- 5 species, but see text

Synonyms
- Chopinia D'Abrera, 2001 (may be nomen nudum); Falerinota K.Johnson, Austin, Le Crom & Salazar, 1997

= Enos (butterfly) =

Butterfly genus in family Lycaenidae

Enos is a genus of gossamer-winged butterflies (family Lycaenidae). Among these, it belongs to the tribe Eumaeini of the subfamily Theclinae. These small butterflies occur essentially all over the Neotropics.

This genus has a somewhat convoluted nomenclatorial and taxonomic history. It was established only fairly recently, but most of its members were in fact already known to the 19th century researcher William Chapman Hewitson. Hewitson did not yet recognize their distinctness though, and included them in his "wastebin genus" Thecla. However, the two genera are not particularly close relatives among their subfamily.

== Classification ==
The genus was established within months by different team of authors; as usual in such cases, the junior synonym Falerinota was abolished in favor of the older name Enos. Its known species are, as of 2011:

- Enos falerina (Hewitson, 1867)
- Enos mazurka (Hewitson, 1867) (tentatively placed here)
- Enos myrtea (Hewitson, 1867)
- Enos polka Lamas & Robbins, 2009 (formerly E. maculata)
- Enos thara (Hewitson, 1867)

It is not fully resolved whether this represents a good monophyletic circumscription. E. mazurka and perhaps some others might warrant separation in a distinct genus. The name "Chopinia" was proposed for this, but it was subsequently argued to be a nomen nudum per Article 13.1 of the ICZN Code, because an appropriate genus description was not given. The matter has been submitted to the ICZN for discussion; regardless the questions of nomenclature, E. mazurka is for the time being retained here.
