= Eresiomera magnimacula =

Scientific classification
- Domain: Eukaryota
- Kingdom: Animalia
- Phylum: Arthropoda
- Class: Insecta
- Order: Lepidoptera
- Family: Lycaenidae
- Genus: Eresiomera
- Species: E. magnimacula

Binomial name
- Eresiomera magnimacula (Rebel, 1914)

Synonyms
- Pseuderesia magnimacula Rebel, 1914; Eresiomera isca magnimacula; Pseuderesia beni Stempffer, 1961

Species of butterfly

Eresiomera magnimacula is a butterfly in the family Lycaenidae. It is found in Cameroon, the Republic of the Congo, the Democratic Republic of the Congo (Lualaba, Ituri, North Kivu and Uele) and Uganda (the Budongo Forest). The habitat consists of forests.
