= Eresiomera clenchi =

Scientific classification
- Domain: Eukaryota
- Kingdom: Animalia
- Phylum: Arthropoda
- Class: Insecta
- Order: Lepidoptera
- Family: Lycaenidae
- Genus: Eresiomera
- Species: E. clenchi

Binomial name
- Eresiomera clenchi (Stempffer, 1961)

Synonyms
- Pseuderesia clenchi Stempffer, 1961

Species of butterfly

Eresiomera clenchi is a butterfly in the family Lycaenidae. It is found in Cameroon, the Republic of the Congo and Gabon.
