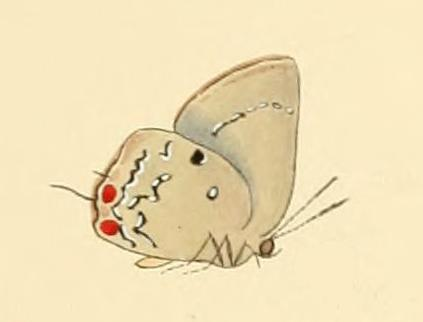

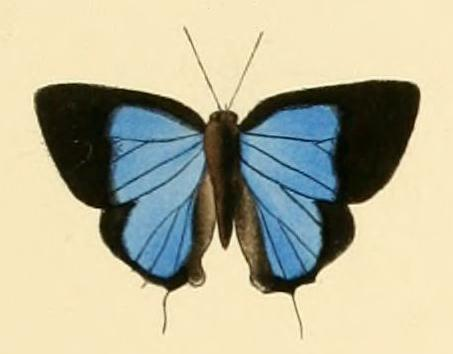

Scientific classification
- Kingdom: Animalia
- Phylum: Arthropoda
- Clade: Pancrustacea
- Class: Insecta
- Order: Lepidoptera
- Family: Lycaenidae
- Genus: Enos
- Species: E. falerina

Binomial name
- Enos falerina (Hewitson, 1867)

Synonyms
- Thecla falerina Hewitson, 1867; Falerinota falerina

= Enos falerina =

Species of butterfly

Enos falerina is a butterfly in the family Lycaenidae. It is found in the Guianas, the Amazon region, Colombia, Peru and Guatemala.

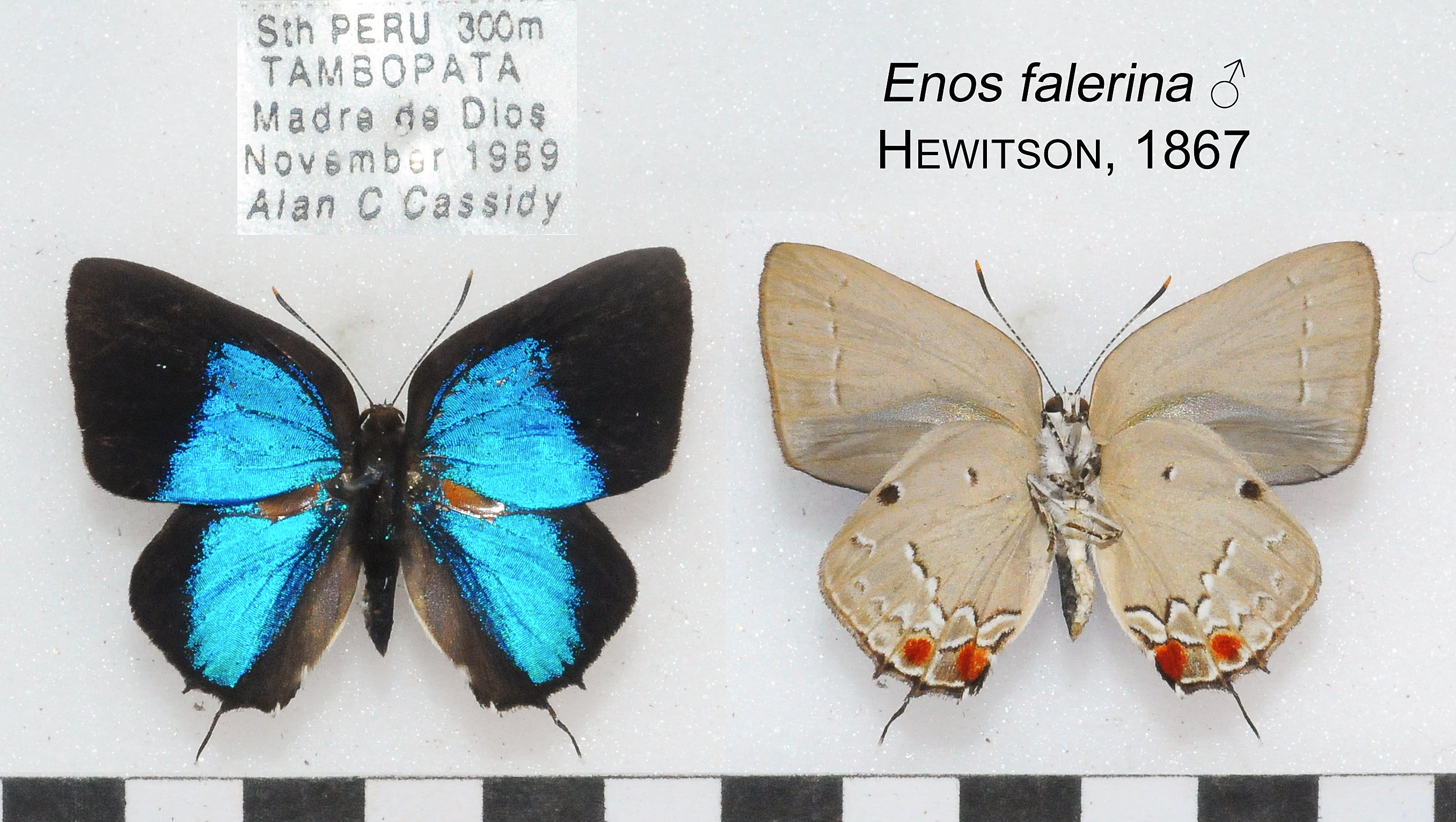
