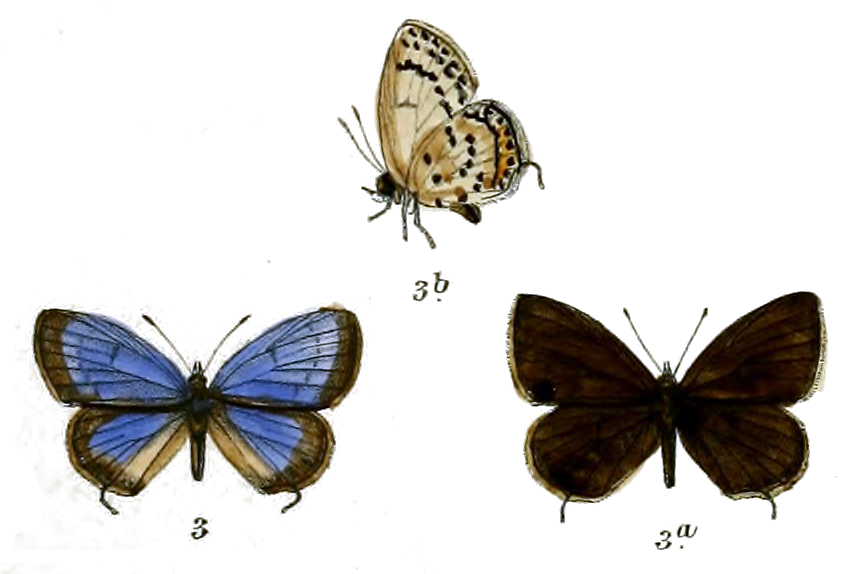

Scientific classification
- Domain: Eukaryota
- Kingdom: Animalia
- Phylum: Arthropoda
- Class: Insecta
- Order: Lepidoptera
- Family: Lycaenidae
- Genus: Elkalyce
- Species: E. diporides

Binomial name
- Elkalyce diporides (Chapman 1909)

= Elkalyce diporides =

Species of butterfly

Elkalyce diporides, the Chapman's cupid, is a small butterfly found in India that belongs to the lycaenids or blues family.
