= Elkalyce kala =

Black Cupid

Scientific classification
- Domain: Eukaryota
- Kingdom: Animalia
- Phylum: Arthropoda
- Class: Insecta
- Order: Lepidoptera
- Family: Lycaenidae
- Genus: Elkalyce
- Species: E. kala

Binomial name
- Elkalyce kala (de Nicéville 1890)

Species of butterfly

Elkalyce kala, the black Cupid, is a small butterfly found in India that belongs to the lycaenids or blues family.

== Description ==
Upperside fuscous black. Forewings and hindwings: jet-black anteciliary slender lines and on the hindwing, traces of a subterminal line of black spots. Cilia, forewing: dusky brown; hindwing: white alternated with brown at the apices of the veins. Underside: white with a greyish tint on the forewing except on the posterior terminal third and on the hindwing on the basal area anteriorly. Forewing: a slender, short, black transverse line on the discocellulars, a transverse discal row of six prominent black spots as follows: posterior three elongate, placed obliquely and en echelon, the next spot above also elongate and posited almost horizontally, the anterior two round and curved inwards; a transverse inner subterminal series of black lunules, an outer similar series of minute black dots and an anteciliary slender black line; cilia white alternated with brown at the apices of the veins. Hindwing: a transverse subbasal series of three black spots, the posterior spot minute, a transverse black spot on the middle of the dorsal margin, a transverse slender black lunule on the discocellulars, and a prominent, transverse, somewhat irregularly curved discal row of black spots posited as follows: posterior two slightly elongate and placed en echelon of the three spots next above, the middle spot is elongate and placed longitudinally, the other two are round, the anterior two spots are round, shifted a little inwards out of line, the one nearest the costa very large and conspicuous; terminal markings and cilia as on the forewing. Antennae black, the shafts speckled with white; head, thorax and abdomen fuscous black; beneath: palpi, head, thorax and abdomen white.

== See also ==
- List of butterflies of India
- List of butterflies of India (Lycaenidae)
