= Eresiomera phaeochiton =

Scientific classification
- Domain: Eukaryota
- Kingdom: Animalia
- Phylum: Arthropoda
- Class: Insecta
- Order: Lepidoptera
- Family: Lycaenidae
- Genus: Eresiomera
- Species: E. phaeochiton

Binomial name
- Eresiomera phaeochiton (Grünberg, 1910)

Synonyms
- Pseuderesia phaeochiton Grünberg, 1910

Species of butterfly

Eresiomera phaeochiton is a butterfly in the family Lycaenidae. It is found in Equatorial Guinea, and possibly the Democratic Republic of the Congo (Maniema) and the Republic of the Congo.
