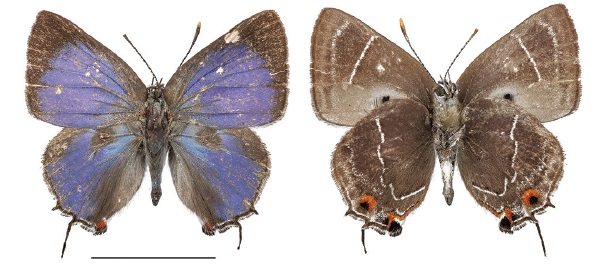
- Male
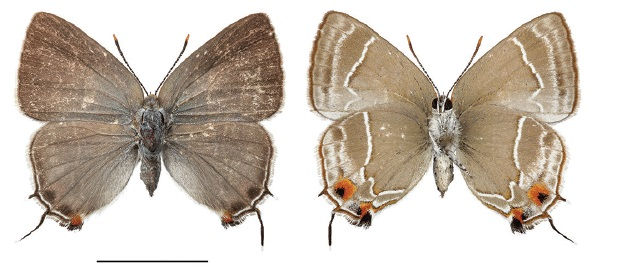
- Female

Scientific classification
- Domain: Eukaryota
- Kingdom: Animalia
- Phylum: Arthropoda
- Class: Insecta
- Order: Lepidoptera
- Family: Lycaenidae
- Genus: Thereus
- Species: T. oppia

Binomial name
- Thereus oppia (Godman & Salvin, [1887])

Synonyms
- Thecla oppia Godman & Salvin, [1887]

= Thereus oppia =

Species of butterfly

Thereus oppia is a species of butterfly of the family Lycaenidae. It is found from Mexico to Costa Rica at a variety of elevations. Most localities where it occurs appear to be deciduous dry forest.

The larvae feed on Struthanthus orbicularis.
