= Eresiomera paradoxa =

Scientific classification
- Domain: Eukaryota
- Kingdom: Animalia
- Phylum: Arthropoda
- Class: Insecta
- Order: Lepidoptera
- Family: Lycaenidae
- Genus: Eresiomera
- Species: E. paradoxa

Binomial name
- Eresiomera paradoxa (Schultze, 1917)

Synonyms
- Pseuderesia paradoxa Schultze, 1917; Pseuderesia paradoxa orientalis Stempffer, 1962

Species of butterfly

Eresiomera paradoxa is a butterfly in the family Lycaenidae. It is found in Cameroon, the Republic of the Congo and Uganda.

== Subspecies ==
- Eresiomera paradoxa paradoxa (Cameroon, Congo)
- Eresiomera paradoxa orientalis (Stempffer, 1962) (Uganda: Kalinzu Forest)
