= Euaspa motokii =

Scientific classification
- Kingdom: Animalia
- Phylum: Arthropoda
- Clade: Pancrustacea
- Class: Insecta
- Order: Lepidoptera
- Family: Lycaenidae
- Genus: Euaspa
- Species: E. motokii

Binomial name
- Euaspa motokii Koiwaya, 2002

Species of butterfly

Euaspa motokii, also known as the Kachin hairstreak, is a butterfly in the family Hesperiidae. It is found in Arunachal Pradesh in India and Myanmar. It was described by Satoshi Koiwaya in 2002. This species is monotypic.

== Description ==
This species can be separated from its congeners from the following characteristics:

- The subterminal area of underside forewing in space 1b to 2 having a less prominent black mark. Euaspa forsteri has a prominent black mark.
- The presence of two sub-basal white markings on the underside hindwing.
- The presence of one oval shape in the cell and a semi-circular shape in space 7.

The larvae of this species are known to feed on Castanopsis.
