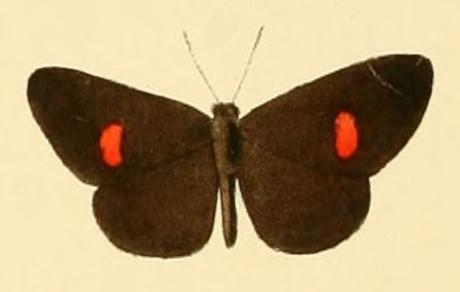

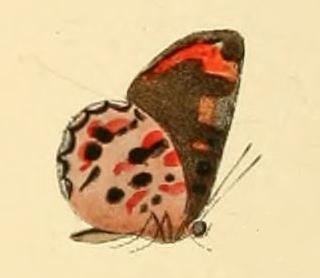

Scientific classification
- Domain: Eukaryota
- Kingdom: Animalia
- Phylum: Arthropoda
- Class: Insecta
- Order: Lepidoptera
- Family: Lycaenidae
- Genus: Pseuderesia
- Species: P. eleaza

Binomial name
- Pseuderesia eleaza (Hewitson, 1873)

Synonyms
- Pentila eleaza Hewitson, 1873; Pseuderesia catharina Butler, 1874; Pseuderesia variegata Grose-Smith and Kirby, 1890; Pseuderesia picta Grose-Smith, 1898; Pseuderesia nigra Cator, 1904

= Pseuderesia eleaza =

Species of butterfly

Pseuderesia eleaza, the variable harlequin, is a butterfly in the family Lycaenidae. It is found in Guinea-Bissau, Sierra Leone, Liberia, Ivory Coast, Ghana, Benin, Nigeria, Cameroon, Equatorial Guinea, the Republic of the Congo, the Democratic Republic of the Congo, Uganda and Tanzania. Its habitat consists of forests.

== Subspecies ==
- Pseuderesia eleaza eleaza (Guinea-Bissau, Sierra Leone, Liberia, Ivory Coast, Ghana, Benin, southern Nigeria, Cameroon, Equatorial Guinea, Congo, Democratic Republic of the Congo: Uele, Tshopo, Equateur and Sankuru)
- Pseuderesia eleaza katera Stempffer, 1961 (Uganda, Democratic Republic of the Congo: Uele and Kivu, north-western Tanzania)
