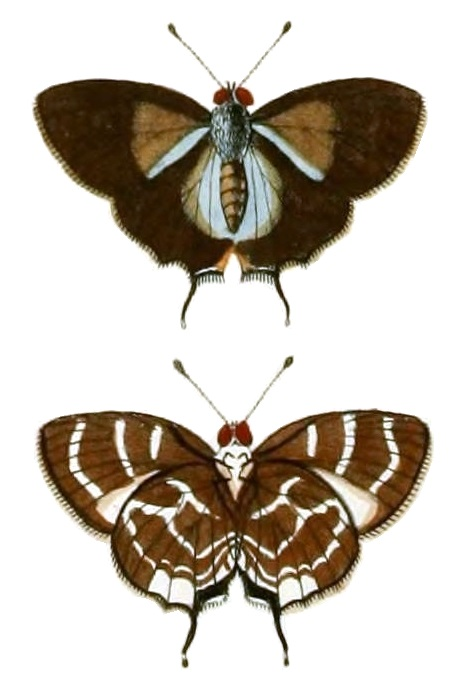

Scientific classification
- Domain: Eukaryota
- Kingdom: Animalia
- Phylum: Arthropoda
- Class: Insecta
- Order: Lepidoptera
- Family: Lycaenidae
- Genus: Thereus
- Species: T. lausus

Binomial name
- Thereus lausus (Cramer, [1779])

Synonyms
- Papilio lausus Cramer, [1779]; Papilio libanius Stoll, [1782]

= Thereus lausus =

Species of butterfly

Thereus pedusa is a species of butterfly of the family Lycaenidae. It is found from Nicaragua to Brazil (Amazon region) and Suriname.
