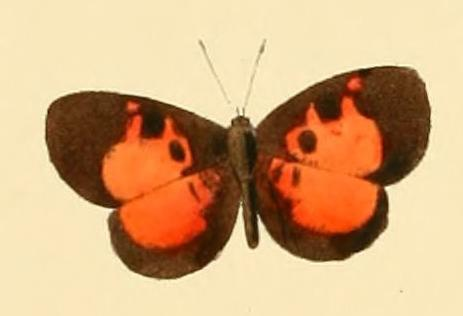

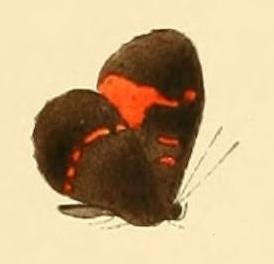

Scientific classification
- Kingdom: Animalia
- Phylum: Arthropoda
- Class: Insecta
- Order: Lepidoptera
- Family: Lycaenidae
- Genus: Eresiomera
- Species: E. isca

Binomial name
- Eresiomera isca (Hewitson, 1873)

Synonyms
- Liptena isca Hewitson, 1873; Pseuderesia isca; Pseuderesia isca ab. demaculata Hulstaert, 1924

= Eresiomera isca =

Species of butterfly

Eresiomera isca, the common pearly, is a butterfly in the family Lycaenidae. It is found in Guinea, Sierra Leone, Liberia, Ivory Coast, Ghana, Nigeria, Cameroon, Bioko, Gabon, the Republic of the Congo, the Central African Republic and the Democratic Republic of the Congo. The habitat consists of forests and swamp forests.

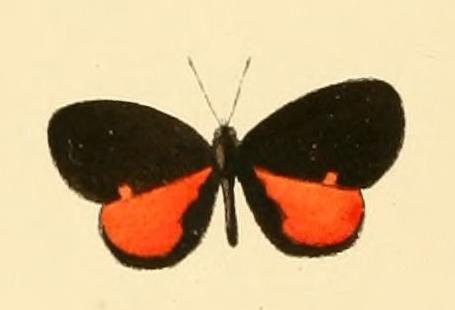

== Subspecies ==
- Eresiomera isca isca (Nigeria: east of the Niger river, Cameroon, Equatorial Guinea: Bioko, Gabon, Congo, Central African Republic, Democratic Republic of the Congo: Kinshasa, Equateur, Tshuapa, Mongala and Uele)
- Eresiomera isca occidentalis Collins & Larsen, 1998 (Guinea, Sierra Leone, Liberia, Ivory Coast, Ghana, Nigeria: west of the Niger river)
