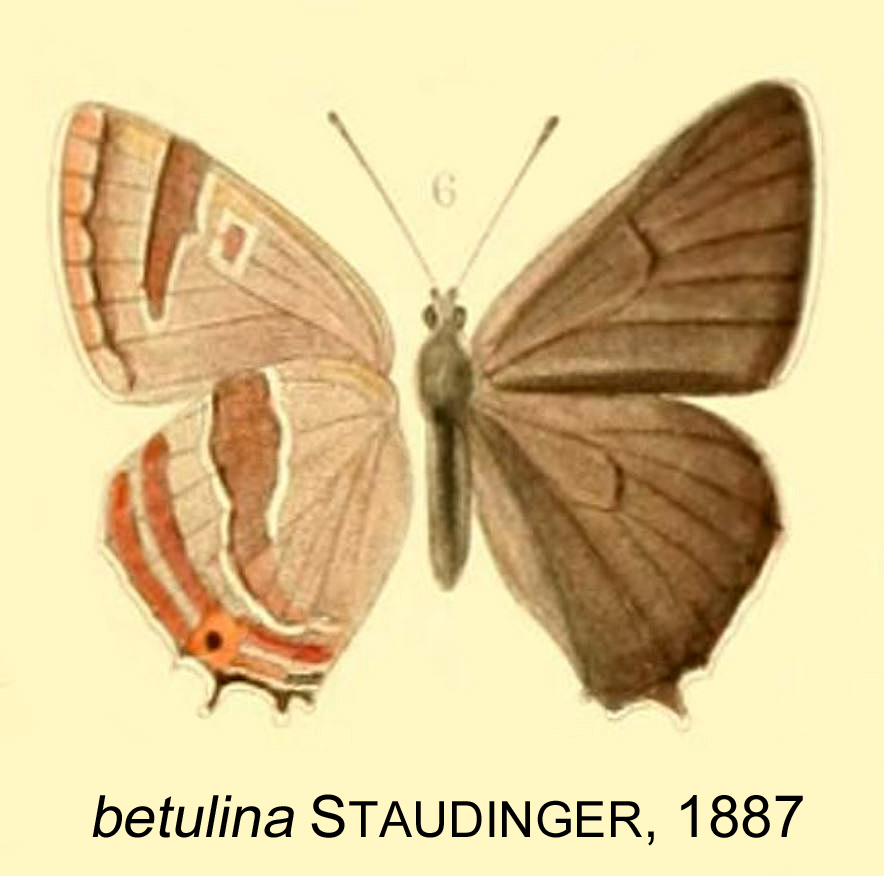

Scientific classification
- Domain: Eukaryota
- Kingdom: Animalia
- Phylum: Arthropoda
- Class: Insecta
- Order: Lepidoptera
- Family: Lycaenidae
- Genus: Thecla
- Species: T. betulina

Binomial name
- Thecla betulina Staudinger, 1887

Synonyms
- Zephyrus betulae gaimana Doi & Chow, 1931

= Thecla betulina =

Species of butterfly

Thecla betulina is a butterfly of the family Lycaenidae. It was described by Otto Staudinger in 1887. It is found in the Russian Far East (Ussuri, Amur), north-eastern China and Korea. The species is found in the forest belt where it inhabits forest edges and river valleys.

Adults often visit flowering Umbelliferae species.

The larvae feed on Malus species (including M. mandschurica) and possibly Pyrus species. They roll a leaf of their host plant, forming a tube.

== Subspecies ==
- Thecla betulina betulina
- Thecla betulina minekoae Morita, 2003 (China: Yunnan)
- Thecla betulina shibasakii Morita, 2003 (China: Heilongjiang)
