= Thecla letha =

Watson's hairstreak

Scientific classification
- Domain: Eukaryota
- Kingdom: Animalia
- Phylum: Arthropoda
- Class: Insecta
- Order: Lepidoptera
- Family: Lycaenidae
- Genus: Thecla
- Species: T. letha

Binomial name
- Thecla letha (Watson, 1896)

Species of butterfly

Thecla letha, the Watson's hairstreak, is a small butterfly found in India that belongs to the lycaenids or blues family.

== Range ==
The butterfly occurs in India in Assam and extends to the Chin Hills and southern Shan states in Myanmar.

== See also ==
- List of butterflies of India (Lycaenidae)
