= Pseuderesia mapongua =

Scientific classification
- Domain: Eukaryota
- Kingdom: Animalia
- Phylum: Arthropoda
- Class: Insecta
- Order: Lepidoptera
- Family: Lycaenidae
- Genus: Pseuderesia
- Species: P. mapongua

Binomial name
- Pseuderesia mapongua (Holland, 1893)

Synonyms
- Durbania mapongua Holland, 1893

Species of butterfly

Pseuderesia mapongua is a butterfly in the family Lycaenidae. It is found in Gabon.
