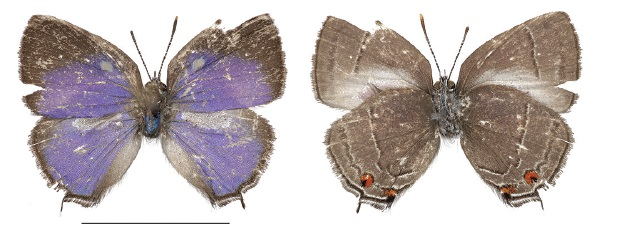
- Male
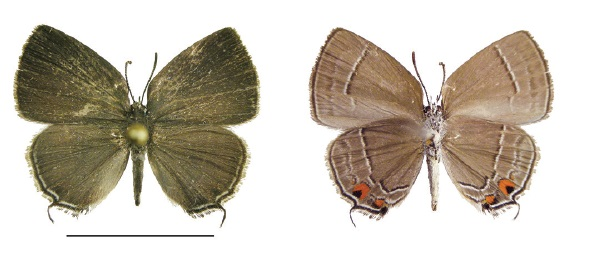
- Female

Scientific classification
- Domain: Eukaryota
- Kingdom: Animalia
- Phylum: Arthropoda
- Class: Insecta
- Order: Lepidoptera
- Family: Lycaenidae
- Genus: Thereus
- Species: T. brocki

Binomial name
- Thereus brocki Robbins, Heredia & Busby, 2015

= Thereus brocki =

Species of butterfly

Thereus brocki is a species of butterfly of the family Lycaenidae. It found from eastern Colombia to eastern Peru. The habitat consists of wet forests up to about 1,000 meters elevation.

== Etymology ==
The species is named for James Brock of Tucson, Arizona who collected the holotype.
