= Eresiomera phillipi =

Scientific classification
- Domain: Eukaryota
- Kingdom: Animalia
- Phylum: Arthropoda
- Class: Insecta
- Order: Lepidoptera
- Family: Lycaenidae
- Genus: Eresiomera
- Species: E. phillipi

Binomial name
- Eresiomera phillipi Collins & Larsen, 1998

Species of butterfly

Eresiomera phillipi is a butterfly in the family Lycaenidae. It is found in the Central African Republic and possibly the Republic of the Congo.
