= Eresiomera cornesi =

Scientific classification
- Domain: Eukaryota
- Kingdom: Animalia
- Phylum: Arthropoda
- Class: Insecta
- Order: Lepidoptera
- Family: Lycaenidae
- Genus: Eresiomera
- Species: E. cornesi

Binomial name
- Eresiomera cornesi (Stempffer, 1969)

Synonyms
- Pseuderesia cornesi Stempffer, 1969

Species of butterfly

Eresiomera cornesi, the Cornes' pearly, is a butterfly in the family Lycaenidae. It is found in western Nigeria. The habitat consists of forests.
