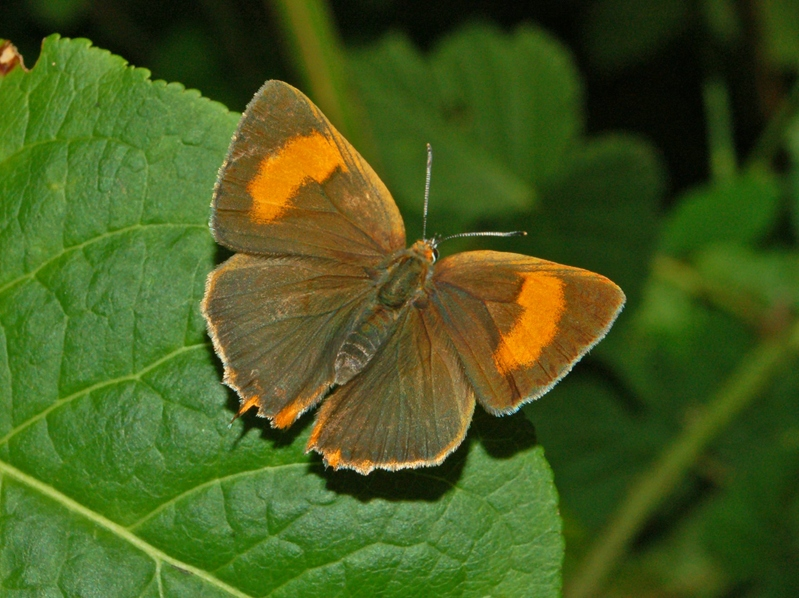
- Female
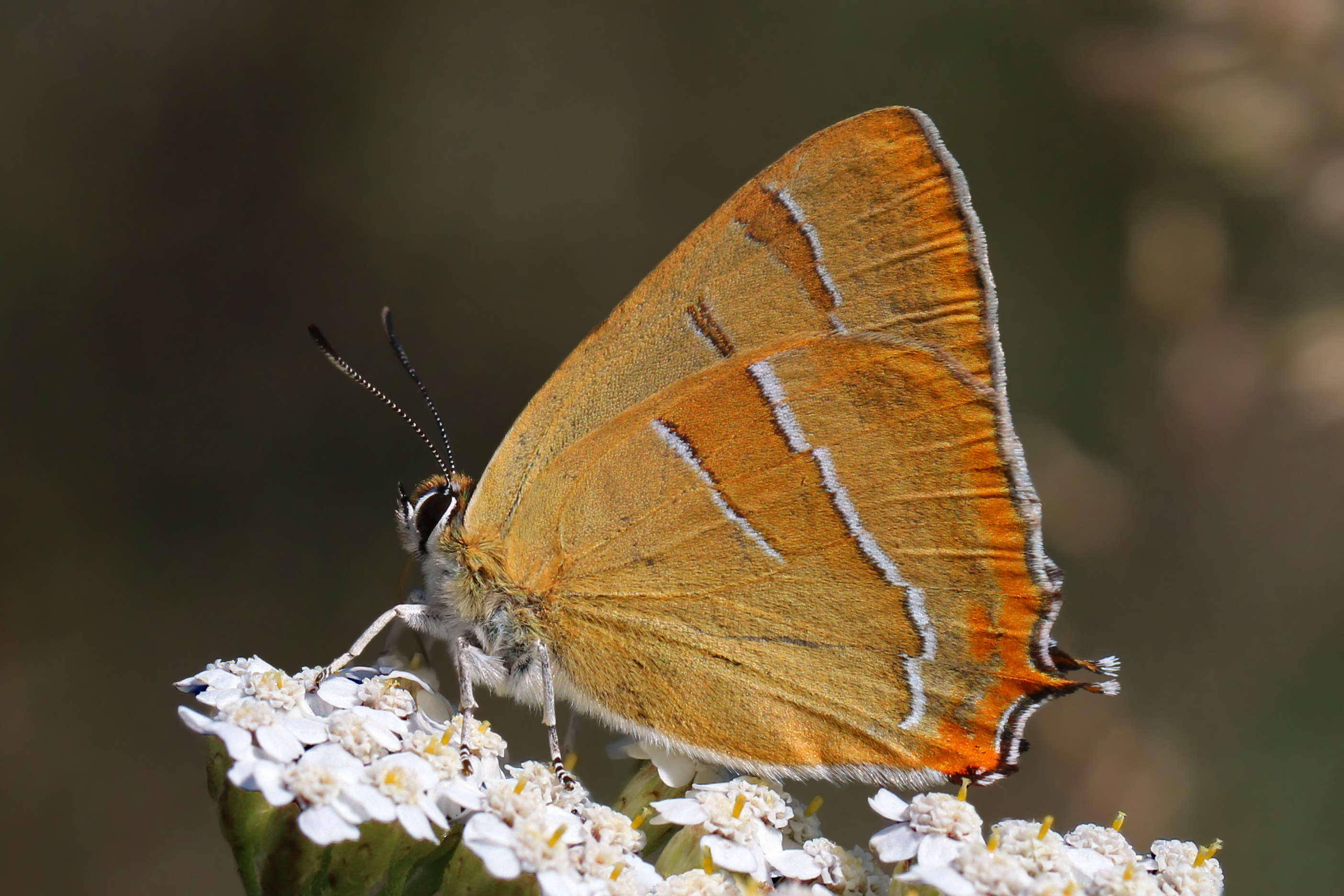
- in Bulgaria

Scientific classification
- Kingdom: Animalia
- Phylum: Arthropoda
- Clade: Pancrustacea
- Class: Insecta
- Order: Lepidoptera
- Family: Lycaenidae
- Genus: Thecla
- Species: T. betulae

Binomial name
- Thecla betulae (Linnaeus, 1758)

Subspecies
- See text

= Brown hairstreak =

Species of butterfly

The brown hairstreak (Thecla betulae) is a butterfly in the family Lycaenidae. The range includes most of the Palaearctic.

== Description ==
The following description of this butterfly was written by Adalbert Seitz in 1909:

Z. betulae L. Black-brown; male with a pale diffuse patch, female with a broad orange band beyond the crossveins. Underside ochreous, with dark-edged white lines. In North and Central Europe und Northern Asia eastward to the Pacific. Tutt name males without the pale diffuse patch beyond the crossveins ab. unicolor, while this patch is nearly white in ab. pallida Tutt. In ab. spinosae Gerh. there appear beyond the apex of the cell small orange-spots, which may be paler yellow than the discal spots of the female. The orange discal band of the female is sometimes narrow: ab. restricta Tutt, and sometimes broad (= ab. lata). females in which the band is pale ochreous instead of orange are ab. fisoni Wheeler, while the band is separated into several spots by the heavily black veins in ab. lineata Tutt. A very remarkable form is ab. cuneata Tutt, which bears a broad orange submarginal band on the hindwing. On the underside the white lines are sometimes more or less obsolete, or distorted (= ab. nucilinea). Or they may be strongly developed and modified into a kind of white-edged dark band in consequence of the interspace between the white lines being dark; this is ab. virgata Tutt. — Of the geographical races ongodai Tutt is the one nearest to the European form. The male has distinct discal lunules at the apex of the cell on the forewing but no pale patch beyond the same, the orange spots on the anal lobe of the hindwing and near the base of the tail being larger and more distinct. The orange spot of the female is very narrow, being traversed by the black veins. — crassa Leech (74 g) is much larger even than large European specimens (ab. major Tutt the tail being longer, and sometimes, not always, the colour of the underside darker. West China. — elwesi Leech (74 g) has the upperside of the (here figured) entirely orange except for the distal margin of the forewing and the sooty base of the hindwing, the male bearing brownish orange spots beyond the cell of the forewing. Central and West China. — Egg white, depressed, rough. Larva adult in June, clothed with short thin hairs, green with a yellow line on back and sides, yellow subdorsal oblique spots and a brown retractile head; on certain Prunus and Amygdalus, more rarely on birch, hazel and cherry. Pupa very smooth, rounded everywhere, pale brown, with thin lighter and darker markings; although fastened only by the cremaster, not by a girth, it is closely applied with its underside to its support The butterfliesoccur from July until late in October near woods, in avenues and gardens. They rest concealed among the foliage, and can fly rather fast and without interruption. They visit flowers, particularly umbellifers, and have also been observed at bait. They are plentiful wherever they occur, being very abundant in some years. In opposition to other observers I have sometimes seen 3 or 4 males resting together on a leaf.

== Subspecies ==
- T. b. betulae Europe, northern Caucasus, Transcaucasia, Saur, Tarbagatai, Dzhungarsky Alatau, Siberia, Amur, Ussuri. Larva on Prunus spinosa (Caucasus), Crataegus sanguinea, (southern Altai, Saur)
- T. b. crassa Leech, 1894 southern Ussuri. Larva on Prunus padus, Prunus mandshurica
- T. b. ongodai Tutt, 1908 Altai
- T. b. coreana (Nire, 1919) Korea. Larva on Fabaceae
- T. b. elwesi Leech, 1890 western and central China
- T. b. yiliguozigounae Huang & Murayama, 1992 China

== Appearance and behaviour ==
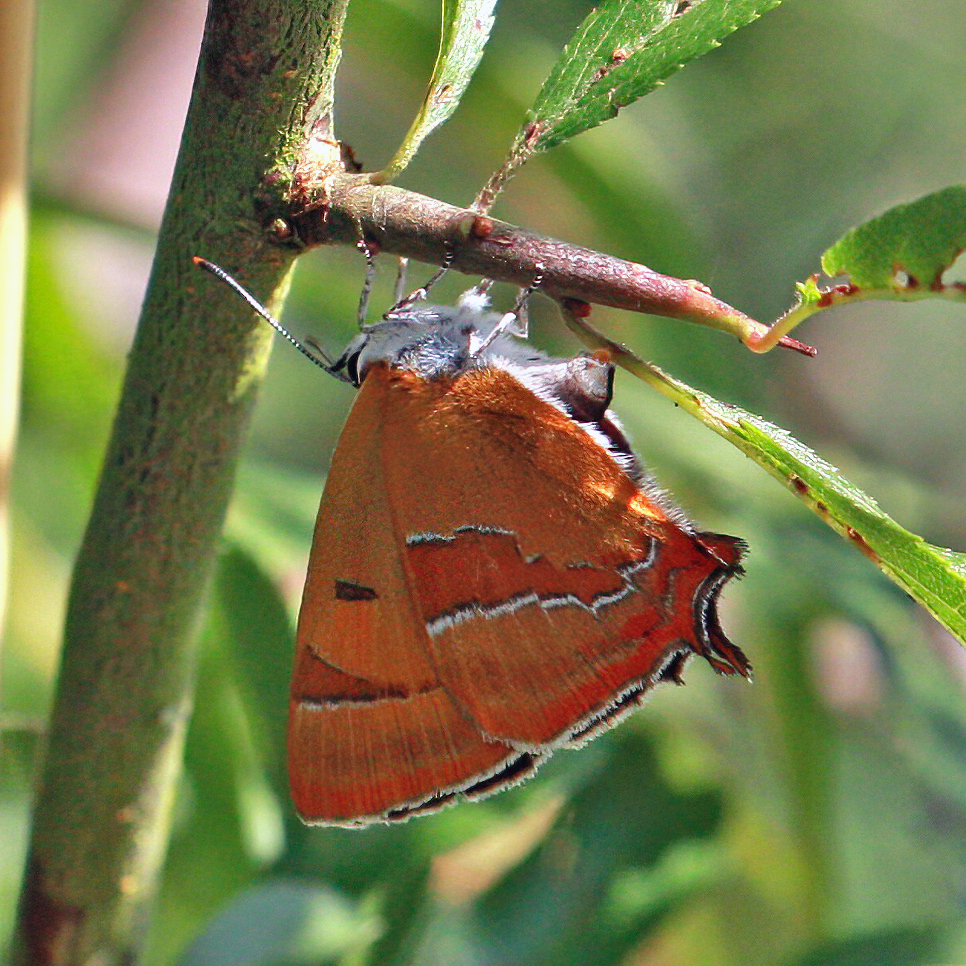
female ready to lay an egg

A little butterfly that is found along hedges, scrub, and wood edges but is often overlooked since it spends much of its time high in the tree canopy. Like the purple emperor this butterfly uses 'master trees', usually European ash (Fraxinus excelsior). Males and unmated females congregate at the tops of isolated trees. Once mated the female descends to lower levels to begin laying her eggs. Males rarely descend and both feed mainly on honeydew. Both sexes are dark brown on the upperside with orange tails. The female also has a bright orange band across both forewings. The undersides are similar in both sexes and are bright orange with two white streaks.

== Life cycle and food plants ==
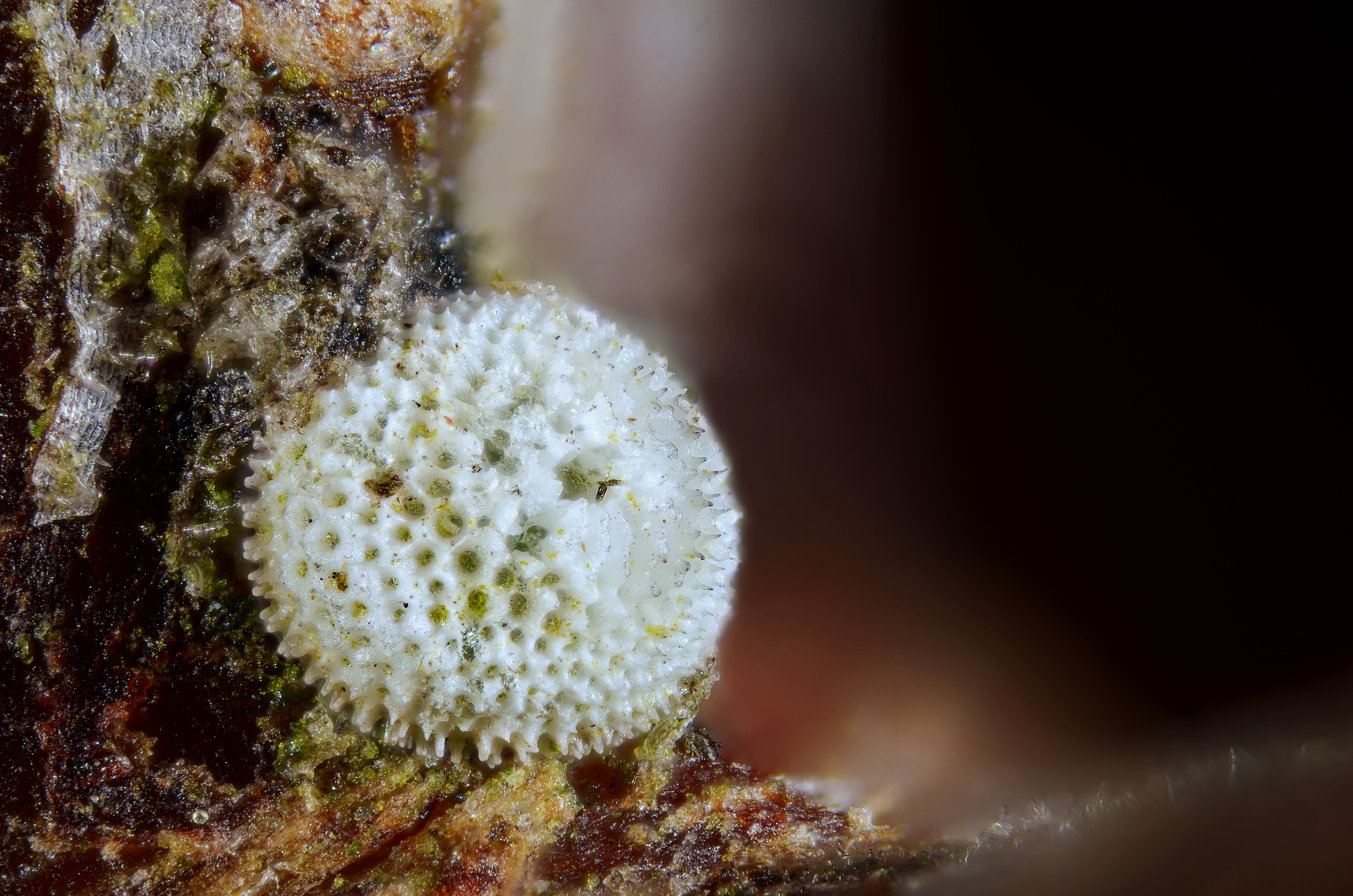
Egg

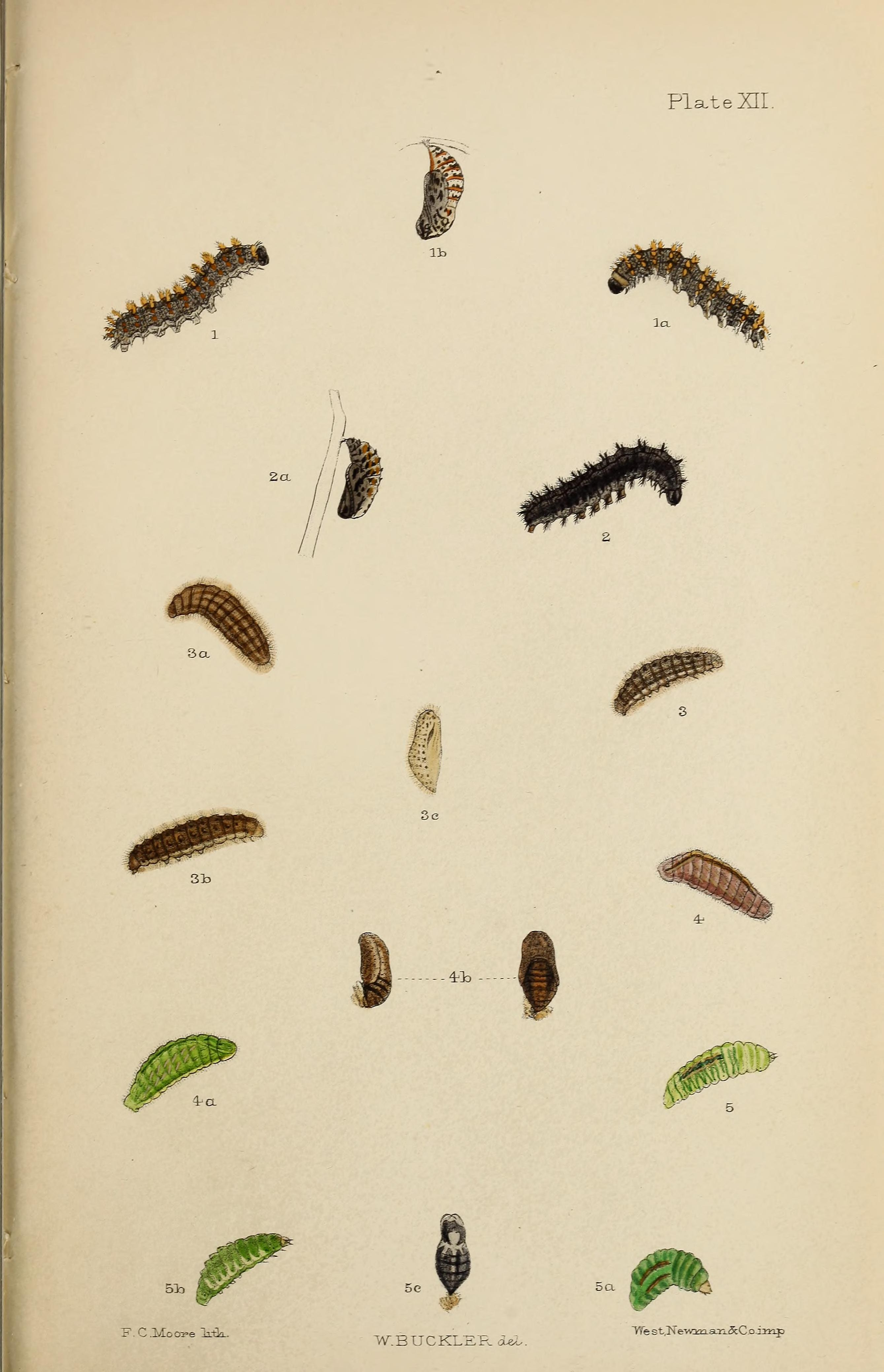
Figs. 4, 4a larva after last moult 4b pupa side view and back view

In Europe the female lays her eggs on blackthorn (Prunus spinosa) in late August which overwinter, hatching the following spring when the buds are breaking. It has been found that the best way to find breeding sites for this species is to look for the conspicuous white eggs in the winter. The larvae are extremely well camouflaged and feed only at night, remaining motionless during the day. Pupation takes place in leaf litter on the ground in late June or early July and are attractive to ants who will bury them in shallow cells.

== Conservation status ==
This butterfly species is protected in the UK via Schedule 5 of the Wildlife and Countryside Act of 1981.

== See also ==
- List of butterflies of Great Britain
