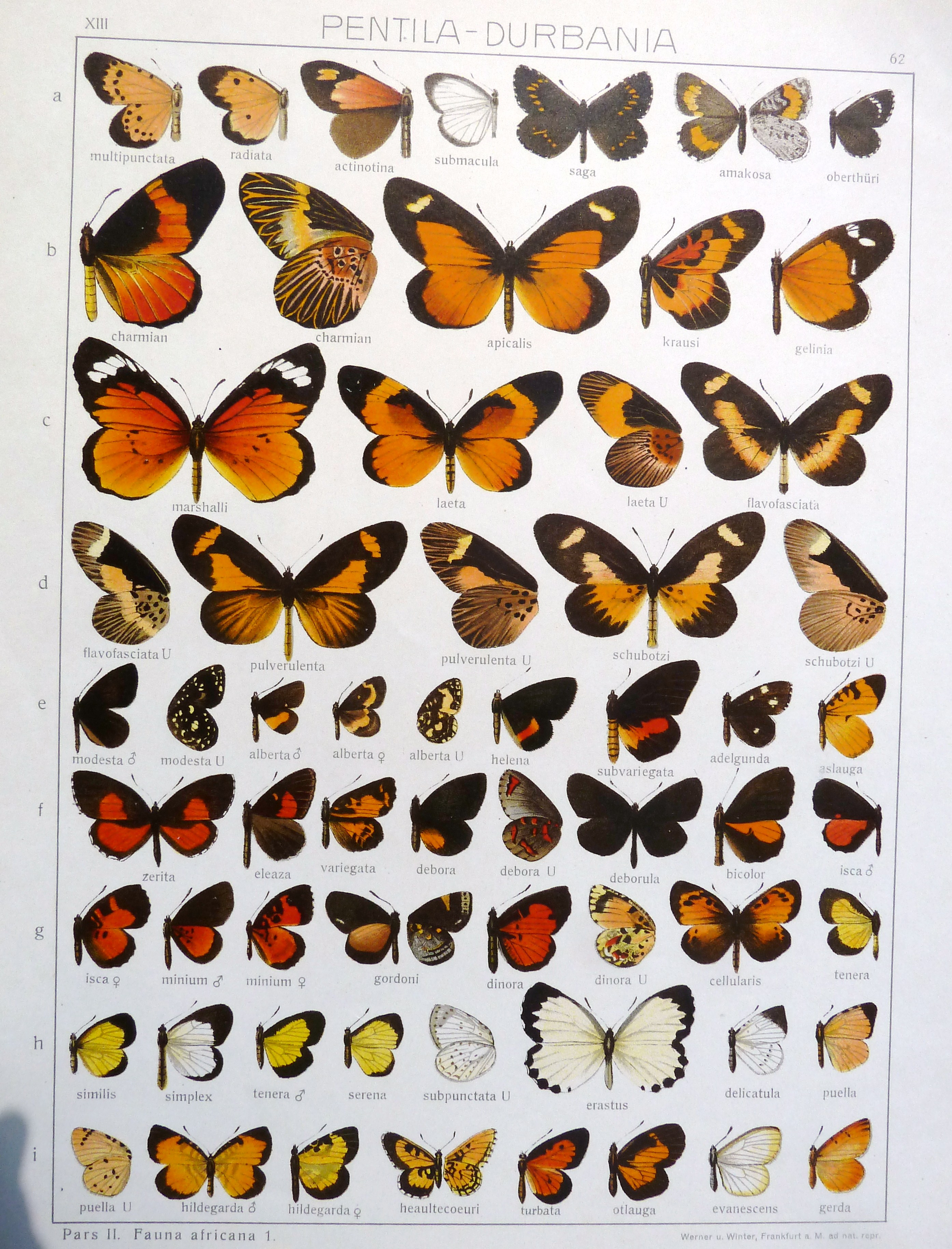
- In Adalbert Seitz's Fauna Africana

Scientific classification
- Kingdom: Animalia
- Phylum: Arthropoda
- Clade: Pancrustacea
- Class: Insecta
- Order: Lepidoptera
- Family: Lycaenidae
- Genus: Eresiomera
- Species: E. bicolor

Binomial name
- Eresiomera bicolor (Grose-Smith & Kirby, 1890)

Synonyms
- Pseuderesia bicolor Grose-Smith & Kirby, 1890

= Eresiomera bicolor =

Species of butterfly

Eresiomera bicolor, the western pearly, is a butterfly in the family Lycaenidae. It is found in Sierra Leone, Liberia, Ivory Coast, Ghana, Togo and Nigeria. The habitat consists of forests.

Adults feed on flower nectar from extrafloral nectaries.

Torben Larsen developed a species numbering system for his 2005 publication Butterflies of West Africa. This species is #193. The 'Larsen' numbers have since been used with permission in A Sharp Eye on Butterflies of Ghana.
