= Eresiomera jacksoni =

Scientific classification
- Domain: Eukaryota
- Kingdom: Animalia
- Phylum: Arthropoda
- Class: Insecta
- Order: Lepidoptera
- Family: Lycaenidae
- Genus: Eresiomera
- Species: E. jacksoni

Binomial name
- Eresiomera jacksoni (Stempffer, 1969)

Synonyms
- Pseuderesia jacksoni Stempffer, 1969

Species of butterfly

Eresiomera jacksoni, the Jackson's pearly, is a butterfly in the family Lycaenidae. It is found in Ivory Coast and Ghana. The habitat consists of forests.
