= Thecla leechii =

Ferruginous hairstreak

Scientific classification
- Domain: Eukaryota
- Kingdom: Animalia
- Phylum: Arthropoda
- Class: Insecta
- Order: Lepidoptera
- Family: Lycaenidae
- Genus: Thecla
- Species: T. leechii

Binomial name
- Thecla leechii De Nicéville 1892

Species of butterfly

Thecla leechii, the ferruginous hairstreak, is a small butterfly found in India that belongs to the lycaenids or blues family.

== See also ==
- List of butterflies of India (Lycaenidae)
