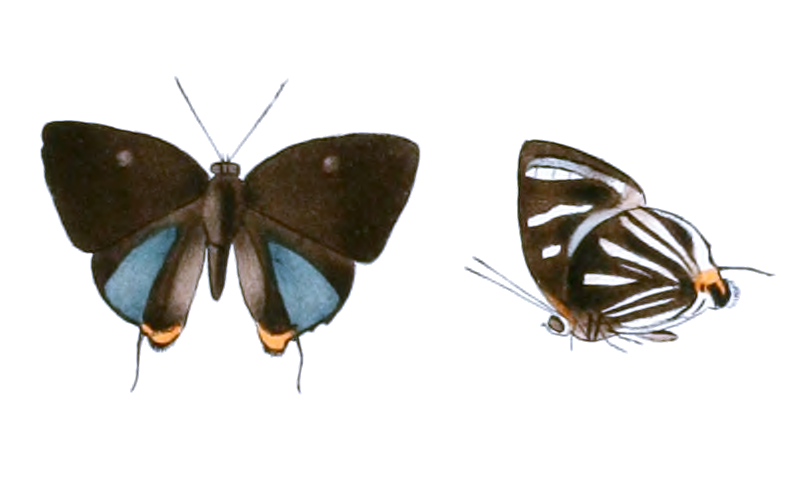

Scientific classification
- Domain: Eukaryota
- Kingdom: Animalia
- Phylum: Arthropoda
- Class: Insecta
- Order: Lepidoptera
- Family: Lycaenidae
- Genus: Thereus
- Species: T. pedusa

Binomial name
- Thereus pedusa (Hewitson, 1867)

Synonyms
- Thecla pedusa Hewitson, 1867

= Thereus pedusa =

Species of butterfly

Thereus pedusa is a species of butterfly of the family Lycaenidae. It is found in Brazil (Amazon) and the Guianas.
