= Eresiomera ouesso =

Scientific classification
- Domain: Eukaryota
- Kingdom: Animalia
- Phylum: Arthropoda
- Class: Insecta
- Order: Lepidoptera
- Family: Lycaenidae
- Genus: Eresiomera
- Species: E. ouesso

Binomial name
- Eresiomera ouesso (Stempffer, 1962)

Synonyms
- Pseuderesia ouesso Stempffer, 1962

Species of butterfly

Eresiomera ouesso is a butterfly in the family Lycaenidae. It is found in Cameroon and the Republic of the Congo.
