= Eresiomera rougeoti =

Scientific classification
- Domain: Eukaryota
- Kingdom: Animalia
- Phylum: Arthropoda
- Class: Insecta
- Order: Lepidoptera
- Family: Lycaenidae
- Genus: Eresiomera
- Species: E. rougeoti

Binomial name
- Eresiomera rougeoti (Stempffer, 1961)

Synonyms
- Pseuderesia rougeoti Stempffer, 1961

Species of butterfly

Eresiomera rougeoti is a butterfly in the family Lycaenidae. It is found in Cameroon, Bioko, Gabon, the Republic of the Congo, Uganda and north-western Tanzania.
