= Eresiomera nigeriana =

Scientific classification
- Domain: Eukaryota
- Kingdom: Animalia
- Phylum: Arthropoda
- Class: Insecta
- Order: Lepidoptera
- Family: Lycaenidae
- Genus: Eresiomera
- Species: E. nigeriana

Binomial name
- Eresiomera nigeriana (Stempffer, 1962)

Synonyms
- Pseuderesia nigeriana Stempffer, 1962

Species of butterfly

Eresiomera nigeriana, the Nigerian pearly, is a butterfly in the family Lycaenidae. It is found in Nigeria. The habitat consists of forests.
