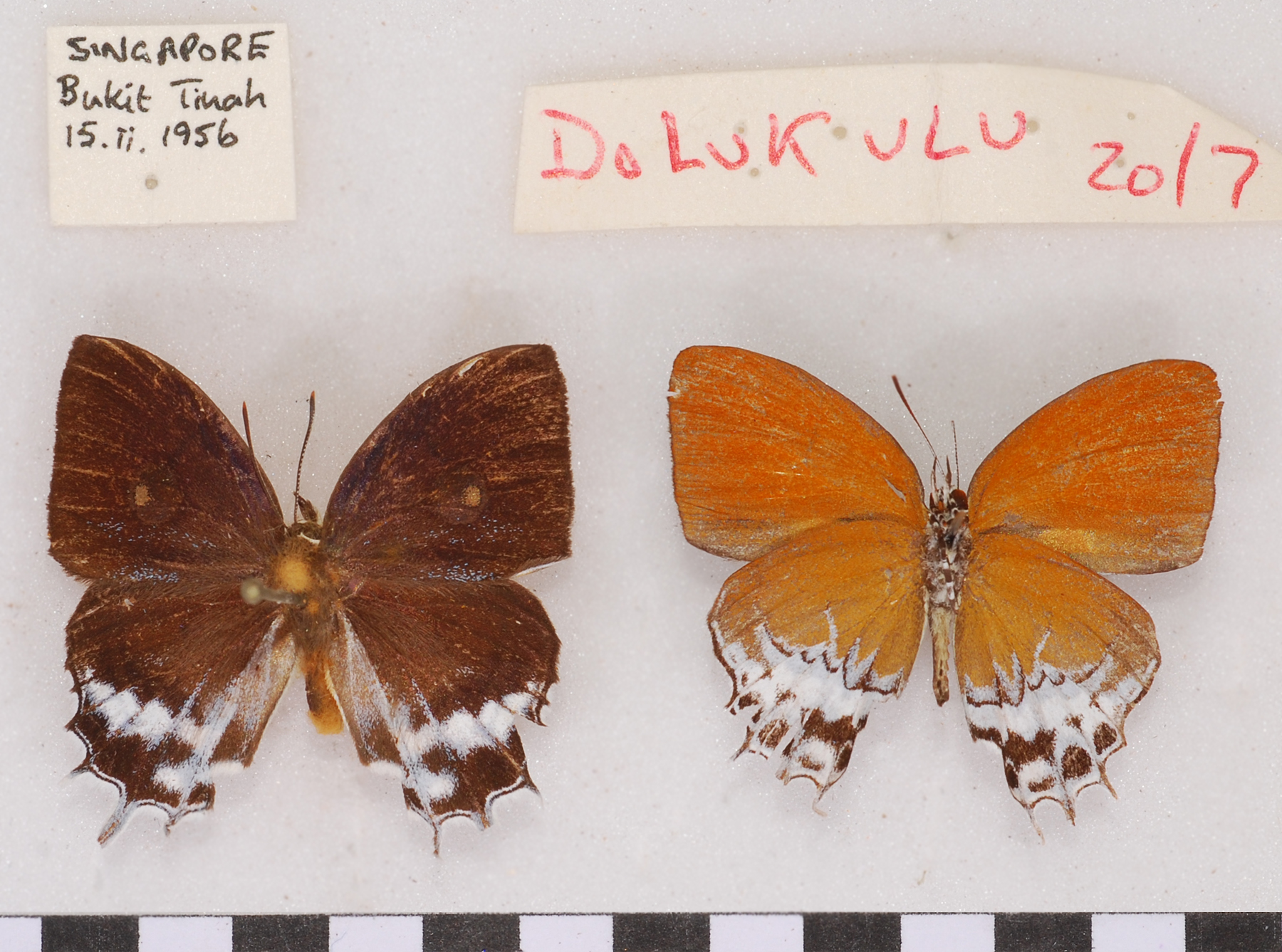

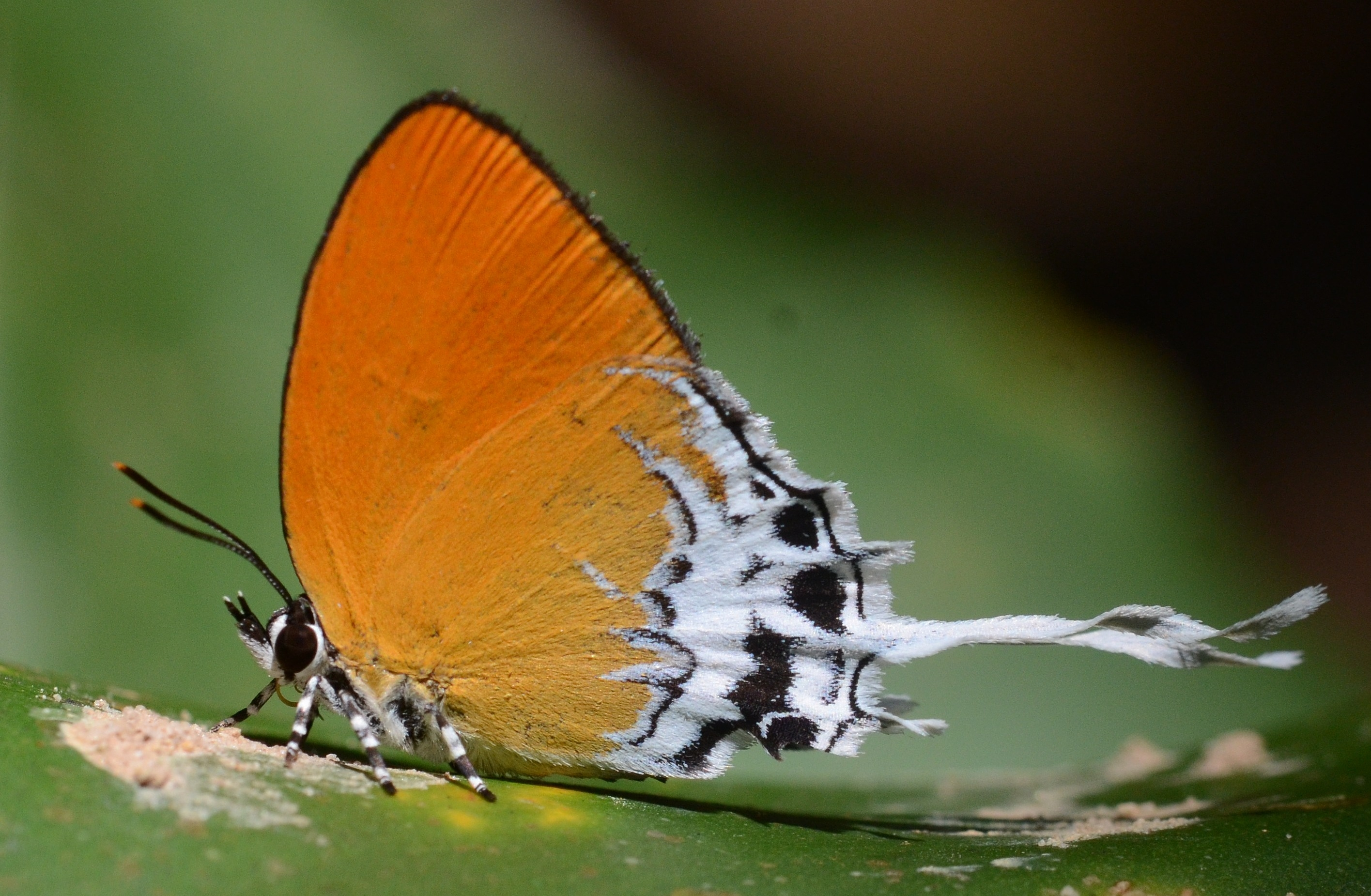

Scientific classification
- Domain: Eukaryota
- Kingdom: Animalia
- Phylum: Arthropoda
- Class: Insecta
- Order: Lepidoptera
- Family: Lycaenidae
- Genus: Eooxylides
- Species: E. tharis

Binomial name
- Eooxylides tharis (Geyer, [1837])

Synonyms
- Oxylides tharis Geyer, [1837]; Myrina pharis Westwood, [1851]; Eooxylides distanti Riley, 1942

= Eooxylides tharis =

Species of butterfly

Eooxylides tharis, the branded imperial, is a butterfly in the family Lycaenidae. It was described by Carl Geyer in 1837. It is found in the Indomalayan realm.

== Subspecies ==
- Eooxylides tharis tharis (Sumatra)
- Eooxylides tharis distanti Riley, 1942 (Peninsular Malaysia, Singapore, Tioman, Thailand)
- Eooxylides tharis latipictus Fruhstorfer, 1904 (Nias)
- Eooxylides tharis tharisides Fruhstorfer, 1904 (Borneo)
- Eooxylides tharis javanicus Fruhstorfer, 1904 (Java)
- Eooxylides tharis enganicus Fruhstorfer, 1904 (Enggano)
- Eooxylides tharis watsoni van Eecke, 1914 (Simuelue)
- Eooxylides tharis ritsemae van Eecke, 1914 (Belitung)

== Gallery ==
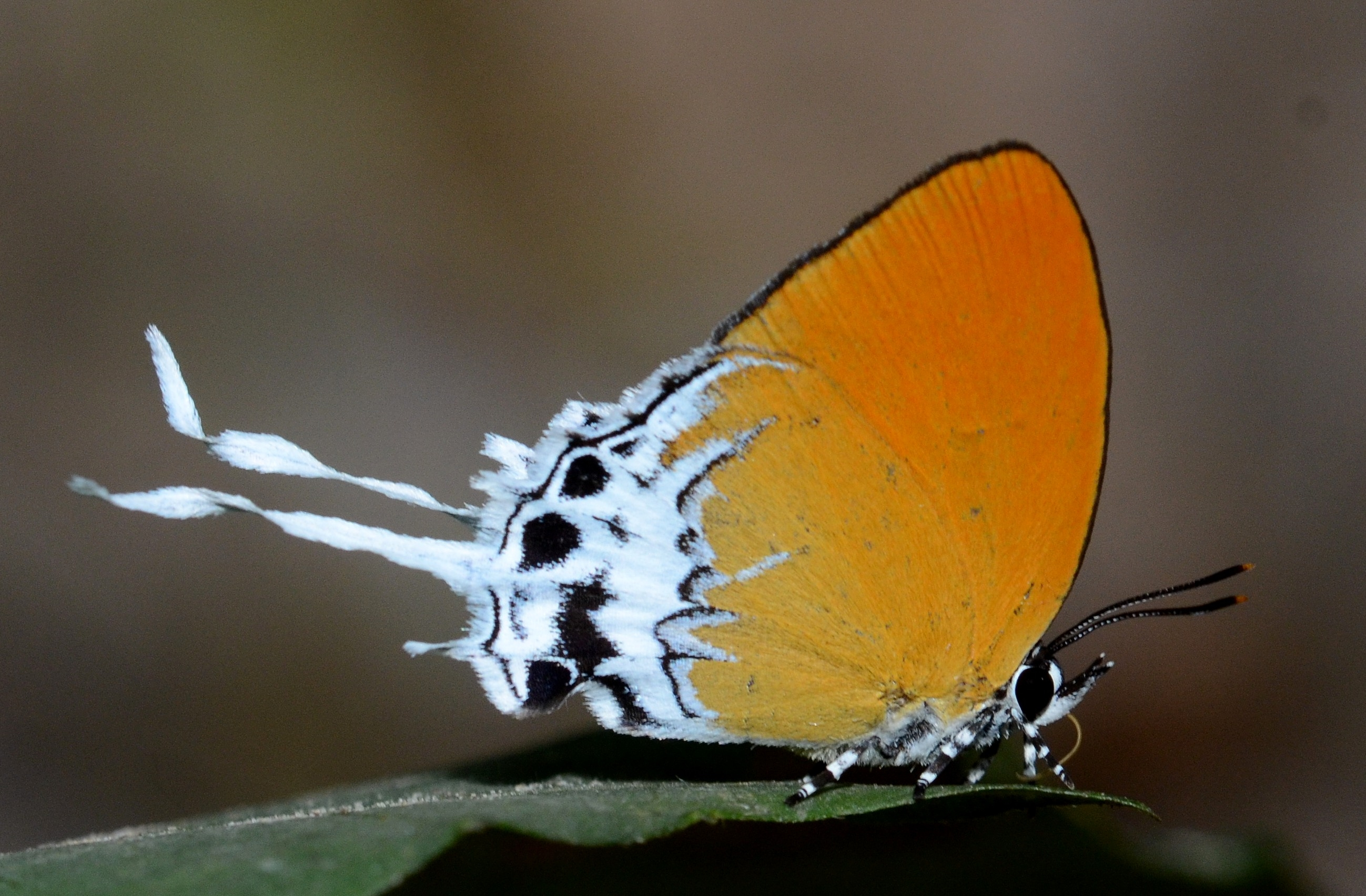
Bukit Gasing, Malaysia
