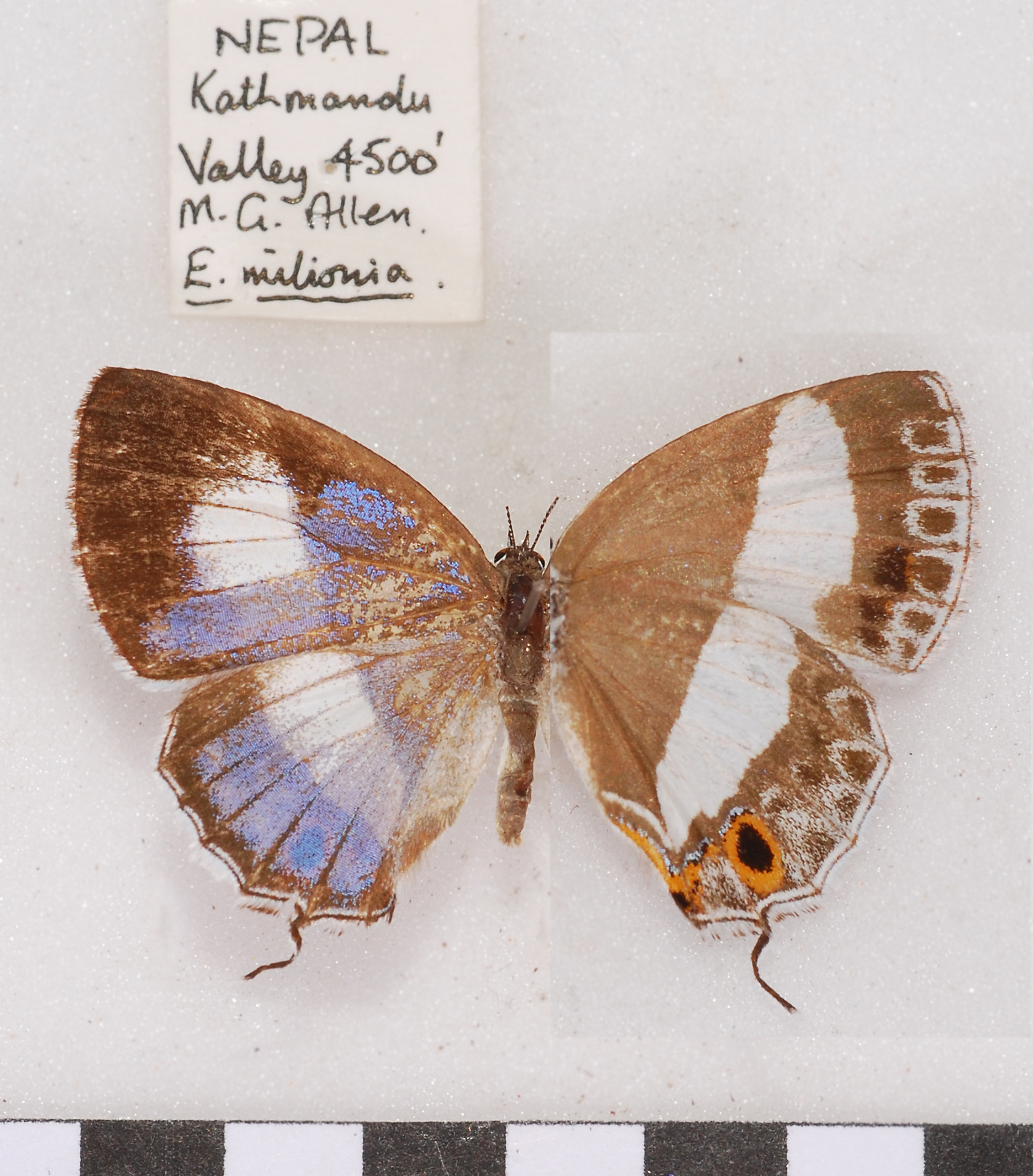
- Euaspa milionia, male, set specimen, Nepal, Alan Cassidy photo.
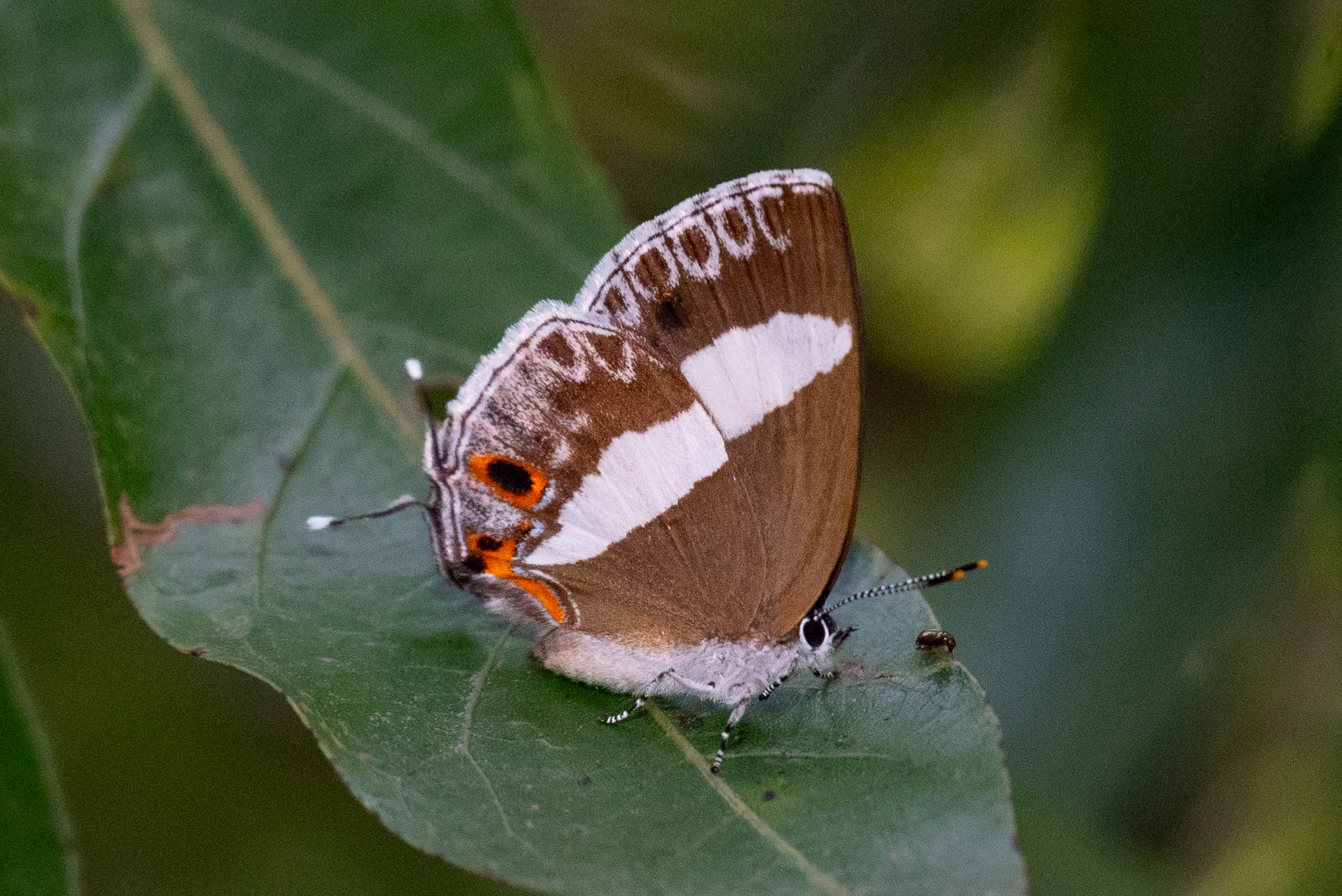

Scientific classification
- Kingdom: Animalia
- Phylum: Arthropoda
- Class: Insecta
- Order: Lepidoptera
- Family: Lycaenidae
- Genus: Euaspa
- Species: E. milionia

Binomial name
- Euaspa milionia (Hewitson, 1869)

= Euaspa milionia =

Water hairstreak

Species of butterfly

Euaspa milionia, the water hairstreak, is a small butterfly found in India, Nepal and (E. m. formosana Nomura, 1931) Taiwan that belongs to the lycaenids or blues family.

== See also ==
- https://www.researchgate.net/publication/373433875_New_Distribution_Record_of_Euaspa_milionia_Hewitson_1869_Lepidoptera_Lycaenidae_Theclinae_From_Sikkim_India
- List of butterflies of India
- List of butterflies of India (Lycaenidae)
