= Eresiomera mapongwa =

Scientific classification
- Domain: Eukaryota
- Kingdom: Animalia
- Phylum: Arthropoda
- Class: Insecta
- Order: Lepidoptera
- Family: Lycaenidae
- Genus: Eresiomera
- Species: E. mapongwa

Binomial name
- Eresiomera mapongwa (Holland, 1893)

Synonyms
- Durbania mapongwa Holland, 1893

Species of butterfly

Eresiomera mapongwa is a butterfly in the family Lycaenidae. It is found in Gabon.
