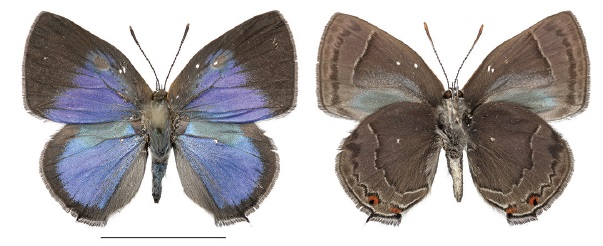
- Male
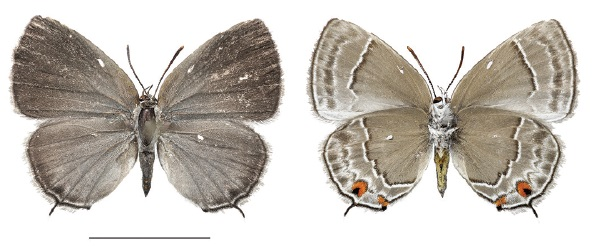
- Female

Scientific classification
- Domain: Eukaryota
- Kingdom: Animalia
- Phylum: Arthropoda
- Class: Insecta
- Order: Lepidoptera
- Family: Lycaenidae
- Genus: Thereus
- Species: T. lomalarga

Binomial name
- Thereus lomalarga Robbins, Heredia & Busby, 2015

= Thereus lomalarga =

Species of butterfly

Thereus lomalarga is a species of butterfly of the family Lycaenidae. It is found from Costa Rica to the western slope of the Andes in Ecuador. It occurs in the great variety of forested habitats.

The larvae feed on Oryctanthus alveolatus.

== Etymology ==
The species is named for Loma Larga, a housing development on the outskirts of Parque Nacional Natural Farallones de Cali.
