= Eresiomera kiellandi =

Scientific classification
- Kingdom: Animalia
- Phylum: Arthropoda
- Class: Insecta
- Order: Lepidoptera
- Family: Lycaenidae
- Genus: Eresiomera
- Species: E. kiellandi

Binomial name
- Eresiomera kiellandi Larsen, 1998

Species of butterfly

Eresiomera kiellandi is a butterfly in the family Lycaenidae. It is found in north-western Tanzania. The habitat consists of forests.
