= Eresiomera campbelli =

Scientific classification
- Domain: Eukaryota
- Kingdom: Animalia
- Phylum: Arthropoda
- Class: Insecta
- Order: Lepidoptera
- Family: Lycaenidae
- Genus: Eresiomera
- Species: E. campbelli

Binomial name
- Eresiomera campbelli Collins & Larsen, 1998

Species of butterfly

Eresiomera campbelli is a butterfly in the family Lycaenidae. It is found in Cameroon, the Republic of the Congo and the Democratic Republic of the Congo.

Adults have been recorded in February.
