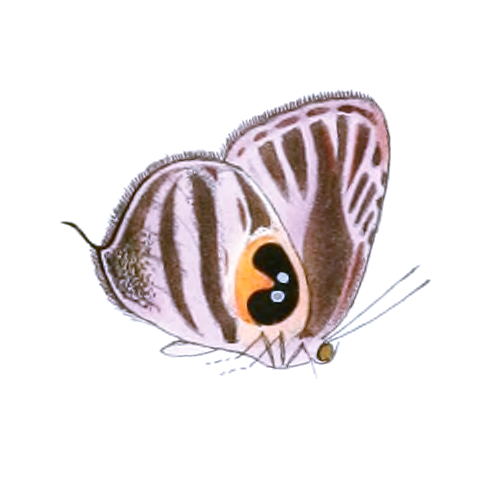

Scientific classification
- Domain: Eukaryota
- Kingdom: Animalia
- Phylum: Arthropoda
- Class: Insecta
- Order: Lepidoptera
- Family: Lycaenidae
- Genus: Enos
- Species: E. mazurka

Binomial name
- Enos mazurka (Hewitson, 1867)

Synonyms
- Thecla mazurka Hewitson, 1867

= Enos mazurka =

Species of butterfly

Enos mazurka is a butterfly in the family Lycaenidae. It is found in Brazil (Amazon).
