= Eresiomera rutilo =

Scientific classification
- Domain: Eukaryota
- Kingdom: Animalia
- Phylum: Arthropoda
- Class: Insecta
- Order: Lepidoptera
- Family: Lycaenidae
- Genus: Eresiomera
- Species: E. rutilo

Binomial name
- Eresiomera rutilo (Druce, 1910)

Synonyms
- Pseuderesia rutilo Druce, 1910

Species of butterfly

Eresiomera rutilo is a butterfly in the family Lycaenidae. It is found in Cameroon, Gabon, the Republic of the Congo and western Uganda.
