= Pseuderesia vidua =

Scientific classification
- Domain: Eukaryota
- Kingdom: Animalia
- Phylum: Arthropoda
- Class: Insecta
- Order: Lepidoptera
- Family: Lycaenidae
- Genus: Pseuderesia
- Species: P. vidua

Binomial name
- Pseuderesia vidua Talbot, 1937

Synonyms
- Pseuderesia eleaza vidua Talbot, 1937

Species of butterfly

Pseuderesia vidua is a butterfly in the family Lycaenidae. It is found in western Kenya, Uganda, the Democratic Republic of the Congo (Lualaba) and north-western Tanzania. The habitat consists of forests.

The larvae feed on lichens growing on tree trunks.
