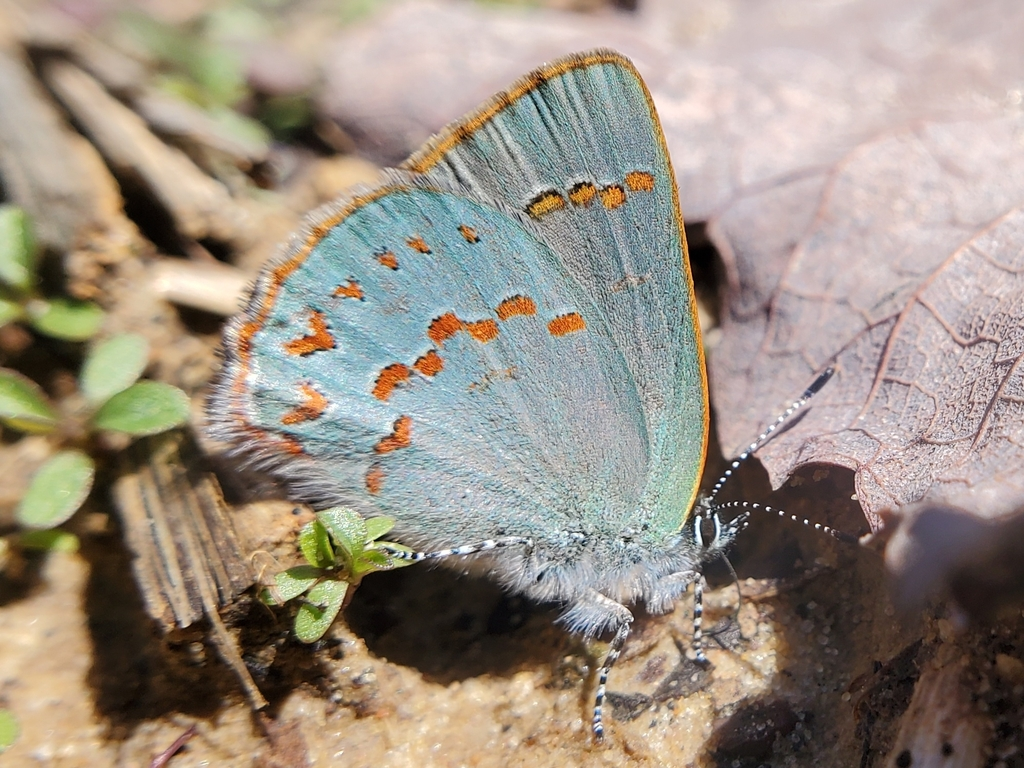

Conservation status
- Imperiled (NatureServe)

Scientific classification
- Kingdom: Animalia
- Phylum: Arthropoda
- Class: Insecta
- Order: Lepidoptera
- Family: Lycaenidae
- Genus: Erora
- Species: E. laeta

Binomial name
- Erora laeta (W.H. Edwards, 1862)
- The range from Erora laeta in West Virginia

Synonyms
- Thecla laeta W.H. Edwards, 1862; Thecla clothilde W.H. Edwards, 1863

= Erora laeta =

Species of butterfly

Erora laeta, the early hairstreak, is a butterfly of the family Lycaenidae. It is found in eastern Canada and the United States. The habitat consists of deciduous and mixed woods.

The wingspan is 21–24 mm.

The larvae are associated with American beech (Fagus grandifolia), and possibly also beaked hazelnut (Corylus cornuta). They feed on the leaves and fruits of their host plant.
