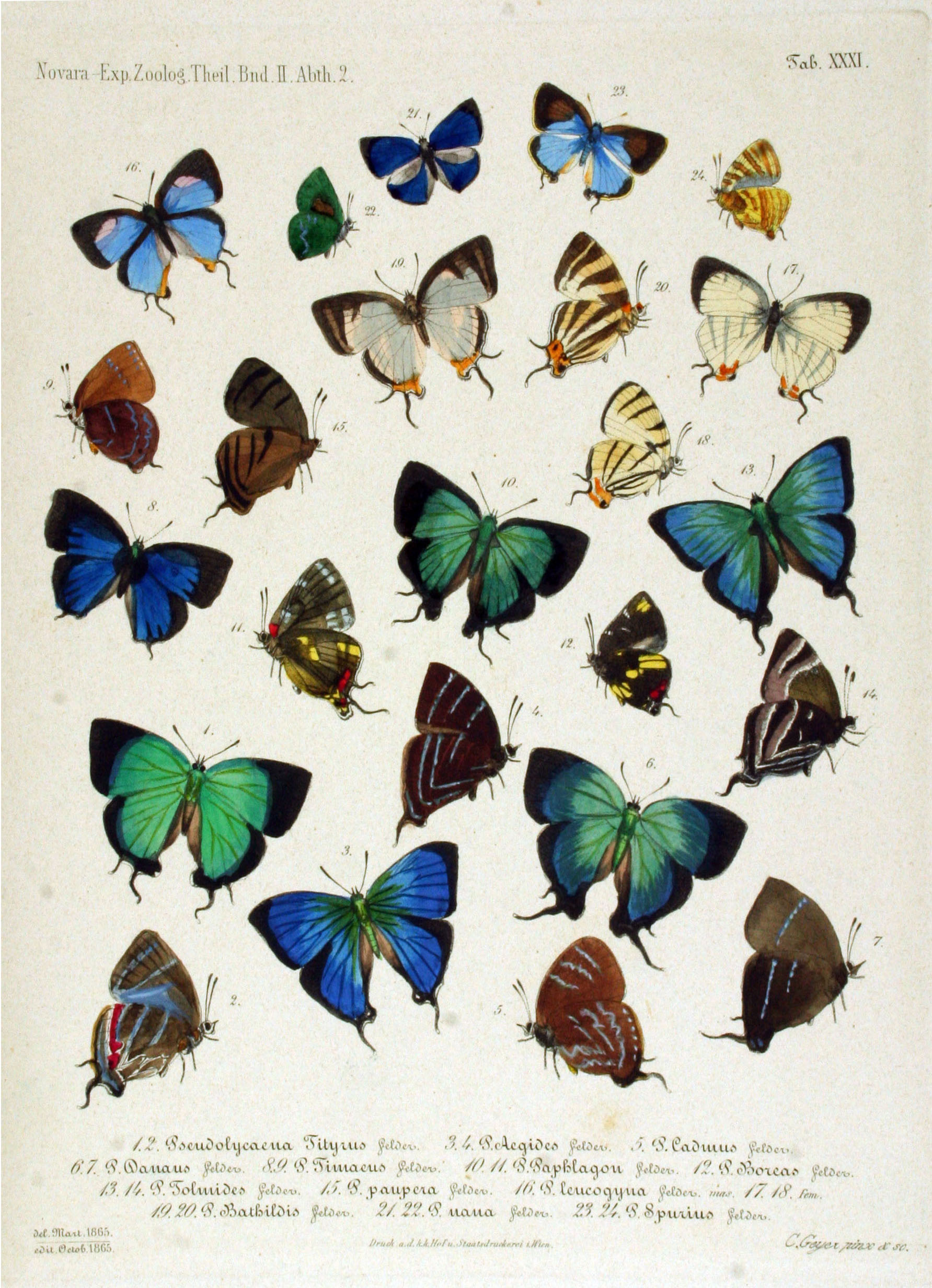
- Erora nana, figures 21 and 22

Scientific classification
- Kingdom: Animalia
- Phylum: Arthropoda
- Class: Insecta
- Order: Lepidoptera
- Family: Lycaenidae
- Subfamily: Theclinae
- Tribe: Eumaeini
- Genus: Erora; Scudder, 1872

Synonyms
- Androcona Johnson, Eisele & MacPherson, 1993; Sarracenota Johnson, Eisele & MacPherson, 1993; Necmitoura Johnson, Eisele & MacPherson, 1993

= Erora =

Butterfly genus in family Lycaenidae

Erora is a genus of butterflies in the family Lycaenidae erected by Samuel Hubbard Scudder in 1872. The species of this genus are found in the Nearctic and Neotropical realms.

== Species ==
- Erora laeta (Edwards, 1862) – early hairstreak
- Erora quaderna (Hewitson, 1868) – Arizona hairstreak
- Erora subflorens (Schaus, 1913)
- Erora biblia (Hewitson, 1868)
- Erora nitetis (Godman & Salvin, [1887])
- Erora aura (Godman & Salvin, [1887])
- Erora tella (Schaus, 1902)
- Erora phrosine (Druce, 1909)
- Erora carla (Schaus, 1902)
- Erora gabina (Godman & Salvin, [1887])
- Erora opisena (Druce, 1912)
- Erora campa (E. D. Jones, 1912)
- Erora badeta (Hewitson, 1873)
- Erora muridosca (Dyar, 1918)
- Erora lampetia (Godman & Salvin, [1887])
- Erora facuna (Hewitson, 1877)
- Erora senta (Draudt, 1920)
- Erora caespes (Druce, 1907)
- Erora melba (Hewitson, 1877)
- Erora nana (C. Felder & R. Felder, 1865)
- Erora lorina (Hewitson, 1874)
