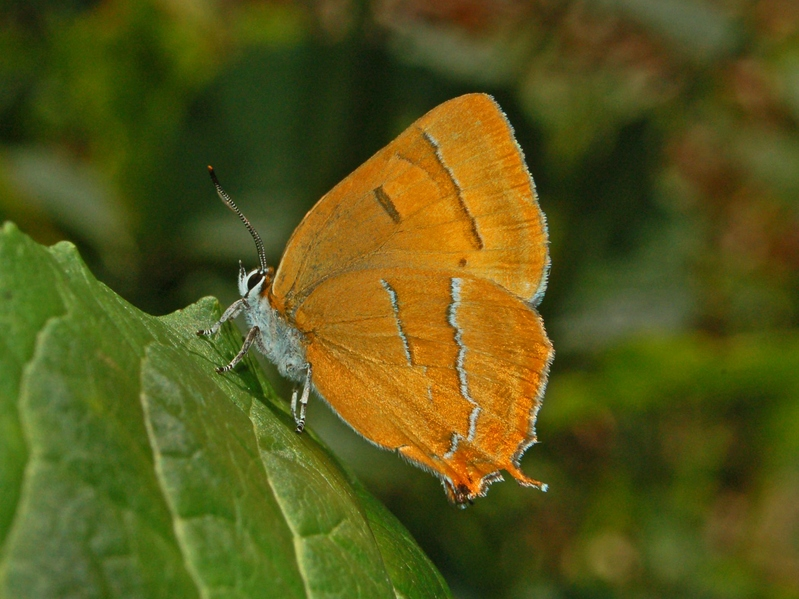
- Thecla betulae, lateral view

Scientific classification
- Kingdom: Animalia
- Phylum: Arthropoda
- Clade: Pancrustacea
- Class: Insecta
- Order: Lepidoptera
- Family: Lycaenidae
- Tribe: Theclini
- Genus: Thecla; Fabricius, 1807

= Thecla (butterfly) =

Butterfly genus in family Lycaenidae

Thecla is a genus of butterflies, described by Johan Christian Fabricius in 1807, belonging to the family Lycaenidae. The species are found in the Palaearctic.

== Species ==
Several, including:

- Thecla betulae (Linnaeus, 1758) - brown hairstreak
- Thecla betulina Staudinger, 1887
- Thecla ohyai Fujioka, 1994 China, Yunnan, Li-Kiang.
- Thecla chalybeia, De Nicéville 1892
- Thecla hemon (Cramer, 1775) formerly in the, then. wastebasket taxon "Thecla" sensu lato
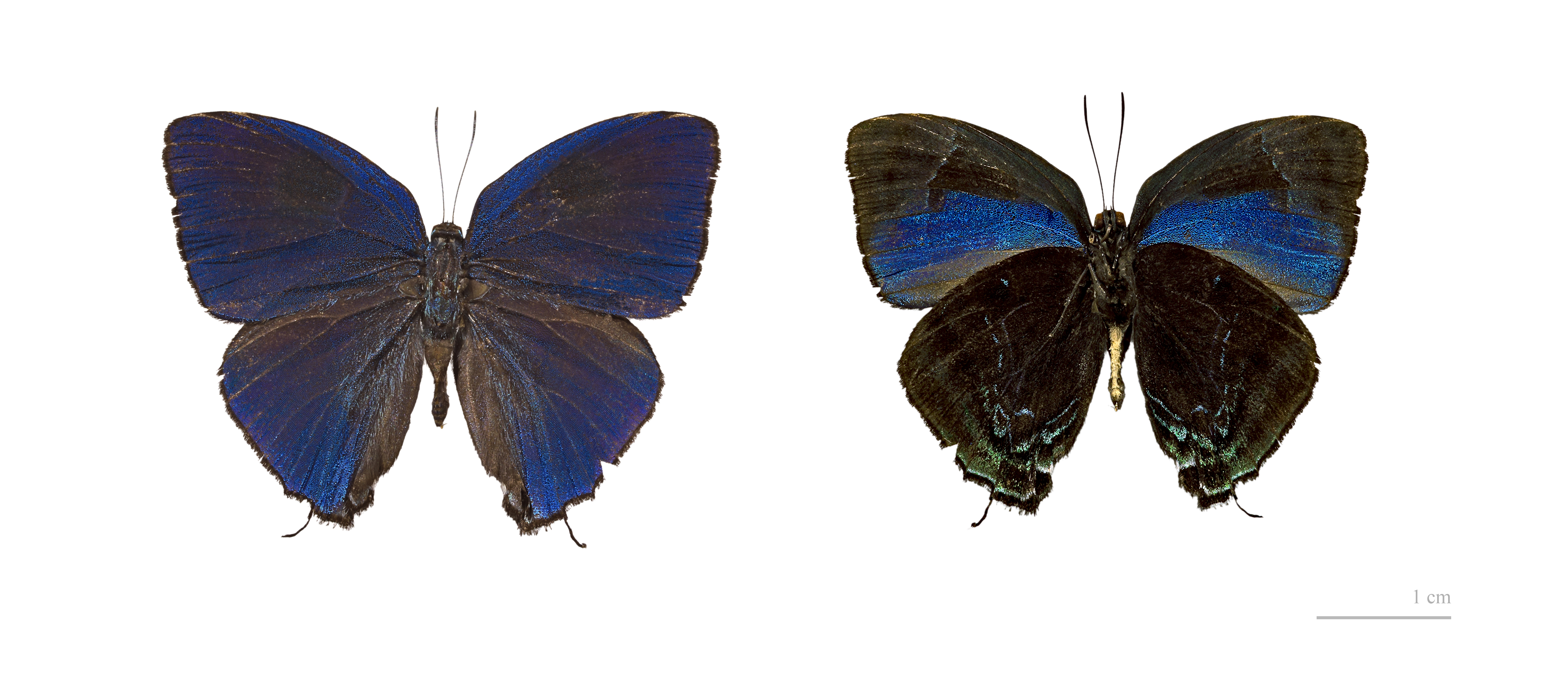
  Thecla hemon
  = Theritas hemon Cramer, 1775
- Thecla leechii, De Nicéville 1892
- Thecla letha, (Watson, 1896)
- Thecla pavo, (De Nicéville, 1887)
- Thecla ziha, (Hewitson, 1865)
