= Eumenia =

Scientific classification
- Kingdom: Animalia
- Phylum: Arthropoda
- Class: Insecta
- Order: Lepidoptera
- Family: Lycaenidae
- Genus: Eumenia

Butterfly genus in family Lycaenidae

Eumenia is a genus of butterflies in the family Lycaenidae. It includes the species Eumenia atala.
