= Eresiomera osheba =

Scientific classification
- Domain: Eukaryota
- Kingdom: Animalia
- Phylum: Arthropoda
- Class: Insecta
- Order: Lepidoptera
- Family: Lycaenidae
- Genus: Eresiomera
- Species: E. osheba

Binomial name
- Eresiomera osheba (Holland, 1890)

Synonyms
- Durbania osheba Holland, 1890; Pseuderesia osheba; Pseuderesia minium Druce, 1910; Pseuderesia milbraedi Schultze, 1912

Species of butterfly

Eresiomera osheba is a butterfly in the family Lycaenidae. It is found in Cameroon, Gabon, the Republic of the Congo and northern Angola.
