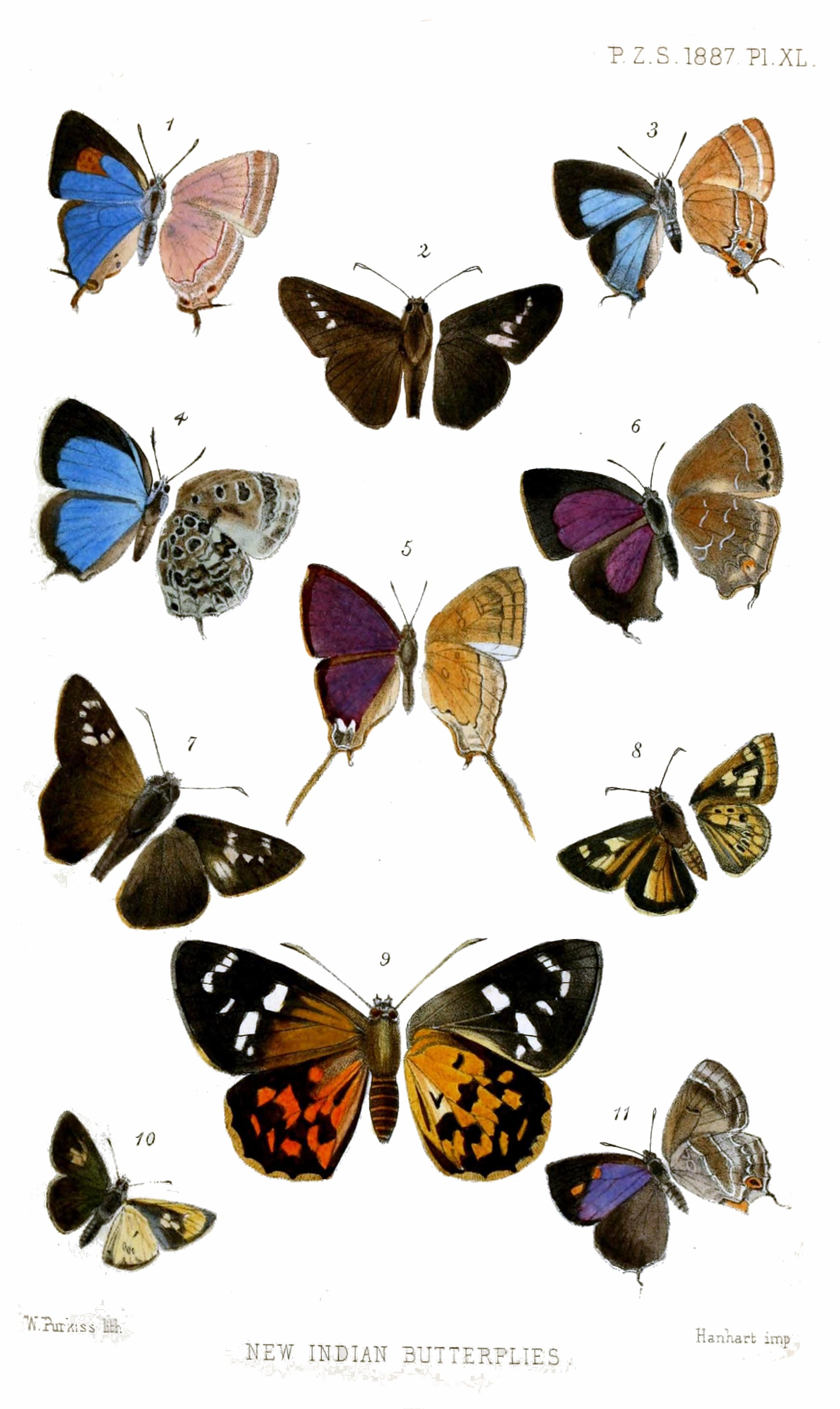
- Euaspa pavo figure 11

Scientific classification
- Domain: Eukaryota
- Kingdom: Animalia
- Phylum: Arthropoda
- Class: Insecta
- Order: Lepidoptera
- Family: Lycaenidae
- Tribe: Theclini
- Genus: Euaspa; Moore, 1884

= Euaspa =

Butterfly genus in family Lycaenidae

Euaspa is a genus of butterflies in the family Lycaenidae. They are native in the Indomalayan realm, found in areas from the Himalayas to Vietnam. They feed on oaks (Quercus spp.).

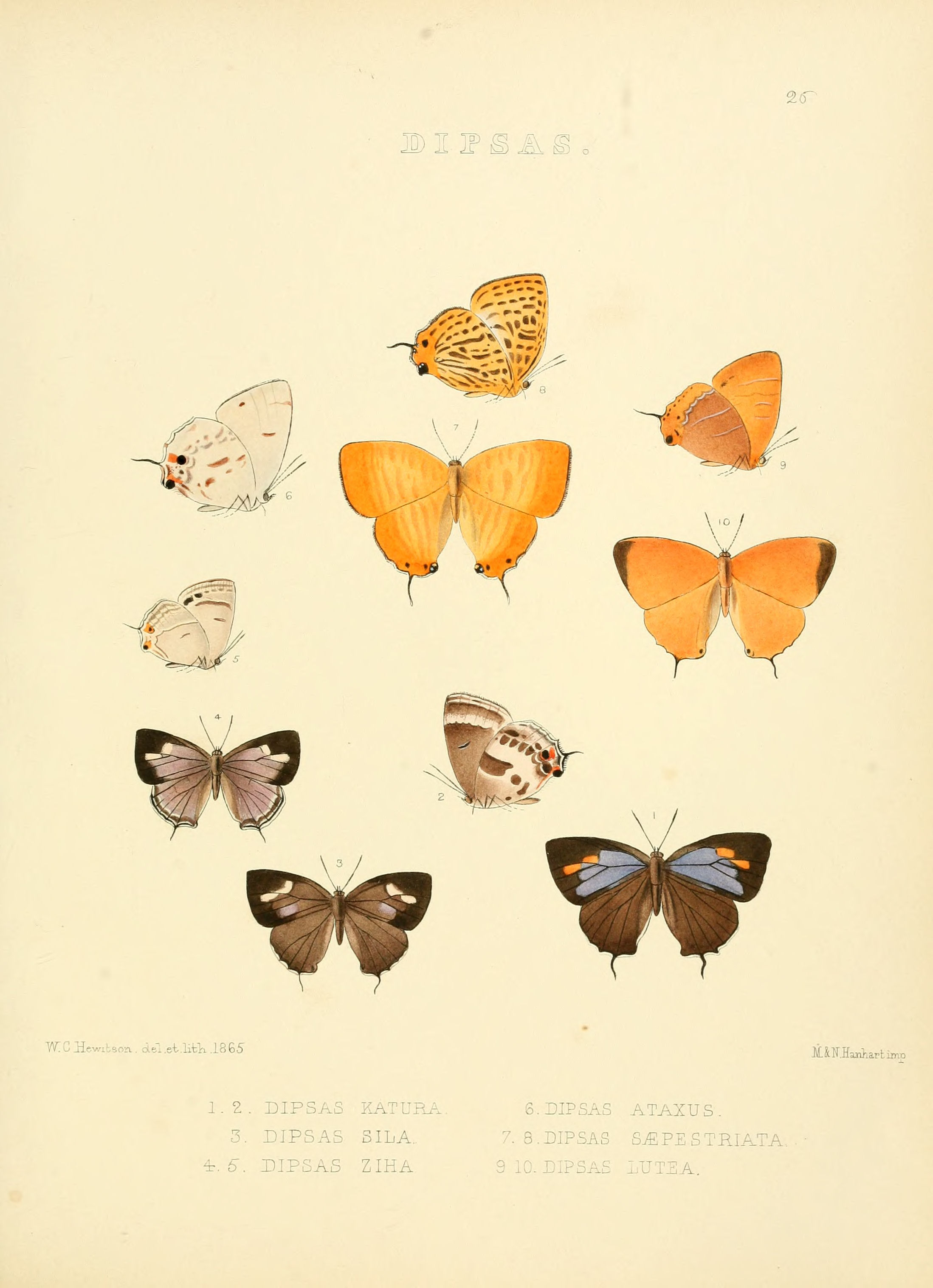
Euaspa ziha figs. 4 (male) and 5 (female)

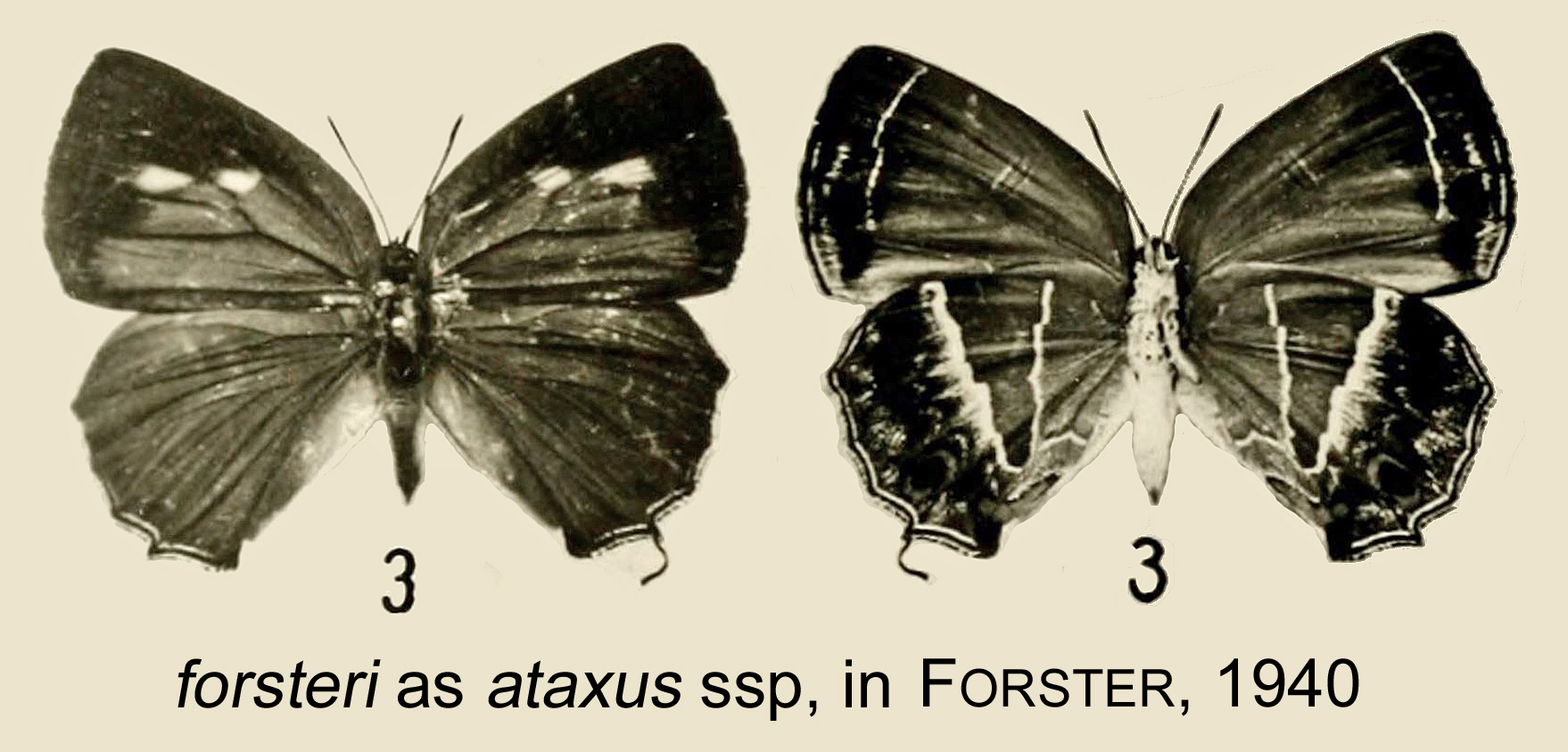
Euaspa forsteri

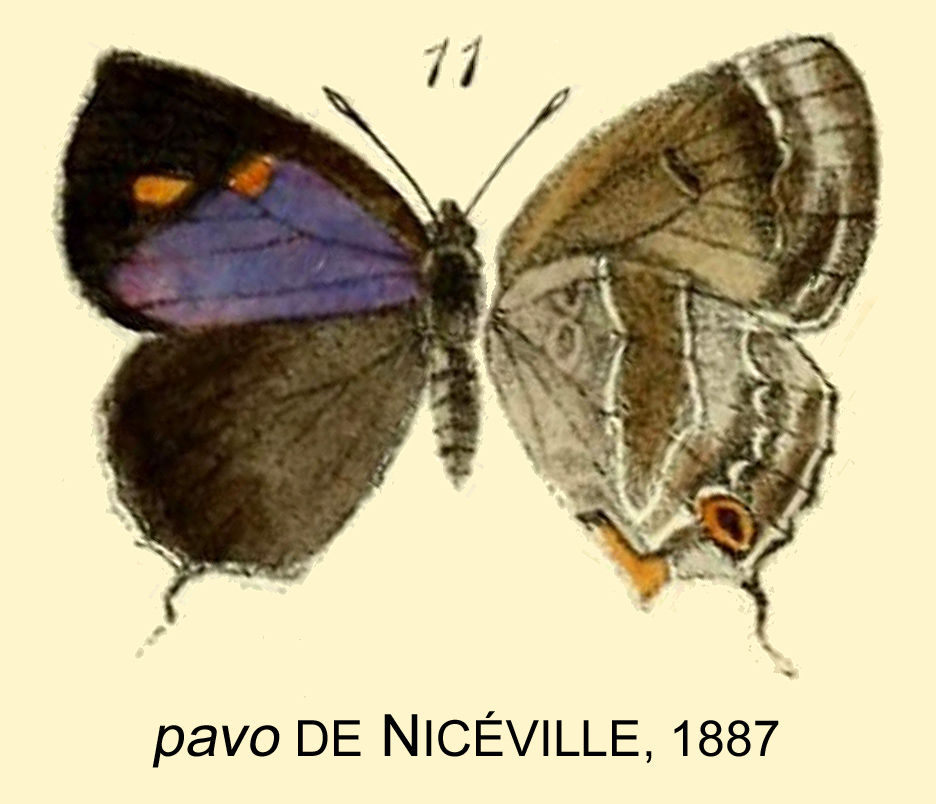
Euaspa pavo

== Species ==
- Euaspa ziha (Hewitson, 1865) – white-spotted hairstreak Himalayas
- Euaspa milionia (Hewitson, 1869) – water hairstreak
- Euaspa forsteri (Esaki & Shirôzu, 1943) Taiwan and (E. f. ueharai) Laos
- Euaspa tayal (Esaki & Shirôzu, 1943) Taiwan
- Euaspa pavo (de Nicéville, 1887) – peacock hairstreak North India, Bhutan, Assam, Laos, Myanmar
- Euaspa hishikawai Koiwaya, 2002 Laos
- Euaspa mikamii Koiwaya, 2002 Northeast India
- Euaspa minaei Monastryskii & Devyatkin, 2003 Vietnam
- Euaspa miyashitai Koiwaya, 2002 Northeast India
- Euaspa motokii Koiwaya, 2002 Myanmar
- Euaspa nishimurai Koiwaya, 2002 Vietnam
- Euaspa nosei Koiwaya, 2002 Myanmar
- Euaspa uedai Koiwaya, 2014 China (Sichuan)
- Euaspa zhengi Huang, 2016 China (Xizang Autonomous Region)
