= Elkalyce =

Scientific classification
- Domain: Eukaryota
- Kingdom: Animalia
- Phylum: Arthropoda
- Class: Insecta
- Order: Lepidoptera
- Family: Lycaenidae
- Subfamily: Polyommatinae
- Tribe: Polyommatini
- Genus: Elkalyce; Bálint & Johnson, [1996]

Species
- Elkalyce cogina Elkalyce diporides Elkalyce kala

Butterfly genus in family Lycaenidae

Elkalyce is a genus of butterflies in the family Lycaenidae.The genus is monotypic containing the single species Elkalyce cogina (Schaus, 1902) endemic to Brazil.

Elkalyce cogina, the only species in the genus, does not belong to the sub-tribe Lycaenopsina and actually belongs to the sub-tribe Everina (Freitas et al., 2016). The species Elkalyce cogina originates in Asia (Freitas et al., 2016). The larvae of Elkalyce cogina feeds on fabaceae (Freitas et al., 2016).
