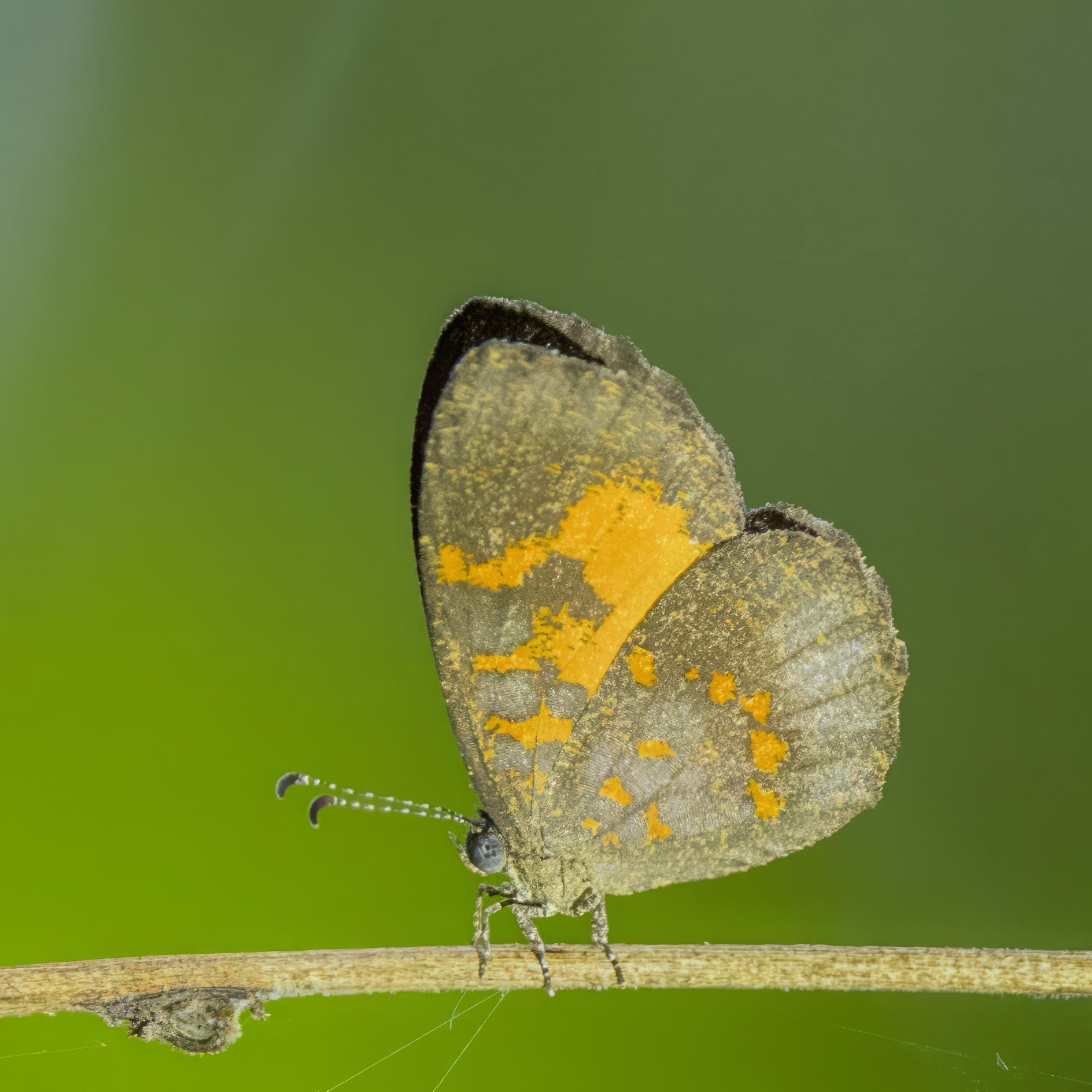
- in Ghana

Scientific classification
- Kingdom: Animalia
- Phylum: Arthropoda
- Clade: Pancrustacea
- Class: Insecta
- Order: Lepidoptera
- Family: Lycaenidae
- Subfamily: Poritiinae
- Tribe: Liptenini
- Genus: Eresiomera; Clench, 1965

= Eresiomera =

Butterfly genus in family Lycaenidae

Eresiomera is a genus of butterflies in the family Lycaenidae. It is sometimes treated as a synonym of Pseuderesia.

== Species ==
- Eresiomera bicolor (Grose-Smith & Kirby, 1890)
- Eresiomera campbelli Collins & Larsen, 1998
- Eresiomera clenchi (Stempffer, 1961)
- Eresiomera cornesi (Stempffer, 1969)
- Eresiomera cornucopiae (Holland, 1892)
- Eresiomera isca (Hewitson, 1873)
- Eresiomera jacksoni (Stempffer, 1969)
- Eresiomera kiellandi Larsen, 1998
- Eresiomera magnimacula (Rebel, 1914)
- Eresiomera mapongwa (Holland, 1893)
- Eresiomera nancy Collins & Larsen, 1998
- Eresiomera nigeriana (Stempffer, 1962)
- Eresiomera osheba (Holland, 1890)
- Eresiomera ouesso (Stempffer, 1962)
- Eresiomera paradoxa (Schultze, 1917)
- Eresiomera petersi (Stempffer & Bennett, 1956)
- Eresiomera phaeochiton (Grünberg, 1910)
- Eresiomera phillipi Collins & Larsen, 1998
- Eresiomera rougeoti (Stempffer, 1961)
- Eresiomera rutilo (Druce, 1910)
