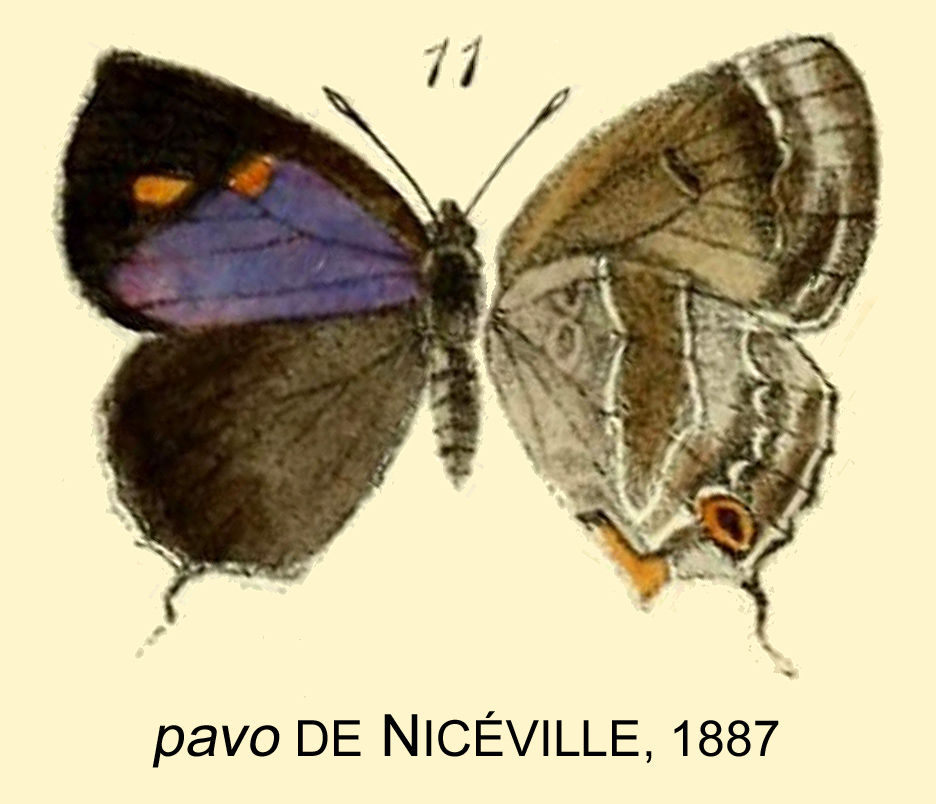
- Euaspa pavo

Scientific classification
- Kingdom: Animalia
- Phylum: Arthropoda
- Clade: Pancrustacea
- Class: Insecta
- Order: Lepidoptera
- Family: Lycaenidae
- Genus: Euaspa
- Species: E. pavo

Binomial name
- Euaspa pavo (de Nicéville, 1887)

= Euaspa pavo =

Peacock hairstreak

Species of butterfly

Euaspa pavo, the peacock hairstreak, is a small butterfly found in India that belongs to the lycaenids or blues family.

== Range ==
The butterfly occurs in Indian Himalayas from Bhutan to Nagaland.

== See also ==
- List of butterflies of India (Lycaenidae)
