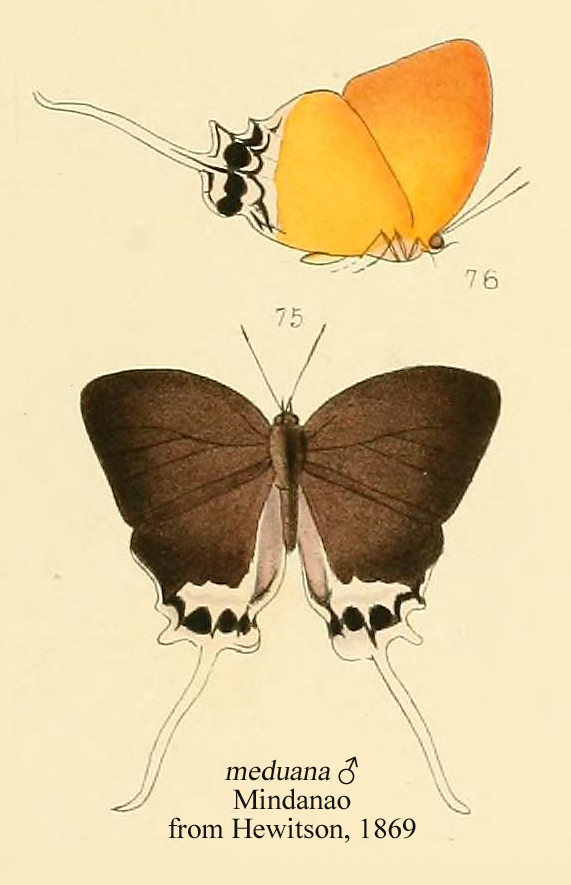
- Eooxylides meduana

Scientific classification
- Domain: Eukaryota
- Kingdom: Animalia
- Phylum: Arthropoda
- Class: Insecta
- Order: Lepidoptera
- Family: Lycaenidae
- Tribe: Theclini
- Genus: Eooxylides; Doherty,1889

= Eooxylides =

Butterfly genus in family Lycaenidae

Eooxylides is a genus of butterflies in the family Lycaenidae. The species in this genus are found in the Indomalayan realm.

== Species ==
- Eooxylides tharis (Geyer, [1837])
- Eooxylides etias (Distant & Pryer, 1887)
- Eooxylides meduana (Hewitson, 1869)
