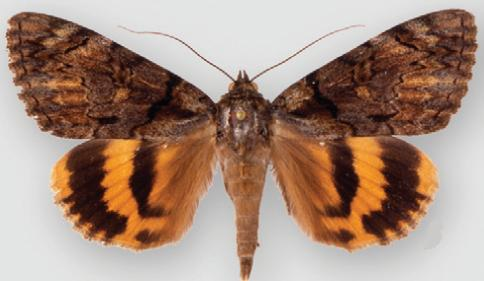
- Typical imago from above

Scientific classification
- Kingdom: Animalia
- Phylum: Arthropoda
- Clade: Pancrustacea
- Class: Insecta
- Order: Lepidoptera
- Superfamily: Noctuoidea
- Family: Erebidae
- Genus: Catocala
- Species: C. delilah

Binomial name
- Catocala delilah Strecker, 1874

Synonyms
- Catocala adoptiva Grote, 1874; Catocala calphurnia H.Edwards, 1880; Catocala delilah f. umbella Barnes & Benjamin, 1927

= Catocala delilah =

Delilah underwing

Species of moth

Catocala delilah, the Delilah underwing, is a moth in the family Erebidae. The species was first described by Strecker in 1874. It is found in the southern and midwestern United States, from Ohio south to Florida and west to Texas and Oklahoma.

== Description and ecology ==
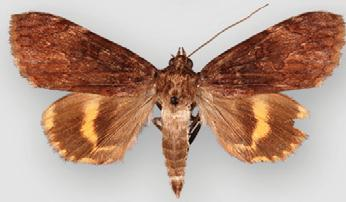
Imago of the calphurnia form from above

The wingspan is 60–65 mm. The forewings are grayish brown above, with a clearly marked irregular black line running from the leading to the trailing edge both inwards and outwards of each wing's center. The upperside of the hindwings is mainly yellowish orange, with a few dark hairs at the base and a blackish pattern. The latter usually forms two roughly concentric bands, an inner one curving through the mid-wing from the leading to the trailing edge, and an outer one that almost reaches the termen. The apex is outside the outer band and forms a large bright orange-yellow spot; likewise, the outer band does not reach the tornus, which bears a separate black spot. The termen has faint dark bands along the wing veins. The underside of the wings is yellow with black bands. Some forms with aberrant pattern are known. As in many relatives, the foreleg tibia of this species possess no spines, while the tarsi carry three rows of spines.

Adults are on the wing from May to June depending on the location. There is probably one generation per year. The caterpillars feed on such plants as bur oak (Quercus macrocarpa), Gambel oak (Q. gambeli), and willows (Salix).

== Classification ==
This moth is placed in the subfamily Catocalinae, either of the owlet moth family, Noctuidae, or – if the Noctuidae are circumscribed more strictly – of family Erebidae. Within the Catocalinae, it belongs to tribe Catocalini and – if the Noctuidae are circumscribed widely – subtribe Catocalina.

C. delilah is the best-known member of a cryptic species complex, some species of which have only recently been described. Additionally, the former subspecies C. d. desdemona (Desdemona underwing), which occurs west of the Delilah underwing from Arizona and Utah south through Mexico to Honduras, is now again considered to be a valid species C. desdemona. This also includes the supposed subspecies C. d. utahensis, the supposed species C. ixion, and the forms swetti and umbra.
