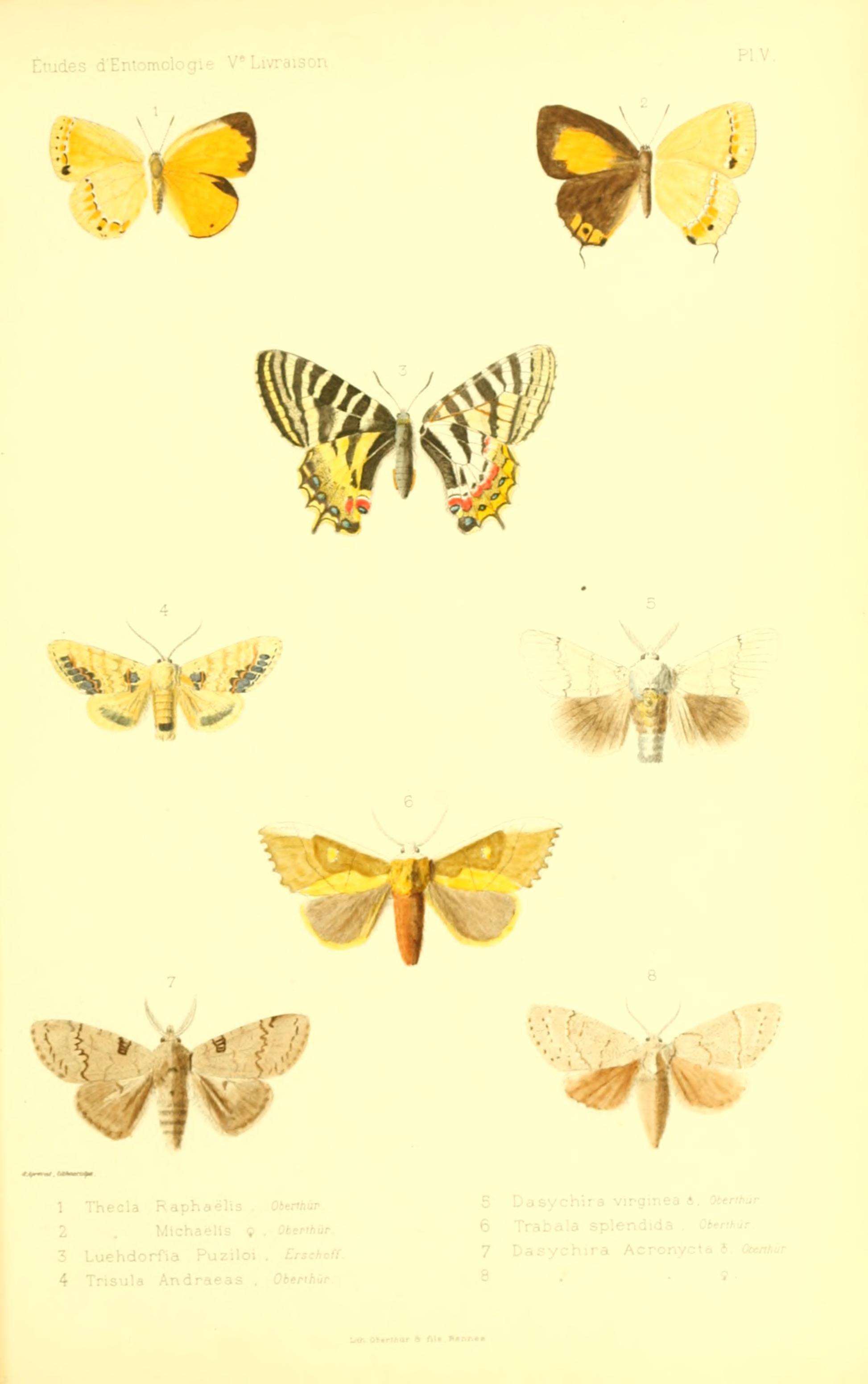
- Figure 2

Scientific classification
- Domain: Eukaryota
- Kingdom: Animalia
- Phylum: Arthropoda
- Class: Insecta
- Order: Lepidoptera
- Family: Lycaenidae
- Subfamily: Theclinae
- Tribe: Theclini
- Genus: Ussuriana
- Species: U. michaelis

Binomial name
- Ussuriana michaelis (Oberthür, 1881)

Synonyms
- Thecla michaelis Oberthür, 1880; Zephyrus michaelis var. gabrielis Leech, 1894

= Ussuriana michaelis =

Species of butterfly

Ussuriana michaelis is a butterfly of the family Lycaenidae. It was described by Charles Oberthür in 1881. It is found in the Russian Far East (Primorye), China, Korea and Taiwan.

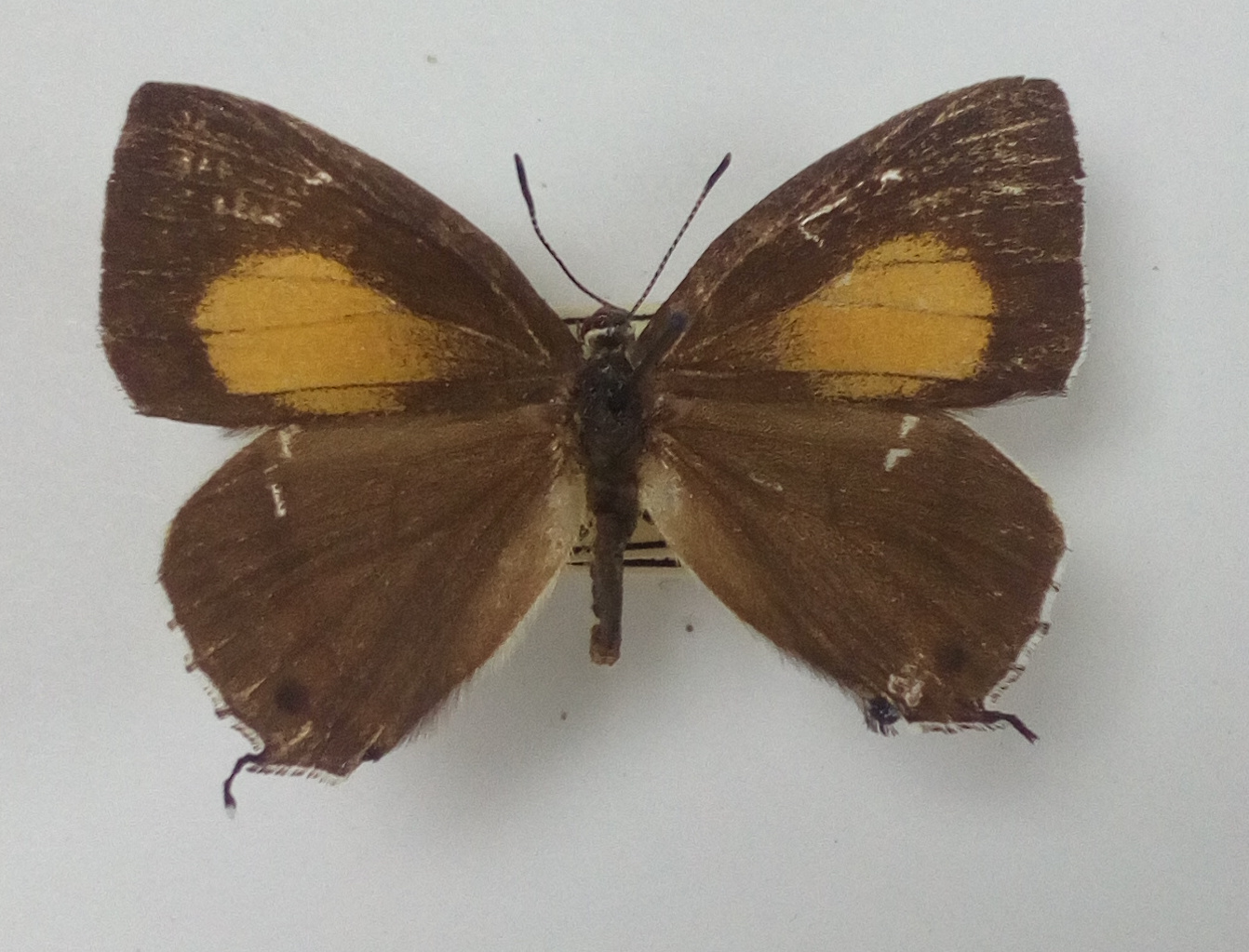
Ussuriana michaelis michaelis specimen.Primorsky Krai

== Subspecies ==
- Ussuriana michaelis michaelis
- Ussuriana michaelis gabrielis (Leech, 1894)
- Ussuriana michaelis kham N. Nakamura & Wakahara, 2001 (Laos)
- Ussuriana michaelis okamensis Fujioka, 1992 (China: Kwang-tong)
- Ussuriana michaelis secunda Fujioka, 1992 (China: Szechuan)
