= List of lycaenid genera: W =

The large butterfly family Lycaenidae contains the following genera starting with the letter W:

- Wagimo
