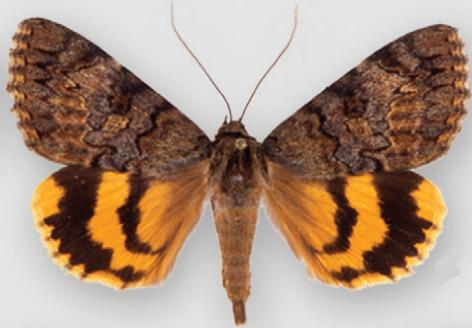

Scientific classification
- Kingdom: Animalia
- Phylum: Arthropoda
- Class: Insecta
- Order: Lepidoptera
- Superfamily: Noctuoidea
- Family: Erebidae
- Genus: Catocala
- Species: C. desdemona

Binomial name
- Catocala desdemona H. Edwards, 1882

Synonyms
- Catocala umbra Barnes & Benjamin, 1927; Ephesia desdemona; Catocala delilah desdemona; Catocala utahensis Cassino, 1918; Catocala ixion Druce, 1890; Catocala swetti Barnes & Benjamin, 1927

= Catocala desdemona =

Desdemona underwing

Species of moth

Catocala desdemona, the Desdemona underwing, is a moth of the family Erebidae. The species was first described by Henry Edwards in 1882. It is found in Utah and Arizona, ranging south into New Mexico and Texas, and onwards through Mexico up to Honduras.

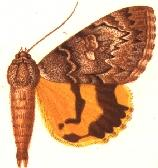
Illustration

It was formerly considered to be a subspecies of Catocala delilah.

The wingspan is 60–65 mm. Adults are on wing from May to June depending on the location. There is probably one generation per year.

The larvae feed on Quercus gambeli, Quercus macrocarpus and Salix.
