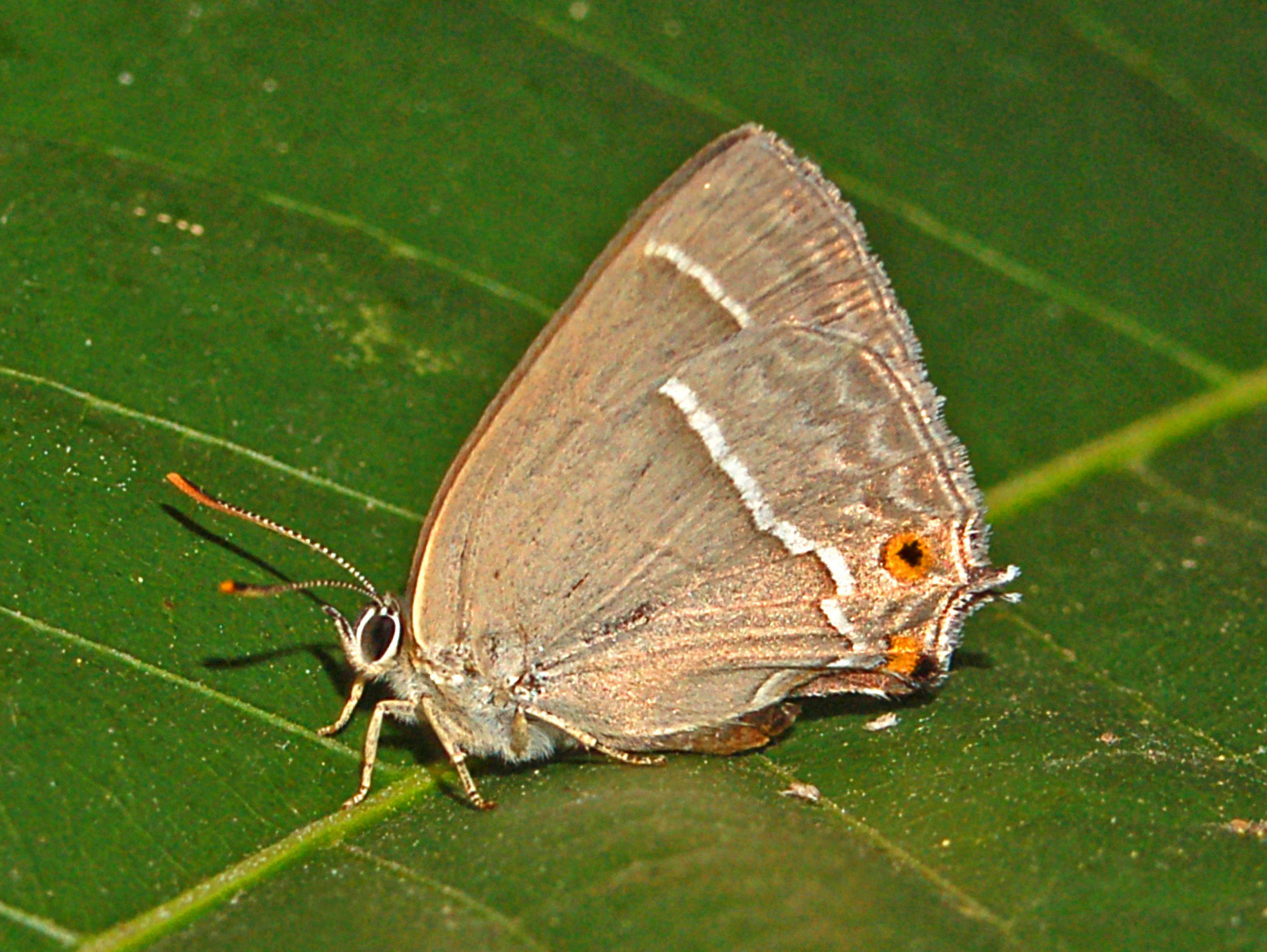
- Neozephyrus quercus

Scientific classification
- Domain: Eukaryota
- Kingdom: Animalia
- Phylum: Arthropoda
- Class: Insecta
- Order: Lepidoptera
- Family: Lycaenidae
- Tribe: Theclini
- Genus: Neozephyrus; Sibatani & Ito, 1942

= Neozephyrus =

Butterfly genus in family Lycaenidae

Neozephyrus is a genus of butterflies in the family Lycaenidae. Species in this genus are mainly distributed in East Asia. The larval food plant is alder or - for Neozephyrus quercus - oak .

== List of species ==
- Neozephyrus coruscans (Leech, 1894) western and central China
- Neozephyrus dubernardi (Riley, 1939) Yunnan
- Neozephyrus helenae Howarth, 1957 China
- Neozephyrus japonicus (Murray, 1875) Amur Oblast, Ussuri, northeast China, Korea, Japan, Taiwan
- Neozephyrus quercus (Linnaeus, 1758) - purple hairstreak
- Neozephyrus taiwanus (Wileman, 1908) Taiwan
- Neozephyrus uedai Koiwaya, 2003 Burma
- Neozephyrus asahii Fujioka, 2003 China (Kouy Tcheou)

== See also ==
- Chrysozephyrus
- Favonius
