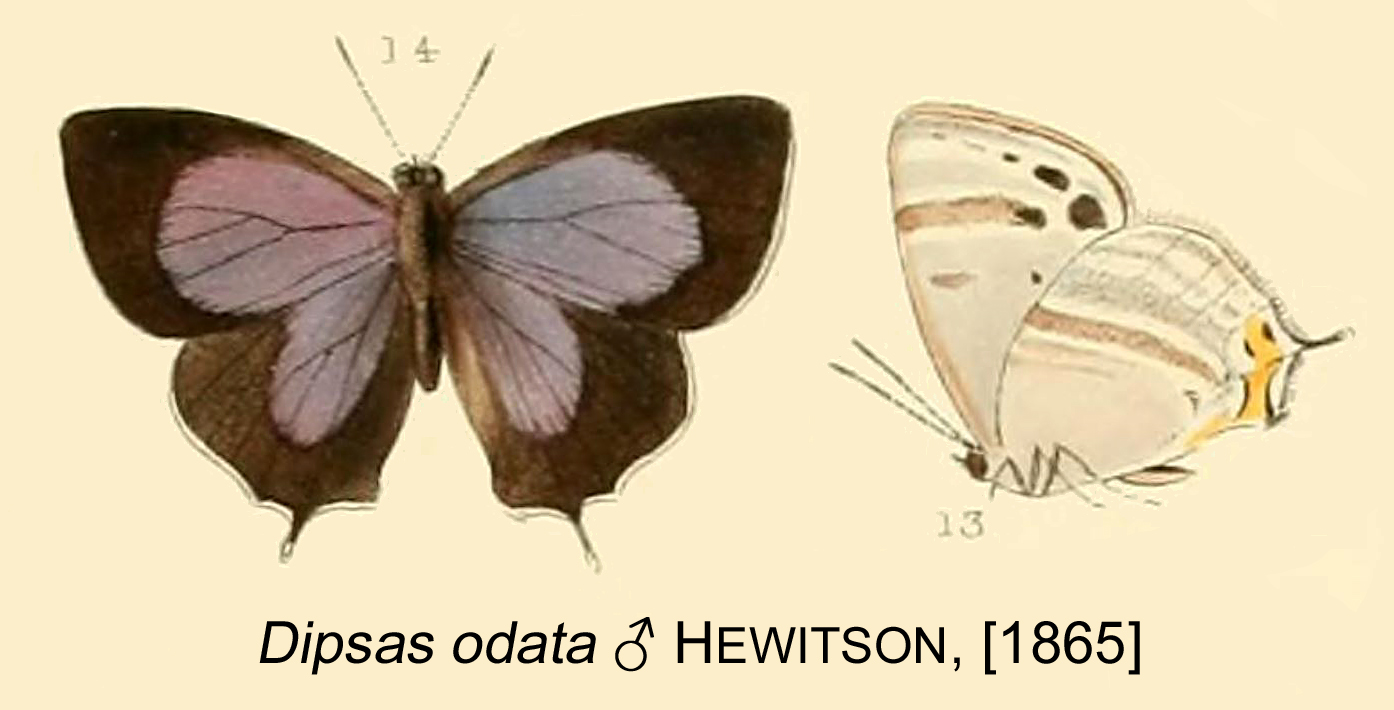
- Chaetoprocta odata

Scientific classification
- Domain: Eukaryota
- Kingdom: Animalia
- Phylum: Arthropoda
- Class: Insecta
- Order: Lepidoptera
- Family: Lycaenidae
- Tribe: Theclini
- Genus: Chaetoprocta de Nicéville, 1890

= Chaetoprocta =

Butterfly genus in family Lycaenidae

Chaetoprocta is a genus of butterflies in the family Lycaenidae.

== Species ==
Listed alphabetically:

- Chaetoprocta baileyi Forster, 1980 Nepal
- Chaetoprocta kurumi Fujioka, 1970 Nepal
- Chaetoprocta odata (Hewitson, 1865)
