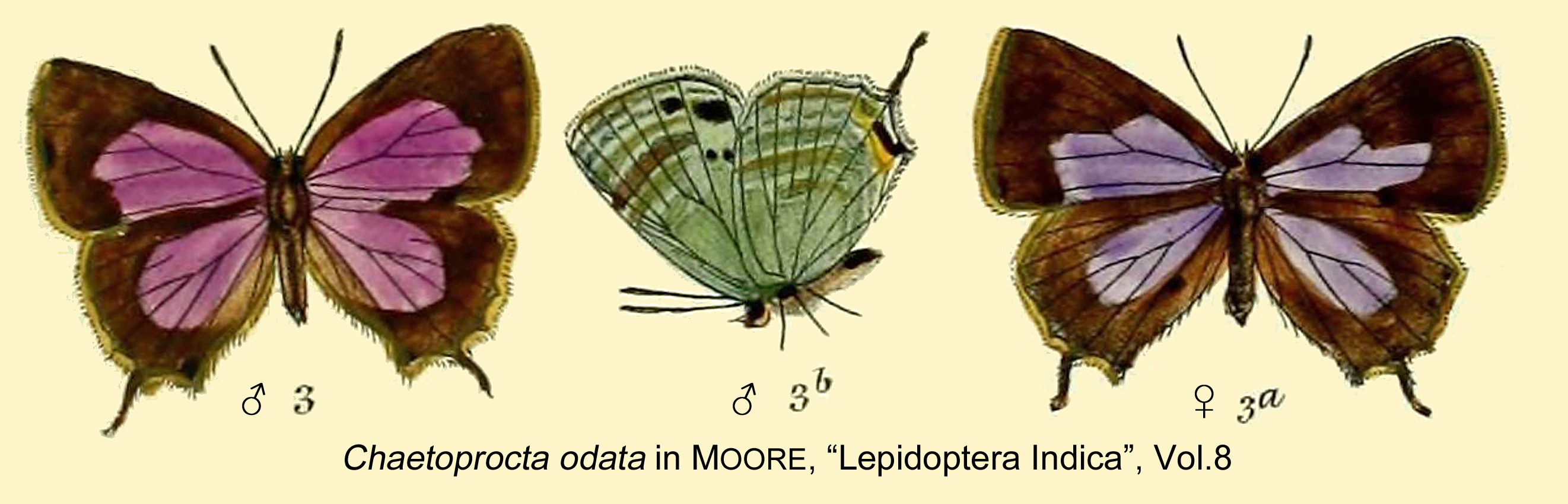
- Chaetoprocta odata in Moore Lepidoptera Indica

Scientific classification
- Kingdom: Animalia
- Phylum: Arthropoda
- Class: Insecta
- Order: Lepidoptera
- Family: Lycaenidae
- Genus: Chaetoprocta
- Species: C. odata

Binomial name
- Chaetoprocta odata (Hewitson 1865)

Synonyms
- Dipsas odata Hewitson, 1865

= Chaetoprocta odata =

Walnut blue

Species of butterfly

Chaetoprocta odata, the walnut blue, is a small butterfly found in India (Northwest India to Sikkim) and Afghanistan that belongs to the lycaenids or blues family.

== See also ==
- List of butterflies of India
- List of butterflies of India (Lycaenidae)
