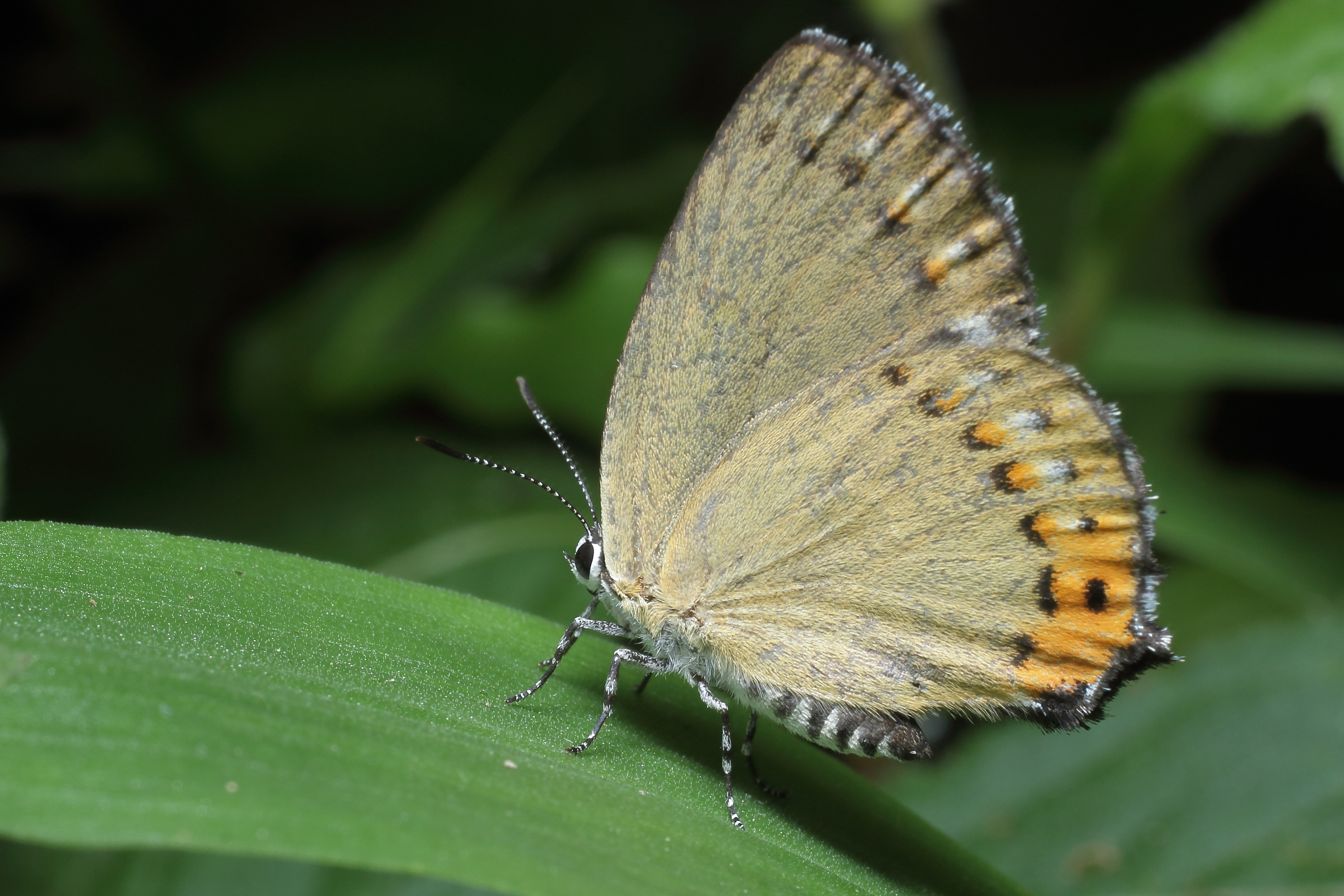
- Ussuriana stygiana

Scientific classification
- Domain: Eukaryota
- Kingdom: Animalia
- Phylum: Arthropoda
- Class: Insecta
- Order: Lepidoptera
- Family: Lycaenidae
- Subfamily: Theclinae
- Tribe: Theclini
- Genus: Ussuriana; Tutt, 1907

= Ussuriana =

Genus of butterflies

Ussuriana is a genus of hairstreaks in the butterfly family Lycaenidae. There are at least four described species in Ussuriana, found in the eastern Palearctic.

== Species ==
These four species belong to the genus Ussuriana, although the genus classification of Ussuriana igarashii has been questioned.

- Ussuriana fani Koiwaya, 1993 – China
  - Ussuriana fani zihaoi Huang, 2016 – China
- Ussuriana michaelis (Oberthür, 1881) – eastern Asia
- Ussuriana stygiana (Butler, 1881) – Japan
- Ussuriana igarashii Wang & Owada, 2009 – China
