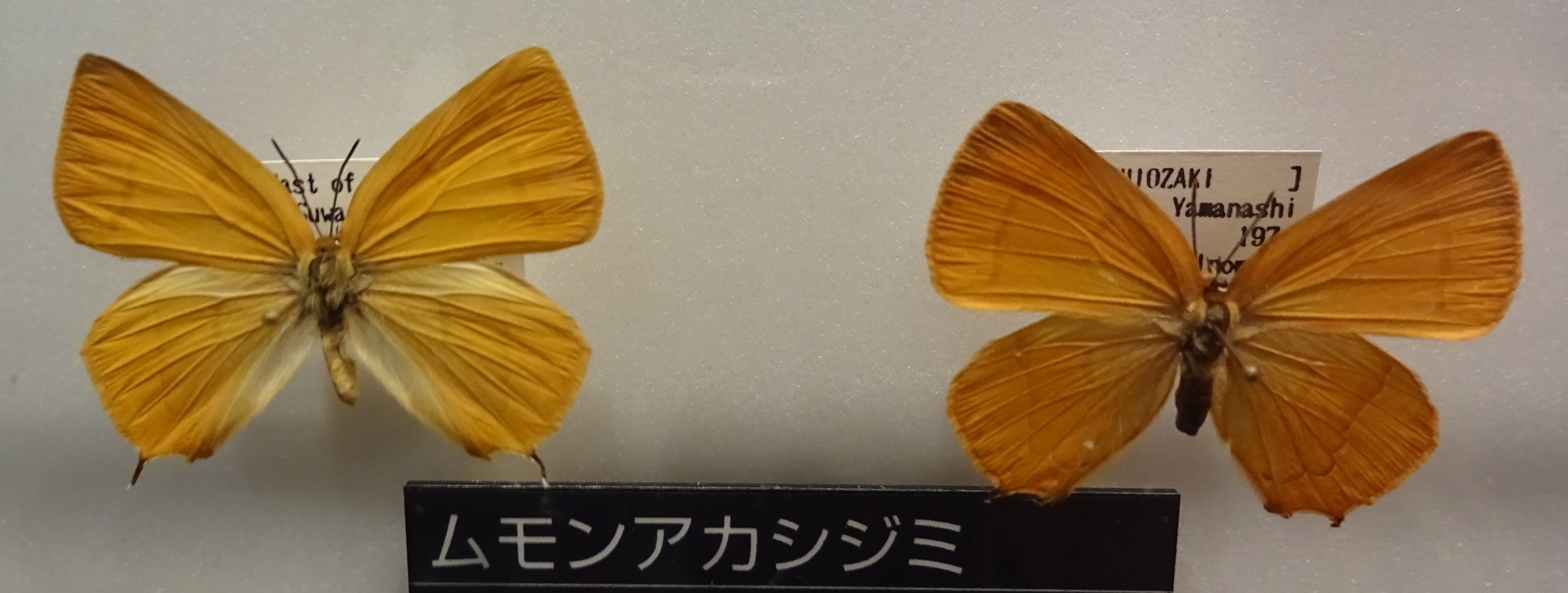
- Shirozua jonasi

Scientific classification
- Domain: Eukaryota
- Kingdom: Animalia
- Phylum: Arthropoda
- Class: Insecta
- Order: Lepidoptera
- Family: Lycaenidae
- Tribe: Theclini
- Genus: Shirozua; Sibatani & Ito, 1942

= Shirozua =

Butterfly genus in family Lycaenidae

Shirozua is a genus of butterflies in the family Lycaenidae.

== Species ==
- Shirozua jonasi (Janson, 1877) Amur Oblast, Ussuri, northeastern China, Korea, Japan
- Shirozua melpomene (Leech, 1890) western China
