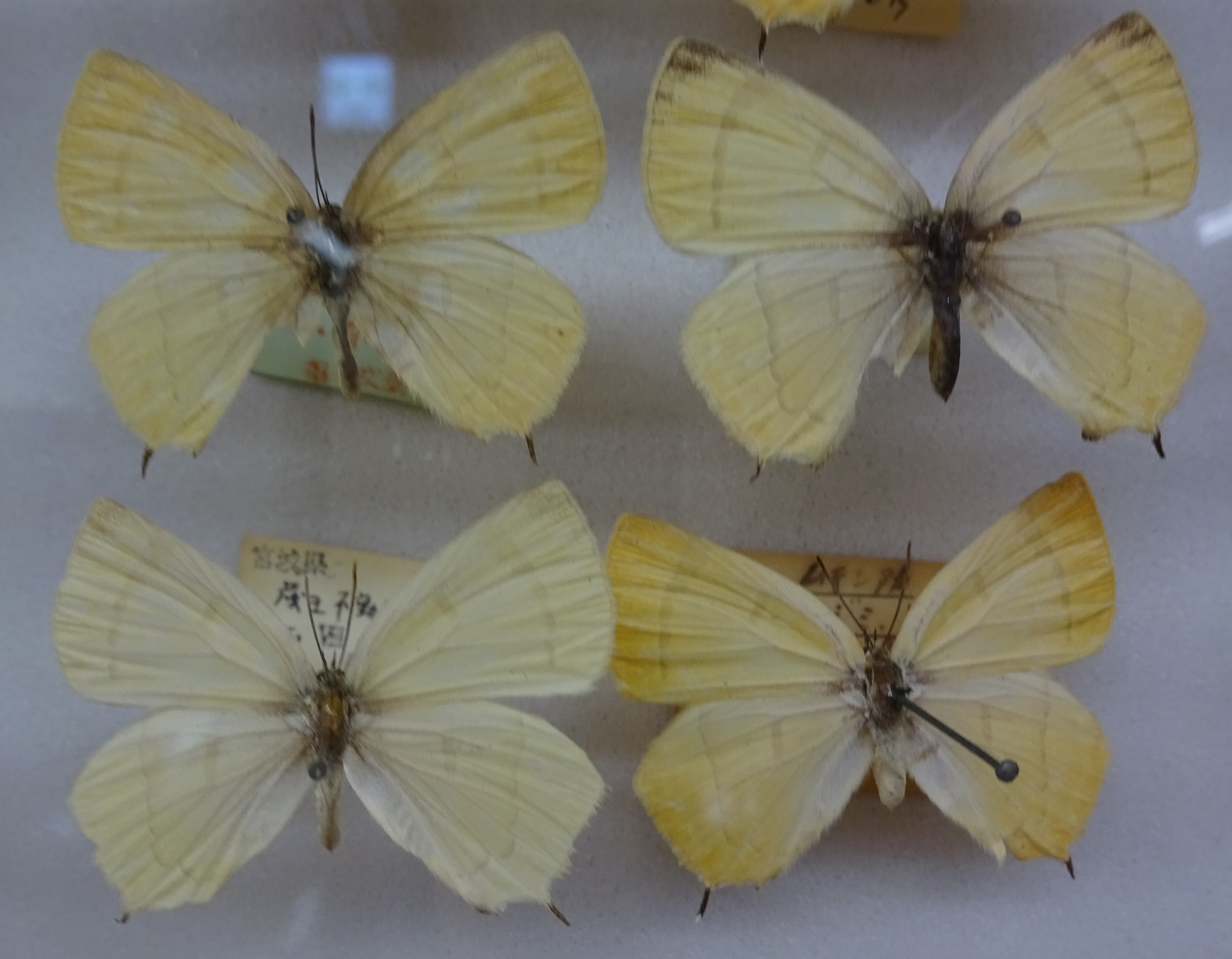

Scientific classification
- Kingdom: Animalia
- Phylum: Arthropoda
- Clade: Pancrustacea
- Class: Insecta
- Order: Lepidoptera
- Family: Lycaenidae
- Genus: Shirozua
- Species: S. jonasi

Binomial name
- Shirozua jonasi (Janson, 1877)

Synonyms
- Thecla jonasi Janson, 1877

= Shirozua jonasi =

Species of butterfly

Shirozua jonasi, the orange hairstreak, is a butterfly of the subfamily Lycaeninae. It was described by Edward Wesley Janson in 1877. It is found in the Russian Far East (Amur, Ussuri), north-eastern China, Korea and Japan. It is widely distributed in the forest belt.

Above the butterfly is uniformly orange yellow, with only the extreme apex and the tail black. The white discal line is single, and proximally shaded with dark; the discocellular line is likewise dark and single.

Seitz "Z. jonasi Jans. Above uniformly orange-yellow, only the extreme apex and the tail black. Beneath similar to Japonica lutea (Hewitson, 1865), but the white discal line not double, but single, being proximally shaded with dark; the discocellular line likewise dark and single. — In the north of China and Japan; apparently not plentiful, flying about young trees in August."

Adults are on wing from mid-July to the end of August.

The larvae feed on Quercus variabilis, Quercus dentata, Quercus acutissima, Quercus serrata, Castanea crenata, Quercus mongolica, Lachrus tropicalis and Kermes miyasaleii.

== Subspecies ==
- Shirozua jonasi jonasi
- Shirozua jonasi sichuanensis Sugiyama, 2004 (China: Sichuan)
