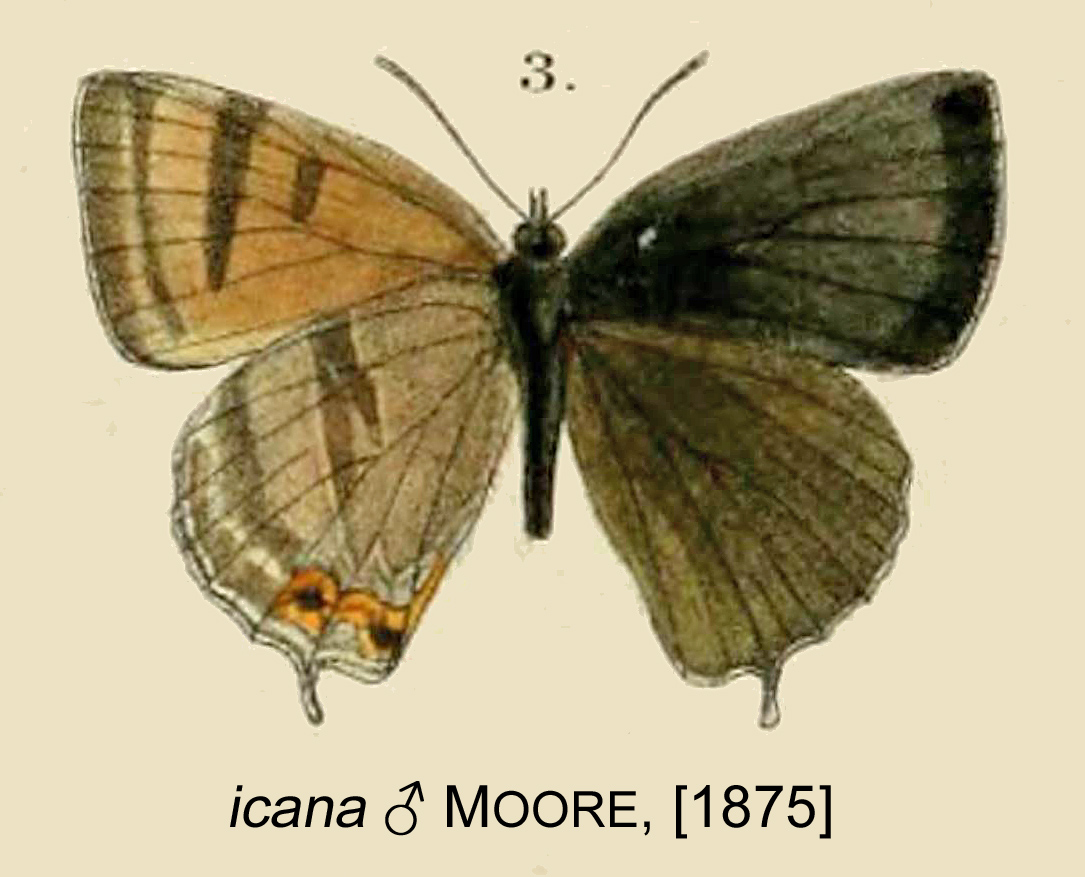

Scientific classification
- Domain: Eukaryota
- Kingdom: Animalia
- Phylum: Arthropoda
- Class: Insecta
- Order: Lepidoptera
- Family: Lycaenidae
- Genus: Esakiozephyrus
- Species: E. icana

Binomial name
- Esakiozephyrus icana (Moore, 1874)

= Esakiozephyrus icana =

Dull green hairstreak

Species of butterfly

Esakiozephyrus icana, the dull green hairstreak, is a small butterfly found in India that belongs to the lycaenids or blues (family Lycaenidae). The species was first described by Frederic Moore in 1874.

The butterfly was classified as Thecla icana Moore.

The butterfly occurs in India in the western Himalayas from Kullu to Garhwal, Nepal, Sikkim to Bhutan and Myanmar. The butterfly also occurs in Tibet, Sichuan and Yunnan.

== See also ==
- Lycaenidae
- List of butterflies of India (Lycaenidae)
