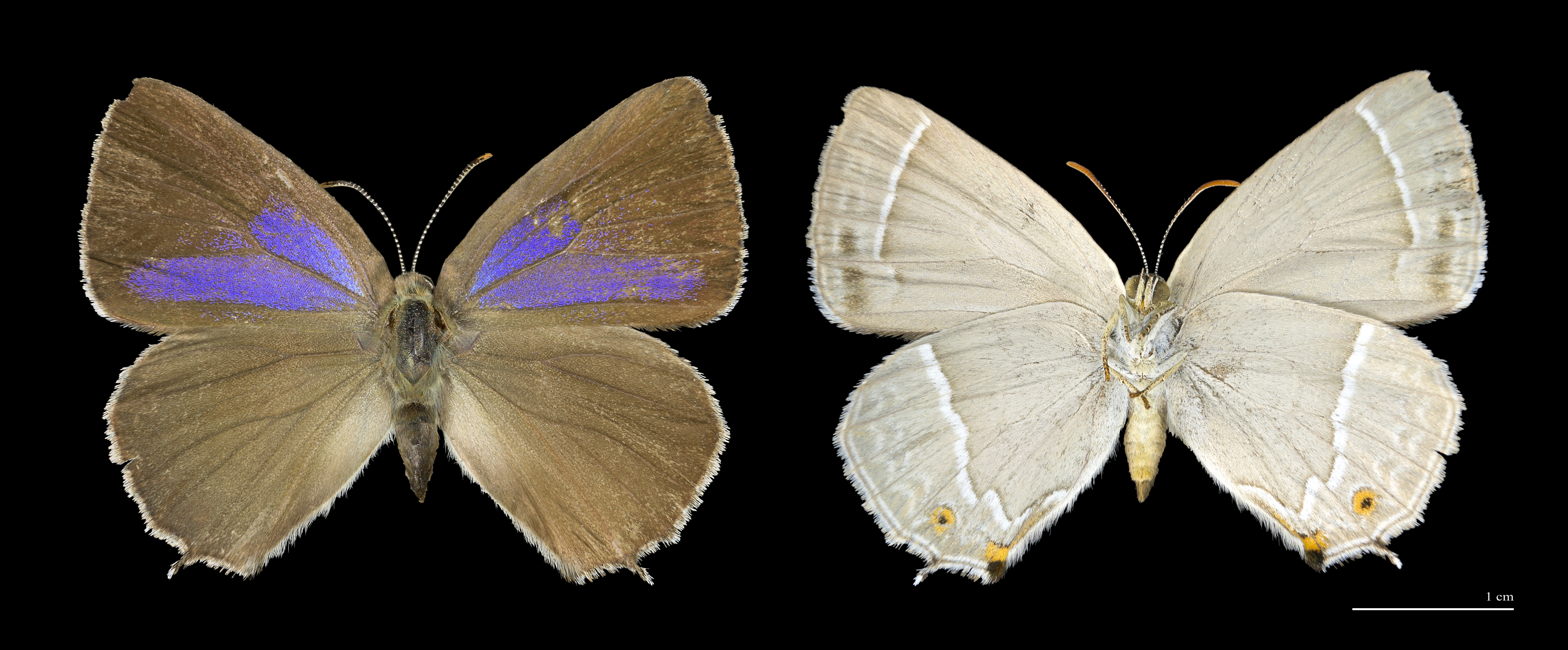
- Female purple hairstreak (Neozephyrus quercus)

Scientific classification
- Kingdom: Animalia
- Phylum: Arthropoda
- Clade: Pancrustacea
- Class: Insecta
- Order: Lepidoptera
- Family: Lycaenidae
- Subfamily: Theclinae
- Tribe: Theclini; Swainson, 1830

Genera
- About 40, see text

= Theclini =

Tribe of butterflies

The Theclini are a tribe of butterflies in the family Lycaenidae. As not all Theclinae have been assigned to tribes, the genus list is preliminary.

== Genera ==
- Amblopala
- Antigius
- Araragi
- Artopoetes
- Austrozephyrus
- Chaetoprocta
- Chrysozephyrus
- Cordelia
- Coreana
- Esakiozephyrus
- Euaspa
- Favonius - includes Quercusia
- Goldia
- Gonerilia
- Habrodais
- Howarthia
- Hypaurotis
- Iozephyrus
- Iratsume
- Japonica
- Laeosopis
- Leucantigius
- Nanlingozephyrus
- Neozephyrus
- Protantigius
- Proteuaspa
- Quercusia
- Ravenna
- Saigusaozephyrus
- Shaanxiana
- Shirozua
- Shizuyaozephyrus
- Sibataniozephyrus
- Teratozephyrus
- Thecla
- Thermozephyrus
- Ussuriana
- Wagimo
- Yamamotozephyrus
- Yamatozephyrus
