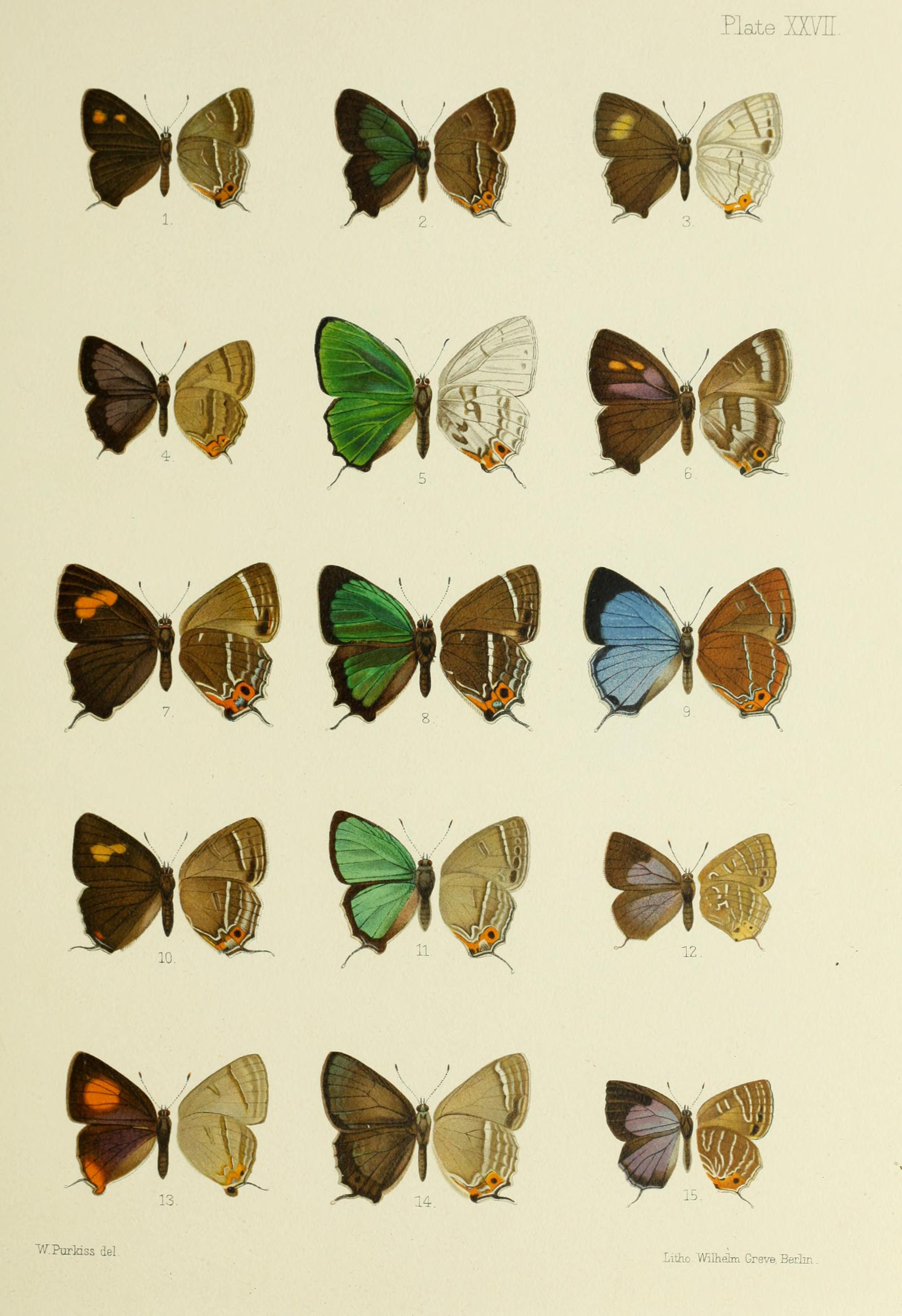
- Esakiozephyrus hecale and Zephyrus icana in Leech Butterflies from China, Japan, and Corea (hecale1 female, 2 male and icana 4 male )

Scientific classification
- Kingdom: Animalia
- Phylum: Arthropoda
- Clade: Pancrustacea
- Class: Insecta
- Order: Lepidoptera
- Family: Lycaenidae
- Tribe: Theclini
- Genus: Esakiozephyrus; Shirôzu & Yamamoto, 1956

= Esakiozephyrus =

Butterfly genus in family Lycaenidae

Esakiozephyrus is a genus of butterflies in the family Lycaenidae. Esakiozephyrus species are found in the Western Himalayan broadleaf forests, and in similar habitats in Burma, Tibet and Nepal.

== Species ==
- Esakiozephyrus icana (Moore, [1875]) – dull green hairstreak
- Esakiozephyrus camurius (Murayama, 1986)
- Esakiozephyrus vallonia (Oberthür, 1914)
- Esakiozephyrus neis (Oberthür, 1914)
- Esakiozephyrus tsangkie (Oberthür, 1886)
- Esakiozephyrus zotelistes (Oberthür, 1914)
- Esakiozephyrus zhengi Huang, 1998
