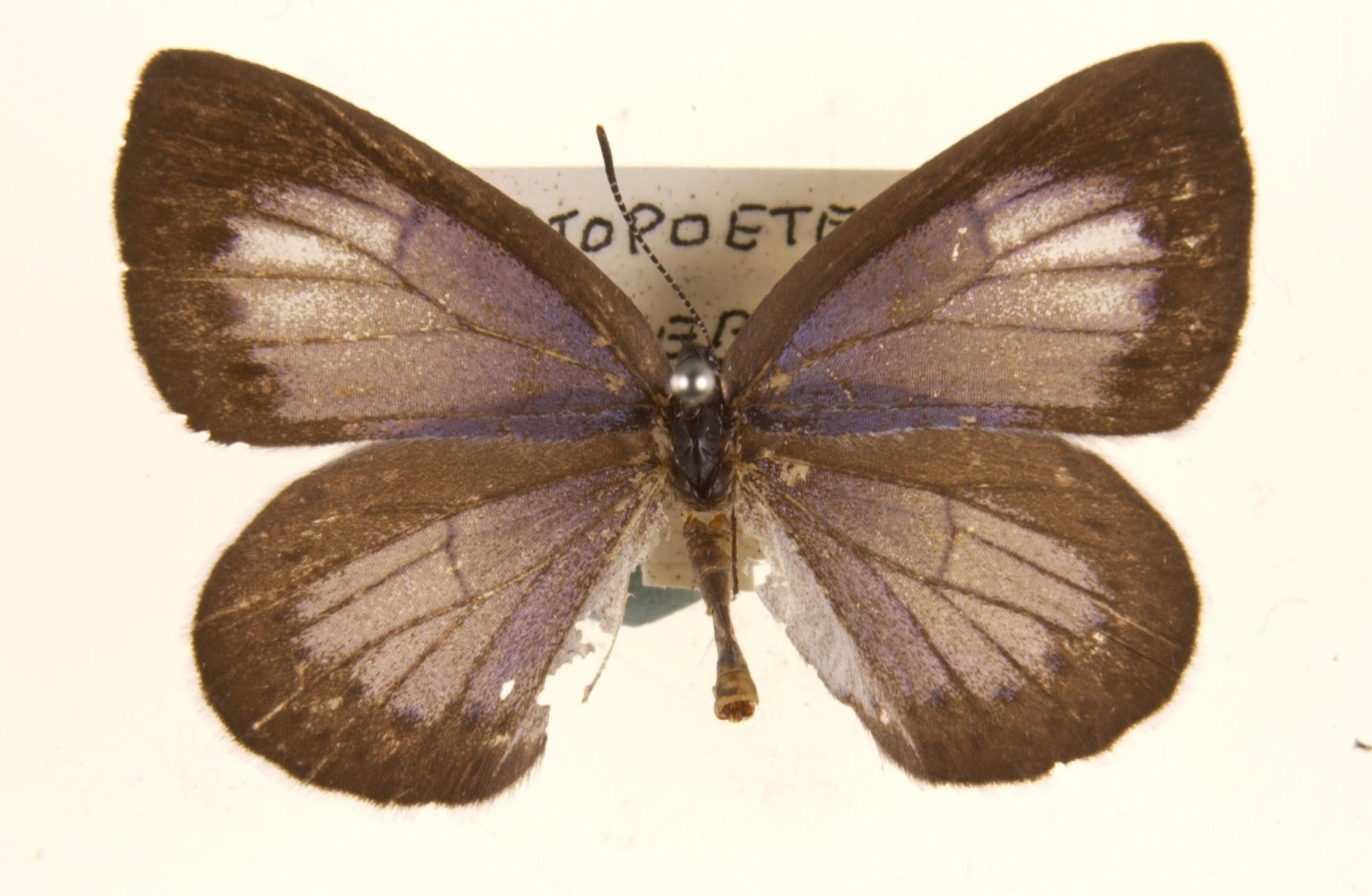
- Artopoetes pryeri from Japan

Scientific classification
- Domain: Eukaryota
- Kingdom: Animalia
- Phylum: Arthropoda
- Class: Insecta
- Order: Lepidoptera
- Family: Lycaenidae
- Tribe: Theclini
- Genus: Artopoetes; Chapman, 1909

= Artopoetes =

Butterfly genus in family Lycaenidae

Artopoetes is a genus of butterflies in the family Lycaenidae. It is a small east Asian genus of tailless hairstreaks.

== Species ==
- Artopoetes praetextatus (Fujioka, 1992)
- Artopoetes pryeri (Murray, 1873) northeast China, southern Amur, Ussuri, Korea, Japan (Honshu, Hokkaido)
