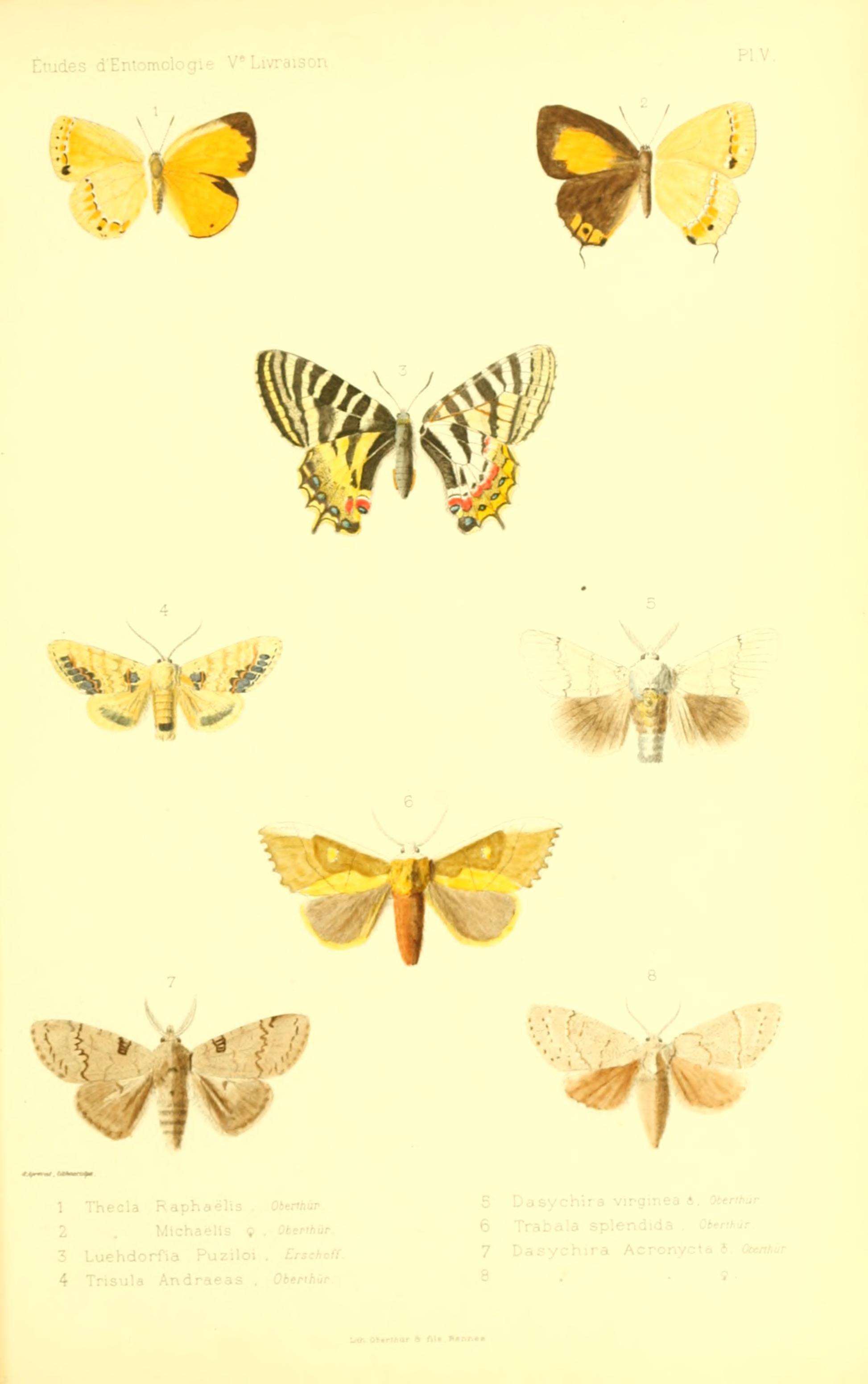
- In Charles Oberthür's 1880 Faune des Lépidoptères de l'ile Askold

Scientific classification
- Domain: Eukaryota
- Kingdom: Animalia
- Phylum: Arthropoda
- Class: Insecta
- Order: Lepidoptera
- Family: Lycaenidae
- Tribe: Theclini
- Genus: Coreana; Tutt, 1907
- Species: C. raphaelis

Binomial name
- Coreana raphaelis (Oberthür, 1880)

= Coreana =

Butterfly genus in family Lycaenidae

Coreana is a butterfly genus in the family Lycaenidae. The genus is monotypic, containing the single species Coreana raphaelis, which is found in the east Palearctic in Ussuri, north-east China, Korea and Japan (Honshu).

The larva feeds on Fraxinus species (F. rhyncophylia, F. japonica, F. lanuginosa and F. mandshurica).

== Subspecies ==
- C. r. flamen (Leech, 1887) Korea
- C. r. yamamotoi Okano, 1953 Japan
- C. r. ohruii Shirôzu, 1962 Japan
