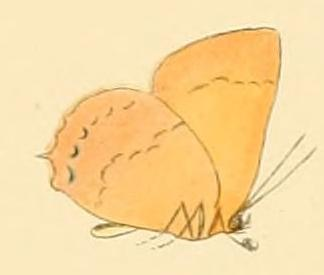

Scientific classification
- Domain: Eukaryota
- Kingdom: Animalia
- Phylum: Arthropoda
- Class: Insecta
- Order: Lepidoptera
- Family: Lycaenidae
- Tribe: Theclini
- Genus: Habrodais; Scudder, 1876

= Habrodais =

Butterfly genus in family Lycaenidae

Habrodais is a Nearctic genus of butterflies in the family Lycaenidae.

== Species ==
- Habrodais grunus (Boisduval, 1852)
- Habrodais poodiae Brown & Faulkner, 1982
