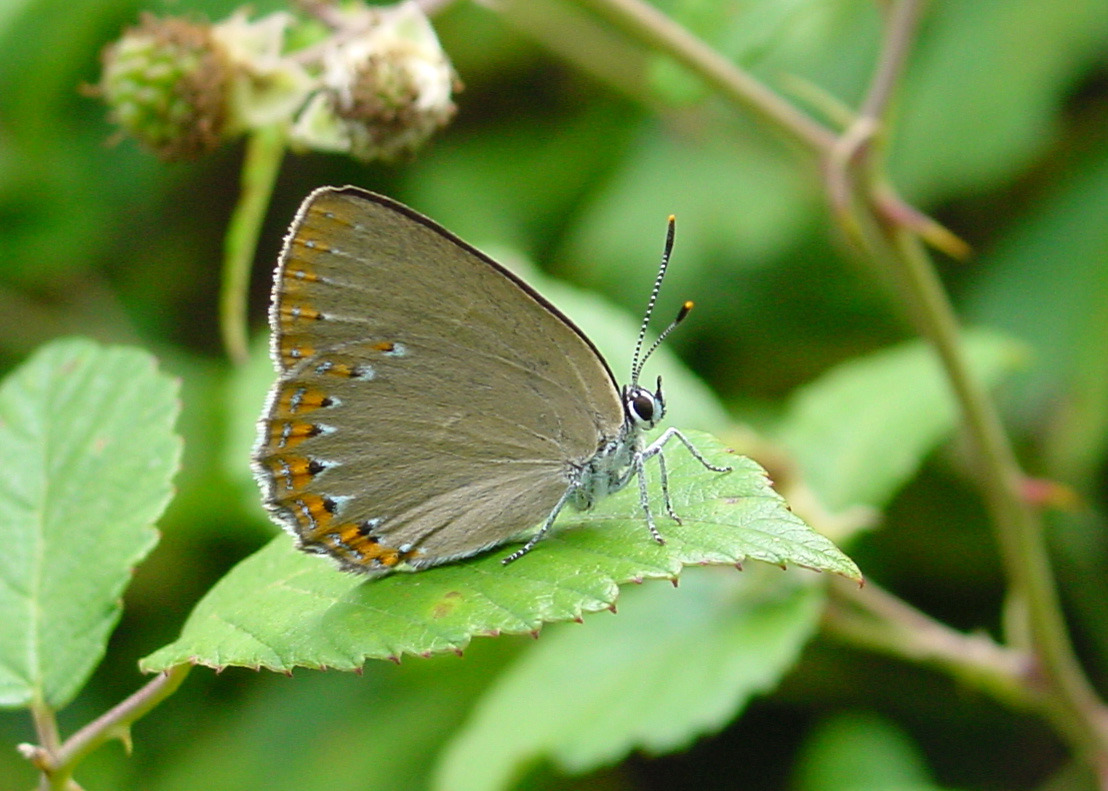

Conservation status
- Least Concern (IUCN 3.1)

Scientific classification
- Kingdom: Animalia
- Phylum: Arthropoda
- Class: Insecta
- Order: Lepidoptera
- Family: Lycaenidae
- Tribe: Theclini
- Genus: Laeosopis; Rambur, 1858
- Species: L. roboris

Binomial name
- Laeosopis roboris Esper, 1789

= Laeosopis =

Monotypic butterfly genus in family Lycaenidae

Laeosopis is a monotypic butterfly genus in the family Lycaenidae. Its only species is Laeosopis roboris, the Spanish purple hairstreak, which is found on the Iberian Peninsula and south-eastern France.

The wingspan is 12–15 mm.

== Description in Seitz ==
L. roboris Esp. (= evippus Hbn.) (72 d). Upperside black, with ultramarine scaling in the male from the base to the broad outer area, in the female only in the basal area. Underside ashy grey, with a yellow margin in which stand light blue spots and before which are proximally pale-edged black dots. Only in South France, especially the Pyrenees, and Spain. — lusitanica Stgr. (72 d) is the form from Portugal, which is more glossy yellow beneath and has a broad yellowish red marginal band bearing hardly any spots on the forewing. Whereas nymotypical roboris occurs in South Spain, Staudinger obtained a transitional form in Castilia. Egg globular, reddish. Larva woodlouse-shaped, grey, with short black bristles, two dark yellow, interrupted dorsal lines, between which there is a black spot behind the head; venter dirty yellow, legs yellow. Sluggish, but feeds quickly (Hofner). From April till the end of May on ash and privet. Pupa barrel-shaped, fastened with several separate threads. The butterflies occur from June till the autumn in valleys with trees and shrubs and are plentiful in some places; they settle particularly on ash and chestnut, and when disturbed generally return to the same spot and therefore are easily obtainedin good condition (Elwes). The butterfly flies from April to October depending on the location.

== Subspecies ==
- L. r. escorialensis Oberthür 1910
- L. r. lusitanica Staudinger, [1892] Portugal
- L. r. demissa Verity, 1943 Italy
- L. r. higginsi Agenjo, 1963 Spain (Granada)
- L. r. magis Agenjo, 1963 north-western Spain
- L. r. mudarra Agenjo, 1963 north-eastern Spain
- L. r. portaensis Betti, 1977 eastern Pyrenees
- L. r. thiersi Betti, 1977 southern France

== Biology ==
The larvae feed primarily on Fraxinus excelsior, but also other Fraxinus species and possibly Ligustrum vulgare.
