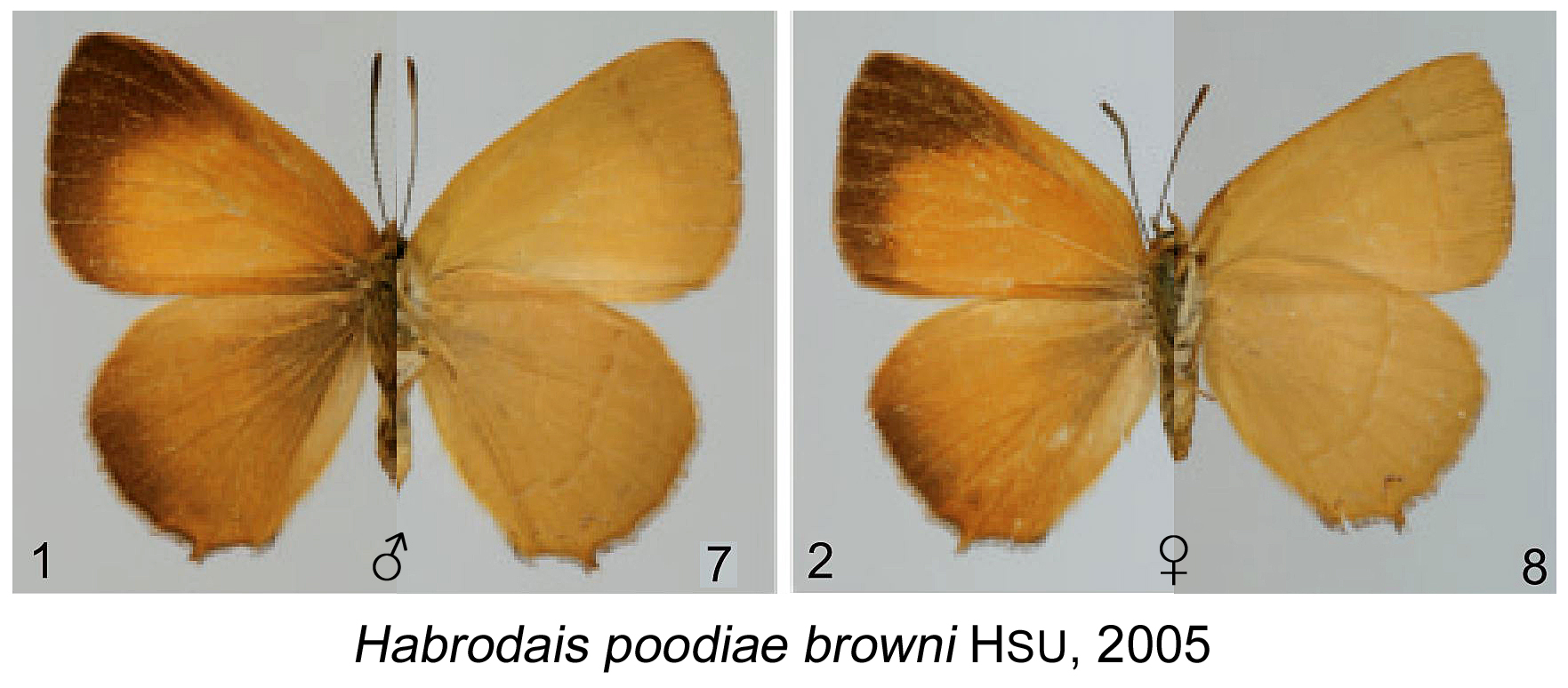

Scientific classification
- Kingdom: Animalia
- Phylum: Arthropoda
- Class: Insecta
- Order: Lepidoptera
- Family: Lycaenidae
- Genus: Habrodais
- Species: H. poodiae

Binomial name
- Habrodais poodiae Brown & Faulkner, 1982

= Habrodais poodiae =

Species of butterfly

Habrodais poodiae is a butterfly in the family Lycaenidae. It was described by John Wesley Brown and David K. Faulkner in 1982. It is found in the Mexican state of Baja California.

== Etymology ==
The specific name is named after Poody Latislaw Brown
