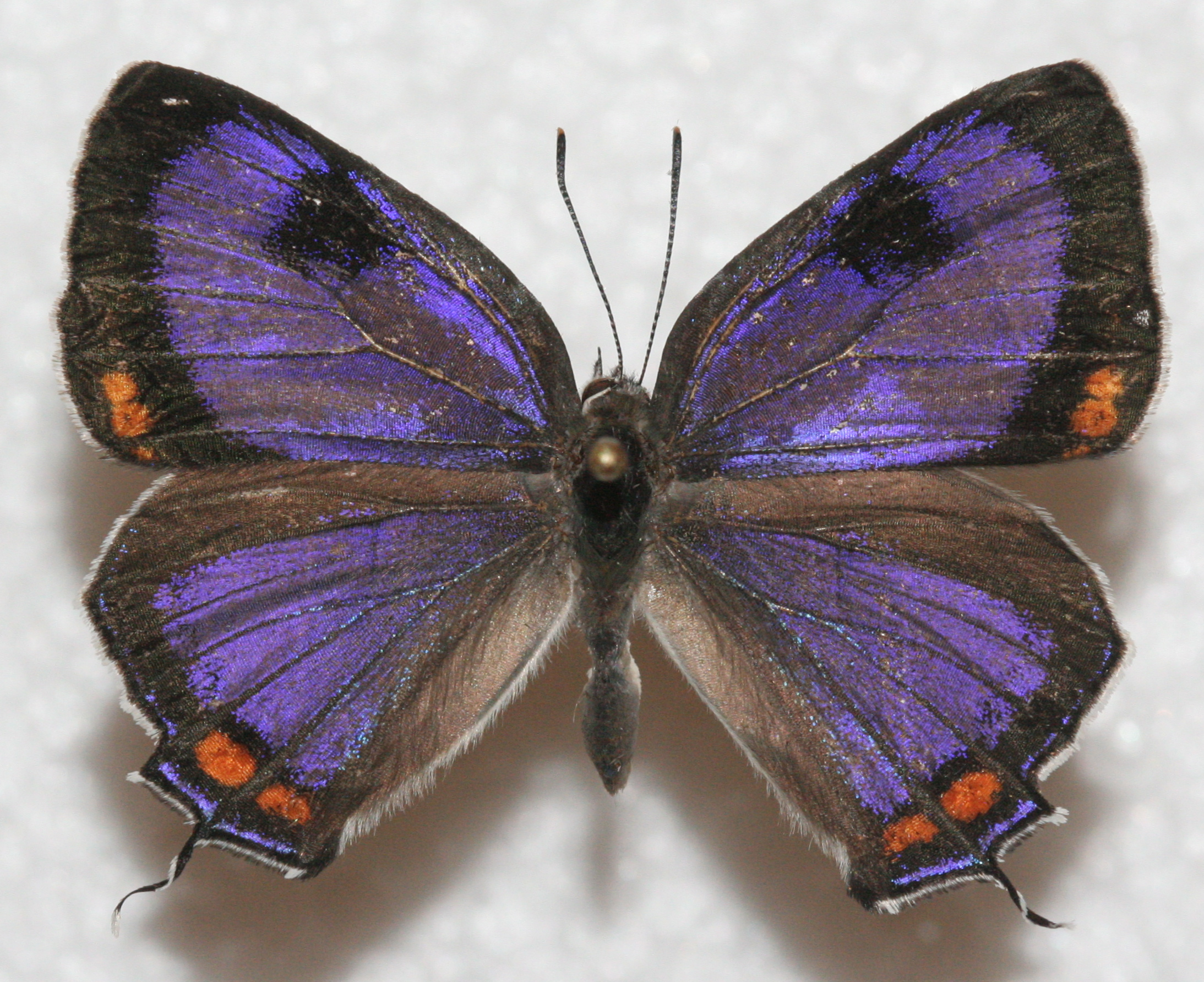
- Upperside

Conservation status
- Secure (NatureServe)

Scientific classification
- Kingdom: Animalia
- Phylum: Arthropoda
- Class: Insecta
- Order: Lepidoptera
- Family: Lycaenidae
- Subfamily: Theclinae
- Tribe: Theclini
- Genus: Hypaurotis; Scudder, 1876
- Species: H. crysalus

Binomial name
- Hypaurotis crysalus W. H. Edwards, 1873
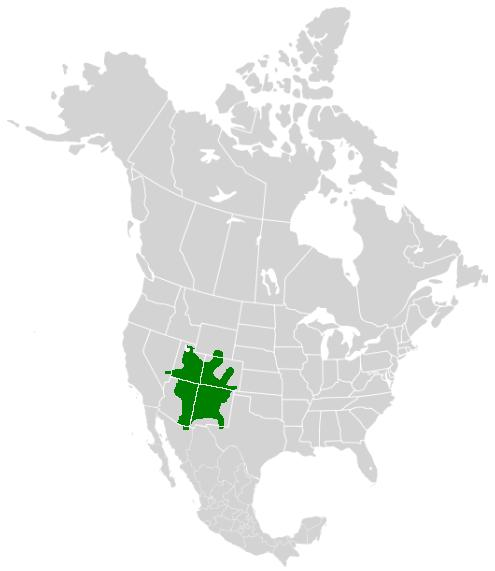

= Colorado hairstreak =

Species of butterfly

The Colorado hairstreak (Hypaurotis crysalus) is a montane butterfly native to oak scrubland in the southwestern United States and northern Mexico. It was designated the state insect of Colorado in 1996. It is the only species in the genus Hypaurotis.

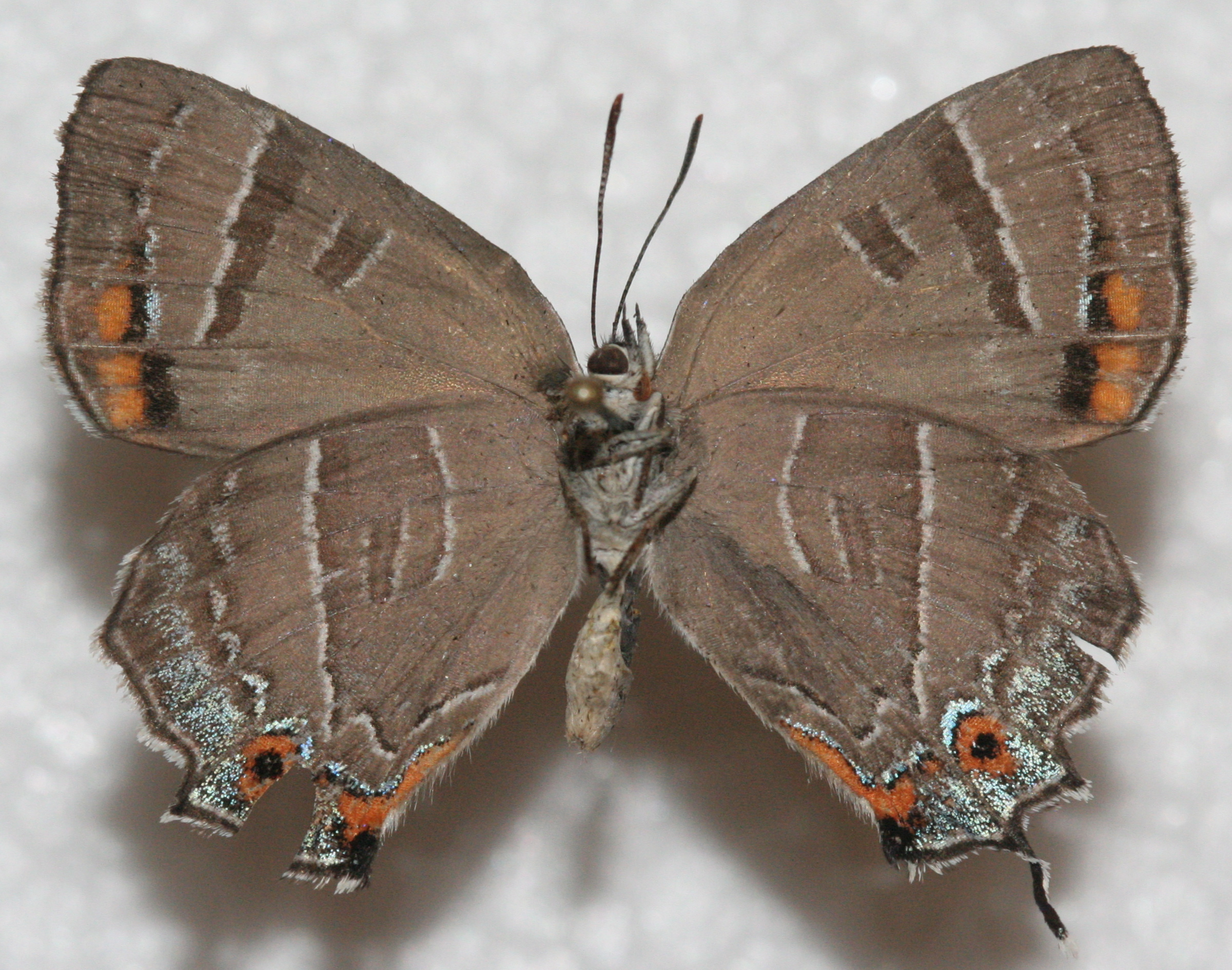
Underside of the wings

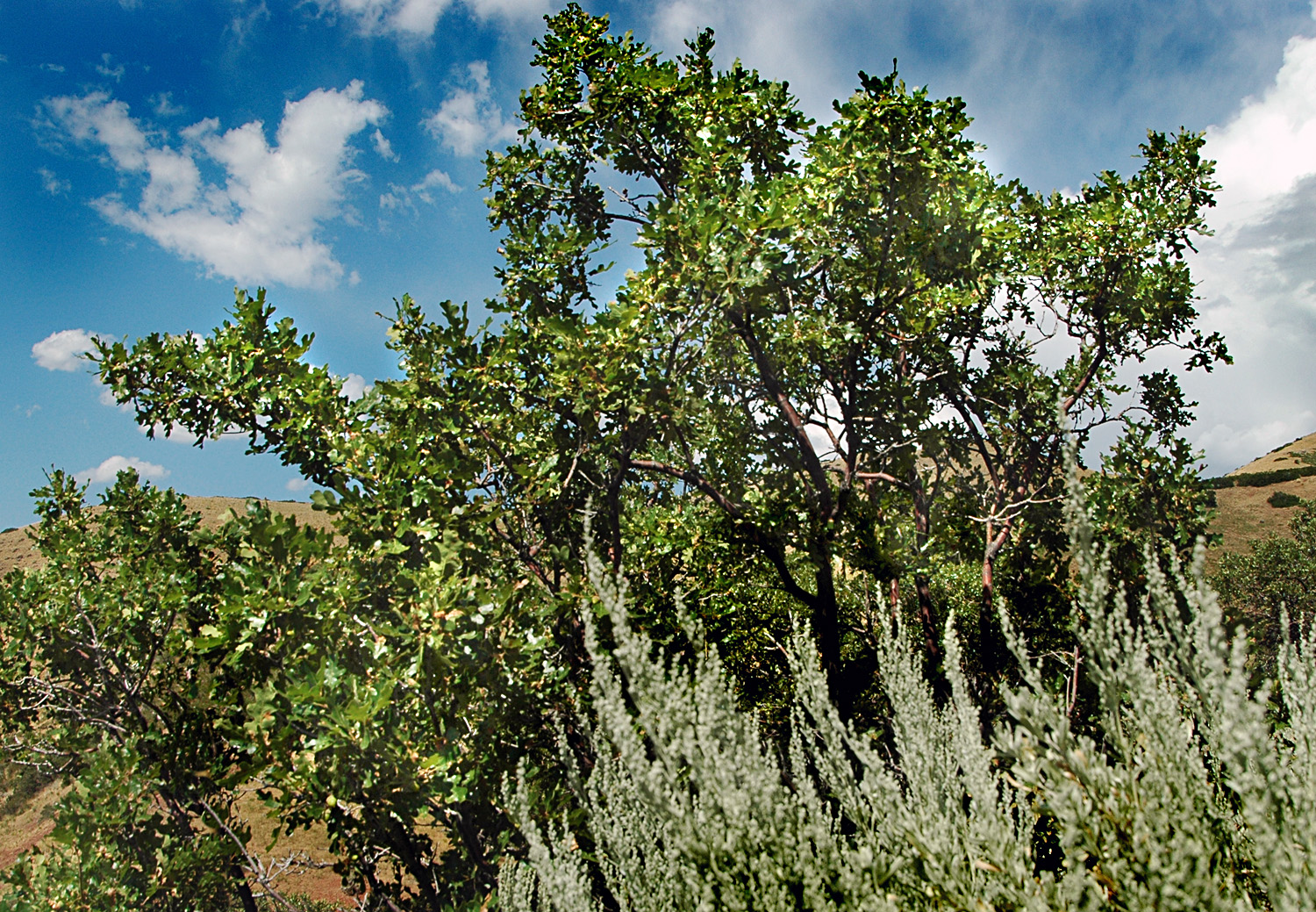
The Colorado hairstreak is found associated with the Gambel oak.

The upperside of the Colorado hairstreak's wings is dark purple with a broad black or dark border. Each wing has orange spots at the lower outer edge, and each hindwing has a thin hairlike tail. The lower side of the wings is pale to dark gray with white and dark markings, an orange patch on the margin of each forewing, and an orange spot with a black center on the hindwing near the tail. It has a wingspan of 3.1–3.8 cm (1.2–1.5 in). The thin hair-like tails that extend from its rear wings is likely the source of the "hairstreak" part of its name.

This species depends upon the Gambel oak (Quercus gambelii), which is both the favorite roost of adults and usual food source for caterpillars. Eggs are laid singly in late summer on twigs of Gambel oaks or another oak species. The caterpillars emerge in the spring and eat young leaves. Adults feed on tree sap and probably honeydew secreted by other insects rather than on flowers. The species has one flight, usually from mid-June to August. It is found mainly in Utah, Colorado, Arizona, and New Mexico, the Colorado Plateau states, although it can also be found in small portions of Nevada, Wyoming, and Durango, Mexico.
