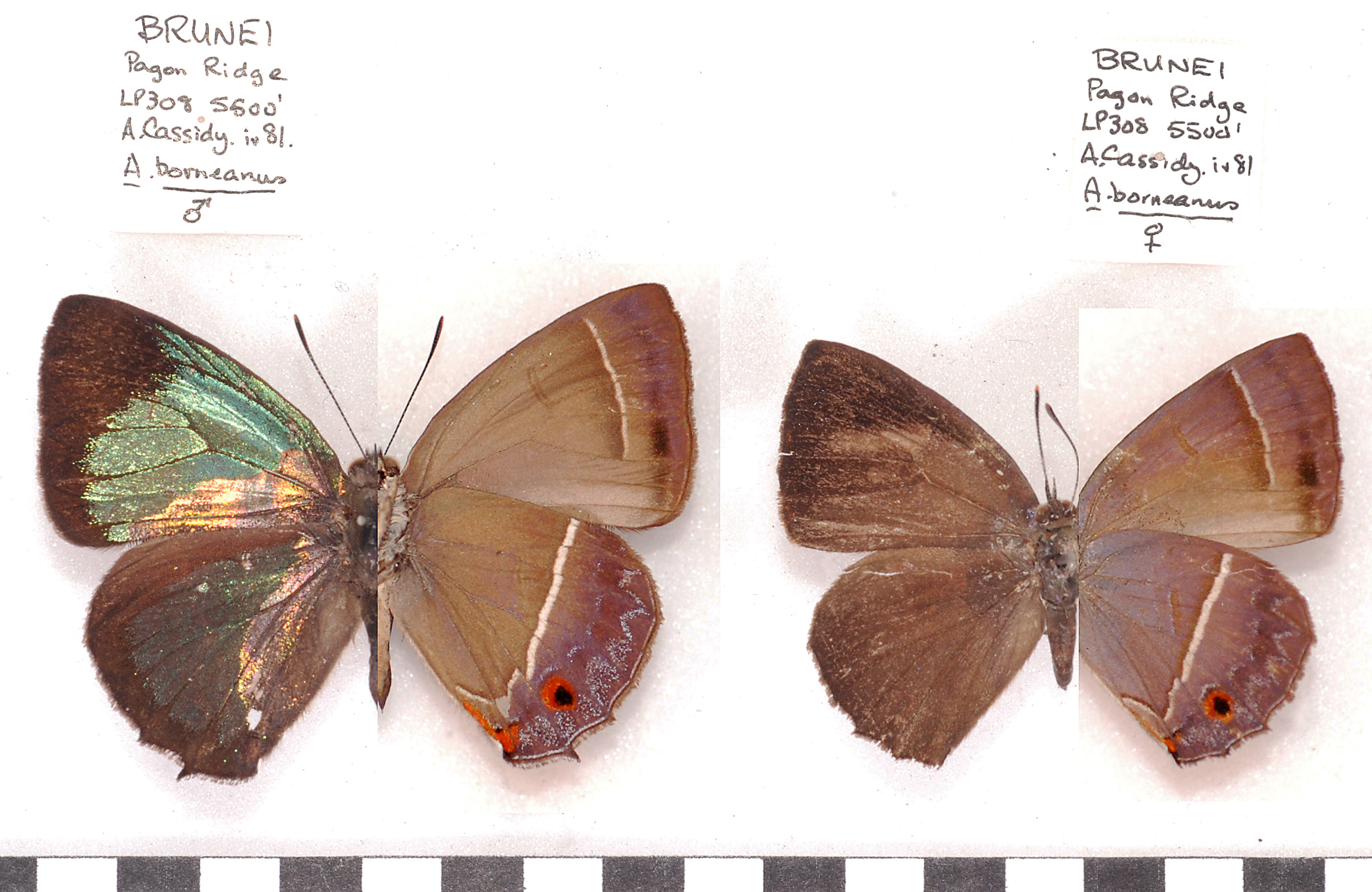
- Austrozephyrus borneanus
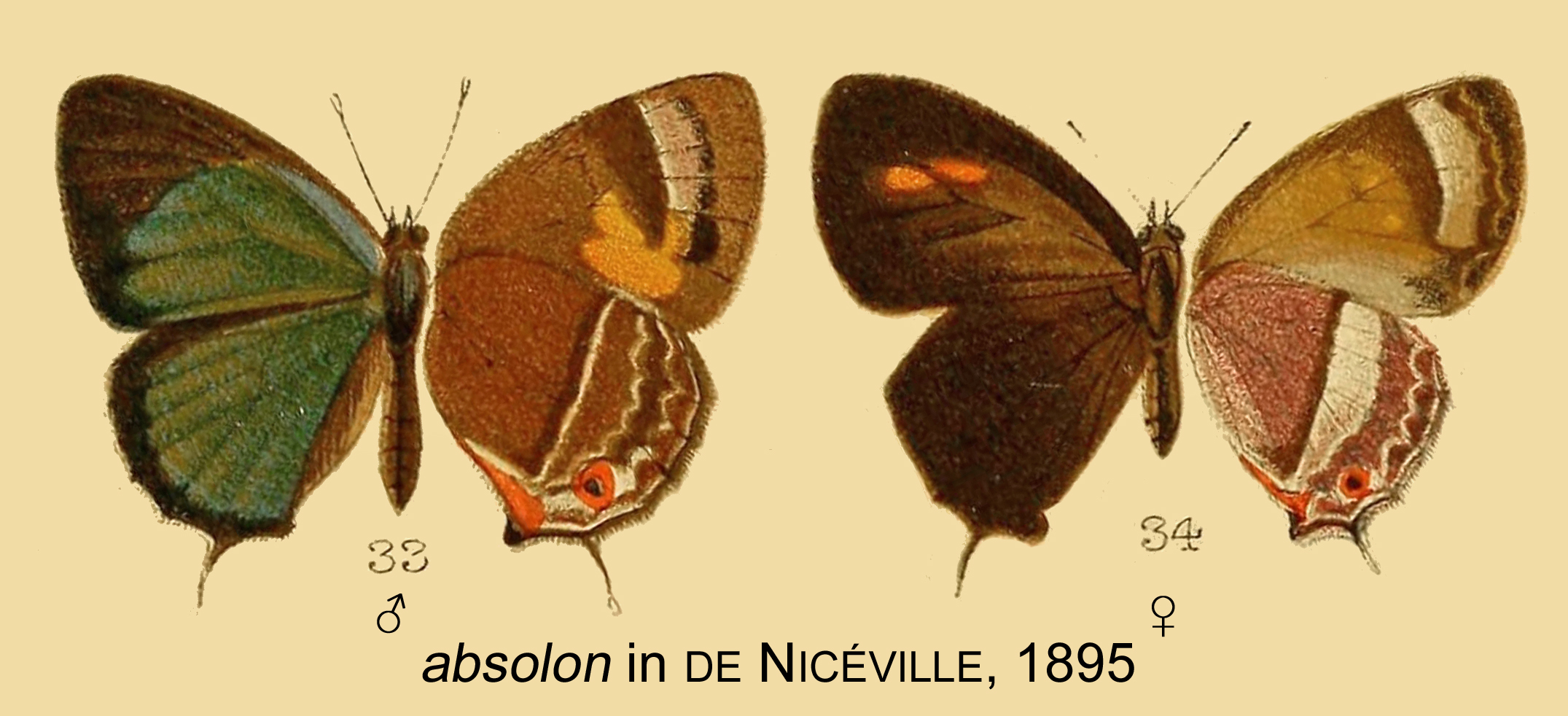
- Austrozephyrus absolon

Scientific classification
- Domain: Eukaryota
- Kingdom: Animalia
- Phylum: Arthropoda
- Class: Insecta
- Order: Lepidoptera
- Family: Lycaenidae
- Tribe: Theclini
- Genus: Austrozephyrus; Howarth, 1957

= Austrozephyrus =

Butterfly genus in family Lycaenidae

Austrozephyrus is a genus of butterflies in the family Lycaenidae. The three species are found in the Indomalayan realm.

== Species ==
- Austrozephyrus absolon (Hewitson, 1865)
  - A. a. absolon Peninsular Malaya
  - A. a. albifasciatus Howarth, 1957 Java
  - A. a. thamar (Toxopeus, 1935) Sumatra
  - A. a. acosmeta (Toxopeus, 1935) Java
- Austrozephyrus borneanus (Pendlebury, 1939) Borneo Palawan
- Austrozephyrus reginae Schröder & Treadaway, 1982 Palawan
