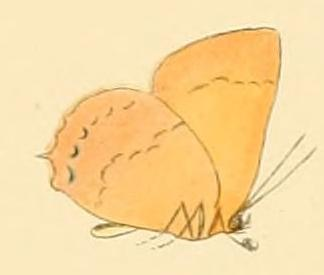

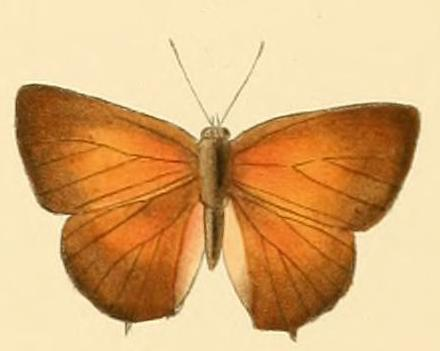

Conservation status
- Secure (NatureServe)

Scientific classification
- Kingdom: Animalia
- Phylum: Arthropoda
- Clade: Pancrustacea
- Class: Insecta
- Order: Lepidoptera
- Family: Lycaenidae
- Genus: Habrodais
- Species: H. grunus

Binomial name
- Habrodais grunus (Boisduval, 1852)

Synonyms
- Thecla grunus Boisduval, 1852; Dipsas grunus; Habrodais grunus lorquini f. chloris Field, 1938

= Habrodais grunus =

Species of butterfly

Habrodais grunus, the golden hairstreak, is a butterfly in the family Lycaenidae. It is found in North America in southern Arizona, Oregon, California, Washington, Idaho, and Mexico. The habitat consists of oak woodland, canyons and mountain ridges.

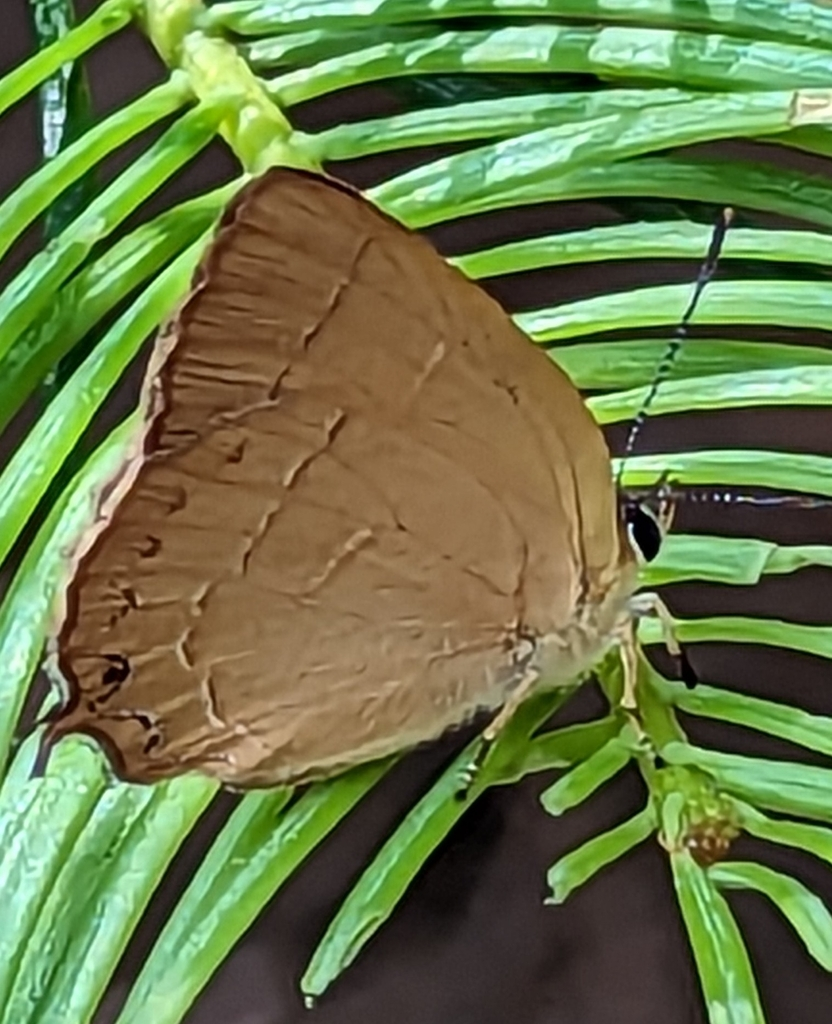
Habrodais grunus observed in Sierra City, California

The wingspan is 25–32 mm. Adults have a golden-brown coloration on their body, and have a short tail. Adults are on wing from June to September in one generation per year. Adults are primarily crepuscular, being most active in the early morning and evening, while resting in shaded areas for the remainder of the day. They feed on moisture from various sources and possibly also feed on aphid honeydew or other exudates. They spend the majority of their time above in the trees, only descending for nectar.

The larvae, which hatch from eggs laid on host twigs, feed on the young leaves of Chrysolepis chrysophylla, Quercus chrysolepis, Quercus vaccinifolia and Lithocarpus densiflorus. The caterpillars are blue-green in color on their body, and have silver hairs. In their subsequent pupa stage, they are bluish-green with brown dots. The caterpillars will mature to their adult stage in the span of approximately 2 weeks.

== Subspecies ==
- Habrodais grunus grunus (California, specifically in Sierra Nevada and Southern California)
- Habrodais grunus herri Field, 1938 (Central California, Oregon, Idaho)
- Habrodais grunus lorquini Field, 1938 (Northern California)
