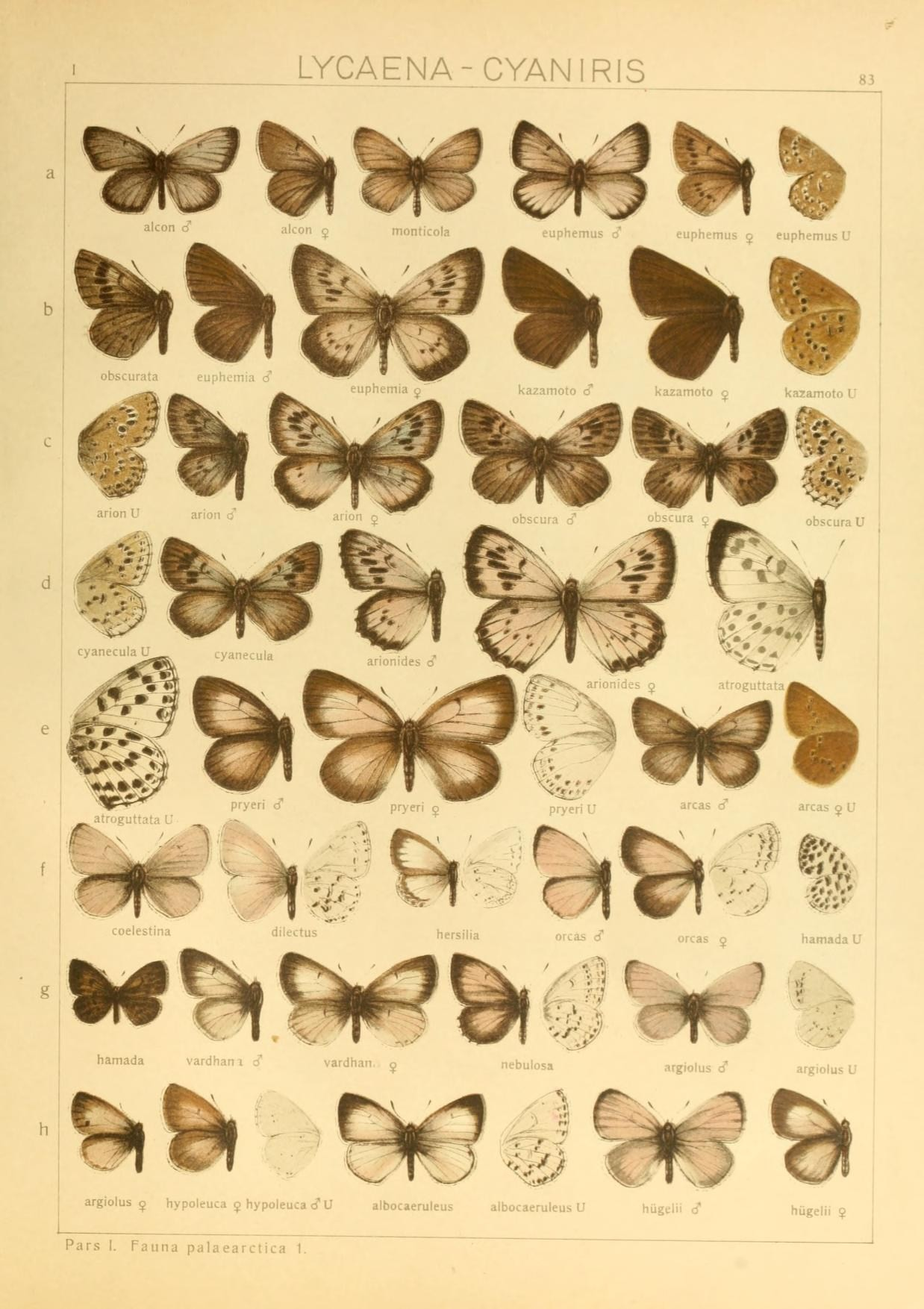
- Artopoetes pryeri in Seitz

Scientific classification
- Domain: Eukaryota
- Kingdom: Animalia
- Phylum: Arthropoda
- Class: Insecta
- Order: Lepidoptera
- Family: Lycaenidae
- Genus: Artopoetes
- Species: A. pryeri

Binomial name
- Artopoetes pryeri (Murray, 1873)

= Artopoetes pryeri =

Species of butterfly

Artopoetes pryeri is a small butterfly found in the East Palearctic (Northeast China South Amur, Ussuri, Korea, Japan) that belongs to the lycaenids or blues family.

== Description ==
L. pryeri Murr. (83 e). Very large, above with a broad dark margin, the basal area violet, in the male the disc also violet, but in the female whitish. Underside white with 2 rows of dark dots near the margin. — In Amurland and Japan, not rare, in June and July. The species looks on the wing like a Pierid. The larva on Syringa amurensis, full-grown in June (Doerries). This aberrant-looking form might likewise be placed into a separate genus.

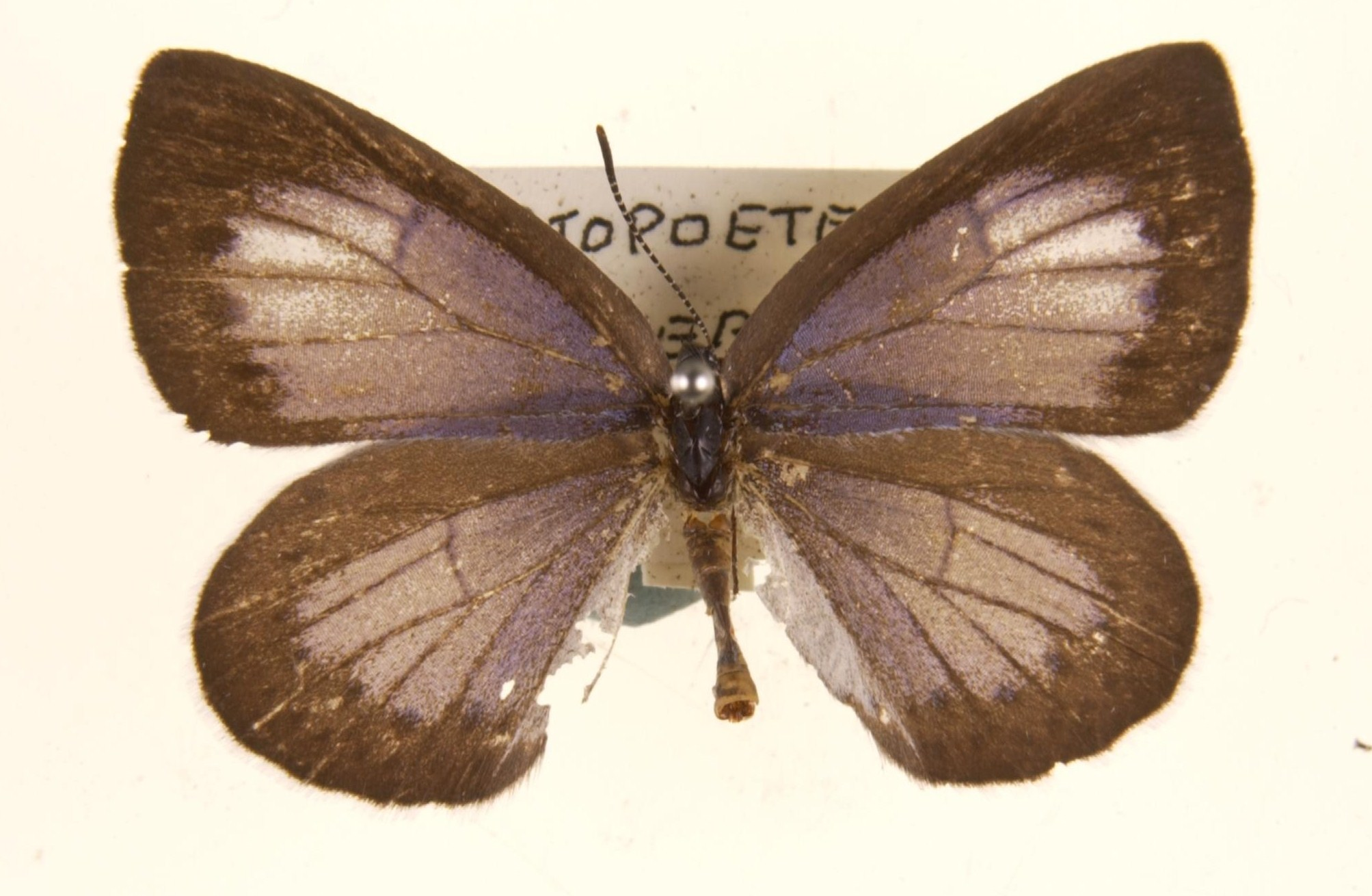
Artopoetes pryeri Japan

== See also ==
- List of butterflies of Russia
