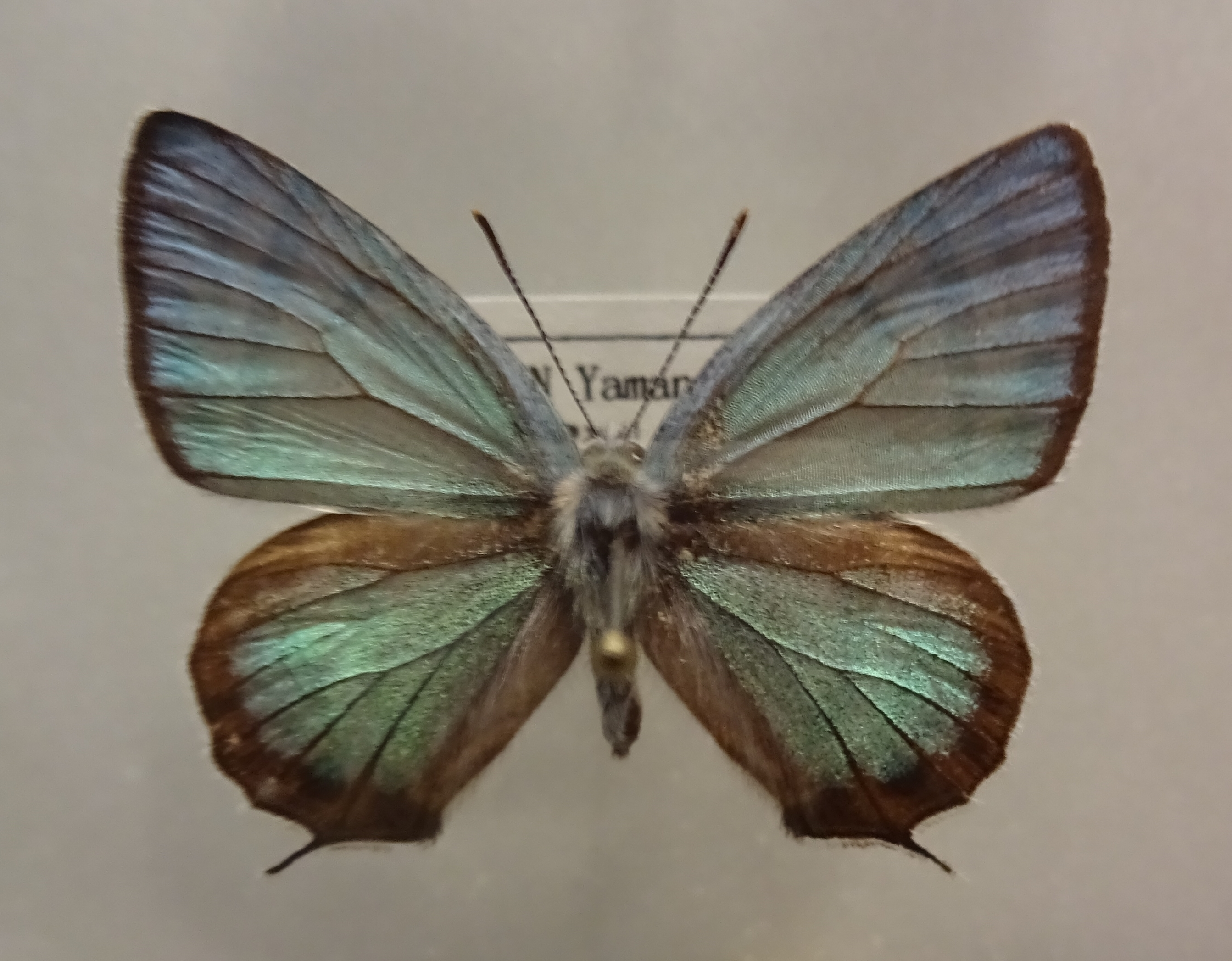

Scientific classification
- Kingdom: Animalia
- Phylum: Arthropoda
- Class: Insecta
- Order: Lepidoptera
- Family: Lycaenidae
- Tribe: Theclini
- Genus: Sibataniozephyrus; Inomata, 1986

= Sibataniozephyrus =

Butterfly genus in family Lycaenidae

Sibataniozephyrus is a genus of butterflies in the family Lycaenidae.

== Species ==
- Sibataniozephyrus fujisanus (Matsumura, 1910) Japan
- Sibataniozephyrus kuafui Hsu & Lin, 1994 Taiwan
- Sibataniozephyrus lijinae Hsu, 1995 China, Guizhou Prov., Tongren Prefecture, Mt. Fanjing, 1000-1350 m.
