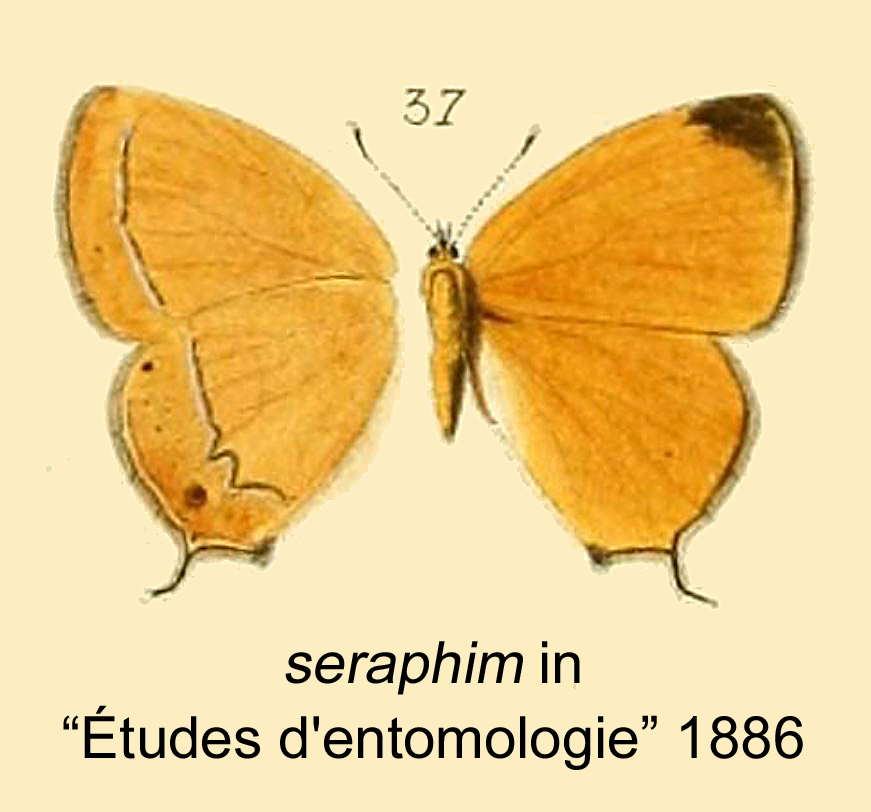

Scientific classification
- Kingdom: Animalia
- Phylum: Arthropoda
- Class: Insecta
- Order: Lepidoptera
- Family: Lycaenidae
- Genus: Gonerilia
- Species: G. seraphim

Binomial name
- Gonerilia seraphim (Oberthür, 1886)

Synonyms
- Thecla seraphim Oberthür, 1886; Gonerilia seraphium [sic] Shirôzu, 1962

= Gonerilia seraphim =

Species of butterfly

Gonerilia seraphim is a butterfly in the family Lycaenidae. It is found in China.

== Subspecies ==
- G. s. seraphim
- G. s. kimurai Koiwaya, 1996
- G. s. mekong Yoshino, 1999
