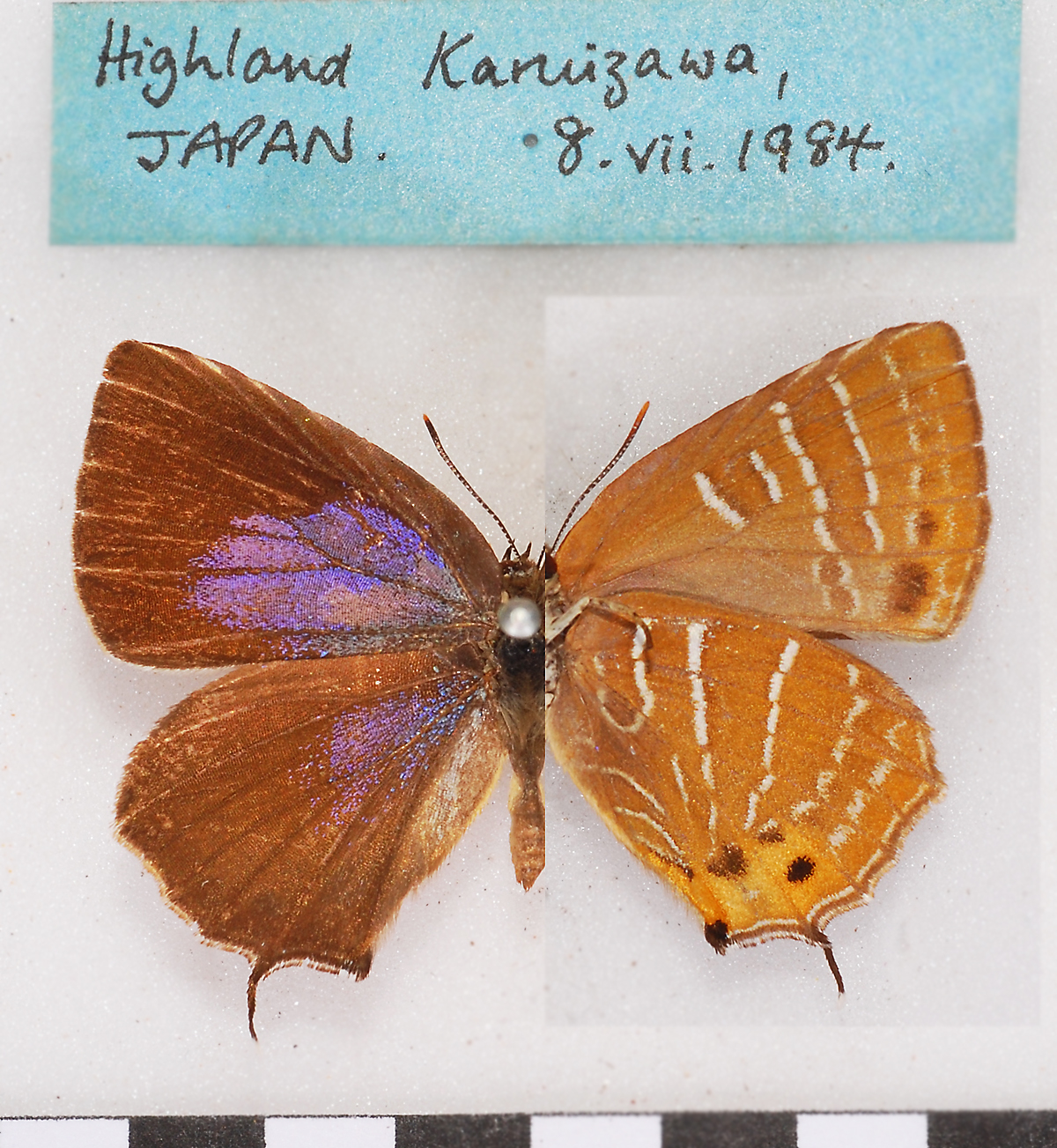

Scientific classification
- Domain: Eukaryota
- Kingdom: Animalia
- Phylum: Arthropoda
- Class: Insecta
- Order: Lepidoptera
- Family: Lycaenidae
- Genus: Wagimo
- Species: W. signata

Binomial name
- Wagimo signata (Butler, 1881)

Synonyms
- Thecla signata Butler, [1882]; Wagimo kyotoensis Murayama, 1953; Wagimo signatus signatus ab. iwateanus Murayama, 1964; Thecla quercivora Staudinger, 1887

= Wagimo signata =

Species of butterfly

Wagimo signata is a butterfly of the family Lycaenidae. It was described by Arthur Gardiner Butler in 1881. It is found in the Russian Far East (Ussuri, Primor'e), north-eastern and central China, Korea and Japan.

Adults hatch in the middle of July.

The larvae feed on Quercus species (including Q. dentata, Q. serrata, Q. mongolica, Q. acutissima, Q. alinea and Q. variabilis), as well as Cyclobalanospsis glauca.

== Subspecies ==
- Wagimo signata signata
- Wagimo signata minamii (Fujioka, 1994)
- Wagimo signata quercivora (Staudinger, 1887) (southern Ussuri)
