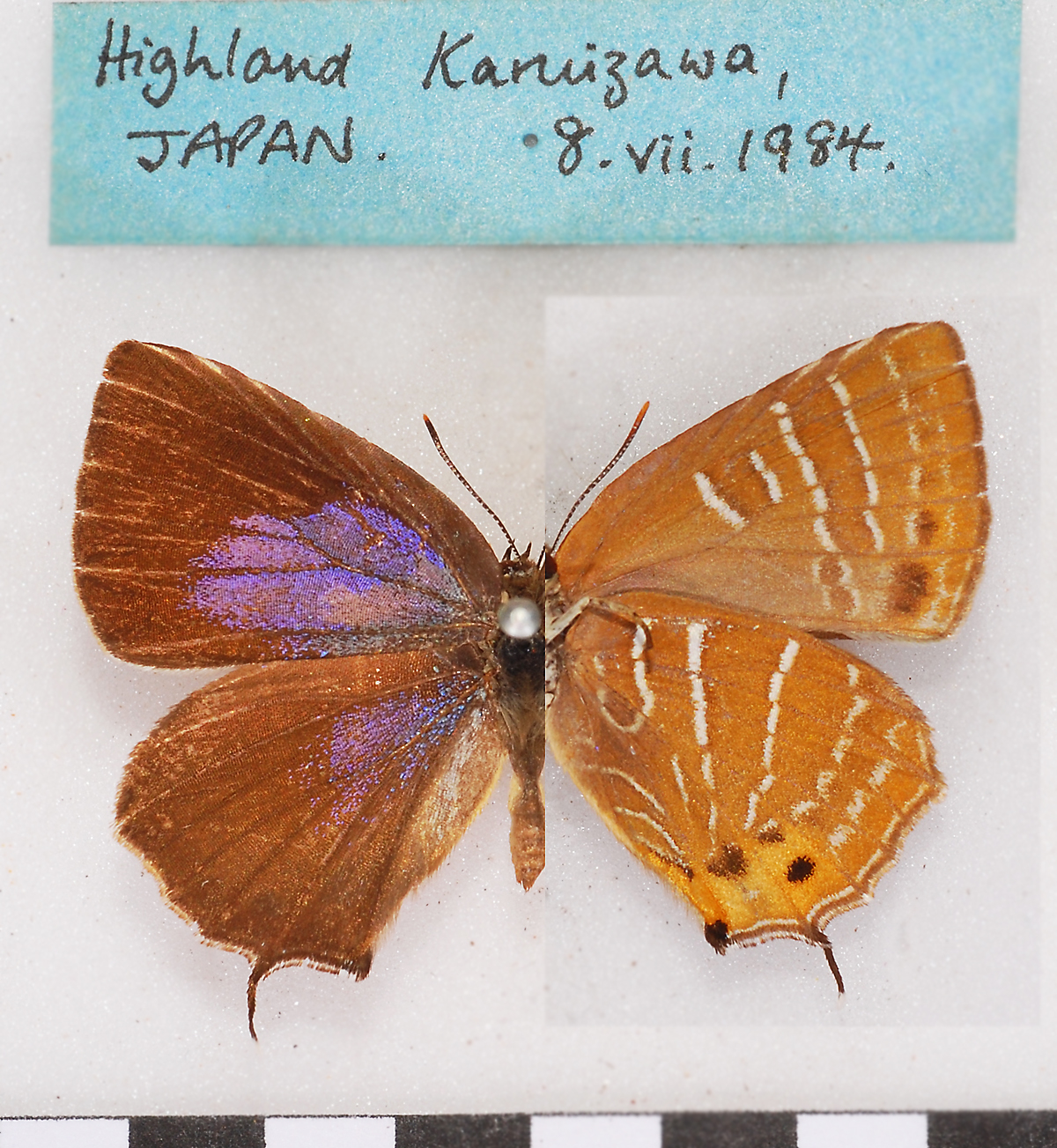
- Wagimo signata

Scientific classification
- Domain: Eukaryota
- Kingdom: Animalia
- Phylum: Arthropoda
- Class: Insecta
- Order: Lepidoptera
- Family: Lycaenidae
- Tribe: Theclini
- Genus: Wagimo; Sibatani & Ito, 1942

= Wagimo =

Butterfly genus in family Lycaenidae

Wagimo is a small East Asian (Ussuri, Myanmar, China, Korea, Japan) genus of butterflies in the family Lycaenidae.

Cladogram from Catalogue of Life:

- Wagimo
  - Wagimo insularis
  - Wagimo iwateanus
  - Wagimo signata
  - Wagimo slugeri
