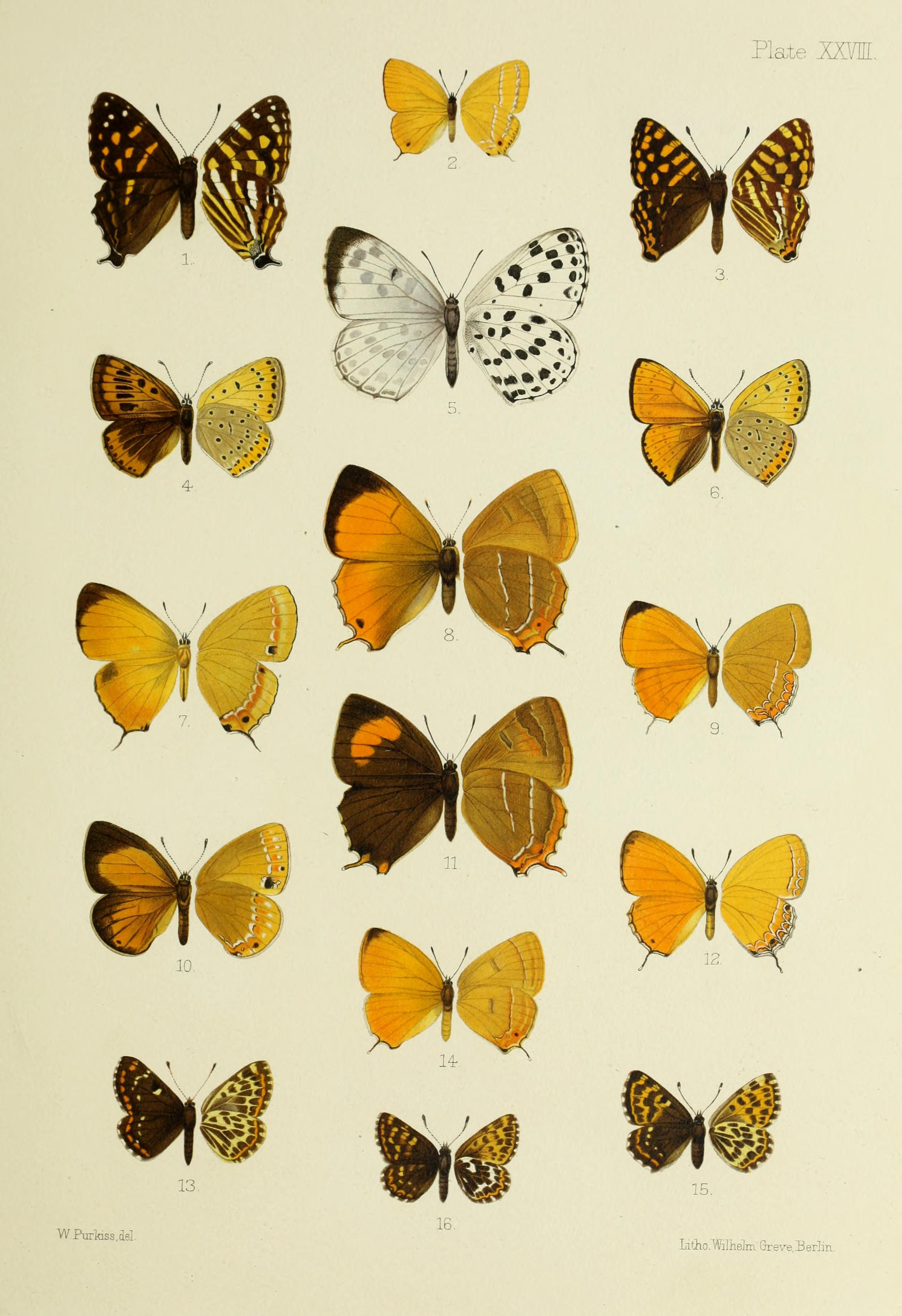
- Gonerilia thespis in Leech Butterflies from China, Japan, and Corea

Scientific classification
- Kingdom: Animalia
- Phylum: Arthropoda
- Clade: Pancrustacea
- Class: Insecta
- Order: Lepidoptera
- Family: Lycaenidae
- Genus: Gonerilia; Shirôzu & Yamamoto, 1956

= Gonerilia =

Butterfly genus in family Lycaenidae

Gonerilia is a genus of butterflies in the family Lycaenidae. It is endemic to China.

== Species ==
- Gonerilia thespis (Leech, 1890)
- Gonerilia seraphim (Oberthür, 1886)
- Gonerilia budda (Sugiyama, 1992)
- Gonerilia okamurai (Koiwaya, 1996)
- Gonerilia pesthis (Wang & Chou, 1998)
