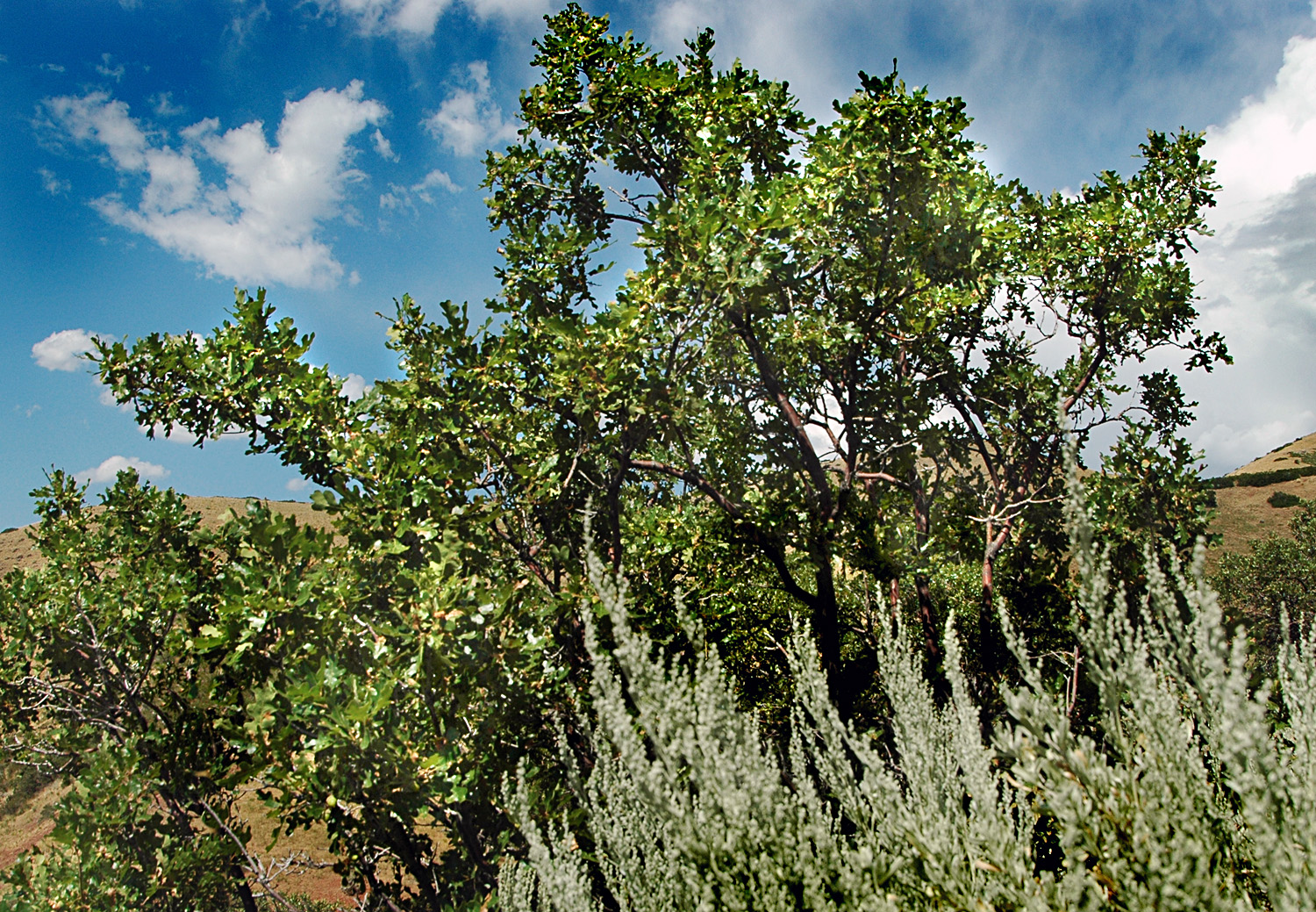

Conservation status
- Least Concern (IUCN 3.1)

- Secure (NatureServe)

Scientific classification
- Kingdom: Plantae
- Clade: Tracheophytes
- Clade: Angiosperms
- Clade: Eudicots
- Clade: Rosids
- Order: Fagales
- Family: Fagaceae
- Genus: Quercus
- Subgenus: Quercus subg. Quercus
- Section: Quercus sect. Quercus
- Species: Q. gambelii

Binomial name
- Quercus gambelii Nutt.
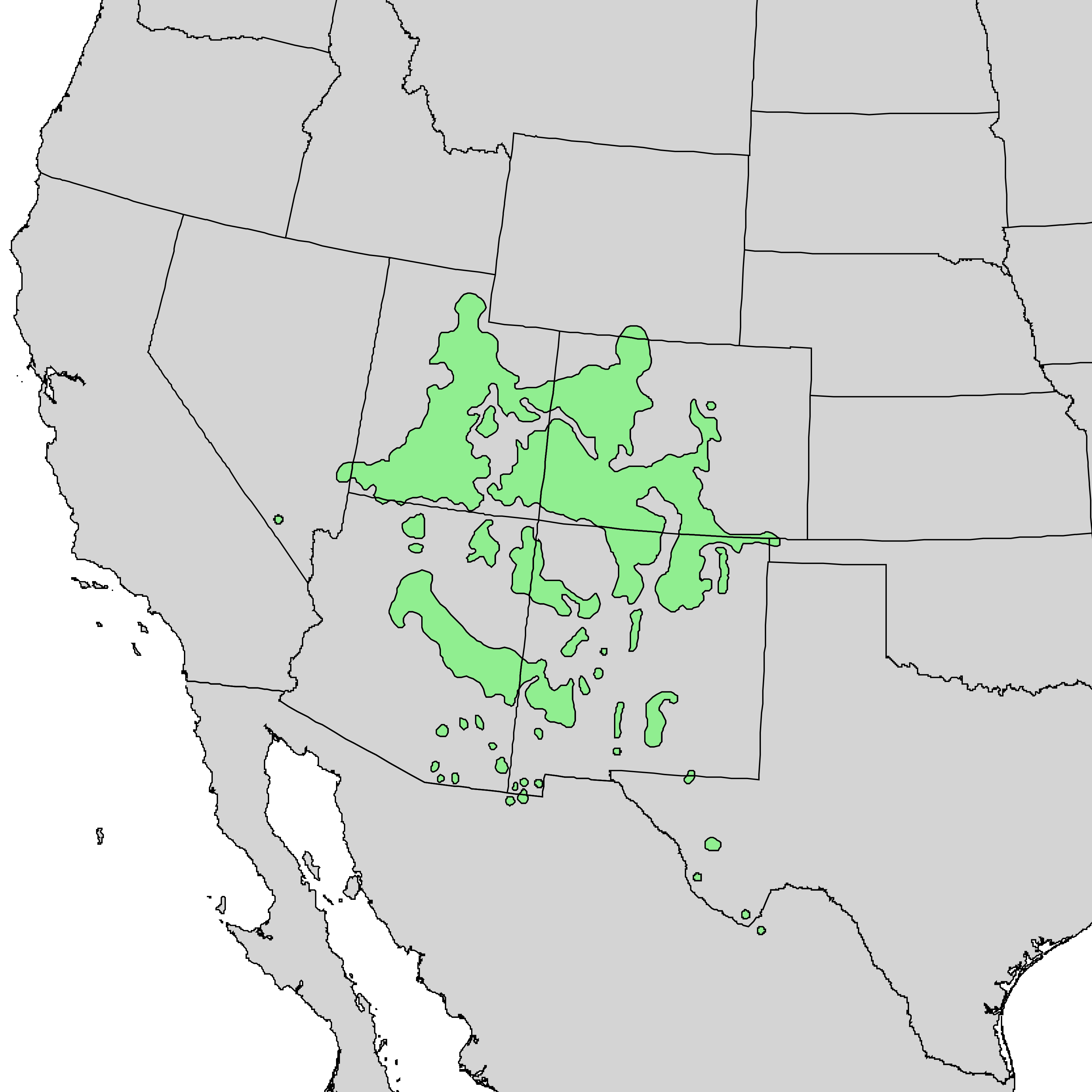
- Natural range of Quercus gambelii

Synonyms
- List: Quercus alba var. gunnisonii Torr. & A.Gray (1857); Quercus albifolia C.H.Mull. (1942); Quercus confusa Wooton & Standl. (1913); Quercus douglasii var. gambelii (Nutt.) A.DC. (1864); Quercus douglasii var. novomexicana A.DC. (1864); Quercus eastwoodiae Rydb. (1901); Quercus gambelii var. bonina S.L.Welsh (1986); Quercus gambelii subsp. eugambelii A.Camus (1939); Quercus gambelii var. gunnisonii (Torr. & A.Gray) Wenz. (1884); Quercus gambelii var. novomexicana (A.DC.) Garrett (1917); Quercus gambelii var. utahensis (A.DC.) Garrett (1917); Quercus gambelii var. vreelandii (Rydb.) A.Camus (1935); Quercus gambelii subsp. vreelandii (Rydb.) A.Camus (1935); Quercus gunnisonii Rydb. (1901); Quercus leptophylla Rydb. (1901); Quercus marshii C.H.Mull. (1937); Quercus media Wooton & Standl. (1913); Quercus nitescens Rydb. (1901); Quercus novomexicana (A.DC.) Rydb. (1901); Quercus novomexicana var. andrewsii Trel. (1924); Quercus novomexicana var. nitescens (Rydb.) A.Camus (1935); Quercus novomexicana var. typica A.Camus (1939); Quercus obtusifolia Rydb. (1901); Quercus × pauciloba subsp. confusa (Wooton & Standl.) A.Camus (1935); Quercus stellata var. utahensis A.DC. (1864); Quercus submollis Rydb. (1901); Quercus subobtusifolia A.Camus 1935); Quercus undulata var. gambelii (Nutt.) Engelm. (1876); Quercus undulata var. gunnisonii (Torr. & A.Gray) Engelm. (1876); Quercus × undulata var. obtusifolia A.DC. (1864); Quercus utahensis (A.DC.) Rydb. (1901); Quercus utahensis subsp. euutahensis A.Camus publ.; Quercus utahensis var. mollis Sarg. (1922); Quercus utahensis subsp. submollis (Rydb.) A.Camus (1935); Quercus utahensis var. submollis (Rydb.) Sarg. (1918); Quercus vreelandii Rydb. (1901)

= Quercus gambelii =

Gambel oak

Species of oak tree

Quercus gambelii, with the common name Gambel oak, is a deciduous small tree or large shrub that is widespread in the foothills and lower mountains of western North America. It is also regionally called scrub oak, oak brush, and white oak.

The common and scientific names, Gambel oak and Quercus gambelii, were named after the American naturalist William Gambel (1821–1849).

== Description ==
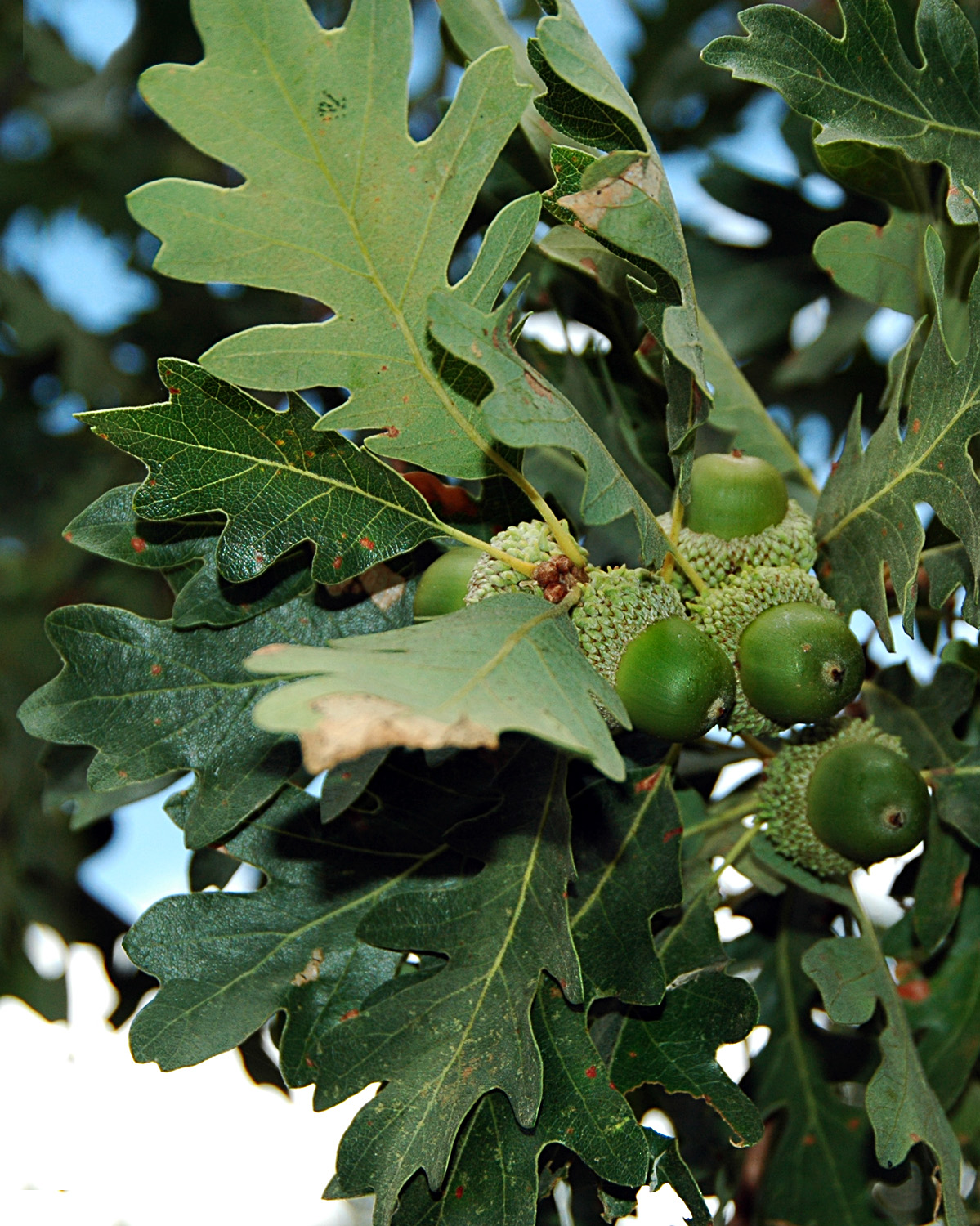
Gambel oak leaves.

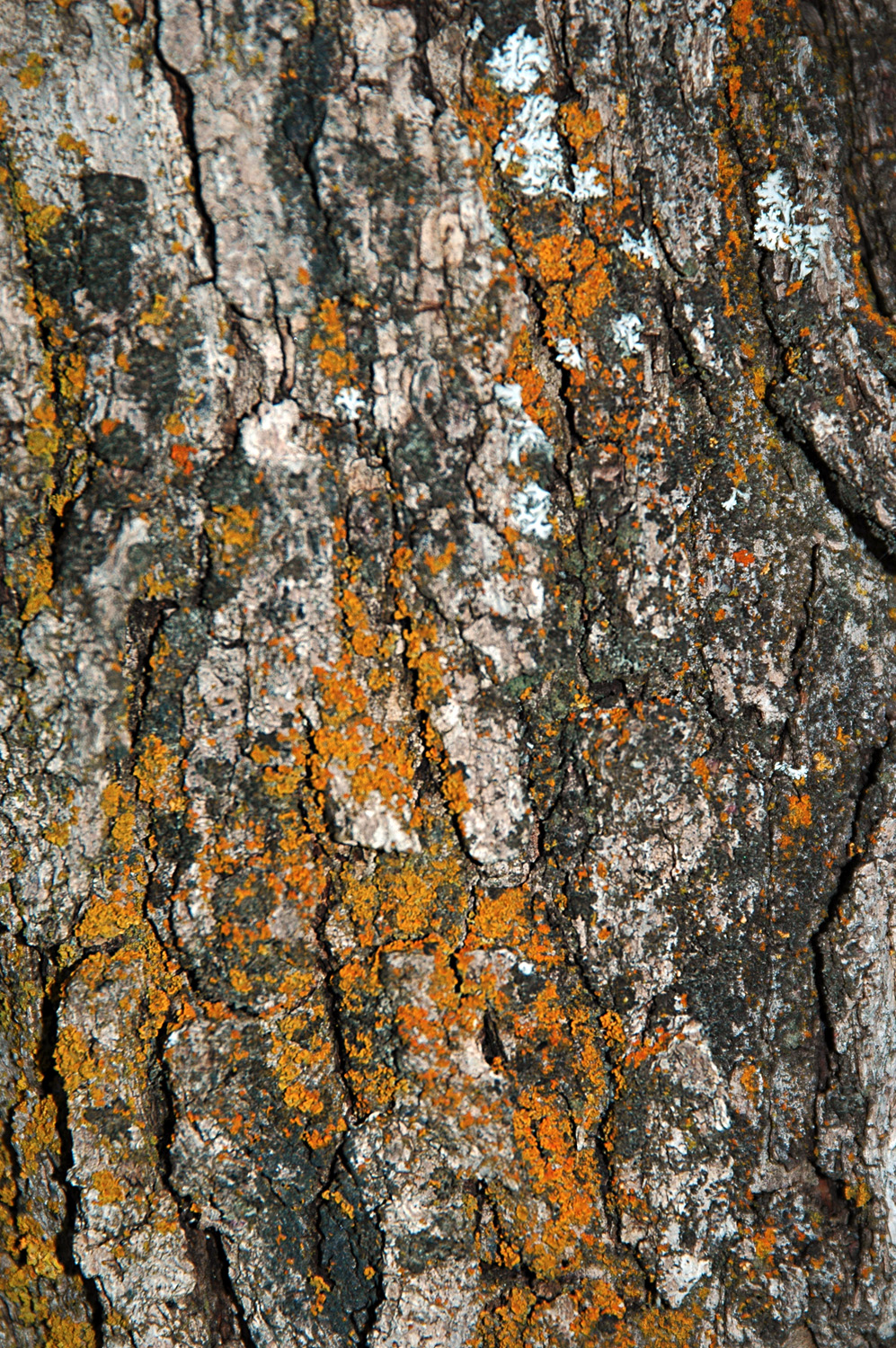
Bark on a mature Gambel oak.

Quercus gambelii trees differ in size from one location to another. The average mature height is from 3–9 metres (10–30 feet), but occasionally reaches heights of 18 m (59 ft) in some locations. Dwarf stands of plants under 1 m (3 1/4 ft) tall are common in marginal areas where heavy browsing occurs. The largest trees are found along streams in the southern part of its range; the champion tree is in Arizona at 35 m (114 ft) tall.

Although the wood is hard and dense, its branches are irregular and crooked, making them flexible enough to bend without breaking when covered with heavy snow. The bark is rough and brownish-gray.

The leaves are generally 7–12 centimetres (3–4 1/2 inches) long and 4–6 cm (1 1/2–2 1/2 in) broad, deeply lobed on each side of the central vein; the upper surface is glossy dark green, the undersurface is paler and velvety. Trees are deciduous and the leaves frequently turn orange and yellow during autumn, creating mountainsides of vivid colors. The flowers are inconspicuous unisexual catkins that occur in the spring.

The acorns are 10–20 millimetres (3/8–3/4 in) long and about one-third to one-half enclosed by a cap or cup (cupule); they mature in September, turning from green to golden brown. The plant reproduces from acorns, but also spreads from root sprouts that grow from vast underground structures called lignotubers. These reproductive characteristics often result in dense groves or thickets of trees that can cover entire mountainsides.

== Distribution and habitat ==
The natural range of Quercus gambelii is centered in the western United States and northwestern Mexico in the states of Arizona, Chihuahua, Colorado, New Mexico, Sonora, and Utah. It also extends into Nevada, Wyoming, Idaho, Nebraska, the Oklahoma Panhandle, Coahuila, and into the Trans-Pecos region of western Texas.

The tree typically grows at elevations of 1,000–3,000 m (3,300–9,800 ft) above sea level where precipitation averages between 30–60 cm (12–24 in) per year.

The species flourishes in full sun on hillsides with thin, rocky, alkaline soil where competition from other plant species is limited. It also does well in richer soils, but in those areas it is forced to compete for growing room. It is well-adapted to locations where wet springs and hot, dry summers create conditions conducive to wildfires.

== Ecology ==
After a fire, Gambel oak quickly re-establishes from root sprouts. The plant is drought tolerant.

Associated plant species include: chokecherry, arrowleaf balsamroot, bigtooth maple, mountain mahogany, ponderosa pine, and serviceberry. Associated birds and mammals include Woodhouse's scrub jay, black-billed magpie, grouse, deer, chipmunks and squirrels.

Where abundant, Gambel oak is an important food source for browsing animals such as deer and livestock. The sweetish acorns are frequently gathered by squirrels and stored for winter food. Acorns are also eaten by wild turkeys, black bears, and domestic animals such as hogs. Some insects depend on the Gambel oak: for example, the Colorado hairstreak butterfly uses it as a food source for caterpillars.

== Uses ==
Historically, acorns from Gambel oak provided a reliable source of food for Native Americans. If bitter, tannins can be leached from the acorns.
