= List of lycaenid genera: F =

The large butterfly family Lycaenidae contains the following genera starting with the letter F:

- Falcuna
- Famegana
- Fasslatonius
- Favonius
- Feniseca
- Flos
- Freyeria
