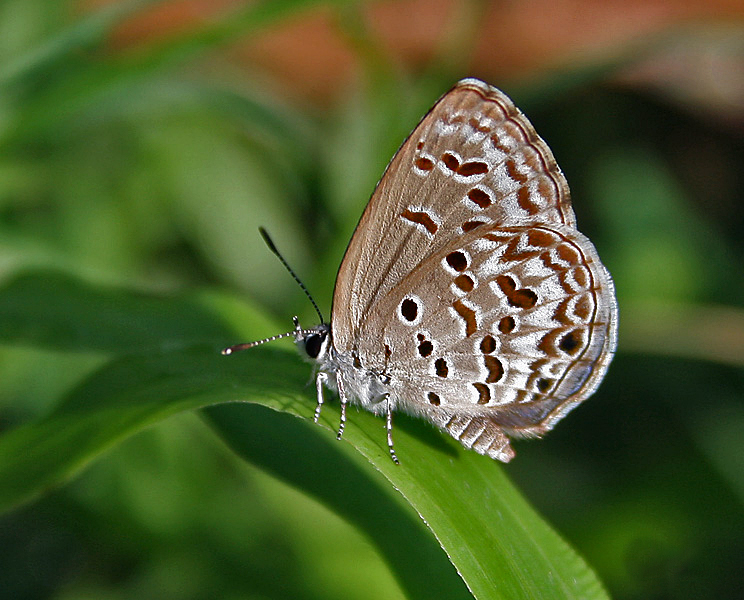
- Chilades lajus

Scientific classification
- Domain: Eukaryota
- Kingdom: Animalia
- Phylum: Arthropoda
- Class: Insecta
- Order: Lepidoptera
- Family: Lycaenidae
- Subfamily: Polyommatinae
- Tribe: Polyommatini
- Genus: Chilades; Moore, [1881]

= Chilades =

Jewel blues

Genus of butterflies

Chilades, commonly called jewel blues, is a genus of butterflies in the family Lycaenidae. The species of this genus are found in the Old World and in Australia.

== Species ==
Listed alphabetically:

- Chilades alberta (Butler, 1901) [now viewed as a species of Euchrysops]
- Chilades eleusis (Demaison, 1888)
- Chilades elicola (Strand, 1911)
- Chilades evorae Libert, Baliteau & Baliteau, 2011 - Cape Verde (Santo Antão)
- Chilades kedonga (Grose-Smith, 1898)
- Chilades lajus or Chilades laius (Stoll, [1780]) – lime blue
- Chilades naidina (Butler, [1886])
- Chilades parrhasius (Fabricius, 1793) – Indian Cupid
- Chilades roemli Kalis, 1933 Java
- Chilades saga Grose-Smith, 1895 Timor
- Chilades serrula (Mabille, 1890)
- Chilades yunnanensis Watkins, 1927 southwest China

Following recent molecular studies, several species that were previously included in Chilades have been moved to Freyeria and Luthrodes.

== Gallery ==
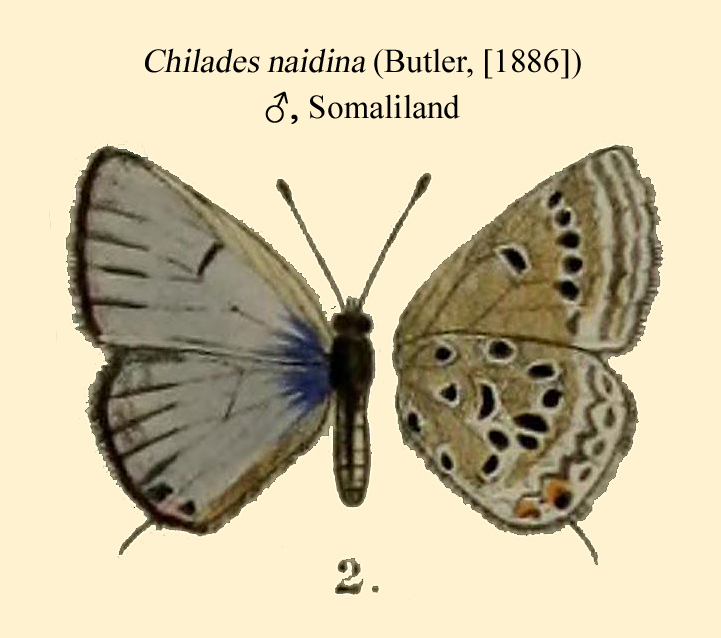
Chilades naidina

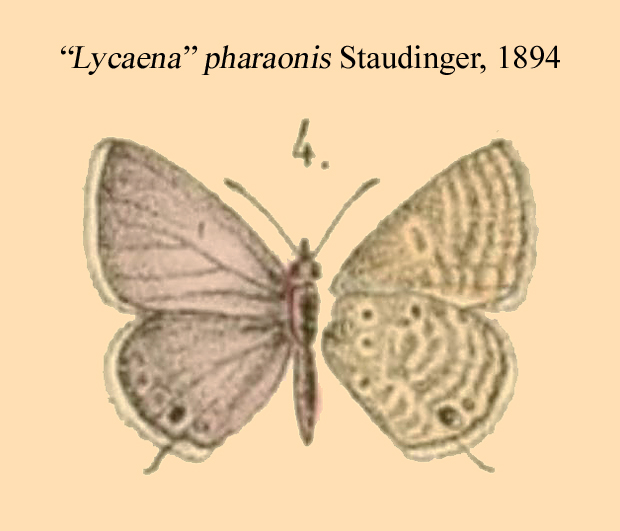
Chilades eleusis

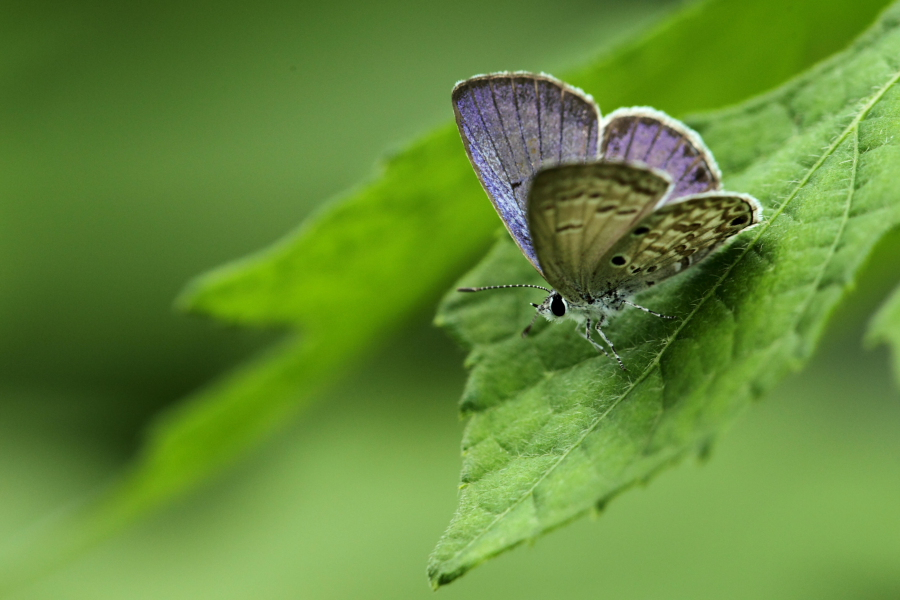
Chilades lajus

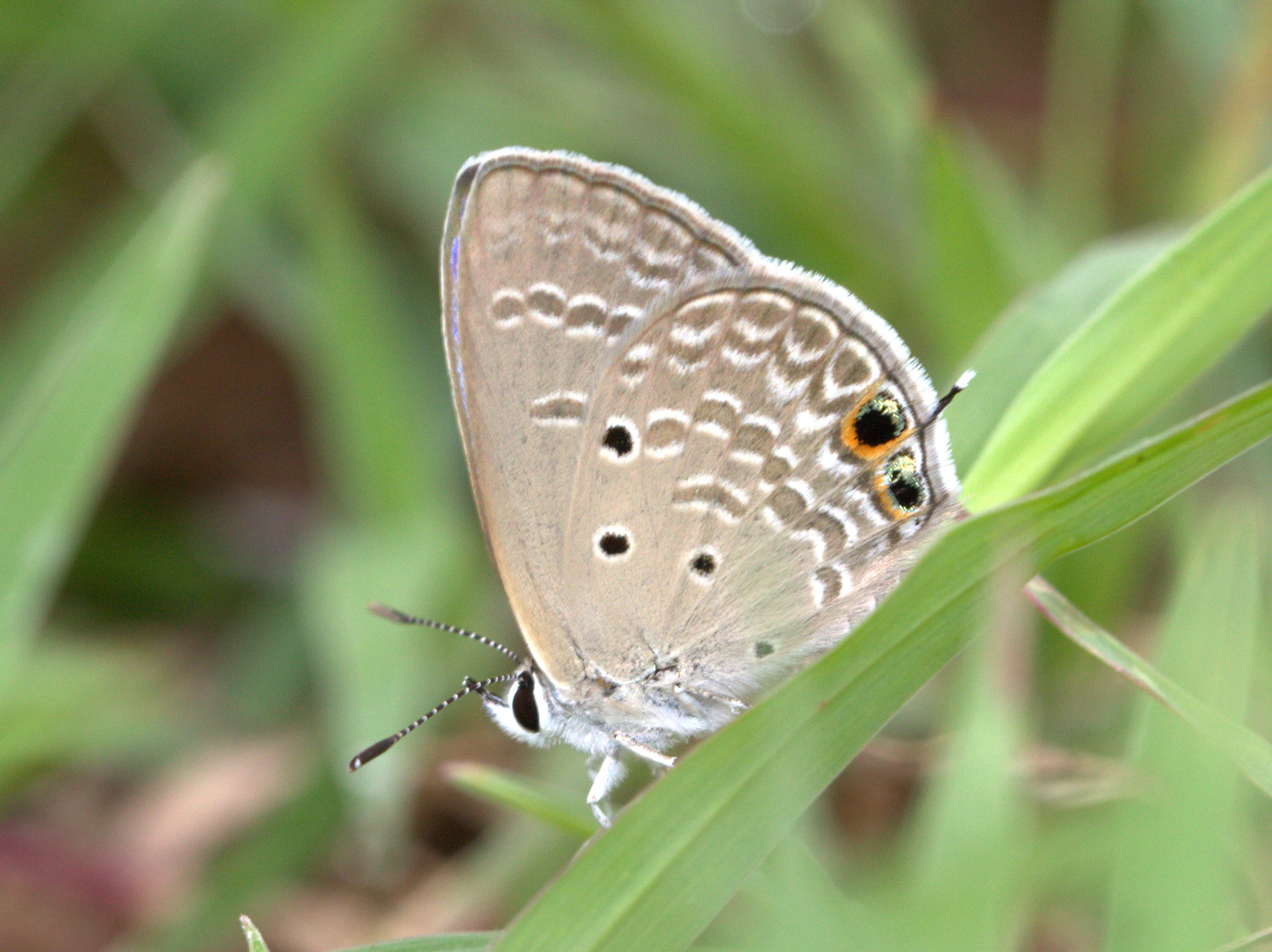
Chilades parrhasius
