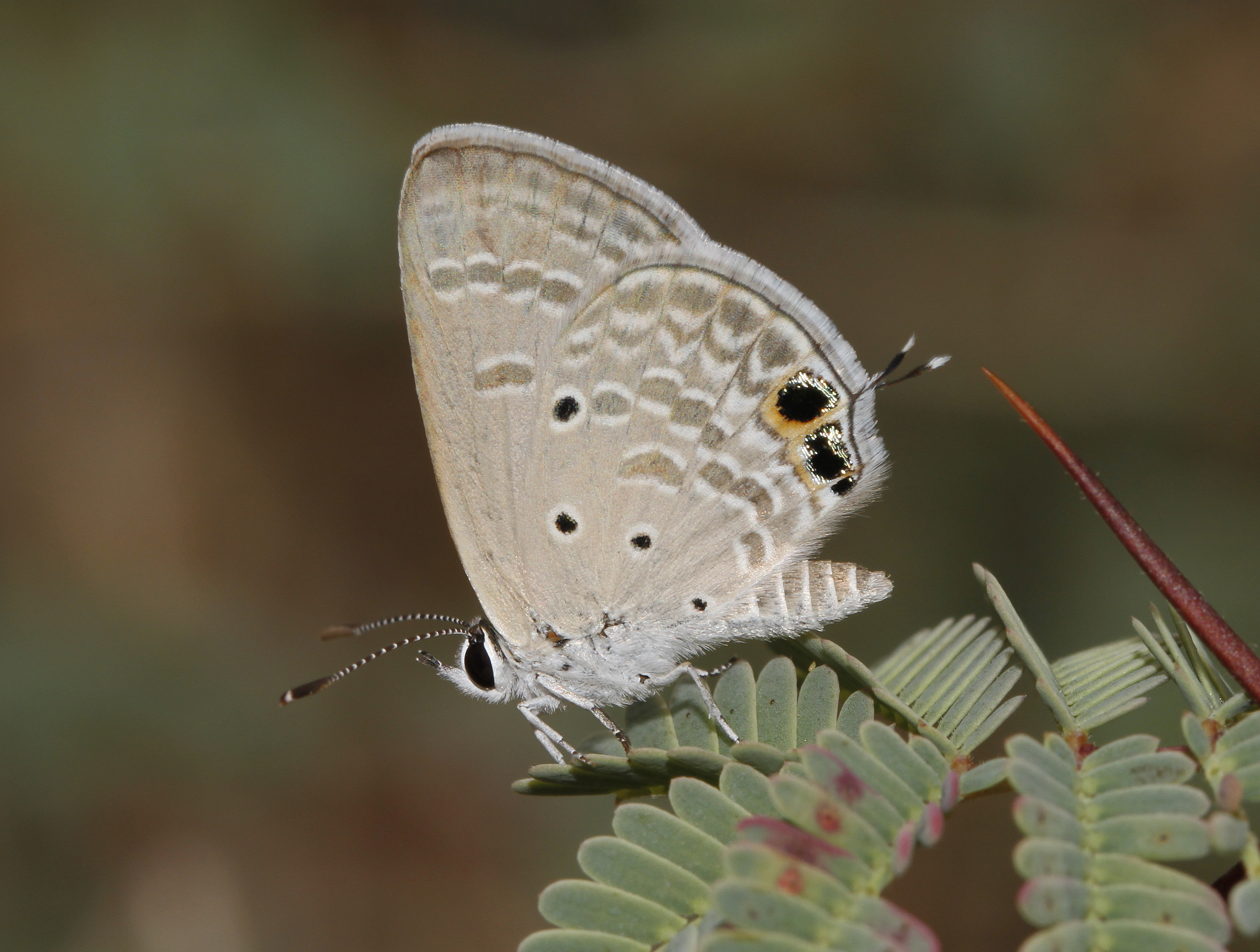

Scientific classification
- Domain: Eukaryota
- Kingdom: Animalia
- Phylum: Arthropoda
- Class: Insecta
- Order: Lepidoptera
- Family: Lycaenidae
- Genus: Chilades
- Species: C. parrhasius

Binomial name
- Chilades parrhasius (Fabricius 1793)

Synonyms
- Hesperia parrhasius Fabricius, 1793; Freyeria parrhasius; Euchrysops contracta nila Evans, 1925; Euchrysops parrhasius minuta Evans, 1932

= Chilades parrhasius =

Small Cupid

Species of butterfly

Chilades parrhasius, the small Cupid, is a small butterfly that belongs to the lycaenids or blues family. It is found in Nepal, southern Turan, southern Ghissar, Iran, Afghanistan, Pakistan, Sri Lanka, United Arab Emirates, Oman and southern, central and north-west India.

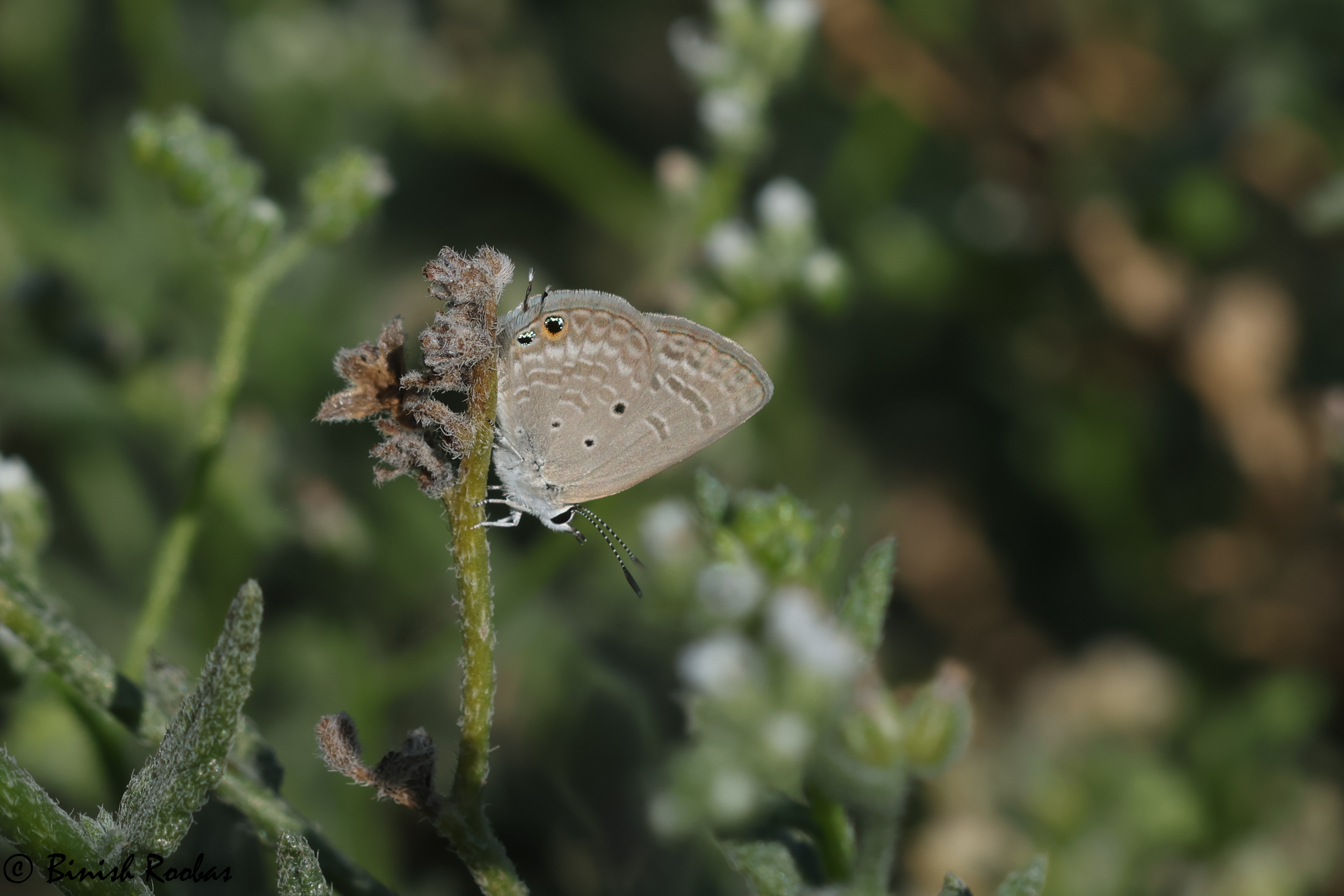
Chilades parrhasius from Al Ain, UAE

== Description ==
Wet-season Brood: Male. Upperside dark greyish-blue, with a lilacine tint. Forewing with a black terminal band broadening slightly towards the apex. Hindwing with the costal margin broadly blackish; the outer margin with a narrow black band, the upper portion composed of a series of spots joined together, inwardly pale-edged, and often with black marks running shortly up the veins, two large jet black spots in interspaces 2 and 3, and two minute black spots at the anal angle, all capped more or less with orange. Tails black tipped with white. Cilia of forewing grey, of hindwing white with black points at the vein ends. Underside greyish-white, all the markings white-edged. Forewing with a lunular mark at the end of the cell, a discal row of six lunular marks in line, the upper one a little inwards. Hindwing with three sub-basal small black spots, the middle one well inwards, and another similar spot, sub-apical close to the costa; a slender mark at the end of the cell, and a discal row of six lunular marks, the upper one inwards, just below the sub-apical black spot, the lowest mark also well inwards, the others in a gentle outward curve; the discal row on both wings well separated from the marginal series; both wings with a terminal brownish line and sub-terminal series of marks, lunular in the hindwings and between them a row of brownish spots, the two spots in interspaces 2 and 3, and sometimes another in interspace 4 black and large with some metallic specks and capped with obscure orange. Antennae black, ringed with white, head and body blackish above, with blue pubescence, white beneath.

Female. Upperside paler than the male, the blackish bands on both wings much broader; blackish lunular line generally present at the end of the cell on both wings. Underside more white than the male, the discal series similarly well separated from the marginal series in both wings, the lunular marks composing them darker and more prominent.

Dry-season Brood: Male and Female. Upperside pale lilacine greyish-blue; veins more or less prominent, the terminal bands narrower and much paler, the black spots capped with orange on the hindwing, small and generally present in both sexes. Underside with the markings similar to those of the wet-season form, but very minute and indistinct.

— Charles Swinhoe, Lepidoptera Indica. Vol. VII

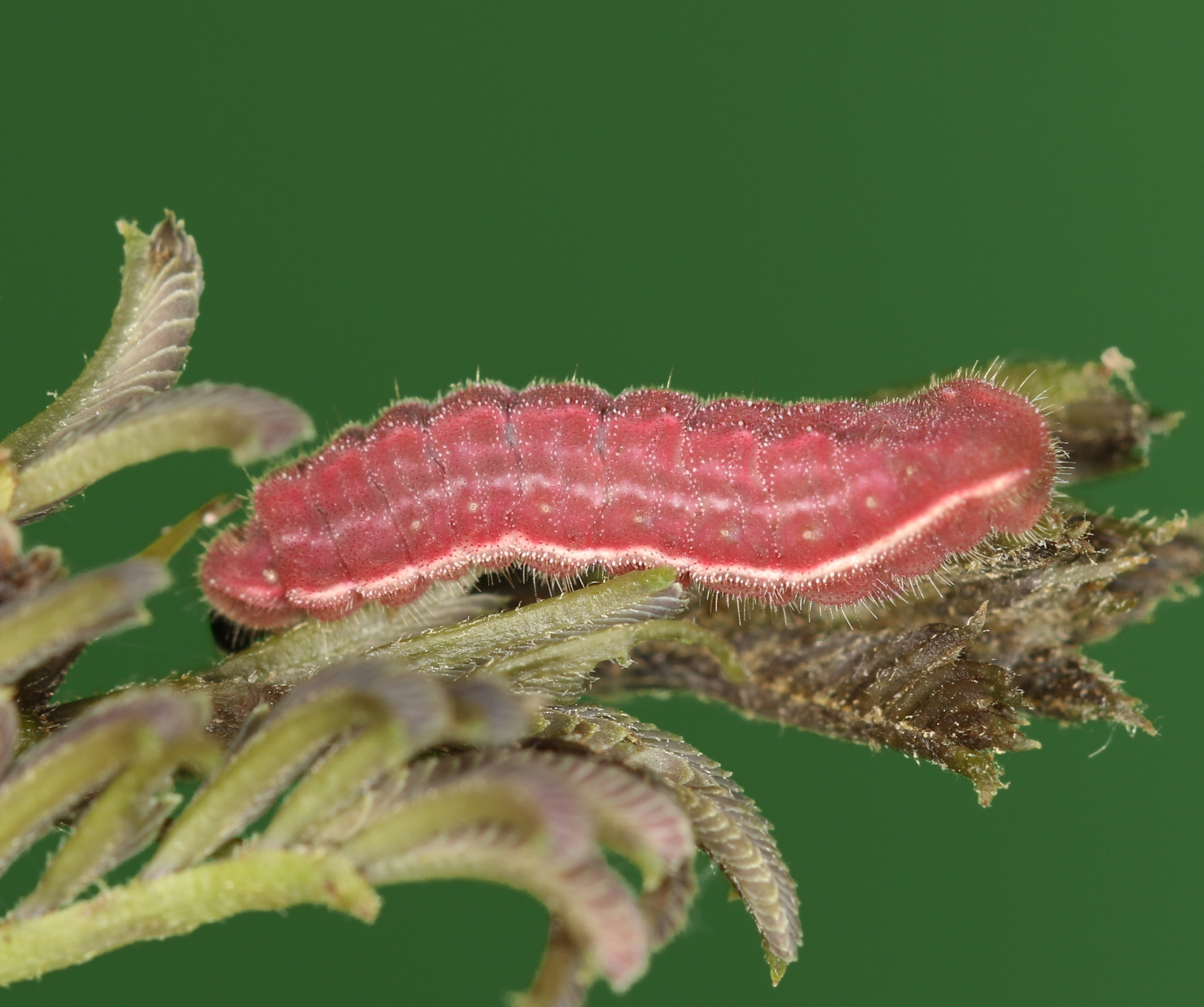
larva

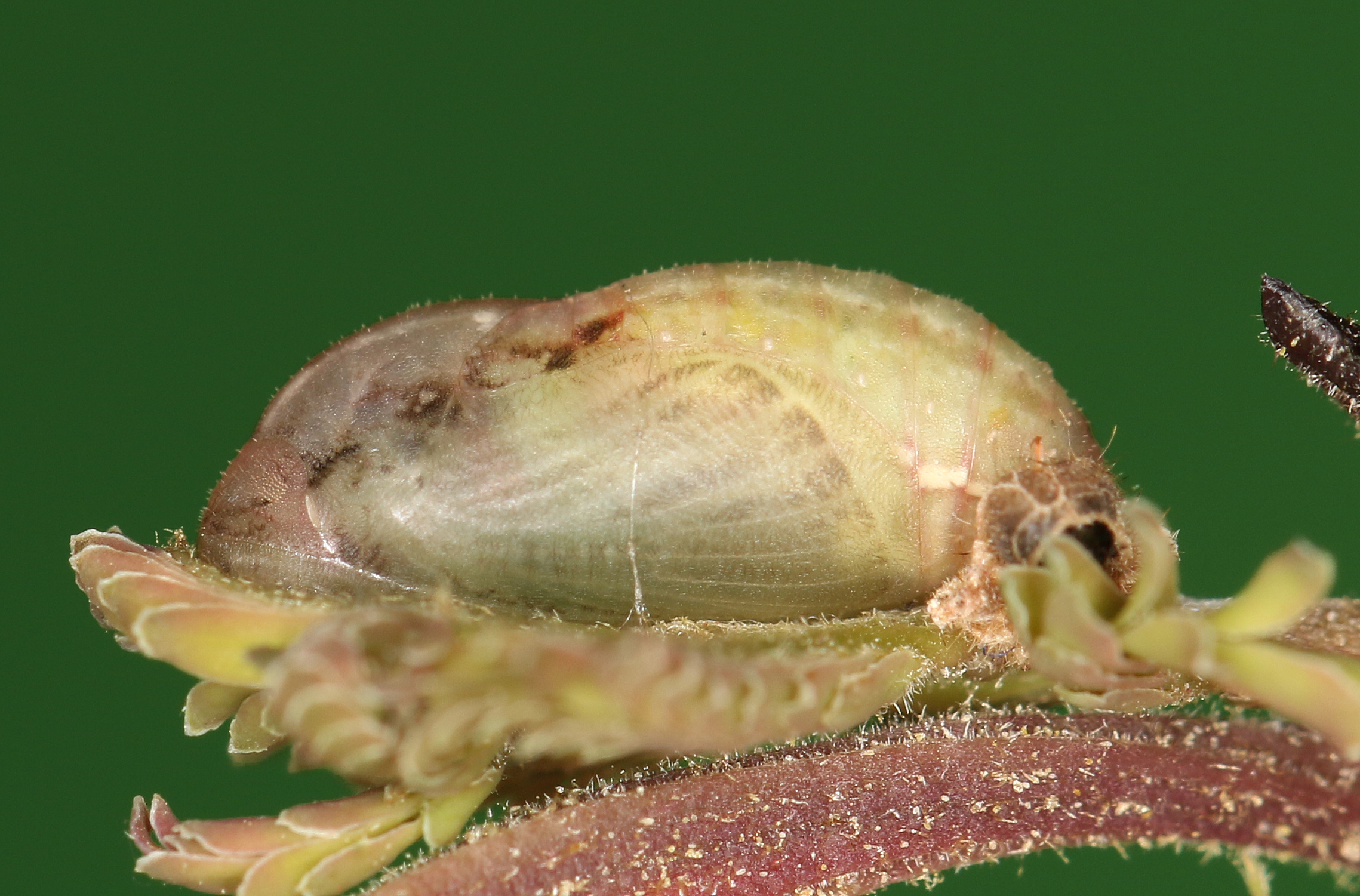
pupa

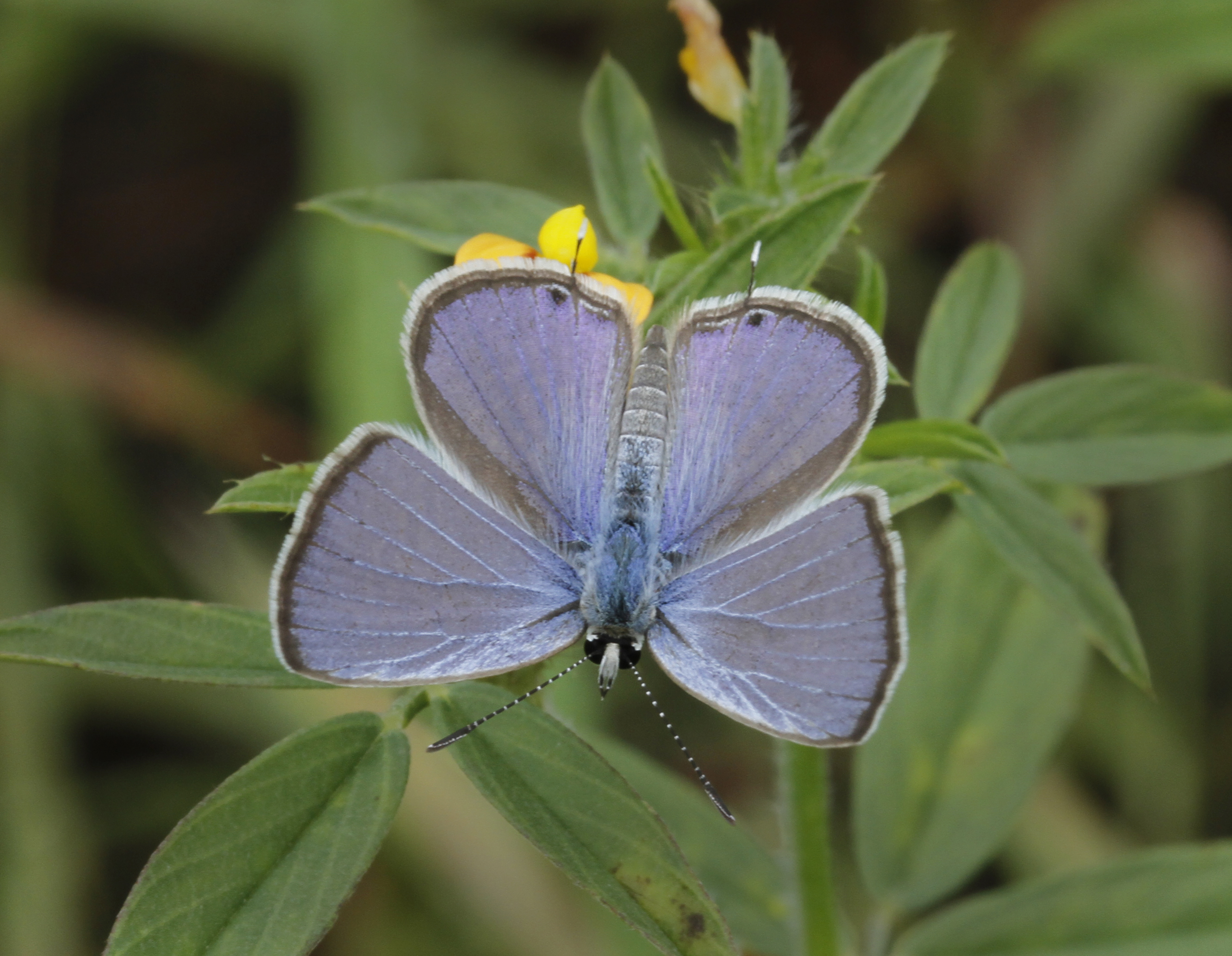
upper side (male)

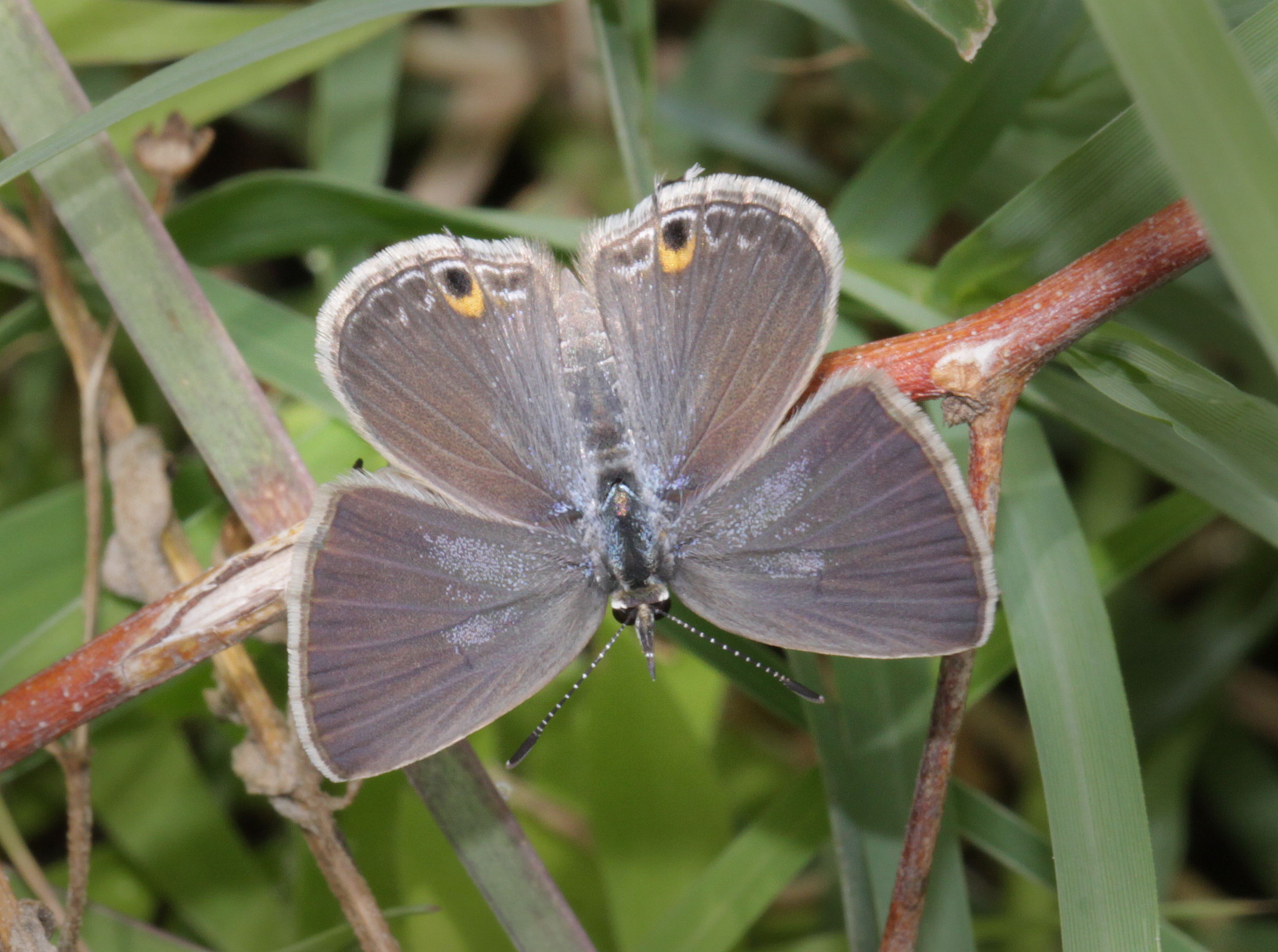
upper side (female)

== Subspecies ==
- Chilades parrhasius parrhasius (India)
- Chilades parrhasius nila Evans, 1925 (Sri Lanka)
- Chilades parrhasius minuta (Evans, 1932) (Pakistan)

== See also ==
- List of butterflies of India
- List of butterflies of India (Lycaenidae)

== Sources ==
- Evans, W.H. (1932). The Identification of Indian Butterflies (2nd ed.). Mumbai, India: Bombay Natural History Society.
- Gaonkar, Harish (1996). Butterflies of the Western Ghats, India (including Sri Lanka) - A Biodiversity Assessment of a Threatened Mountain System. Bangalore, India: Centre for Ecological Sciences.
- Gay, Thomas; Kehimkar, Isaac David; Punetha, Jagdish Chandra (1992). Common Butterflies of India. Nature Guides. Bombay, India: World Wide Fund for Nature-India by Oxford University Press. ISBN 978-0195631647.
- Haribal, Meena (1992). The Butterflies of Sikkim Himalaya and Their Natural History. Gangtok, Sikkim, India: Sikkim Nature Conservation Foundation.
- Kunte, Krushnamegh (2000). Butterflies of Peninsular India. India, A Lifescape. Hyderabad, India: Universities Press. ISBN 978-8173713545.
- Wynter-Blyth, Mark Alexander (1957). Butterflies of the Indian Region. Bombay, India: Bombay Natural History Society. ISBN 978-8170192329.
