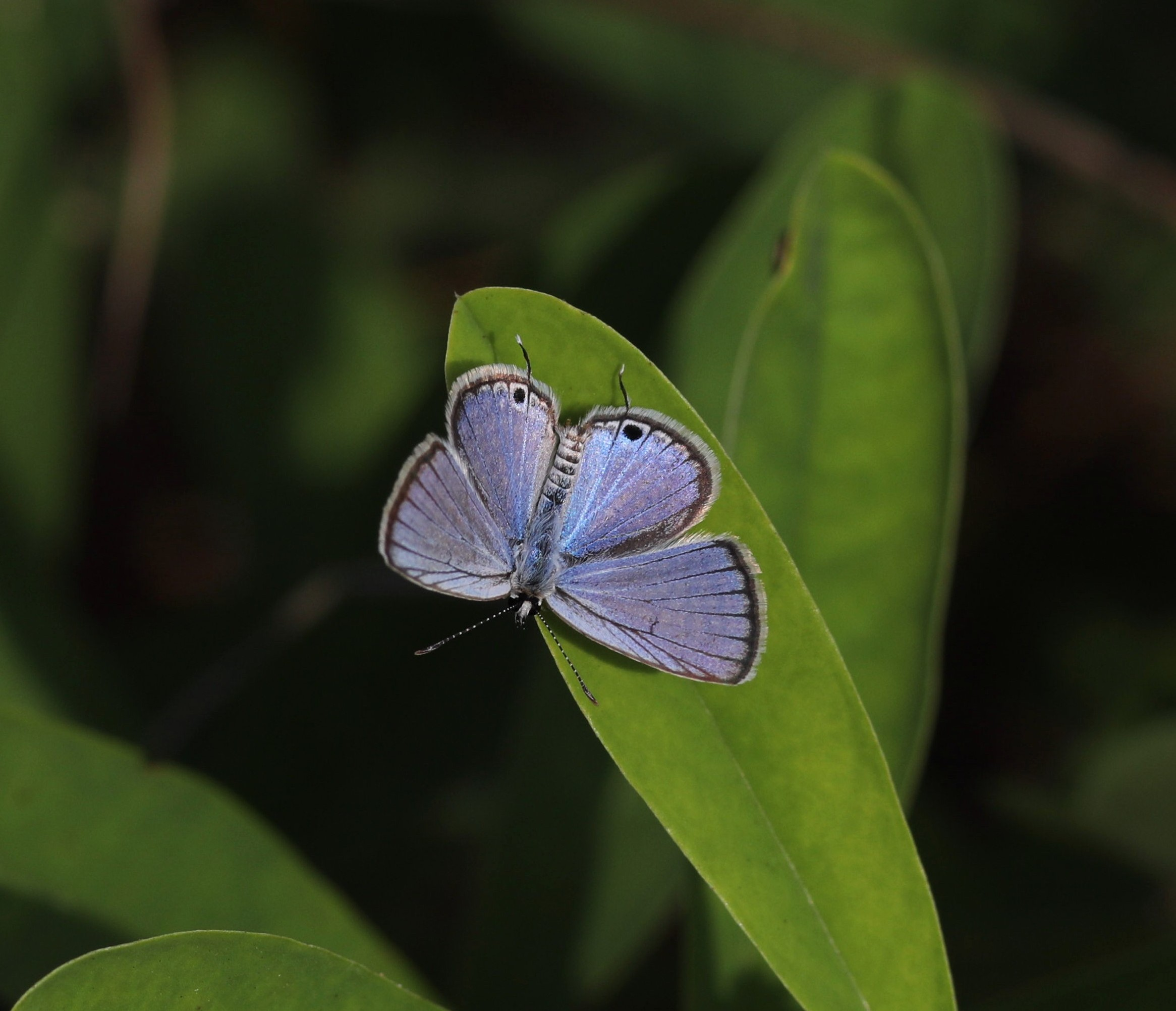

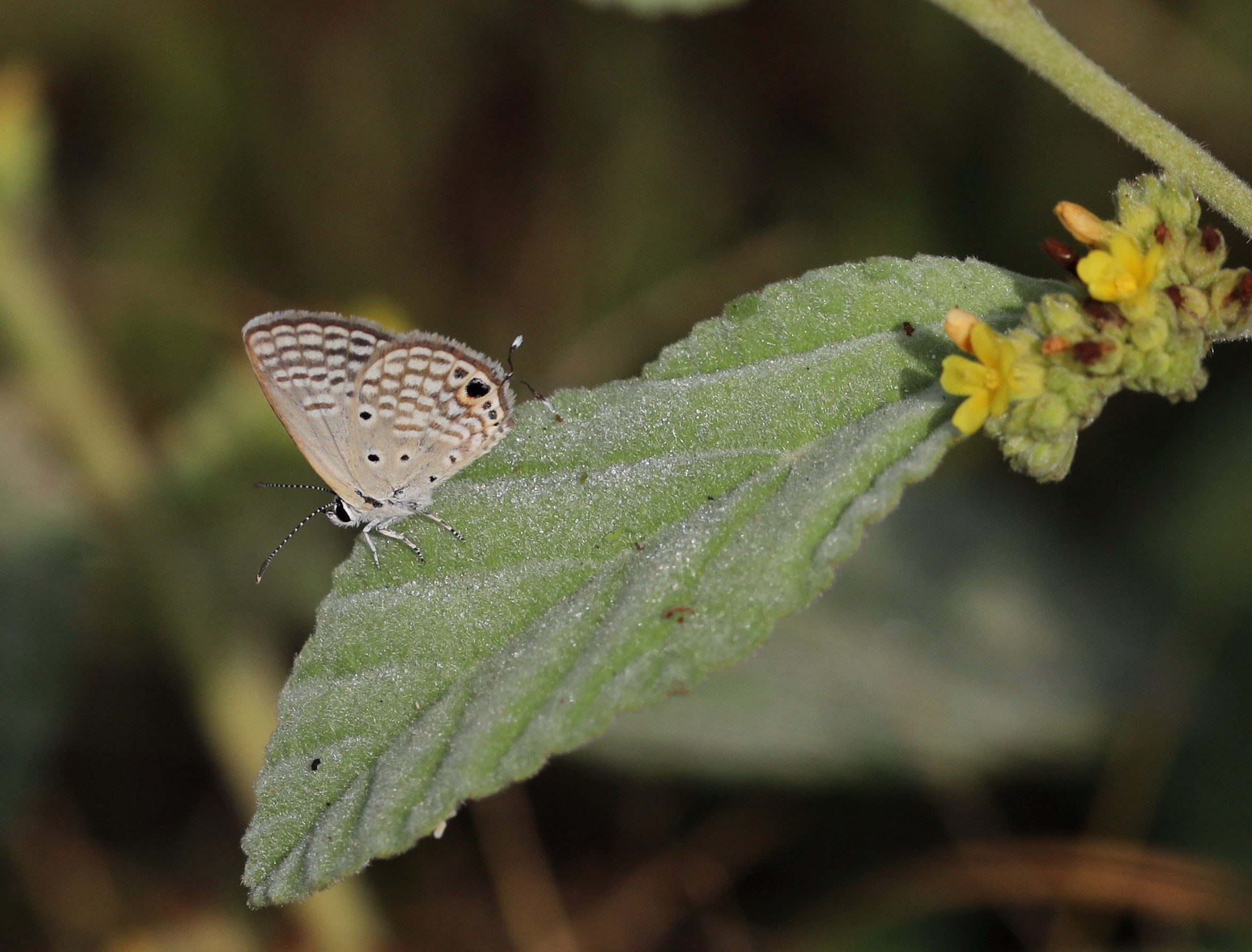

Scientific classification
- Kingdom: Animalia
- Phylum: Arthropoda
- Class: Insecta
- Order: Lepidoptera
- Family: Lycaenidae
- Genus: Chilades
- Species: C. eleusis

Binomial name
- Chilades eleusis (Demaison, 1888)

Synonyms
- Euchrysops eleusis Mabille, 1890; Lycaena podorina Mabille, 1890; Lycaena pharaonis Staudinger, 1894; Euchrysops nigeriae Sharpe, 1902; Cupido eleusis f. strigatus Aurivillius, 1925

= Chilades eleusis =

Sky-blue Cupid

Species of butterfly

Chilades eleusis, the sky-blue Cupid, is a butterfly in the family Lycaenidae. It is found in Senegal, the Gambia, Guinea-Bissau, Burkina Faso, northern Ghana, northern Nigeria, Niger, northern Cameroon, Chad, Sudan and Egypt. The habitat consists of dry habitats, Sudanian Savanna and the Sahel.

Adults feed from low-growing flowers.

The larvae feed on Acacia species.
