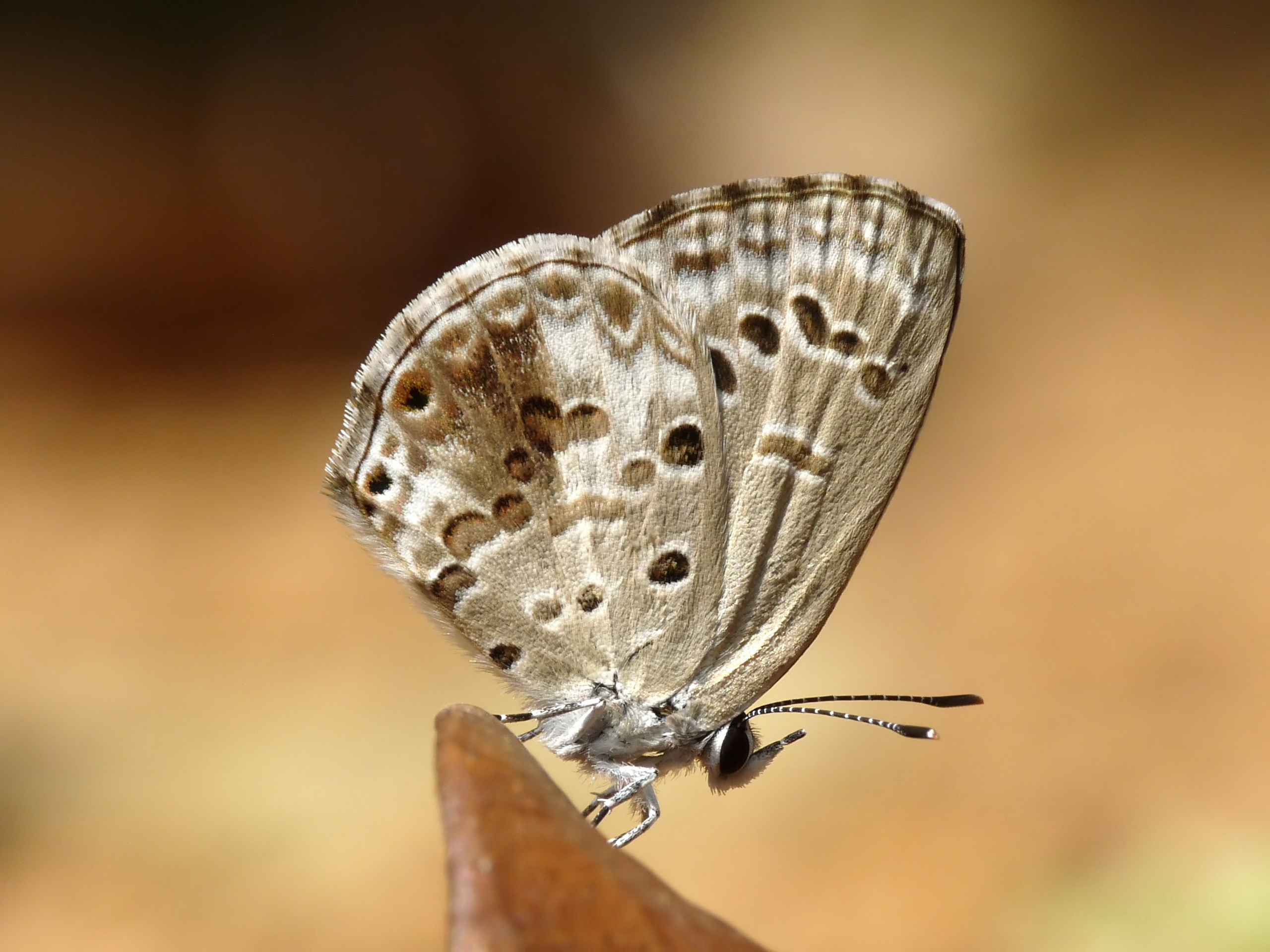
- Dry-season form

Scientific classification
- Domain: Eukaryota
- Kingdom: Animalia
- Phylum: Arthropoda
- Class: Insecta
- Order: Lepidoptera
- Family: Lycaenidae
- Genus: Chilades
- Species: C. lajus

Binomial name
- Chilades lajus (Stoll, [1780])

Synonyms
- Chilades laius (lapsus); Hesperia cajus Fabricius, 1793; Lycaena brahmina C. & R. Felder, [1865]; Polyommatus kandura Moore, [1866]

= Chilades lajus =

Lime blue

Species of butterfly

Chilades lajus, the lime blue, is a small butterfly found in India, Sri Lanka, Myanmar, Taiwan, Hong Kong, Hainan, Mangulam Island, Sulawesi and the Philippines that belongs to the lycaenids or blues family.

== Description ==
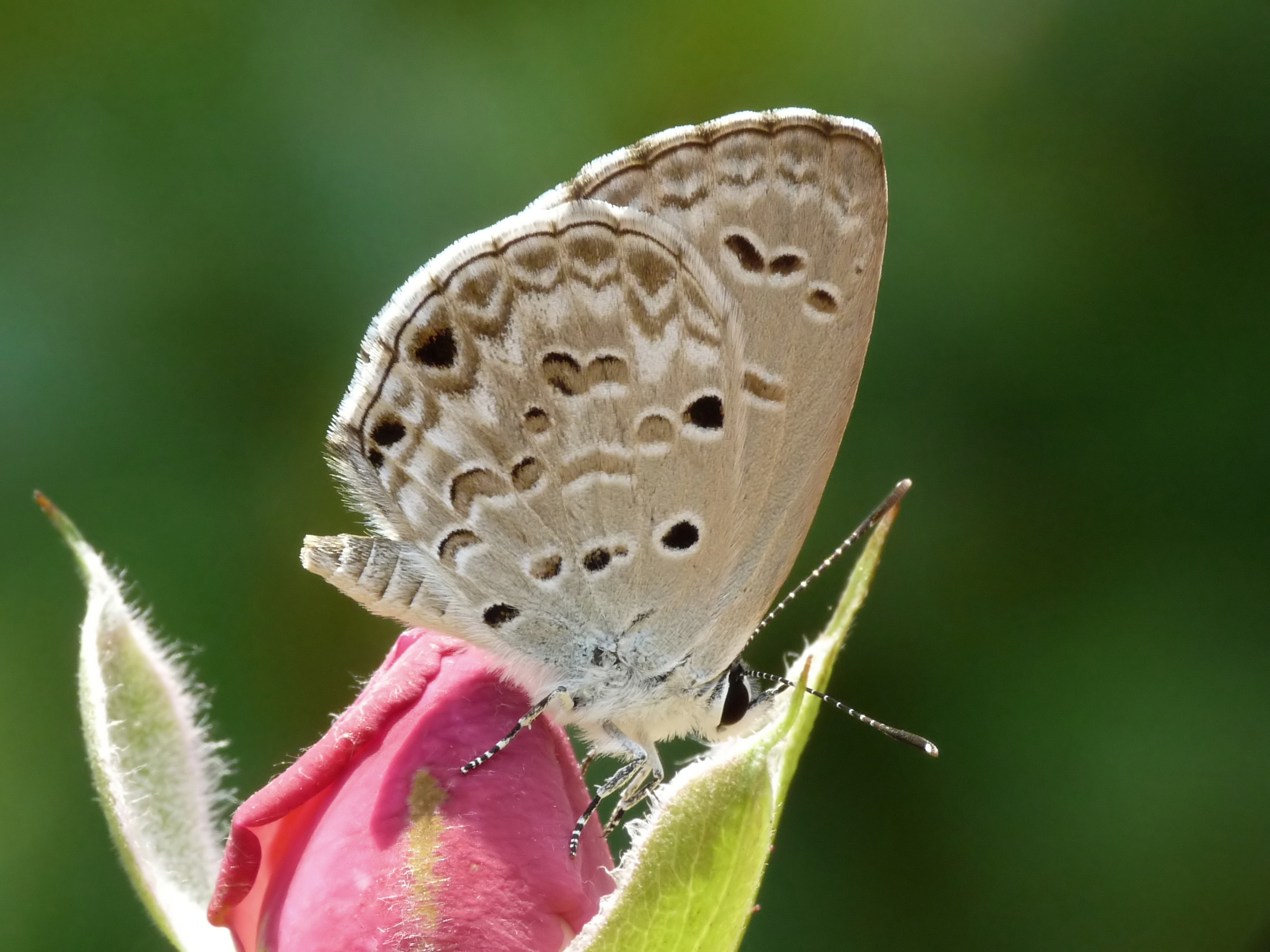
Wet-season form

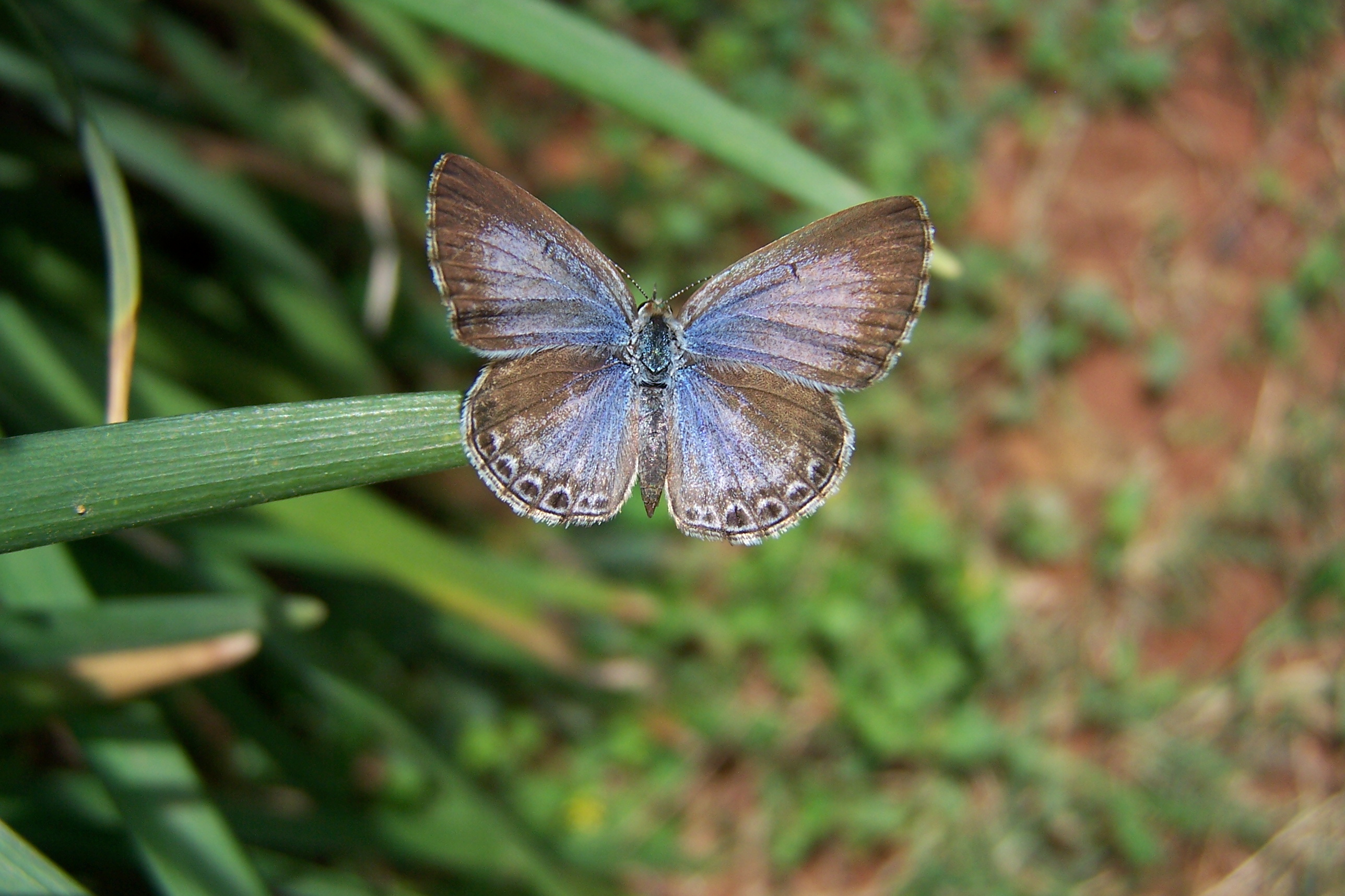
At Bangalore, Karnataka

Wet-season form: Male has a bluish-purple upperside. Forewing has base and basal half of costa flushed with pale blue; costa and termen edged by a slender dark brownish-block even line, beyond which along the termen the cilia are brown, at base, white outwardly. Hindwing: costa somewhat broadly dusky black; a slender black conspicuous anteciliary line, beyond which the cilia are white traversed medially by a brown line; dorsum broadly pale brown, two subterminal pale-bordered black spots in interspace 1, and one similar spot in interspace 2, often obsolescent and barely indicated.

Underside: grey. Forewing: a transverse broad lunule on the discocellulars and a transverse discal series of six spots dark brown, the lunule and each of the discal spots edged with white; the posterior four spots of the discal series elongate and each obliquely placed, the anterior two round and curved inwards; a subterminal series of transverse elongate spots with an inner series of lunules dusky brown, both series edged inwardly and outwardly with white; finally, an anteciliary slender black line. Cilia white, medially traversed by a dark brown line. Hindwing: the following jet-black spots slenderly encircled with white: a transverse subbasal series of four and a subcostal spot somewhat larger than the others in the middle of interspace 7; below the latter a catenulated (linked like a chain) line of slenderly white-edged dusky-brown spots, including the lunular spot on the discocellulars, crosses the wing, and beyond these opposite the apex of the cell are three similar discal spots, the middle one elongate; the terminal markings consist of an inner continuous subterminal series of dusky lunules, bordered inwardly and outwardly with white, an outer subterminal series of inwardly conical dusky-brown spots, and a slender anteciliary black line. The posterior two spots of the outer line of subterminal markings are also black. Cilia white. Antennae black, the shafts obscurely ringed with white; head, thorax and abdomen brown, the head, thorax and base of the abdomen with a little blue scaling; beneath: the palpi, thorax and abdomen white.

Female upperside: dark brown. Forewings and hindwings from their bases outwards to a varying extent shot with bright iridescent blue, this colour not extended on either wing to the costa, termen or dorsum. Hindwing: in addition a curved postdiscal series of whitish lunules very often obsolescent, in some specimens entirely wanting; followed by a subterminal series of black, narrowly white-encircled spots that are often obscure and in some specimens do not reach the apex. Anteciliary black lines and cilia as in the male. Underside: precisely similar to that of the male. Antennae, head, thorax and abdomen as in the male.

Dry-season form: Closely resemble specimens of the wet-season brood, but can always be distinguished by the somewhat paler ground colour of the upperside, while on the underside both sexes bear a large nebulous brown patch on the hindwing posteriorly. Sometimes the ground colour on the underside is much paler, almost white, especially in the female.

== Larva ==
Food plants include Glycosmis arborea. "Pale green at all stages, on the shade or the young leaves of the lime and pummelo bushes on which it feeds. When full-grown it is about seven-sixteenths of an inch in length, onisciform as usual; the head "black, smooth and shining, with a somewhat dark green dorsal line down the body, the whole surface but very slightly shagreened and covered with extremely fine and short downy hairs. The constriction between the segments slight. There are traces of two pale subdorsal lines, and there is a pale lateral line below the spiracles. The usual extensile organ on the twelfth segment short. This larva has no distinctive markings by which it can be easily recognized; it is altogether a very plainly coloured and marked insert. I have found it common in Calcutta during the rains, the ant which attends it betraying its presence. The latter has been identified by Dr. A. Forel as Camponotus rubripes, Drury (sylvaticus Fabr.), subspecies conpressus, Fabr." (Lionel de Nicéville quoted in Bingham)

== Pupa ==
"Green; of the usual Lycaenid shape, with a dorsal and lateral series of somewhat obscure conjoined brownish spots on the upperside. Attached to the underside of the leaves of its food-plant in the usual manner." (de Nicéville.)

== Gallery ==
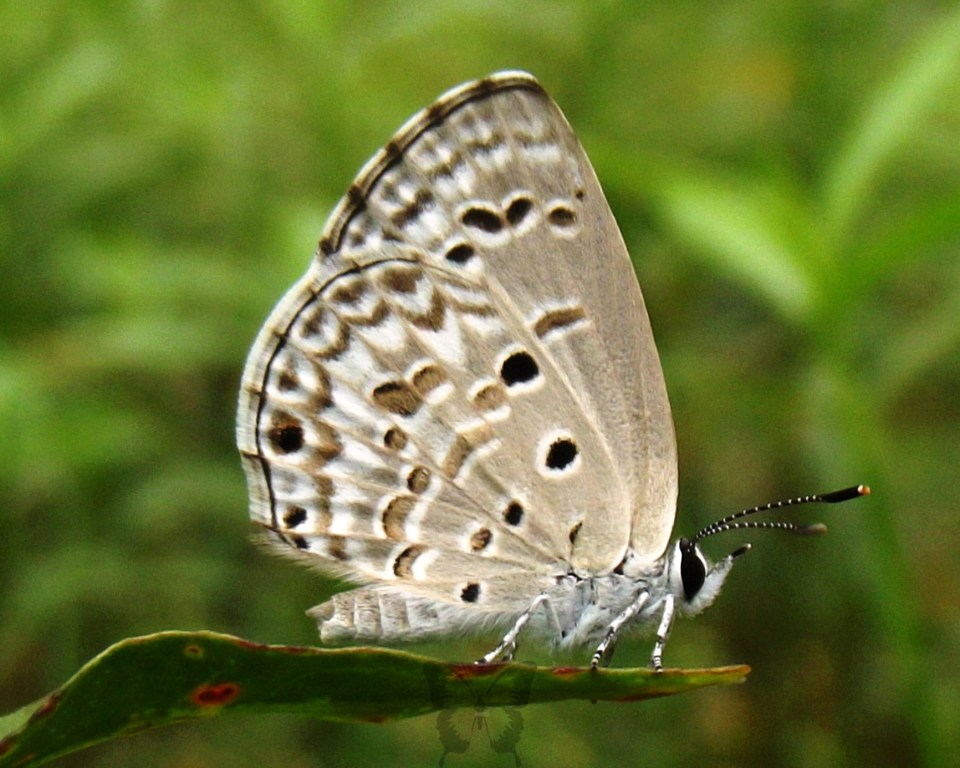
Wet-season at Cherthala, Alappuzha, Kerala, India

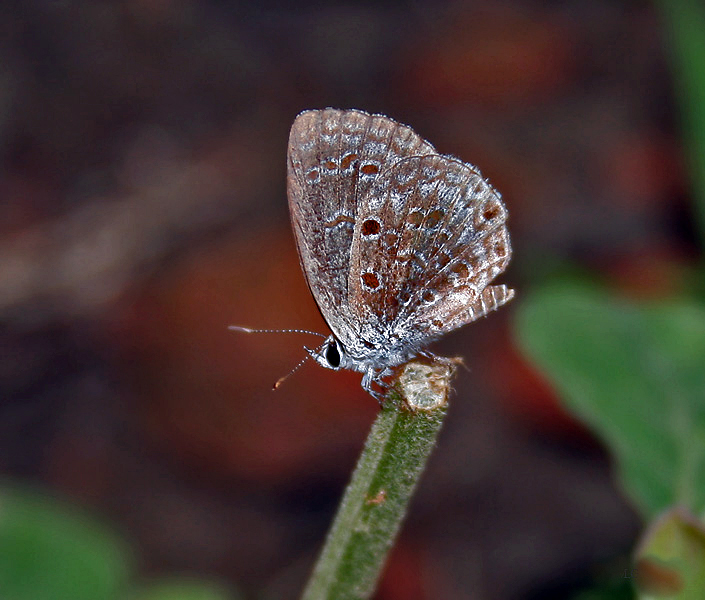
Wet-season brood at Bracebridge, Kolkata, India

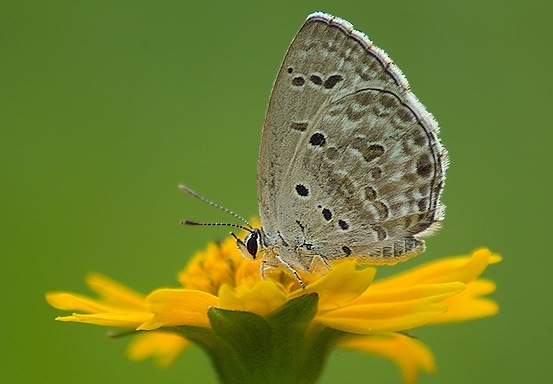

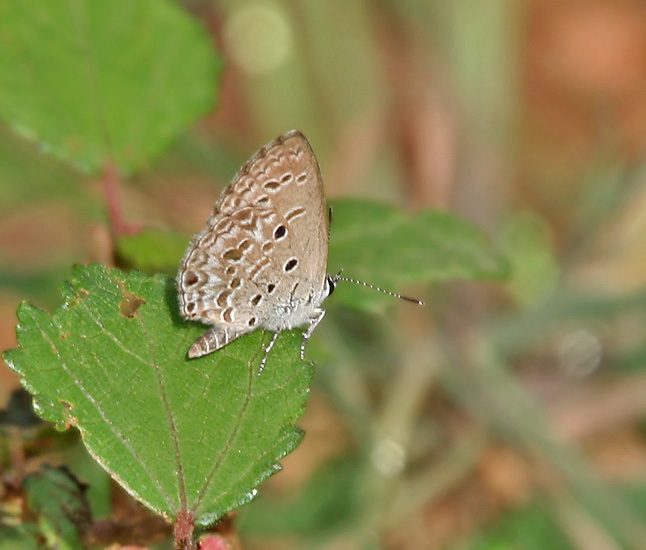
Wet-season brood at Talakona forest, in Chittoor district of Andhra Pradesh, India

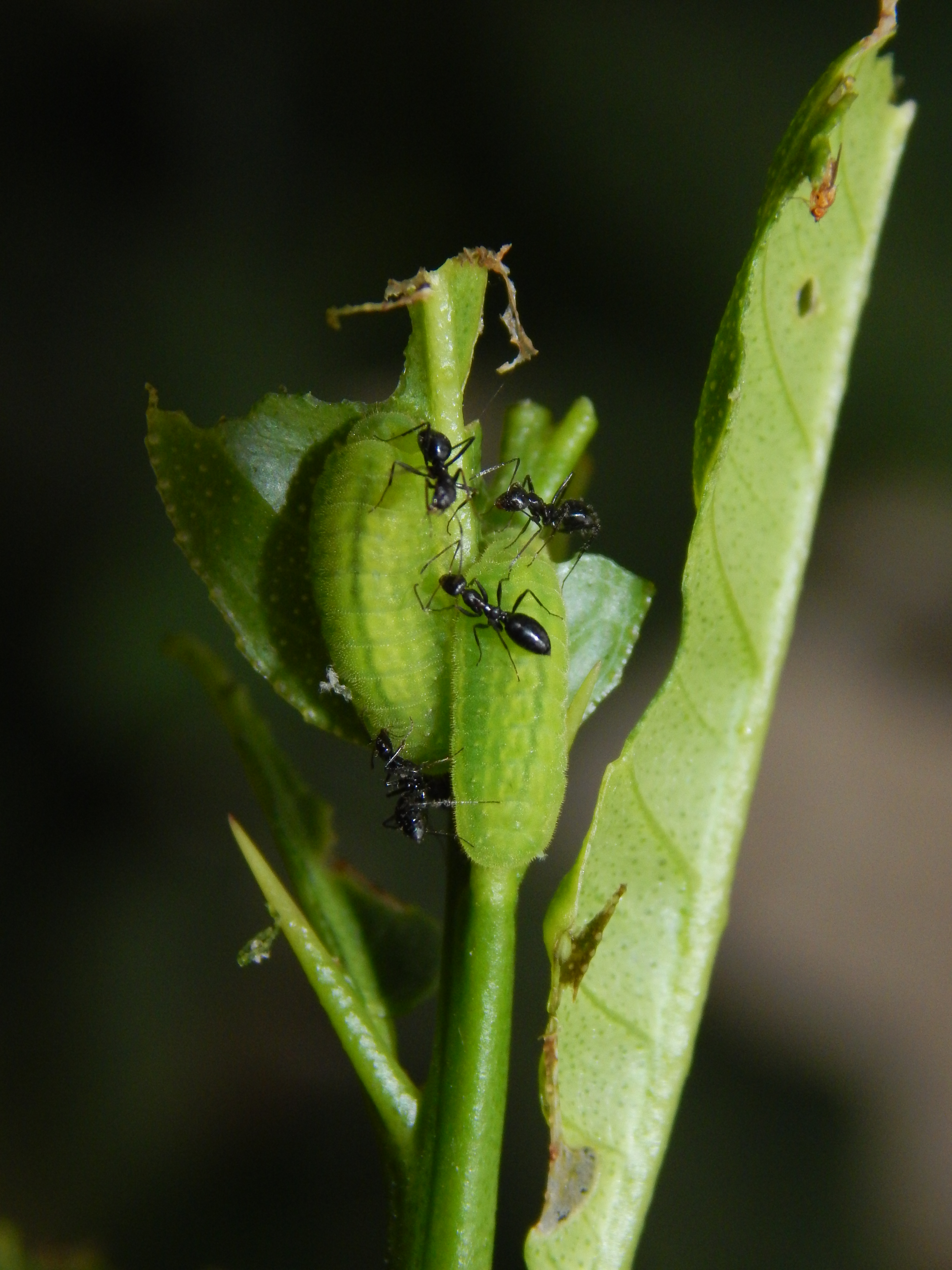
Larva

== See also ==
- List of butterflies of India
- List of butterflies of India (Lycaenidae)
