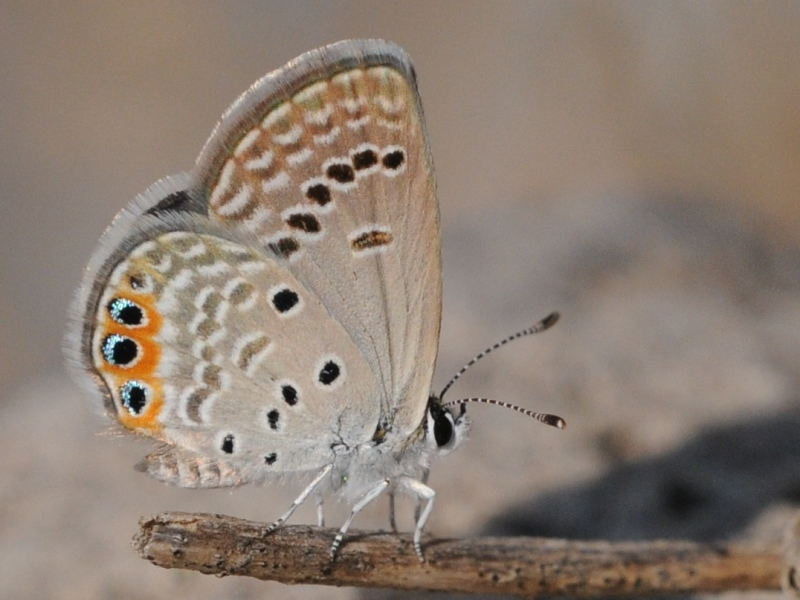

Scientific classification
- Kingdom: Animalia
- Phylum: Arthropoda
- Clade: Pancrustacea
- Class: Insecta
- Order: Lepidoptera
- Family: Lycaenidae
- Genus: Freyeria
- Species: F. trochylus

Binomial name
- Freyeria trochylus (Freyer, 1845)

Synonyms
- Lycaena trochylus Freyer, 1845; Chilades trochylus (Freyer, 1845); Lycaena parva Murray, 1874; Chilades trochylus var. grisea Aiger-Abafi, 1906; Chilades trochilus (lapsus)

= Freyeria trochylus =

Grass jewel

Species of butterfly

Freyeria trochylus, the grass jewel, is a small butterfly found in Africa, Arabia (United Arab Emirates, Oman, Saudi Arabia), southern Europe (Bulgaria and Greece), India and southern Asia that belongs to the lycaenids or blues family.

== Description ==
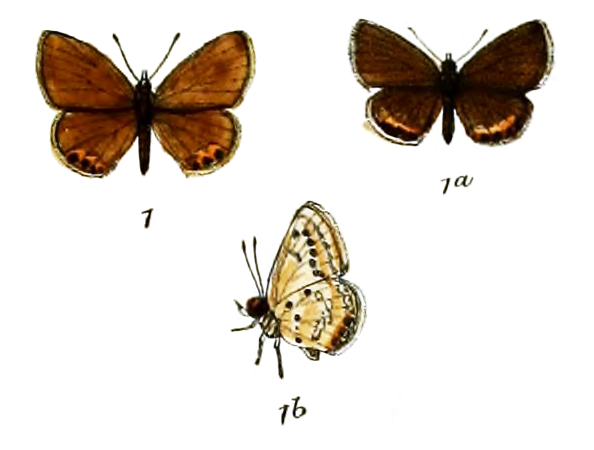
Freyeria trochylus (Lepidoptera Indica)

Male upperside: brown, somewhat variable in tint. Specimens from dry localities are much paler than those taken in areas with a comparatively heavy rainfall.

Forewing: uniform, with a very ill-defined anteciliary dark line in some specimens. Hindwing: a subterminal series of round black spots crowned with pale ochraceous, the posterior four spots generally well defined and outwardly edged with white, the anterior spots obsolescent and without the interior edging of yellow or the outer edging of white; a well-marked, slender anteciliary black line. Cilia white, basal halves brown.

Underside: pale silky brown. Forewing: with the following white markings: a short line on the inner and outer sides of the discocellulars; a transverse, slightly curved, discal series of small, more or less incomplete rings; a transverse postdiscal series of disconnected slender lunules; a subterminal series of similar but more regular lunules and a terminal broken line, followed by a dark unbroken anteciliary line; the ground colour between the two short discocellular lines, that enclosed within each ring of the discal markings, and between the subterminal lunules and the terminal line slightly darker than on the rest of the wing. Hindwing: two short white lines on the discocellulars; the discal, postdiscal and terminal markings as on the forewing, except that enclosed between the subterminal series of white lunules and the terminal white line is a complete series of dark spots, the posterior three or four jet-black sprinkled outwardly with metallic-green scales and encircled with pale ochraceous. In addition there are a transverse subbasal series of four white-encircled black spots and a similar subcostal spot in middle of interspace 7. Antennae, head, thorax and abdomen brown, the shaft of the antenna speckled with white; beneath: palpi, thorax and abdomen white.

Female upperside and undersides: ground colour and markings as in the male, but the latter larger and more clearly defined; on the hindwing the yellow crowning the black spots on the tornal area on the upperside and surrounding the same on the underside, wider and more prominent. Antennae, head, thorax and abdomen as in the male.

== Larva ==
"When full-grown a little over a quarter of an inch in length, onisciform as usual; the head very small, black and shining, entirely hidden when at rest, being covered by the second segment; the colour of the body grass-green, with a dark green dorsal line from the third to the twelfth segment; two subdorsal series of short parallel streaks, each pair being divided from the next by the segmental constriction, these streaks paler than the ground-colour; an almost pure white lateral line below the spiracles, which is the most conspicuous of all the markings; the segmental constrictions rather deep; the whole surface of the body shagreened, being covered with very small whitish tubercles, from which spring very fine short colourless hair's. The usual extensile organ on the twelfth segment. Dr. George King, Superintendent of the Royal Botanical Gardens, Sibpur, near Calcutta, has identified its food-plant as Heliotropium strigosum, Willd. Professor A. Forel identifies the ant as Pheidole quadrispinosa, Jerdon." (de Nicéville quoted by Bingham)

Other food plants noted include Goniogyna hirta.

== Pupa ==
"About three-sixteenths of an inch in length, pale green, of the usual Lycaenid shape, densely covered everywhere, except on the wing-cases, with somewhat long white hairs." (de Nicéville.)

Torben Larsen developed a species numbering system for his 2005 publication Butterflies of West Africa. This species is #634. The 'Larsen' numbers have since been used with permission in A Sharp Eye on Butterflies of Ghana.

== See also ==
- List of butterflies of India (Lycaenidae)
