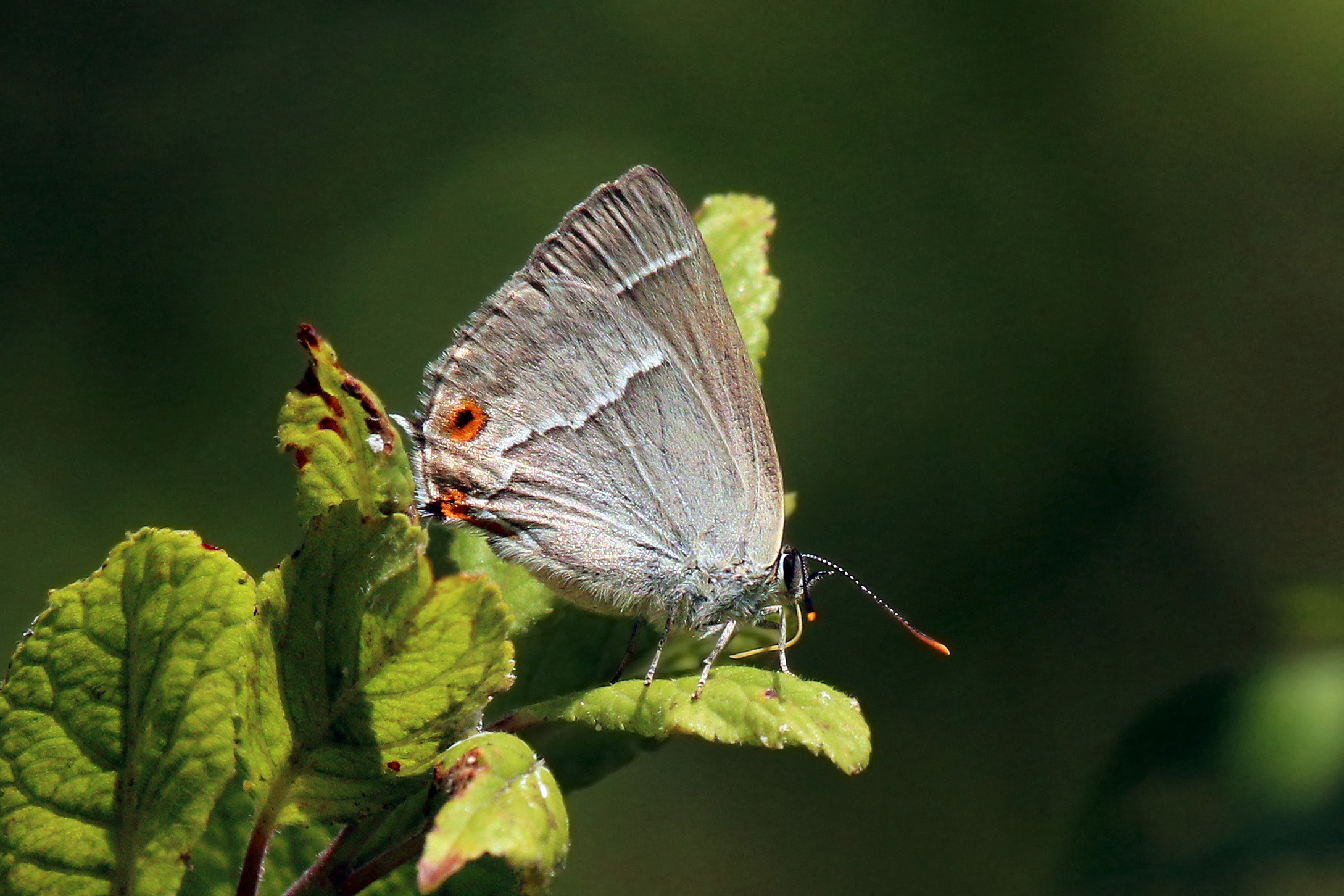
- Female underside Whitecross Green Wood, Oxfordshire

Scientific classification
- Kingdom: Animalia
- Phylum: Arthropoda
- Class: Insecta
- Order: Lepidoptera
- Family: Lycaenidae
- Genus: Favonius
- Species: F. quercus

Binomial name
- Favonius quercus (Linnaeus, 1758)

Synonyms
- Bithys quercus subsp. interjecta Verity, 1919; Favonia quercus (Linnaeus, 1758); Neozephyrus quercus (Linnaeus, 1758); Neozephyrus quercus subsp. interjecta (Verity, 1919); Neozephyrus quercus subsp. quercus; Papilio quercus Linnaeus, 1758; Quercusia quercus (Linnaeus, 1758); Quercusia quercus subsp. bellus (Gerhard, 1853); Quercusia quercus subsp. caerulea (Schwingenschuss, 1953); Quercusia quercus subsp. depuncta (Lempke, 1955); Quercusia quercus subsp. iberica (Staudinger, 1901); Quercusia quercus subsp. infraflavomaculata (Lempke, 1955); Quercusia quercus subsp. inframaculata (Lempke, 1955); Quercusia quercus subsp. interjecta (Verity, 1919); Quercusia quercus subsp. longicauda (Riley, 1921); Quercusia quercus subsp. quercus; Quercusia quercus subsp. violacea (Niepelt, 1914); Ruralis quercus (Linnaeus, 1758); Thecla quercus (Linnaeus, 1758); Thecla quercus subsp. bellus Gerhard, 1853; Zephyrus iberica Staudinger, 1901; Zephyrus quercus (Linnaeus, 1758); Zephyrus quercus subsp. caerulea Schwingenschuss, 1953

= Purple hairstreak =

- Male; Alners Gorse, Dorset

Species of butterfly

The purple hairstreak (Favonius quercus) is a butterfly in the family Lycaenidae distributed throughout much of Europe, North Africa, Anatolia, Caucasia, and Transcaucasia. The larva feeds on Quercus robur, Quercus petraea, Quercus cerris and Quercus ilex.

== Subspecies ==
- F. quercus quercus (Linnaeus, 1758) - widespread
- F. quercus iberica (Staudinger, 1901) - Morocco, Algeria, Iberia
- F. quercus interjectus (Verity, 1919) - Italy
- F. quercus longicaudatus (Riley, 1921) - Armenia, Azerbaijan, Turkey, West Iran

== Description in Seitz ==
Z. quercus L. (74 c, d). male above with a blue gloss and narrow black distal border, the female with the basal area of the forewing blue and often the cell of the hindwing bluish. Underside leaden-grey, with a proximally dark-edged white line before the outer third and in the anal area of the hindwing weak yellow spots. ab. obsoleta Tutt are females without any blue gloss; there occur also transitional specimens with the blue reduced (semiobsoleta). ab. pallescens Tutt are males with a pale grey greenish instead of blue gloss. In ab. excessus Tutt the hindmargin of the forewing bears a coppery streak. Courvoisier proposes the name ab. latefasciata for specimens with broader white line on the underside, ab. bellus Gerh. (74 d) are females with small orange spots at the apex of the cell of the forewing, which are reduced to two spots in ab. bipunctatus Tutt and to one in ab. unipunctus Tutt. Widely distributed, occurring throughout Europe and Asia Minor from England and the Atlantic coast to Armenia and from North Europe to the Mediterranean — Beyond the Mediterranean Sea and on the Iberian Peninsula there occurs iberica Stgr. (74 d).Larger, above very dark, the blue area of the male very sharply defined but not very extended. Underside paler silvery grey, the whitish line therefore being less prominent. — Egg semiglobular, whitish grey, granulose. The larva, which is already developed in the summer, does not leave the egg before April; it bores into the young shoots and later lies on the young leaves, especially on those of the lower twigs of old oak-trees. It is a dreadful cannibal and is evidently avoided by insect-eating birds, as it has been found unmolested in the nest of the blue tit containing young birds (Bingham-Newland). On the other hand it is much infested with ichneumons, as well as a species of Tachina, which develops after the pupation of the caterpillar (Steinfert). Adult yellowish brown with a reddish tint, on the back a row of triangles connected by a dark line, the sides greenish. On various species of oak, and said to occur also on other plants (Myrica, etc.); adult in July. The pupa rounded, brown, irregularly spotted with blackish, on the back three rows of dark spots. The butterflies occur from June till August everywhere in the plains and hills, but usually singly, in certain years more plentifully. They rest on the outer twigs of oak-bushes with the wings always closed, but sometimes flutter high up about the crowns of old oaks.

== Appearance, behaviour and distribution (British Isles) ==
This active little butterfly is most often seen fluttering around high up in oak trees on warm sunny July and early August days. Males have a glossy purple sheen on the upperside, females have two patches on the forewing only. The underside is light grey with a white streak, edged in black, running down the middle of both wings. The hindwings have a short tail with two orange spots at the base on the underside. It is common and widespread across southern and central England and Wales, becoming rarer and more isolated in the north as far as central Scotland. In Ireland it occurs in a few isolated colonies scattered across the country but is probably still under recorded due to its reclusive habits. Males tend to stay high up in trees, females come down to lower levels to lay eggs. Both sexes feed mainly on honeydew although females are occasionally attracted to flowers whilst taking a break from egg laying.

== Life cycle and foodplants ==
Eggs are laid singly at the base of oak buds in late summer ready to hatch the following spring as the buds break. Both sessile oak Quercus petraea and pedunculate oak Quercus robur, Britain's two native oaks are used and also some introduced species such as Turkey oak Quercus cerris and evergreen oak Quercus ilex. In winter the eggs are easily found on close examination of bare branches. The caterpillar is fully developed inside the egg after two or three weeks but doesn't hatch until the spring whereupon it burrows into the flower buds to feed safely concealed. As it gets larger and the buds open it spins a silken retreat and feeds only at night. Pupation usually takes place in the leaf litter where it is tended by ants who bury them, but also sometimes in a crevice in the bark of the foodplant. There is one brood a year with adults on the wing in July and August.

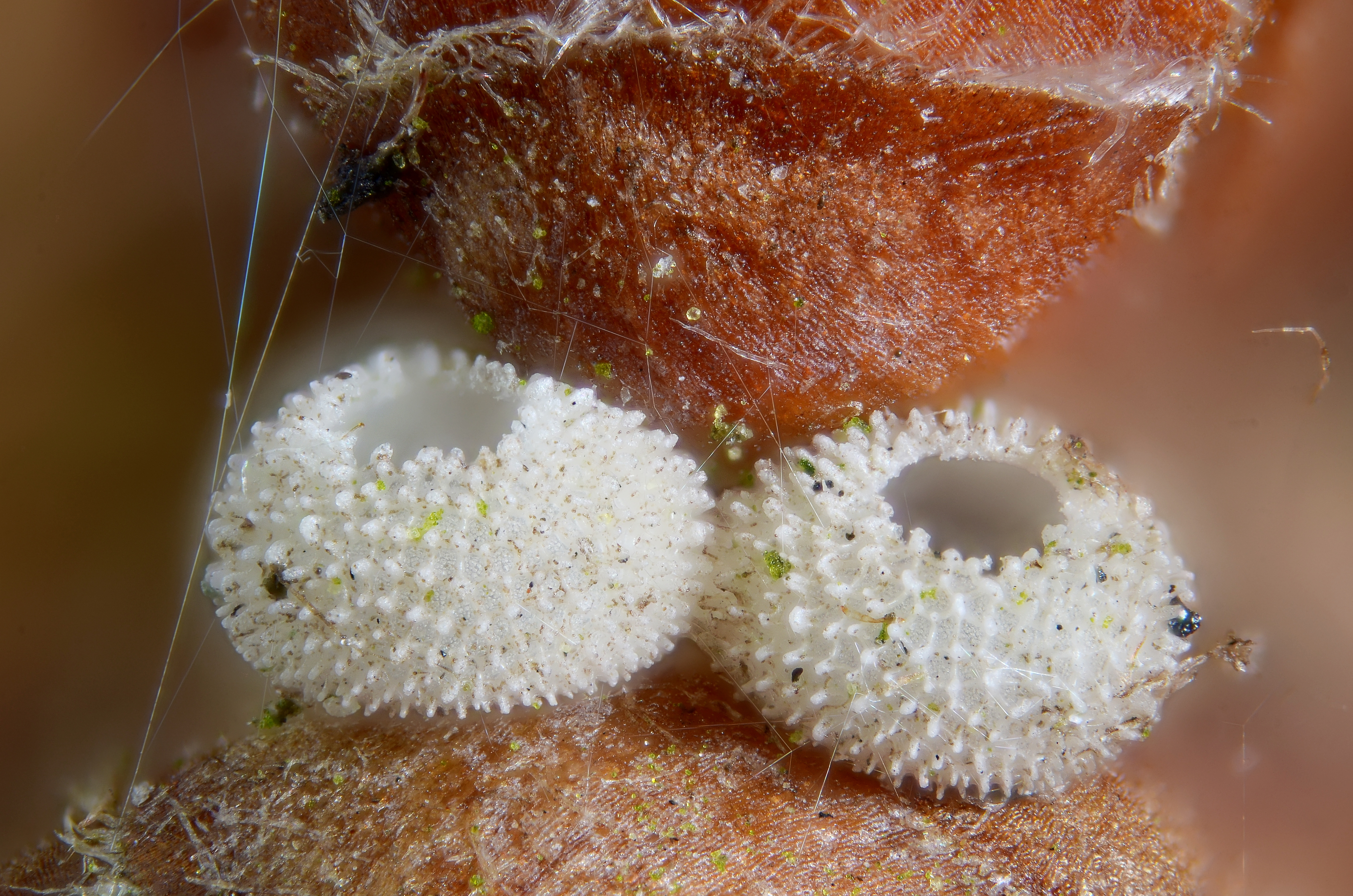
Eggs

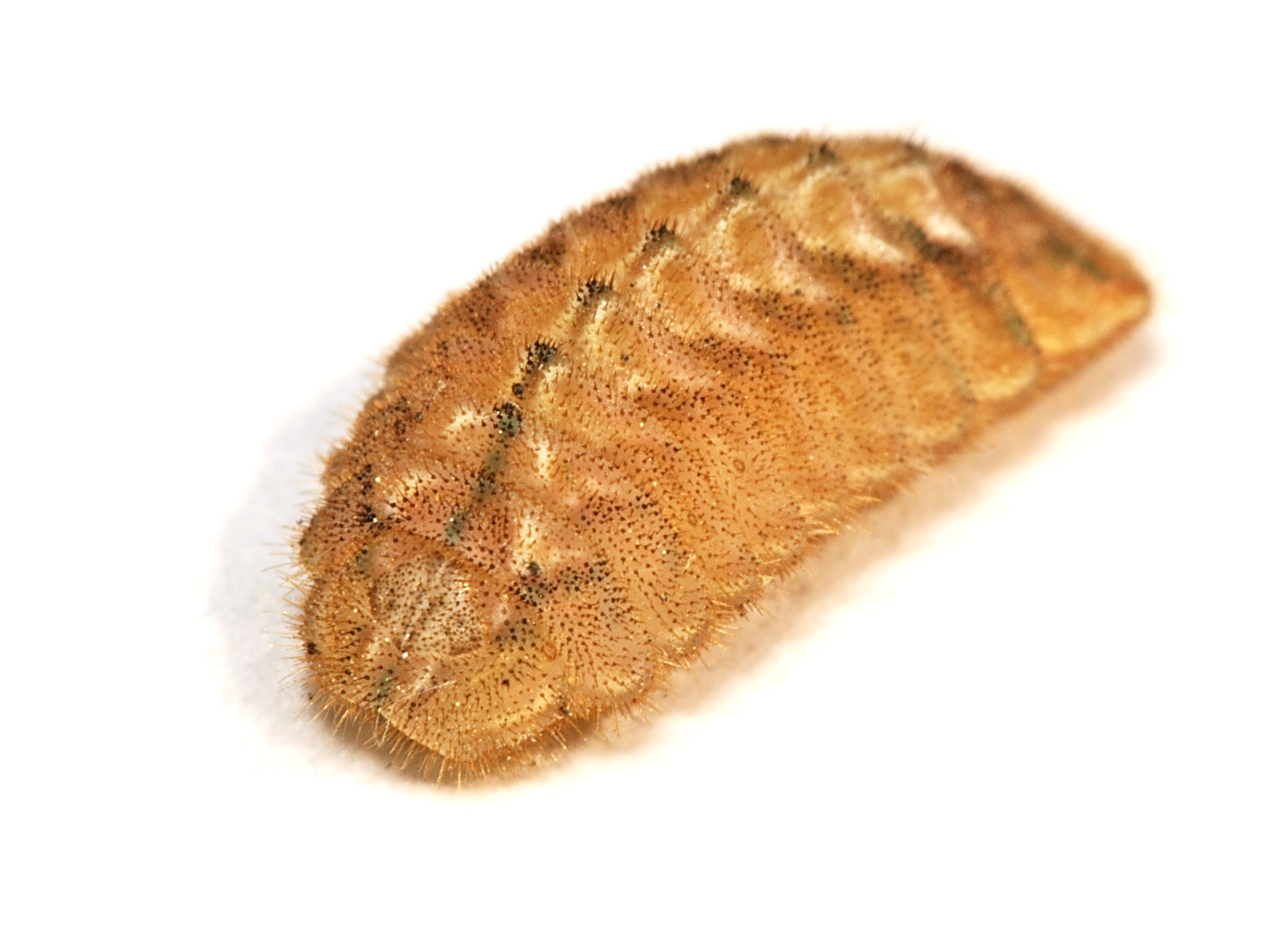
Caterpillar

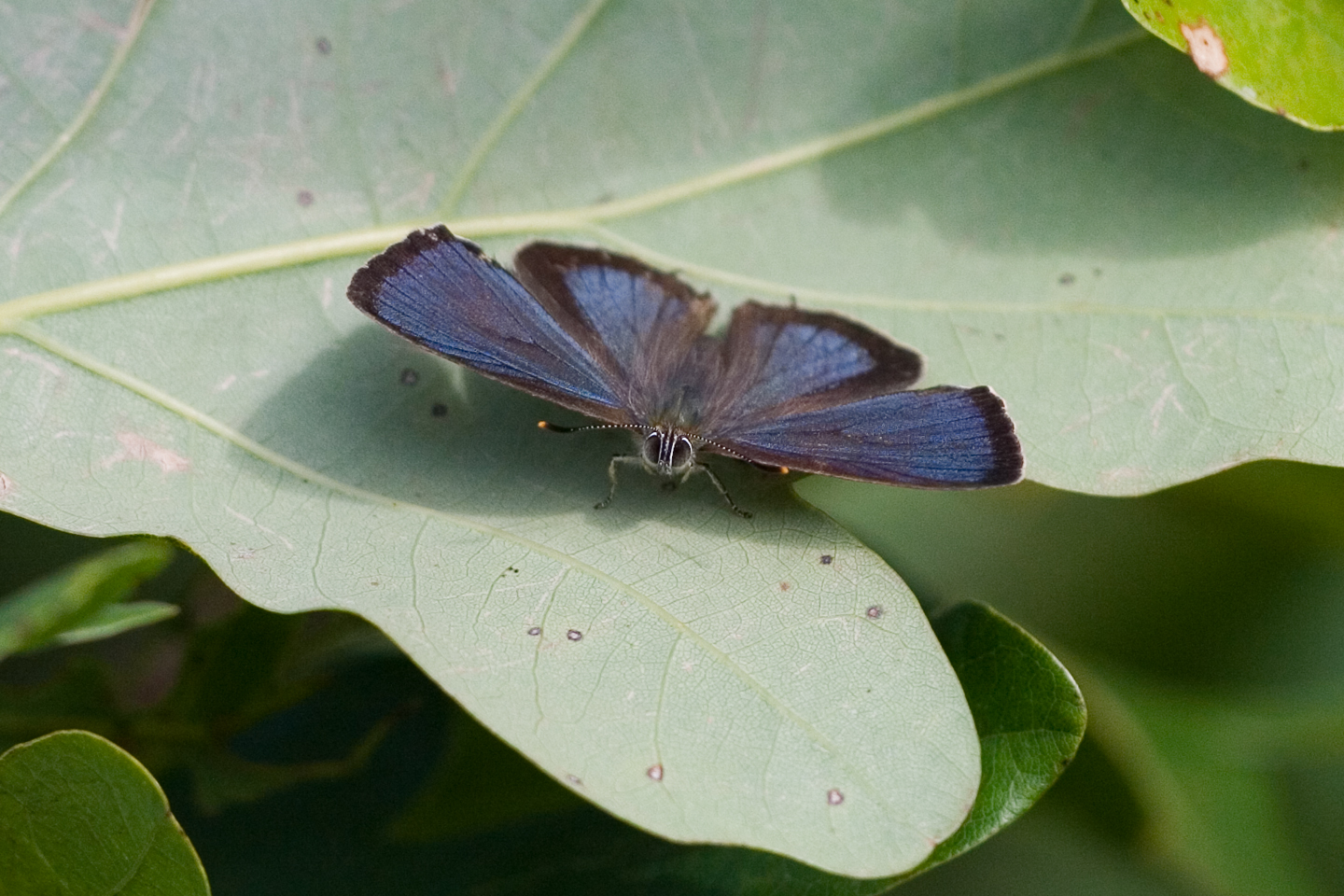
Male

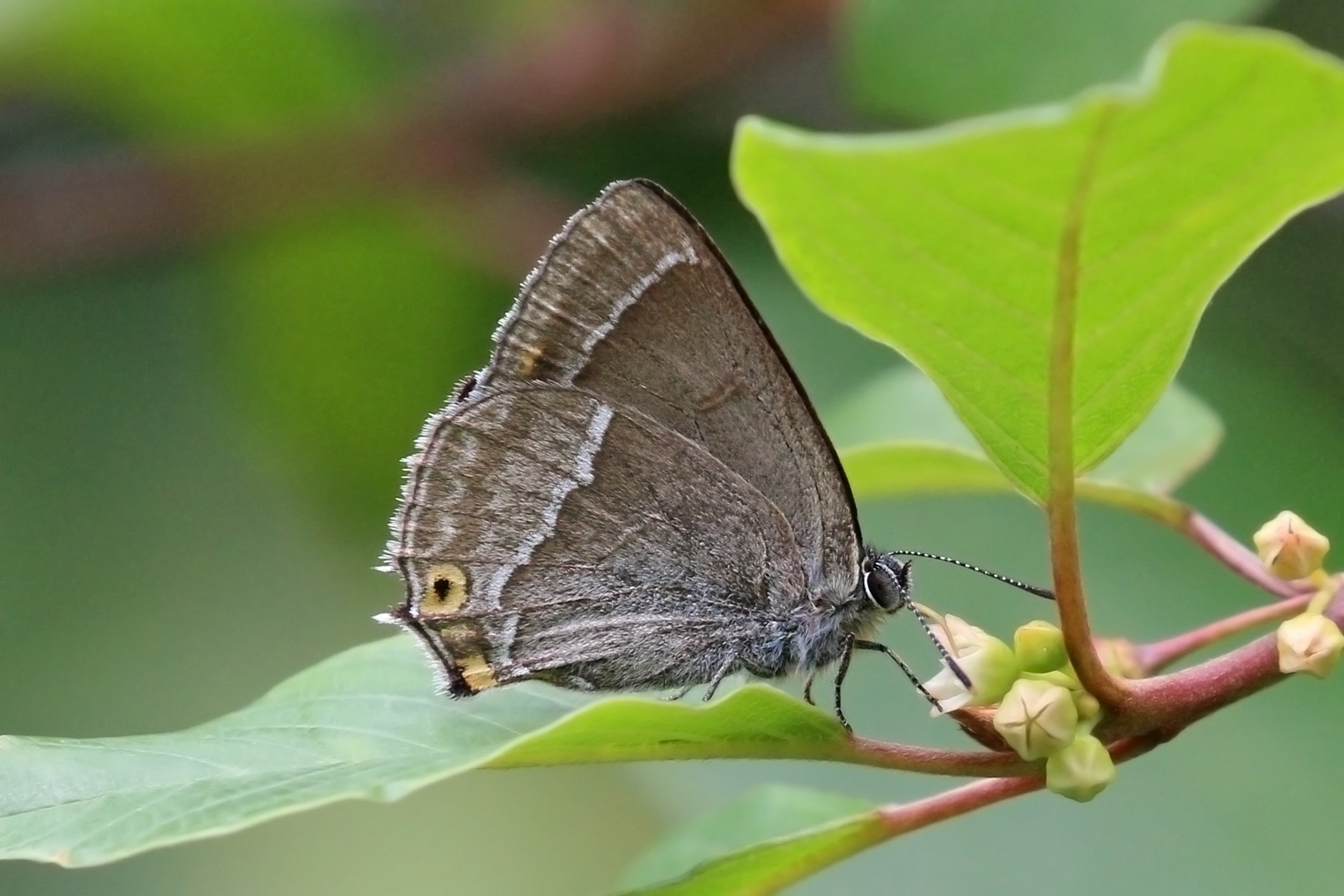
Male

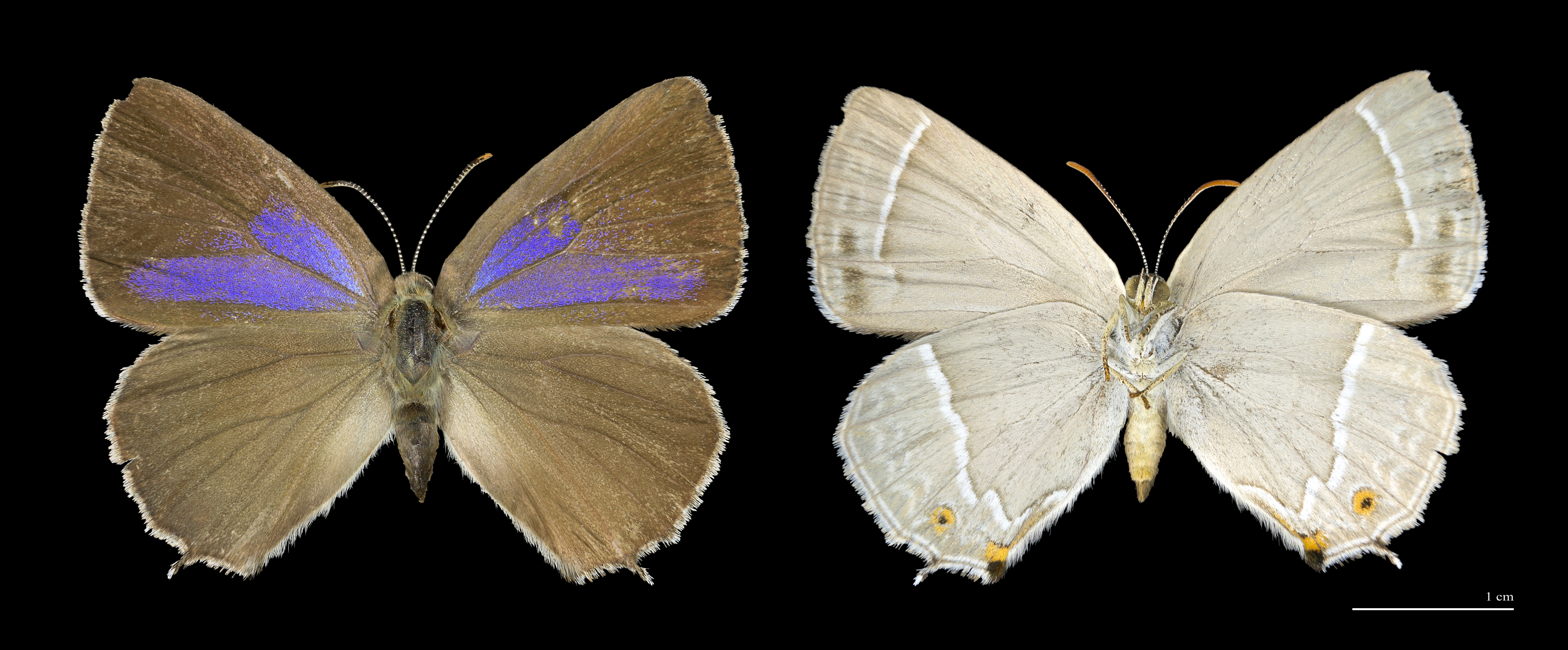
Female, mounted specimens

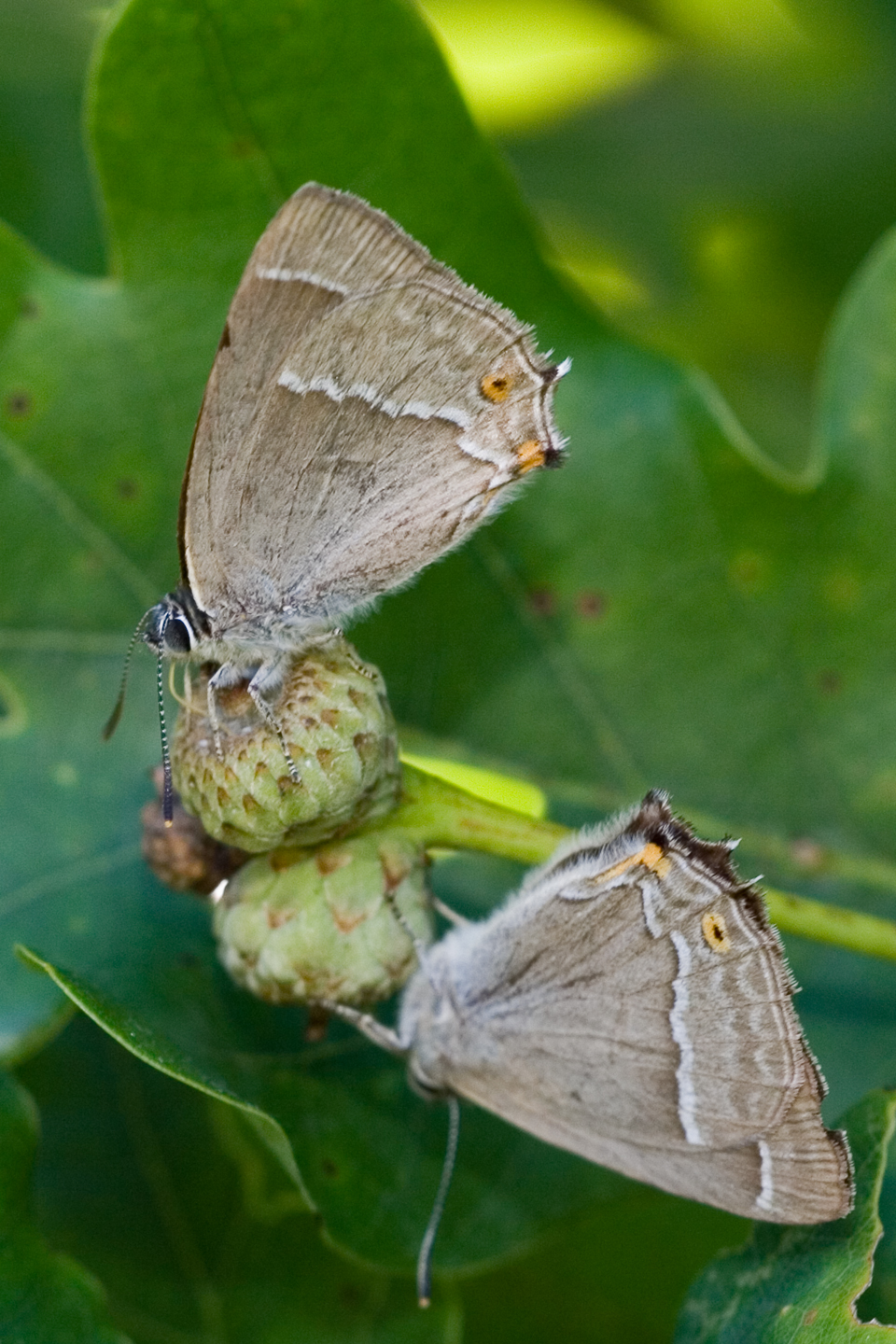

== See also ==
- List of butterflies of Great Britain
