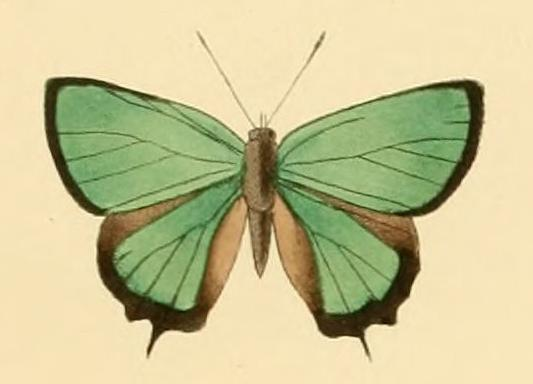

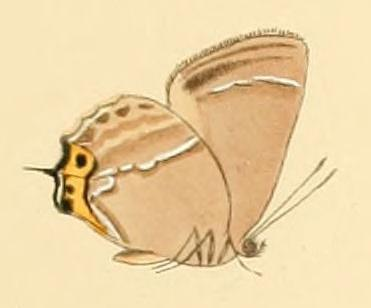

Scientific classification
- Domain: Eukaryota
- Kingdom: Animalia
- Phylum: Arthropoda
- Class: Insecta
- Order: Lepidoptera
- Family: Lycaenidae
- Genus: Favonius
- Species: F. taxila

Binomial name
- Favonius taxila (Bremer, 1861)

Synonyms
- Thecla taxila Bremer, 1861; Zephyrus jozanus Matsumura, 1915; Favonius jezoensis f. azumayamensis Kanda, 1933

= Favonius taxila =

Species of butterfly

Favonius taxila is a butterfly in the family Lycaenidae. It is found in the Russian Far East, north-eastern China, Korea and Japan.

The length of the front wing of butterflies is 17-20 mm . Females are slightly larger than males. The upper side of the wings of males is emerald green and shiny. There is a dark border on the front wing. On the front wing it is very narrow, about 0.5 mm wide, on the hind wing it is 2-2.5 mm wide. Hind wings with a tail, the length of which reaches about 4 mm. The color of the upper side of the female's wings is brown-brown with a blurred light spot on the front wing. The undersides of the wings are yellowish-gray in both sexes. The white transverse stripe on the underside of the wings is distinct, at the anterior edge of the forewing it bends towards the apex of the wing. The narrow spot at the top of the central cell is practically invisible. On the hind wing, an additional small spot adjoins the orange spot with a black pupil. ultramarina Fixs., from Corea, has more bluish golden gloss above. — japonica Murr. is the largest form and has the strongest golden gloss of all; Japan. In ab. fasciata Jans. the hindmargin of the forewing above is coppery. — regina Btlr. has a light cobalt-blue sheen.

== Subspecies ==
- Favonius taxila taxila (Amur, Ussuri, Japan: Hokkaido)
- Favonius taxila xinlongensis Murayama, 1991 (Central China)
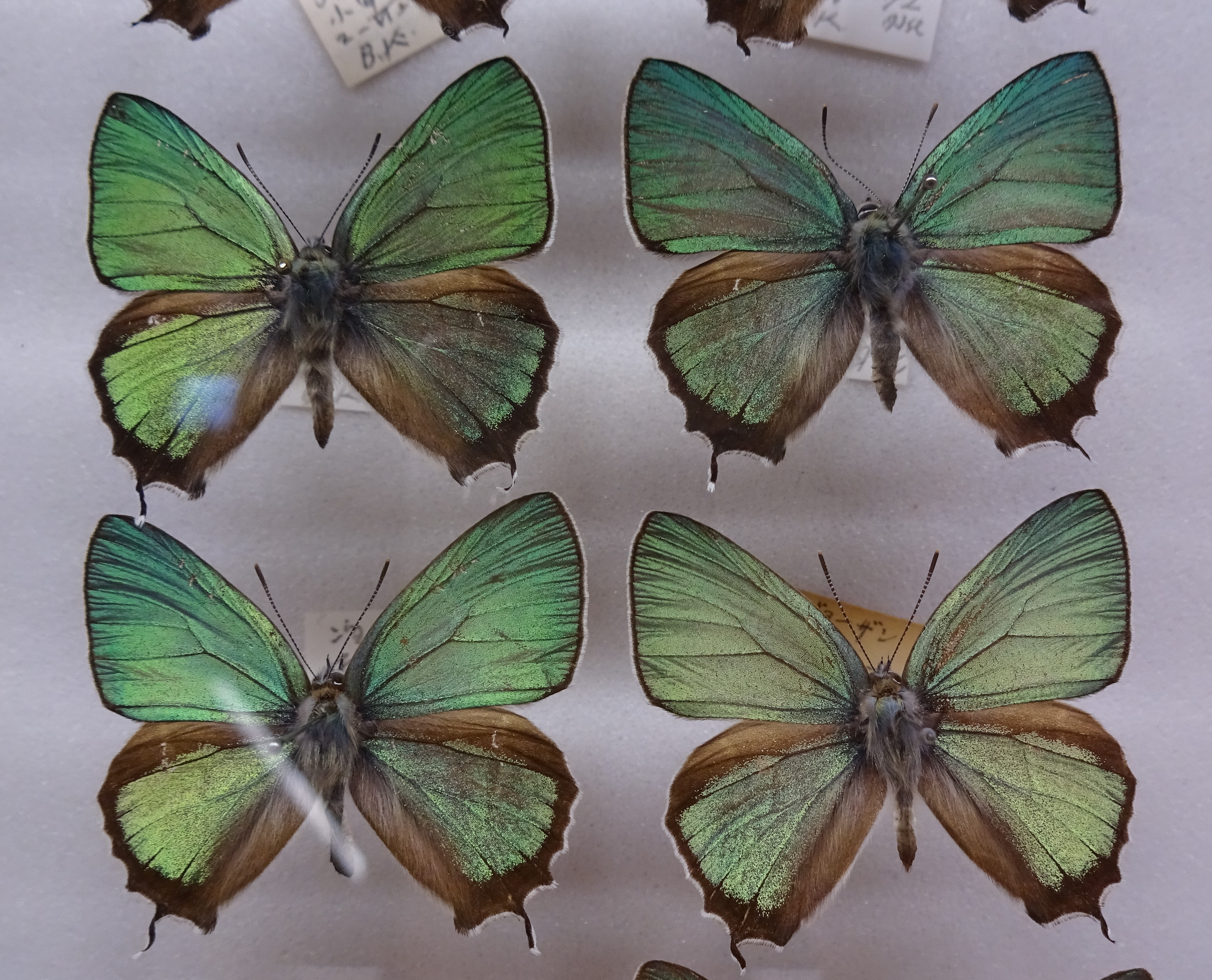
male

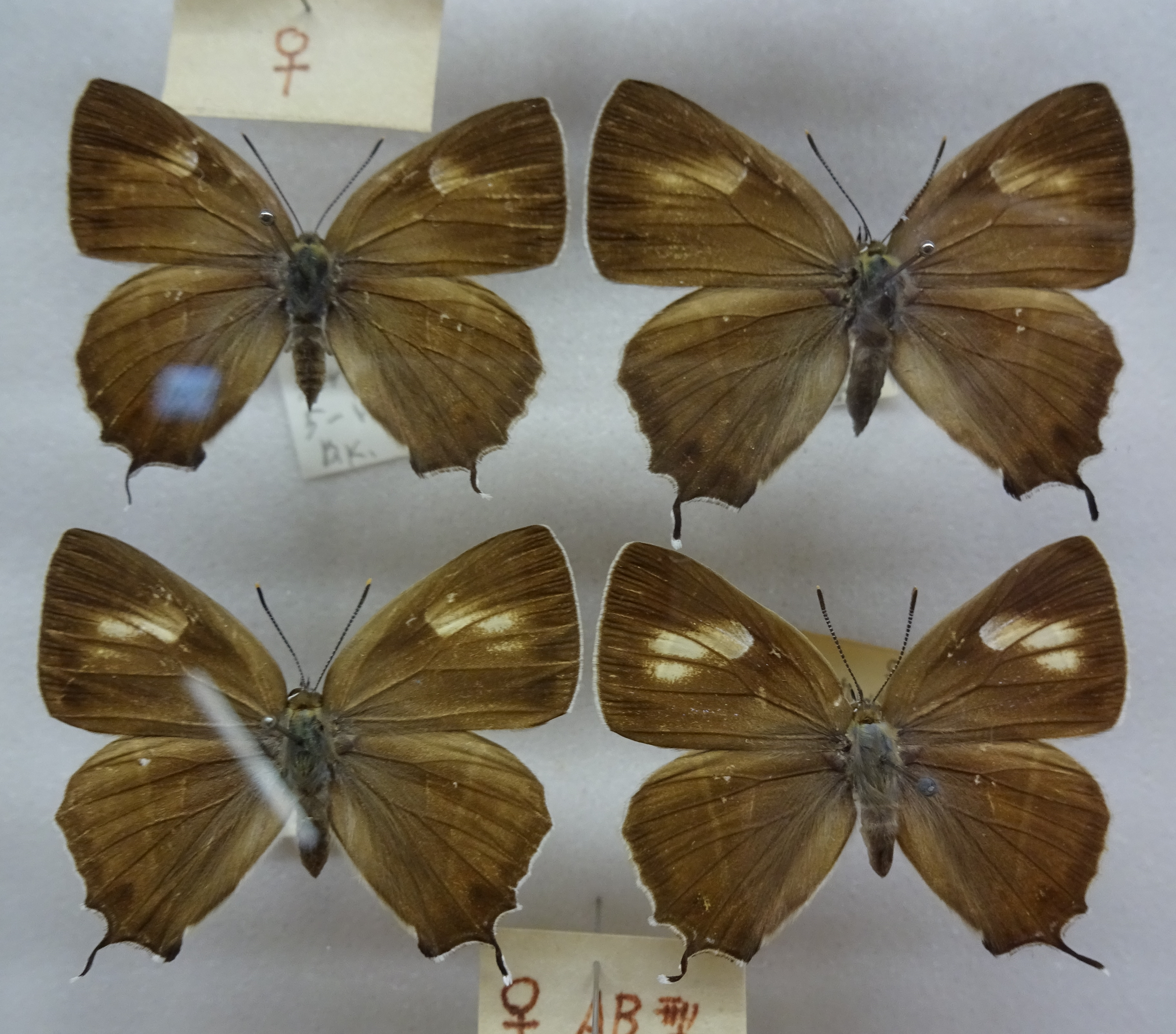
female
