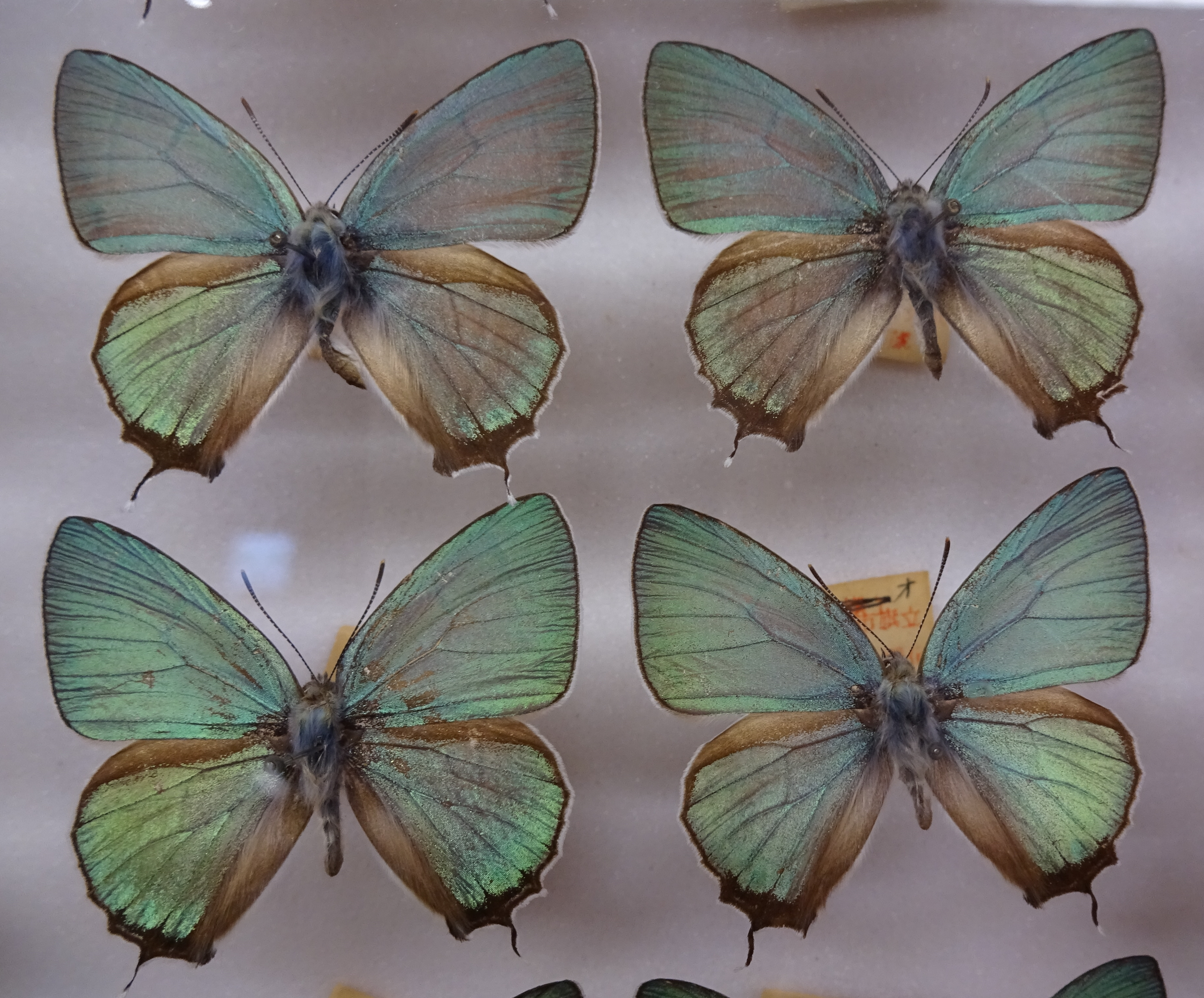

Scientific classification
- Domain: Eukaryota
- Kingdom: Animalia
- Phylum: Arthropoda
- Class: Insecta
- Order: Lepidoptera
- Family: Lycaenidae
- Genus: Favonius
- Species: F. orientalis

Binomial name
- Favonius orientalis (Murray, 1875)

Synonyms
- Dipsas orientalis Murray, 1875; Ruralis orientalis chosenicola Bryk, 1946; Favonius shirozui Murayama, 1956; Favonius orientalis primoriensis Murayama, 1978

= Favonius orientalis =

Species of butterfly

Favonius orientalis is an East Palearctic species of hairstreak butterfly found in China, Amur, Ussuri, Kunashir, Japan, and Korea.

The larva feeds on Quercus mongolica, Quercus serrata, Quercus dentata, Quercus acutissima, Quercus variabilis and Fabaceae.

== Subspecies ==
- F. o. orientalis (Honshu)
- F. o. shirozui Murayama, 1956 (Hokkaido)
- F. o. schischkini Kurentzov, 1970 (Amur, Ussuri, Kunashir)
