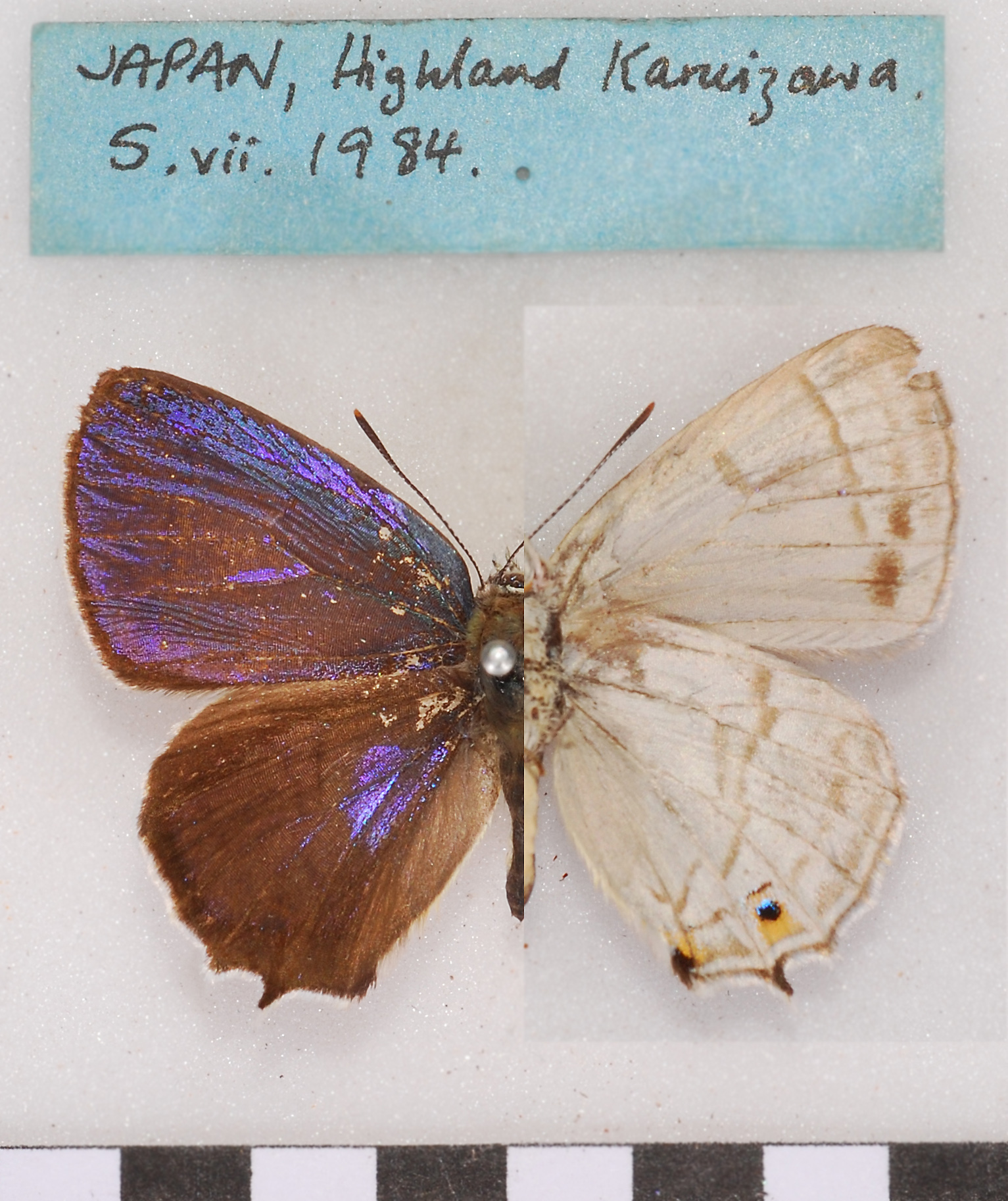

Scientific classification
- Domain: Eukaryota
- Kingdom: Animalia
- Phylum: Arthropoda
- Class: Insecta
- Order: Lepidoptera
- Family: Lycaenidae
- Genus: Favonius
- Species: F. saphirinus

Binomial name
- Favonius saphirinus (Staudinger, 1887)

Synonyms
- Thecla saphirina Staudinger, 1887; Neozephirus saphirinus; Zephyrus immaculatus Watari, 1935; Zephyrus pedius Leech, 1894; Chrysozephyrus pedius

= Favonius saphirinus =

Species of butterfly

Favonius saphirinus is a butterfly in the family Lycaenidae. It is found in the Russian Far East, north-eastern China, Korea and Japan.

== Subspecies ==
- Favonius saphirinus saphirinus (Amur, Ussuri)
- Favonius saphirinus graeseri Dantchenko, 2000 (southern Ussuri)
- Favonius saphirinus jezonicus Murayama, 1953 (Japan: Hokkaido)
- Favonius saphirinus nipponicus Murayama, 1953 (Japan: Honshu)
- Favonius saphirinus okadai Koiwaya, 1996 (Sichuan)
- Favonius saphirinus oseanus Murayama, 1953 (Japan: Honshu)
- Favonius saphirinus pedius (Leech, 1894) (Sichuan)
