= Chilades serrula =

Scientific classification
- Domain: Eukaryota
- Kingdom: Animalia
- Phylum: Arthropoda
- Class: Insecta
- Order: Lepidoptera
- Family: Lycaenidae
- Genus: Chilades
- Species: C. serrula

Binomial name
- Chilades serrula (Mabille, 1890)

Synonyms
- Lycaena serrula Mabille, 1890; Freyeria serrula

Species of butterfly

Chilades serrula is a butterfly in the family Lycaenidae. It is found in Senegal.
