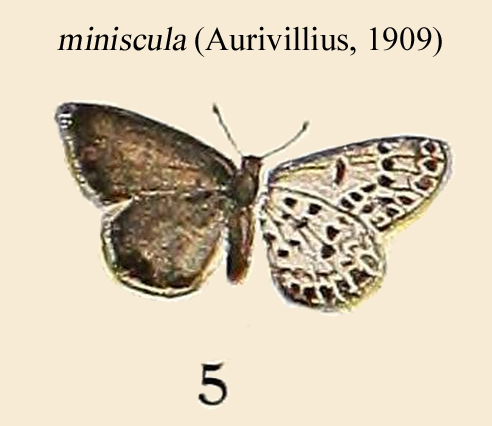

Scientific classification
- Domain: Eukaryota
- Kingdom: Animalia
- Phylum: Arthropoda
- Class: Insecta
- Order: Lepidoptera
- Family: Lycaenidae
- Genus: Freyeria
- Species: F. minuscula

Binomial name
- Freyeria minuscula (Aurivillius, 1909)

Synonyms
- Cupido minuscula Aurivillius, 1909; Chilades minuscula

= Freyeria minuscula =

Species of butterfly

Freyeria minuscula is a butterfly in the family Lycaenidae. It is found on Madagascar. The habitat consists of transformed grassland.
