= Chilades elicola =

Scientific classification
- Kingdom: Animalia
- Phylum: Arthropoda
- Class: Insecta
- Order: Lepidoptera
- Family: Lycaenidae
- Genus: Chilades
- Species: C. elicola

Binomial name
- Chilades elicola (Strand, 1911)

Synonyms
- Cupido elicola Strand, 1911; Freyeria elicola

Species of butterfly

Chilades elicola is a butterfly in the family Lycaenidae. It is found in Ethiopia.
