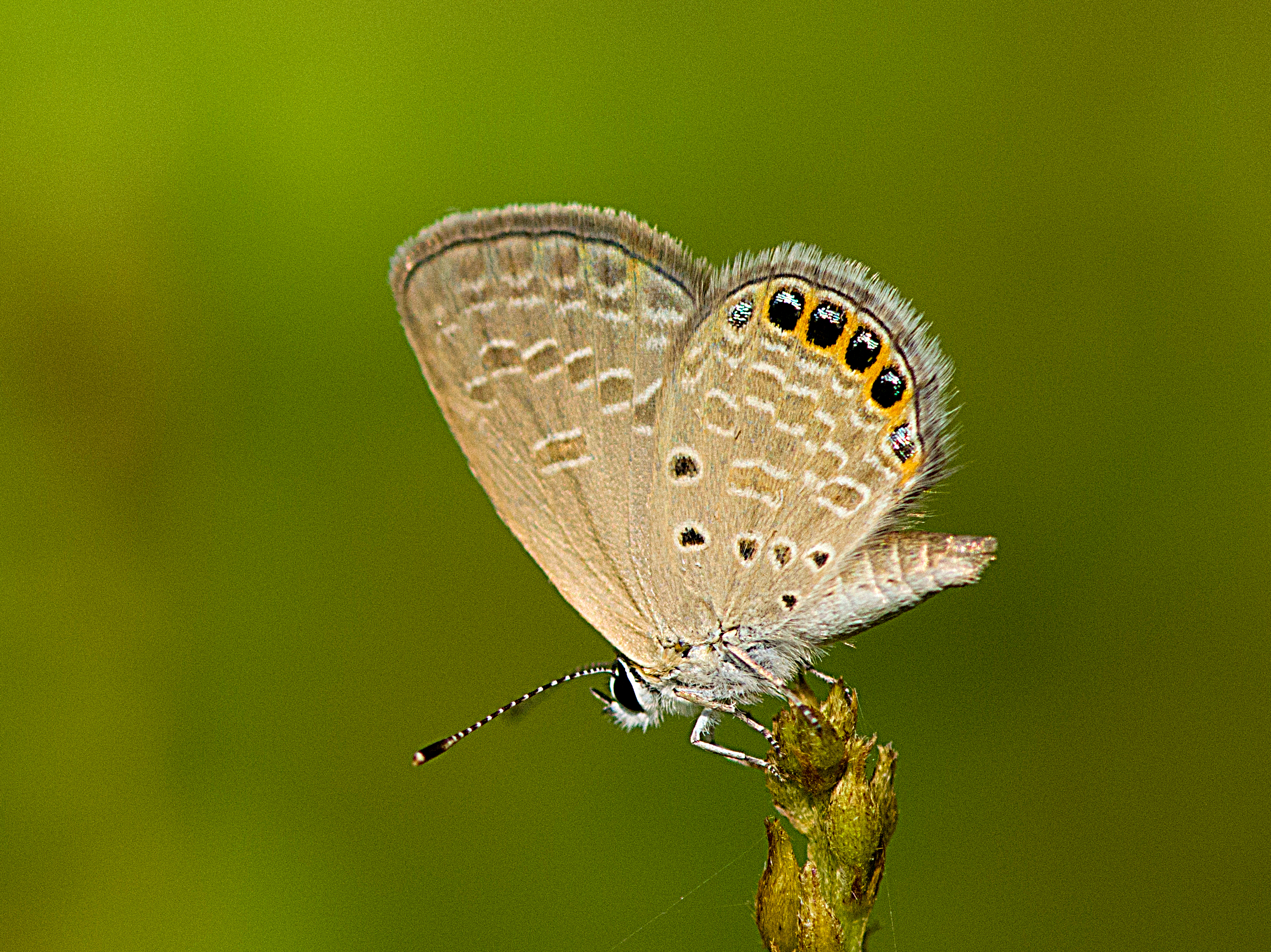

Scientific classification
- Kingdom: Animalia
- Phylum: Arthropoda
- Class: Insecta
- Order: Lepidoptera
- Family: Lycaenidae
- Genus: Freyeria
- Species: F. putli

Binomial name
- Freyeria putli (Kollar 1844)

Synonyms
- Lycaena putli Kollar, [1844]; Chilades putli; Zizeeria putli; Freyeria trochilus putli

= Freyeria putli =

Eastern grass jewel

Species of butterfly

Freyeria putli, the eastern grass jewel or small grass jewel, or oriental grass jewel is a small butterfly found in Ceylon, Myanmar, Maldives, India and Australia that belongs to the lycaenids or blues family.

== Description ==
Frederic Moore (1880) gives a detailed description:

Male. Upperside violet-brown : hindwing with indistinct marginal pale-bordered black spots. Cilia cinereous-white. Underside cinereous-brown : forewing with a white-bordered brown discocellular spot, a transverse discal and a submarginal row of similar spots : hindwing with a white-bordered black costal spot, four transverse subbasal spots and one near base of abdominal margin; a white-bordered brown discocellular spot and a transverse discal row of similar spots, a marginal row of six prominent black conical spots speckled with metallic-green, the outer one at each end less distinct, each bordered by ochreous-yellow and above by a double white lunular line. Female. Upperside similar, the marginal spots on hindwiag slightly bordered with ochreous; markings of underside more distinct.

— Frederic Moore, The Lepidoptera of Ceylon. Vol. I

== See also ==
- List of butterflies of India
- List of butterflies of India (Lycaenidae)
