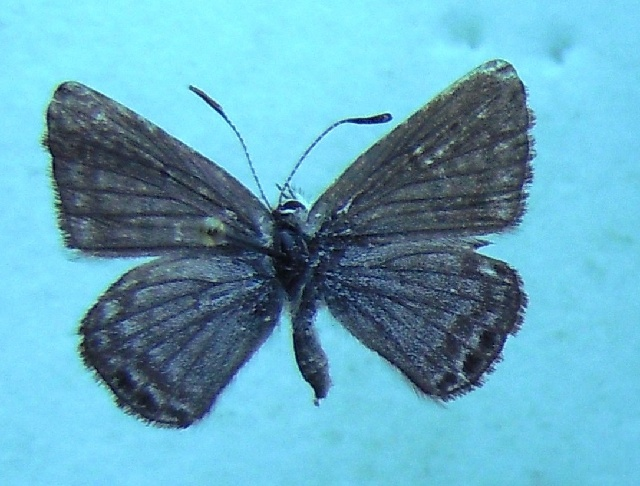

Scientific classification
- Kingdom: Animalia
- Phylum: Arthropoda
- Class: Insecta
- Order: Lepidoptera
- Family: Lycaenidae
- Genus: Chilades
- Species: C. evorae

Binomial name
- Chilades evorae Libert, Baliteau & Baliteau, 2011

= Chilades evorae =

Species of butterfly

Chilades evorae is a butterfly species in the family Lycaenidae. It occurs on Santo Antão island in Cape Verde. The type locality is near Mesa, at 650m elevation, 5 km north of Porto Novo.
