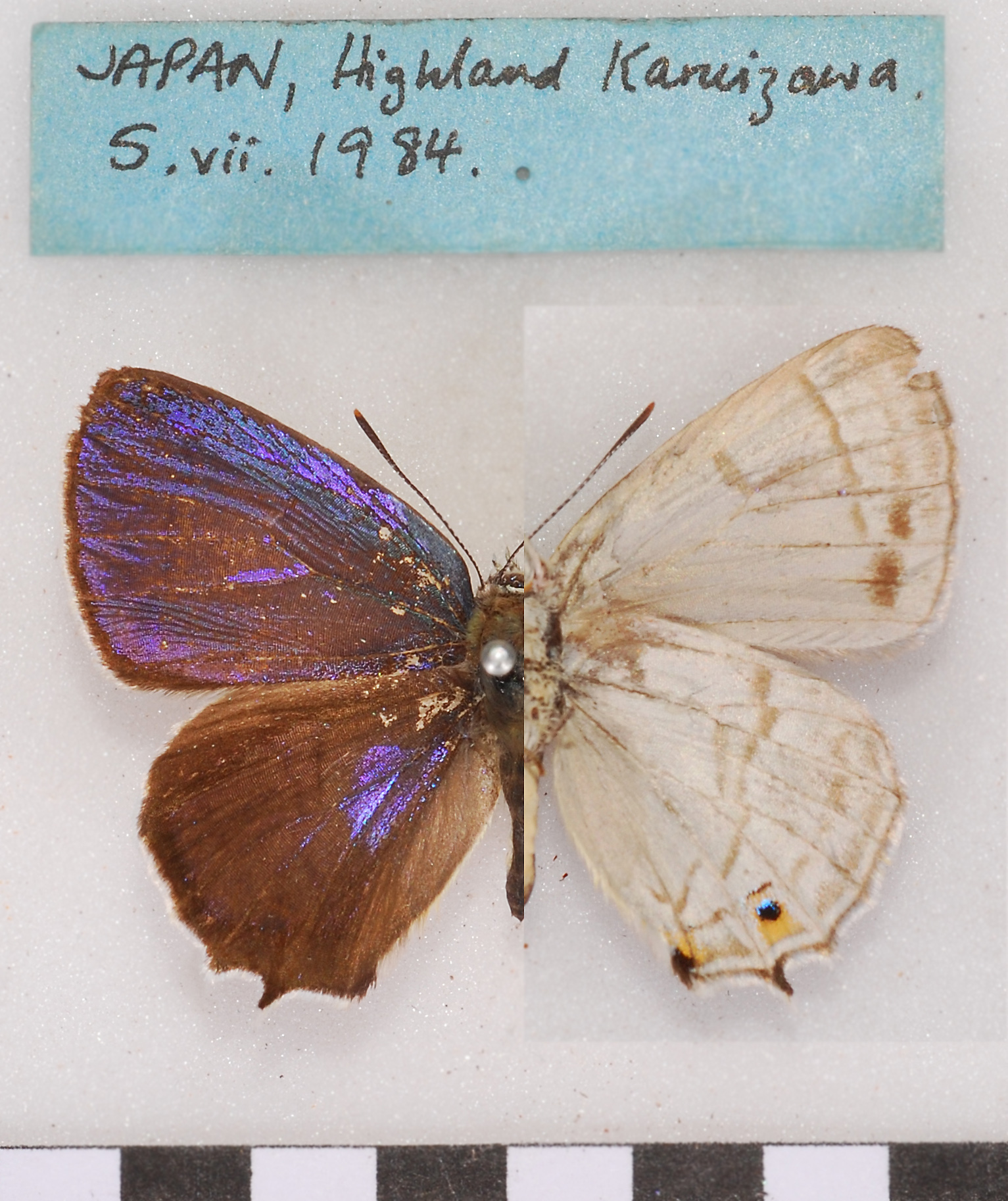
- Favonius saphirinus

Scientific classification
- Domain: Eukaryota
- Kingdom: Animalia
- Phylum: Arthropoda
- Class: Insecta
- Order: Lepidoptera
- Family: Lycaenidae
- Tribe: Theclini
- Genus: Favonius; Sibatani & Ito, 1942

Synonyms
- Neozephyrus Sibatani & Ito, 1942; Quercusia Verity, 1943

= Favonius (butterfly) =

Butterfly genus in family Lycaenidae

Favonius is a Palearctic genus of butterflies in the family Lycaenidae.

== Species list ==
- Subgenus Favonius
  - Favonius cognatus (Staudinger, 1892) north-eastern China and Korea
    - Favonius cognatus cognatus
    - Favonius cognatus ackeryi (Fujioka, 1994)
    - Favonius cognatus latifasciatus (Shirôzu & Hayashi, 1959) Japan
  - Favonius jezoensis (Matsumura, 1915) Sakhalin, Kuriles, Japan (Hokkaido)
    - Favonius jezoensis jezoensis
    - Favonius jezoensis azumajamensis (Kanda, 1994)
    - Favonius jezoensis daisenensis (Tanaka, 1941)
    - Favonius jezoensis magnificans Murayama, 1953
  - Favonius korshunovi (Dubatolov & Sergeev, 1982) northeastern China, Amur Oblast, Ussuri, Korea
    - Favonius korshunovi korshunovi
    - Favonius korshunovi macrocercus (Wakabayashi & Fukuda, 1985)
    - Favonius korshunovi shinichiroi Fujioka, 2003
  - Favonius leechi (Riley, 1939) Sichuan
  - Favonius orientalis (Murray, 1875) Amur Oblast, Ussuri, Kunashir, north-eastern China, Korea, Japan
    - Favonius orientalis orientalis
    - Favonius orientalis shirozui Murayama, 1956
    - Favonius orientalis schischkini Kurentzov, 1970
  - Favonius taxila (Bremer, 1861) north-eastern and central China, Amur Oblast, Ussuri, Korea, Japan
  - Favonius ultramarinus (Fixsen, 1887) north-eastern China, Korea and Japan
    - Favonius ultramarinus ultramarinus Korea
    - Favonius ultramarinus borealis (Murayama, 1953) Japan
    - Favonius ultramarinus hayashii (Shirôzu, 1953) Japan
    - Favonius ultramarinus okumotoi (Koiwaya, 1996)
    - Favonius ultramarinus suffusa (Leech, 1894)
  - Favonius unoi Fujioka, 2003
  - Favonius watanabei Koiwaya, 2002 Myanmar
  - Favonius yuasai Shirôzu, 1948 Japan
    - Favonius yuasai coreensis Myrayama, 1963 South Korea
- Subgenus Tasogare Sugiura, 1993
  - Favonius saphirinus (Staudinger, 1887) northeastern China, Korea, Japan, Amur Oblast, Ussuri
- Incertae sedis
  - Favonius latimarginata Murayama, 1963 Japan
  - Favonius leechina Lamas, 2008

== Former species ==
- Favonius fujisanus Matsumura, 1910 is now Sibataniozephyrus fujisanus (Matsumura, 1910)
- Favonius quercus (Linnaeus, 1758) is now Neozephyrus quercus North Africa, Europe and Asia Minor
  - Favonius quercus iberica (Staudinger, 1901) Morocco, Algeria, Spain
  - Favonius quercus interjectus (Verity, 1919)
  - Favonius quercus longicaudatus (Riley, 1921) Turkey, Azerbaijan, western Iran
