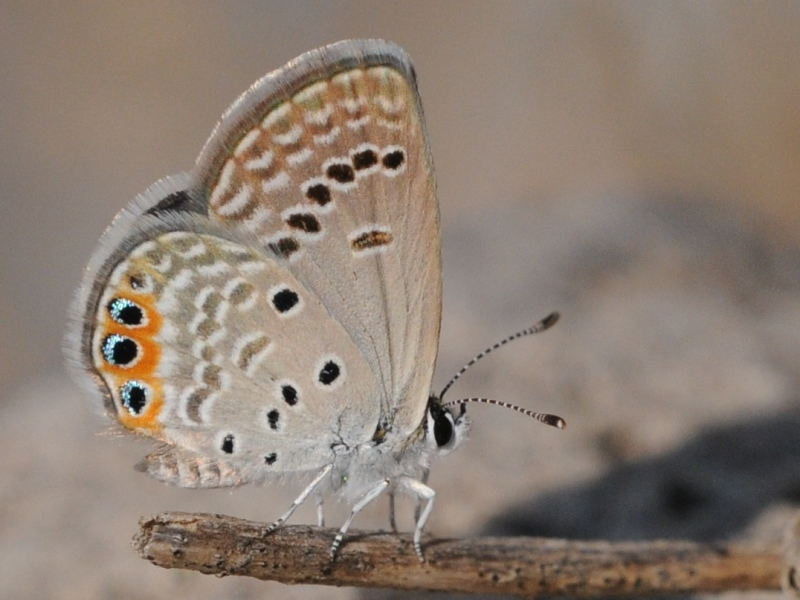
- Freyeria trochylus

Scientific classification
- Domain: Eukaryota
- Kingdom: Animalia
- Phylum: Arthropoda
- Class: Insecta
- Order: Lepidoptera
- Family: Lycaenidae
- Subfamily: Polyommatinae
- Tribe: Polyommatini
- Genus: Freyeria; Courvoisier, 1920

= Freyeria =

Butterfly genus in family Lycaenidae

Freyeria is a genus of butterflies in the family Lycaenidae erected by Ludwig Georg Courvoisier in 1920.

It currently includes three species:

- Freyeria putli (Kollar, [1844]) – eastern grass jewel – Ceylon, South India, northeast India, Australia (Northern Territory, Queensland), Ryukyu Islands
- Freyeria minuscula (Aurivillius, 1909) – Madagascar
- Freyeria trochylus (Freyer, 1845) – grass jewel – Africa, Arabia, Bulgaria, Greece, Asia Minor, southern Asia
