= List of butterflies of Indochina =

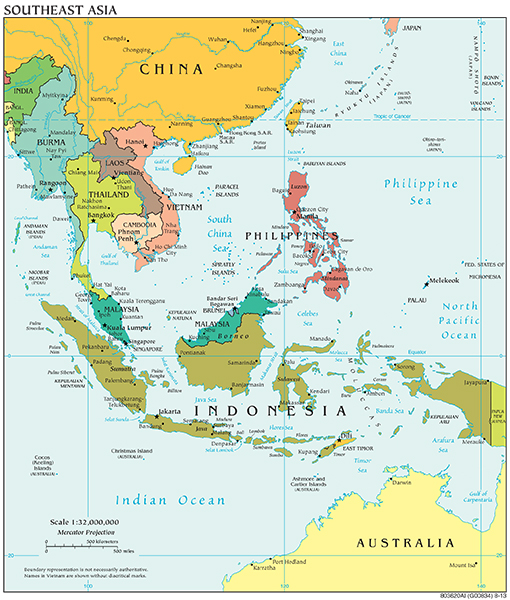
Map including Southeast Asia the large islands in the east of the Indomalayan realm and parts of the Australasian realm which has a different butterfly fauna. The Wallace Line lies east of Borneo and West of Sulawesi.

The following is a list of all butterflies found in the Indochinese biogeographic region (Thailand, Laos and Vietnam, Cambodia, Myanmar (formerly Burma; part of British India until 1937), Peninsular Malaysia and Singapore in the Indomalayan realm).

The climate of Indochina is subtropical in the north, tropical further south. Indochinese terrestrial ecoregions include the Northeast India–Myanmar pine forests, Northern Triangle temperate forests, Myanmar Coast mangroves, Chin Hills–Arakan Yoma montane forests, Mizoram–Manipur–Kachin rain forests, Northern Indochina subtropical forests, Irrawaddy dry forests, Irrawaddy freshwater swamp forests, Irrawaddy moist deciduous forests, Cardamom Mountains rain forests, Chao Phraya freshwater swamp forests, Kayah–Karen montane rain forests, Northern Indochina subtropical forests, Northern Khorat Plateau moist deciduous forests, Northern Thailand–Laos moist deciduous forests, Peninsular Malaysian montane rain forests, Peninsular Malaysian peat swamp forests, and Tenasserim–South Thailand semi-evergreen rain forests.

The butterfly fauna of Indochina includes Indo-Burmese genera with a species-richness (a count of species within the genus) generally distributed from Assam to Sundaland (Sunda Islands), genera with a strong centre of species-richness in western China and the eastern Himalaya, genera with their greatest species-richness in Sundaland west of the Wallace Line and species endemic to Indochina.

== Family Hesperiidae ==
subfamily: Coeliadinae

genus: Badamia

- Badamia exclamationis (Fabricius, 1775) – brown awl

genus: Bibasis

- Bibasis jaina

Bibasis jaina jaina (Moore, 1865)
Bibasis jaina margana Fruhstorfer, 1911
Bibasis jaina velva (Evans, 1932)

- Bibasis anadi (de Niceville, [1884])

Bibasis anadi anadi (de Niceville, [1884])
Bibasis anadi owstoni (Eliot, 1980)

- Bibasis oedipodea (Swainson, 1820) – branded orange awlet

Bibasis oedipodea oedipodea (Swainson, 1820)
Bibasis oedipodea belesis (Mabille, 1876)

- Bibasis tuckeri (Elwes & Edwards, 1897)
- Bibasis etelka etelka (Hewitson, [1867]) = Burara
- Bibasis harisa (Moore, [1866])

Bibasis harisa harisa (Moore, [1866])
Bibasis harisa consobrina (Plotz, 1884)

- Bibasis vasutana (Moore, [1866])
- Bibasis miraculata Evans, 1949 = Burara
- Bibasis amara (Moore, [1866])
- Bibasis gomata (Moore, [1866])

Bibasis gomata gomata (Moore, [1866])
Bibasis gomata lalita (Fruhstorfer, 1911)

- Bibasis mahintha (Moore, [1875]) subspecies of Bibasis iluska (Hewitson, 1867)
- Bibasis sena (Moore, [1866])

Bibasis sena sena (Moore, [1866])
Bibasis sena uniformis Elwes & Edwards, 1897

genus: Choaspes

- Choaspes benjaminii – awl king

Choaspes benjaminii japonicus (Murray, 1875)

- Choaspes xanthopogon xanthopogon (Kollar, [1844])
- Choaspes stigmatus Evans, 1932 subspecies of Choaspes plateni

Choaspes stigmatus stigmatus Evans, 1932
Choaspes stigmatus caudatus Evans, 1932

- Choaspes subcaudata crawfurdi (Distant, 1882)
- Choaspes hemixanthus furcatus Evans, 1932 may be full species

genus: Hasora

- Hasora anura de Niceville, 1889 – slate awl

Hasora anura anura de Niceville, 1889
Hasora anura danda Evans, 1949

- Hasora badra badra (Moore, 1858) – common awl
- Hasora chromus chromus (Cramer, 1782) – banded awl
- Hasora taminatus bhavara Fruhstorfer, 1911 – white-banded awl
- Hasora lizetta (Plotz, 1884)
- Hasora salanga (Plotz, 1885)
- Hasora proxissima Elwes & Edwards, 1897

Hasora proxissima siamica Evans, 1932
Hasora proxissima siva Evans, 1932

- Hasora myra funebris Evans, 1932
- Hasora zoma Evans, 1934
- Hasora malayana malayana (Felder, 1860)
- Hasora schoenherr (Latreille, [1824])

Hasora schoenherr chuza (Hewitson, [1867])
Hasora schoenherr gaspa Evans, 1949

- Hasora mixta prabha Fruhstorfer, 1911
- Hasora vitta (Butler, 1870)

Hasora vitta vitta (Butler, 1870)
Hasora vitta indica Evans, 1932

- Hasora khoda coulteri Wood-Mason & de Niceville, [1887]
- Hasora mavis Evans, 1934
- Hasora leucospila leucospila (Mabille, 1891)

subfamily: Heteropterinae

genus: Apostictopterus

- Apostictopterus fuliginosus curiosa (Swinhoe, 1917)
- Astictopterus jama Felder & Felder, 1860

Astictopterus jama jama Felder & Felder, 1860
Astictopterus jama olivascens Moore, 1878

subfamily: Hesperiinae

genus: Arnetta

- Arnetta atkinsoni (Moore, 1878)
- Arnetta verones (Hewitson, 1878)

genus: Ochus

- Ochus subvittatus subvittatus (Moore, 1878)

genus: Ampittia

- Ampittia dioscorides (Fabricis, 1793)

Ampittia dioscorides camertes (Hewitson, [1868])
Ampittia dioscorides etura (Mabille, 1891)

- Ampittia maroides de Niceville, 1896

genus: Aeromachus

- Aeromachus kali (de Niceville, 1885)
- Aeromachus stigmata shanda Evans, 1949
- Aeromachus jhora creta Evans, 1949
- Aeromachus dubius impha Evans, 1949
- Aeromachus cognatus Inoue & Kawazoe, 1966
- Aeromachus pygmaeus (Fabricius, 1775)

genus: Sebastonyma

- Sebastonyma dolopia (Hewitson, [1868])
- Sebastonyma pudens Evans, 1937
- Sebastonyma suthepiana Murayama & Kimura, 1990

genus: Parasovia

- Parasovia perbella (Hering, 1918)

genus: Sovia

- Sovia albipectus (de Niceville, 1891)
- Sovia ueharai Miyazaki & Saito, 2010
- Sovia eminens Devyatkin, 1996

genus: Pedesta = Thoressa

- Pedesta masuriensis tali (Swinhoe, 1912)
- Pedesta pandita (de Niceville, 1885)
- Pedesta serena (Evans, 1937)

genus: Onryza

- Onryza meiktila (de Niceville, 1891)
- Onryza siamica Riley & Godfrey, 1925

genus: Thoressa

- Thoressa masoni (Moore, [1879])
- Thoressa hyrie (de Niceville, 1891)
- Thoressa cerata (Hewitson, 1876)
- Thoressa submacula (Leech, 1890)

Thoressa submacula (Leech, 1890)
Thoressa submacula rubella Devyatkin, 1996

- Thoressa fusca fusca (Elwes, [1893])
- Thoressa monastyrskyi Devyatkin, 1996

Thoressa monastyrskyi monastyrskyi Devyatkin, 1996
Thoressa monastyrskiyi annamita Devyatkin & Monastyrskii, 1999

genus: Halpe

- Halpe zema zema (Hewitson, 1877)
- Halpe ormenes vilasina Fruhstorfer, 1911
- Halpe zola zola Evans, 1937
- Halpe elana Eliot, 1959
- Halpe insignis (Distant, 1886)
- Halpe sikkima Moore, 1882
- Halpe porus (Mabille, [1877])
- Halpe hauxwelli Evans, 1937
- Halpe burmana Swinhoe, 1913
- Halpe handa Evans, 1949
- Halpe nephele Leech, 1893
- Halpe arcuata Evans, 1937
- Halpe flava Evans, 1926
- Halpe aurifera (Elwes & Edwards, 1897)
- Halpe toxopea Evans, 1932
- Halpe kusala Fruhstorfer, 1911
- Halpe pelethronix pelethronix Fruhstorfer, 1910
- Halpe wantona Swinhoe, 1893
- Halpe veluvana brevicornis Evans, 1932
- Halpe frontieri Devyatkin, 1997
- Halpe gamma Evans, 1937

genus: Pithauria

- Pithauria stramineipennis Wood-Mason & de Niceville, [1887]
- Pithauria murdava (Moore, [1866])
- Pithauria marsena (Hewitson, [1866])

genus: Isoteinon

- Isoteinon lamprospilus formosanus Fruhstorfer, 1910

genus: Iambrix

- Iambrix salsala salsala (Moore, [1866])
- Iambrix stellifer (Butler, [1879])

genus: Idmon

- Idmon distanti Shepard, 1937
- Idmon obliquans obliquans (Mabille, 1893)

genus: Koruthaialos

- Koruthaialos rubecula (Plotz, 1882)

Koruthaialos rubecula rubecula (Plotz, 1882)
Koruthaialos rubecula hector Watson, 1893

- Koruthaialos butleri de Niceville, [1884]
- Koruthaialos sindu sindu (Felder & Felder, 1860)

genus: Psolos

- Psolos fuligo (Mabille, 1876)

Psolos fuligo fuligo (Mabille, 1876)
Psolos fuligo subfasciatus (Moore, [1879])

genus: Stimula

- Stimula swinhoei swinhoei (Elwes & Edwards, 1897)

genus: Ancistroides

- Ancistroides nigrita (Latreille, [1824])

Ancistroides nigrita diocles (Moore, [1866])
Ancistroides nigrita othonias (Hewitson, 1878)

- Ancistroides armatus armatus (H.Druce, 1873)
- Ancistroides gemmifer gemmifer (Butler, [1879])

genus: Notocrypta

- Notocrypta pria (H.Druce, 1873)
- Notocrypta paralysos (Wood-Mason & de Niceville, 1881)

Notocrypta paralysos varians (Plotz, 1882)
Notocrypta paralysos asawa Fruhstorfer, 1911

- Notocrypta clavata (Staudinger, 1889)

Notocrypta clavata clavata (Staudinger, 1889)
Notocrypta clavata theba Evans, 1949

- Notocrypta curvifascia (Felder & Felder, 1862)

Notocrypta curvifascia curvifascia (Felder & Felder, 1862)
Notocrypta curvifascia corinda Evans, 1949

- Notocrypta feisthamelii alysos (Moore, [1866])

genus: Udaspes

- Udaspes folus (Cramer, [1775])

genus: Scobura

- Scobura woolletti woolletti (Riley, 1923)
- Scobura phiditia (Hewitson, [1866])
- Scobura cephala (Hewitson, 1876)
- Scobura isota (Swinhoe, 1893)
- Scobura cephaloides kinka Evans, 1949
- Scobura coniata Hering, 1918

genus: Suada

- Suada swerga suava Evans, 1949
- Suada albolineata Devyatkin, 2000

genus: Suastus

- Suastus gremius gremius (Fabricius, 1798)
- Suastus minutus aditia Evans, 1943
- Suastus everyx everyx (Mabille, 1883)

genus: Cupitha

- Cupitha purreea (Moore, 1877)

genus: Zographetus

- Zographetus satwa (de Niceville, [1884])
- Zographetus ogygia (Hewitson, [1866])
- Zographeyus doxus Eliot, 1959
- Zographetus ogygioides Elwes & Edwards, 1897
- Zographetus rama (Mabille, [1877])
- Zographeyus kutu Eliot, 1959

genus: Oerane

- Oerane microthyrus neaera (de Niceville, 1891)

genus: Hyarotis

- Hyarotis adrastus praba (Moore, 1865)
- Hyarotis stubbsi Eliot, 1959
- Hyarotis microsticta microsticta (Wood-Mason & Niceville, [1887])
- Hyarotis iadera (de Niceville, 1895)

genus: Quedara

- Quedara albifascia (Moore, [1879])
- Quedara monteithi monteithi (Wood-Mason & de Niceville, [1887])
- Quadara flavens Devyatkin, 2000

genus: Isma

- Isma iapis iapis (de Niceville, 1890)
- Isma protoclea (Herich-Schaffer, 1869)

Isma protoclea obscura Distant, 1886
Isma protoclea bicolor Evans, 1926

- Isma feralia lenya (Evans, 1932)
- Isma dawna (Evans, 1926)
- Isma umbrosa (Elwes & Edwards, 1897)

Isma umbrosa umbrosa (Elwes & Edwards, 1897)
Isma umbrosa minuscla Inoue & Kawazoe, 1967

- Isma miosticta (de Niceville, 1891)
- Isma damocles (Evans, [1939])
- Isma guttulifera kuala (Evans, 1932)
- Isma bononoides (H.H.Druce, 1912)
- Isma bononia bononia (Hewitson, 1868)

genus: Pyroneura

- Pyroneura helena (Butler, 1870)
- Pyroneura natuna (Fruhstorfer, 1909)
- Pyroneura flavia fruhstorferi (Mabille, 1893)
- Pyroneura latoia latoia (Hewitson, [1868])
- Pyroneura klanga (Evans, 1941)
- Pyroneura derna (Evans, 1941)
- Pyroneura niasana burmana (Evans, 1926)
- Pyroneura callineura ssp.
- Pyroneura agnesia agnesia (Eliot, 1967)
- Pyroneura perakana perakana (Evans, 1926)
- Pyroneura margherita miriam (Evans, 1941)
- Pyroneura aurantiaca montivaga (Pendlebury, 1939)

genus: Plastingia

- Plastingia naga (de Niceville, [1884])
- Plastingia pellonia Fruhstorfer, 1909

genus: Salanoemia

- Salanoemia tavoyana (Evans, 1926)
- Salanoemia sala (Hewitson, [1866])
- Salanoemia fuscicornis (Elwes & Edwards, 1897)

genus: Xanthoneura

- Xanthoneura corissa indrasana (Elwes & de Niceville, [1887])

genus: Pemara

- Pemara pugnans (de Niceville, 1891)

genus: Pseudokerana

- Pseudokerana fulgur (de Niceville, 1894)

genus: Lotongus

- Lotongus calathus (Hewitson, 1876)

Lotongus calathus calathus (Hewitson, 1876)
Lotongus calathus balta Evans, 1949

- Lotongus saralachinensis Evans, 1932
- Lotongus avesta (Hewitson, [1868])

genus: Zela

- Zela excellens (Staudinger, 1889)
- Zela onara solex (Evans, 1939)
- Zela zeus optima (Fruhstorfer, 1911)
- Zela zero Evans, 1932
- Zela elioti Evans, [1939]
- Zela smaragdinus (H.H.Druce, 1912)

genus: Gangara

- Gangara thyrsis thyrsis (Fabricius, 1775)
- Gangara sanguinocculus (Martin, 1895)
- Gangara lebadea lebadea (Hewitson, [1868])

genus: Erionota

- Erionota torus torus Evans, 1941
- Erionota thrax thrax (Linnaeus, 1767)
- Erionota acroleucus apicalis Evans, 1932
- Erionota grandis grandis (Leech, 1890)
- Erionota sybirita (Hewitson, 1876)

genus: Ge

- Ge geta de Niceville, 1895

genus: Matapa

- Matapa aria (Moore, [1866])
- Matapa druna (Moore, [1866])
- Matapa sasivarna (Moore, [1866])
- Matapa cresta Evans, 1949
- Matapa purpurascens Elwes & Edwards, 1897
- Matapa deprivata de Jong, 1983

genus: Unkana

- Unkana ambasa (Moore, [1858])

Unkana ambasa attina (Hewitson, [1866])
Unkana ambasa batara Distant, 1886

- Unkana flava Evans, 1932
- Unkana mytheca mytheca (Hewitson, 1877)

genus: Hidari

- Hidari irava (Moore, [1858])
- Hidari doesoena doesonea Martin, 1895
- Hidari bhawani de Nicéville, [1889]

genus: Eetion

- Eetion elia (Hewitson, [1866])

genus: Acerbas

- Acerbas anthea (Hewitson, [1868])

Acerbas anthea anthea (Hewitson, [1868])
Acerbas anthea pista Evans, 1949

- Acerbas martini (Distant & Pryer, 1887)

genus: Pirdana

- Pirdana hyela

Pirdana hyela rudolphii Elwes & de Niceville, [1887]
Pirdana hyela major Evans, 1932

- Pirdana distanti Staudinger, 1889

Pirdana distanti distanti Staudinger, 1889
Pirdana distanti spenda Evans, 1949

genus: Creteus

- Creteus cyrina cyrina (Hewitson, 1876)

genus: Ochlodes

- Ochlodes subhyalina subhyalina (Bremer & Grey, 1853)
- Ochlodes siva karennia Evans, 1932
- Ochlodes brahma (Moore, 1878)
- Ochlodes buddha ssp.

genus: Taractrocera

- Taractrocera maevius sagara (Moore, [1866])
- Taractrocera ziclea zenia Evans, 1934
- Taractrocera archias (Felder, 1860)

Taractrocera archias samadha Fruhstorfer, 1910
Taractrocera archias quinta Swinhoe, 1913

genus: Oriens

- Oriens paragola (de Niceville, [1896])
- Oriens goloides (Moore, [1881])
- Oriens gola pseudolus (Mabille, 1883)

genus: Potanthus

- Potanthus rectifasciata (Elwes & Edwards, 1897)
- Potanthus pamela Evans, 1934
- Potanthus pallida (Evans, 1932)
- Potanthus trachala tytleri (Evans, 1914)
- Potanthus pseudomaesa clio (Evans, 1932)
- Potantus juno juno (Evans, 1932)
- Potanthus sita (Evans, 1932)
- Potanthus omaha omaha (W.H.Edwards, 1863)
- Potanthus flava alcon (Evans, 1932)
- Potanthus confucius dushta (Fruhstorfer, 1911)
- Potanthus nesta nesta (Evans, 1934)
- Potanthus mingo ajax (Evans, 1932)
- Potanthus pava pava (Fruhstorfer, 1911)
- Potanthus lydia (Evans, 1934)

Potanthus lydia lydia (Evans, 1934)
Potanthus lydia fraseri (Evans, 1934)

- Potanthus ganda ganda (Fruhstorfer, 1911)
- Potanthus chloe Eliot, 1960
- Potanthus palnia palnia (Evans, 1914)
- Potanthus hetaerus serina (Plotz, 1883)
- Potanthus parvus Johnson & Johnson, 1980

genus: Telicota

- Telicota colon stinga Evans, 1949
- Telicota augias augias (Linnaeus, 1767)
- Telicota linna linna Evans, 1949
- Telicota besta besta Evans, 1949
- Telicota bambusae (Moore, 1878)

Telicota bambusae bambusae (Moore, 1878)
Telicota bambusae horisha Evans, 1934

- Telicota ohara jix Evans, 1949
- Telicota hilda hilda Eliot, 1959

genus: Cephrenes

- Cephrenes acalle (Hopffer, 1874)

Cephrenes acalle niasicus (Plotz, 1886)

- Cephrenes acalle oceanicus (Mabille, 1904)

genus: Parnara

- Parnara guttatus mangala (Moore, [1866])
- Parnara naso bada (Moore, 1878)
- Parnara ganga Evans, 1937
- Parnara apostata hulsei Devyatkin & Monastyrskii, 1999

genus: Borbo

- Borbo cinnara (Wallace, 1866)

genus: Pseudoborbo

- Pseudoborbo bevani (Moore, 1878)

genus: Pelopidas

- Pelopidas sinensis Mabille, 1877
- Pelopidas agna agna (Moore, [1866])
- Pelopidas subochracea barneyi (Evans, 1937)
- Pelopidas flavus (Evans, 1926)
- Pelopidas mathias mathias (Fabricius, 1798)
- Pelopidas assamensis (de Niceville, 1882)
- Pelopidas conjunctus conjunctus (Herrich-Schaffer, 1869)

genus: Polytremis

- Polytremis lubricans lubricans (Herrich-Schaffer, 1869)
- Polytremis minuta (Evans, 1926)
- Polytremis annama Evans, 1937
- Polytremis discreta discreta (Elwes & Edwards, 1897)
- Polytremis eltola eltola (Hewitson, [1869])

genus: Baoris

- Baoris farri farri (Moore, 1878)
- Baoris oceia (Hewitson, [1868])
- Baoris penicillata

Baoris penicillata unicolor Moore, [1884]
Baoris penicillata chapmani Evans, 1937

- Baoris pagana (de Niceville, 1887)

genus: Caltoris

- Caltoris brunnea caere (de Niceville, 1891)
- Caltoris sirius sirius (Evans, 1926)
- Caltoris cahira austeni (Moore, [1884])
- Caltoris tenuis (Evans, 1932)
- Caltoris bromus bromus Leech, 1893
- Caltoris confusa (Evans, 1932)
- Caltoris cormasa (Hewitson, 1876)
- Caltoris kumara moorei (Evans, 1926)
- Caltoris malaya (Evans, 1926)
- Caltoris tulsi tulsi (de Niceville, [1884])
- Caltoris plebeia (de Niceville, 1887)
- Caltoris philippina philippina (Herrich-Schaffer, 1869)

genus: Iton

- Iton semamora semamora (Moore, [1866])
- Iton watsonii (de Niceville, 1890)

subfamily: Pyrginae

genus: Abraximorpha

- Abraximorpha davidii (Mabille, 1876) – magpie flat

Abraximorpha davidii davidii (Mabille, 1876)
Abraximorpha davidii esta Evans, 1949
Abraximorpha davidii elfina Evans, 1949

genus: Capila

- Capila lidderdali (Elwes, 1888)
- Capila lineata Chou & Gu, 1994

Capila lineata magna Devyatkin & Monastyrskii, 1999
Capila lineata irregularis Devyatkin & Monastyrskii, 2002

- Capila pauripunetata tamdaoensis Devyatkin, 1996
- Capila phanaeus (Hewitson, 1867)

Capila phanaeus lalita (Doherty, [1886])
Capila phanaeus fulva Evans, 1932
Capila phanaeus flora Evans, 1934
Capila phanaeus ferrea Evans, 1934
Capila phanaeus falta Evans, 1949
Capila phanaeus decoloris Inoue & Kawazoe, 1964

- Capila pennicillatum insularis (Joicey & Talbot, 1921)
- Capila pieridoides (Moore, 1878)

Capila pieridoides pieridoides (Moore, 1878)
Capila pieridoides sofa Evans, 1934

- Capila translucida Leech, 1894
- Capila jayadeva (Moore, 1866)
- Capila zennara sukkiti Ek-Amnuay, 2006
- Capila hainana Crowley, 1900

Capila hainana hainana Crowley, 1900
Capila hainana arooni Eliot, 1987

genus: Lobocla

- Lobocla liliana (Atkinson, 1871)

Lobocla liliana liliana (Atkinson, 1871)
Lobocla liliana tonka Evans, 1949

genus: Celaenorrhinus

- Celaenorrhinus aspersa

Celaenorrhinus aspersa aspersa Leech, 1891
Celaenorrhinus aspersa pinratanai Eliot, 1984

- Celaenorrhinus inexpectus Devyatkin, 2000
- Celaenorrhinus incestus Devyatkin, 2000
- Celaenorrhinus phuongi Devyatkin, 2001
- Celaenorrhinus oscula Evans, 1949
- Celaenorrhinus kuznetsovi Devyatkin, 2000
- Celaenorrhinus pyrrha de Niceville, 1889
- Celaenorrhinus ratna tytleri Evans, 1926
- Celaenorrhinus pero luciferaLeech, 1893
- Celaenorrhinus sumitra (Moore, [1866])
- Celaenorrhinus patula de Niceville, 1889
- Celaenorrhinus victor Devyatkin, 2003
- Celaenorrhinus leucocera (Kollar, [1844])
- Celaenorrhinus putra sanda Evans, 1941
- Celaenorrhinus munda maculicornis Elews & Edwards, 1897
- Celaenorrhinus nigricans nigricans (de Niceville, 1885)
- Celaenorrhinus asmara (Butler, 1879)

Celaenorrhinus asmara asmara (Butler, 1879)
Celaenorrhinus asmara consertus de Niceville, 1890

- Celaenorrhinus dhanada Moore, 1865

Celaenorrhinus dhanada dhanada Moore, 1865
Celaenorrhinus dhanada affinis Elwes & Edward, 1897

- Celaenorrhinus andamanicus hannaEvans, 1949
- Celaenorrhinus inaequalis irene Evans, 1941
- Celaenorrhinus aurivittatus (Moore, [1879])
- Celaenorrhinus cameroni (Distant, 1882)
- Celaenorrhinus vietnamicus Devyatkin, 1997
- Celaenorrhinus ladana (Butler, 1870)
- Celaenorrhinus ficulnea queda (Plotz, 1885)

genus: Tapena

- Tapena thwaitesi Moore, [1881]

Tapena thwaitesi minuscula Elwes & Edwards, 1897
Tapena thwaitesi bornea Evans, 1931

genus: Darpa

- Darpa hanria Moore, [1866]
- Darpa striata (H.Druce, 1873)

Darpa striata striata (H.Druce, 1873)
Darpa striata mintaEvans, 1949

- Darpa inopinata Devyatkin, 2001
- Darpa pteria dealbata (Distant, 1886)

genus: Odina

- Odina decoratus (Hewitson, 1867)
- Odina hieroglyphica ortygia de Niceville, [1896]

genus: Pseudocoladenia

- Pseudocoladenia dan (Fabricius, 1787)

Pseudocoladenia dan dhyan (Fruhstorfer, 1909)
Pseudocoladenia dan fabia (Evans, 1949)

- Pseudocoladenia festa (Evans, 1949)

genus: Coladenia

- Coladenia indrani uposathra Fruhstorfer, 1911
- Coladenia agni (de Niceville, [1884])

Coladenia agni agni (de Niceville, [1884])
Coladenia agni sundae de Jong, 1992

- Coladenia tanya Devyatkin, 2002
- Coladenia agnioides Elwes & Edwards, 1897
- Coladenia buchananii (de Niceville, 1889)
- Coladenia laxmi (de Niceville, [1889])

Coladenia laxmi laxmi (de Niceville, [1889])
Coladenia laxmi sobrina Elwes & Edwards, 1897

- Coladenia hoenei Evans, 1939
- Coladenia koiwayai Maruyama & Uehara, 2008

genus: Sarangesa

- Sarangesa dasahara dasahara (Moore, [1866])

genus: Satarupa

- Satarupa zulla ourvardi Oberthur, 1921

genus: Seseria

- Seseria sambara (Moore, [1866])

Seseria sambara sambara (Moore, [1866])
Seseria sambara indosinica (Fruhstorfer, 1909)

- Seseria dohertyi salex Evans, 1949
- Seseria strigata Evans, 1926
- Seseria affinis kirmana (Plotz, 1885)

genus: Pintara

- Pintara capiloides Devyatkin, 1998
- Pintara bowringi colorata Devyatkin, 1998
- Pintara tabrica (Hewitson, [1873])
- Pintara pinwilli pinwilli (Butler, [1879])
- Pintara prasobsuki (Ek-Amnuay, 2006)

Pintara prasobsuki prasobsuki (Ek-Amnuay, 2006)
Pintara prasobsuki lao Maruyama & Uehara, 2008

genus: Chamunda

- Chamunda chamunda (Moore, [1866])

genus: Gerosis

- Gerosis sinica (Felder & Felder, 1862)

Gerosis sinica narada (Moore, 1884)
Gerosis sinica minima (Swinhoe, 1912)

- Gerosis phisara phisara (Moore, 1884)
- Gerosis bhagava bhagava (Moore, [1866])
- Gerosis limax dirae (de Niceville, 1895)
- Gerosis tristis (Eliot, 1959)

Gerosis tristis tristis (Eliot, 1959)
Gerosis tristis gaudialis Devyatkin, 2001

genus: Tagiades

- Tagiades japetus (Stoll, [1781])

Tagiades japetus atticus (Fabricius, 1793)
Tagiades japetus ravi (Moore, [1866])

- Tagiades gana (Moore, [1866])

Tagiades gana gana (Moore, [1866])
Tagiades gana meetana Moore, [1879]
Tagiades gana sangarava Fruhstorfer, 1910

- Tagiades parra Fruhstorfer, 1910

Tagiades parra gala Evans, 1949
Tagiades parra naxos Evans, 1949

- Tagiades hybridus Devyatkin, 2001
- Tagiades lavatus Butler, [1879]
- Tagiades calligana Butler, [1879]
- Tagiades toba toba de Niceville, [1896]
- Tagiades vajuna vajuna Fruhstorfer, 1910
- Tagiades ultra Evans, 1932
- Tagiades menaka menaka (Moore, [1866])
- Tagiades cohaerens cynthia Evans, 1934

genus: Mooreana

- Mooreana trichoneura (Felder & Feler, 1860)

Mooreana trichoneura trichoneura (Felder & Feler, 1860)
Mooreana trichoneura pralaya (Moore, [1866])

genus: Ctenoptilum

- Ctenoptilum vasava vasava (Moore, [1866])
- Ctenoptilum multiguttatum de Niceville, 1890

genus: Odontoptilum

- Odontoptilum angulata angulata (C.Felder, 1862)
- Odontoptilum pygela pygela (Hewitson, [1868])

genus: Caprona

- Caprona agama agama (Moore, [1858])
- Caprona alida alida (de Niceville, 1891)

== Family Papilionidae ==
subfamily: Parnassiinae

genus: Bhutanitis

- Bhutanitis lidderdalei ocellatomaculata

subfamily: Papilioninae

tribe: Leptocircini

genus: Meandrusa

- Meandrusa lachinus (Fruhstorfer, [1902])

Meandrusa lachinus aribbas (Fruhstorfer, 1909)
Meandrusa lachinus nagamasai Okano, 1986
Meandrusa lachinus sukkiti Nakano, 1995
Meandrusa lachinus helenusoides Funahashi, 2003

- Meandrusa payeni Boisduval, 1836

Meandrusa payeni langsonensis (Fruhstorfer, 1901)
Meandrusa payeni ciminius (Fruhstrofer, 1909)

- Meandrusa sciron hajiangensis Funahashi, 2003

genus: Teinopalpus

- Teinopalpus imperialis imperatrix de Niceville, 1899
- Teinopalpus aureus Mell, 1923

Teinopalpus aureus eminens Turlin, 1991
Teinopalpus aureus shinkaii Morita, 1998
Teinopalpus aureus laotiana Collard, 2007

genus: Graphium

- Graphium empedovana empedovana (Corbet, 1941)
- Graphium cloanthus cloanthus (Westwood, 1841)
- Graphium sarpedon sarpedon (Linnaeus, 1758)

Graphium sarpedon islander Monastyrskii, 2012
Graphium sarpedon luctatius Fruhstorfer, 1907

- Graphium doson (Felder & Felder, 1864)

Graphium doson axion (Felder & Felder, 1864)
Graphium doson evemonides (Honrath, 1884)
Graphium doson kajanga (Corbet, 1937)
Graphium doson robinson Monastyrskii, 2012

- Graphium evemon (Boisduval, 1836)

Graphium evemon albociliatis (Fruhstorfer, 1901)
Graphium evemon eventus (Fruhstorfer, 1907)

- Graphium eurypylus (Linnaeus, 1758)

Graphium eurypylus mecisteus (Distant, 1885)
Graphium eurypylus acheron (Moore, 1885)

- Graphium bathycles bathycloides (Honrath, 1884)
- Graphium chironides chironides (Honrath, 1884)

Graphium chironides malayanum Eliot, 1982

- Graphium leechi (Rothschild, 1895)
- Graphium agamemnon agamemnon (Linnaeus, 1758)
- Graphium arycles (Boisduval, 1836)

Graphium arycles arycles (Boisduval, 1836)
Graphium arycles sphinx (Fruhstorfer, 1899)

- Graphium agetes agetes (Westwood, 1843)

Graphium agetes iponus (Fruhstorfer, 1902)

- Graphium nomius swinhoei (Moore, 1878)
- Graphium aristeus hermocrates (Felder & Felder, 1865)
- Graphium antiphates pompilius (Fabricius, 1787)

Graphium antiphates itamputi (Butler, 1885)
Graphium antiphates pulauensis (Eliot, 1983)

- Graphium phidias (Oberthur, 1906)
- Graphium macareus (Godart, 1819)

Graphium macareus perakensis (Fruhstorfer, 1899)
Graphium macareus indochinensis (Fruhstorfer, 1901)
Graphium macareus burmensis Moonen, 1984
Graphium macareus macaristus (Grose-Smith, 1887)

- Graphium xenocles (Doubleday, 1842)

Graphium xenocles kephisos (Fruhstorfer, 1902)
Graphium xenocles lindos (Fruhstorfer, 1902)

- Graphium megarus megapenthes (Fruhstorfer, 1902)

Graphium megarus tiomanensis (Eliot, 1978)

- Graphium ramaceus pendleburyi (Corbet, 1941)
- Graphium delesserti delesserti (Guerin-Meneville, 1839)
- Graphium eurous (Leech, 1893)

Graphium eurous inthanon Katayama, 1986

- Graphium mandarinus (Oberthur, 1879)

Graphium mandarinus mandarinus (Oberthur, 1879)
Graphium mandarinus kimurai Murayama, 1982
Graphium mandarinus fangana (Okano, 1986)

- Graphium mullah kooichii (Morita, 1996)

genus: Lamproptera

- Lamproptera curius (Fabricius, 1787)

Lamproptera curius curius (Fabricius, 1787)
Lamproptera curius walkeri (Moore, 1902)

- Lamproptera meges (Zinken, 1831)

Lamproptera meges virescens (Butler, [1870])
Lamproptera meges annamiticus (Fruhstorfer, 1909)

tribe: Papilionini

genus: Papilio

- Papilio agestor agestor Gray, 1831

Papilio agestor shirozui (Igarashi, 1979)

- Papilio epycides Hewitson, [1864]

Papilio epycides hypochra Jordan, 1909
Papilio epycides curiatius Fruhstorfer, 1902
Papilio epycides imitata (Monastyrskii & Devyatkin, 2003)

- Papilio slateri Hewitson, [1859]

Papilio slateri slateri Hewitson, [1859]
Papilio slateri perses de Niceville, 1894
Papilio slateri tavoyanus Butler, 1882
Papilio slateri marginata Oberthür, 1893

- Papilio clytia clytia Linnaeus, 1758
- Papilio paradoxa (Zinken, 1831)

Papilio paradoxa telearchus Hewitson, 1852
Papilio paradoxa aenigma Wallace, 1865

- Papilio elwesi Leech, 1889
- Papilio demoleus Linnaeus, 1758

Papilio demoleus demoleus Linnaeus, 1758
Papilio demoleus malayanus Wallace, 1865

- Papilio machaon verityi Fruhstorfer, 1907

Papilio machaon birmanicus Rothschild, 1908

- Papilio xuthus Linnaeus, 1767
- Papilio demolion demolion Cramer, [1776]
- Papilio noblei de Niceville, [1889]

Papilio noblei haynei Tytler, 1926

- Papilio castor Westwood, 1842

Papilio castor mahadeva Moore, [1879]
Papilio castor mehala Grose-Smith, 1886
Papilio castor dioscurus Jordan, 1909
Papilio castor khmer Boullet & Le Cerf, 1912

- Papilio nephelus Boisduval, 1836

Papilio nephelus ducenarius Fruhstorfer, 1908
Papilio nephelus chaon Westwood, 1845
Papilio nephelus annulus Pendlebury, 1936
Papilio nephelus sunatus Corbet, 1940

- Papilio helenus helenus Linnaeus, 1758
- Papilio iswara iswara White, 1842
- Papilio iswaroides curtisi Jordan, 1909
- Papilio polytes Linnaeus, 1758

Papilio polytes polytes Linnaeus, 1758
Papilio polytes romulus Cramer, [1775]

- Papilio memnon agenor Linnaeus, 1758
- Papilio bootes xamunuensis Tateishi, 2001

Papilio bootes bootes Westwood, 1842

- Papilio alcmenor alcmenor Felder & Felder, 1865
- Papilio protenor euprotenor Fruhstorfer, 1908
- Papilio prexaspes Felder & Felder, [1865]

Papilio prexaspes prexaspes Felder & Felder, 1865
Papilio prexaspes andamanicus Rothschild, 1908
Papilio prexaspes pitmani Elwes & de Niceville, [1887]
Papilio prexaspes duboisi Vitalis, 1914

- Papilio dialis doddsi Janet, 1896

Papilio dialis schanus Jordan, 1909

- Papilio bianor Cramer, [1777]

Papilio bianor gladiator Fruhstorfer, [1902]
Papilio bianor stockleyi Gabriel, 1936
Papilio bianor pinratanai Racheli & Cotton, 1983

- Papilio paris paris Linnaeus, 1758
- Papilio arcturus arcturus Westwood, 1842
- Papilio krishna charlesi Fruhstorfer, 1902

Papilio krishna thawgawa Tytler, 1939

- Papilio palinurus palinurus Fabricius, 1787
- Papilio polyctor significans Fruhstorfer, 1902

tribe: Troidini

genus: Atrophaneura

- Atrophaneura varuna (White, 1842)

Atrophaneura varuna varuna (White, 1842)
Atrophaneura varuna astorion (Westwood, 1842)
Atrophaneura varuna zaleucus (Hewitson, [1865])

- Atrophaneura nox erebus (Wallace, 1865)
- Atrophaneura aidoneus (Doubleday, 1845)
- Atrophaneura sycorax egertoni (Distant, 1886)
- Atrophaneura nevilli (Wood-Mason, 1882)
- Atrophaneura crassipes (Oberthür, 1893)
- Atrophaneura alcinous mansonensis (Fruhstorfer, 1901)

genus: Losaria

- Losaria coon doubledayi (Wallace, 1865)
- Losaria neptunus (Guerin-Meneville, [1840])

Losaria neptunus neptunus (Guerin-Meneville, 1840)
Losaria neptunus manasukkiti Cotton, Racheli & Sukhumalind, 2005

genus: Byasa

- Byasa laos (Riley & Godfrey, 1921)
- Byasa adamsoni (Grose-Smith, 1886)

Byasa adamsoni adamsoni (Grose-Smith, 1886)
Byasa adamsoni takakoae Uehara, 2006

- Byasa crassipes (Oberthür, 1879)
- Byasa dasarada (Moore, 1857)
- Byasa hedistus (Jordan, 1928)
- Byasa latreillei (Donovan, 1826)
- Byasa polyeuctes (Doubleday, 1842)

genus: Trogonoptera

- Trogonoptera brookiana albescens (Rothschild, 1895)

Trogonoptera brookiana trogon (Vollenhoven, 1860)

genus: Troides

- Troides helena cerberus (Felder & Felder, 1865)
- Troides aeacus (Felder & Felder, 1860)

Troides aeacus aeacus (Felder & Felder, 1860)
Troides aeacus malaiianus Fruhstorfer, 1902

- Troides amphrysus ruficollis (Butler, [1879])
- Troides cuneifera paeninsulae (Pendlebury, 1936)

genus: Pachliopta

- Pachliopta aristolochiae (Fabricius, 1775)

Pachliopta aristolochiae asteris (Rothschild, 1908)
Pachliopta aristolochiae goniopeltis (Rothschild, 1908)

== Family Pieridae ==
subfamily: Coliadinae

genus: Catopsilia

- Catopsilia scylla cornelia (Fabricius, 1787)
- Catopsilia pyranthe pyranthe (Linnaeus, 1758)
- Catopsilia pomona pomona (Fabricius, 1775)

genus: Dercas

- Dercas verhuelli (van der Hoeven, 1839)

Dercas verhuelli doubledayi [Moore, 1905]
Dercas verhuelli parva Evans, 1924

- Dercas gobrias herodorus Fruhstorfer, 1910
- Dercas lycorias lycorias (Doubleday, 1842)

genus: Gonepteryx

- Gonepteryx amintha ssp.

genus: Gandaca

- Gandaca harina (Horsfield, [1829])

Gandaca harina burmana [Moore, 1906]
Gandaca harina distanti Fruhstorfer, 1910
Gandaca harina aora Moulton, 1923

genus: Eurema

- Eurema brigitta (Stoll, [1780])

Eurema brigitta senna (Felde & Felder, [1865])
Eurema brigitta hainana (Moore, 1878)

- Eurema laeta pseudolaeta (Moore, 1906)
- Eurema lacteola lacteola (Distant, 1886)
- Eurema hecabe hecabe (Linnaeus, 1758)
- Eurema hecabe contubernalis (Moore, 1886)
- Eurema blanda (Wallace, 1867)

Eurema blanda blanda (Wallace, 1867)
Eurema blanda silhetana (Wallace, 1867)
Eurema blanda snelleni (Moore, [1907])

- Eurema simulatrix Staudinger, 1891

Eurema simulatrix tecmessa (de Niceville, [1896])
Eurema simulatrix sarinoides (Fruhstorfer, 1910)
Eurema simulatrix littorea Morishita, 1968
Eurema simulatrix tiomanica Okubo, 1983

- Eurema sari sodalis (Moore, 1886)
- Eurema andersoni (Moore, 1886)

Eurema andersoni andersoni (Moore, 1886)
Eurema andersoni sadanobui Shirozu & Yata, 1982

- Eurema novapallida Yata, 1992

Eurema novapallida novapallida Yata, 1992
Eurema novapallida phukiwoana Yata & Kimura, 2011

- Eurema nicevillei nicevillei (Butler, 1898)
- Eurema ada Distant & Pryer, 1887

Eurema ada iona (Talbot, 1939)
Eurema ada indosinica Yata, 1991

genus: Colias

- Colias fieldii fieldii Menetries, 1855

subfamily: Pierinae

genus: Leptosia

- Leptosia nina

Leptosia nina nina (Fabricius, 1793)
Leptosia nina malayana Fruhstorfer, 1910

genus: Aporia

- Aporia agathon (Gray, 1831)

Aporia agathon bifurcata Tytler, 1939
Aporia agathon sapaensis Funahashi, 2003

- Aporia gigantea gigantea Koiwawya, 1993

genus: Delias

- Delias agoranis Grose-Smith, 1887
- Delias singhapura singhapura (Wallace, 1867)
- Delias vietnamensis Monastyrskii & Devyatkin, 2000
- Delias patrua shan Talbot, 1937
- Delias lativitta parva Talbot, 1937
- Delias baracasa dives de Nicéville, 1897
- Delias sanaca perspicua Fruhstorfer, 1910
- Delias berinda yedanula Fruhstorfer, 1910

Delias berinda berinda (Moore, 1872)
Delias berinda boyleae Butler, 1885

- Delias belladonna (Fabricius, 1793)

Delias belladonna belladonna (Fabricius, 1793)
Delias belladonna hedybia Jordan, 1925
Delias belladonna endoi Yagishita, 1993
Delias belladonna yukaae Nakano, 1993
Delias belladonna malayana Pendlebury, 1933

- Delias pasithoe (Linnaeus, 1767)

Delias pasithoe pasithoe (Linnaeus, 1767)
Delias pasithoe parthenope (Wallace, 1867)
Delias pasithoe beata Fruhstorfer, 1905
Delias pasithoe thyra Fruhstorfer, 1905

- Delias acalis (Godart, 1819)

Delias acalis pyramus (Wallace, 1867)
Delias acalis perakana Talbot, 1928
Delias acalis shinkaii Morita, 1998

- Delias ninus ninus (Wallace, 1867)
- Delias descombesi (Boisduval, 1836)

Delias descombesi descombesi (Boisduval, 1836)
Delias descombesi eranthos Fruhstorfer, 1905

- Delias agostina (Hewitson, 1852)

Delias agostina agostina (Hewitson, [1852])
Delias agostina annamitica Fruhstorfer, 1901
Delias agostina johnsoni Corbet, 1933

- Delias hyparete Linnaeus, 1758

Delias hyparete indica (Wallace, 1867)
Delias hyparete metarete Butler, [1879]

- Delias georgina tahanica Rothschild, 1925

Delias georgina orphne (Wallace, 1867)
Delias georgina zenobia Pendlebury, 1939
Delias georgina keda Talbot, [1937]

genus: Cepora

- Cepora nerissa (Fabricius, 1775)

Cepora nerissa nerissa (Fabricius, 1775)
Cepora nerissa dapha (Moore, [1879])

- Cepora nadina nadina (Lucas, 1852)

Cepora nadina andersoni (Distant, 1885)

- Cepora iudith (Fabricius, 1787)

Cepora iudith lea (Doubleday, 1846)
Cepora iudith malaya (Fruhstorfer, 1899)
Cepora iudith siamensis (Butler, 1899)
Cepora iudith talboti Corbet, 1937

genus: Prioneris

- Prioneris philonome (Boisduval, 1836)

Prioneris philonome clemanthe (Doubleday, 1846)
Prioneris philonome themana Fruhstorfer, 1903

- Prioneris thestylis thestylis (Doubleday, 1842)

Prioneris thestylis malaccana Fruhstorfer, 1899

genus: Appias

- Appias olferna olferna Swinhoe, 1890
- Appias lyncida (Cramer, [1779])

Appias lyncida eleonora (Boisduval, 1836)
Appias lyncida vasava Fruhstorfer, 1910

- Appias nero figulina (Butler, 1867)
- Appias galba (Wallace, 1867)
- Appias albina albina (Boisduval, 1836)

Appias albina darada (Felder & Felder, [1865])

- Appias paulina (Cramer, [1777])

Appias paulina adamsoni (Moore, 1905)
Appias paulina distanti (Moore, 1905)
Appias paulina griseoides Moulton, 1923
Appias paulina grisea Moulton, 1923

- Appias indra (Moore, [1858])

Appias indra indra (Moore, [1858])
Appias indra plana Butler, 1879
Appias indra thronion Fruhstorfer, 1910

- Appias pandione lagela Moore, [1879]
- Appias lalage lalage (Doubleday, 1842)
- Appias cardena perakana (Fruhstorfer, 1902)
- Appias lalassis Grose-Smith, 1887

Appias lalassis indroides (Honrath, [1890])

genus: Saletara

- Saletara liberia distanti Butler, 1898

genus: Udaiana

- Udaiana cynis cynis (Hewitson, [1866])

genus: Pieris

- Pieris brassicae nepalensis Gray, 1846
- Pieris melete montana Verity, 1908
- Pieris naganum (Moore, 1884)

Pieris naganum pamsi Vitalis de Salvaza

genus: Artogeia

- Artogeia rapae crucivora (Boisduval, 1836)
- Artogeia canidia canidia (Sparrman, 1768)
- Artogeia erutae montana (Verity, 1911)

genus: Talbotia

- Talbotia naganum pamsi (Vitalis de Salvaza, 1921)

genus: Pontia

- Pontia edusa moorei (Rober, [1907])

genus: Ixias

- Ixias pyrene (Linnaeus, 1764)

Ixias pyrene verna H.Druce, 1874
Ixias pyrene yunnanensis Fruhstorfer, 1902
Ixias pyrene latifasciata Butler, 1871
Ixias pyrene birdi Distant, 1883
Ixias pyrene alticola Pendlebury, 1933

genus: Hebomoia

- Hebomoia glaucippe glaucippe (Linnaeus, 1758)

Hebomoia glaucippe aturia Fruhstorfer, 1910
Hebomoia glaucippe anomala Pendlebury, 1939
Hebomoia glaucippe theia Nishimura, 1987

genus: Pareronia

- Pareronia avatar (Moore, [1858])
- Pareronia hippia (Fabricius, 1787)
- Pareronia paravatar Bingham, 1907
- Pareronia anais anais (Lesson, 1837)
- Pareronia valeria lutescens (Butler, 1879)

genus: Phrissura

- Phrissura aegis cynis (Hewitson, [1866])

Phrissura aegis pryeri (Distant, 1885)

== Family Riodinidae ==
genus: Abisara

- Abisara abnormis Moore, [1884]
- Abisara bifasciata Moore, 1877

Abisara bifasciata angulata Moore, [1879]
Abisara bifasciata angustilineata Inoue & Kawazoe, 1964

- Abisara burnii (de Niceville, 1895)

Abisara burnii burnii (de Niceville, 1895)
Abisara burnii timaeus (Fruhstorfer, [1904])

- Abisara echerius (Stoll, [1790])

Abisara echerius echerius (Stoll, [1790])
Abisara echerius paionea Fruhstorfer, [1914]
Abisara echerius notha Bennett, 1950

- Abisara freda freda Bennett, 1957
- Abisara fylla fylla (Westwood, [1851])
- Abisara fylloides magdala Fruhstorfer, [1904]
- Abisara geza niya Fruhstorfer, [1914]
- Abisara kausambi kausambi Felder & Felder, 1860
- Abisara miyazakii K. & T. Saito, 2005

Abisara miyazakii miyazakii K. & T.Saito, 2005
Abisara miyazakii shigehoi K. & T.Saito, 2005

- Abisara neophron (Hewitson, [1861])

Abisara neophron chelina (Fruhstorfer, [1904])
Abisara neophron gratius Fruhstorfer, 1912

- Abisara saturata (Moore, 1878)

Abisara saturata meta Fruhstorfer, [1904]
Abisara saturata maya Bennett, 1950
Abisara saturata kausambioides de Niceville, [1896]

- Abisara savitri albisticta K. and T.Saito, 2005

genus: Dodona

- Dodona adonira adonira Hewitson, [1866]
- Dodona deodata Hewitson, 1876

Dodona deodata deodata Hewitson, 1876
Dodona deodata lecerfi Fruhstorfer, [1914]

- Dodona dipoea dracon de Niceville, 1897
- Dodona durga rubula Fruhstorfer, [1914]
- Dodona egeon egeon (Westwood, [1851])
- Dodona eugenes venox Fruhstorfer, 1912

Dodona eugenes chaseni Corbet, 1941

- Dodona katerina Monastyrskii & Devyatkin, 2000

Dodona katerina katerina Monastyrskii & Devyatkin, 2000
Dodona katerina sombra Monastyrskii & Devyatkin, 2003

- Dodona maculosa phuongi Monastyrskii & Devyatkin, 2000
- Dodona ouida ouida Hewitson, [1866]
- Dodona speciosa Monastyrskii & Devyatkin, 2000

genus: Laxita

- Laxita thuisto (Hewitson, [1861])

Laxita thuisto thuisto (Hewitson, [1861])
Laxita thuisto ephorus (Fruhstorfer, [1904])

genus: Paralaxita

- Paralaxita damajanti damajanti (Felder and Felder, 1860)
- Paralaxita orphna laocoon (de Niceville, 1894)
- Paralaxita telesia (Hewitson, [1861])

Paralaxita telesia lyclene (de Niceville, 1894)
Paralaxita telesia boulleti (Fruhstorfer, [1914])

- Paralaxita dora (Fruhstorfer, 1904)

genus: Stiboges

- Stiboges nymphidia Butler, 1876

Stiboges nymphidia nymphidia Butler, 1876
Stiboges nymphidia elodinia Fruhstorfer, [1914]

genus: Taxila

- Taxila haquinus (Fabricius, 1793)

Taxila haquinus haquinus (Fabricius, 1793)
Taxila haquinus fasciata Moore, [1879]
Taxila haquinus berthae Fruhstorfer, [1904]

genus: Zemeros

- Zemeros flegyas (Cramer, [1780])

Zemeros flegyas flegyas (Cramer, [1780])
Zemeros flegyas allica (Fabricius, 1787)
Zemeros flegyas albipunctatus Butler, 1874

- Zemeros emesoides emesoides Felder & Felder, 1860

== Family Lycaenidae ==
subfamily: Poritiinae

genus: Cyaniriodes

- Cyaniriodes libna andersonii (Moore, 1884)

genus: Deramas

- Deramas cham Saito & Seki, 2006
- Deramas jasoda jasoda (de Niceville, [1889])
- Deramas livens Distant, 1886
- Deramas livens evansi Eliot, 1964
- Deramas nelvis nelvis Eliot, 1964
- Deramas nolens pasteuri Eliot, 1978

genus: Poritia

- Poritia erycinoides (Felder &Felder, 1865)

Poritia erycinoides phraatica Hewitson, [1878]
Poritia erycinoides trishna Fruhstorfer, 1919

- Poritia hewitsoni Moore, [1866]

Poritia hewitsoni tavoyana Doherty, 1889
Poritia hewitsoni regia Doherty, 1889

- Poritia karennia Evans, 1921
- Poritia manilia Fruhstorfer, [1912]

Poritia manilia dawna Evans, 1921
Poritia manilia evansi Corbet, 1940

- Poritia philota philota Hewitson, 1874
- Poritia plateni Staudinger, 1889
- Poritia pleurata Hewitson, 1874
- Poritia sumatrae sumatrae (Felder& Felder, 1865)

genus: Simiskina

- Simiskina pasira (Moulton, [1912])
- Simiskina pavonica veturia (Fruhstorfer, [1912])
- Simiskina pediada (Hewitson, 1877)
- Simiskina phalena (Hewitson, 1874)

Simiskina phalena phalena (Hewitson, 1874)
Simiskina phalena harterti (Doherty, 1889)

- Simiskina phalia potina (Hewitson, 1874)
- Simiskina pharyge deolina (Fruhstorfer, 1917)
- Simiskina pheretia pheretia (Hewitson, 1874)
- Simiskina proxima dohertyi Evans, 1925

subfamily: Curetinae

genus: Curetis

- Curetis acuta dentata Moore, 1879
- Curetis bulis bulis (Westwood, [1851])

Curetis bulis stigmata (Moore, 1879)

- Curetis felderi Distant, 1884
- Curetis freda Eliot, 1959
- Curetis insularis (Horsfield, [1829])
- Curetis naga Evans, 1954
- Curetis regula Evans, 1954
- Curetis santana malayica (Felder & Felder, 1865)
- Curetis saronis indosinica Fruhstorfer, 1908

Curetis saronis gloriosa Moore, [1884]
Curetis saronis sumatrana Corbet, 1937

- Curetis sperthis sperthis (Felder & Felder, 1865)

Curetis sperthis metayei Inoue & Kawazoe, 1965
Curetis sperthis kawazoei Okubo, 1983

- Curetis tagalica (Felder & Felder, 1862)

Curetis tagalica jopa Fruhstorfer, 1908
Curetis tagalica vietnamica Inoue & Kawazoe, 1964

- Curetis thetis (Drury, [1773])
- Curetis tonkina Evans, 1954

Curetis tonkina tonkina Evans, 1954
Curetis tonkina metayet Inoue & Kawazoe, 1964

subfamily: Lycaeninae

genus: Heliophorus

- Heliophorus androcles rubida Riley, 1929
- Heliophorus brahma Moore, [1858]

Heliophorus brahma mogoka Evans, 1932
Heliophorus brahma major Evans, 1932

- Heliophorus delacouri Eliot, 1963
- Heliophorus epicles (Godart, [1842])

Heliophorus epicles latilimbata (Fruhstorfer, 1908)
Heliophorus epicles phoenicoparyphus (Holland, 1878)

- Heliophorus eventa Fruhstorfer, 1918
- Heliophorus ila (de Niceville, [1896])

Heliophorus ila nolus Eliot, 1963
Heliophorus ila chinensis (Fruhstorfer, 1908)

- Heliophorus indicus (Fruhstorfer, 1908)
- Heliophorus kohimensis elioti Yago, Saigusa & Nakanishi, 2002
- Heliophorus smaragdinus Yago & Monastyrskii, 2002

genus: Helleia

- Helleia tseng sonephetae Wakahara, Miyamoto & Nakamura, 2008

subfamily: Miletinae

tribe: Miletini

genus: Miletus

- Miletus ancon ancon (Doherty, 1889)
- Miletus archilochus archilochus (Fruhstorfer, 1913)

Miletus archilochus siamensis (Godfrey, 1916)

- Miletus biggsii biggsii (Distant, 1884)
- Miletus chinensis learchus Felder & Felder, [1865]
- Miletus croton (Doherty, 1889)

Miletus croton croton (Doherty, 1889)
Miletus croton corus Eliot, 1961

- Miletus gallus gallus (de Niceville, 1894)
- Miletus gigantes (de Niceville, 1894)
- Miletus gopara gopara (de Niceville, 1890)
- Miletus mallus (Fruhstorfer, 1913)

Miletus mallus mallus (Fruhstorfer, 1913)
Miletus mallus shania (Evans, 1932)

- Miletus nymphis fictus Corbet, 1939
- Miletus symethus petronius (Distant& Pryer, 1887)

genus: Allotinus

- Allotinus corbeti Eliot, 1956
- Allotinus davidis Eliot, 1959
- Allotinus drumila aphthonius Fruhstorfer, 1914
- Allotinus fallax apeus de Niceville, 1895
- Allotinus horsfieldi permagnus Fruhstorfer, 1913
- Allotinus leogoron leogoron Furhstorfer, [1916]
- Allotinus sarrastes Fruhstorfer, 1913
- Allotinus strigatus malayanus Corbet, 1939
- Allotinus subviolaceus subviolaceus Felder & Felder, [1865]
- Allotinus substrigosus substrigosus (Moore, 1884)
- Allotinus thalebanus Murayama & Kimura, 1990
- Allotinus unicolor Felder & Felder, [1865]

Allotinus unicolor unicolor Felder & Felder, [1865]
Allotinus unicolor rekkia Riley & Godfrey, 1921

genus: Logania

- Logania distanti massalia Doherty, 1891
- Logania malayica malayica Distant, 1884
- Logania marmorata Moore, 1884

Logania marmorata marmorata Moore, 1884
Logania marmorata damis Fruhstorfer, 1914

- Logania regina sriwa Distant, 1886
- Logania watsoniana de Niceville, 1898

tribe: Liphyrini

genus: Liphyra

- Liphyra brassolis brassolis Westwood, [1864]

tribe: Spalgini

genus: Spalgis

- Spalgis epeus epeus (Moore, 1878)
- Spalgis baiongus Cantlie & Norman, 1960

tribe: Tarakini

genus: Taraka

- Taraka hamada hamada (Druce, 1875)

Taraka hamada mendesia Fruhstorfer, 1918

- Taraka mahanetra Doherty, 1890

subfamily: Polyommatinae

genus: Castalius

- Castalius rosimon rosimon (Fabricius, 1775)

genus: Tarucus

- Tarucus callinara Butler, 1886
- Tarucus waterstradti dharta Bethune-Baker, [1918]
- Tarucus ananda de Niceville, [1884]

genus: Lampides

- Lampides boeticus (Linnaeus, 1767)

genus: Caleta

- Caleta roxus (Godart, [1842])

Caleta roxus roxana (de Niceville, 1897)
Caleta roxus pothus (Fruhstorfer, 1918)

- Caleta elna noliteia (Fruhstorfer, 1918)

Caleta elna elvira (Fruhstorfer, 1918)

- Caleta decidia decidia (Hewitson, [1876])

genus: Discolampa

- Discolampa ethion (Westwood, [1851])
- Discolampa ethion ethion (Westwood, [1851])

Discolampa ethion thalimar (Fruhstorfer, [1922])

genus: Nothodanis

- Nothodanis schaeffera annamensis (Fruhstorfer, 1913)

genus: Everes

- Everes argiades diporides Chapman, 1909
- Everes huegelii dipora (Moore, 1865)
- Everes lacturnus lacturnus (Godart, [1824])

genus: Talicada

- Talicada metana Riley & Godfrey, 1921
- Talicada nyseus (Guerin-Menevill, [1843])

Talicada nyseus annamitica Seitz, [1923]
Talicada nyseus burmana Evans, 1925
Talicada nyseus macbethi Riley, 1932

genus: Azanus

- Azanus urios Riley & Godfrey, 1921

genus: Tongeia

- Tongeia amplifascia Huang, 2001
- Tongeia ion (Leech, 1891)
- Tongeia potanini Alpheraky, 1889

Tongeia potanini umbriel (Doherty, 1889)
Tongeia potanini glycon Corbet, 1940

genus: Shijimia

- Shijimia moorei moorei (Leech, 1889)

genus: Bothrinia

- Bothrinia chennellii celastroides Shirozu & Saigusa, 1962

genus: Pithecops

- Pithecops corvus Fruhstorfer, [1919]

Pithecops corvus corvus Fruhstorfer, [1919]
Pithecops corvus correctus Cowan, 1966

- Pithecops fulgens fulgens Doherty, 1889

genus: Lycaenopsis

- Lycaenopsis haraldus (Fabricius, 1787)

Lycaenopsis haraldus haraldus (Fabricius, 1787)
Lycaenopsis haraldus renonga Riley, 1932
Lycaenopsis haraldus annamitica Eliot and Kawazoe, 1983

genus: Megisba

- Megisba malaya sikkima Moore, 1884

genus: Neopithecops

- Neopithecops zalmora zalmora (Butler, [1870])

genus: Cebrella

- Cebrella pellecebra pellecebra (Fruhstorfer, 1910)

genus: Lestranicus

- Lestranicus transpectus (Moore, 1879)

genus: Udara

- Udara albocaerulea albocaerulea (Moore, 1879)
- Udara dilecta dilecta (Moore, 1879)
- Udara placidula howarthi (Cantlie & Norman, 1960)
- Udara cyma cyma (Toxopeus, 1927)
- Udara akasa sadanobui Eliot & Kawazoe, 1983
- Udara selma cerima (Corbet, 1937)

genus: Plautella

- Plautella cossaea pambui (Eliot, 1973)

genus: Acytolepis

- Acytolepis lilacea indochinensis Eliot & Kawazoe, 1983
- Acytolepis puspa (Horsfield, [1828])

Acytolepis puspa lambi (Distant, 1882)
Acytolepis puspa gisca (Fruhstorfer, 1910)

genus: Celatoxia

- Celatoxia marginata (de Niceville, [1884])

Celatoxia marginata marginata (de Niceville, [1884])
Celatoxia marginata splendens (Butler, 1900)

genus: Celastrina

- Celastrina argiolus iynteana (de Niceville, [1884])
- Celastrina lavendularis (Moore, 1877)

Celastrina lavendularis limbata (Moore, 1879)
Celastrina lavendularis isabella Corbet, 1937

- Celastrina oreas yunnana Eliot & Kawazoe, 1983
- Callenya lenya lenya (Evans, 1932)
- Callenya melaena melaena (Doherty, 1899)

genus: Monodontides

- Monodontides musina (Snellen, 1892)

Monodontides musina musinoides (Swinhoe, 1910)
Monodontides musina pelides (Fruhstorfer, 1910)

genus: Zizina

- Zizina otis (Fabricius, 1787)

Zizina otis sangra (Moore, [1866])
Zizina otis lampa (Corbet, 1940)

genus: Zizeeria

- Zizeeria karsandra (Moore, 1865)
- Zizeeria maha maha (Kollar, [1844])

genus: Zizula

- Zizula hylax hylax (Fabricius, 1775)

Zizula hylax hylax (Fabricius, 1775)
Zizula hylax pygmaea (Snellen, 1876)

genus: Famegana

- Famegana alsulus eggletoni (Corbet, 1941)

genus: Chilades

- Chilades lajus (Stoll, [1780])

Chilades lajus lajus (Stoll, [1780])
Chilades lajus tavoyanus Evans, 1925

genus: Luthrodes

- Luthrodes pandava pandava (Horsfield, [1829])

genus: Freyeria

- Freyeria trochylus orientalis Forster, 1980
- Freyeria putli (Kollar, [1844])

genus: Euchrysops

- Euchrysops cnejus (Fabricius, 1798)

genus: Catochrysops

- Catochrysops panormus exiguus (Distant, 1886)
- Catochrysops strabo strabo (Fabricius, 1793)

genus: Lampides

- Lampides boeticus (Linnaeus, 1767)

genus: Leptotes

- Leptotes plinius (Fabricius, 1793)

genus: Jamides

- Jamides abdul abdul (Distant, 1886)
- Jamides alecto (C.Felder, 1860)

Jamides alecto alocina Swinhoe, 1915
Jamides alecto ageladas (Fruhstorfer, 1915)

- Jamides bochus (Stoll, [1782])

Jamides bochus bochus (Stoll, [1782])
Jamides bochus nabonassar (Fruhstorfer, [1916])

- Jamides caeruleus caeruleus (H.Druce, 1873)
- Jamides celeno (Cramer, [1775])

Jamides celeno celeno (Cramer, [1775])
Jamides celeno aelianus (Fabricius, 1793)

- Jamides cyta minna Riley & Corbet, 1938
- Jamides elpis pseudelpis (Butler, [1879])
- Jamides ferrari evansi Riley & Corbet, 1938
- Jamides malaccanus malaccanus (Rober, [1886])
- Jamides parasaturatus paramalaccanus Riley & Corbet, 1938
- Jamides philatus subditus (Moore, 1886)
- Jamides pura pura (Moore, 1886)
- Jamides talinga (Kheil, 1884)
- Jamides virgulatus nisanca (Fruhstorfer, 1915)
- Jamides zebra lakatti Corbet, 1940

genus: Caerulea

- Caerulea coeligena (Oberthuer, 1876)

genus: Nacaduba

- Nacaduba angusta (H.Druce, 1873)

Nacaduba angusta kerriana Distant, 1886
Nacaduba angusta albida Riley & Godfrey, 1925

- Nacaduba berenice (Herrich-Schaffer, 1869)

Nacaduba berenice aphya Fruhstorfer, 1916
Nacaduba berenice icena Fruhstorfer, 1916

- Nacaduba beroe (Felder & Felder, 1865)

Nacaduba beroe gythion Fruhstorfer, 1916
Nacaduba beroe neon Fruhstorfer, 1916

- Nacaduba calauria malayica Corbet, 1938
- Nacaduba kurava (Moore, [1858])

Nacaduba kurava euplea Fruhstorfer, 1916
Nacaduba kurava nemana Fruhstorfer, 1916

- Nacaduba hermus (C.Felder, 1860)

Nacaduba hermus nabo Fruhstorfer, 1916
Nacaduba hermus swatipa Corbet, 1938

- Nacaduba pactolus continentalis Fruhstorfer, 1916
- Nacaduba pavana vajuva Fruhstorfer, 1916
- Nacaduba russelli Tite, 1963
- Nacaduba sanaya naevia Toxopeus, 1929
- Nacaduba subperusia lysa Fruhstorfer, 1916

genus: Ionolyce

- Ionolyce helicon merguiana (Moore, 1884)

genus: Prosotas

- Prosotas aluta (H.Druce, 1873)

Prosotas aluta coelestis (Wood-Mason & de Niceville, [1887])
Prosotas aluta nanda (de Niceville, 1895)

- Prosotas bhutea bhutea (de Niceville, [1884])
- Prosotas dubiosa (Semper, [1879])

Prosotas dubiosa indica (Evans, 1925)
Prosotas dubiosa lumpura (Corbet, 1938)

- Prosotas gracilis ni (de Niceville, 1902)
- Prosotas lutea sivoka (Evans, 1910)
- Prosotas nora Felder & Felder, 1860

Prosotas nora ardates (Moore, [1875])
Prosotas nora superdates (Fruhstorfer, [1916])

- Prosotas noreia hampsoni (de Niceville, 1885)
- Prosotas pia marginata Tite, 1963

genus: Catopyrops

- Catopyrops ancyra aberrans (Elwes, [1893])

genus: Petrelaea

- Petrelaea dana (de Niceville, [1884])

genus: Una

- Una usta usta (Distant, 1886)

genus: Orthomiella

- Orthomiella pontis (Elwes, 1887)

Orthomiella pontis pontis (Elwes, 1887)
Orthomiella pontis fukienensis Forster, 1941

- Orthomiella rantaizana rovorea (Fruhstorfer, 1918)

genus: Niphanda

- Niphanda asialis (de Niceville, 1895)
- Niphanda cymbia cymbia de Niceville, [1884]
- Niphanda tessellata tessellata Moore, [1875]

genus: Anthene

- Anthene emolus (Godart, [1824])

Anthene emolus emolus (Godart, [1824])
Anthene emolus goberus (Fruhstorfer, 1916)

- Anthene licates dusuntua Corbet, 1940
- Anthene lycaenina (R.Felder, 1868)

Anthene lycaenina lycambes (Hewitson, [1878])
Anthene lycaenina miya (Fruhstorfer, 1916)

subfamily: Aphnaeinae

genus: Cigaritis

- Cigaritis evansii ayuthia (Murayama & Kimura, 1990)
- Cigaritis gigas Saito & Seki, 2008
- Cigaritis kuyaniana (Matsumura, 1919)
- Cigaritis learmondi (Tytler, 1940)
- Cigaritis leechi (Swinhoe, 1912)

Cigaritis leechi leechi (Swinhoe, 1912)
Cigaritis leechi arooni (Murayama & Kimura, 1990)

- Cigaritis lohita (Horsfield, [1829])

Cigaritis lohita himalayanus (Moore, 1884)
Cigaritis lohita senama (Fruhstorfer, [1912])
Cigaritis lohita panasa (Fruhstorfer, [1912])

- Cigaritis masaeae (Seki, 2000)
- Cigaritis maximus (Elwes, [1893])
- Cigaritis miyamotoi Saito & Seki, 2008
- Cigaritis rukma (de Niceville, [1889])
- Cigaritis seliga (Fruhstorfer, [1912]) seliga (Fruhstorfer, [1912])
- Cigaritis syama (Horsfield, [1829])

Cigaritis syama peguanus (Moore, 1884)
Cigaritis syama terana (Fruhstorfer, [1912])
Cigaritis syama sepulveda (Fruhstorfer, [1912])

- Cigaritis vixinga davidsoni (Talbot, 1936)
- Cigaritis vulcanus tavoyana (Evans, 1925)

subfamily: Theclinae

tribe: Luciini

genus: Hypochrysops

- Hypochrysops coelisparsus kerri Riley, 1932

tribe: Loxurini

genus: Drina

- Drina donina donina (Hewitson, [1865])
- Drina maneia (Hewitson, [1863])

genus: Neomyrina

- Neomyrina nivea hiemalis (Godman & Salvin, 1878)

genus: Loxura

- Loxura atymnus (Stoll, [1780])

Loxura atymnus continentalis Fruhstorfer, [1912]
Loxura atymnus fuconius Fruhstorfer, [1912]

- Loxura cassiopeia cassiopeia Distant, 1884

genus: Yasoda

- Yasoda tripunctata (Hewitson, [1863])

Yasoda tripunctata tripunctata (Hewitson, [1863])
Yasoda tripunctata atrinotata Fruhstorfer, [1912]

- Yasoda pita dohertyi Fruhstorfer, [1912]
- Yasoda androconifera Fruhstorfer, [1912]

genus: Eooxylides

- Eooxylides tharis distanti Riley, 1942

genus: Thamala

- Thamala marciana (Hewitson, [1863])

Thamala marciana marciana (Hewitson, [1863])
Thamala marciana miniata Moore, [1879]
Thamala marciana sarupa Corbet, 1944

tribe: Cheritrini

genus: Cheritra

- Cheritra freja (Fabricius, 1793)

Cheritra freja freja (Fabricius, 1793)
Cheritra freja evansi Cowan, 1965

- Cheritrella truncipennis de Niceville, 1887

genus: Ticherra

- Ticherra acte (Moore, [1858])

Ticherra acte acte (Moore, [1858])
Ticherra acte liviana Fruhstorfer, [1912]

genus: Ahmetia

- Ahmetia achaja (Fruhstorfer, [1912])

Ahmetia achaja achaja (Fruhstorfer, [1912])
Ahmetia achaja jamadai (Saito, 2008)

genus: Drupadia

- Drupadia ravindra (Horsfield, [1828])

Drupadia ravindra moorei (Distant, 1882)
Drupadia ravindra boisduvalii Moore, 1884
Drupadia ravindra corbeti Cowan, 1974

- Drupadia rufotaenia (Fruhstorfer, [1912])

Drupadia rufotaenia rufotaenia (Fruhstorfer, [1912])
Drupadia rufotaenia archbaldi (Evans, 1932)

- Drupadia theda (Felder & Felder, 1862)

Drupadia theda thesmia (Hewitson, [1863])
Drupadia theda fabricii Moore, 1884
Drupadia theda renonga (Corbet, 1938)

- Drupadia niasica scudderii (Doherty, 1889)
- Drupadia estella nicevillei (Doherty, 1889)
- Drupadia scaeva (Hewitson, [1863])

Drupadia scaeva scaeva (Hewitson, [1863])
Drupadia scaeva melisa (Hewitson, [1869])
Drupadia scaeva cooperi (Tytler, 1940)

- Drupadia johorensis (Cowan, 1958)
- Drupadia cinesoides (de Niceville, 1889)

tribe: Amblypodiini

genus: Iraota

- Iraota timoleon timoleon (Stoll, [1790])
- Iraota rochana boswelliana Distant, 1885
- Iraota distanti distanti (Staudinger, 1889)

genus: Amblypodia

- Amblypodia narada taooana Moore, [1879]
- Amblypodia anita anita Hewitson, 1862

tribe: Arhopalini

genus: Arhopala

- Arhopala aberrans (de Niceville, [1889])
- Arhopala abseus (Hewitson, 1862)

Arhopala abseus abseus (Hewitson, 1862)
Arhopala abseus indicus Riley, 1923
Arhopala abseus ophiala Corbet, 1941

- Arhopala ace arata Tytler, 1915
- Arhopala aeeta de Niceville, 1893
- Arhopala amantes amatrix de Niceville, 1891
- Arhopala centaurus nakula (Felder & Felder, 1860)
- Arhopala kinabala H.H.Druce, 1895
- Arhopala similis H.H.Druce, 1895
- Arhopala ijanensis Bethune-Baker, 1897
- Arhopala aedias (Hewitson, 1862)

Arhopala aedias agnis Felder & Felder, [1865]
Arhopala aedias meritatas Corbet, 1941

- Arhopala agaba (Hewitson, 1862)
- Arhopala agelastus (Hewitson, 1862)

Arhopala agelastus agelastus (Hewitson, 1862)
Arhopala agelastus perissa Doherty, 1889

- Arhopala agesilaus gesa Corbet, 1941
- Arhopala agrata de Niceville, 1890

Arhopala agrata agrata de Niceville, 1890
Arhopala agrata binghami Corbet, 1946

- Arhopala aida aida de Niceville, 1889
- Arhopala alaconia media Evans, 1957
- Arhopala alesia sacharja Fruhstorfer, 1914
- Arhopala allata pandora Corbet, 1941
- Arhopala alitaeus mirabella Doherty, 1889
- Arhopala ammon ammon (Hewitson, 1862)
- Arhopala ammonides (Doherty, 1891)

Arhopala ammonides ammonides (Doherty, 1891)

- Arhopala amphimuta (Felder & Felder, 1860)

Arhopala amphimuta amphimuta (Felder & Felder, 1860)
Arhopala amphimuta milleriana Corbet, 1941

- Arhopala anarte anarte (Hewitson, 1862)
- Arhopala anthelus (Westwood, [1852])

Arhopala anthelus anthea (Evans, 1925)
Arhopala anthelus grahami Corbet, 1941

- Arhopala antimuta antimuta Felder & Felder, [1865]
- Arhopala ariana (Evans, 1925)

Arhopala ariana ariana (Evans, 1925)
Arhopala ariana wilcocksi Eliot, 1973

- Arhopala ariel (Doherty, 1891)
- Arhopala aroa esava Corbet, 1941
- Arhopala arvina (Hewitson, [1863])

Arhopala arvina aboe de Niceville, 1895
Arhopala arvina adalitas Corbet, 1941

- Arhopala asopia (Hewitson, [1869])
- Arhopala asinarus Felder & Felder, 1865

Arhopala asinarus asinarus Felder & Felder, [1865]
Arhopala asinarus tounguva (Grose-Smith, 1887)

- Arhopala athada (Staudinger, 1889)

Arhopala athada athada (Staudinger, 1889)
Arhopala athada apha de Niceville, 1895

- Arhopala atosia malayana Bethune-Baker, 1903
- Arhopala atrax (Hewitson, 1862)
- Arhopala aurea (Hewitson, 1862)
- Arhopala aurelia (Evans, 1925)
- Arhopala avatha avatha de Niceville, [1896]
- Arhopala barami woodii Ollenbach, 1921
- Arhopala bazaloides bazaloides (Hewitson, [1878])
- Arhopala bazalus (Hewitson, 1862)

Arhopala bazalus teesta (de Niceville, 1886)
Arhopala bazalus zalinda Corbet, 1941

- Arhopala birmana birmana (Moore, [1884])
- Arhopala buddha cooperi (Evans, 1925)
- Arhopala camdana camdana Corbet, 1941
- Arhopala camdeo Moore, [1858]
- Arhopala delta Evans, 1957
- Arhopala cleander (C.Felder, 1860)

Arhopala cleander regia (Evans, 1925)
Arhopala cleander aphadantas Corbet, 1941

- Arhopala comica de Niceville, 1900
- Arhopala corinda (Hewitson, [1869])

Arhopala corinda acestes de Niceville, 1893
Arhopala corinda corestes Corbet, 1941

- Arhopala democritus (Fabricius, 1793)

Arhopala democritus democritus (Fabricius, 1793)
Arhopala democritus lycaenaria (Felder & Felder, 1860)

- Arhopala dispar dispar Riley & Godfrey, 1921
- Arhopala elopura dama Swinhoe, 1910
- Arhopala epimete duessa Doherty, 1889
- Arhopala epimuta elsiei (Evans, 1925)
- Arhopala eumolphus (Cramer, [1780])

Arhopala eumolphus eumolphus (Cramer, [1780])
Arhopala eumolphus maxwelli (Distant, 1885)

- Arhopala evansi Corbet, 1941
- Arhopala fulla (Hewitson, 1862)

Arhopala fulla ignara Riley & Godfrey, 1921
Arhopala fulla intaca Corbet, 1941

- Arhopala ganesa watsoni Evans, 1912
- Arhopala hellenore hellenore Doherty, 1889
- Arhopala hellada ozana Fruhstorfer, 1914
- Arhopala horsfieldi eurysthenes Fruhstorfer, 1914
- Arhopala hypomuta hypomuta (Hewitson, 1862)
- Arhopala inornata inornata (Felder & Felder, 1860)
- Arhopala khamti Doherty, 1891
- Arhopala labuana Bethune-Baker, 1896
- Arhopala lurida lurida Corbet, 1941
- Arhopala major major (Staudinger, 1889)
- Arhopala metamuta metamuta (Hewitson, [1863])
- Arhopala milleri Corbet, 1941
- Arhopala moolaiana (Moore, [1879])

Arhopala moolaiana maya (Evans, 1932)
Arhopala moolaiana yajuna Corbet, 1941

- Arhopala moorei busa Corbet, 1941
- Arhopala muta (Hewitson, 1862)

Arhopala muta merguiana Corbet, 1941
Arhopala muta maranda Corbet, 1941

- Arhopala myrzala (Hewitson, [1869])

Arhopala myrzala conjuncta Corbet, 1941
Arhopala myrzala lammas Corbet, 1941

- Arhopala nicevillei Bethune-Baker, 1903
- Arhopala norda ronda Eliot, 1992
- Arhopala normani Eliot, 1972
- Arhopala oenea oenea (Hewitson, [1869])
- Arhopala opalina opalina (Moore, [1884])

Arhopala opalina azata de Niceville, [1896]
Arhopala opalina sphendale Fruhstorfer, 1914

- Arhopala paraganesa (de Niceville, 1882)

Arhopala paraganesa zephyretta (Doherty, 1891)
Arhopala paraganesa mendava Corbet, 1941

- Arhopala paralea (Evans, 1925)
- Arhopala paramuta paramuta (de Niceville, [1884])
- Arhopala perimuta (Moore, [1858])

Arhopala perimuta perimuta (Moore, [1858])
Arhopala perimuta regina Corbet, 1941

- Arhopala phaenops sandakani Bethune-Baker, 1896
- Arhopala phanda phanda Corbet, 1941
- Arhopala pseudomuta ariavana Corbet, 1941
- Arhopala rama ramosa (Evans, 1925)
- Arhopala selta selta (Hewitson, [1869])
- Arhopala silhetensis (Hewitson, 1862)

Arhopala silhetensis silhetensis (Hewitson, 1862)
Arhopala silhetensis adorea de Niceville, 1890

- Arhopala singla (de Niceville, 1885)
- Arhopala stinga (Evans, 1957)
- Arhopala sublustris Bethune-Baker, 1904

Arhopala sublustris ralanda Corbet, 1941
Arhopala sublustris ridleyi Corbet, 1941

- Arhopala trogon trogon (Distant, 1884)
- Arhopala varro varro Fruhstorfer, 1914
- Arhopala vihara hirava Corbet, 1941
- Arhopala wildeyana havea Corbet, 1941
- Arhopala zambra zambra Swinhoe, [1911]
- Arhopala zylda elioti Corbet, 1941

genus: Flos

- Flos adriana (de Niceville, [1884])
- Flos anniella (Hewitson, 1862)

Flos anniella anniella (Hewitson, 1862)
Flos anniella artegal Doherty, 1889

- Flos apidanus ahamus Doherty, 1891
- Flos areste (Hewitson, 1862)
- Flos asoka (de Niceville, [1884])
- Flos chinensis chinensis (Felder & Felder, [1865])
- Flos diardi (Hewitson, 1862)

Flos diardi diardi (Hewitson, 1862)
Flos diardi capeta (Hewitson, [1878])

- Flos fulgida (Hewitson, [1863])

Flos fulgida fulgida (Hewitson, [1863])
Flos fulgida singhapura (Distant, 1885)

- Flos morphina morphina (Distant, 1884)

genus: Thaduka

- Thaduka multicaudata multicaudata Moore, [1879]

genus: Mahathala

- Mahathala ameria (Hewitson, 1862)

Mahathala ameria ameria (Hewitson, 1862)
Mahathala ameria hainani Bethune-Baker, 1903
Mahathala ameria burmana Talbot, 1942

- Mahathala ariadeva ariadeva Fruhstorfer, 1908

genus: Apporasa

- Apporasa atkinsoni (Hewitson, [1869])

genus: Semanga

- Semanga superba (H.Druce, 1873)

Semanga superba deliciosa Seitz, [1926]
Semanga superba siamensis Talbot, 1936

genus: Mota

- Mota massyla (Hewitson, [1869])

genus: Surendra

- Surendra quercetorum quercetorum (Moore, [1858])
- Surendra florimel Doherty, 1889
- Surendra vivarna (Horsfield, [1829])

Surendra vivarna amisena (Hewitson, 1862)
Surendra vivarna neritos (Fruhstorfer, 1907)

genus: Zinaspa

- Zinaspa todara (Moore, [1884])

Zinaspa todara karennia (Evans, 1925)

tribe: Catapaecilmatini

genus: Catapaecilma

- Catapaecilma major H.H.Druce, 1895

Catapaecilma major emas (Fruhstorfer, [1912])
Catapaecilma major albicans Corbet, 1941

- Catapaecilma elegans zephyria Fruhstorfer, 1915
- Catapaecilma subochrea Elwes, [1893]

tribe: Deudorigini

genus: Artipe

- Artipe eryx horiella (Matsumura, 1929)

genus: Deudorix

- Deudorix epijarbas menesicles Fruhstorfer, 1911
- Deudorix rapaloides (Naritomi, 1911)
- Deudorix repercussa sankakuhonis Matsumura, 1938

genus: Rapala

- Rapala caerulea liliacea Nire, 1920
- Rapala duma Hewitson, 1878
- Rapala melida nicevillei Swinhoe, 1911
- Rapala nissa hirayamana Matsumura, 1926
- Rapala takasagonis Matsumura, 1929
- Rapala varuna formosana Fruhstorfer, 1911

genus: Sinthusa

- Sinthusa chandrana kuyaniana (Matsumura, 1919)
- Pamela dudgeonii (de Niceville, 1894)

tribe: Eumaeini

genus: Novosatsuma

- Novosatsuma oppocoenosa Johnson, 1992

genus: Satyrium

- Satyrium austrinum (Murayama, 1943)
- Satyrium esakii (Shirozu, 1942)
- Satyrium eximium mushanum (Matsumura, 1929)
- Satyrium formosanum (Matsumura, 1910)
- Satyrium inouei (Shirozu, 1959)
- Satyrium tanakai (Shirozu, 1943)
- Satyrium mackwoodi (Evans, 1914)

genus: Fixsenia

- Fixsenia eximia (Fixsen, 1887)
- Fixsenia yangi (Riley, 1939)
- Fixsenia tateishii Matsumoto, 2006

genus: Ahlbergia

- Ahlbergia pluto (Leech, 1893)

tribe: Horagini

genus: Horaga

- Horaga onyx onyx (Moore, [1858])
- Horaga syrinx moulmeina Moore, [1884]
- Horaga albimacula viola Moore, 1882
- Horaga amethysta purpurescens Corbet, 1941
- Horaga takanamii Seki & Saito, [2004]

tribe: Hypolycaenini

genus: Hypolycaena

- Hypolycaena othona Hewitson, 1865
- Hypolycaena kina inari (Wileman, 1908)

tribe: Iolaini

genus: Britomartis

- Britomartis cleoboides cleoboides (Elwes, [1893])

genus: Bullis

- Bullis buto cowani Corbet, 1940
- Bullis stigmata sylvicola Seki, 1997

genus: Charana

- Charana mandarina mandarina (Hewitson, [1863])

genus: Creon

- Creon cleobis (Godart, [1824])

Creon cleobis cleobis (Godart, [1824])
Creon cleobis queda (Corbet, 1983)

genus: Dacalana

- Dacalana burmana Moore, 1884
- Dacalana cotys (Hewitson, [1865])
- Dacalana cremera ricardi (Eliot, 1959)
- Dacalana inorthodoxa Seki & Saito, 2006
- Dacalana penicilligera (de Niceville, 1890)
- Dacalana sinhara sinhara Fruhstorfer, 1914
- Dacalana vidura azyada (Fruhstorfer, 1914)

genus: Jacoona

- Jacoona anasuja nigerrima Corbet, 1948

genus: Maneca

- Maneca bhotea Moore, 1884

genus: Manto

- Manto hypoleuca terana (Seitz, [1926])

genus: Mantoides

- Mantoides gama gama (Distant, 1886)

genus: Neocheritra

- Neocheritra amrita amrita (Felder & Felder, 1860)
- Neocheritra fabronia fabronia (Hewitson, [1878])

genus: Pratapa

- Pratapa contractus (Leech, 1890)
- Pratapa deva Moore, [1858]

Pratapa deva lila Moore, [1884]
Pratapa deva relata (Distant, 1884)

- Pratapa icetas extensa Evans, 1925
- Pratapa icetoides (Elwes, [1893])

Pratapa icetoides icetoides (Elwes, [1893])
Pratapa icetoides calculis H.H.Druce, 1895

genus: Purlisa

- Purlisa gigantea gigantea (Distant, 1881)

genus: Rachana

- Rachana jalindra (Horsfield, [1829])

Rachana jalindra burbona (Hewitson, [1878])
Rachana jalindra indra (Moore, [1884])

genus: Suasa

- Suasa lisides (Hewitson, [1863])

Suasa lisides lisides (Hewitson, [1863])
Suasa lisides madaura Fruhstorfer, [1912]

genus: Tajuria

- Tajuria albiplaga de Niceville, 1887

Tajuria albiplaga albiplaga de Niceville, 1887
Tajuria albiplaga alixae Eliot, 1973

- Tajuria berenis larutensis Pendlebury, 1933
- Tajuria cippus (Fabricius, 1798)

Tajuria cippus cippus (Fabricius, 1798)
Tajuria cippus malcolmi Riley & Godfrey, 1925

- Tajuria deudorix ingeni Corbet, 1948
- Tajuria diaeus diaeus (Hewitson, [1865])
- Tajuria dominus H.H.Druce, 1895

Tajuria dominus dominus H.H.Druce, 1895
Tajuria dominus culta (de Niceville, [1896])

- Tajuria illurgis illurgis (Hewitson, [1869])
- Tajuria illurgioides de Niceville, 1890
- Tajuria isaeus (Hewitson, [1865])

Tajuria isaeus tyro de Niceville, 1895
Tajuria isaeus verna Corbet, 1940

- Tajuria ister (Hewitson, [1865])

Tajuria ister ister (Hewitson, [1865])
Tajuria ister tussis H.H.Druce, 1895

- Tajuria luculenta (Leech, 1890)

Tajuria luculenta luculenta (Leech, 1890)
Tajuria luculenta taorana Corbet, 1940

- Tajuria maculata (Hewitson, [1865])
- Tajuria mantra (Felder & Felder, 1860)

Tajuria mantra mantra (Felder & Felder, 1860)
Tajuria mantra ogyges (de Niceville, 1895)

- Tajuria megistia (Hewitson, [1869])

Tajuria megistia megistia (Hewitson, [1869])
Tajuria megistia thria de Niceville, [1896]

- Tajuria melastigma de Niceville, 1887
- Tajuria sekii Saito, 2005
- Tajuria shigehoi Seki & Saito, 2006
- Tajuria sunia Pendlebury, 1933
- Tajuria yajna ellisi Evans, 1925

tribe: Remelanini

genus: Pseudotajuria

- Pseudotajuria donatana donatana (de Niceville, [1889])

genus: Remelana

- Remelana jangala (Horsfield, [1829])

Remelana jangala travana (Hewitson, [1865])
Remelana jangala ravata (Moore, [1866])

genus: Ancema

- Ancema blanka (de Niceville, 1894)

Ancema blanka blanka (de Niceville, 1894)
Ancema blanka minturna (Fruhstorfer, [1912])

- Ancema ctesia ctesia (Hewitson, [1865])

tribe: Theclini

genus: Amblopala

- Amblopala avidiena y-fasciata (Sonan, 1929)

genus: Antigius

- Antigius attila obsoletus (Takeuchi, 1923)
- Antigius shizuyai Koiwaya, 2003

genus: Araragi

- Araragi enthea morisonensis (M. Inoue, 1942)

genus: Teratozephyrus

- Teratozephyrus kimurai kimurai Koiwaya, 2002
- Teratozephyrus nuwai Koiwaya, 1996

genus: Neozephyrus

- Neozephyrus uedai kachinus Koiwaya, 2002

genus: Chrysozephyrus

- Chrysozephyrus disparatus (Howarth, 1957)

Chrysozephyrus disparatus disparatus (Howarth, 1957)
Chrysozephyrus disparatus pseudoletha (Howarth, 1957)

- Chrysozephyrus duma (Hewitson, [1869])
- Chrysozephyrus dumoides (Tytler, 1915)
- Chrysozephyrus esakii raja Sugiyama, 1993
- Chrysozephyrus haradai Koiwaya, 2000
- Chrysozephyrus hatoyamai hatoyamai Fujioka, 2003
- Chrysozephyrus kabrua (Tytler, 1915)

Chrysozephyrus kabrua philipi Eliot, 1987
Chrysozephyrus kabrua ueharai Koiwaya & Osada, 1998

- Chrysozephyrus intermedius (Tytler, 1915)

Chrysozephyrus intermedius lao Koiwaya & Osada, 1998
Chrysozephyrus intermedius tamamitsui Morita, 2001

- Chrysozephyrus inthanonensis Kimura & Murayama, 1990

Chrysozephyrus inthanonensis inthanonensis Murayama & Kimura, 1990
Chrysozephyrus inthanonensis miyashitai Morita, 2003

- Chrysozephyrus nigroapicalis (Howarth, 1957)

Chrysozephyrus nigroapicalis khambounei Koiwaya & Osada, 1998
Chrysozephyrus nigroapicalis katsurai Morita, 2003

- Chrysozephyrus scintillans (Leech, 1893)
- Chrysozephyrus souleana myanmarensis Koiwaya, 2000
- Chrysozephyrus paona (Tytler, 1915)
- Chrysozephyrus tienmushanus Shirôzu & Yamamoto 1959
- Chrysozephyrus tytleri yodoei Fujioka, 2003
- Chrysozephyrus vietnamicus vietnamicus Koiwaya, 2003
- Chrysozephyrus vittatus (Tytler, 1915)

Chrysozephyrus vittatus phoopan Koiwaya, 2002
Chrysozephyrus vittatus akikoae Morita, 2002

- Chrysozephyrus wakaharai wakaharai Koiwaya, 2002
- Chrysozephyrus watsoni kameii Koiwaya, 2000

genus: Cordelia

- Cordelia comes wilemaniella (Matsumura, 1929)

genus: Euaspa

- Euaspa forsteri (Esaki & Shirozu, 1943)
- Euaspa milionia formosana Nomura, 1931
- Euaspa tayal (Esaki & Shirozu, 1943)

genus: Iratsume

- Iratsume orsedice suzukii (Sonan, 1940)

genus: Japonica

- Japonica patungkoanui Matsumura, 1956

genus: Leucantigius

- Leucantigius atayalicus (Shirozu & Murayama, 1943)

genus: Neozephyrus

- Neozephyrus taiwanus (Wileman, 1908)

genus: Ravenna

- Ravenna nivea (Nire, 1920)

genus: Sibataniozephyrus

- Sibataniozephyrus kuafui Hsu & Lin, 1994

genus: Teratozephyrus

- Teratozephyrus arisanus (Wileman, 1909)
- Teratozephyrus elatus Hsu & Lu, 2005
- Teratozephyrus yugaii (Kano, 1928)

genus: Ussuriana

- Ussuriana michaelis (Oberthur, 1880)

Ussuriana michaelis takarana (Araki & Hirayama, 1941)

genus: Wagimo

- Wagimo sulgeri insularis (Shirozu, 1957)

genus: Shirozuozephyrus

- Shirozuozephyrus kirbariensis (Tytler, 1915)

Shirozuozephyrus kirbariensis mapanputicus (Koiwaya, 2000)
Shirozuozephyrus kirbariensis machimurai (Koiwaya, 2002)

- Shirozuozephyrus masatoshii (Koiwaya, 2002)

genus: Inomataozephyrus

- Inomataozephyrus assamicus (Tytler, 1915)

genus: Kawazoeozephyrus

- Kawazoeozephyrus mushaellus (Matsumura, 1938)

Kawazoeozephyrus mushaellus sakaguchii (Koiwaya, 2002)

- Kawazoeozephyrus jiroi (Koiwaya, 2002)

genus: Thermozephyrus

- Thermozephyrus ataxus zulla (Tytler, 1915)

genus: Howarthia

- Howarthia hishikawai Koiwaya, 2000
- Howarthia kimurai Koiwaya, 2002

genus: Hayashikeia

- Hayashikeia ueharai (Koiwaya, 2002)

genus: Nanlingozephyrus

- Nanlingozephyrus bella (Hsu, 1997)

Nanlingozephyrus bella bella (Hsu, 1997)
Nanlingozephyrus bella lao (Koiwaya, 2002)

genus: Leucantigius

- Leucantigius atayalicus (Shirôzu & Murayama, 1943)

genus: Yamamotozephyrus

- Yamamotozephyrus kwangtungensis hainanus (Koiwaya, 1993)

genus: Euaspa

- Euaspa forsteri ueharai Koiwaya, 2002
- Euaspa milionia milionia Hewitson, [1869]
- Euaspa wuyishana chohtarohi Funahashi, 2003
- Euaspa hishikawai Koiwaya 2002

Euaspa hishikawai hishikawai Koiwaya, 2002
Euaspa hishikawai minaei Monastyrskii & Devyatkin, 2003

- Euaspa koizumii Koiwaya, 2002
- Euaspa nishimurai Koiwaya, 2002

genus: Proteuaspa

- Proteuaspa akikoae Koiwaya & Morita, 2003

== Family Nymphalidae ==
subfamily: Heliconiinae

genus: Acraea

- Acraea issoria (Hubner, [1819])

Acraea issoria vestalina (Fruhstorfer, 1906)
Acraea issoria sordice (Fruhstorfer, 1914)

- Acraea violae (Fabricius, 1775)

genus: Argynnis

- Argynnis hyperbius (Linnaeus, 1763)

Argynnis hyperbius hyperbius (Linnaeus, 1763)
Argynnis hyperbius lates Tsukada, 1985

- Argynnis laodice (Pallas, 1771)
- Argynnis childreni Gray, 1831

genus: Cupha

- Cupha erymanthis erymanthis (Drury, [1773])

Cupha erymanthis lotis (Sulzer, 1776)
Cupha erymanthis tiomana (Corbet, 1940

genus: Phalanta

- Phalanta phalantha phalantha (Drury, [1773])
- Phalanta alcippe alcippoides (Moore, [1900])

genus: Vagrans

- Vagrans sinha sinha (Kollar, [1844])

genus: Vindula

- Vindula erota erota (Fabricius, 1793)
- Vindula dejone erotella (Butler, [1879])

genus: Cirrochroa

- Cirrochroa tyche Felder & Felder, 1861

Cirrochroa tyche mithila Moore, 1872
Cirrochroa tyche rotundata Butler, [1879]
Cirrochroa tyche aurica Eliot, 1978

- Cirrochroa aoris olivacea de Niceville, 1886
- Cirrochroa surya siamensis Fruhstorfer, 1906
- Cirrochroa emalea emalea (Guerin-Meneville, [1843])
- Cirrochroa orissa orissa Felder & Felder, 1860
- Cirrochroa chione Riley & Godfrey, 1921
- Cirrochroa satellita satellita Butler, 1869
- Cirrochroa kishii Saito & Inayoshi, 2009
- Cirrochroa malaya malaya C. & R. Felder, 1860

genus: Paduca

- Paduca fasciata fasciata (Felder & Felder, 1860)

genus: Terinos

- Terinos atlita atlita (Fabricius, 1787)

Terinos atlita fulminans Butler, 1869
Terinos atlita teuthras Hewitson, 1862
Terinos atlita miletum Oberthur, 1897

- Terinos clarissa Boisduval, 1836

Terinos clarissa nympha Wallace, 1869
Terinos clarissa aurensis (Eliot, 1978
Terinos clarissa malayana Fruhstorfer, 1906
Terinos clarissa falcata Fruhstorfer, 1898

- Terinos terpander terpander Hewitson, 1862

Terinos terpander robertsia Butler, 1867
Terinos terpander blachieri Fruhstorfer, 1914
Terinos terpander intermedia Godfrey, 1916
Terinos terpander tiomanensis Eliot, 1978

genus: Cethosia

- Cethosia biblis (Drury, [1773])

Cethosia biblis biblis (Drury, [1773])
Cethosia biblis perakana Fruhstorfer, 1902
Cethosia biblis pemanggilensis Eliot, 1978

- Cethosia cyane euanthes Fruhstorfer, 1912
- Cethosia hypsea hypsina Felder & Felder, [1867]

Cethosia hypsea elioti Okubo, 1983

- Cethosia methypsea methypsea Butler, [1879]

subfamily: Morphinae

tribe: Amathusiini

genus: Aemona

- Aemona amathusia amathusia (Hewitson, 1868)
- Aemona implicata Monastyrskii & Devyatkin, 2003
- Aemona kontumei Monastyrskii & Devyatkin, 2003
- Aemona lena Atkinson, 1871
- Aemona simulatrix Monastyrskii & Devyatkin, 2003

genus: Amathusia

- Amathusia phidippus phidippus (Linnaeus, 1763)
- Amathusia friderici holmanhunti Corbet & Pendlebury, 1936
- Amathusia schoenbergi Honrath, [1888]
- Amathusia ochraceofusca Honrath, [1888]
- Amathusia masina malaya Corbet & Pendlebury, 1936

genus: Amathuxidia

- Amathuxidia amythaon (Doubleday, 1847)

Amathuxidia amythaon amythaon (Doubleday, 1847)
Amathuxidia amythaon dilucida (Honrath, 1884)
Amathuxidia amythaon annamensis Talbot, 1932

genus: Discophora

- Discophora aestheta Monastyrskii & Devyatkin, 2003
- Discophora deo de Niceville, 1898

Discophora deo deo de Niceville, 1898
Discophora deo fruhstorferi Stichel, 1901

- Discophora necho engamon Fruhstorfer, 1911
- Discophora sondaica Boisduval, 1836

Discophora sondaica zal Westwood, [1851]
Discophora sondaica despoliata Stichel, 1902
Discophora sondaica tulliana Stichel, 1905

- Discophora timora Westwood, [1850]

Discophora timora timora Westwood, [1850]
Discophora timora perakensis Stichel, 1900

genus: Enispe

- Enispe cycnus cycnus Westwood, [1851]
- Enispe duranius Fruhstorfer, 1911

Enispe duranius intermedia Rothschild, 1916
Enispe duranius corbeti Pendlebury, 1933

- Enispe euthymius (Doubleday, 1845)

Enispe euthymius euthymius (Doubleday, 1845)
Enispe eutymius sychaeus Brooks, 1949

genus: Faunis

- Faunis aerope excelsa (Fruhstorfer, 1901)
- Faunis arcesilaus (Fabricius, 1787)
- Faunis canens arcesilas Stichel, 1933
- Faunis eumeus incerta (Staudinger, [1887])
- Faunis gracilis (Butler, 1867)
- Faunis kirata (de Niceville, 1891)

genus: Melanocyma

- Melanocyma faunula (Westwood, 1850)

Melanocyma faunula faunula (Westwood, 1850)
Melanocyma faunula kimurai Saitoh, 2003

genus: Stichophthalma

- Stichophthalma camadeva camadevoides de Niceville, 1899
- Stichophthalma cambodia (Hewitson, [1862])
- Stichophthalma fruhstorferi Rober, 1903
- Stichophthalma godfreyi Rothschild, 1916
- Stichophthalma howqua (Westwood, 1851)

Stichophthalma howqua tonkiniana Fruhstorfer, 1901
Stichophthalma howqua iapetus Brooks, 1949

- Stichophthalma louisa (Wood-Mason, 1877)

Stichophthalma louisa louisa (Wood-Mason, 1877)
Stichophthalma louisa mathilda Janet, 1905
Stichophthalma louisa siamensis Rothschild, 1916
Stichophthalma louisa ranohngensis Okano, 1985
Stichophthalma louisa eamesi Monastyrskii, Devyatkin & Uémura, 2000

- Stichophthalma neumogeni regulus Brooks, 1949
- Stichophthalma uemurai Nishimura, 1998

Stichophthalma uemurai uemurai Nishimura, 1998
Stichophthalma uemurai gialaii Monastyrskii & Devyatkin, 2000

genus: Thaumantis

- Thaumantis diores Doubleday, 1845

Thaumantis diores diores Doubleday, 1845
Thaumantis diores splendens Tytler, 1939

- Thaumantis klugius lucipor Westwood, [1851]
- Thaumantis noureddin noureddin Westwood, [1851]
- Thaumantis odana pishuna Fruhstorfer, 1905

genus: Thauria

- Thauria aliris (Westwood, [1858])

Thauria aliris pseudaliris (Butler, [1877])
Thauria aliris intermedia Crowley, 1896

- Thauria lathyi Fruhstorfer, 1901

Thautia lathyi lathyi Fruhstorfer, 1901
Thauria lathyi siamensis Rothschild, 1916
Thauria lathyi gabrieli Brooks, 1937

genus: Zeuxidia

- Zeuxidia amethystus amethystus Butler, 1865
- Zeuxidia aurelius aurelius (Cramer, [1777])
- Zeuxidia doubledayi doubledayi Westwood, [1851]
- Zeuxidia masoni Moore, [1879]
- Zeuxidia sapphirus Monastyrskii & Devyatkin, 2003

subfamily: Limenitidinae

genus: Pantoporia

- Pantoporia aureia (Staudinger, 1886)

Pantoporia aurelia aurelia (Staudinger, 1886)
Pantoporia aurelia boma Eliot, 1969

- Pantoporia bieti (Oberthur, 1894)

Pantoporia bieti paona (Tytler, 1915)

- Pantoporia dindinga (Butler, [1879])
- Pantoporia hordonia hordonia (Stoll, [1790])
- Pantoporia paraka paraka (Butler, [1879])
- Pantoporia sandaka davidsoni Eliot, 1969

genus: Lasippa

- Lasippa heliodore heliodore (Fabricius, 1787)
- Lasippa monata monata (Weyenbergh, 1874)

Lasippa monata monata(Weyenbergh, 1874)
Lasippa monata khoai Saito & Inayoshi, 2014

- Lasippa tiga (Moore, 1858)

Lasippa tiga camboja (Moore, 1879)
Lasippa tiga siaka (Moore, 1881)

- Lasippa viraja viraja (Moore, 1872)

genus: Neptis

- Neptis ananta learmondi Tytler, 1940
- Neptis anjana decerna (Fruhstorfer, 1908)
- Neptis antilope antilope Leech, 1890
- Neptis armandia (Oberthur, 1876)

Neptis armandia pila Tytler, 1940
Neptis armandia manardia Eliot, 1969
Neptis armandia morrisi Monastyrskii & Devyatkin, 2003

- Neptis capnodes pandoces Eliot, 1969
- Neptis cartica Moore, 1872

Neptis cartica cartica Moore, 1872
Neptis cartica burmana de Niceville, 1886
Neptis cartica teshirogii Saito & Inayoshi, 2014

- Neptis clinia Moore, 1872

Neptis clinia susruta Moore, 1872
Neptis clinia leuconata Butler, [1879]

- Neptis dejeani cuongi Saito & Inayoshi, 2014
- Neptis cydippe Leech 1890
- Neptis duryodana nesia Fruhstorfer, 1908
- Neptis genulfa miennamica Monastyrskii & Devyatkin, 2003
- Neptis harita Moore, [1875]

Neptis harita harita Moore, [1875]
Neptis harita preeyai Kimura, 1993

- Neptis hylas (Linnaeus, 1758)

Neptis hylas kamarupa Moore, 1874
Neptis hylas papaja Moore, [1875]

- Neptis ilira cindia Eliot, 1969
- Neptis jumbah jumbah Moore, 1857
- Neptis leucoporos Fruhstorfer, 1908

Neptis leucoporos leucoporos Fruhstorfer, 1908
Neptis leucoporos cresina Fruhstorfer, 1908

- Neptis magadha Felder & Felder, [1867]

Neptis magadha magadha Felder & Felder, [1867]
Neptis magadha charon Butler, 1875
Neptis magadha annamitica Fruhstorfer, 1908

- Neptis manasa Moore, 1857

Neptis manasa manasa Moore, 1857
Neptis manasa narcissina Oberthur, 1906
Neptis manasa mientrunga Monastyrskii, 2012

- Neptis miah Moore, 1857

Neptis miah nolana H.Druce, 1874
Neptis miah batara Moore, 1881
Neptis miah disopa Swinhoe, 1893
Neptis miah thaithummakulorum Saito & Inayoshi, 2014

- Neptis namba namba Tytler, 1915
- Neptis narayana dubernardi Eliot, 1969
- Neptis nashona Swinhoe, 1896

Neptis nashona aagaardi Riley, 1932
Neptis nashona chapa Eliot, 1969
Neptis nashona tamamitsui Saito & Inayoshi, 2014
Neptis nashona kishii Saito & Inayoshi, 2014

- Neptis nata Moore, 1857

Neptis nata adipala Moore, 1872
Neptis nata gononata Butler, 1879

- Neptis nemorum nemorum Oberhur, 1906
- Neptis omeroda omeroda Moore, [1875]
- Neptis philyra melior Hall, 1930
- Neptis philyroides mienbaca Monastyrskii & Devyatkin, 2003
- Neptis pseudovikasi (Moore, 1899)
- Neptis radha radha Moore, [1858]
- Neptis sankara (Kollar, [1844])

Neptis sankara guiltoides Tytler, 1940
Neptis sankara sugimotoi Saito & Inayoshi, 2014

- Neptis sappho astola Moore, 1872
- Neptis sedata Sasaki, 1982
- Neptis soma shania Evans, 1924
- Neptis themis theodora Oberhur, 1906
- Neptis transita Monastyrskii, 2005
- Neptis zaida Westwood, 1850

Neptis zaida putoia Evans, 1932
Neptis zaida hasegawai Saito & Inayoshi, 2014
Neptis zaida inayoshii Saito, 2014
Neptis zaida prasobchoki Saito & Inayoshi, 2014

genus: Phaedyma

- Phaedyma armariola Monastyrskii, 2005
- Phaedyma aspasia aspasia (Leech, 1890)
- Phaedyma columella (Cramer, [1780])

Phaedyma columella columella (Cramer, [1780])
Phaedyma columella martabana (Moore, 1881)

genus: Athyma

- Athyma abiasa clerica Butler, 1879
- Athyma asura Moore, [1858]

Athyma asura asura Moore, [1858]
Athyma asura idita Moore, 1858

- Athyma cama ambra Staudinger, 1892

Athyma cama camasa (Fruhstorfer, 1906)

- Athyma clerica clerica Butler, [1879]
- Athyma jina jina Moore, [1858]
- Athyma kanwa Moore, 1858

Athyma kanwa kanwa Moore, 1858
Athyma kanwa phorkys (Fruhstorfer, 1912)

- Athyma larymna (Doubleday, [1848])

Athyma larymna selessana Fruhstorfer, 1906
Athyma larymna siamensis Fruhstorfer, 1906

- Athyma matanga malaya (Pendlebury, 1933)
- Athyma nefte (Cramer, [1780])

Athyma nefte asita Moore, 1858
Athyma nefte subrata Moore, 1858

- Athyma opalina (Kollar, [1844])

Athyma opalina shan (Tytler, 1940)
Athyma opalina parajina Fruhstorfer, 1902

- Athyma orientalis (Elwes, 1888)
- Athyma perius perius (Linnaeus, 1758)
- Athyma pravara Moore, 1857

Athyma pravara indosinica Fruhstorfer, 1906
Athyma pravara helma Fruhstorfer, 1906

- Athyma punctata Leech, 1890

Athyma punctata punctata Leech, 1890
Athyma punctata prasobsuki Katayama, 1989

- Athyma ranga Moore, [1858]

Athyma ranga ranga Moore, [1858]
Athyma ranga obsolescens (Fruhstorfer, 1906)

- Athyma reta reta Moore, 1858
- Athyma selenophora (Kollar, [1844])

Athyma selenophora amhara Druce, 1873
Athyma selenophora amharina (Moore, [1898])
Athyma selenophora bahula Moore, 1858
Athyma selenophora batilda Fruhstorfer, 1908

- Athyma sulpitia sulpitia (Cramer, [1779])

Athyma sulpitia adamsoni (Moore, 1898)

- Athyma zeroca Moore, 1872
- Athyma whitei (Tytler, 1940)

Athyma zeroca galaesus (Fruhstorfer, 1912)
Athyma zeroca meinippus (Fruhstorfer, 1912)

genus: Limenitis

- Limenitis sulpitia sulpitia (Cramer, [1779])
- Limenitis mimica Poujade, 1885

Limenitis mimica ueharai (Tateishi, 1999)
Limenitis mimica ngoclinensis Monastyrskii, Devyatkin & Hong, 2000

genus: Parthenos

- Parthenos sylla (Donovan, 1798)

Parthenos sylla apicalis Moore, [1879]
Parthenos sylla lilacinus Butler, [1879]

genus: Lebadea

- Lebadea martha (Fabricius, 1787)

Lebadea martha martha (Fabricius, 1787)
Lebadea martha malayana Fruhstorfer, [1902]

genus: Sumalia

- Sumalia daraxa daraxa (Doubleday, [1848])
- Sumalia zulema (Doubleday & Hewitson, 1848)

genus: Parasarpa

- Parasarpa dudu dudu (Doubleday, 1848)
- Parasarpa zayla kawasakii Funahashi, 2003
- Parasarpa houlberti Oberthur, 1913

genus: Bhagadatta

- Bhagadatta austenia (Moore, 1872)

Bhagadatta austenia austenia (Moore, 1872)
Bhagadatta austenia violetta Miyata & Yoshida, 1995

genus: Auzakia

- Auzakia danava danava (Moore, [1858])

genus: Pandita

- Pandita sinope sinope Moore, [1858]

genus: Moduza

- Moduza procris (Cramer, [1777])

Moduza procris procris (Cramer, [1777])
Moduza procris milonia (Fruhstorfer, 1906)

genus: Abrota

- Abrota ganga flavina Mell, 1923

genus: Neurosigma

- Neurosigma siva nonius de Niceville, 1896

genus: Tanaecia

- Tanaecia aruna aruna (Felder & Felder, 1860)
- Tanaecia clathrata violaria Butler, 1869
- Tanaecia jahnu (Moore, [1858])
- Tanaecia julii (Lesson, 1837)

Tanaecia julii odilina (Fruhstorfer, 1913)
Tanaecia julii xiphiones (Butler, [1869])
Tanaecia julii mansori Yokochi, 1993

- Tanaecia munda waterstradti Corbet, 1941
- Tanaecia palguna consanguinea Distant, 1886
- Tanaecia pelea pelea (Fabricius, 1787)

genus: Cynitia

- Cynitia cocytina puseda (Moore, [1858])
- Cynitia cocytus (Fabricius, 1787)

Cynitia cocytus cocytus (Fabricius, 1787)
Cynitia cocytus ambrysus (Fruhstorfer, 1913)

- Cynitia flora andersonii (Moore, 1884)
- Cynitia godartii asoka (Felder & Felder, [1867])
- Cynitia lepidea (Butler, 1868)

Cynitia lepidea sthavara (Fruhstorfer, 1913)
Cynitia lepidea cognata (Moore, [1897])
Cynitia lepidea flaminia (Fruhstorfer, 1905)

- Cynitia shigehoi Saito & Saito, 2010
- Cynitia stellata Saito, 2004
- Cynitia telchinia telchinia (Menetries, 1857)
- Cynitia whiteheadi (Crowley, 1900)

Cynitia whiteheadi whiteheadi (Crowley, 1900)

genus: Euthalia

- Euthalia aconthea (Cramer, 1777)

Euthalia aconthea garuda (Moore, [1858])
Euthalia aconthea gurda Fruhstorfer, 1906

- Euthalia adonia beata Fruhstorfer, 1905
- Euthalia agnis hiyamai Yokochi & Matsuda, 1999
- Euthalia alboapicala Monastyrskii, 2005
- Euthalia alpheda Godart, 1824

Euthalia alpheda verena Fruhstorfer, 1912
Euthalia alpheda yamuna Fruhstorfer, 1906

- Euthalia anosia (Moore, 1857)

Euthalia anosia anosia (Moore, [1858])
Euthalia anosia bunaya Fruhstorfer, 1913

- Euthalia bunzoi bunzoi Sugiyama, 1996
- Euthalia byakko Uehara & Yoshida, 1995
- Euthalia confucius gibbsi Monastyrskii & Devyatkin, 2003
- Euthalia djata Distant & Pryer, 1887

Euthalia djata siamica Riley & Godfrey, 1925
Euthalia djata osadai Yokochi, 1999

- Euthalia duda bellula Yokochi, 2005
- Euthalia dunya dunya (Doubleday, [1848])
- Euthalia eriphylae de Niceville, 1891

Euthalia eriphylae eriphylae de Niceville, 1891
Euthalia eriphylae chula Fruhstorfer, 1905
Euthalia eriphylae lioneli Fruhstorfer, 1905
Euthalia eriphylae raya Eliot, 1960

- Euthalia evelina (Stoll, 1790)

Euthalia evelina annamita (Moore, 1879)
Euthalia evelina compta (Fruhstorfer, 1899)
Euthalia evelina vallona (Fruhstorfer, 1913)

- Euthalia franciae raja (Felder & Felder, 1859)
- Euthalia hebe tsuchiyai Yokochi, 2005
- Euthalia hoa Monastyrskii, 2005
- Euthalia ipona Fruhstorfer, 1913
- Euthalia iva buensis Monastyrskii, Nguyen & Yokochi, 2000
- Euthalia kanda (Moore, 1859)

Euthalia kanda elicius de Niceville, 1890
Euthalia kanda marana Corbet, 1937

- Euthalia khambournei khambournei Uehara & Yokochi, 2001
- Euthalia lubentina (Cramer, [1777])

Euthalia lubentina lubentina (Cramer, [1777])
Euthalia lubentina chersonesia Fruhstorfer, 1904

- Euthalia mahadeva (Moore, 1859)

Euthalia mahadeva binghamii de Niceville, 1895
Euthalia mahadeva zichrina Fruhstorfer, 1904

- Euthalia malaccana malaccana Fruhstofer, 1899
- Euthalia merta (Moore, 1859)

Euthalia merta merta (Moore, 1859)
Euthalia merta milleri Pendlebury, 1939

- Euthalia monina (Fabricius, 1787)

Euthalia monina monina (Fabricius, 1787)
Euthalia monina kesava (Moore, 1859)

- Euthalia nara (Moore, 1859)

Euthalia nara shania Evans, 1924
Euthalia nara kalawrica Tytler, 1940

- Euthalia omeia Leech, 1891
- Euthalia pacifica masaokai Yokochi, 2005
- Euthalia patala taooana (Moore, [1879])
- Euthalia phemius phemius (Doubleday, [1848])
- Euthalia pratti occidentalis Hall, 1930
- Euthalia pyrhha ueharai Yokochi, 2005
- Euthalia recta monilis (Moore, [1897])
- Euthalia sahadeva narayana Grose-Smith & Kirby, 1891
- Euthalia saitaphernes Fruhstorfer, 1913

Euthalia saitaphernes saitaphernes Fruhstorfer, 1913
Euthalia saitaphernes tamamitsui Saito & Inayoshi, 2009

- Euthalia shinkaii Yokochi, 2004
- Euthalia strephon haradai Yokochi, 1996
- Euthalia strephonida Monastyrskii, 2005
- Euthalia suprema Uehara & Yokochi, 2001
- Euthalia teuta (Doubleday, 1848)

Euthalia teuta teuta (Doubleday, 1848)
Euthalia teuta gupta (de Niceville, 1886)
Euthalia teuta goodrichi Distant, 1886
Euthalia teuta rayana Morishita, 1968

- Euthalia tinna paupera Fruhstorfer, 1906
- Euthalia whiteheadi Grose-Smith, 1889

Euthalia whiteheadi whiteheadi Grose-Smith, 1889
Euthalia whiteheadi miyazakii Saito & Saito, 2003

genus: Lexias

- Lexias albopunctata (Crowley, 1895)

Lexias albopunctata albopunctata (Crowley, 1895)
Lexias albopunctata borealis Hanafusa, 1990
Lexias albopunctata exarchus Fruhstorfer, 1914

- Lexias bangkana johorensis Tsukada, 1991
- Lexias canescens pardalina (Staudinger, 1886)
- Lexias cyanipardus grandis Yokochi, 1991
- Lexias dirtea (Fabricius, 1793)

Lexias dirtea agosthena (Fruhstorfer, 1914)
Lexias dirtea merguia (Tytler, 1926)
Lexias dirtea bontouxi (Vitalis de Salvaza, 1924)

- Lexias pardalis (Moore, 1878)

Lexias pardalis eleanor (Fruhstorfer, 1898)
Lexias pardalis jadeitina (Fruhstorfer, 1913)
Lexias pardalis dirteana (Corbet, 1941)

subfamily: Apaturinae

genus: Chitoria

- Chitoria cooperi (Tytler, 1926)
- Chitoria naga (Tytler, 1914)
- Chitoria sordida sordida (Moore, 1865)

Chitoria sordida vietnamica Nguyen, 1979

- Chitoria ulupi ulupi (Doherty, 1889)

Chitoria ulupi kalaurica Tytler, 1926

genus: Dilipa

- Dilipa morgiana (Westwood, [1850])

genus: Eulaceura

- Eulaceura osteria (Westwood, [1850])

Eulaceura osteria sitarama Fruhstorfer, 1913
Eulaceura osteria kumana Fruhstorfer, 1913

- Eulaceura manipuriensis Tytler, 1915

genus: Euripus

- Euripus consimilis consimilis (Westwood, 1850)

Euripus consimilis eurinus Fruhstorfer, 1903
Euripus consimilis yunnanensis Chou, Yuan, Yin, Zhang & Chen, 2002

- Euripus nyctelius nyctelius (Doubleday, 1845)

Euripus nyctelius mastor Fruhstorfer, 1903
Euripus nyctelius euploeoides C. & R. Felder, [1867]

genus: Helcyra

- Helcyra hemina hemina Hewitson, 1864
- Helcyra miyamotoi Koiwaya, 2003
- Helcyra subalba (Poujade, 1885)
- Helcyra superba superba Leech, 1890
- Herona marathus Doubleday, [1848]

genus: Herona

Herona marathus marathus Doubleday, [1848]
Herona marathus angustata Moore, [1879]
Herona marathus marathon Fruhstorfer, 1906
Herona marathus stellaris Tsukada, 1991

- Herona sumatrana dusuntua Corbet, 1937

genus: Hestina

- Hestina assimilis assimilis (Linnaeus, 1758)
- Hestina mena Moore, 1858
- Hestina mimetica Butler, 1874
- Hestina nama (Doubleday, 1845)

Hestina nama nama (Doubleday, 1845)

- Hestina nicevillei magna Omoto & Funahashi, 2004
- Hestina persimilis persimilis (Westwood, [1850])

genus: Rohana

- Rohana nakula (Moore, [1858])

Rohana nakula bernardii Nguyen-Phung, 1985
Rohana nakula thantoana Kimura, 1994

- Rohana parisatis (Westwood, [1850])

Rohana parisatis staurakius (Fruhstorfer, 1913)
Rohana parisatis pseudosiamensis Nguyen-Phung, 1985

- Rohana parvata burmana (Tytler, 1940)
- Rohana tonkiniana Fruhstorfer, 1906

Rohana tonkiniana tonkiniana Fruhstorfer, 1906
Rohana tonkiniana siamensis (Fruhstorfer, 1913)

genus: Mimathyma

- Mimathyma ambica (Kollar, [1844])

Mimathyma ambica miranda (Fruhstorfer, 1902)
Mimathyma ambica claribella (Fruhstorfer, 1902)

- Mimathyma chevana chevana (Moore, [1866])

genus: Sasakia

- Sasakia charonda yunnanensis Fruhstorfer, 1913
- Sasakia funeblis funeblis (Leech, 1891)

genus: Sephisa

- Sephisa chandra (Moore, [1858])

Sephisa chandra chandra (Moore, [1858])
Sephisa chandra stubbsi Corbet, 1941

subfamily: Cyrestinae

genus: Chersonesia

- Chersonesia intermedia Martin, 1895

Chersonesia intermedia intermedia Martin, 1895
Chersonesia intermedia rahrioides Moore, [1899]

- Chersonesia nicevillei Martin, 1895
- Chersonesia peraka peraka Distant, 1884
- Chersonesia rahria rahria (Moore, [1858])
- Chersonesia risa risa (Doubleday, [1848])

genus: Cyrestis

- Cyrestis cocles (Fabricius, 1787)

Cyrestis cocles cocles (Fabricius, 1787)
Cyrestis cocles earli Distant, 1883

- Cyrestis maenalis martini Hartert, 1902
- Cyrestis nivea (Zinken, 1831)

Cyrestis nivea nivalis Felder & Felder, [1867]
Cyrestis nivea tonkiniana Fruhstorfer, 1901

- Cyrestis themire Honrath, 1884

Cyrestis themire themire Honrath, 1884
Cyrestis themire vatinia Fruhstorfer, 1901

- Cyrestis thyodamas thyodamas Doyere, [1840]

genus: Dichorragia

- Dichorragia nesimachus (Doyere, [1840])

Dichorragia nesimachus nesimachus (Doyere, [1840])
Dichorragia nesimachus machates Fruhstorfer, 1903

genus: Pseudergolis

- Pseudergolis wedah wedah (Kollar, [1844])

genus: Stibochiona

- Stibochiona nicea (Gray, 1846)

Stibochiona nicea nicea (Gray, 1846)
Stibochiona nicea subucula Fruhstorfer, [1898]

subfamily: Biblidinae

genus: Ariadne

- Ariadne ariadne pallidior (Fruhstorfer, 1899)
- Ariadne specularia arca (Fruhstorfer, 1906)
- Ariadne merione (Cramer, [1777])

Ariadne merione tapestrina (Moore, 1884)
Ariadne merione ginosa (Fruhstorfer, 1912)

- Ariadne isaeus isaeus (Wallace, 1869)

genus: Laringa

- Laringa castelnaui castelnaui (Felder & Felder, 1860)
- Laringa horsfieldii glaucescens (de Niceville, 1895)

subfamily: Calinaginae

genus: Calinaga

- Calinaga aborica Tytler, 1915
- Calinaga buddha avalokita Fruhstorfer, 1914
- Calinaga funeralis Monastyrskii & Devyatkin, 2000
- Calinaga lhatso Oberthür, 1893
- Calinaga sudassana Melville, 1893

Calinaga sudassana sudassana Melville, 1893
Calinaga sudassana distans Monastyrskii & Devyatkin, 2000

subfamily: Charaxinae

genus: Agatasa

- Agatasa calydonia (Hewitson, [1854])

Agatasa calydonia calydonia (Hewitson, [1854])
Agatasa calydonia belisama (Crowley, 1891)

genus: Charaxes

- Charaxes aristogiton (Felder & Felder, [1867])

Charaxes aristogiton aristogiton Felder & Felder, [1867]
Charaxes aristogiton peridoneus Fruhstorfer, 1914

- Charaxes bernardus (Fabricius, 1793)

Charaxes bernardus agna Moore, 1878
Charaxes bernardus hierax Felder & Felder, [1867]
Charaxes bernardus crepax Fruhstorfer, 1914
Charaxes bernardus mahawedi Fruhstorfer, 1914

- Charaxes borneensis praestantius Fruhstorfer, 1914
- Charaxes durnfordi distanti Distant, 1884

Charaxes durnfordi merguia Tytler, 1926
Charaxes durnfordi nicholi (Grose-Smith, 1886)

- Charaxes distanti distanti Honrath, 1885
- Charaxes harmodius Felder & Felder, [1867]

Charaxes harmodius maruyamai Hanafusa, 1987
Charaxes harmodius martinus Rothschild, 1900
Charaxes harmodius shiloi Hanafusa, 1994

- Charaxes kahruba (Moore, [1895])
- Charaxes marmax Westwood, [1847]

Charaxes marmax marmax Westwood, [1847]
Charaxes marmax philopator Fruhstorfer, 1914
Charaxes marmax philosarcus Fruhstorfer, 1914

- Charaxes solon sulphureus Rothschild, 1900

Charaxes solon cunctator Fruhstorfer, 1914
Charaxes solon echo Butler, 1867

genus: Polyura

- Polyura athamas athamas (Drury, [1773])

Polyura athamas agrarius (Swinhoe, 1887)
Polyura athamas uraeus (Rothschild, 1899)

- Polyura arja arja (Felder & Felder, [1867])
- Polyura delphis (Doubleday, 1843)

Polyura delphis delphis (Doubleday, 1843)
Polyura delphis concha (Vollenhoeven, 1861)

- Polyura dolon grandis (Rothschiled & Jordan, 1898)
- Polyura eudamippus (Doubleday, 1843)

Polyura eudamippus nigrobasalis (Lathy, 1898)
Polyura eudamippus peninsularis (Pendlebury, 1933)
Polyura eudamippus jamblichus (Fruhstorfer, 1914)
Polyura eudamippus splendens (Tytler, 1940)

- Polyura hebe chersonesus (Fruhstorfer, 1898)

Polyura hebe plautus (Fruhstorfer, 1898)
Polyura hebe takizawai Hanafusa, 1987

- Polyura jalysus jalysus (Felder & Felder, [1867])
- Polyura moori Distant, 1883

Polyura moori moori (Distant, 1883)
Polyura moori sandakana (Fruhstorfer, 1895)

- Polyura narcaeus thawgawa Tytler, 1940
- Polyura nepenthes nepenthes (Grose-Smith, 1883)
- Polyura schreiber (Godart, [1824])

Polyura schreiber assamensis (Rothschild & Jordan, 1898)
Polyura schreiber tisamenus (Fruhstorfer, 1914)

genus: Prothoe

- Prothoe franck (Godart, [1824])

Prothoe franck uniformis Butler, 1885
Prothoe franck angelica Butler, 1885
Prothoe franck vilma Fruhstorfer, [1902]
Prothoe franck nausikaa Fruhstorfer, 1901

subfamily: Danainae

tribe: Danaini

genus: Danaus

- Danaus affinis malayanus Fruhstorfer 1899
- Danaus chrysippus chrysippus(Linnaeus, 1758) – plain tiger
- Danaus genutia genutia (Cramer, 1779) – common tiger
- Danaus melanippus hegesippus (Cramer, [1777])

genus: Idea

- Idea agamarschana hadeni (Wood-Mason & de Niceville, 1880)
- Idea hypermnestra linteata (Butler, [1879])
- Idea leuconoe Erichson, 1834

Idea leuconoe chersonesia (Fruhstorfer, 1898)
Idea leuconoe siamensis (Godfrey, 1916)

- Idea stolli logani (Moore, 1883)
- Idea lynceus lynceus (Drury, 1773)

genus: Ideopsis

- Ideopsis gaura perakana (Fruhstorfer, [1899]

Ideopsis gaura kajangensis Okubo, 1983

- Ideopsis juventa sitah (Fruhstorfer, 1904)
- Ideopsis similis persimilis (Moore, 1879) (Linnaeus, 1758) – Ceylon blue glassy tiger
- Ideopsis vulgaris (Butler, 1874)

Ideopsis vulgaris macrina (Fruhstorfer, 1904)
Ideopsis vulgaris contigua Talbot, 1939

genus: Parantica

- Parantica agleoides agleoides (Felder & Felder, 1860)
- Parantica aglea melanoides Moore, 1883 – glassy tiger
- Parantica aspasia aspasia (Fabricius, 1787)
- Parantica luzonensis aurensis Eliot, 1978
- Parantica melaneus (Cramer, [1775])
- Parantica melaneus sinopion (Fruhstorfer, 1910)
- Parantica sita (Kollar, [1844]) – chestnut tiger

Parantica sita sita (Kollar, [1844])
Parantica sita ethologa (Swinhoe, 1899)
Parantica sita melanosticta Morishita, 1994

- Parantica swinhoei (Moore, 1883) – Swinhoe's chocolate tiger

Parantica swinhoe szechuana (Fruhstorfer, 1899)

genus: Tirumala

- Tirumala gautama gautama (Moore, 1877)
- Tirumala limniace (Cramer, 1775) – blue tiger

Tirumala limniace limniace (Cramer, 1775)
Tirumala limniace exotica (Gmelin, 1790)

- Tirumala septentrionis septentrionis (Butler, 1874) – dark blue tiger

tribe: Euploeini

genus: Euploea

- Euploea alcathoe (Godart, 1819)
- Euploea algea menetriesii C. & R. Felder, 1860

Euploea algea deione Westwood, 1848
Euploea algea limborgii Moore, [1879]

- Euploea camaralzeman Butler, 1866

Euploea camaralzeman camaralzeman Butler, 1866
Euploea camaralzeman malayica (Butler, 1878)
Euploea camaralzeman paraclaudina Pendlebury, 1939

- Euploea conbuom (Saito & Inayoshi, 2006
- Euploea core godartii Lucas, 1853 – common Indian crow

Euploea core graminifera (Moore, 1883)
Euploea core vermiculata Butler, 1866

- Euploea crameri bremeri C. & R. Felder, 1860

Euploea crameri crameri Lucas, 1853
Euploea crameri praedicabilis Fruhstorfer, 1914

- Euploea doubledayi C. & R. Felder, [1865]

Euploea doubledayi evalida (Swinhoe, 1899)

- Euploea eyndhovii gardineri (Fruhstorfer, 1898)
- Euploea eunice (Godart, 1819)

Euploea eunice leucogonis (Butler, [1879])
Euploea eunice coelestis (Fruhstorfer, [1902])

- Euploea klugii klugii Moore, 1858
- Euploea klugii erichsonii Felder & Felder, [1865]
- Euploea midamus chloe (Guerin-Meneville, 1843)

Euploea midamus singapura (Moore, 1883)

- Euploea modesta modesta Butler, 1866

Euploea modesta tiomana Corbet, 1937

- Euploea mulciber mulciber Fruhstorfer, 1904 – striped blue crow
- Euploea phaenareta (Schaller, 1785)

Euploea phaenareta castelnaui Felder & Felder, [1865]
Euploea phaenareta drucei Moore, 1883

- Euploea radamanthus radamanthus (Fabricius, 1793)
- Euploea sylvester harrisii Felder & Felder, [1865]

Euploea sylvester tyrianthina (Moore, 1883)

- Euploea tulliolus (Fabricius, 1793)

Euploea tulliolus ledereri Felder & Felder, 1860
Euploea tulliolus dehaani Lucas, 1853
Euploea tulliolus aristotelis (Moore, 1883)

subfamily: Satyrinae

genus: Melanitis

- Melanitis leda leda (Linnaeus, 1758)
- Melanitis phedima (Cramer, [1780])

Melanitis phedima abdullae Distant, 1883
Melanitis phedima ganapati Fruhstorfer, 1908

- Melanitis zitenius auletes Fruhstorfer, 1908

genus: Cyllogenes

- Cyllogenes janetae orientalis Monastyrskii, 2005
- Cyllogenes milleri Monastyrskii, 2005

genus: Elymnias

- Elymnias casiphone saueri Distant, 1882
- Elymnias dara Distnat & Pryer, 1887

Elymnias dara daedalion (de Niceville, 1890)
Elymnias dara darina Fruhstorfer, 1907

- Elymnias esaca (Westwood, [1851])

Elymnias esaca esaca (Westwood, [1851])
Elymnias esaca andersonii (Moore, 1886)

- Elymnias harterti harterti Honrath, 1889
- Elymnias hypermnestra (Linnaeus, 1763)

Elymnias hypermnestra tinctoria Moore, [1879]
Elymnias hypermnestra agina Fruhstorfer, [1902]
Elymnias hypermnestra tonkiniana Fruhstorfer, [1902]
Elymnias hypermnestra meridionalis Fruhstorfer, 1902
Elymnias hypermnestra robinsona Monastyrskii & Devyatkin, 2003

- Elymnias malelas malelas (Hewitson, [1863])
- Elymnias miyagawai Saito & Kishi, 2012
- Elymnias nesaea (Linnaeus, 1764)

Elymnias nesaea timandra Wallace, 1869
Elymnias nesaea apelles Fruhstorfer, 1902
Elymnias nesaea lioneli Fruhstorfer, 1907

- Elymnias obnubila Marshall & de Niceville, 1883
- Elymnias panthera panthera (Fabricius, 1787)
- Elymnias patna (Westwood, [1851])

Elymnias patna stictica Fruhstorfer, [1902]

- Elymnias penanga (Westwood, [1851])

Elymnias penanga penanga (Westwood, [1851])
Elymnias penanga chelensis de Niceville, 1890

- Elymnias saola Monastyrskii, 2004
- Elymnias vasudeva Moore, [1858]

genus: Lethe

- Lethe berdievi Monastyrskii, 2005
- Lethe bhairava (Moore, [1858])
- Lethe camilla Leech, 1891
- Lethe chandica (Moore, 1858)

Lethe chandica chandica (Moore, [1858])
Lethe chandica suvarna Fruhstorfer, 1908

- Lethe confusa confusa Aurivillius, [1898]
- Lethe distans Butler, 1870
- Lethe dura (Marshall, 1882)

Lethe dura dura (Marshall, 1882)
Lethe dura mansonia Fruhstorfer, 1911

- Lethe europa (Fabricius, 1775)

Lethe europa niladana Fruhstorfer, 1911
Lethe europa malaya Corbet, 1941

- Lethe gemina yao Sugiyama, 1996
- Lethe goalpara goalpara (Moore, 1865)
- Lethe gulnihal peguana (Moore, [1892])
- Lethe hecate zao Yoshino, 2008
- Lethe huongii Monastyrskii, 2004
- Lethe kansa kansa (Moore, 1857)
- Lethe konkakini Monastyrskii & Devyatkin, 2000
- Lethe kondoi Uémura, 1997
- Lethe insana insana (Kollar, [1844])
- Lethe lanaris exista Yoshino, 2008
- Lethe latiaris perimele Fruhstorfer, 1911
- Lethe mekara (Moore, [1858])

Lethe mekara crijnana Fruhstorfer, 1911
Lethe mekara gopaka Fruhstorfer, 1911

- Lethe melisana Monastyrskii, 2005
- Lethe minerva tritogeneia Fruhstorfer, 1911
- Lethe naga Doherty, 1889
- Lethe nicetas nicetas (Hewitson, [1863])
- Lethe ocellata mon Yoshino, 2008
- Lethe philemon Fruhstorfer, [1902]
- Lethe philesana Monastyrskii & Devyatkin, 2000
- Lethe philesanoides Monastyrskii & Devyatkin, 2003
- Lethe rohria rohria (Fabricius, 1787)
- Lethe scanda (Moore, 1857)
- Lethe serbonis (Hewitson, 1876)
- Lethe siderea siderea Marshall, [1880]
- Lethe sidonis sidonis (Hewitson, [1863])
- Lethe sinorix sinorix (Hewitson, [1863])
- Lethe sura (Doubleday, 1849)
- Lethe syrcis diunaga (Fruhstorfer, 1911)
- Lethe umedai Koiwaya, 1998
- Lethe verma stenopa Fruhstorfer, 1908
- Lethe vindhya vindhya (Felder & Felder, 1859)
- Lethe violaceopicta (Poujade, 1884)

genus: Neope

- Neope armandii armandii (Oberthur, 1876)

- Neope bhadra (Moore, [1858])

- Neope muirheadi (Felder & Felder, 1862)

Neope muirheadi bhima Marshall, [1881]
Neope muirheadi lahittei (Janet, 1894)

- Neope pulaha pulahoides (Moore, [1892])
- Neope oberthueri Leech, 1891
- Neope yama (Moore, [1858])

Neope yama yama (Moore, [1858])
Neope yama kinpingensis Lee, 1962

genus: Orinoma

- Orinoma damaris damaris Gray, 1846

genus: Mandarinia

- Mandarinia regalis baronesa Fruhstorfer, 1906

genus: Callarge

- Callarge occidentalis fansipana Monastyrskii, 2005

genus: Neorina

- Neorina crishna archaica Fruhstorfer, 1911
- Neorina lowii neophyta Fruhstorfer, 1911
- Neorina neosinica Lee, 1985
- Neorina patria westwoodii Moore, [1891]

genus: Ethope

- Ethope himachala (Moore, 1857)
- Ethope diademoides (Moore, [1879])

Ethope diademoides attapeuensis Nakamura & Wakahara, 2008
Ethope diademoides diademoides (Moore, [1879])
Ethope diademoides hislopi Corbet, 1948
Ethope diademoides metayei Monastyrskii & Devyatkin, 2003

- Ethope noirei (Janet, 1896)

genus: Xanthotaenia

- Xanthotaenia busiris busiris (Westwood, [1858])

genus: Penthema

- Penthema lisarda michallati Janet, 1894 )
- Penthema darlisa Moore, 1879 )

Penthema darlisa mimetica Lathy, 1900
Penthema darlisa melema Riley & Godfrey, 1921
Penthema darlisa merguia Evans, 1924)

genus: Orsotriaena

- Orsotriaena medus medus (Fabricius, 1775)

genus: Mycalesis

- Mycalesis adamsonii Watson, 1897
- Mycalesis anapita anapita Moore, [1858]
- Mycalesis anaxias aemate Fruhstorfer, 1911
- Mycalesis anaxioides Marshall, 1883
- Mycalesis annamitica Fruhstorfer, 1906

Mycalesis annamitica annamitica Fruhstorfer, 1906
Mycalesis annamitica mausonia Fruhstorfer, 1906

- Mycalesis deficiens Fruhstorfer, 1906
- Mycalesis distanti Moore, [1892]
- Mycalesis fusca fusca (Felder & Felder, 1860)
- Mycalesis francisca (Cramer, 1782)

Mycalesis francisca ulia Fruhstorfer, 1908
Mycalesis francisca sanatanaMoore, [1858]

- Mycalesis gotama charaka Moore, [1875]
- Mycalesis inayoshii Aoki & Yamaguchi, 1995
- Mycalesis inopia Fruhstorfer, 1908
- Mycalesis intermedia (Moore, [1892])
- Mycalesis janardana sagittigera Fruhstorfer, 1908
- Mycalesis lepcha kohimensis Tytler, 1914
- Mycalesis maianeas maianeas Hewitson, [1864]
- Mycalesis malsara Moore, [1858]
- Mycalesis mineus (Linnaeus, 1758)

Mycalesis mineus mineus (Linnaeus, 1758)
Mycalesis mineus macromalayanaFruhstorfer, 1911

- Mycalesis misenus de Niceville, 1889
- Mycalesis mnasicles perna Fruhstorfer, 1906
- Mycalesis mucianus mucianus Fruhstorfer, 1908
- Mycalesis nicotia Westwood, [1850]
- Mycalesis oroatis Hewitson, [1864]

Mycalesis oroatis surkha Marshall, 1882
Mycalesis oroatis ustulataDistant, 1885

- Mycalesis orseis nautilus Butler, 1867
- Mycalesis patiana Eliot, 1969
- Mycalesis perseus (Fabricius, 1775)

Mycalesis perseus tabitha (Fabricius, 1793)
Mycalesis perseus cepheus Butler, 1867

- Mycalesis perseoides (Moore, [1892])
- Mycalesis sangaica tunicula Fruhstorfer, 1911
- Mycalesis siamica Riley & Godfrey, 1921
- Mycalesis suaveolens duguidi Tytler, 1926
- Mycalesis thailandica Aoki & Yamaguchi, 1984
- Mycalesis visala Moore, [1858]

Mycalesis visala visala Moore, [1858]
Mycalesis visala phamis Talbot & Corbet, 1939

genus: Coelites

- Coelites nothis Westwood, [1851]

Coelites nothis adamsoni Moore, 1891
Coelites nothis nothis Westwood, [1850]
Coelites nothis sylvarum Fruhstorfer, [1902]
Coelites nothis adamsoni Moore, 1891

- Coelites enptychioides humilis Butler, 1867
- Coelites epiminthia Westwood, [1851]

Coelites epiminthia epiminthia Westwood, [1851]
Coelites epiminthia binghami Moore, 1891

genus: Erites

- Erites angularis angularis Moore, [1879]
- Erites argentina delia Martin, 1909
- Erites falcipennis Wood-Mason & de Niceville, 1883

Erites falcipennis falcipennis Wood-Mason & de Niceville, 1883

- Erites medura rotundata de Niceville, 1893

genus: Ragadia

- Ragadia critias Riley & Godfrey, 1921
- Ragadia makuta siponta Fruhstorfer, 1911
- Ragadia crisilda de Niceville, 1892

Ragadia crisilda crisilda de Niceville, 1892
Ragadia crisilda critolaus de Niceville, 1893

genus: Acropolis

- Acropolis thalia thalia (Leech, 1891)

genus: Zipaetis

- Zipaetis scylax Hewitson, [1863]
- Zipaetis unipupillata Lee, 1962

Zipaetis unipupillata unipupillata Lee, 1962
Zipaetis unipupillata annamicus Monastyrskii & Devyatkin, 2000

genus: Ypthima

- Ypthima affectata Elwes & Edwards, 1893
- Ypthima akbar Talbot, 1947
- Ypthima atra Cantlie & Norman, 1959
- Ypthima baldus (Fabricius, 1775)

Ypthima baldus baldus (Fabricius, 1775)
Ypthima baldus newboldi Distant, 1882

- Ypthima confusa Shirozu & Shima, 1977
- Ypthima conjuncta monticola Uémura & Koiwaya, 2000
- Ypthima daclaca Uémura & Monastyrskii, 2004
- Ypthima dohertyi (Moore, [1893])

Ypthima dohertyi dohertyi (Moore, [1893])
Ypthima dohertyi mossmani Eliot, 1967

- Ypthima evansi evansi Eliot, 1967
- Ypthima fasciata torone Fruhstorfer, 1911
- Ypthima frontierii Uémura & Monastyrskii, 2000
- Ypthima huebneri Kirby, 1871
- Ypthima iarba de Niceville, 1895
- Ypthima imitans Elwes & Edwards, 1893
- Ypthima lisandra (Cramer, [1780])

Ypthima lisandra lisandra (Cramer, [1780])
Ypthima lisandra bara Evans, 1923

- Ypthima nebulosa Aoki & Uémura, 1982
- Ypthima norma Westwood, 1832

Ypthima norma burmana Evans, 1923
Ypthima norma annamitica Fruhstorfer, 1911

- Ypthima pandocus corticaria Butler, [1879]
- Ypthima persimilis Elwes & Edwards, 1893
- Ypthima philomela peguana Evans, 1923
- Ypthima praenubila praenubila Leech, 1891
- Ypthima pseudosavara Uémura & Monastyrskii, 2000
- Ypthima sakra (Moore, [1858])

Ypthima sakra austeni (Moore, [1862])
Ypthima sakra leechi Forster, 1948

- Ypthima sarcaposa Fruhstorferi, 1911
- Ypthima savara Grose-Smith, 1887

Ypthima savara savara Grose-Smith, 1887
Ypthima savara tonkiniana Fruhstorfer, 1911

- Ypthima similis Elwes & Edwards, 1893
- Ypthima singorensis Aoki & Uémura, 1984

Ypthima singorensis singorensis Aoki & Uémura, 1984
Ypthima singorensis indosinica Uémura & Monastyrskii, 2004

- Ypthima tappana selinuntioides Mell, 1942
- Ypthima sobrina Elwes & Edwards, 1893
- Ypthima watsoni (Moore, [1893])

Ypthima watsoni watsoni (Moore, [1893])
Ypthima watsoni peninsulae Aoki & Uémura, 1984
Ypthima watsoni inouei Shirozu & Shima, 1977

- Ypthima yunosukei Aoki & Uémura, 1984

genus: Callerebia

- Callerebia annada orixa Moore, 1872
- Callerebia narasingha dohertyi (Evans, 1923)
- Callerebia suroia Tytler, 1914

genus: Aulocera

- Aulocera loha Doherty, 1886

subfamily: Libytheinae

genus: Libythea

- Libythea celtis formosana Fruhstorfer, 1909
- Libythea geoffroy philippina Staudinger, 1889

== See also ==
- Butterflies of Indochina
- List of butterflies of China (Palearctic and Indomalayan realms)
- List of butterflies of Peninsular Malaysia (Indomalayan realm)
- List of butterflies of Singapore (Indomalayan realm)
- List of butterflies of the Philippines (Palearctic and Indomalayan realms)
- List of butterflies of Sulawesi (Australasian realm)
- List of butterflies of Papua New Guinea (Australasian realm)
- Butterflies of Asia
- Lists of biota of Asia
- Lists of butterflies by location
