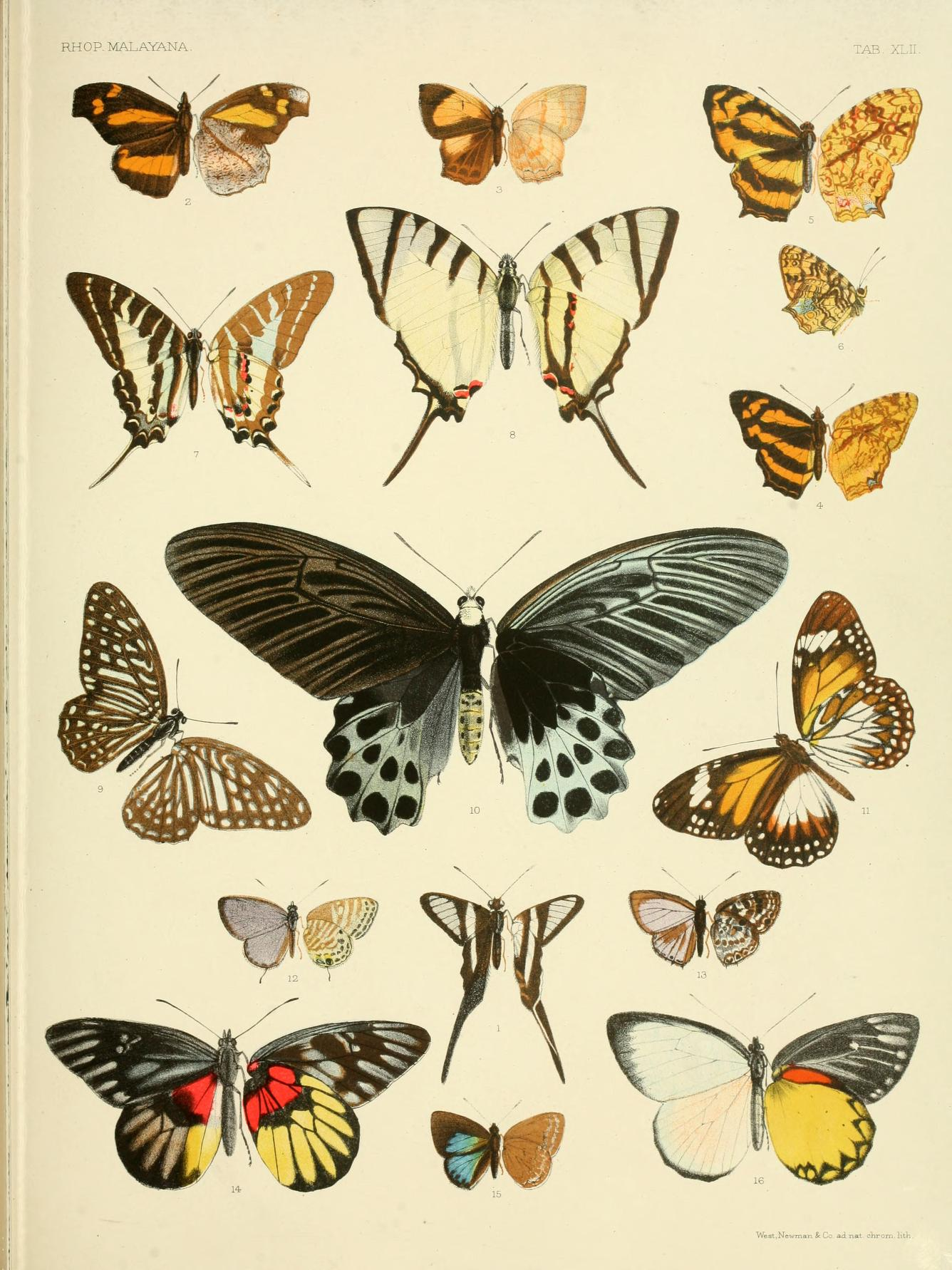
- Deramas livens in Rhopalocera Malayana (figure15).

Scientific classification
- Kingdom: Animalia
- Phylum: Arthropoda
- Class: Insecta
- Order: Lepidoptera
- Family: Lycaenidae
- Genus: Deramas
- Species: D. livens

Binomial name
- Deramas livens Distant, 1886

= Deramas livens =

Species of butterfly

Deramas livens is a butterfly in the family Lycaenidae. It was described by William Lucas Distant in 1886. It is found in the Indomalayan realm.Above it is lustrous dark blue, the margins of the wings and the veins black, the whole costal and apical region darkened. Under surface reddish ochreous-brown with an irregular post-median line which is dentate in the hindwing and distally bordered with a lighter colour

== Subspecies ==
- D. l. livens Peninsular Malaya, Thailand, Sumatra, Borneo
- D. l. evansi Eliot, 1964 Burma (Tenasserim, Mergui)
