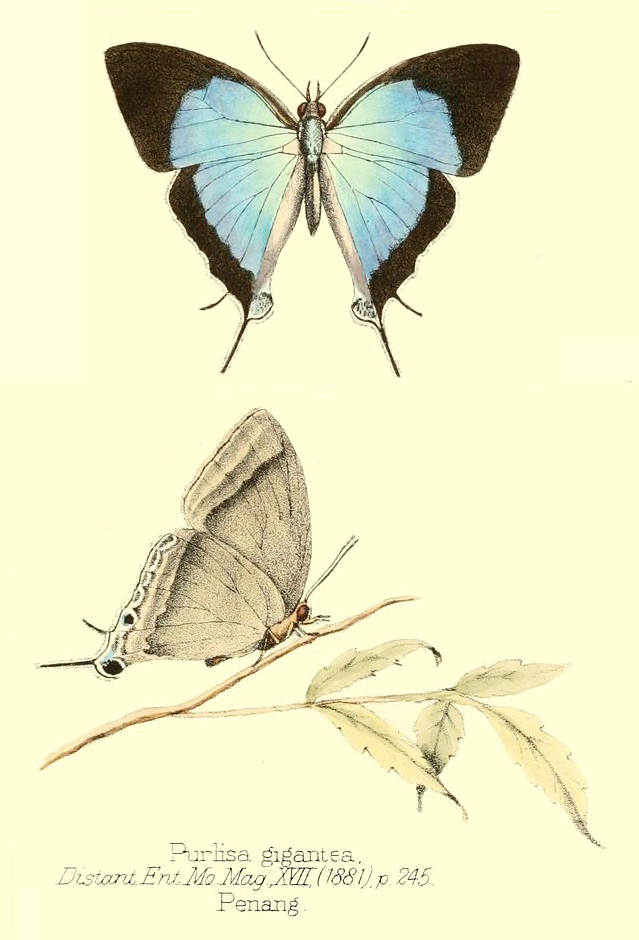

Scientific classification
- Kingdom: Animalia
- Phylum: Arthropoda
- Class: Insecta
- Order: Lepidoptera
- Family: Lycaenidae
- Genus: Purlisa
- Species: P. gigantea

Binomial name
- Purlisa gigantea (Distant, 1881)

Synonyms
- Iolaus (Purlisa) giganteus Distant, 1881; Purlisa gigantea borneana Fruhstorfer, 1904

= Purlisa gigantea =

Species of butterfly

Purlisa gigantea is a butterfly in the family Lycaenidae. It was described by William Lucas Distant in 1881. It is found in the Indomalayan realm, where it has been recorded from Thailand, Peninsular Malaysia, Sumatra and Borneo. The butterfly is uncommon in primary forests at low to moderate elevations (Alt. 100 - 800m) and often rest on the underside of leaves.
