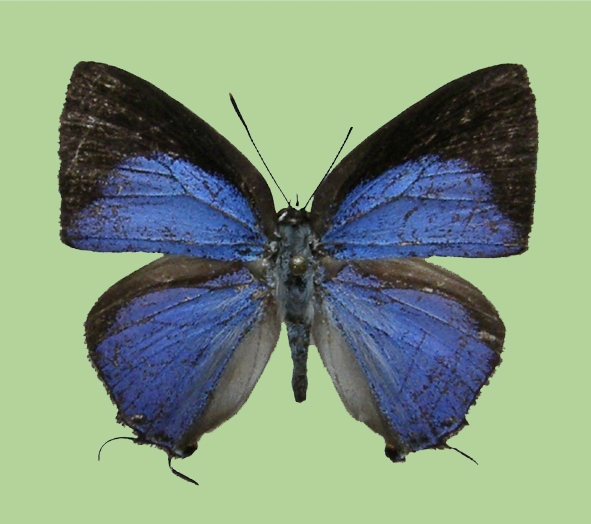
- Male upperside
- Male underside

Scientific classification
- Kingdom: Animalia
- Phylum: Arthropoda
- Clade: Pancrustacea
- Class: Insecta
- Order: Lepidoptera
- Family: Lycaenidae
- Genus: Tajuria
- Species: T. matsutaroi
- Subspecies: T. m. motokoae

Trinomial name
- Tajuria matsutaroi motokoae H. Hayashi, 2011

= Tajuria matsutaroi motokoae =

Subspecies of butterfly

Tajuria matsutaroi motokoae is a butterfly of the family Lycaenidae. It is a subspecies of Tajuria matsutaroi. This subspecies is rarely found on Leyte island in the Philippines. Its forewing length is 16–19 mm. Subspecies motokoae is distinguishable from the nominotypical subspecies by the following characters of the upperside: 1) ground colour is decidedly darker and clearly tinged with purple, while only slightly tinged with pale purple in subspecies matsutaroi, 2) black border is broader in spaces 1b, 2 and the upper part of the cell on the forewing, 3) in the female, the upperside costal area is blackish, whereas it is whitish in subspecies matsutaroi.

Etymology. The subspecific name is dedicated to Mrs Motoko UEMURA in Higashiosaka-shi, Japan.
