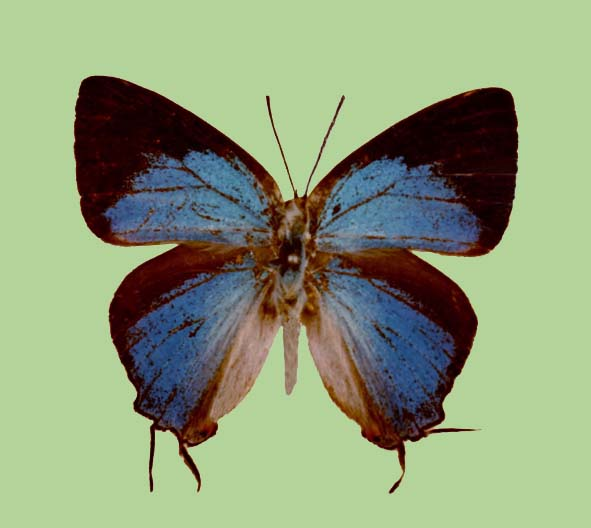
- Male upperside
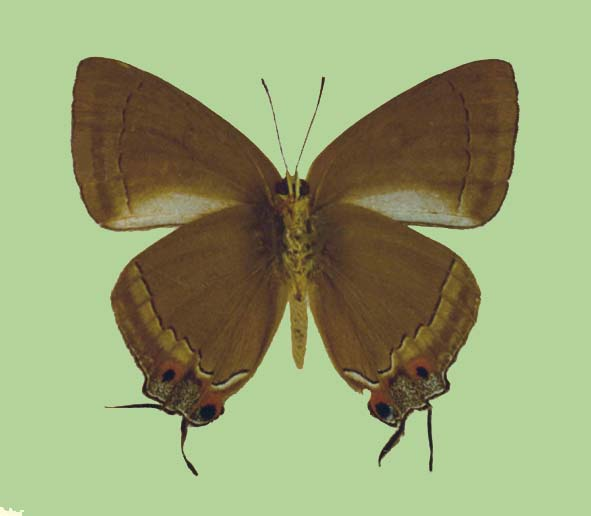
- Male underside

Scientific classification
- Kingdom: Animalia
- Phylum: Arthropoda
- Clade: Pancrustacea
- Class: Insecta
- Order: Lepidoptera
- Family: Lycaenidae
- Genus: Tajuria
- Species: T. deudorix
- Subspecies: T. d. yuhkichii

Trinomial name
- Tajuria deudorix yuhkichii H. Hayashi, 1984

= Tajuria deudorix yuhkichii =

Subspecies of butterfly

Tajuria deudorix yuhkichii is a subspecies of the butterfly Tajuria deudorix in the family Lycaenidae. The subspecies was first described by Hisakazu Hayashi in 1984. It is found in Palawan in the Philippines.

Etymology. The subspecific name is dedicated to Mr. Yuhkichi HAYASHI, the brother of the author.
