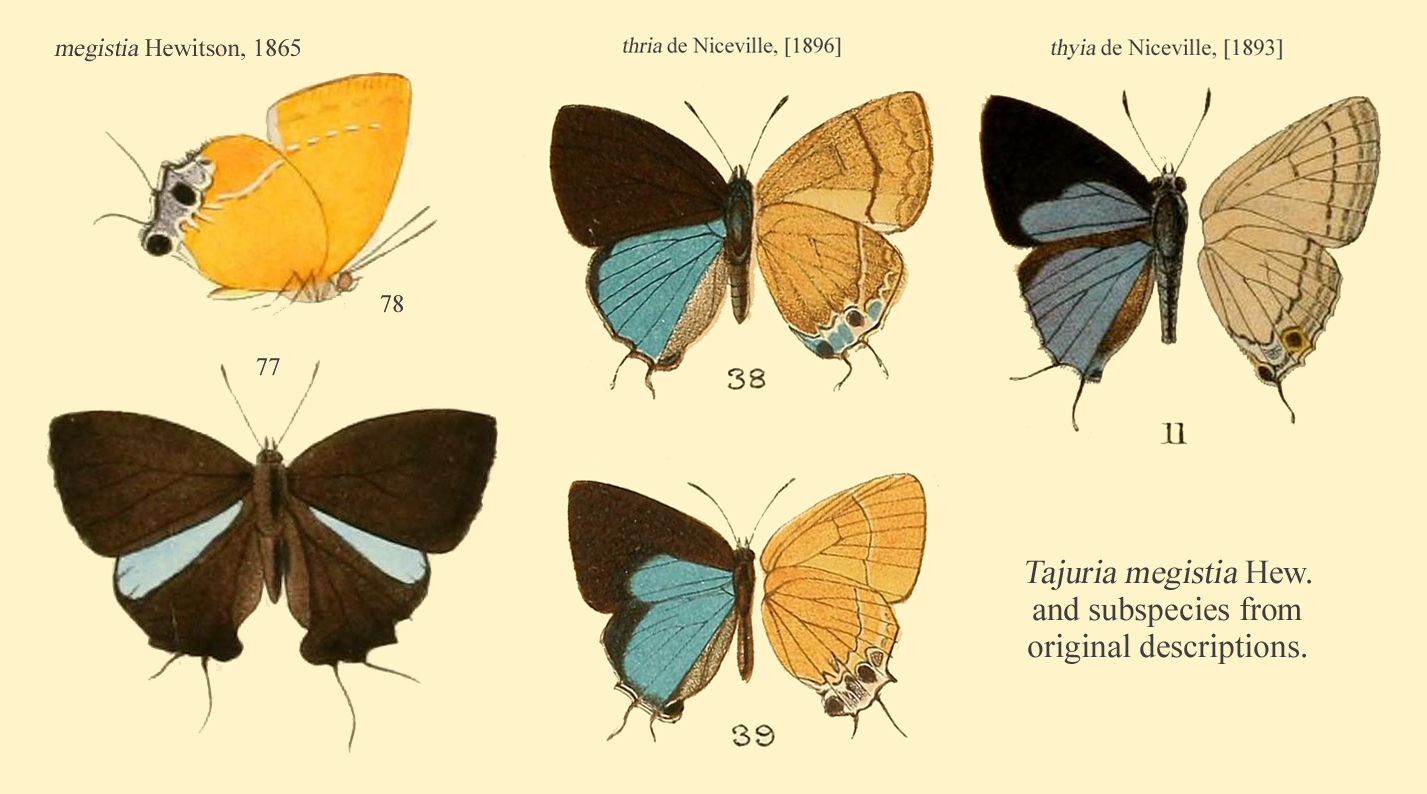
- Tajuria megistia Hewitson, and subspecies from original descriptions (thyia =T. a. albiplaga

Scientific classification
- Kingdom: Animalia
- Phylum: Arthropoda
- Class: Insecta
- Order: Lepidoptera
- Family: Lycaenidae
- Genus: Tajuria
- Species: T. megistia

Binomial name
- Tajuria megistia (Hewitson, 1869)

= Tajuria megistia =

Species of butterfly

Tajuria megistia, the black royal is a species of lycaenid or blue butterfly found in the Indomalayan realm.

== Subspecies ==
- T. m. megistia Assam
- T. m. thria de Nicéville, [1896] Burma, Peninsular Malaya, Sumatra
