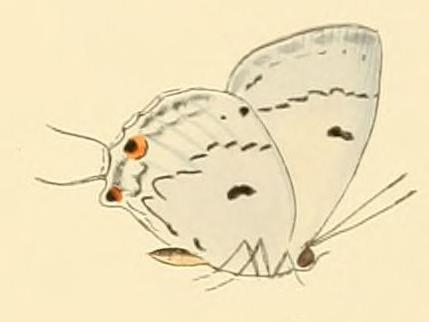

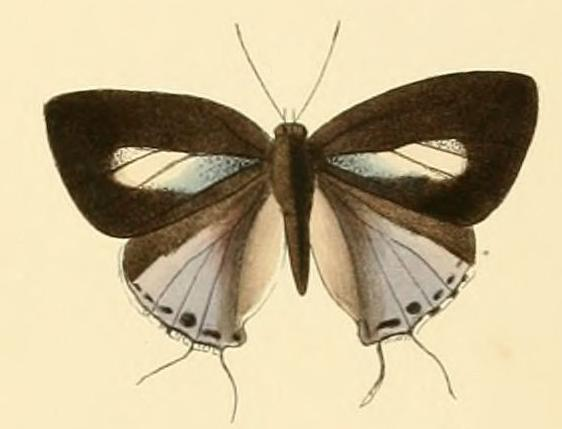

Scientific classification
- Kingdom: Animalia
- Phylum: Arthropoda
- Class: Insecta
- Order: Lepidoptera
- Family: Lycaenidae
- Genus: Tajuria
- Species: T. illurgis

Binomial name
- Tajuria illurgis (Hewitson, 1869)

Synonyms
- Iolaus illurgis Hewitson, 1869; Pratapa illurgis tattaka Araki, 1949

= Tajuria illurgis =

Species of butterfly

Tajuria illurgis, the white royal, is a butterfly in the family Lycaenidae. It is found in Asia.

The larvae feed on Taxillus nigrans and Taxillus rhododendricolius.

== Subspecies ==
- Tajuria illurgis illurgis (Bhutan, Assam, northern Thailand, Yunnan)
- Tajuria illurgis tattaka (Araki, 1949) (Taiwan)
