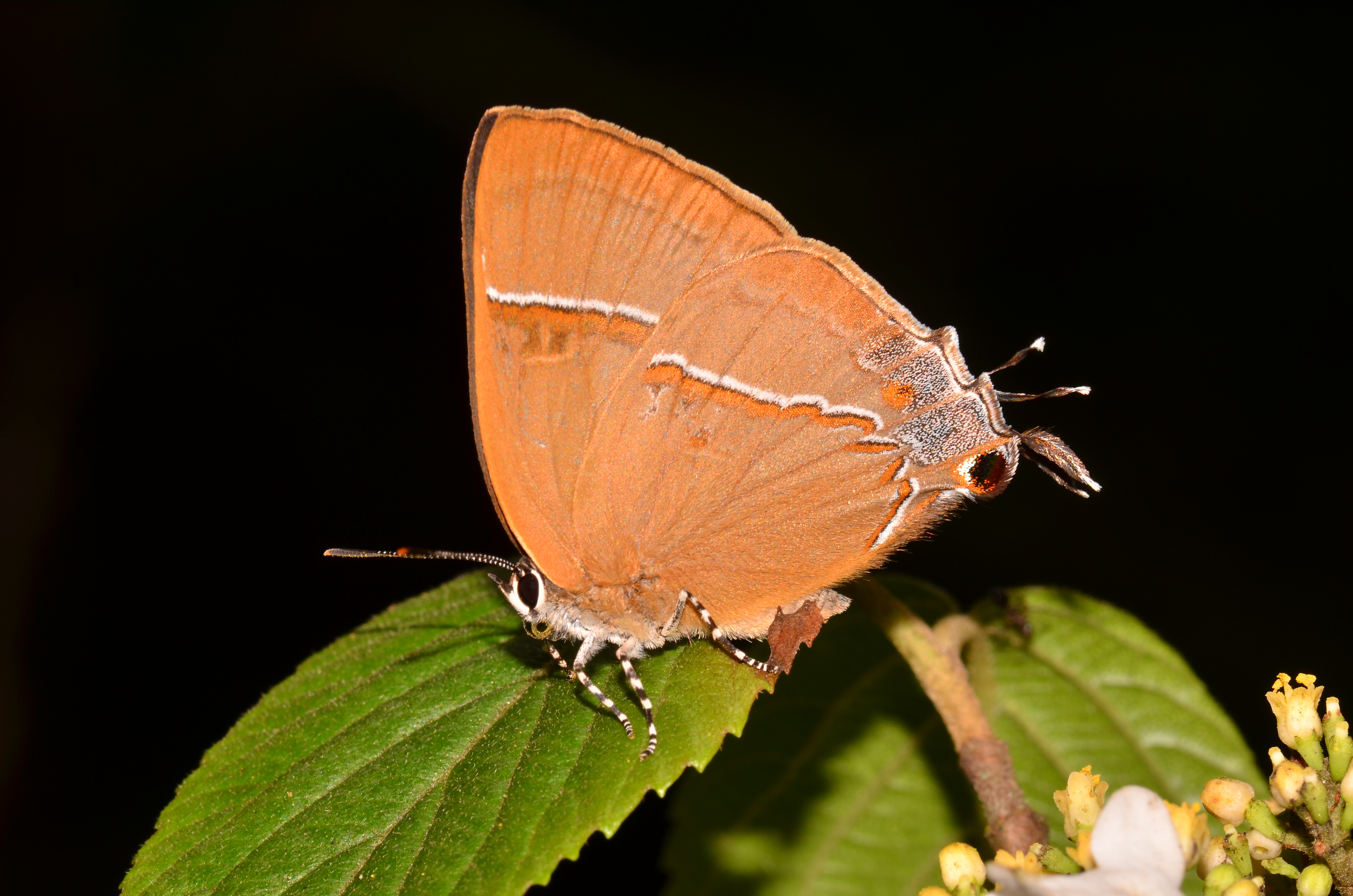

Scientific classification
- Domain: Eukaryota
- Kingdom: Animalia
- Phylum: Arthropoda
- Class: Insecta
- Order: Lepidoptera
- Family: Lycaenidae
- Genus: Tajuria
- Species: T. caelurea

Binomial name
- Tajuria caelurea Nire, 1920

= Tajuria caelurea =

Species of butterfly

Tajuria caelurea is a species of lycaenid or blue butterfly found in the Indomalayan realm. It is endemic to Formosa.The larva feeds on Taxillus limprichtii.
