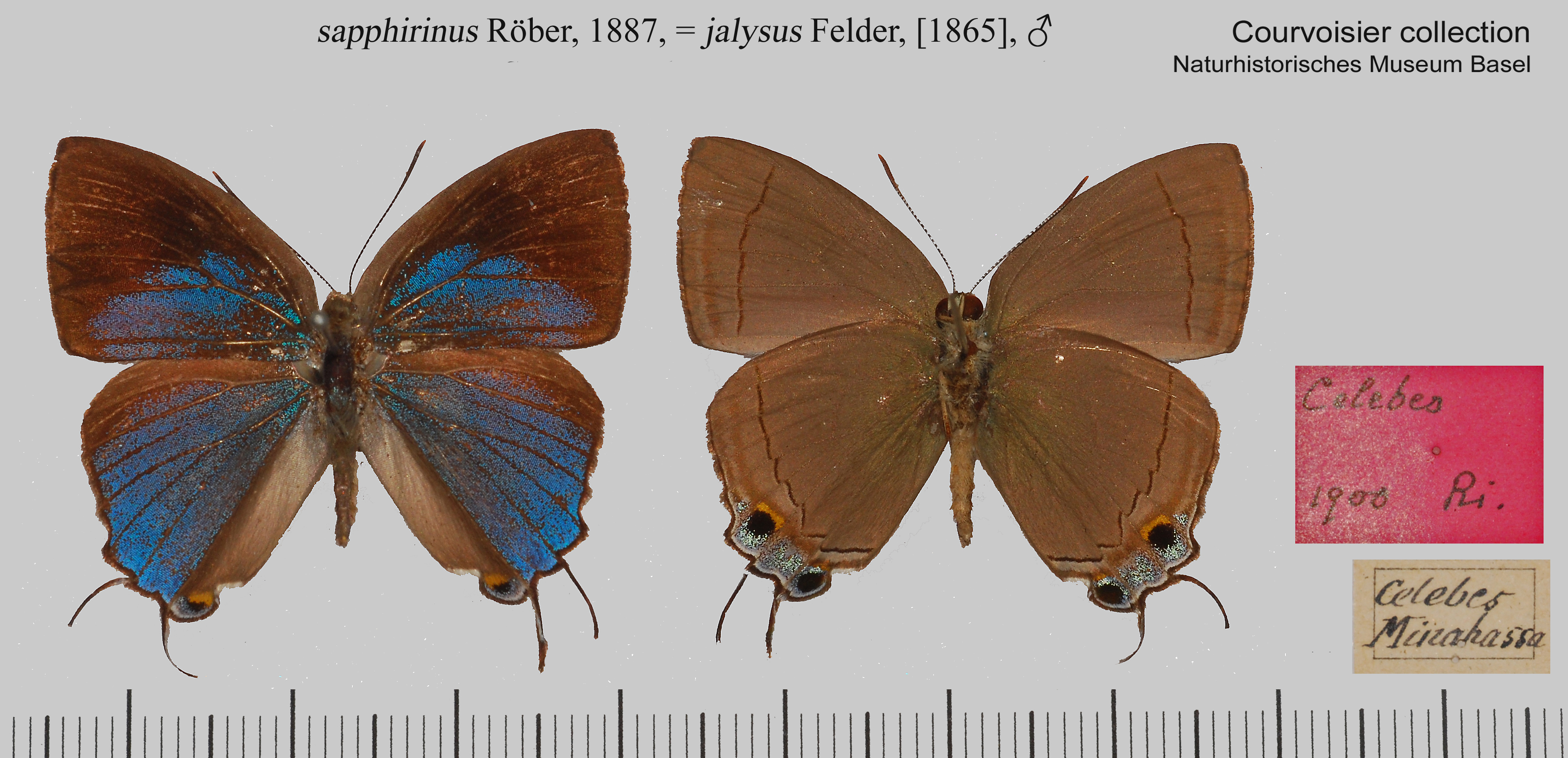
- Tajuria mantra jalysus Courvoisier Collection, Basel
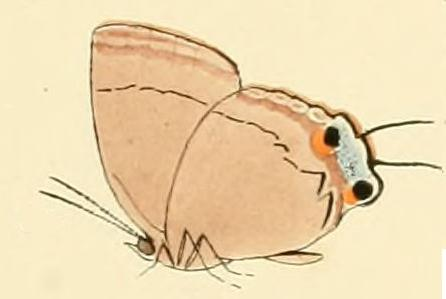

Scientific classification
- Kingdom: Animalia
- Phylum: Arthropoda
- Class: Insecta
- Order: Lepidoptera
- Family: Lycaenidae
- Genus: Tajuria
- Species: T. mantra

Binomial name
- Tajuria mantra (C. & R. Felder, 1860)

Synonyms
- Hypolycaena mantra C. Felder & R. Felder, 1860; Pseudolycaena mantra; Iolaus mantra; Myrina jalysus C. & R. Felder, 1865; Iolaus jalysus; Tajuria jalysus; Tajuria mantra lucrosa Fruhstorfer, [1912]; Tajuria visayana M. & T. Okano, 1991

= Tajuria mantra =

Species of butterfly

Tajuria mantra, the Felder's royal, is a butterfly in the family Lycaenidae. It is found in Asia.

The larvae feed on Dendrophthoe and Scurrula species.

== Subspecies ==
- Tajuria mantra mantra (Burma, Thailand, Peninsular Malaya, Sumatra, Borneo)
- Tajuria mantra jalysus (C. & R. Felder, 1865) (Sulawesi, Banggai)
- Tajuria mantra kimia Treadaway & Nuyda, [1998] (Philippinen: Sanga Sanga)
- Tajuria mantra maroneia Fruhstorfer, 1912 (Nias)
- Tajuria mantra kitamurae Schroeder, Treadaway & Nuyda, 1999 (Philippinen: Luzon)
- Tajuria mantra mesambria Fruhstorfer, 1912 (Java)
- Tajuria mantra vergara Semper, 1890 (Philippines)
