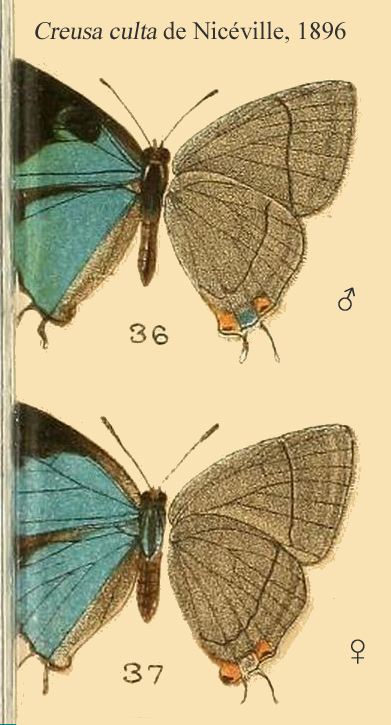
- Tajuria culta, as Creusa culta, from original description.

Scientific classification
- Kingdom: Animalia
- Phylum: Arthropoda
- Clade: Pancrustacea
- Class: Insecta
- Order: Lepidoptera
- Family: Lycaenidae
- Genus: Tajuria
- Species: T. culta

Binomial name
- Tajuria culta (de Nicéville, 1896)

= Tajuria culta =

Species of butterfly

Tajuria culta, also called the black-branded royal, is a species of lycaenid or blue butterfly found in the Indomalayan realm (Assam, Burma, Thailand).
