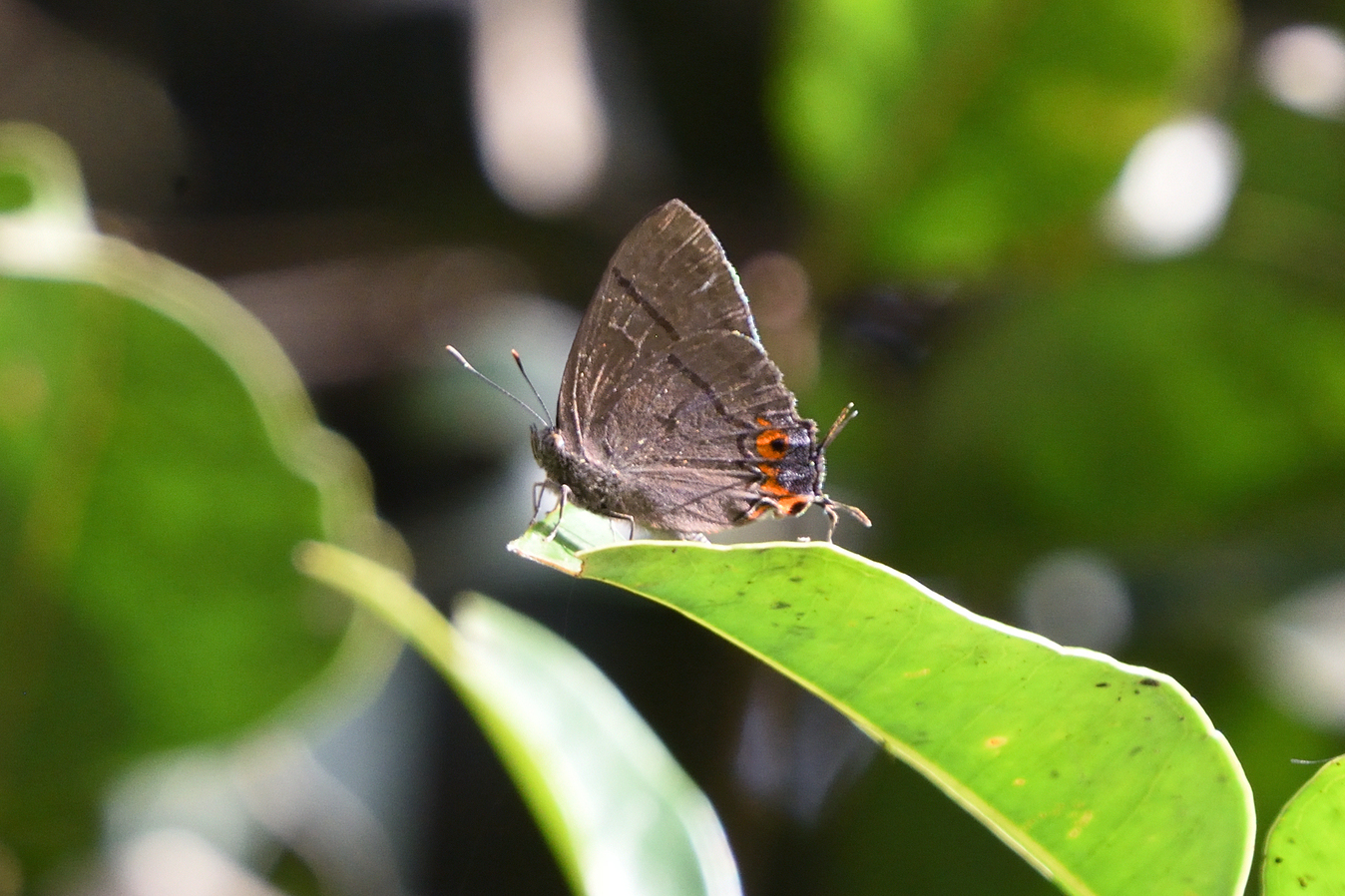
- Tajuria discalis (Bali, Indonesia).

Scientific classification
- Domain: Eukaryota
- Kingdom: Animalia
- Phylum: Arthropoda
- Class: Insecta
- Order: Lepidoptera
- Family: Lycaenidae
- Genus: Tajuria
- Species: T. discalis

Binomial name
- Tajuria discalis Fruhstorfer, 1897

= Tajuria discalis =

Species of butterfly

Tajuria discalis is a species of lycaenid or blue butterfly found in the Indomalayan realm. It was first described by German entomologist Hans Fruhstorfer in 1897.

== Subspecies ==
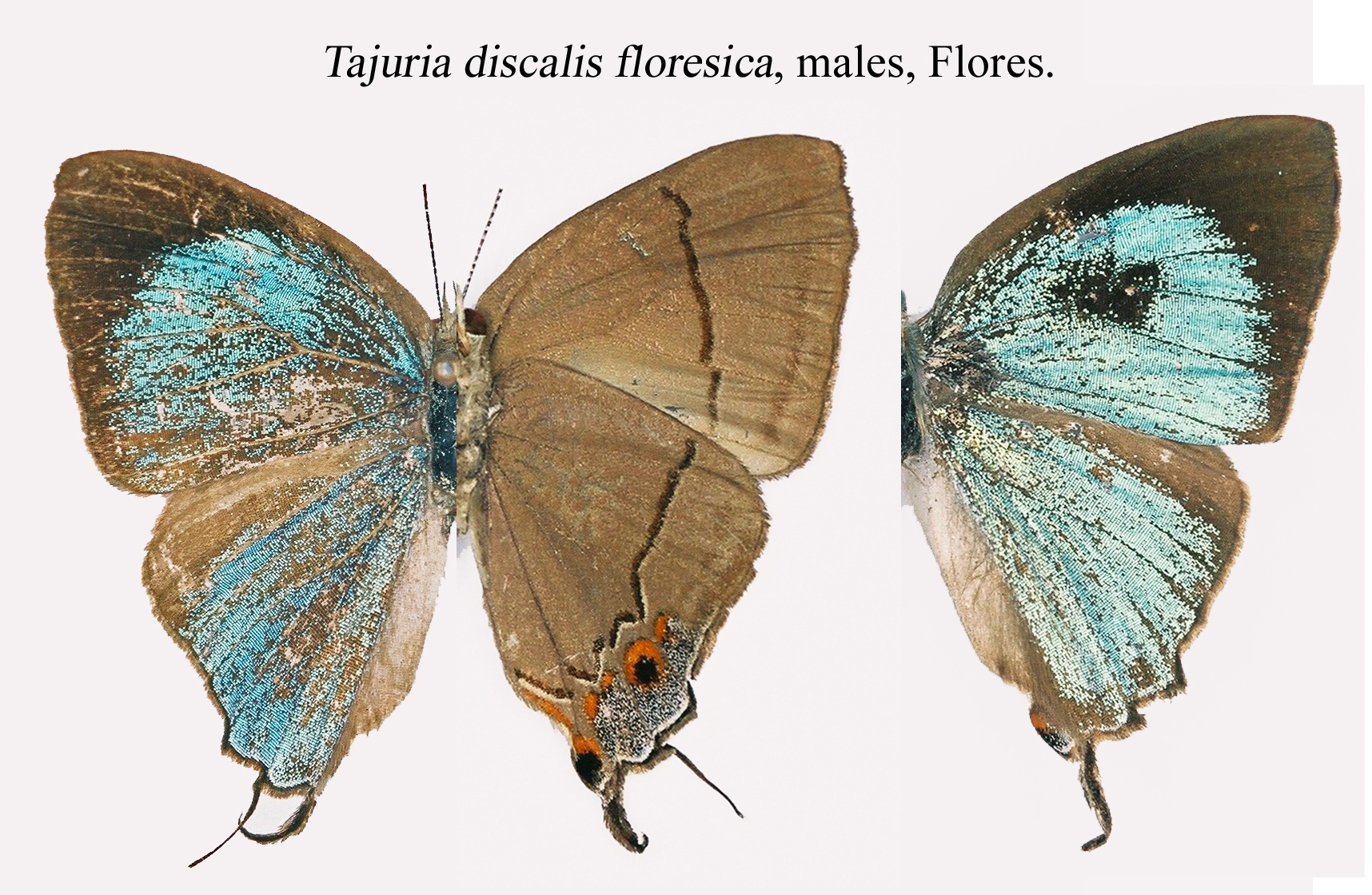
Tajuria discalis floresica

The following subspecies have been described:

- T. d. discalis Lesser Sunda Islands
- T. d. floresica Murayama, 1983 Flores
- T. d. centralis Morinaka & Shinkawa, 1996 Bali
- T. d. triangularis Morinaka & Shinkawa, 1996 Java
