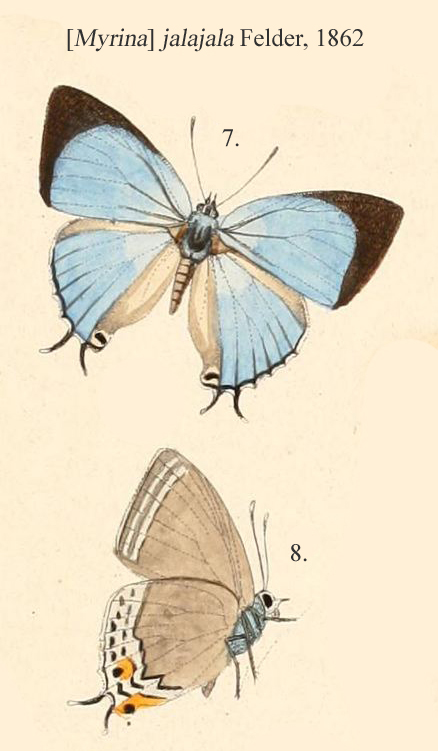
- Tajuria jalajala, male from C. & R. Felder 1865.

Scientific classification
- Kingdom: Animalia
- Phylum: Arthropoda
- Class: Insecta
- Order: Lepidoptera
- Family: Lycaenidae
- Genus: Tajuria
- Species: T. jalajala

Binomial name
- Tajuria jalajala (C. & R. Felder, 1865)

= Tajuria jalajala =

Species of butterfly

Tajuria jalajala is a species of lycaenid or blue butterfly found in the Indomalayan realm (Philippines and Borneo).

== Subspecies ==
- T. j. jalajala Philippines.
- T. j. berenis Druce, 1896 Borneo
- T. j. steffi Schröder & Treadaway, 1988
