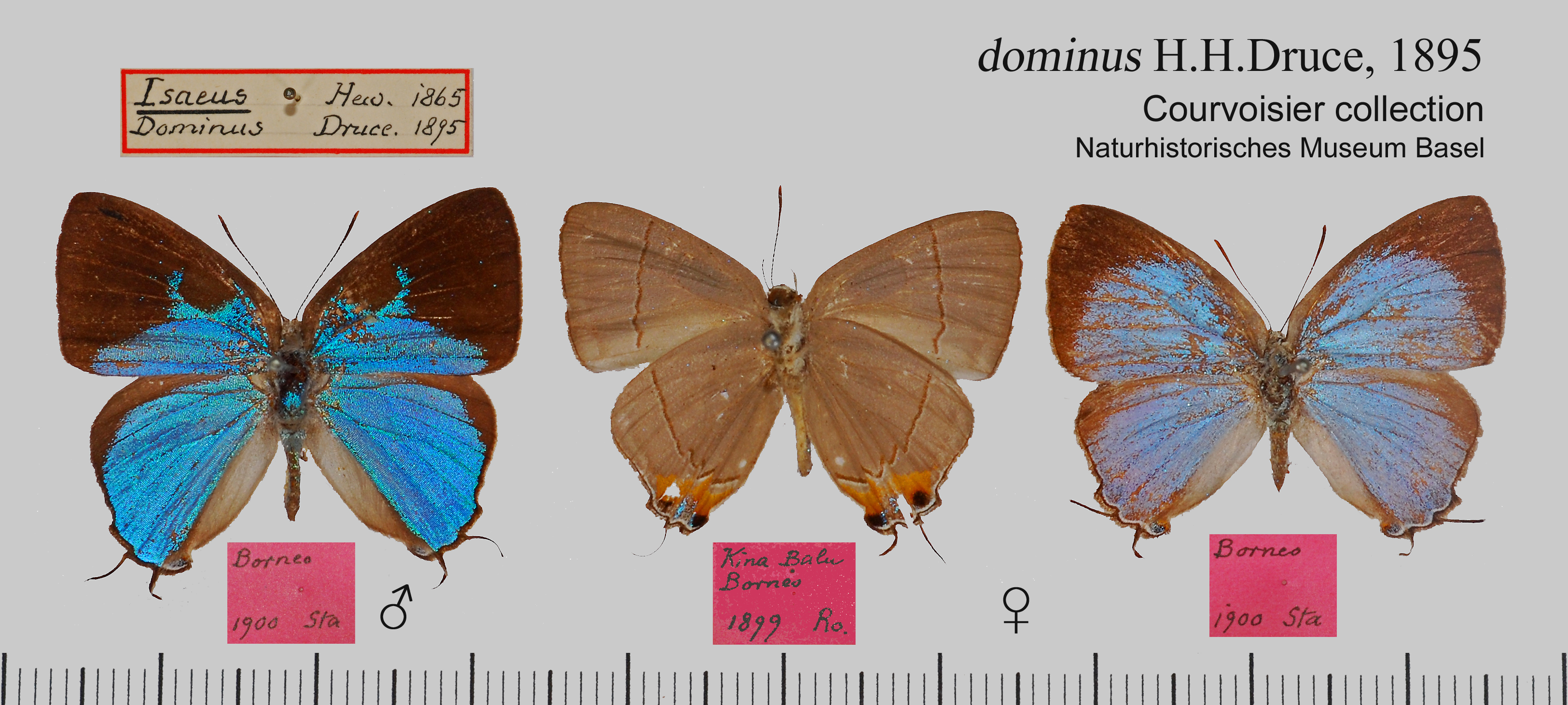

Scientific classification
- Domain: Eukaryota
- Kingdom: Animalia
- Phylum: Arthropoda
- Class: Insecta
- Order: Lepidoptera
- Family: Lycaenidae
- Genus: Tajuria
- Species: T. dominus

Binomial name
- Tajuria dominus Hamilton Herbert Druce, 1895

Synonyms
- Tajuria isaeus pisatis Fruhstorfer, 1912

= Tajuria dominus =

Species of butterfly

Tajuria dominus is a butterfly in the family Lycaenidae. It was described by Hamilton Herbert Druce in 1895. It is found in the Indomalayan realm.

== Subspecies ==
- Tajuria dominus dominus (Borneo, Peninsular Malaya, Singapore, possibly Sumatra)
- Tajuria dominus pisatis Fruhstorfer, 1912 (Java, Bawean)

Tajuria mizunumai was previously listed as a subspecies of Tajuria dominus, but was raised to species status.
