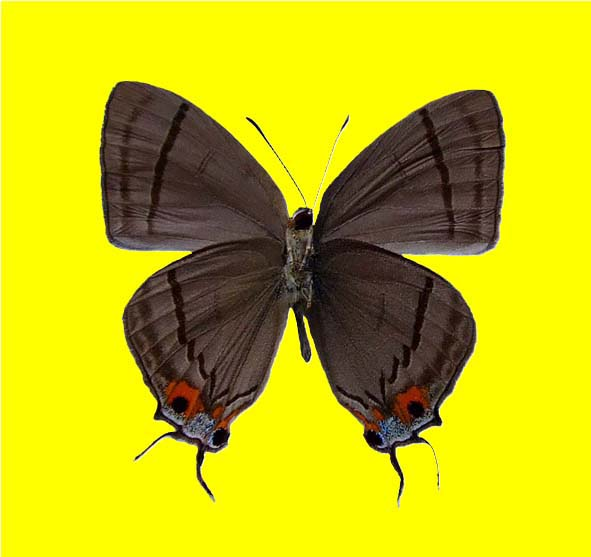
- Male of subspecies T. i. fumiae, underside

Scientific classification
- Kingdom: Animalia
- Phylum: Arthropoda
- Class: Insecta
- Order: Lepidoptera
- Family: Lycaenidae
- Genus: Tajuria
- Species: T. igolotiana

Binomial name
- Tajuria igolotiana (Murayama & Okamura, 1973)

Subspecies
- Tajuria igolotiana igolotiana; Tajuria igolotiana fumiae H.Hayashi, 1984; Tajuria igolotiana nonoyi Schröder, Treadaway & Nuyda, 1999

= Tajuria igolotiana =

- Male of subspecies T. i. fumiae, upperside

Species of butterfly

Tajuria igolotiana is a butterfly of the family Lycaenidae first described by Siuiti Murayama and Hachiro Okamura in 1973. It is endemic to the Philippines and found on Luzon, Mindoro and Mindanao islands. The forewing length is 17–19 mm. Subspecies T. i. fumiae is distributed on Mindanao.

Etymology. The subspecific name is dedicated to Mrs. Fumi KOBASHI, the sister of the author.
