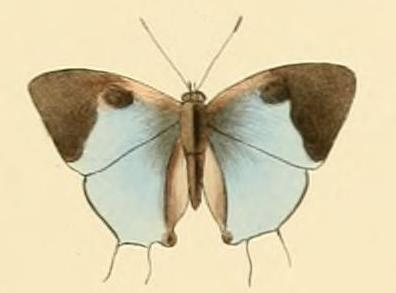

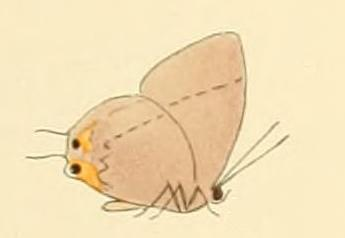

Scientific classification
- Kingdom: Animalia
- Phylum: Arthropoda
- Class: Insecta
- Order: Lepidoptera
- Family: Lycaenidae
- Genus: Tajuria
- Species: T. isaeus

Binomial name
- Tajuria isaeus (Hewitson, 1865)

Synonyms
- Iolaus isaeus Hewitson, 1865; Tajuria verna Corbet, 1940; Tajuria tyro de Nicéville, 1895

= Tajuria isaeus =

Species of butterfly

Tajuria isaeus is a butterfly in the family Lycaenidae. It is found in South-East Asia.

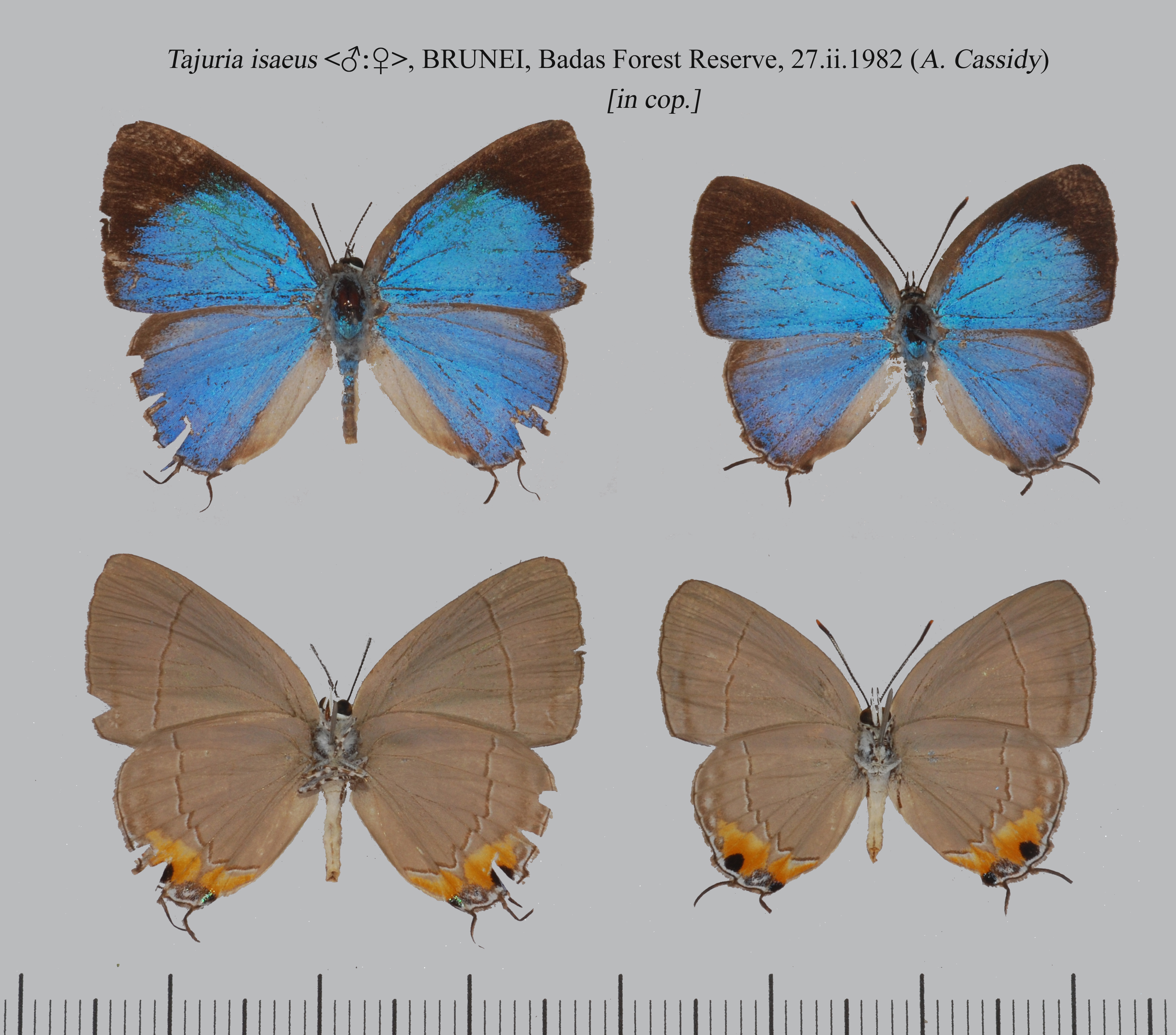

== Subspecies ==
- Tajuria isaeus isaeus (Borneo, Sumatra)
- Tajuria isaeus tyro de Nicéville, 1895 (Burma, northern Thailand)
- Tajuria isaeus verna Corbet, 1940 (southern Thailand, Peninsular Malaya)
