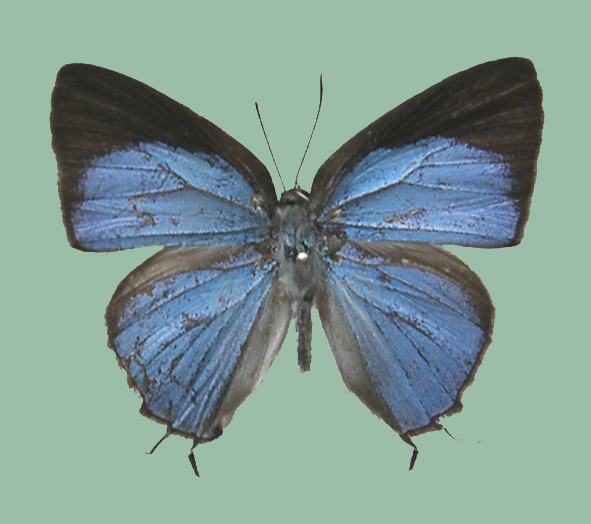
- Male upperside
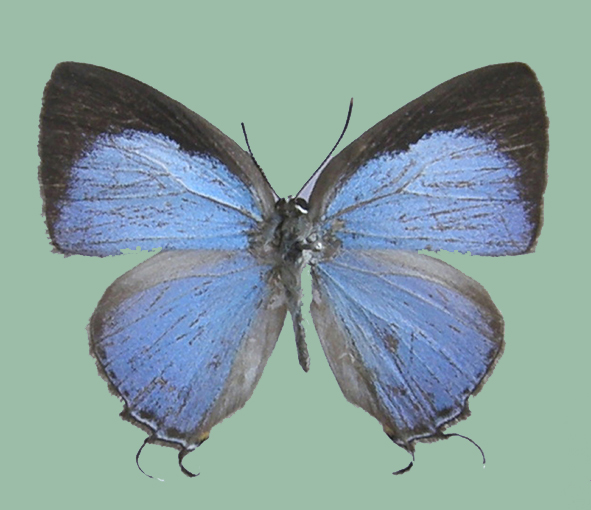
- Female upperside

Scientific classification
- Domain: Eukaryota
- Kingdom: Animalia
- Phylum: Arthropoda
- Class: Insecta
- Order: Lepidoptera
- Family: Lycaenidae
- Genus: Tajuria
- Species: T. matsutaroi

Binomial name
- Tajuria matsutaroi H. Hayashi, 1984

= Tajuria matsutaroi =

Species of butterfly

Tajuria matsutaroi is a butterfly of the family Lycaenidae first described by Hisakazu Hayashi in 1984. It is endemic to the Philippine islands of Mindanao and Leyte. Forewing length is about 16–19 mm. The butterfly is a rare species. The nominotypical subspecies is found only on Mount Apo on Mindanao island and occurs several times a year.

Etymology: The specific name is dedicated to Matsutaro Hayashi, the father of the author.

== Subspecies ==
- Tajuria matsutaroi matsutaroi H. Hayashi, [1984] (Mindanao island)
- Tajuria matsutaroi motokoae H. Hayashi, [2011] (Leyte island)
