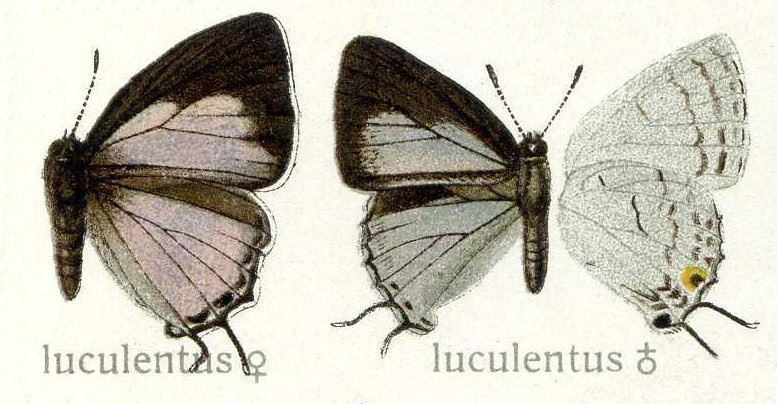
- Female on left, male right

Scientific classification
- Domain: Eukaryota
- Kingdom: Animalia
- Phylum: Arthropoda
- Class: Insecta
- Order: Lepidoptera
- Family: Lycaenidae
- Genus: Tajuria
- Species: T. luculentus

Binomial name
- Tajuria luculentus (Leech, 1887)

Synonyms
- Iolaus luculentus Leech, 1890

= Tajuria luculentus =

Chinese royal

Species of butterfly

Iolaus luculentus, the Chinese royal, is a species of lycaenid or blue butterfly found in Asia.
