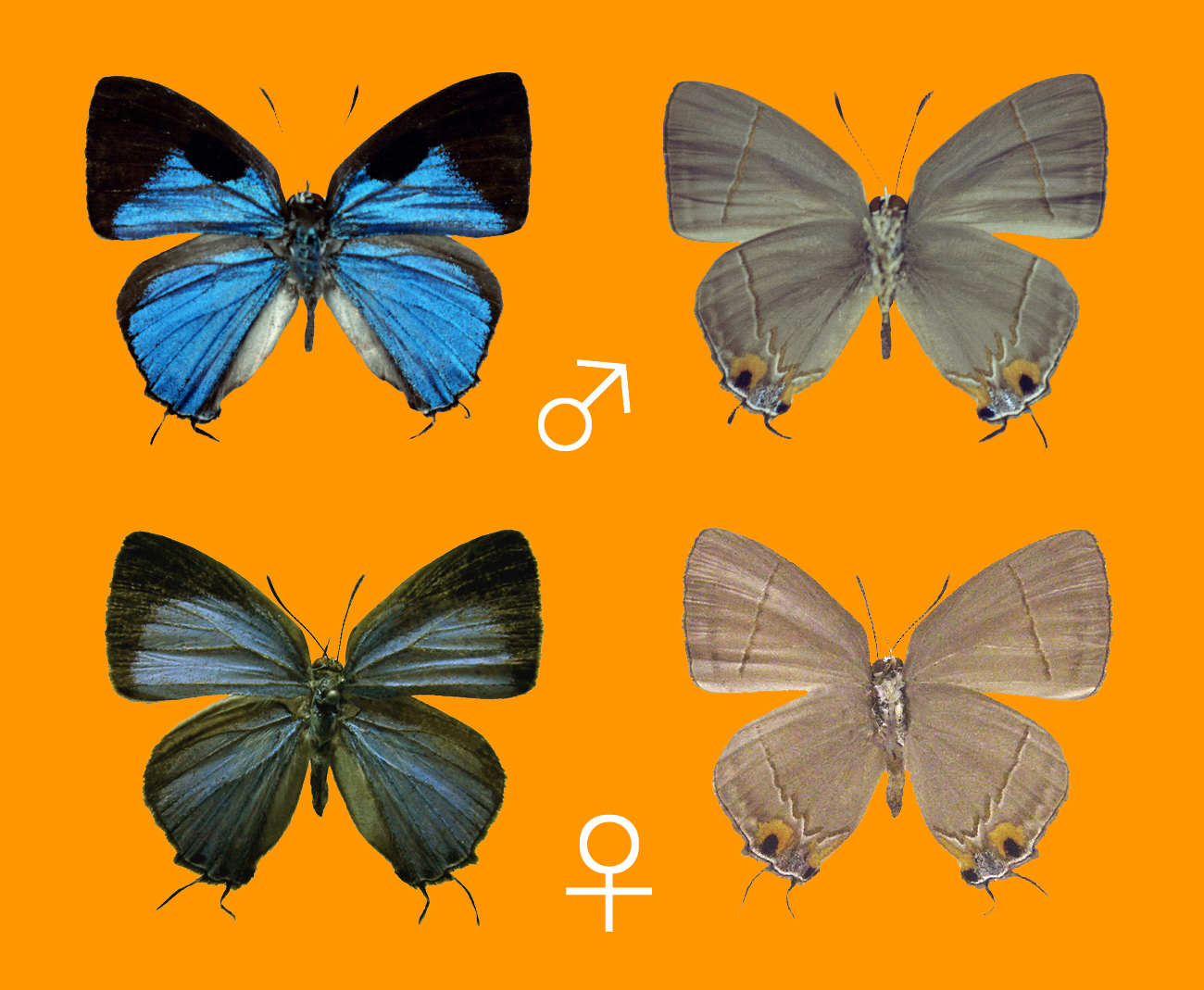
- Male and female

Scientific classification
- Kingdom: Animalia
- Phylum: Arthropoda
- Class: Insecta
- Order: Lepidoptera
- Family: Lycaenidae
- Genus: Tajuria
- Species: T. mizunumai

Binomial name
- Tajuria mizunumai (H. Hayashi, 1978)

Synonyms
- Tajuria dominus mizunumai H. Hayashi, 1978

= Tajuria mizunumai =

Species of butterfly

Tajuria mizunumai is a butterfly of the family Lycaenidae. It is found only on Mindanao in the Philippines. It was originally listed as a subspecies of Tajuria dominus, but was changed species status as Tajuria mizunumai by Colin G. Treadaway in 1995 and by H. Hayashiin 2017.

Etymology: The specific name is dedicated to Tetsuo Mizunuma, a Japanese beetle researcher.
