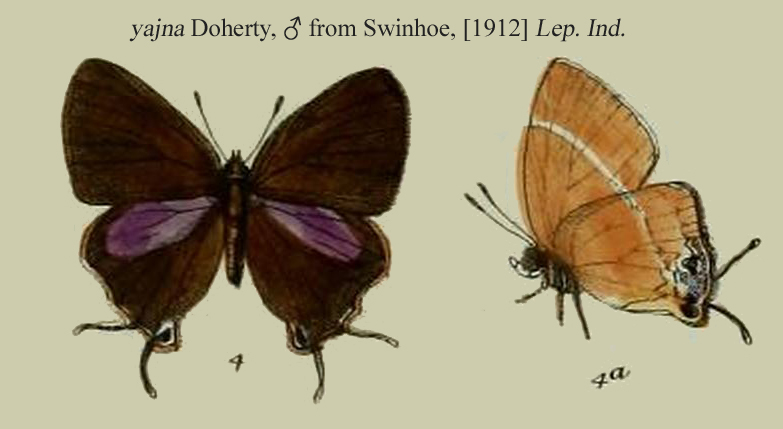

Scientific classification
- Domain: Eukaryota
- Kingdom: Animalia
- Phylum: Arthropoda
- Class: Insecta
- Order: Lepidoptera
- Family: Lycaenidae
- Genus: Tajuria
- Species: T. yajna

Binomial name
- Tajuria yajna (Doherty, 1886)

Synonyms
- Remelana yajna Doherty, 1886; Tajuria cato Druce, 1895; Tajuria istroidea de Nicéville, 1887; Tajuria selangorana Pendlebury & Corbet, 1933

= Tajuria yajna =

Species of butterfly

Tajuria yajna, the chestnut and black royal, is a butterfly in the family Lycaenidae. It was described by William Doherty in 1886. It is found in the Indomalayan realm.

== Subspecies ==
- Tajuria yajna yajna (north-western India)
- Tajuria yajna cato Druce, 1895 (Borneo)
- Tajuria yajna ellisi Evans, [1925] (Burma, Thailand)
- Tajuria yajna istroidea de Nicéville, 1887 (Assam)
- Tajuria yajna selangorana Pendlebury & Corbet, 1933 (Peninsular Malaysia)

Note Yunnan Only one male is known and it shows more similarities to ssp.yajna from N.W. India than to ssp. ellisi Evans from Burma
