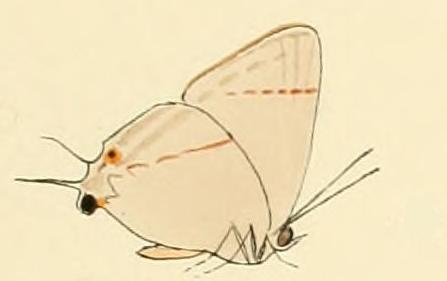

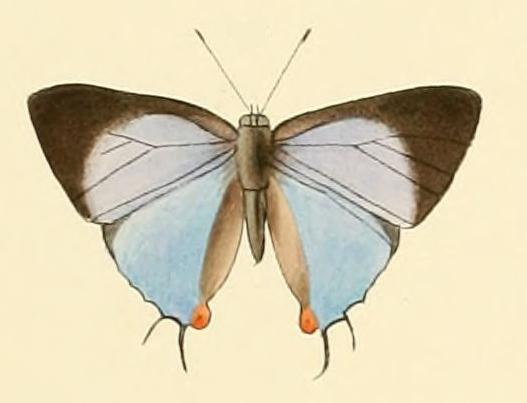

Scientific classification
- Kingdom: Animalia
- Phylum: Arthropoda
- Class: Insecta
- Order: Lepidoptera
- Family: Lycaenidae
- Genus: Tajuria
- Species: T. diaeus

Binomial name
- Tajuria diaeus (Hewitson, 1865)

Synonyms
- Iolaus diaeus Hewitson, 1865; Tajuria thydia Tytler, 1915; Tajuria karenkonis Matsumura, 1929; Tajuria dacia Druce, 1896

= Tajuria diaeus =

Species of butterfly

Tajuria diaeus, the straightline royal, is a butterfly in the family Lycaenidae. It is found in Asia.

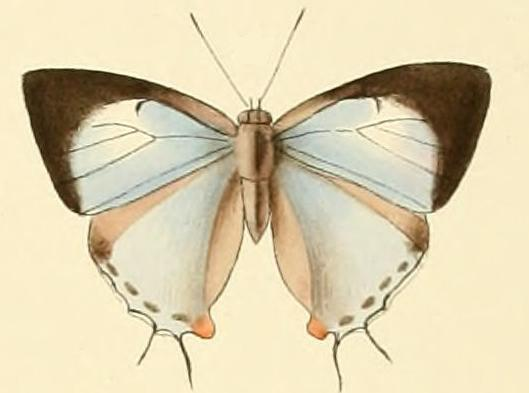

The larvae feed on Taxillus caloreas and Loranthus kaoi.

== Subspecies ==
- Tajuria diaeus diaeus (Assam, Burma, northern Thailand)
- Tajuria diaeus dacia Druce, 1896 (Java)
- Tajuria diaeus karenkonis Matsumura, 1929 (Taiwan)
- Tajuria diaeus mirabilis Y. Seki, 2006 (Sumatra)
