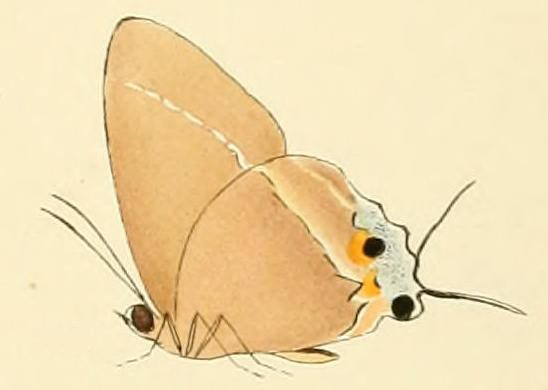

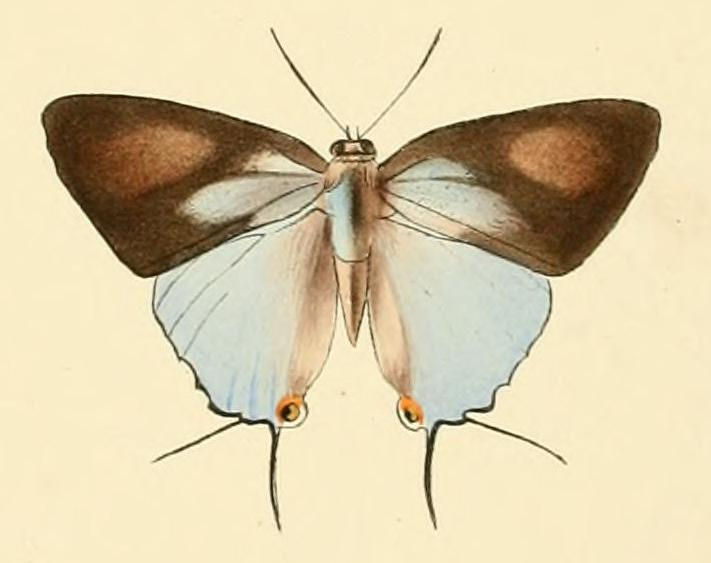

Scientific classification
- Kingdom: Animalia
- Phylum: Arthropoda
- Class: Insecta
- Order: Lepidoptera
- Family: Lycaenidae
- Genus: Tajuria
- Species: T. cyrillus

Binomial name
- Tajuria cyrillus (Hewitson, 1865)

Synonyms
- Iolaus cyrillus Hewitson, 1865

= Tajuria cyrillus =

Species of butterfly

Tajuria cyrillus is a butterfly in the family Lycaenidae. It is found only on Sulawesi in Indonesia.

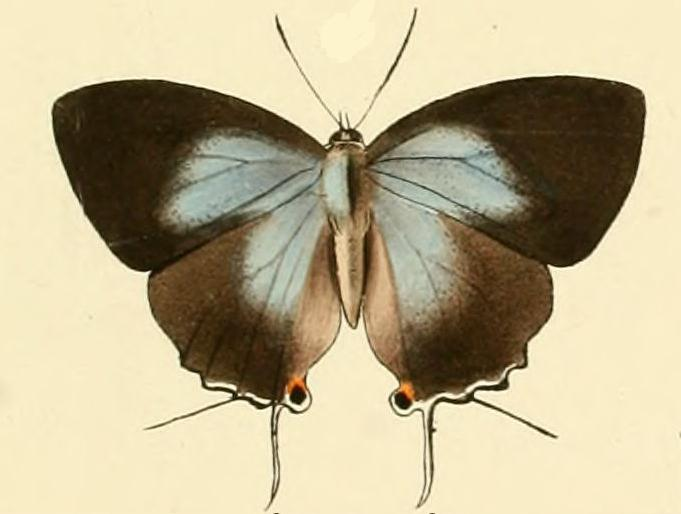

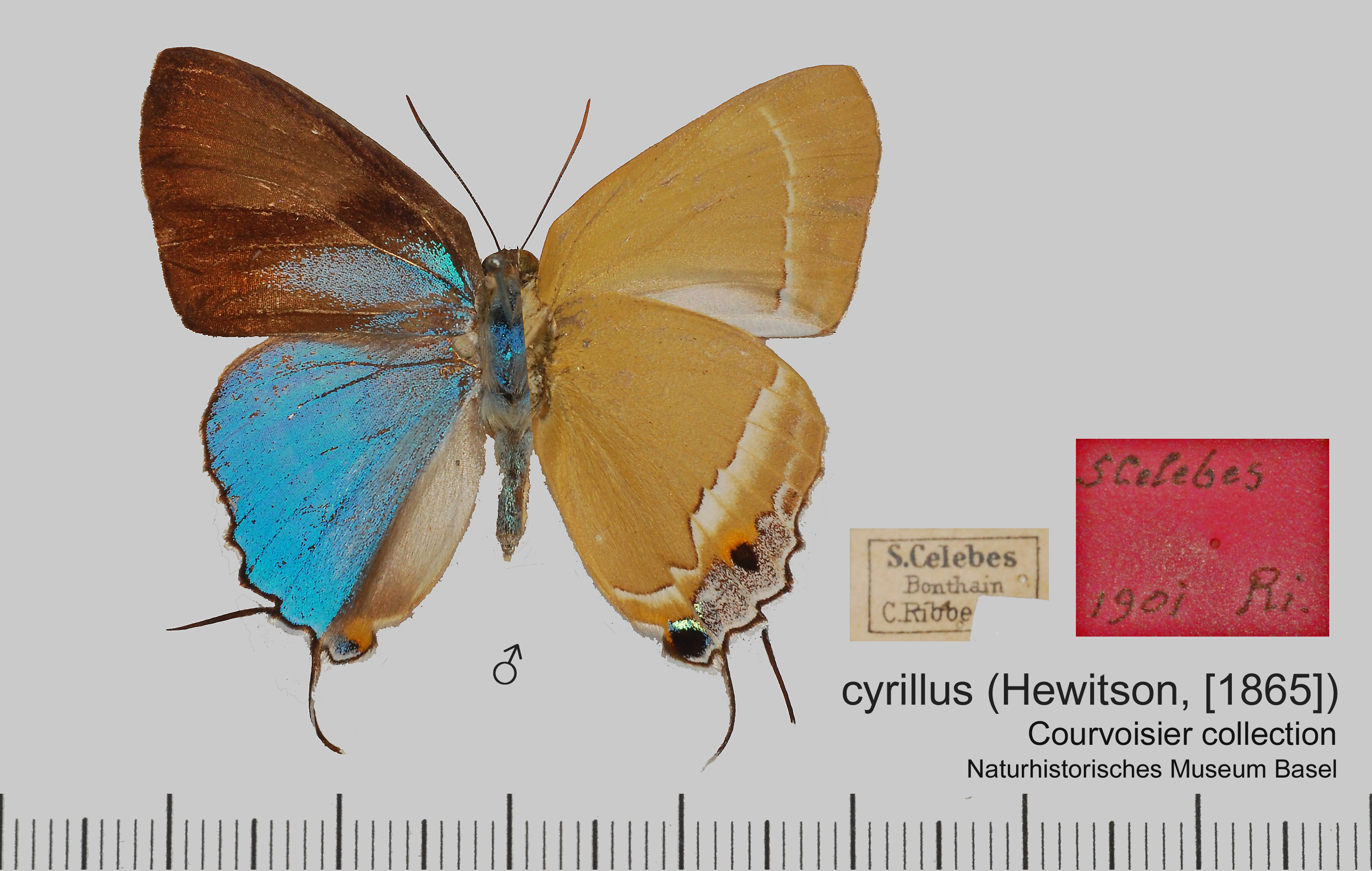
