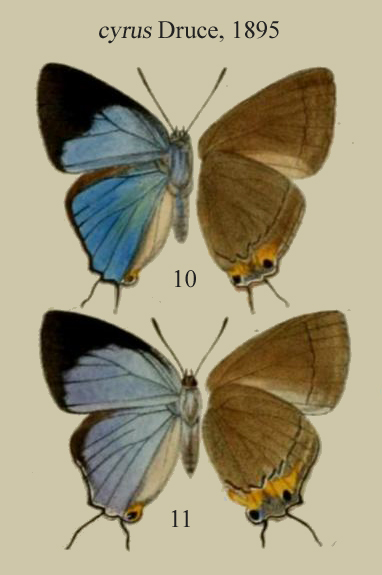
- Tajuria deudorix cyrus male, female from original description

Scientific classification
- Kingdom: Animalia
- Phylum: Arthropoda
- Class: Insecta
- Order: Lepidoptera
- Family: Lycaenidae
- Genus: Tajuria
- Species: T. deudorix

Binomial name
- Tajuria deudorix (Hewitson, 1869)

= Tajuria deudorix =

Species of butterfly

Tajuria deudorix is a species of lycaenid or blue butterfly found in the Indomalayan realm

== Subspecies ==
- T. d. cyrus Druce, 1895 Borneo
- T. d. deudorix Philippines
- T. d. ingeni (Corbet, 1948) Langkawi, Peninsular Malaya, Thailand, Singapore, Sumatra
- T. d. primitivoi Osada, 1987
- T. d. yuhkichi Hayashi, 1984
- T. d. zoletai Osada, 1987 Philippines
