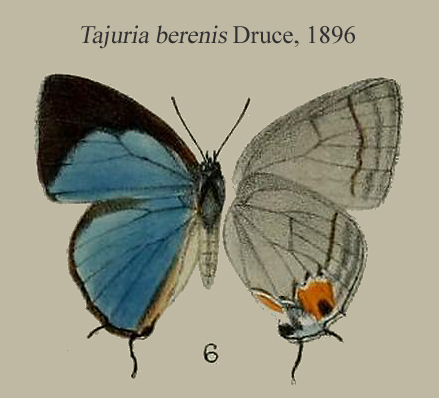

Scientific classification
- Domain: Eukaryota
- Kingdom: Animalia
- Phylum: Arthropoda
- Class: Insecta
- Order: Lepidoptera
- Family: Lycaenidae
- Genus: Tajuria
- Species: T. berenis

Binomial name
- Tajuria berenis H. H. Druce, 1896

Synonyms
- Tajuria jalajala berenis; Tajuria larutensis Pendlebury, 1933; Tajuria berensis [sic] errore H. H. Druce; Seitz, 1927; D'Abrera, 1986: 615; Eliot, 1992: 423.

= Tajuria berenis =

Species of butterfly

Tajuria berenis is a butterfly in the family Lycaenidae. It was described by Hamilton Herbert Druce in 1896. It is found in the Indomalayan realm.

== Subspecies ==
- Tajuria berenis berenis (Borneo, possibly Sumatra)
- Tajuria berenis larutensis Pendlebury, 1933 (western Malaysia)
