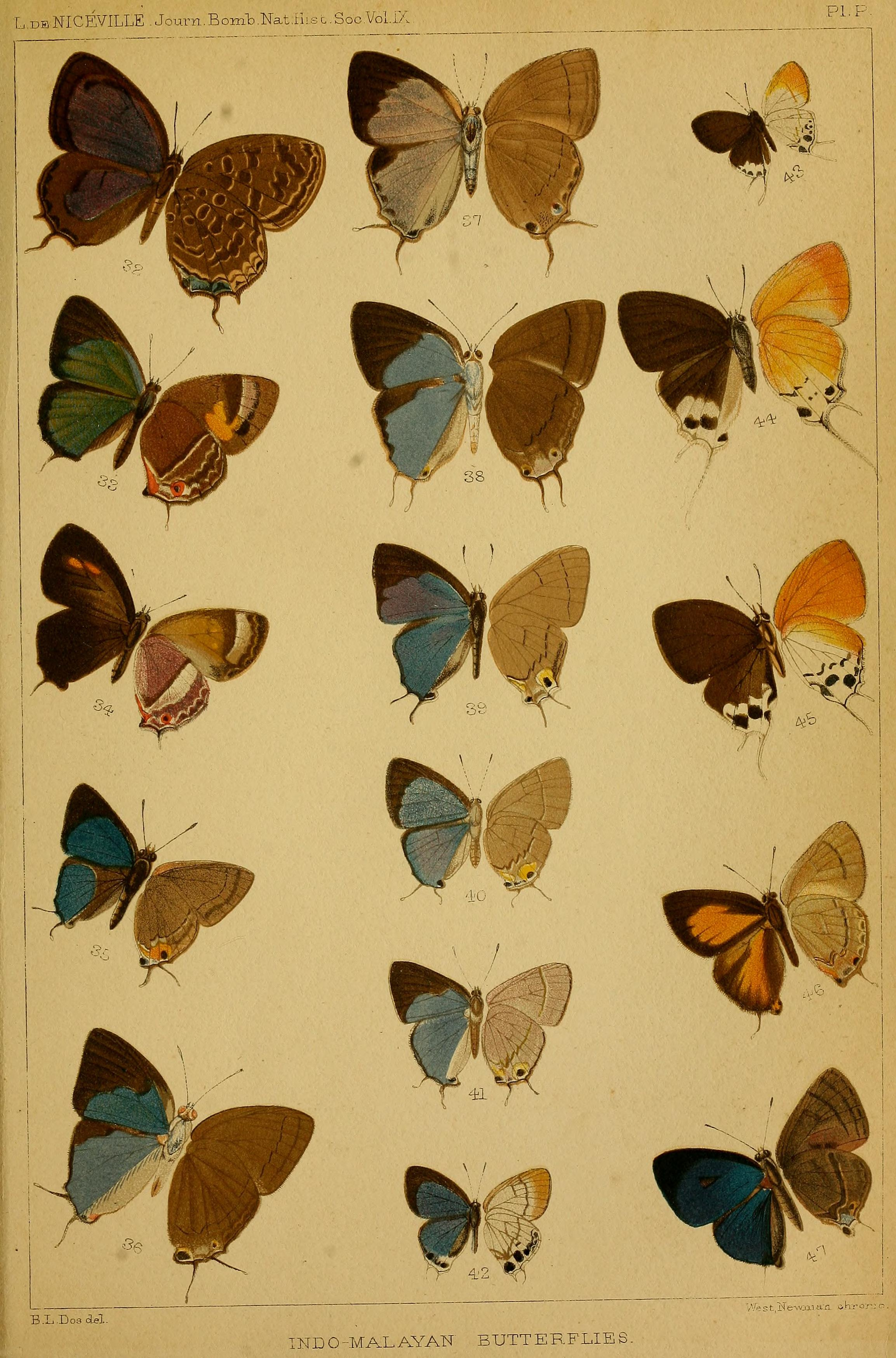
- Tajuria ogyges from original descriptions Fig. 36 Ops ogyges n sp male Fig. 37 Ops ogyges n sp female

Scientific classification
- Domain: Eukaryota
- Kingdom: Animalia
- Phylum: Arthropoda
- Class: Insecta
- Order: Lepidoptera
- Family: Lycaenidae
- Genus: Tajuria
- Species: T. ogyges

Binomial name
- Tajuria ogyges (de Nicéville, 1895)

= Tajuria ogyges =

Species of butterfly

Tajuria ogyges is a species of lycaenid or blue butterfly found in the Indomalayan realm (Burma, Thailand).
