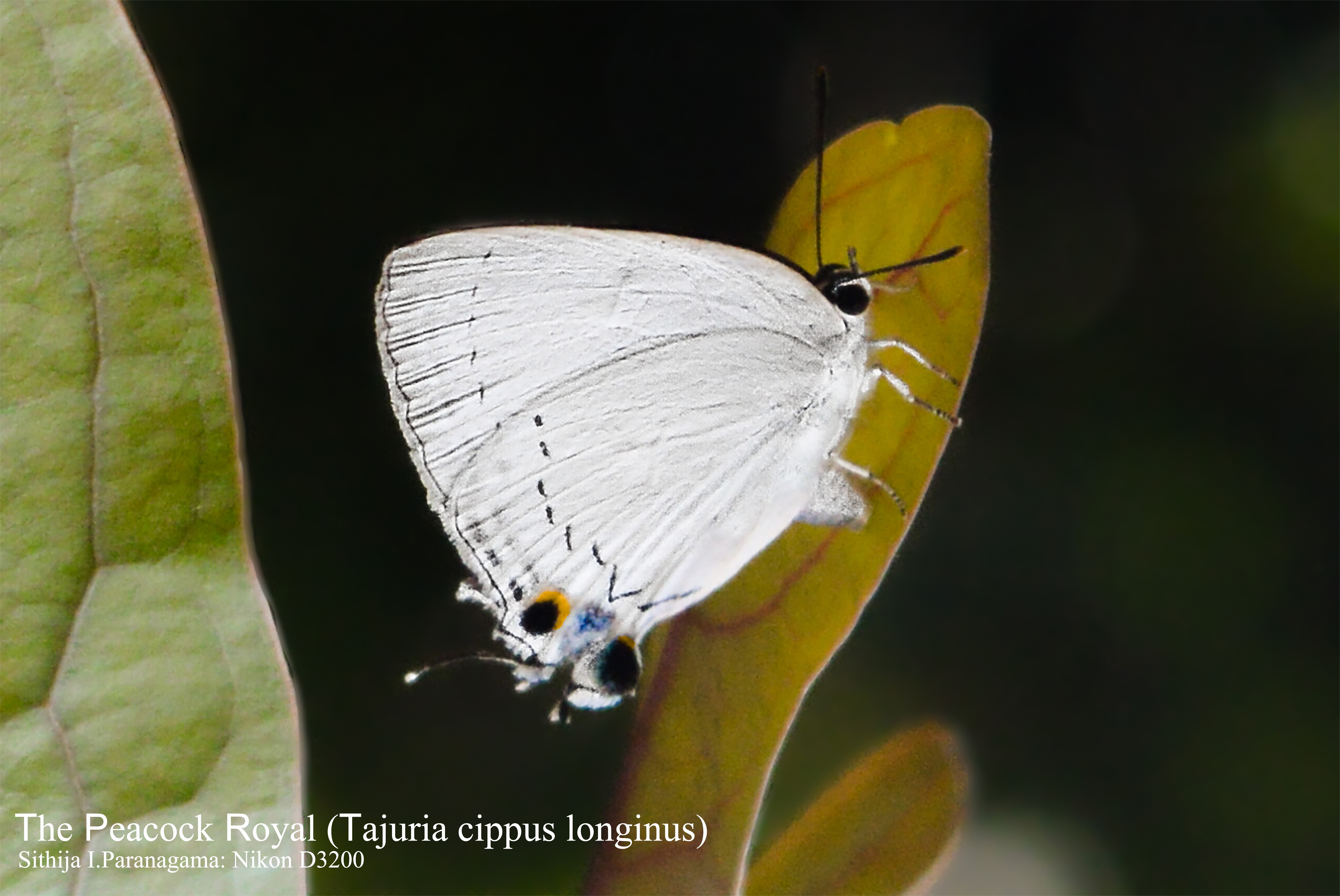
- underside

Scientific classification
- Kingdom: Animalia
- Phylum: Arthropoda
- Clade: Pancrustacea
- Class: Insecta
- Order: Lepidoptera
- Family: Lycaenidae
- Genus: Tajuria
- Species: T. cippus

Binomial name
- Tajuria cippus (Fabricius, 1798)

= Tajuria cippus =

Peacock royal

Species of butterfly

Tajuria cippus, the peacock royal, is a species of lycaenid or blue butterfly found in the Indomalayan realm.

== Description ==
Male. Upperside dark cyaneous-blue, shining blue-green in certain lights. Forewing with nearly the apical half black, a narrow black band on the costa to the end of the cell, the inner margin of the apical band then almost straight across to a little above the hinder angle, where it narrows down; the rest of the wing, including the cell, and a narrow basal streak above the sub-costal vein, blue; the median vein and the base of its branch black. Hindwing with the costal band broadly black, outer marginal line finely black, sub-costal vein black, abdominal fold blackish brown; a black spot at the anal angle with some pale bluish-white scales on it; tails black, tipped with white. Cilia of both wings black, with pale tips. Underside grey. Forewing occasionally with a diseal series of faintly indicated black thin lunules, but in most examples these are obsolete, and the wing has no visible markings whatever. Hindwing with a regular diseal series of similar marks rather closer to the margin than is usual, the upper marks forming the series more or less linear and well separated from each other, the last two are curved and turn in on to the abdominal margin a little above the anal angle, a sub-marginal pale grey band, another still paler and narrower band close to the margin; a black anal spot, with a small white spot on each side of its upper part, another and larger black spot in the first interspace, capped with orange, the space between them pale bluish-white with a few dark blue scales in it; terminal line of both wings dark brown. Antennae black, ringed with white, club with a red tip; frons white, with a black middle stripe; eyes ringed with white; head and body above and below concolorous with the wings. Female. Upperside pale greyish-blue. Forewing darker towards the base, with a few brighter blue scales; the marginal bands blackish-brown, broader on the costa, but narrower at the apex than it is in the male. Hindwing generally darker than the forewing, the bands paler, the costal band broader than it is in the male, its lower part darker than its upper, outer marginal band broader and macular, a rather prominent discal band of somewhat lunular marks, evenly curved, but the marks placed in echelon with each other. Underside as in the male, but the discal series on both wings nearly always present.

— Charles Swinhoe, Lepidoptera Indica. Vol. IX

== Sri Lanka ==
In Sri lanka these species are sometimes rare, because of the deforestation in some parts of the country.

== Subspecies ==
- T. c. cippus North Pakistan, Assam to Thailand
- T. c. longinus (Fabricius, 1798) Ceylon, South India
- T. c. maxentius Fruhstorfer, 1912 Langkawi, Peninsular Malaya, Singapore
- T. c. pseudolonginus (Doubleday, 1847) Java
- T. c. theodosius Fruhstorfer, 1912 Bawean
- T. c. frontinus Fruhstorfer, 1912 Lombok
- T. c. bagus (Kheil, 1884) Nias
- T. c. malcolmi Riley & Godfrey Hainan

== Gallery ==
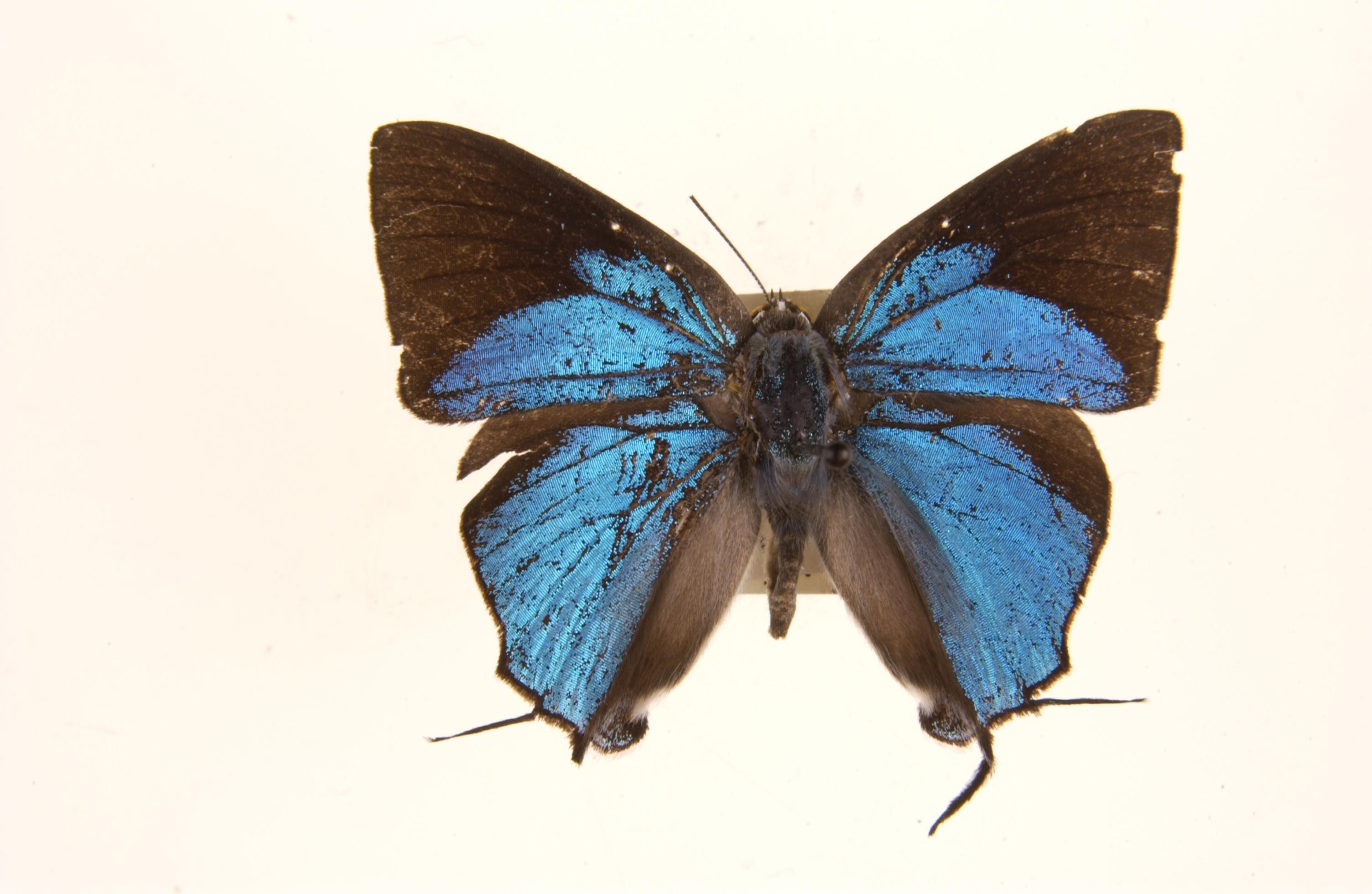
Male

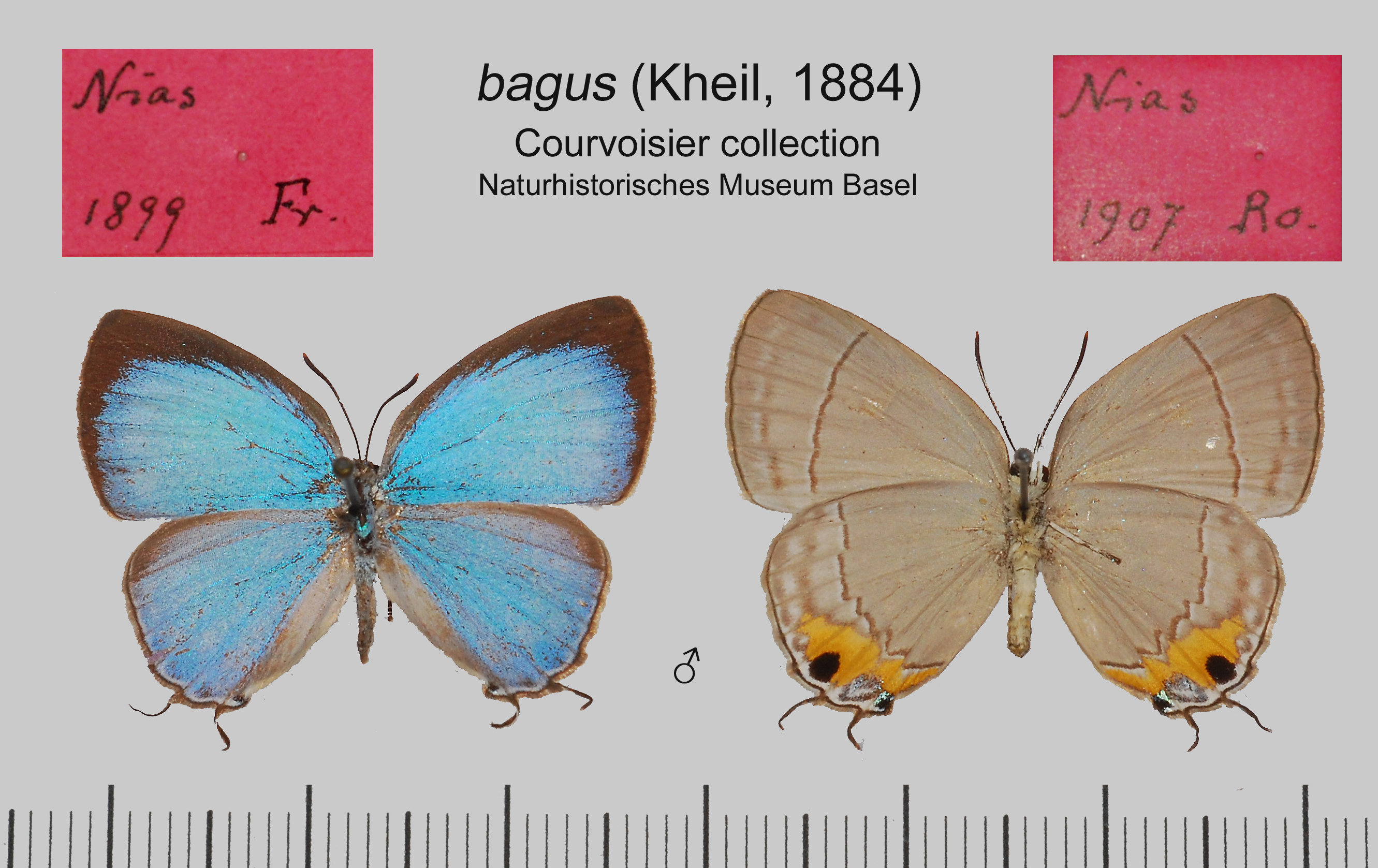
Museum specimen

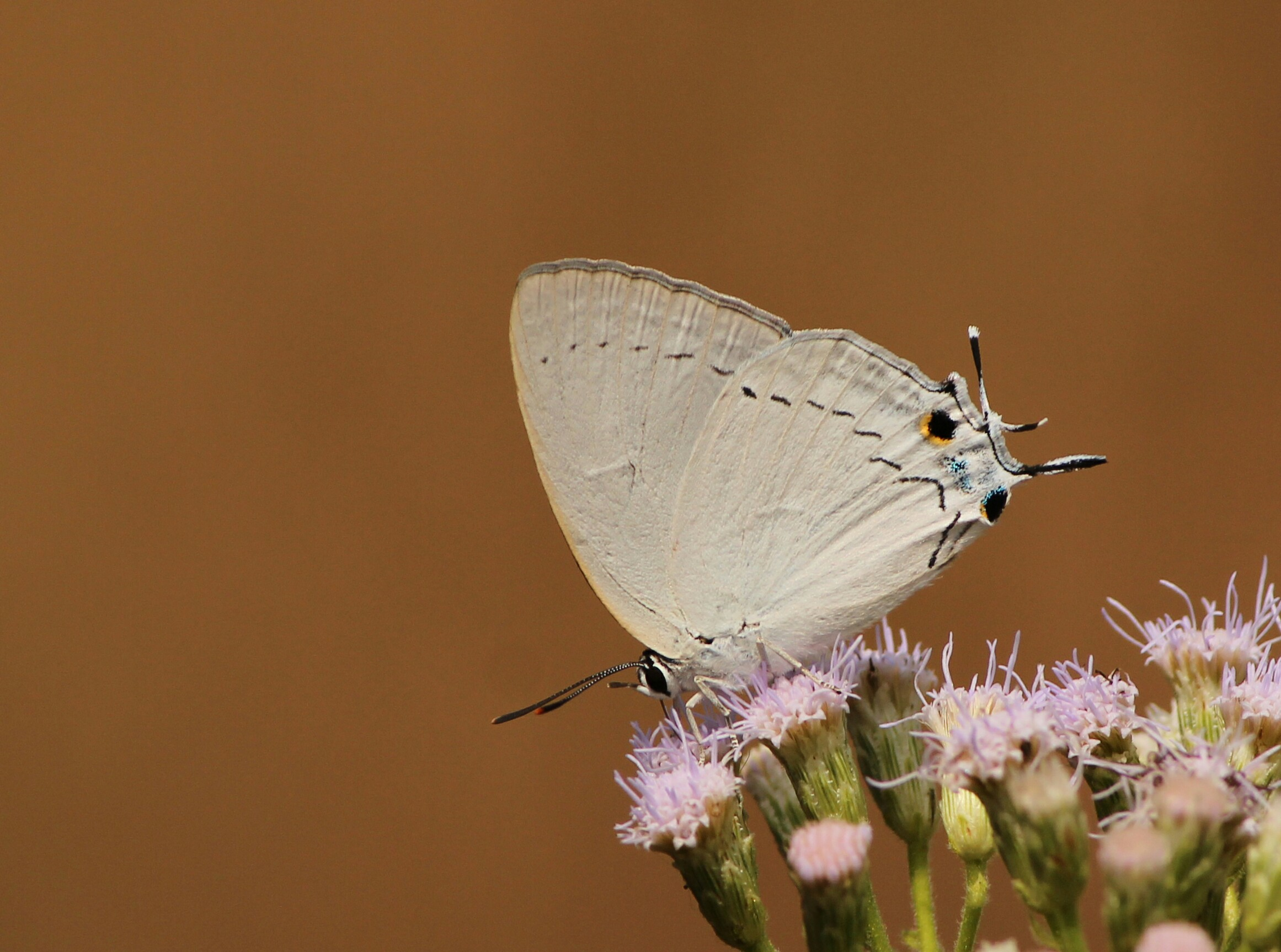
Ventral view

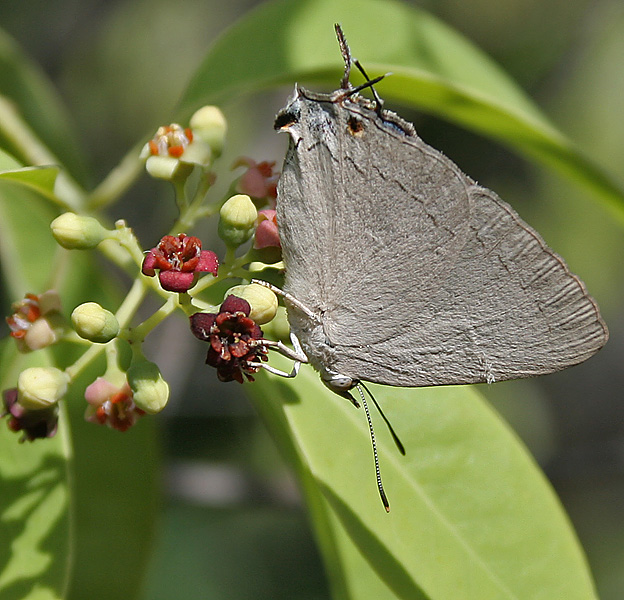
On Santalum album (chandan) in Hyderabad, India

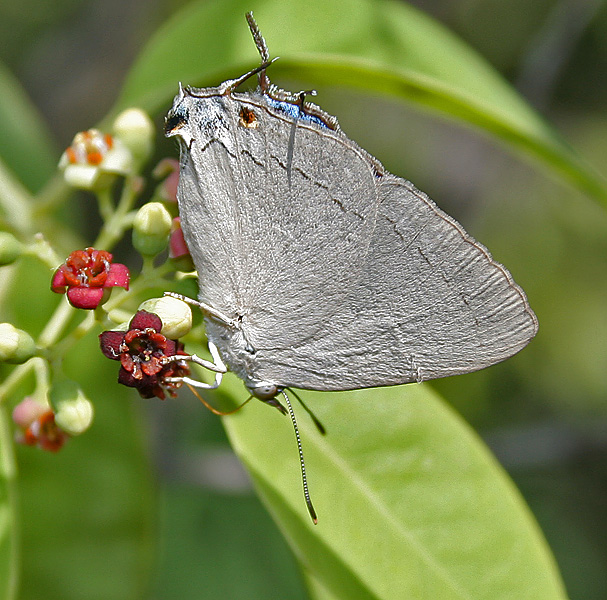
On Santalum album in Hyderabad

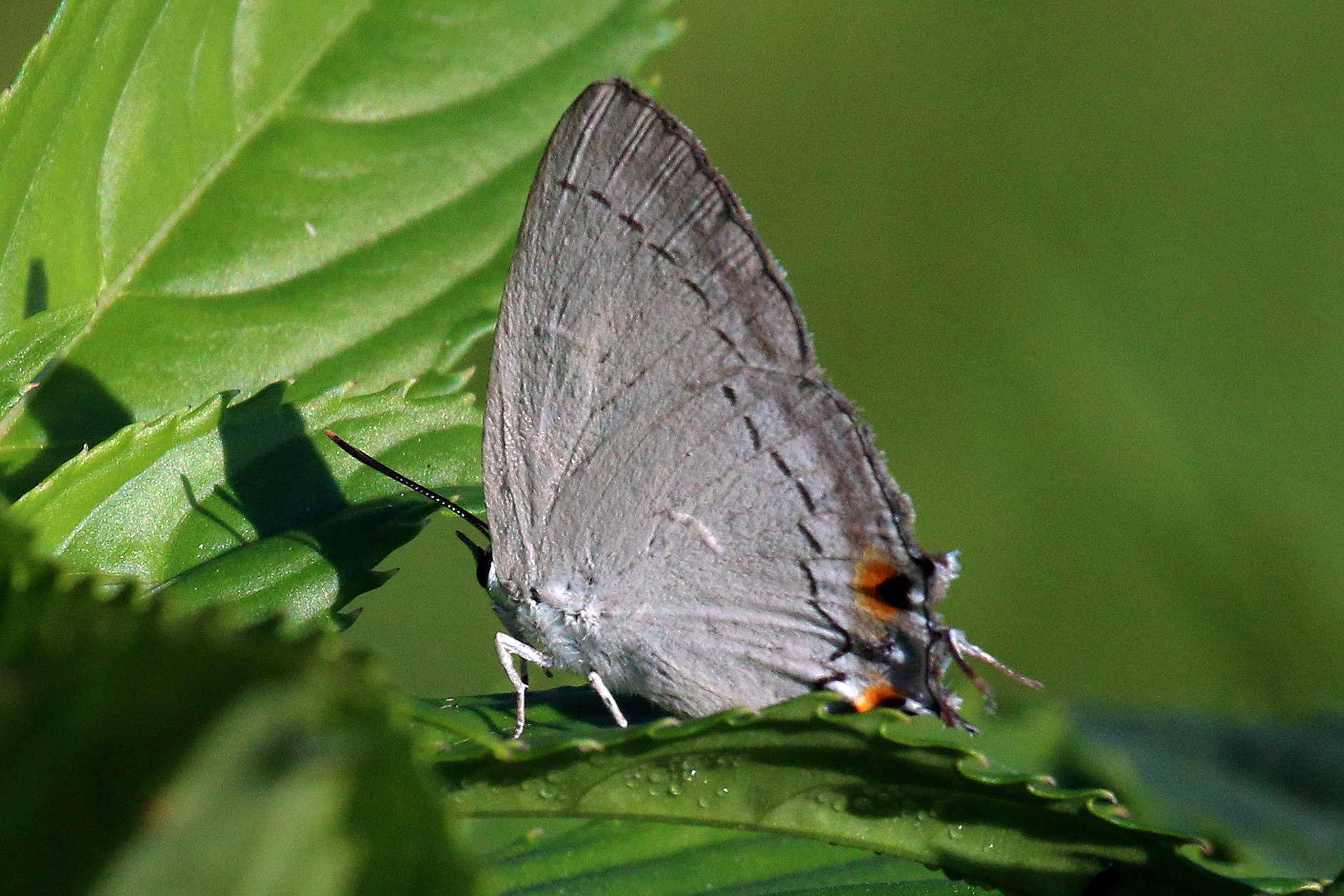
T. c. frontinus, Bali
