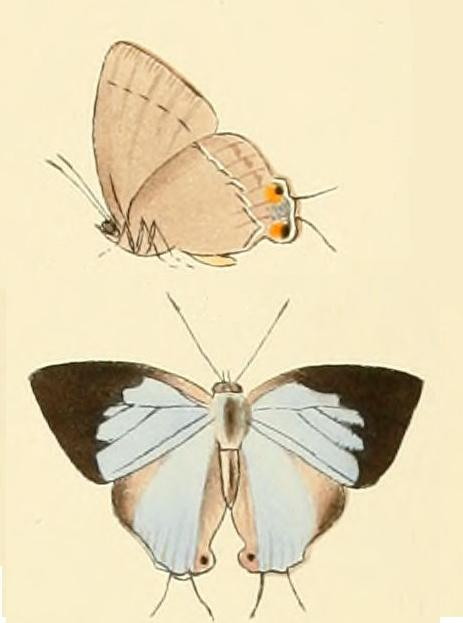

Scientific classification
- Kingdom: Animalia
- Phylum: Arthropoda
- Class: Insecta
- Order: Lepidoptera
- Family: Lycaenidae
- Genus: Tajuria
- Species: T. ister

Binomial name
- Tajuria ister (Hewitson, 1865)

Synonyms
- Iolaus ister Hewitson, 1865; Ancema ister; Tajuria tussis Druce, 1895

= Tajuria ister =

Species of butterfly

Tajuria ister, the uncertain royal, is a butterfly in the family Lycaenidae. It is found in Asia.

== Subspecies ==
- Tajuria ister ister (Assam, Burma, possibly Thailand)
- Tajuria ister tussis Druce, 1895 (Peninsular Malaya, Borneo, possibly Sumatra)
