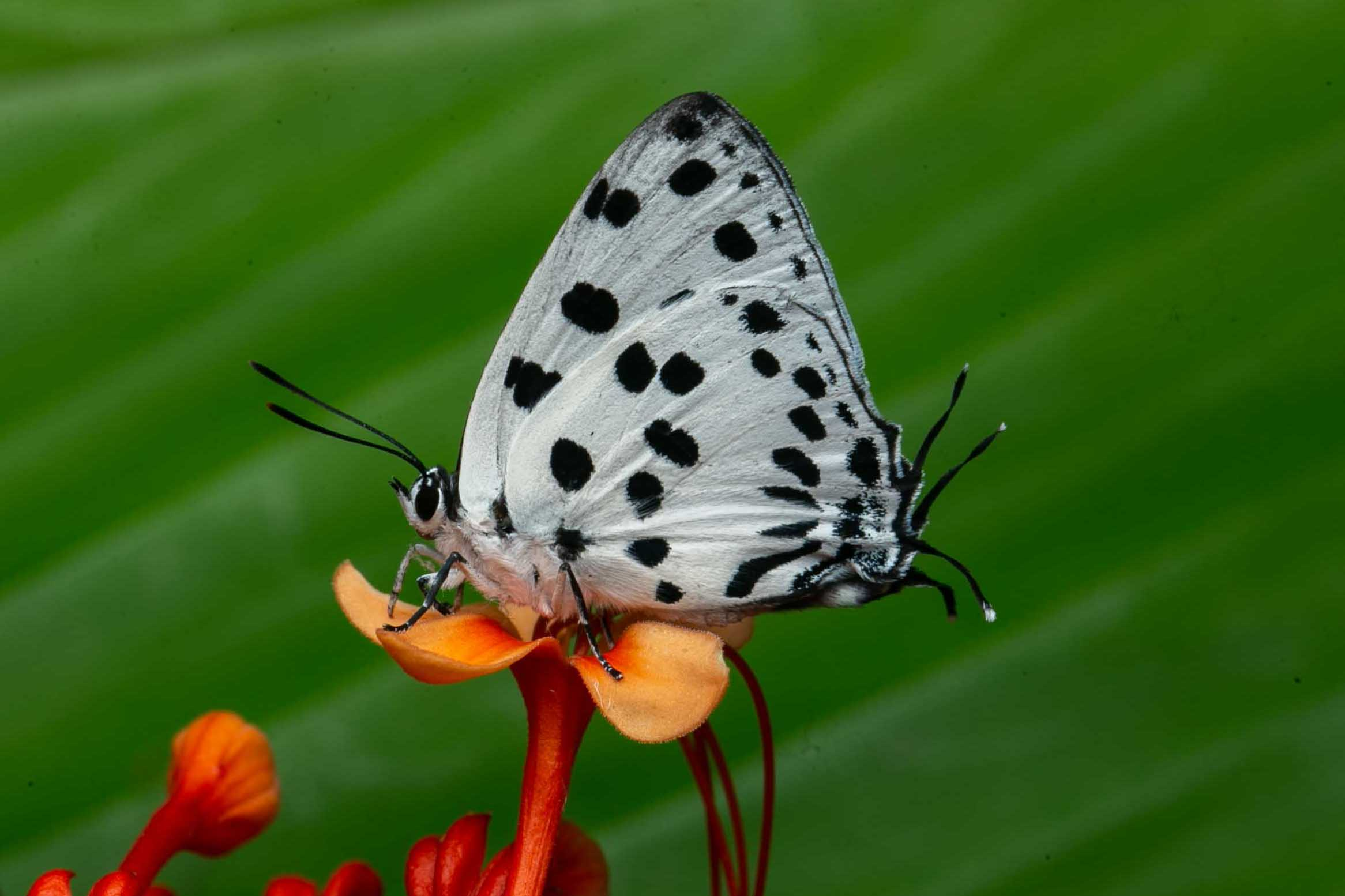

Scientific classification
- Kingdom: Animalia
- Phylum: Arthropoda
- Clade: Pancrustacea
- Class: Insecta
- Order: Lepidoptera
- Family: Lycaenidae
- Genus: Tajuria
- Species: T. maculata

Binomial name
- Tajuria maculata (Hewitson, 1865)

Synonyms
- Iolaus maculatus; Tajuria maculatus

= Tajuria maculata =

Spotted royal

Species of butterfly

Tajuria maculata, the spotted royal, is a species of lycaenid or blue butterfly found in Asia.

== Distribution ==
Initially thought to be occurring in Sikkim to Peninsular Malaya, Borneo, Sumatra. Though there was a single specimen record of T. maculata from south India with the de Nicéville collection, that Stokes Roberts took from the Nilgiris district, northwestern Tamil Nadu, southern Western Ghats (Yates 1935), it was confirmed only in 2011 by V.K. Sarkar et al. This rare butterfly was sighted again in the Nilgiris nearly a century over.

In May 2013, naturalists found eggs and caterpillars of this butterfly in Lakkidy, Wayanad, Keralam. They successfully recorded the complete lifecycle, the first time in India.

== Description ==
In 1865, William Chapman Hewitson described this butterfly as:

Upperside. Female. Anterior wing dark brown, with a large central spot of white from the base to beyond the middle, with its base and a spot at its middle lilac. Posterior wing with the costal margin, a submarginal band of spots, a spot above these, and the outer margin dark brown : a submarginal line of white and some lilac spots.

Underside white, with numerous black spots.

— William Chapman Hewitson

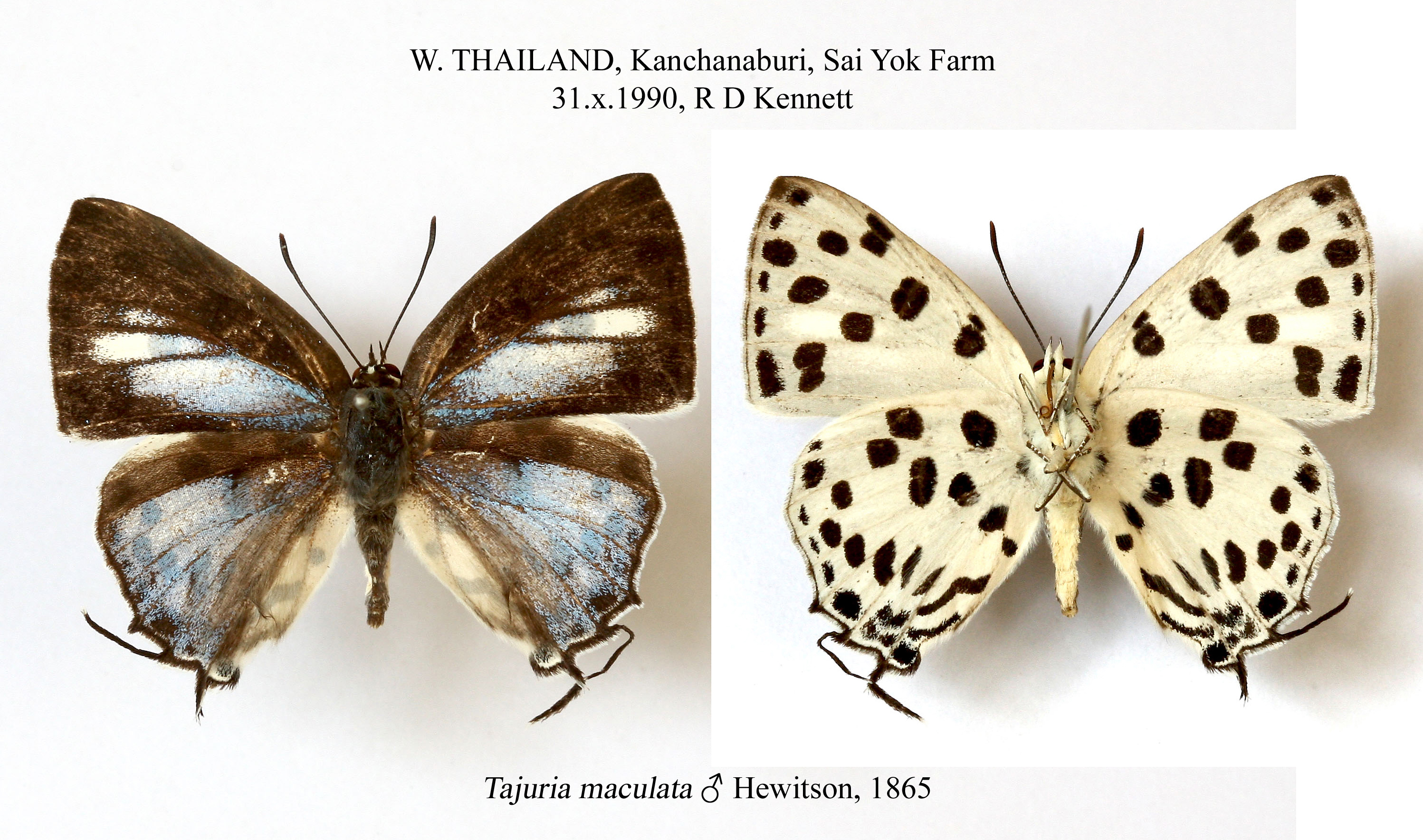

== Life history ==
The larvae feed on Dendrophthoe spp., Loranthus spp. and Viscum spp.

== See also ==
- List of butterflies of India (Lycaenidae)
