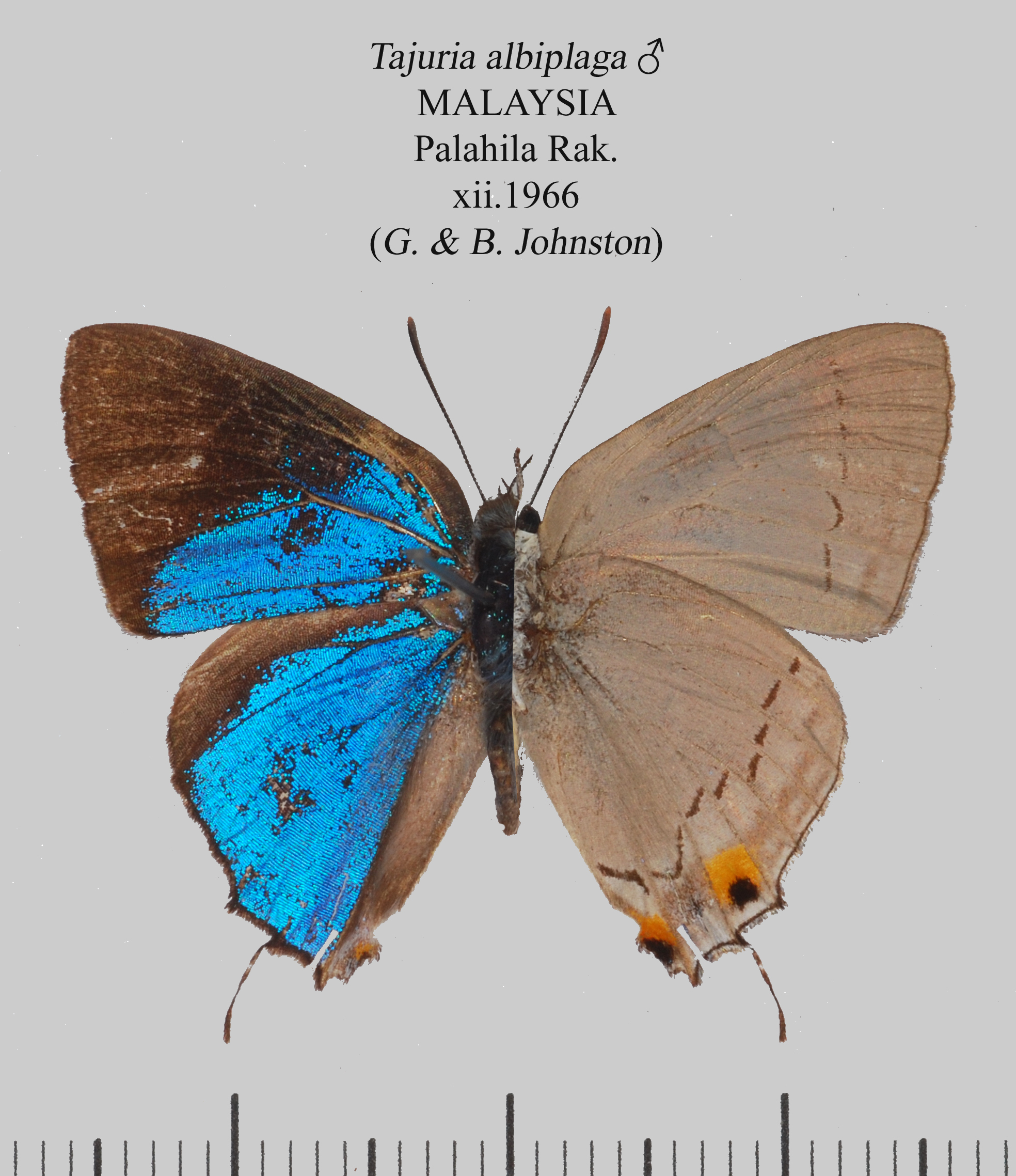

Scientific classification
- Kingdom: Animalia
- Phylum: Arthropoda
- Clade: Pancrustacea
- Class: Insecta
- Order: Lepidoptera
- Family: Lycaenidae
- Genus: Tajuria
- Species: T. albiplaga

Binomial name
- Tajuria albiplaga de Niceville, 1887

= Tajuria albiplaga =

Pallid royal

Species of butterfly

Tajuria albiplaga, the pallid royal, is a species of lycaenid or blue butterfly found in the Indomalayan realm.

== Subspecies ==
- T. a. albiplaga Sikkim, Assam
- T. a. pallescens Druce, [1903] Assam, Burma, Thailand
- T. a. alixae Eliot, 1973 Peninsular Malaya
- T. a. tura de Nicéville, 1895 Java, Sumatra
