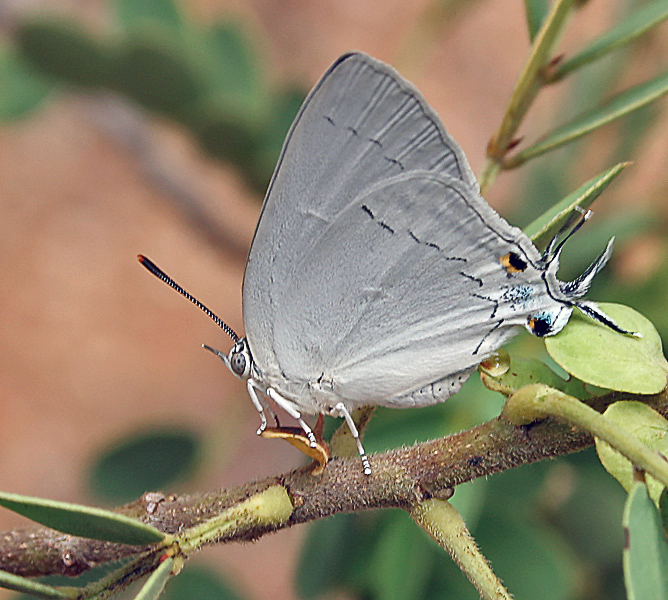
- Peacock royal (Tajuria cippus)

Scientific classification
- Kingdom: Animalia
- Phylum: Arthropoda
- Clade: Pancrustacea
- Class: Insecta
- Order: Lepidoptera
- Family: Lycaenidae
- Subfamily: Theclinae
- Tribe: Theclini
- Genus: Tajuria; Moore, [1881]

Synonyms
- Ops de Nicéville, 1895; Cophanta Moore, 1884; Remelana Distant, 1884 (nec Moore, 1884); Creusa de Nicéville, [1896]

= Tajuria =

Butterfly genus in family Lycaenidae

Tajuria is an Indomalayan genus of butterflies in the family Lycaenidae.

== Species ==
- Tajuria alangani Schröder, Treadaway & Nuyda, 1993 Philippines
- Tajuria albiplaga de Nicéville, 1887
- Tajuria androconia Z.G. Wang & Y. Niu, 2002
- Tajuria arida Riley, 1923
- Tajuria berenis Druce, 1896
- Tajuria cippus (Fabricius, 1798)
- Tajuria caelurea Nire, 1926
- Tajuria culta (de Nicéville, [1896])
- Tajuria cyrillus (Hewitson, 1865)
- Tajuria deudorix (Hewitson, 1869)
- Tajuria diaeus (Hewitson, 1865)
- Tajuria discalis Fruhstorfer, 1897
- Tajuria dominus Druce, 1895
- Tajuria gui Chou & Wang, 1994 China
- Tajuria iapyx (Hewitson, 1865)
- Tajuria igolotiana (Murayama & Okamura, 1973) Philippines
- Tajuria illurgioides de Nicéville, 1890 North India, Assam, Sikkim
- Tajuria illurgis (Hewitson, 1869)
- Tajuria inexpectata Eliot, 1973 Sumatra, Borneo, Peninsular Malaya
- Tajuria isaeus (Hewitson, 1865)
- Tajuria ister (Hewitson, 1865)
- Tajuria jalajala (C. & R. Felder, 1865)
- Tajuria jehana Moore, [1884]
- Tajuria luculentus (Leech, 1890)
- Tajuria lucullus Druce, 1904 Borneo
- Tajuria maculata (Hewitson, 1865)
- Tajuria mantra (C. & R. Felder, 1860)
- Tajuria matsutaroi Hayashi, 1984
- Tajuria megistia (Hewitson, 1869)
- Tajuria melastigma de Nicéville, 1887
- Tajuria mizunumai H. Hayashi, 1978
- Tajuria ogyges (de Nicéville, 1895)
- Tajuria sebonga Tytler, 1915 Manipur
- Tajuria sunia Moulton, 1911 Peninsular Malaya
- Tajuria yajna (Doherty, 1886)
