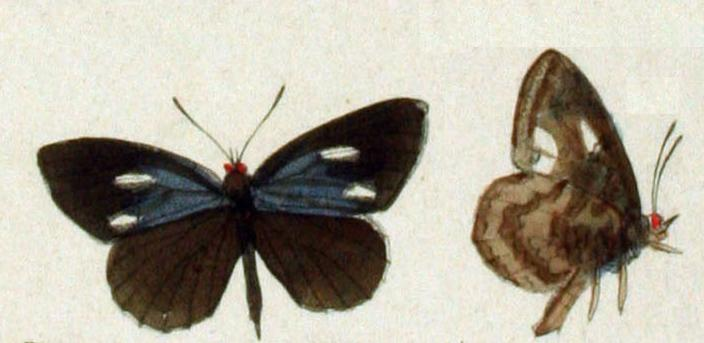

Scientific classification
- Kingdom: Animalia
- Phylum: Arthropoda
- Clade: Pancrustacea
- Class: Insecta
- Order: Lepidoptera
- Family: Lycaenidae
- Genus: Miletus
- Species: M. melanion

Binomial name
- Miletus melanion C. Felder & R. Felder, 1865

Synonyms
- Gerydus melanion; Gerydus melanion melanion; Gerydus melanion euphranor Fruhstorfer, 1914

= Miletus melanion =

Species of butterfly

Miletus melanion is a butterfly in the family Lycaenidae. It is found on the Philippines. Above very much like Allotinus horsfieldi, but with a whitish instead of grey androconial spot. Between the posterior median and the submedian there is a submarginal white stripe embedded. The female resembles some G. leos-races by the distribution of spots on the upper surface of the forewings, but the contour of the hindwing is more obtuse. The under surface reminds us of G. symethus, but it is throughout darker grey. The clasping-organs are sharply separated from G. symethus and G. leos. The uncus has stouter, shorter and broader sheets, and as a chief characteristic remarkably short and at the same time stronger, small ventral hooks than any other Gerydinae having been examined hitherto. The valve resembles that of G. leos, being beneath roundish without a delimited apex, Beside the androconial spot the forewing a short whitish stripe above the submedian.

== Subspecies ==
- Miletus melanion melanion (Philippines)
- Miletus melanion euphranor (Fruhstorfer, 1914) (Philippines: Mindoro)
