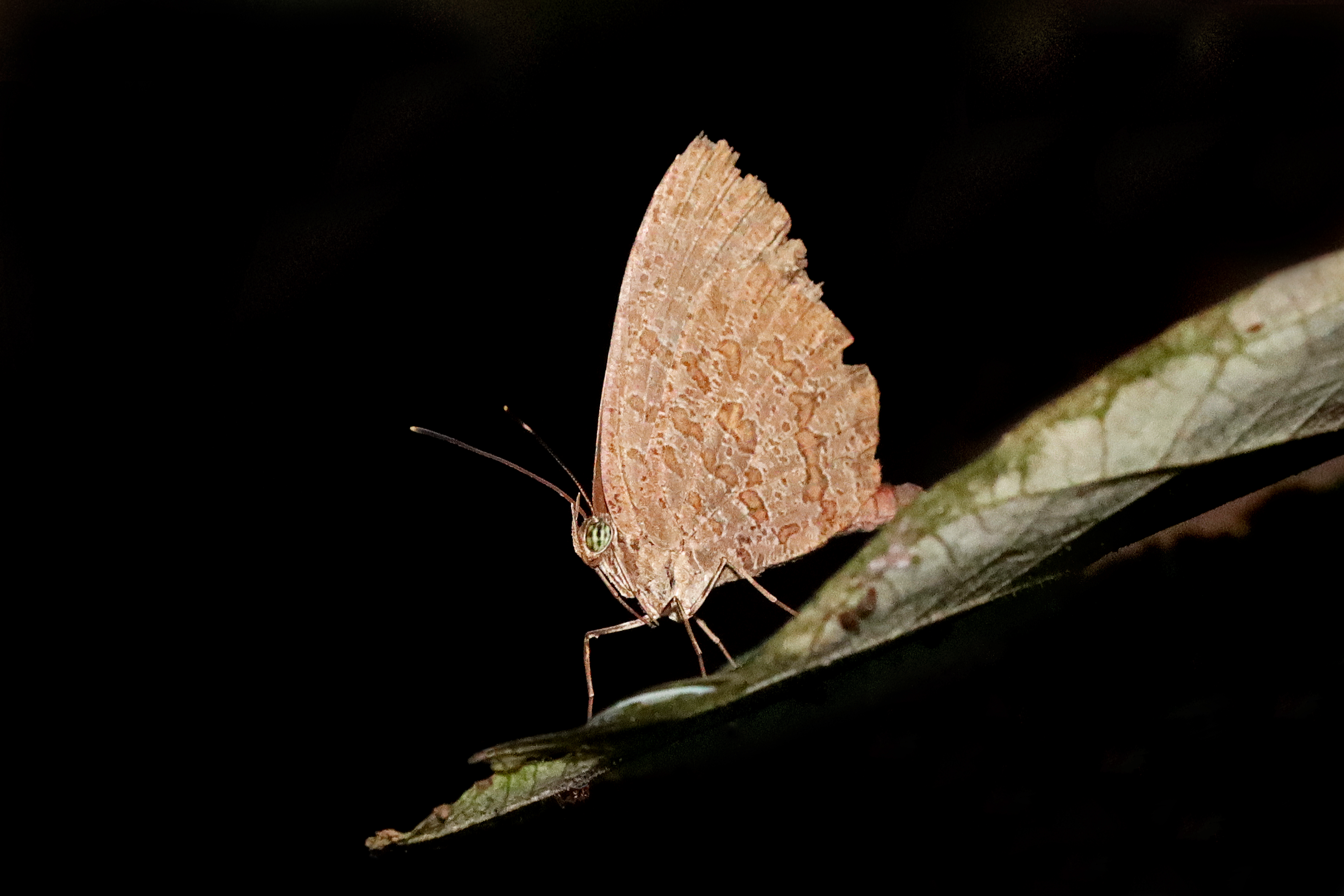

Scientific classification
- Kingdom: Animalia
- Phylum: Arthropoda
- Class: Insecta
- Order: Lepidoptera
- Family: Lycaenidae
- Genus: Miletus
- Species: M. chinensis
- Subspecies: M. c. longeana

Trinomial name
- Miletus chinensis longeana (de Nicéville, 1898)

= Miletus chinensis longeana =

Subspecies of butterfly

Miletus chinensis longeana, or Long's brownie, is a small subspecies of butterfly found in India and Myanmar that belongs to the lycaenids or blues family.

== Range ==
It ranges from Manipur in India to Myanmar.

== Status ==
This subspecies is reported as not being rare by William Harry Evans and as rare as per Mark Alexander Wynter-Blyth.

== Description ==
A small butterfly, 30 to 38 mm in wingspan. The upper forewing in both sexes has a prominent curved white discal band; the lower spots composing it are separate and sometimes coalesced in female. The apical area of the upper forewing is darker than the basal area. The dry-season form of the butterfly is white above except for the apex and a discal brown patch of the forewing and the costa on the hindwing.

== Taxonomy ==
The butterfly was earlier known as Gerydus longeana de Nicéville. It was formerly treated as a species, but is now regarded as a subspecies of Miletus chinensis.
