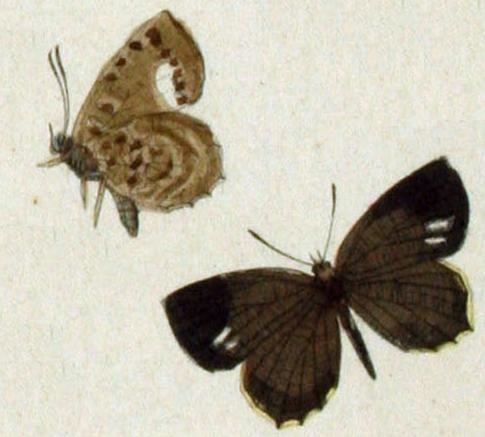

Scientific classification
- Kingdom: Animalia
- Phylum: Arthropoda
- Clade: Pancrustacea
- Class: Insecta
- Order: Lepidoptera
- Family: Lycaenidae
- Genus: Miletus
- Species: M. chinensis

Binomial name
- Miletus chinensis C. Felder, 1862

Synonyms
- Gerydus irroratus var. assamensis Doherty, 1891 (wet-season form); Gerydus boisduvali milvius Fruhstorfer, 1913; Miletus learchus C. & R. Felder, 1865 (wet-season form); Miletus irroratus H. Druce, 1874; Miletus archilochus kelantanus Corbet, 1938; Gerydus longeana de Nicéville, 1898; Miletus chinensis longeana Eliot, 1961

= Miletus chinensis =

Species of butterfly

Miletus chinensis, the common brownie, is a butterfly in the family Lycaenidae. It is found in South Asia (Indomalayan realm)

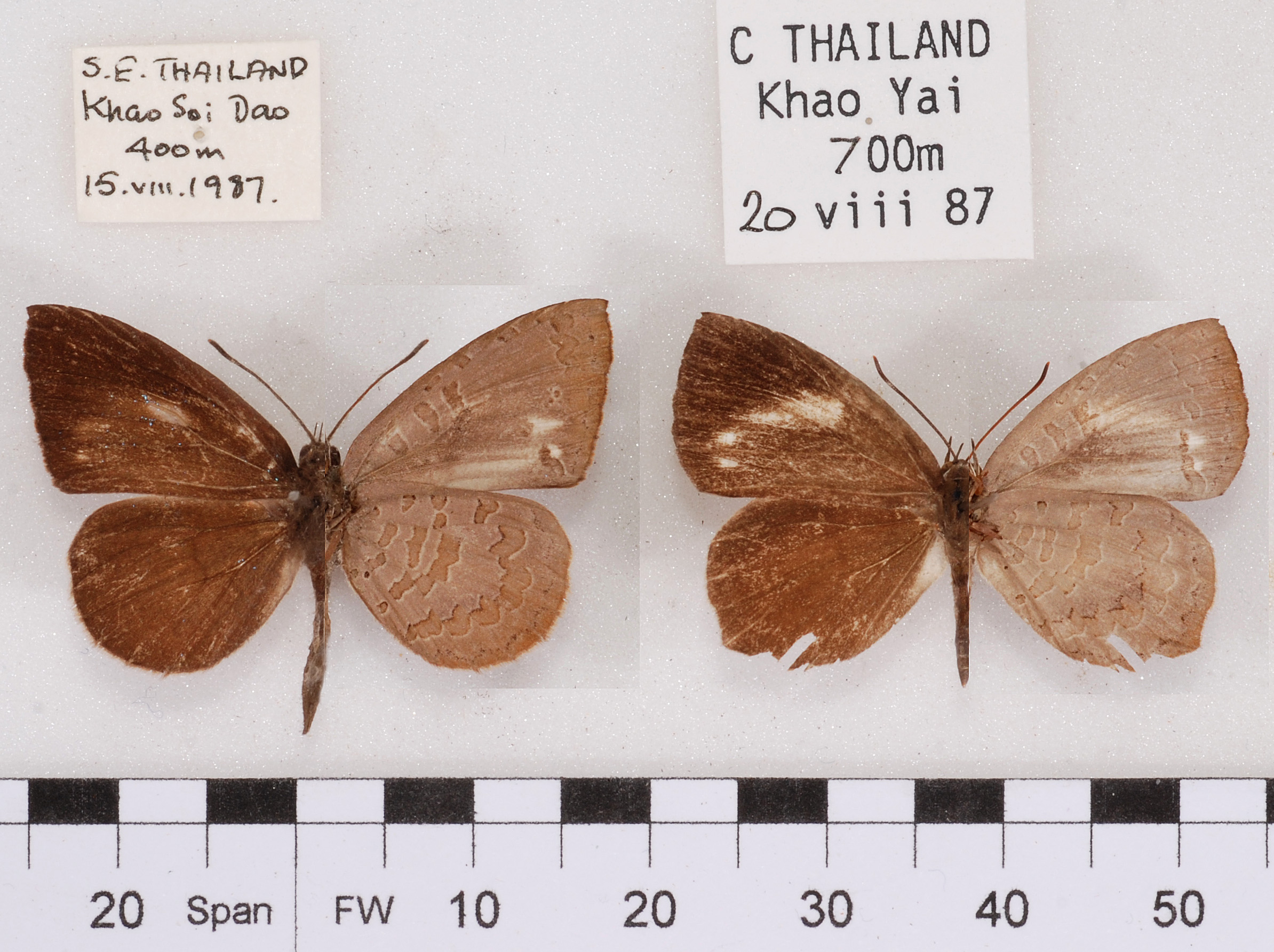
M. c. learchus

== Subspecies ==
- Miletus chinensis chinensis (Yunnan to south-eastern China and Hainan)
- Miletus chinensis assamensis (Doherty, 1891) (Kumaon to Assam and Sikkim)
- Miletus chinensis learchus C. Felder & R. Felder, 1865 (Indo-China, Thailand, Burma, northern Malaya)
- Miletus chinensis longeana (de Nicéville, 1898) (Manipur, Burma) — Long's brownie
