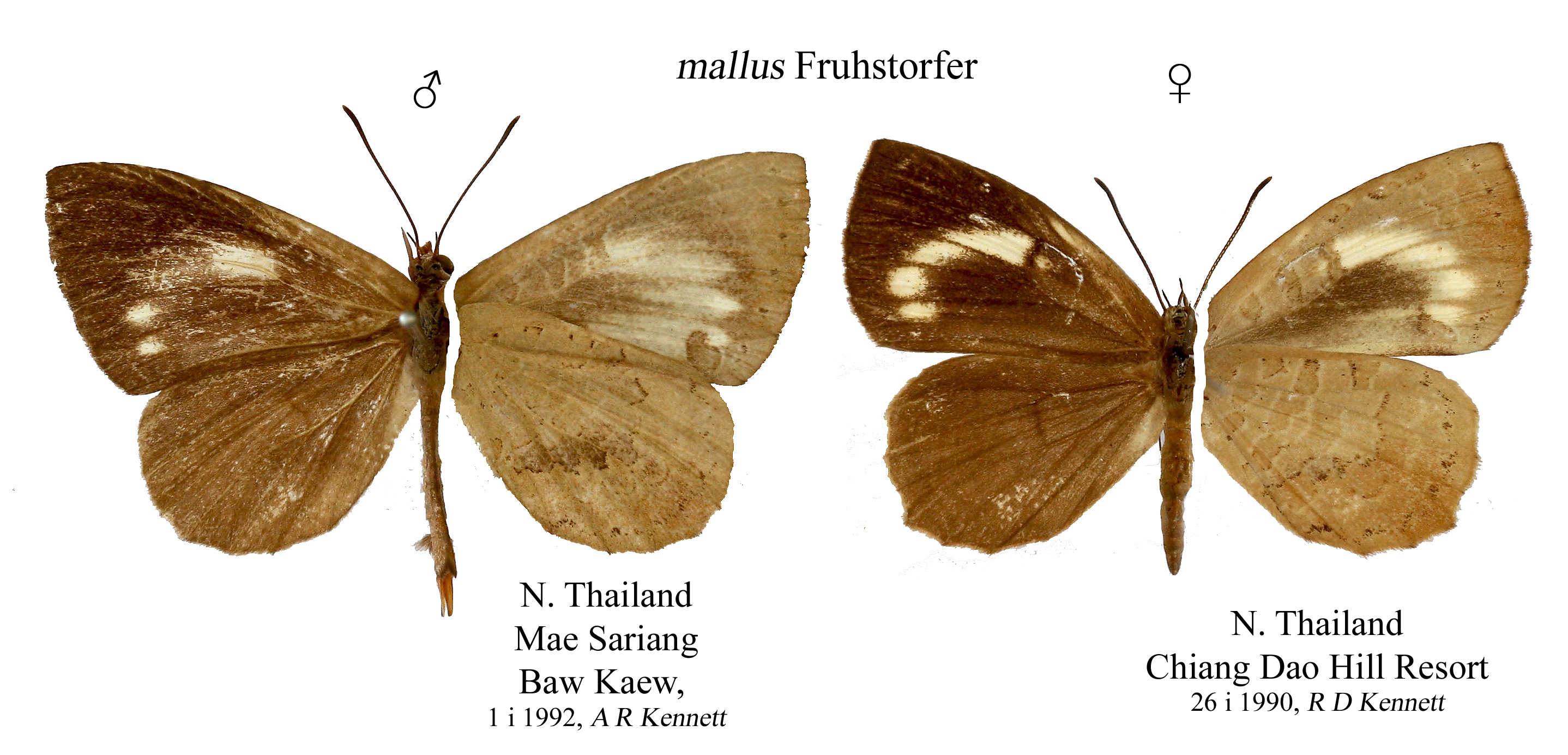

Scientific classification
- Kingdom: Animalia
- Phylum: Arthropoda
- Class: Insecta
- Order: Lepidoptera
- Family: Lycaenidae
- Genus: Miletus
- Species: M. mallus

Binomial name
- Miletus mallus (Fruhstorfer, 1913)

Synonyms
- Gerydus croton mallus Fruhstorfer, 1913; Gerydus gethusus Fruhstorfer, 1915; Gerydus gethusus shania Evans, 1932

= Miletus mallus =

Species of butterfly

Miletus mallus is a butterfly in the family Lycaenidae. It is found in Asia.

== Subspecies ==
- Miletus mallus mallus (Burma, Thailand, Laos, southern Vietnam)
- Miletus mallus gethusus (Fruhstorfer, 1915) (southern Yunnan, northern Vietnam)
- Miletus mallus shania (Evans, 1932) (Burma)
