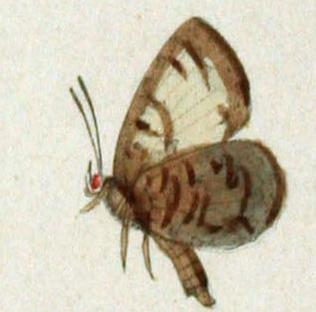

Scientific classification
- Kingdom: Animalia
- Phylum: Arthropoda
- Class: Insecta
- Order: Lepidoptera
- Family: Lycaenidae
- Genus: Miletus
- Species: M. zinckenii

Binomial name
- Miletus zinckenii C. Felder & R. Felder, 1865

Synonyms
- Gerydus improbus H. H. Druce, 1896

= Miletus zinckenii =

Species of butterfly

Miletus zinckenii is a butterfly in the family Lycaenidae. It is found on Java and Borneo.

== Subspecies ==
- Miletus zinckenii zinckenii (Java)
- Miletus zinckenii improbus (H. H. Druce, 1896) (Borneo)
