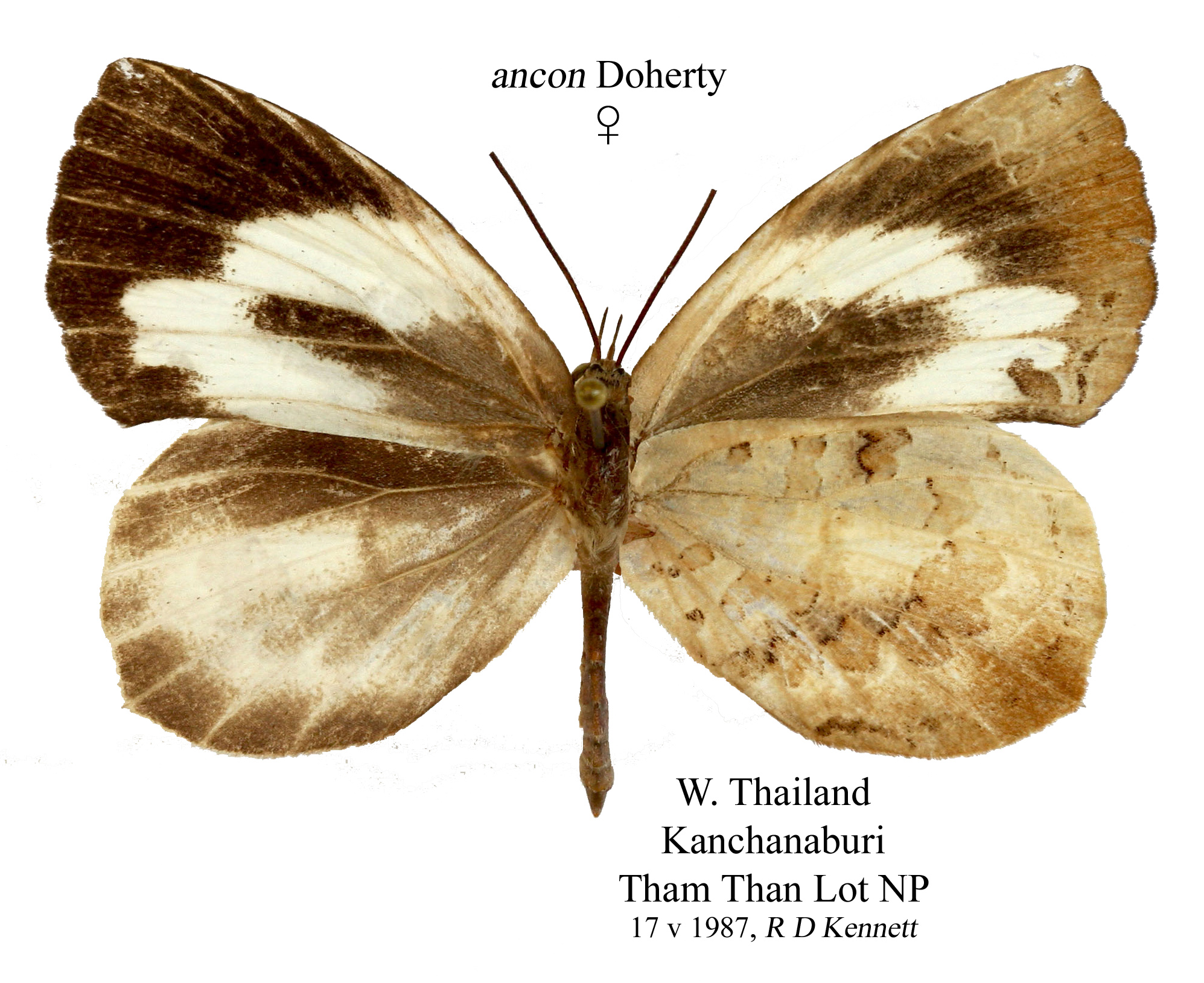

Scientific classification
- Kingdom: Animalia
- Phylum: Arthropoda
- Clade: Pancrustacea
- Class: Insecta
- Order: Lepidoptera
- Family: Lycaenidae
- Genus: Miletus
- Species: M. ancon

Binomial name
- Miletus ancon (Doherty, 1889)

Synonyms
- Gerydus ancon Doherty, 1889; Gerydus gigas H. H. Druce, 1895; Gerydus ancon anconides Fruhstorfer, 1913

= Miletus ancon =

Species of butterfly

Miletus ancon is a butterfly in the family Lycaenidae. It is found in Southeast Asia.

== Subspecies ==
- Miletus ancon ancon (Burma: Shan States, Karen Hills, Tavoy)
- Miletus ancon gigas (H. H. Druce, 1895) (Borneo)
