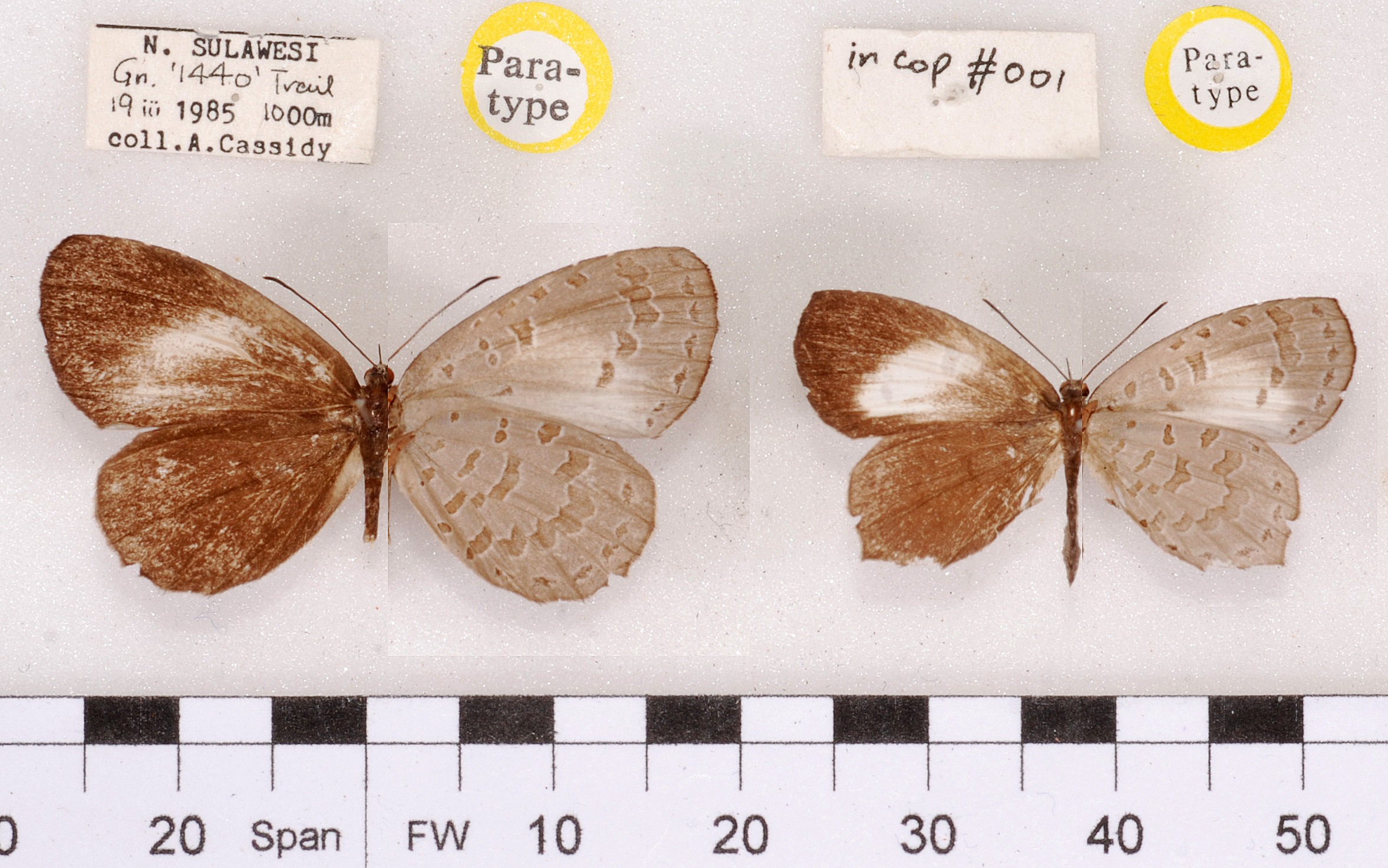

Scientific classification
- Kingdom: Animalia
- Phylum: Arthropoda
- Class: Insecta
- Order: Lepidoptera
- Family: Lycaenidae
- Genus: Miletus
- Species: M. rosei

Binomial name
- Miletus rosei Cassidy, 1995

= Miletus rosei =

Species of butterfly

Miletus rosei is a butterfly in the family Lycaenidae. It is found in northern Sulawesi.
