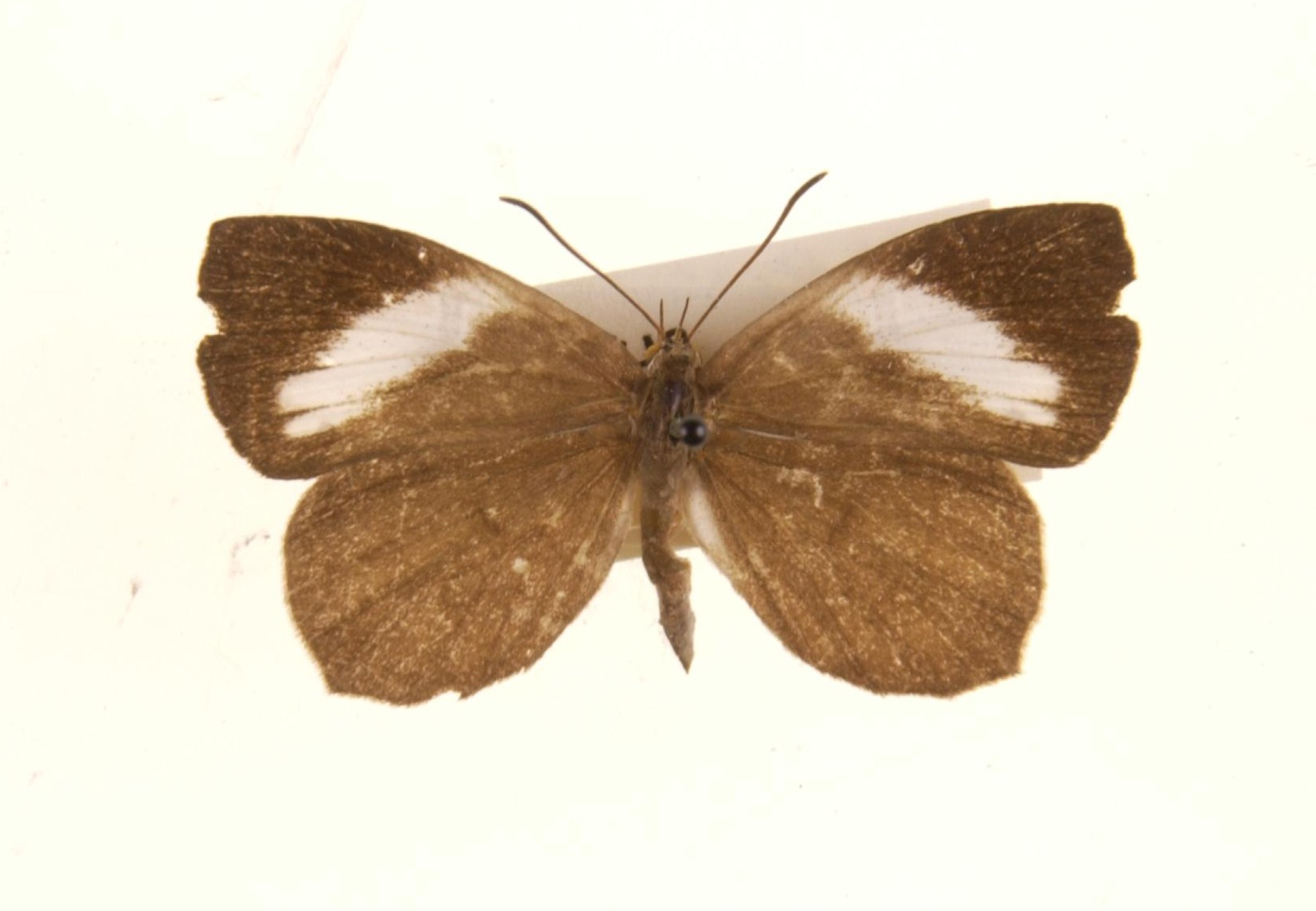
- Museum specimen from Malaya

Scientific classification
- Kingdom: Animalia
- Phylum: Arthropoda
- Class: Insecta
- Order: Lepidoptera
- Family: Lycaenidae
- Genus: Miletus
- Species: M. biggsii

Binomial name
- Miletus biggsii (Distant, 1884)

Synonyms
- Gerydus biggsii Distant, 1884; Gerydus boisduvali albotignula van Eecke, 1914; Gerydus boisduvali simalurensis Toxopeus, 1928; Gerydus boisduvali xeragis Fruhstorfer, 1916; Gerydus boisduvali hyllus Fruhstorfer, 1916; Gerydus biggsii sebethus Fruhstorfer, 1916; Gerydus biggsii extraneus Toxopeus, 1929; Gerydus biggsii natunensis Fruhstorfer, 1916; Gerydus biggsii niasicus Fruhstorfer, 1913; Gerydus biggsii batunensis Fruhstorfer, 1913

= Miletus biggsii =

Species of butterfly

Miletus biggsii, the Bigg's brownie, is a small butterfly found in India and Myanmar that belongs to the lycaenids or blues family.

== Range ==
It is found in Kodagu (Coorg) in India, Myanmar, Thailand, Langkawi, Malaya, Tioman, Singapore, Borneo, Sumatra, Belitung and Weh.

== Status ==
It is very rare in Kodagu (a single record) and rare in Myanmar as per Mark Alexander Wynter-Blyth.

== Description ==
A small butterfly, 32 to 38 mm in wingspan. The upper forewing in both sexes has a broad white discal band which is straight, coalesced and comprises at least one-fourth of the wing.

== Taxonomy ==
The butterfly was earlier known as Gerydus biggsii Distant. Eliot provisionally placed the single specimen from Kodagu in Miletus nymphis.

== Subspecies ==
- Miletus biggsii biggsii (southern Burma, Thailand, Langkawi, Malay Peninsula, Tioman, Singapore, Borneo, Sumatra, Belitung, Weh)
- Miletus biggsii albotignula (van Eecke, 1914) (Simalur)
- Miletus biggsii natunensis (Fruhstorfer, 1916) (Natuna Islands)
- Miletus biggsii niasicus (Fruhstorfer, 1913) (Nias Island, Batu Island)
