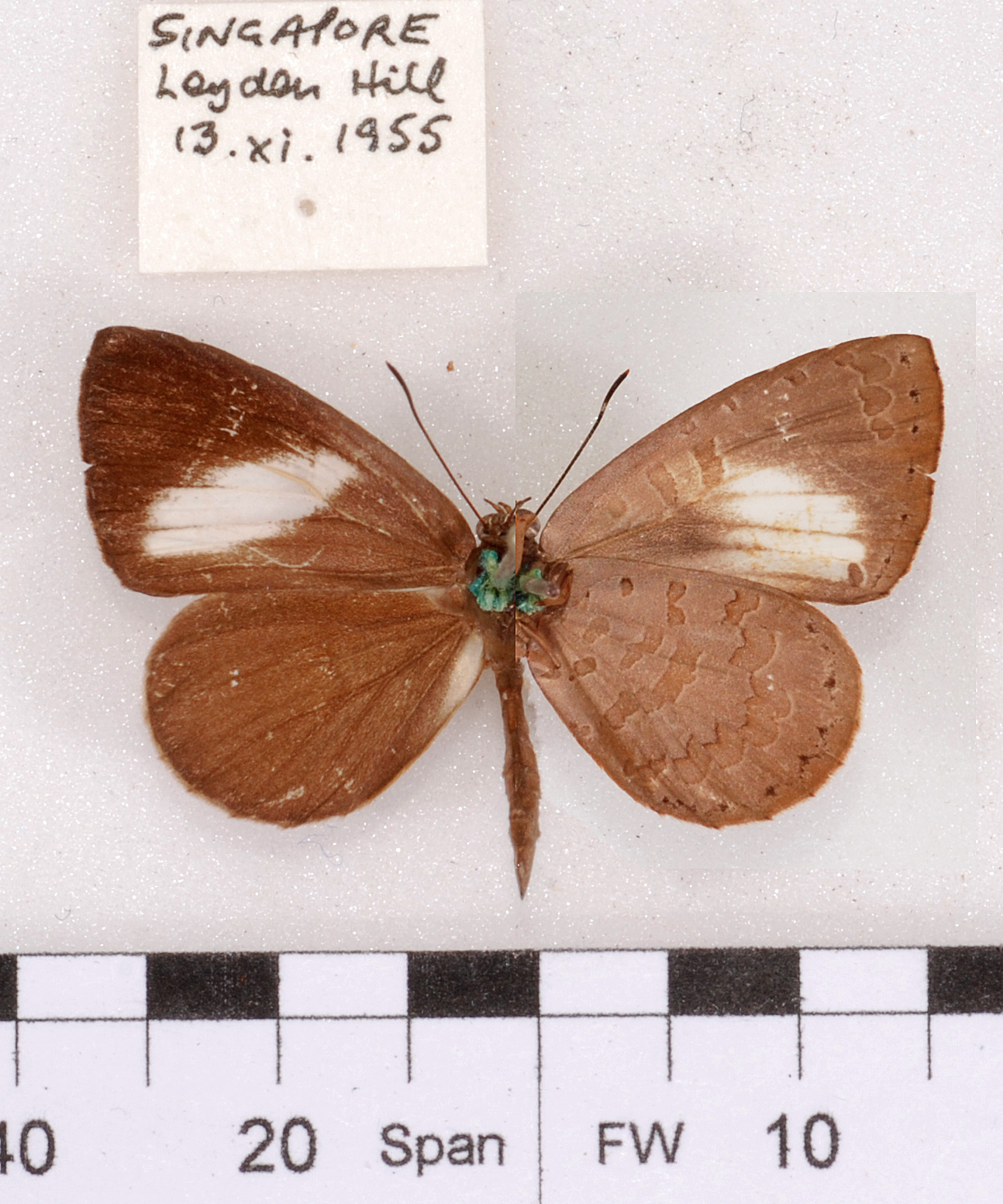
- Miletus gopara gopara

Scientific classification
- Kingdom: Animalia
- Phylum: Arthropoda
- Clade: Pancrustacea
- Class: Insecta
- Order: Lepidoptera
- Family: Lycaenidae
- Genus: Miletus
- Species: M. gopara

Binomial name
- Miletus gopara (de Nicéville, 1890)

Synonyms
- Gerydus gopara de Nicéville, 1890; Gerydus biggsi biggsi f. denticulata Fruhstorfer, 1913; Gerydus biggsi artaxatus Fruhstorfer, 1913; Gerydus biggsi artaxatus f. oichalia Fruhstorfer, 1913; Gerydus biggsi eustatius Fruhstorfer, 1913

= Miletus gopara =

Species of butterfly

Miletus gopara is a butterfly in the family Lycaenidae. It is found in Southeast Asia.

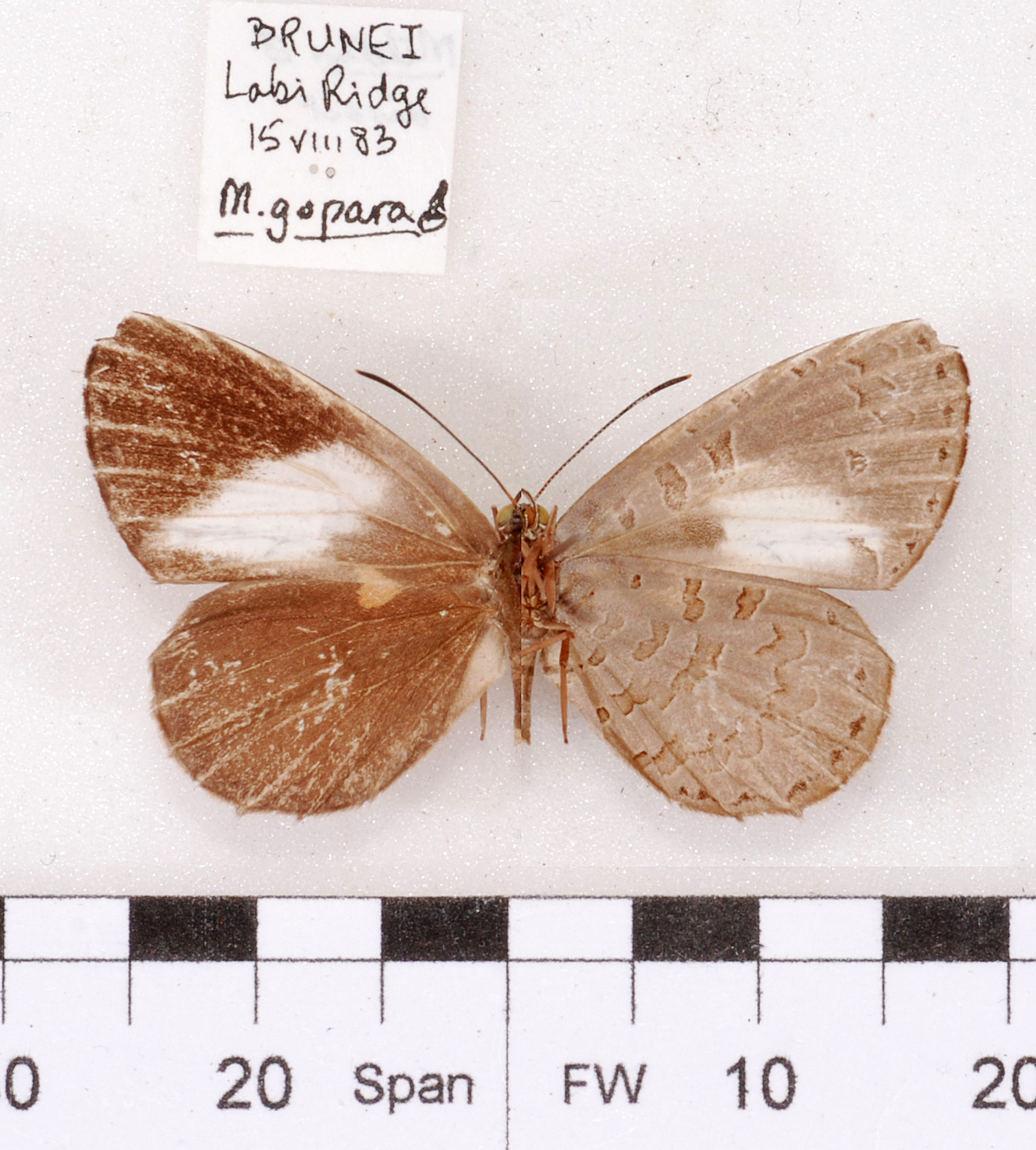
M. g. eustatius

The white oblique band of the forewing in the female but slightly broader than in the male. Sometimes the white band is dusted with a dull greyish brown.

== Subspecies ==
- Miletus gopara gopara (Thailand, Malaysian Peninsula, Tioman, Singapore, Sumatra, Java)
- Miletus gopara artaxatus (Fruhstorfer, 1913) (Java) white spot of the forewing being more imposing, the hindwings exhibiting more distinct, in the female more intensely red-brown and larger cucullate bands on a lighter grey-white ground. Under surface of both sexes recognizable by white diffuse spots between the light brown spots.
- Miletus gopara eustatius (Fruhstorfer, 1913) (Borneo) A smaller shape and with round instead of pointed forewings. Hindwings more sharply dentate. The upper surface of the forewing characterized by the absence of the. black basal spot characterizing the forewings of the nominate the white region besides filling up the whole cell and advancing as far as the costal margin. Under surface without the reddish distal tint of both wings, but with more distinct, anteterminal, black dots. Hindwings lighter grey, the three macular bands, however, particularly proximally more sharply defined and thereby more distinctly contrasting with the ground-colour.
- Miletus gopara pardus Eliot, 1961 (Sumatra)
