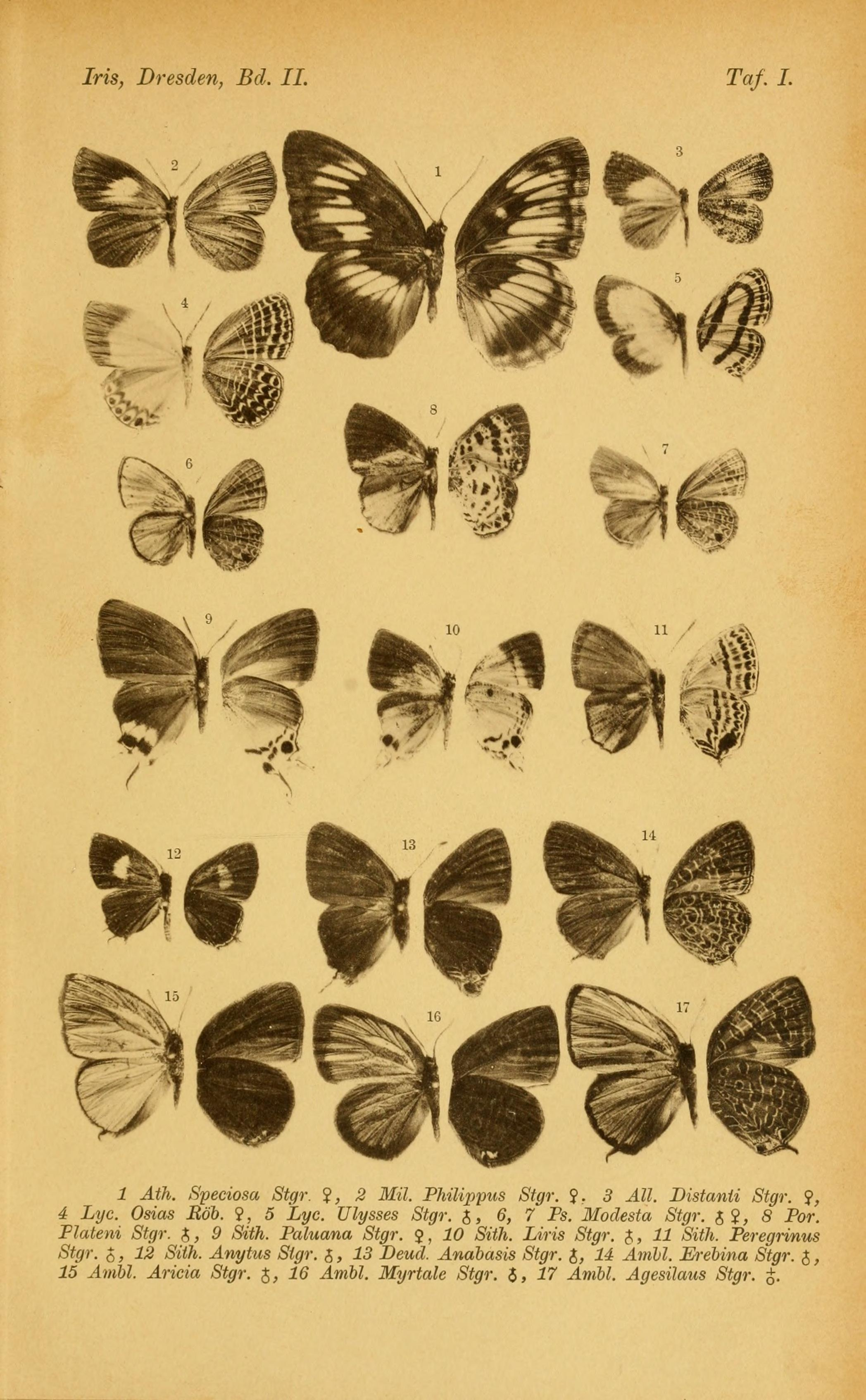
- Figure 2

Scientific classification
- Kingdom: Animalia
- Phylum: Arthropoda
- Class: Insecta
- Order: Lepidoptera
- Family: Lycaenidae
- Genus: Miletus
- Species: M. drucei

Binomial name
- Miletus drucei (Semper, 1889)

Synonyms
- Gerydus drucei Semper, 1889; Miletus philippus Staudinger, 1889; Gerydus boisduvali jacchus Fruhstorfer, 1913; Gerydus boisduvali paianius Fruhstorfer, 1913; Gerydus boisduvali epidurus Fruhstorfer, 1913; Gerydus biggsi metrovius Fruhstorfer, 1913; Gerydus courvoisieri phradimon Fruhstorfer, 1915

= Miletus drucei =

Species of butterfly

Miletus drucei is a butterfly in the family Lycaenidae. It is found in the Philippines and on Borneo (M. d. metrovius).

== Subspecies ==
- Miletus drucei drucei
- Miletus drucei metrovius (Fruhstorfer, 1913) (Borneo)
