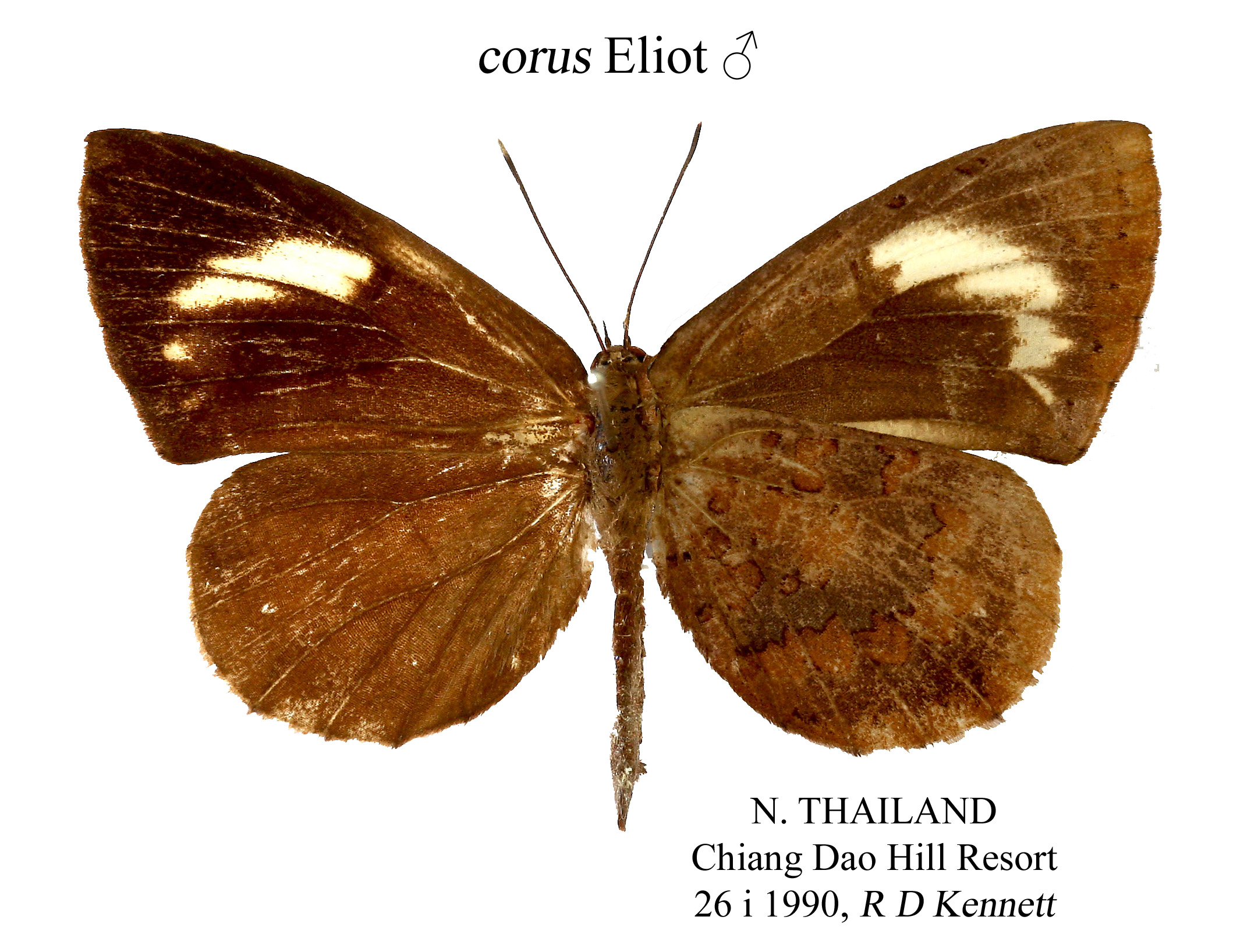
- Miletus croton corvus

Scientific classification
- Kingdom: Animalia
- Phylum: Arthropoda
- Clade: Pancrustacea
- Class: Insecta
- Order: Lepidoptera
- Family: Lycaenidae
- Genus: Miletus
- Species: M. croton

Binomial name
- Miletus croton (Doherty, 1889)

Synonyms
- Gerydus croton Doherty, 1889; Gerydus croton tavoyana Evans, 1932; Gerydys croton karennia Evans, 1932; Miletus karennia; Miletus croton corvus

= Miletus croton =

Species of butterfly

Miletus croton is a butterfly in the family Lycaenidae. It is found in Asia.

== Subspecies ==
- Miletus croton croton (Burma)
- Miletus croton corus Eliot, 1961 (southern Shan States, north-western Thailand)
- Miletus croton karennia Evans, 1932 (Karen Hills)
