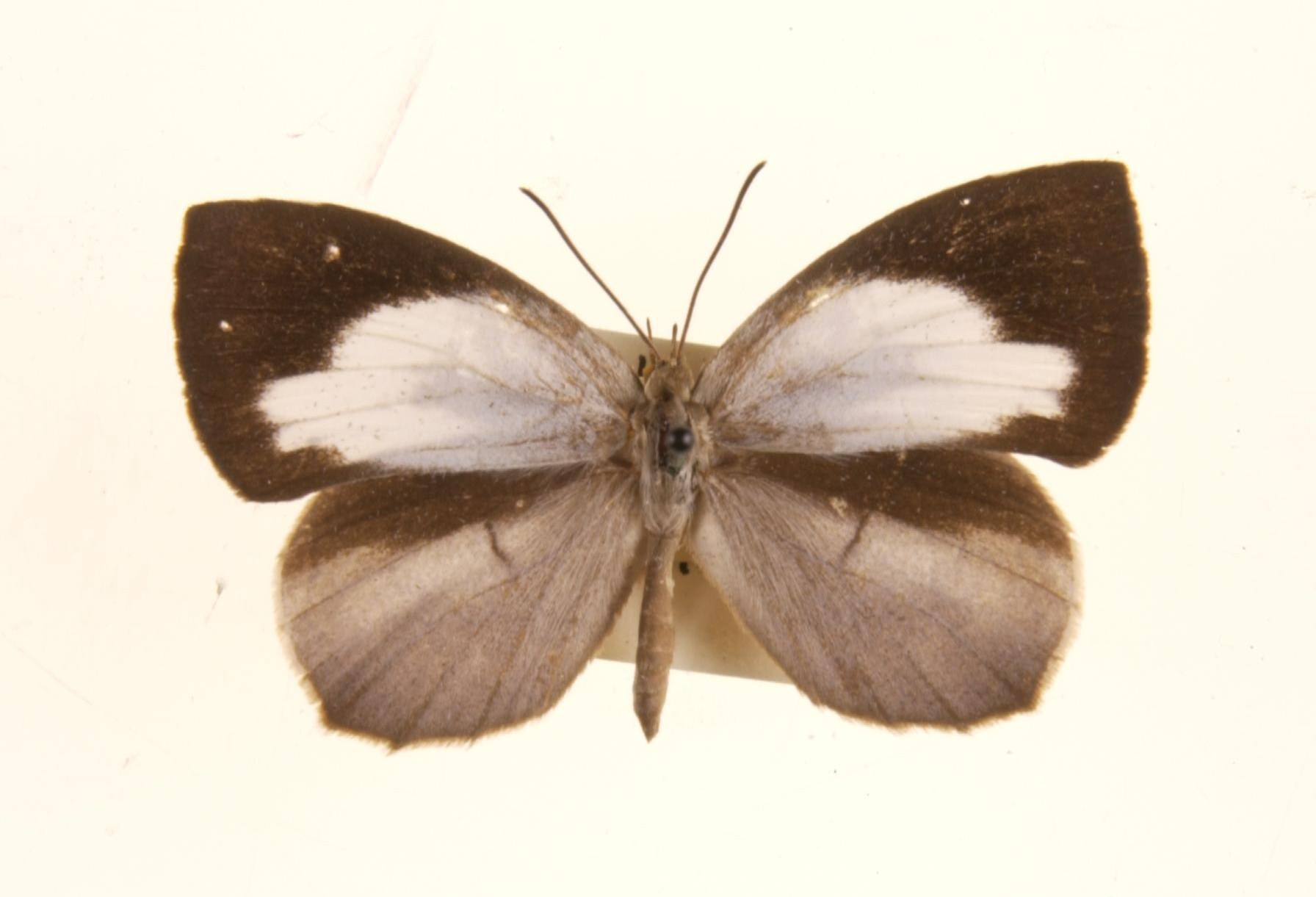
- Female from Malaya

Scientific classification
- Kingdom: Animalia
- Phylum: Arthropoda
- Class: Insecta
- Order: Lepidoptera
- Family: Lycaenidae
- Genus: Miletus
- Species: M. symethus

Binomial name
- Miletus symethus (Cramer, 1777)

Synonyms
- Papilio symethus Cramer, [1777]; Gerydus symethus; Symetha pandu Horsfield, 1828; Gerydus symethus acampsis Fruhstorfer, 1913; Gerydus symethus batuensis Fruhstorfer, 1914; Gerydus symethus edonus Fruhstorfer, 1913; Gerydus symethus hierophantes Fruhstorfer, 1915; Gerydus symethus perlucidus Fruhstorfer, 1913; Gerydus symethus megaris Fruhstorfer, 1913; Gerydus petronius Distant & Pryer, 1887; Gerydus symethus diopeithes Fruhstorfer, 1913; Gerydus symethus hieropous Fruhstorfer, 1915; Gerydus symethus bangkanus Fruhstorfer, 1914; Gerydus symethus philopator Fruhstorfer, 1914; Miletus ancon solitaria Okubo, 1983; Gerydus symethus vespasianus Fruhstorfer, 1913

= Miletus symethus =

Species of butterfly

Miletus symethus, the great brownie, is a small butterfly found in India that belongs to the lycaenids or blues family. The species was first described by Pieter Cramer in 1777.

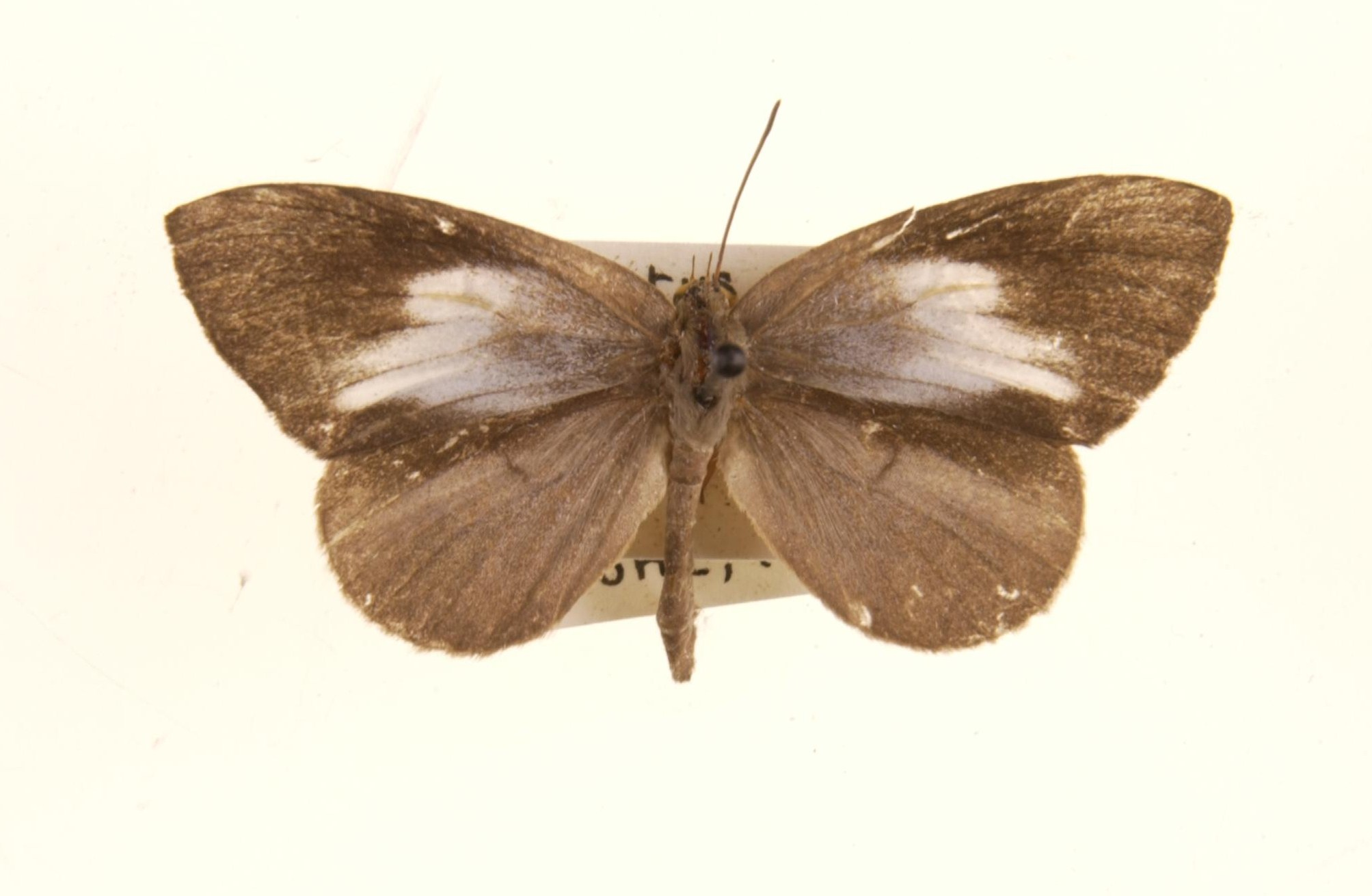
Male

== Range ==
It is found in the Naga Hills in India, Myanmar, Malaya, Sumatra and the Philippines.

== Status ==
The species is considered very rare.

== Description ==
A small butterfly, 40 to 50 mm in wingspan, it is the largest of the genus. The upper forewing in both sexes has a broad white discal band which extends right up to dorsum, the upper edge of which is sharply angled at vein 3. The upper hindwing has a pale discal streak.

=== Technical description ===
The male has the upperside of wings dusky brownish black. The ground colour of the forewings darker, almost pure black in fresh specimens, on the apical third of the wing; a short streak in the middle of interspace 1, a more outwardly produced similar streak in interspace 2, basal halves of interspaces 3 and 4, the lower apex of the discoidal cell and the extreme base of interspace 5, white, all forming a median conspicuous irregular white patch on the wing, narrowly traversed by the veins which are greyish brown. Hindwing: more uniform, slightly darker on its anterior half. Underside: light brown with an ochraceous tint. Forewing: the median white patch as on the upperside but larger, its margins less clearly defined, continued posteriorly to the dorsal margin; obscure catenulated (in the form of a chain), incomplete, transverse, white-margined narrow bands, two at base and two or three very short ones above the white median patch on the costal area, from between the outer two of these latter a transverse, zigzag, very slender, somewhat obscure white line crosses the anterior portion of the wing to vein 4; lastly a pre-tornal quadrate brown spot near apex of interspace 1a and an obscure sub-terminal transverse series of slightly lunular small brown spots; the ground colour terminally paler and more ochraceous than on the inner portions of the wing. Hindwing: crossed by very obscure sinuous brown and white slender lines, that on the costal area form very short, obsolescent, catenulated narrow brown bands; a subterminal series of brown slender lunules, sometimes obsolete. Antennae, head, thorax and abdomen brown; beneath: paler, the palpi and thorax more or less white.

The female has the upperside forewings of dark brown; base shaded with greyish brown; the white median patch as in the male, but very much larger, its upper margin irregularly curved; it is spread over the anterior two-thirds of the cell, extends beyond it into the bases of interspaces 4, 5 and 6, and below the cell it occupies the basal four-fifths of interspaces 1 and 2. Hindwing: costal margin broadly dark brownish; wing posteriorly from below the subcostal vein and vein 6a beautiful pale bluish-grey; a broad whitish streak beyond the cell not reaching the termen. Underside, forewing: the median white patch as on the upperside but larger, extending to the dorsal margin and base of cell; base of wing, costal margin above the sub-costal vein and conjoined upper discal obliquely-placed patch greyish brown; apex of wing whitish, termen between veins 1 and 6 broadly stained with rusty; a conspicuous rusty pretornal spot; some obscure white-margined spots at base of cell and along costa, and a transverse sub-terminal series of black dots. Hindwing: pale ochraceous white, darkening to rusty brown towards the middle of the termen; a subbasal, a median and a discal transverse incomplete macular brown band, each spot in the bands margined on the inner and outer sides by slender black lines; finally a subterminal transverse series of short slender black threads. Antenna, head, thorax and abdomen as in the male.

== Taxonomy ==
The butterfly was earlier known as Gerydus symethus (Cramer).

== Subspecies ==
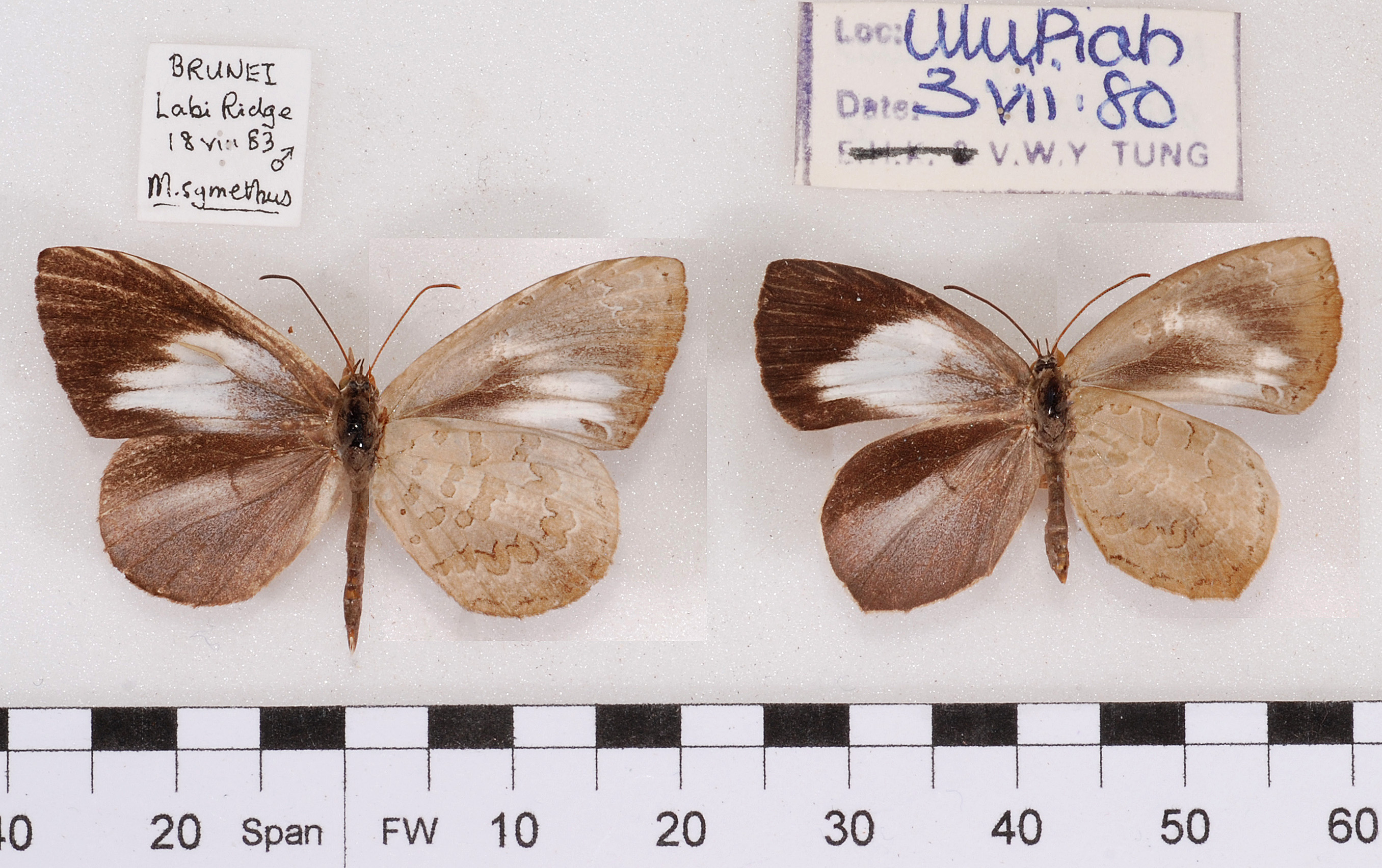
M. s. petronius

- Miletus symethus symethus (Java)
- Miletus symethus acampsis (Fruhstorfer, 1913) (northern Sumatra)
- Miletus symethus atimonicus Murayama & Okamura, 1973
- Miletus symethus batuensis (Fruhstorfer, 1914) (Batu Islands)
- Miletus symethus edonus (Fruhstorfer, 1913) (Philippines: Palawan)
- Miletus symethus hierophantes (Fruhstorfer, 1915) (northern Borneo, Sulu Islands)
- Miletus symethus nuctus Eliot, 1961 (Sumatra)
- Miletus symethus perlucidus (Fruhstorfer, 1913) (Bali, Lombok, eastern Java)
- Miletus symethus petronius (Distant & Pryer, 1887) (Burma, Thailand, Langkawi, Malay Peninsula, Singapore, Borneo, Bangka, Natuna, Belitung, Karimata)
- Miletus symethus phantus Eliot, 1986 (Philippines: Marinduque, Luzon)
- Miletus symethus philopator (Fruhstorfer, 1914) (Philippines)
- Miletus symethus solitarius Okubo, 1983 (Tioman)
- Miletus symethus vespasianus (Fruhstorfer, 1913) (Nias)
