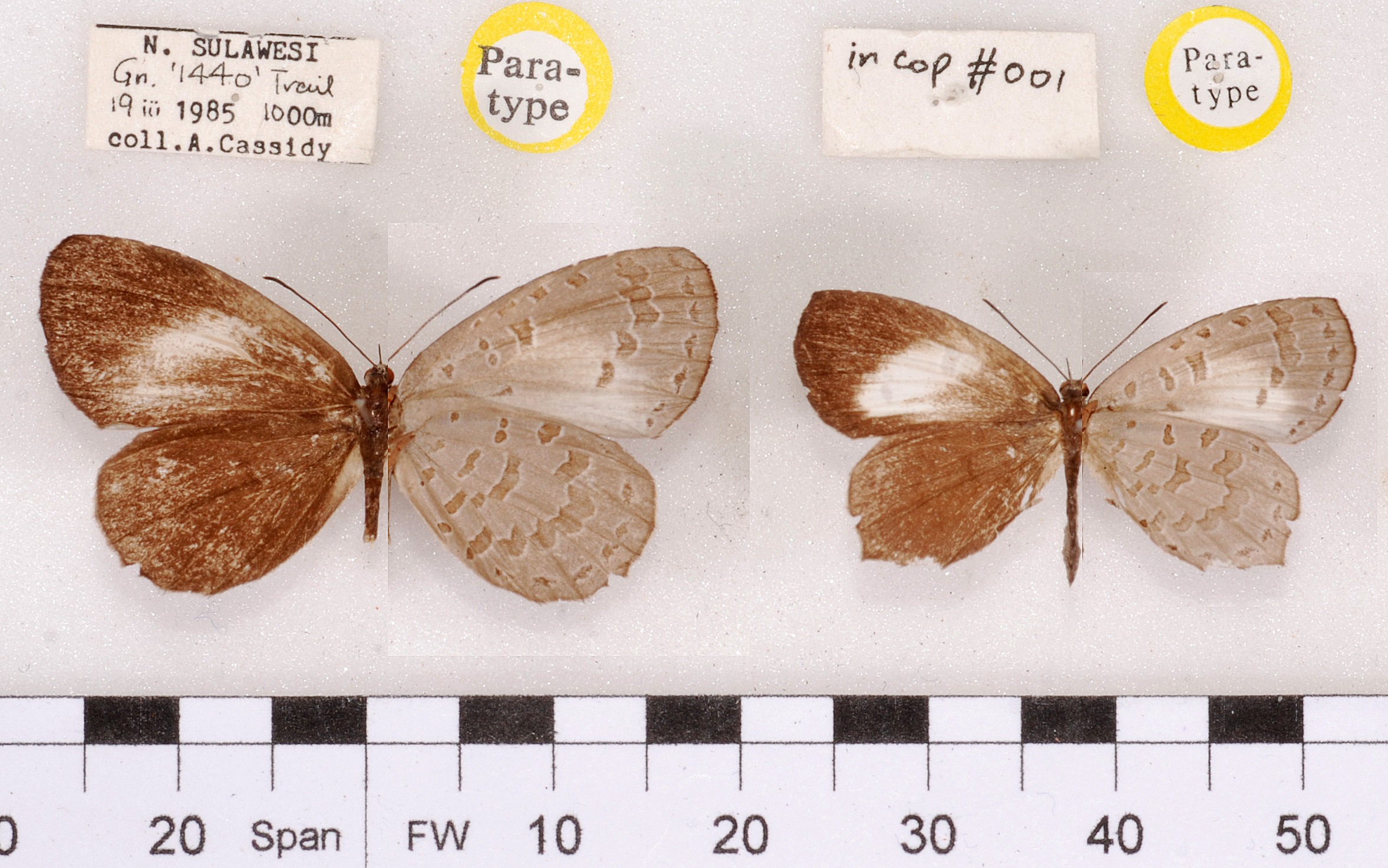
- Miletus rosei

Scientific classification
- Kingdom: Animalia
- Phylum: Arthropoda
- Clade: Pancrustacea
- Class: Insecta
- Order: Lepidoptera
- Family: Lycaenidae
- Subfamily: Miletinae
- Tribe: Miletini
- Genus: Miletus; Hübner, [1819]

Synonyms
- Symetha Horsfield, [1828]; Gerydus Boisduval, [1836]; Archaeogerydus Fruhstorfer, 1915

= Miletus (butterfly) =

Butterfly genus in family Lycaenidae

Miletus is a genus of butterflies sometimes called brownies. Its species are found in the eastern Palearctic realm and the Indomalayan realm, and some stray east of the Wallace Line. The genus was erected by Jacob Hübner around 1819. Miletus is the type genus of the subfamily Miletinae.

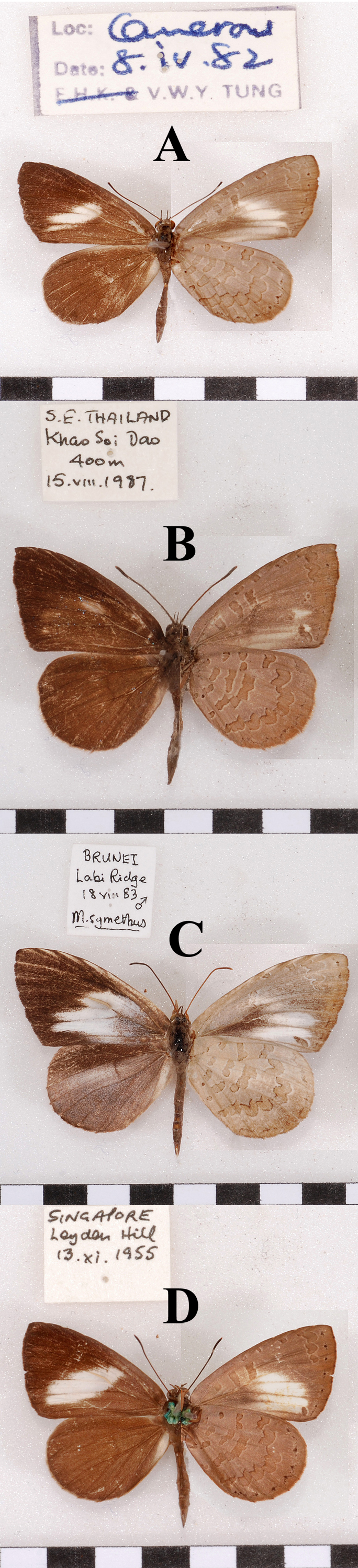
Miletus species groups, sensu Eliot, 1961. A - Boisduvali Gp. M. biggsii West Malaysia B - Chinensis Gp. M. chinensis Thailand C - Symethus Gp. M. symethus Brunei D - Zinckenii Gp. M. gopara Singapore All males

== Species ==
- boisduvali species group
  - Miletus biggsii (Distant, 1884)
  - Miletus boisduvali Moore, 1857
  - Miletus cellarius (Fruhstorfer, 1913) Borneo
  - Miletus drucei (Semper, 1888)
- chinensis species group
  - Miletus bannanus Huang & Xue, 2004 Yunnan
  - Miletus chinensis C. Felder, 1862
  - Miletus croton (Doherty, 1889)
  - Miletus gaesa (de Nicéville, 1895) Sumatra
  - Miletus mallus (Fruhstorfer, 1913)
  - Miletus nymphis (Fruhstorfer, 1913) Sumatra
- melanion species group
  - Miletus bazilanus (Fruhstorfer, 1913) Philippines
  - Miletus melanion C. Felder & R. Felder, 1865
- symethus species group
  - Miletus ancon Doherty, 1889
  - Miletus archilocus Fruhstorfer, 1913 Vietnam
  - Miletus atimonicus Murayama & Okamura, 1973 Philippines
  - Miletus celinus Eliot, 1961 'S. Celebes'
  - Miletus gallus (de Nicéville, 1894) Sumatra
  - Miletus gigantes (de Nicéville, 1894) Sumatra
  - Miletus heracleion (Doherty, 1891) Perak, Malaya
  - Miletus leos (Guérin-Ménéville, 1830)
  - Miletus rosei Cassidy, 1995
  - Miletus symethus (Cramer, [1777])
  - Miletus takanamii Eliot, 1986 Philippines
- zinckenii species group
  - Miletus gaetulus (de Nicéville, 1894) Sumatra
  - Miletus gopara (de Nicéville, 1890)
  - Miletus valeus (Fruhstorfer, 1913) "Hab. Malaya and N.E. Sumatra"
  - Miletus zinckenii C. Felder & R. Felder, 1865
