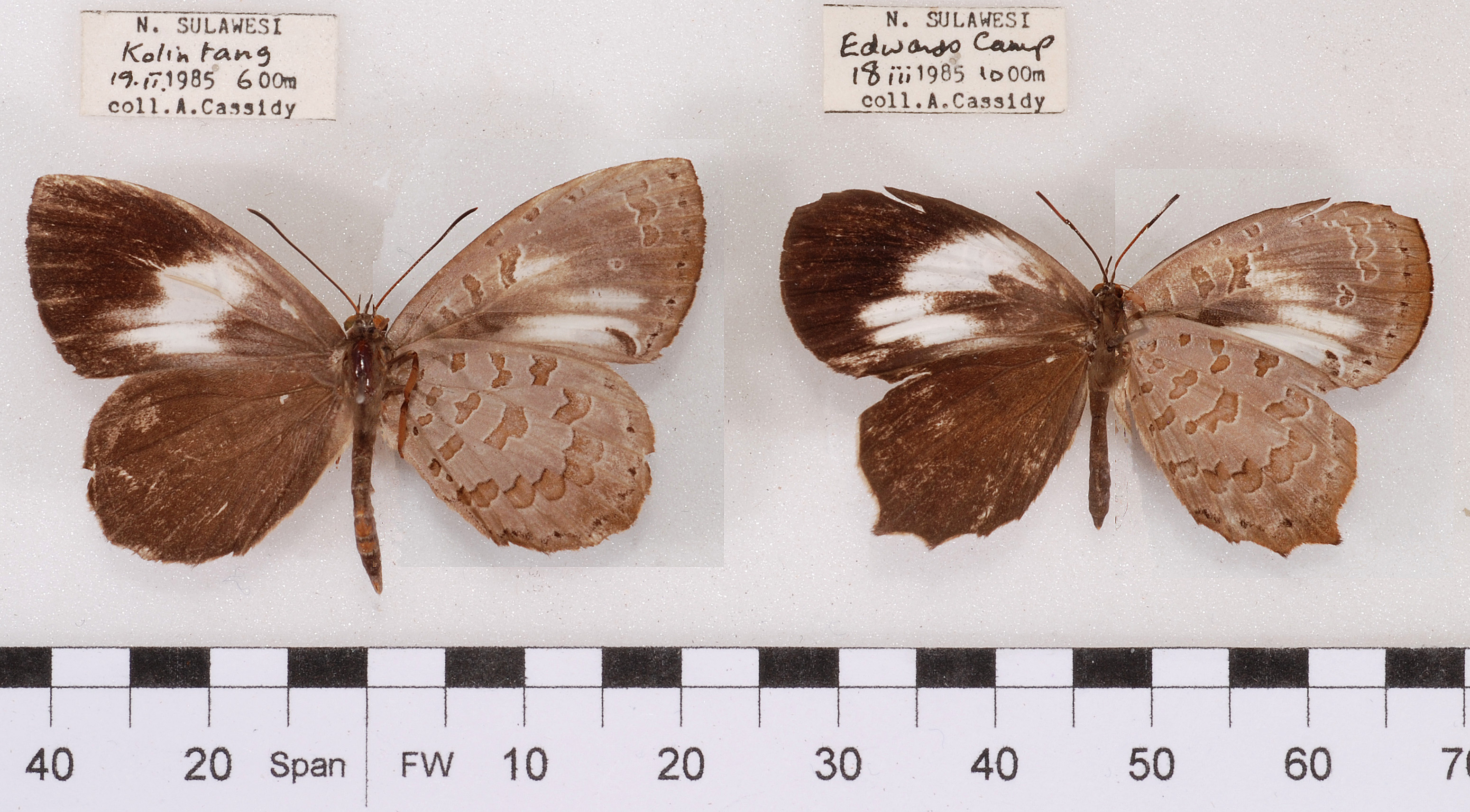
- Miletus leos maximus

Scientific classification
- Kingdom: Animalia
- Phylum: Arthropoda
- Class: Insecta
- Order: Lepidoptera
- Family: Lycaenidae
- Genus: Miletus
- Species: M. leos

Binomial name
- Miletus leos (Guérin-Ménéville, 1830)

Synonyms
- Symethus leos Guérin-Ménéville, 1830; Gerydus boisduvali Butler, 1884 (preocc. Moore, 1857); Gerydus leos aronicus Fruhstorfer, 1914; Gerydus leos rex Fruhstorfer, 1913 nec Boisduval, 1832; Gerydus leos nineyanus Fruhstorfer, 1914; Gerydus leos acrisius Fruhstorfer, 1914; Gerydus leos catoleucos Fruhstorfer, 1913; Gerydus leos nineyanus Fruhstorfer, 1914; Gerydus leos acrisius Fruhstorfer, 1914; Gerydus leos florensis Fruhstorfer, 1913; Gerydus leos eulus Fruhstorfer, 1913; Gerydus leos meronus Fruhstorfer, 1913; Gerydus leos amphiarus Fruhstorfer, 1913; Gerydus leos gardineri Fruhstorfer, 1914; Gerydus leos mangolicus Fruhstorfer, 1913; Gerydus leos maximus Holland, 1890; Gerydus leos maximus f. divisa Fruhstorfer, 1913; Gerydus leos sarus Fruhstorfer, 1913; Gerydus symethus vaneeckei Toxopeus, 1930; Gerydus ancon tellus Fruhstorfer, 1913; Gerydus teos Doherty, 1891; Gerydus leos virtus Fruhstorfer, 1913; Gerydus leos pentheus Fruhstorfer, 1913

= Miletus leos =

Species of butterfly

Miletus leos is a butterfly in the family Lycaenidae. It is found in Asia.

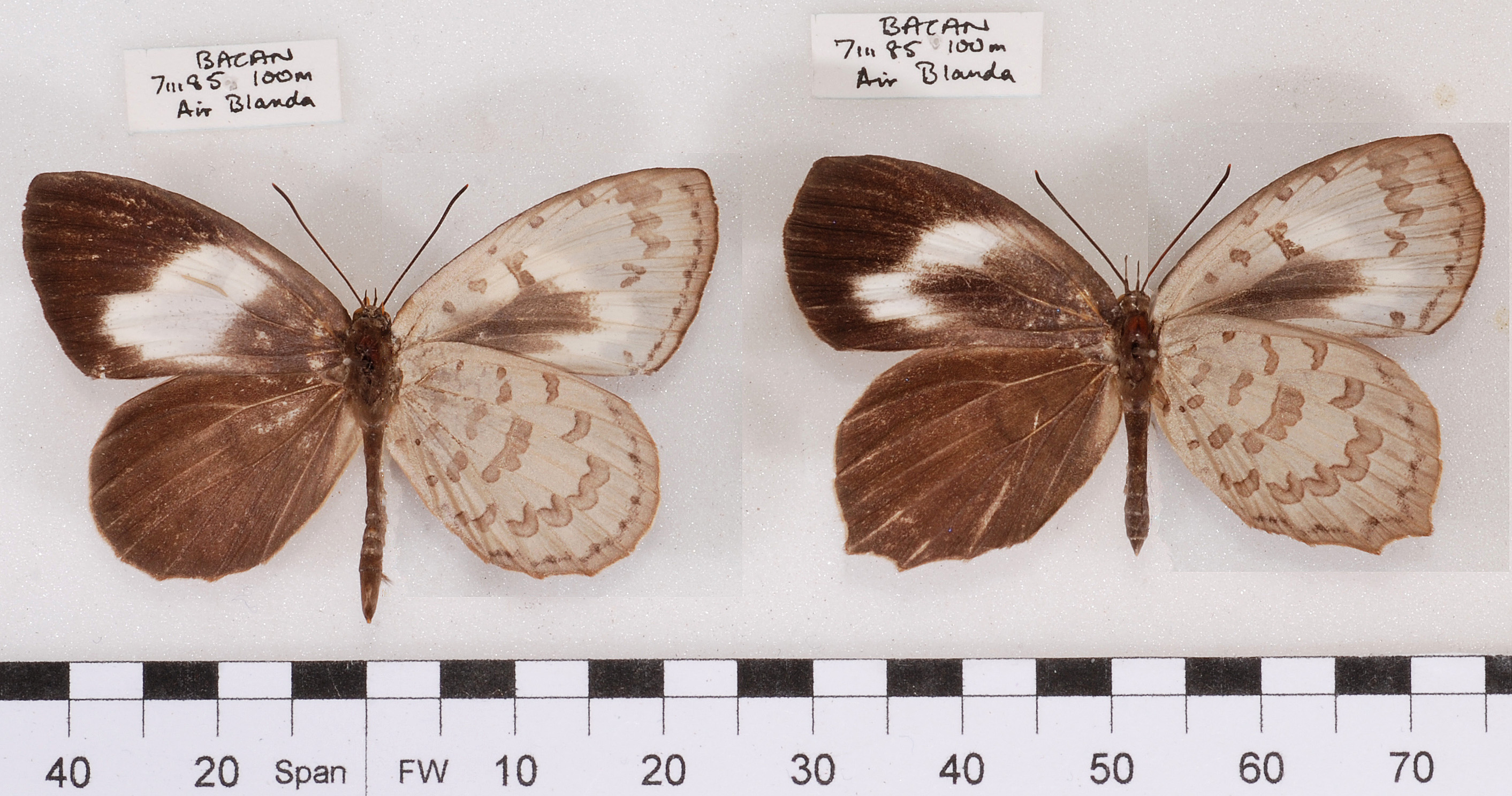
M. l. virtus

== Subspecies ==
- Miletus leos leos (southern Moluccas: Serang, Ambon, Buru)
- Miletus leos aronicus (Fruhstorfer, 1914) (Aru, Misool, Waigeu, New Guinea)
- Miletus leos catoleucos (Fruhstorfer, 1913) (Salayer)
- Miletus leos florensis (Fruhstorfer, 1913) (Flores, Pura, Adonara, Alor, possibly Sumbawa)
- Miletus leos mangolicus (Fruhstorfer, 1913) (Sula Islands)
- Miletus leos maximus (Holland, 1890) (Celebes, Bouton, Sangir, Talaut, Buton, Muna, Banggai)
- Miletus leos tellus (Fruhstorfer, 1913) (Wetar, Timor)
- Miletus leos teos (Doherty, 1891) (Sumba, possibly Sumbawa)
- Miletus leos virtus (Fruhstorfer, 1913) (northern Moluccas: Bachan, Ternate, Halmahera)
