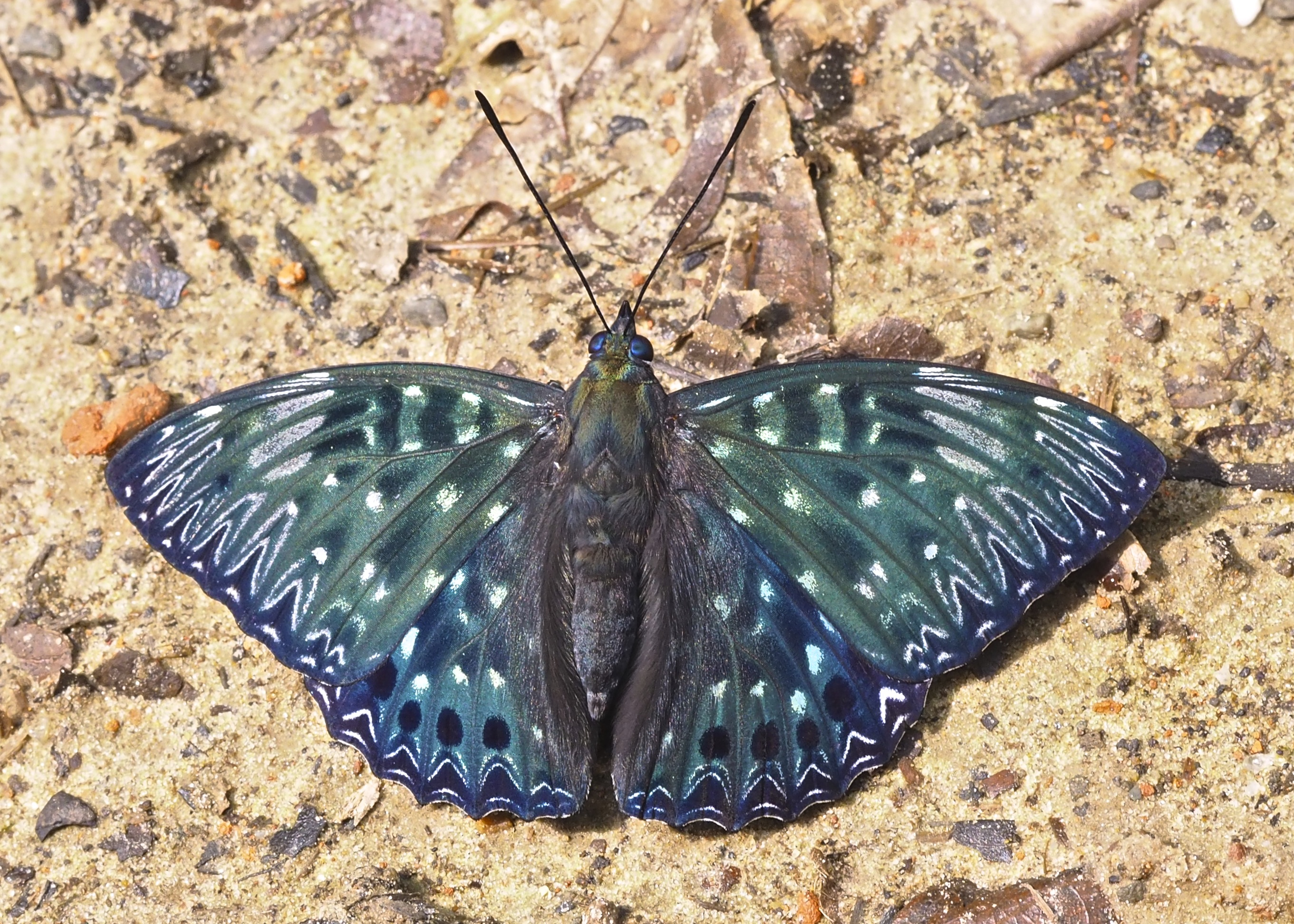
- In Assam
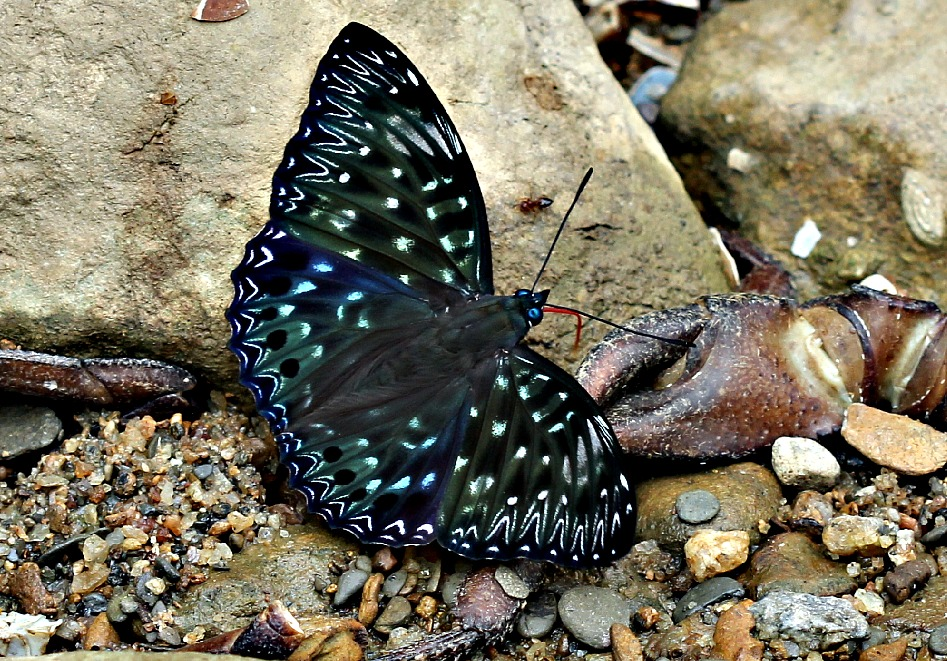
- In Meghalaya

Scientific classification
- Domain: Eukaryota
- Kingdom: Animalia
- Phylum: Arthropoda
- Class: Insecta
- Order: Lepidoptera
- Family: Nymphalidae
- Genus: Dichorragia
- Species: D. nesimachus

Binomial name
- Dichorragia nesimachus (Doyere, 1840)

Synonyms
- Adolias nesimachus Doyere, [1840]; Adolias nesimachus Boisduval, 1846; Dichorragia deiokes Fruhstorfer, 1913; Dichorragia nesseus Grose-Smith, 1893

= Dichorragia nesimachus =

Species of butterfly

Dichorragia nesimachus, the constable, is a species of nymphalid butterfly found in Asia. The genus was earlier considered to belong to the subfamily Cyrestinae and sometimes the Apaturinae, but is now considered as a sister of the genus Stibochiona in the subfamily Pseudergolinae. Several geographical forms with variations in colour are noted within the wide distribution range extending from India in the west to Japan in the east. In Vietnam, it is thought to show hill topping behaviour and is typically found in dense forest habitats. They may also be found mud puddling with other species.

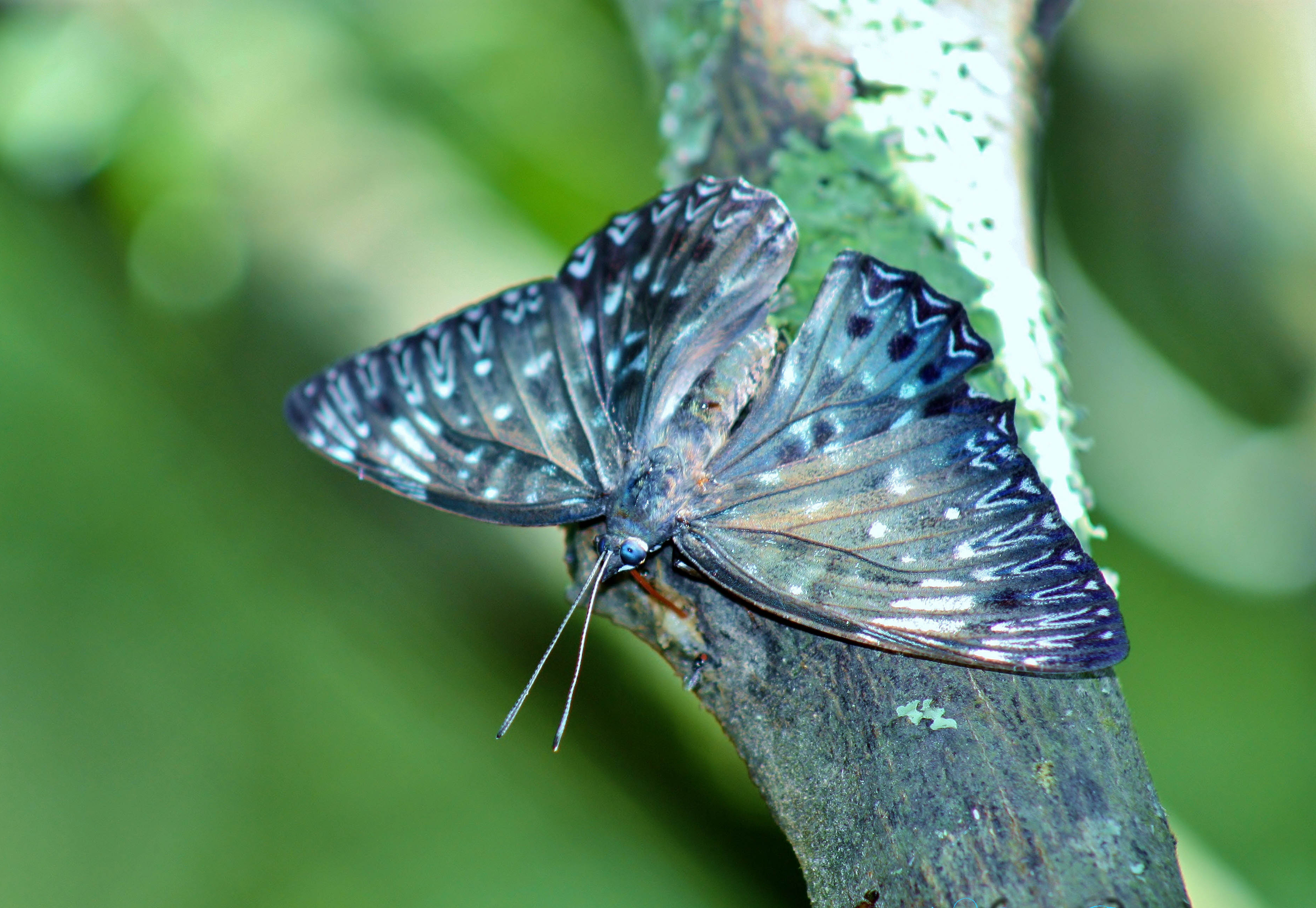
D. n. formosanus

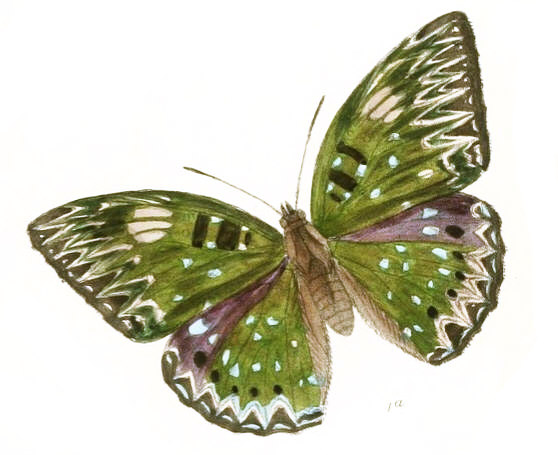

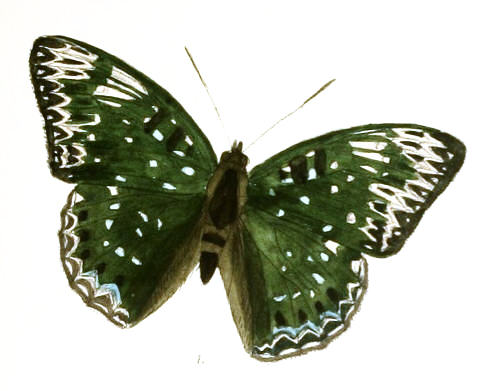

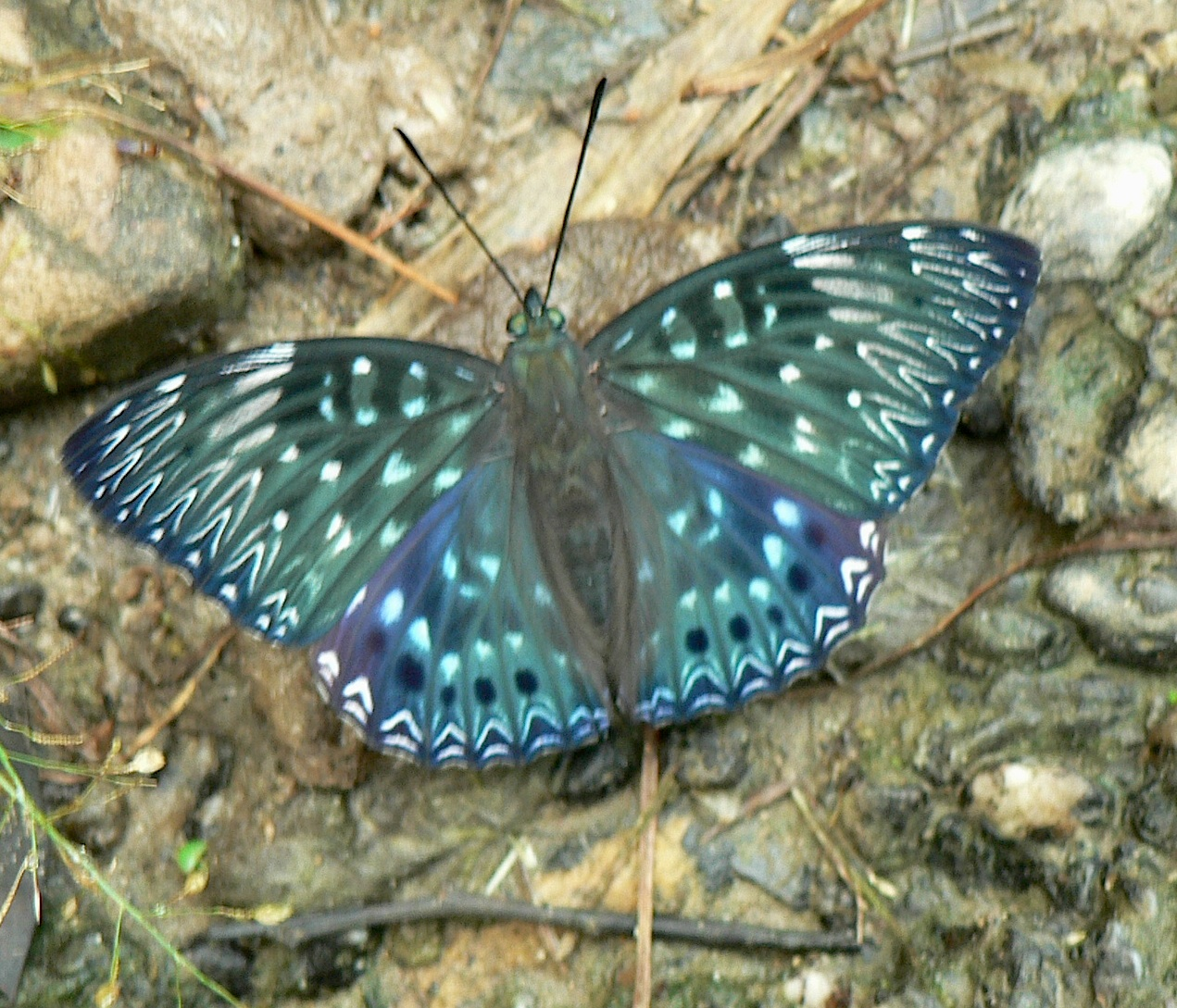

A closely related species Dichorragia ninus is found in New Guinea and surrounding islands although some authors include it as a subspecies of D. nesimachus.

== Subspecies ==
- D. n. nesimachus (Sikkim, Bhutan, Assam, Manipur - Indochina, South Yunnan)
- D. n. baliensis Shimagami, 1990 (Bali)
- D. n. deiokes Fruhstorfer, 1913 (southern Thailand, Peninsular Malaya)
- D. n. derdas Fruhstorfer, 1903 (Borneo)
- D. n. formosanus Fruhstorfer, 1909 (Taiwan)
- D. n. harpalycus Fruhstorfer, 1913 (Banggai Islands)
- D. n. machates Fruhstorfer, 1903 (Sumatra, Batu Islands)
- D. n. leytensis Shimagami, 1990 (Philippines: Leyte)
- D. n. luzonensis Shimagami, 1990 (Philippines: Luzon)
- D. n. mannus Fruhstorfer, 1898 (Java)
- D. n. nesiotes Fruhstorfer, 1903 (Japan)
- D. n. nesseus (Grose-Smith, 1893) (western China)
- D. n. niasicus Fruhstorfer, 1909 (Nias)
- D. n. peisandrus Fruhstorfer, 1913 (Sula Islands)
- D. n. peisistratus Fruhstorfer, 1913 (Philippines)
- D. n. pelurius Fruhstorfer, 1897 (Sulawesi)
- D. n. tanahmasa Sato & Hanafusa, 1993 (Batu Islands)
