= Chersonesia nicevillei =

Scientific classification
- Kingdom: Animalia
- Phylum: Arthropoda
- Clade: Pancrustacea
- Class: Insecta
- Order: Lepidoptera
- Family: Nymphalidae
- Genus: Chersonesia
- Species: C. niceville

Binomial name
- Chersonesia niceville Martin, 1895

Species of butterfly

Chersonesia niceville is an Indomalayan butterfly in the family Nymphalidae (Cyrestinae). It is found in Sumatra and Peninsular Malaysia.

C. nicevilleis larger than peraka, ground-coloured brilliant dark orange-yellow. The meridional stripes are double, the two basal ones dusted with fuscous. Black streaks mark the end of the cell on the forewing and stand basally to the second meridional stripe. The first meridional stripe is of irregular shape, broken into 3—4 spots. The submarginal band on the forewing is likewise twice interrupted, once on the first median nervule between the lowest link of the row and the next following large one above it. A broad strip of the ground-colour intervenes, and again on the third median nervule, which is surrounded as far as the terminal border by a strip of the ground-colour. The hindwing displays a distinct ocellate chain and, continuing in a straight line, two anal ocelli. The tail is barely visible, whereas the anal projection is indicated by the broadening of the inner marginal line. The under surface is paler, but dark markings.

The species is rare. The type specimen is in the Tring Museum. Four males are in the Martin Collection.
