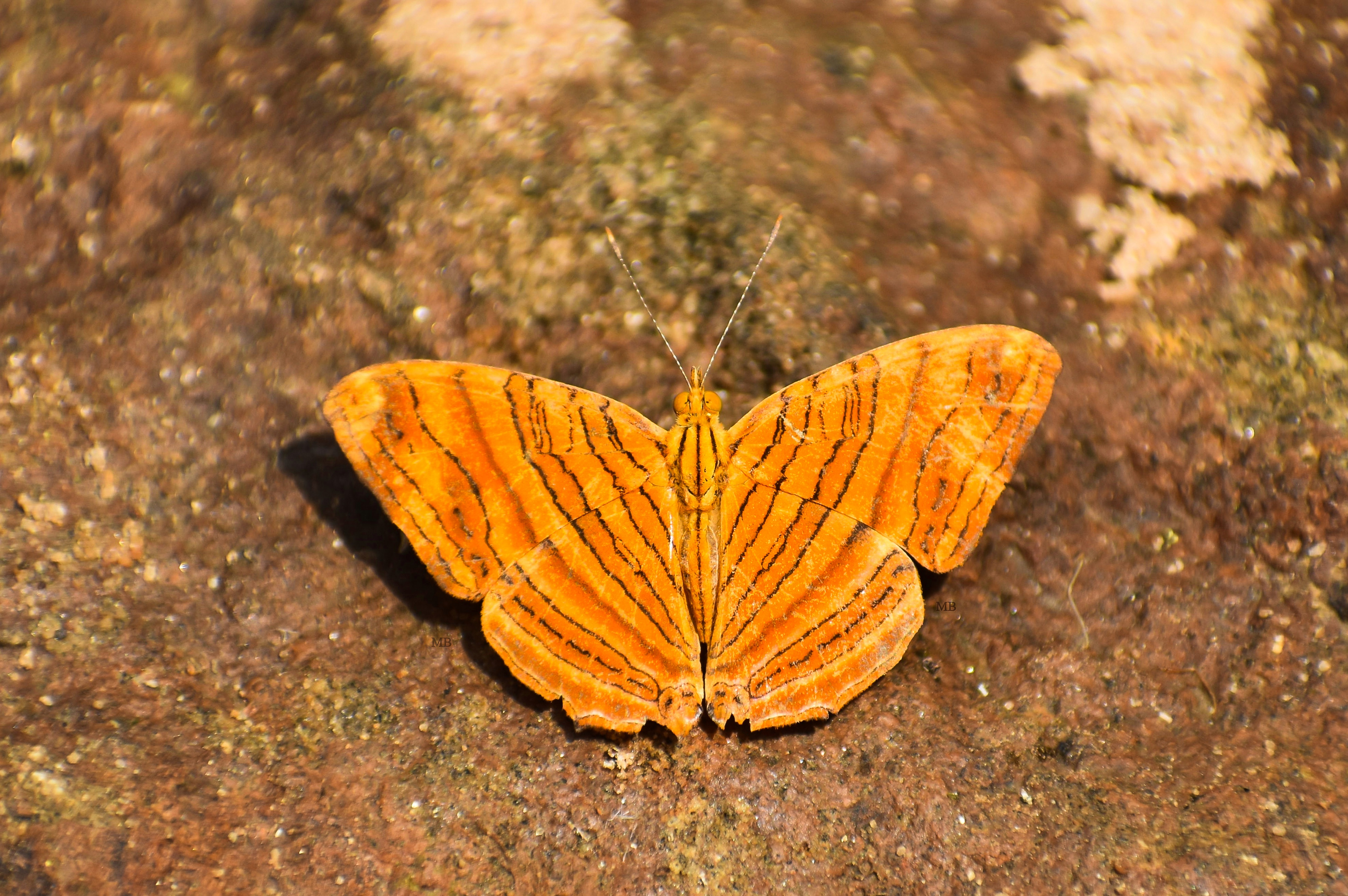
- Dorsal view

Scientific classification
- Kingdom: Animalia
- Phylum: Arthropoda
- Clade: Pancrustacea
- Class: Insecta
- Order: Lepidoptera
- Family: Nymphalidae
- Genus: Chersonesia
- Species: C. intermedia

Binomial name
- Chersonesia intermedia Martin, 1895

= Chersonesia intermedia =

Species of butterfly

Chersonesia intermedia, the intermediate maplet, is an Indomalayan butterfly of the family Nymphalidae (Cyrestinae). It is found from Assam to Peninsular Malaya then to Sumatra and Borneo. It is very similar to Chersonesia risa
