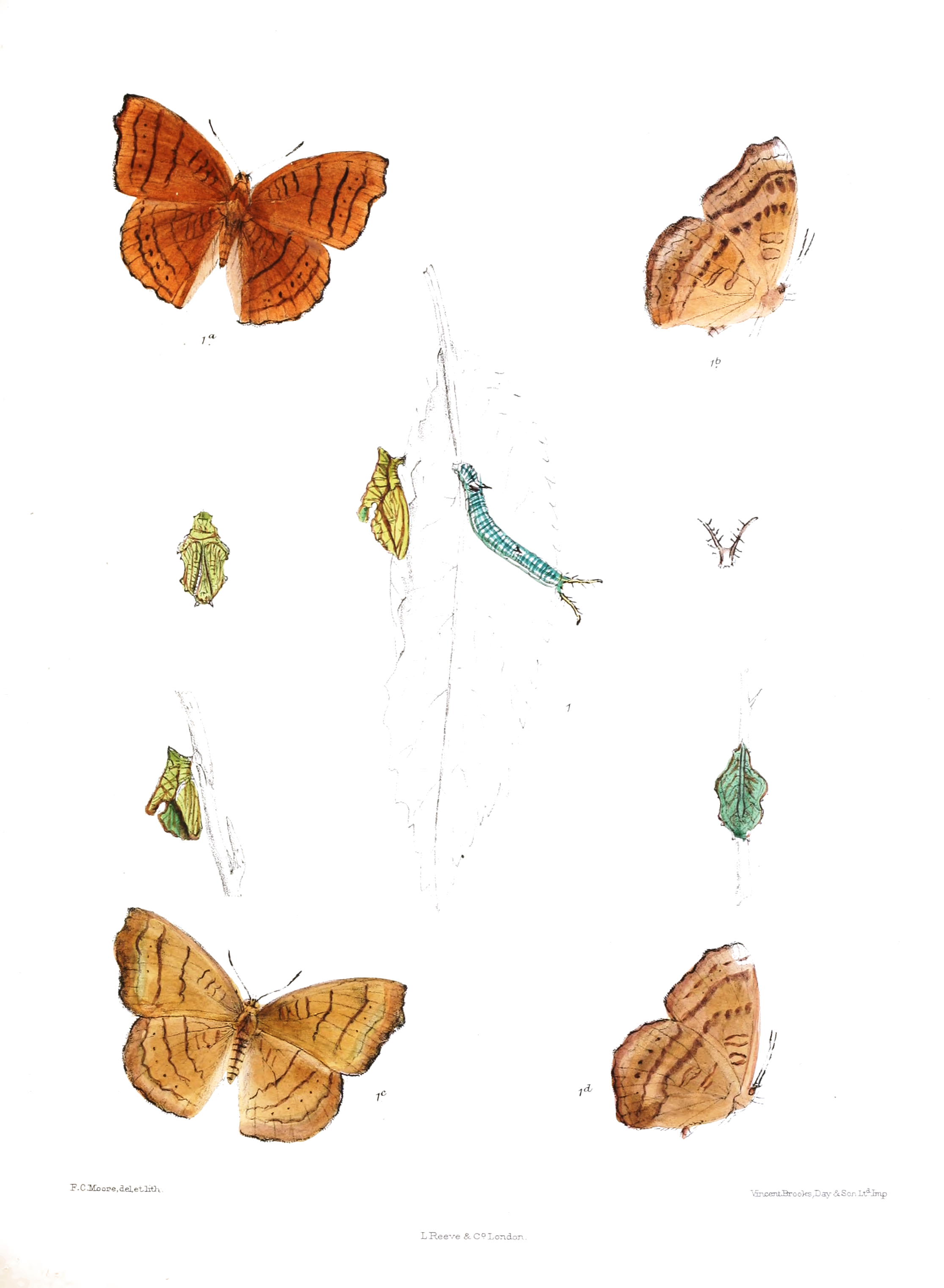
- Pseudergolis wedah

Scientific classification
- Domain: Eukaryota
- Kingdom: Animalia
- Phylum: Arthropoda
- Class: Insecta
- Order: Lepidoptera
- Family: Nymphalidae
- Subfamily: Pseudergolinae
- Genus: Pseudergolis; C. & R. Felder, [1867]

Species
- See text

= Pseudergolis =

Genus of brush-footed butterflies

Pseudergolis is a butterfly genus from the family Nymphalidae found in Southeast Asia. Some authorities place it in the subfamily Cyrestinae.

== Species ==
Listed alphabetically.

- Pseudergolis avesta C. & R. Felder, [1867] – Sulawesi Tabby
- Pseudergolis wedah (Kollar, 1848) – Tabby
