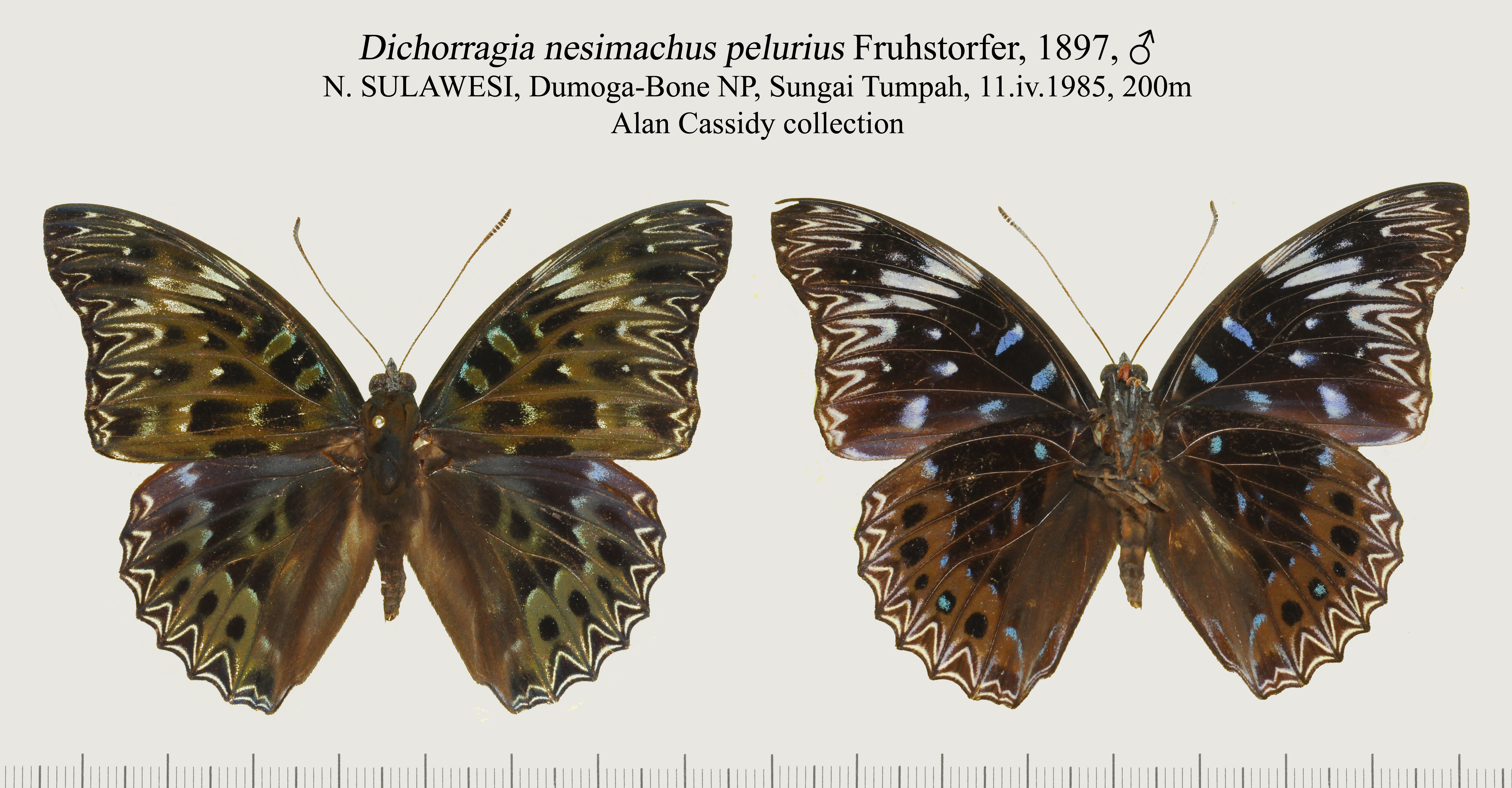
- Dichorragia nesimachus pelurius Fruhstorfer, 1897

Scientific classification
- Kingdom: Animalia
- Phylum: Arthropoda
- Class: Insecta
- Order: Lepidoptera
- Family: Nymphalidae
- Subfamily: Pseudergolinae
- Genus: Dichorragia; Butler, [1869]

Synonyms
- Dichorrhagia Scudder, 1882

= Dichorragia =

Genus of brush-footed butterflies

Dichorragia is a genus of butterflies in the family Nymphalidae (subfamily Cyrestinae)

== Species ==
- Dichorragia nesimachus (Doyère, [1840])
- Dichorragia ninus (C. & R. Felder, 1859)
  - D. n. ninas Moluccas
  - D. n. distinctus Röber, 1894 New Guinea
  - D. n. buruensis Joicey & Talbot, 1924 Buru
