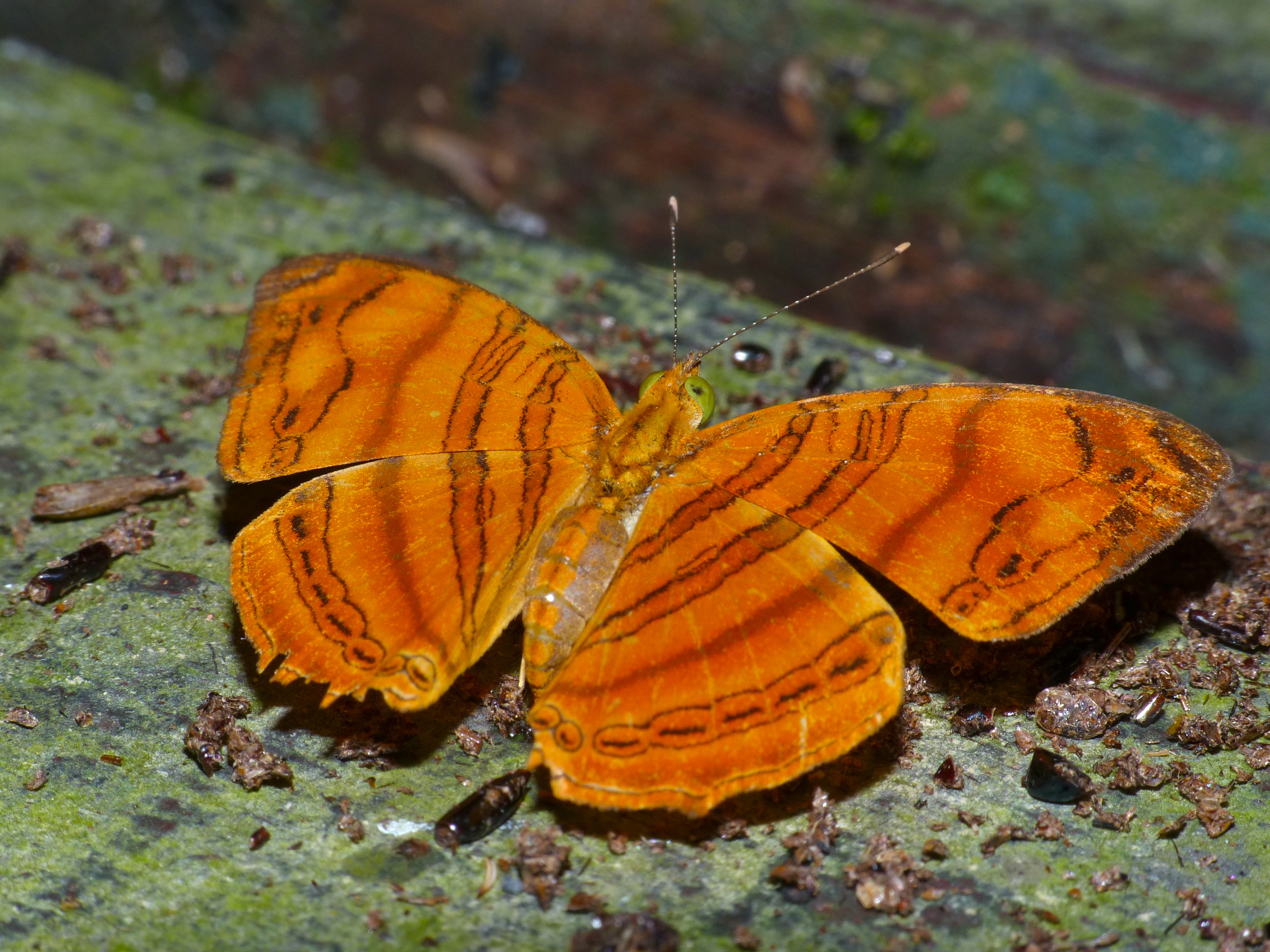

Scientific classification
- Kingdom: Animalia
- Phylum: Arthropoda
- Clade: Pancrustacea
- Class: Insecta
- Order: Lepidoptera
- Family: Nymphalidae
- Genus: Chersonesia
- Species: C. rahria

Binomial name
- Chersonesia rahria (Moore, [1858])

Synonyms
- Cyrestis rahria Moore, [1858]; Cyrestis rahria ingens van Eecke, 1918; Chersonesia tiomana Pendlebury, 1933; Chersonesia rahria var. apicusta Hagen, 1898; Chersonesia rahria var. apicusta Hagen, 1902; Cyrestis celebensis Rothschild, 1892

= Chersonesia rahria =

Species of butterfly

Chersonesia rahria is an Indomalayan butterfly of the family Nymphalidae (Cyrestinae). It is found from Manipur and Naga Hills to Burma then from Borneo to Celebes.

== Subspecies ==
- C. r. rahria (Peninsular Malaya, Java, Sumatra, Borneo)
- C. r. tiomana Pendlebury, 1933 (Pulau Tioman)
- C. r. apicusta Hagen, 1898 (Mentawai Islands)
- C. r. sanna Fruhstorfer, 1906 (Batu Island)
- C. r. celebensis (Rothschild, 1892) (Sulawesi)
- C. r. mangolina Fruhstorfer, 1899 (Sula Islands)
- C. r. banggaina Tsukada & Nishiyama, 1985 (Banggai)
