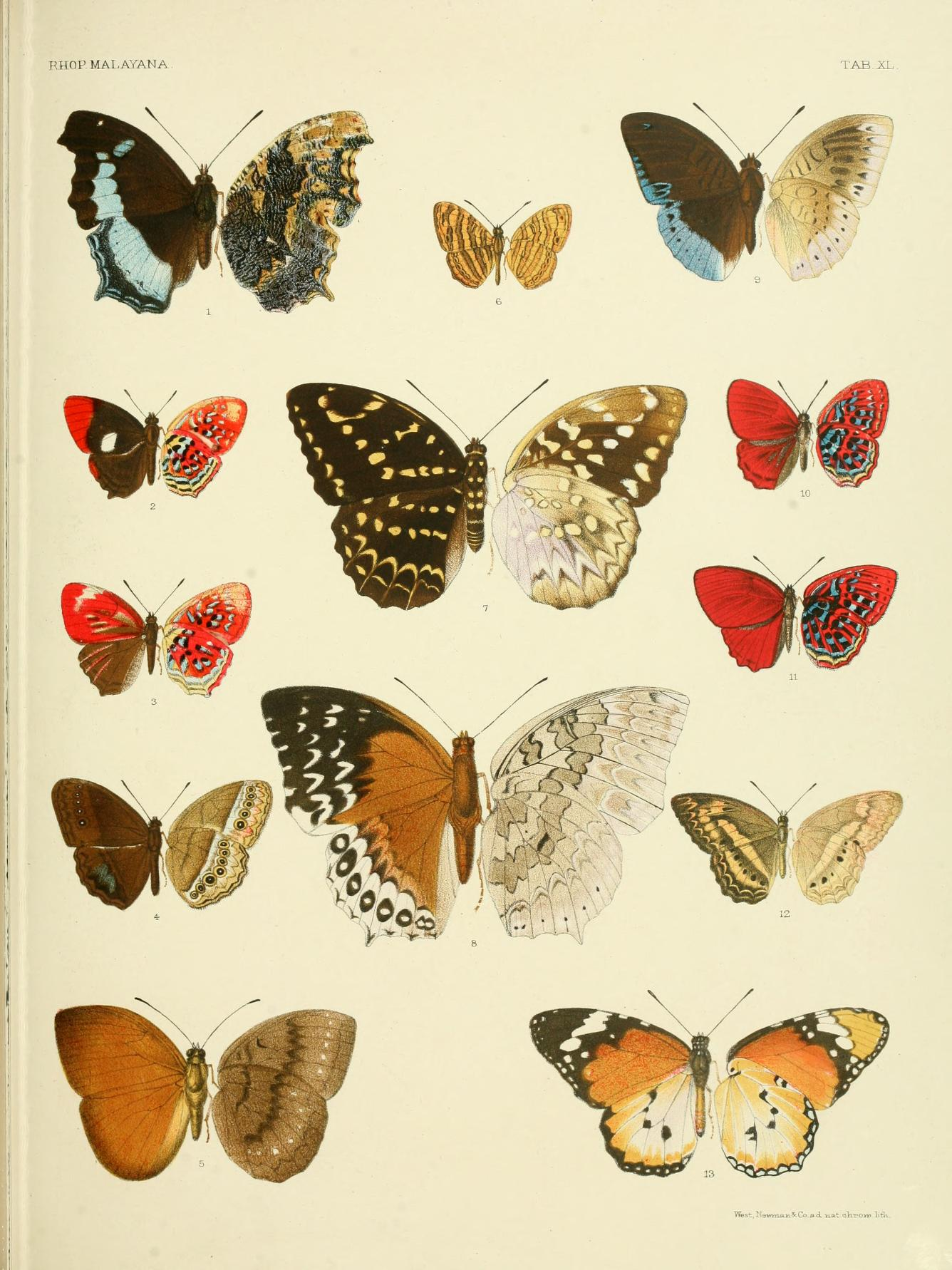
- Chersonesia peraka in Rhopalocera Malayana (figure 6)

Scientific classification
- Kingdom: Animalia
- Phylum: Arthropoda
- Clade: Pancrustacea
- Class: Insecta
- Order: Lepidoptera
- Family: Nymphalidae
- Genus: Chersonesia
- Species: C. peraka

Binomial name
- Chersonesia peraka Distant, 1884

= Chersonesia peraka =

Species of butterfly

Chersonesia peraka is an Indomalayan butterfly of the family Nymphalidae (Cyrestinae). It is found in the Indomalayan realm from Burma to Malaysia and on to Java, Bali, Borneo, Sumatra and Nias.
