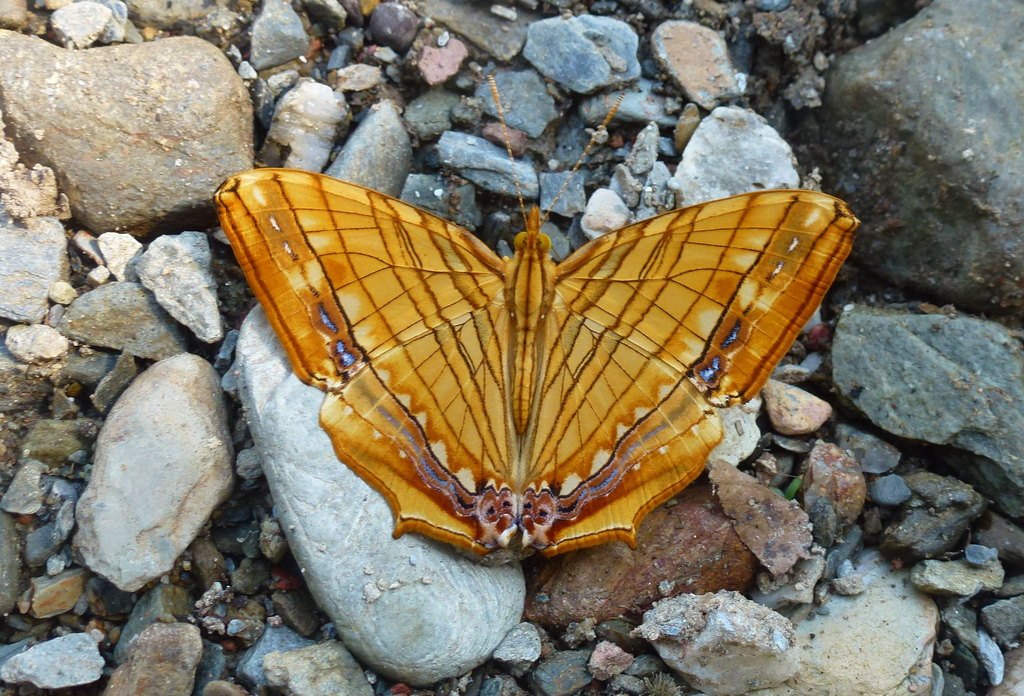
- Chersonesia risa

Scientific classification
- Kingdom: Animalia
- Phylum: Arthropoda
- Class: Insecta
- Order: Lepidoptera
- Family: Nymphalidae
- Subfamily: Cyrestinae
- Genus: Chersonesia; Distant, 1883

Species
- See text

= Chersonesia =

Genus of brush-footed butterflies

Chersonesia is an Indomalayan butterfly genus in the family Nymphalidae. The common name is maplet.

== Description ==
This genus is very close to the genus Cyrestis from which it differs by the venation of the forewing of which only the first subcostal vein originates before the end of the cell, the second originating between the apex of the cell and the base of the third subcostal vein.All Chersonesia have a rich yellow or orange ground-colour; the markings are black, consisting in the three well-known meridional stripes of which the basal and middle one are always double, whereas the third one, which is nearest the margin, is generally single (only two species having it double), not clearly defined and often widening out to a band; the other markings are a submarginal band formed of three components and adorned on the hindwing either by a blue ornamental line or in the majority of cases with a distinct ocellate chain, and finally a delicate marginal line.

== Taxonomy ==
The genus Chersonesia was described by William Lucas Distant in 1883. The name of this genus refers to the Malay Peninsula ( Chersonese )

== Species ==
- Chersonesia excellens (Martin, 1903)
- Chersonesia intermedia Martin, 1895
- Chersonesia nicevillei Martin, 1895
- Chersonesia peraka Distant, 1884
- Chersonesia rahria (Moore, [1858])
- Chersonesia rahrioides Moore, [1899]
- Chersonesia risa (Doubleday, [1848])
