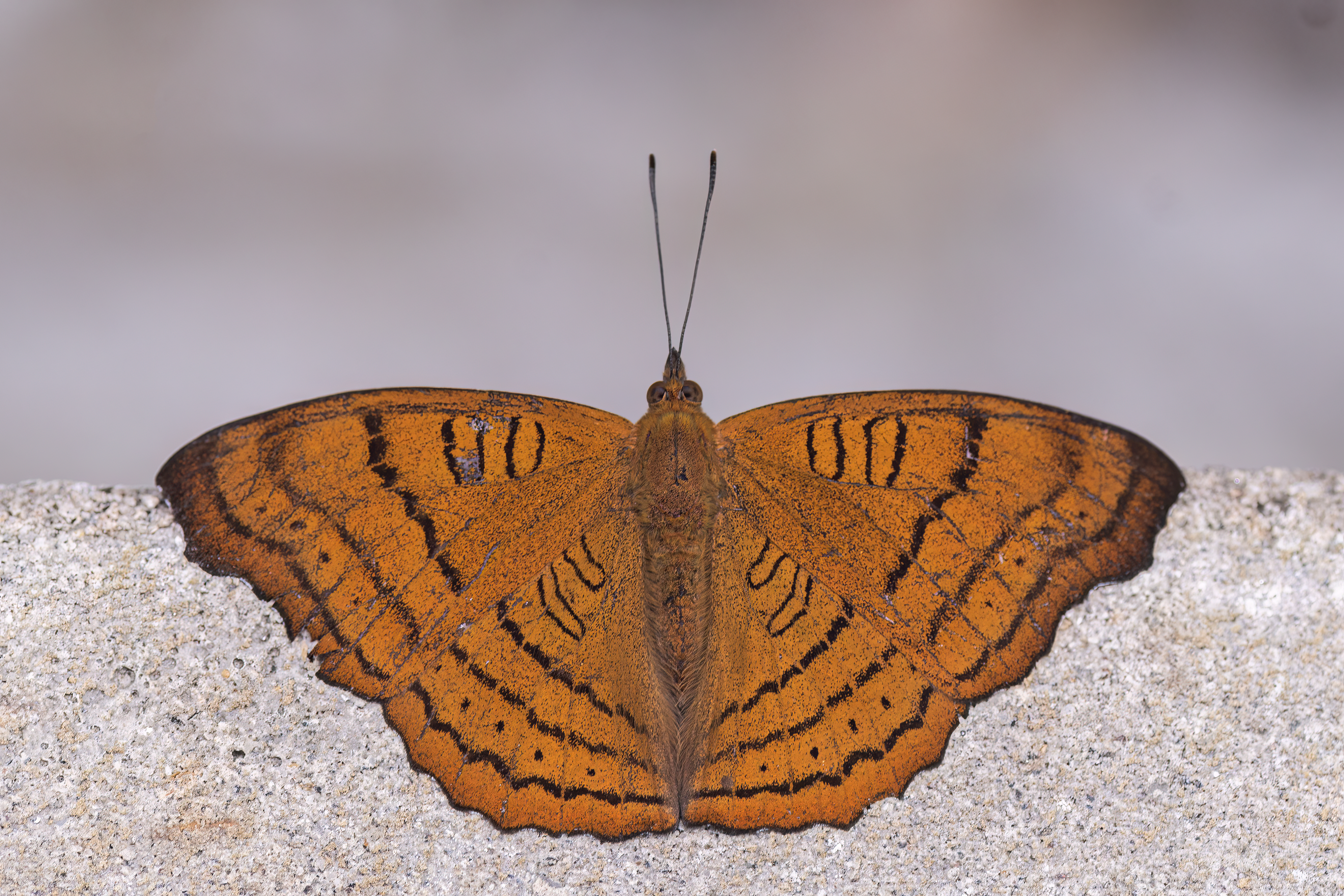

Scientific classification
- Kingdom: Animalia
- Phylum: Arthropoda
- Class: Insecta
- Order: Lepidoptera
- Family: Nymphalidae
- Genus: Pseudergolis
- Species: P. wedah

Binomial name
- Pseudergolis wedah (Kollar, 1848)

= Pseudergolis wedah =

Tabby

Species of butterfly

Pseudergolis wedah, the tabby, is a species of Nymphalid butterfly found in Asia. In India, it is found along the Himalayas where it is somewhat uncommon and extends into Southeast Asia east to Vietnam. It bears a resemblance to the Castor butterfly Ariadne merione which was formerly placed in the genus Ergolis.

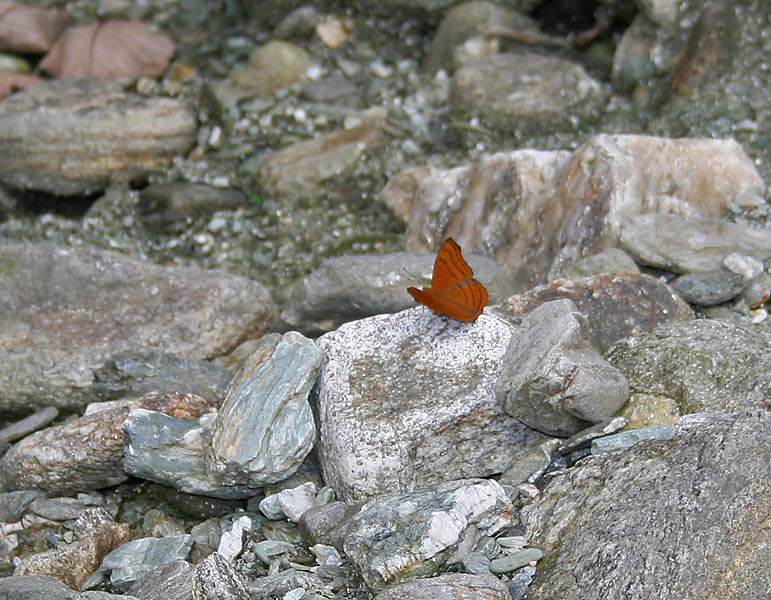

The genus is placed in the subfamily Pseudergolinae along with other genera such as Dichorragia, Stibochiona and Amnosia. The genus has two species, the other being avesta which is found in Sulawesi. The larval host plants belong to the family Urticaceae and include Debregeasia bicolor. The greenish larvae have a branched horn-like structure on the dark head.

== Subspecies ==
- Pseudergolis wedah wedah (north-western Himalayas to Sikkim, northern Burma, northern Indo-China, Yunnan)
- Pseudergolis wedah chinensis Fruhstorfer
