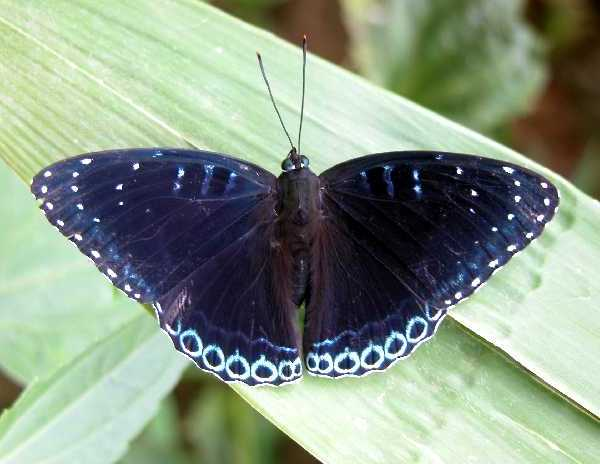

Scientific classification
- Kingdom: Animalia
- Phylum: Arthropoda
- Clade: Pancrustacea
- Class: Insecta
- Order: Lepidoptera
- Family: Nymphalidae
- Subfamily: Pseudergolinae
- Genus: Stibochiona
- Species: S. nicea

Binomial name
- Stibochiona nicea (Gray, 1846)

= Stibochiona nicea =

Popinjay

Species of butterfly

Stibochiona nicea, the popinjay, is a species of nymphalid butterfly found in Asia.

== Description ==
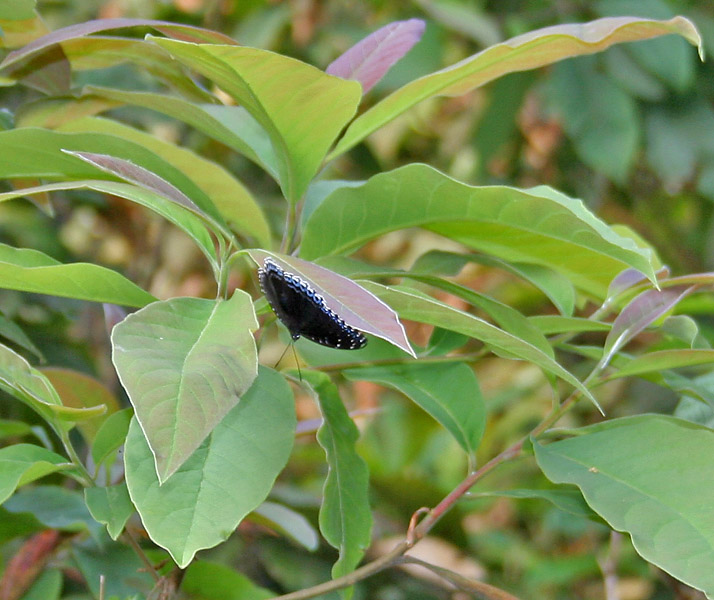
On Schima wallichii (chiloni or makri sal) at Samsing in Darjeeling district of West Bengal, India

The male upperside is a deep velvety black.

The forewing is a cell with three somewhat obscure light blue transverse short lines, a curved series of four discal and of five postdiscal white spots anteriorly, and a complete series of subterminal similar spots, bordered inwardly by a row of paired blue marks on each side of veins 1 to 6.

The hindwing is a postdiscal blue transverse sinuous line not reaching the costa or dorsum, followed by a subterminal series of blue circular marks with black centres, their rims outwardly white.

The cilia of both forewings and hindwings are white, alternating with black on the forewing, while continuous on the hindwing. The underside is purplish black.

On the forewing, the cell-marks better defined, the discal and postdiscal series of spots are sinuous, on each of seven spots; the subterminal row of spots is as on the upperside, but larger. The line of blue paired marks on the veins borders the subterminal row on the inner side above is absent. In the hindwing are three obliquely placed subbasal spots and a transverse sinuous line of discal spots blue, followed by a series of five or six postdiscal dots and a subterminal line of transverse inwardly crescentic bars lilacine white in the interspaces. The antennae, head, thorax and abdomen are black.

The female is similar, but on the upperside the ground colour is dull black suffused with green. The cell-markings and the inner subterminal paired spots on the forewing and the postdiscal sinuous band on the hindwing are metallic green. The underside ground colour is fuliginous black, while the markings are as in the male but larger.

== Gallery ==
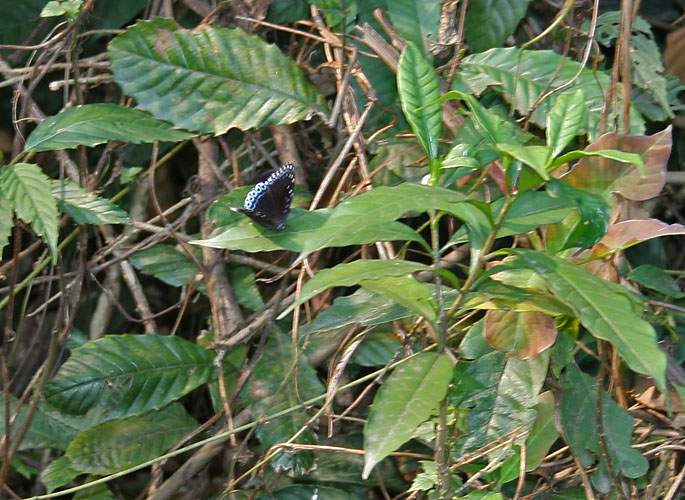
Basking at Samsing in Darjeeling district of West Bengal, India

== See also ==
- Nymphalidae
- List of butterflies of India
- List of butterflies of India (Nymphalidae)
