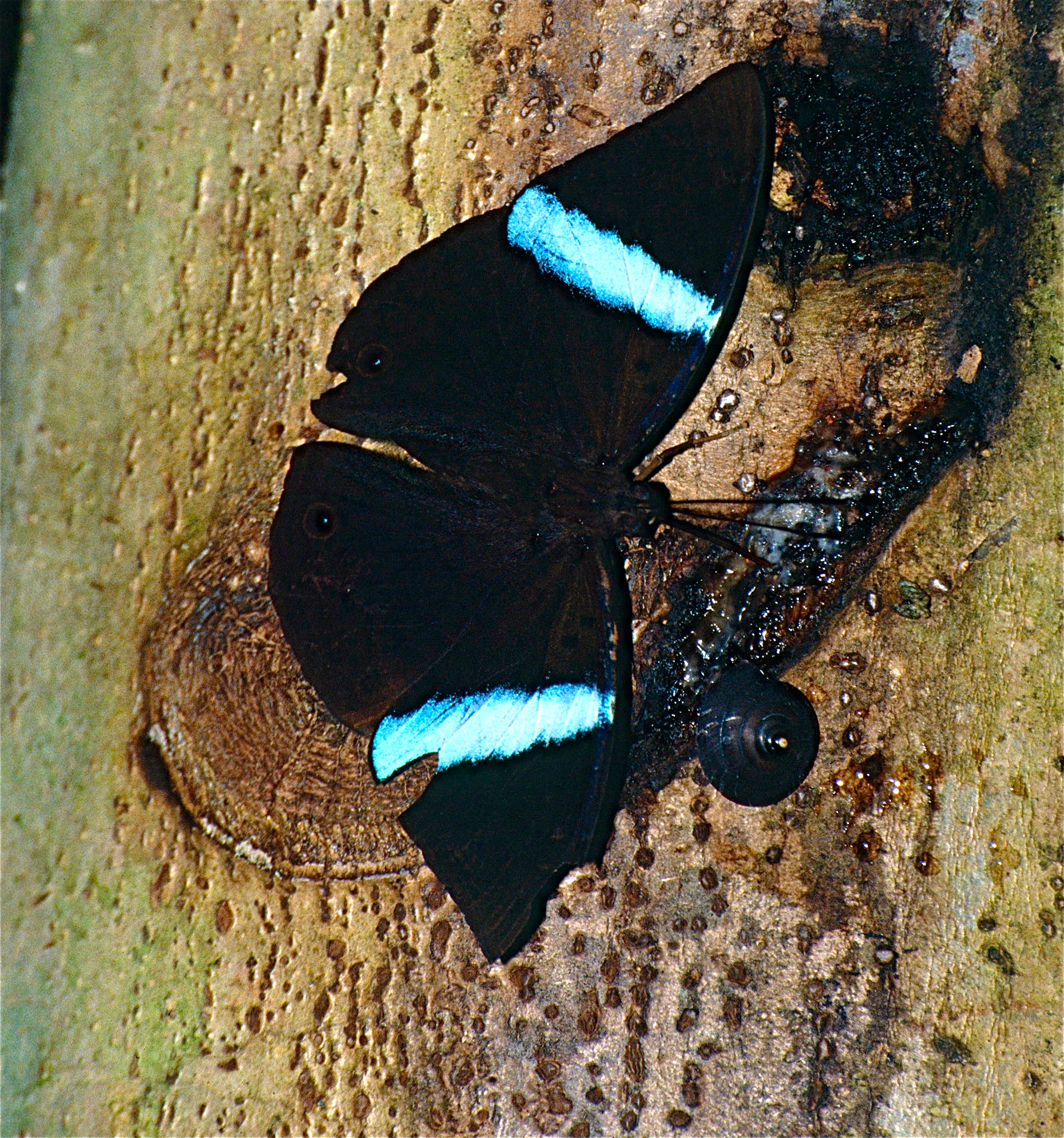
- Amnosia decora feeding on exuding sap in company of a snail

Scientific classification
- Kingdom: Animalia
- Phylum: Arthropoda
- Class: Insecta
- Order: Lepidoptera
- Family: Nymphalidae
- Subfamily: Pseudergolinae
- Genus: Amnosia; Doubleday, 1849
- Species: A. decora

Binomial name
- Amnosia decora Doubleday, [1849]

= Amnosia =

Species of butterfly

Amnosia decora, the Ninja, is a butterfly of the family Nymphalidae (Pseudergolinae). It is found in the Indomalayan realm. It is the sole member of the monotypic genus Amnosia.

== Subspecies ==
- Amnosia decora decora
- Amnosia decora baluana Fruhstorfer, 1894 Borneo
- Amnosia decora petronia Fruhstorfer, 1908 Borneo
- Amnosia decora martini Honrath, 1892 Borneo
- Amnosia decora endamia Grose-Smith Sumatra
- Amnosia decora decorina Fruhstorfer, 1894 Nias
- Amnosia decora perakana Fruhstorfer, 1908 Peninsular Malaya

== Biology ==
Amnosia decora is found in lowland rain forest.
