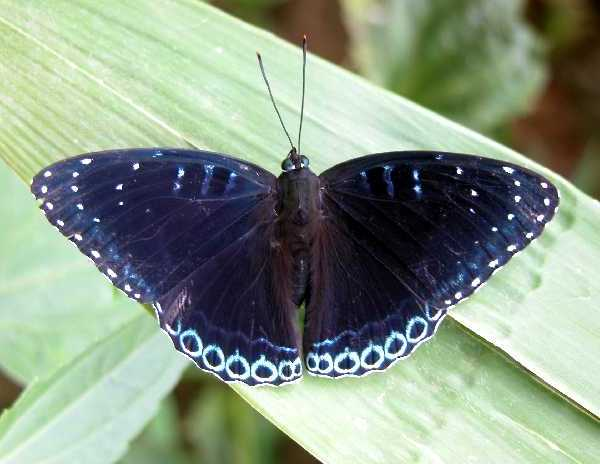
- Popinjay (Stibochiona nicea)

Scientific classification
- Kingdom: Animalia
- Phylum: Arthropoda
- Class: Insecta
- Order: Lepidoptera
- Family: Nymphalidae
- Subfamily: Pseudergolinae; Jordan, 1898

= Pseudergolinae =

Subfamily of butterflies

Pseudergolinae is a small subfamily of nymphalid brush-footed butterflies. It is considered to include only seven species in four genera distributed mainly in the Oriental region.

== Systematics ==
The circumscription of Pseudergolinae has seen some changes in the recent years, when it was first suggested that the tribes Cyrestini and Pseudergolini formed a monophyletic clade with subfamily status under the name Cyrestinae, but then the tribes were split again—with subfamily status—as their positions within the Nymphalidae were defined more clearly. It is now considered to be the sister group to the larger nymphaline clade, which includes the Nymphalinae, Cyrestinae, Apaturinae and Biblidinae.

Four genera are recognized in the subfamily:

- Amnosia
- Pseudergolis
- Stibochiona
- Dichorragia
