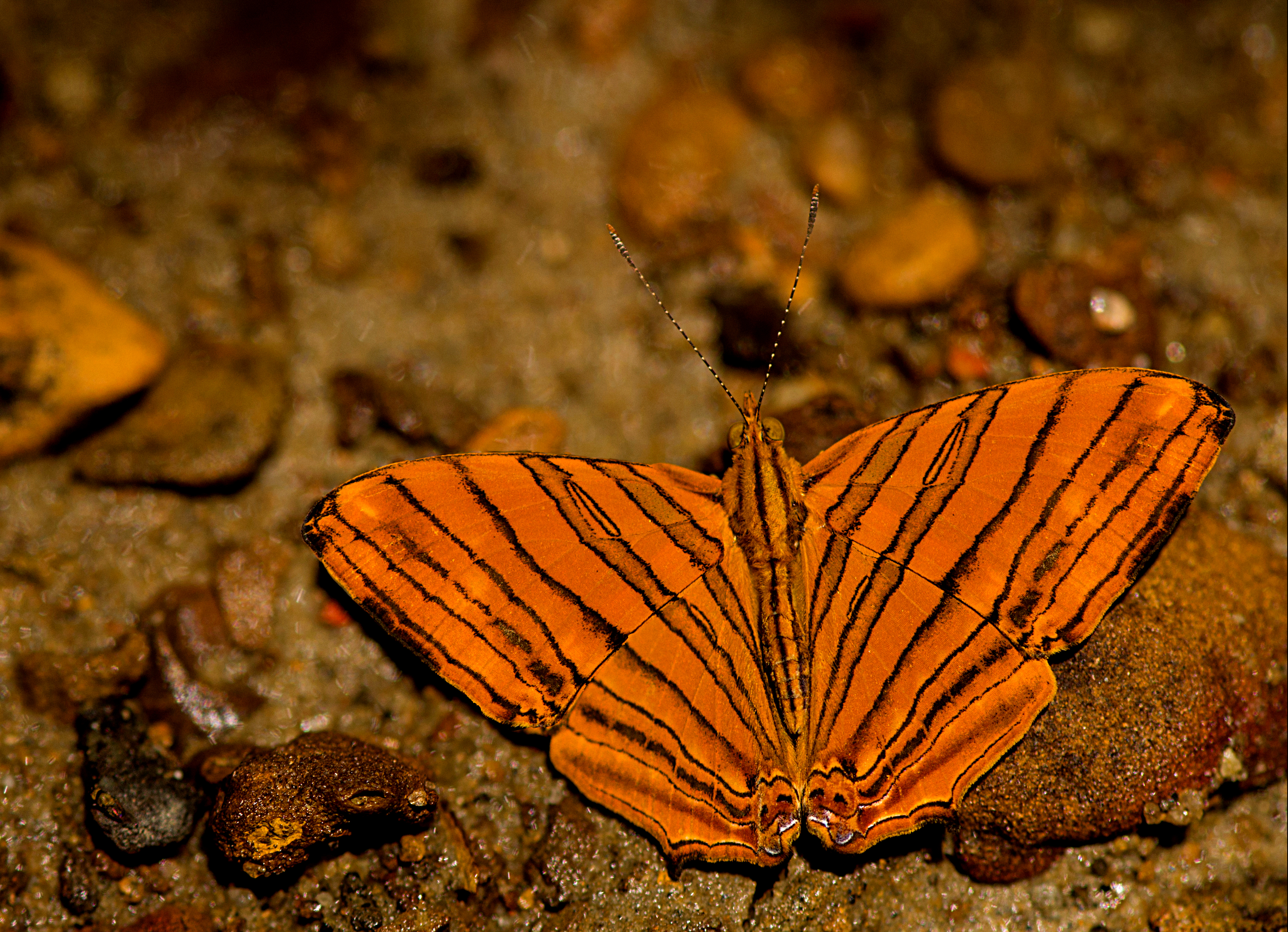

Scientific classification
- Domain: Eukaryota
- Kingdom: Animalia
- Phylum: Arthropoda
- Class: Insecta
- Order: Lepidoptera
- Family: Nymphalidae
- Genus: Chersonesia
- Species: C. risa

Binomial name
- Chersonesia risa (Doubleday, [1848])

Synonyms
- Cyrestis risa Doubleday, [1848]; Cyrestis cyanee de Nicéville, [1893]

= Chersonesia risa =

Common maplet

Species of butterfly

Chersonesia risa, the common maplet, is a butterfly of the family Nymphalidae. It is found in South-East Asia.

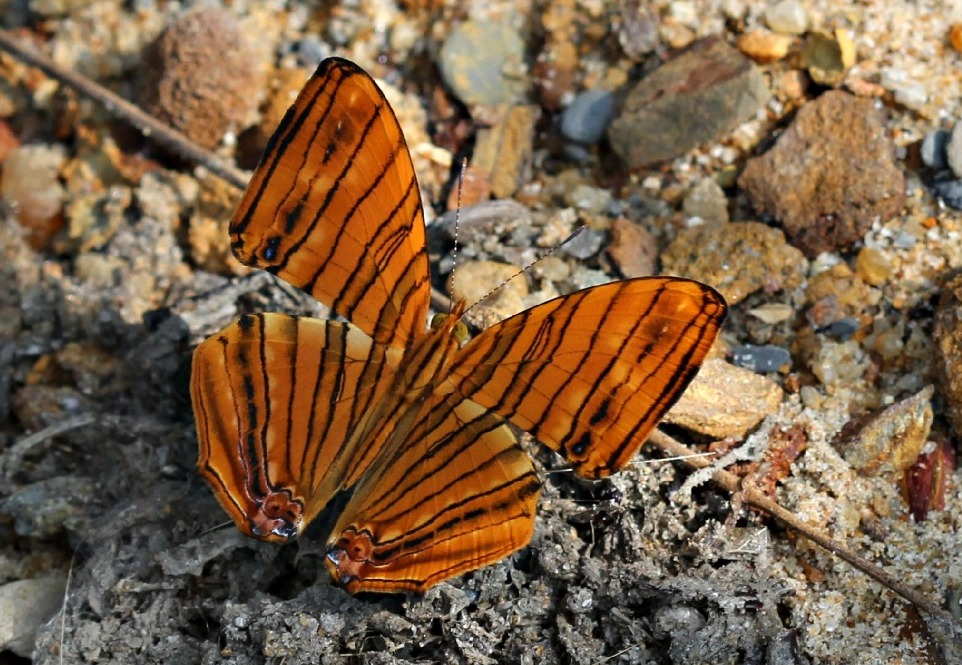
Common maplet

== Subspecies ==
- Chersonesia risa risa (Assam to Peninsular Malaya)
- Chersonesia risa transies (Martin, 1903) (northern Indo-China and possibly China)
- Chersonesia risa cyanee (de Nicéville, [1893]) (Borneo)
