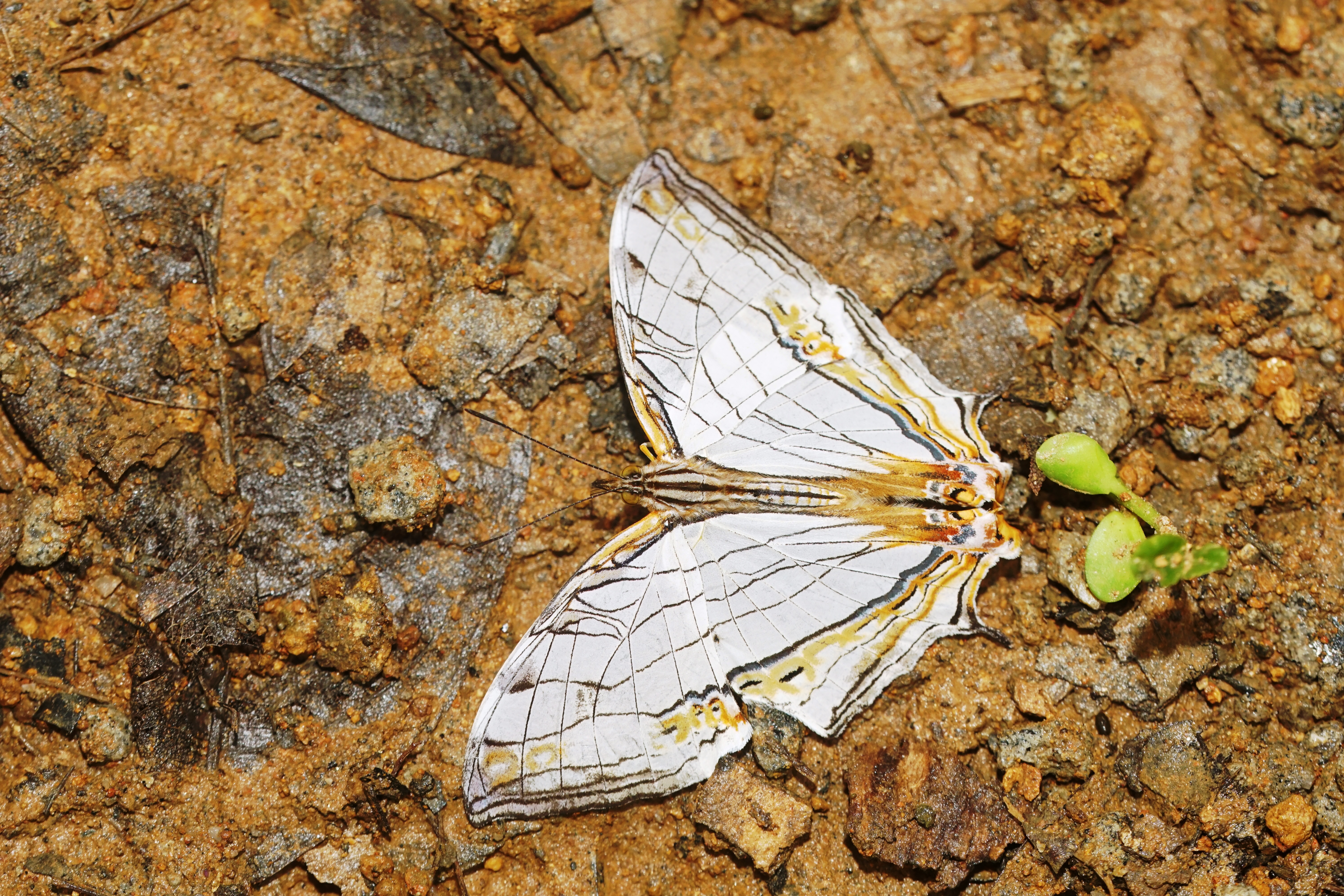
- Cyrestis thyodamas

Scientific classification
- Domain: Eukaryota
- Kingdom: Animalia
- Phylum: Arthropoda
- Class: Insecta
- Order: Lepidoptera
- Family: Nymphalidae
- Subfamily: Cyrestinae; Guenée, 1865

= Cyrestinae =

Subfamily of butterfly family Nymphalidae

Cyrestinae is a small subfamily of nymphalid brush-footed butterflies. It is considered to include only three genera – Marpesia, Chersonesia, and Cyrestis – distributed in the tropics.

== Systematics ==
The circumscription of the Cyrestinae has seen some changes in the recent years, when the former tribes Cyrestini and Pseudergolini were suggested to form a monophyletic clade, and the name was given to the proposed new subfamily, but the tribes were split again later—as two independent subfamilies—as their positions within the Nymphalidae were defined more clearly. It is now considered to be the sister group to the larger subfamily Nymphalinae, and only three genera are included:

- Cyrestis
- Chersonesia
- Marpesia

Marpesia is Neotropical and Cyrestis and Chersonesia are mainly Oriental with a few species in the Afrotropics.
