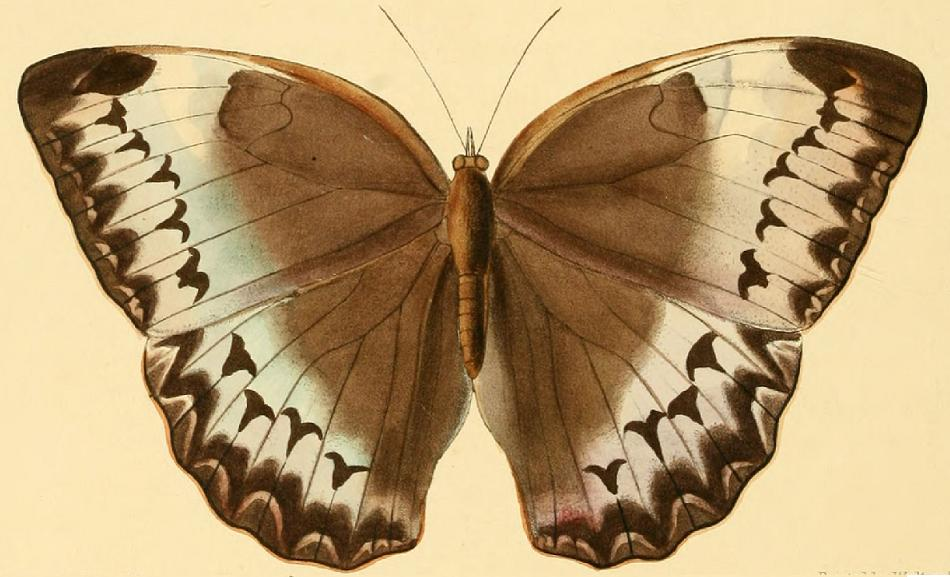

Scientific classification
- Domain: Eukaryota
- Kingdom: Animalia
- Phylum: Arthropoda
- Class: Insecta
- Order: Lepidoptera
- Family: Nymphalidae
- Genus: Stichophthalma
- Species: S. cambodia

Binomial name
- Stichophthalma cambodia (Hewitson, 1862)

Synonyms
- Thaumantis cambodia Hewitson, 1862

= Stichophthalma cambodia =

Species of butterfly

Stichophthalma cambodia is a butterfly of the family Nymphalidae. It is found in Cambodia, Thailand and Indochina.
