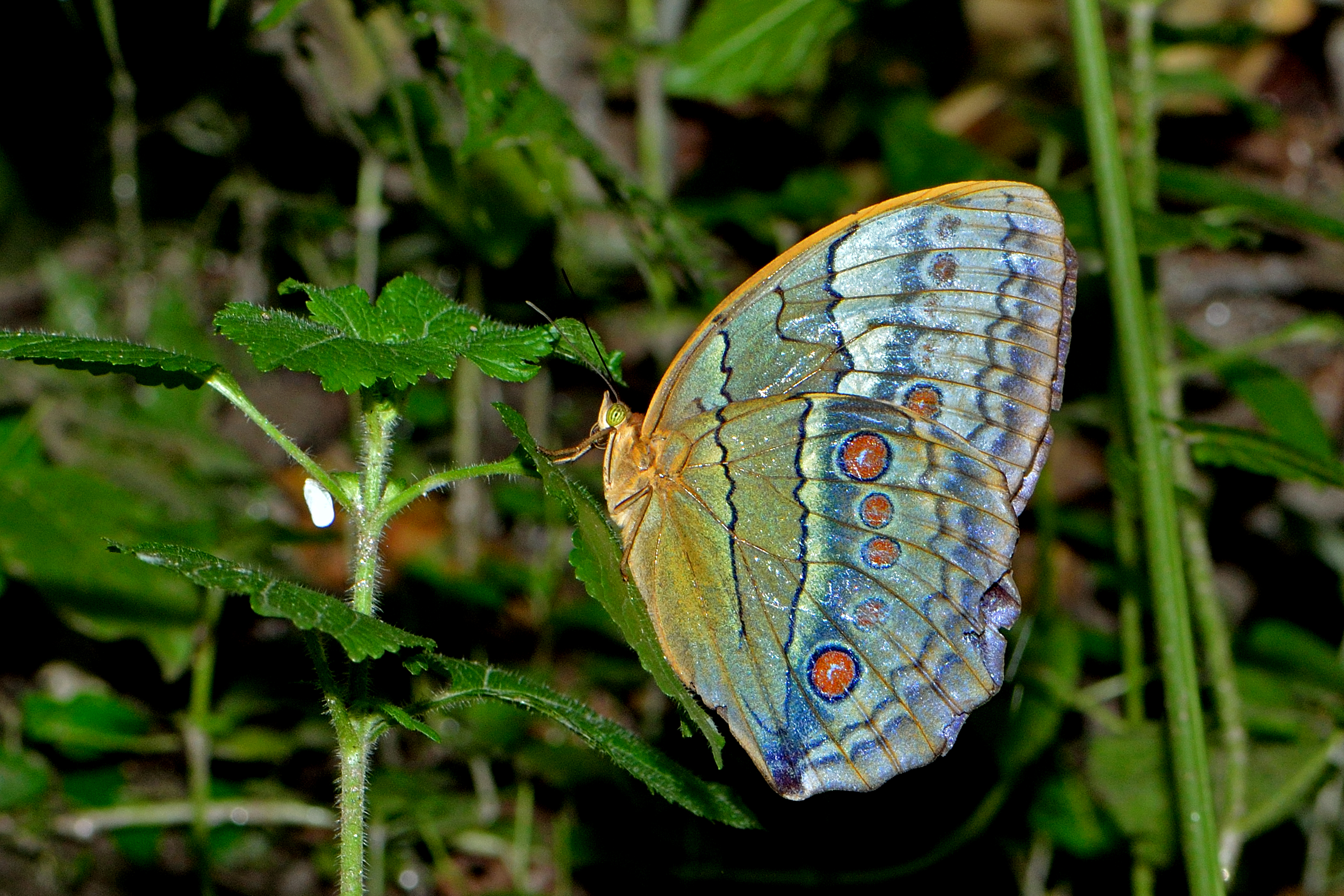
- Ventral view
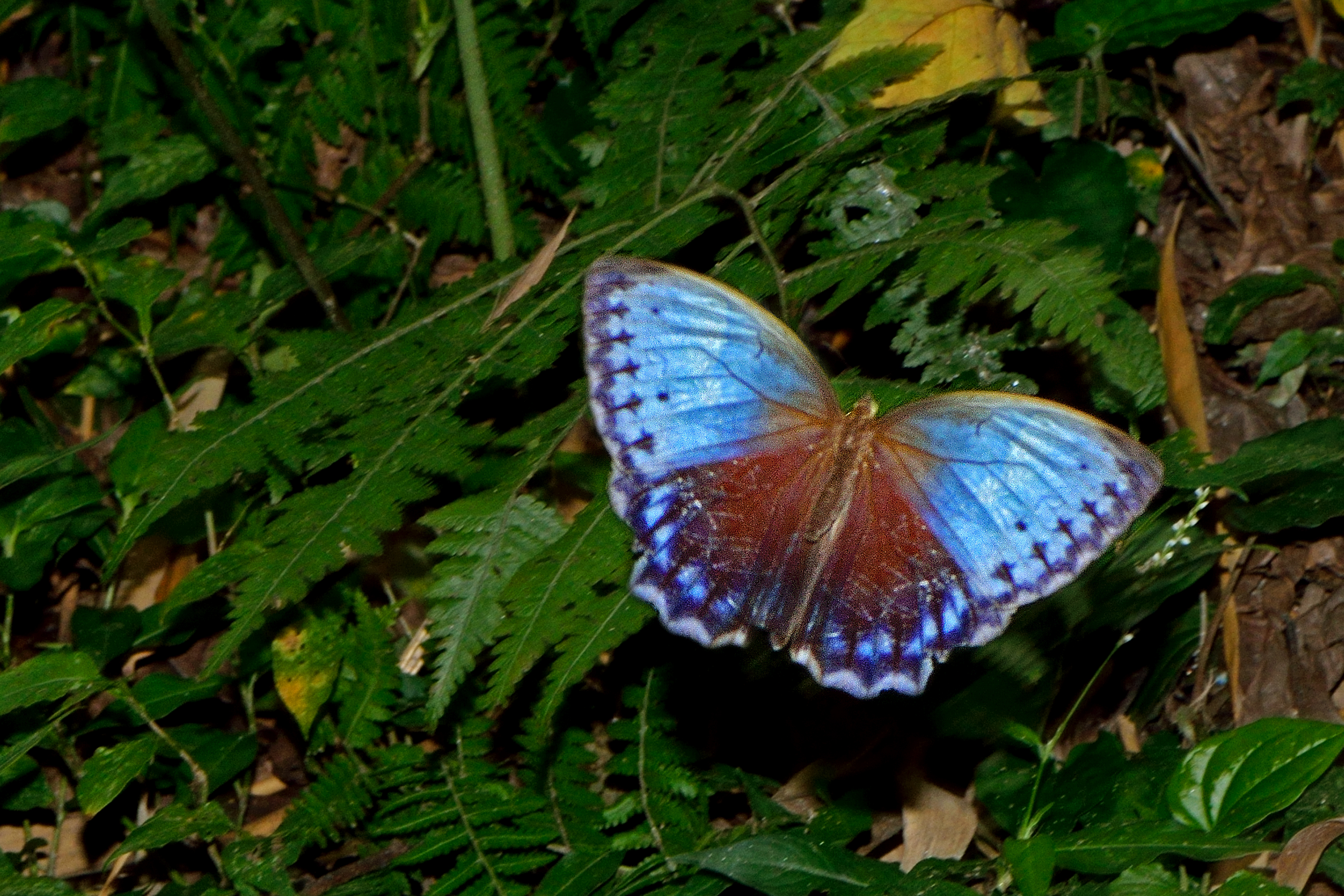
- Dorsal view

Scientific classification
- Kingdom: Animalia
- Phylum: Arthropoda
- Clade: Pancrustacea
- Class: Insecta
- Order: Lepidoptera
- Family: Nymphalidae
- Genus: Stichophthalma
- Species: S. camadeva

Binomial name
- Stichophthalma camadeva (Westwood, 1848)

= Stichophthalma camadeva =

Northern jungle queen

Species of butterfly

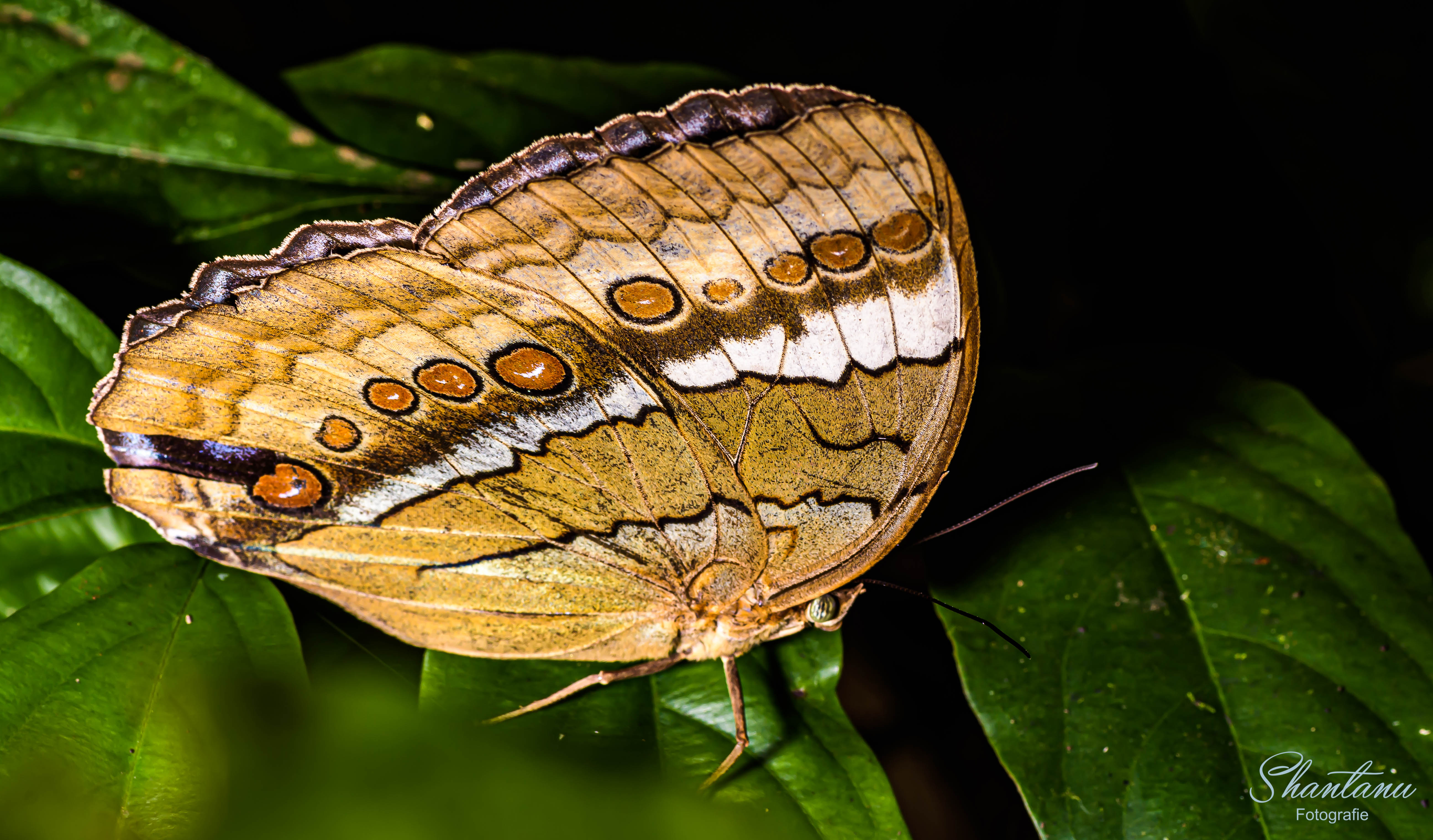
Jungle Queen Stichophthalma camadeva

Stichophthalma camadeva, the northern jungle queen, is a butterfly found in South Asia that belongs to the Morphinae subfamily of the brush-footed butterflies family.

== Distribution ==
The northern jungle queen ranges from Sikkim, north Bengal, Assam, Manipur, and Nagaland in India. It is also found in the Arakan hills and northern part of Myanmar. It is also found in Thailand

== Status ==
Evans reports the butterfly as not rare in Sikkim and Assam and as very rare in the Naga Hills. Haribal reports the butterfly as rare in Sikkim.

== Description ==
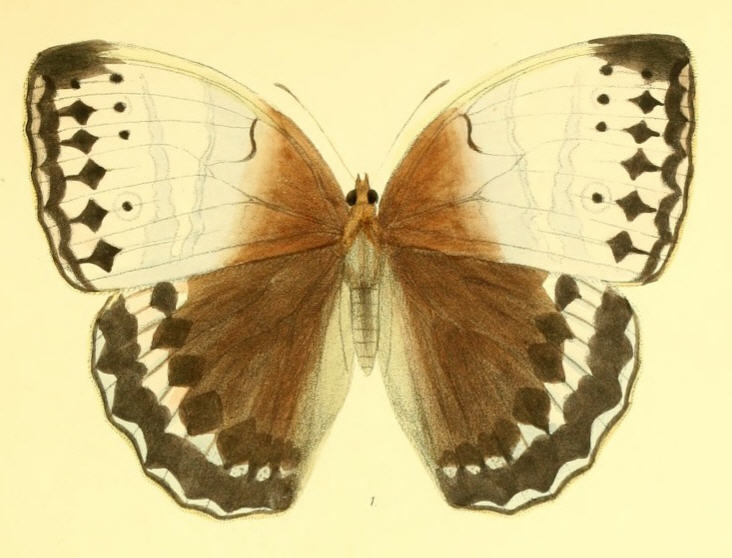

Upperside of males and females: forewing with basal third chocolate brown, shading into pale bluish white on the rest of the wing; a broad, irregular, pure white discal bar bounded on each side by sinuous pale blue lines; a series of two or three large postdiscal brownish spots, succeeded by a series of quadrate dark brown spots touching an outer series of broad lunules of the same colour; finally a subterminal row of narrow whitish crescentic marks and a terminal dark brown line. Hindwing dark chocolate brown, paler towards base; a broad postdiscal, bluish-white, curved band formed of paired, large, inwardly angular spots in the interspaces followed by a continuous series of broad brown lunules, a subterminal row of narrow crescentic white marks, and a terminal brown hue. Underside ochraceous, irrorated (sprinkled) with greenish scales on the basal area of the wings and on the discal bar of the hindwing; forewings and hindwings crossed by subbasal and discal, transverse, sinuous, dark brown lines, followed by a straw-coloured discal bar, a brownish diffuse band, very dark ochraceous series of partly ocelli and partly obscure spots, and a postdiscal outer, broad, diffuse dark brown band, ending posteriorly in a black spot at the tornus of the hindwing. Antennae, head, thorax and abdomen chocolate brown.

== See also ==
- List of butterflies of India
- List of butterflies of India (Morphinae)
- List of butterflies of India (Nymphalidae)
