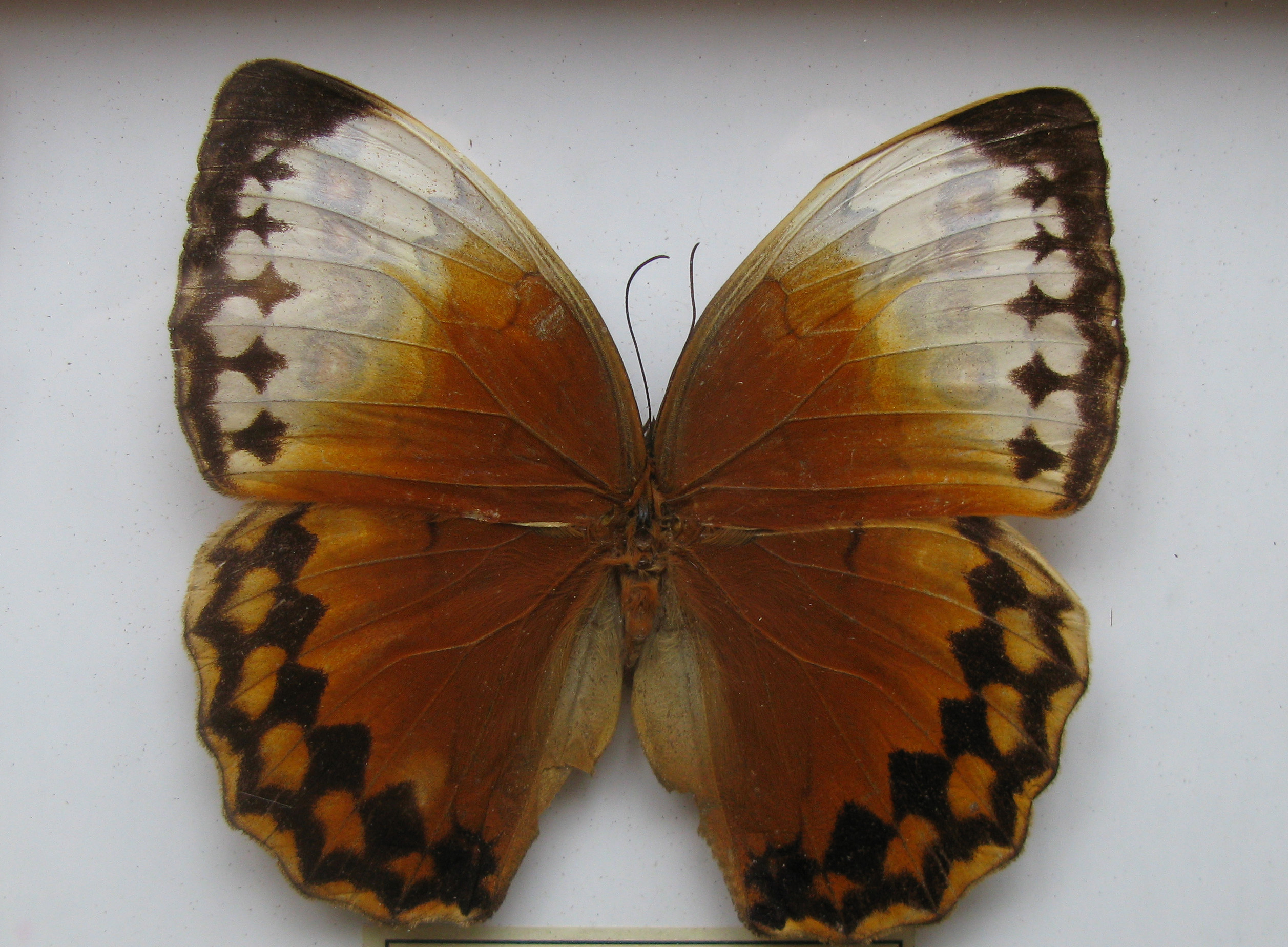

Scientific classification
- Domain: Eukaryota
- Kingdom: Animalia
- Phylum: Arthropoda
- Class: Insecta
- Order: Lepidoptera
- Family: Nymphalidae
- Genus: Stichophthalma
- Species: S. louisa

Binomial name
- Stichophthalma louisa Wood-Mason, 1877

Synonyms
- Stichophthalma mathilda Janet, 1905

= Stichophthalma louisa =

Species of butterfly

Stichophthalma louisa is a species of butterfly in the family Nymphalidae. It is found in Asia.

== Subspecies ==
- Stichophthalma louisa louisa
- Stichophthalma louisa eamesi Monastyrskii, Devyatkin & Uemura, 2000
- Stichophthalma louisa mathilda Janet, 1905 (southern Yunnan)
- Stichophthalma louisa ranohngensis Okano, 1985
- Stichophthalma louisa siamensis Rothschild, 1916
- Stichophthalma louisa tytleri Rothschild, 1918
