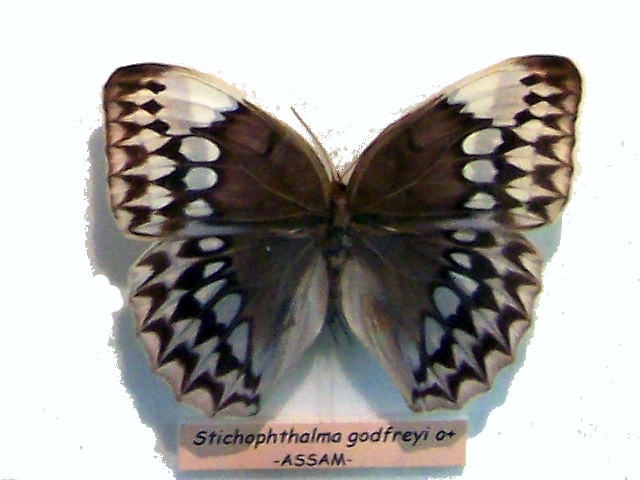

Scientific classification
- Domain: Eukaryota
- Kingdom: Animalia
- Phylum: Arthropoda
- Class: Insecta
- Order: Lepidoptera
- Family: Nymphalidae
- Genus: Stichophthalma
- Species: S. godfreyi

Binomial name
- Stichophthalma godfreyi Rothschild, 1916

= Stichophthalma godfreyi =

Species of butterfly

Stichophthalma godfreyi is a butterfly of the family Nymphalidae. It is found in scattered areas in South-East Asia, including Burma and Thailand.

The wingspan is 90–180 mm.
