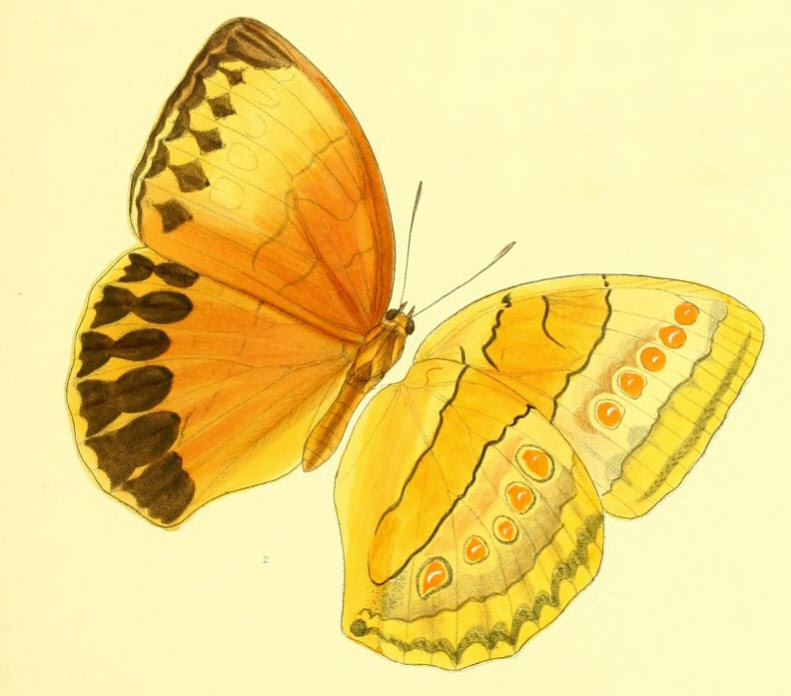

Scientific classification
- Kingdom: Animalia
- Phylum: Arthropoda
- Class: Insecta
- Order: Lepidoptera
- Family: Nymphalidae
- Genus: Stichophthalma
- Species: S. sparta

Binomial name
- Stichophthalma sparta de Nicéville, 1889

= Stichophthalma sparta =

Species of butterfly

Stichophthalma sparta, the Manipur jungle queen, is a butterfly found in South Asia that belongs to the Morphinae subfamily of the brush-footed butterflies family.

== Distribution ==
The Manipur jungle queen ranges from Assam (Abor Hills), Nagaland, Manipur across Myanmar (Kindat and Katha in the north; Htawgaw and Sadon in the north-east of the country, and Gokteik in the northern Shan states) onto northern Yunnan in China.

== Status ==
Evans reports the butterfly as not rare in Sikkim and Assam and as very rare in the Naga Hills. Haribal reports the butterfly as rare in Sikkim.

== Description ==
Upperside of both males and females ochraceous yellow suffused with a darker, somewhat brownish shade of the same towards base of forewing and on hindwing. Forewing has a postdiscal transverse row of fleur-de-lys-shaped spots, a subterminal series of broad black lunules, followed by a series of narrow crescentic marks of the ochraceous ground colour; apex and a terminal line black. Hindwing has a subterminal series of black lunules as on the forewing, giving out inwards a series of large, shafted, roundly lanceolate marks of the same colour, followed, as on the forewing, by narrow ochraceous crescentic marks and a terminal black line, the marks posteriorly rather diffuse and tending to run together. Underside ochraceous yellow, with the following transverse markings: subbasal, median, postdiscal, sub terminal and terminal dark brown sinuous lines; a discal row of dark ochraceous ocelli, six on forewing, five on hindwing: and, bordering the ocelli on the inner side, a variable diffuse dusky-black band, ending posteriorly on the hindwing in a black tornal spot. Antennae dark brown; head, thorax and abdomen ochraceous, abdomen paler beneath.

Female upperside is similar, the black markings broader and heavier. Underside also similar, but the ground colour a beautiful pale green with a silky lustre, the median transverse dark brown line outwardly bordered from costa of forewing to vein 1 of hindwing with greenish white; the dusky-black transversely discal band broader and more diffuse: forewing with seven ocelli; terminal margins broadly but lightly infuscated.

== See also ==
- List of butterflies of India
- List of butterflies of India (Morphinae)
- List of butterflies of India (Nymphalidae)
