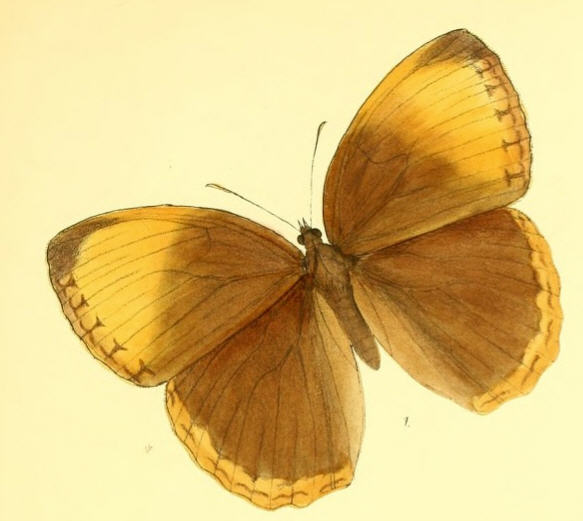

Scientific classification
- Kingdom: Animalia
- Phylum: Arthropoda
- Clade: Pancrustacea
- Class: Insecta
- Order: Lepidoptera
- Family: Nymphalidae
- Genus: Stichophthalma
- Species: S. nourmahal

Binomial name
- Stichophthalma nourmahal (Westwood, 1851)

= Stichophthalma nourmahal =

Chocolate jungle queen

Species of butterfly

Stichophthalma nourmahal (the chocolate jungle queen), is a South Asian butterfly that belongs to the Morphinae subfamily of the brush-footed butterflies family.

== Distribution ==
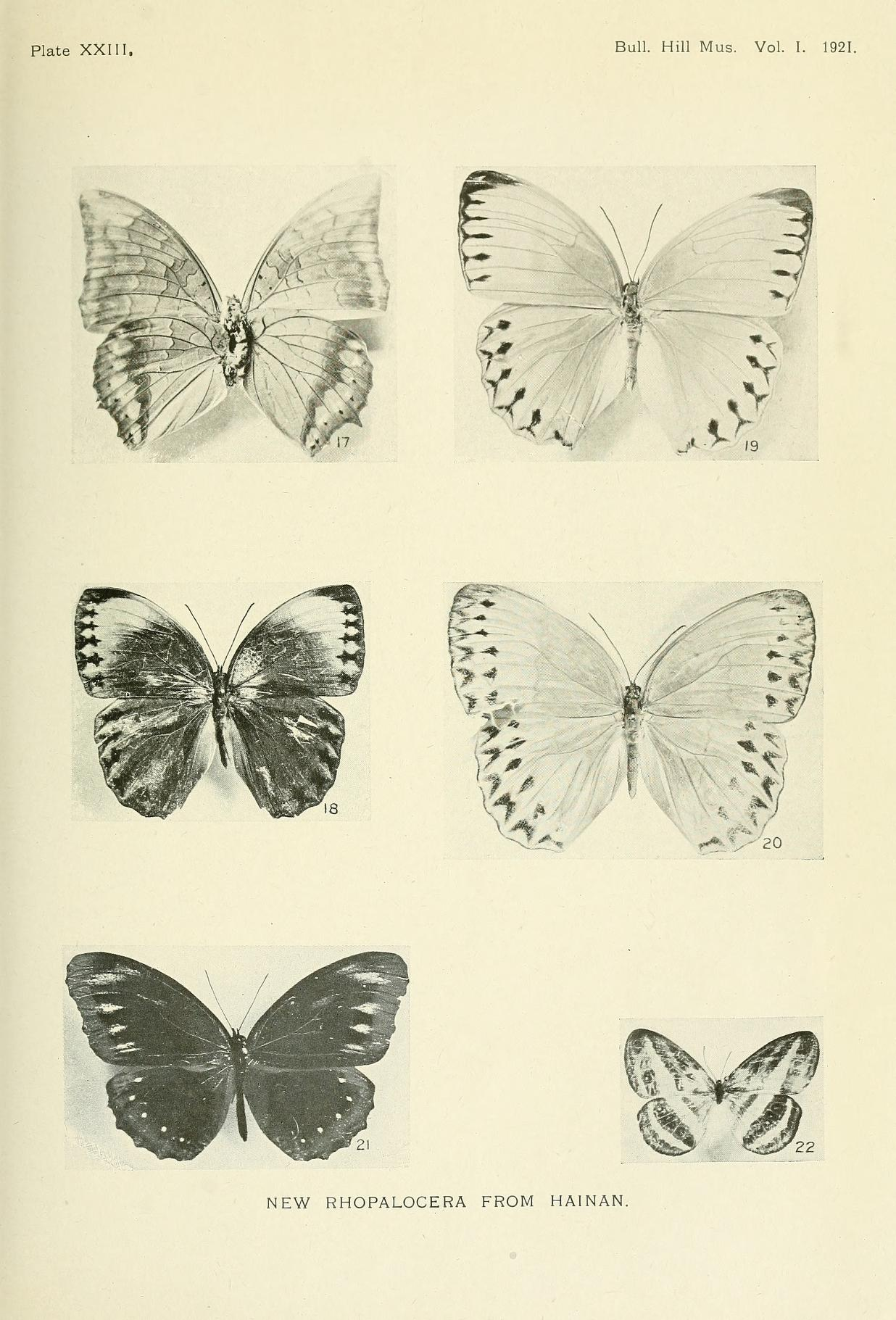
Figure 18

The chocolate jungle queen ranges from Sikkim, Assam and Nagaland in India and also in Bhutan.

== Status ==
Evans and Haribal report the butterfly as rare over its range.

== Description ==
The male upperside is bright chocolate brown. Its forewing has a broad, curved, oblique preapical band from costa to termen. Its apex and termen are dark brown with a subterminal series of delicate, brown, trident-shaped marks. The hindwing hosts a yellow band along the terminal margin, bearing paired, lunular, brown marks in the interspaces. Its underside is dark ochraceous, paler towards the apex of the forewing, with transverse markings: subbasal and median dark brown sinuous lines, bordered, the former on the inside, the latter on the outside, by narrow bands of greenish blue; a discal series of obscure ocelli, some of them pale spots; a postdiscal and a subterminal dark highly-sinuous line, the former ending in a black tornal spot outwardly margined with pink. The antennae, head, thorax and abdomen are chocolate brown above, ochraceous beneath.

The female upperside is similar, with a preapical white spot on forewing. The underside has similar transverse markings. The ground colour up to the median black transverse line is chocolate-brown; beyond, the forewing from costa to vein 4 is light ochraceous, inwardly paling to white below vein 1; the hindwing is crossed by a diffuse dark brown band; ocelli as in the male, followed by a dull ochraceous-brown postdiscal area. The terminal margins are broadly brown, inwardly defined and crossed subterminally by sinuous dark lines. The antennae, head, thorax and abdomen are as in the male.
