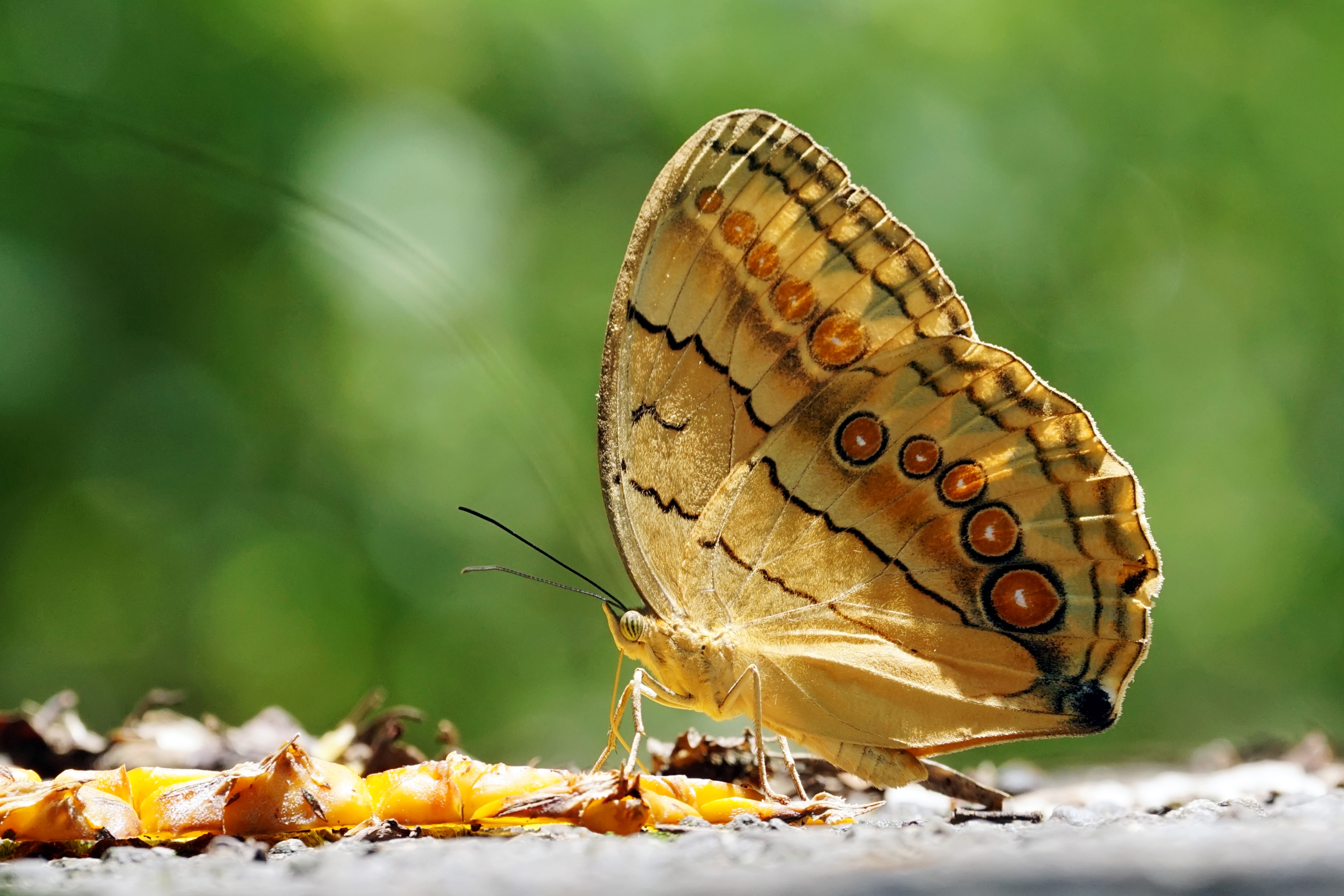

Scientific classification
- Kingdom: Animalia
- Phylum: Arthropoda
- Class: Insecta
- Order: Lepidoptera
- Family: Nymphalidae
- Genus: Stichophthalma
- Species: S. howqua

Binomial name
- Stichophthalma howqua (Westwood, 1851)

Synonyms
- Thaumantis howqua Westwood, 1851

= Stichophthalma howqua =

Species of butterfly

Stichophthalma howqua is a species of butterfly in genus Stichophthalma. It was described by John O. Westwood in 1851, and its subspecies can be found in Southeast Asia and China.

== Subspecies ==
- Stichophthalma howqua howqua
- Stichophthalma howqua iapetus Brooks, 1949 (southern Vietnam)
- Stichophthalma howqua tonkiniana Fruhstorfer, 1901 (northern Vietnam)
- Stichophthalma howqua formosana Fruhstorfer, 1908 (Taiwan)
- Stichophthalma howqua miyana Fruhstorfer, 1913 (Canton)
- Stichophthalma howqua suffusa Leech, 1892 (Sichuan, Fujian)
- Stichophthalma howqua bowringi Chun, 1929 (Hainan)

=== Subspecies gallery ===
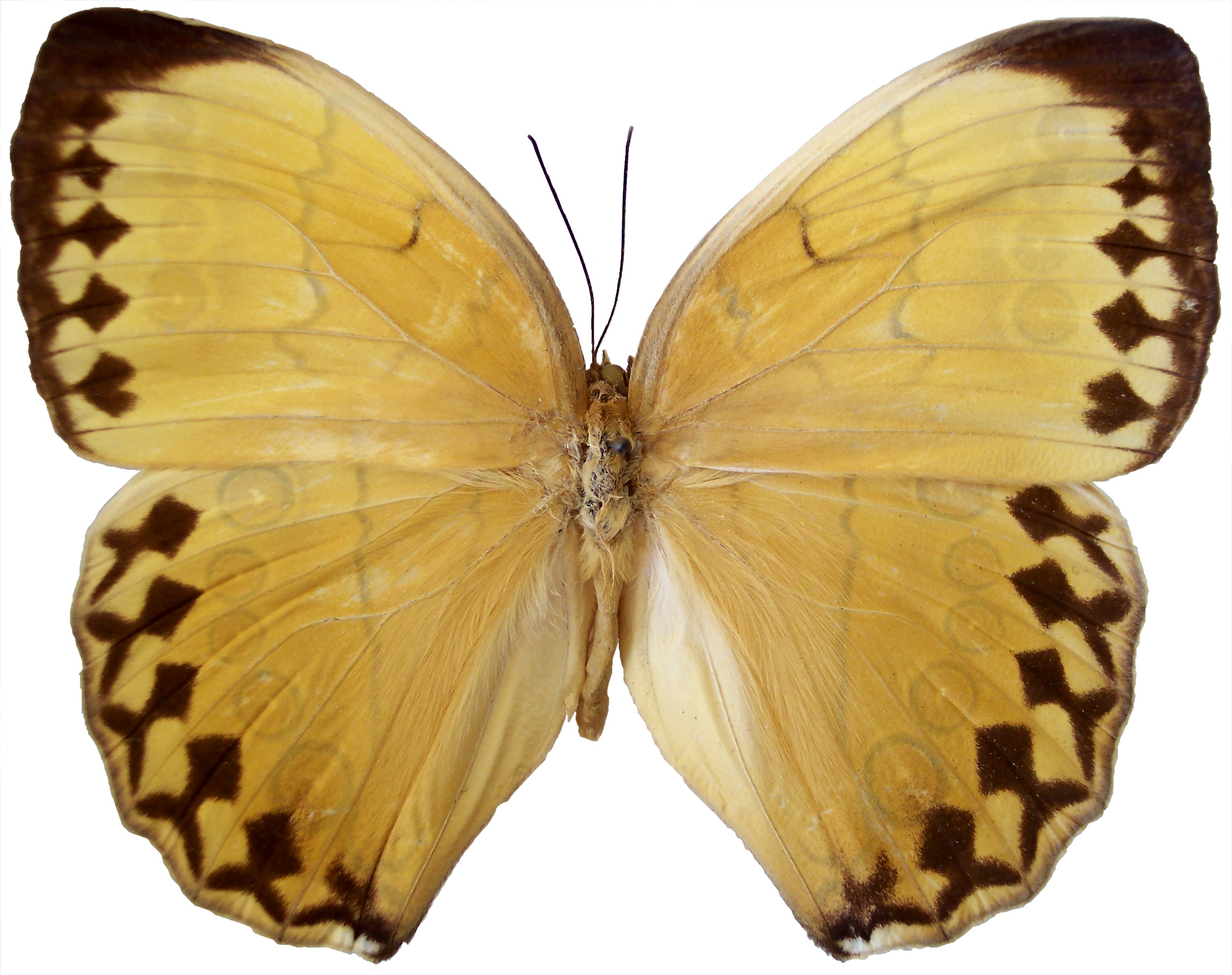
S. h. formosana male - dorsal view - Taiwan

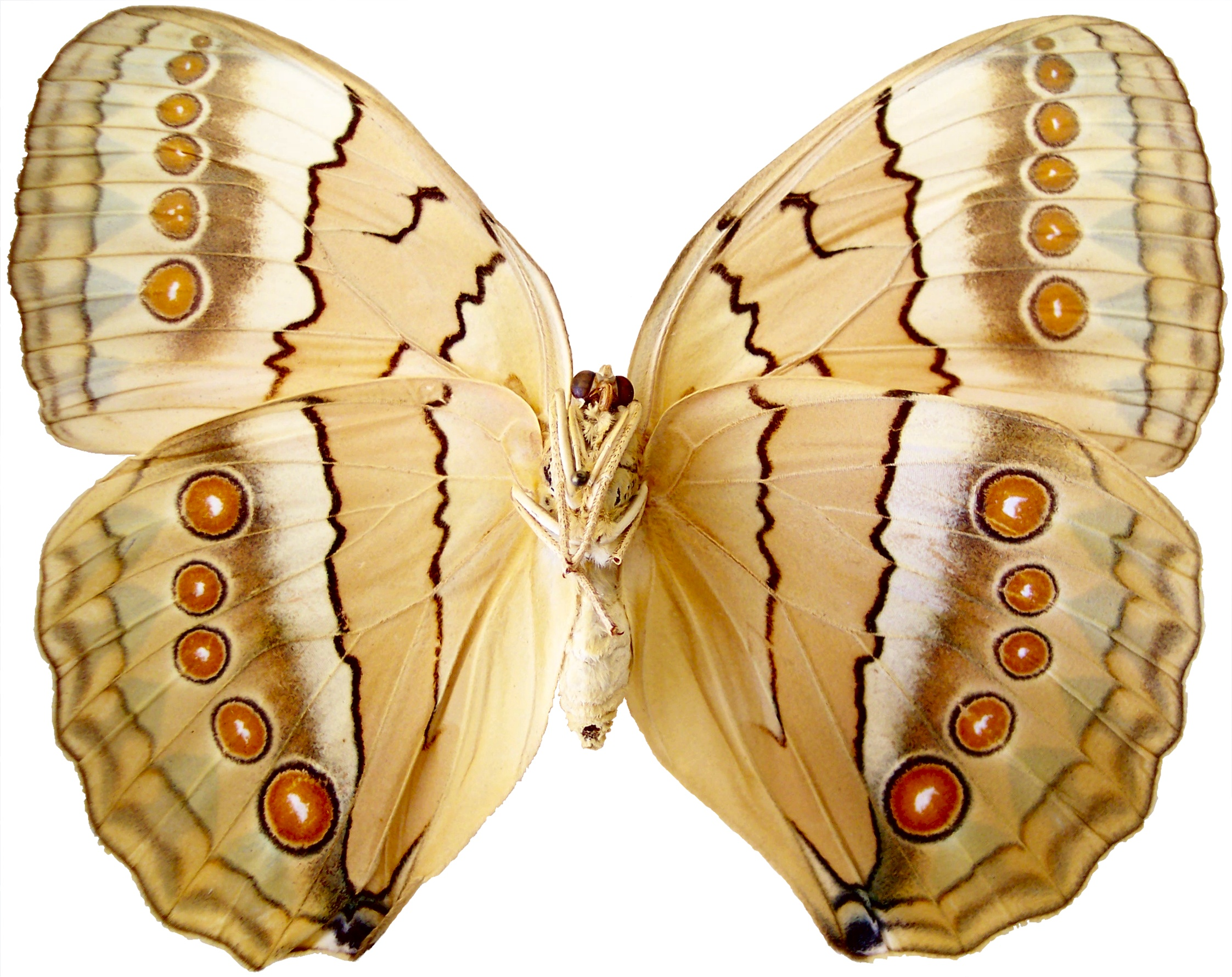
S. h. formosana female - ventral view - Taiwan

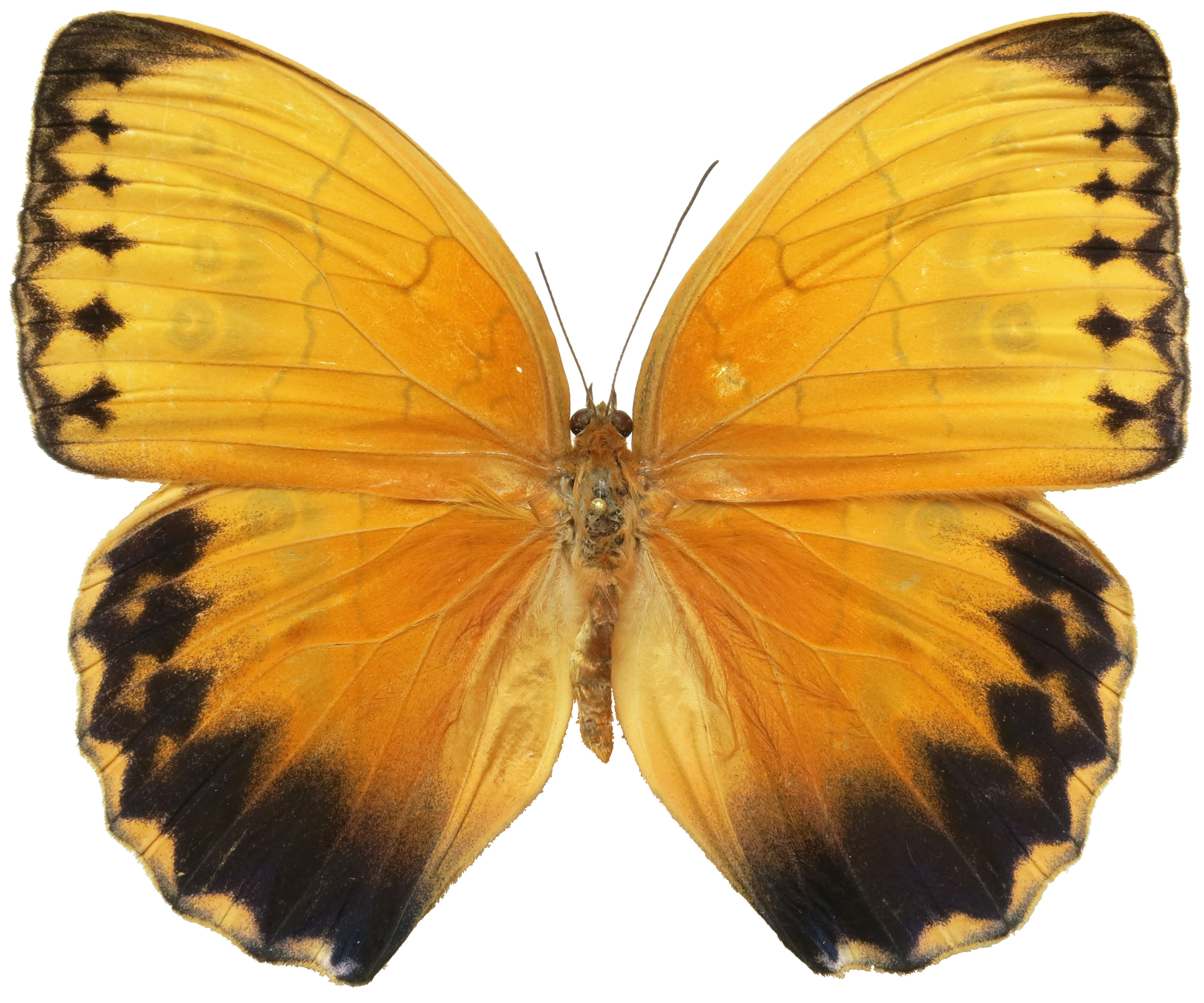
S. h. suffusa male - dorsal view - Ya'an, Sichuan, China
