= Stichophthalma =

- Stichophthalma camadeva figure 2

Scientific classification
- Kingdom: Animalia
- Phylum: Arthropoda
- Clade: Pancrustacea
- Class: Insecta
- Order: Lepidoptera
- Family: Nymphalidae
- Subfamily: Morphinae
- Tribe: Amathusiini
- Genus: Stichophthalma; C. & R. Felder, 1862

Genus of brush-footed butterflies

Stichophthalma is a genus of butterflies in the family Nymphalidae called jungle queens. The members are confined to India, China and Southeast Asia.

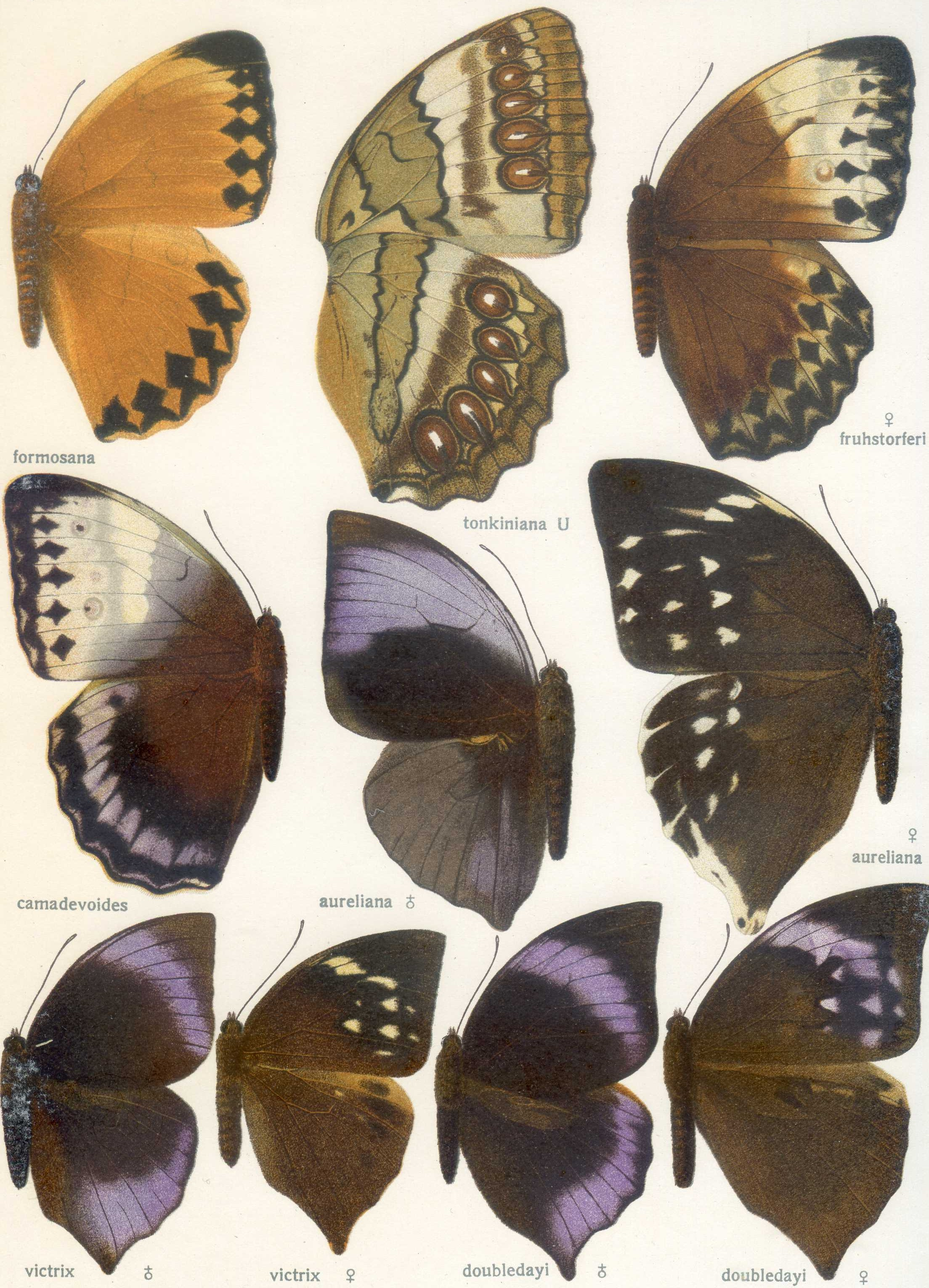
Stichophthalma howqua formosana Stichophthalma howqua tonkiniana Stichophthalma fruhstorferi and Stichophthalma camadeva camadevoides with related species in Adalbert Seitz

== Species ==
- Stichophthalma camadeva (Westwood, 1848) – northern jungle queen
- Stichophthalma cambodia (Hewitson, 1862)
- Stichophthalma fruhstorferi Röber, 1903 (northern Vietnam)
- Stichophthalma godfreyi Rothschild, 1916
- Stichophthalma howqua (Westwood, 1851)
- Stichophthalma louisa Wood-Mason, 1877
- Stichophthalma neumogeni Leech, [1892] (western China, Tibet, southern Vietnam, Hainan Island)
- Stichophthalma nourmahal (Westwood, 1851) – chocolate jungle queen
- Stichophthalma sparta de Nicéville, 1894 – Manipur jungle queen
- Stichophthalma uemurai Nishimura, 1998 (Vietnam)
