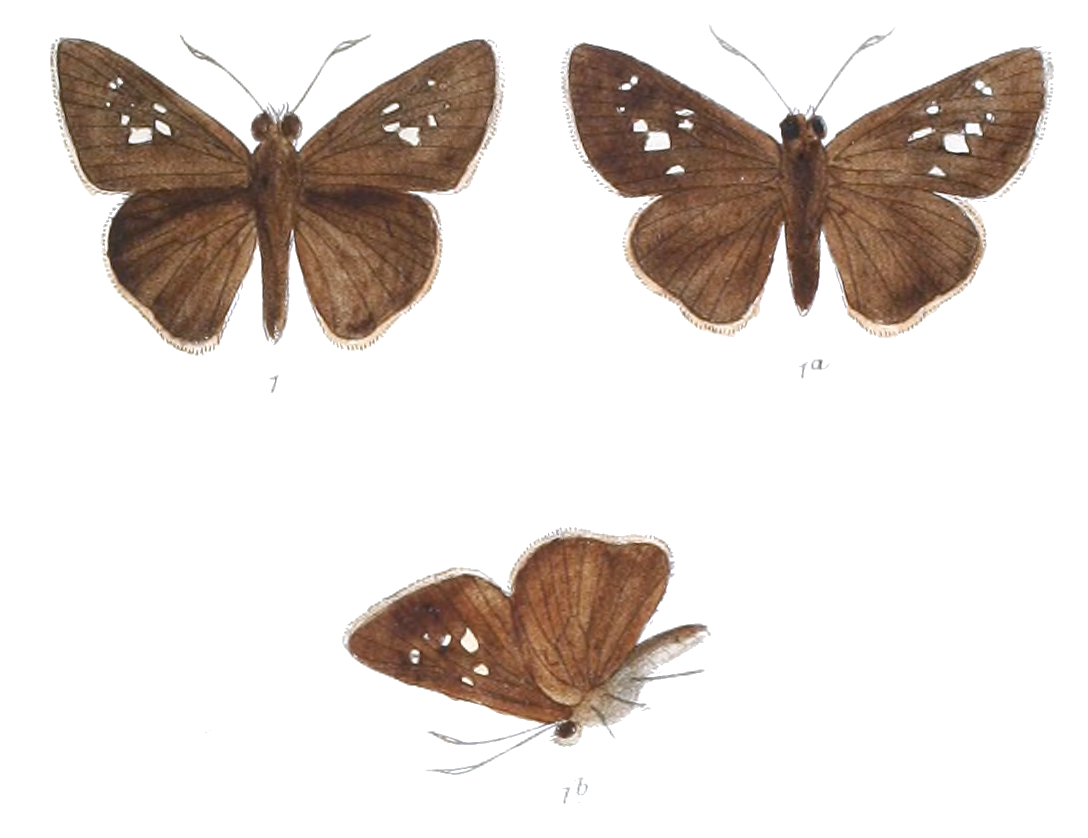

Scientific classification
- Kingdom: Animalia
- Phylum: Arthropoda
- Clade: Pancrustacea
- Class: Insecta
- Order: Lepidoptera
- Family: Hesperiidae
- Genus: Caltoris
- Species: C. cahira

Binomial name
- Caltoris cahira (Moore, 1877)

Subspecies
- Caltoris cahira austeni; Caltoris cahira cahira

= Caltoris cahira =

Species of butterfly

Caltoris cahira, the colon swift, is a species of skipper butterfly found in Asia. It mainly found in the forest area of south Asian countries like Bangladesh, India, etc. Like other swifts, it flies very fast and darts all around. Sometime it basks with its wings spread.

== Description ==
Male. Upperside dark rufous-brown suffused with olive-brown at the base. Forewing with two small yellow spots at end of the cell, two on the disk, and two very small spots before the apex. Underside rufous-brown.
Females have, in addition to the eight spots present in males, a more or less well-developed triangular bright yellow opaque one touching the submedian rather beyond the middle of this, and appearing on the underside as an imperfect band between that vein and the first median veinlet; and, moreover, have the whole underside thickly and evenly clothed with rufous-brown scales. (Wood-Mason and de Niceville)

— Edward Yerbury Watson

Seen in the south Andaman Islands. A related species is found in northeastern India (Sikkim) and is sometimes considered a subspecies Caltoris cahira austeni.
