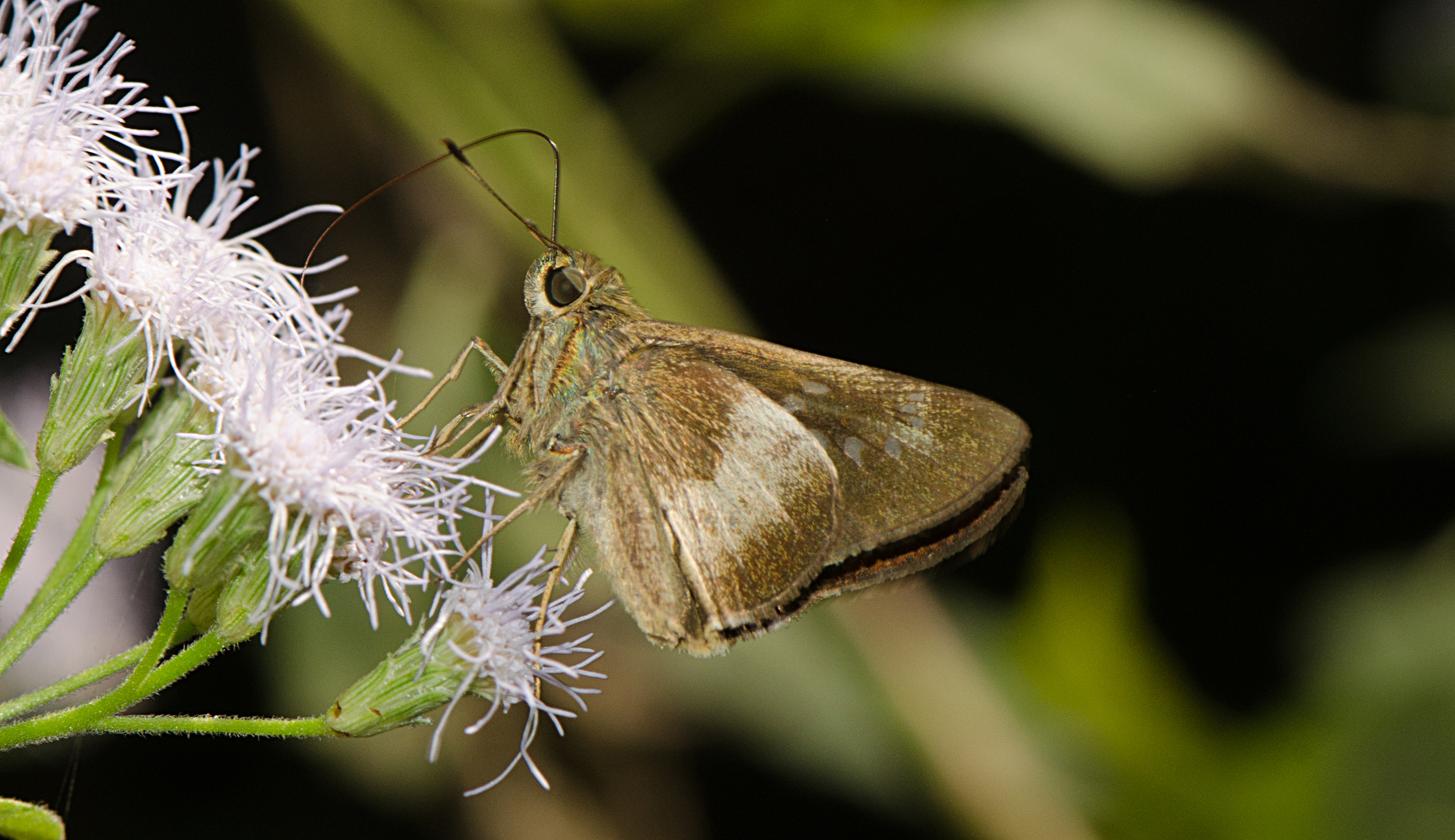

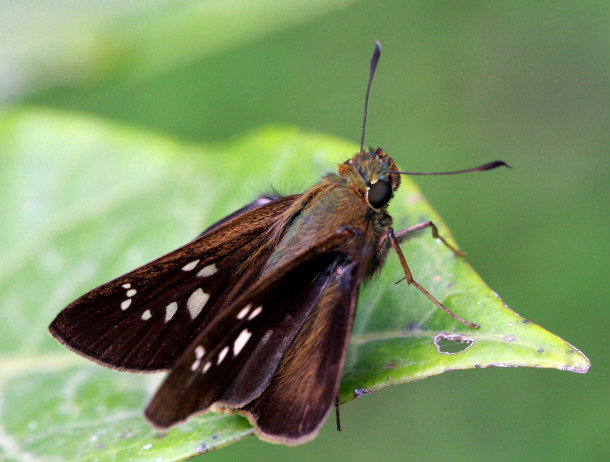

Scientific classification
- Kingdom: Animalia
- Phylum: Arthropoda
- Clade: Pancrustacea
- Class: Insecta
- Order: Lepidoptera
- Family: Hesperiidae
- Genus: Caltoris
- Species: C. canaraica

Binomial name
- Caltoris canaraica (Moore, 1883)

Synonyms
- Parnara canaraica

= Caltoris canaraica =

Kanara swift

Species of butterfly

Caltoris canaraica, the Kanara swift, is a butterfly belonging to the family Hesperiidae.

== Distribution ==
This skipper is found in Southern India (Kerala, Karnataka Tamilnadu and south-western Andhra Pradesh).

== Description ==
Male and Female. Upperside dark brown, basal area olive-brown. Male: Forewing with two small oval semi-diaphanous white spots at the end of the cell, three spots obliquely before the apex, and three on the disk; hindwing without makings; cilia brownish-cinereous. Under side paler brown, irrorated with ochreous scales which are thickly disposed along the costa and apex of forewing and across discal area of hindwing: forewing marked as above, also with a small whitish spot above hind margin: hindwing with two discal white spots. Female: forewing with larger spots than in the male, also with a minute dot beneath the lower discal spot and a triangular yellow spot above hind margin; hindwing with three discal semi-diaphanous spots. Underside: forewing as above: hindwing with four discal white spots, and a fifth at end of the cell.

— Edward Yerbury Watson

Habitat: Canara (Ward)

== Life cycle ==
=== Host plants ===
The larva (caterpillar) has been recorded on Bambusa bambos, Bambusa vulgaris and Pseudoxytenanthera monadelpha.
