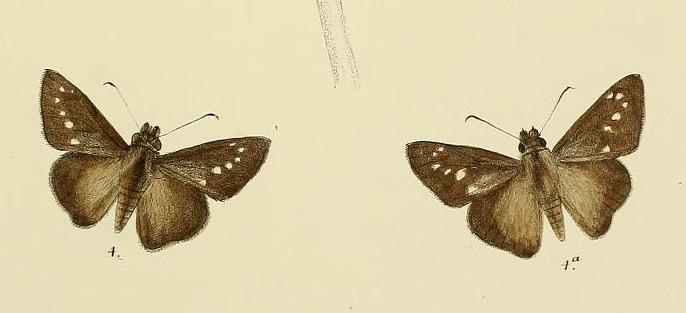

Scientific classification
- Kingdom: Animalia
- Phylum: Arthropoda
- Class: Insecta
- Order: Lepidoptera
- Family: Hesperiidae
- Genus: Caltoris
- Species: C. philippina

Binomial name
- Caltoris philippina (Herrich-Schäffer, 1869)

Synonyms
- Baoris seriata Moore, 1881

= Caltoris philippina =

Philippine swift

Species of butterfly

Caltoris philippina, the Philippine swift, is a butterfly belonging to the family Hesperiidae.

== Description ==
Wings more elongate and termen forewing excavate at end of vein 2. Uncus broader: valva not projecting beyond cuiller. Upperside of forewing spotted. Upperside of forewing with a spot in space 1b. Upperside of forewing without cell spots. Underside of hindwing with olive green scaling. Forewing: 18-20 mm.

— William Harry Evans, A Catalogue of the Hesperiidae from Europe, Asia, and Australia in the British Museum

== Subspecies ==
- C. p. philippina Sri Lanka, India, Malay Peninsula, Nias, Palawan, Philippines, Sulawesi, Talaud, Sangihe, Sula
- C. p. subfenestrata (Röber, 1891) New Guinea, Solomon Islands
