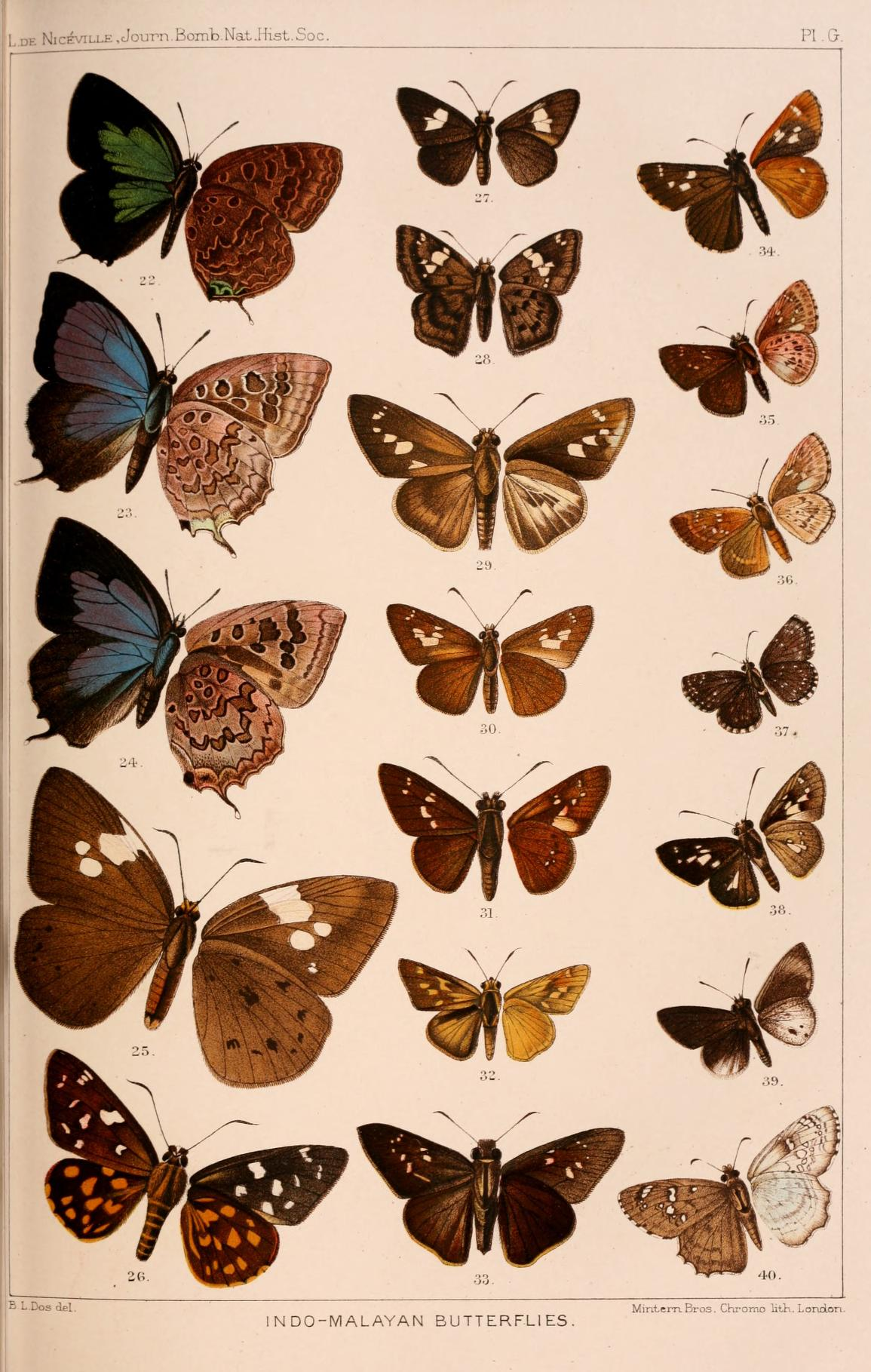
- Figure 33 is Caltoris brunnea caere from Lionel de Nicéville's 1891 "On New and Little-Known Butterflies from the Indo-Malayan Region"

Scientific classification
- Kingdom: Animalia
- Phylum: Arthropoda
- Class: Insecta
- Order: Lepidoptera
- Family: Hesperiidae
- Genus: Caltoris
- Species: C. brunnea

Binomial name
- Caltoris brunnea (Snellen, 1876)

Synonyms
- Pamphila brunnea Snellen, 1876; Pamphila sodalis Mabille, 1893; Chapra caere de Nicéville, 1891

= Caltoris brunnea =

Species of butterfly

Caltoris brunnea, the dark branded swift, is a butterfly in the family Hesperiidae. It was described by Samuel Constantinus Snellen van Vollenhoven in 1876. It is found in the Indomalayan realm in Burma and in Java as subspecies C. b. caere (de Nicéville, 1891). In its size and colouring very similar to oceia [Baoris oceia (Hewitson, 1868)] and simillima [synonym Baoris oceia Hewitson, 1868] but at once discernible by the scent-organ. Of the cellular pencil of the hindwing there is no trace whatever in the male, but the males show an oblique comma-shaped spot in the submedian area of the forewing.

Larvae have been recorded feeding on Bambusa species and Imperata cylindrica.

== Subspecies ==
- Caltoris brunnea brunnea (Java)
- Caltoris brunnea caere (de Nicéville, 1891) (Myanmar)
