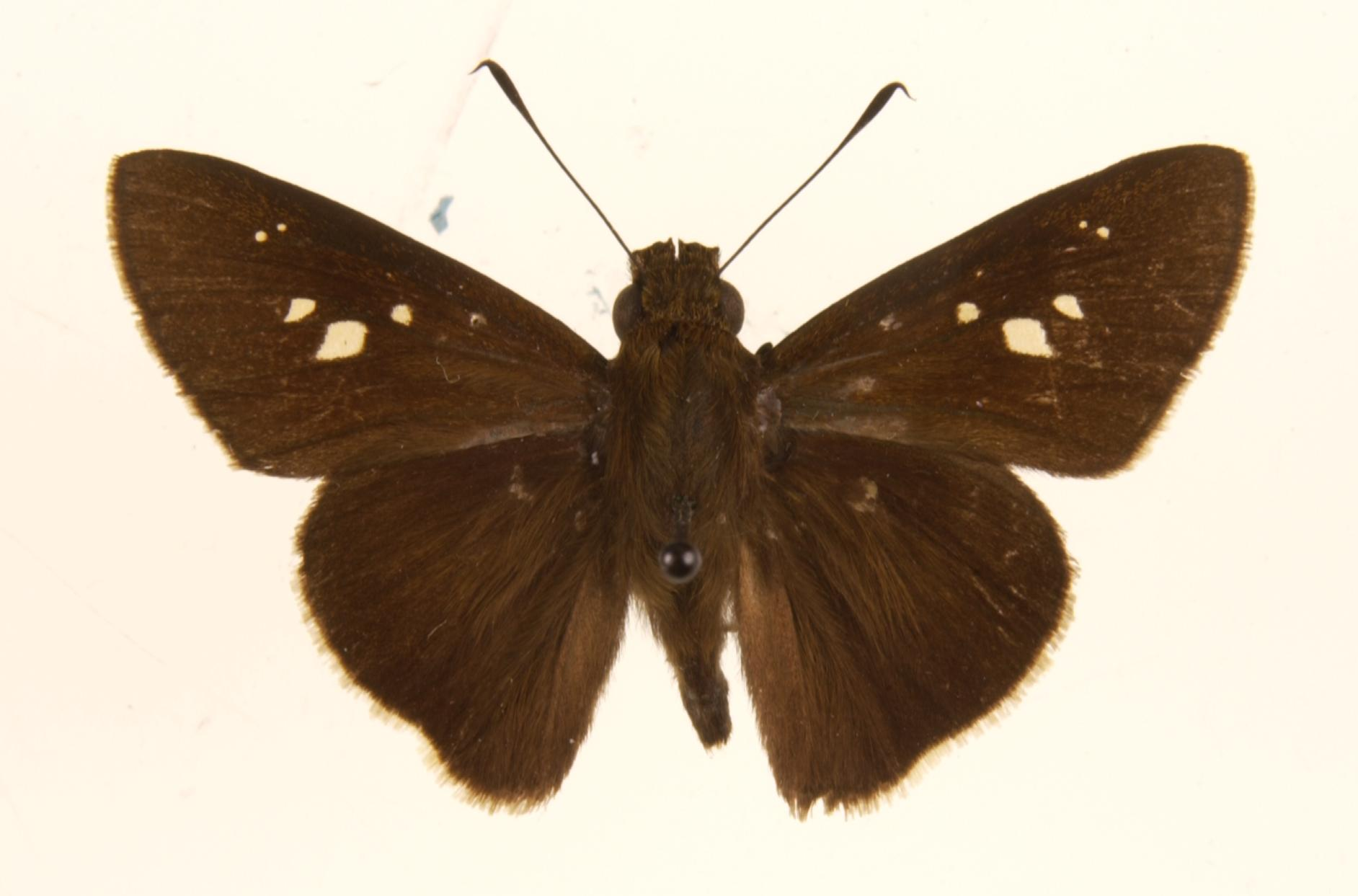
- From Malaya

Scientific classification
- Kingdom: Animalia
- Phylum: Arthropoda
- Class: Insecta
- Order: Lepidoptera
- Family: Hesperiidae
- Genus: Caltoris
- Species: C. cormasa

Binomial name
- Caltoris cormasa (Hewitson, 1876)

= Caltoris cormasa =

Species of butterfly

Caltoris cormasa, the full stop swift, is a species of skipper butterfly found in the Indomalayan realm from India to Malaya
