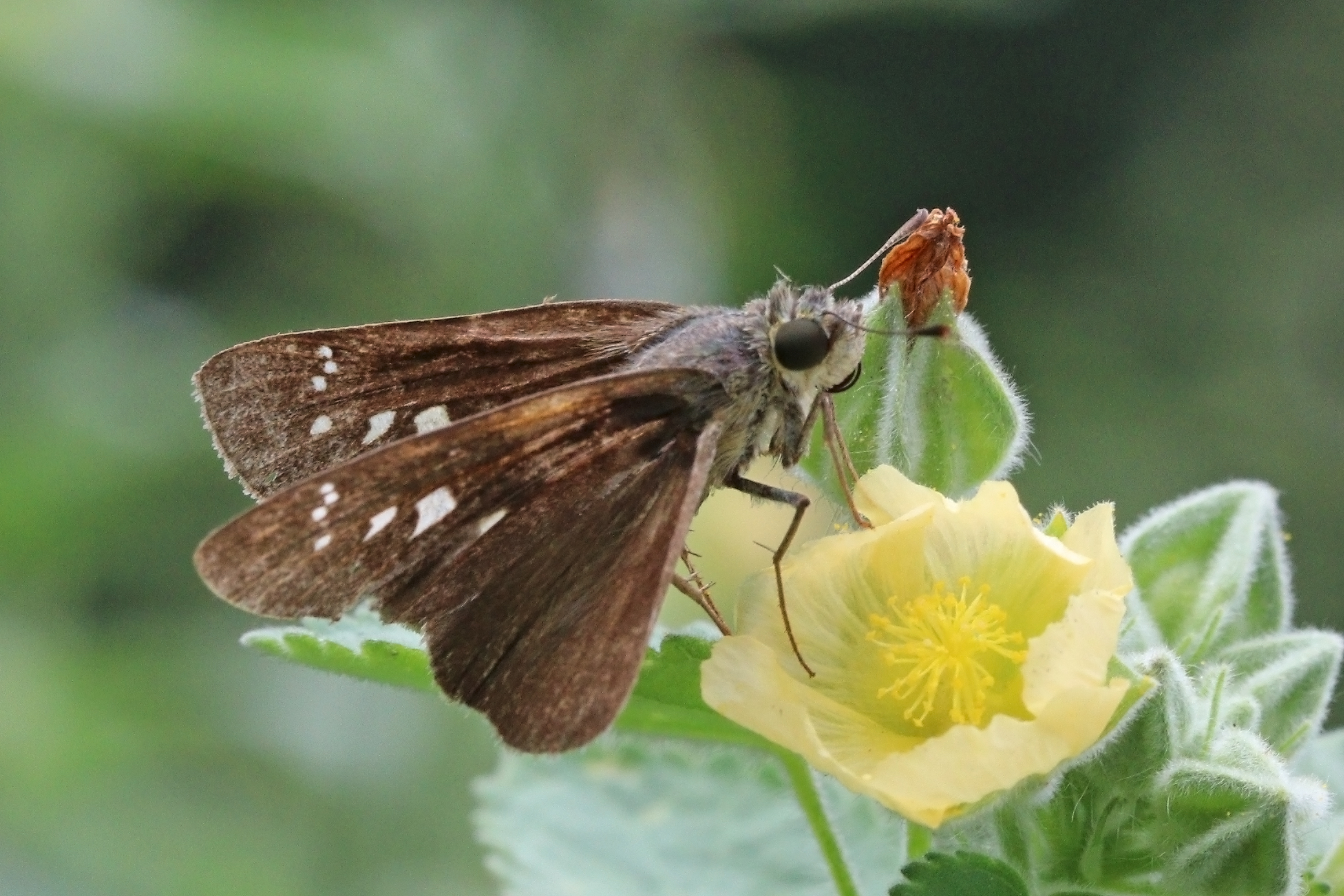
- C.k. kumara Chinnar Wildlife Sanctuary, Kerala, India

Scientific classification
- Kingdom: Animalia
- Phylum: Arthropoda
- Class: Insecta
- Order: Lepidoptera
- Family: Hesperiidae
- Genus: Caltoris
- Species: C. kumara

Binomial name
- Caltoris kumara (Moore, 1878)

Synonyms
- Parnara kumara Moore, 1878

= Caltoris kumara =

Blank swift

Species of butterfly

Caltoris kumara, the blank swift, is a butterfly belonging to the family Hesperiidae.

== Description ==
Female. Upperside dark olive brown; forewing with a transverse discal series of seven yellowish semi-diaphanous spots from before the apex; cilia pale brownish-yellow. Underside deep ochreous-brown; forewing marked as above, the lowest spot being yellow : hindwing with a single discal indistinct yellow spot between the two lower median branches, Palpi and body brown; tarsi ochreous. This species is also found in Ceylon, the male differing from the female above and beneath in the first upper and lower discal spots being absent.

— Edward Yerbury Watson

It is found in the India and Sri Lanka. In India, a range extension of this species to the western Himalaya was recorded in 2018.

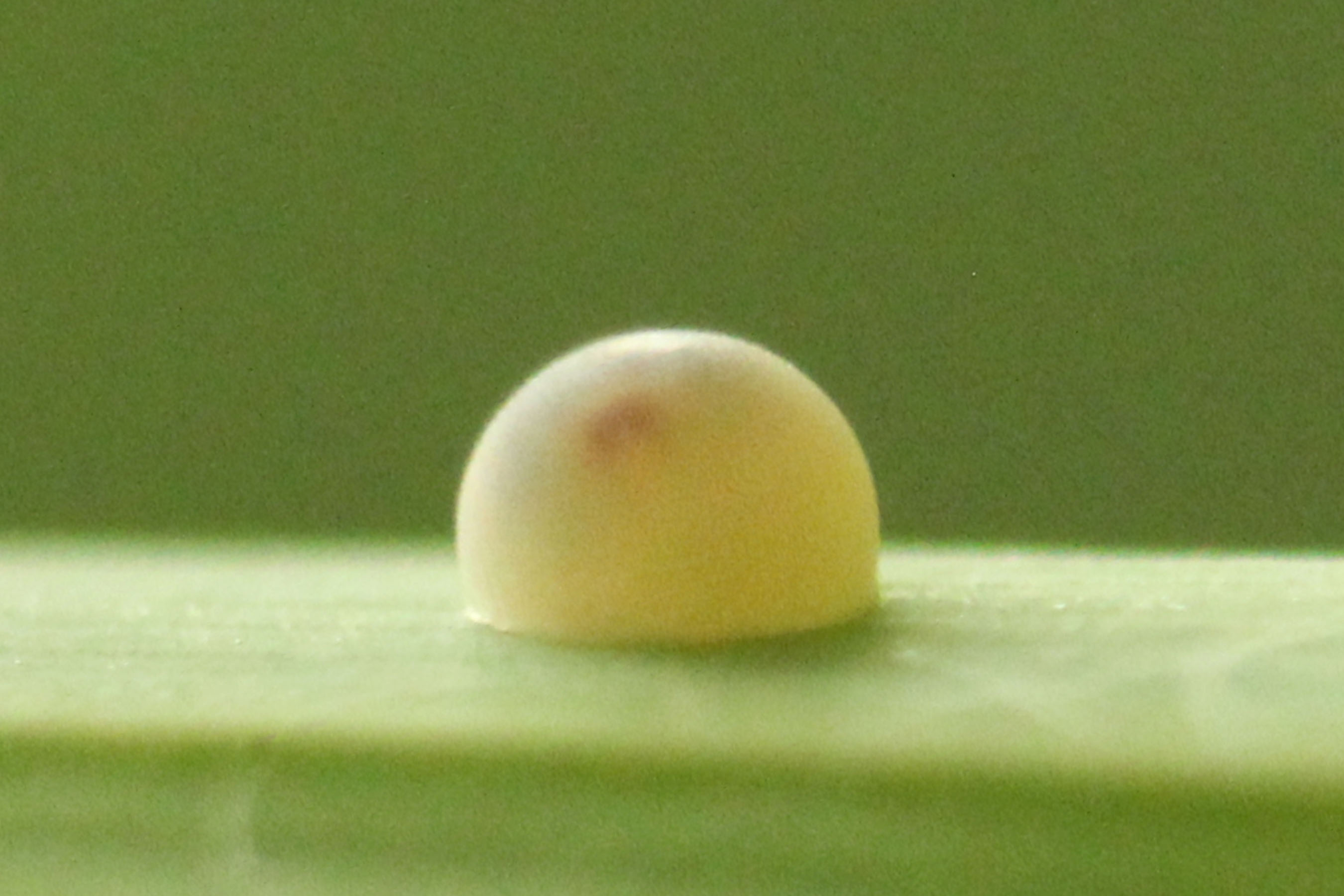
Egg

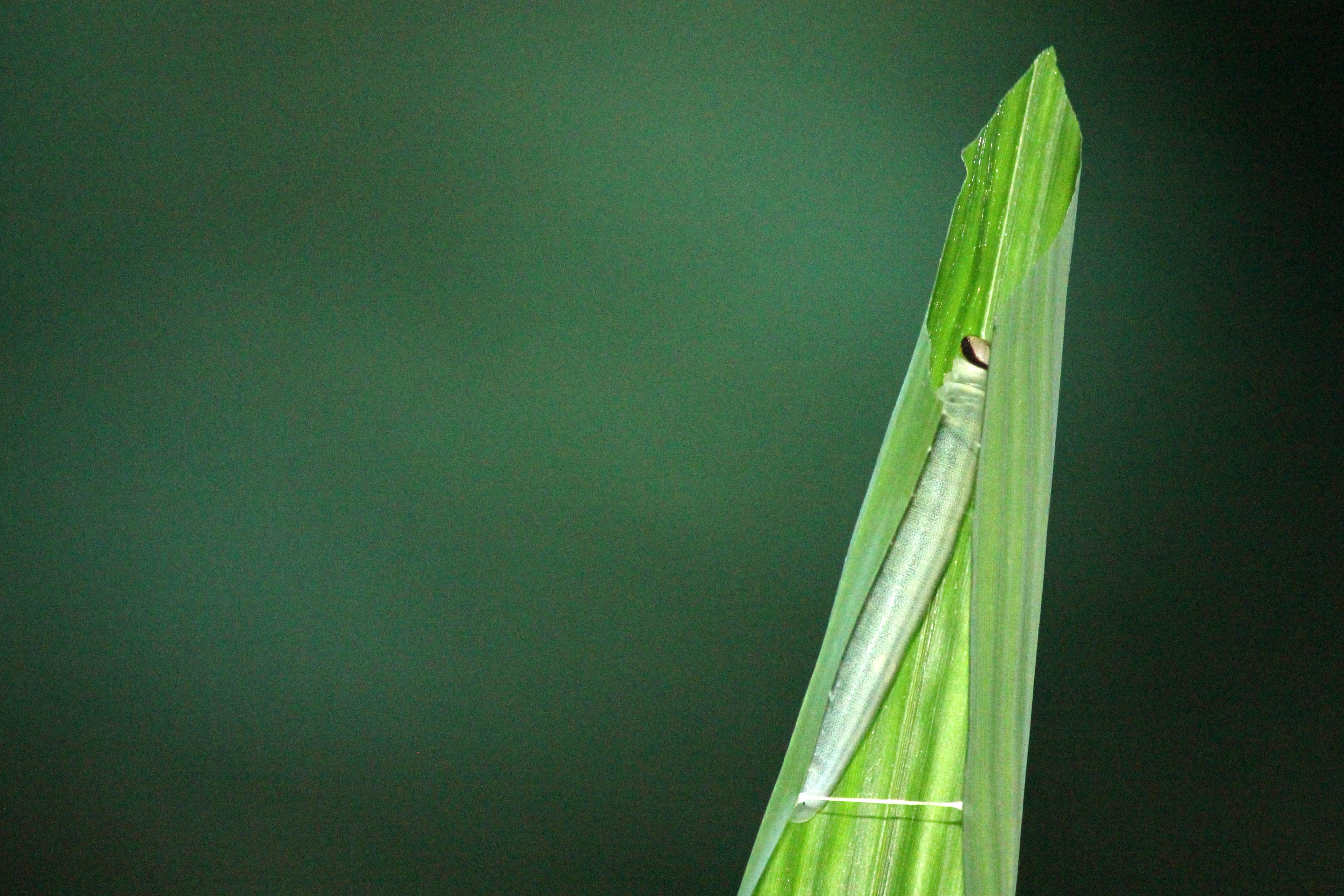
Larva

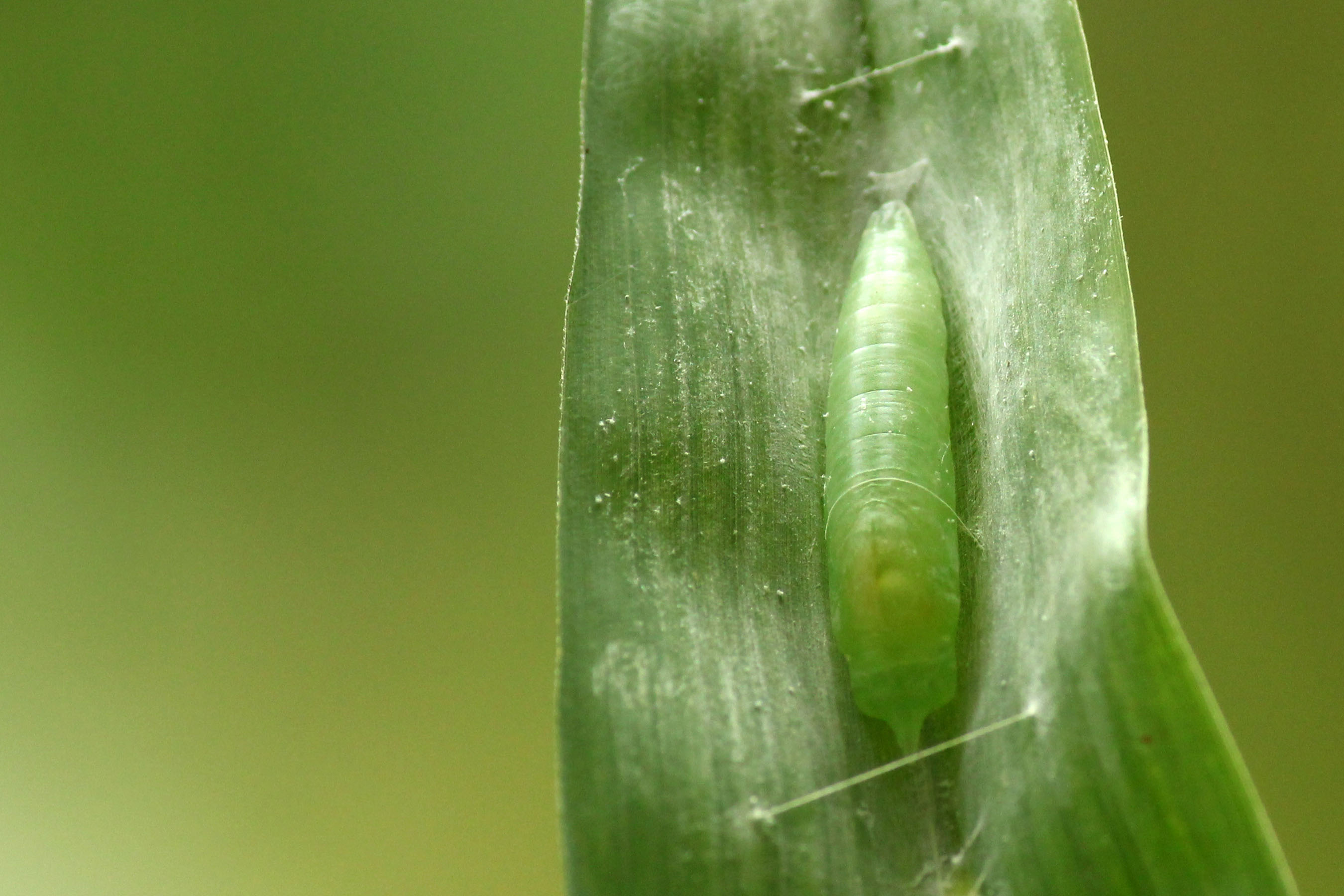
Pupa

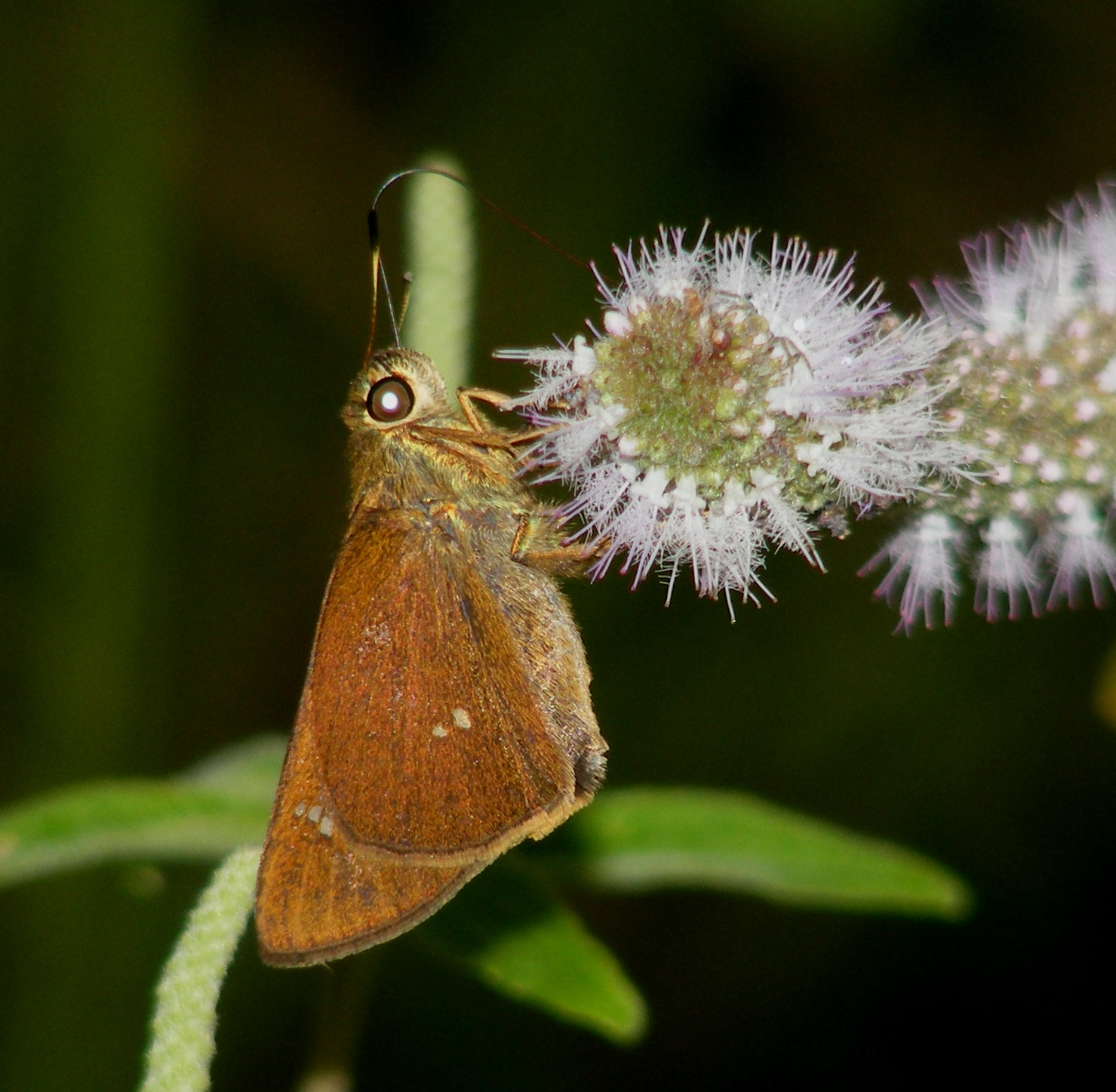
Imago
