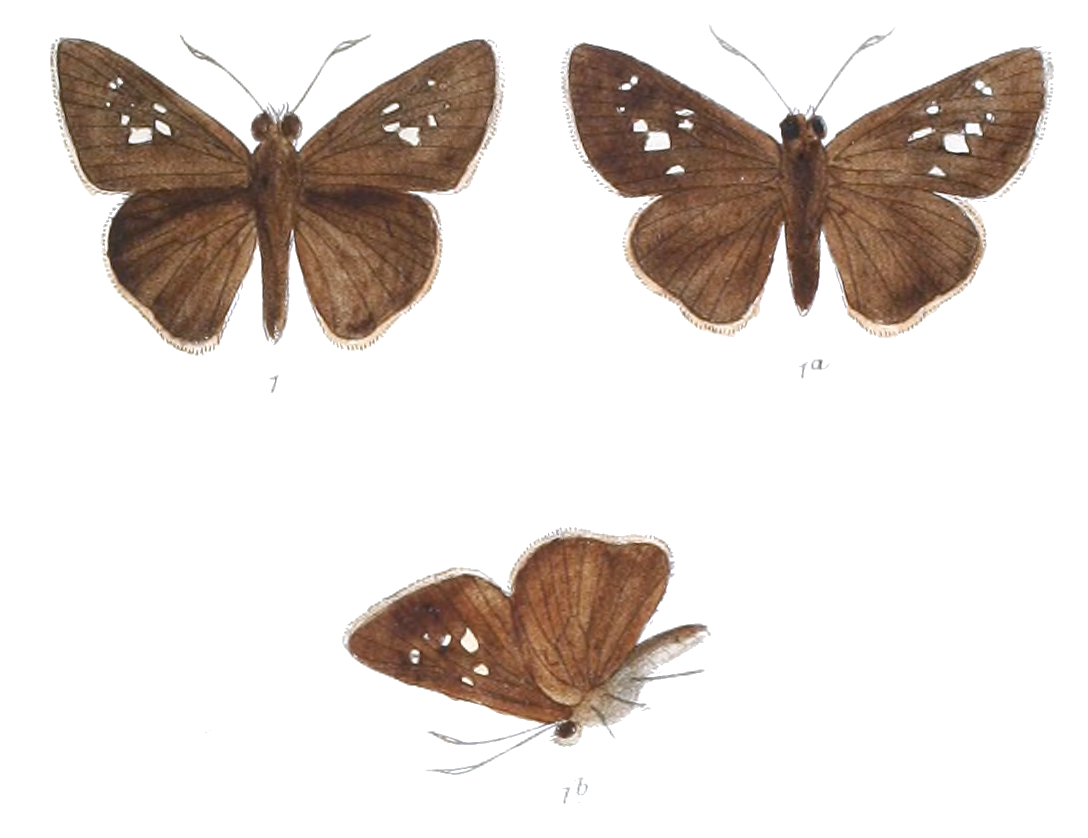
- Caltoris cahira

Scientific classification
- Kingdom: Animalia
- Phylum: Arthropoda
- Clade: Pancrustacea
- Class: Insecta
- Order: Lepidoptera
- Family: Hesperiidae
- Subfamily: Hesperiinae
- Tribe: Baorini
- Genus: Caltoris; C. Swinhoe, 1893

Synonyms
- Milena Evans, 1912

= Caltoris =

Genus of butterflies

Caltoris is a genus of skipper butterflies. Like several related genera, they are called "swifts." It is found in the Indomalayan realm and the Australasian realm.

== Species ==
- Caltoris aurociliata (Elwes & Edwards, 1897) Sikkim, Assam
- Caltoris beraka (Plötz, 1885) Celebes
- Caltoris boisduvalii (C. Felder & R. Felder, [1867]) Papua
- Caltoris bromus (Leech, 1894) India, China, Indo-China, Malay Peninsula, Sumatra, Java, Lesser Sunda Is., Borneo, Palawan, Philippines
- Caltoris brunnea (Snellen, 1876) Java, Myanmar
- Caltoris cahira, colon swift,
  - Caltoris cahira austeni, Austen's swift
- Caltoris canaraica, Kanara swift
- Caltoris confusa
- Caltoris cormasa (Hewitson, 1876) India to Malaya
- Caltoris kumara, blank swift
- Caltoris malaya (Evans, 1926) Malay Peninsula, Borneo, Java
- Caltoris mehavagga (Fruhstorfer, 1911) Celebes, Sula, Buru
- Caltoris nirwana (Plötz, 1882) Java to West China
- Caltoris philippina, Philippine swift
- Caltoris plebeia (de Nicéville, 1887) tufted swift. Sikkim to Borneo
- Caltoris septentrionalis Koiwaiya, 1996
- Caltoris sirius (Evans, 1926) Tibet
- Caltoris tenuis (Evans, 1932) Myanmar, Thailand, Laos
- Caltoris tulsi (de Nicéville, [1884]) purple swift. India to Malaya, South China, Java

The larvae variously feed on Poaceae, Arecaceae:-Bambusa, Imperata, Dendrocalamus, Sinarundinaria, Oryza, Saccharum.
