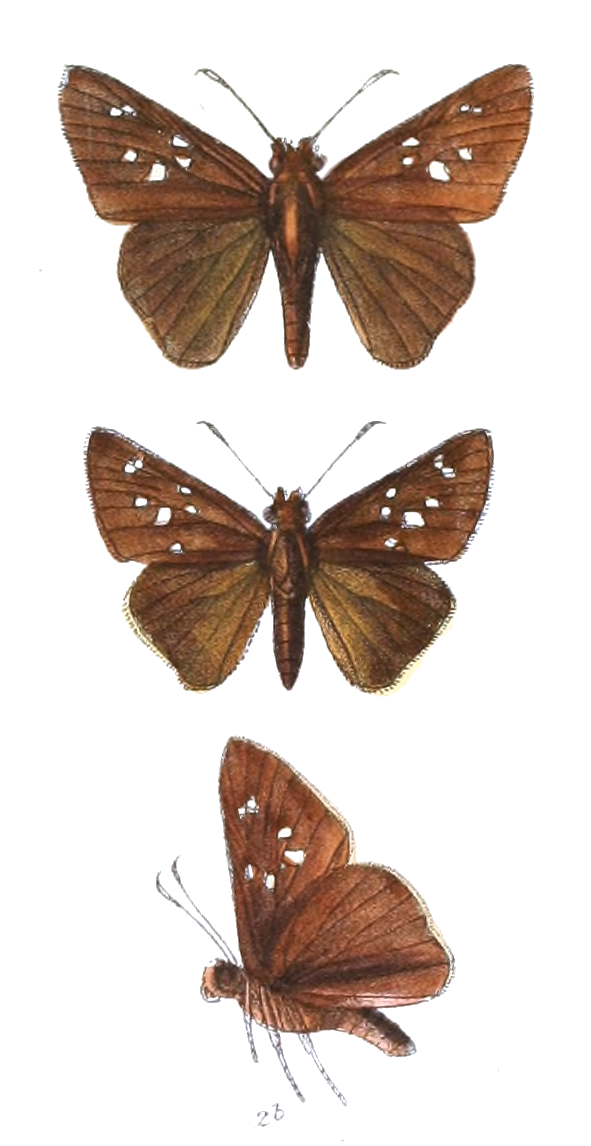
- Male, female and male underside

Scientific classification
- Kingdom: Animalia
- Phylum: Arthropoda
- Clade: Pancrustacea
- Class: Insecta
- Order: Lepidoptera
- Family: Hesperiidae
- Genus: Caltoris
- Species: C. cahira
- Subspecies: C. c. austeni

Trinomial name
- Caltoris cahira austeni (Moore, 1883)

Synonyms
- Parnara austeni Baoris austeni

= Caltoris cahira austeni =

Subspecies of butterfly

Caltoris cahira austeni, the Austen's swift, is a subspecies of skipper butterfly found in Asia.

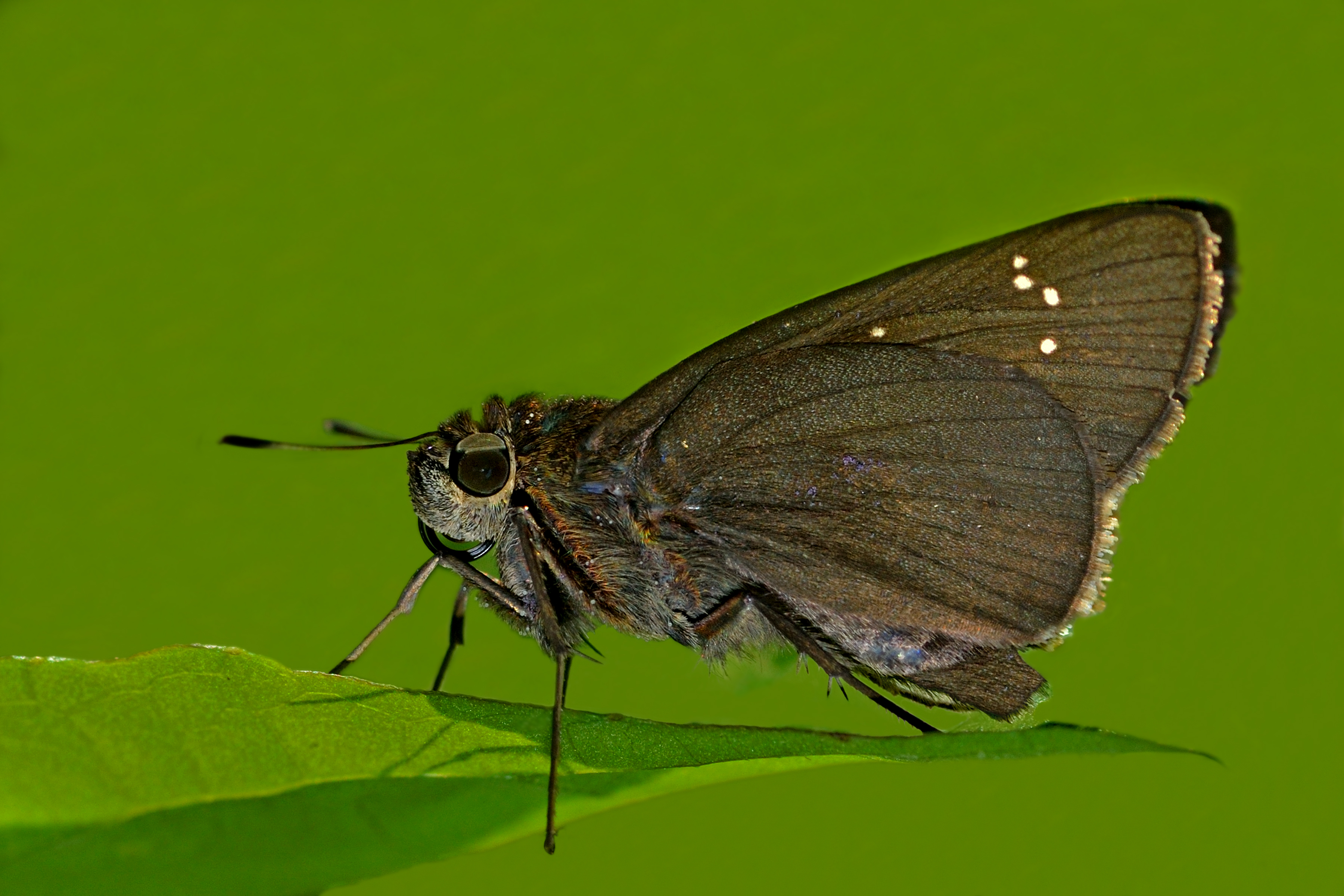
Close wing position of Caltoris cahira austeni Moore, 1883 - Austen's swift

== Description ==
Male and Female. Upperside dark brown. Male: forewing with two small semi-hyaline white spots at end of the cell, two before the apex, and three obliquely on the disk, the two upper of which are small. Female with markings the same, but slightly larger; also with a small yellow spot above the hind margin; cilia cinereous-white. Underside as above; both sexes having also a slight yellowish patch above the hind margin.

— Edward Yerbury Watson

It is found in the Khasi Hills, Sikkim and Cherrapunji.
