= ISMA =

Isma is a genus of butterflies.

ISMA may refer to:

- The Ikatan Muslimin Malaysia (ISMA), a Malaysian NGO
- The International Securities Market Association
- The International Supermodified Association, a sanctioning body in modified racing
- The Internet Streaming Media Alliance
- Esmaël Gonçalves, also known as Isma, Bissau-Guinean professional footballer
