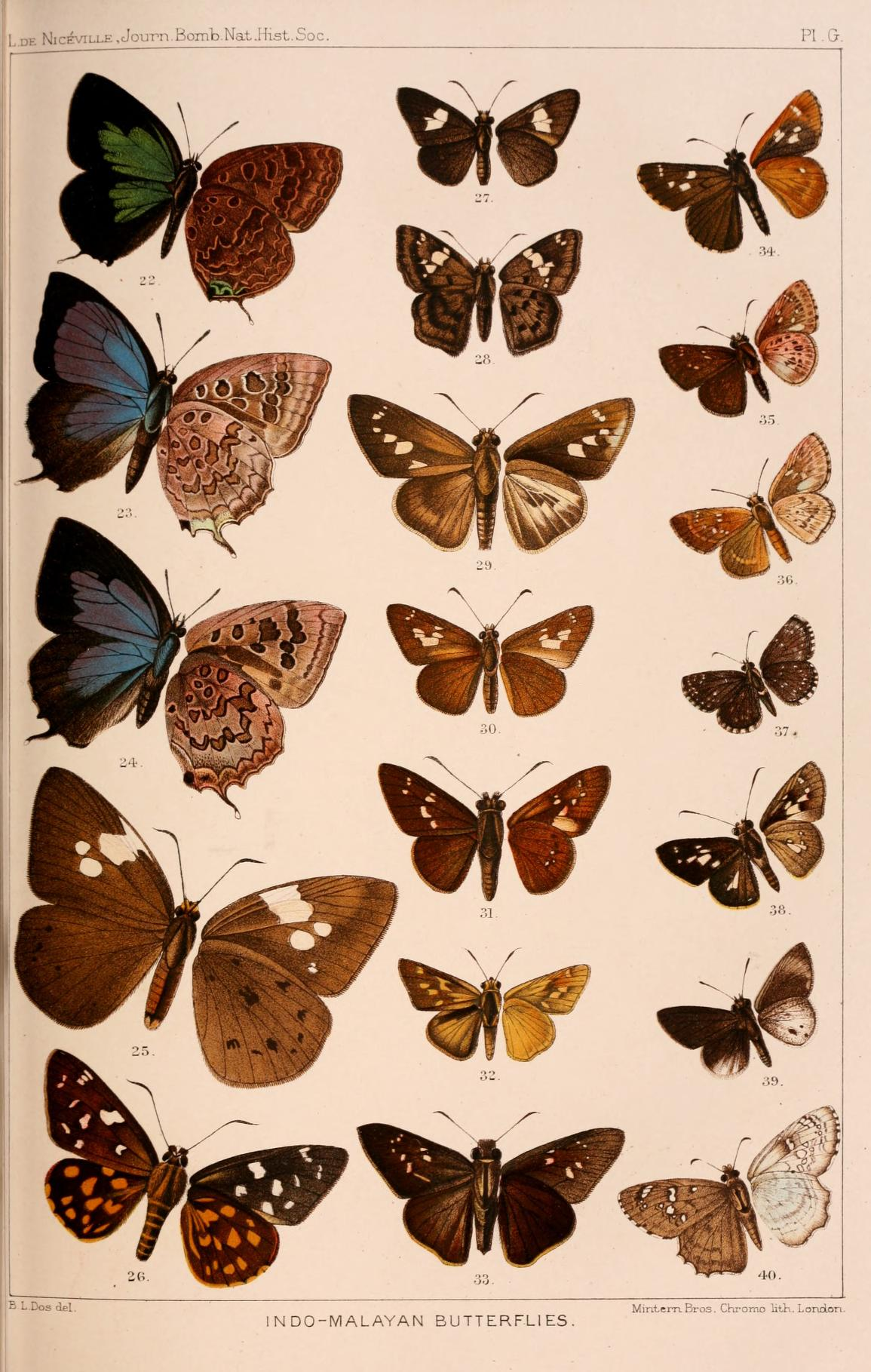
- Figure 31 from Lionel de Nicéville's 1891 "On New and Little-Known Butterflies from the Indo-Malayan Region"

Scientific classification
- Kingdom: Animalia
- Phylum: Arthropoda
- Class: Insecta
- Order: Lepidoptera
- Family: Hesperiidae
- Genus: Isma
- Species: I. miosticta

Binomial name
- Isma miosticta (de Nicéville, [1890])

Synonyms
- Parnara miosticta de Nicéville, 1891; Sepa indistincta Druce, 1912

= Isma miosticta =

Species of butterfly

Isma miosticta is a butterfly in the family Hesperiidae. It was described by Lionel de Nicéville in 1891. It is found in the Indomalayan realm (Burma, Thailand, Langkawi, Malaysia, Borneo, Bangka, Sipora and Siberut). The ground colour is brown.The subapical spots are white and the curved row of discal spots are yellow. There is a diffuse spot in space 1b.In females, the spots are generally larger and more quadrate (square-shaped) than in males.
