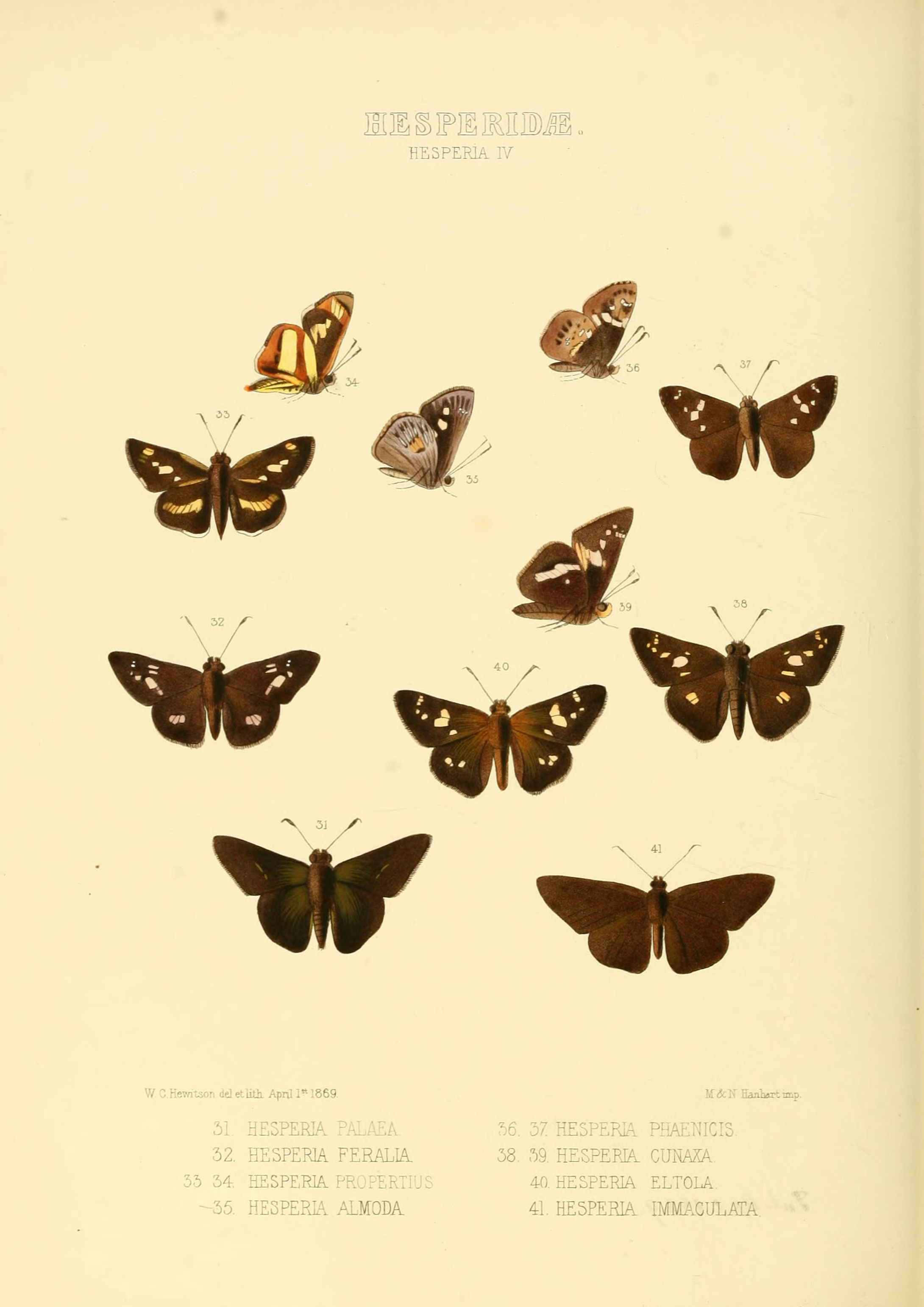
- Isma feralia figure 32

Scientific classification
- Kingdom: Animalia
- Phylum: Arthropoda
- Class: Insecta
- Order: Lepidoptera
- Family: Hesperiidae
- Tribe: Erionotini
- Genus: Isma; Distant, 1886

Species
- See text

= Isma =

Genus of butterflies

Isma is an Indomalayan genus of grass skippers in the family Hesperiidae.

== Species ==
Listed alphabetically:

- Isma binotata Elwes & Edwards, 1897 – Borneo
- Isma bononia (Hewitson, 1868) – Singapore, Malaysia
- Isma bononoides (Druce, 1912) – Borneo
- Isma bonota Cantlie & Norman, 1959
- Isma cinnamomea (Elwes & Edwards, 1897) – Borneo, Sumatra
- Isma cronus (de Nicéville, 1894)
- Isma dawna (Evans, 1926) – south Myanmar
- Isma dichroa (Kollar, 1844)
- Isma feralia (Hewitson, 1868) – Myanmar, Java
- Isma flemingi Eliot, 1984 – Malaysia
- Isma guttulifera (Elwes & Edwards, 1897) – Malaya
- Isma hislopi Eliot, 1973 – Malaysia
- Isma iapis (de Nicéville, 1890) – plain tufted lancer – Johor, Malaysia
- Isma miosticta (de Nicéville, 1891) – Borneo, Malaysia
- Isma protoclea (Herrich-Schäffer, 1869) – Myanmar
- Isma umbrosa (Elwes & Edwards, 1897 – Borneo, Vietnam

== Biology ==
The larvae feed on Musa, Pandanus.

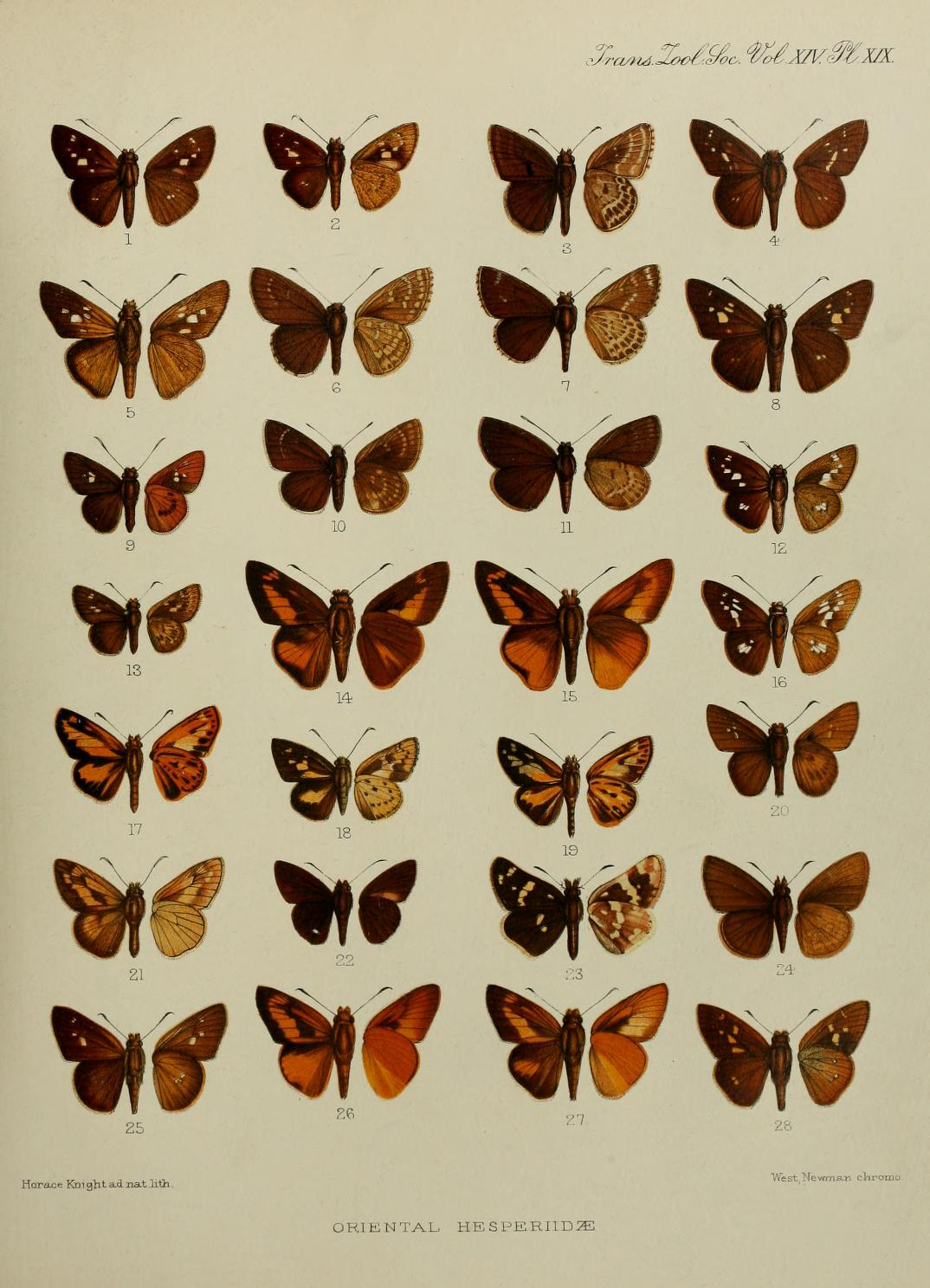
I. umbrosa, I. binotata, I.bipunctata, I. guttulifera and I. feralia in Elwes & Edwards, 1897

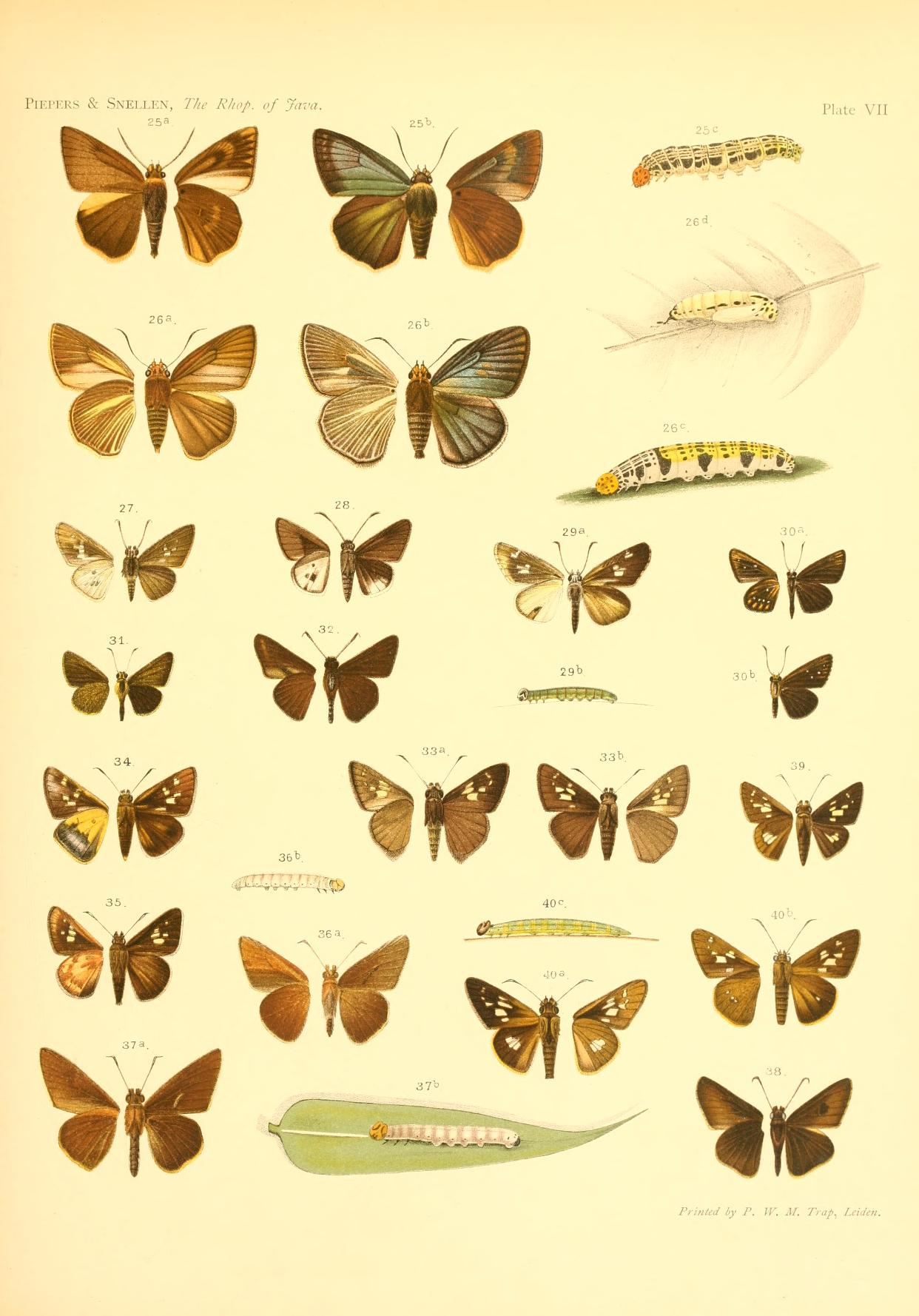
I. bononia, I. iapis and I. feralia in Piepers and Snellen The Rhopalocera of Java

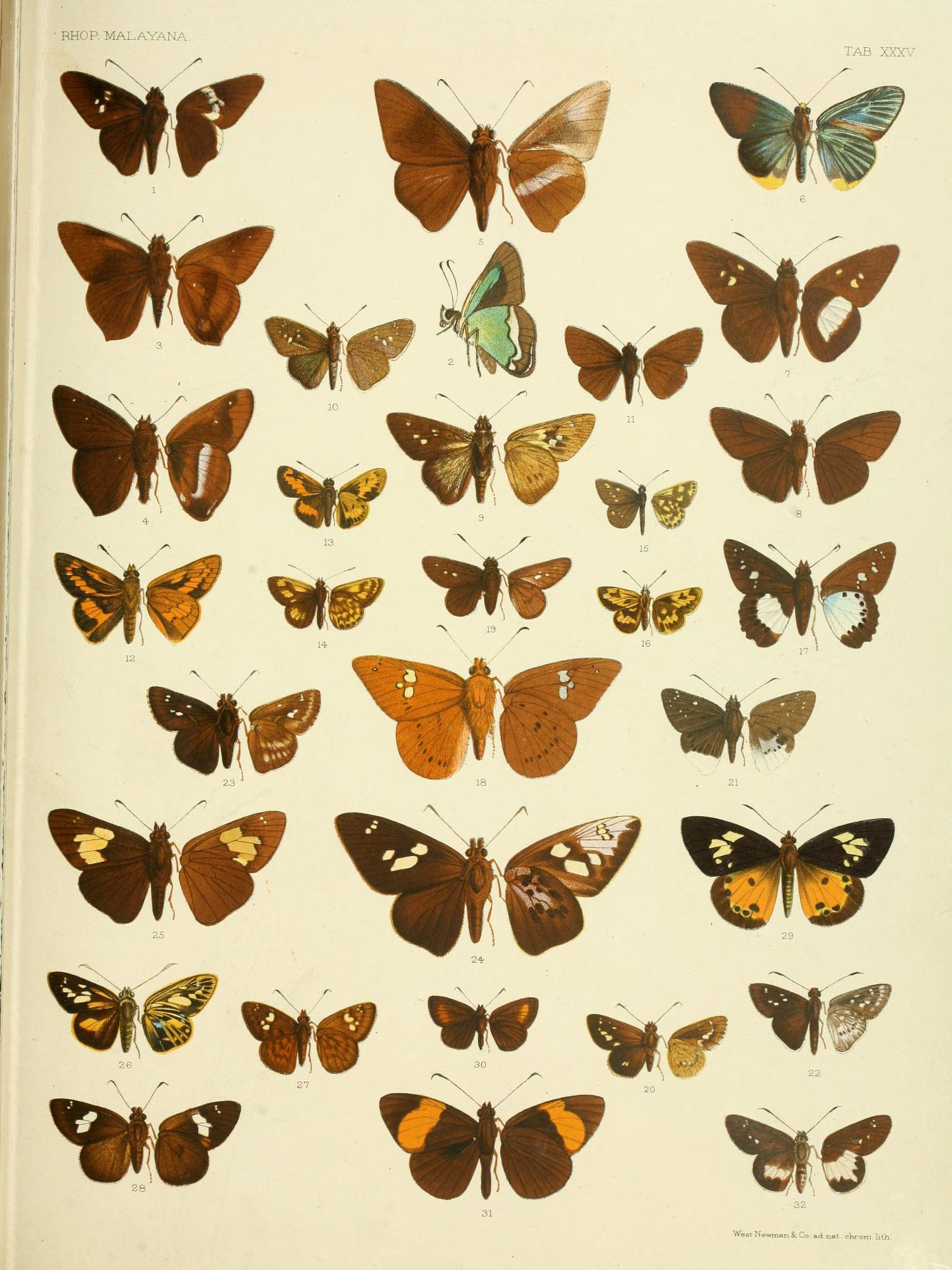
I. protoclea and I. bononia in Rhopalocera Malayana

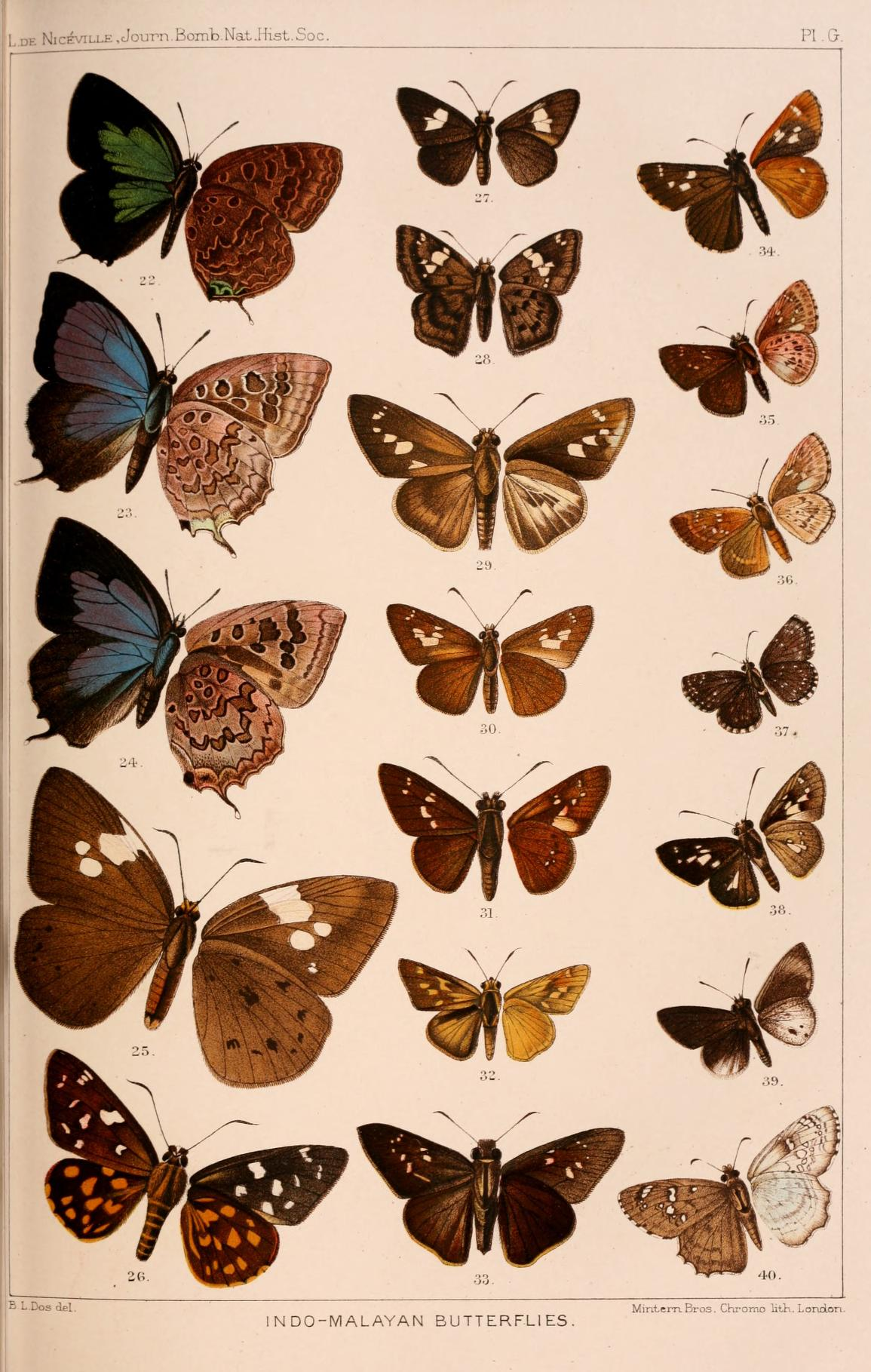
I. miosticta in de Nicéville, 1891
