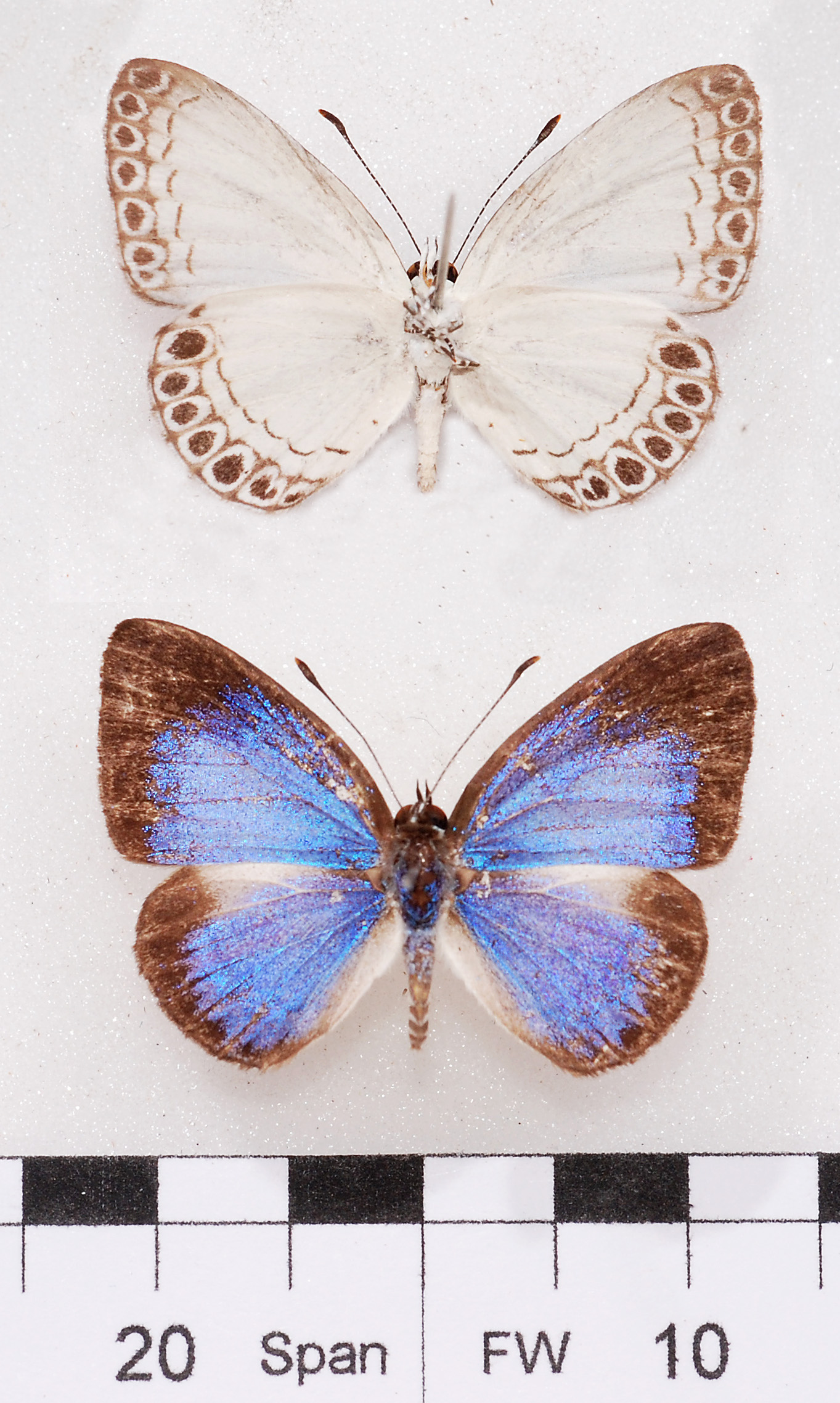

Scientific classification
- Domain: Eukaryota
- Kingdom: Animalia
- Phylum: Arthropoda
- Class: Insecta
- Order: Lepidoptera
- Family: Lycaenidae
- Genus: Lycaenopsis
- Species: L. haraldus

Binomial name
- Lycaenopsis haraldus (Fabricius, 1787)

Synonyms
- Papilio haraldus Fabricius, 1787; Lycaenopsis ananga C. & R. Felder, [1865]; Cupido cornuta Druce, 1873

= Lycaenopsis haraldus =

Species of butterfly

Lycaenopsis haraldus, Felder's Hedge Blue, is a butterfly in the family Lycaenidae. It was described by Johan Christian Fabricius in 1787. It is found in the Indomalayan realm.

== Subspecies ==
- Lycaenopsis haraldus haraldus (Thailand, Malay Peninsula, Sumatra, Bangka)
- Lycaenopsis haraldus cornuta (Druce, 1873) (Borneo)
- Lycaenopsis haraldus renonga Riley, 1932 (southern Burma, Thailand)
- Lycaenopsis haraldus annamitica Eliot & Kawazoé, 1983 (southern Vietnam)
- Lycaenopsis haraldus mayaangelae Takanami, 1990 (Belitung)
