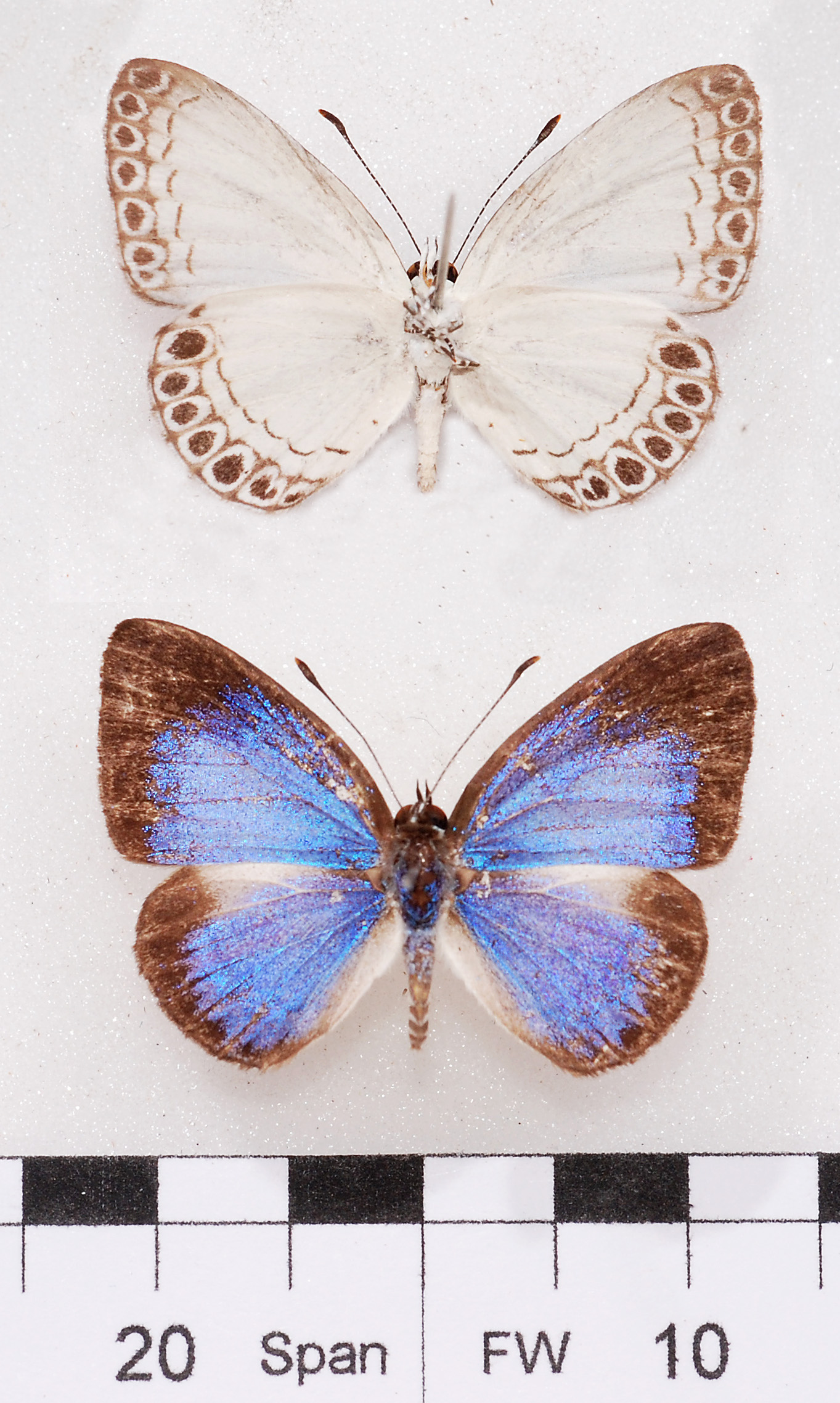
- Lycaenopsis haraldus cornuta

Scientific classification
- Domain: Eukaryota
- Kingdom: Animalia
- Phylum: Arthropoda
- Class: Insecta
- Order: Lepidoptera
- Family: Lycaenidae
- Subfamily: Polyommatinae
- Tribe: Polyommatini
- Genus: Lycaenopsis; C. & R. Felder, [1865]

Species
- Lycaenopsis haraldus (Fabricius, 1787); Lycaenopsis marginata; Lycaenopsis minima; Lycaenopsis transpectus

= Lycaenopsis =

Butterfly genus in family Lycaenidae

Lycaenopsis is a genus of lycaenid butterflies.
