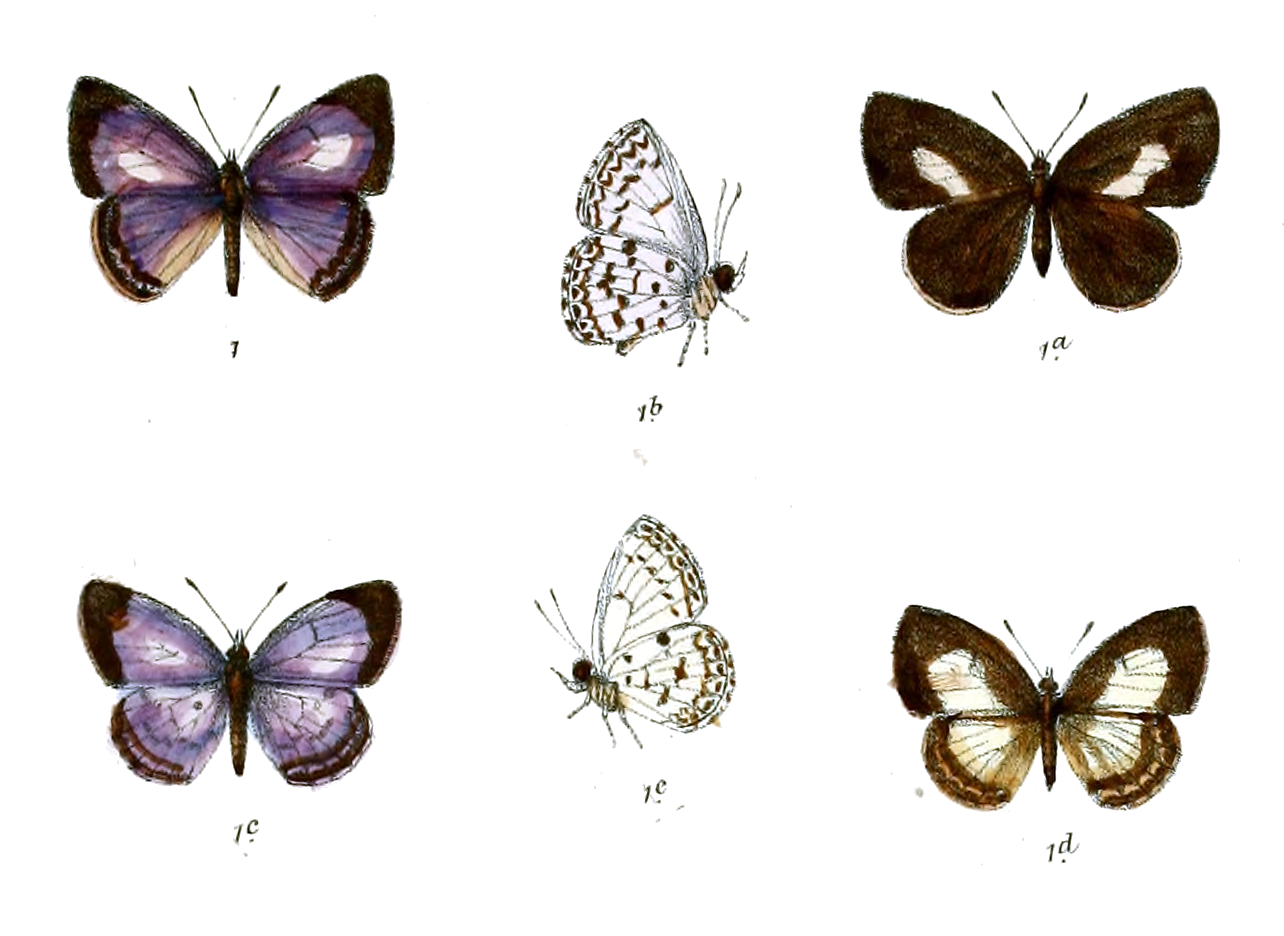

Scientific classification
- Domain: Eukaryota
- Kingdom: Animalia
- Phylum: Arthropoda
- Class: Insecta
- Order: Lepidoptera
- Family: Lycaenidae
- Genus: Lycaenopsis
- Species: L. transpectus

Binomial name
- Lycaenopsis transpectus (Moore, 1879)

= Lycaenopsis transpectus =

White-banded hedge blue

Species of butterfly

Lycaenopsis transpectus, the white-banded hedge blue, is a small butterfly found in India that belongs to the Lycaenids or Blues family.

== Description ==
Male butterflies have white upper side.

Forewing: costa narrowly, apex broadly and terminal border black, the inner margin of this colour curved opposite the apex but extended straight down the termen to the dorsal margin, the black border on the termen of even width below vein 4; the rest of the wing, except a very broad discal anteriorly-rounded area, shaded with lilacine blue. Hindwing: shaded with lilacine blue that fades to diffuse white on an anterior discal area corresponding to the white discal area on the forewing; a subterminal series of transverse small spots and a slender anteciliary line black. In some specimens (var. latimargo) there is a broad black band on the termen which coalesces with and spreads inwards beyond the line of subterminal black spots. Underside: white with a faint bluish tint; markings slender and delicate. Forewing: a slender short brown line on the discocellulars; a postdiscal, very regular, transverse series of abbreviated, slender, short pale brown lines all en echelon with one another, followed by an obscure similarly coloured lunular line and subterminal series of spots. Hindwing: the three transversely-placed subbasal spots and the subcostal spot in interspace 7 black, the rest of the markings pale brown, the discal series of spots more regular than, in most of the forms; the terminal markings as on the forewing. In var. latimargo the markings are much coarser and the terminal series on both forewings and hindwings more clearly defined. Antennae, head, thorax and abdomen black, the antennas annulated with white; beneath: the palpi, thorax and abdomen white. Female upperside: similar to that of the male but the white area of much less extent on the forewing, of greater extent on the hindwing, the suffusion of lilacine blue absent on both forewings and hindwings; the terminal markings on the hindwing broader and more clearly defined. Underside ground colour and markings as in the male. Antenna, head, thorax and abdomen dark brown, not black, but otherwise as in the male.

== Taxonomy ==
The butterfly was earlier known as Lycaenopsis transpecta Moore.

== Range ==
It is found from Sikkim in India to Myanmar.

== See also ==
- List of butterflies of India
- List of butterflies of India (Lycaenidae)
