= Lycaenopsis minima =

Tiny hedge blue

Scientific classification
- Domain: Eukaryota
- Kingdom: Animalia
- Phylum: Arthropoda
- Class: Insecta
- Order: Lepidoptera
- Family: Lycaenidae
- Genus: Lycaenopsis
- Species: L. minima

Binomial name
- Lycaenopsis minima (Evans, 1932)

Species of butterfly

Lycaenopsis minima, the tiny hedge blue, is a small butterfly found in India that belongs to the lycaenids or blues family.

== Range ==
It is found from Manipur in India to the Dawna Hills of Myanmar.

== See also ==
- List of butterflies of India
- List of butterflies of India (Lycaenidae)
