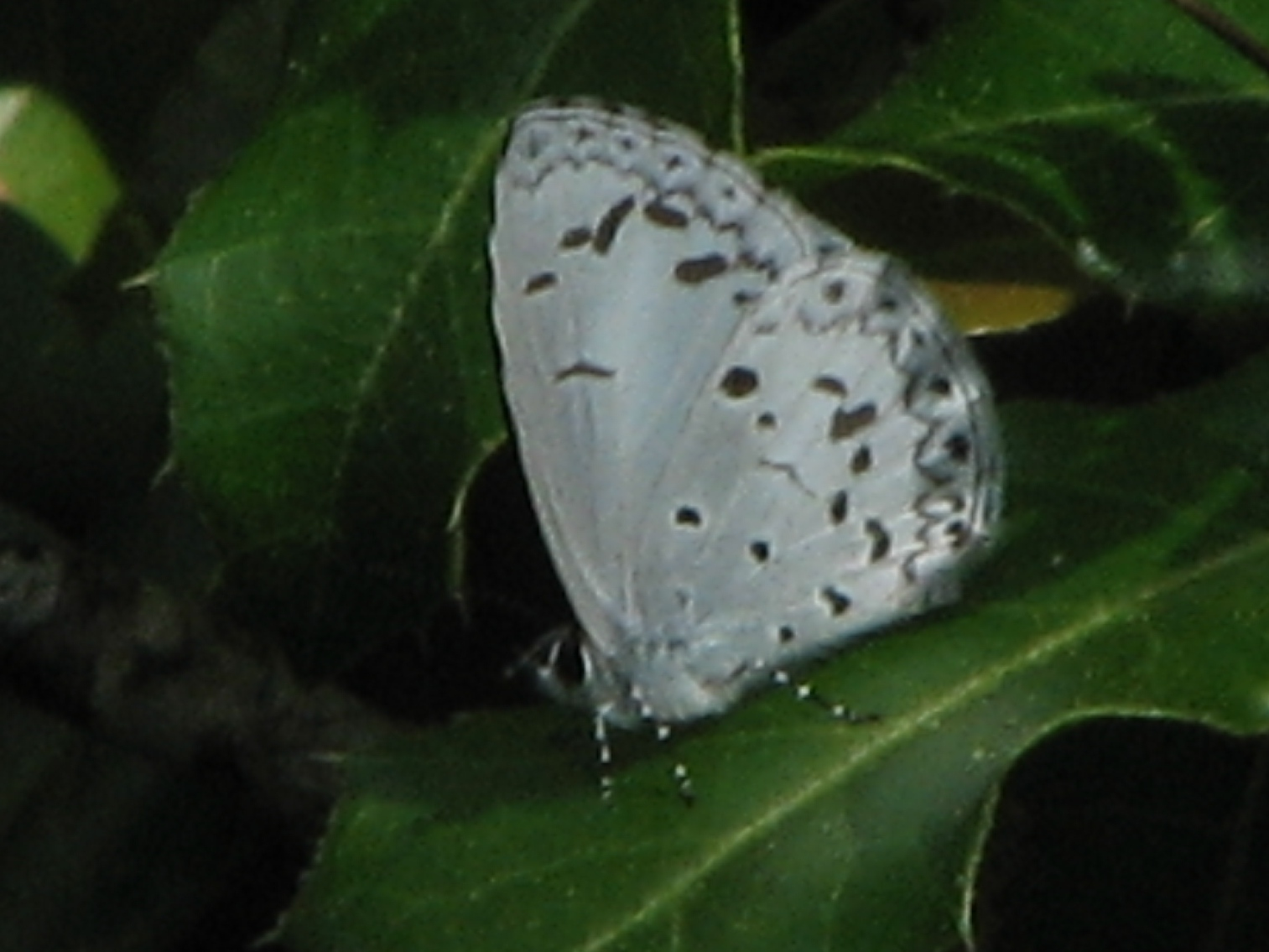

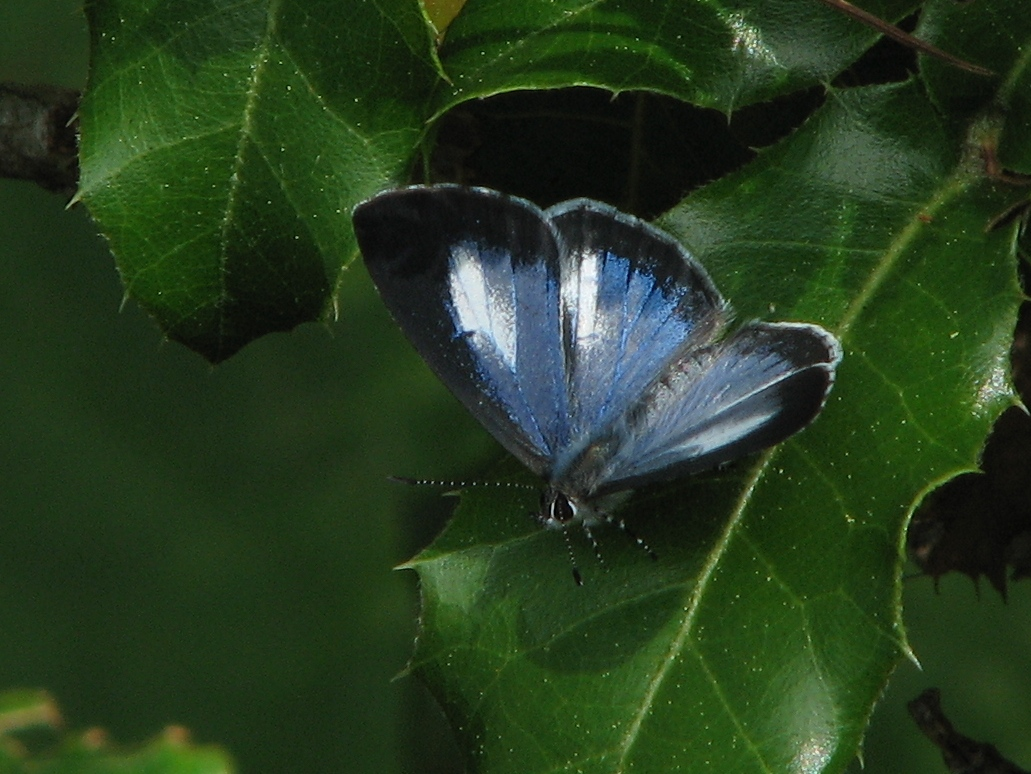

Scientific classification
- Domain: Eukaryota
- Kingdom: Animalia
- Phylum: Arthropoda
- Class: Insecta
- Order: Lepidoptera
- Family: Lycaenidae
- Genus: Lycaenopsis
- Species: L. marginata

Binomial name
- Lycaenopsis marginata (de Nicéville, 1884)

= Lycaenopsis marginata =

Margined hedge blue

Species of butterfly

Lycaenopsis marginata, the margined hedge blue, is a small butterfly found in India that belongs to the lycaenids or blues family.

== Description ==
Wet-season brood. Male upperside: black. Forewing: a posterior, medial, somewhat triangular area rich iridescent blue; the outer margin of this area passes from base through the middle of the cell to a little beyond the apex of the latter, then curves sharply round and is continued obliquely to the dorsum at about two-thirds of the distance from base to tornus; outwardly this area is pure white, the discocellulars marked with a slender black tooth. Hindwing: with a similar but more sharply triangular and somewhat dusky blue area limited by the broad black border on the costal margin that occupies fully the anterior third of the wing, is curved sharply round at the apex and forms a somewhat narrower border to the termen; posteriorly the dorsum is still more narrowly dusky black; superposed on the terminal black border is a curved series of small bluish lunules, each lunule outwardly margined by an intense black spot of a shade darker than the black along the termen. Underside: white with a faint bluish tint. Forewing: with the following fuscous-black markings: a line on the discocellulars, a transverse outer discal series of spots or short bars one in each interspace, the spot in interspace 3 pointing obliquely outwards, that in interspace 4 still more oblique, forms an angle with the one above it, lastly the spot in interspace 6 shifted well inwards; a postdiscal slightly curved line of transverse lunules, succeeded by a subterminal series of spots and a very slender anteciliary line. Hindwing: a black spot close to base on the dorsal margin succeeded by a transverse series of three conspicuous black spots, with a still more conspicuous rounded similar spot farther outwards about the middle of the costa; a line on the discocellulars, some irregularly placed spots on the disc and postdiscal, subterminal and anteciliary markings as on the forewing. Cilia of both forewings and hindwings bluish white. Antennae block, the shafts ringed with white, club tipped with ochraceous; head, thorax and abdomen black; beneath: the palpi, thorax and abdomen white.

Female upperside: brownish black. Forewings and hindwings: the iridescent blue areas as in the male but very much more restricted; on the hindwing the subterminal curved series of bluish lunules barely indicated by similar markings of a shade paler than the ground colour; the deep black spots that margin the lunules on the outer side can only be seen in certain lights. Underside: as in the male but the markings broader and coarser, all of a rich brown, not fuscous-black or deep black colour.

Dry-season brood. Male closely resembles the male of the wet-season brood, but on the upperside the pale areas on both forewing and hindwing are of greater extent with more of while and less of the iridescent blue; This bluish-white area is especially extended on the hindwing, encroaching upwards on the dark ground colour. In some specimens of the males the black on the terminal margin on the hindwing is barely indicated near the apex, but there is a conspicuous subterminal series of black spots and a slender anteciliary black line. Underside: ground colour and markings similar to those in the wet-season form, but as a rule very slender and trending to obsolescence. In some specimens the markings are often very irregular, some (generally the discal) markings on the forewing are slender and prominent, while those on the hindwing arc slender and subobsolescent. Antenna, head, thorax and abdomen as in the wet-season form.

== Range ==
It is found from Kumaon in India to the Karens in Myanmar.

== See also ==
- List of butterflies of India
- List of butterflies of India (Lycaenidae)
