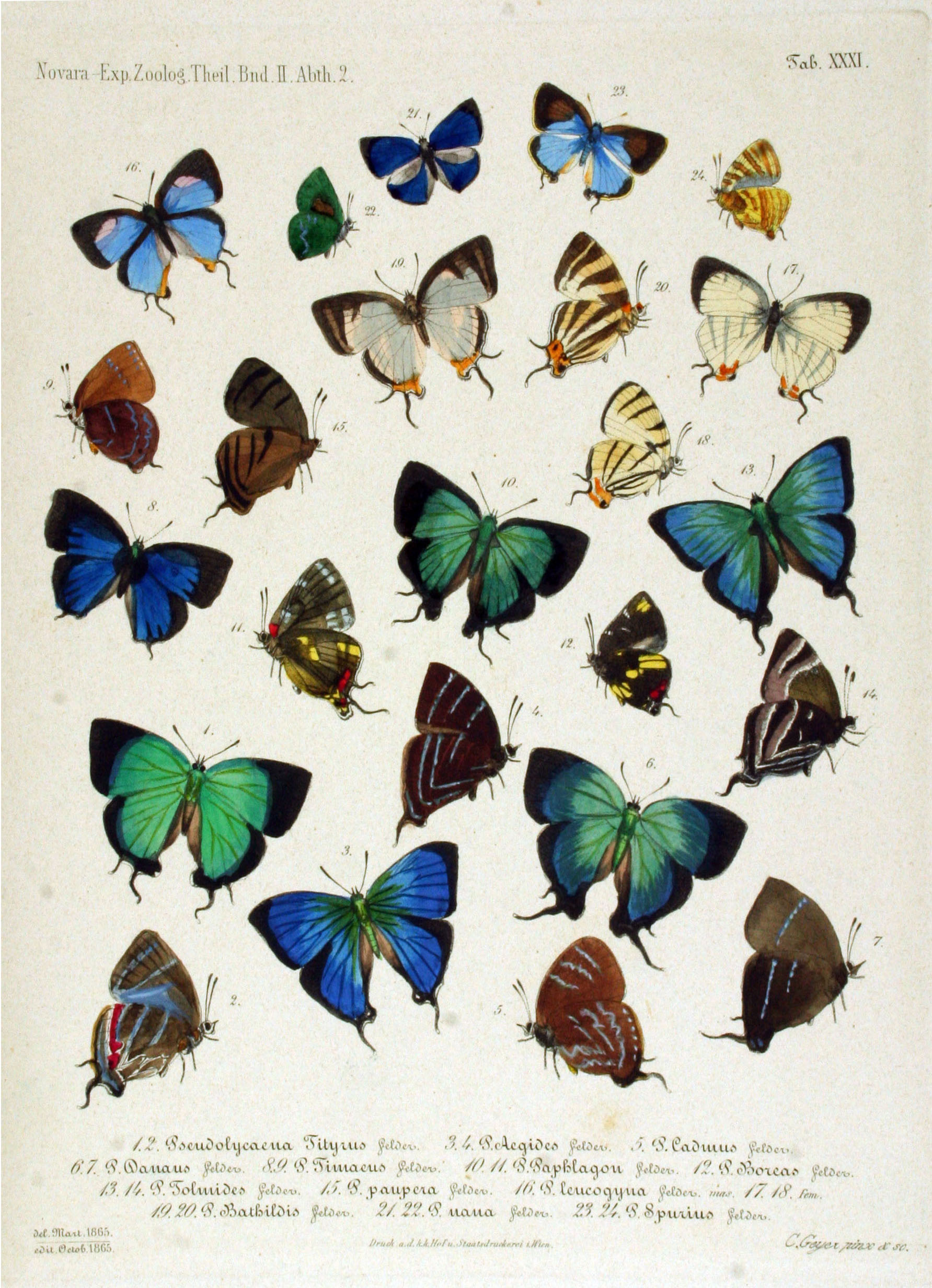
- Eumaeini collected by the Novara Expedition

Scientific classification
- Kingdom: Animalia
- Phylum: Arthropoda
- Clade: Pancrustacea
- Class: Insecta
- Order: Lepidoptera
- Family: Lycaenidae
- Subfamily: Theclinae
- Tribe: Eumaeini; Doubleday, 1847

Genera
- More than 80, see text

Synonyms
- Eumaeni; Eumaeinae; Strymonini

= Eumaeini =

Tribe of butterflies

The Eumaeini are a tribe of gossamer-winged butterflies (family Lycaenidae). They are typically placed in the subfamily Theclinae, but sometimes considered a separate subfamily Eumaeinae. Over 1,000 species are found in the Neotropical realm

== Systematics ==
As not all Theclinae have been assigned to tribes, the genus list is preliminary. However, much progress has been made in sorting out the profusion of synonymous taxa, and at least some degree of stability has been achieved in the early years of the 21st century. While there is no good phylogenetic hypothesis yet for the subfamily, groups of at least apparently related genera have been delimited. They are sometimes called "sections", but do not correspond to the taxonomic rank of section (the section in which the gossamer-winged butterflies are placed is the Cossina); if validated as clades and assigned taxonomic rank, they would qualify as subtribes.

There is still much work to be done, including the splitting of such notorious "wastebin taxa" as Callophrys, and the establishment of a robust phylogenetic and evolutionary scenario. Pending this, the groups are listed here in the presumed phylogenetic sequence, while genera are simply sorted alphabetically.

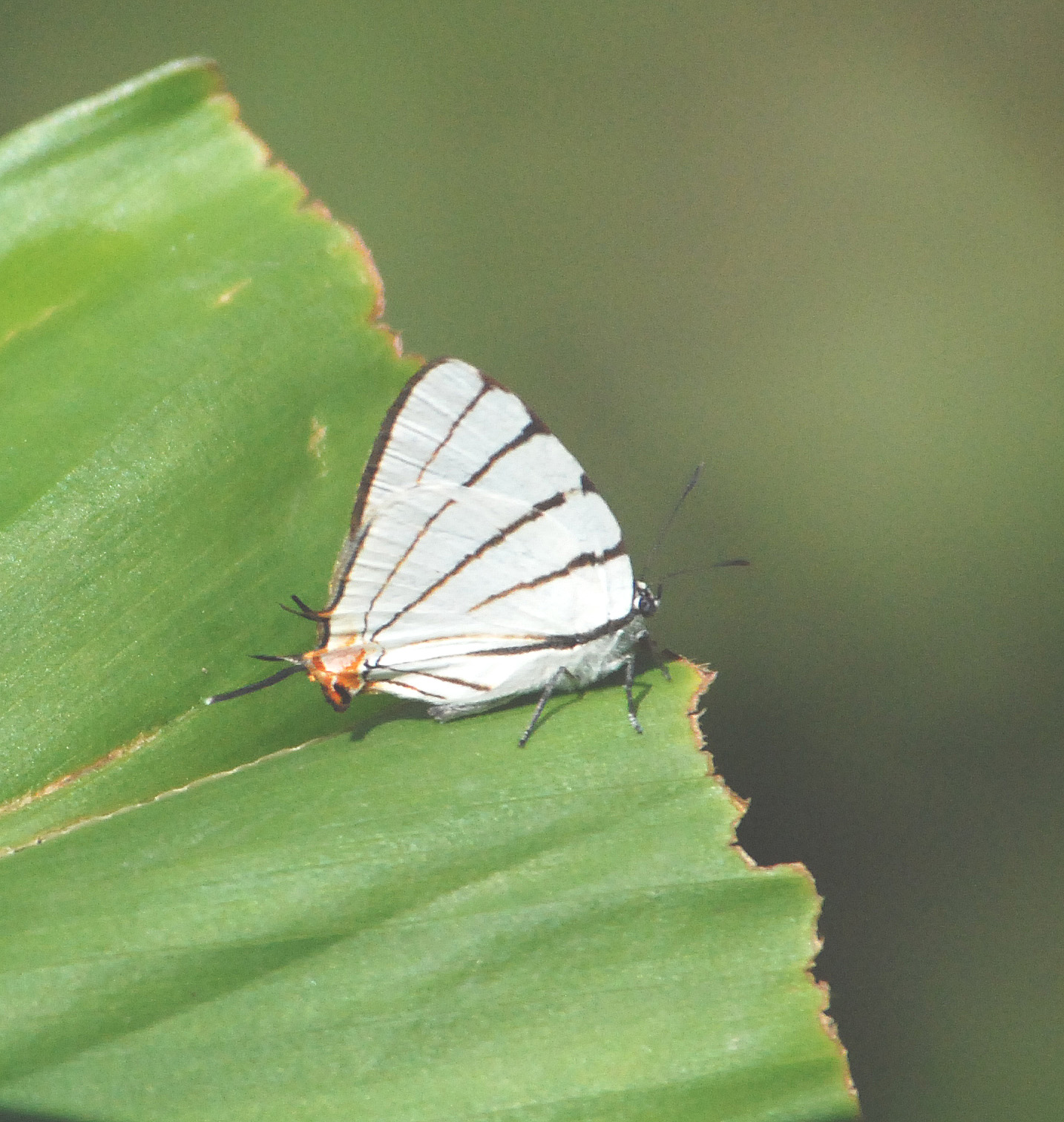
Fine-lined stripestreak (Arawacus sito) of the Thereus group

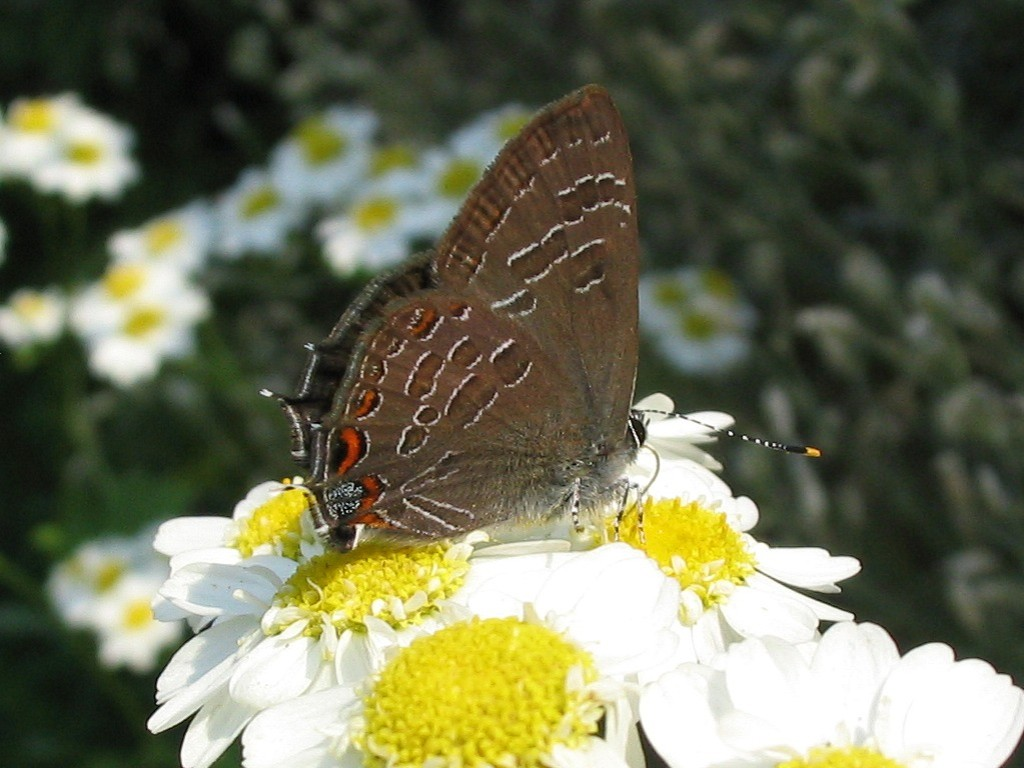
Striped hairstreak (Satyrium liparops) of the Satyrium group

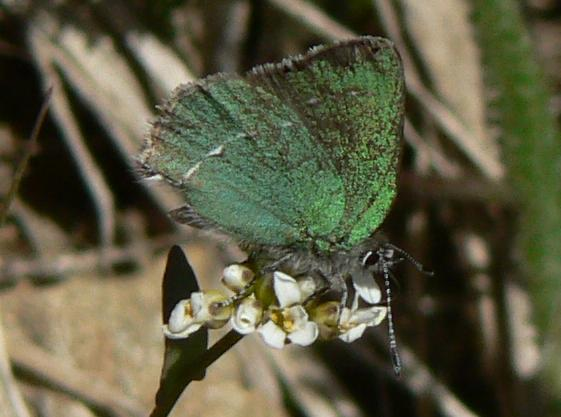
Sheridan's hairstreak (Callophrys sheridanii) of the Callophrys group

Eumaeus group

- Eumaeus
- Mithras
- Paiwarria (including Fasslantonius)
- Paraspiculatus
- Theorema

Brangas group

- Brangas
- Dabreras
- Enos (including Chopinia, Falerinota)
- Evenus (including Cryptaenota, Endymion, Ipocia, etc.)
- Lamasina (= Annamaria)
- Thaeides

Atlides group

- Arcas
- Atlides (including Riojana)
- Pseudolycaena
- Theritas (including Aveexcrenota, Denivia, Lucilda, etc.)

Micandra group (formerly in Atlides group)

- Brevianta
- Busbiina
- Ianusanta
- Ipidecla
- Johnsonita
- Micandra (including Egides)
- Penaincisalia (including Abloxurina, Candora, etc.)
- Phothecla
- Podanotum
- Rhamma (including Paralustrus, Pontirama, Shapiroana)
- Salazaria
- Temecla
- Timaeta (including Jagiello, Trochusinus)

Thereus group

- Arawacus – stripestreaks
- Contrafacia
- Kolana
- Rekoa
- Thereus (including Noreena, Pedusa)

Satyrium group

- Chlorostrymon
- Magnastigma
- Ocaria (including Lamasa, Variegatta)
- Satyrium (including Harkenclenus, Neolycaena, etc.)

Callophrys group

- Callophrys (including Incisalia, Mitoura, Xamia, etc.) – green hairstreaks and elfins
- Cyanophrys

Thestius group

- Bistonina
- Megathecla (including Cupathecla, Gullicaena)
- Lathecla
- Thestius

Allosmaitia group

- Allosmaitia
- Janthecla
- Laothus

Lamprospilus group (groundstreaks and allies)

- Arumecla
- Calycopis (including Calystryma, Femniterga, etc.)
- Camissecla
- Electrostrymon (including Angulopis)
- Lamprospilus
- Ziegleria (including Kisutam)

Strymon group (scrub hairstreaks)

- Strymon (including Eiseliana)

Tmolus group

- Exorbaetta
- Gargina
- Ministrymon
- Nicolaea
- Ostrinotes
- Siderus
- Strephonota (including Dindyminotes, Letizia, etc.)
- Theclopsis (including Asymbiopsis)
- Tmolus

Panthiades group

- Beatheclus Bálint & Dahners, 2006
- Ignata
- Michaelus
- Oenomaus
- Olynthus
- Panthiades (including Cycnus)
- Parrhasius
- Porthecla
- Thepytus

Hypostrymon group

- Apuecla
- Aubergina
- Balintus
- Celmia (including Cyclotrichia)
- Dicya (including Caerofethra)
- Hypostrymon
- Iaspis
- Marachina
- Nesiostrymon
- Terenthina
- Trichonis

Erora group

- Erora
- Chalybs
- Semonina
- Symbiopsis

Unplaced (TOL)

- Badecla
