= List of lycaenid genera: M =

The large butterfly family Lycaenidae contains the following genera starting with the letter M:

- Madeleinea
- Magnastigma
- Mahathala
- Mambara
- Maneca
- Manto
- Mantoides
- Marachina
- Matsutaroa
- Maurus
- Megalopalpus
- Megathecla
- Megisba
- Melanolycaena
- Mesocyanophrys
- Micandra
- Michaelus
- Micropentila
- Micropsyche
- Miletus
- Mimacraea
- Mimeresia
- Ministrymon
- Mirzakhania
- Mithras
- Monodontides
- Mota
- Myrina
