= List of lycaenid genera: T =

The large butterfly family Lycaenidae contains the following genera starting with the letter T:

- Tajuria
- Talicada
- Taraka
- Tartesa
- Tarucus
- Telipna
- Temecla
- Teratoneura
- Teratozephyrus
- Terenthina
- Teriomima
- Terra
- Tetrarhanis
- Thaduka
- Thaeides
- Thamala
- Thaumaina
- Thecla
- Theclinesthes
- Theclopsis
- Theorema
- Thepytus
- Thereus
- Theritas
- Thermoniphas
- Thermozephyrus
- Thestius
- Thestor
- Thrix
- Ticherra
- Tigrinota
- Timaeta
- Titea
- Tmolus
- Tomares
- Tongeia
- Toxochitona
- Trichiolaus
- Trichonis
- Trimenia
- Tumerepedes
- Turanana
- Tuxentius
- Tylopaedia
