= List of lycaenid genera: J =

The large butterfly family Lycaenidae contains the following genera starting with the letter J:

- Jacoona
- Jalmenus
- Jameela
- Jamides
- Janthecla
- Japonica
- Johnsonita
