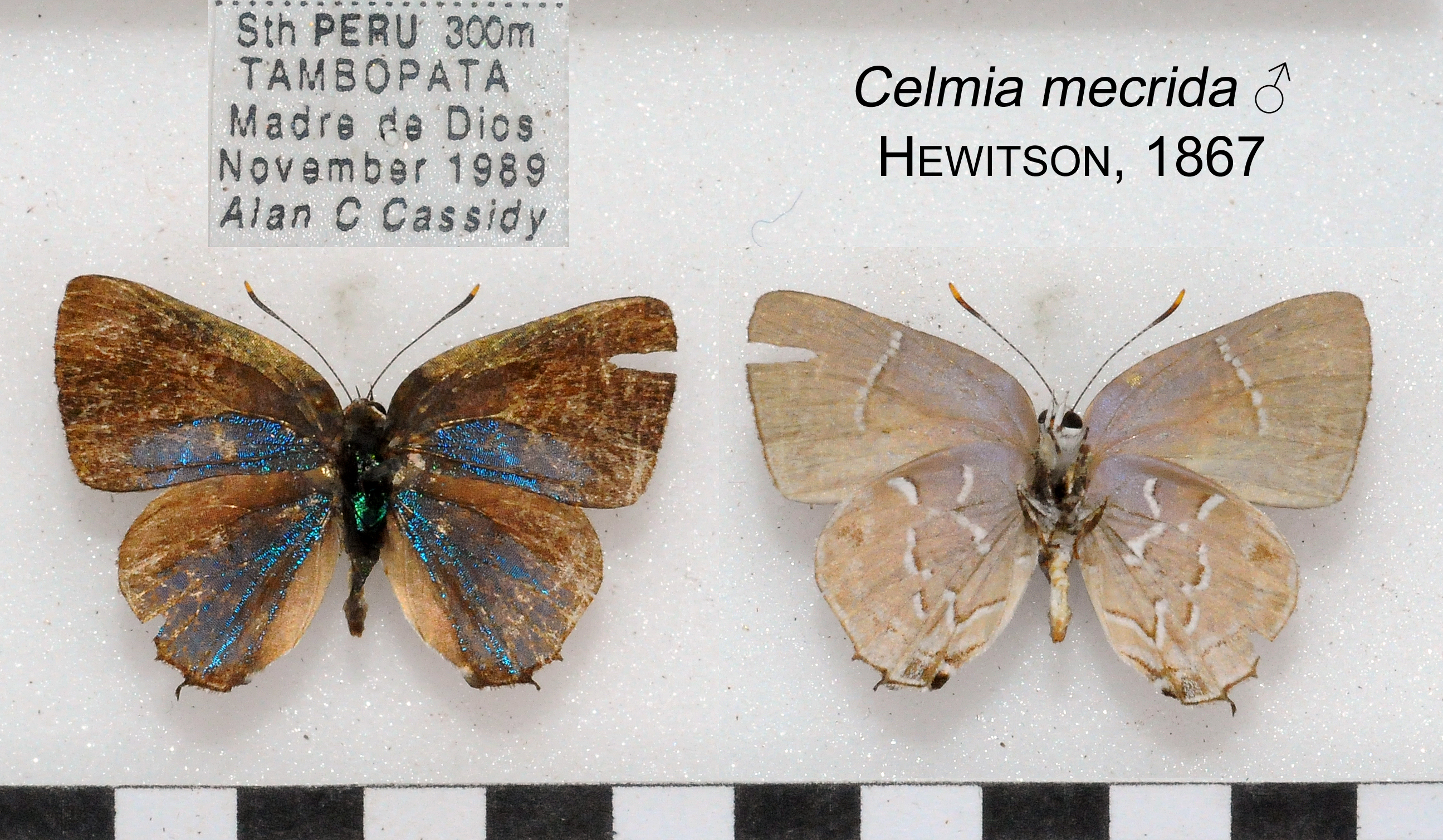
- Celmia mecrida

Scientific classification
- Domain: Eukaryota
- Kingdom: Animalia
- Phylum: Arthropoda
- Class: Insecta
- Order: Lepidoptera
- Family: Lycaenidae
- Tribe: Eumaeini
- Genus: Celmia; K. Johnson, 1991

Synonyms
- Uzzia K. Johnson, 1991; Cyclotrichia K. Johnson, Austin, Le Crom & Salazar, 1997

= Celmia =

Butterfly genus in family Lycaenidae

Celmia is a Neotropical genus of butterflies in the family Lycaenidae.

== Species ==
- Celmia celmus (Cramer, [1775]) Mexico to Amazonas, Colombia, Surinam
- Celmia uzza (Hewitson, 1873) Brazil
- Celmia color (Druce, 1907) French Guiana, Brazil
- Celmia mecrida (Hewitson, 1867) Brazil
- Celmia anastomosis (Draudt, [1918]) French Guiana, Brazil
- Celmia conoveria (Schaus, 1902) Brazil
