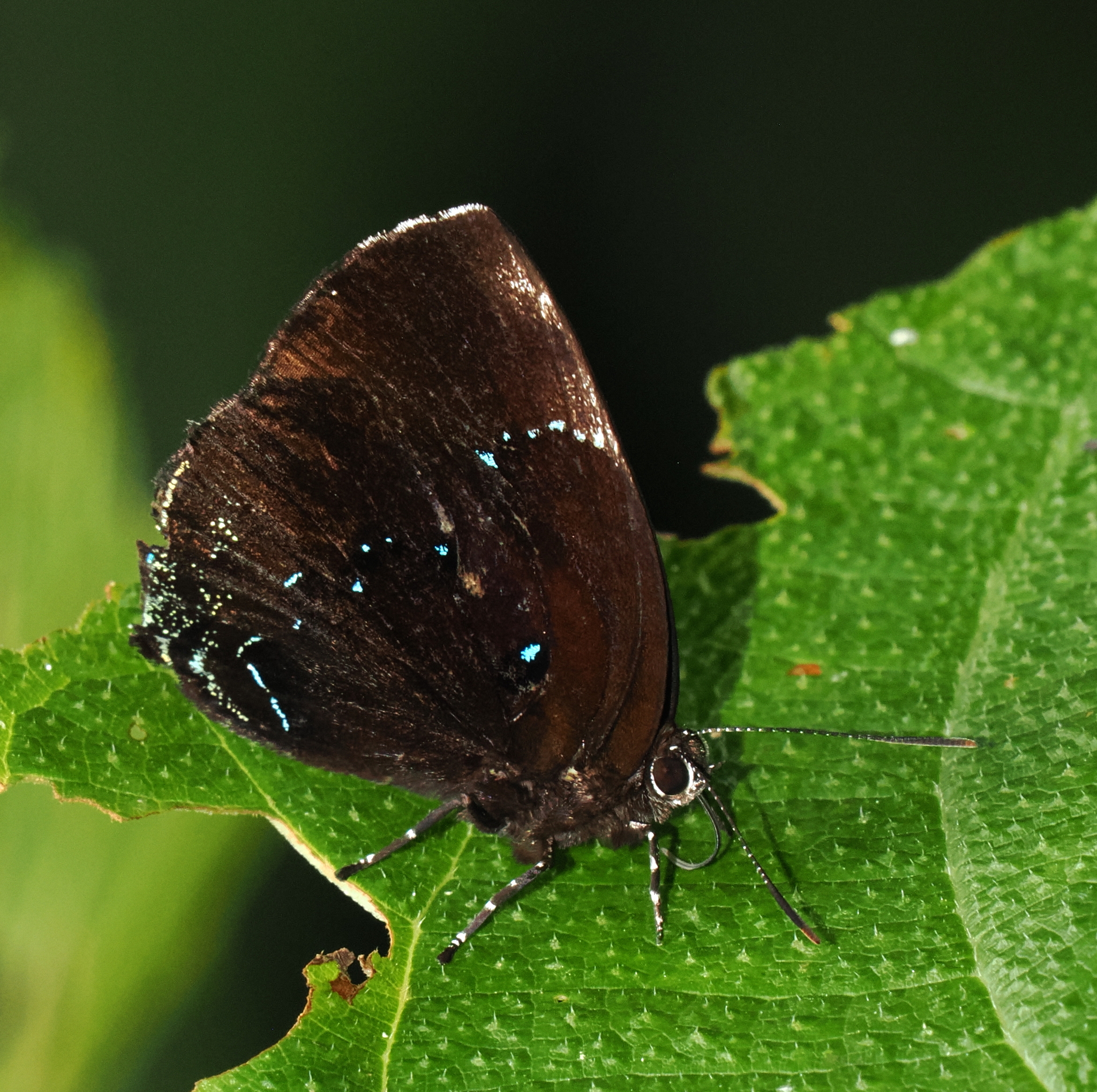
- Paraspiculatus grande

Scientific classification
- Kingdom: Animalia
- Phylum: Arthropoda
- Clade: Pancrustacea
- Class: Insecta
- Order: Lepidoptera
- Family: Lycaenidae
- Tribe: Eumaeini
- Subtribe: Timaetina
- Genus: Paraspiculatus; Johnson & Constantino, 1997

= Paraspiculatus =

Genus of butterflies

Paraspiculatus is a genus of butterflies in the family Lycaenidae. Species of the genus are found in montane habitats in the Andes of South America.

== Taxonomy and characteristics ==
The genus Paraspiculatus was established by Kurt Johnson and Luis Miguel Constantino in 1997 and belongs to the tribe Eumaeini, within the butterfly family Lycaenidae. A taxonomic study published in 2001 by Zsolt Bálint and Alfred Moser revised the genus using characteristics of the female genitalia. A subsequent revision published by the Smithsonian Institution in 2017 examined wing patterns, reproductive structures and mitochondrial DNA sequences. The researchers noted that males exhibit limited variation in genital structures and lack distinctive secondary sexual traits, making wing patterns particularly important for distinguishing members of the genus.

== Species ==
The following species are recognised in the genus Paraspiculatus:

Species complex Paraspiculatus elis

- Paraspiculatus elis (Cramer, 1779)

Species complex Paraspiculatus catrea

- Paraspiculatus catrea (Hewitson, 1874)
- Paraspiculatus vossoroca Bálint and Moser, 2001

Species complex Paraspiculatus oroanna

- Paraspiculatus oroanna Bálint, 2002

Species complex Paraspiculatus apuya

- Paraspiculatus apuya Busby & Robbins, 2017

Species complex Paraspiculatus hannelore

- Paraspiculatus hannelore Bálint & Moser, 2001

Species complex Paraspiculatus orobia

- Paraspiculatus cosmo Busby, Robbins, and Faynel, 2017
- Paraspiculatus orobia (Hewitson, 1867)

Species complex Paraspiculatus orobiana

- Paraspiculatus orobiana (Hewitson, 1867)

Species complex Paraspiculatus transvesta

- Paraspiculatus transvesta Robbins & Busby, 2017)

Species complex Paraspiculatus orocana

- Paraspiculatus grande Busby, Robbins, and Moser
- Paraspiculatus honor Busby, Robbins, and Hall, 2017
- Paraspiculatus orocana (H. H. Druce, 1912)

Paraspiculatus colombiensis

- Paraspiculatus emma Busby & Robbins, 2017
- Paraspiculatus sine Busby & Robbins, 2017
- Paraspiculatus colombiensis Johnson and Constantino, 1997
- Paraspiculatus azul Busby, Robbins, and Faynel, 2017
- Paraspiculatus lilyana Busby & Robbins, 2017
- Paraspiculatus noemi Busby & Robbins, 2017
