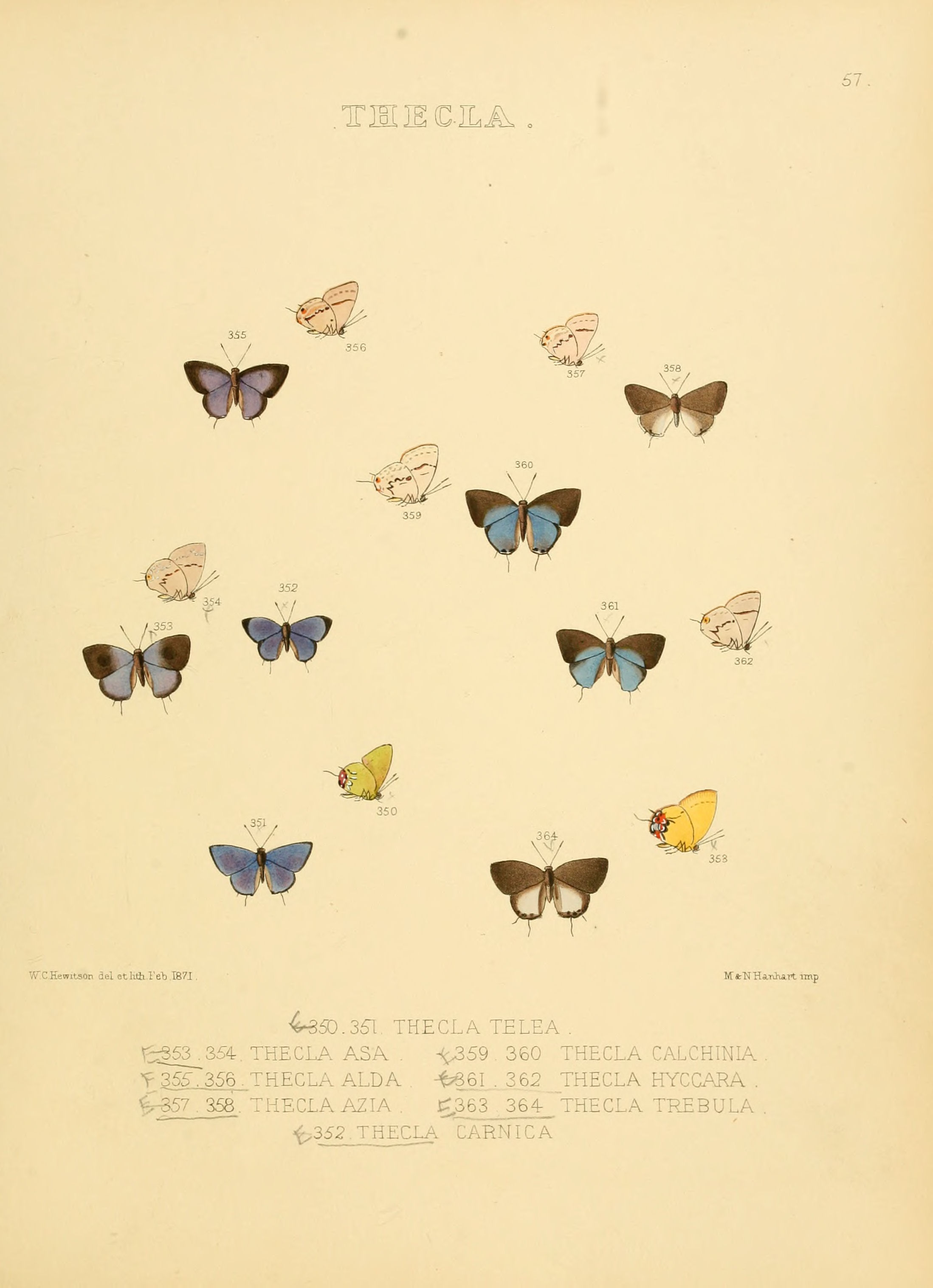
- Hypostrymon asa, figures 353 and 354

Scientific classification
- Kingdom: Animalia
- Phylum: Arthropoda
- Clade: Pancrustacea
- Class: Insecta
- Order: Lepidoptera
- Family: Lycaenidae
- Tribe: Eumaeini
- Genus: Hypostrymon; Clench, 1961

= Hypostrymon =

Butterfly genus in family Lycaenidae

Hypostrymon is a Nearctic and Neotropical genus of butterflies in the family Lycaenidae.

== Species ==
- Hypostrymon critola (Hewitson, 1874) – Sonoran hairstreak
- Hypostrymon renidens (Draudt, 1920)
- Hypostrymon aepeona (Draudt, 1920)
- Hypostrymon asa (Hewitson, 1868)
