= Dabreras =

Scientific classification
- Domain: Eukaryota
- Kingdom: Animalia
- Phylum: Arthropoda
- Class: Insecta
- Order: Lepidoptera
- Family: Lycaenidae
- Subfamily: Theclinae
- Tribe: Eumaeini
- Genus: Dabreras; Bálint, in Bálint & Faynel, 2008
- Species: D. teucria

Binomial name
- Dabreras teucria (Hewitson, 1868)

Synonyms
- Thecla teucria Hewitson, 1868

Genus of butterflies

Dabreras is a Neotropical butterfly genus in the family Lycaenidae. The genus is monotypic containing the single species Dabreras teucria, which is found from Venezuela to Peru and Brazil.
