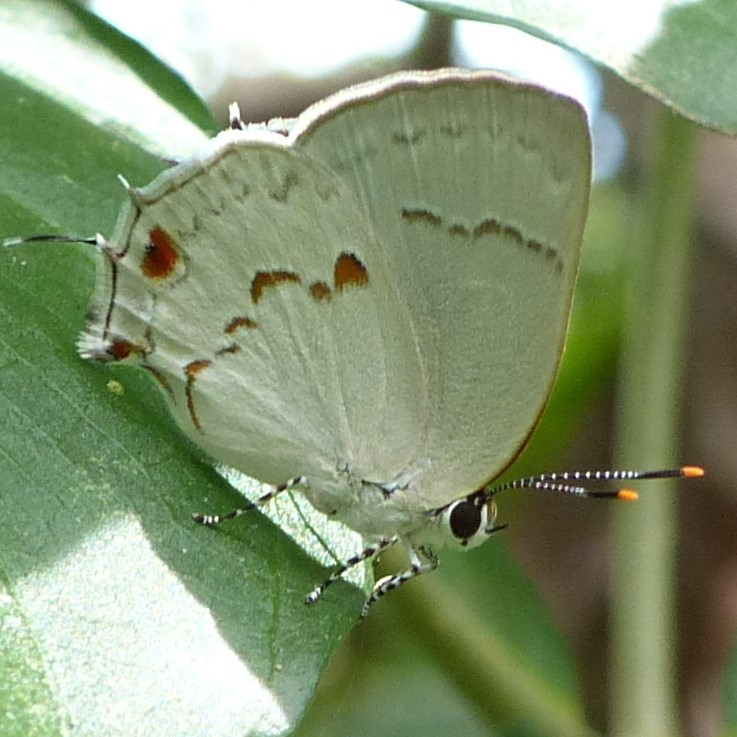

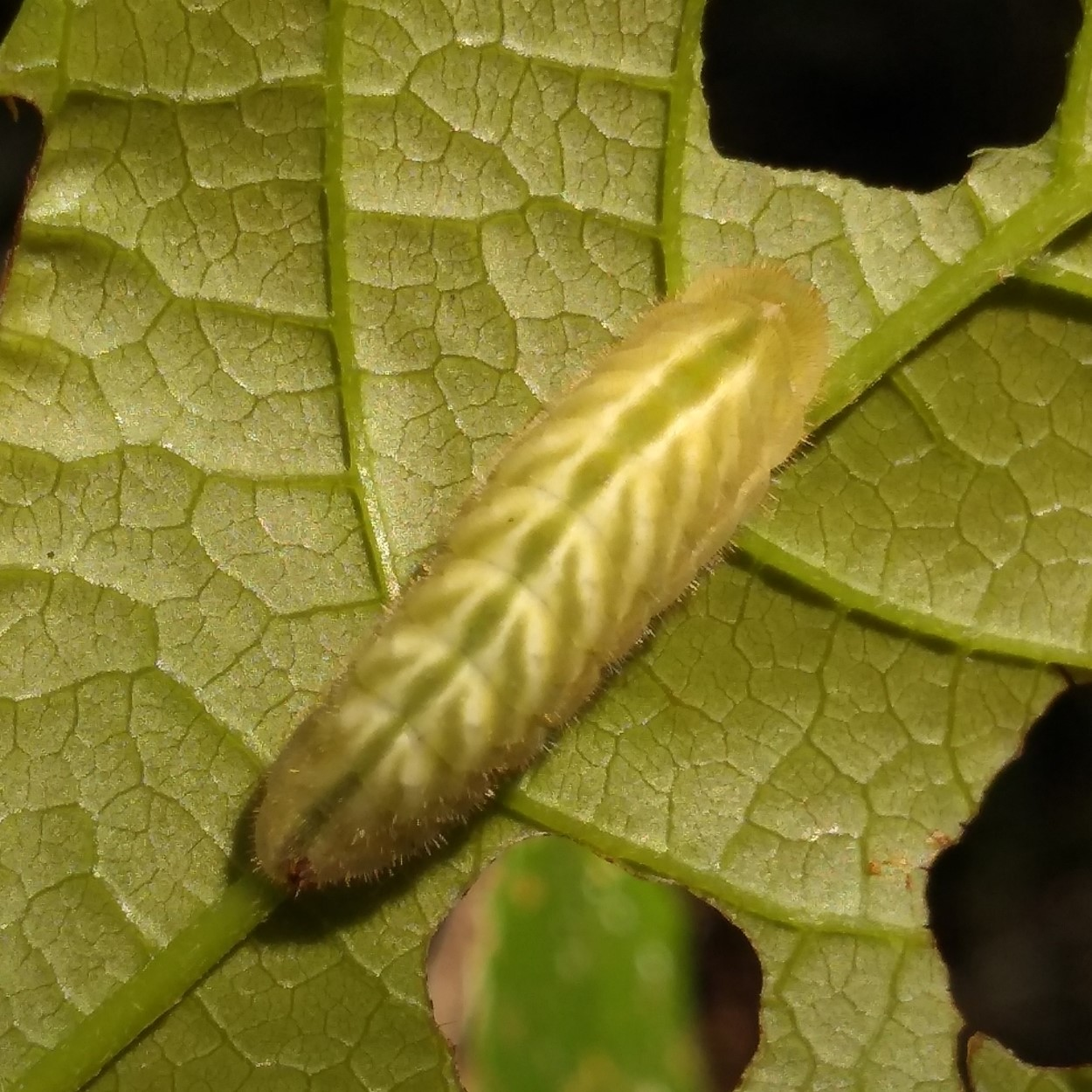
- Siderus philinna adult (top) and larva (bottom)

Scientific classification
- Kingdom: Animalia
- Phylum: Arthropoda
- Clade: Pancrustacea
- Class: Insecta
- Order: Lepidoptera
- Family: Lycaenidae
- Tribe: Eumaeini
- Genus: Siderus; Kaye, 1904

= Siderus =

Butterfly genus in family Lycaenidae

Siderus is a Neotropical genus of butterflies in the family Lycaenidae.

== Species ==
- Siderus leucophaeus (Hübner, 1818)
- Siderus parvinotus Kaye, 1904
- Siderus guapila (Schaus, 1913)
- Siderus eliatha (Hewitson, 1867)
- Siderus bouvieri (Lathy, 1936)
- Siderus athymbra (Hewitson, 1867)
- Siderus philinna (Hewitson, 1868)
- Siderus giapor (Schaus, 1902)
