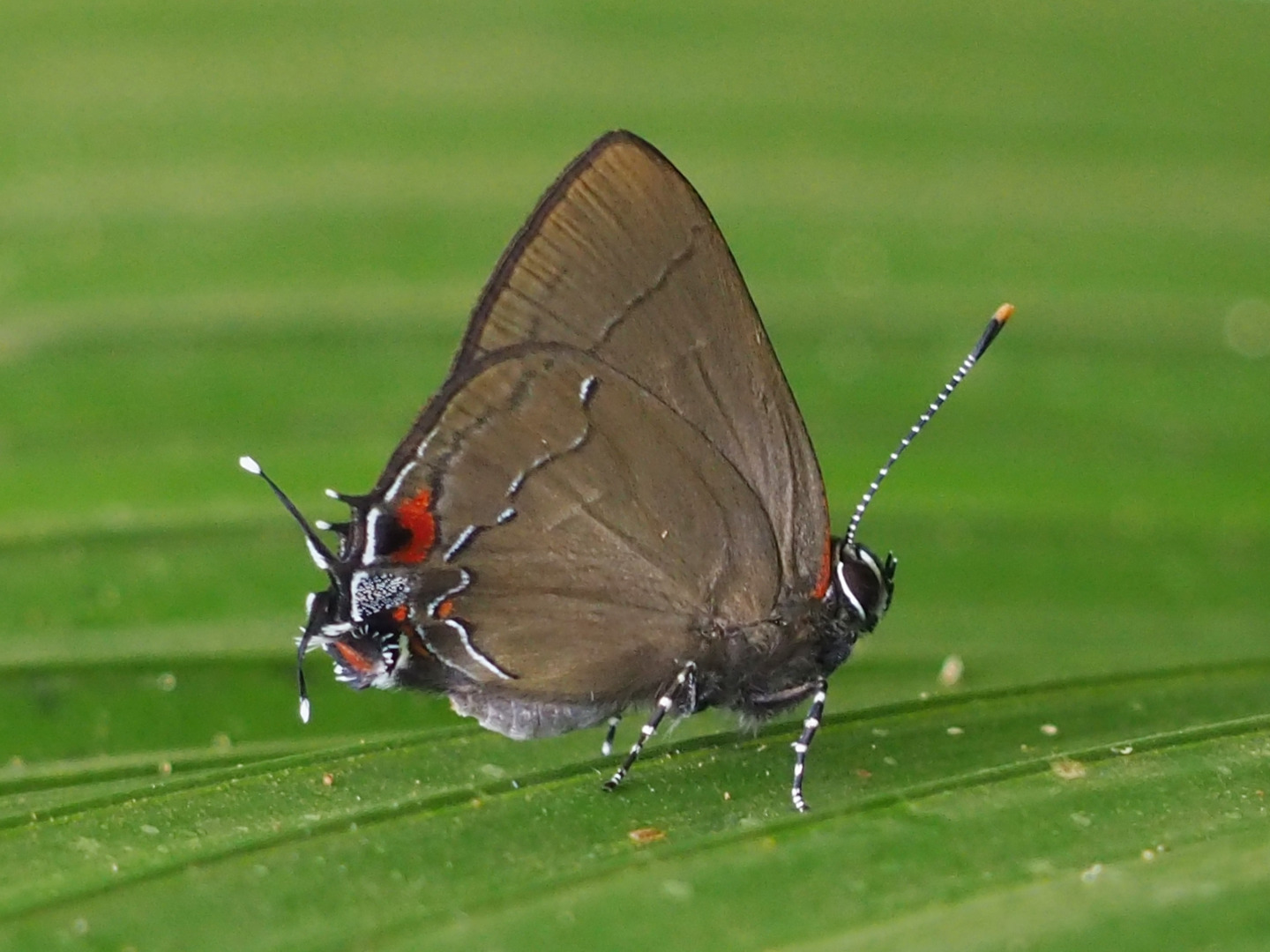
- Arumecla galliena

Scientific classification
- Kingdom: Animalia
- Phylum: Arthropoda
- Clade: Pancrustacea
- Class: Insecta
- Order: Lepidoptera
- Family: Lycaenidae
- Tribe: Eumaeini
- Genus: Arumecla; Robbins & Duarte, 2004

= Arumecla =

Butterfly genus in family Lycaenidae

Arumecla is a Neotropical genus of butterflies in the family Lycaenidae.

== Species ==
- Arumecla aruma (Hewitson, 1877)
- Arumecla galliena (Hewitson, 1877)
- Arumecla netesca (Draudt, 1920)
- Arumecla nisaee (Godman & Salvin, [1887])
