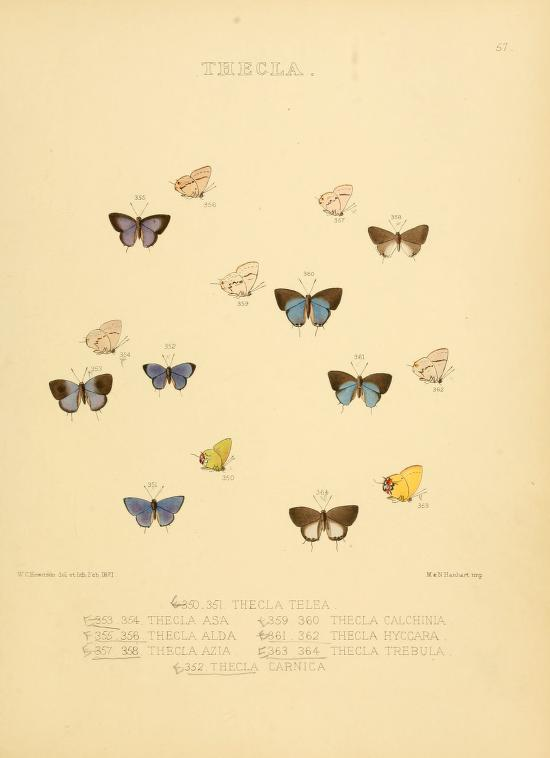
- Dicya carnica, figure 352

Scientific classification
- Domain: Eukaryota
- Kingdom: Animalia
- Phylum: Arthropoda
- Class: Insecta
- Order: Lepidoptera
- Family: Lycaenidae
- Tribe: Eumaeini
- Genus: Dicya; K. Johnson, 1991

Synonyms
- Caerofethra Johnson, 1991

= Dicya =

Butterfly genus in family Lycaenidae

Dicya is a genus of butterflies in the family Lycaenidae. The species of this genus are found in the Neotropical realm.

== Species ==
- Dicya dicaea (Hewitson, 1874) Brazil, Paraguay
- Dicya carnica (Hewitson, 1873) Mexico to Brazil (Amazonas), Bolivia
- Dicya iambe (Godman & Salvin, [1887]) Costa Rica, Bolivia, Ecuador
- Dicya eumorpha (Hayward, 1949) Argentina
- Dicya lucagus (Godman & Salvin, [1887]) Mexico
- Dicya lollia (Godman & Salvin, [1887]) Guatemala, Costa Rica
