= Ianusanta =

Scientific classification
- Domain: Eukaryota
- Kingdom: Animalia
- Phylum: Arthropoda
- Class: Insecta
- Order: Lepidoptera
- Family: Lycaenidae
- Tribe: Eumaeini
- Genus: Ianusanta; Bálint, 2011
- Species: I. ianusi

Binomial name
- Ianusanta ianusi Bálint, 2011

Genus of butterflies

Ianusanta is a Neotropical butterfly genus in the family Lycaenidae. The genus is monotypic containing the single species Ianusanta ianusi from Peru.
