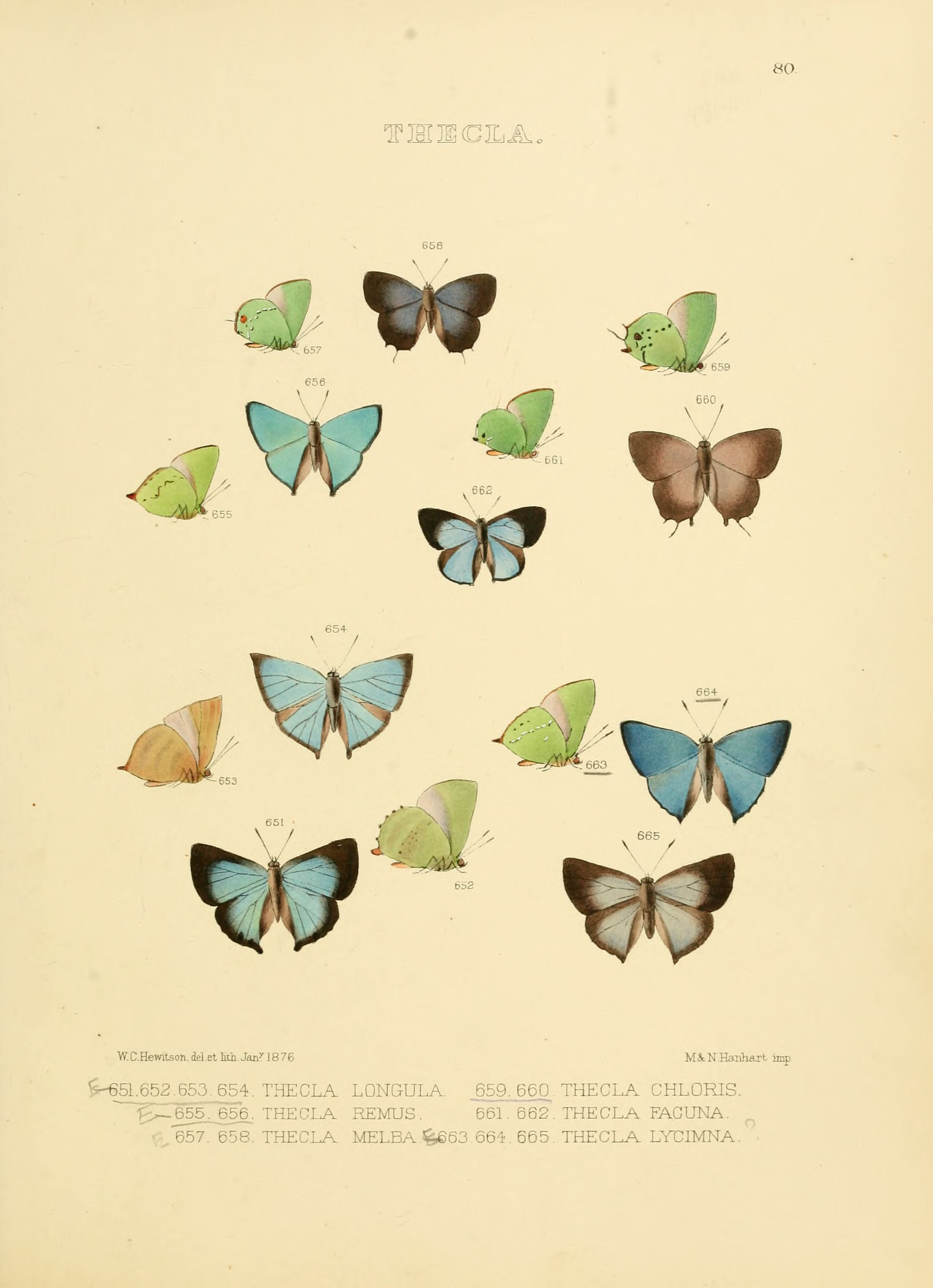
- Chalybs chloris, figs. 659 and 660

Scientific classification
- Kingdom: Animalia
- Phylum: Arthropoda
- Clade: Pancrustacea
- Class: Insecta
- Order: Lepidoptera
- Family: Lycaenidae
- Tribe: Eumaeini
- Genus: Chalybs; Hübner, 1819

= Chalybs =

Neotropical genus of butterflies

Chalybs is a Neotropical genus of butterflies in the family Lycaenidae.

== Species ==
The genus Chalybs includes:

- Chalybs cecina (Hewitson, 1868) Mexico to Colombia, Venezuela
- Chalybs chloris (Hewitson, 1877) Brazil (Southeastern)
- Chalybs hassan (Stoll, [1790]) Mexico to Colombia, Brazil, Guyanas
- Chalybs janias (Cramer, [1779]) Mexico to Bolivia, Colombia, Ecuador, Guyanas, Peru, Venezuela,
- Chalybs lineata (Lathy, 1936) Ecuador
- Chalybs mitaraka Faynel, 2019 Venezuela, Guyanas
