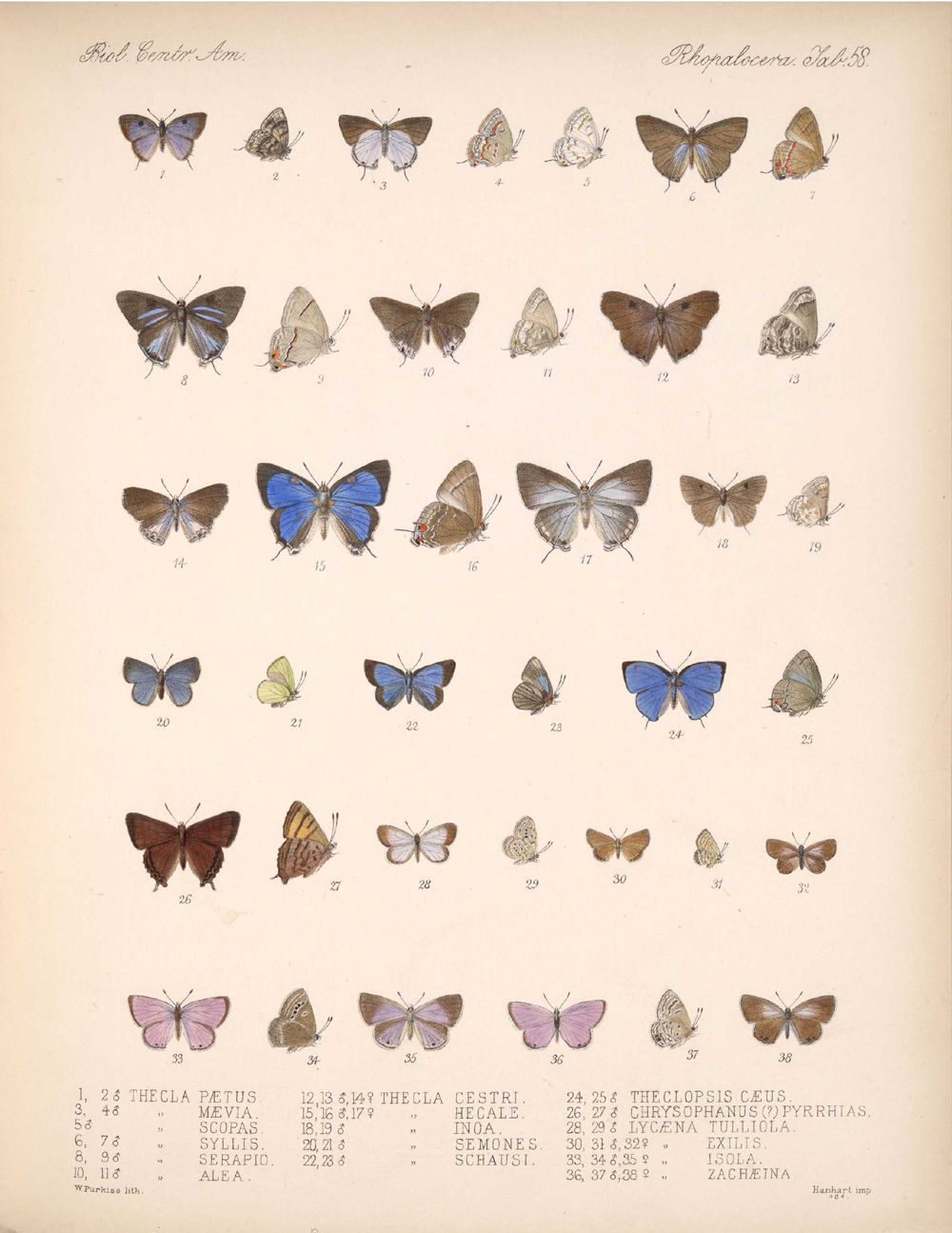
- Semonina semones, figures 20 and 21

Scientific classification
- Domain: Eukaryota
- Kingdom: Animalia
- Phylum: Arthropoda
- Class: Insecta
- Order: Lepidoptera
- Family: Lycaenidae
- Tribe: Eumaeini
- Genus: Semonina; Robbins, 2004

= Semonina =

Butterfly genus in family Lycaenidae

Semonina is a genus of butterflies in the family Lycaenidae. The species of this genus are found in the Neotropical realm.

== Species ==
- Semonina ares (Godman & Salvin, [1887])
- Semonina semones (Godman & Salvin, [1887])
