= Badecla =

Scientific classification
- Kingdom: Animalia
- Phylum: Arthropoda
- Class: Insecta
- Order: Lepidoptera
- Family: Lycaenidae
- Tribe: Eumaeini
- Genus: Badecla; Duarte & Robbins, 2010

Genus of butterflies

Badecla is a Neotropical genus in the family Lycaenidae.

== Species ==
- Badecla argentinensis
- Badecla badaca (Hewitson, 1868)
- Badecla clarissa
- Badecla lanckena
- Badecla picentia (Hewitson, 1868)
- Badecla quadramacula (G.T. Austin & K. Johnson, 1997)
