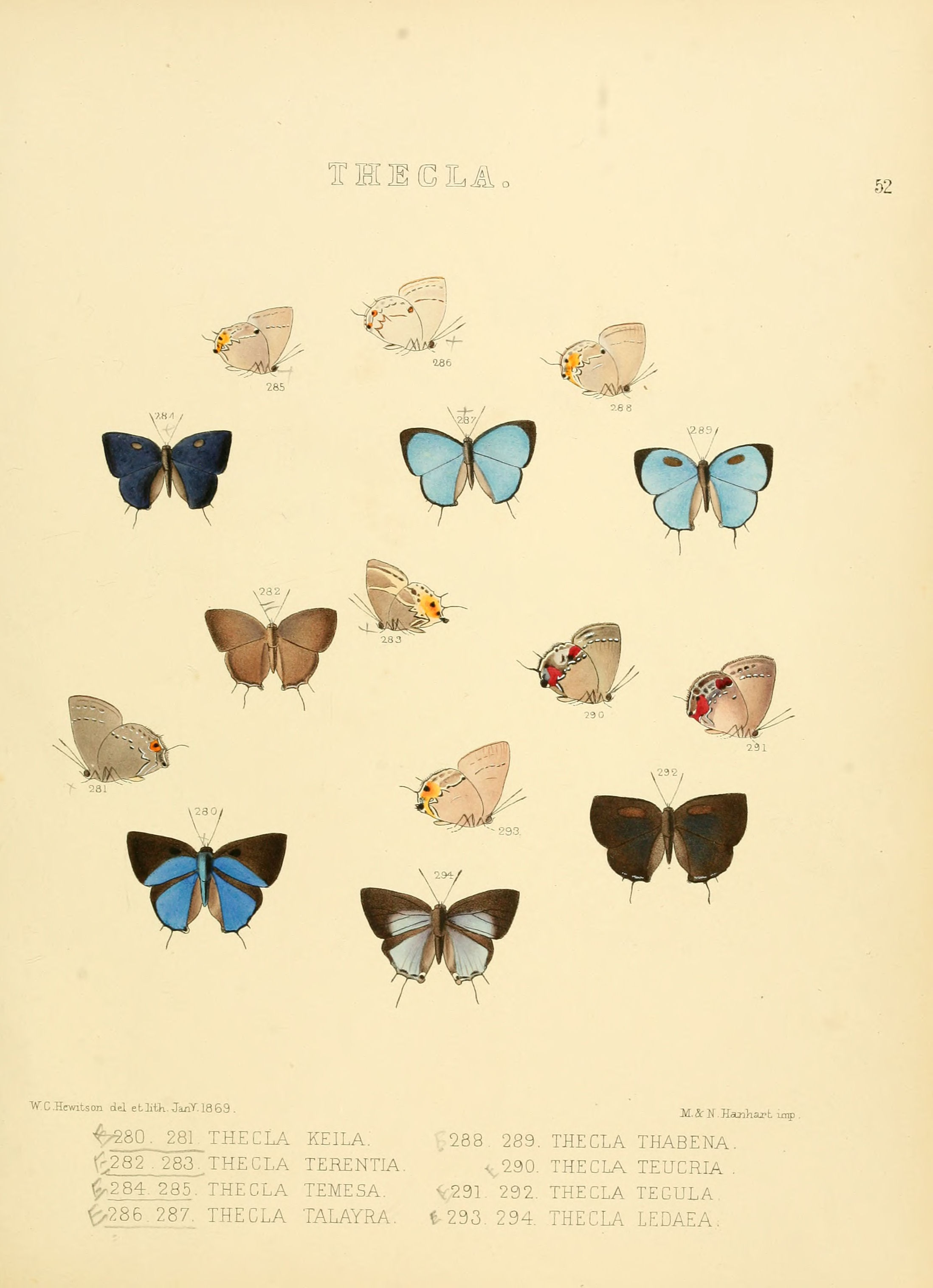
- Iaspis temesa, figures 284 and 285; Iaspis talayra, 286 and 287; Iaspis thabena, 288 and 289

Scientific classification
- Domain: Eukaryota
- Kingdom: Animalia
- Phylum: Arthropoda
- Class: Insecta
- Order: Lepidoptera
- Family: Lycaenidae
- Tribe: Eumaeini
- Genus: Iaspis; Kaye, 1904

= Iaspis =

Butterfly genus in family Lycaenidae

Iaspis is a Neotropical genus of butterflies in the family Lycaenidae.

== Species ==
- Iaspis verania (Hewitson, 1868)
- Iaspis ornata Austin & Johnson, 1996
- Iaspis castitas (Druce, 1907)
- Iaspis exiguus (Druce, 1907)
- Iaspis talayra (Hewitson, 1868)
- Iaspis castimonia (Druce, 1907)
- Iaspis thabena (Hewitson, 1868)
- Iaspis beera (Hewitson, 1870)
- Iaspis grandis Austin & Johnson, 1996
- Iaspis temesa (Hewitson, 1868)
- Iaspis andersoni (Robbins, 2010)

== Gallery ==
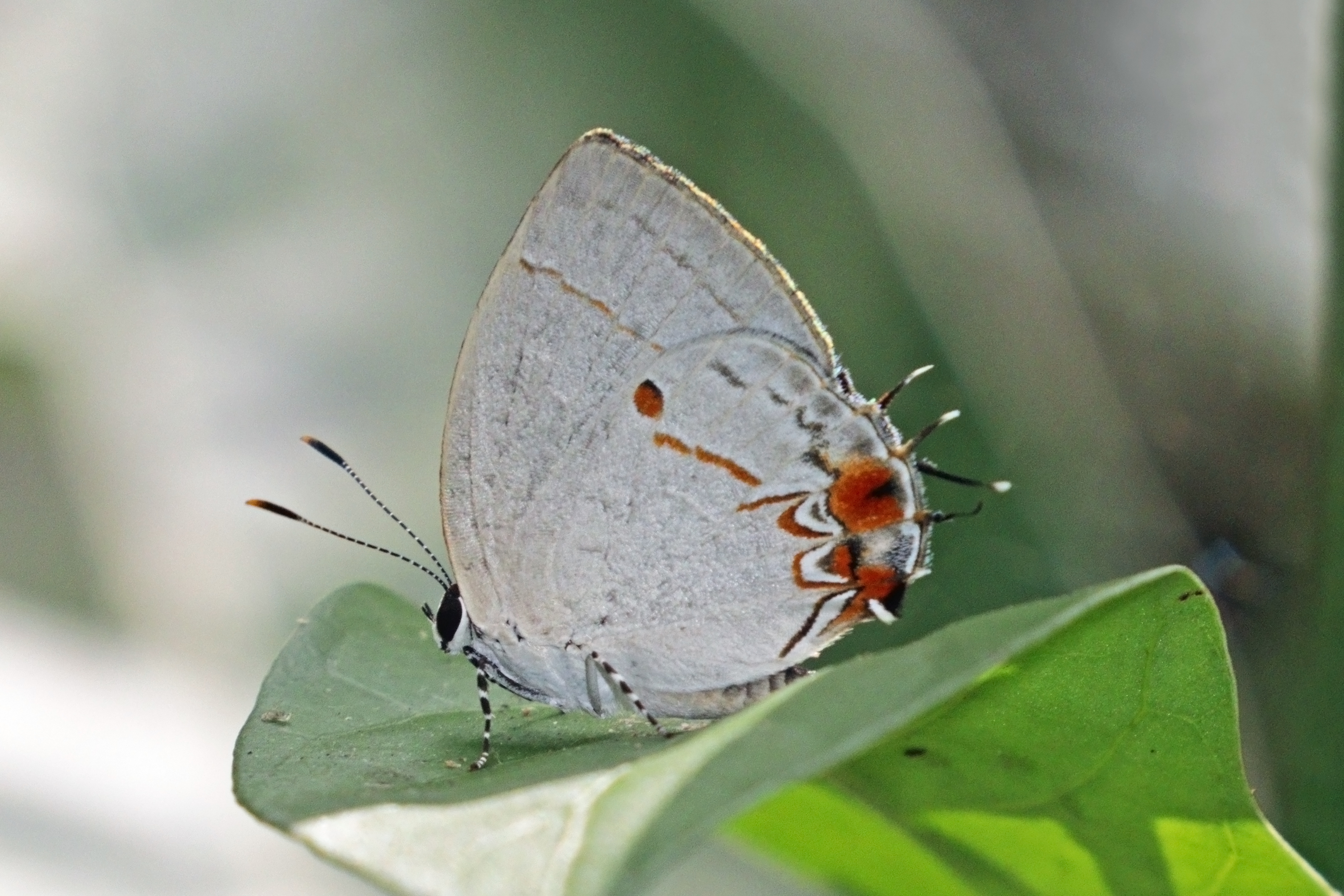
Anderson's hairstreak
Iaspis andersoni, Panama
