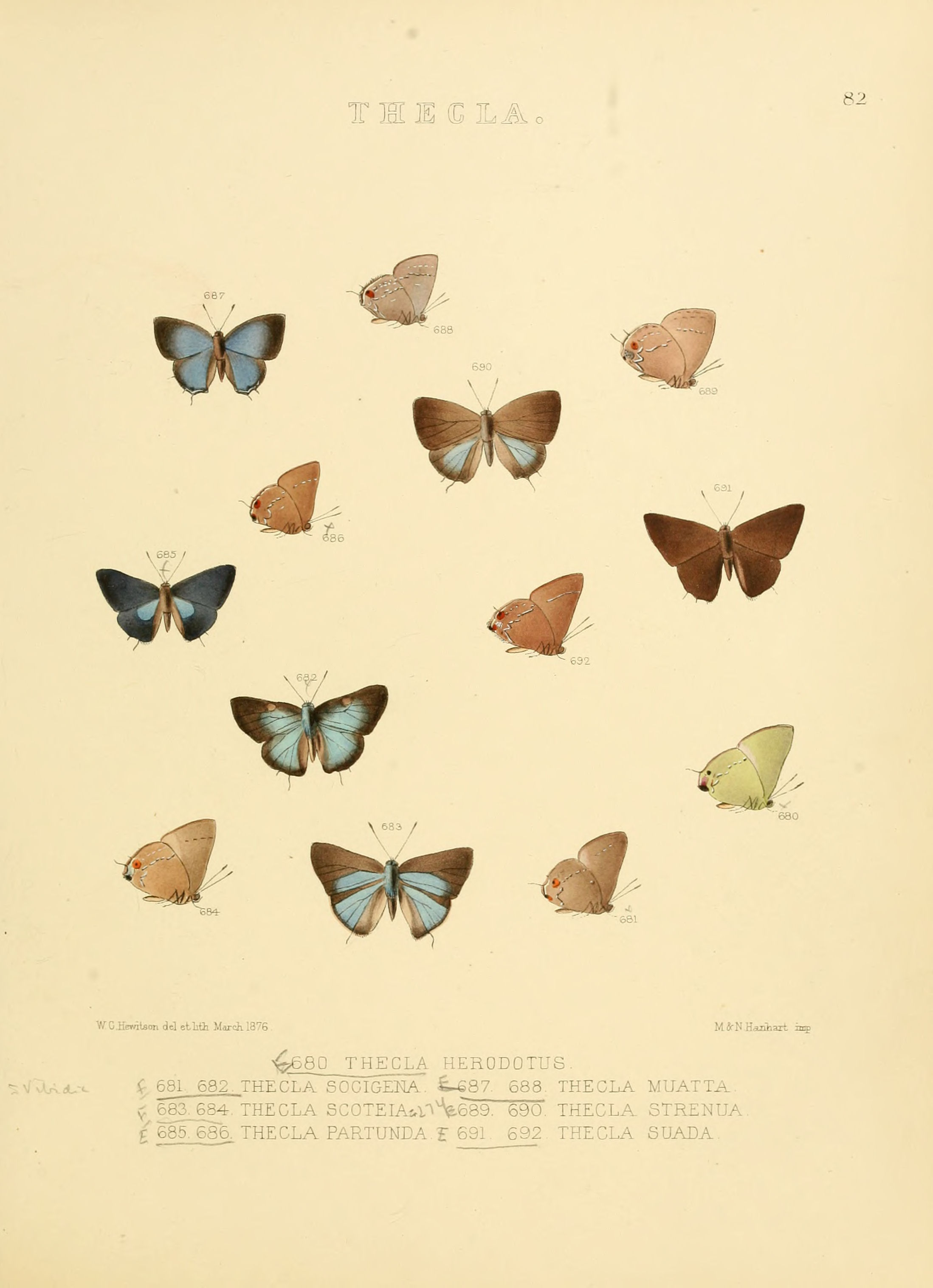
- Symbiopsis strenua, figures 689 and 690

Scientific classification
- Domain: Eukaryota
- Kingdom: Animalia
- Phylum: Arthropoda
- Class: Insecta
- Order: Lepidoptera
- Family: Lycaenidae
- Tribe: Eumaeini
- Genus: Symbiopsis; Nicolay, 1971

= Symbiopsis =

Butterfly genus in family Lycaenidae

Symbiopsis is a Neotropical genus of butterflies in the family Lycaenidae.

== Species ==
- Symbiopsis aprica (Möschler, 1883)
- Symbiopsis lenitas (Druce, 1907)
- Symbiopsis morpho Nicolay, 1971
- Symbiopsis nivepunctata (Druce, 1907)
- Symbiopsis panamensis (Draudt, 1920)
- Symbiopsis pencilatus Johnson & Le Crom, 1997
- Symbiopsis pentas Nicolay, 1971
- Symbiopsis perulera Robbins, 2004
- Symbiopsis pupilla (Draudt, 1920)
- Symbiopsis rickmani (Schaus, 1902)
- Symbiopsis strenua (Hewitson, 1877)
- Symbiopsis tanais (Godman & Salvin, [1887])
