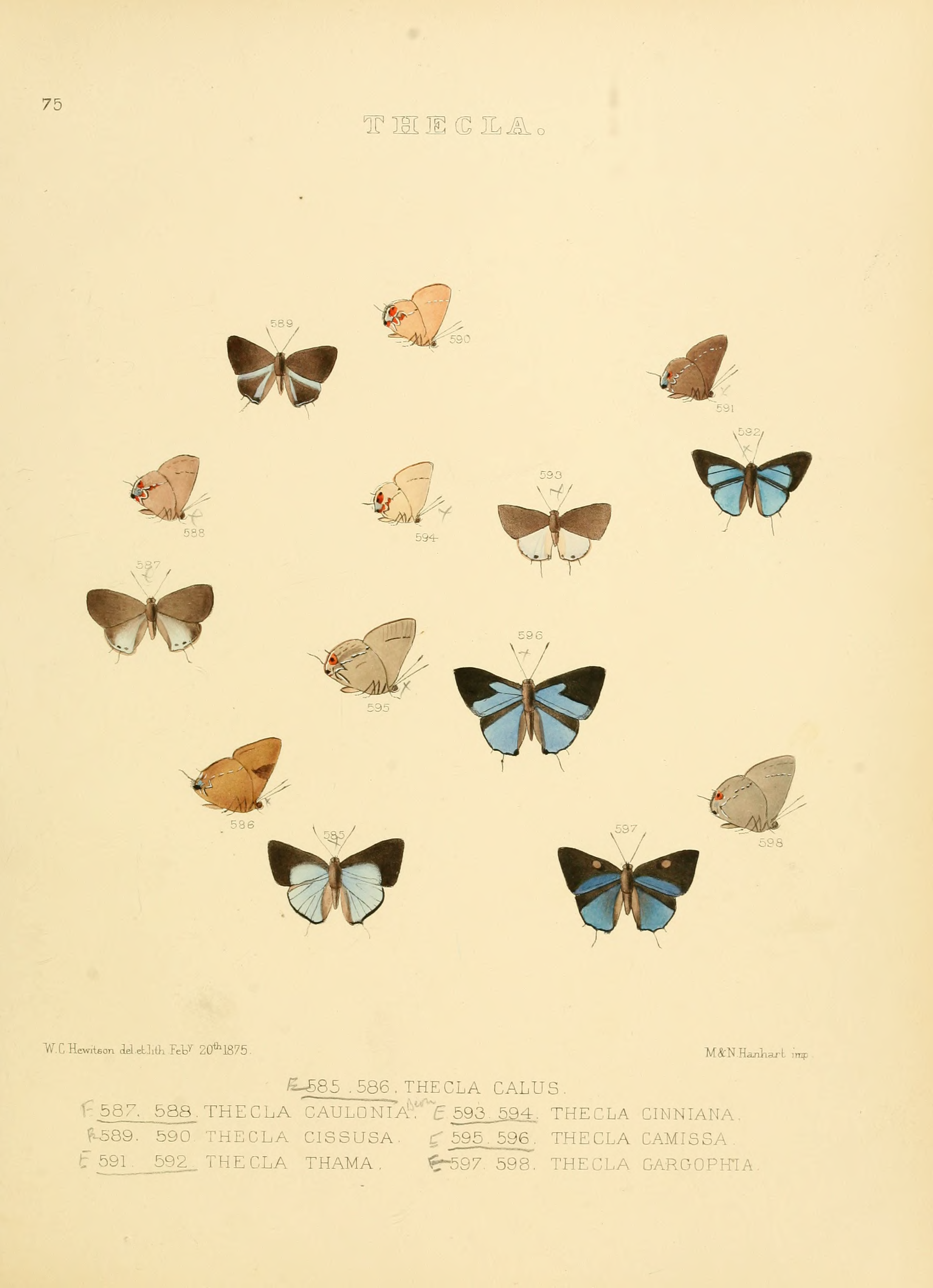
- Gargina gargophia, figures 597 and 598

Scientific classification
- Domain: Eukaryota
- Kingdom: Animalia
- Phylum: Arthropoda
- Class: Insecta
- Order: Lepidoptera
- Family: Lycaenidae
- Tribe: Eumaeini
- Genus: Gargina; Robbins, 2004

= Gargina =

Butterfly genus in family Lycaenidae

Gargina is a genus of butterflies in the family Lycaenidae. The species of this genus are found in the Neotropical realm.

== Species ==
- Gargina gargophia (Hewitson, 1877)
- Gargina thyesta (Hewitson, 1869)
- Gargina caninius (Druce, 1907)
- Gargina gnosia (Hewitson, 1868)
- Gargina emessa (Hewitson, 1867)
- Gargina humber (Schaus, 1902)
- Gargina thoria (Hewitson, 1869)
- Gargina panchaea (Hewitson, 1869)
