= Podanotum =

Scientific classification
- Domain: Eukaryota
- Kingdom: Animalia
- Phylum: Arthropoda
- Class: Insecta
- Order: Lepidoptera
- Family: Lycaenidae
- Tribe: Eumaeini
- Genus: Podanotum; Torres, Hall, Willmott & Johnson, 1996

Butterfly genus in family Lycaenidae

Podanotum is a Neotropical genus of butterfly in the family Lycaenidae.All the species except Podanotum salaeides (Draudt, 1919) are recently described.
