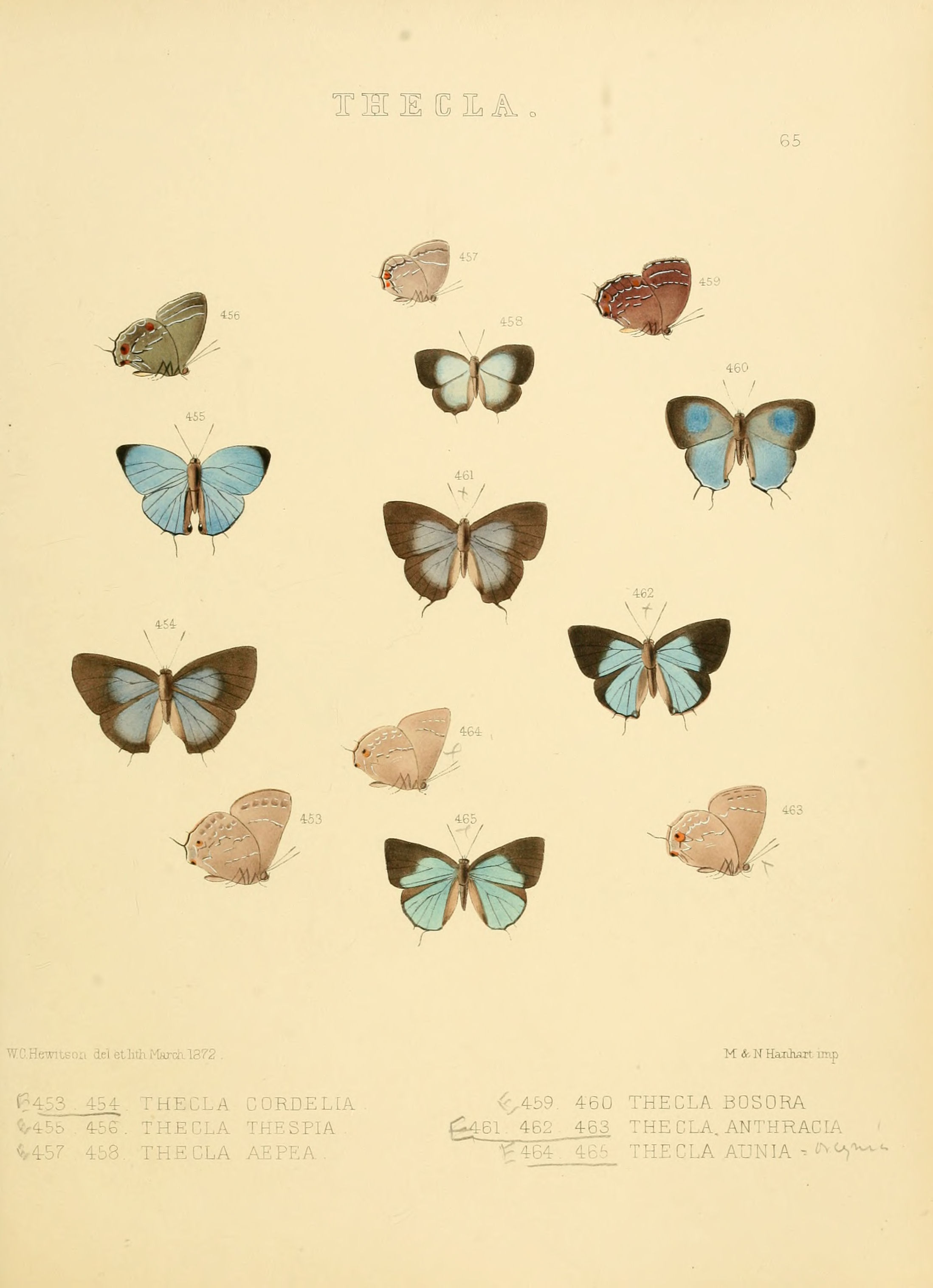
- Male Phothecla thespia, figures 455 and 456

Scientific classification
- Domain: Eukaryota
- Kingdom: Animalia
- Phylum: Arthropoda
- Class: Insecta
- Order: Lepidoptera
- Family: Lycaenidae
- Tribe: Eumaeini
- Genus: Phothecla; Robbins, 2004

= Phothecla =

Butterfly genus in family Lycaenidae

Phothecla is a Neotropical genus of butterflies in the family Lycaenidae.

== Species ==
- Phothecla photismos (Druce, 1907) Ecuador, Bolivia, Venezuela
- Phothecla thespia (Hewitson, 1870) Ecuador, Peru
