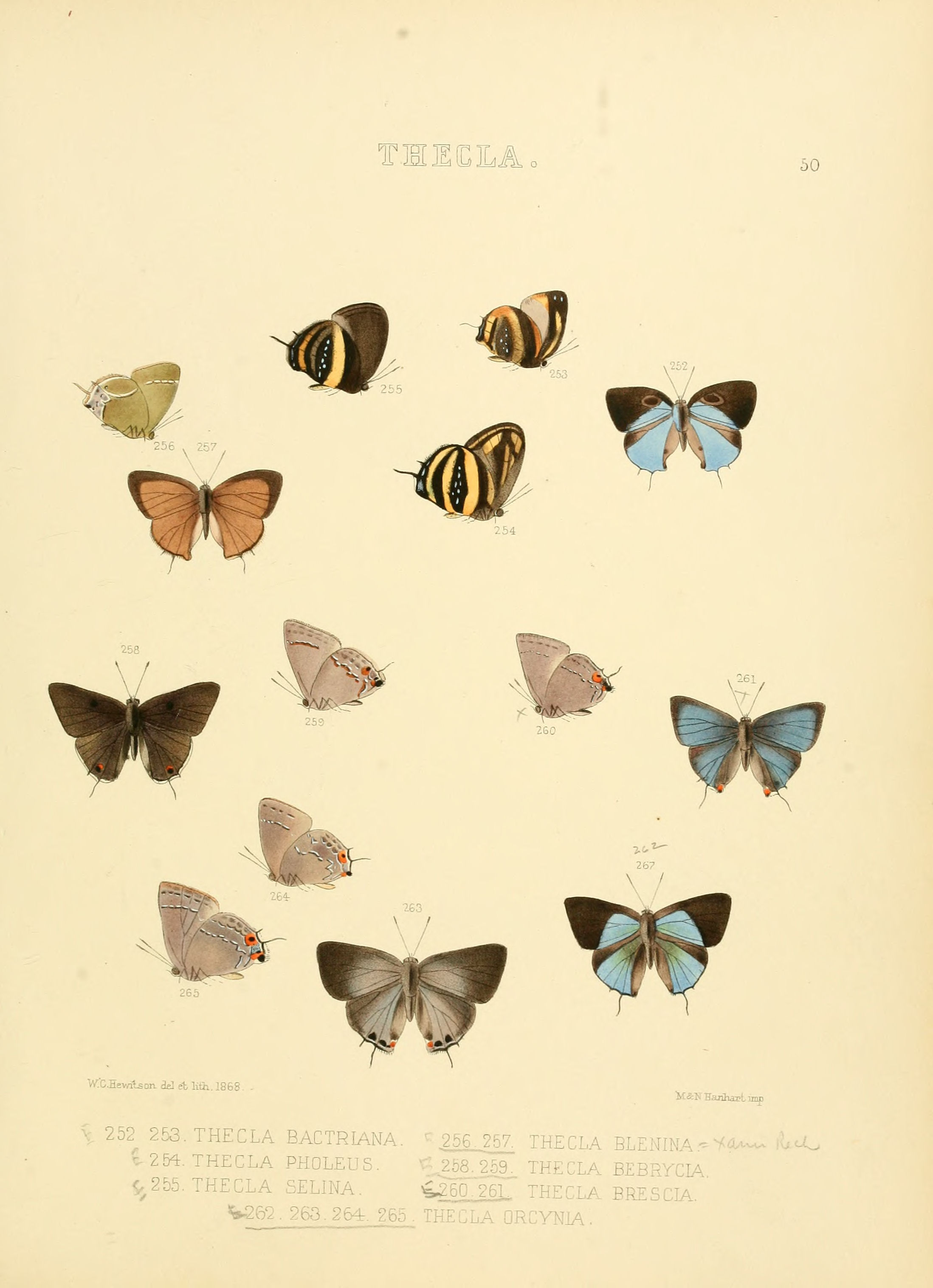
- Bistonina bactriana in William Chapman Hewitson's Illustrations of Diurnal Lepidoptera

Scientific classification
- Domain: Eukaryota
- Kingdom: Animalia
- Phylum: Arthropoda
- Class: Insecta
- Order: Lepidoptera
- Family: Lycaenidae
- Tribe: Eumaeini
- Genus: Bistonina; Robbins, 2004

= Bistonina =

Butterfly genus in family Lycaenidae

Bistonina is a Neotropical genus of butterflies in the family Lycaenidae.

== Species ==
- Bistonina erema (Hewitson, 1867)
- Bistonina biston (Möschler, 1877)
- Bistonina bactriana (Hewitson, 1868)
- Bistonina feretria (Hewitson, 1878)
- Bistonina mantica (Druce, 1907)
- Bistonina olbia (Hewitson, 1867)
