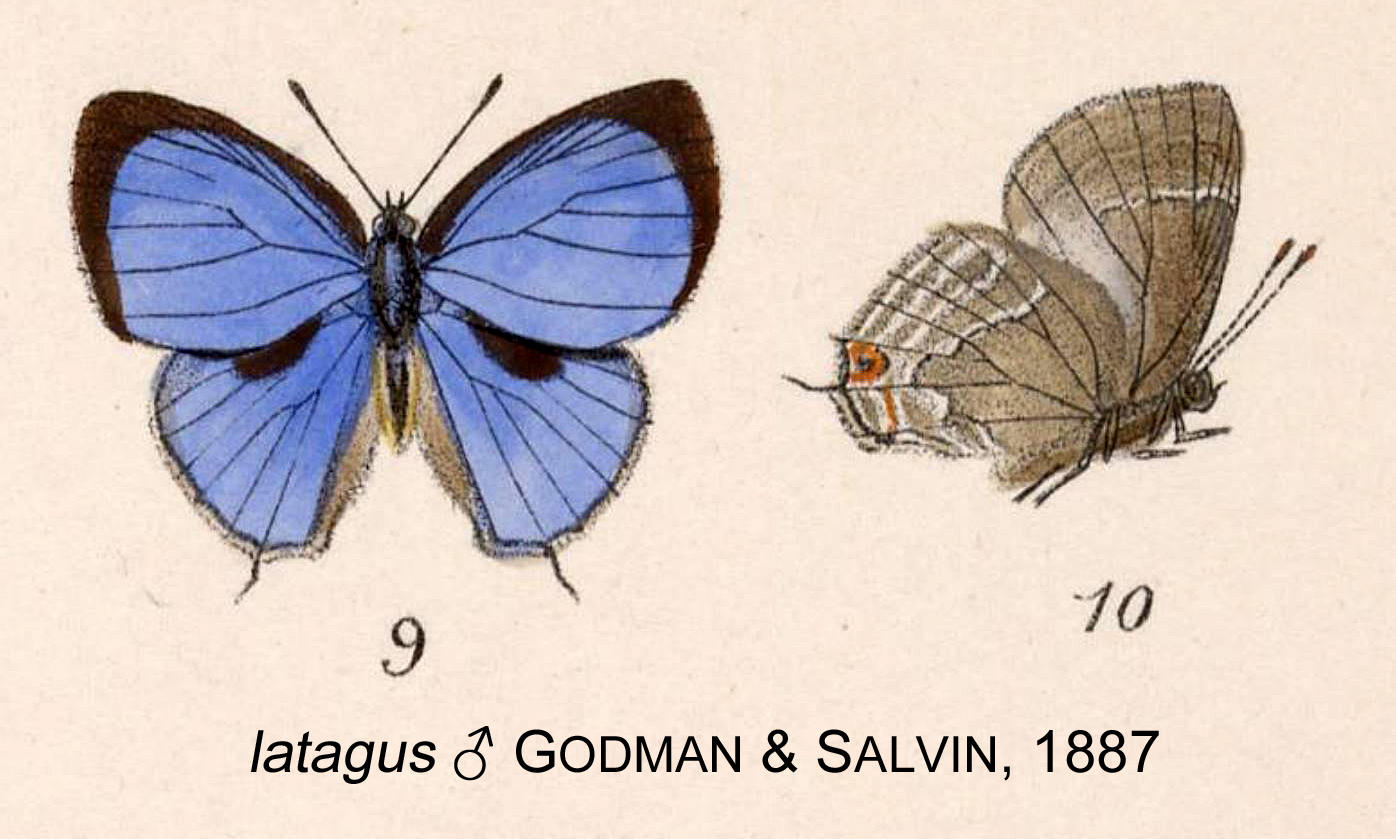
- Lathecla latagus

Scientific classification
- Domain: Eukaryota
- Kingdom: Animalia
- Phylum: Arthropoda
- Class: Insecta
- Order: Lepidoptera
- Family: Lycaenidae
- Tribe: Eumaeini
- Genus: Lathecla; Robbins, 2004

= Lathecla =

Butterfly genus in family Lycaenidae

Lathecla is a Neotropical genus of butterfly in the family Lycaenidae.
