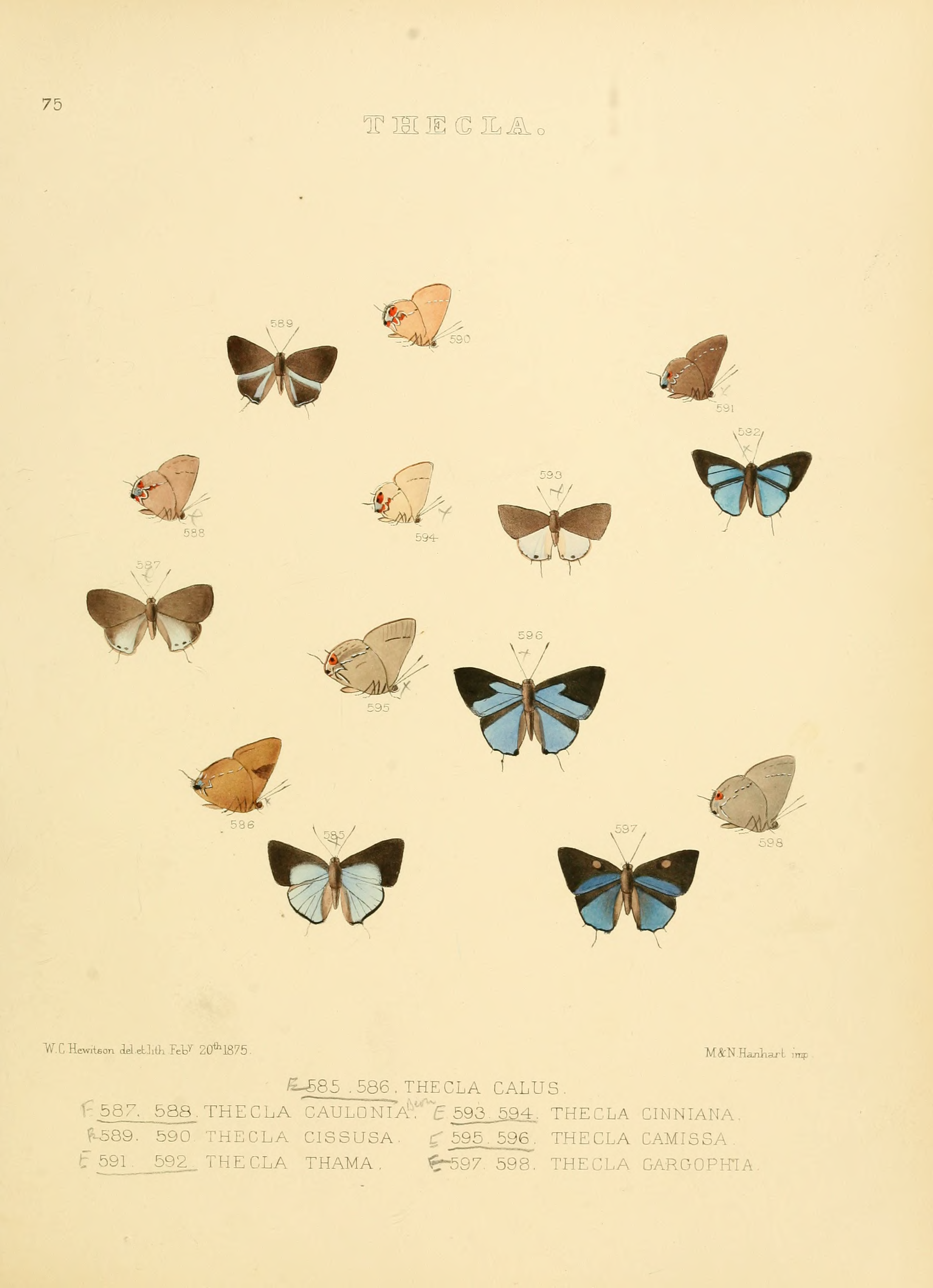
- Figures 595 and 596

Scientific classification
- Domain: Eukaryota
- Kingdom: Animalia
- Phylum: Arthropoda
- Class: Insecta
- Order: Lepidoptera
- Family: Lycaenidae
- Tribe: Eumaeini
- Genus: Camissecla; Robbins & Duarte, 2004

= Camissecla =

Genus of butterflies

Camissecla is a genus of butterflies in the family Lycaenidae. The genus was erected by Robert K. Robbins and Marcelo Duarte in 2004. The species of this genus are found in the Neotropical realm.

== Species ==
- Camissecla charichlorus (Butler & H. Druce, 1872) Costa Rica, Nicaragua, Colombia
- Camissecla simasca (Draudt, 1920) Colombia
- Camissecla gedrosia (Hewitson, 1868) Brazil
- Camissecla camissa (Hewitson, 1870) Guatemala, Ecuador
- Camissecla cleocha (Hewitson, 1870) Ecuador
- Camissecla pactya (Hewitson, 1874) Colombia, Bolivia, Ecuador
- Camissecla vespasianus (Butler & H. Druce, 1872) Costa Rica, Guatemala
- Camissecla melma (Schaus, 1913) Costa Rica, Panama
- Camissecla saphronotis (Johnson & Kroenlein, 1993) Ecuador
- Camissecla ledaea (Hewitson, 1868) Brazil
- Camissecla vesper (H. H. Druce, 1909) Colombia, Peru, French Guiana
- Camissecla verbenaca (H. H. Druce, 1907) Brazil
