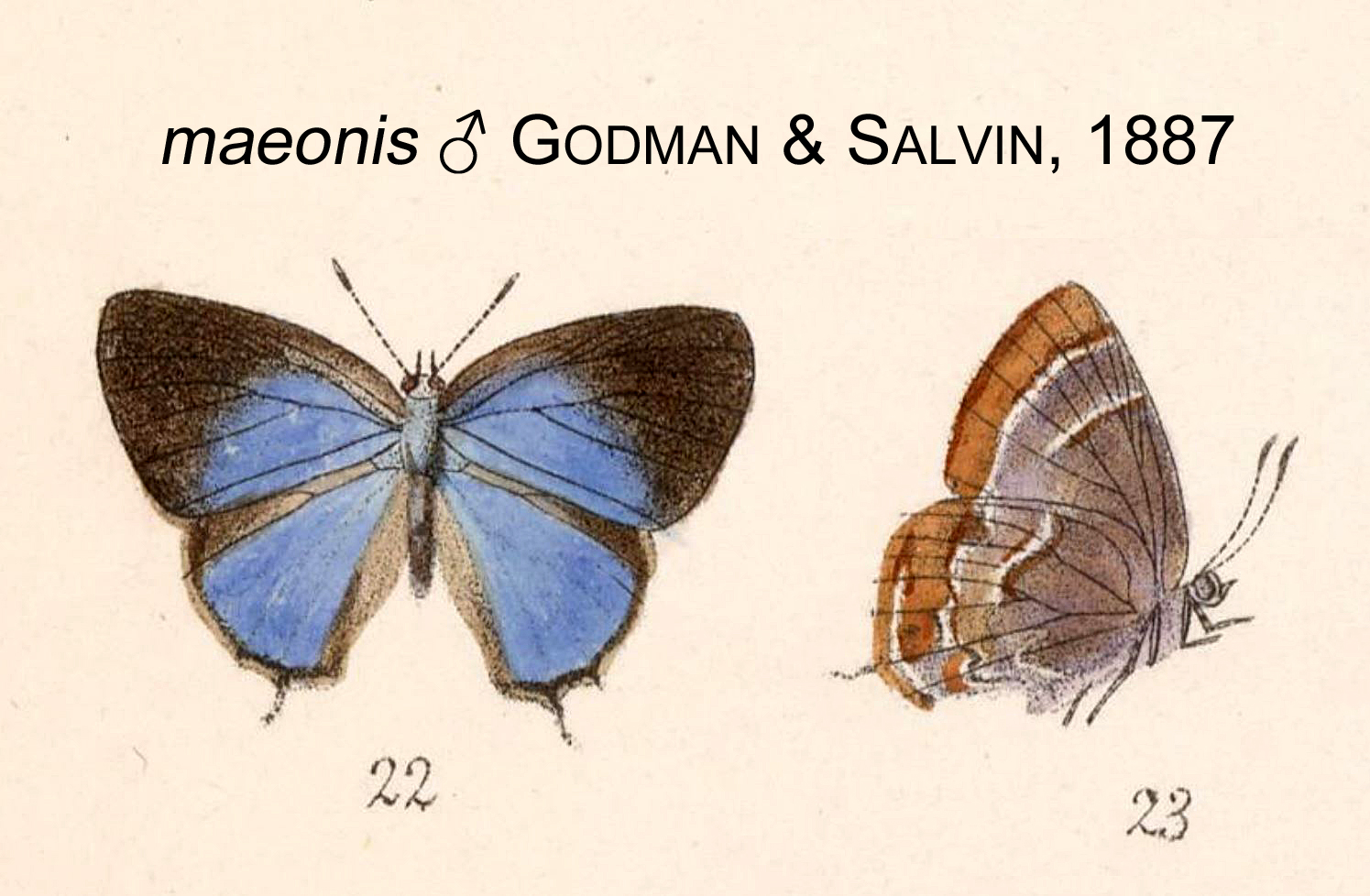
- Apuecla maeonis

Scientific classification
- Domain: Eukaryota
- Kingdom: Animalia
- Phylum: Arthropoda
- Class: Insecta
- Order: Lepidoptera
- Family: Lycaenidae
- Genus: Apuecla; Robbins, 2004

= Apuecla =

Butterfly genus in family Lycaenidae

Apuecla is a genus of butterflies in the family Lycaenidae. The species of this genus are found in the Neotropical realm.

== Species ==
- Apuecla maeonis (Godman & Salvin, [1887])
- Apuecla picus (Druce, 1907)
- Apuecla upupa (Druce, 1907)
