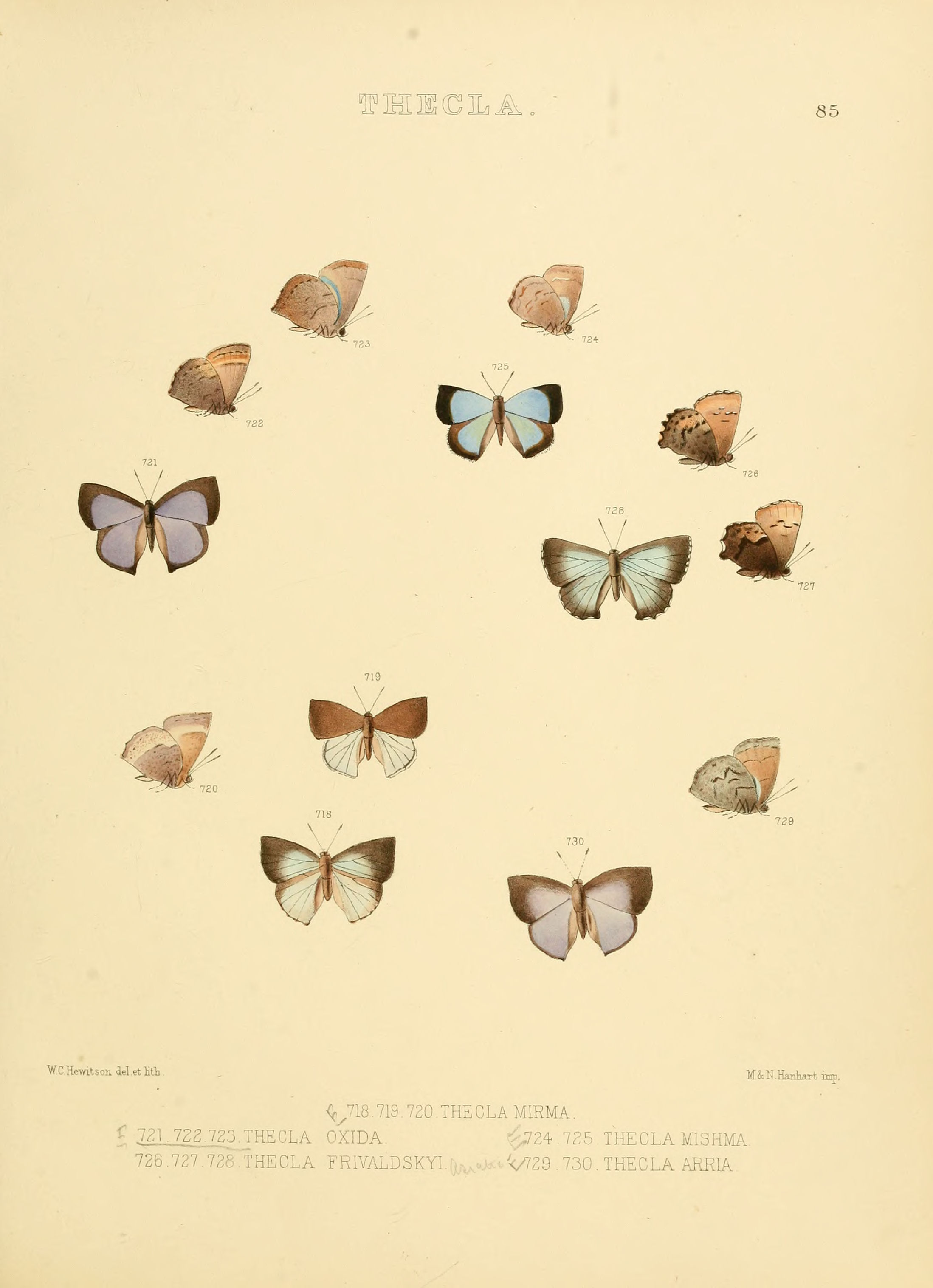
- Rhamma depicted in William Chapman Hewitson's Illustrations of diurnal Lepidoptera

Scientific classification
- Domain: Eukaryota
- Kingdom: Animalia
- Phylum: Arthropoda
- Class: Insecta
- Order: Lepidoptera
- Family: Lycaenidae
- Genus: Rhamma; Johnson, 1992

Synonyms
- Paralustrus K.Johnson, 1992; Pontirama K.Johnson, 1992; Shapiroana K.Johnson, 1992

= Rhamma =

Butterfly genus in family Lycaenidae

Rhamma is a Neotropical genus of butterfly in the family Lycaenidae.

== Species ==
partial

- Rhamma adunca (Draudt, 1921)
- Rhamma amethystina (Hayward, 1950)
- Rhamma arria (Hewitson, 1870)
- Rhamma aurugo (Draudt, 1921)
- Rhamma bilix (Draudt, 1921)
- Rhamma commodus (Felder & Felder, 1865)
- Rhamma confusa (Lathy, 1936)
- Rhamma hybla (Druce, 1907)
- Rhamma mishma (Hewitson, 1878)
- Rhamma oxida (Hewitson, 1870)
- Rhamma tyrrius (Druce, 1907)
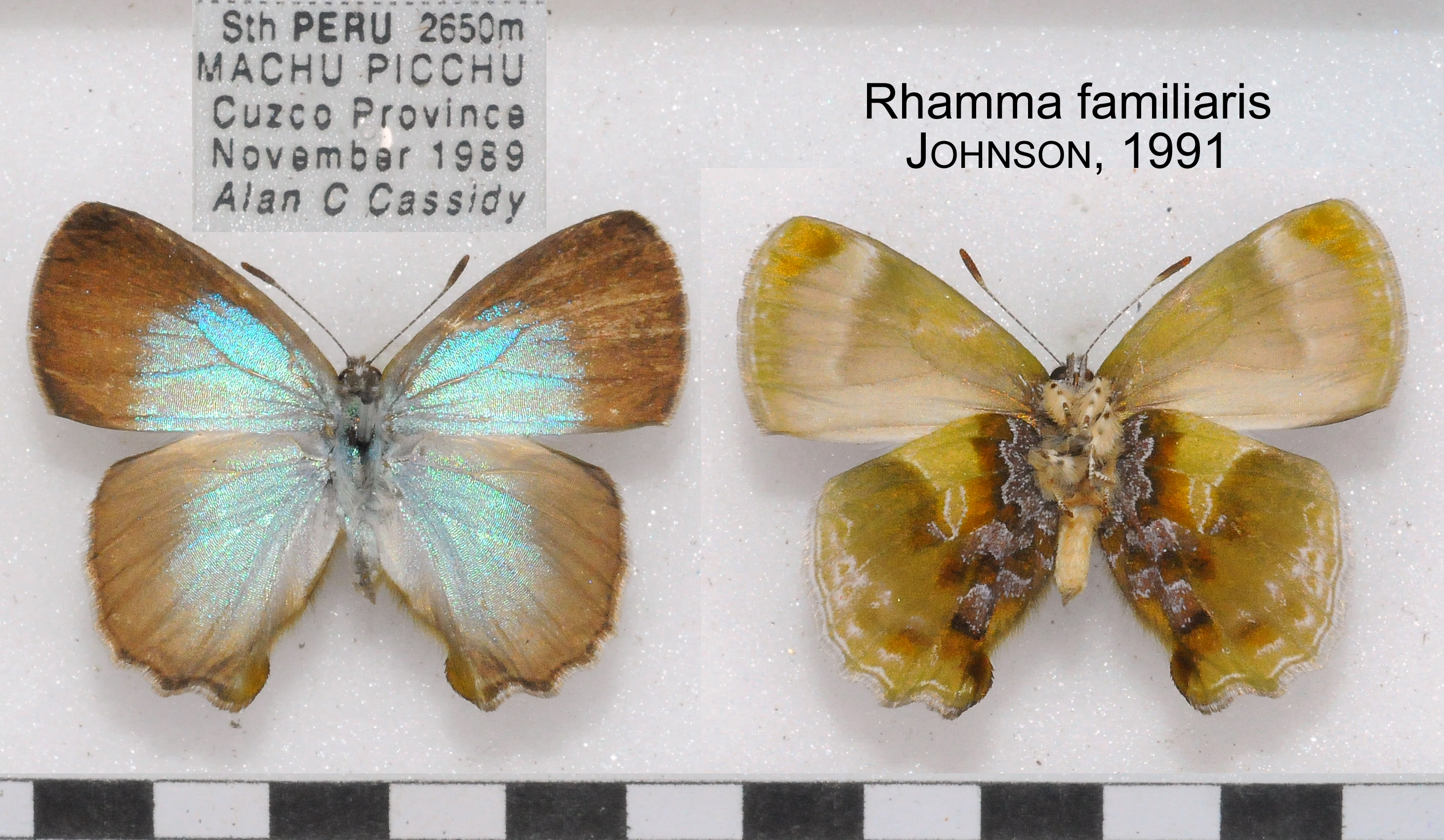
Rhamma familiaris

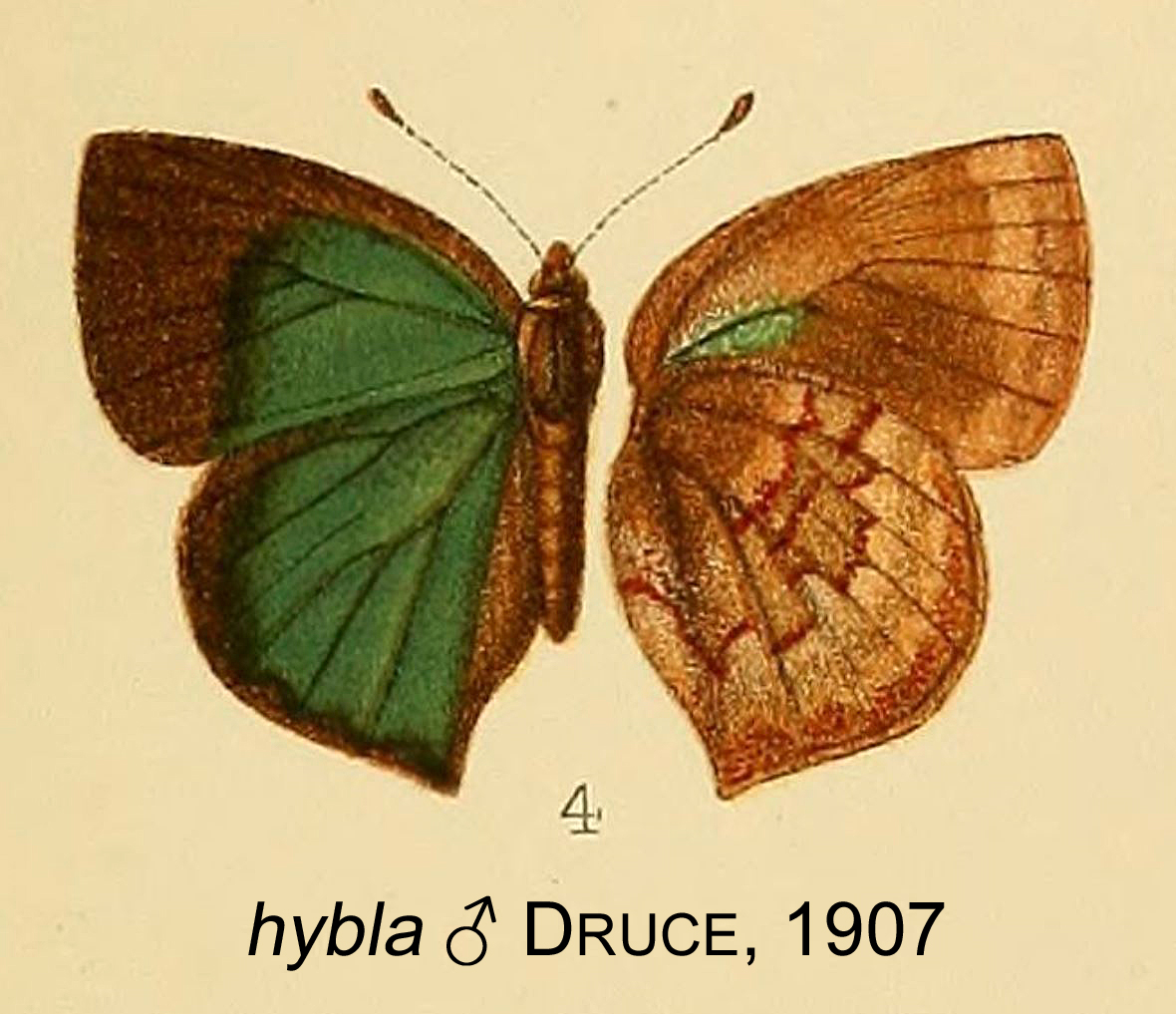
Rhamma hybla
