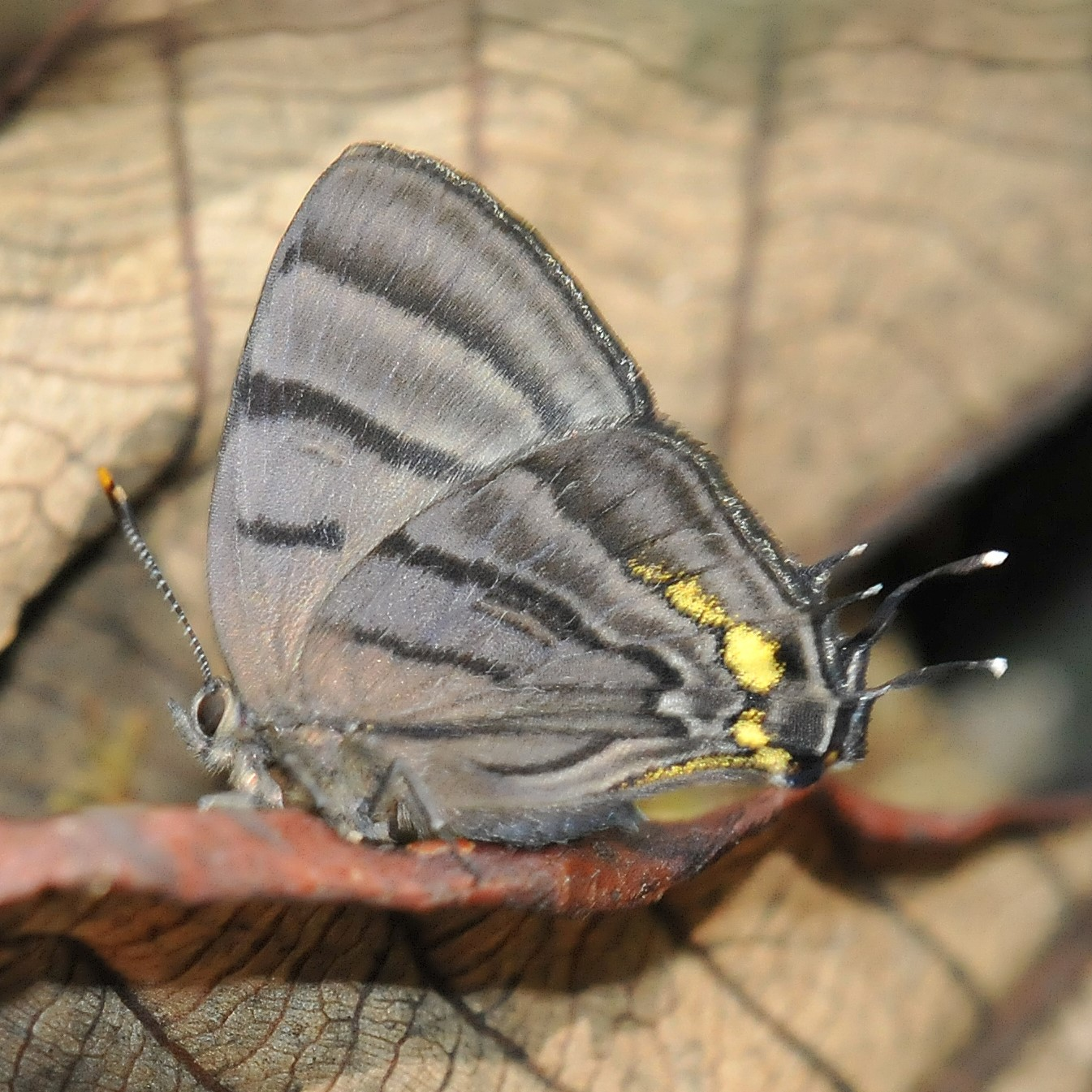
- Thaeides ramoni

Scientific classification
- Kingdom: Animalia
- Phylum: Arthropoda
- Clade: Pancrustacea
- Class: Insecta
- Order: Lepidoptera
- Family: Lycaenidae
- Tribe: Eumaeini
- Genus: Thaeides; Johnson, Kruse & Kroenlein, 1997

= Thaeides =

Butterfly genus in family Lycaenidae

Thaeides is a Neotropical genus of butterflies in the family Lycaenidae.

== Species ==
- Thaeides goleta (Hewitson, 1877) - Colombia
- Thaeides muela (Dyar, 1913) - Peru
- Thaeides pyrczi (Johnson, Le Crom & Constantino, 1997) - Venezuela
- Thaeides ramoni Prieto, 2024 - Colombia
- Thaeides theia (Hewitson, 1870) - Ecuador, Brazil (Rio de Janeiro)
- Thaeides xavieri (Le Crom & Johnson, 1997) - Colombia
