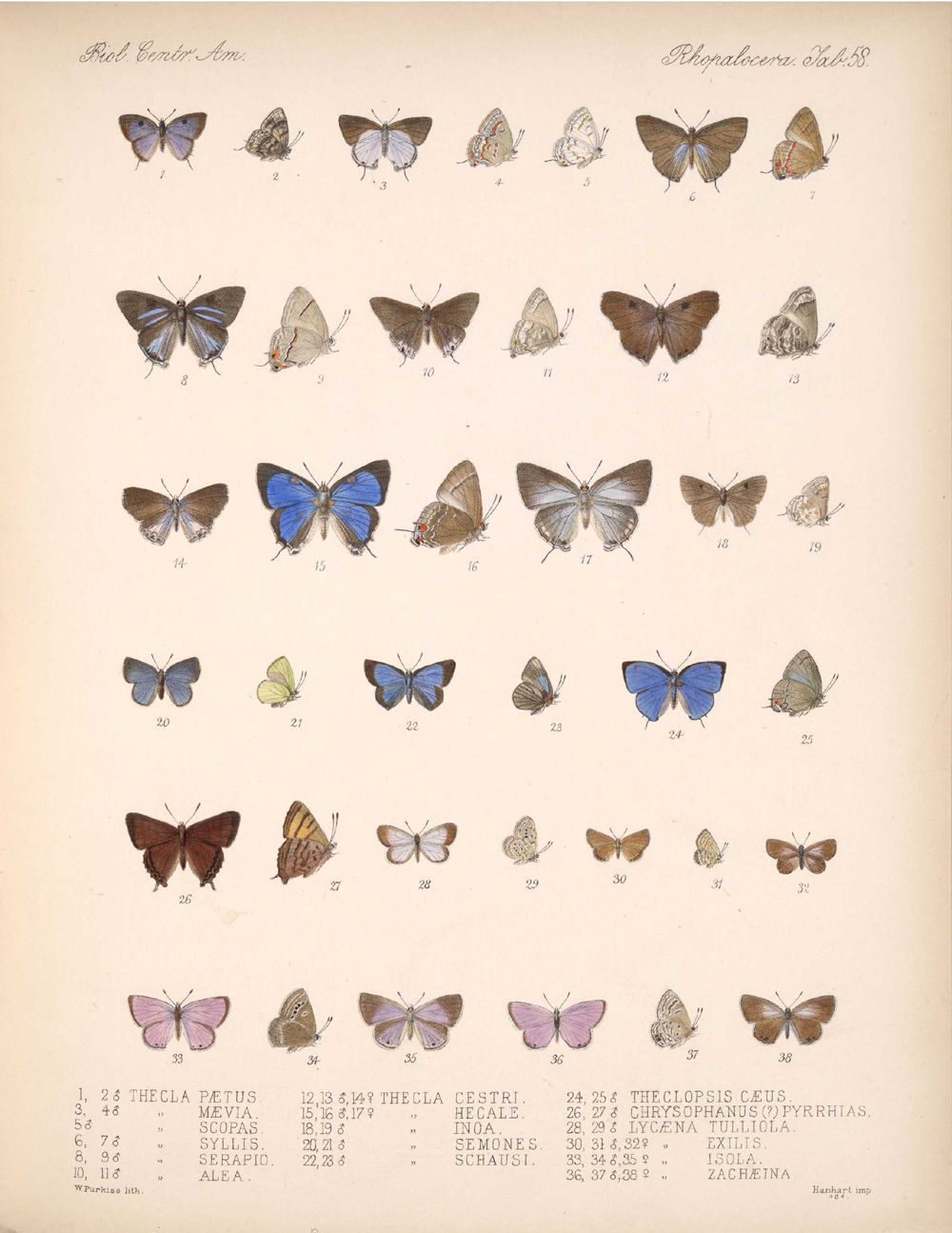
- Figs. 15, 16, 17 Michaelus hecate (Godman & Salvin, [1887])

Scientific classification
- Domain: Eukaryota
- Kingdom: Animalia
- Phylum: Arthropoda
- Class: Insecta
- Order: Lepidoptera
- Family: Lycaenidae
- Tribe: Eumaeini
- Genus: Michaelus; Nicolay, 1979

= Michaelus =

Butterfly genus in family Lycaenidae

Michaelus is a genus of butterflies in the family Lycaenidae. The members (species) of this genus are found in the Neotropical realm.
