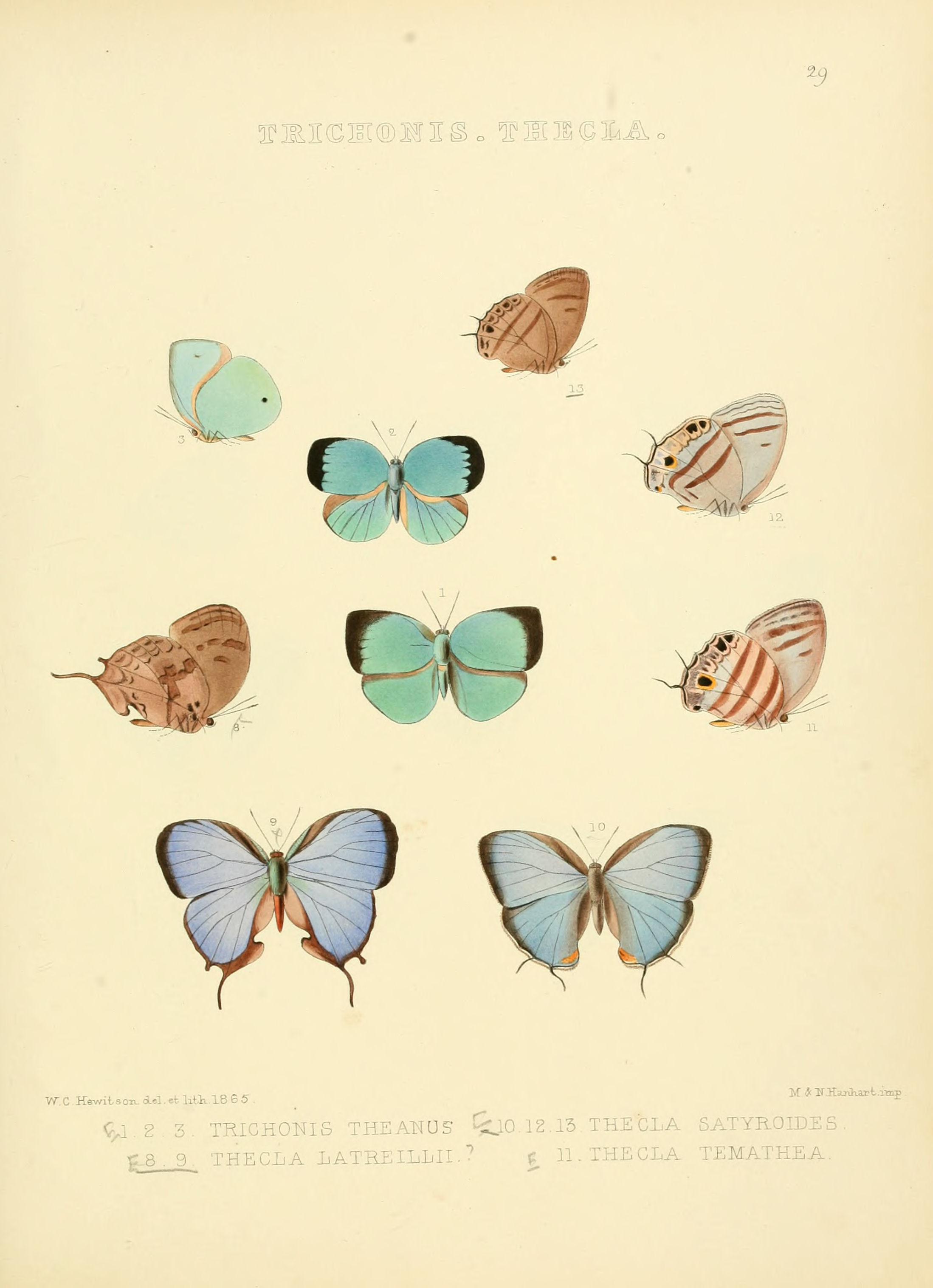
- Trichonis hyacinthus, figures 1 and 3 (male), figure 2 (female)

Scientific classification
- Domain: Eukaryota
- Kingdom: Animalia
- Phylum: Arthropoda
- Class: Insecta
- Order: Lepidoptera
- Family: Lycaenidae
- Tribe: Eumaeini
- Genus: Trichonis; Hewitson, 1865

= Trichonis =

Butterfly genus in family Lycaenidae

Trichonis is a Neotropical genus of butterflies in the family Lycaenidae.

One species, Trichonis immaculata, is a small blue butterfly found in the West Indies. The outer edges of the forewings are dark blue with the remainder of the wings being a light blue. They are about 30 mm wide and 25 mm long.

Other species share the "dark around the edges" effect.

== Species ==
- Trichonis hyacinthus (Cramer, [1775])
- Trichonis immaculata Lathy, 1930
