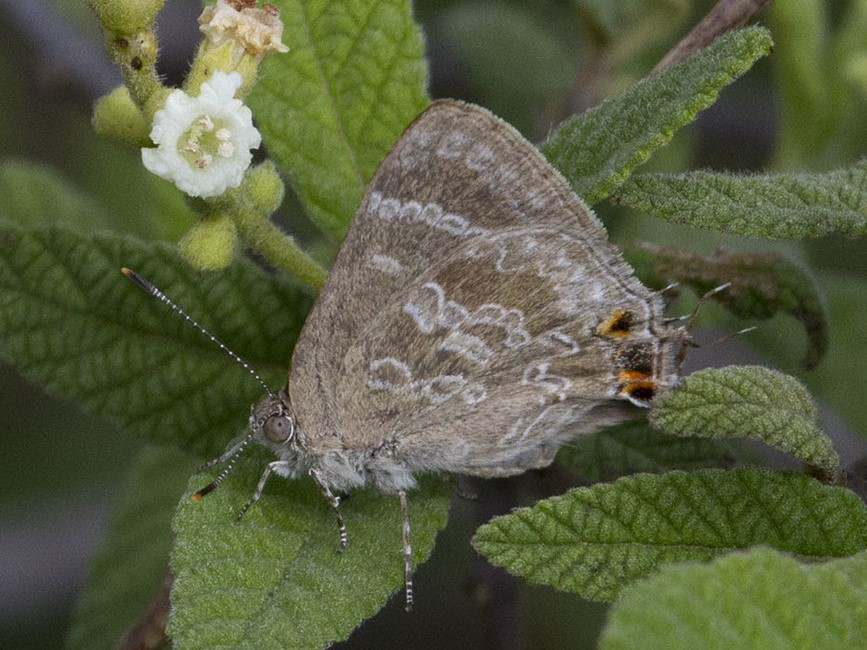
- Contrafacia bassania

Scientific classification
- Kingdom: Animalia
- Phylum: Arthropoda
- Clade: Pancrustacea
- Class: Insecta
- Order: Lepidoptera
- Family: Lycaenidae
- Genus: Contrafacia; Johnson, 1989

= Contrafacia =

Butterfly genus in family Lycaenidae

Contrafacia is a genus of Neotropical butterflies in the family Lycaenidae.

== Species ==
- Contrafacia bassania (Hewitson, 1868) Mexico
- Contrafacia marmoris (Druce, 1907) Colombia, Venezuela
- Contrafacia ahola (Hewitson, 1867) Mexico, Venezuela, Colombia, Ecuador
- Contrafacia imma (Prittwitz, 1865) Mexico, Guatemala, Surinam, French Guiana, Venezuela, Colombia, Ecuador, Brazil, Paraguay, Argentina
- Contrafacia francis (Weeks, 1901) Bolivia, Argentina
- Contrafacia muattina (Schaus, 1902) Brazil
