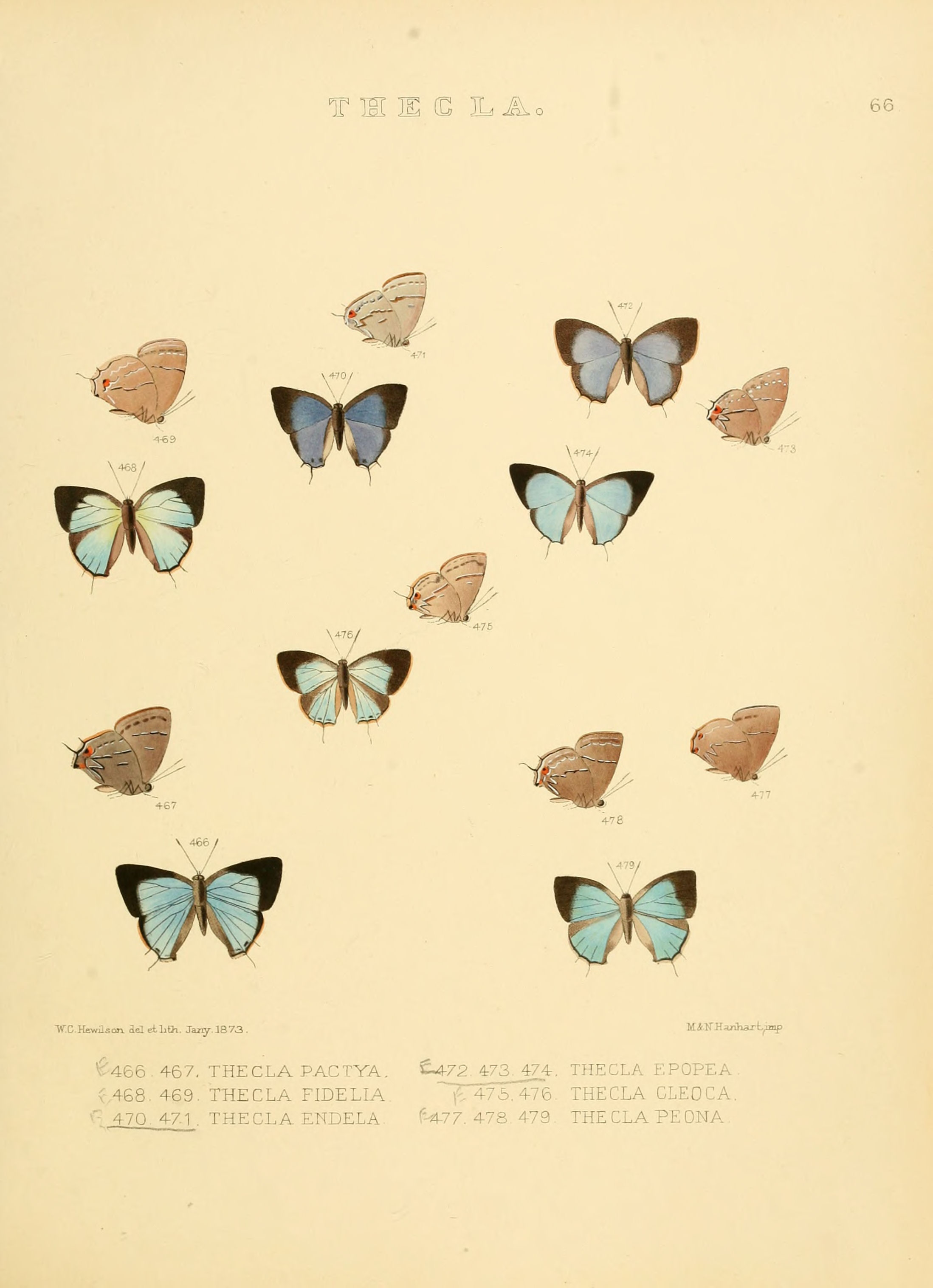
- Marachina fidelia, figures 468 and 469

Scientific classification
- Domain: Eukaryota
- Kingdom: Animalia
- Phylum: Arthropoda
- Class: Insecta
- Order: Lepidoptera
- Family: Lycaenidae
- Tribe: Eumaeini
- Genus: Marachina; Robbins, 2004

= Marachina =

Butterfly genus in family Lycaenidae

Marachina is a Neotropical genus of butterflies in the family Lycaenidae.

== Species ==
- Marachina maraches (Druce, 1912)
- Marachina fidelia (Hewitson, 1874)
- Marachina peonida (Draudt, 1919)
