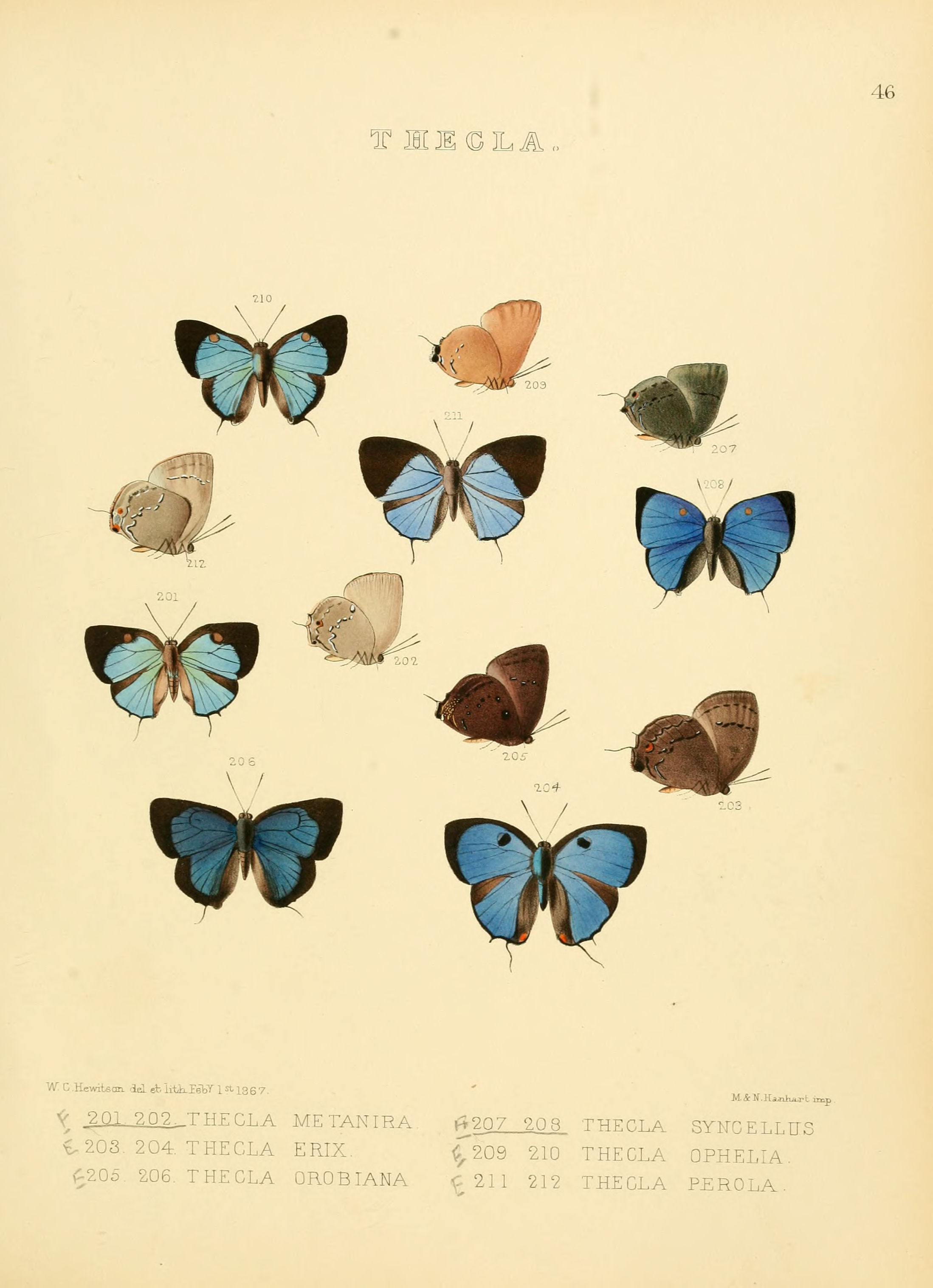
- Figs. 209, 210 Olynthus ophelia (Hewitson, 1867).

Scientific classification
- Domain: Eukaryota
- Kingdom: Animalia
- Phylum: Arthropoda
- Class: Insecta
- Order: Lepidoptera
- Family: Lycaenidae
- Genus: Olynthus; Hübner, [1819]

= Olynthus (butterfly) =

Butterfly genus in family Lycaenidae

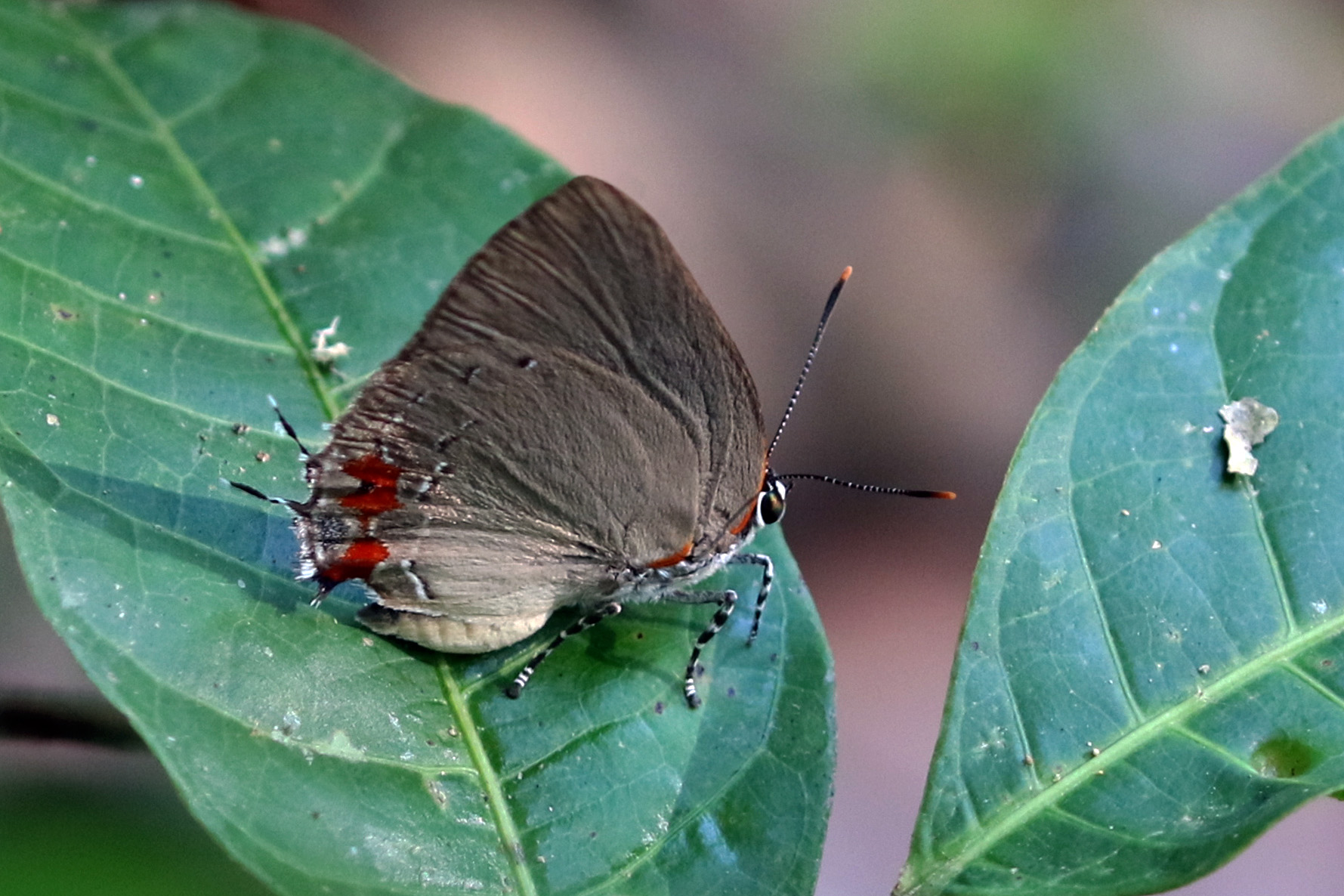
Olynthus sp., Cristalino River Southern Amazon, Brazil

Olynthus is a Neotropical genus of butterfly in the family Lycaenidae.
