= Mesocyanophrys =

Scientific classification (disputed)
- Domain: Eukaryota
- Kingdom: Animalia
- Phylum: Arthropoda
- Class: Insecta
- Order: Lepidoptera
- Family: Lycaenidae
- Genus: Mesocyanophrys; Johnson & Le Crom, 1997

Type species
- Thecla lycimna Hewitson, 1868

Butterfly genus in family Lycaenidae

Mesocyanophrys is a genus of butterflies in the family Lycaenidae. It has an uncertain status; some sources list it as a synonym of Cyanophrys following Pelham (2008).
