= Mithras (butterfly) =

Scientific classification
- Kingdom: Animalia
- Phylum: Arthropoda
- Clade: Pancrustacea
- Class: Insecta
- Order: Lepidoptera
- Family: Lycaenidae
- Tribe: Eumaeini
- Genus: Mithras; Hübner, [1819]

Butterfly genus in family Lycaenidae

Mithras is a Neotropical genus of butterfly in the family Lycaenidae.
