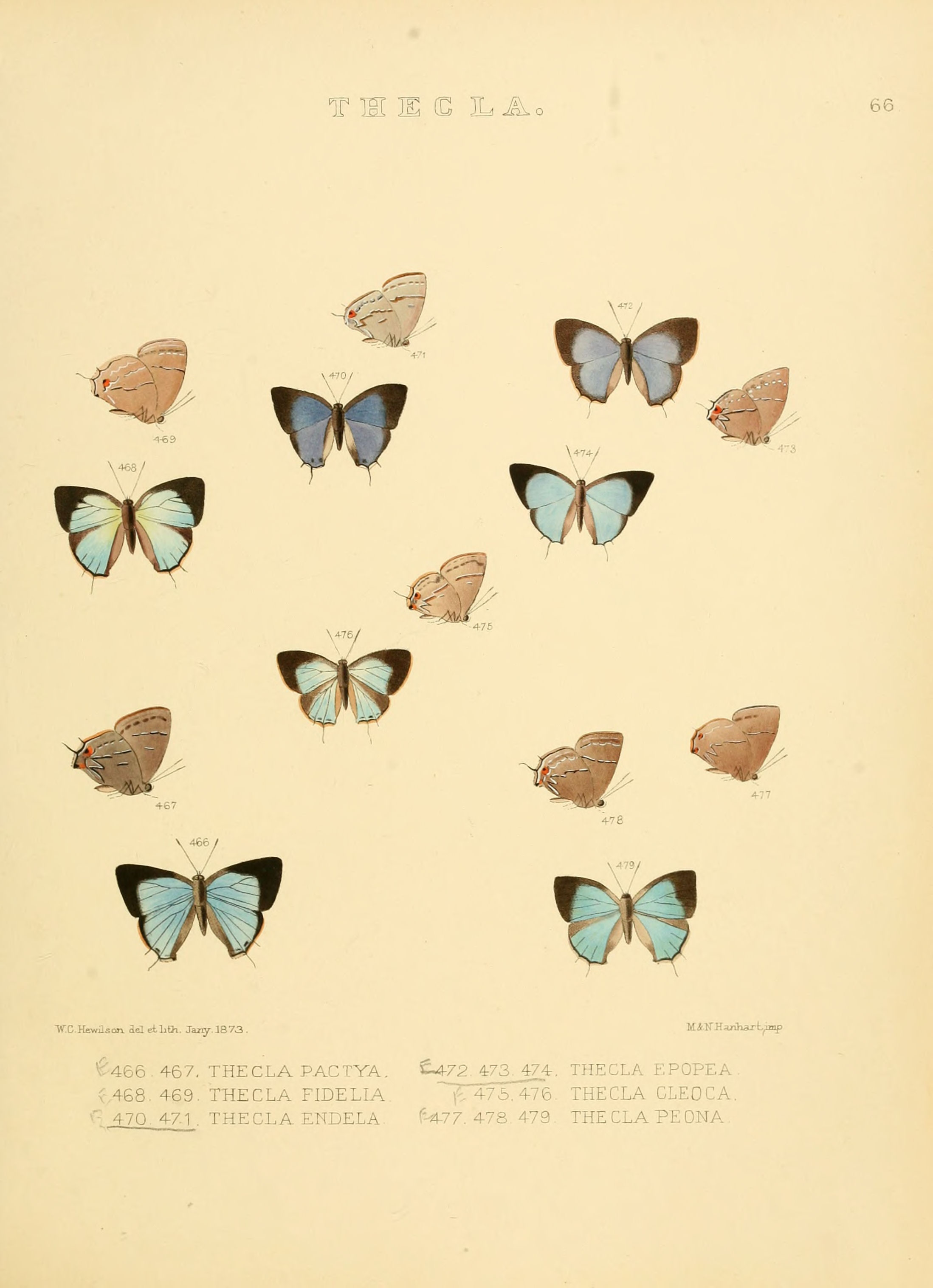
- Temecla peona depicted in William Chapman Hewitson's Illustrations of diurnal Lepidoptera

Scientific classification
- Domain: Eukaryota
- Kingdom: Animalia
- Phylum: Arthropoda
- Class: Insecta
- Order: Lepidoptera
- Family: Lycaenidae
- Tribe: Eumaeini
- Genus: Temecla; Robbins, 2004

= Temecla =

Butterfly genus in family Lycaenidae

Temecla is a genus of Neotropical hairstreak butterfly in the family Lycaenidae.

== Species ==
- Temecla tema (Hewitson, 1867) Brazil (Amazon), Colombia.
- Temecla paron (Godman & Salvin, [1887]) Guatemala.
- Temecla heraclides (Godman & Salvin, [1887])
- Temecla sergius (Godman & Salvin, [1887]) Venezuela, Colombia.
- Temecla bennetti (Dyar, 1913) Peru
- Temecla peona (Hewitson, 1874)
