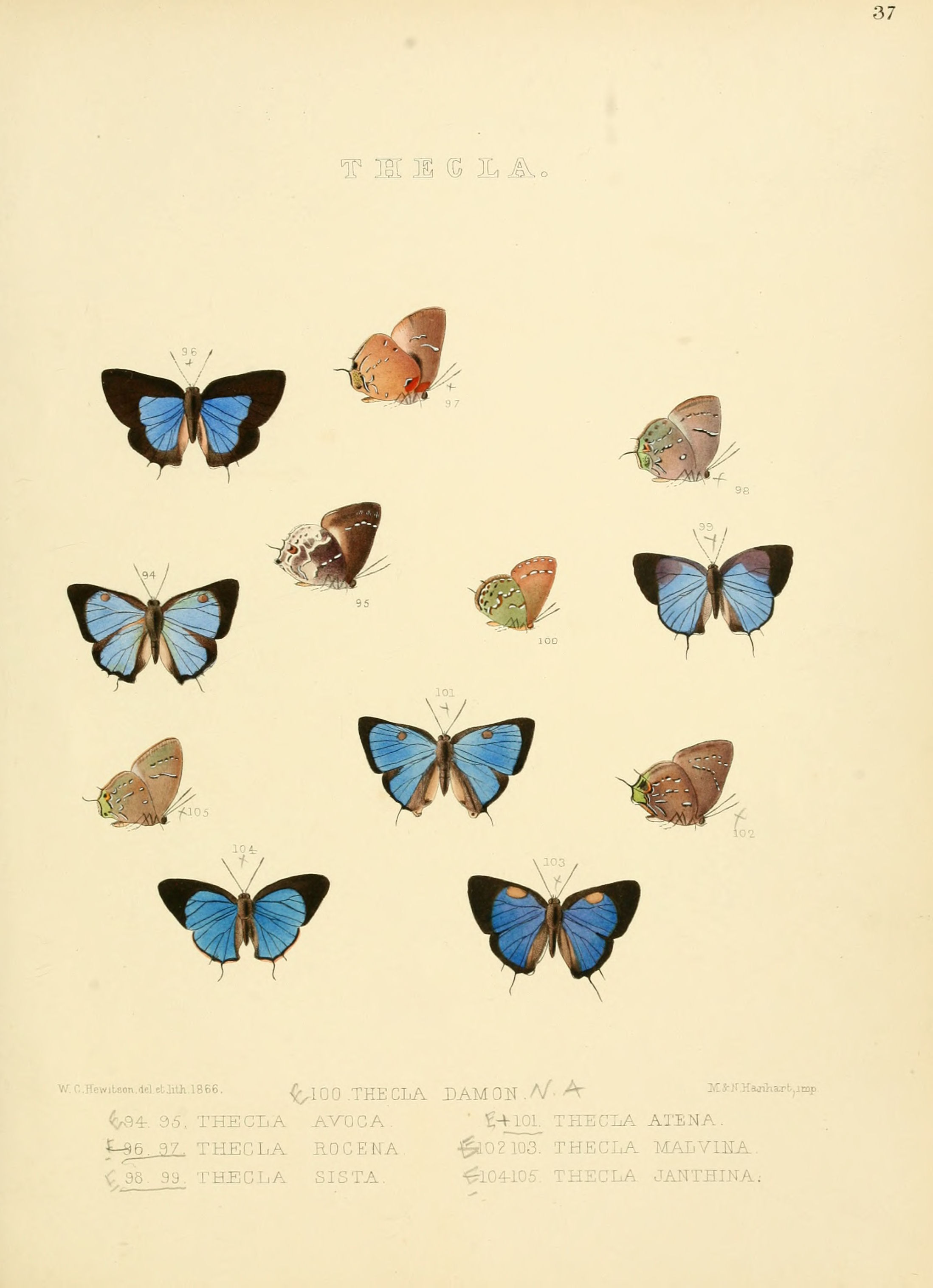
- Janthecla and other Lycaenidae in William Chapman Hewitson's Illustrations of Diurnal Lepidoptera

Scientific classification
- Domain: Eukaryota
- Kingdom: Animalia
- Phylum: Arthropoda
- Class: Insecta
- Order: Lepidoptera
- Family: Lycaenidae
- Tribe: Eumaeini
- Genus: Janthecla; Robbins & Venables, 1991

= Janthecla =

Butterfly genus in family Lycaenidae

Janthecla is a Neotropical genus of butterflies in the family Lycaenidae.

== Species ==
- Janthecla rocena (Hewitson, 1867)
- Janthecla malvina (Hewitson, 1867)
- Janthecla janthodonia (Dyar, 1918)
- Janthecla cydonia (Druce, 1890)
- Janthecla leea Venables & Robbins, 1991
- Janthecla armilla (Druce, 1907)
- Janthecla janthina (Hewitson, 1867)
- Janthecla sista (Hewitson, 1867)
- Janthecla aurora (Druce, 1907)
- Janthecla flosculus (Druce, 1907)
