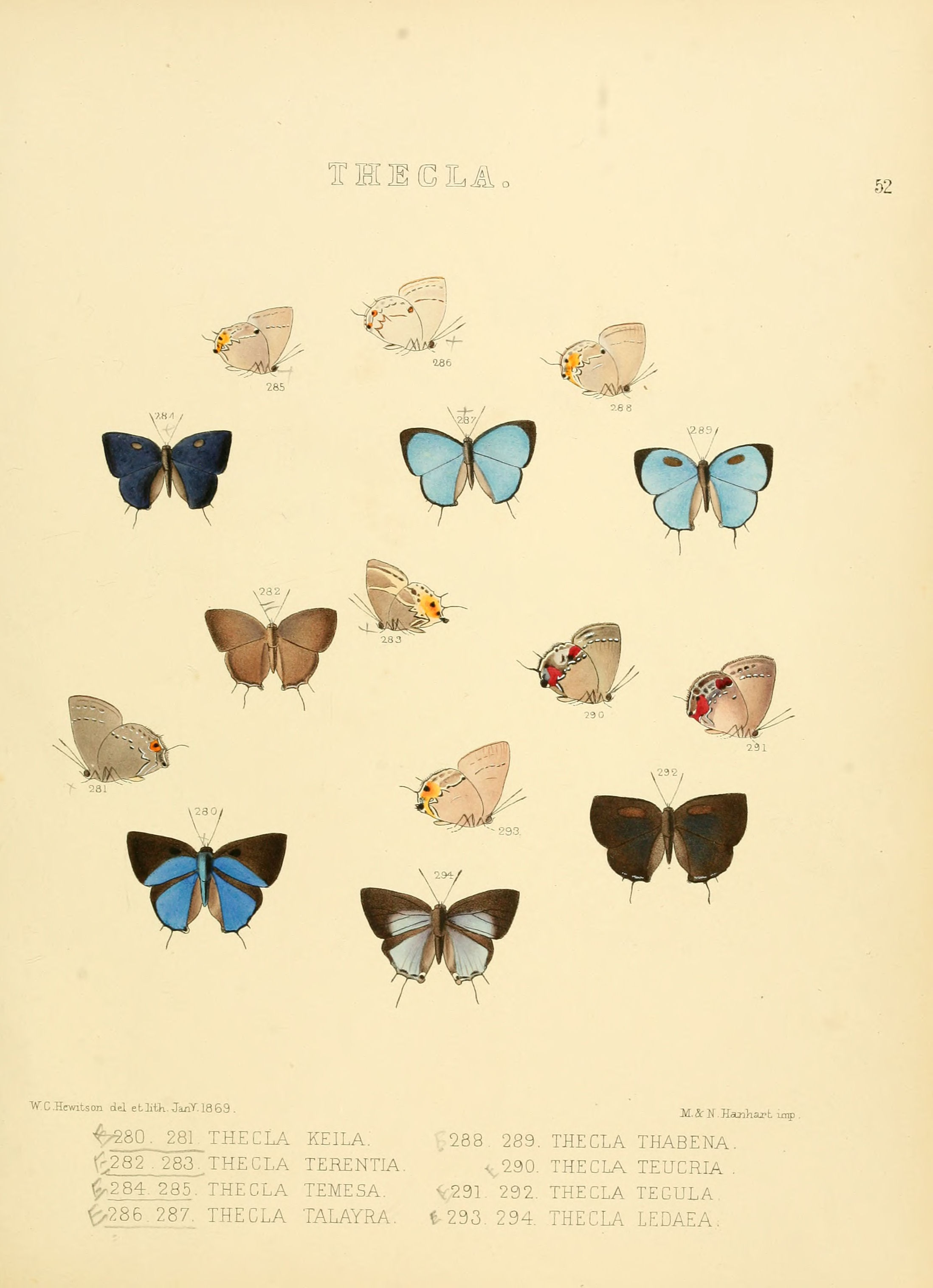
- Magnastigma hirsuta (Prittwitz, 1865) depicted in William Chapman Hewitson's Illustrations of diurnal Lepidoptera

Scientific classification
- Domain: Eukaryota
- Kingdom: Animalia
- Phylum: Arthropoda
- Class: Insecta
- Order: Lepidoptera
- Family: Lycaenidae
- Genus: Magnastigma; Nicolay, 1977

= Magnastigma =

Butterfly genus in family Lycaenidae

Magnastigma is a Neotropical genus of butterfly in the family Lycaenidae.
