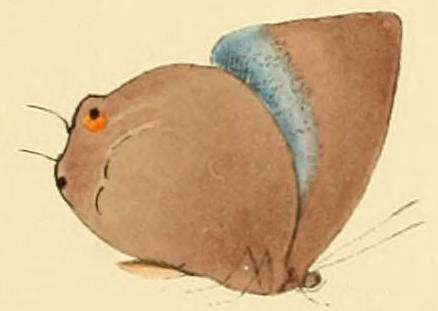

Scientific classification
- Kingdom: Animalia
- Phylum: Arthropoda
- Clade: Pancrustacea
- Class: Insecta
- Order: Lepidoptera
- Family: Lycaenidae
- Subfamily: Theclinae
- Tribe: Iolaini; Riley, 1958

Genera
- Some 20, see text

= Iolaini =

Tribe of butterflies

The Iolaini are a tribe of butterflies in the family Lycaenidae.

== Genera ==
As not all Theclinae have been assigned to tribes, the following list of genera is preliminary:

- Britomartis
- Bullis
- Charana
- Creon
- Dacalana
- Etesiolaus
- Iolaus - includes Argiolaus, Epamera, Iolaphilus
- Jacoona
- Maneca
- Manto
- Mantoides
- Matsutaroa
- Neocheritra
- Paruparo
- Pratapa
- Purlisa
- Rachana - formerly Eliotia (preoccupied)
- Stugeta
- Suasa
- Sukidion
- Tajuria
- Tanuetheira
- Thrix
- Trichiolaus
