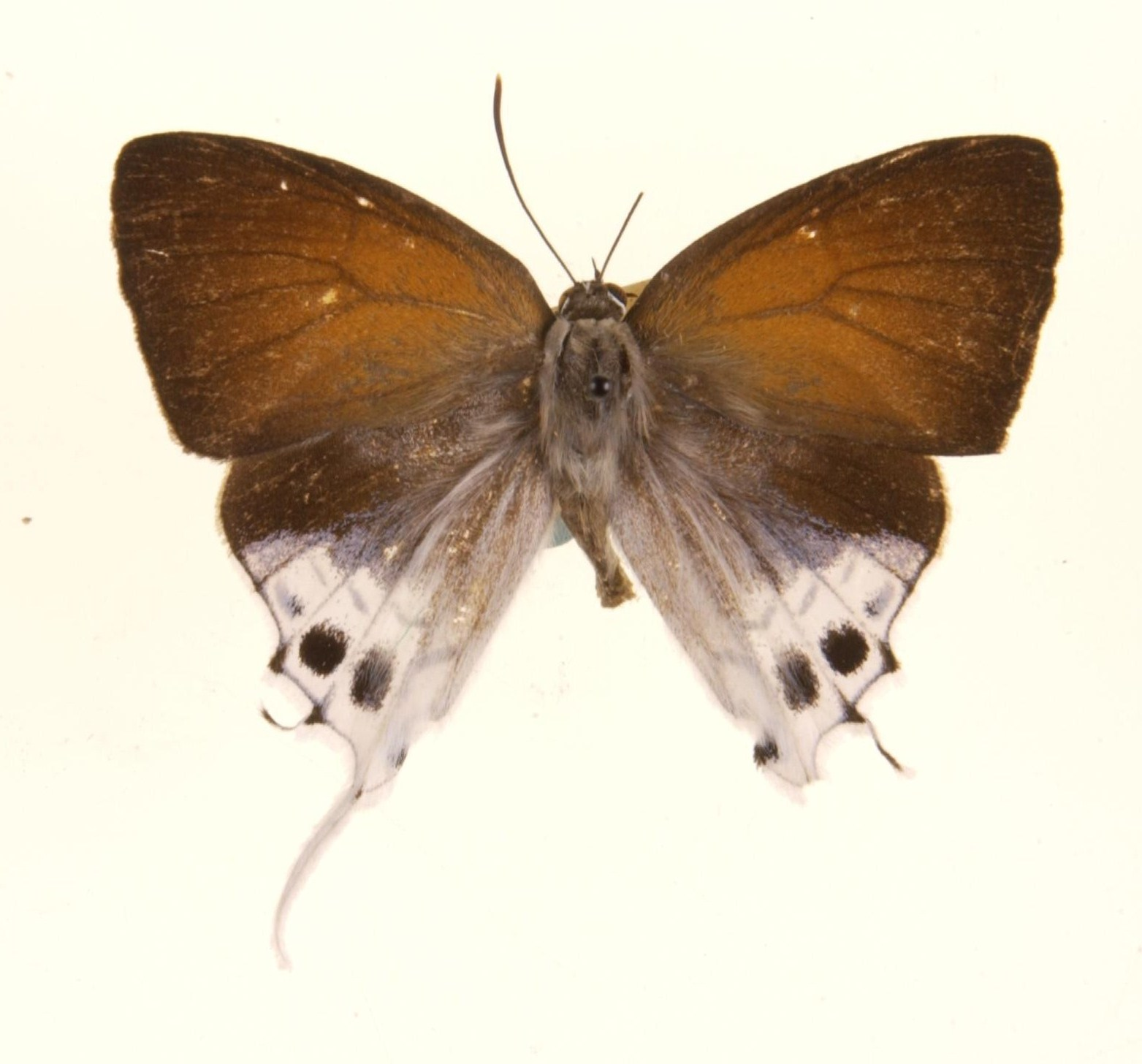
- Mantoides gama gama from Malaya

Scientific classification
- Kingdom: Animalia
- Phylum: Arthropoda
- Class: Insecta
- Order: Lepidoptera
- Family: Lycaenidae
- Tribe: Iolaini
- Genus: Mantoides; H. H. Druce, 1896
- Species: M. gama

Binomial name
- Mantoides gama (Distant, 1886)

= Mantoides =

Monotypic butterfly genus in the family Lycaenidae

Mantoides is a monotypic butterfly genus in the family Lycaenidae erected by Hamilton Herbert Druce in 1896. Its only species, Mantoides gama, the Distant's Imperial, was first described by William Lucas Distant in 1886. It is found in the Indomalayan realm. Whilst the male above resembles yet Neocheritra amrita,, though it has a whiter anal portion of the hindwing, the female above is very much like a Cheritra freja-female, beneath similarly coloured to cloella Weym., from Nias, but the forewing is grey in the basal portion, the rusty-yellow colour is more confined to the apical half, gama is described from Penang, but it occurs also in Sumatra and Borneo.
