= Stugeta mimetica =

Scientific classification
- Kingdom: Animalia
- Phylum: Arthropoda
- Class: Insecta
- Order: Lepidoptera
- Family: Lycaenidae
- Genus: Stugeta
- Species: S. mimetica

Binomial name
- Stugeta mimetica Aurivillius, 1916

Species of butterfly

Stugeta mimetica is a butterfly in the family Lycaenidae. It was described by Per Olof Christopher Aurivillius in 1916. It is found in Tanzania.

The larvae feed on Emelianthe panganensis, Helixanthera tetrapartita and Loranthus species.
