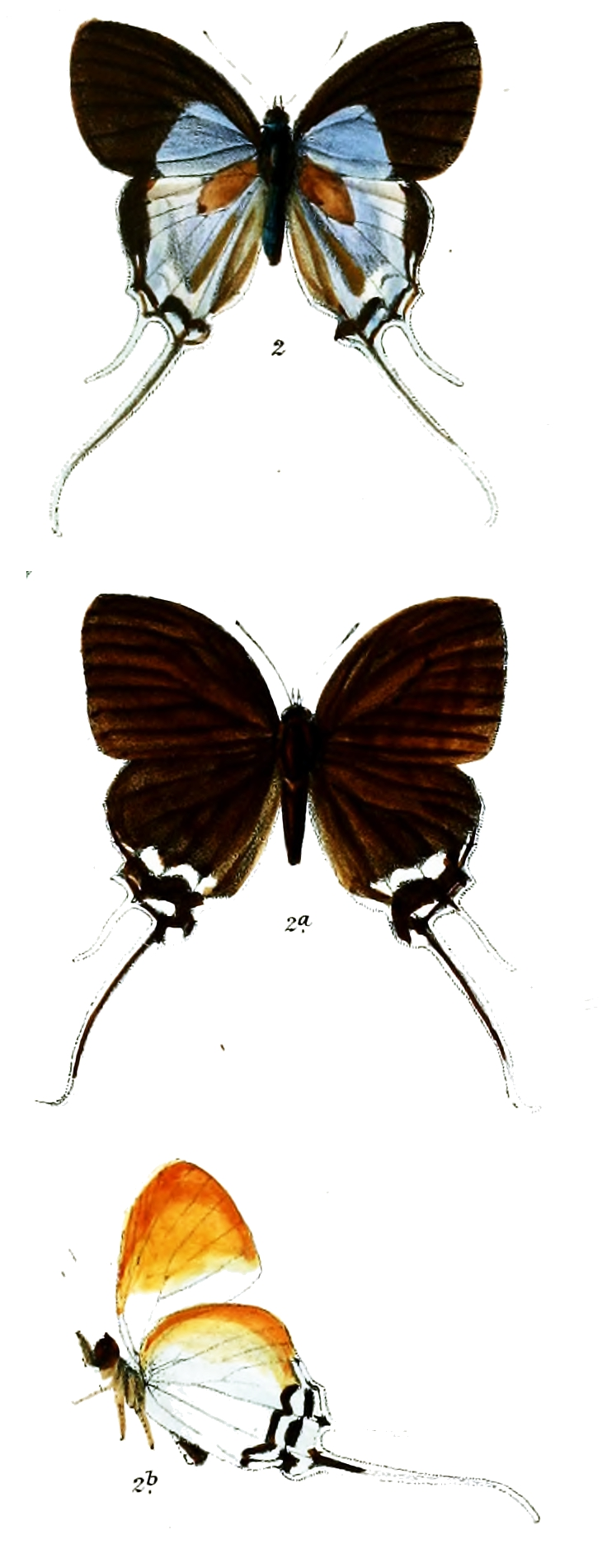
- Neocheritra amrita

Scientific classification
- Kingdom: Animalia
- Phylum: Arthropoda
- Class: Insecta
- Order: Lepidoptera
- Family: Lycaenidae
- Tribe: Iolaini
- Genus: Neocheritra; Distant, 1885

= Neocheritra =

Butterfly genus in family Lycaenidae

Neocheritra is a genus of butterflies in the family Lycaenidae.

== Species ==
- Neocheritra amrita (C. & R. Felder, 1860)
- Neocheritra fabronia (Hewitson, 1878)
- Neocheritra manata (Semper, 1890)
- Neocheritra namoa de Nicéville, 1894
