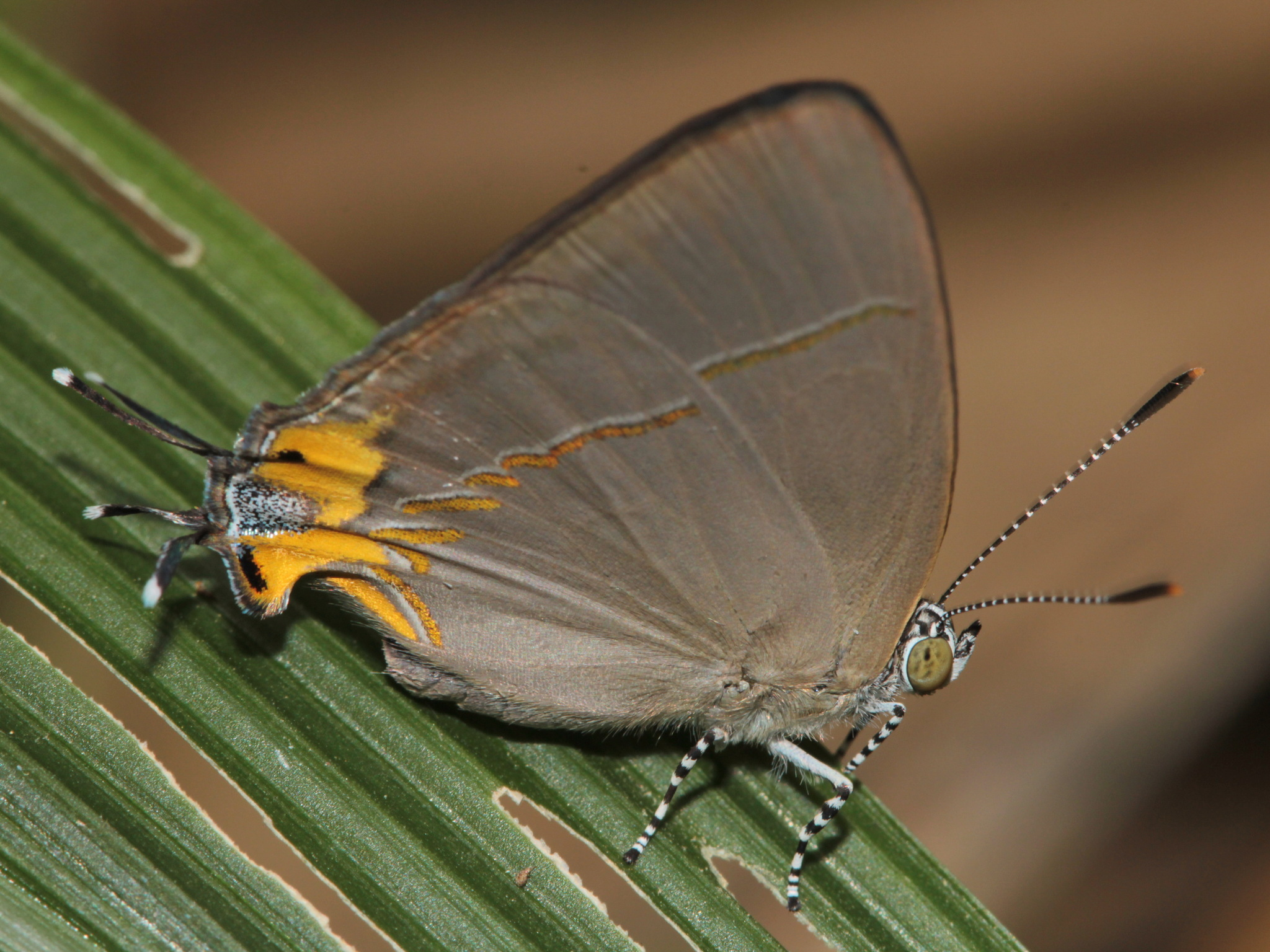

Scientific classification
- Kingdom: Animalia
- Phylum: Arthropoda
- Clade: Pancrustacea
- Class: Insecta
- Order: Lepidoptera
- Family: Lycaenidae
- Genus: Britomartis
- Species: B. cleoboides

Binomial name
- Britomartis cleoboides Elwes, [1893]

Synonyms
- Tajuria cleoboides Fruhstorfer, 1912

= Britomartis cleoboides =

Species of butterfly

Britomartis cleoboides, the azure royal, is a butterfly in the family Lycaenidae. It is found from Sikkim to Thailand and from Peninsular Malaysia to Java.

== Description ==
This species is very similar to Creon cleobis. The male is separated from cleoides by having a large round velvety patch on the upperside forewing, without any blue scales. The female is similar to the male, but it does not have the velvety patch.

== Subspecies ==
This species has three subspecies-

- Britomartis cleoboides cleoboides Elwes, [1893] Sikkim to Laos
- Britomartis cleoboides epigenes Corbet, 1940 Java
- Britomartis cleoboides viga Fruhstorfer, 1912 Peninsular Malaysia and Sumatra
