= Grand Imperial =

Grand Imperial may refer to:

- Grand Imperial (album), a 2006 album by Aceyalone
- Grand Imperial Hotel, a hotel in Kampala, Uganda
- Neocheritra amrita (grand imperial), a butterfly in the family Lycaenidae
