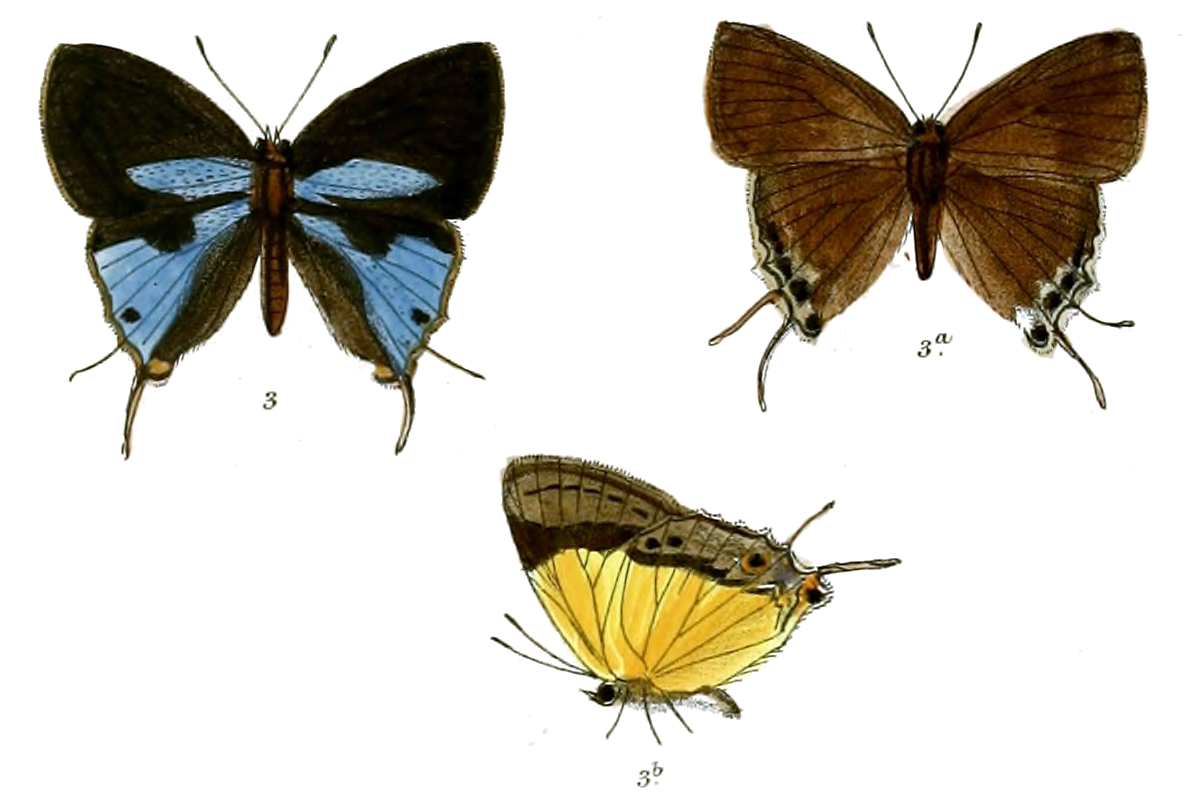
- Illustration in Lepidoptera Indica

Scientific classification
- Kingdom: Animalia
- Phylum: Arthropoda
- Clade: Pancrustacea
- Class: Insecta
- Order: Lepidoptera
- Family: Lycaenidae
- Genus: Charana
- Species: C. cepheis

Binomial name
- Charana cepheis de Nicéville, 1894

= Charana cepheis =

Species of butterfly

Charana cepheis, also known as the Cachar mandarin blue, is a butterfly in the family Lycaenidae. It is found in Assam, Bangladesh, Myanmar and north Vietnam. It was described by Lionel de Nicéville in 1894. This species is monotypic.

== Description ==
The forewing of the upperside of the male is deep blue in the interno-median area. The hindwing of the upperside is a deep blue from the second subcostal nervule to the submedian nervule, the outer margin is narrowly black, the anal lobe is orange-ochreous, and the tails are black, tipped with white. On the underside, both wings have the basal two-thirds pale chrome yellow, and the outer third is purplish brown. The forewing has two brown bands in the purplish-brown area. The hindwing also has two brown bands, one of which is zigzag, and the other is straight. The hindwing cilia are narrowly tipped with white while those of the forewing are black.

This species is very similar to Charana mandarinus, but it is differentiated from it from the following characteristics-

- The blue coloration in cepheis is much darker than in mandarinus. The blue coloration also does not extend to the discoidal cell of the forewing.
- The outer area of both wings on the underside is purplish-brown instead of rufous.
- The macular bands of the forewing touch at both ends instead of being parallel.
- There is no white band in between the zigzag band and the abdominal margin.

This species was described from two males collected from Nemotha, a mountain in Cachar in 1892, at the same time and place where a specimen of C. mandarinus was collected.
