= Stugeta carpenteri =

Scientific classification
- Kingdom: Animalia
- Phylum: Arthropoda
- Class: Insecta
- Order: Lepidoptera
- Family: Lycaenidae
- Genus: Stugeta
- Species: S. carpenteri

Binomial name
- Stugeta carpenteri Stempffer, 1946

Species of butterfly

Stugeta carpenteri, the Carpenter's sapphire, is a species of butterfly in the family Lycaenidae. It is found in eastern Kenya. The habitat consists of arid savanna.

Adults of both sexes are attracted to flowers.

The larvae feed on Oncocalyx fischeri and Emelianthe panganensis.

== Etymology ==
It is named for Hale Carpenter.
