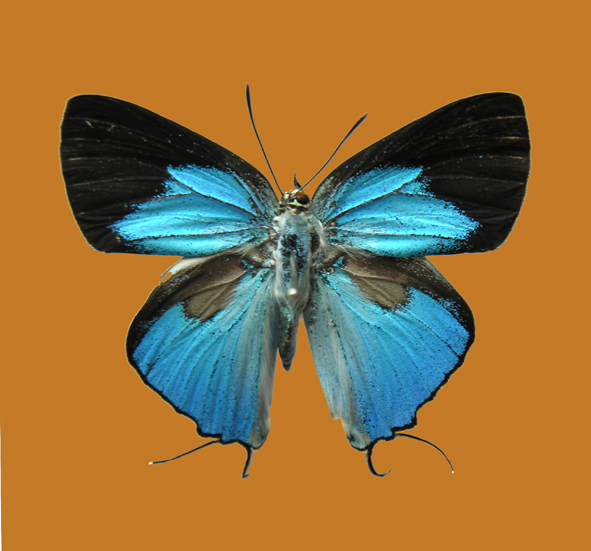
- Male upperside
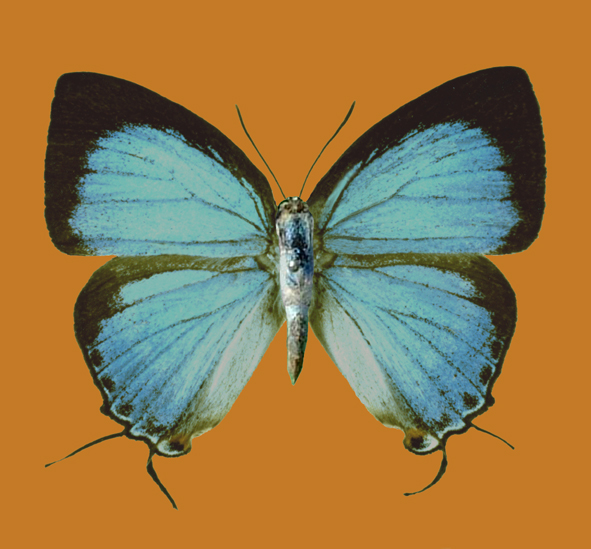
- Female upperside

Scientific classification
- Kingdom: Animalia
- Phylum: Arthropoda
- Class: Insecta
- Order: Lepidoptera
- Family: Lycaenidae
- Tribe: Iolaini
- Genus: Matsutaroa; H. Hayashi, Schrὃder & Treadaway 1984
- Species: M. iljai

Binomial name
- Matsutaroa iljai Hayashi, Schröder & Treadaway, 1984

= Matsutaroa =

Monotypic butterfly genus in family Lycaenidae

Matsutaroa is a butterfly genus in the family Lycaenidae. It is nearest to the genus Ancema, but differs from it in the following points: (1) veins 5 and 6 on the forewing are not very close at their origins, but in Ancema they are very close at their origins; (2) the ground colour of the underside of the male is white, tinged with pale yellow and blue and has no shade of silver, but in the genus Ancema the ground colour of the underside is more or less tinged with silver; (3) in the male genitalia the valva is stout, a short brachial process is separating from the dorsum of the valva, and the phallus is stout, but in Ancema the valva is slender, a long brachial process separating from the ventral direction of valva, and the phallus is very slender.

Matsutaroa is a monotypic genus, containing only Matsutaroa iljai. It is endemic to the Philippines and found on the islands of Masbate, Negros and Panay. Its forewing length is 18–20 mm. The appearance of male and female is quite different. On Kanlaon Volcano of Negros it occurs once a year (June to August) and is frequently found on red flowers.

The generic name is dedicated to Mr. Matsutaro Hayashi, the father of the first author.

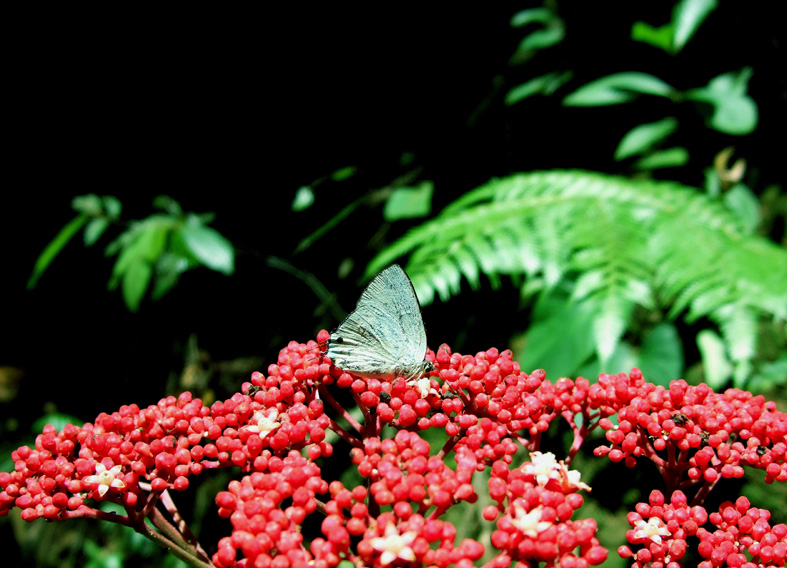
Male, Kanlaon Volcano, Negros, Philippines

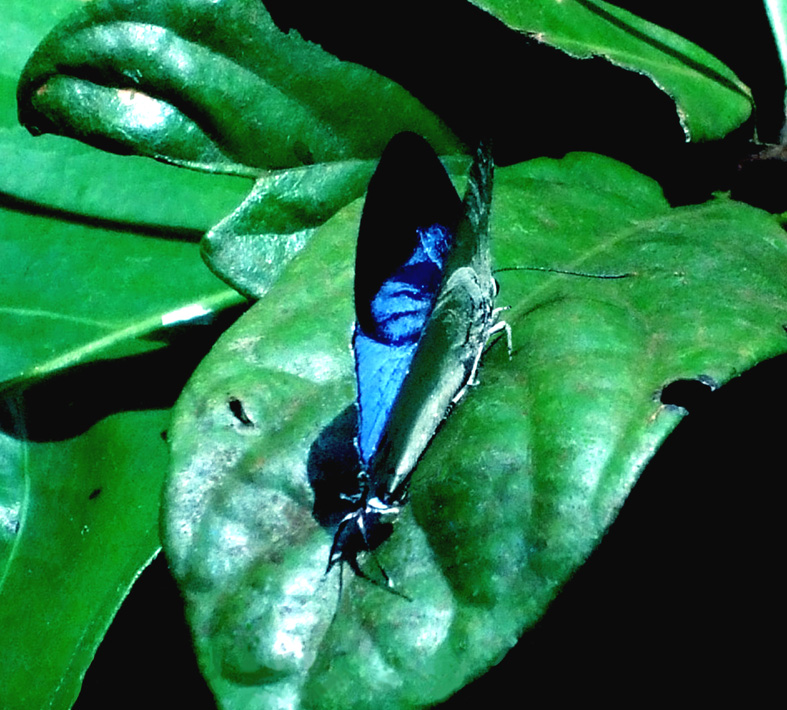
Male, Kanlaon Volcano
