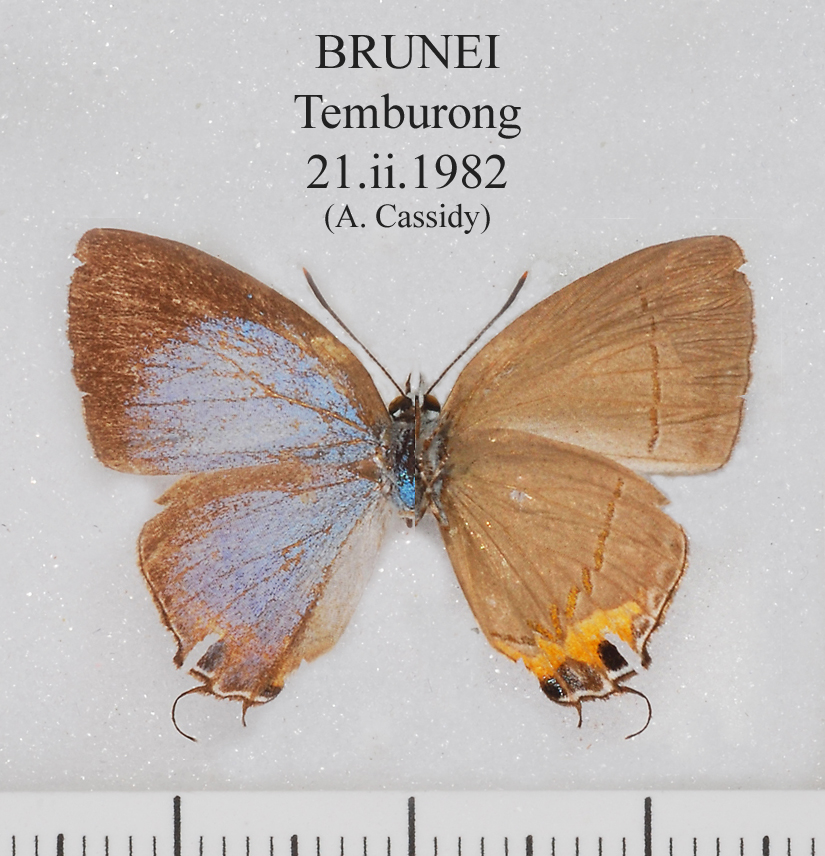
- Bullis buto Brunei

Scientific classification
- Domain: Eukaryota
- Kingdom: Animalia
- Phylum: Arthropoda
- Class: Insecta
- Order: Lepidoptera
- Family: Lycaenidae
- Tribe: Iolaini
- Genus: Bullis de Nicéville, 1897

= Bullis (butterfly) =

Butterfly genus in family Lycaenidae

Bullis is an Indomalayan genus of butterflies in the family Lycaenidae.

== Species ==
- Bullis elioti (Corbet, 1940) Peninsular Malaya and Borneo
- Bullis buto (de Nicéville, 1895) - baby royal
- Bullis stigmata (Druce, 1904) Peninsular Malaya, Borneo, Sumatra, Singapore, Thailand
