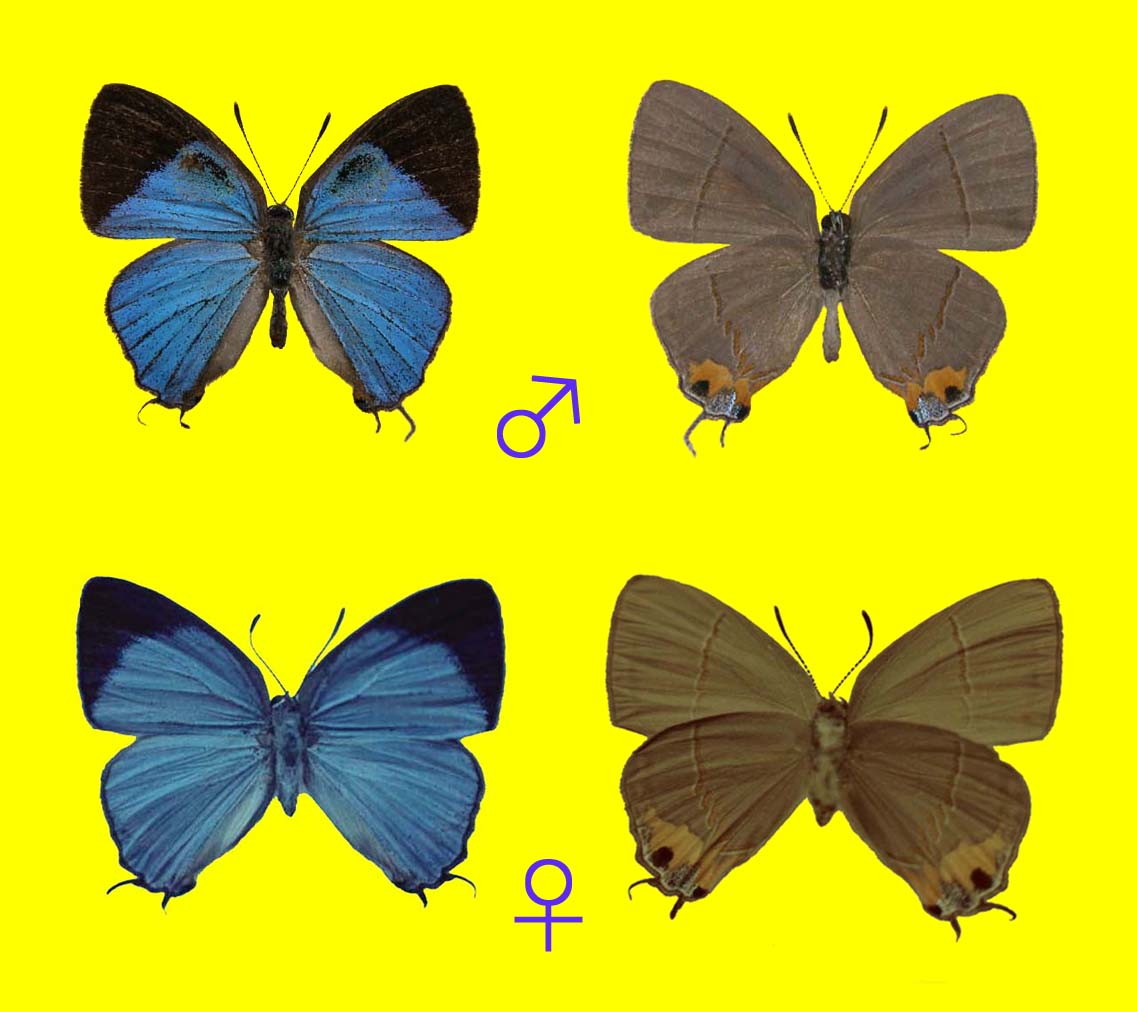
- Britomartis igarashii

Scientific classification
- Kingdom: Animalia
- Phylum: Arthropoda
- Class: Insecta
- Order: Lepidoptera
- Family: Lycaenidae
- Tribe: Iolaini
- Genus: Britomartis de Nicéville, 1895

= Britomartis (butterfly) =

Butterfly genus in family Lycaenidae

Britomartis is a genus of butterflies in the family Lycaenidae.

The genus, which was erected by Lionel de Nicéville in 1895 has two members:

- Britomartis cleoboides (Elwes, [1893]) Sikkim - Burma
  - B. cleoboides viga (Corbet, 1940) Thailand, Peninsular Malaya, Sumatra
  - B. cleoboides epigenes (Fruhstorfer, 1912) Java, Bali
- Britomartis igarashii Hayashi, 1976 Borneo, Palawan
