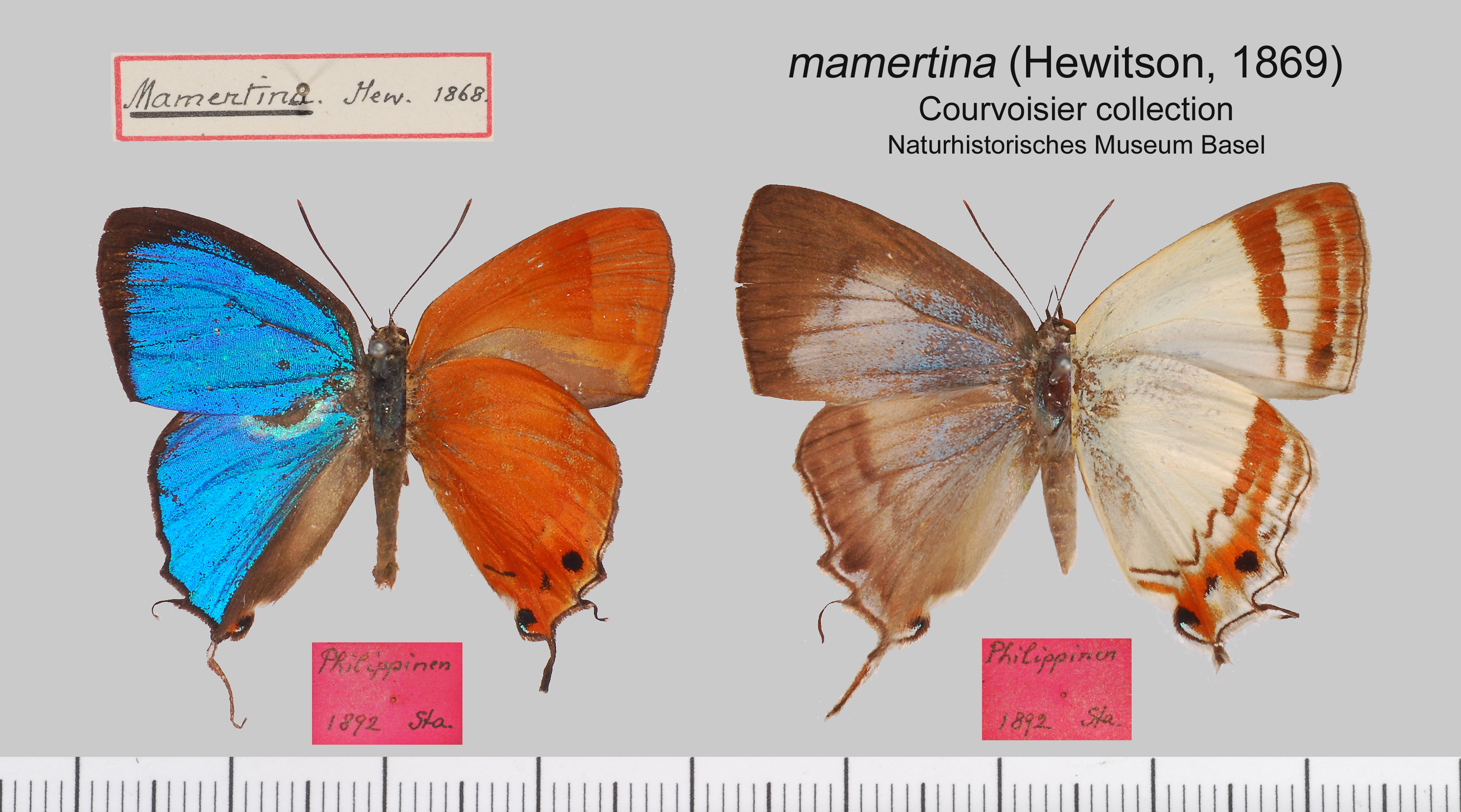
- Paruparo mamertina Courvoisier Collection, Basel

Scientific classification
- Kingdom: Animalia
- Phylum: Arthropoda
- Clade: Pancrustacea
- Class: Insecta
- Order: Lepidoptera
- Family: Lycaenidae
- Genus: Paruparo
- Species: P. mamertina

Binomial name
- Paruparo mamertina (Hewitson, 1869)

Synonyms
- Myrina mamertina Hewitson, 1869; Pratapa mamertina rahmanni Jumalon, 1975

= Paruparo mamertina =

Species of butterfly

Paruparo mamertina is a butterfly in the family Lycaenidae. It was described by William Chapman Hewitson in 1869. It is found in the Philippines in the Indomalayan realm.

== Subspecies ==
- Paruparo mamertina mamertina (Philippines)
- Paruparo mamertina rahmanni (Jumalon, 1975) (Leyte)
- Paruparo mamertina jeanhooperae Schröder & Treadaway, 1988 (Homonhon Island, Bitaugan)
