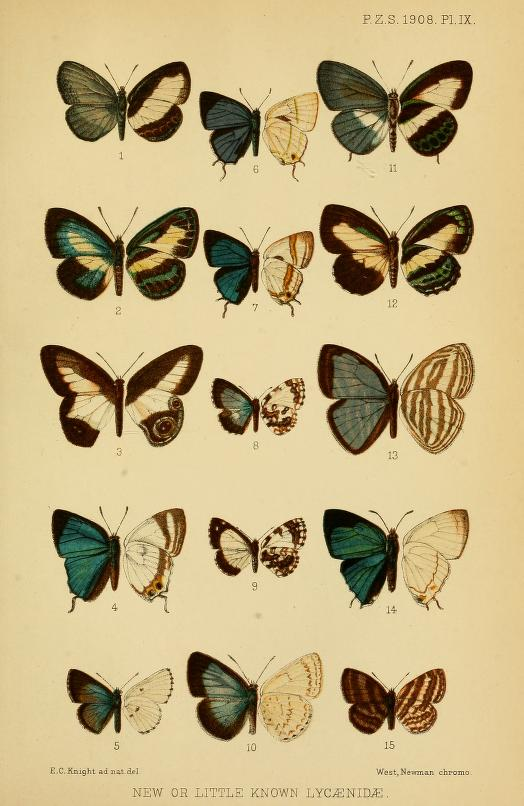
- Etesiolaus catori, figure 14

Scientific classification
- Kingdom: Animalia
- Phylum: Arthropoda
- Class: Insecta
- Order: Lepidoptera
- Family: Lycaenidae
- Tribe: Iolaini
- Genus: Etesiolaus; Stempffer & Bennett, 1959

= Etesiolaus =

Butterfly genus in family Lycaenidae

Etesiolaus is a genus of butterflies in the family Lycaenidae. The species of this genus are found in the Afrotropical realm.

== Taxonomy ==
The genus was previously treated as a subgenus of Iolaus, but was raised to genus level by Collins et al. in 2003.

== Species ==
- Etesiolaus catori (Bethune-Baker, 1904)
- Etesiolaus kyabobo (Larsen, 1996)
- Etesiolaus pinheyi Kielland, 1986
