= Stugeta occidentalis =

Scientific classification
- Kingdom: Animalia
- Phylum: Arthropoda
- Class: Insecta
- Order: Lepidoptera
- Family: Lycaenidae
- Genus: Stugeta
- Species: S. occidentalis

Binomial name
- Stugeta occidentalis Stempffer & Bennett, 1958

Synonyms
- Stugeta bowkeri occidentalis Stempffer & Bennett, 1958

Species of butterfly

Stugeta occidentalis, the western marbled sapphire, is a butterfly in the family Lycaenidae. It is found in Sierra Leone. The habitat consists of savanna.
