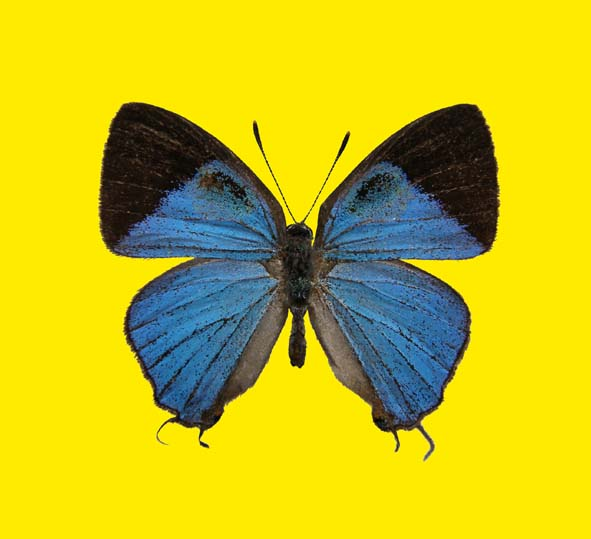
- Male upperside
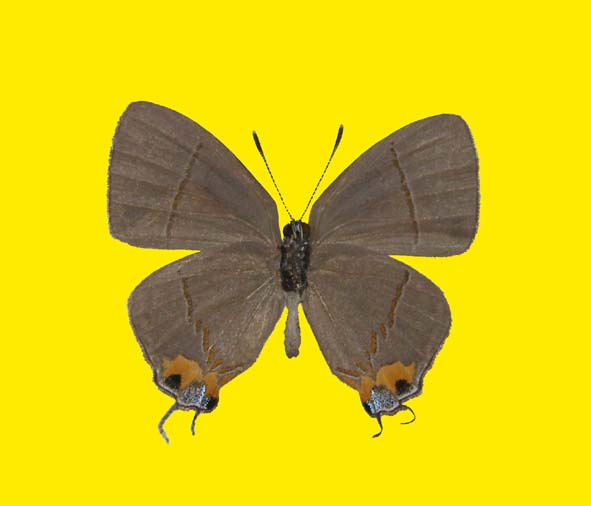
- Male underside

Scientific classification
- Kingdom: Animalia
- Phylum: Arthropoda
- Class: Insecta
- Order: Lepidoptera
- Family: Lycaenidae
- Genus: Britomartis
- Species: B. igarashii

Binomial name
- Britomartis igarashii (H. Hayashi, 1976)

Synonyms
- Britomartis cleoboides igarashii H. Hayashi, 1976 was changed the status to Britomartis igarashii by Holloway, J.D., 1984.

= Britomartis igarashii =

Species of butterfly

Britomartis igarashii is a butterfly of the family Lycaenidae. Forewing length: 14–15 mm. It is endemic to Borneo and is distributed only in mountainous areas (Mount Kinabalu and Mount Mulu). It is a rare species. Some specimens were taken at night in light traps.

Etymology. The specific name is dedicated to Dr. Suguru IGARASHI, the Japanese lepidopterist.
