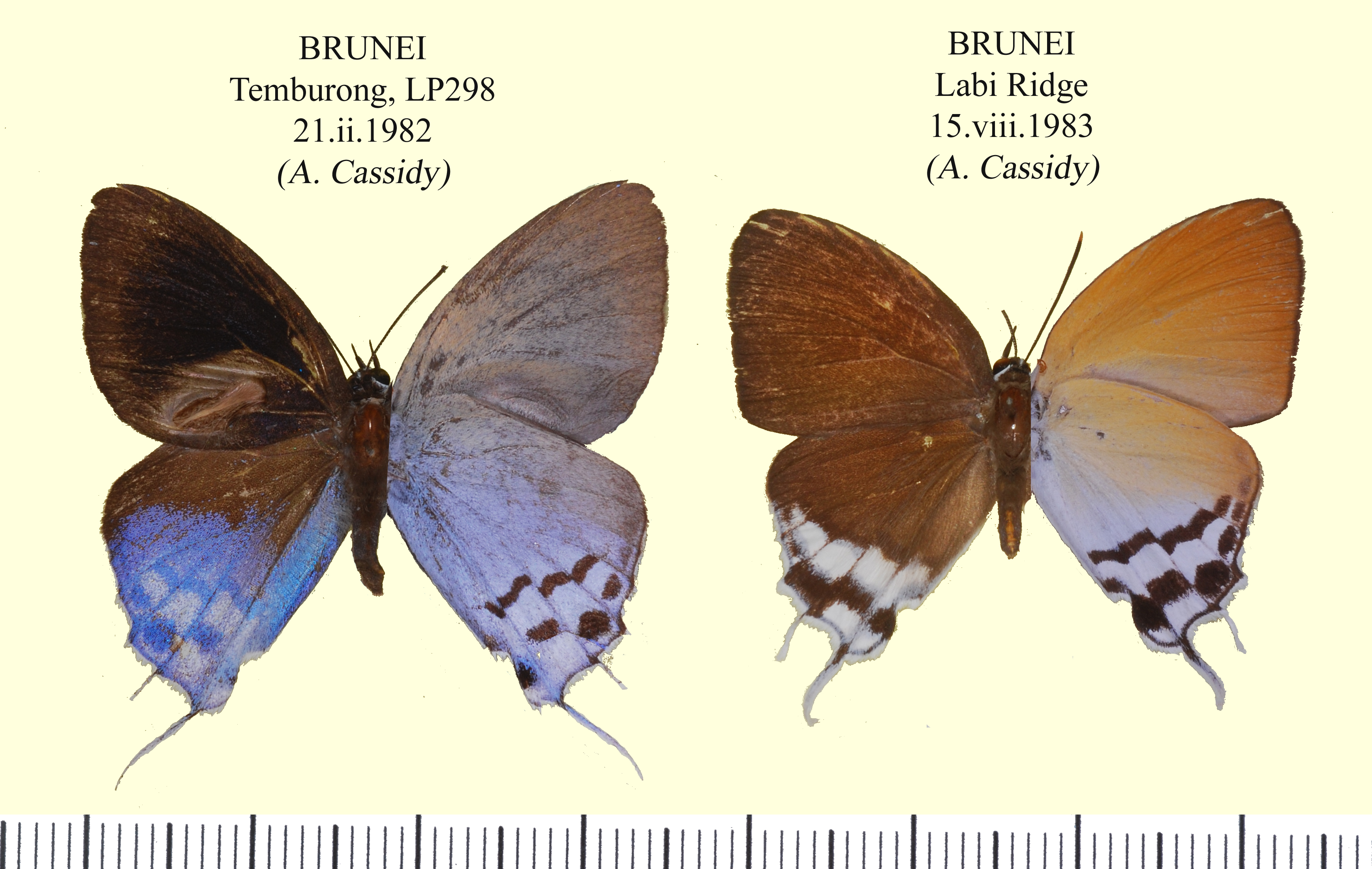
- Thrix scopula scopula from Brunei
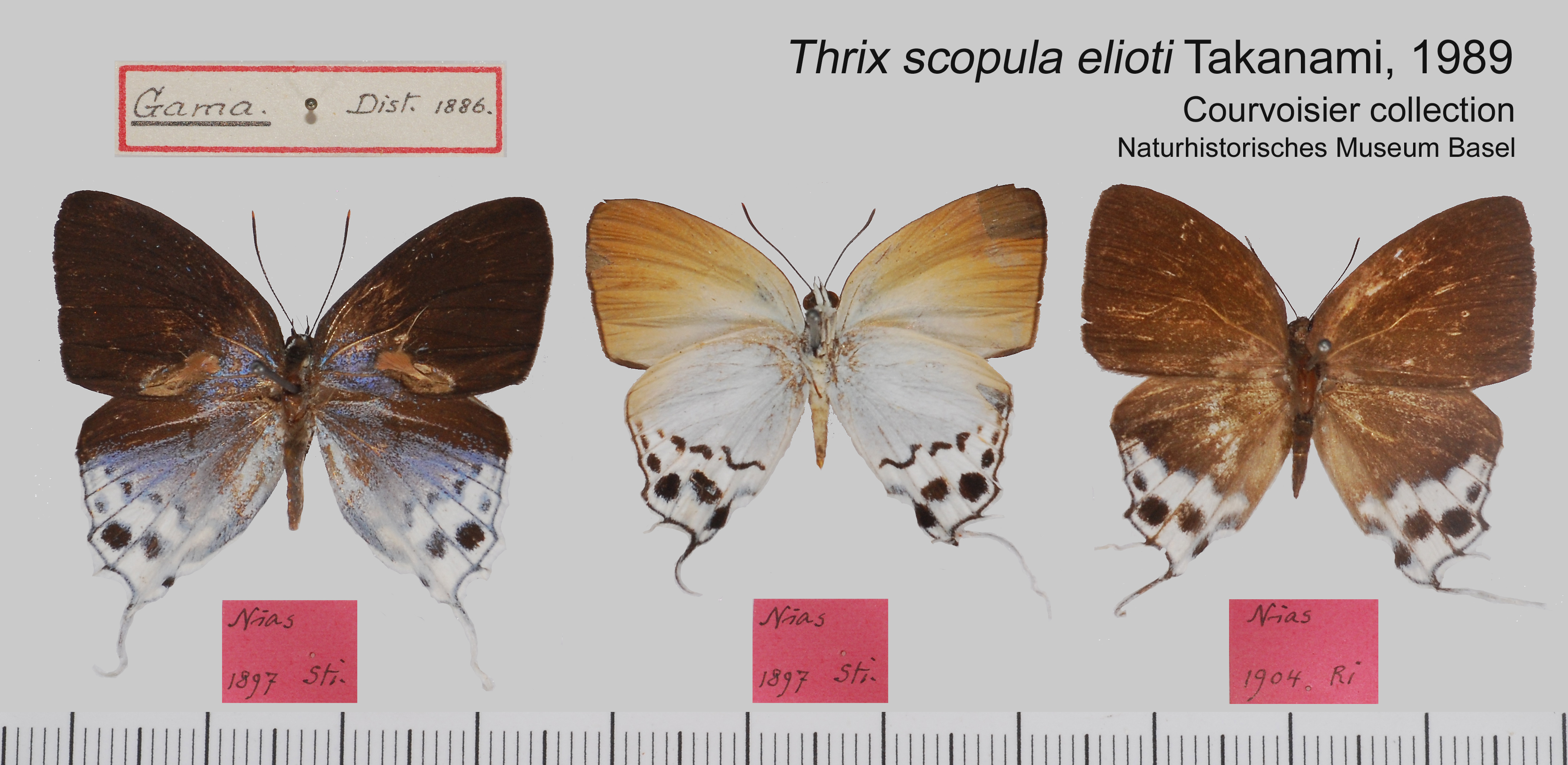
- Thrix scopula elioti from the Courvoisier Collection, Basel, Switzerland

Scientific classification
- Domain: Eukaryota
- Kingdom: Animalia
- Phylum: Arthropoda
- Class: Insecta
- Order: Lepidoptera
- Family: Lycaenidae
- Tribe: Iolaini
- Genus: Thrix; Doherty, 1891
- Species: T. scopula

Binomial name
- Thrix scopula (H. Druce, 1873)

= Thrix =

Monotypic butterfly genus in family Lycaenidae

Thrix is a monotypic butterfly genus in the family Lycaenidae first described by William Doherty in 1891. Its one species is Thrix scopula, which was first described by Herbert Druce in 1873. It is found in the Indomalayan realm (in Borneo, Thailand, Sumatra and Peninsular Malaya).

== Subspecies ==
- T. s. scopula Borneo, Sumatra
- T. s. nisibis (de Nicéville, 1895) Peninsular Malaya
- T. s. elioti Takanami, 1989 Nias Island
