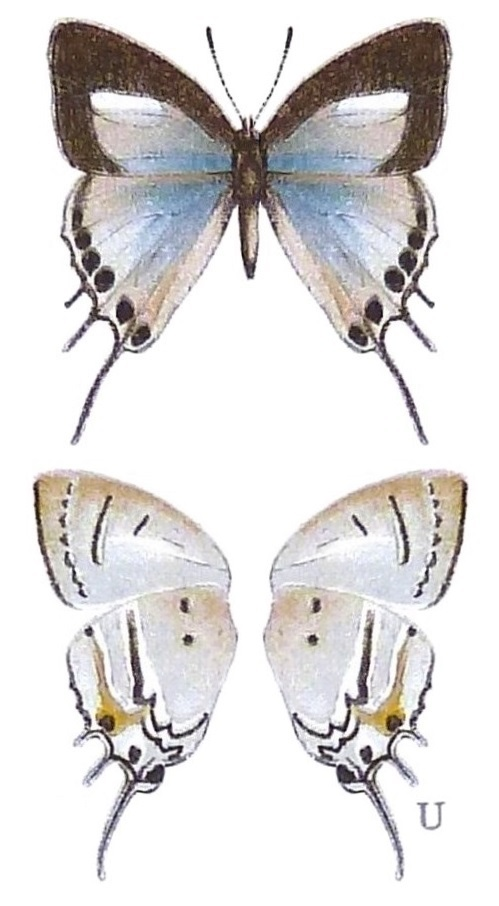
- Trichiolaus mermeros

Scientific classification
- Kingdom: Animalia
- Phylum: Arthropoda
- Class: Insecta
- Order: Lepidoptera
- Family: Lycaenidae
- Genus: Trichiolaus; Aurivillius, 1898

= Trichiolaus =

Butterfly genus or subgenus in family Lycaenidae

Trichiolaus is a genus of butterflies in the family Lycaenidae. Other sources treat it as a subgenus of Iolaus. It occurs in Madagascar.

== Species ==
There are two recognized species:

- Trichiolaus argentarius (Butler, 1879)
- Trichiolaus mermeros (Mabille, 1878)
