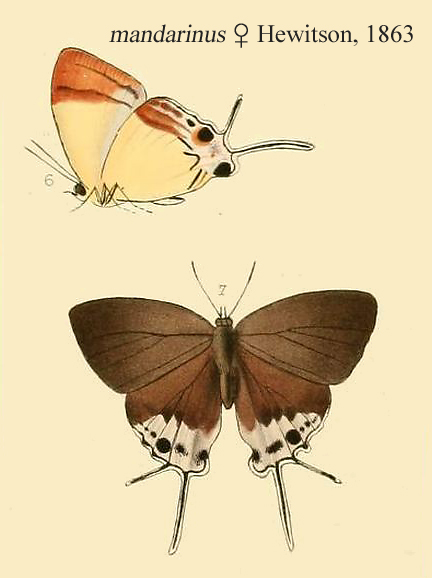
- Charana mandarinus

Scientific classification
- Kingdom: Animalia
- Phylum: Arthropoda
- Class: Insecta
- Order: Lepidoptera
- Family: Lycaenidae
- Subfamily: Theclinae
- Tribe: Iolaini
- Genus: Charana de Nicéville, 1890

= Charana =

Butterfly genus in family Lycaenidae

Charana is an Indomalayan genus of hairstreak butterflies in the family Lycaenidae.

== Species ==
- Charana mandarinus (Hewitson, 1863)
- Charana cepheis de Nicéville, 1894 Assam
