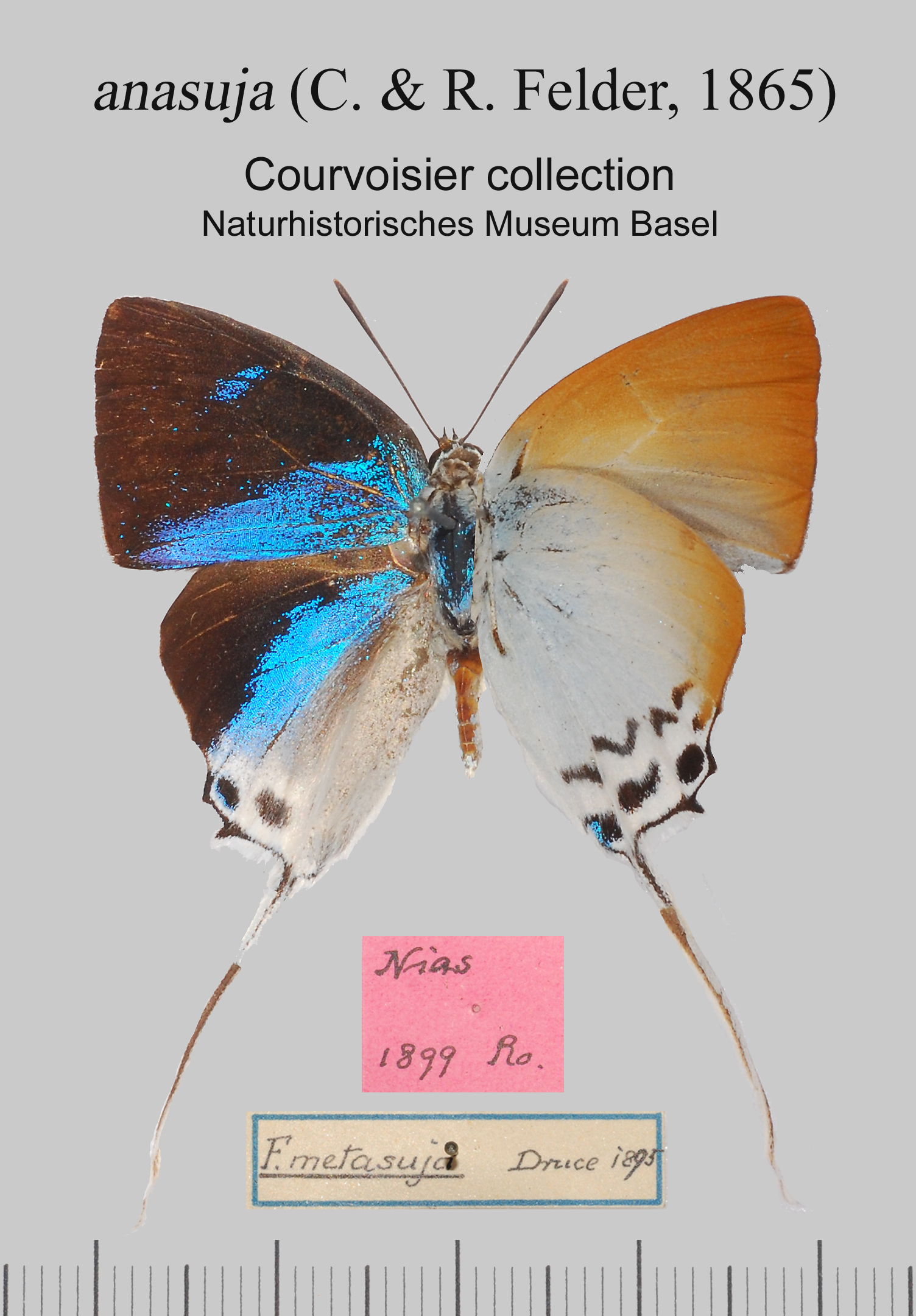

Scientific classification
- Kingdom: Animalia
- Phylum: Arthropoda
- Clade: Pancrustacea
- Class: Insecta
- Order: Lepidoptera
- Family: Lycaenidae
- Genus: Jacoona
- Species: J. anasuja

Binomial name
- Jacoona anasuja C. Felder & R. Felder, 1865

Synonyms
- Myrina anasuja C. & R. Felder, 1865; Jacoona jusana Druce, 1895; Jacoona metasuja Druce, 1895

= Jacoona anasuja =

Species of butterfly

Jacoona anasuja is a butterfly in the family Lycaenidae. It was described by Cajetan Felder and Rudolf Felder in 1865. It is found in the Indomalayan realm.

The larvae feed on Scurrula ferruginea.

== Description ==
Male with a large scent-reflection at the costa of the hindwing; the posterior portions of both the wings above metallic greenish-blue. Under surface at the margin and apex of the wings ochreous, towards the base paler; before the small tails blackish markings.

== Subspecies ==
- Jacoona anasuja anasuja (Borneo, Sumatra, Peninsular Malaysia, Singapore)
- Jacoona anasuja jusana Druce, 1895 (northern Borneo)
- Jacoona anasuja nigerrima Corbet, 1948 (southern Burma, Thailand, Laos)
