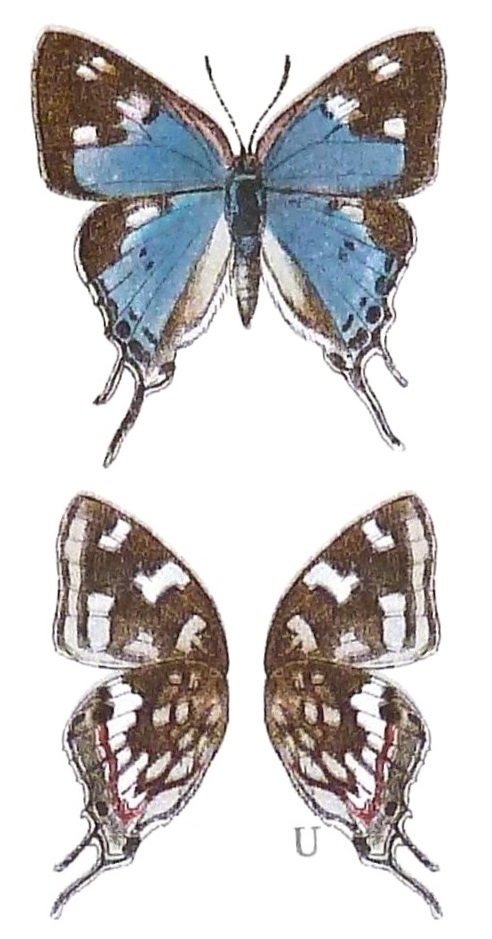
- In Seitz (1910)

Scientific classification
- Kingdom: Animalia
- Phylum: Arthropoda
- Class: Insecta
- Order: Lepidoptera
- Family: Lycaenidae
- Genus: Stugeta
- Species: S. subinfuscata

Binomial name
- Stugeta subinfuscata (Grünberg, 1910)

Synonyms
- Iolaus subinfuscata (Grünberg, 1910); Stugeta bowkeri subinfuscata Grünberg, 1910

= Stugeta subinfuscata =

Dusky sapphire

Species of butterfly

Stugeta subinfuscata, the dusky sapphire, is a butterfly of the family Lycaenidae. It is found in southern Africa.

== Description ==
The wingspan is 25–28 mm for males and 27–30 mm for females. Adults are on wing in summer, with peaks in September and October. There are multiple generations per year.

Individuals in and around Witsand feature darker markings on their forewings, compared to specimens from other regions.

== Habitat and behavior ==
The larvae feed on Tapinanthus oleifolius.

== Subspecies ==
- Iolaus subinfuscata subinfuscata
- Iolaus subinfuscata reynoldsi Dickson, 1980 — (succulent karoo and arid savannah in Northern Cape from Garies to Upington and Kuruman, north to Namibia and Botswana)
