= Etesiolaus pinheyi =

Scientific classification
- Kingdom: Animalia
- Phylum: Arthropoda
- Class: Insecta
- Order: Lepidoptera
- Family: Lycaenidae
- Genus: Etesiolaus
- Species: E. pinheyi

Binomial name
- Etesiolaus pinheyi Kielland, 1986

Synonyms
- Iolaus pinheyi

Species of butterfly

Etesiolaus pinheyi is a butterfly in the family Lycaenidae. It is found in north-eastern Tanzania.
