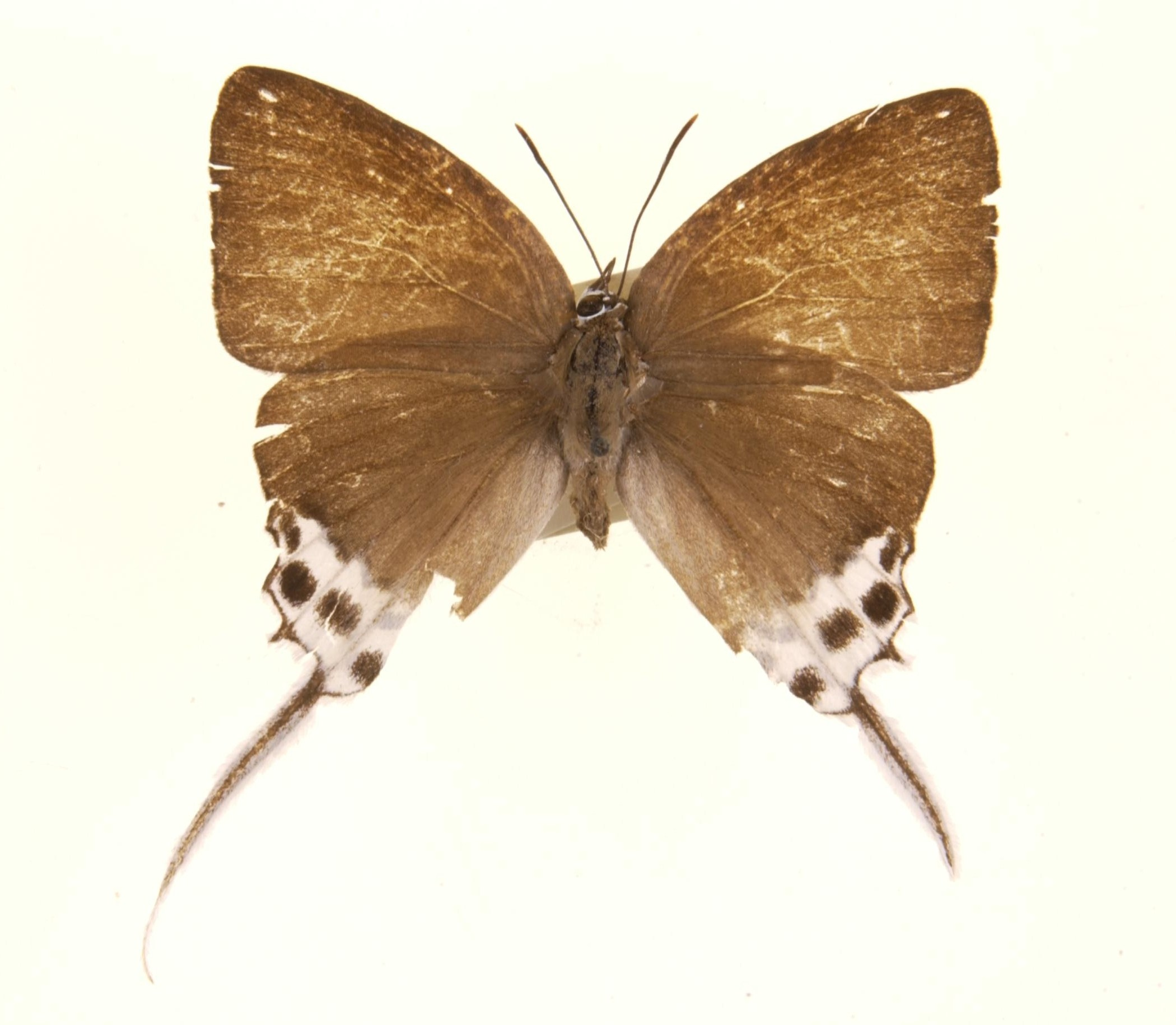
- Specimen of Jacoona anasuja from Malaya

Scientific classification
- Kingdom: Animalia
- Phylum: Arthropoda
- Class: Insecta
- Order: Lepidoptera
- Family: Lycaenidae
- Tribe: Iolaini
- Genus: Jacoona; Distant, 1884

= Jacoona =

Butterfly genus in family Lycaenidae

Jacoona is a genus of butterflies in the family Lycaenidae. The three species of this genus are found in the Indomalayan realm.

== Species ==
- Jacoona anasuja (C. & R. Felder, 1865)
- Jacoona irmina Fruhstorfer, 1904
- Jacoona fabronia (Hewitson，[1878])
