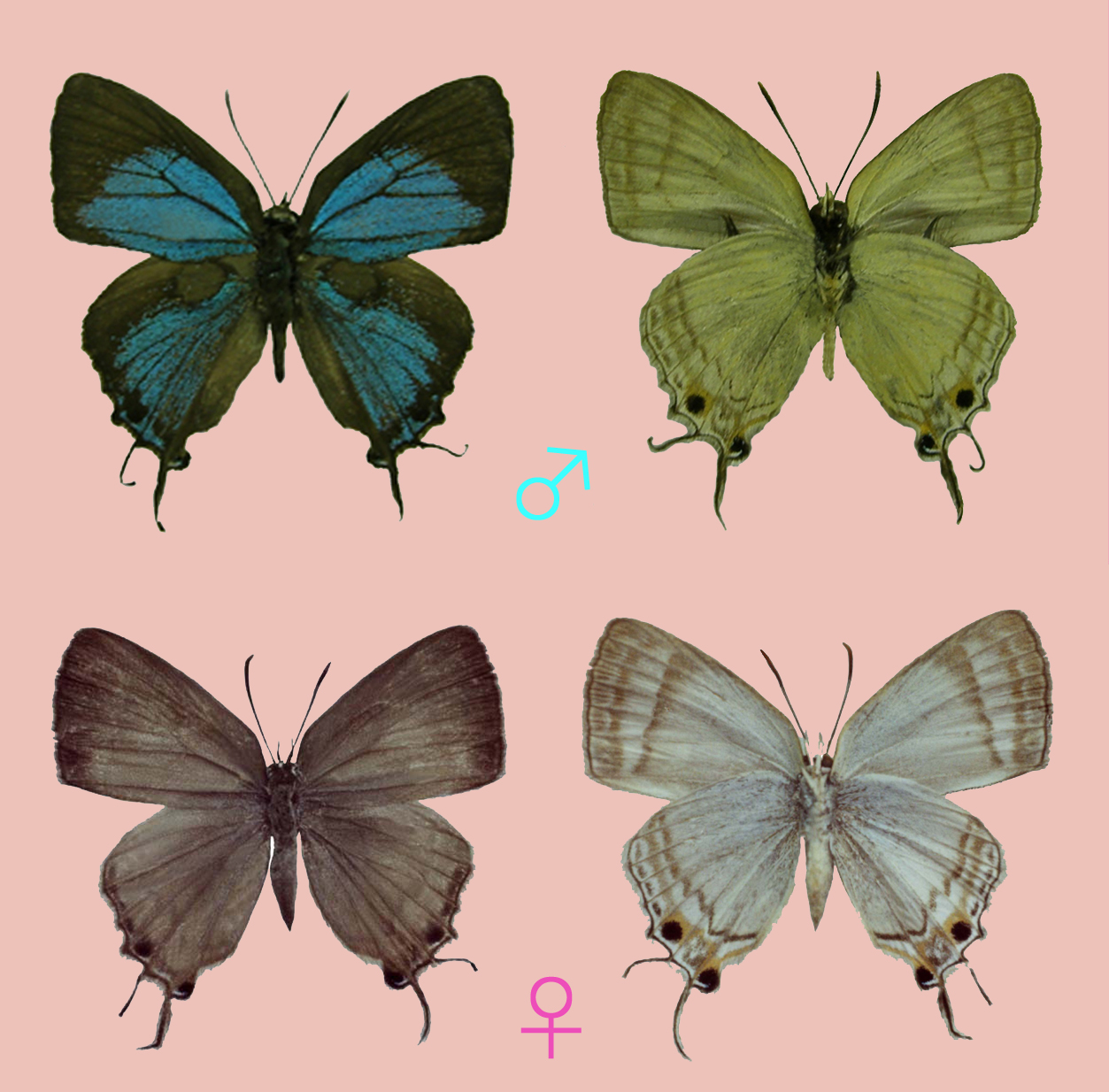
- Male and female

Scientific classification
- Kingdom: Animalia
- Phylum: Arthropoda
- Class: Insecta
- Order: Lepidoptera
- Family: Lycaenidae
- Genus: Paruparo
- Species: P. mio

Binomial name
- Paruparo mio H. Hayashi, Schroeder & Treadaway, 1984

= Paruparo mio =

Species of butterfly

Paruparo mio is a butterfly of the family Lycaenidae first described by Hisakazu Hayashi, Heinz G. Schroeder and Colin G. Treadaway in 1984. It is endemic to the Philippine island of Mindanao. Forewing length: 16–17 mm. It is a quite rare species and the threat category is "vulnerable".

The specific name is dedicated to the eldest daughter of the first author.
