= Etesiolaus kyabobo =

Scientific classification
- Kingdom: Animalia
- Phylum: Arthropoda
- Clade: Pancrustacea
- Class: Insecta
- Order: Lepidoptera
- Family: Lycaenidae
- Genus: Etesiolaus
- Species: E. kyabobo

Binomial name
- Etesiolaus kyabobo (Larsen, 1996)

Synonyms
- Iolaus (Etesiolaus) kyabobo Larsen, 1996; Iolaus kyabobo

Species of butterfly

Etesiolaus kyabobo, the Kyabobo green sapphire, is a butterfly in the family Lycaenidae. It is found in Guinea, Ivory Coast, Ghana (the Volta Region), the Central African Republic and the eastern part of the Democratic Republic of the Congo. The habitat consists of dry, semi-deciduous forests.

Adults have been recorded in January and May.

Torben Larsen developed a species numbering system for his 2005 publication Butterflies of West Africa. This species is #440. The 'Larsen' numbers have since been used with permission in A Sharp Eye on Butterflies of Ghana.
