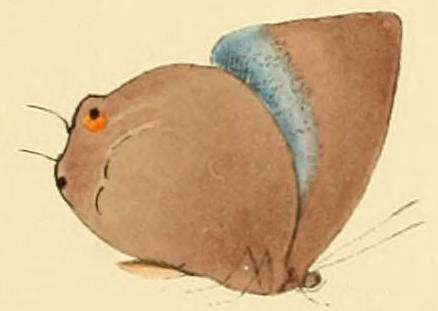

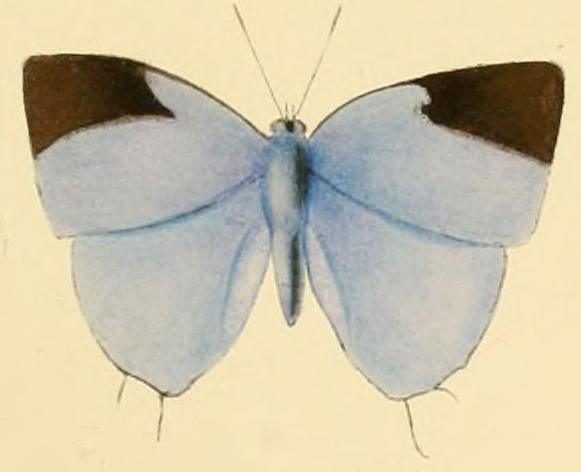

Scientific classification
- Kingdom: Animalia
- Phylum: Arthropoda
- Class: Insecta
- Order: Lepidoptera
- Family: Lycaenidae
- Tribe: Iolaini
- Genus: Sukidion; H. H. Druce, 1891
- Species: S. inores

Binomial name
- Sukidion inores (Hewitson, 1872)

Synonyms
- Iolaus inores Hewitson, 1872

= Sukidion =

Monotypic butterfly genus in family Lycaenidae

Sukidion is a monotypic butterfly genus in the family Lycaenidae erected by Hamilton Herbert Druce in 1891. Its only species, Sukidion inores, was first described by William Chapman Hewitson in 1872. It is endemic to Borneo.
