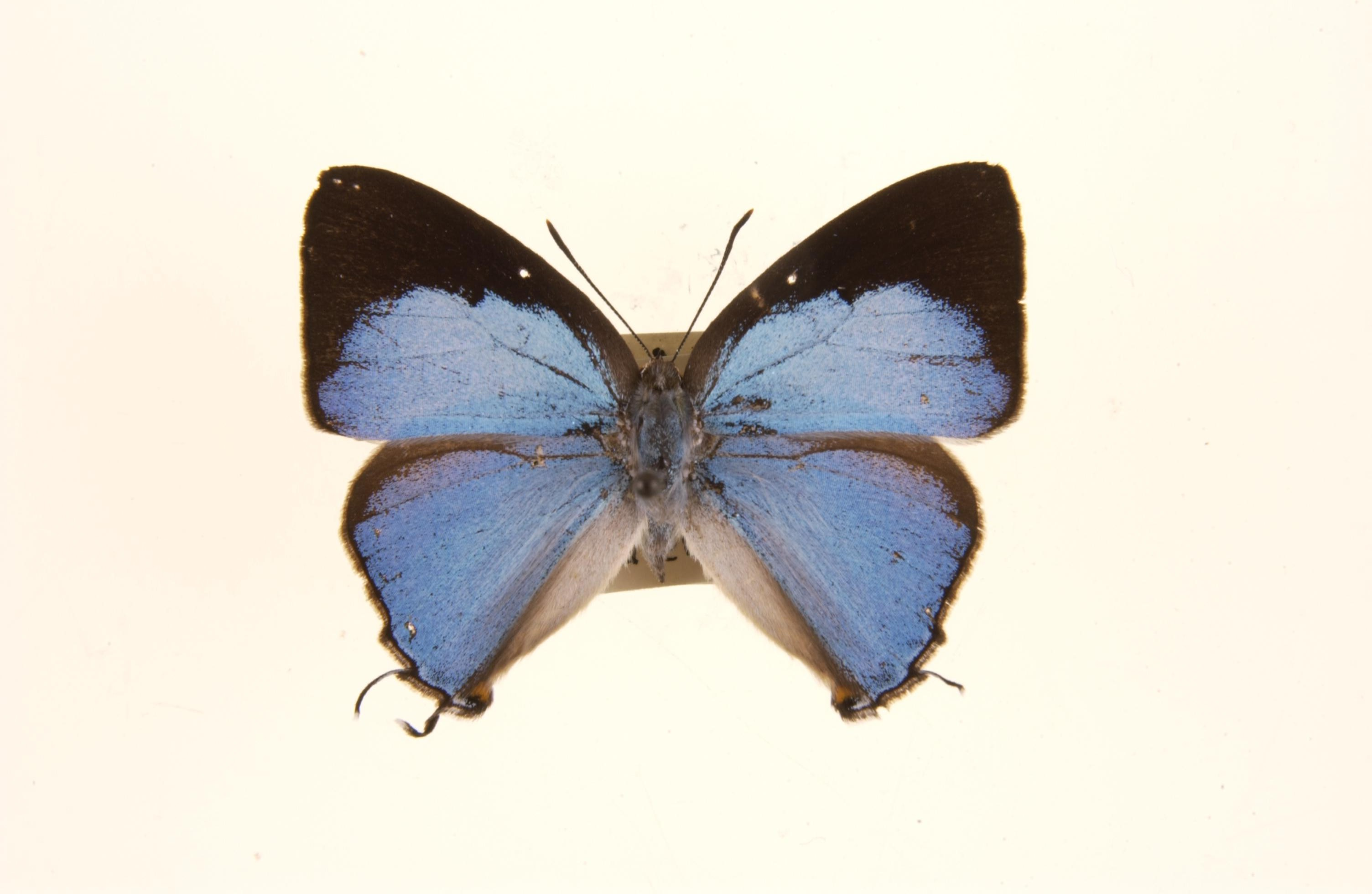

Scientific classification
- Kingdom: Animalia
- Phylum: Arthropoda
- Class: Insecta
- Order: Lepidoptera
- Family: Lycaenidae
- Genus: Bullis
- Species: B. buto

Binomial name
- Bullis buto de Nicéville, 1895

= Bullis buto =

Species of butterfly

Bullis buto, the baby royal, is a species of lycaenid or blue butterfly found in Southeast Asia (Assam, Burma, Thailand, Peninsular Malaya).
