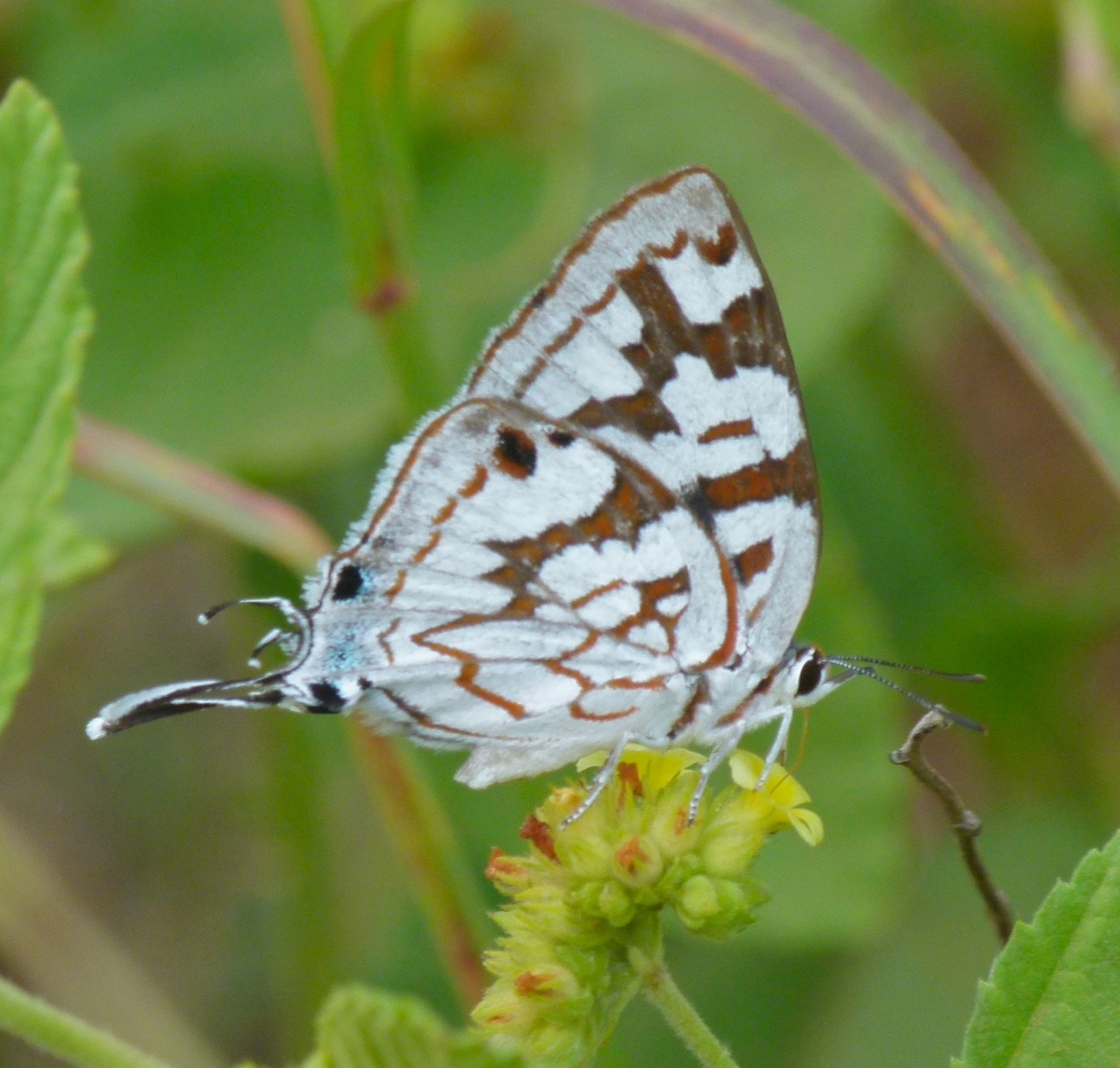
- Stugeta bowkeri

Scientific classification
- Kingdom: Animalia
- Phylum: Arthropoda
- Class: Insecta
- Order: Lepidoptera
- Family: Lycaenidae
- Tribe: Iolaini
- Genus: Stugeta; H. H. Druce, 1891

= Stugeta =

Butterfly genus in family Lycaenidae

Stugeta is an Afrotropical genus of butterflies in the family Lycaenidae. The genus was erected by Hamilton Herbert Druce in 1891.

== Species ==
- Stugeta bowkeri (Trimen, 1864)
- Stugeta carpenteri Stempffer, 1946
- Stugeta marmoreus (Butler, 1866)
- Stugeta mimetica Aurivillius, 1916
- Stugeta occidentalis Stempffer & Bennett, 1958
- Stugeta somalina Stempffer, 1946
- Stugeta subinfuscata Grünberg, 1910
