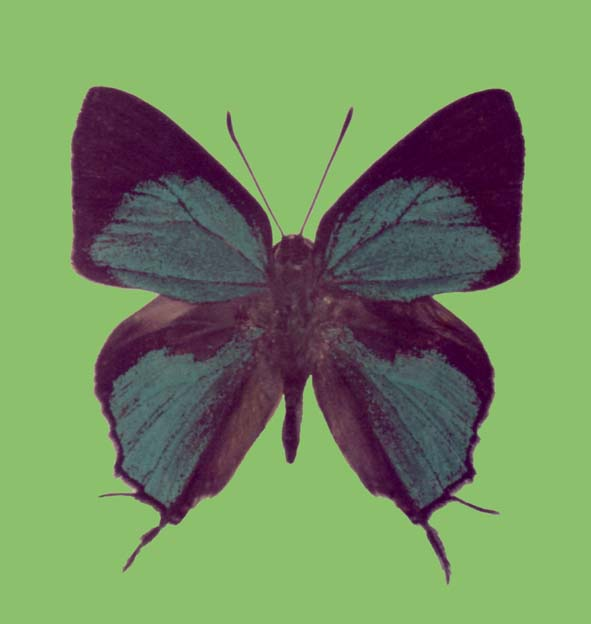
- Male upperside
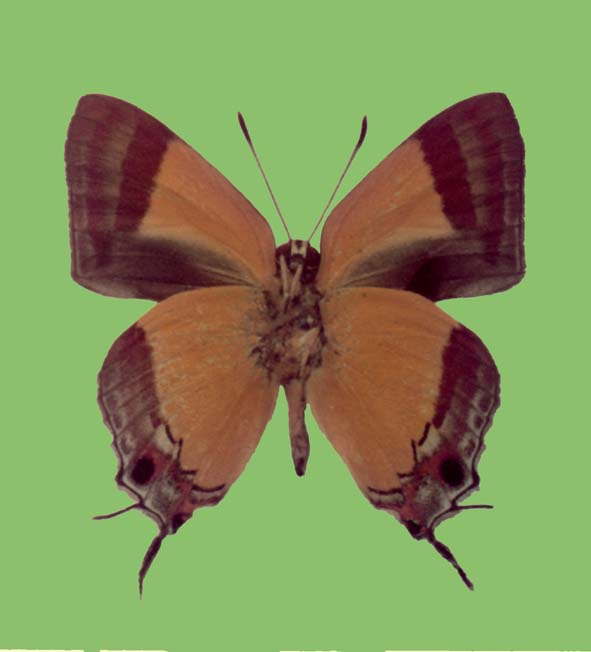
- Male underside

Scientific classification
- Kingdom: Animalia
- Phylum: Arthropoda
- Class: Insecta
- Order: Lepidoptera
- Family: Lycaenidae
- Genus: Paruparo
- Species: P. cebuensis

Binomial name
- Paruparo cebuensis (Jumalon, 1975)

= Paruparo cebuensis =

Species of butterfly

Paruparo cebuensis is a species of butterfly in the family Lycaenidae. It is found in the Philippines.

== Description ==
Its forewing length is 15–18 mm.

== Subspecies and range ==
The nominotypical subspecies cebuensis is distributed on Cebu island. Subspecies treadawayi is distributed on Negros island, ametystina on Homonhon island, soloni on Bohol island, medicieloi on Leyte island, and chotaroi on Mindanao island.
