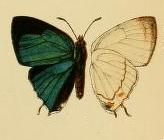

Scientific classification
- Kingdom: Animalia
- Phylum: Arthropoda
- Class: Insecta
- Order: Lepidoptera
- Family: Lycaenidae
- Genus: Etesiolaus
- Species: E. catori

Binomial name
- Etesiolaus catori (Bethune-Baker, 1904)

Synonyms
- Iolaus catori Bethune-Baker, 1904; Iolaus catori cottoni Bethune-Baker, 1908

= Etesiolaus catori =

Species of butterfly

Etesiolaus catori, the small green sapphire or Cator's sapphire, is a butterfly in the family Lycaenidae. It is found in Guinea, Sierra Leone, Liberia, Ivory Coast, Ghana, Nigeria, Cameroon, the Central African Republic, the Democratic Republic of the Congo, Uganda, Kenya, Tanzania and Zambia. The habitat consists of forests.

The larvae feed on Pachystela brevipes, Manilkara and Synsepalum species.

== Subspecies ==
- Etesiolaus catori catori (Guinea, Sierra Leone, Liberia, Ivory Coast, Ghana, Nigeria: south and the Cross River loop, southern Cameroon, Central African Republic, Democratic Republic of the Congo)
- Etesiolaus catori cottoni (Bethune-Baker, 1908) (Democratic Republic of the Congo: Uele and Lualaba, Uganda, western Kenya, western Tanzania at the Kasye and Minziro forests, northwestern Zambia)
