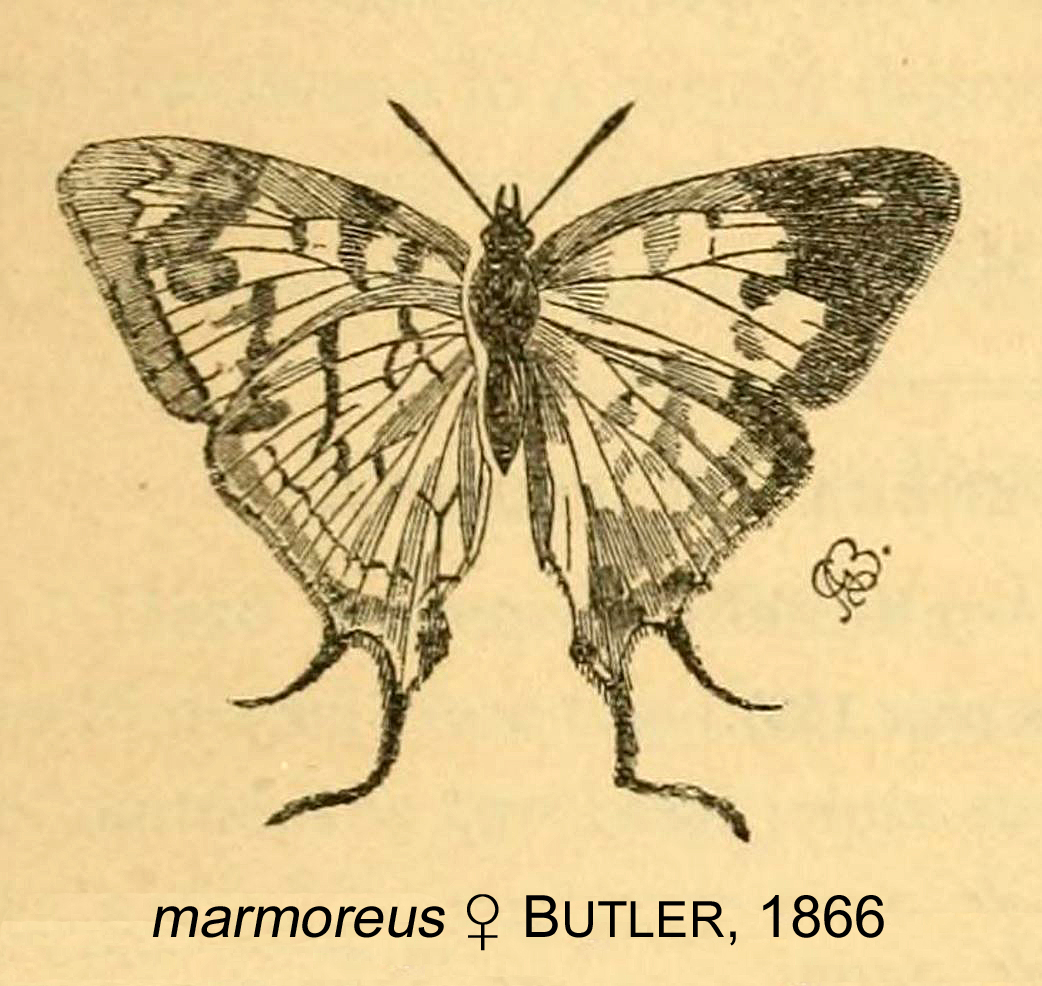
- Female from original description
- In Seitz

Scientific classification
- Kingdom: Animalia
- Phylum: Arthropoda
- Clade: Pancrustacea
- Class: Insecta
- Order: Lepidoptera
- Family: Lycaenidae
- Genus: Stugeta
- Species: S. marmoreus

Binomial name
- Stugeta marmoreus (Butler, 1866)

Synonyms
- Aphnaeus marmoreus Butler, 1866; Stugeta olalae Stoneham, 1934

= Stugeta marmoreus =

Species of butterfly

Stugeta marmoreus, the marbled sapphire, is a butterfly in the family Lycaenidae. It was described by Arthur Gardiner Butler in 1866. It is found in Senegal, Burkina Faso, Guinea, Ivory Coast, Ghana, Nigeria, Sudan, Uganda and Kenya. The habitat consists of Sudan savanna.

Adults of both sexes are attracted to flowers.

The larvae feed on the young leaves of Ximenia americana, Ximenia afra and possibly Loranthus species. They are green with red spots.

== Subspecies ==
- Stugeta marmoreus marmoreus (Senegal, Burkina Faso, northern Guinea, Ivory Coast, Ghana, northern Nigeria, southern Sudan, north-western Uganda)
- Stugeta marmoreus olalae Stoneham, 1934 (Uganda: Elgon area, Kenya: west to the southern and eastern slopes of Mount Elgon)
