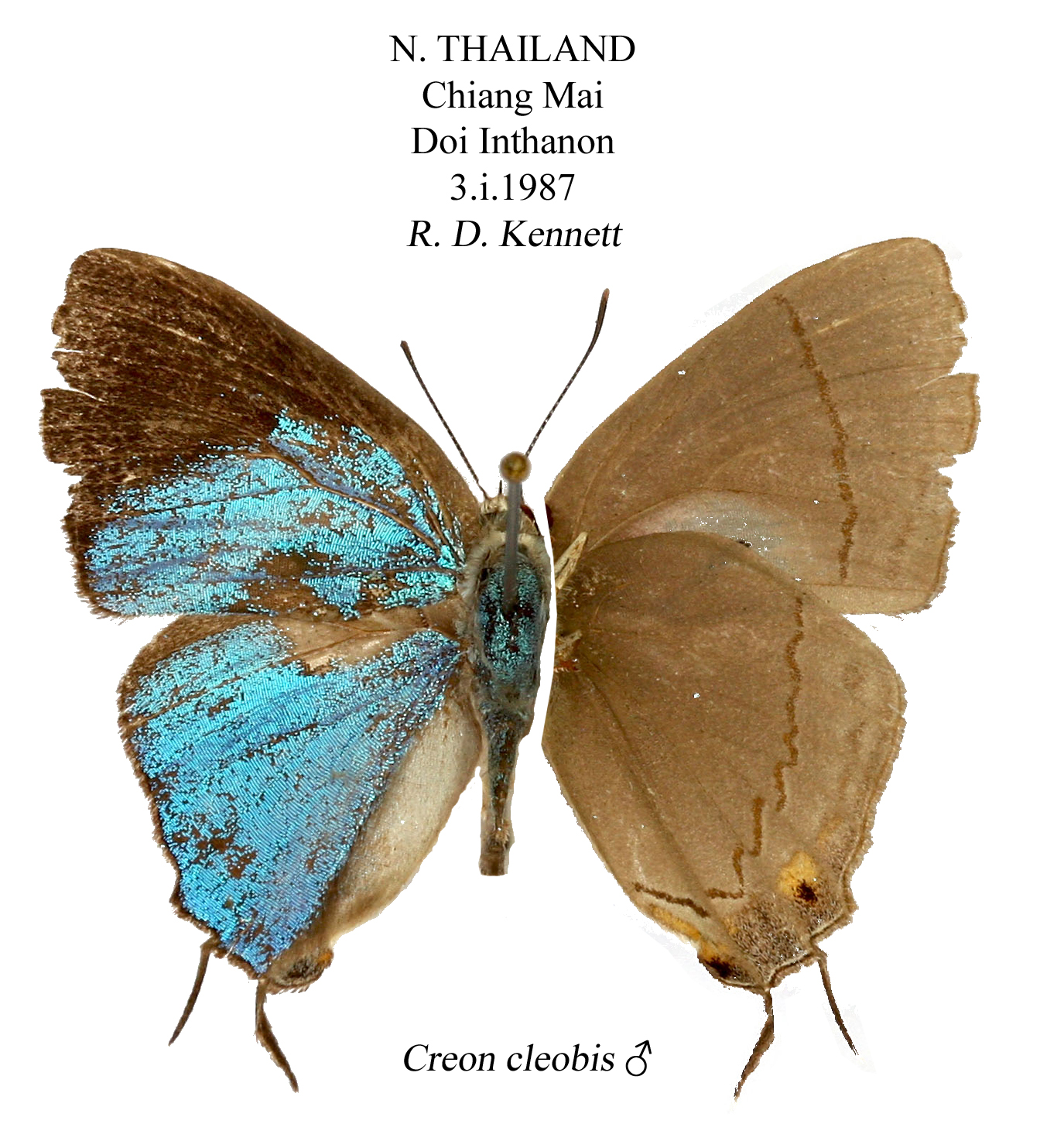

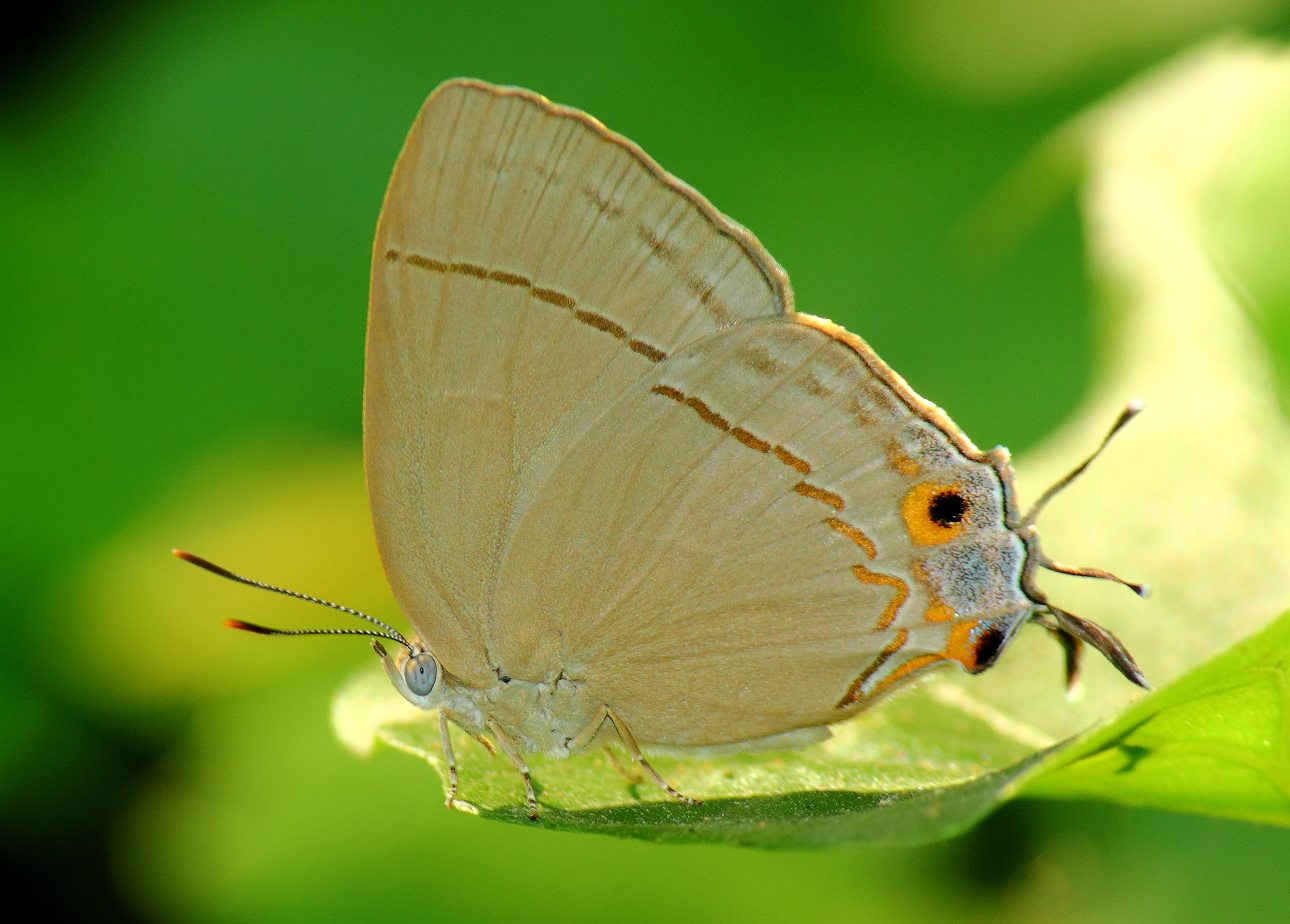

Scientific classification
- Kingdom: Animalia
- Phylum: Arthropoda
- Clade: Pancrustacea
- Class: Insecta
- Order: Lepidoptera
- Family: Lycaenidae
- Subfamily: Theclinae
- Tribe: Iolaini
- Genus: Creon de Nicéville, 1896
- Species: C. cleobis

Binomial name
- Creon cleobis (Godart, 1824)

Synonyms
- Polyommatus cleobis Godart, 1824; Iolaus cleobis Hewitson, 1865; Pratapa cleobis Godart; Camena cleobis

= Broadtail royal =

Monotypic butterfly genus in family Lycaenidae

The broadtail royal (Creon cleobis) is a butterfly in the monotypic genus Creon, in the family Lycaenidae. It is found in South Asia.

== Subspecies ==
- Creon cleobis cleobis Godart, 1824 - South India, West Bengal, Assam - Thailand, Burma and Bangladesh.
- Creon cleobis queda Corbet, 1938 - Peninsular Malaya
- Creon cleobis igolotiana Murayama & Okamura, 1973 Corbet, 1938 - Philippines (Luzon)

== Description ==
Male. Upperside brilliant blue, sometimes dark sky-blue, but varying somewhat in shade of colour. Forewing with more than the apical third and the outer third of the cell black, the remaining short basal portion of the costa narrowly black. the outer margin from vein 2 to the hinder angle with little more than a thick black line. Hindwing with the glandular patch below the costa grey; abdominal fold pale grey, outer marginal line black; anal lobe with a black and an orange spot on its inner side, the rest of the lobe with black and blue scales; tails black, tipped with white. Cilia of both wings black, with white tips on the lower part of the hindwing. Underside creamy-brown, a fine red-brown, somewhat sinuous discal line across both wings, slightly outwardly curved on both wings, becomes angular on the lower part of the hindwing, and turns inwards in a regular curve to the abdominal margin a little above the anal angle; a black spot on the anal lobe, another in the first interspace, both capped with orange, with some blue and grey scales outside and in the interspace between them; marginal line dark brown, with an inner white thread which becomes obsolete upwards. Antennse black, ringed with white, club with a red tip; frons white; eyes ringed with white; head and body brown above, head and thorax with blue pubescence, grey beneath. Female. Upperside pale blue. Forewing with blackish-brown costal band, which broadens at the apex, but not nearly so broad as it is in the male, narrowing on the outer margin, the inner margin of the blackish-brown band nearly evenly curved. Hindwing with the costal space blackish-brown, a series of blackish spots on the outer margin, abdominal fold grey. Underside paler than in the male, markings similar.

— Charles Swinhoe, Lepidoptera Indica. Vol. IX

The wingspan of Creon is 27-38 millimeter.

== Habit ==
Creon flies fast and has a liking for flowers. It can be found near forest streams areas, and comes to damp or wet patches.
