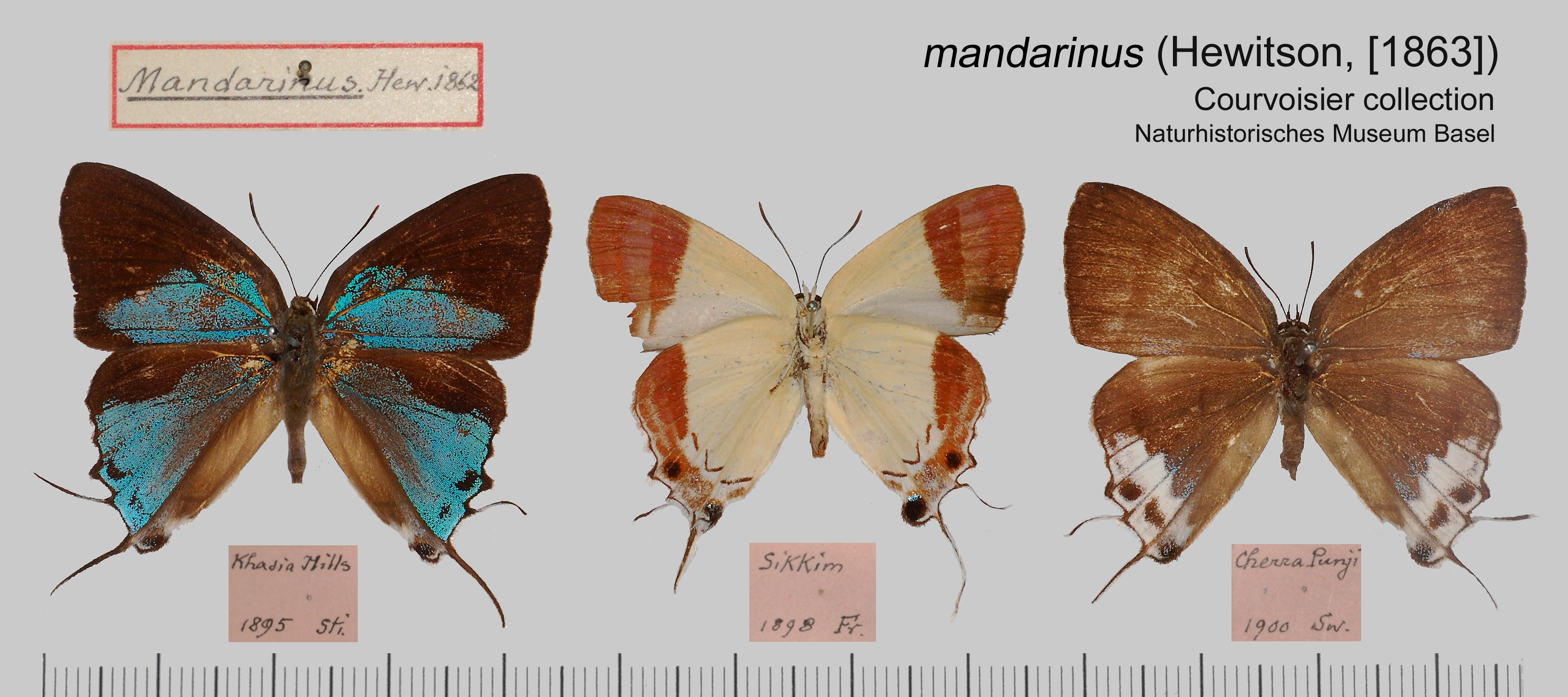

Scientific classification
- Kingdom: Animalia
- Phylum: Arthropoda
- Class: Insecta
- Order: Lepidoptera
- Family: Lycaenidae
- Genus: Charana
- Species: C. mandarinus

Binomial name
- Charana mandarinus (Hewitson, 1863)

Synonyms
- Myrina mandarinus Hewitson, 1863; Tajuria mandarinus; Charana mandarinus splendens

= Charana mandarinus =

Mandarin blue

Species of butterfly

Charana mandarinus, the mandarin blue, is a butterfly in the family Lycaenidae. It is found in the Indomalayan realm.

The larvae feed on Loranthus species.

== Subspecies ==
The following subspecies are recognised:

- Charana mandarinus mandarinus (Sikkim, Bhutan, Assam, Burma, Thailand)
- Charana mandarinus splendida Moulton, 1911 (Borneo, Peninsular Malaya, possibly Sumatra)
