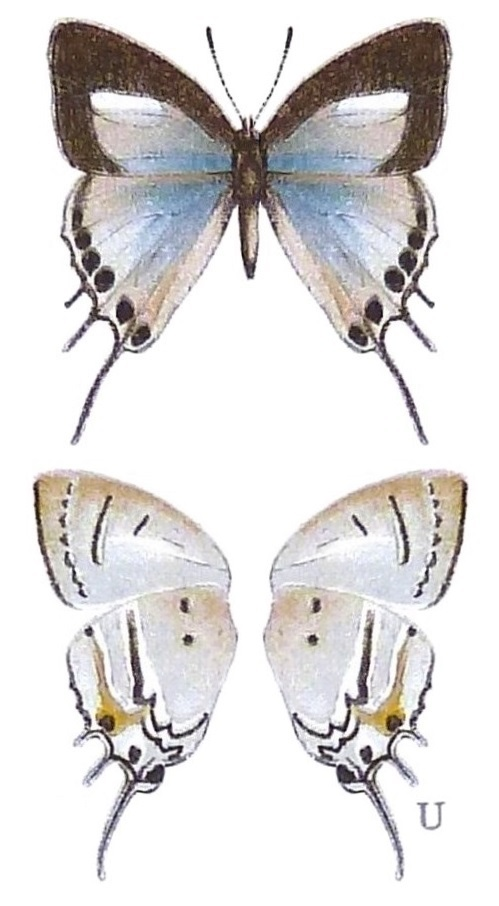
- In Seitz (1925)

Scientific classification
- Kingdom: Animalia
- Phylum: Arthropoda
- Class: Insecta
- Order: Lepidoptera
- Family: Lycaenidae
- Genus: Iolaus
- Species: I. mermeros

Binomial name
- Iolaus mermeros (Mabille, 1878)

Synonyms
- Hypolycaena mermeros Mabille, 1878; Iolaus (Trichiolaus) mermeros

= Iolaus mermeros =

Species of butterfly

Iolaus mermeros is a butterfly in the family Lycaenidae. It is found on Madagascar. The habitat consists of forests.

== Gallery ==
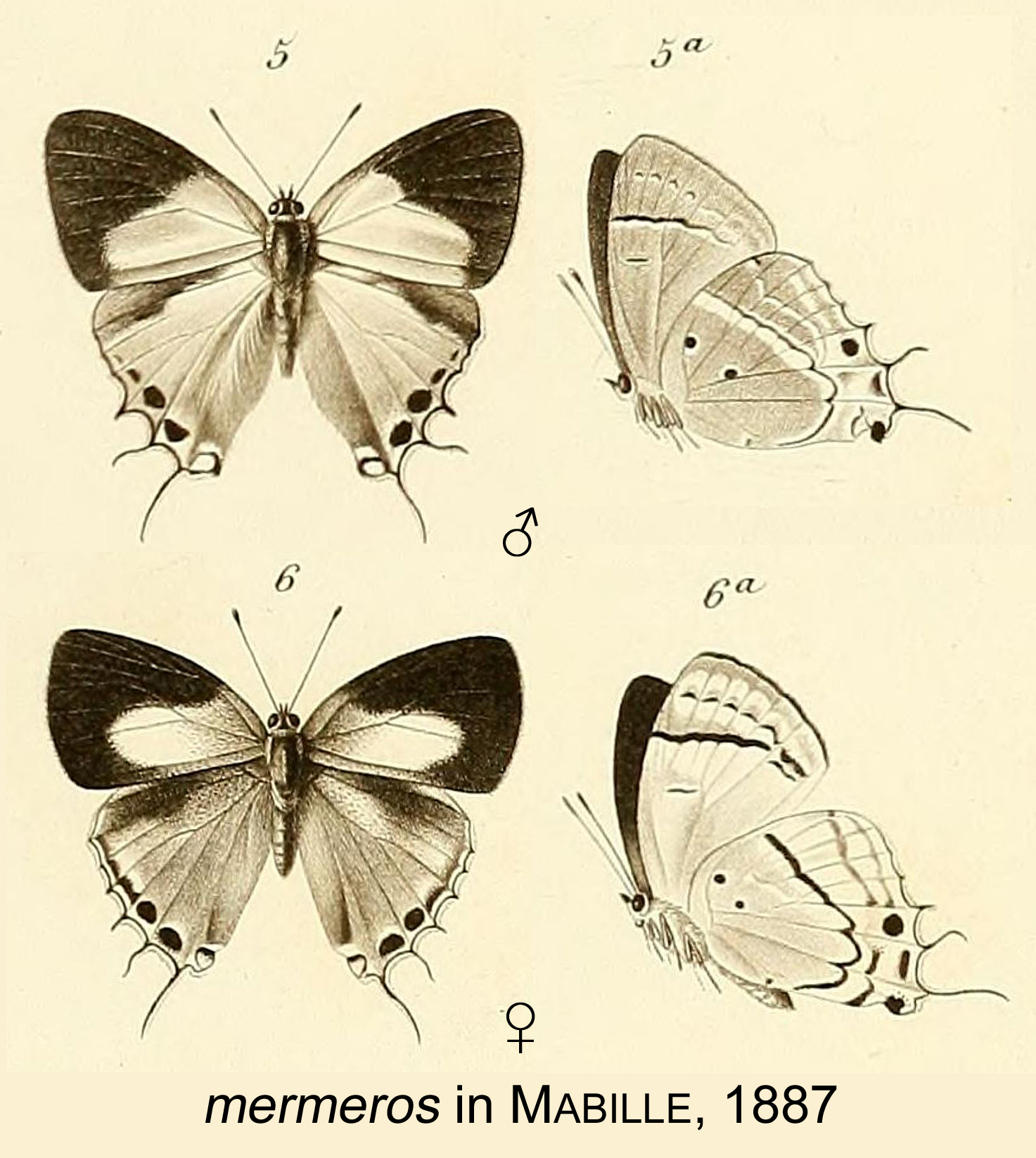
In Mabille (1887)

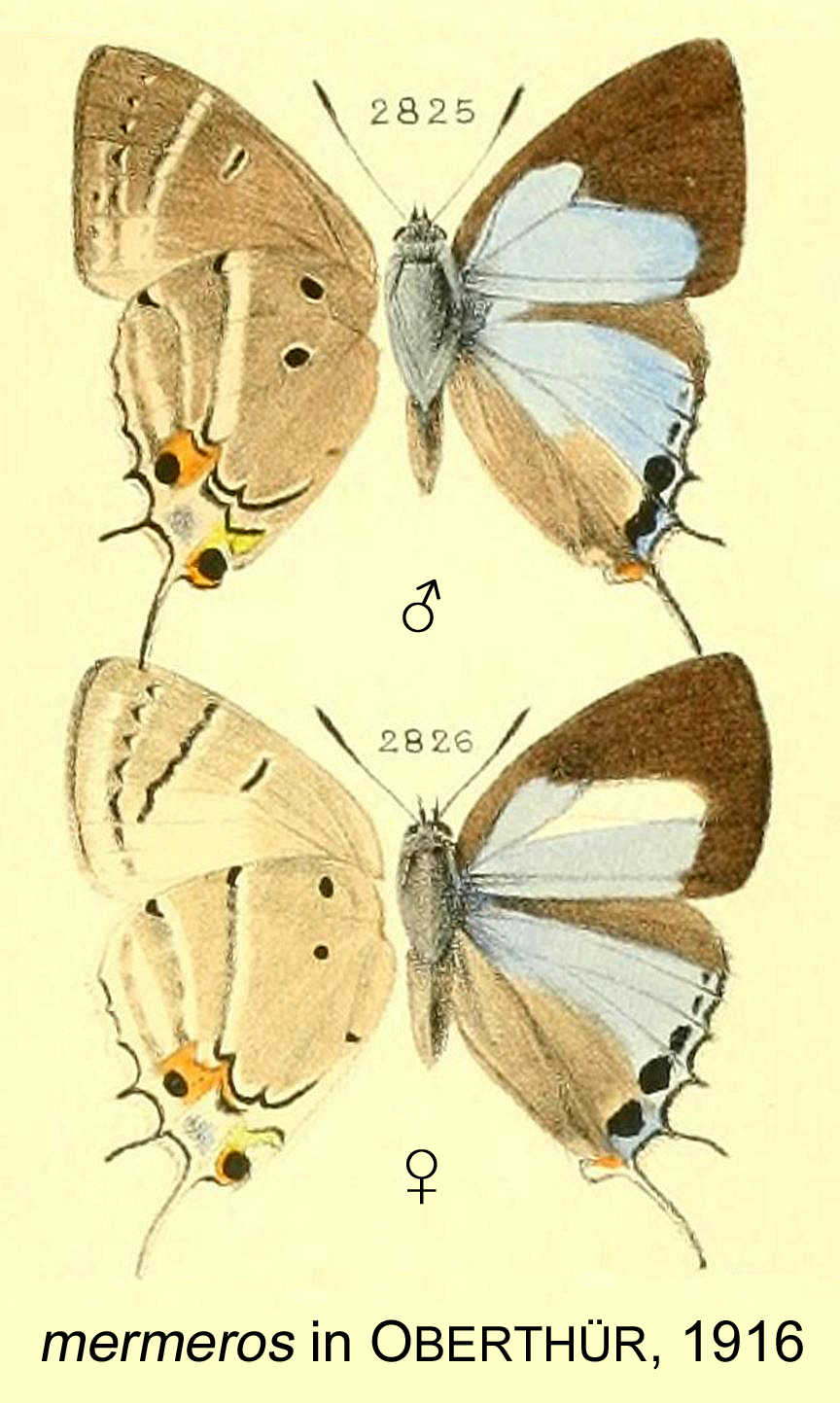
In Oberthuer (1916)
