= Purlisa =

Scientific classification
- Domain: Eukaryota
- Kingdom: Animalia
- Phylum: Arthropoda
- Class: Insecta
- Order: Lepidoptera
- Family: Lycaenidae
- Genus: Purlisa; Distant, 1881
- Species: P. giganteus

Binomial name
- Purlisa giganteus Distant, 1881

Monotypic butterfly genus in family Lycaenidae

Purlisa is a butterfly genus in the family Lycaenidae. It is monotypic, containing only the species Pulisa giganteus. It is known from Malaysia.

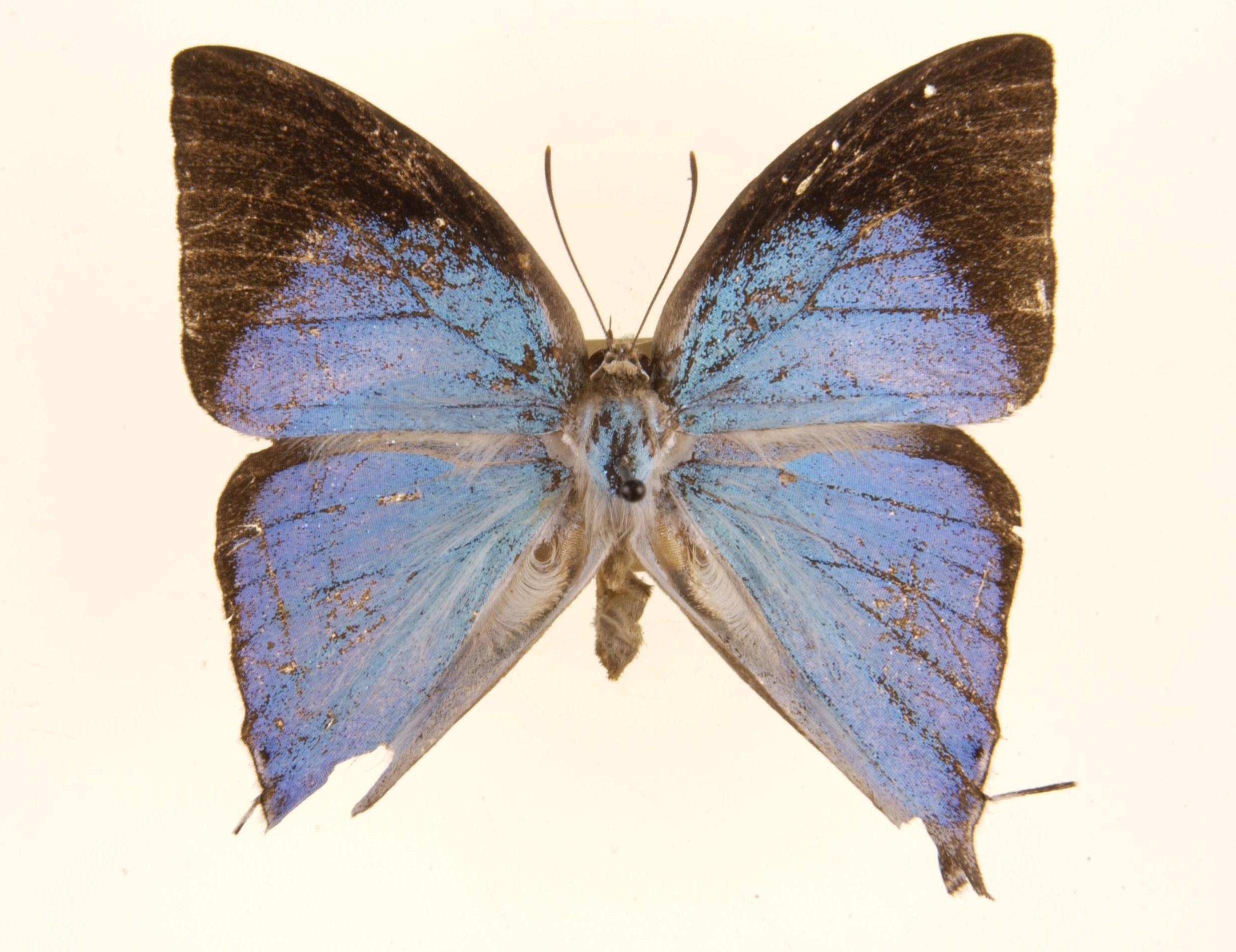
Specimen of Pulisa giganteus from Malaya
