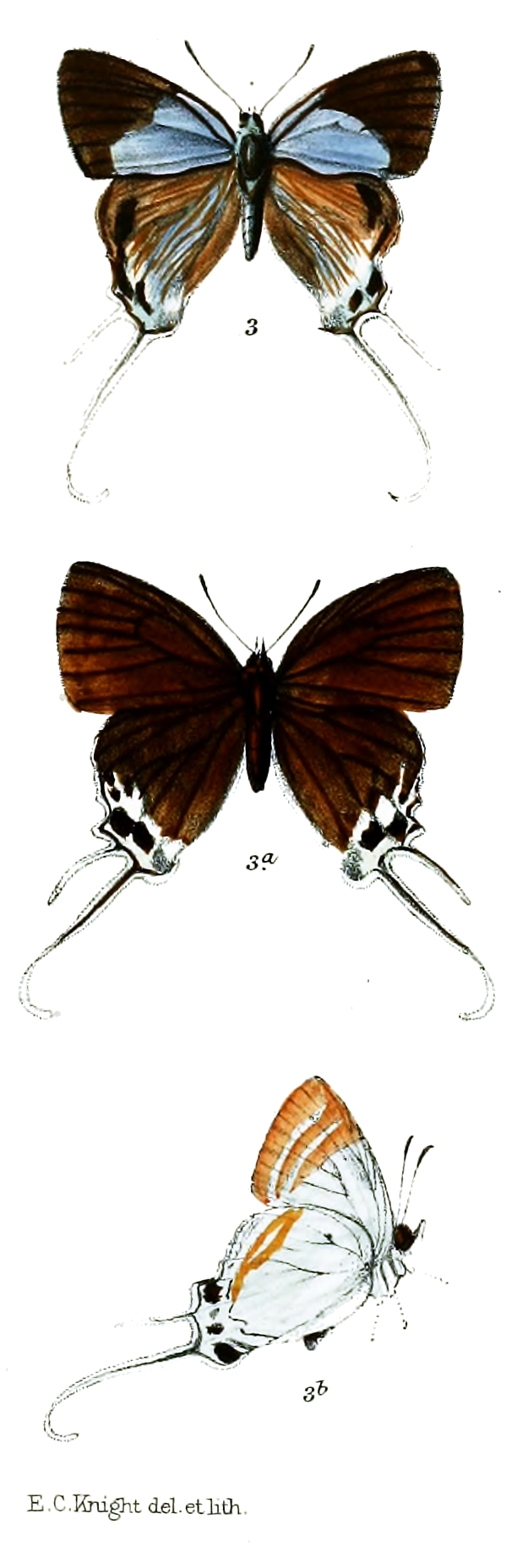
- From top: male, female and male underside

Scientific classification
- Kingdom: Animalia
- Phylum: Arthropoda
- Clade: Pancrustacea
- Class: Insecta
- Order: Lepidoptera
- Family: Lycaenidae
- Genus: Jacoona
- Species: J. fabronia

Binomial name
- Jacoona fabronia (Hewitson 1878)

= Jacoona fabronia =

Pale grand imperial

Species of butterfly

Jacoona fabronia, commonly known as the pale grand imperial, is a small species of butterfly in the blues family Lycaenidae. It is found in India.

== Subspecies ==
There are two subspecies recognised:

- J. fabronia fabronia (Hewitson 1878)
- J. fabronia lina Eliot, 1959

== See also ==
- List of butterflies of India (Lycaenidae)
