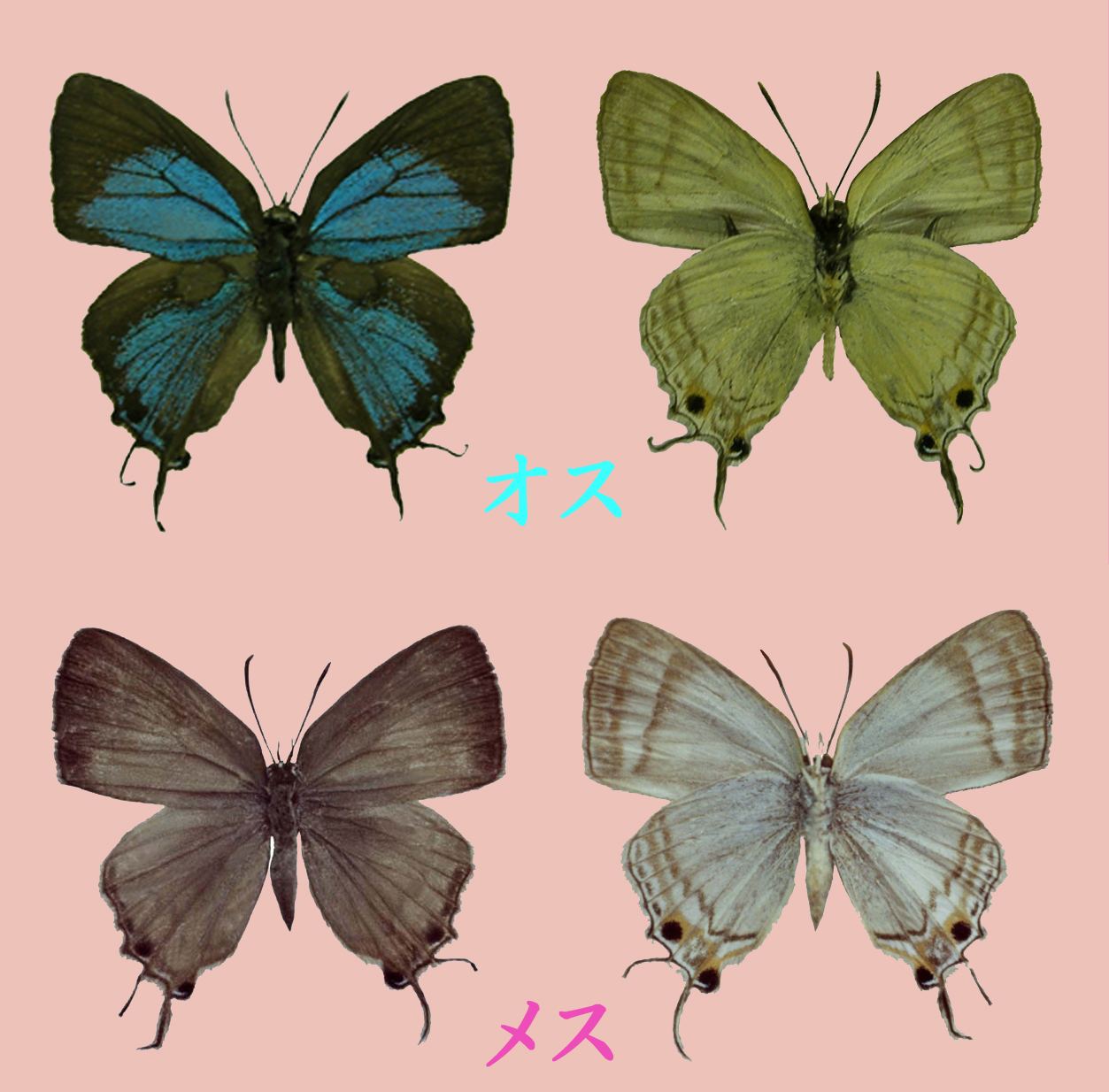
- Paruparo mio

Scientific classification
- Kingdom: Animalia
- Phylum: Arthropoda
- Class: Insecta
- Order: Lepidoptera
- Family: Lycaenidae
- Subfamily: Theclinae
- Genus: Paruparo; Takanami, 1982

= Paruparo =

Butterfly genus in family Lycaenidae

Paruparo is a genus of butterflies in the family Lycaenidae. The species of this genus are found in the Indomalayan realm.

== Species ==
- Paruparo annie Takanami, 1982 Philippines, Luzon
- Paruparo arbaimuni Takanami & Seki, 1990 Indonesia, Sumatra
- Paruparo cebuensis (Jumalon, 1975)
- Paruparo kuehni (Röber, 1887)
- Paruparo lumawigi (Schröder, 1976) Philippines, Marinduque
- Paruparo mamertina (Hewitson, 1869)
- Paruparo mio Hayashi, Schröder & Treadaway, 1984
- Paruparo rosemarie Seki, 1993 Philippines, Leyte
- Paruparo violacea (Schröder & Treadaway, 1978) Philippines, Mindanao
