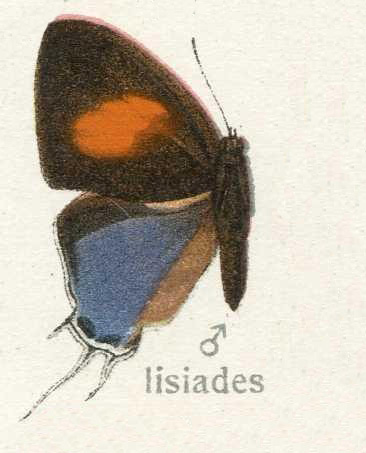
- Male, upperside
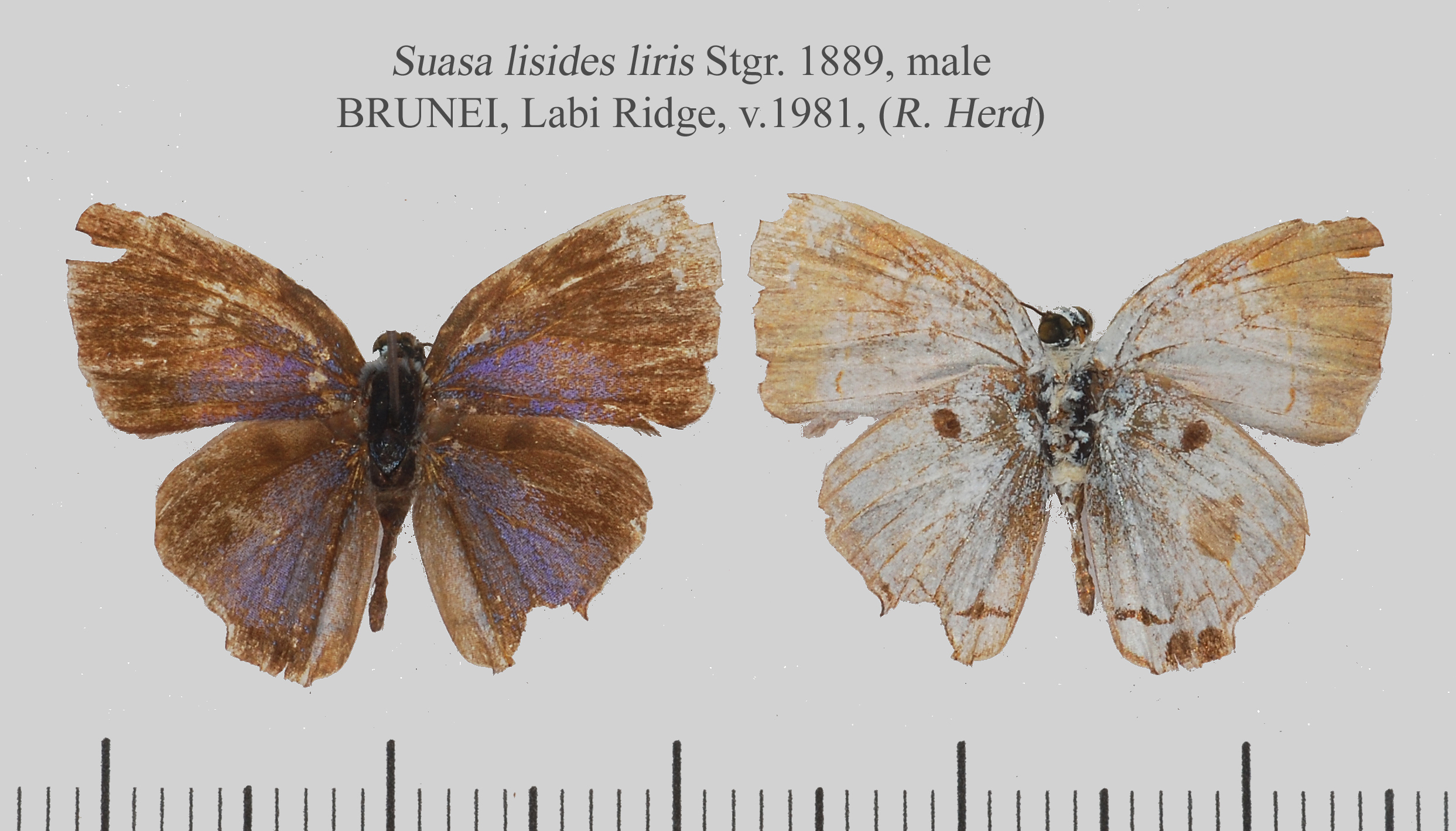
- S. lisides liris Staudinger (Palawan)

Scientific classification
- Kingdom: Animalia
- Phylum: Arthropoda
- Class: Insecta
- Order: Lepidoptera
- Family: Lycaenidae
- Genus: Suasa de Nicéville, 1890
- Species: S. lisides

Binomial name
- Suasa lisides (Hewitson 1863)

= Suasa (butterfly) =

Red imperial

Monotypic butterfly genus in family Lycaenidae

Suasa is a monotypic butterfly genus in the family Lycaenidae erected by Lionel de Nicéville in 1890. Its only species, Suasa lisides, the red imperial, was first described by William Chapman Hewitson in 1863. It is a small butterfly first known from India. The species is widespread in Southeast Asia, from Assam to Vietnam (ssp.madaura Fruhstorfer, 1912) Palawan (ssp.liris (Staudinger, 1889) and in Peninsula Malaya, Borneo and Sumatra (ssp.suessa de Nicéville, [1893]).

== See also ==
- List of butterflies of India (Lycaenidae)
