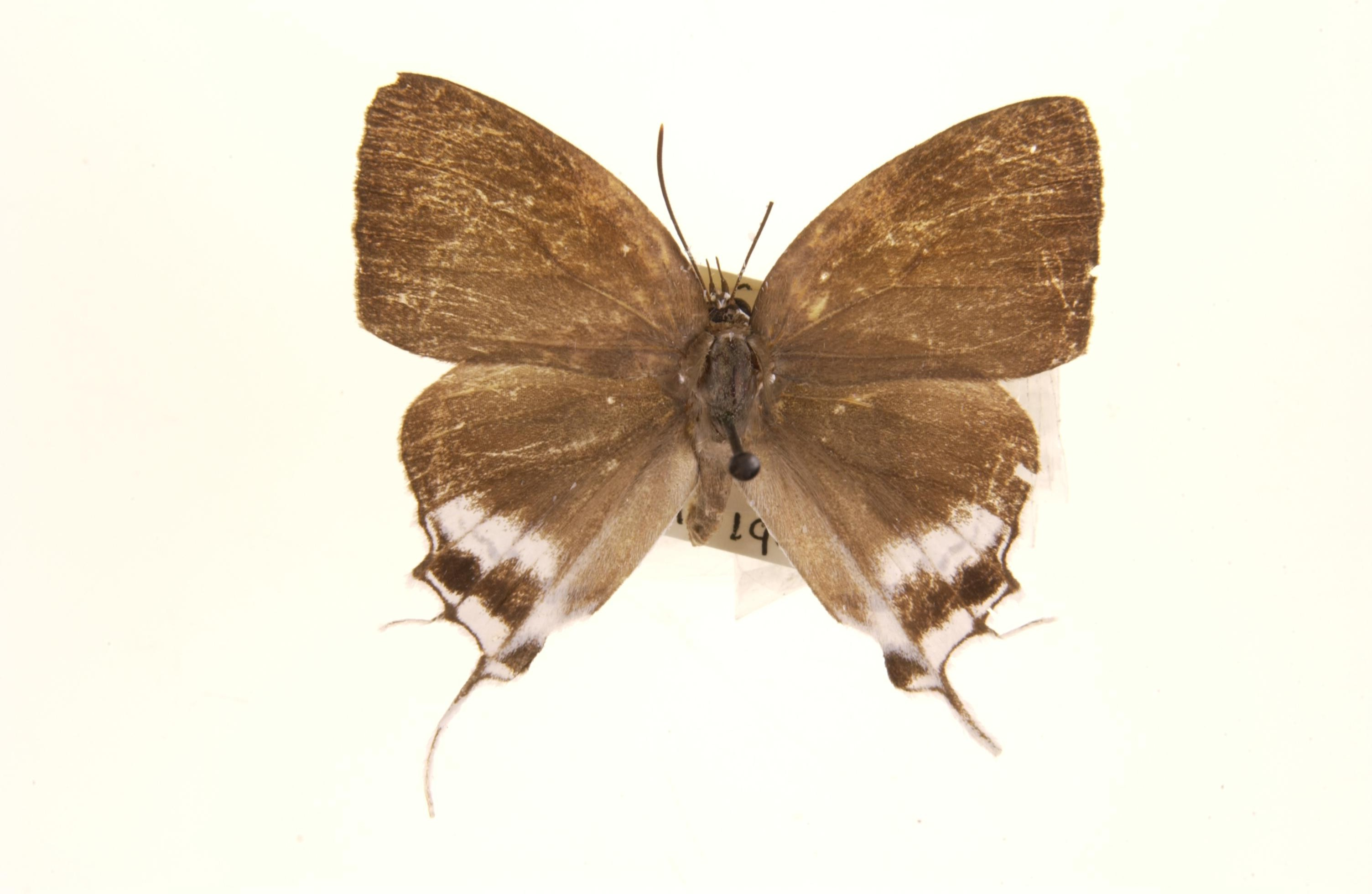
- Manto hypoleuca
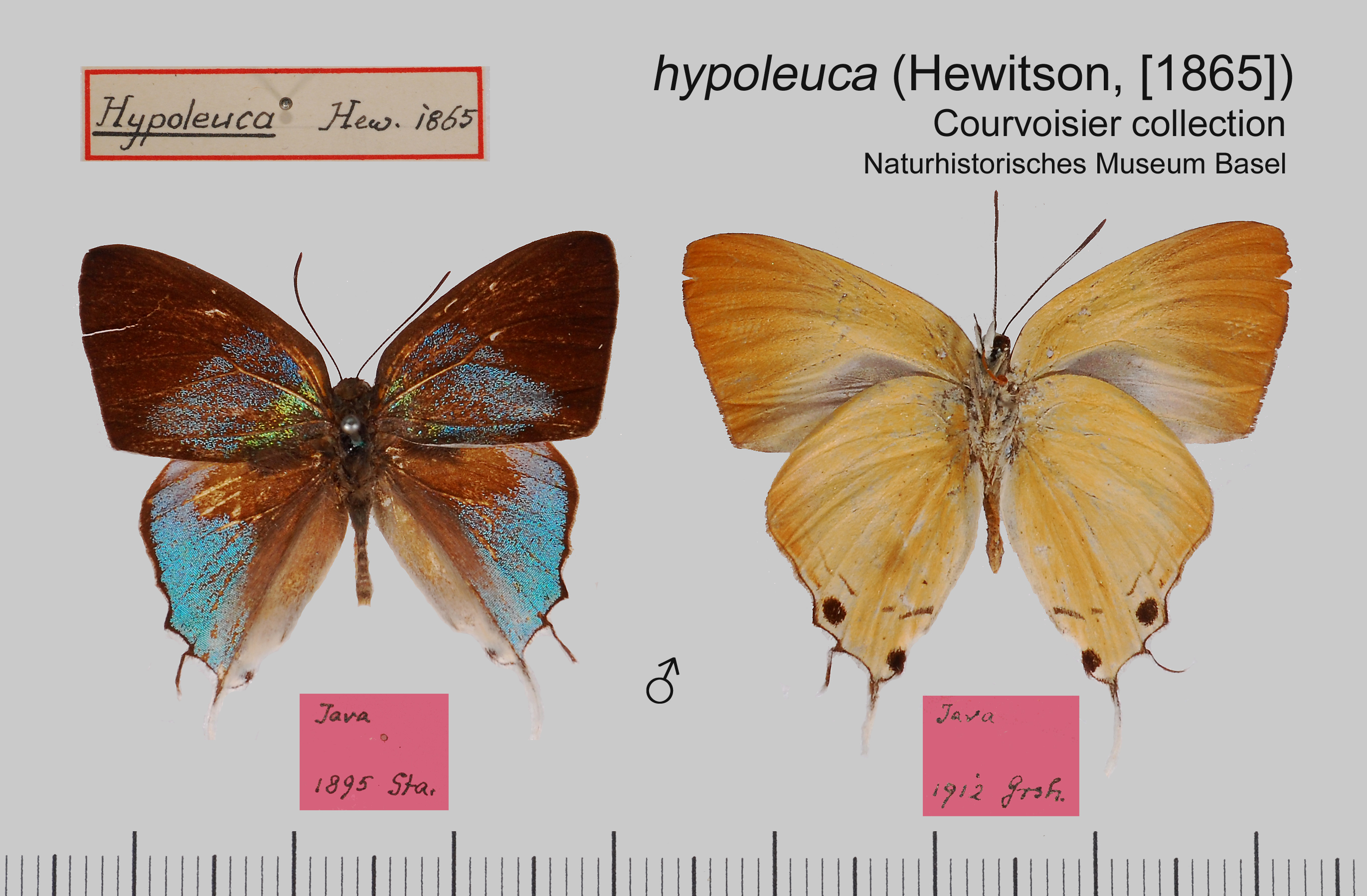
- Manto hypoleuca male Courvoisier Collection, Basel

Scientific classification
- Kingdom: Animalia
- Phylum: Arthropoda
- Class: Insecta
- Order: Lepidoptera
- Family: Lycaenidae
- Subfamily: Theclinae
- Tribe: Iolaini
- Genus: Manto de Nicéville, 1895
- Species: M. hypoleuca

Binomial name
- Manto hypoleuca (Hewitson, 1865)

= Manto hypoleuca =

Species of butterfly

Manto is a monotypic genus of butterflies in the family Lycaenidae. Its sole species, Manto hypoleuca, is found in the Indomalayan realm.

== Subspecies ==
- M. h. hypoleuca Java
- M. h. martina (Hewitson, 1869) Palawan
- M. h. inopinata (Butler, 1883) Nias
