= Emelianthe =

Scientific classification
- Kingdom: Plantae
- Clade: Tracheophytes
- Clade: Angiosperms
- Clade: Eudicots
- Order: Santalales
- Family: Loranthaceae
- Genus: Emelianthe; Danser
- Species: E. panganensis

Binomial name
- Emelianthe panganensis (Engl.) Danser

Synonyms
- Loranthus panganensis Engl.

Genus of plants

Emelianthe is a monotypic genus of flowering plants belonging to the family Loranthaceae. The only species is Emelianthe panganensis.

Its native range is Northeastern and Eastern Tropical Africa.
