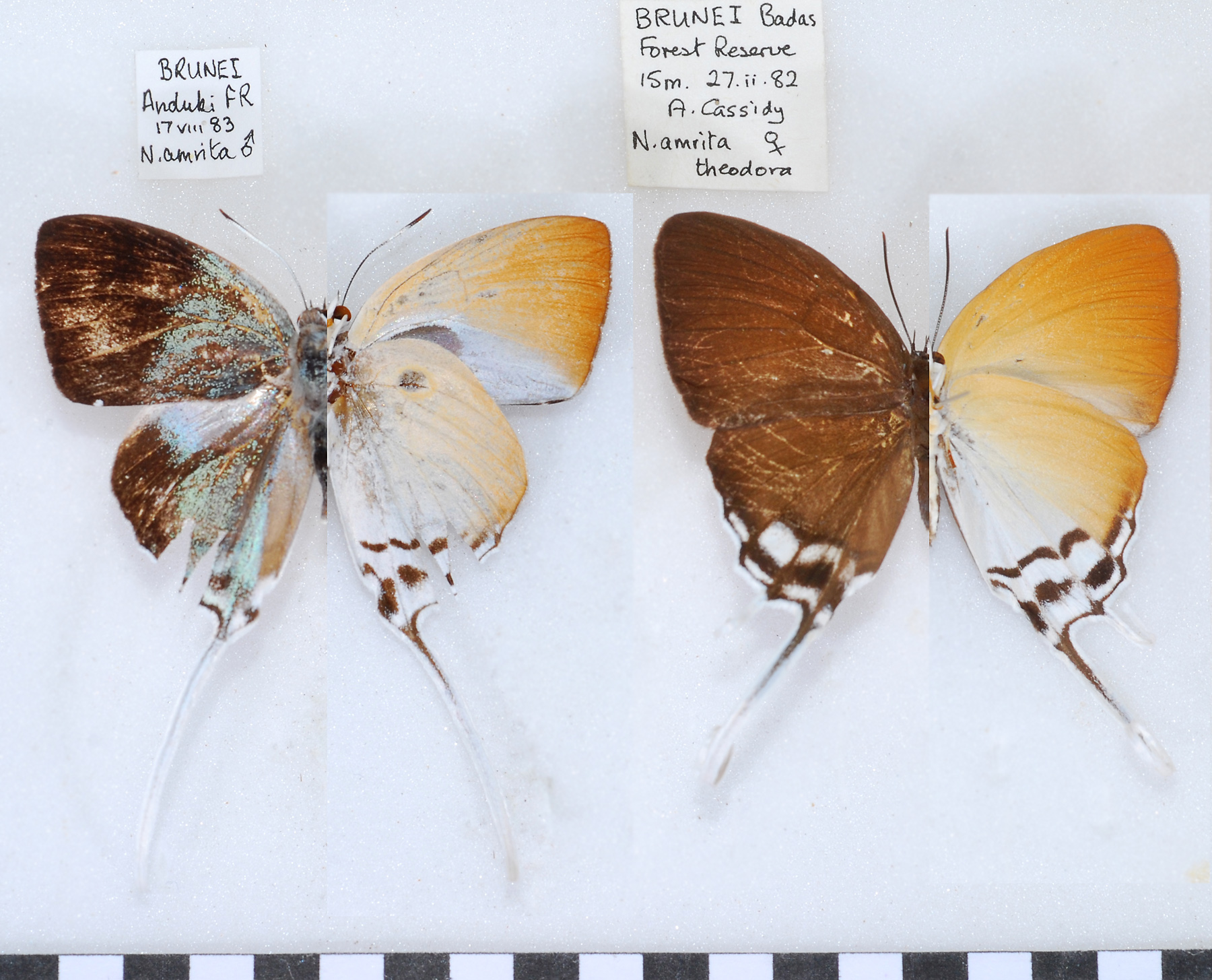
- N. t. theodora male and female From the Courvoisier Collection, Basel, Switzerland

Scientific classification
- Kingdom: Animalia
- Phylum: Arthropoda
- Clade: Pancrustacea
- Class: Insecta
- Order: Lepidoptera
- Family: Lycaenidae
- Genus: Neocheritra
- Species: N. amrita

Binomial name
- Neocheritra amrita (C. Felder & R. Felder, 1860)

Synonyms
- Myrina amrita C. & R. Felder, 1860; Neocheritra megalesia Fruhstorfer, 1912; Neocheritra amrita paulina Riley, 1932; Neocheritra theodora Druce, 1885; Neocheritra amrita theodora Druce; Seki, 1991

= Neocheritra amrita =

Species of butterfly

Neocheritra amrita, the grand imperial, is a butterfly in the family Lycaenidae. It is found in Burma, Thailand, Peninsular Malaysia, Singapore and on Sumatra and Borneo.

== Subspecies ==
The following subspecies are recognised:

- Neocheritra amrita amrita (southern Burma, Thailand, Peninsular Malaya, Singapore, Sumatra)
- Neocheritra theodora theodora Druce, 1885 (Borneo)
