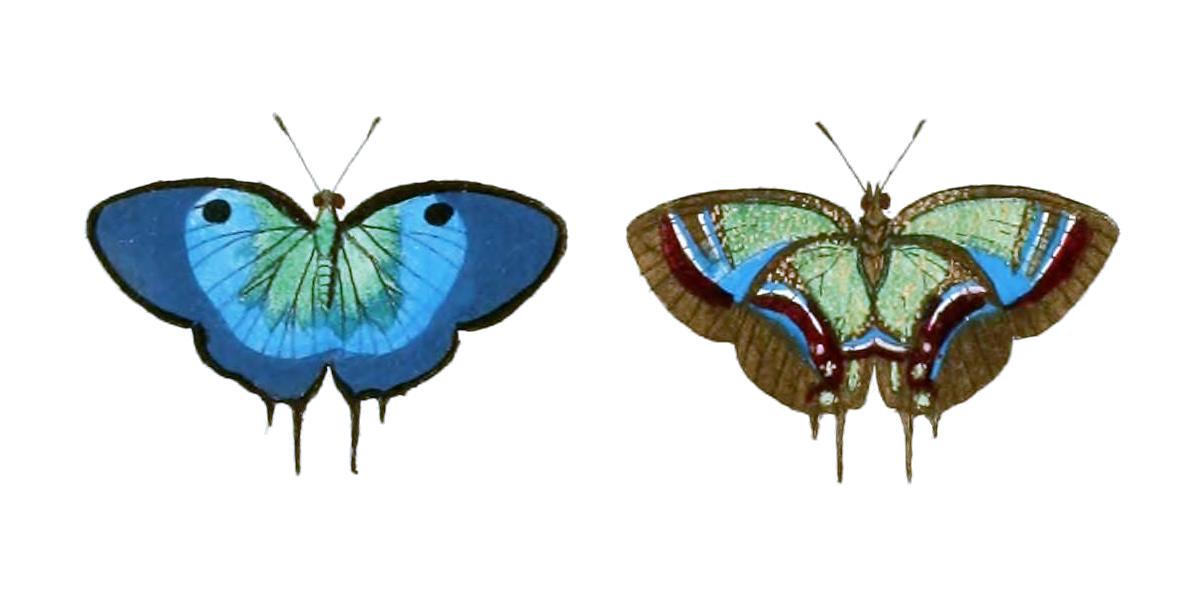
- Lamasina ganimedes type specimen from above (left) and below

Scientific classification
- Kingdom: Animalia
- Phylum: Arthropoda
- Clade: Pancrustacea
- Class: Insecta
- Order: Lepidoptera
- Family: Lycaenidae
- Subfamily: Theclinae
- Tribe: Eumaeini
- Genus: Lamasina; Robbins, 2002

Species
- 3-5, but see text

Synonyms
- Annamaria D'Abrera & Bálint, 2001 (may be nomen nudum); Eucharia Boisduval, 1870 (non Hübner, [1820]: preoccupied)

= Lamasina =

Butterfly genus in family Lycaenidae

Lamasina is a genus of gossamer-winged butterflies (family Lycaenidae); the validity of its name is subject to dispute. Among its family, these sexually dimorphic Lepidoptera belong to the tribe Eumaeini of the subfamily Theclinae. Lamasina species are found mainly in northern South America, approximately to the Guyanas. L. draudti is also found in Central America south of the Yucatán Peninsula. In the Andes, the genus extends somewhat further south; L. rhaptissima almost reaches Bolivia.

The genus name has changed two times since the year 2000 for technical reasons. The question of which name is correct is not yet fully resolved, though Lamasina seems to be preferred.

== Description ==
They show some similarity to Evenus (probably a close relative) and Paiwarria (probably a slightly more distinct member of the Eumaeini). But whether Lamasina is in fact a close relative of the former is not thoroughly studied. The upperwings of Lamasina males and females are bluish, with broad black margins which are broader in females. The underwings are greenish to brown, with a striped or mottled pattern that distinguishes males from females. In some, the males have blue forewing undersides also.

Lamasina has a fairly short forewing cell, measuring less than one-half of the costal length and in males only about one-third. In some Lamasina males, androconia ("perfume" scales) form a characteristic orange or darkened patch on the dorsal forewing. There is a lobed tail at the hindwing tornus in some species. Together with the structure of the genitalia, members of this genus can thus be unequivocally recognized by this combination of characters, though most of these features are also found in other Eumaeini.

== Classification ==
The genus used to be known as Eucharia, established by Jean Baptiste Boisduval in 1870, but that name had earlier been proposed for a genus of arctiid moths. The first attempt to establish a replacement name may have failed on technical grounds; the name chosen, Annamaria, was subsequently argued to be a nomen nudum per Article 13.1 of the ICZN Code, because an appropriate genus description was not given. Lamasina was validly established in 2002, but if "Annamaria" is valid after all, Lamasina is its junior synonym. The matter has been submitted to the ICZN for discussion.

=== Species ===
Three to five species are currently accepted as valid. While L. saphonota might not belong into this genus (it was placed variously in Brevianta and Denivia in the past), L. ganimedes and L. rhaptissima might be cryptic species complexes.

- Lamasina columbia (Bálint, 2005) (may belong in L. rhaptissima)
- Lamasina draudti (Lathy, 1926)
- Lamasina ganimedes (Cramer, 1775) (often misspelled ganymedes, including L. lathyi)
- Lamasina rhaptissima (K.Johnson, 1991) (including L. rhapsodia)
- Lamasina saphonota (Constantino, Salazar & K.Johnson, 1993) (tentatively placed here)

== See also ==
- Airamanna
