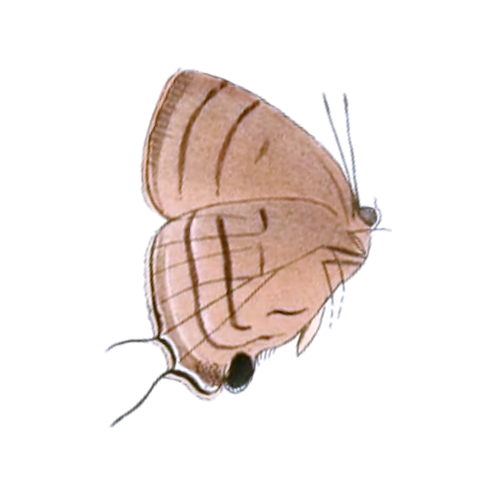
- Female imago of T. mavors (type species) from Amazonia, underwing pattern

Scientific classification
- Kingdom: Animalia
- Phylum: Arthropoda
- Clade: Pancrustacea
- Class: Insecta
- Order: Lepidoptera
- Family: Lycaenidae
- Subfamily: Theclinae
- Tribe: Eumaeini
- Genus: Theritas; Hübner, 1818

Type species
- Theritas mavors Hübner, 1818

Species
- 5 to about 30, see text

Synonyms
- Aveexcrenota Salazar & K.Johnson, 1997; Denivia K.Johnson, 1992; Lucilda D'Abrera & Bálint, 2001 (may be nomen nudum); Margaritheclus Bálint, 2002 (but see text)

= Theritas =

Butterfly genus in family Lycaenidae

Theritas is a genus of gossamer-winged butterflies (family Lycaenidae) found in the Neotropics. Among the tribe Eumaeini of its subfamily Theclinae, it is usually placed in the group around the genus Atlides. In particular, it seems most closely related to Arcas.

== Description ==
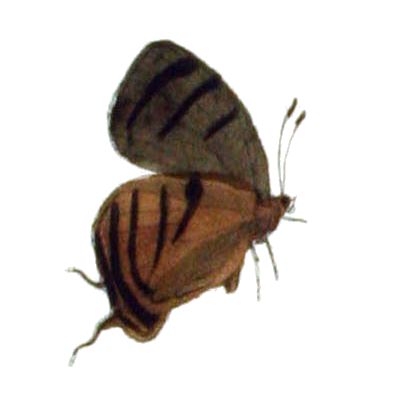
Underwing of T. paupera imago

Theritas species are large among the Eumaeini but altogether still smallish butterflies. They typically have a pennant-like hindwing "tail" which projects outwards at an approximate right angle from the squared-off edge of the tapered tornal area. A smaller tail is located slightly more forward on the hindwing. The upperwings of these butterflies are largely or entirely colored brilliant blue. But these traits – as opposed to the androconia pouches discussed below – are also found in several other Eumaeini, which have been included in this genus but do not really appear to belong here.

Like Arcas, they have androconia (scent scales) on the hindwing upperside near the base of the cubital vein; these are autapomorphically tucked away in a flat deep pouch in space 1b between the wing veins. Some species also have androconia on the forewings, but it needs to be clarified whether these are indeed Theritas sensu stricto. The hindwing underside is brownish in these butterflies, with a subbasal line running between the subcosta and the anal vein branch of the cubital vein. This genus has some sexual dichromatism in that the males show green iridescence of the blue upperwing color. By comparison, Arcas has golden-green hindwing undersides dusted with black, with a black band running roughly parallel to the distal wing margin, longer tails, and lacks sexual dichromatism. The female genitals have a long, straight and tubular genital duct with a plain anal end in the type species T. mavors, but variation within the genus is insufficiently studied.

== Species ==
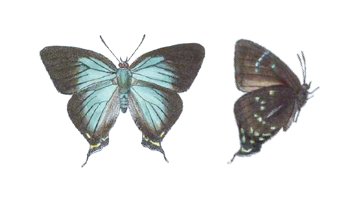
T. augustula male imagines, upperside (left) and underwing

There have been 2 major competing taxonomic schemes for this genus in the late 20th century. The traditional view delimits the genus loosely, with about 30 species. A more recent proposal restricts the genus to 6-8 valid species, which all possess the typical apomorphies and can be divided into three species groups or superspecies:

mavors group

- Theritas kalikimaka (Clench, 1944) (sometimes included in T. mavors)
- Theritas lotis (Goodson, 1945) (sometimes included in T. mavors)
- Theritas mavors Hübner, 1818

paupera group

- Theritas drucei (Lathy, 1926)
- Theritas gozmanyi (Bálint, Wojtusiak, Kerstész & Biró, 2007)
- Theritas harrietta (Weeks, 1901)
- Theritas paupera (C. Felder & R. Felder, 1865)

triquetra group

- Theritas triquetra (Hewitson, 1865)

In 2019, phylogenetic research (Martins 2019) was published that reclassified Theritas as a small, widespread Neotropical genus containing these five species:

- Theritas mavors Hübner, 1818 - Mexico to central Brazil
- Theritas triquetra (Hewitson, 1865) - Brazil Atlantic region
- Theritas paupera (C. Felder & R. Felder, 1865) - Venezuela to southern Peru
- Theritas harrietta (A.G. Weeks, 1901) - southern Peru to Bolivia
- Theritas drucei (Lathy, 1926) - Brazil

This research included seven genera of the Atlides Section of the tribe Eumaeini: Arcas, Atlides, Brangas, Denivia, Lucilda, Pseudolycaena, and Theritas. Additionally, the genera Margaritheclus and Dabreras were classified as synonyms of Lucilda and Brangas.

=== Provisionally placed here ===
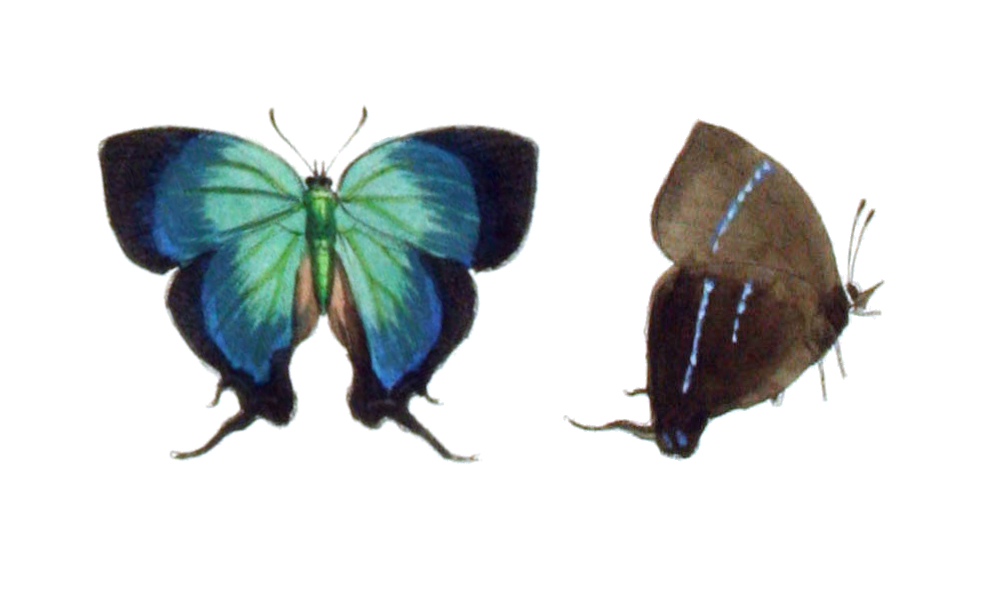
Male imagines, upperside (left) and underwing, of T. danaus, which has been proposed for separation in Margaritheclus

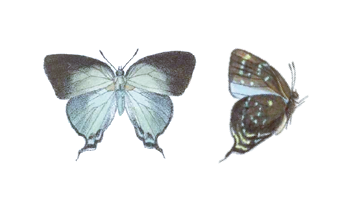
T. theocritus male imagines, upperside (left) and underwing

A number of species are usually placed in Theritas, but apparently will have to be split off if the genus is to be a monophyletic group. "T." anna for example might be closer to Brangas and Evenus or even belong in the latter, while "T." deniva and some allies could just as well be closer to Micandra and Penaincisalia than to Theritas proper. All in all, it is not unlikely that some of the genera nowadays considered junior synonyms of Theritas turn out to be valid. Several of the proposed genera are monotypic, and thus perhaps least likely to be valid. One of these has been argued to be nomen nudum per Article 13.1 of the ICZN Code, because an appropriate genus description was not given; the matter has been submitted to the ICZN for discussion. That all nonwithstanding, species provisionally placed in Theritas are:

- Theritas acontius (Goodson, 1945)
- Theritas adamsi (Druce, 1909) (close to "T." deniva?)
- Theritas anna (Druce, 1907) (type species of Aveexcrenota; including A. mimianna)
- Theritas arene (Goodson, 1945)
- Theritas augustinula (Goodson, 1845)
- Theritas augustula (Kirby, 1877)
- Theritas boliboyeri (Bálint & Wojtusiak, 2006) (later Lucilda boliboyerus (Bálint & Wojtusiak, 2006) per Martins et al. 2019.
- Theritas chalumna (Schaus, 1902)
- Theritas crines (Druce, 1907) (type species of "Lucilda")
- Theritas curitibaensis (Johnson, 1992)
- Theritas danaus (C. & R.Felder, [1865]) (type species of Margaritheclus)
- Theritas deniva (Hewitson, 1874) (type species of Denivia)
- Theritas hemon (Cramer, [1775]) (close to "T." deniva?)
- Theritas lisus (Stoll, 1790)
- Theritas margaritacea (Draudt, 1919)
- Theritas monica (Hewitson, 1867)
- Theritas phegeus (Hewitson, 1865)
- Theritas theocritus (Fabricius, 1793)
- Theritas viresco (Druce, 1907)

In addition, there are at least three more undescribed species placed here: one from Santa Catarina state in Brazil and two from the Andes of Peru. It is unknown whether they are indeed Theritas sensu stricto. T. drucei and T. triquetra as well as some species of the disputed assemblage are known from Santa Catarina or its surroundings, while the rest of the paupera group but also many other related Lycaenidae are found in the Andes.
