= Arka =

Arka may refer to:

== Places ==
- Arka, Hungary, a village in Borsod-Abaúj-Zemplén county, Hungary
- Arka, Iran, village in Mazandaran Province, Iran
- Arka (monument), a monument in Klaipėda, Lithuania

== Sports ==
- Arka Gdynia, Polish football club, based in Gdynia, Poland
- RC Arka Gdynia, Polish rugby union club based in Gdynia, Poland

== Entertainment ==
- Arka Media Works, Indian film production company
- Arka Sıradakiler, Turkish teen drama series on "Fox Turkey"
- Arka Sokaklar, television crime series on Turkish "Kanal D"

== Other uses ==
- Arka Keshari Deo, Indian politician
- Arka Noego, a war pinnace in the Polish-Lithuanian Commonwealth Navy that played an important role in two naval battles of the Polish–Swedish War (1626–1629)
- Alternate name for Surya, the sun god in Hindu religion
- One of a pair of Andean panpipes siku

== See also ==
- Arkas (disambiguation)
- Arca (disambiguation)
- Arqa, a village in Lebanon
