= Arca =

ARCA or Arca may refer to:

== Companies ==
- Arca (restaurant), a restaurant-bar in Tulum, Mexico
- Arca-Filmproduktion GmbH, the German film production company of Gero Wecker
- Arca Fondi SGR, Italian asset management company
- Arca Noae, developers of ArcaOS, an operating system based on OS/2
- Arca South, an industrial estate in the Philippines
- ARCAspace, an aerospace company based in Las Cruces, New Mexico
- NYSE Arca, an online stock exchange previously known as Archipelago

== Equipment ==
- Arca-Swiss style tripod head (camera equipment)
- arca (document store), alternately spelled archa
- Astroparticle Research with Cosmics in the Abyss, part of the KM3NeT neutrino telescope

== Organizations ==
- The American Russian Cultural Association, founded by Nicholas Roerich in 1942
- Association for Research into Crimes against Art, a non-profit organization based in Rome
- Automobile Racing Club of America, a stock car racing sanctioning formed in 1953 by John Marcum
  - ARCA Menards Series, the premier division of ARCA
  - ARCA Menards Series East, the second-tier division of ARCA
  - ARCA Menards Series West, the third-tier division of ARCA
- Automobile Racing Club of America, a sports car racing organization formed by the Collier Brothers in 1933 that was a forerunner of the Sports Car Club of America
- Associate of the Royal College of Art

== People ==
=== Arts and entertainment ===
- Arca (musician) (born 1989), a Venezuelan musician
  - Arca (album), the eponymous 2017 album by Arca

=== Sports ===
- Julio Arca (born 1981), an Argentine football (soccer) player

== Places ==
- Arça or Arsk, a townlet in Tatarstan, Russia
- Arca Caesarea, former bishopric became a double Catholic titular see (Latin and Maronite), present-day Arqa

== Other uses ==
- Arca (bivalve), a genus of ark clams

== See also ==
- Arcas (disambiguation)
- Arka (disambiguation)
- Arc (disambiguation)
- Arqa, a village in Lebanon
