= Arcas (disambiguation) =

Arcas is a figure in Greek mythology.

Arcas may also refer to:

- Arcas, an epithet of the Greek god Hermes
- Arkas (comics), Greek comics artist
- Arcas, Cuenca, a municipality in Cuenca, Castile-La Mancha, Spain
- Arcas (Macedo de Cavaleiros), a Portuguese parish
- Arcas (rocket), a sounding rocket
- Arcas (butterfly), a genus of butterflies
- Arcas (crater), a crater on Jupiter's moon Callisto

== See also ==
- Arca (disambiguation)
- Arkas (disambiguation)
