= Arkas =

Arkas may refer to one of the following:

- Arkas (comics), the Greek comics artist
- Arcas, the son of Zeus and Kallisto
- Arkas (planet) or HD 81688 b, an exoplanet
- Arkas, Republic of Dagestan, a rural locality in Dagestan, Russia
- Arkas Spor, professional volleyball team based in Izmir, Turkey
- Arkas Container Transport, a Turkish shipping line
- Mykola Arkas (1853–1909), Ukrainian composer, writer, and historian

== See also ==
- Arka (disambiguation)
- Arcas (disambiguation)
