= Evenus =

Evenus /ɛˈviːnəs/, Euenos /juːˈiːnəs/, Evinos, or Evenos may refer to:

- Evinos, a river in western Greece
- Evenus (mythology), a river god and two mythological kings in ancient Greece
- Evenus (butterfly), a butterfly genus, occasionally misspelled Euenus
- Euenus (Euenos, Evenus) of Paros, Ancient Greek philosopher
- Évenos, France, a commune in the Var department
