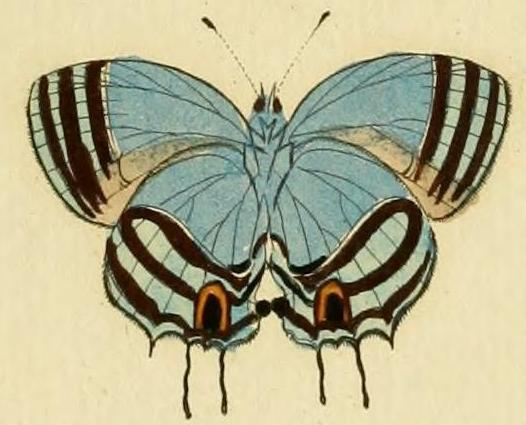

Scientific classification
- Domain: Eukaryota
- Kingdom: Animalia
- Phylum: Arthropoda
- Class: Insecta
- Order: Lepidoptera
- Family: Lycaenidae
- Genus: Paiwarria
- Species: P. venulius

Binomial name
- Paiwarria venulius

Synonyms
- Papilio venulius Cramer, [1779]

= Paiwarria venulius =

Species of butterfly

Paiwarria venulius is a species of butterfly of the family Lycaenidae. It is found in Suriname, Colombia, and Southern Brazil.
