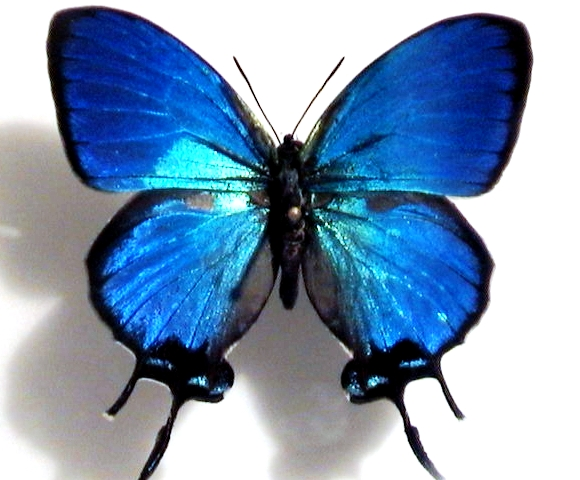
- Male, top

Scientific classification
- Domain: Eukaryota
- Kingdom: Animalia
- Phylum: Arthropoda
- Class: Insecta
- Order: Lepidoptera
- Family: Lycaenidae
- Subfamily: Theclinae
- Tribe: Eumaeini
- Genus: Evenus
- Species: E. coronata

Binomial name
- Evenus coronata (Hewitson, 1865)

Synonyms
- Thecla coronata Hewitson, 1865

= Evenus coronata =

Species of butterfly

Evenus coronata, the crowned hairstreak, is a butterfly of the family Lycaenidae. It is found from southern Mexico up to Ecuador in a wide coastal area.

The wingspan can range up to 60 mm in males. Evenus coronata is a large, neotropical hairstreak butterfly.

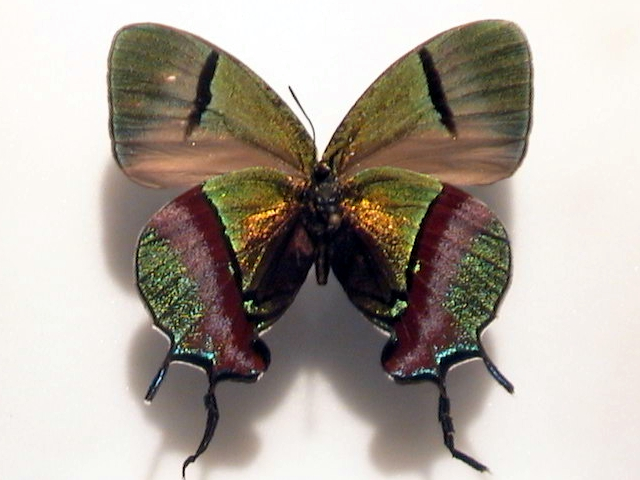
Male, bottom

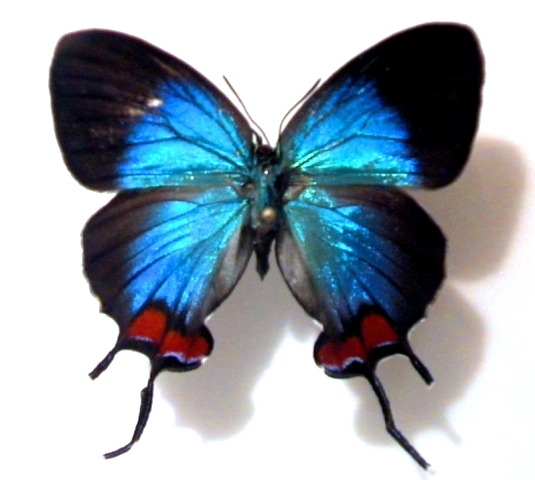
Female
