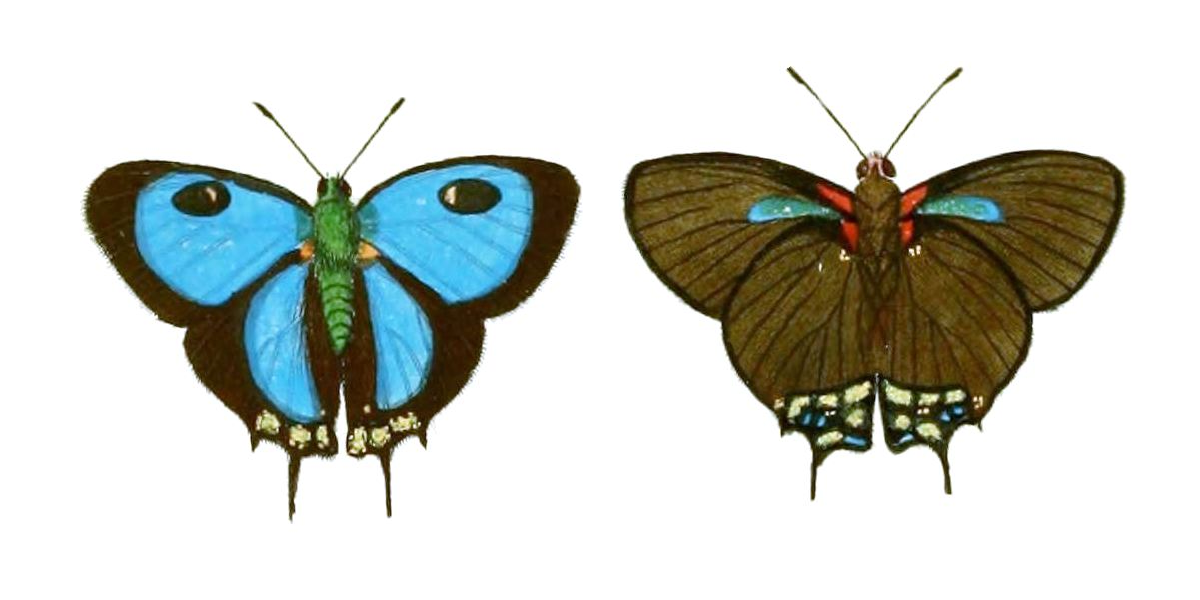
- The type specimen from above (left) and below

Conservation status
- Apparently Secure (NatureServe)

Scientific classification
- Kingdom: Animalia
- Phylum: Arthropoda
- Class: Insecta
- Order: Lepidoptera
- Family: Lycaenidae
- Genus: Atlides
- Species: A. halesus

Binomial name
- Atlides halesus (Cramer, 1777)

= Great purple hairstreak =

Species of butterfly

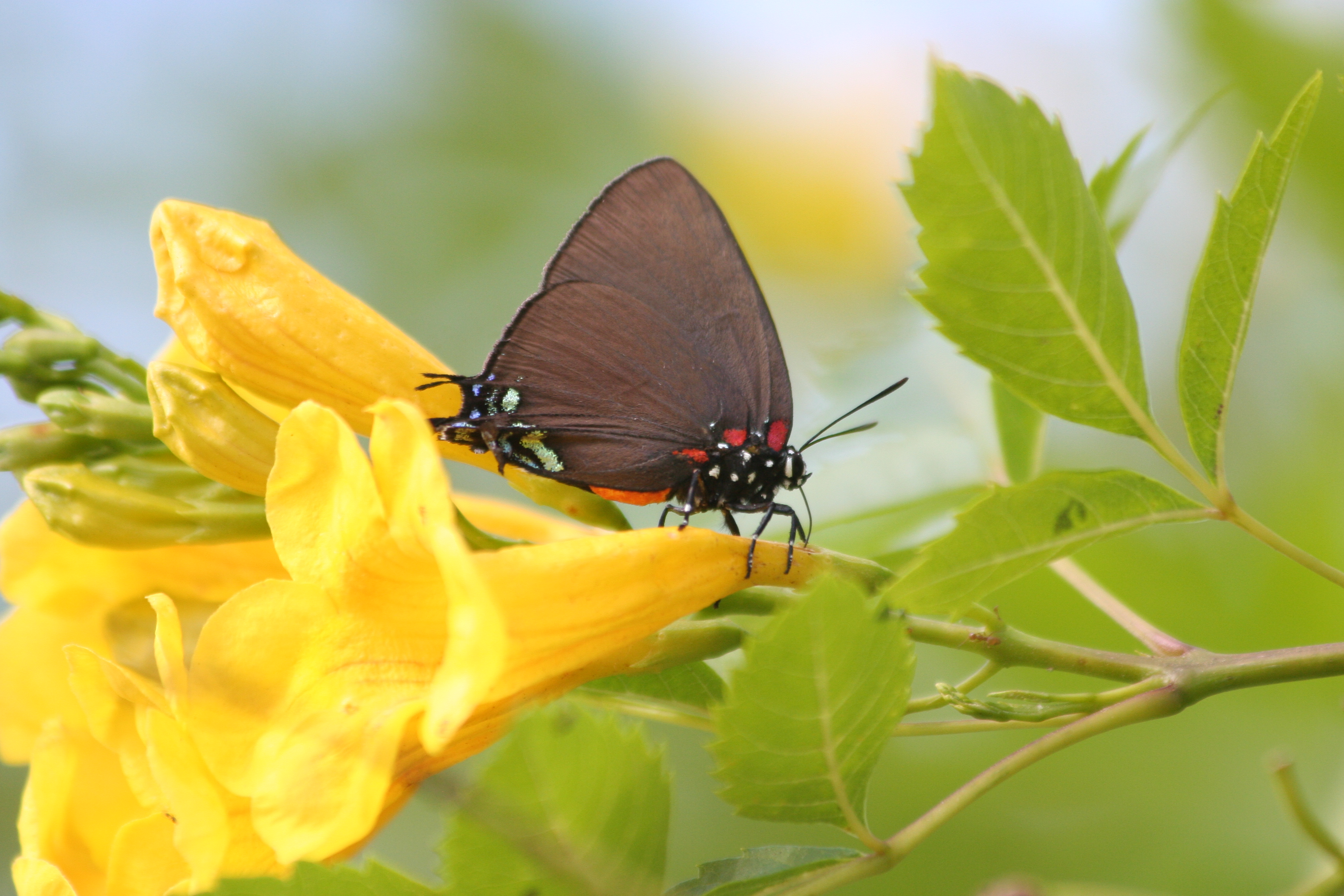
Resting female in Rio Grande Valley, Texas, USA

The great purple hairstreak (Atlides halesus), also called the great blue hairstreak, is a common gossamer-winged butterfly species in parts of the United States. It is actually a Neotropical species; its North American range only includes the warm-temperate and subtropical parts of that continent, and it ranges southwards almost to the Isthmus of Panama. The type specimen, however, was shipped to Europe from the Colony of Virginia, probably around the time of the United States Declaration of Independence.

The common names refer to the butterfly's two main colors – dusky purple on the underside, and iridescent blue above. Particularly the males are very colorful in flight – brilliant blue and velvety black, with bright red and golden markings – but when sitting down they show their inconspicuous dusky purple underside. On each hindwing, there are two tails, with one short and one long tail, lending itself to the name "hairstreak". Several subspecies are recognized.

Its caterpillar larvae feed on the mistletoe genus Phoradendron.

== Description ==
The wingspan on the adult butterfly ranges from 1.25 to 1.5 inches. Despite its common name "great purple hairstreak", this butterfly does not sport any purple coloration. Instead, the upper-side of the wings are iridescent blue at the center, with a black border, and males typically have both a more extensive and brighter blue wing coloration when compared to their female counterparts. On the hind wings, the butterfly has two sets of tails of unequal length, which are the "hairstreaks" of this butterfly. The under-side of the wings are black, with orange-gold colored spots, with one spot on each of the front wings, and two spots on each hind-wing near the tails. The abdomen of the butterfly features a blue upper-side and an orange under-side.

Like other butterfly species, the morphology of Atlides halesus' hindwings mimic a head. The combination of the tails, resembling antennae of a butterfly, along with the orange spots on each hind-wing, which resembles eyes, gives the butterfly a "false head". When perching, the butterfly will also orient their body so the tails point upwards while the real head points downwards, in addition to moving their bodies back and forth. The morphology of the hindwings along with this behavior will direct the attention of predators towards the false head, allowing the butterfly to minimize damage towards essential regions of the body by deflecting attack towards the less vulnerable hindwings.

== Life History ==
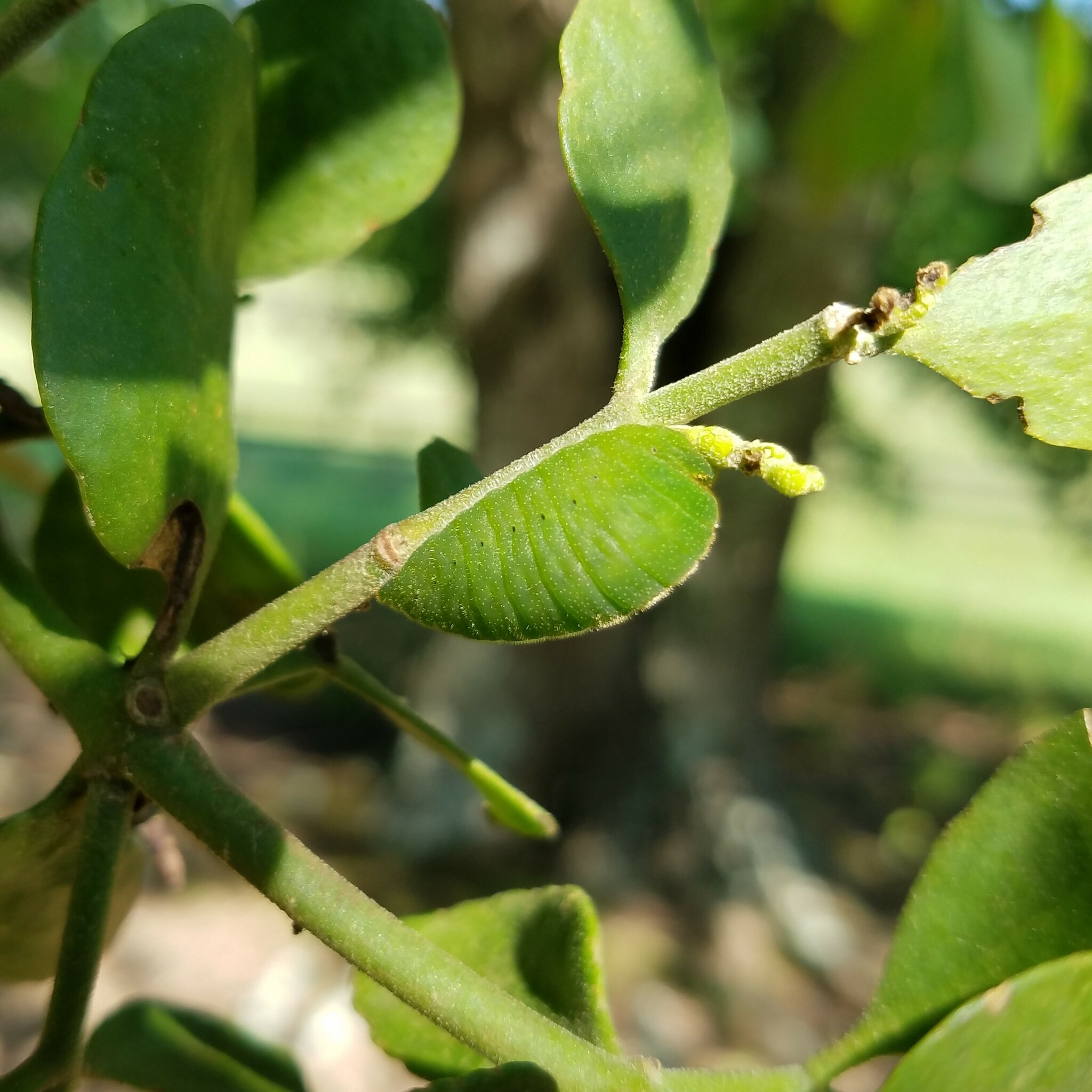
A larva feeding on American mistletoe (Phoradendron leucarpum) in Georgia

=== Eggs ===
Males of this species wait for possible mates for mating on tall perches such as trees. The mated females then choose mistletoe plants for oviposition. The eggs are laid in either groups or by themselves on the host plant. The eggs appear white with a hard and solid outer surface. During oviposition, female butterflies will lay as many as twenty single eggs at different locations on the leaves of a mistletoe plant.

=== Larvae ===
After hatching, larvae will emerge from the top of the egg, leaving behind an opening at the top of the egg. Once hatched, the larvae do not consume their egg shells as a first source of nutrition as other species of butterflies do. Instead, they go straight into feeding on their host plant's leaves and male flowers until fully grown. The species gains protective toxins from their larval host plants that stay in their system into adulthood. The larvae are not colored in a way that warns predators of this, they instead match the green color and round shape of their host plant's foliage. This coloration will darken as the caterpillar ages, which also allows for successful camouflage with the leaves of their mistletoe host plant. Caterpillars are commonly spotted in the spring to early summer and have been primarily found on leaves and non-woody stems of mistletoe. Caterpillars will feed on the leaves of their host plant until time of pupation, which is around 20 days from hatching to pupation. The larvae mainly feeds on young leaves on the mistletoe plant, with early instar larvae being unable to chew through older leaves until they develop into late instar caterpillars. In addition, caterpillars have been observed to entirely defoliate their host plant before, leaving behind only the stems.

=== Pupa ===
Next, the larvae pupate in well-protected areas close to the base of trees under pieces of bark or fallen leaves. Pupae appear dark brown and after about a minimum of 16 days, pupae will emerge as the adult stage butterfly.

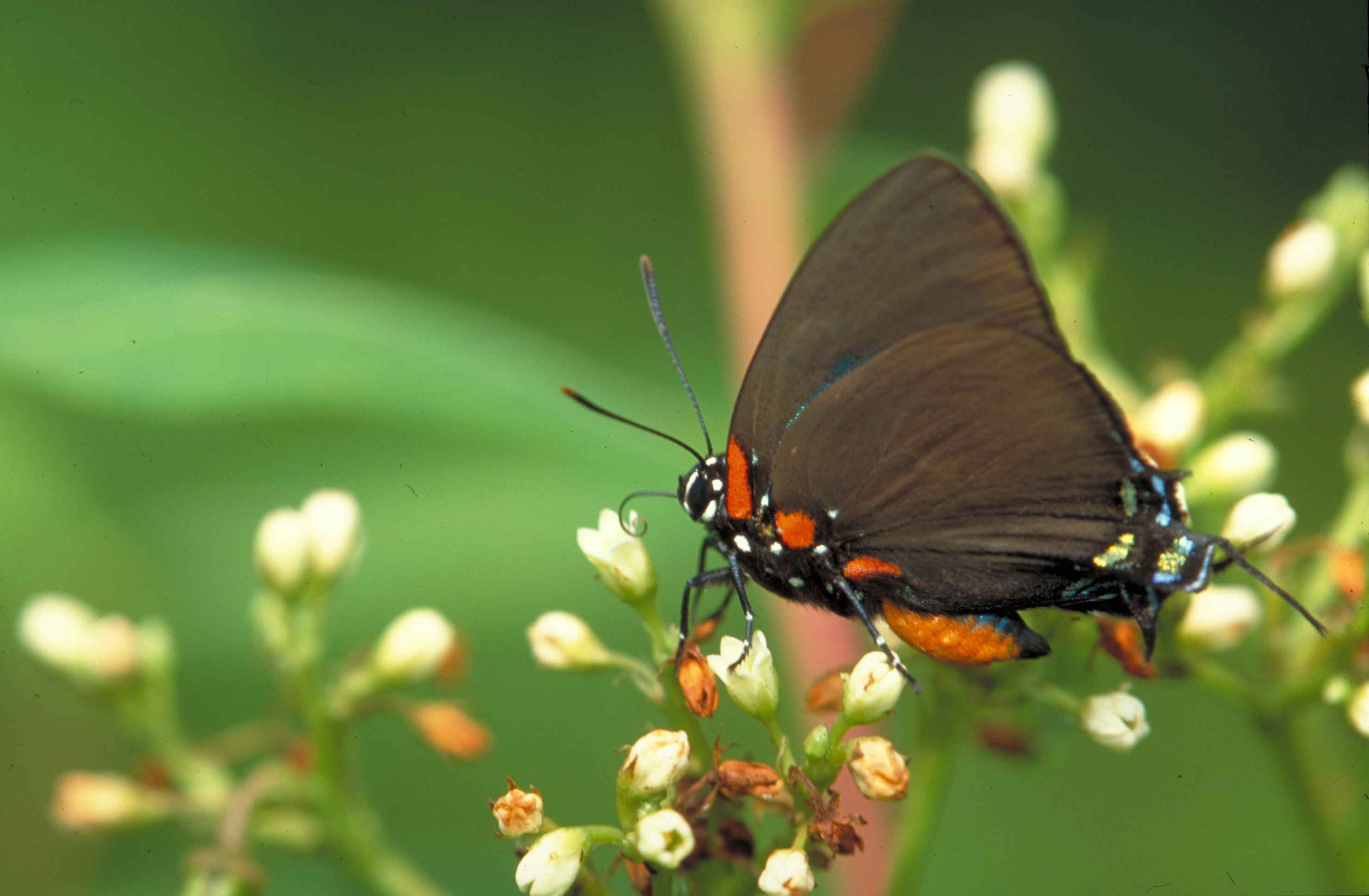
Adult butterfly with the false head on the back wings

=== Adult ===
After about 16 days from pupation to hatching, the adult butterfly will emerge from its chrysalis. Adult butterflies have their orange and black colorings to signal the protective toxins and even have a behavior of rubbing their wings together. This draws attention to the markings on their back wings that serve as a "false head". During flight season, which stretches from spring to early summer, and from early fall to winter, ovipositing females preferentially target isolated mistletoe plants that have trunks of a smaller diameter to lay their eggs on, which is likely to minimize competition from other ovipositing butterflies.

The great purple hairstreak has various natural enemies including parasitoid wasps, the species being Apanteles sp. as well as Metadontia amoena.
