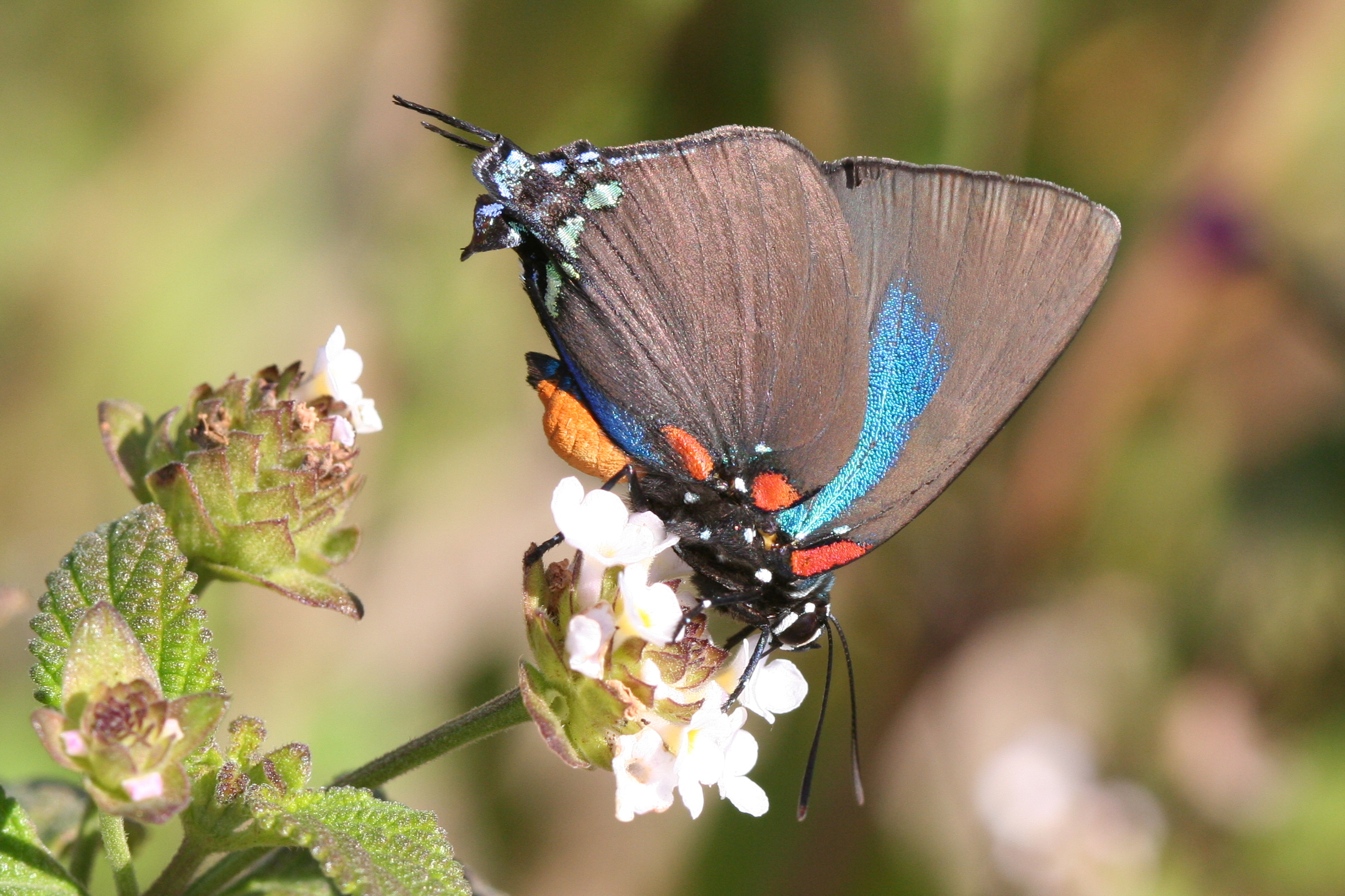
- The great purple hairstreak (A. halesus) hides most of its brilliant color when sitting down

Scientific classification
- Kingdom: Animalia
- Phylum: Arthropoda
- Clade: Pancrustacea
- Class: Insecta
- Order: Lepidoptera
- Family: Lycaenidae
- Tribe: Eumaeini
- Genus: Atlides; Hübner, [1819]

Synonyms
- Riojana D'Abrera & Bálint, 2001 (may be nomen nudum)

= Atlides =

Butterfly genus in family Lycaenidae

Atlides is a genus of gossamer-winged butterflies (family Lycaenidae). Among these, it belongs to the tribe Eumaeini of the subfamily Theclinae. These small butterflies are widespread in the Americas, occurring almost anywhere between the southern United States and Argentina.

== Species ==
18 named and 5 (or more) undescribed species are known or assumed to belong to this genus:

- Atlides atys (Cramer, 1779) - Costa Rica to southern Brazil
- Atlides bacis (Godman & Salvin, 1887) - Costa Rica to southern Brazil
- Atlides browni Constantino, 1993 - Colombia and Ecuador
- Atlides carpasia (Hewitson, 1868) - Mexico to Panama
- Atlides carpophora (Hewitson, 1868) - Mexico to western Ecuador, Northern Venezuela to eastern Peru
- Atlides cosa (Hewitson, 1867) - eastern Brazil
- Atlides dahnersi Bálint, 2003, - western Colombia
- Atlides gaumeri (Godman, 1901) - Mexico to Panama.
- Atlides halesus (Cramer, 1777) - U.S. and Mexico, south to Guatemala and Costa Rica. (great purple hairstreak, great blue hairstreak)
- Atlides halljasoni Bálint, 2006 - Colombia to Peru
- Atlides havila (Hewitson, 1865) - Colombia to Peru
- Atlides inachus (Cramer, 1775) - Amazonian Region
- Atlides misma D'Abrera, 1995 - eastern and central Brazil
- Atlides polama (Schaus, 1902) - eastern Brazil
- Atlides polybe (Linnaeus, 1763) - Mexico to southern Brazil
- Atlides rustan (Stoll, 1790) - Mexico to southern Brazil
- Atlides thargelia (Burmeister, 1878) - Bolivia to Uruguay
- Atlides zava (Hewitson, 1878) - eastern Brazil
- Atlides sp. 'Bahia'
- Atlides sp. 'Colombia'
- Atlides sp. 'Costa Rica'
- Atlides sp. 'Ecuador'
- Atlides sp. 'Peru'

A. thargelia was recently proposed for separation as monotypic genus "Riojana", but it was subsequently argued to be a nomen nudum per Article 13.1 of the ICZN Code, because an appropriate genus description was not given. The matter has been submitted to the ICZN for discussion. Regardless the questions of nomenclature, A. thargelia is for the time being retained here; given that several undescribed relatives are known to exist, splitting off monotypic lineages now runs risk of leaving the remaining group paraphyletic.
