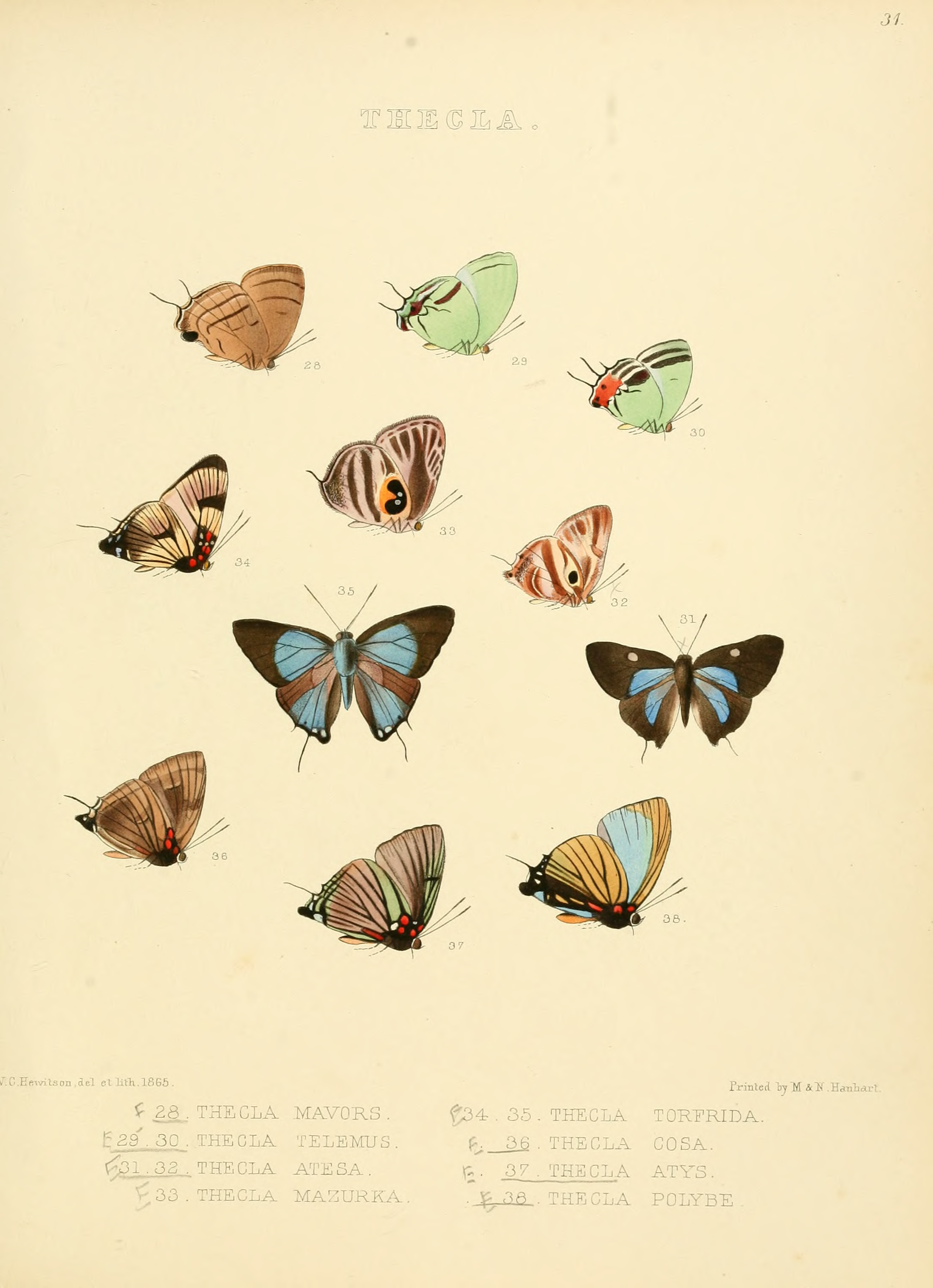
- Paiwarria telemus figures 29 (male) and 30 (female)

Scientific classification
- Domain: Eukaryota
- Kingdom: Animalia
- Phylum: Arthropoda
- Class: Insecta
- Order: Lepidoptera
- Family: Lycaenidae
- Tribe: Eumaeini
- Genus: Paiwarria; Kaye, 1904

Synonyms
- Fasslantonius Bálint & Salazar Escobar, 2003; Radissima Johnson, 1992

= Paiwarria =

Butterfly genus in family Lycaenidae

Paiwarria is a genus of butterflies in the family Lycaenidae. The species of this genus are found in the Neotropical realm.

== Species ==
- Paiwarria antinous (C. & R. Felder, [1865])
- Paiwarria aphaca (Hewitson, 1867)
- Paiwarria chuchuvia Hall & Willmott, 2005
- Paiwarria episcopalis (Fassl, 1912)
- Paiwarria telemus (Cramer, [1775])
- Paiwarria umbratus (Geyer, 1837)
- Paiwarria venulius (Cramer, [1779])
