= Arkas, Republic of Dagestan =

Arkas Аркас ГьаркӀас
- Selo
- Location within Republic of Dagestan Location within Russia
- Coordinates: 42°39′N 47°08′E
- Country: Russia
- Region: Republic of Dagestan
- District: Buynaksky District
- Time zone: UTC+3:00

Arkas (Russian: Аркас; Avar: ГьаркӀас) is a rural locality (a selo) in Buynaksky District, Republic of Dagestan, Russia. The population was 1,676 as of 2010. There are 5 streets.

== Geography ==
Arkas is located 25 km south of Buynaksk (the district's administrative centre) by road. Arykhkent is the nearest rural locality.
