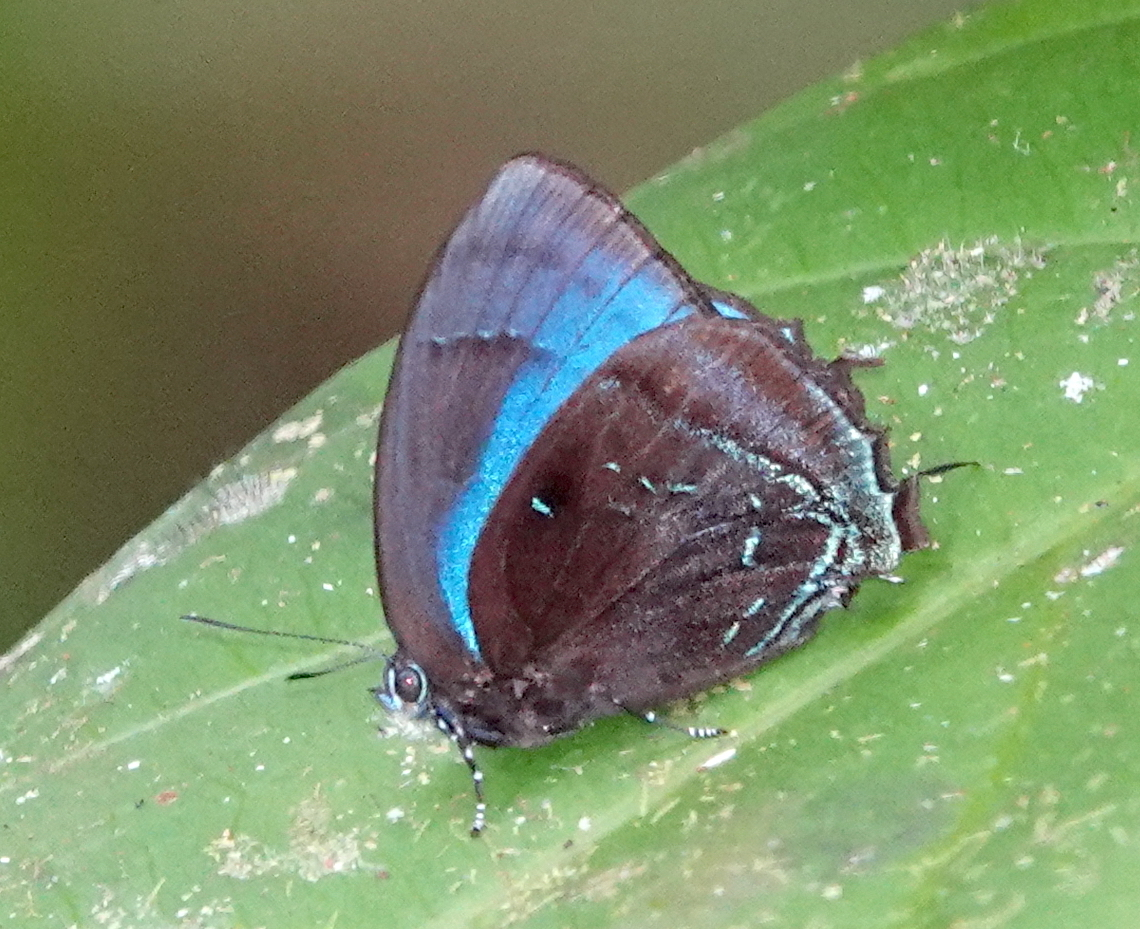
- Denivia hemon, Colombia

Scientific classification
- Kingdom: Animalia
- Phylum: Arthropoda
- Class: Insecta
- Order: Lepidoptera
- Family: Lycaenidae
- Subfamily: Theclinae
- Tribe: Eumaeini
- Genus: Denivia; Johnson, 1992

= Denivia =

Genus of butterflies

Denivia is a genus of gossamer-winged butterflies in the family Lycaenidae. There are at least 20 described species in Denivia, found in Central and South America.

The Denivia was formerly considered a synonym of the genus Theritas. In phylogenetic studies published in 2006, the following species were classified in the genus Denivia.

== Species ==
These species belong to the genus Denivia:

- Denivia acontius (Goodson, 1945) - Panama south to the Amazonian Region
- Denivia adamsi (H.H. Druce, 1909) - Peru (generic placement uncertain)
- Denivia arene (Goodson, 1945) - Ecuador and Peru
- Denivia augustinula (Goodson, 1945) - Mexico to northern Colombia
- Denivia augustula (W.F. Kirby, 1877) - Costa Rica and Panama to western Ecuador
- Denivia chaluma (Schaus, 1902) - central and southern Brazil
- Denivia curitabaensis (K. Johnson, 1992) - Brazil
- Denivia deniva (Hewitson, 1874) - Argentina and Southern Brazil
- Denivia espiritosanto Bálint & Moser, 2007 - eastern Brazil
- Denivia hemon (Cramer, 1775) - Neotropics
- Denivia lisus (Stoll, 1790) - Mexico to southern Brazil
- Denivia monica (Hewitson, 1867) - Venezuela to Bolivia
- Denivia phegeus (Hewitson, 1865) - Brazil
- Denivia silma (Martins, Faynel, & Robbins, 2016) - Amazonian Region south to Paraguay and Brazil
- Denivia theocritus (Fabricius, 1793) - Mexico to western Ecuador
- Denivia viresco (H.H. Druce, 1907) - Amazonian Region
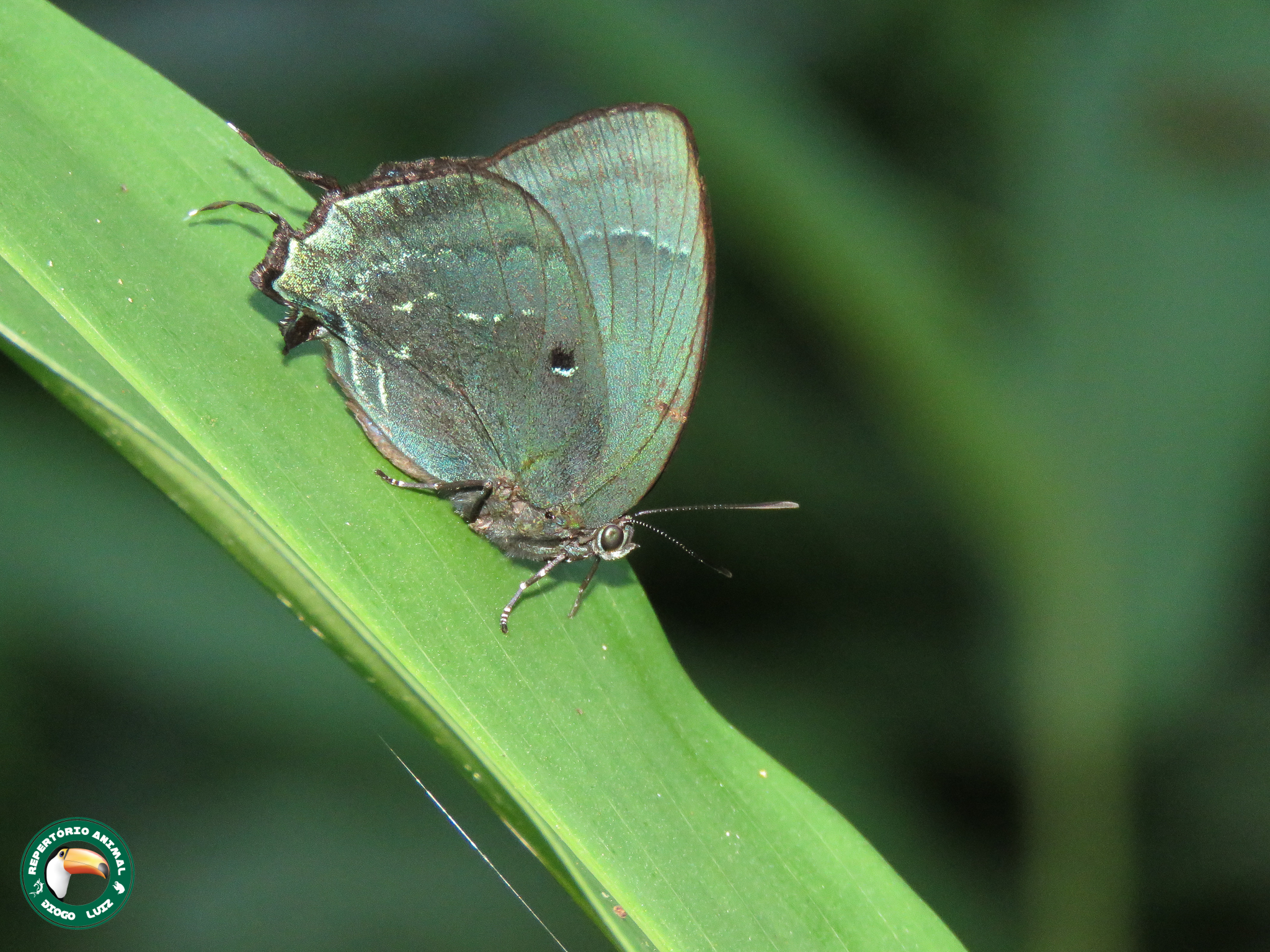
Denivia phegeus, Brasil

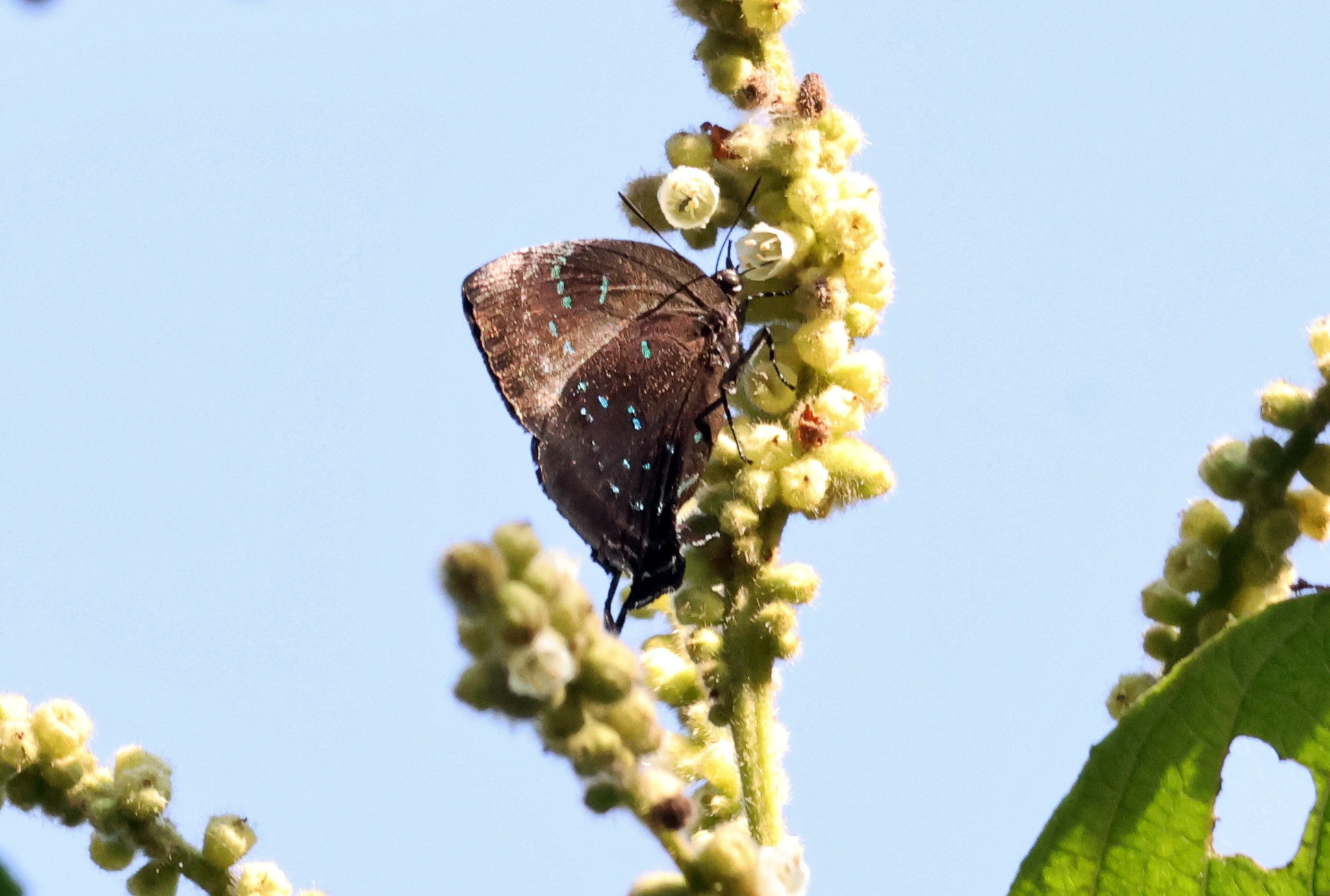
Denivia theocritus, Honduras

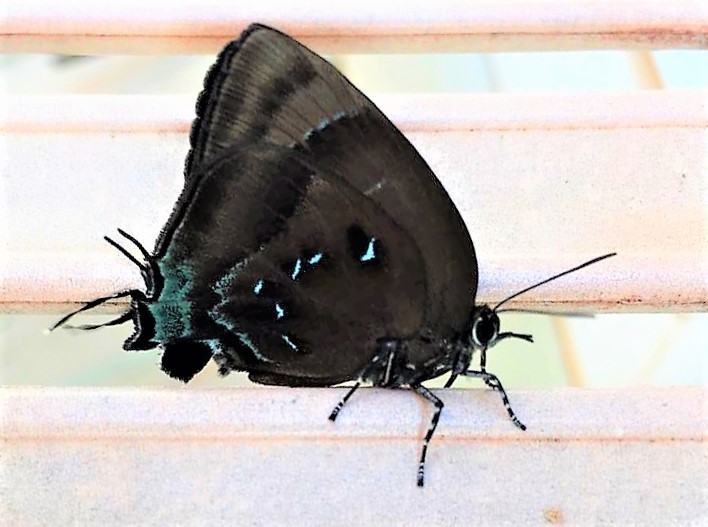
Denivia lisus, Surinam

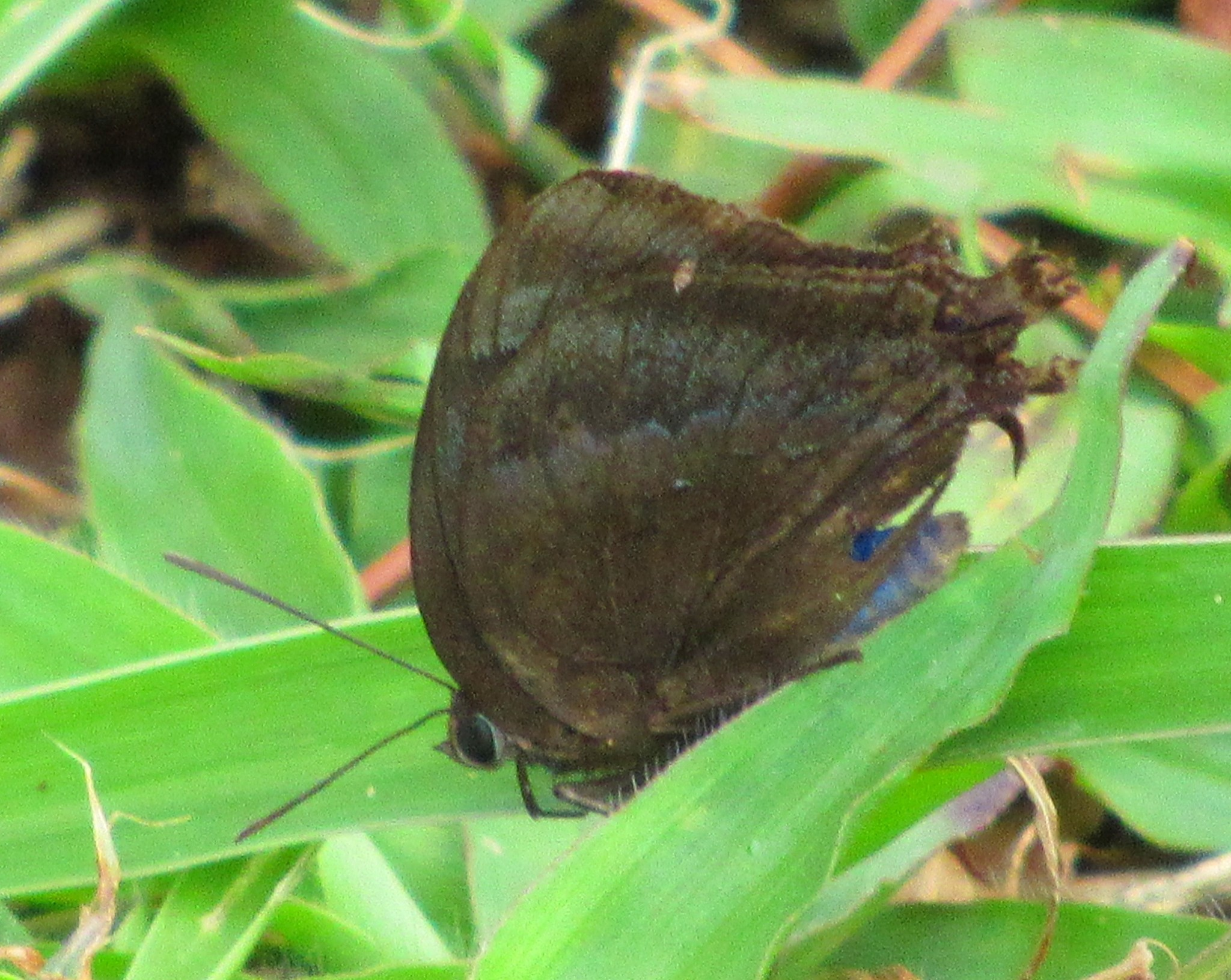
Denivia espiritosanto, Brasil

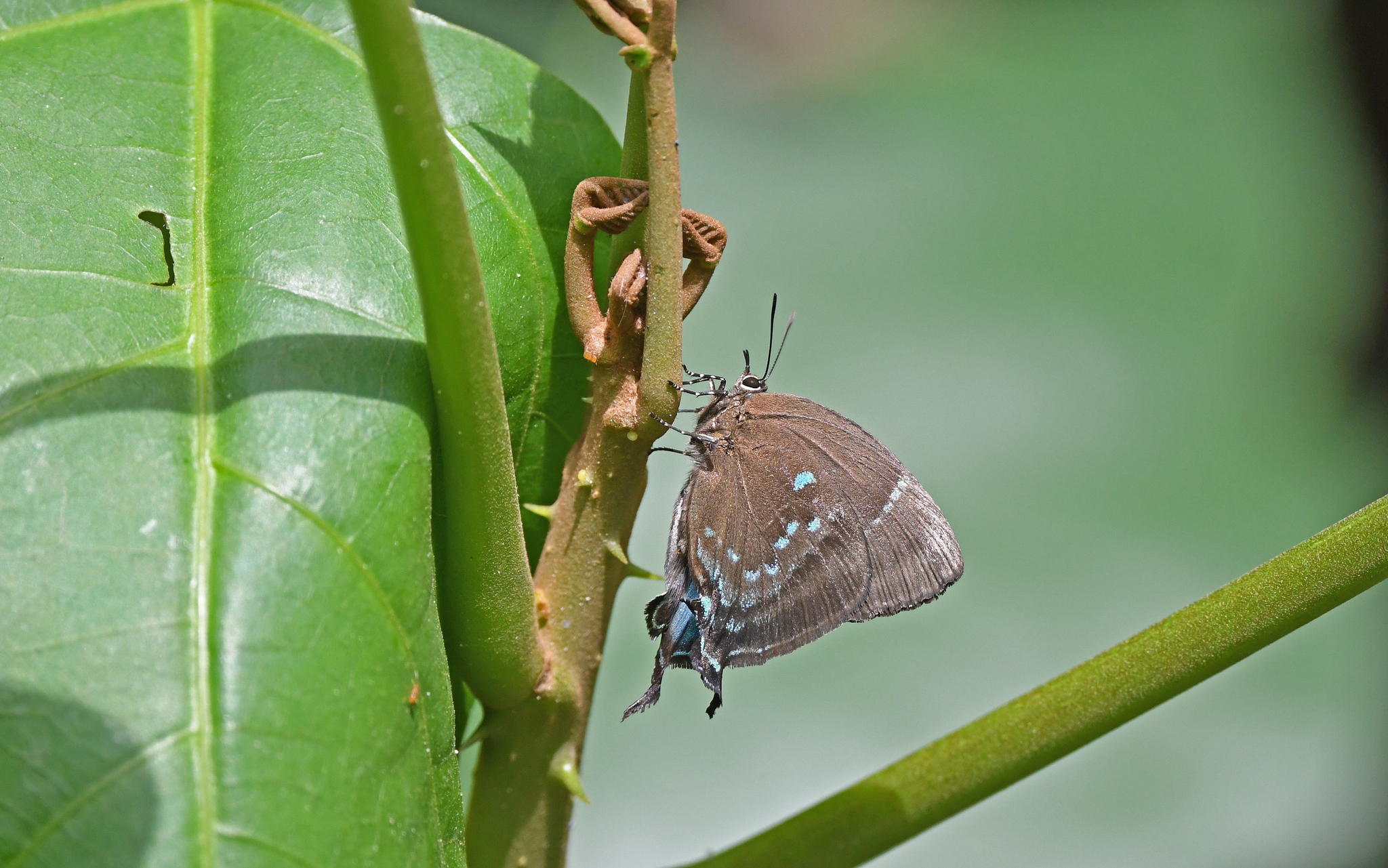
Denivia monica, Perú

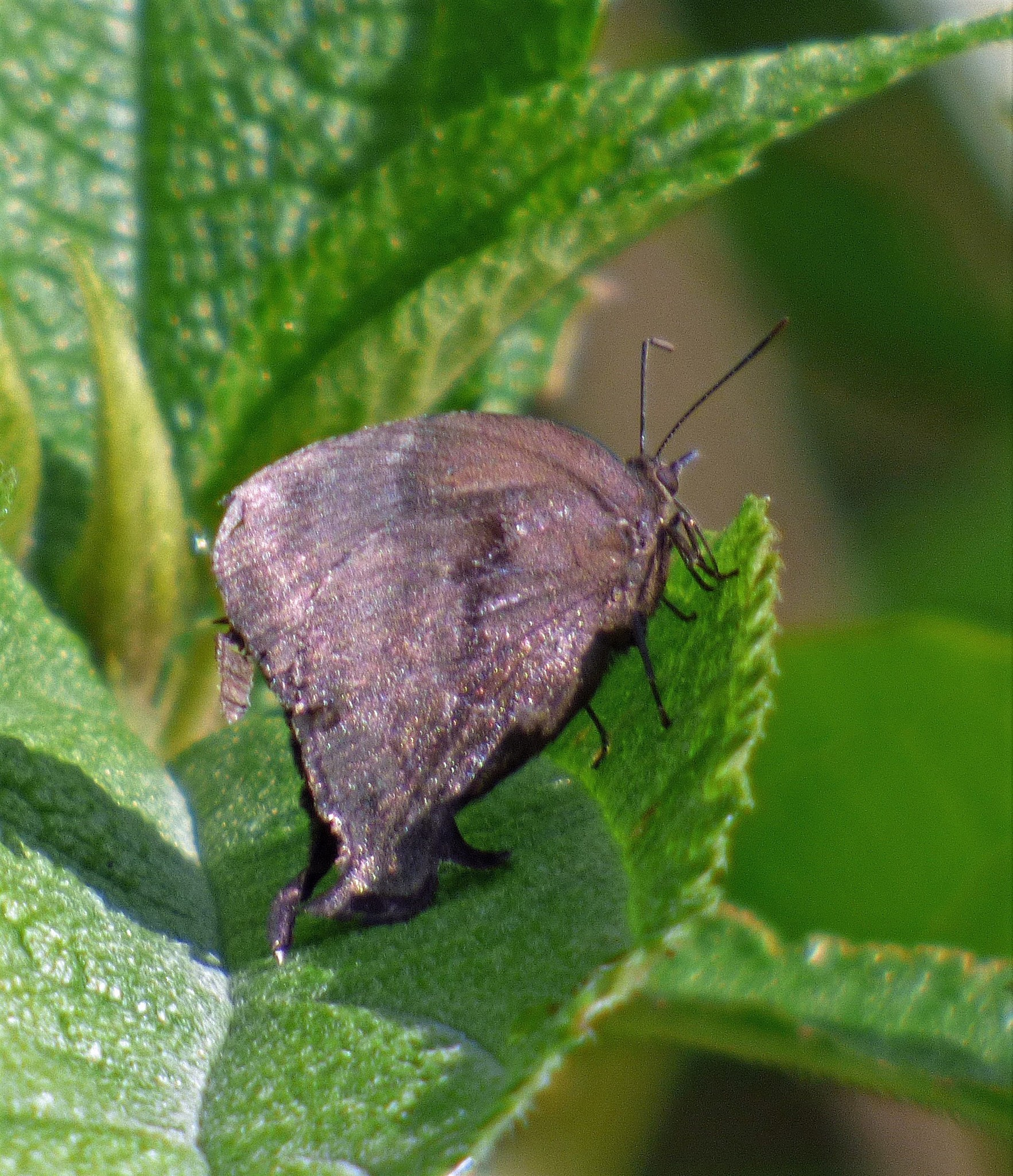
Denivia chaluma, Argentina
