= Arka, Hungary =

Arka
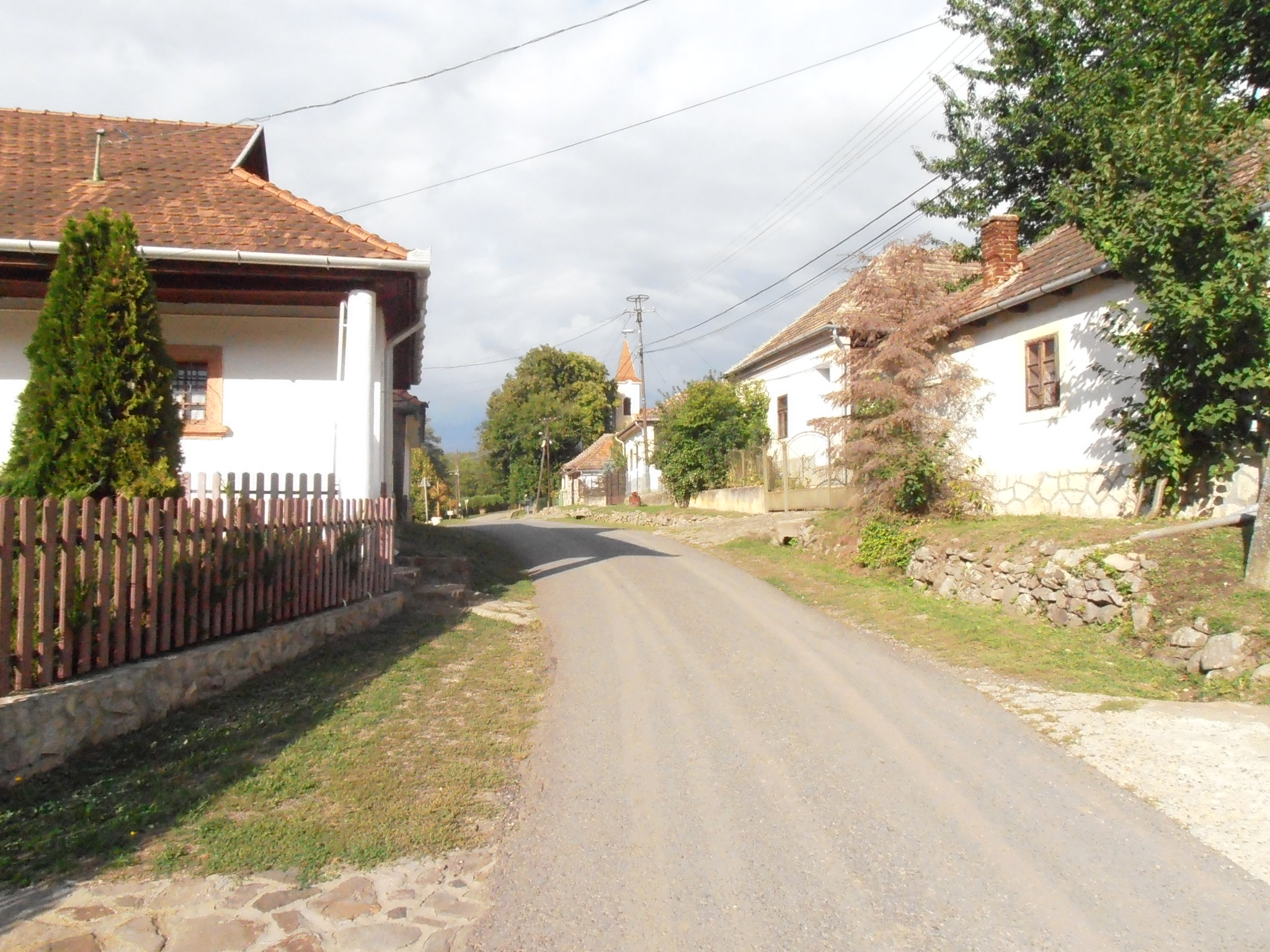

- Location of Borsod-Abaúj-Zemplén county in Hungary

- Location of Arka in Hungary
- Coordinates: 48°21′20″N 21°15′9″E
- Country: Hungary
- County: Borsod-Abaúj-Zemplén

Area
  - Total: 9.49 km^{2} (3.66 sq mi)

Population (2015)
  - Total: 54
  - Density: 5.7/km^{2} (15/sq mi)
- Time zone: UTC+1 (CET)
  - Summer (DST): UTC+2 (CEST)
- Postal code: 3885
- Area code: 46

Arka (Slovak: Jarka) is a village in Borsod-Abaúj-Zemplén county, Hungary.

== See also ==
- Arka Gdynia
