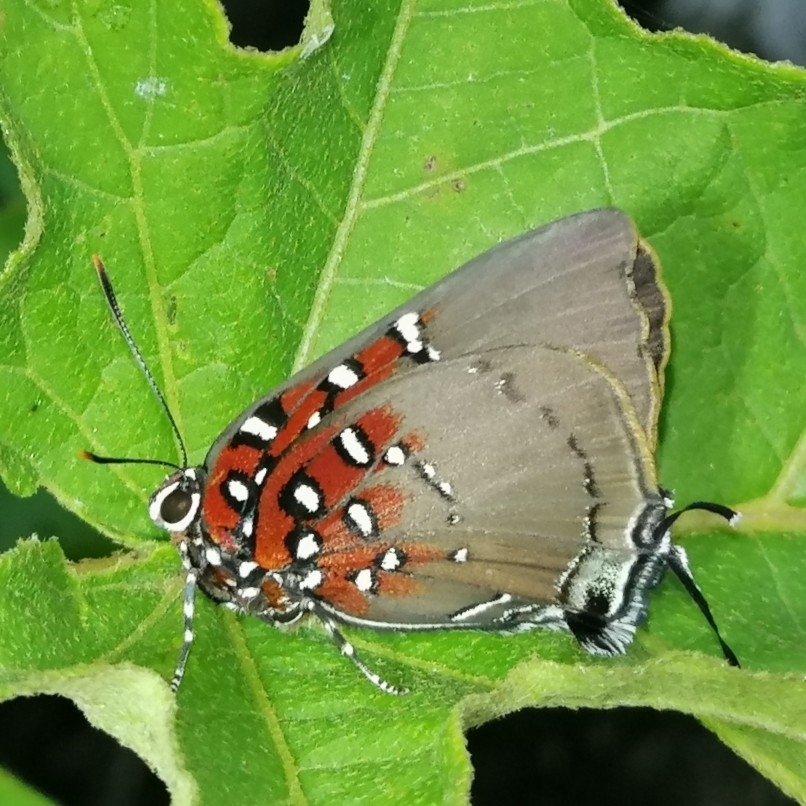
- Brangas getus, Bolivia

Scientific classification
- Kingdom: Animalia
- Phylum: Arthropoda
- Clade: Pancrustacea
- Class: Insecta
- Order: Lepidoptera
- Family: Lycaenidae
- Subfamily: Theclinae
- Tribe: Eumaeini
- Genus: Brangas; Hübner, 1819

= Brangas =

Genus of butterflies

Brangas is a genus of hairstreaks in the butterfly family Lycaenidae, found in Mexico, Central America, and South America. There are about 16 described species in Brangas.

== Species ==
These species belong to the genus Brangas:

- Brangas caranus (Stoll, 1780) - western Ecuador to French Guiana, south to southern Brazil
- Brangas carthaea (Hewitson, 1868) - Mexico to western Ecuador
- Brangas coccineifrons (Godman & Salvin, 1887) - Mexico to western Ecuador
- Brangas dydimaon (Cramer, 1777) - Amazonian Region
- Brangas felderi (Goodson, 1945) - Colombia to Peru
- Brangas getus (Fabricius, 1787) - Mexico to Argentina, Paraguay, and southern Brazil
- Brangas insolitus Bálint & Faynel, 2008 - Ecuador to Peru
- Brangas moserorum Bálint & Faynel, 2008 - Paraguay and southern Brazil
- Brangas neildonatus Bálint & Faynel, 2008 - Venezuelan northern coast.
- Brangas neora (Hewitson, 1867) - Mexico to southern Brazil
- Brangas polonus Bálint, 2008 - Peru to Bolivia
- Brangas rambutorum Bálint & Faynel, 2008 - Venezuela and Colombia in dry forest.
- Brangas rita (Goodson, 1945) - Costa Rica to western Colombia and Ecuador
- Brangas silumena (Hewitson, 1867) - Paraguay and Brazil
- Brangas teucria (Hewitson, 1868) - Amazonian Region
- Brangas torfrida (Hewitson, 1867) - Neotropics, Amazonian and Atlantic regions
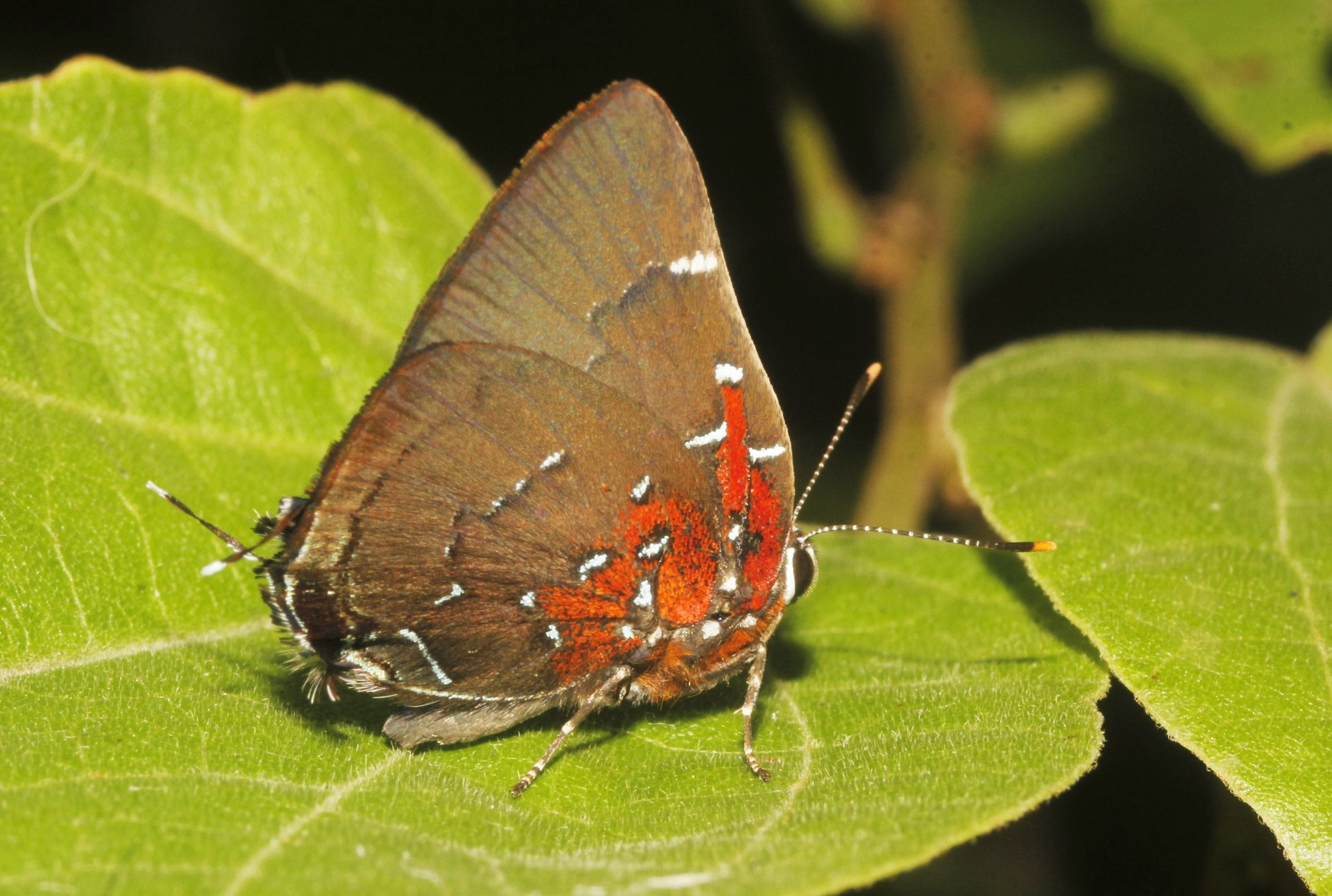
Brangas neora, México

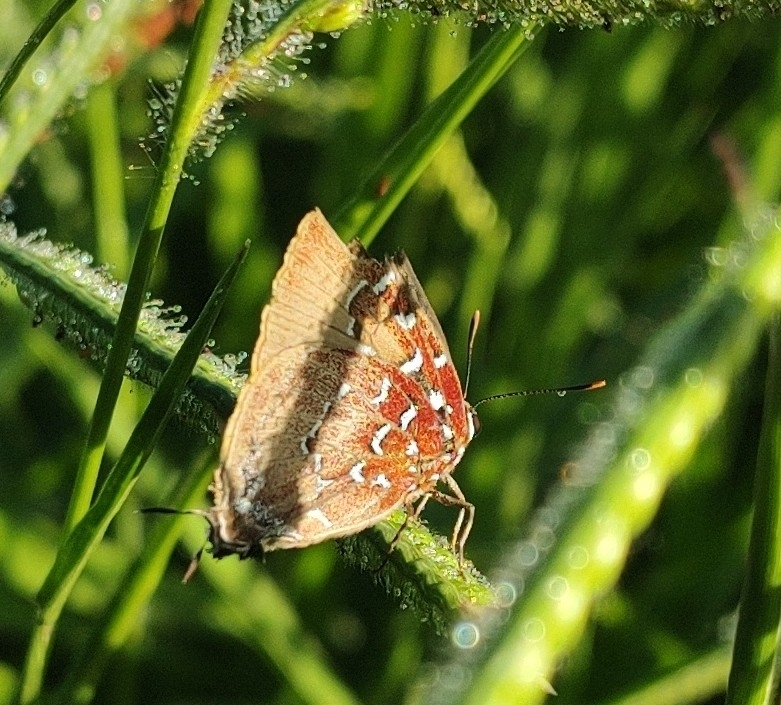
Brangas silumena, Brasil

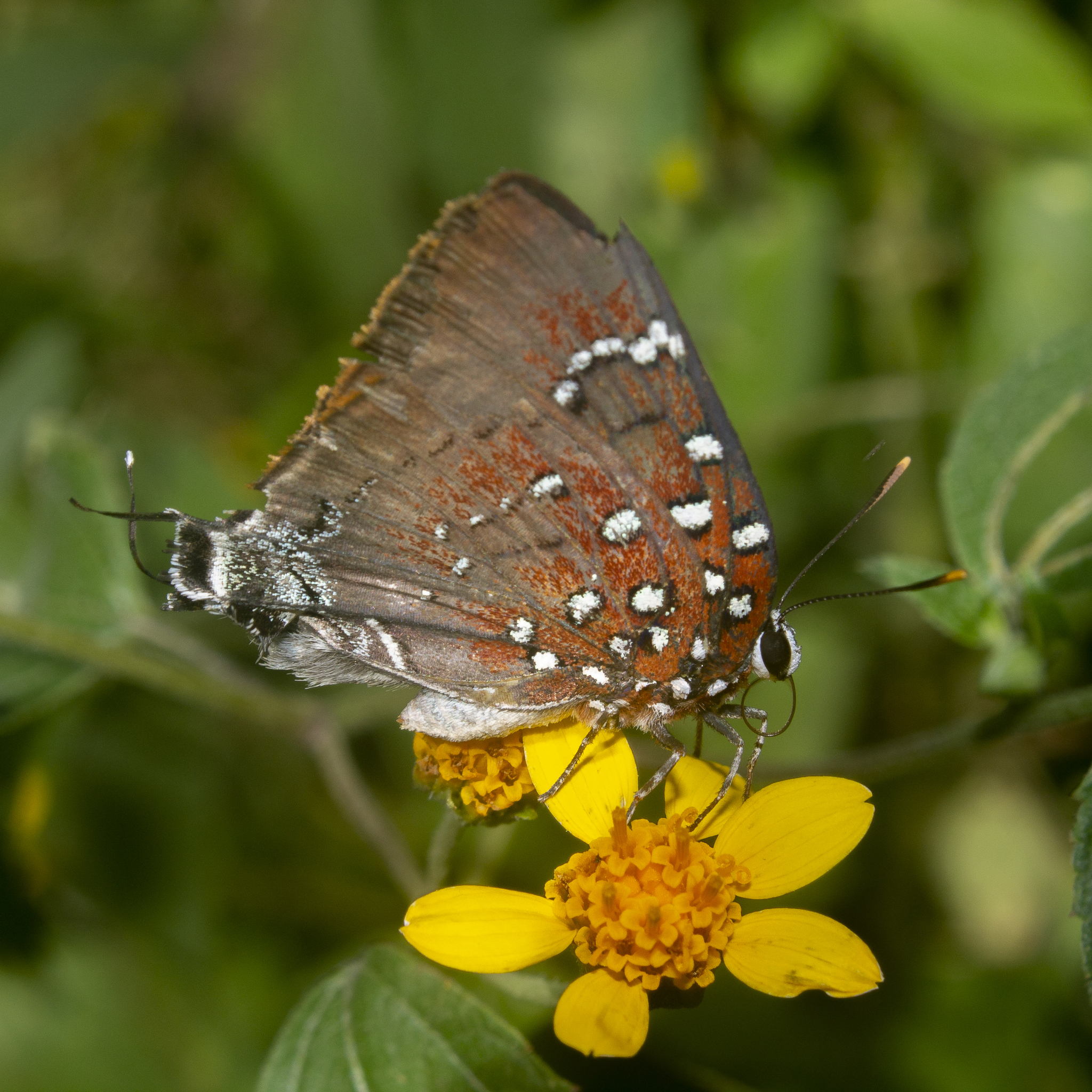
Brangas rambutorum, Colombia
