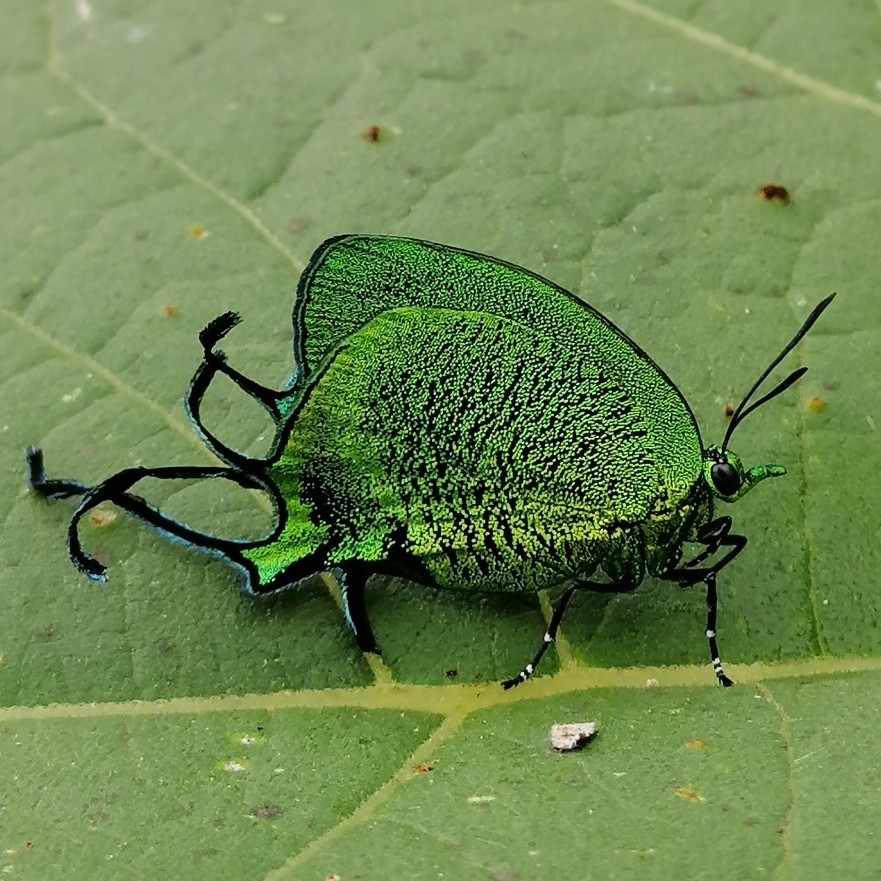
- Arcas imperialis, Bolivia

Scientific classification
- Domain: Eukaryota
- Kingdom: Animalia
- Phylum: Arthropoda
- Class: Insecta
- Order: Lepidoptera
- Family: Lycaenidae
- Subfamily: Theclinae
- Tribe: Eumaeini
- Genus: Arcas; Swainson, 1832

= Arcas (butterfly) =

Genus of butterflies

Arcas is a genus of gossamer-wings in the butterfly family Lycaenidae. There are about six described species in Arcas, found in the Neotropics. The sister genus of Arcas is Theritas.

== Species ==
These nine species belong to the genus Arcas:

- Arcas alleluia Bálint, 2002 - eastern Peru
- Arcas cypria (Geyer, 1837) - Mexico to Venezuela and Colombia
- Arcas delphia Nicolay, 1971 - Costa Rica to western Ecuador
- Arcas ducalis (Westwood, 1851) - Brazil
- Arcas gozmanyi (Bálint, 2006) - Costa Rica to western Ecuador
- Arcas imperialis (Cramer, 1775) - Mexico to Argentina and southern Brazil
- Arcas jivaro Nicolay, 1971 - Ecuador to Bolivia
- Arcas splendor (H.H. Druce, 1907) - Colombia and Ecuador
- Arcas tuneta (Hewitson, 1865) - The Guianas to southern Brazil
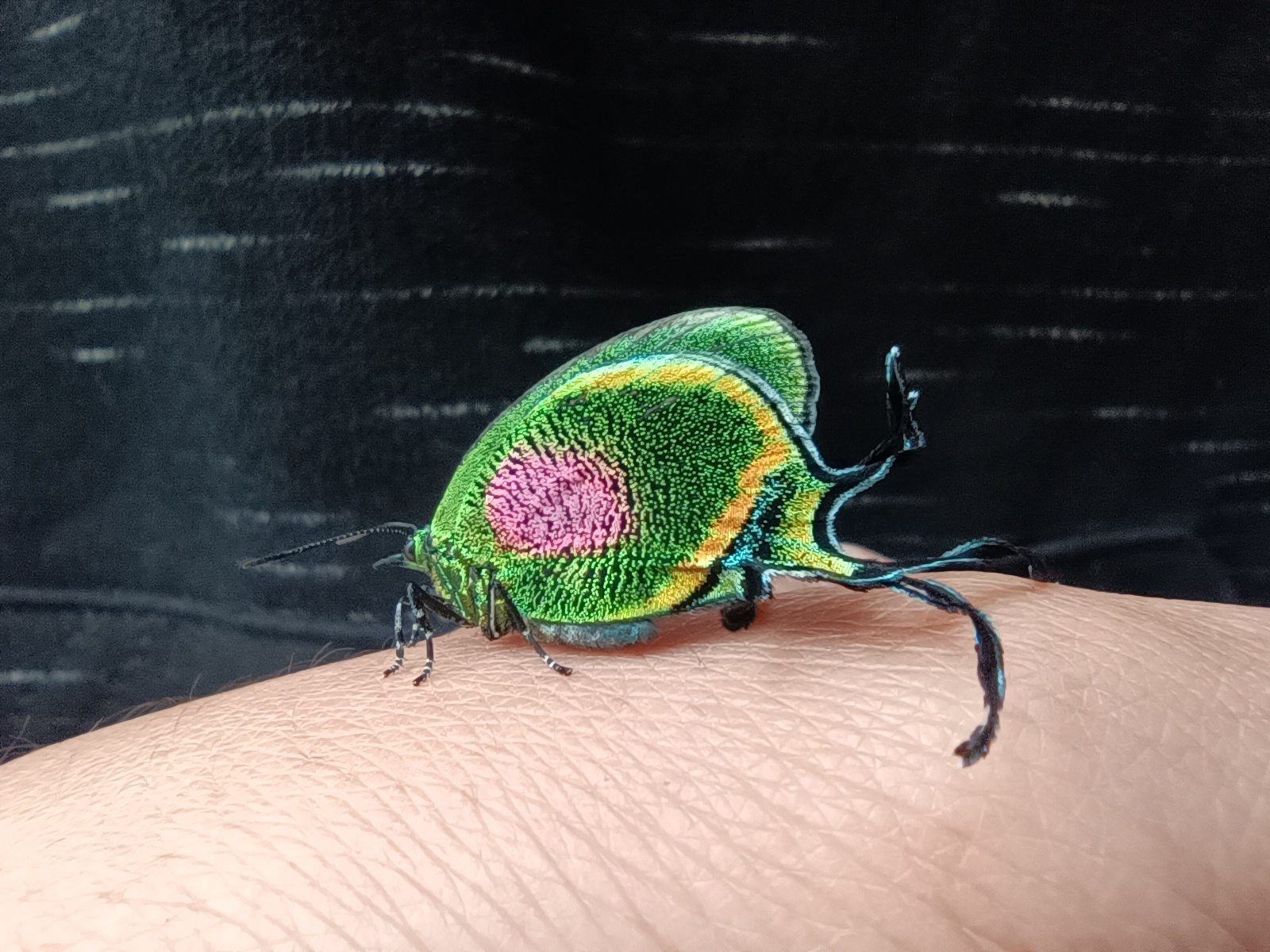
Arcas ducalis, Brasil

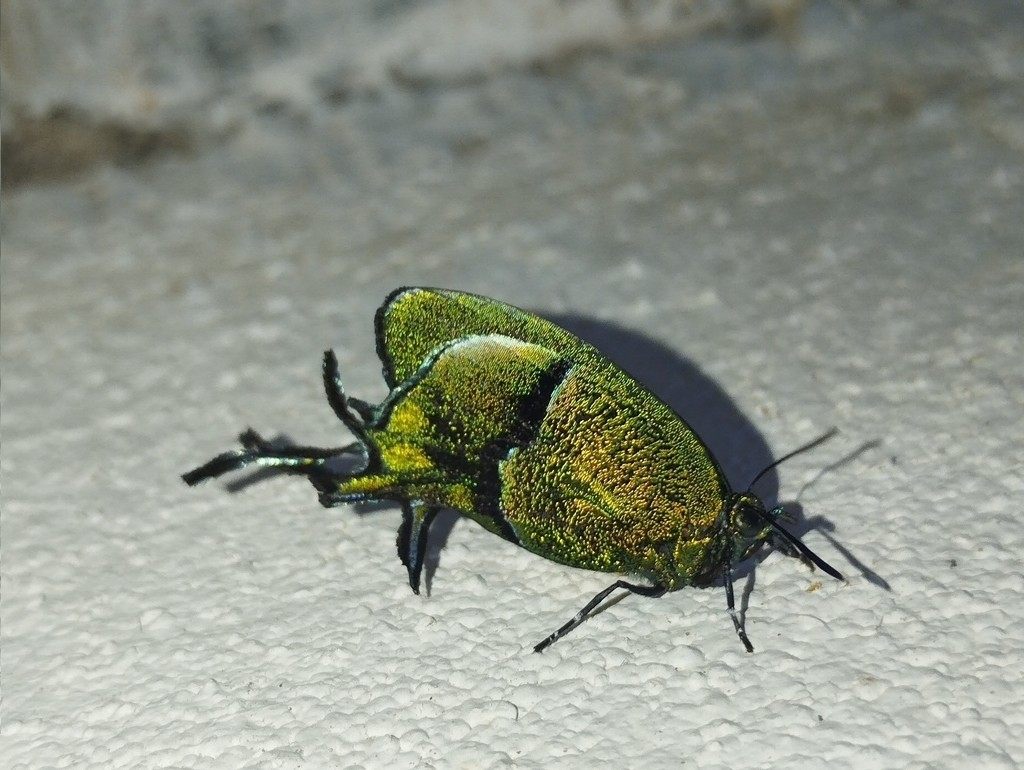
Arcas cypria, México

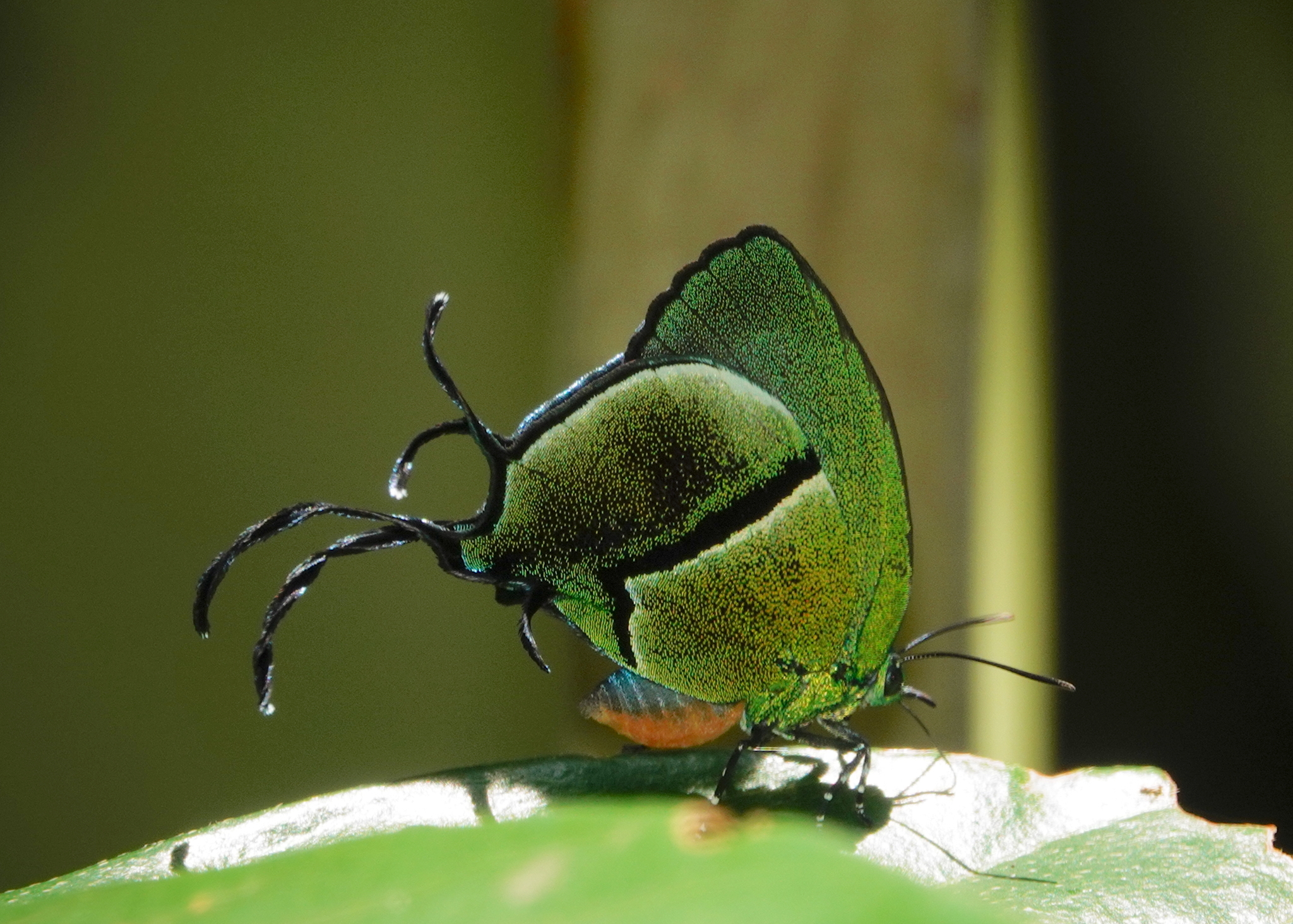
Arcas tuneta, Peru
