= Airamanna =

Scientific classification
- Domain: Eukaryota
- Kingdom: Animalia
- Phylum: Arthropoda
- Class: Insecta
- Order: Lepidoptera
- Family: Lycaenidae
- Tribe: Eumaeini
- Genus: Airamanna; Bálint, 2009

Genus of butterflies

Airamanna is a Neotropical genus in the family Lycaenidae.

== Species ==
- Airamanna columbia (Bálint, 2005)
- Airamanna rhapsodia (Bálint, 2005)
- Airamanna rhaptissima (K. Johnson, 1991)
