= Arkas Container Transport =

Turkish shipping company

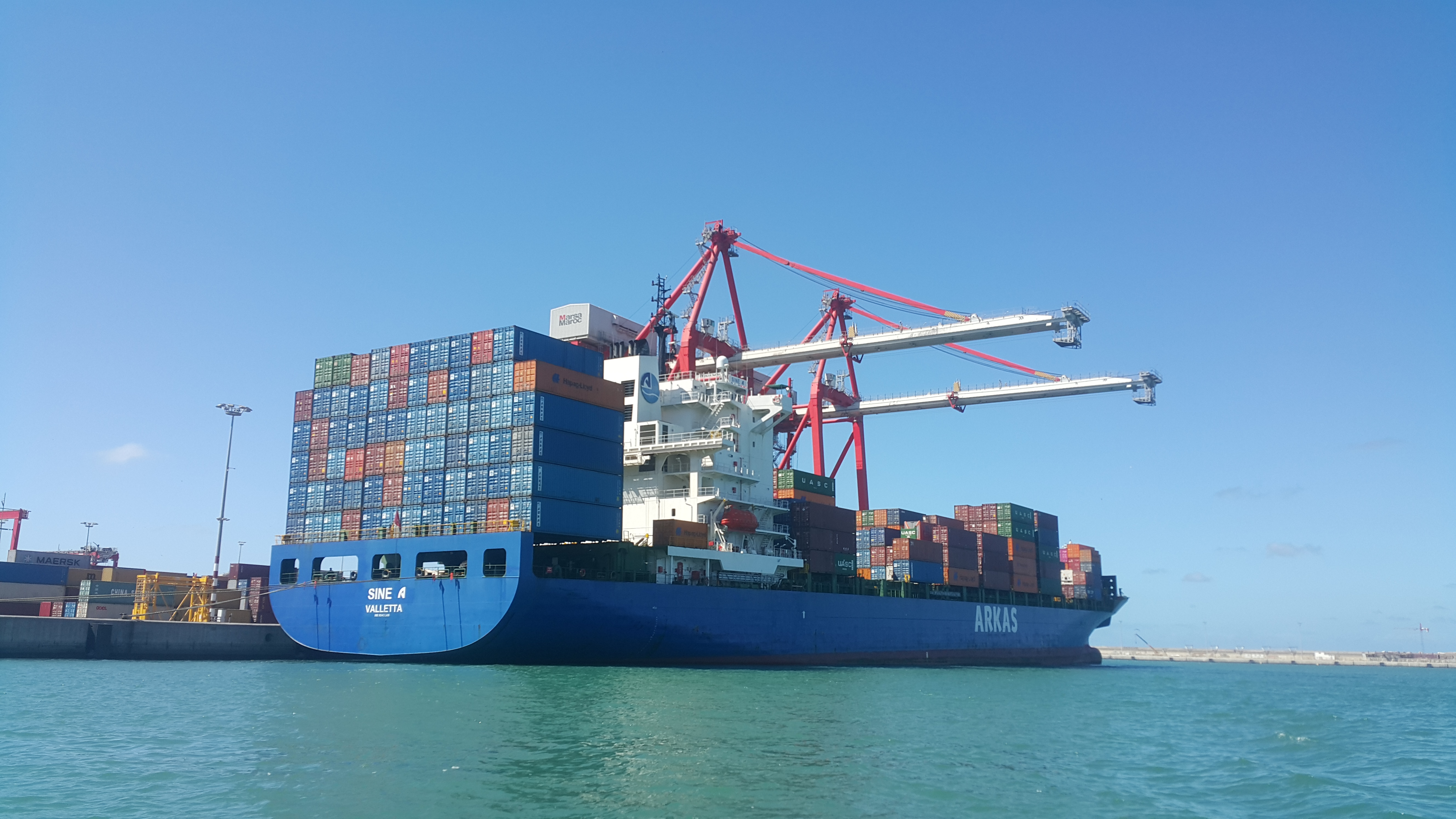
- Company type: private company
- Industry: Transport
- Founded: 1902; 124 years ago
- Headquarters: İzmir, Turkey
- Number of employees: 7,300
- Website: arkasline.com.tr

Arkas Container Transport (Arkas Line) is a Turkish shipping company, founded in 1902.

== Overview ==
The company operates 44 vessels, between owned and chartered.

The fleet includes 40 container ships and 4 bunker barges, employing over 7,300 staff globally, regularly calling ports located in 23 countries.

The main services provided to customers are from Turkey and Europe to the Black Sea, East Mediterranean, West Mediterranean, North Africa and West Africa.

A number of collaboration and partnership agreements are in place with other shipping lines such as China COSCO Shipping, Evergreen Yang Ming, Hapag-Lloyd, Grimaldi Group.

Long-term representation and agency services have been established in Turkey for Lines such as Pacific International Lines, Hamburg Süd, Atlantic Container Line, Ethiopian Shipping Lines.

Since 1989, Arkas also has a logistic division for trucking and rail transport, plus one for air cargo.

== See also ==
- List of largest container shipping companies
- Messina Line
- Ocean Network Express
