= Arka (monument) =

Coordinates: 55°42′38″N 21°8′0″E

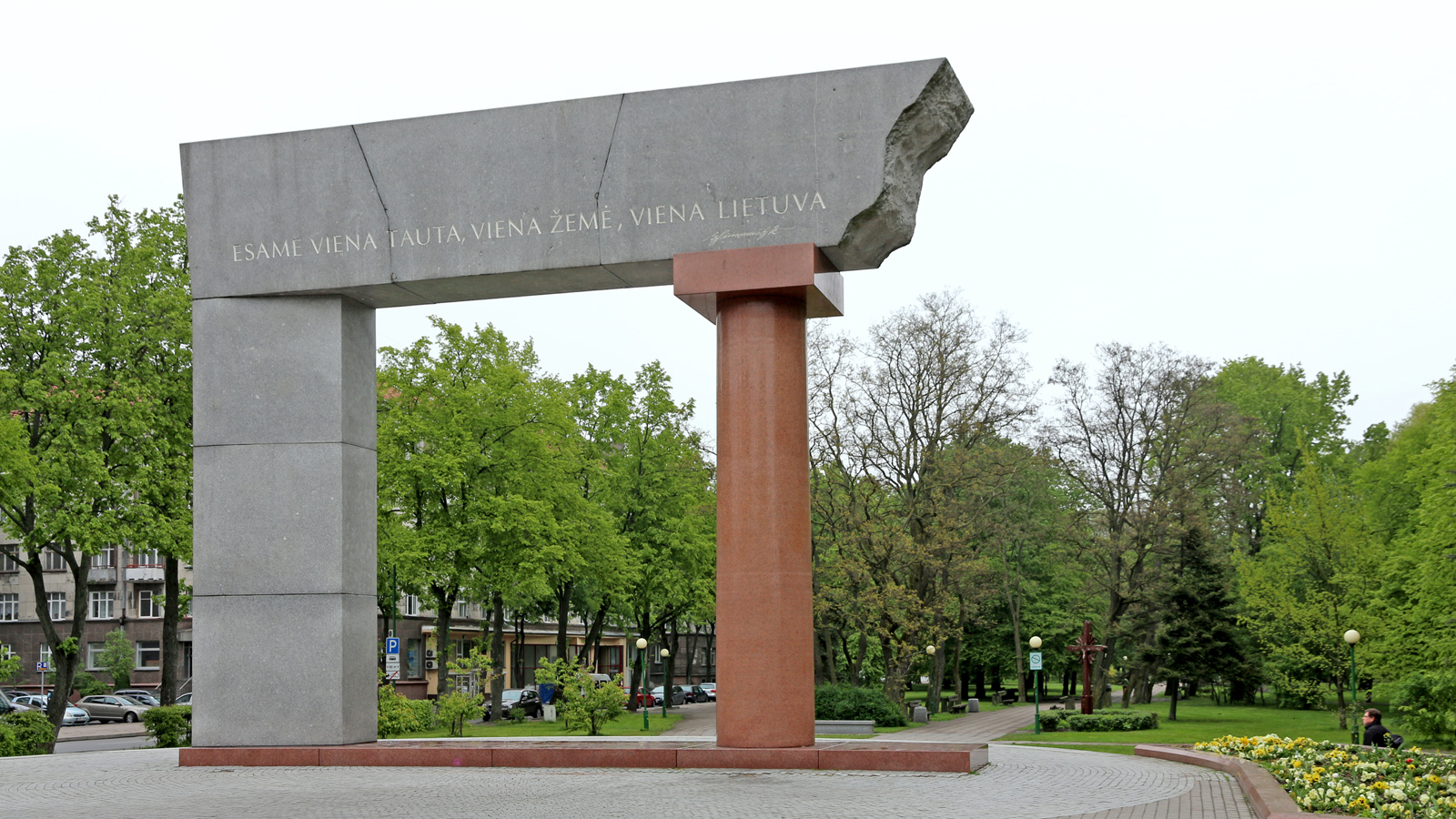
Arka Monument in Klaipėda

Arka (transl. Arch) is a monument in Klaipėda, Lithuania. Unveiled on 8 August 2003, it commemorates the 85-year anniversary of the Act of Tilsit and the 80-year anniversary of the Klaipėda Revolt.

The monument weighs 150 tonnes and reaches 8.5 metres (28 ft) in height. The smaller red column is made from red granite and symbolizes Lithuania Minor and its cultural heritage, while the larger gray column and arch symbolize Lithuania proper. The gray arch on top looks like it has been broken off and stands for the Kaliningrad Oblast, currently part of Russia. Words by writer Ieva Simonaitytė are carved into the monument: "Esame viena tauta, viena žemė, viena Lietuva" (English: We are one nation, one land, one Lithuania).

The monument was created by sculptor Arūnas Sakalauskas, architect Richard Krištapavičius, and engineer Tautvydas Tubys.
