= Arcas, Cuenca =

Arcas
- Municipality
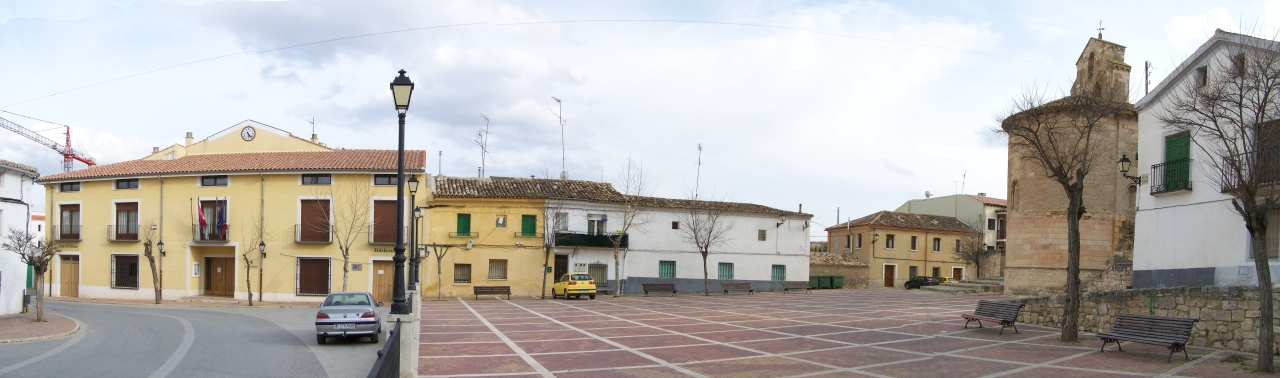

- Coat of arms

- Location within Spain Location within Castilla-La Mancha
- Coordinates: 39°59′23″N 2°06′49″W
- Country: Spain
- Autonomous community: Castile-La Mancha
- Province: Cuenca

Population (2025-01-01)
  - Total: 2,332
- Time zone: UTC+1 (CET)
  - Summer (DST): UTC+2 (CEST)

Arcas is a municipality in Cuenca, Castile-La Mancha, Spain. It had a population of 1,775 as of 2020.
