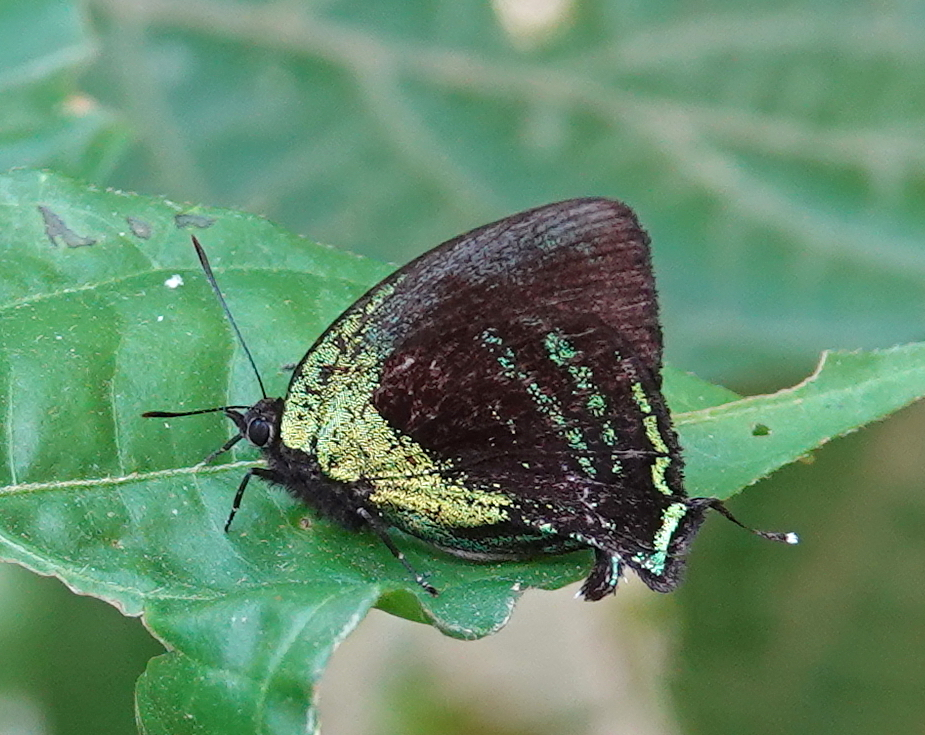
- Lucilda crines, Colombia

Scientific classification
- Domain: Eukaryota
- Kingdom: Animalia
- Phylum: Arthropoda
- Class: Insecta
- Order: Lepidoptera
- Family: Lycaenidae
- Subfamily: Theclinae
- Tribe: Eumaeini
- Genus: Lucilda d'Abrera & Bálint, 2001

= Lucilda =

Genus of butterflies

Lucilda is a genus of hairstreaks in the butterfly family Lycaenidae. There are about five described species in Lucilda, found in Central and South America.

== Species ==
- Lucilda boliboyerus (Bálint & Wojtusiak, 2006) southern Peru and Bolivia
- Lucilda crines (H.H. Druce, 1907) - Costa Rica to western Ecuador
- Lucilda dabrerus (Bálint, 2002) - Ecuador
- Lucilda danaus (C. Felder & R. Felder, 1865) - Venezuela to eastern Peru
- Lucilda margaritacea (Draudt, 1919) - western Colombia and Ecuador
