= Arca-Swiss =

Premium photography equipment maker originally from Switzerland

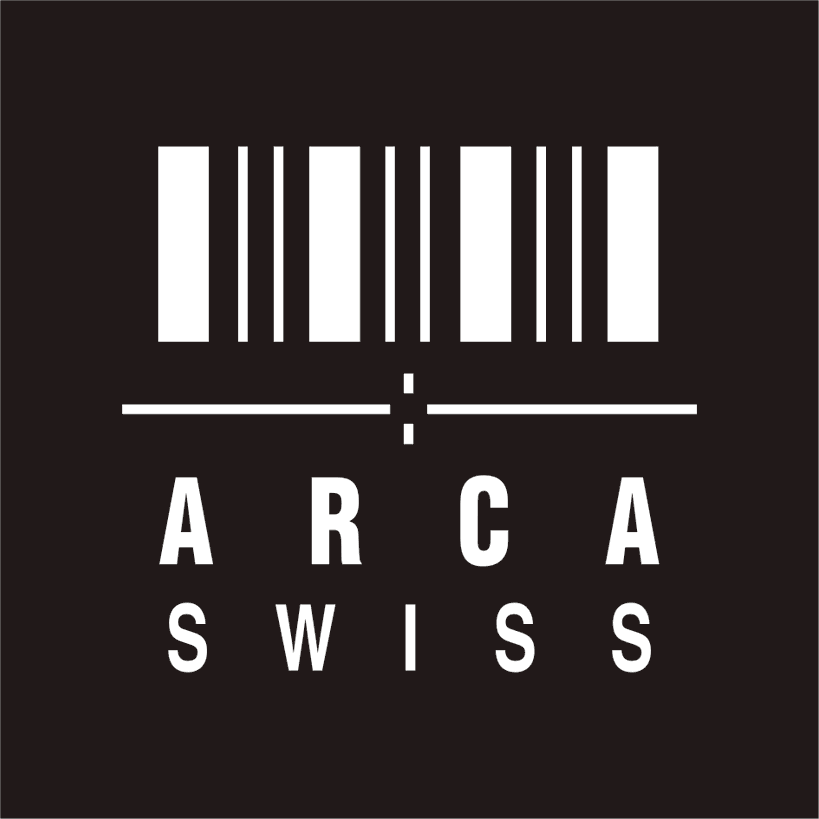
- Native name: Arca-Swiss Phototechnik AG
- Formerly: Alfred Oschwald & Co.
- Company type: Private
- Industry: View cameras, Photographical equipment
- Founded: 1926; 99 years ago
- Founder: Alfred Oschwald
- Number of locations: 3 (2025)
- Key people: Anna Maria Vogt-Koch; Marianne Vogt-Willi; Martin Vogt
- Owner: Vogt family

Arca-Swiss (officially ARCA-SWISS Phototechnik AG) is a Swiss multinational corporation specializing in view cameras as well as photographic and optical equipment. Since 1999, the company has its headquarters, Arca-Swiss International, in Besançon, France and also operates a U.S. subsidiary in Tempe, Arizona.
