= Arca (restaurant) =

Restaurant in Tulum, Quintana Roo

Coordinates: 20°08′58″N 87°27′34″W

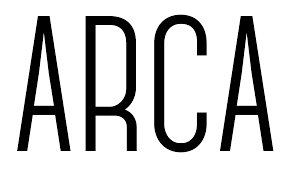

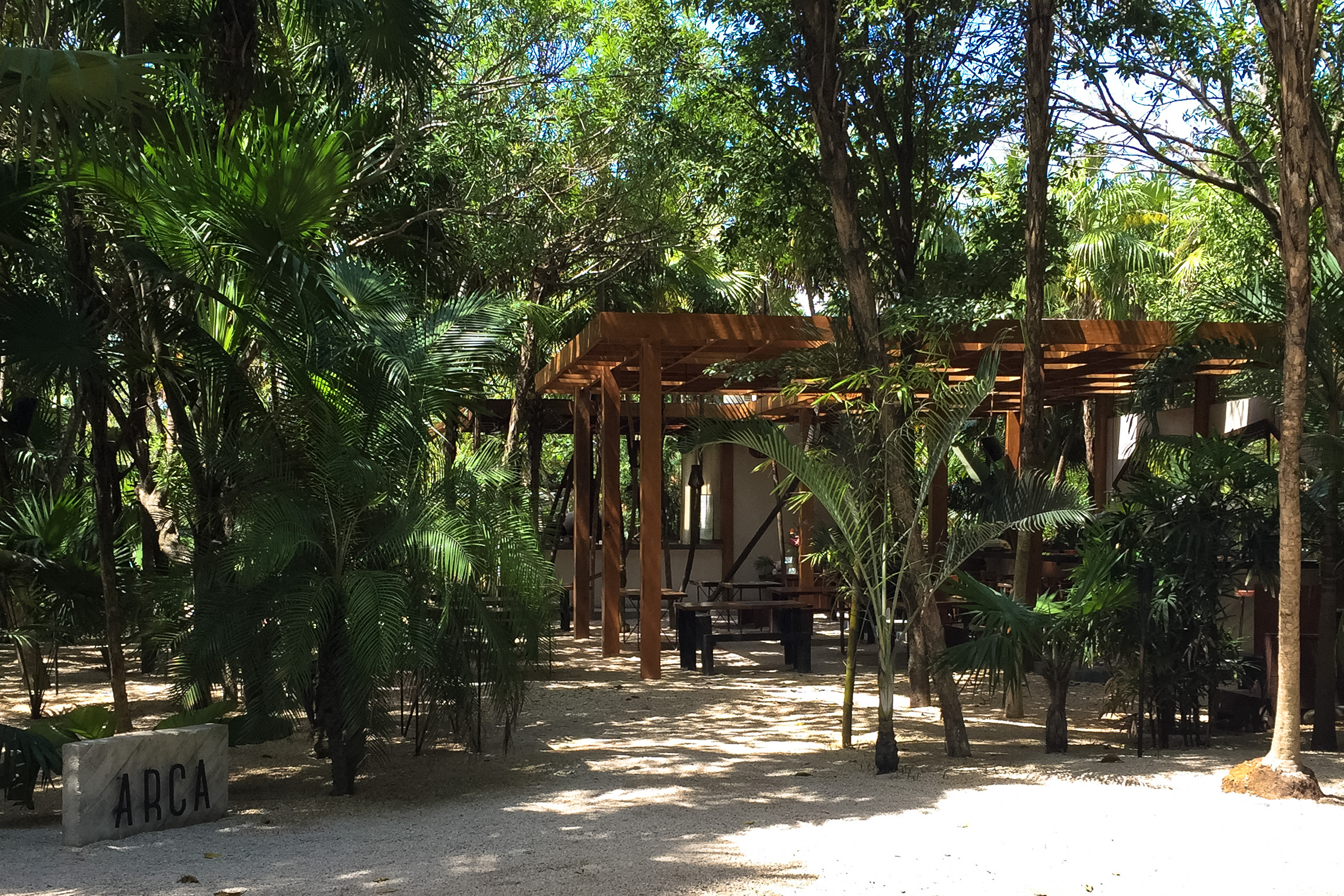
- The restaurant in 2017
- Interactive map of Arca

Restaurant information
- Established: 2015
- Owner: José Luis Hinostroza
- Location: Tulum, Mexico
- Website: arcatulum.com

Arca is a contemporary fine dining Mexican restaurant and bar in Tulum, Quintana Roo. It was opened in 2015 by the chef José Luis Hinostroza. Arca ranked 67 (2025) and 87 (2026) at the extended list of the World's 50 Best Restaurants. Its bar ranked 27 in the World's 50 Best Bars in 2025.
