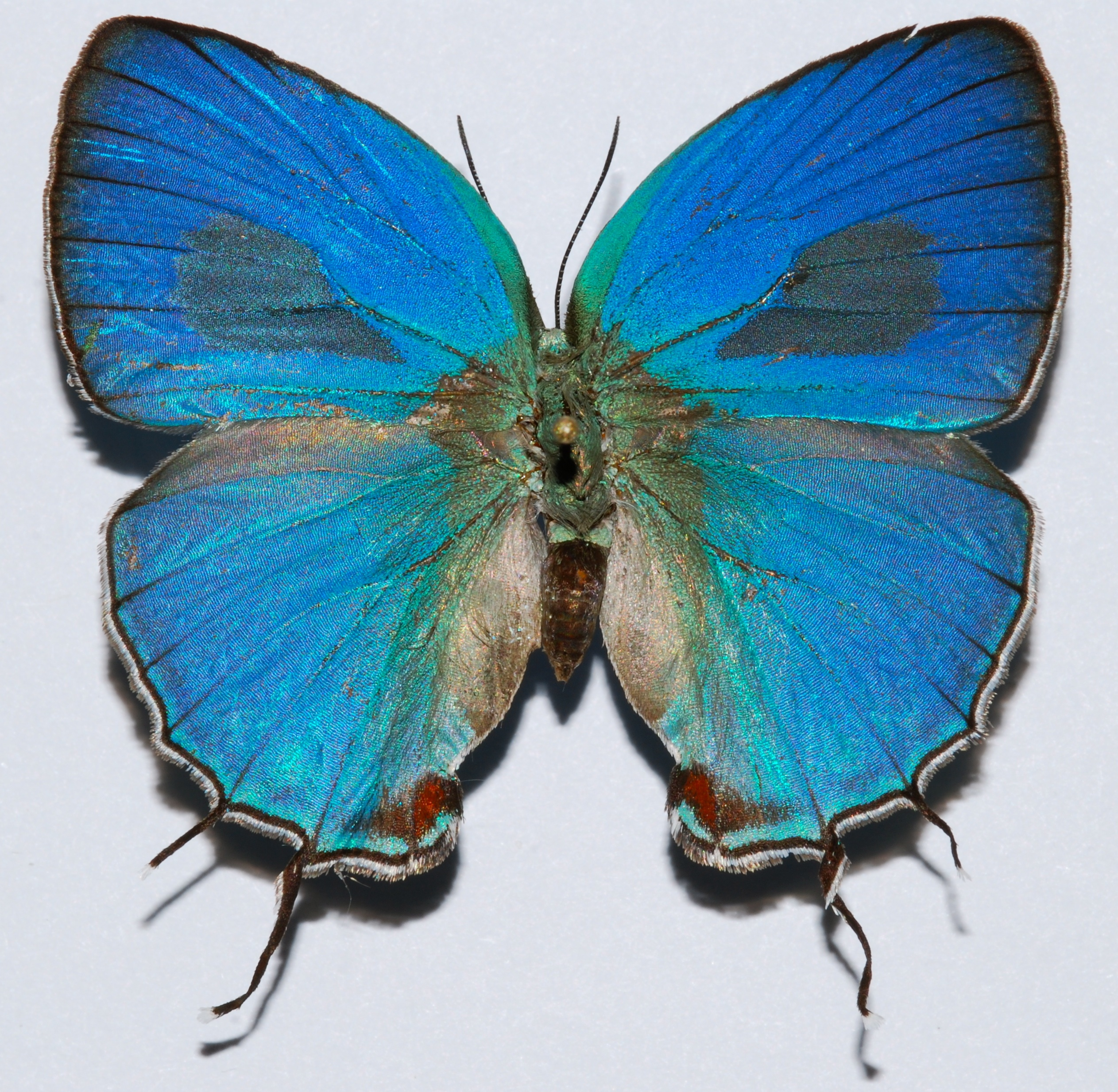
- Evenus floralia

Scientific classification
- Domain: Eukaryota
- Kingdom: Animalia
- Phylum: Arthropoda
- Class: Insecta
- Order: Lepidoptera
- Family: Lycaenidae
- Subfamily: Theclinae
- Tribe: Eumaeini
- Genus: Evenus; Hübner, [1819]

Type species
- Papilio endymion Fabricius, 1781

Synonyms
- Poetukulunma Brévignon, 2002

= Evenus (butterfly) =

Butterfly genus in family Lycaenidae

Evenus is a butterfly genus in the family Lycaenidae, with species ranging from North to South America.

== Species list ==
- Evenus regalis (Cramer, 1775) – type species
- Evenus coronata (Hewitson, 1865)– crowned hairstreak
- Evenus gabriela (Cramer, 1775)
- Evenus batesii (Hewitson, 1865)
- Evenus candidus (Druce, 1907)
- Evenus sponsa (Möschler, 1877)
- Evenus sumptuosa (Druce, 1907)
- Evenus tagyra (Hewitson, 1865)
- Evenus floralia (Druce, 1907)
- Evenus temathea (Hewitson, 1865)
- Evenus satyroides (Hewitson, 1865)
- Evenus latreillii (Hewitson, 1865)
- Evenus felix (Neild and Balint, 2014)
