= List of lycaenid genera: A =

The large butterfly family Lycaenidae contains the following genera starting with the letter A:

- Acrodipsas
- Actizera
- Acupicta
- Acytolepis
- Aethiopana
- Afarsia
- Agriades
- Ahmetia
- Alaena
- Alciphronia
- Allosmaitia
- Allotinus
- Aloeides
- Alpherakya
- Amblopala
- Amblypodia
- Ancema
- Anthene
- Antigius
- Apangea
- Aphnaeus
- Apophrys
- Apporasa
- Apuecla
- Araragi
- Arases
- Arawacus
- Arcas
- Argyraspodes
- Argyrocheila
- Arhopala
- Aricia
- Arletta
- Artipe
- Artopoetes
- Arumecla
- Arzecla
- Aslauga
- Athamanthia
- Atlides
- Aubergina
- Austrozephyrus
- Axiocerses
- Azanus
