= Arletta =

Scientific classification
- Kingdom: Animalia
- Phylum: Arthropoda
- Class: Insecta
- Order: Lepidoptera
- Family: Lycaenidae
- Genus: Arletta

Butterfly genus in family Lycaenidae

Arletta is a genus of butterflies in the family Lycaenidae and subgenus of Oreolyce. The type species is Arletta vardhana, now in the Oreolyce genus.
