= Actizera stellata =

Red-clover blue

Scientific classification
- Kingdom: Animalia
- Phylum: Arthropoda
- Clade: Pancrustacea
- Class: Insecta
- Order: Lepidoptera
- Family: Lycaenidae
- Genus: Actizera
- Species: A. stellata

Binomial name
- Actizera stellata (Trimen, 1883)

Synonyms
- Lycaena stellata Trimen, 1883

Species of butterfly

Actizera stellata, the red-clover blue, is a butterfly of the family Lycaenidae. It is found in South Africa, Ethiopia, southern Sudan, Kenya, Uganda, Zaire, Tanzania and northern Malawi. In South Africa it is found in the East Cape and the southern part of the Orange Free State.

The wingspan is 13–18 mm for males and 15–19 mm for females. Adults are on wing from January to May, with a peak from January to February. There is one extended generation per year.

The larvae feed on Trifolium africanum.
