= Actizera drucei =

Scientific classification
- Domain: Eukaryota
- Kingdom: Animalia
- Phylum: Arthropoda
- Class: Insecta
- Order: Lepidoptera
- Family: Lycaenidae
- Genus: Actizera
- Species: A. drucei

Binomial name
- Actizera drucei (Bethune-Baker, 1906)

Synonyms
- Zizera drucei Bethune-Baker, 1906; Actizera lucida drucei

Species of butterfly

Actizera drucei is a butterfly in the family Lycaenidae. It is found on Madagascar. The habitat consists of transformed grassland.
