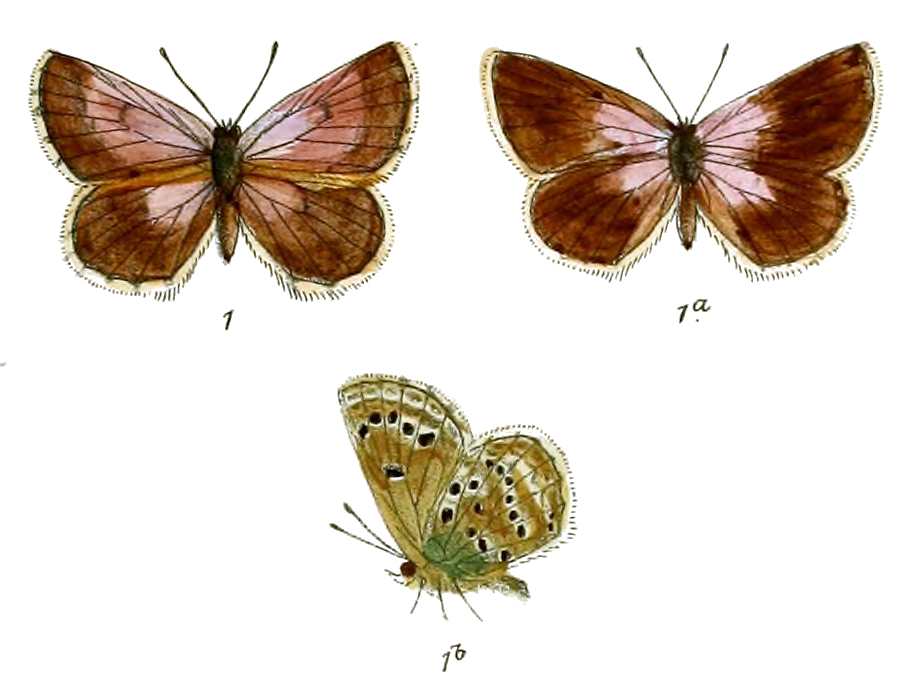

Scientific classification
- Kingdom: Animalia
- Phylum: Arthropoda
- Class: Insecta
- Order: Lepidoptera
- Family: Lycaenidae
- Genus: Alpherakya
- Species: A. devanica

Binomial name
- Alpherakya devanica (Moore, [1875])

Synonyms
- Polyommatus devanica Moore, [1875]; Tiora devanica (Moore, [1875])

= Alpherakya devanica =

Species of butterfly

Alpherakya devanica is a species of Lycaenid butterfly found in the Pamirs, Hindu Kush, Karakorum and Tajikistan.

== Description ==
Male upperside: dusky brown with more or less of a dense irroration of blue scales that spreads from the bases of the wings outwards towards the termen. The amount of this blue scaling is irregular and variable; on the forewing it never extends up to the apex or terminal margin; on the hindwing never further than the disc. Forewing: a short transverse line or elongate spot on the discocellulars and a slender black anteciliary line. Hindwing: without markings; in a few specimens traces of one or two subterminal dusky spots near the tornal angle; a slender black anteciliary line as on the forewing. Cilia of both forewings and hindwings white. Underside: greyish brown; bases of both forewings and hindwings irrorated with blue scales. Forewing: with the following black, white-encircled spots: a transverse spot on the discocellulars, a curved series of five, sometimes six, discal spots and a subterminal transverse complete series of smaller spots, the spots in the latter series dusky black, paler than those of the discal series; bordering the white edging to the subterminal series of spots on the inner side, is another obscure transverse row of dusky spots that are not encircled with white; lastly, a prominent anteciliary black line. Hindwing: a subbasal transverse series of four spots, an outwardly angulated discal series of eight spots, the posterior two geminate, followed by a strongly curved post-discal series of slender lunules, a subterminal series of smaller spots and an anteciliary slender line, black, each spot is encircled with white; discocellulars marked by a large, irregular, white spot, that in some specimens is transversely traversed by a short slender black line; the outer white edging to the middle spots of the discal series is produced irregularly outwards and forms a small patch, and the postdiscal series of lunules is bordered on the outer side by pale ochraceous red. Cilia of both forewings and hindwings white, alternated with fuscous brown at the apices of the veins. Antennae black, the shafts ringed with white, head and thorax with bluish-grey pubescence, abdomen dusky black; beneath: palpi, thorax and abdomen white.

Female upperside uniform dark brown with in certain lights a satiny lustre. Forewing: the discocellular transverse black spot obscure, seen more by transparency from the underside than marked by actual scaling. Forewings and hindwings: cilia prominent, snow-white. Underside similar to the underside in the male, the ground colour a shade darker. Antennae, palpi, thorax and abdomen beneath as in the male; on the upperside, the head, thorax and abdomen black, clothed more or less with brownish pubescence.
