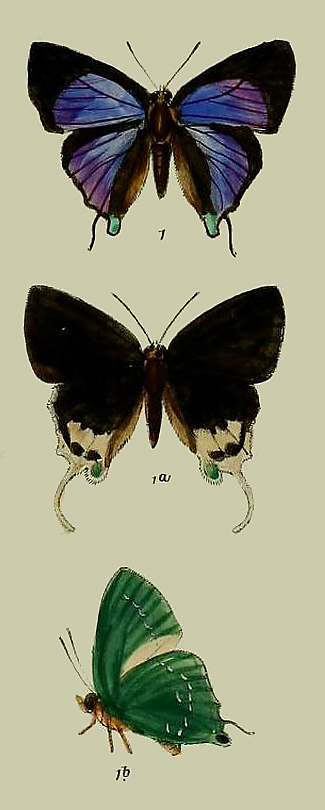

Scientific classification
- Kingdom: Animalia
- Phylum: Arthropoda
- Class: Insecta
- Order: Lepidoptera
- Family: Lycaenidae
- Genus: Artipe
- Species: A. eryx

Binomial name
- Artipe eryx (Linnaeus, 1771)

Synonyms
- Papilio eryx Linnaeus, 1771; Lehera eryx; Deudorix eryx; Lehera skinneri Wood-Mason & de Nicéville, [1887]; Papilio amyntor Herbst, 1804 (preocc. Cramer, 1775); Lehera eryx agis Fruhstorfer, 1914; Lehera eryx okinawana Matsumura, 1919; Lehera eryx horiella Matsumura, 1929

= Artipe eryx =

Green flash

Species of butterfly

Artipe eryx, the green flash, is a species of butterfly belonging to the lycaenid family described by Carl Linnaeus in 1771. It is found in the Indomalayan realm (North India, Burma, China, Indochina, Peninsular Malaya, Taiwan, Borneo, Sulawesi, Japan).

The larvae feed on the fruits of Gardenia species, including Gardenia jasminoides and Gardenia florida.

== Subspecies ==
- Artipe eryx eryx (northern India, Burma, Thailand to Indo China, southern China)
- Artipe eryx agis (Fruhstorfer, 1914) (southern Borneo)
- Artipe eryx okinawana (Matsumura, 1919) (Japan)
- Artipe eryx horiella (Matsumura, 1929) (Taiwan)
- Artipe eryx alax Eliot, 1956 (southern Sulawesi)
- Artipe eryx excellens Eliot, 1959 (Peninsular Malaysia)

== Gallery ==
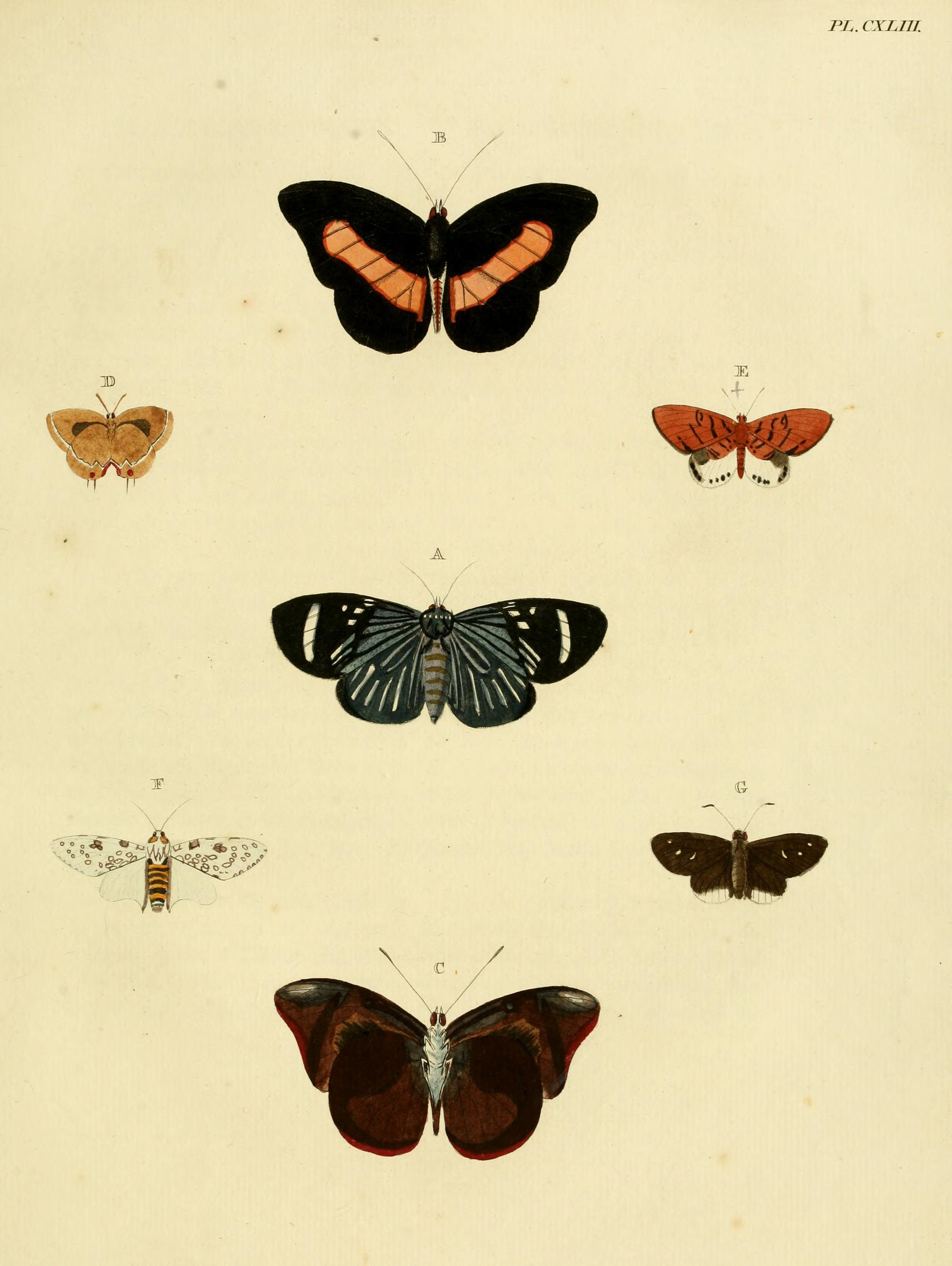

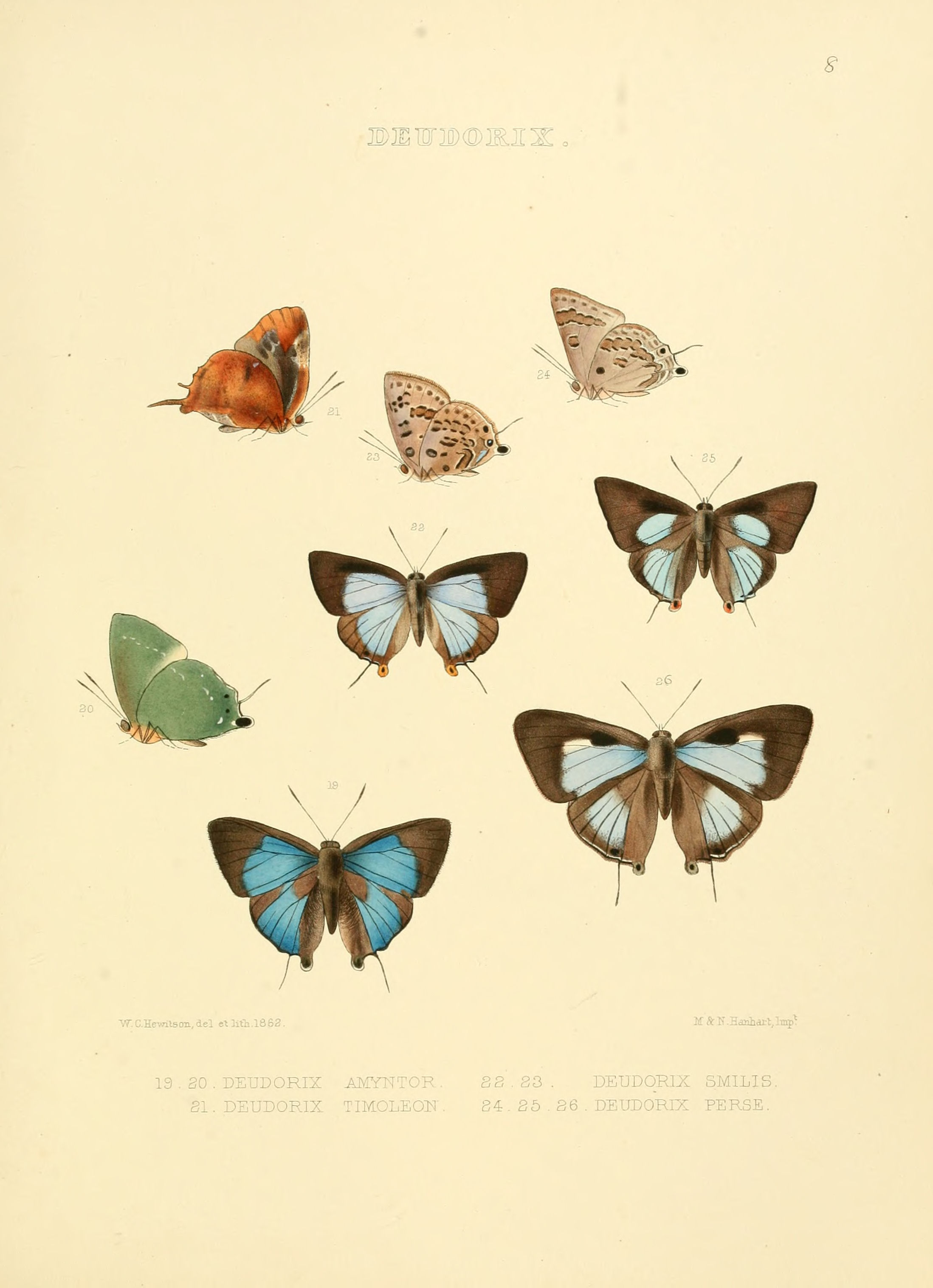

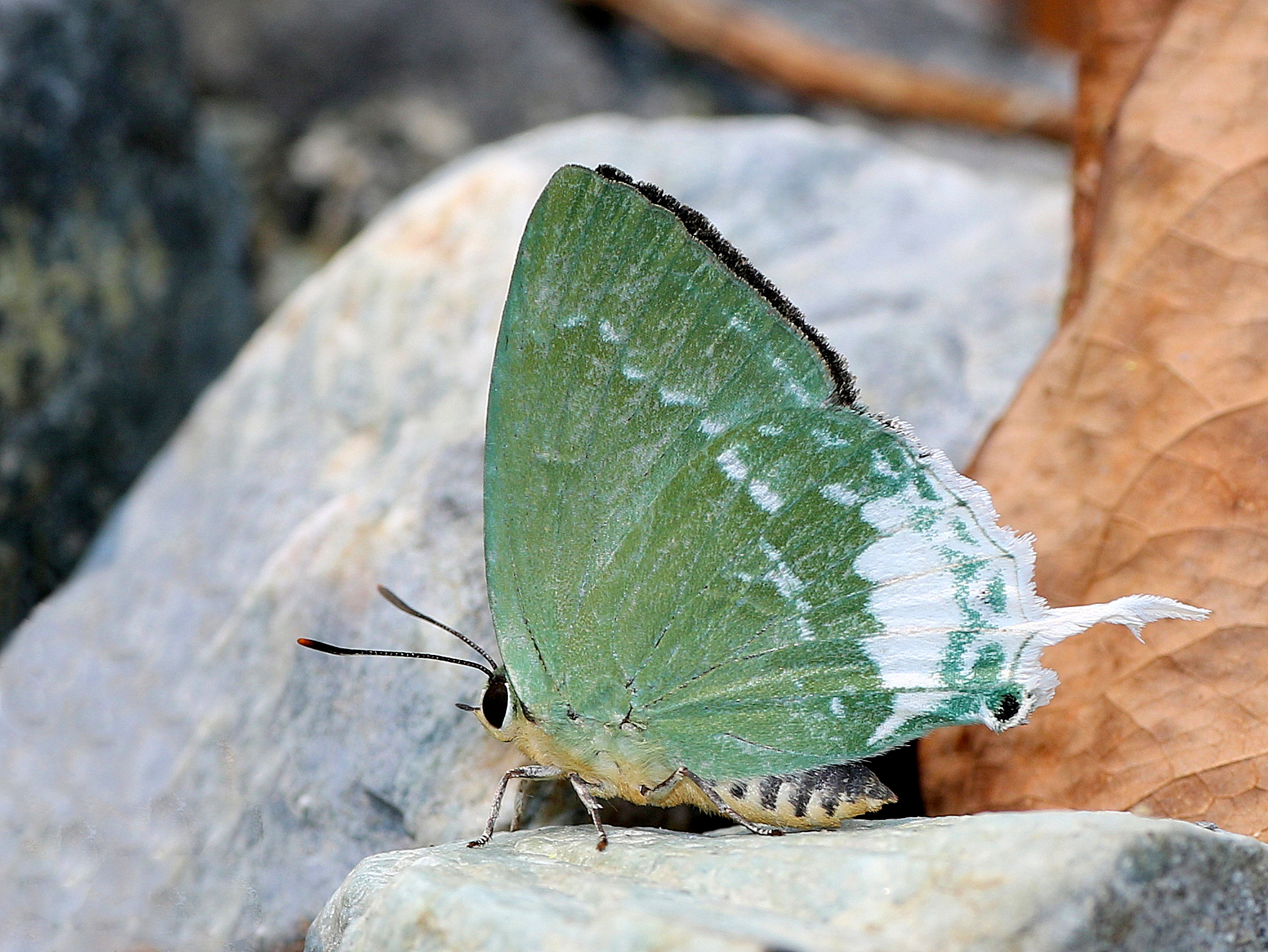
