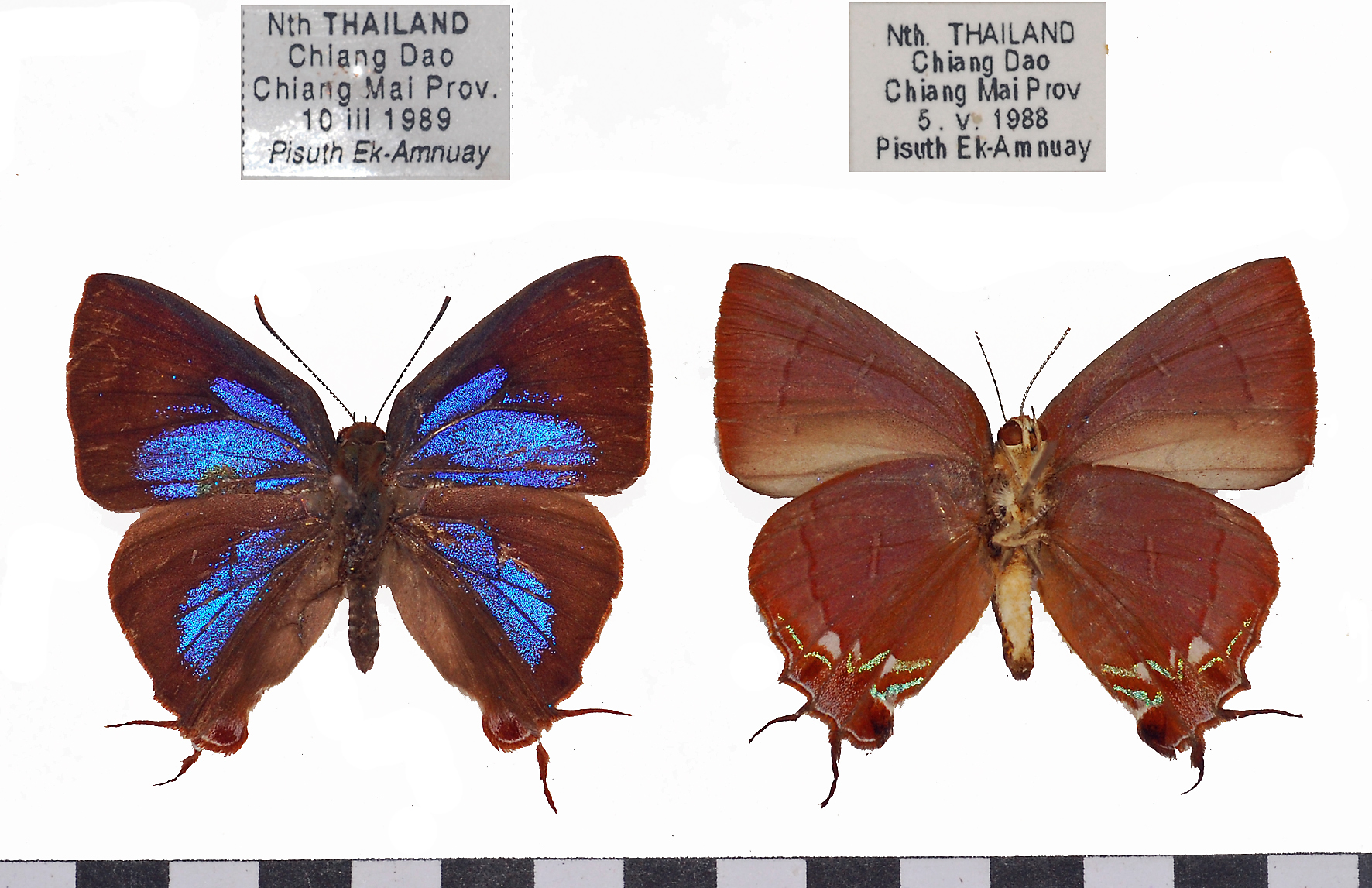
- Remelana jangala from Thailand

Scientific classification
- Domain: Eukaryota
- Kingdom: Animalia
- Phylum: Arthropoda
- Class: Insecta
- Order: Lepidoptera
- Family: Lycaenidae
- Tribe: Remelanini
- Genus: Remelana; Moore, 1884

= Remelana =

Butterfly genus in family Lycaenidae

Remelana is a genus of butterflies in the family Lycaenidae. The species of this genus are found in the Indomalayan realm. Remelana was erected by Frederic Moore in 1884.

== Species ==
- Remelana davisi Jumalon, 1975
- Remelana jangala (Horsfield, [1829]) - chocolate royal
