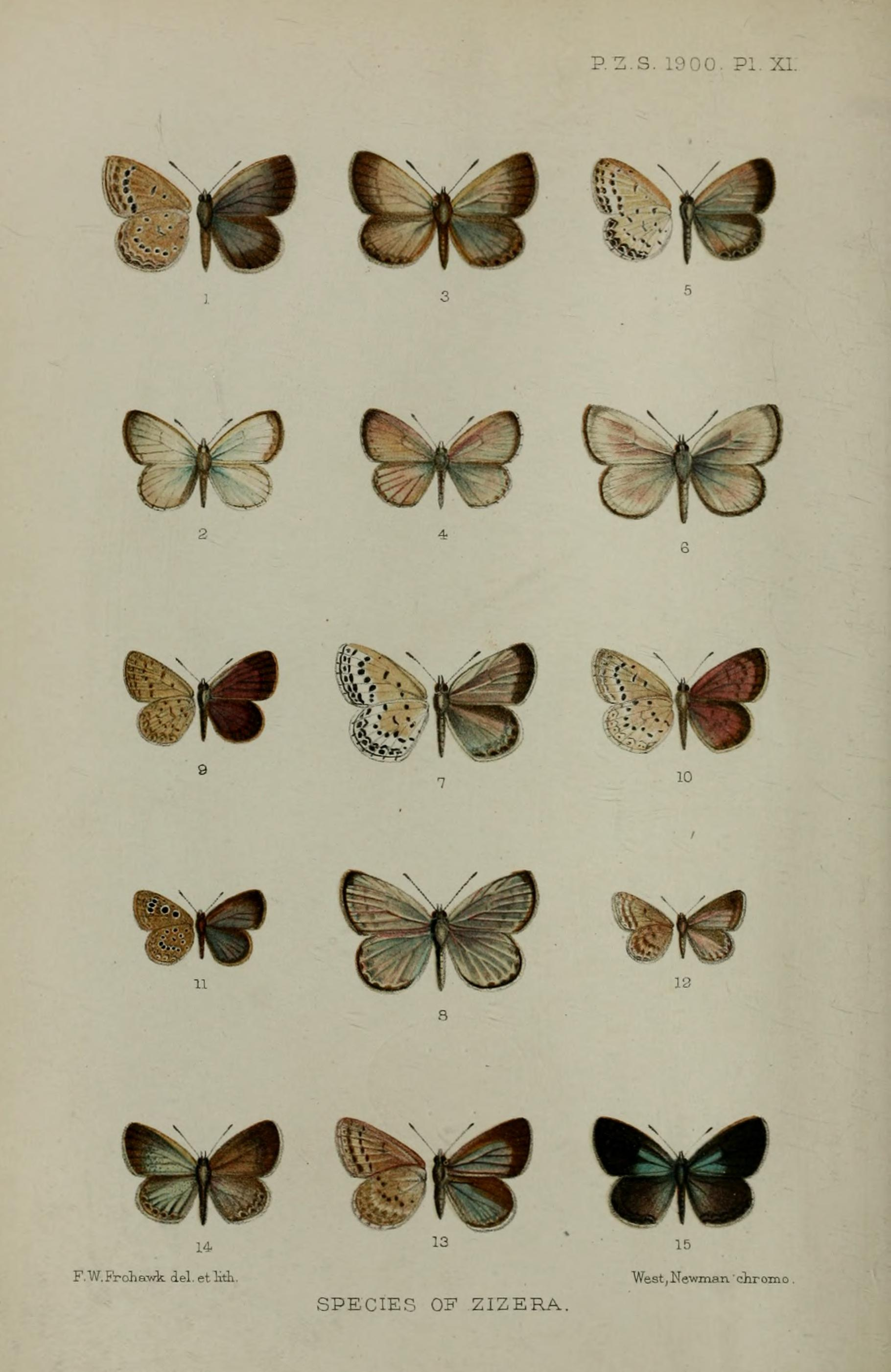
- Actizera atrigemmata figure 11

Scientific classification
- Domain: Eukaryota
- Kingdom: Animalia
- Phylum: Arthropoda
- Class: Insecta
- Order: Lepidoptera
- Family: Lycaenidae
- Genus: Actizera
- Species: A. atrigemmata

Binomial name
- Actizera atrigemmata (Butler, 1878)

Synonyms
- Lycaena atrigemmata Butler, 1878

= Actizera atrigemmata =

Species of butterfly

Actizera atrigemmata is a butterfly in the family Lycaenidae. It is found on Madagascar. The habitat consists of transformed grassland.
