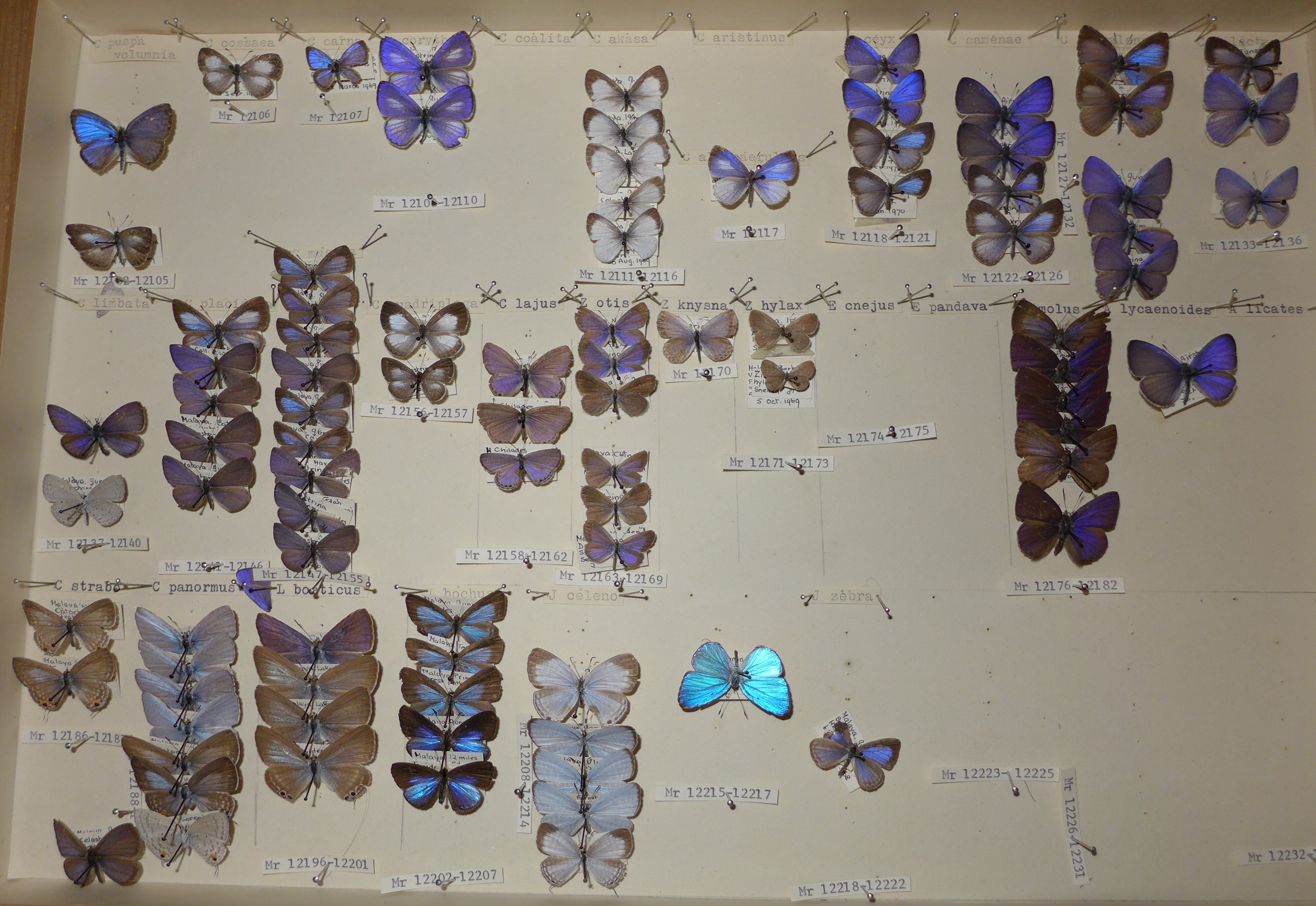
- Oreolyce quadriplaga in a collection of Lycaenidae from Malaya

Scientific classification
- Kingdom: Animalia
- Phylum: Arthropoda
- Clade: Pancrustacea
- Class: Insecta
- Order: Lepidoptera
- Family: Lycaenidae
- Genus: Oreolyce
- Species: O. quadriplaga

Binomial name
- Oreolyce quadriplaga (Snellen, 1892)

= Oreolyce quadriplaga =

Naga hedge blue

Species of butterfly

Oreolyce quadriplaga, the Naga hedge blue, is a small butterfly found in the Indomalayan realm that belongs to the lycaenids or blues family.

== Subspecies ==
- O. q. quadriplaga Java, Malaya. India
- O. q. aphala (Fruhstorfer, 1910) East Java
- O. q. nearcha (Fruhstorfer, 1917)

== Taxonomy ==
The butterfly was earlier known as Lycaenopsis quadriplaga (Tytler).

== Range ==
It is found in Nagaland in India, Java and Malaya.

== See also ==
- List of butterflies of India (Lycaenidae)
