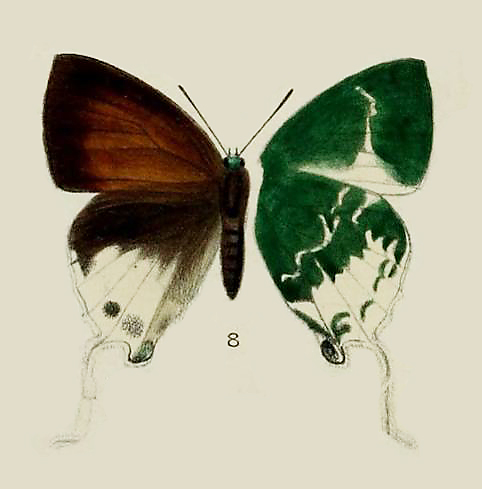

Scientific classification
- Kingdom: Animalia
- Phylum: Arthropoda
- Clade: Pancrustacea
- Class: Insecta
- Order: Lepidoptera
- Family: Lycaenidae
- Genus: Artipe
- Species: A. anna

Binomial name
- Artipe anna (H. H. Druce, 1896).

Synonyms
- Lehera anna Druce, 1896; Lehera anna fulva Moulton, 1911

= Artipe anna =

Species of butterfly

Artipe anna is a species of butterfly belonging to the lycaenid family described by Hamilton Herbert Druce in 1896. It is found in Southeast Asia (Borneo, Peninsular Malaya, Sumatra) .

== Subspecies ==
- Artipe anna anna (Borneo, Peninsular Malaya, possibly Sumatra)
- Artipe anna fulva (Moulton, 1911) (Sarawak)
