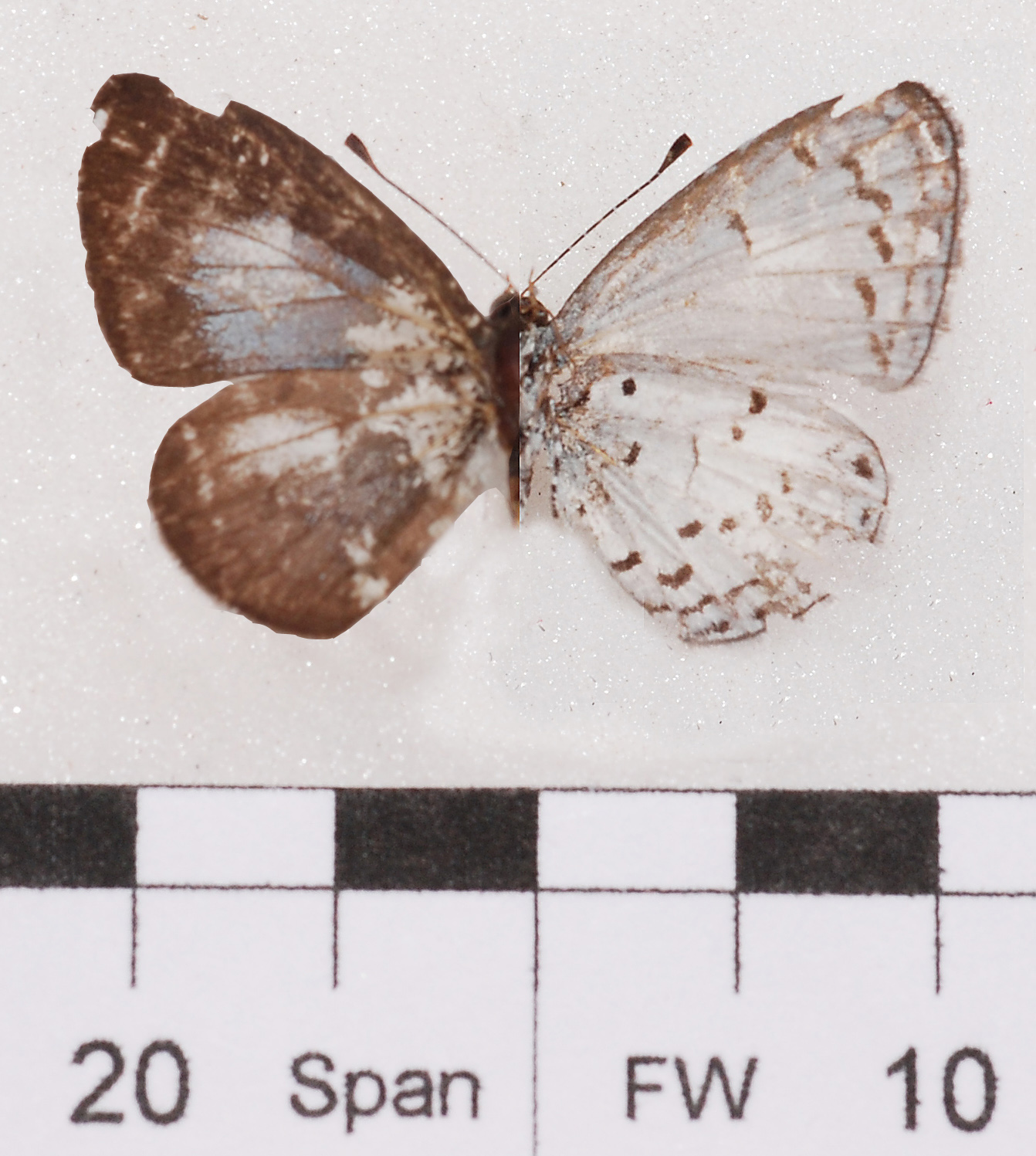

Scientific classification
- Kingdom: Animalia
- Phylum: Arthropoda
- Clade: Pancrustacea
- Class: Insecta
- Order: Lepidoptera
- Family: Lycaenidae
- Genus: Oreolyce
- Species: O. archena

Binomial name
- Oreolyce archena (Corbet, 1940)

Synonyms
- Celastrina archena Corbet, 1940

= Oreolyce archena =

Species of butterfly

Oreolyce archena is a butterfly in the family Lycaenidae. It was described by Alexander Steven Corbet in 1940. It is found in the Indomalayan realm.

== Subspecies ==
- Oreolyce archena archena (Malaysia)
- Oreolyce archena boultoides Eliot & Kawazoé, 1983 (Sumatra)
