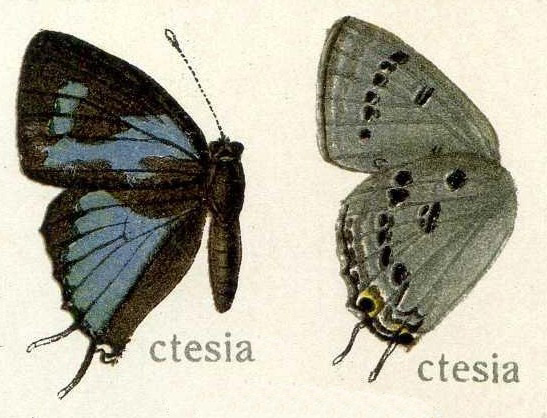

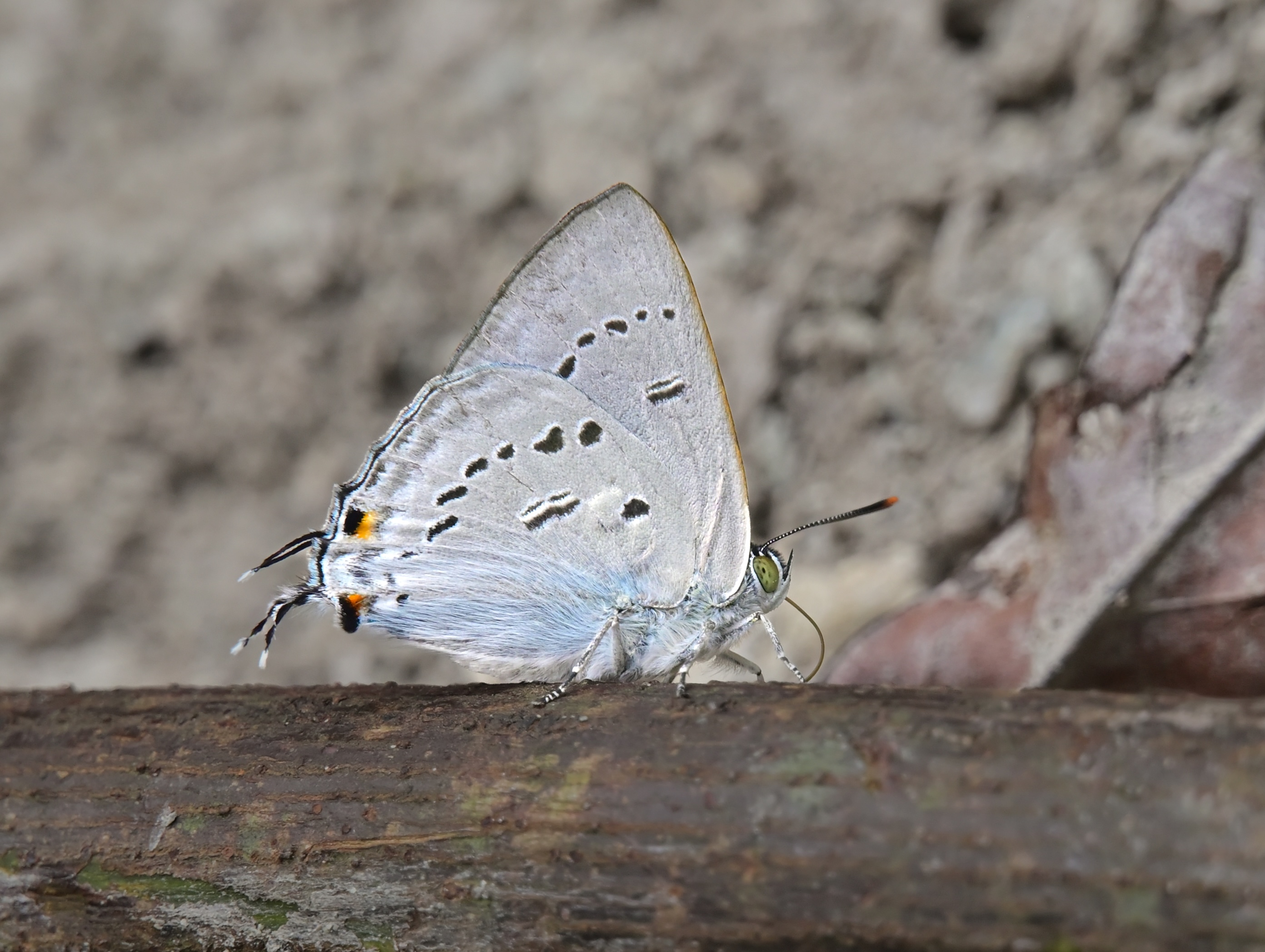

Scientific classification
- Kingdom: Animalia
- Phylum: Arthropoda
- Class: Insecta
- Order: Lepidoptera
- Family: Lycaenidae
- Genus: Ancema
- Species: A. ctesia

Binomial name
- Ancema ctesia (Hewitson, 1865)

Synonyms
- Camena ctesia Hewitson, 1865; Dacalana ctesia; Camema ctesia agalla Fruhstorfer, 1912; Camena ctesia cakravasti Fruhstorfer, 1909; Camena ctesia cakravasti Fruhstorfer, 1909

= Ancema ctesia =

Bi-spot royal

Species of butterfly

Ancema ctesia, the bi-spot royal, is a species of blue butterfly (Lycaenidae) found in Pakistan and India.

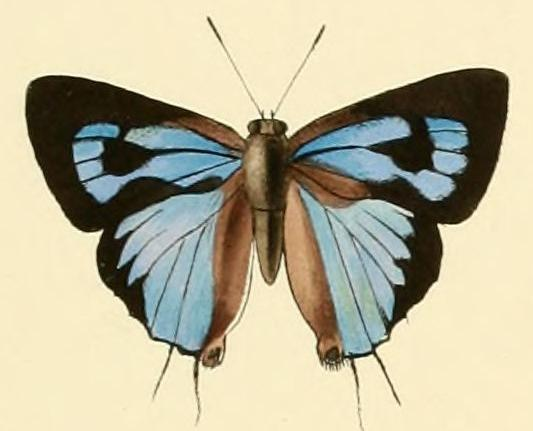

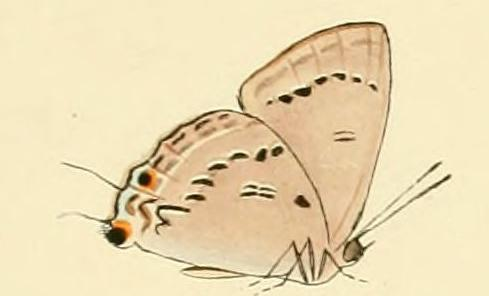

The larvae feed on Viscum articulatum.

== Subspecies ==
The following subspecies are recognised:

- Ancema ctesia ctesia (Sikkim, Assam, Thailand, Peninsular Malaya, possibly Bhutan and Burma)
- Ancema ctesia agalla (Fruhstorfer, 1912) (Thailand, Laos, southern Yunnan, Sichuan)
- Ancema ctesia cakravasti (Fruhstorfer, 1909) (Taiwan)
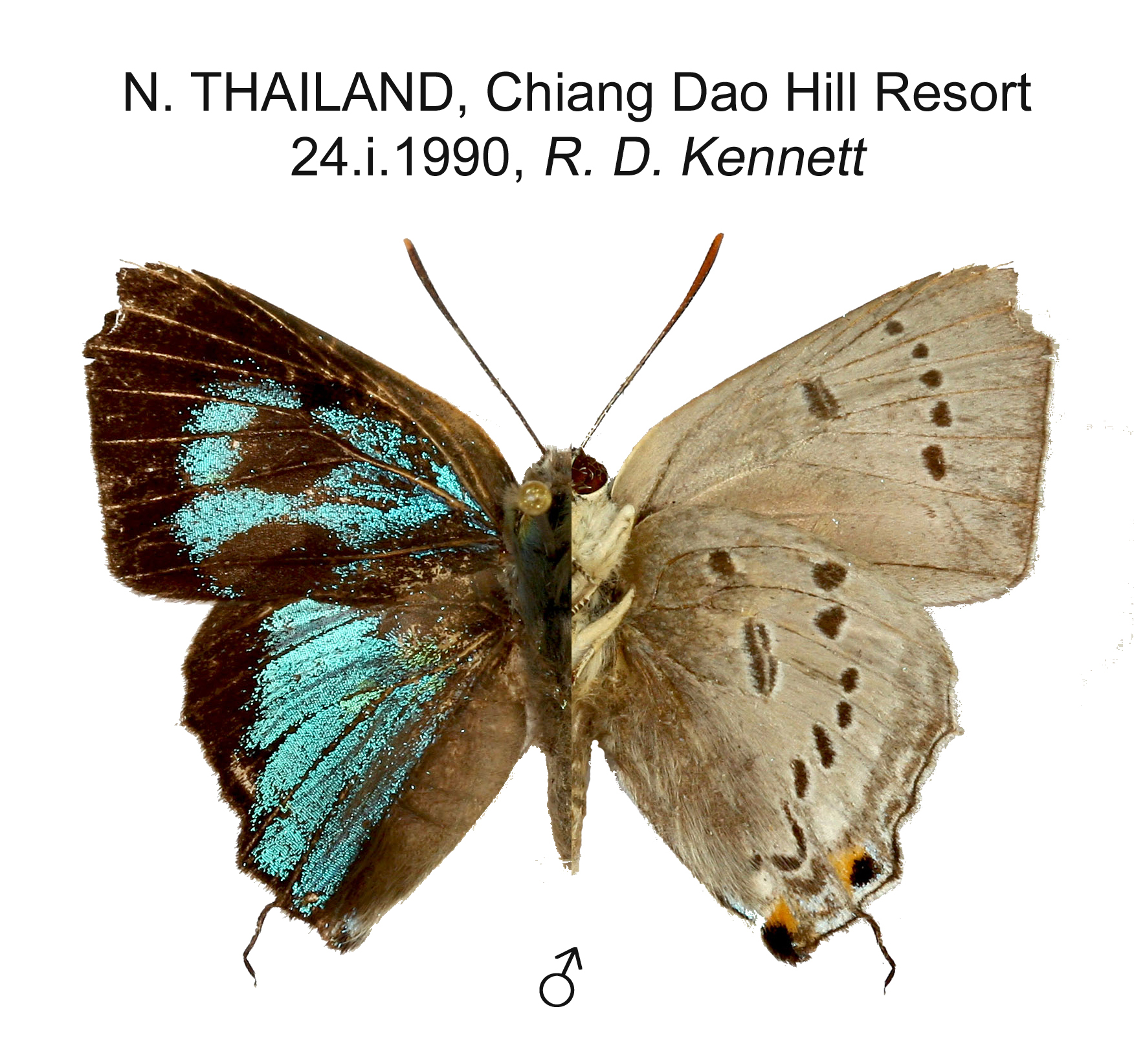
male Thailand

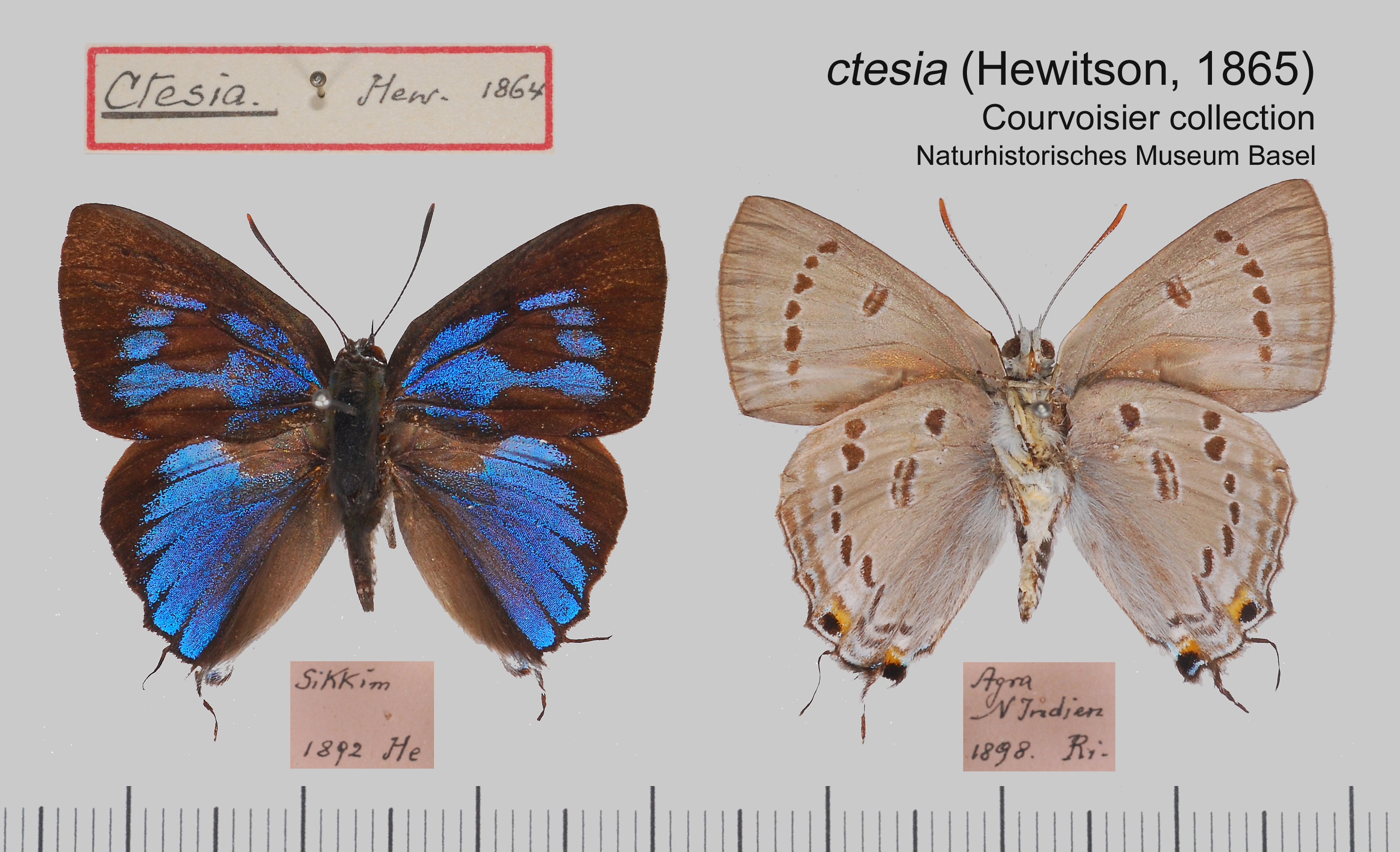
male India Courvoisier collection

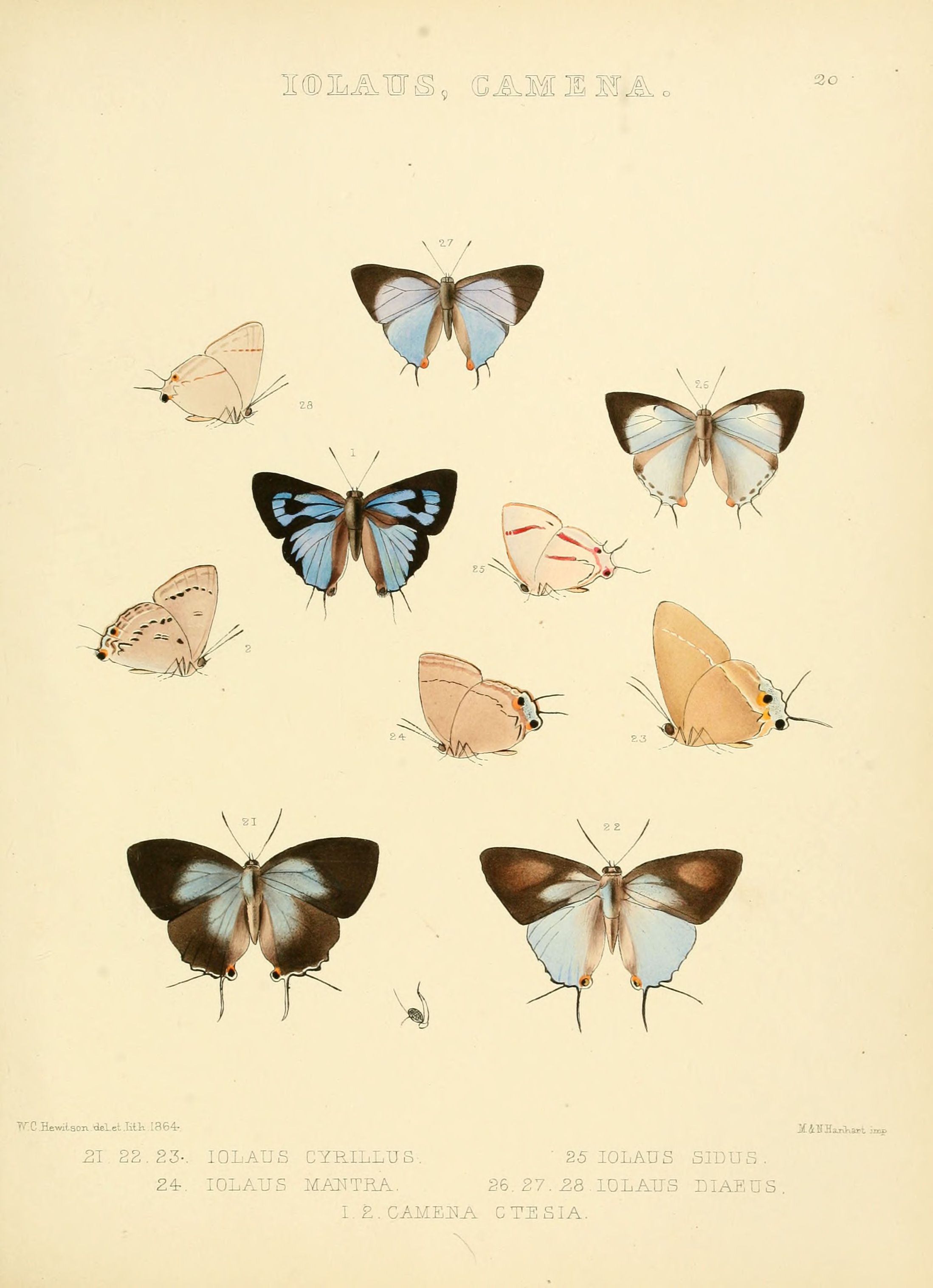
Illustrations of diurnal Lepidoptera Plate 20
