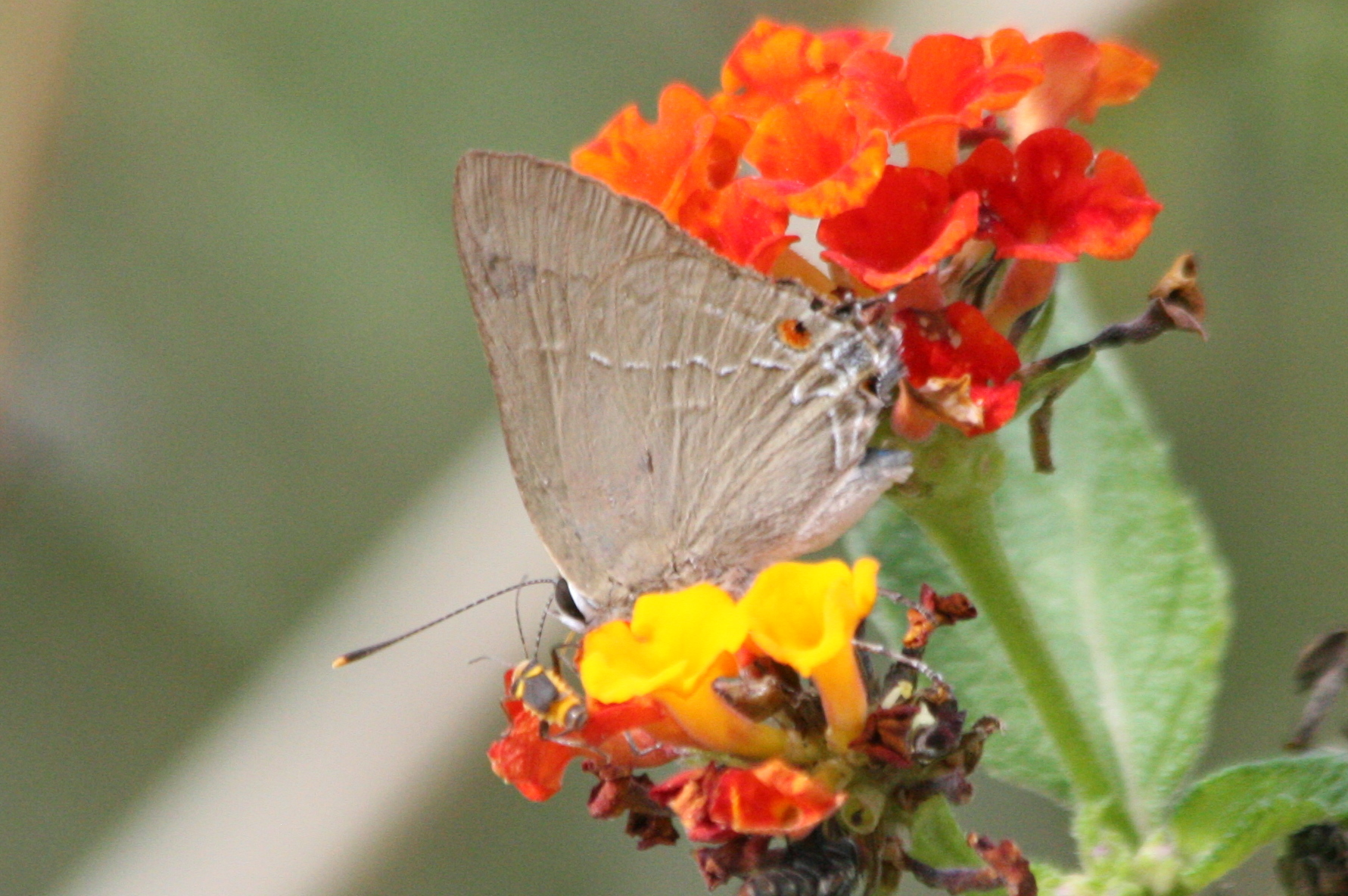

Scientific classification
- Domain: Eukaryota
- Kingdom: Animalia
- Phylum: Arthropoda
- Class: Insecta
- Order: Lepidoptera
- Family: Lycaenidae
- Genus: Allosmaitia
- Species: A. strophius

Binomial name
- Allosmaitia strophius (Godart, [1824])

Synonyms
- Polyommatus strophius Godart, [1824]; Thecla scoteia Hewitson, 1877; Thecla pion Godman & Salvin, [1887]; Allosmaitia pion

= Allosmaitia strophius =

Species of butterfly

Allosmaitia strophius, the Strophius hairstreak, is a butterfly of the family Lycaenidae. It is found from southern Brazil, north to Sinaloa, Mexico. Strays can be found as far north as Texas.

The wingspan is 22–32 mm. Adults are on wing year-round in Central America. In Texas, a stray was reported in November.

The larvae feed on the flowers of Malpighia species.
