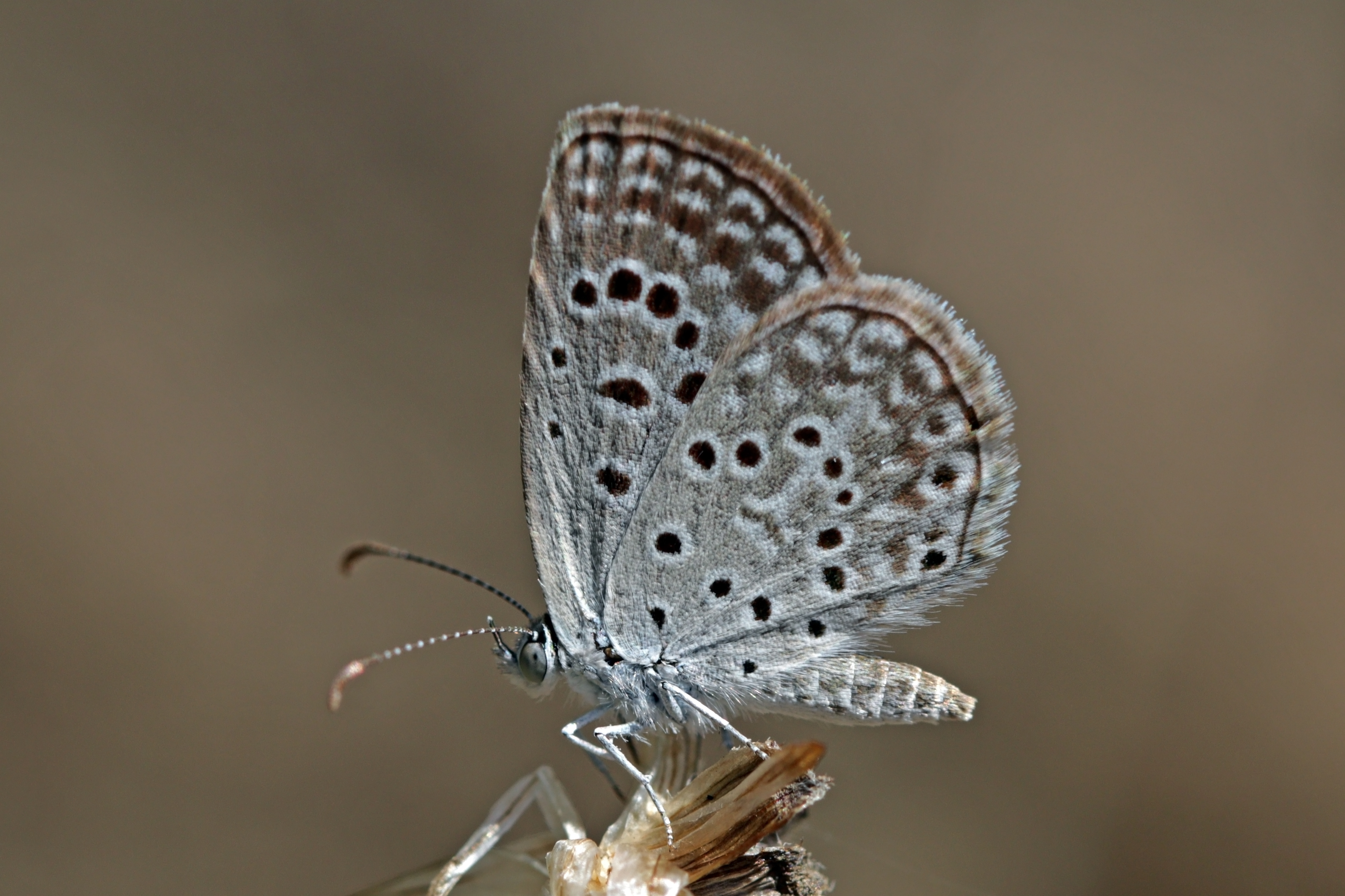
- Isalo National Park, Madagascar

Scientific classification
- Domain: Eukaryota
- Kingdom: Animalia
- Phylum: Arthropoda
- Class: Insecta
- Order: Lepidoptera
- Family: Lycaenidae
- Genus: Actizera
- Species: A. lucida

Binomial name
- Actizera lucida (Trimen, 1883)

Synonyms
- Lycaena lucida Trimen, 1883

= Actizera lucida =

Species of butterfly

Actizera lucida, the rayed blue, is a butterfly of the family Lycaenidae. It is found from eastern and southern Africa to Kenya. It is also found on Madagascar. In South Africa it is widespread from the West Cape to the Orange Free State, KwaZulu-Natal, Gauteng, Mpumalanga, the Limpopo Province and the North West Province.

The wingspan is 15–23 mm for males and 17–25 mm for females. Adults are on wing year-round, but are more common in summer.

The larvae feed on Oxalis, Argyrolobium, Rhynchosia and Crotolaria lanceolata.

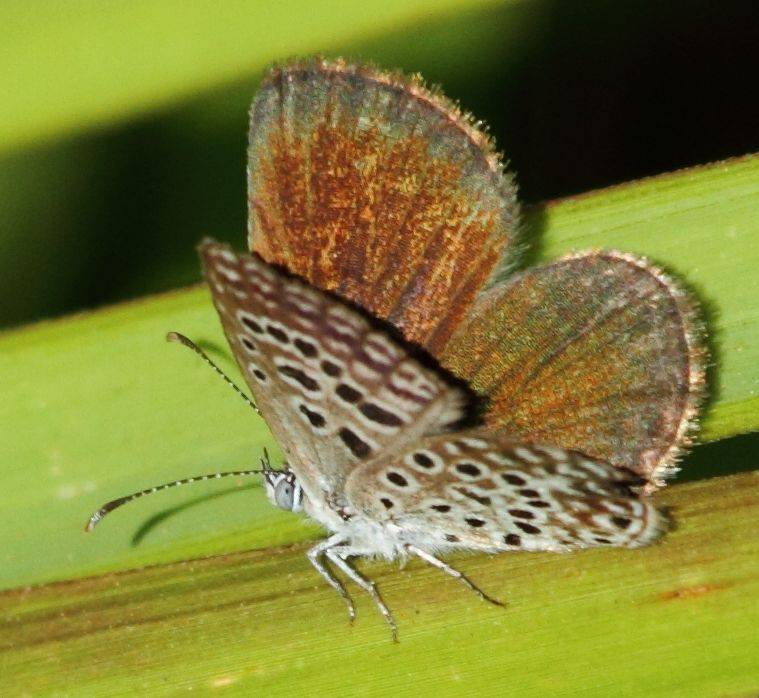
