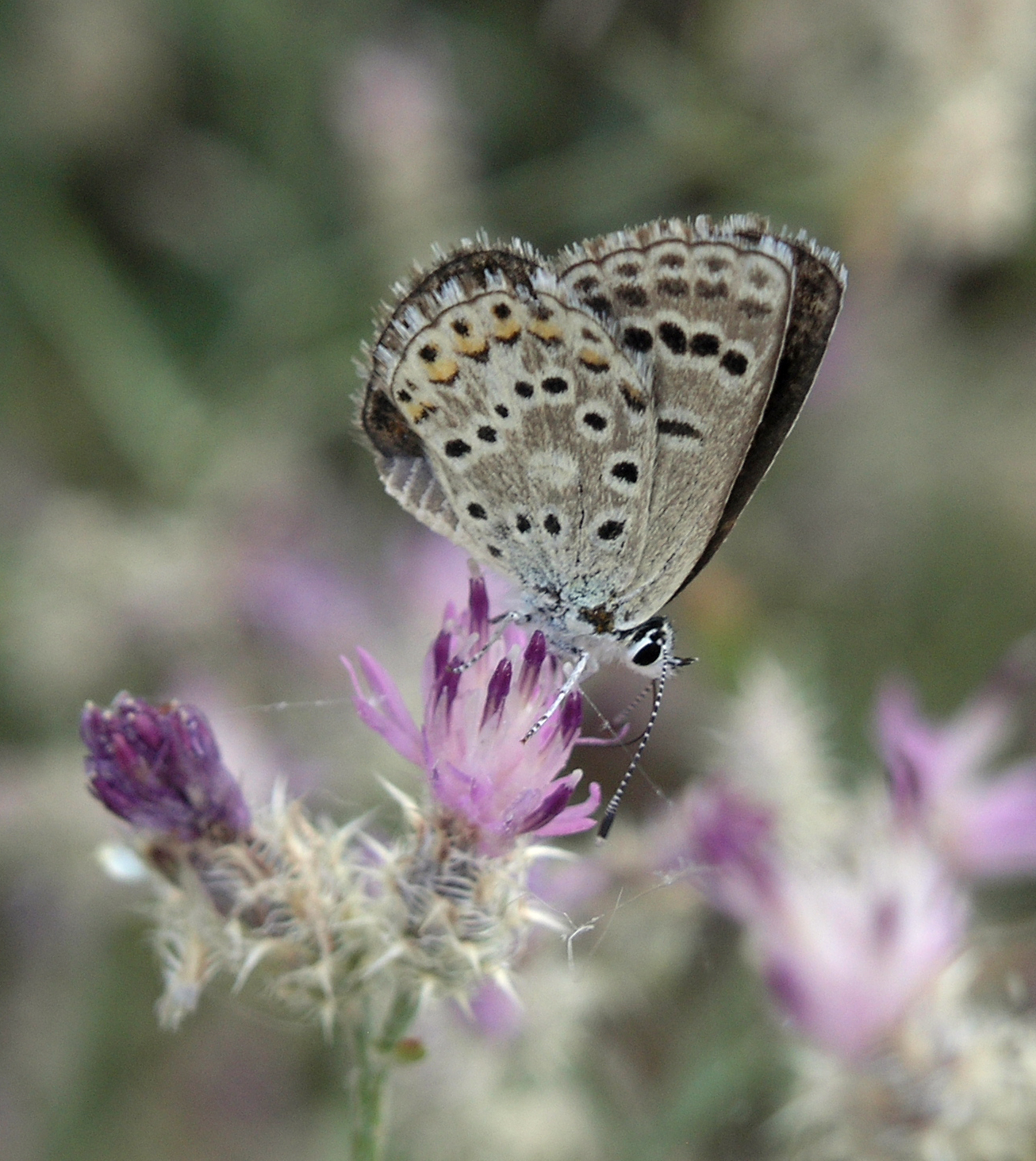

Scientific classification
- Kingdom: Animalia
- Phylum: Arthropoda
- Class: Insecta
- Order: Lepidoptera
- Family: Lycaenidae
- Genus: Alpherakya
- Species: A. sarta

Binomial name
- Alpherakya sarta (Alphéraky, 1881)

Synonyms
- Lycaena sarta Alphéraky, 1881; Polyommatus sarta (Alphéraky, 1881); Lycaena phryxis Lang, 1884; Lycaena phryxis Staudinger, 1886

= Alpherakya sarta =

Species of butterfly

Alpherakya sarta is a Palearctic species of lycaenid butterfly found in Afghanistan, Pakistan, Ghissar, Alai, Tian-Shan, Tarbagatai, Saur, South Altai and North India.

== Description ==
=== Male upperside ===
Dark brown, overlaid on both forewings and hindwings from the base outwards with bluish purple, this colour variable in extent but not reaching to the terminal margins in any specimens, and only up to or a little beyond the discs of the wings in very many. In all specimens the immediate base of the wings is suffused more or less prominently with pale blue, which is continued for a short distance down the dorsal margin of the hindwing. Forewings and hindwings: an anteciliary dark line and the hindwing in many specimens with a subterminal series of dark spots; cilia white. Underside: brownish grey. Forewing: a discocellular and a transverse discs; series of black spots, each spot encircled with white; the latter markings somewhat variable, in some specimens the discal aeries consists of five spots arranged in an outward curve, in others of six arranged in a transverse insinuate line; in nearly all specimens the edging of white on the outer side is spread diffusely outwards; beyond these there are in some specimens a subterminal inner and an outer maculated narrow transverse band, each band edged on the outer side narrowly and somewhat obscurely with white followed by an anteciliary slender black line; in other specimens the outer dark maculated band becomes a prominent, catenulate, terminal white band, each link centred with a dark spot. Hindwing: a transverse subbasal series of four and a discal series of eight black spots, each spot encircled with white; the discal series angulated outwardly on vein 5, its posterior two spots geminate, the outer white edging spread more or less diffusely outwards, generally only in the middle of the series; the discocellular spot is in most specimens large and pure white, in a few it is transversely traversed by a slender, very short, black line; the terminal markings consist of a curved subterminal series of dark spots edged outwardly with white, inwardly with ochraceous, between which latter and the discal markings is a curved transverse series of dark lunules; lastly, an anteciliary slender black line as on the forewing. Antennae black, the shafts ringed with white; head, thorax and abdomen dark brown clothed with a little purplish-blue pubescence; beneath: the palpi, thorax and abdomen white, the palpi with a fringe of stiff black hairs mixed with the white.

=== Female upperside ===
Costa broadly, termen decreasingly from apex to tornus dark brown; rest of the wing dark shining yellow, suffused for about two thirds from base with light brown that leaves a transverse broad post discal band of the yellow ground colour prominently apparent, the inner margin of the broad, dark brown, terminal edging vandyked. Hindwing: dark brown; a subterminal series of yellow, inwardly pointed, large, cone-shaped coalescent spots; the bases of the spots rest on an anteciliary brown line and bear each a dark brown spot that is very near to and in some specimens anteriorly touches the anteciliary line, the posterior two brown spots geminate. Cilia of both forewings and hindwings white alternated with fuscous. Underside, precisely similar to that of the male. Antenna as in the male; head, thorax and abdomen above dark brown without any blue pubescence; beneath: as in the male.
