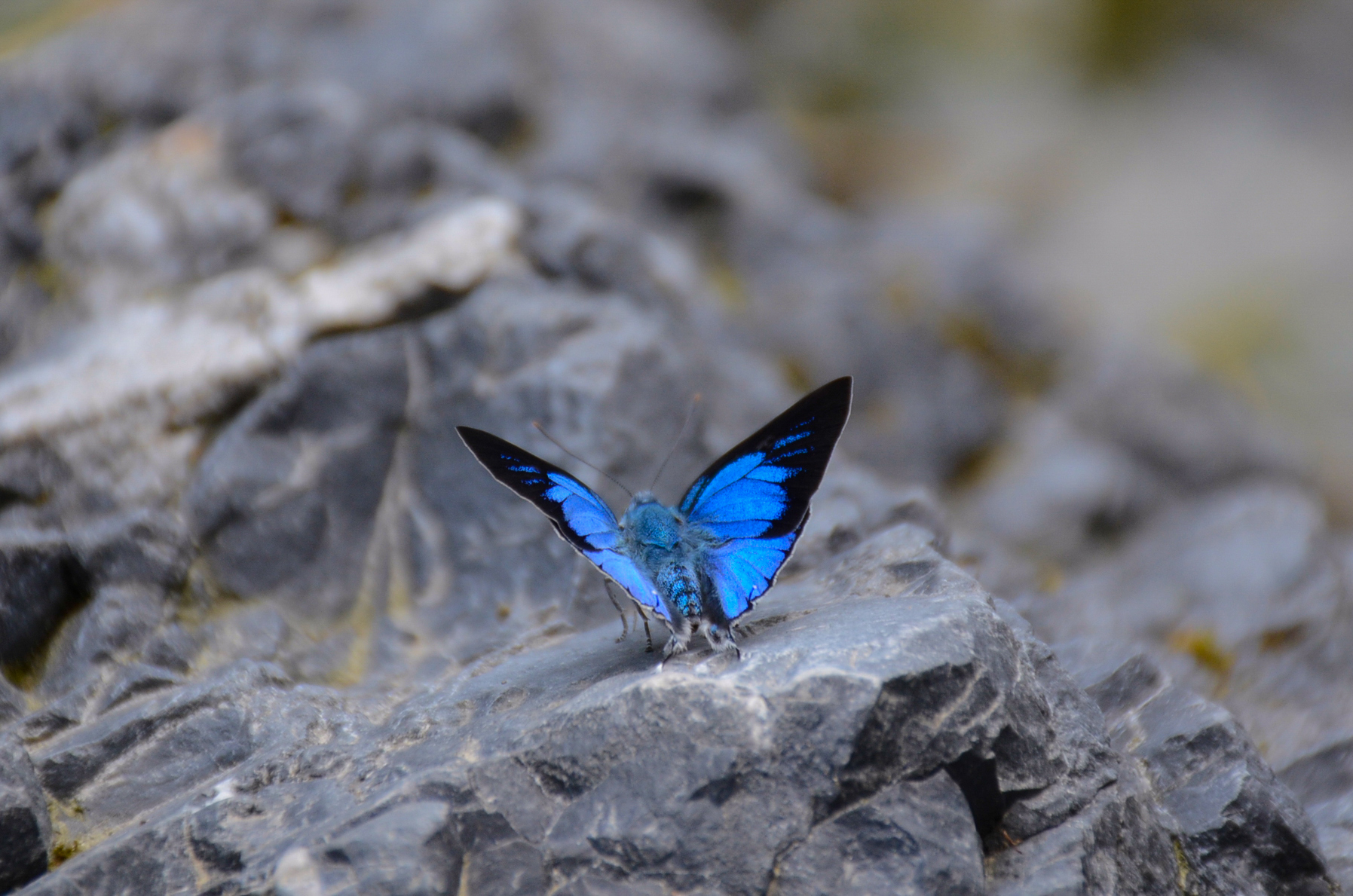

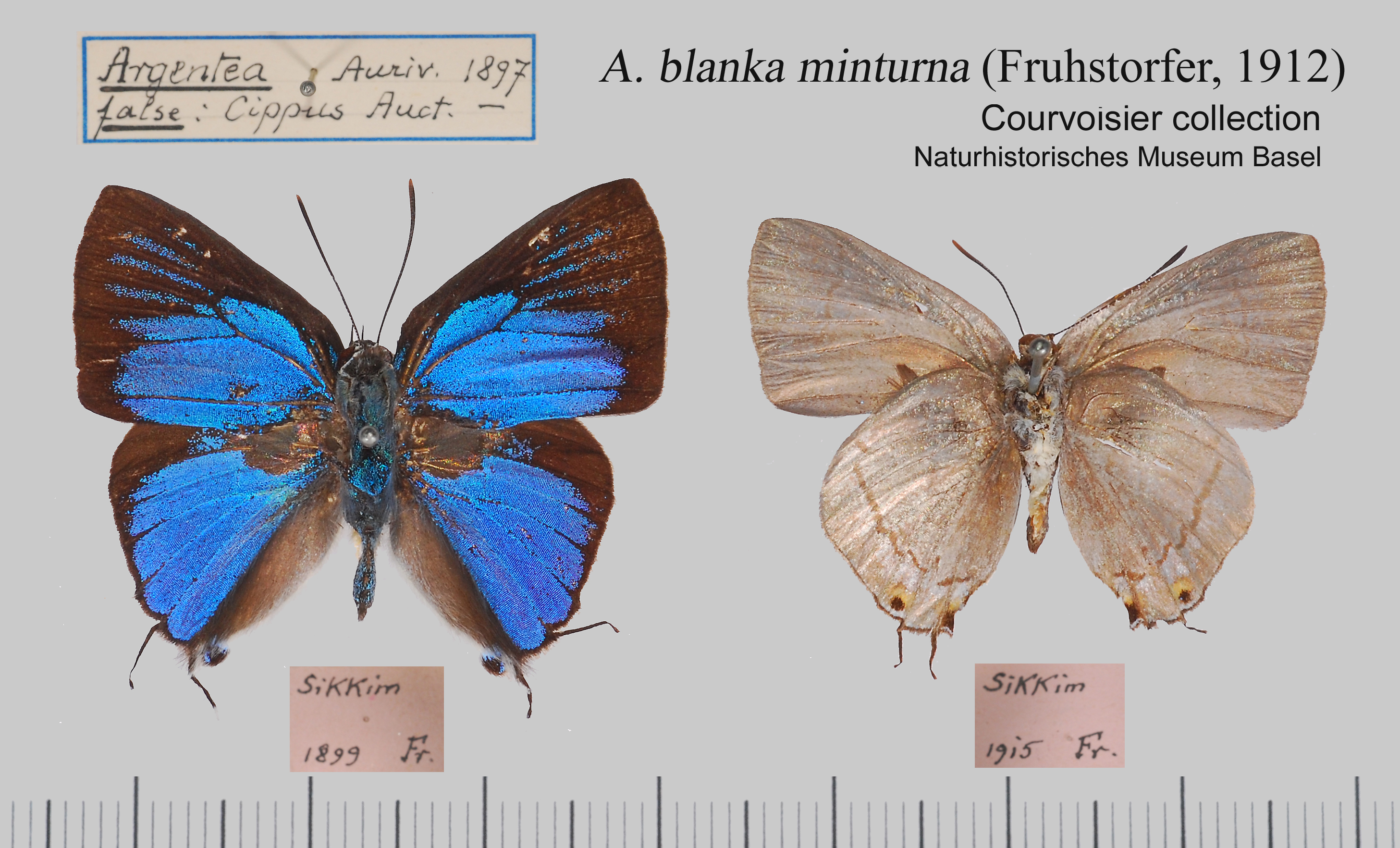
- A. b. minturna, Courvoisier Collection, Basel

Scientific classification
- Kingdom: Animalia
- Phylum: Arthropoda
- Clade: Pancrustacea
- Class: Insecta
- Order: Lepidoptera
- Family: Lycaenidae
- Genus: Ancema
- Species: A. blanka

Binomial name
- Ancema blanka (de Nicéville, 1894)

Synonyms
- Pratapa argentea Aurivillius, 1897; Pratapa lucidus H. H. Druce, 1895

= Ancema blanka =

Silver royal

Species of butterfly

Ancema blanka, the silver royal, is a species of lycaenid or blue butterfly found in the Indomalayan realm. The species was first described by Lionel de Nicéville in 1894.

== Description ==
Lionel de Nicéville described this species in 1894 as:

Female. Upperside, forewing with the costa at the base very narrowly, the apex very widely, the outer margin decreasingly black; the rest of the wing rather light clear blue. Hindwing with the costa broadly fuscous; the apex widely, the outer margin narrowly black; the abdominal margin as far as the submedian nervure whitish the rest of the wing blue; the anal lobe small, black, crowned with a few blue scales, the lobe anteriorly bearing against it a white fascia the tails rather short, black, tipped with white, the longer one from the termination of the first median nervule, the shorter from the submedian nervure. Cilia black throughout. Underside, forewing immaculate drab, the inner margin extending broadly on to the disc dull ochreous. Hindwing drab; with an irregular outer discal dark line outwardly defined by white from the abdominal margin to the third median nervule; a small oval black spot on the margin in the first median inter-space; a slightly larger black spot on the anal lobe, anteriorly and posteriorly bearing some fine turquoise-blue scales; the space between and above these spots ochreous; an anteciliary black thread inwardly defined by a narrow white thread from the anal lobe to the third median nervule; cilia of the forewing and the anterior moiety of the hindwing drab, the posterior moiety whitish. Body above clothed with lonog hairs of the shade of blue of the wings; thorax beneath drab, abdomen beneath dull ochreous.

— Lionel de Nicéville, "On new and little-known butterflies from the Indo-Malayan region"

== Subspecies ==
- A. b. blanka North India, Sikkim - Assam, Myanmar, Sumatra
- A. b. minturna (Fruhstorfer, 1912) Thailand, Laos, Sikkim, Assam, Bhutan
- A. b. nacandra (Fruhstorfer, 1912) Java
- A. b. sudica (Evans, 1926) South India
- A. b. reina Schröder & Treadaway, 1998

== Habits ==
They fly very fast. During summers, the male occasionally comes to water but usually keeps to the treetops and rocks, especially on the summit of hills, where they basks in the sun with the wings half open. Silver royals can sometimes be seen sitting on the dung of animals and by the sides of small streams and waterfalls. Females are rarely seen.
