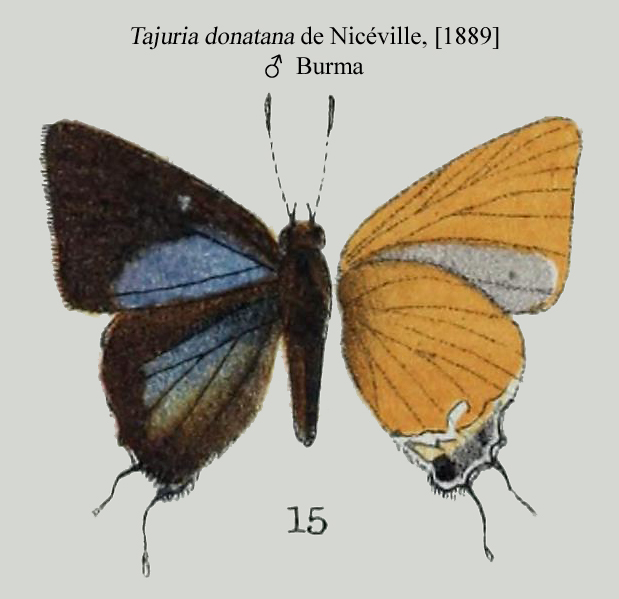
- Pseudotajuria donatana

Scientific classification
- Kingdom: Animalia
- Phylum: Arthropoda
- Class: Insecta
- Order: Lepidoptera
- Family: Lycaenidae
- Tribe: Remelanini
- Genus: Pseudotajuria; Eliot, 1973
- Species: P. donatana

Binomial name
- Pseudotajuria donatana (de Nicéville, [1889])

= Pseudotajuria =

Monotypic butterfly genus in family Lycaenidae

Pseudotajuria is a butterfly genus in the family Lycaenidae. It is monotypic, containing only the species Pseudotajuria donatana. It is found in the Indomalayan realm (Burma - Singapore, Borneo, Sumatra, Banguey, Nias)
