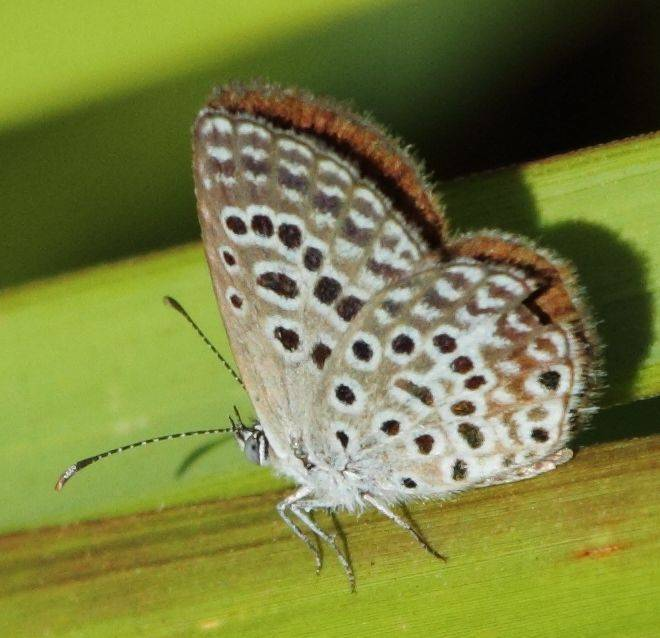
- Actizera lucida

Scientific classification
- Domain: Eukaryota
- Kingdom: Animalia
- Phylum: Arthropoda
- Class: Insecta
- Order: Lepidoptera
- Family: Lycaenidae
- Subfamily: Polyommatinae
- Tribe: Polyommatini
- Genus: Actizera; Chapman, 1910

= Actizera =

Butterfly genus in family Lycaenidae

Actizera is a genus of butterflies in the family Lycaenidae which are found in the Afrotropical realm.

== Species ==
- Actizera atrigemmata (Butler, 1878)
- Actizera drucei (Bethune-Baker, 1906)
- Actizera lucida (Trimen, 1883)
- Actizera stellata (Trimen, 1883)
