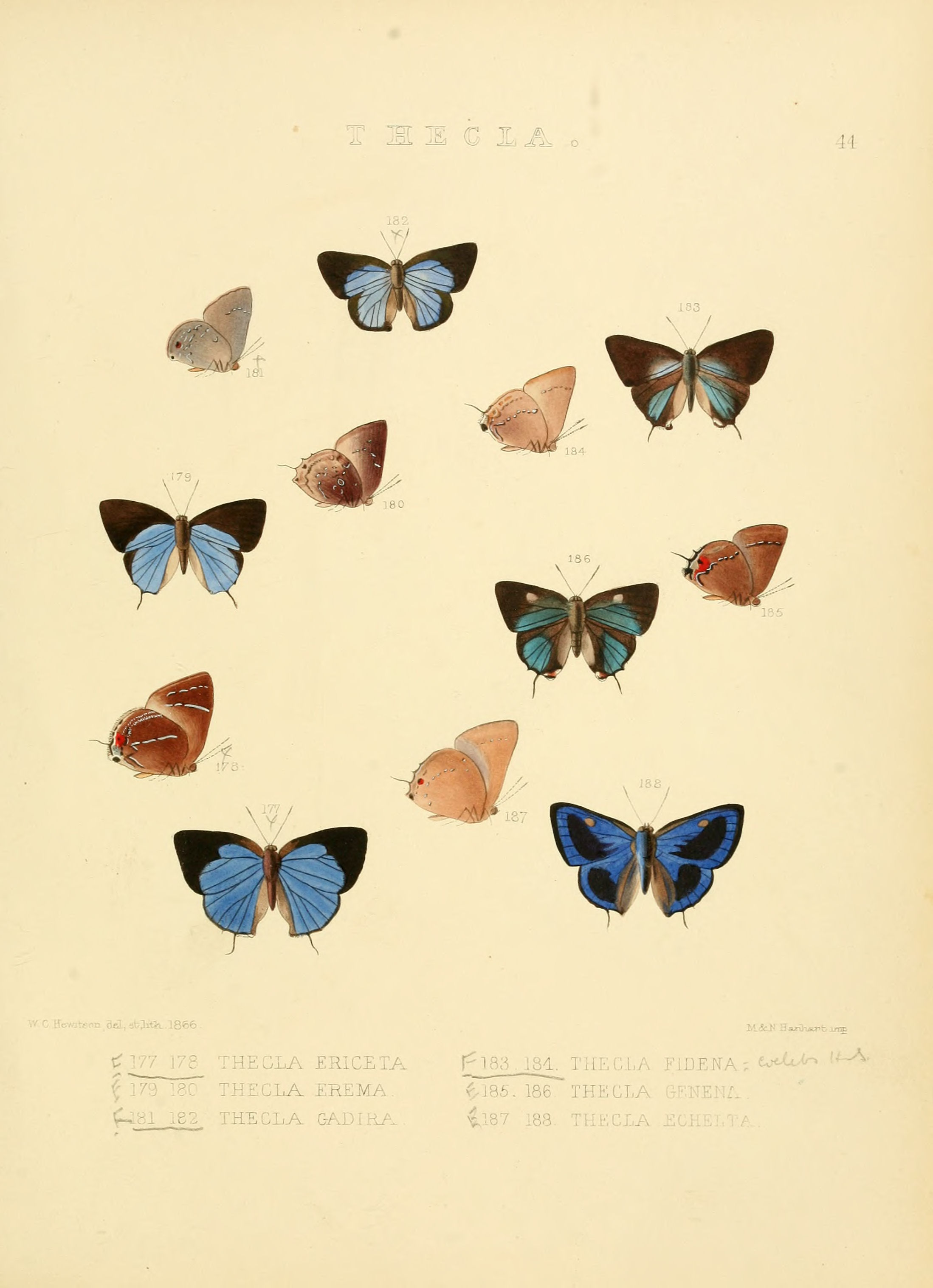
- Allosmaitia fidena in William Chapman Hewitson's Illustrations of Diurnal Lepidoptera

Scientific classification
- Kingdom: Animalia
- Phylum: Arthropoda
- Clade: Pancrustacea
- Class: Insecta
- Order: Lepidoptera
- Family: Lycaenidae
- Tribe: Eumaeini
- Genus: Allosmaitia; Clench, 1964

= Allosmaitia =

Butterfly genus in family Lycaenidae

Allosmaitia is a genus of butterflies in the family Lycaenidae. The species are found in the Neotropical realm.

== Species ==
- Allosmaitia coelebs (Herrich-Schäffer, 1862)
- Allosmaitia fidena (Hewitson, 1867)
- Allosmaitia piplea (Godman & Salvin, 1896)
- Allosmaitia strophius (Godart, [1824])
- Allosmaitia myrtusa (Hewitson, 1867)
