= Alciphronia =

Scientific classification
- Domain: Eukaryota
- Kingdom: Animalia
- Phylum: Arthropoda
- Class: Insecta
- Order: Lepidoptera
- Family: Lycaenidae
- Genus: Alciphronia; Koçak, 1992

Butterfly genus in family Lycaenidae

Alciphronia is a genus of butterflies in the family Lycaenidae. It was originally described as subgenus of Heodes. Its taxonomic status is doubtful.
