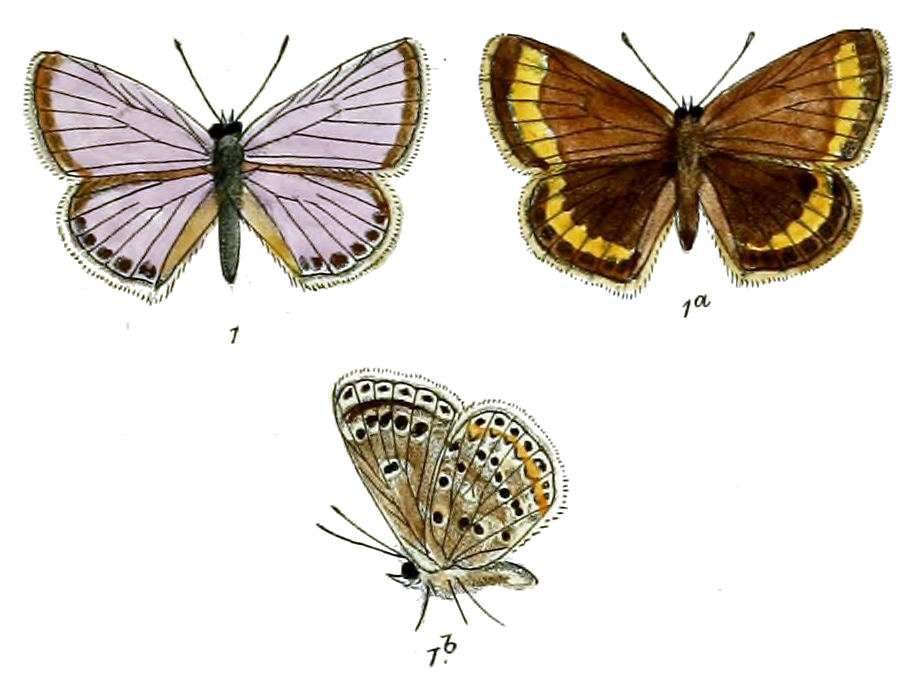
- Illustration of Alpherakya sartoides.

Scientific classification
- Domain: Eukaryota
- Kingdom: Animalia
- Phylum: Arthropoda
- Class: Insecta
- Order: Lepidoptera
- Family: Lycaenidae
- Subfamily: Polyommatinae
- Tribe: Polyommatini
- Genus: Alpherakya; Zhdanko, 1994

= Alpherakya =

Butterfly genus in family Lycaenidae

Alpherakya is a Palearctic genus of butterflies in the family Lycaenidae.

== Species ==
Listed alphabetically:

- Alpherakya devanica (Moore, [1875])
- Alpherakya pilgram (Bálint & Johnson, 1997) Central Asia
- Alpherakya sarta (Alphéraky, 1881)
- Alpherakya sartoides (Swinhoe, 1910) Darvaz, Alai, Pamirs, Afghanistan, Pakistan, North India.
