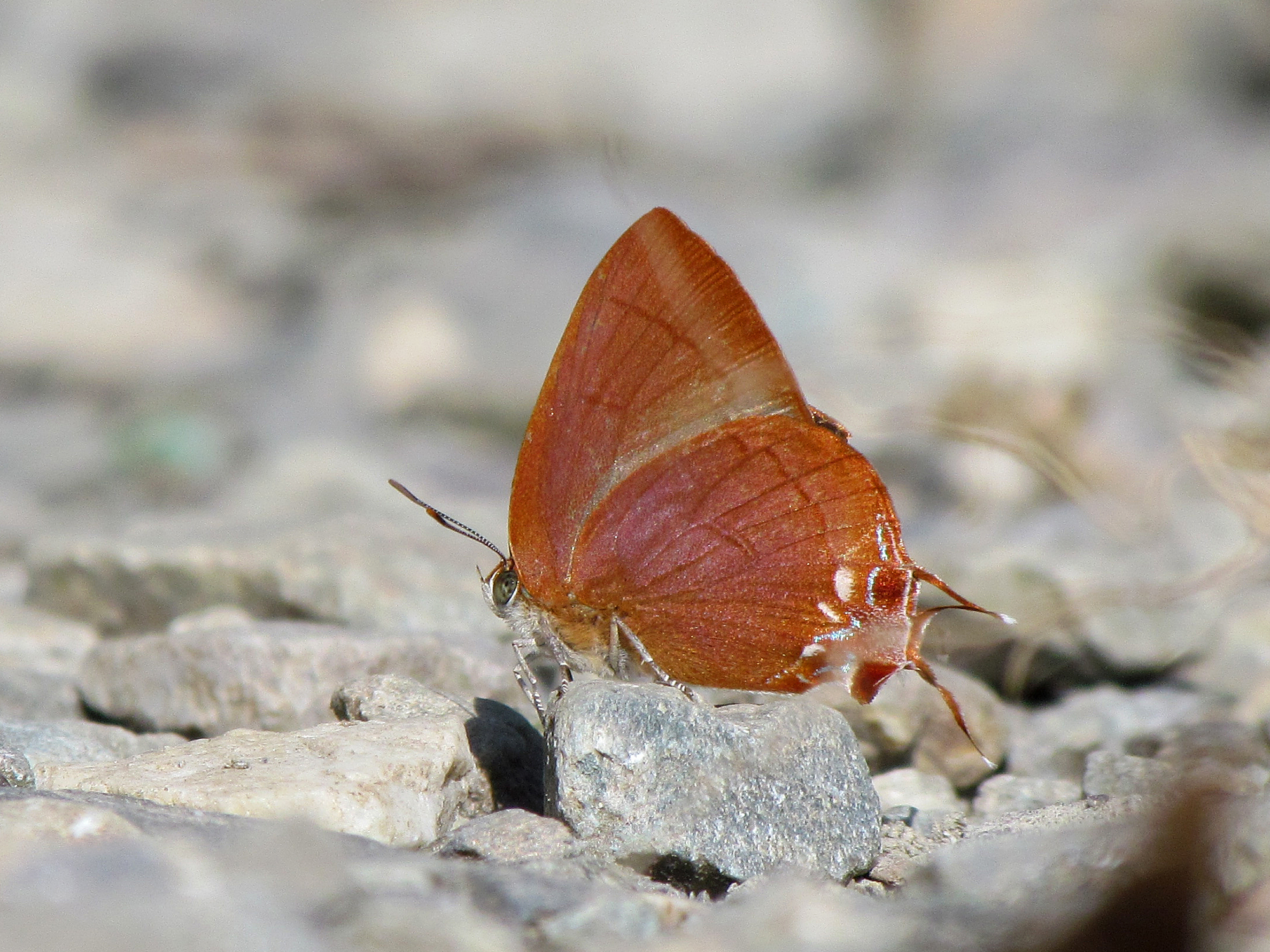
- Ventral view
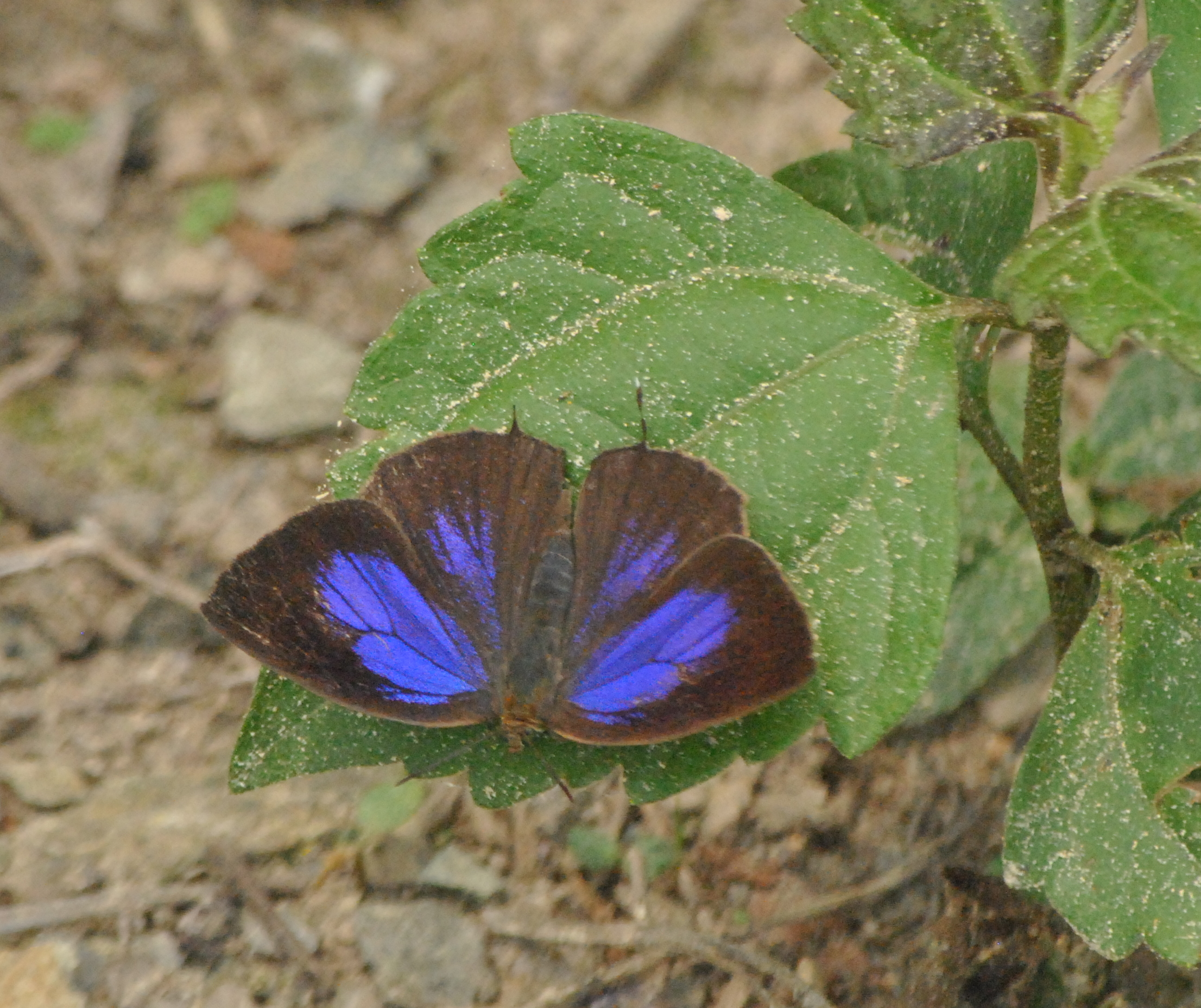
- Dorsal view

Scientific classification
- Kingdom: Animalia
- Phylum: Arthropoda
- Clade: Pancrustacea
- Class: Insecta
- Order: Lepidoptera
- Family: Lycaenidae
- Genus: Remelana
- Species: R. jangala

Binomial name
- Remelana jangala (Horsfield, 1829)

= Remelana jangala =

Chocolate royal

Species of butterfly

Remelana jangala, the chocolate royal, is a lycaenid or blue butterfly found in South Asia. The species was first described by Thomas Horsfield in 1829. This species is found only in Eastern Himalayas.

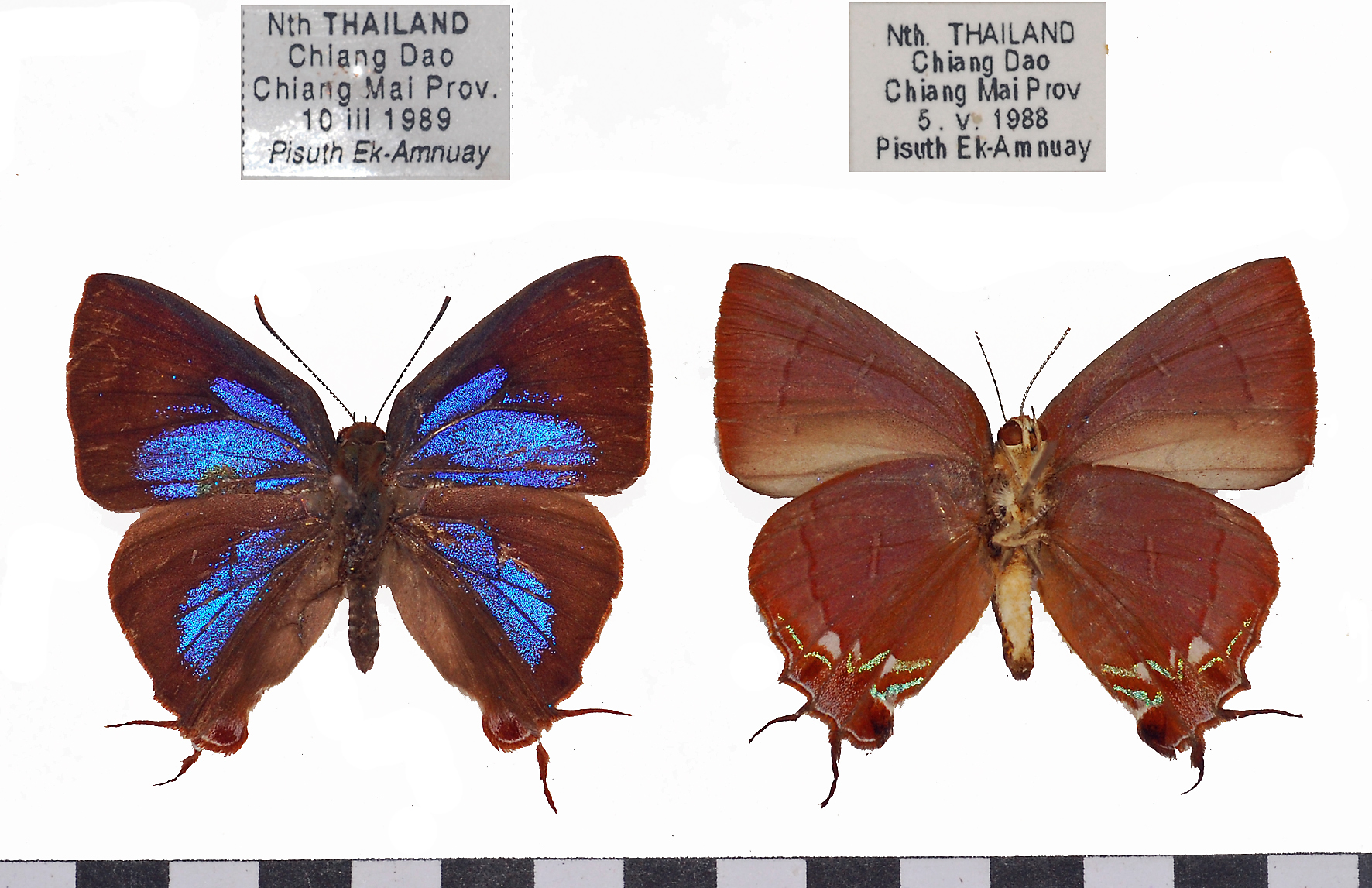

== Subspecies ==
The subspecies of Remelana jangala which are found in India are:

- Remelana jangala ravata Moore, 1865 – northern chocolate royal
- Remelana jangala andamanica Wood-Mason & de Nicéville, 1881 – powdery chocolate royal

== Behavioral patterns ==
Only short flights of the butterfly can be seen. Male chocolate royal are seen sitting on wet ground and drinking water. They are seldom seen sitting on flowers to suck nectar. However, they are seen sitting on bird faeces and extracting mineral salt. They are usually seen basking in the sun with their upper wings opened.
