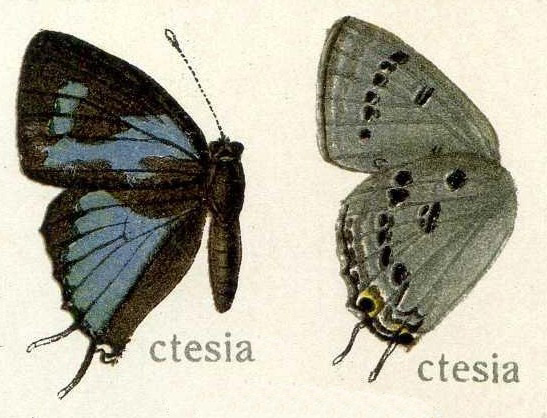
- Ancema ctesia

Scientific classification
- Domain: Eukaryota
- Kingdom: Animalia
- Phylum: Arthropoda
- Class: Insecta
- Order: Lepidoptera
- Family: Lycaenidae
- Tribe: Remelanini
- Genus: Ancema; Eliot, 1973

Synonyms
- Camena Hewitson, 1865

= Ancema =

Butterfly genus in family Lycaenidae

Ancema is a butterfly genus in the family Lycaenidae. The species of this genus are found in the Indomalayan realm and the Palearctic realm (the north-western Himalayas to western China).

== Species ==
- Ancema blanka (de Nicéville, 1894)
- Ancema ctesia (Hewitson, 1865)
