= Apangea =

Scientific classification
- Domain: Eukaryota
- Kingdom: Animalia
- Phylum: Arthropoda
- Class: Insecta
- Order: Lepidoptera
- Family: Lycaenidae
- Genus: Apangea

Monotypic butterfly genus in family Lycaenidae

Apangea is a genus of butterflies in the family Lycaenidae. The genus is monotypic containing the single species Apangea pang (Oberthür, 1886) endemic to Tibet and West China. This species is sometimes placed in Lycaena.
