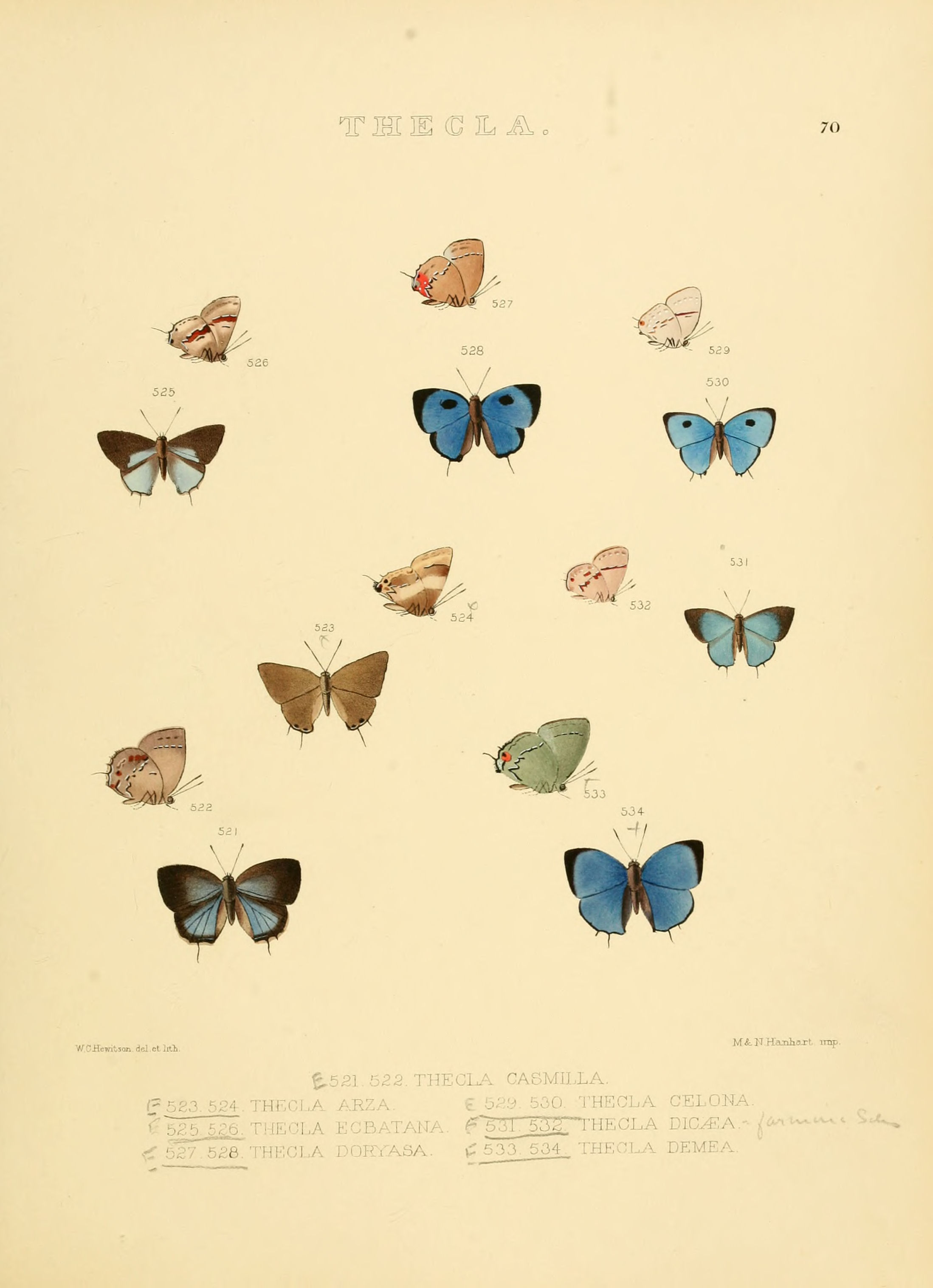
- Arzecla arza the type species of the genus

Scientific classification
- Kingdom: Animalia
- Phylum: Arthropoda
- Class: Insecta
- Order: Lepidoptera
- Family: Lycaenidae
- Tribe: Eumaeini
- Genus: Arzecla; Duarte et Robbins, 2010.

= Arzecla =

Butterfly genus in family Lycaenidae

Arzecla is a Neotropical butterfly genus in the family Lycaenidae, formerly part of Lamprospilus.

== Species ==
- Arzecla albolineata (Lathy, 1936) Colombia.
- Arzecla arza (Hewitson, 1874) Mexico, Nicaragua et au Brazil.
- Arzecla calatia (Hewitson, 1873) Mexico, Guatemala, Nicaragua Guyane.
- Arzecla canacha (Hewitson, 1877) Venezuela.
- Arzecla nubilum (H. Druce, 1907) Brazil.
- Arzecla paralus (Godman & Salvin, 1887) Guatemala, Costa Rica Venezuela.
- Arzecla sethon (Godman & Salvin, 1887) Mexico.
- Arzecla taminella (Schaus, 1902) Brazil, Guyane.
- Arzecla tarpa (Godman & Salvin, 1887) Mexico, Panama.
- Arzecla tucumanensis (K. Johnson & Kroenlein, 1993) Argentina
