= Arases =

Scientific classification
- Domain: Eukaryota
- Kingdom: Animalia
- Phylum: Arthropoda
- Class: Insecta
- Order: Lepidoptera
- Family: Lycaenidae
- Genus: Arases; Johnson, 1992

Butterfly genus in family Lycaenidae

Arases is a genus of butterflies in the family Lycaenidae.
