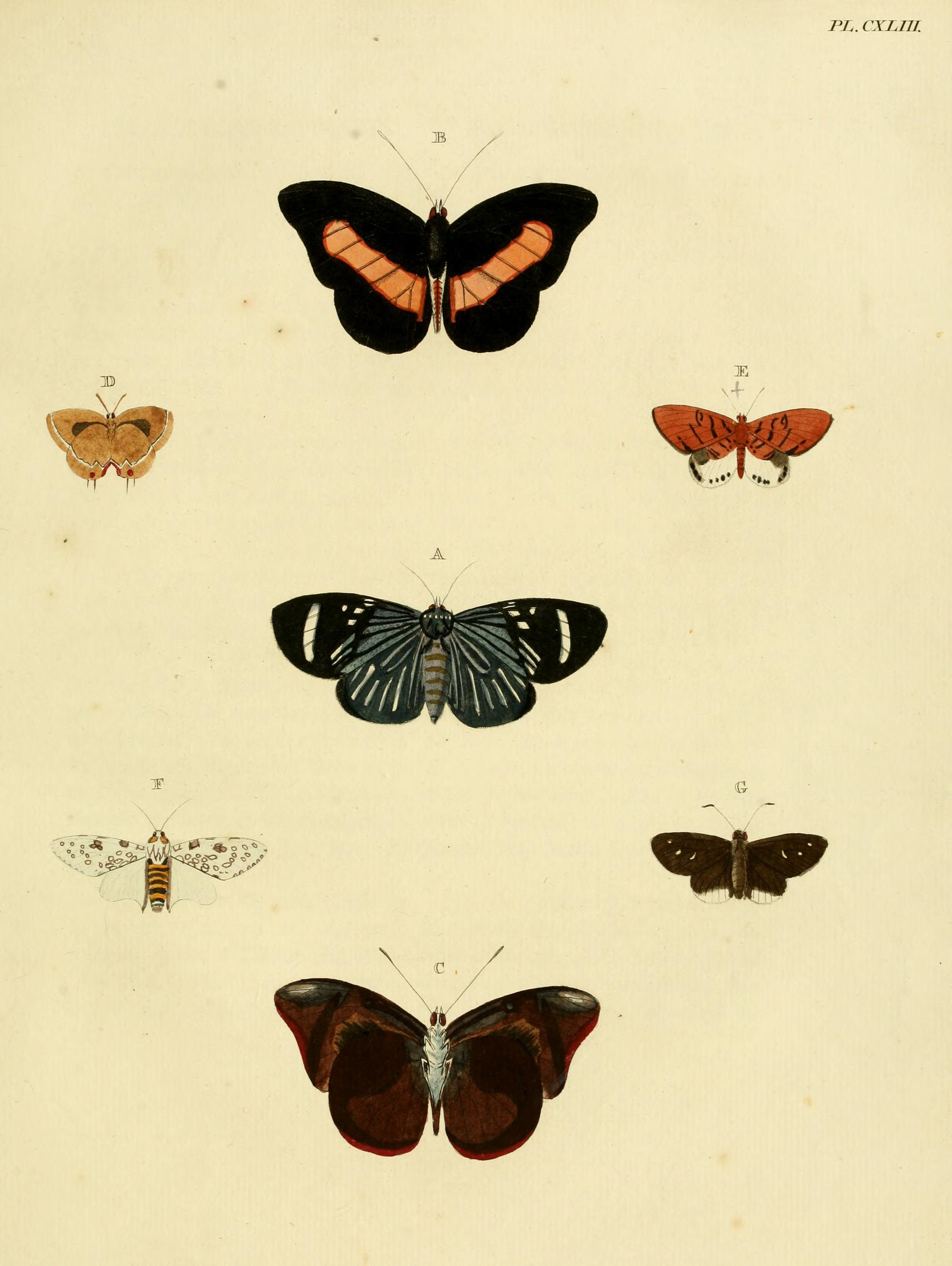
- Artipe eryx, figure D from Cramer and Stoll's De Uitlandsche Kapellen

Scientific classification
- Kingdom: Animalia
- Phylum: Arthropoda
- Class: Insecta
- Order: Lepidoptera
- Family: Lycaenidae
- Tribe: Deudorigini
- Genus: Artipe; Boisduval, 1870

= Artipe =

Butterfly genus in family Lycaenidae

Artipe is a genus of butterflies in the family Lycaenidae. The species of this genus are found in the Indomalayan realm, the Palearctic realm (Himalayas - China), and the Australasian realm (New Guinea).

Genus Artipe was erected by Jean Baptiste Boisduval in 1870.

== Species ==
- Artipe anna (Druce, 1896)
- Artipe eryx (Linnaeus, 1771) - green flash
- Artipe grandis (Rothschild & Jordan, 1905) New Guinea
- Artipe dohertyi (Oberthür, 1894) New Guinea
