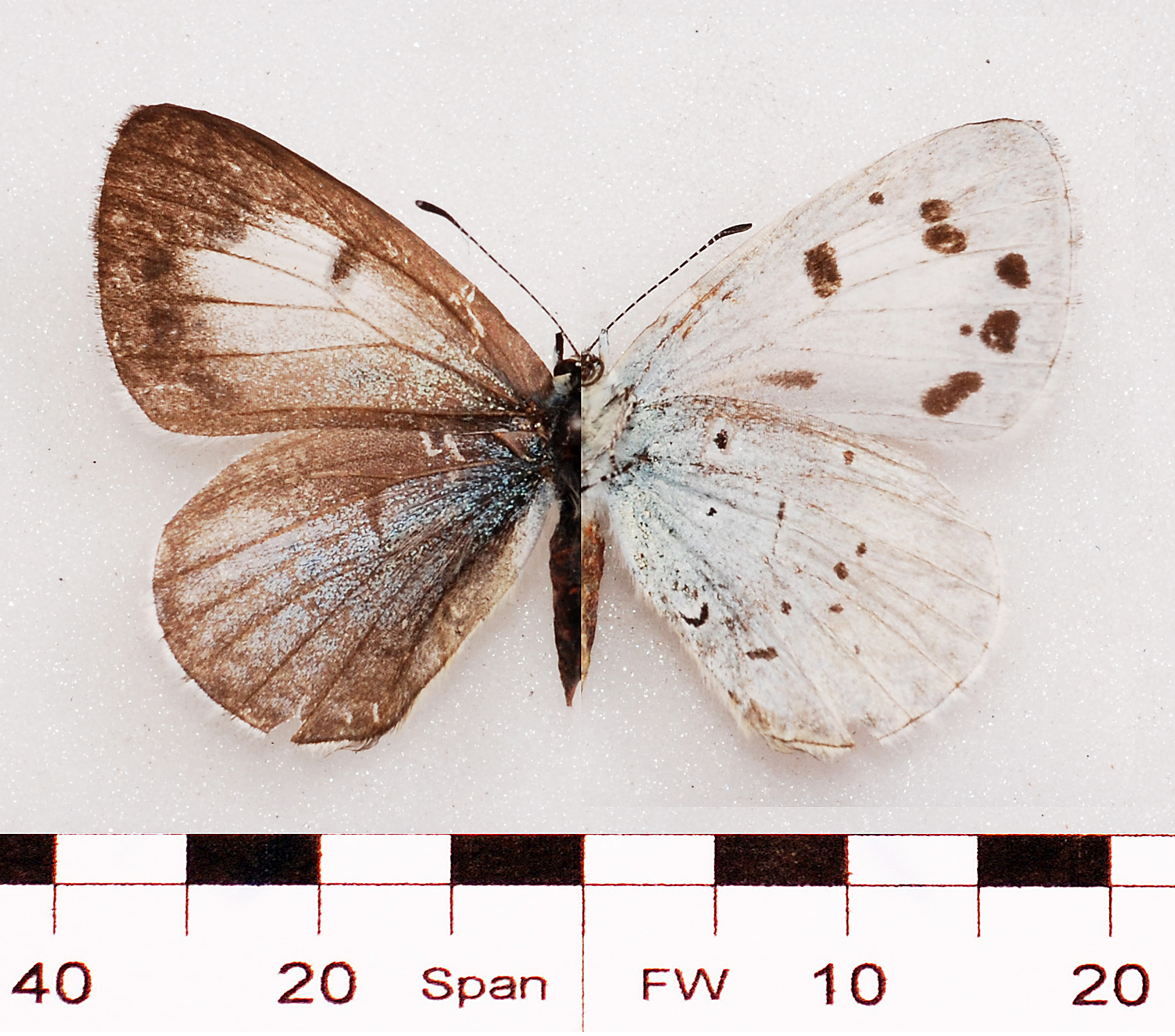
- Oreolyce vardhana nepalica female

Scientific classification
- Domain: Eukaryota
- Kingdom: Animalia
- Phylum: Arthropoda
- Class: Insecta
- Order: Lepidoptera
- Family: Lycaenidae
- Genus: Oreolyce
- Species: O. vardhana

Binomial name
- Oreolyce vardhana (Moore, 1874)

Synonyms
- Cyaniris vardhana; Lycaenopsis vardhana (Moore); Arletta vardhana

= Oreolyce vardhana =

Dusky hedge blue

Species of butterfly

Oreolyce vardhana, the dusky hedge blue, is a small butterfly found in Sri Lanka that belongs to the lycaenids or blues family.

== Description ==
Male upperside forewing: costa, apex and termen very broadly dusky black; at apex this colour occupies more than a third of the wing in some specimens, and in most is carried narrowly along the dorsal margin to the base; the remainder of the wing pale iridescent blue; the discocellulars marked by a jet-black, very prominent, short, posteriorly acute bar. Hindwing: costal margin broadly shaded with dusky black, the rest of the wing pale iridescent blue, the posterior veins black, very prominent. Underside: pearly white, the bases of the wings slightly glossed with blue. Forewing: a short broad line on the discocellulars, three upper discal spots placed obliquely beyond it, the anterior two mere minute dots and a postdiscal inwardly oblique series of three larger spots, all dark brown. Hindwing: uniform with a few minute dark brown spots, of which a basal spot in interspace 7 and another further outwards in the same interspace are the most conspicuous. Cilia of both forewings and hindwings white. Antenna, head and thorax dark brown, the antennae as usual ringed with white; beneath: the palpi, thorax and abdomen white. Female very similar to the male, differs as follows: Upperside, forewing: the disc white, very faintly irrorated with iridescent.

== Range ==
It is found in Sri Lanka.

== See also ==
- List of butterflies of India
- List of butterflies of India (Lycaenidae)
