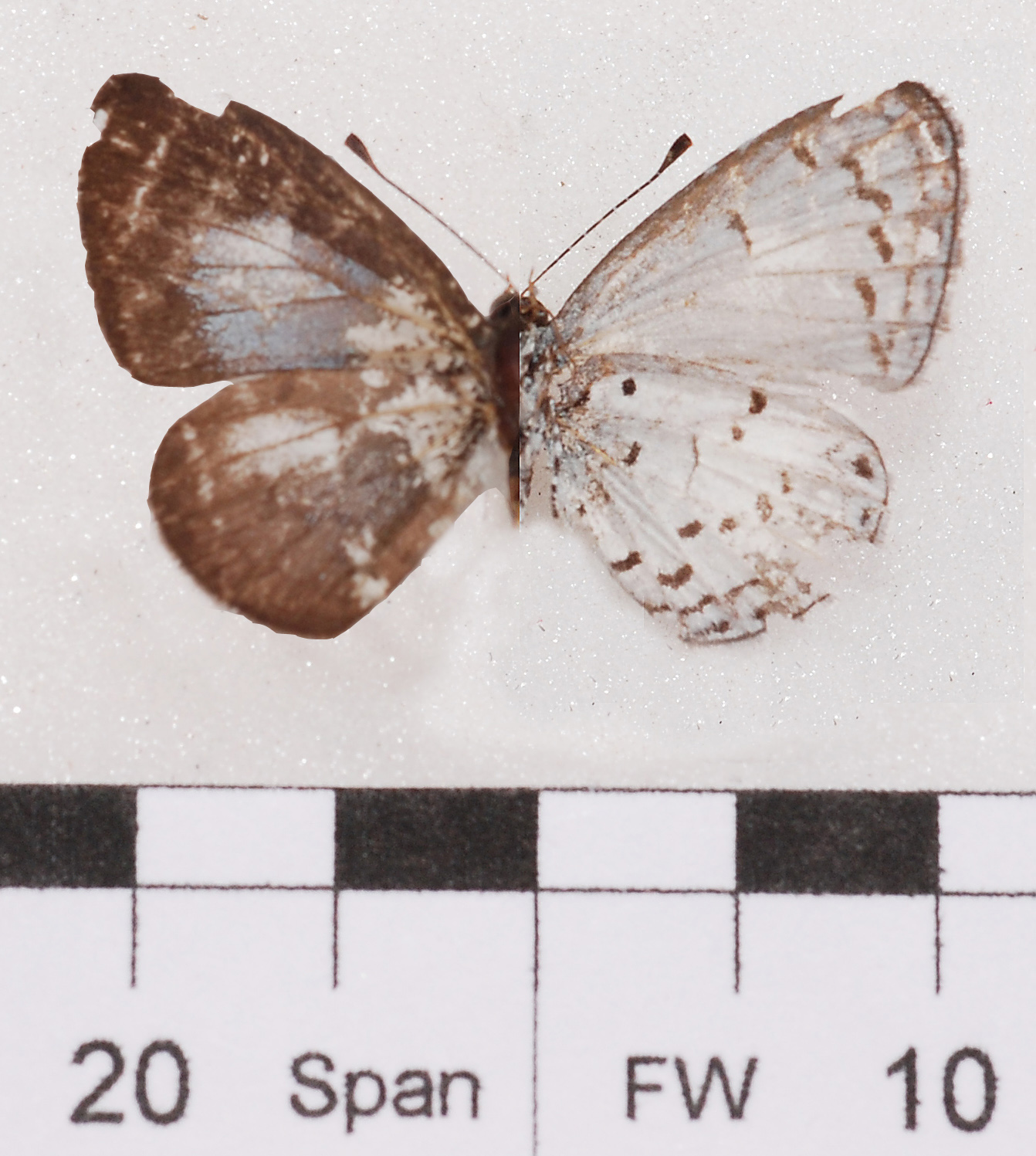
- Oreolyce archena set specimen upperside left, underside right

Scientific classification
- Domain: Eukaryota
- Kingdom: Animalia
- Phylum: Arthropoda
- Class: Insecta
- Order: Lepidoptera
- Family: Lycaenidae
- Subfamily: Polyommatinae
- Tribe: Polyommatini
- Genus: Oreolyce; Toxopeus, 1927

= Oreolyce =

Butterfly genus in family Lycaenidae

Oreolyce is an Indomalayan genus of butterflies in the family Lycaenidae.

== Species ==
Subgenus Oreolyce

- Oreolyce quadriplaga (Snellen, 1892) – Naga hedge blue
- Oreolyce archena (Corbet, 1940)
- Oreolyce boulti (Chapman, 1912) Borneo
- Oreolyce dohertyi (Tytler, 1915) Naga Hills

Subgenus Arletta Hemming, 1935

- Oreolyce vardhana (Moore, [1875]) – dusky hedge blue
