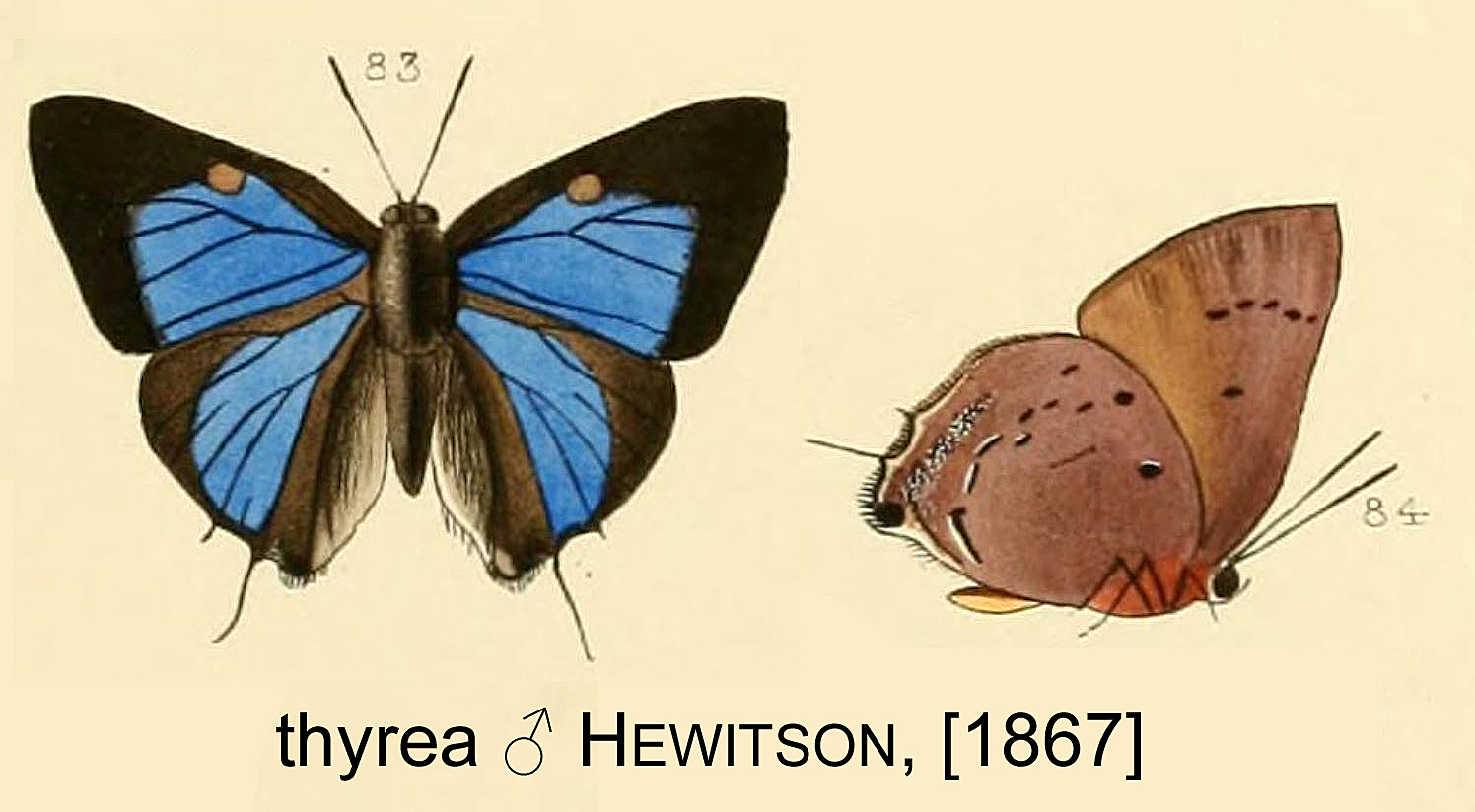

Scientific classification
- Kingdom: Animalia
- Phylum: Arthropoda
- Class: Insecta
- Order: Lepidoptera
- Family: Lycaenidae
- Genus: Thepytus
- Species: T. thyrea

Binomial name
- Thepytus thyrea (Hewitson, 1867)

= Thepytus thyrea =

Species of butterfly

Thepytus thyrea is a Neotropical butterfly in the family Lycaenidae. It is found in French Guiana, Panama and Brazil (Amazonas).
