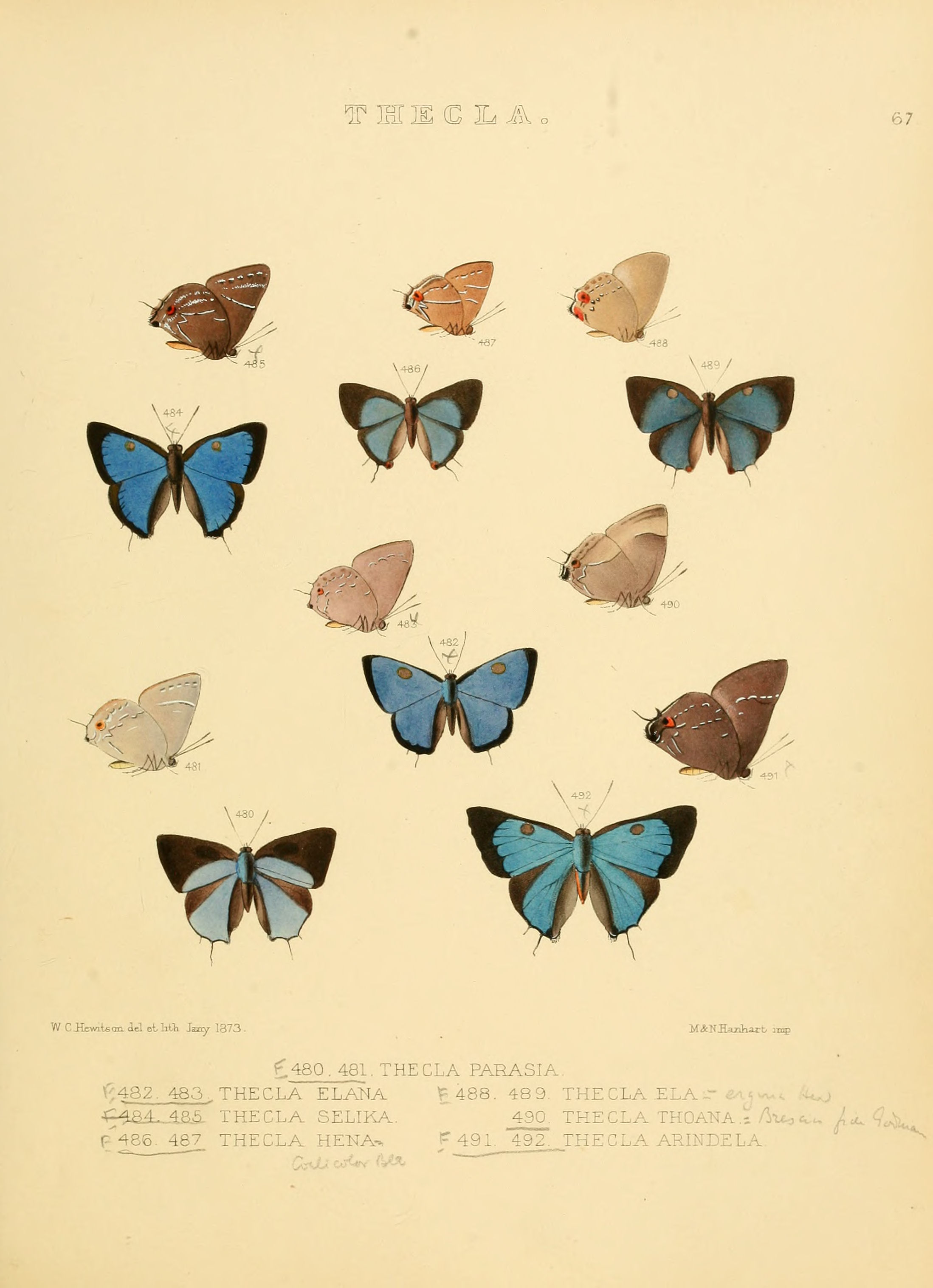
- Thepytus arindela, figures 491 and 492

Scientific classification
- Domain: Eukaryota
- Kingdom: Animalia
- Phylum: Arthropoda
- Class: Insecta
- Order: Lepidoptera
- Family: Lycaenidae
- Tribe: Eumaeini
- Genus: Thepytus; Robbins, 2004

= Thepytus =

Butterfly genus in family Lycaenidae

Thepytus is a Neotropical genus of butterflies in the family Lycaenidae.

== Species ==
- Thepytus epytus (Godman & Salvin, [1887])
- Thepytus thyrea (Hewitson, 1867)
- Thepytus arindela (Hewitson, 1874)
- Thepytus echelta (Hewitson, 1867)
