= Rapala laximae =

Scientific classification
- Kingdom: Animalia
- Phylum: Arthropoda
- Clade: Pancrustacea
- Class: Insecta
- Order: Lepidoptera
- Family: Lycaenidae
- Genus: Rapala
- Species: R. laximae

Binomial name
- Rapala laximae KC, Shirey & Grishin, 2026

Species of butterfly

Rapala laximae is a species of butterfly in the family Lycaenidae. It is known only from Taw Maw in Kachin State, Myanmar, where the two known specimens were collected in April 1963. It was described in 2026, and the name "narrow-banded flash" has been proposed for it.

== Taxonomy ==
The butterfly first appeared in the literature in 1959, when Cantlie described a form from Sadon, Myanmar, as Rapala nissa ranta var. bifida. Under the International Code of Zoological Nomenclature (Article 45.5), a fourth name added to a trinomen is treated as infrasubspecific, so bifida is not an available name. Huang later used the combination R. subpurpurea bifida, but supplied no description or statement of new authorship, which makes that name a nomen nudum.

In 2026 the taxon was formally described as a new species by Sajan KC, Vaughn Shirey and Nick Grishin. The name honours Laxmi Khadka, the mother of the first author, and comes from "Laxima", an informal name she goes by.

The authors sequenced the holotype and one paratype as part of a whole-genome study of Asian Rapala. The species was recovered as the sister species of Rapala duma, with a COI (Kimura 2-parameter) divergence of 3.78%. Despite their close genetic relationship, the two species differ markedly in wing pattern, and R. laximae more closely resembles R. nissa and R. rectivitta.

== Description ==
Only males are known. The wingspan of the holotype is 40 mm, with a forewing length of 20 mm and a hindwing length of 16 mm. The upperside is purple, with only faint iridescence on the upper hindwing and the base of the forewing when viewed at a 180° angle. The male has a large white rectangular brand at the base of space 7 on the hindwing. The underside is purplish brown with thin, straight bands. On the hindwing, the band in space 1b is broad, oblique, yellow and edged in black and white, and a black tornal spot and a white-tipped black tail are present.

The species can be told apart from R. nissa and R. huangi by its thinner, straighter ventral bands and by the partly iridescent upperside, which is absent in those species. R. rectivitta is fully iridescent above. In male genitalia, the cleft between the valvae reaches about half the length of the valval plate, which is deeper than in R. nissa and R. huangi, and the tip of the aedeagus has a median cleft at its distal margin.

== Distribution and habitat ==
R. laximae is known only from the type locality at Taw Maw, Kachin State, Myanmar, at an elevation of about 845 m. The holotype was collected on 15 April 1963 and the paratype on 14 April 1963, both by S. and L. Steinhauser. The authors suggest the species may also occur in neighbouring northeastern India. Based on related species, adults are thought to inhabit forest and forest edges and to visit flowers, stream banks and damp ground.
