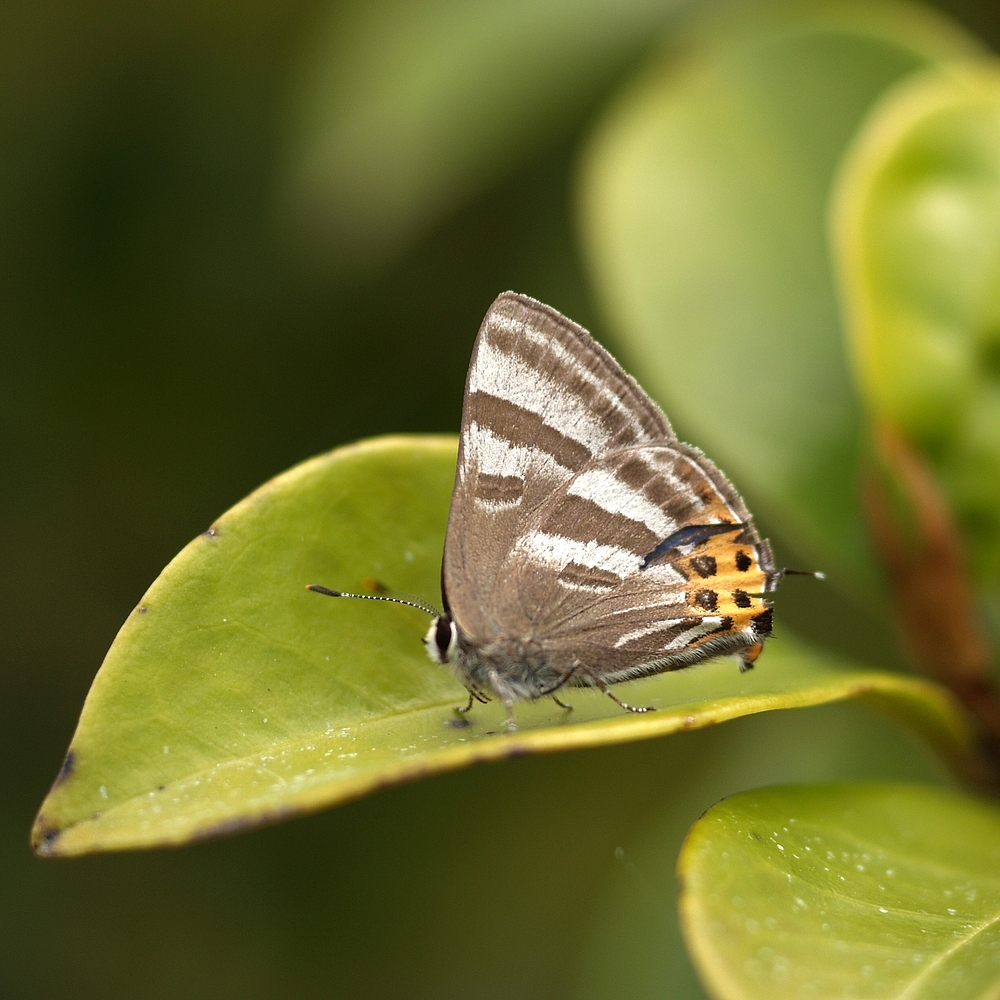
- Rapala arata

Scientific classification
- Kingdom: Animalia
- Phylum: Arthropoda
- Clade: Pancrustacea
- Class: Insecta
- Order: Lepidoptera
- Family: Lycaenidae
- Subfamily: Theclinae
- Tribe: Deudorigini

Genera
- Currently 9, see text

= Deudorigini =

Tribe of butterflies

The Deudorigini are a tribe of butterflies in the family Lycaenidae.

== Genera ==
As not all Theclinae have been assigned to tribes, the following list of genera is preliminary:

- Araotes
- Artipe
- Bindahara
- Capys
- Deudorix (including Actis, Hypokopelates, Virachola)
- Hypomyrina
- Paradeudorix
- Pilodeudorix (including Diopetes)
- Qinorapala
- Rapala
- Sinthusa
- Sithon
