= List of lycaenid genera: Q =

The large butterfly family Lycaenidae contains the following genera starting with the letter Q:

- Qinorapala
