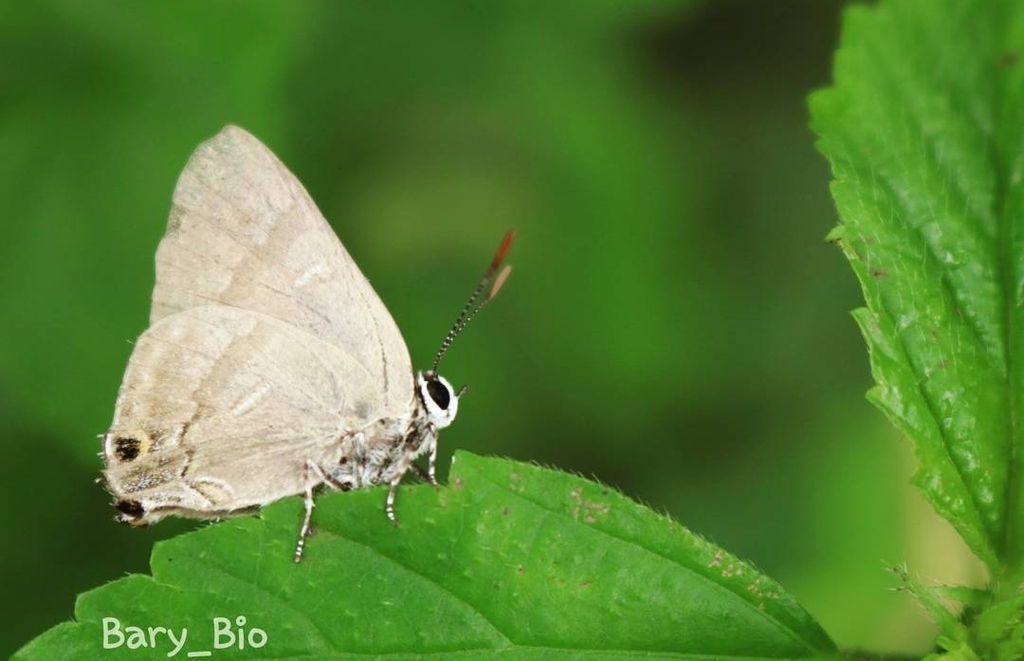

Scientific classification
- Kingdom: Animalia
- Phylum: Arthropoda
- Class: Insecta
- Order: Lepidoptera
- Family: Lycaenidae
- Genus: Rapala
- Species: R. christopheri

Binomial name
- Rapala christopheri Lane & Müller, 2006

= Rapala christopheri =

Species of butterfly

Rapala christopheri is a butterfly in the family Lycaenidae. It was described by David A. Lane and Chris J. Müller in 2006. It is endemic to Timor.
