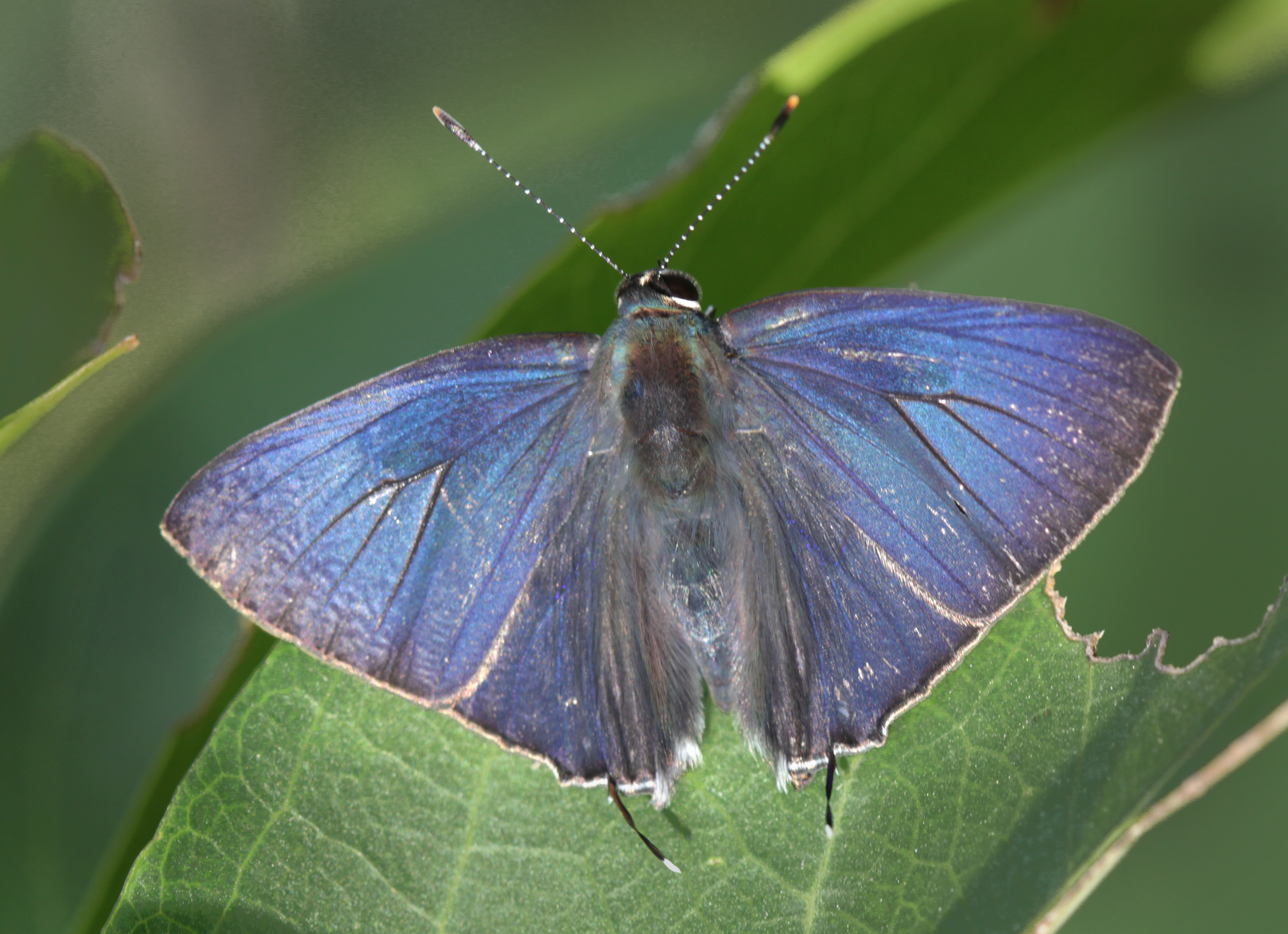
- male (upper side)
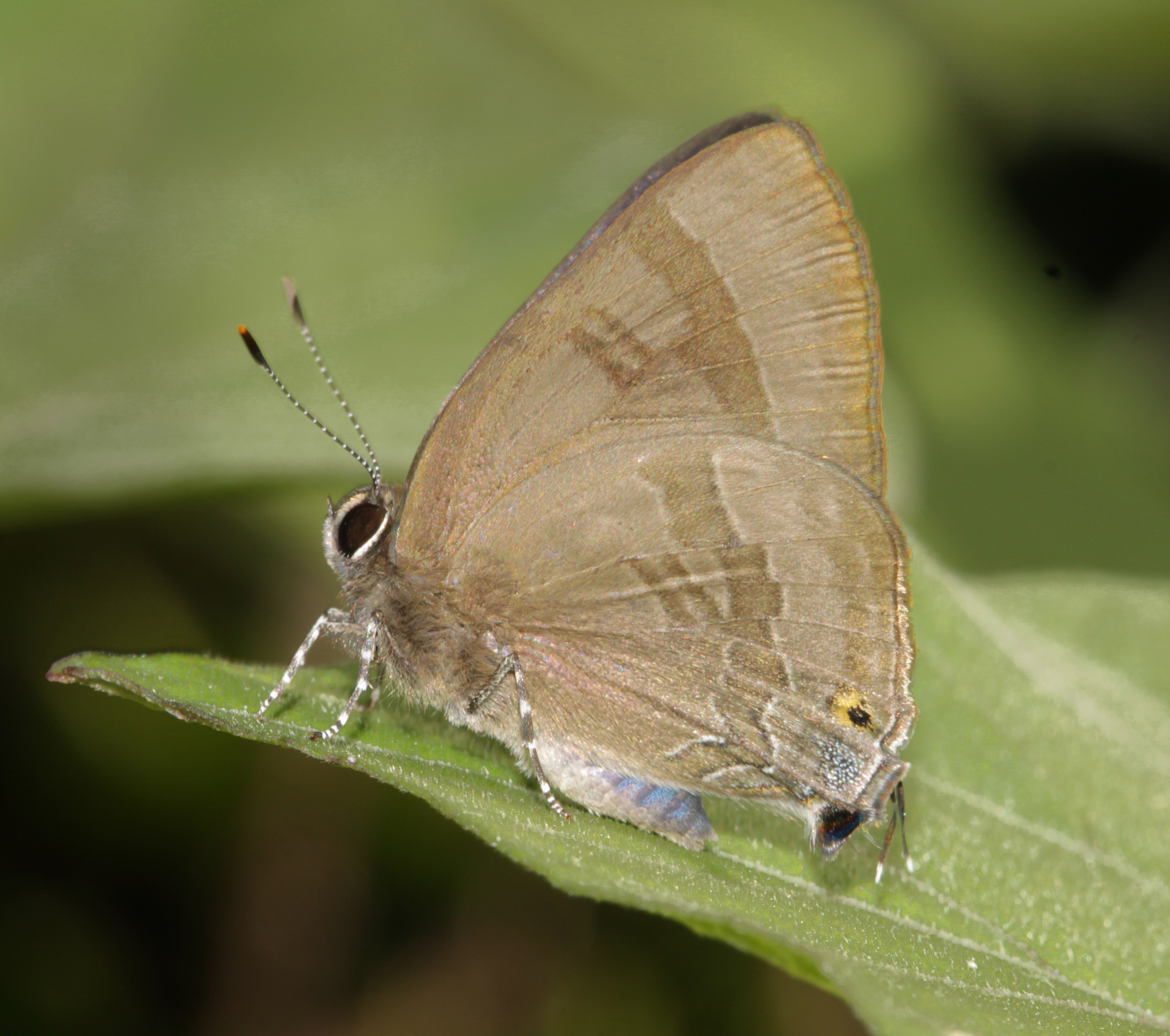
- male (underside)

Scientific classification
- Kingdom: Animalia
- Phylum: Arthropoda
- Class: Insecta
- Order: Lepidoptera
- Family: Lycaenidae
- Genus: Rapala
- Species: R. varuna

Binomial name
- Rapala varuna (Hewitson, 1863)

= Rapala varuna =

Indigo flash

Species of butterfly

Rapala varuna, the indigo flash, is a species of lycaenid or blue butterfly found in the Indomalayan realm and the Australasian realm.

== Description ==
Male. Upperside dark indigo-blue, glossed, and in certain lights with a greenish tint. Forewing with the blue colour merging into the broad black costal and outer marginal borders. Hindwing with the costal space and abdominal fold blackish, outer margin with a very narrow black band; the abdominal space outside the fold darker black than the colour of the fold; anal lobe black, with an orange spot, and a few greyish-white scales along its upper side; tail black, tipped with white. Cilia of both wings black with pale tips, with a white medial line through it from the anal lobe to vein 3. Underside rufous-brown, varying in shade of colour somewhat in different examples, markings darker brown. Forewing with a bar at the end of the cell, a moderately broad discal band from near the costa to the sub-median vein, slightly outwardly curved above its middle, in some examples with a patch of black suffusion, joining it to the discal bar; a sub-marginal narrower band. Hindwing with similar discoidal and discal bands, the latter outwardly edged with white, composed of conjoined squarish spots, passing close to the lower end of the discoidal bar, slightly outwardly curved from the costa to vein 2, where it curves inwards in a large angle to the abdominal margin a little below its middle, and is there prominently edged with white on both sides and has a short white line close below it; anal lobe black crowned with dull orange, a white anteciliary thread on the lower half of the outer margin. Antennae black, ringed with white; club tipped with red; frons black; eyes-ringed with white; head and body above and below concolorous with the wings, abdomen below ochreous. Female. Upperside paler, pale brown glossed with purple; consequently the costal and outer marginal black borders more distinct. Underside paler than the male, markings similar.

— Charles Swinhoe, Lepidoptera Indica. Vol. IX

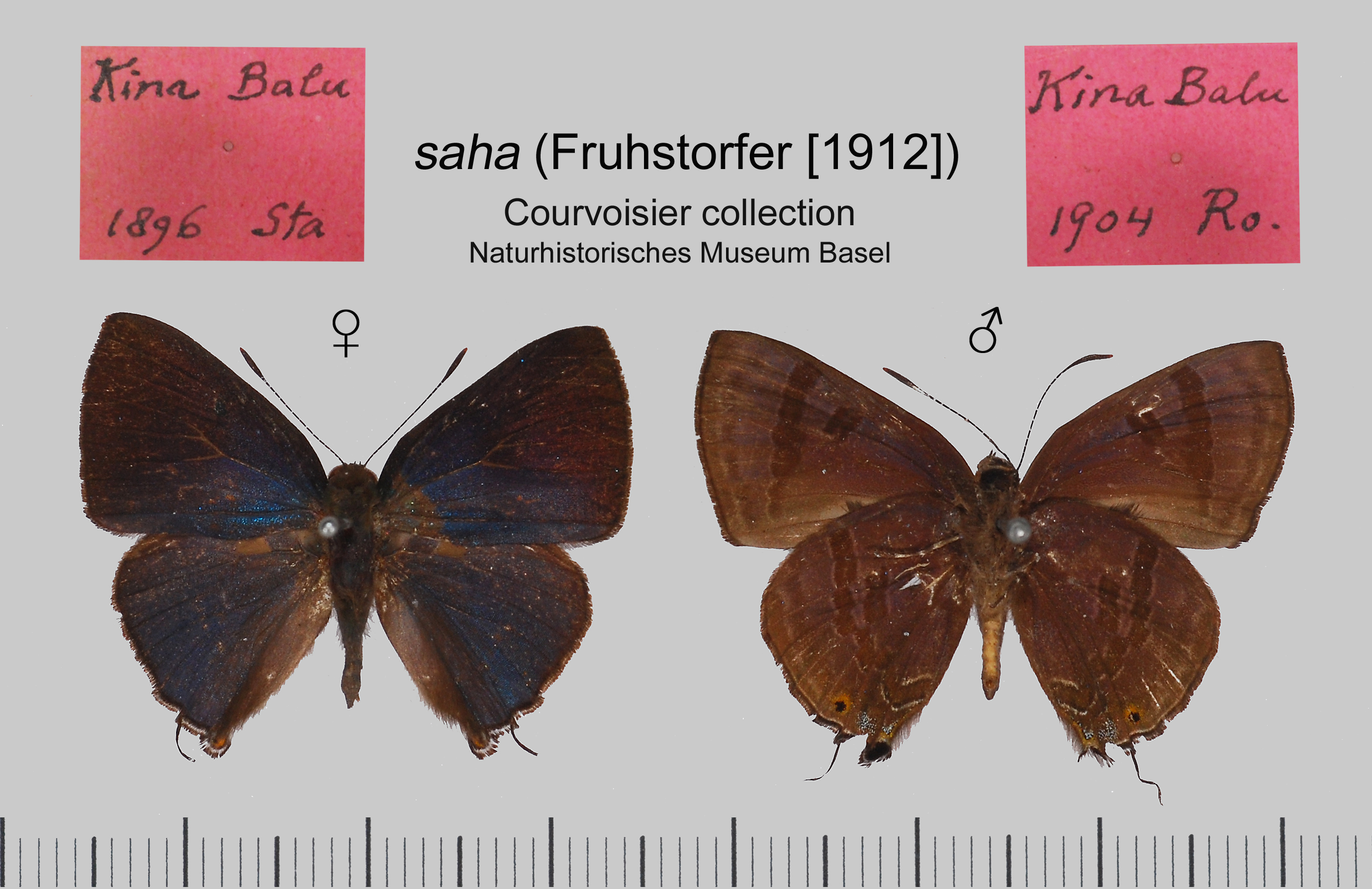
Rapala varuna saha

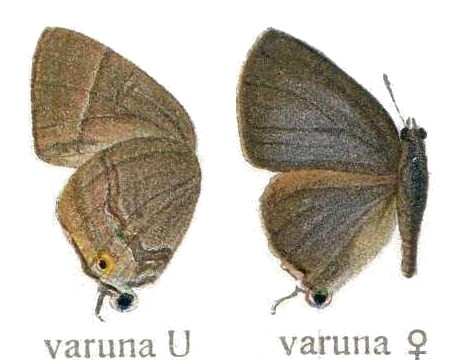
Male underside on left and female

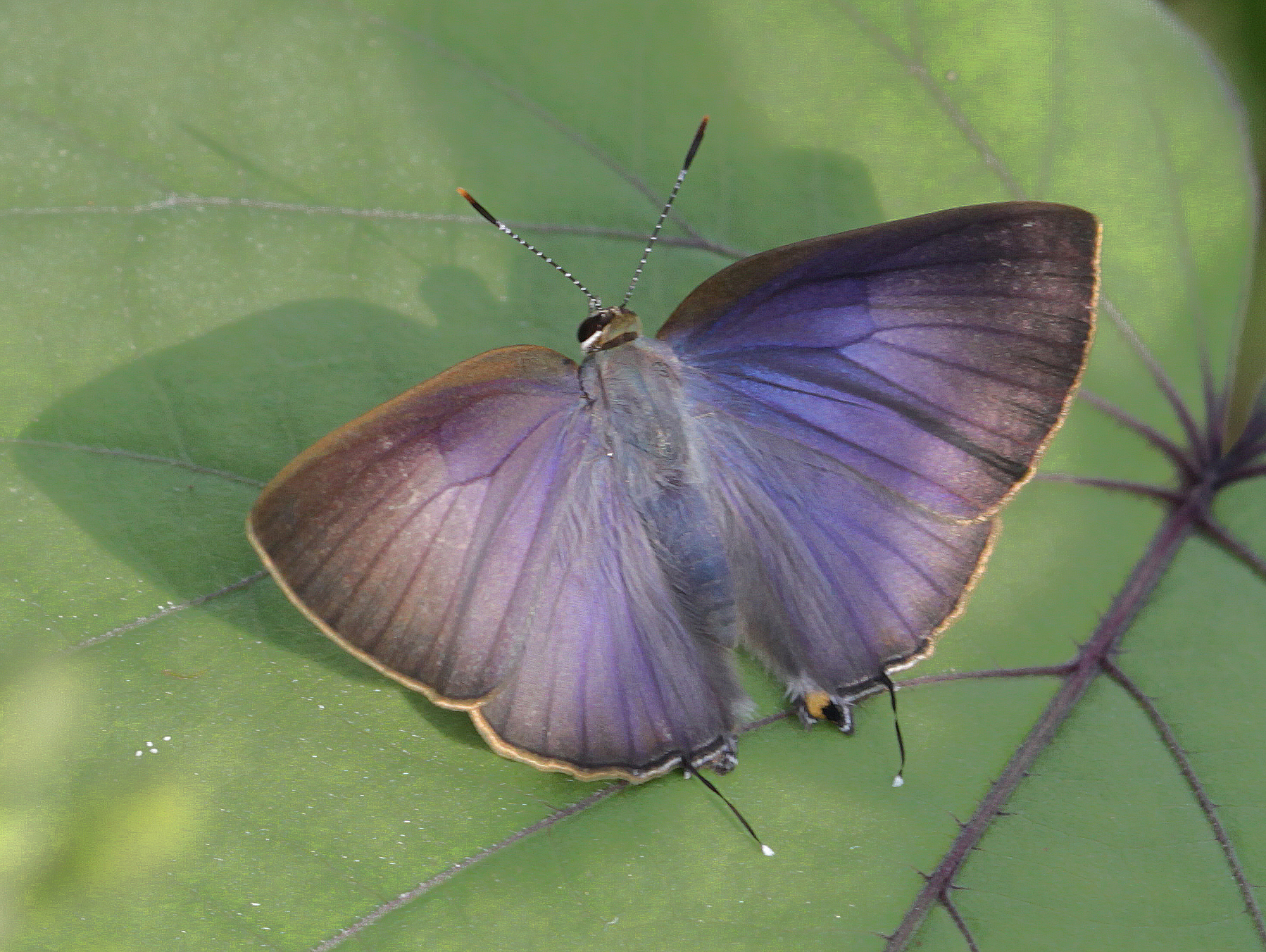
Female (upper side)

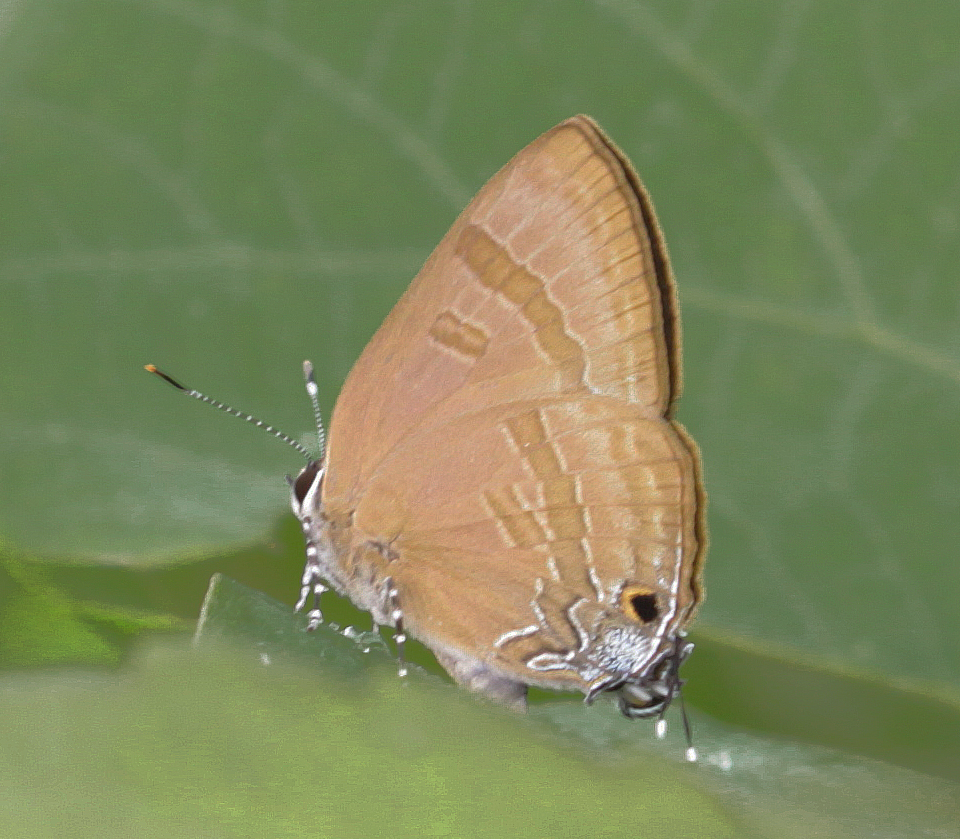
Female (underside)

== Subspecies ==
- R. v. orseis (Hewitson, 1863) Yunnan
- R. v. simsoni (Miskin, 1874) Torres Straits Island, Cape York to Brisbane, Papua, Trobriand Island
- R. v. guineensis (Staudinger, 1889) New Guinea
- R. v. olivia Druce, 1895 Sulawesi
- R. v. saha Fruhstorfer, 1912 Borneo
- R. v. sagata Fruhstorfer, 1912 Bawean
- R. v. arima Fruhstorfer, 1912 Lombok, Bali
- R. v. ambasa Fruhstorfer, 1912 Nias
- R. v. formosana Fruhstorfer, 1912 Taiwan
- R. v. nada Fruhstorfer, 1912 Palawan
- R. v. batilma Fruhstorfer, 1912 Tenimber
- R. v. gebenia Fruhstorfer, 1914 Assam
