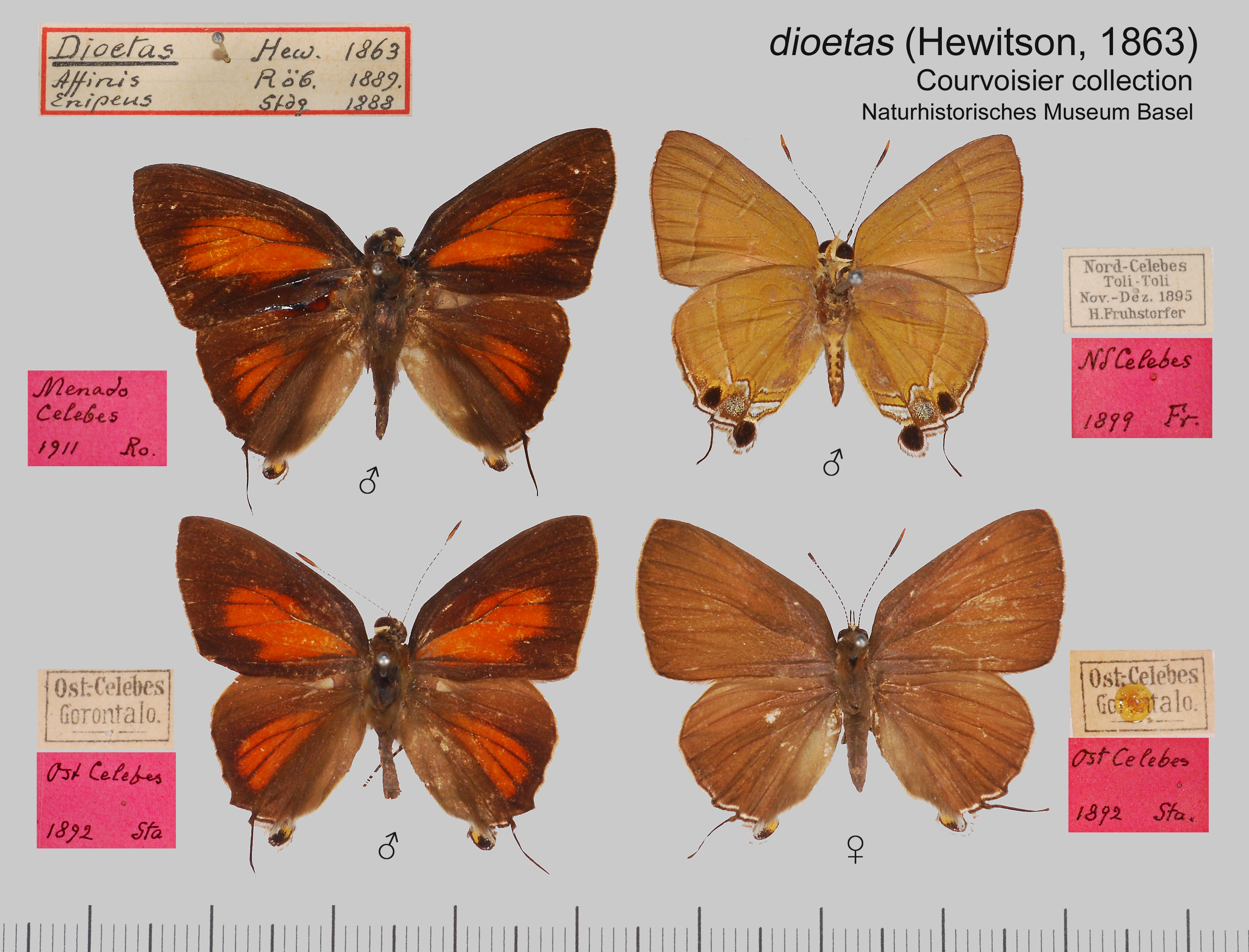
- From the Courvoisier Collection, Basel, Switzerland

Scientific classification
- Domain: Eukaryota
- Kingdom: Animalia
- Phylum: Arthropoda
- Class: Insecta
- Order: Lepidoptera
- Family: Lycaenidae
- Genus: Rapala
- Species: R. dioetas

Binomial name
- Rapala dioetas (Hewitson, 1863)

Synonyms
- Deudorix dioetas Hewitson, [1863]; Deudorix affinis Röber, 1886; Rapala zylda Seitz, [1922]; Rapala bangkaiensis Ribbe, 1926; Rapala dioetas noachis Seitz, 1927

= Rapala dioetas =

Species of butterfly

Rapala dioetas is a butterfly in the family Lycaenidae. It was observed by the British naturalist William Chapman Hewitson in 1863. It is endemic to Sulawesi (Sulawesi, Sanghihe, Talaud, Banggai and Salayar).

The larva feeds on Lagerstroemia species.
