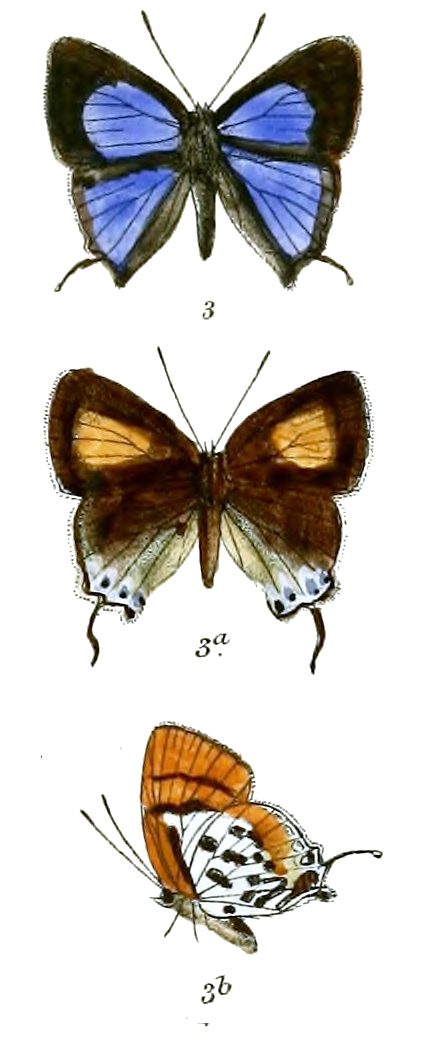
- Araotes lapithis, male, female and male underside

Scientific classification
- Kingdom: Animalia
- Phylum: Arthropoda
- Clade: Pancrustacea
- Class: Insecta
- Order: Lepidoptera
- Family: Lycaenidae
- Tribe: Deudorigini
- Genus: Araotes; Doherty, 1889

= Araotes =

Genus of butterflies

Araotes is a small Indomalayan genus of butterflies in the family Lycaenidae.

== Species ==
- Araotes lapithis (Moore, [1858]) - witch
- Araotes perrhaebis Semper, 1890 Philippines
