= Rapala rectivitta =

Scientific classification
- Kingdom: Animalia
- Phylum: Arthropoda
- Clade: Pancrustacea
- Class: Insecta
- Order: Lepidoptera
- Family: Lycaenidae
- Genus: Rapala
- Species: R. rectivitta

Binomial name
- Rapala rectivitta (Moore, 1879)

Synonyms
- Deudorix rectivitta Moore, 1879; Rapala buxaria de Nicéville, 1890

Species of butterfly

Rapala rectivitta, the shot flash, is a species of lycaenid butterfly in the genus Rapala. It occurs in the eastern Himalayas and adjoining hill country, with records from Nepal, northeastern India and Bhutan. The species is easily confused with its close relatives R. nissa and R. huangi.

== Taxonomy ==
The species was described by Frederic Moore in 1879 as Deudorix rectivitta, from a specimen collected in North Cachar in what is now Assam, India. It was later transferred to Rapala Moore, 1881.

== Description ==
The wingspan is 30–35 mm.

Males are a deep blue above, and the iridescence of this colour is retained even when the wings are viewed from a very oblique angle—a useful distinction from R. nissa, in which the purplish-blue sheen disappears at such angles. Unlike R. nissa, males of R. rectivitta lack an orange patch on the upperside of the forewing. Females are a paler blue above.

On the underside the ground colour ranges from brown to purplish. The postdiscal band carries a bronze tone at its centre, as in R. nissa, but is generally darker, more even, and edged more in brown than in white. The width of the band is variable, ranging from broad and apparently double to narrow and single, and its colour varies from dark to light brown.

In the male genitalia, the aedeagus tip has serrated distal margin that projects to one side; the valvae are short and broad with blunt tips, and the cleft between them is less than half the length of the valval plate.

== Distribution ==
Rapala rectivitta is known from Nepal, northeastern India, and Bhutan.
