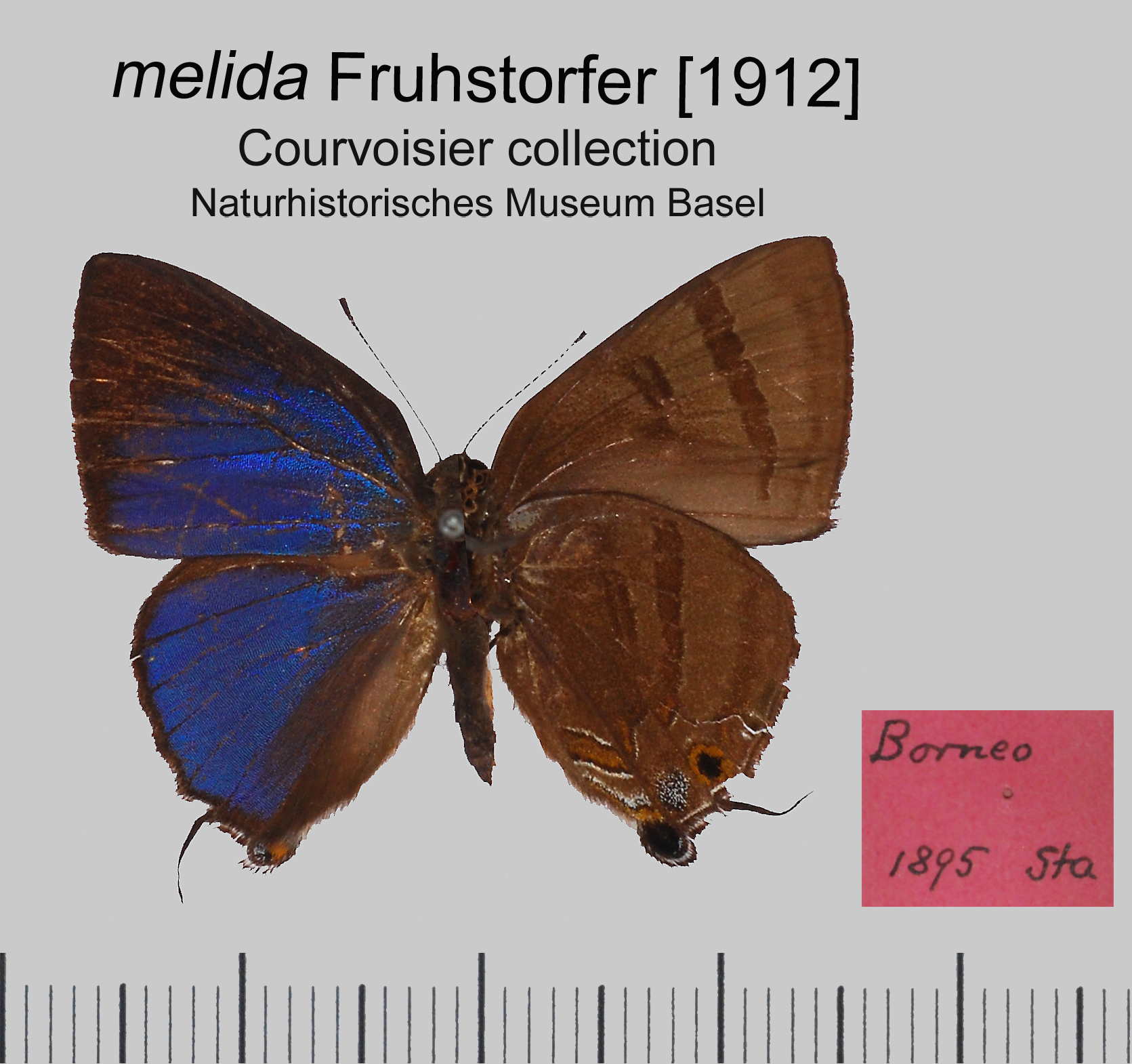
- Rapala melida Courvoisier Collection, Basel

Scientific classification
- Domain: Eukaryota
- Kingdom: Animalia
- Phylum: Arthropoda
- Class: Insecta
- Order: Lepidoptera
- Family: Lycaenidae
- Genus: Rapala
- Species: R. melida

Binomial name
- Rapala melida Fruhstorfer, [1912].

Synonyms
- Rapala sphinx melida Fruhstorfer, [1912]

= Rapala melida =

Species of butterfly

Rapala melida or Frustorfer's Flash, is a butterfly in the family Lycaenidae. It was described by Hans Fruhstorfer in 1912. It is found in the Indomalayan realm.

== Subspecies ==
- R. m. melida (Borneo)
- R. m. palawanica Schröder & Treadaway, 2000 (Philippines)
