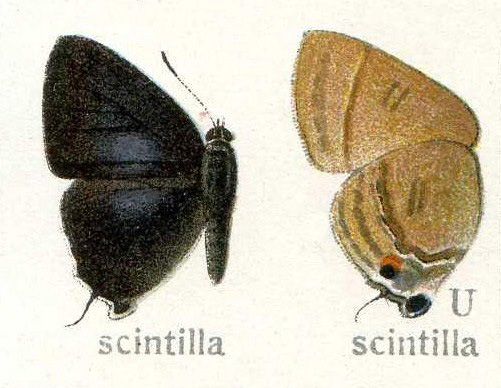

Scientific classification
- Kingdom: Animalia
- Phylum: Arthropoda
- Class: Insecta
- Order: Lepidoptera
- Family: Lycaenidae
- Genus: Rapala
- Species: R. scintilla

Binomial name
- Rapala scintilla (de Nicéville, 1890)

= Rapala scintilla =

Scarce slate flash

Species of butterfly

Rapala scintilla, the scarce slate flash, is a species of lycaenid or blue butterfly found in the Indomalayan realm.

== Subspecies ==
- R. s. scintilla North India, Sikkim, Assam - Peninsular Malaya, Thailand
- R. s. nemana Semper, 1890 Philippines (Mindanao)
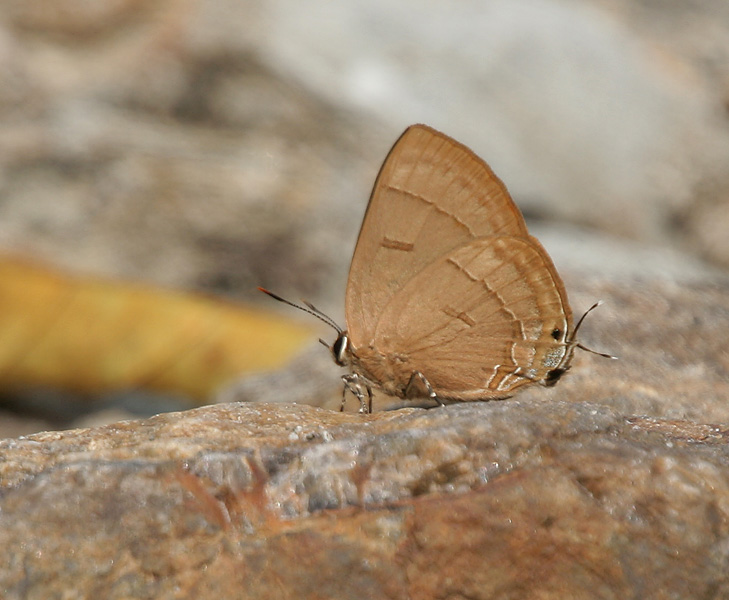
At Jayanti in Buxa Tiger Reserve in Jalpaiguri district of West Bengal, India

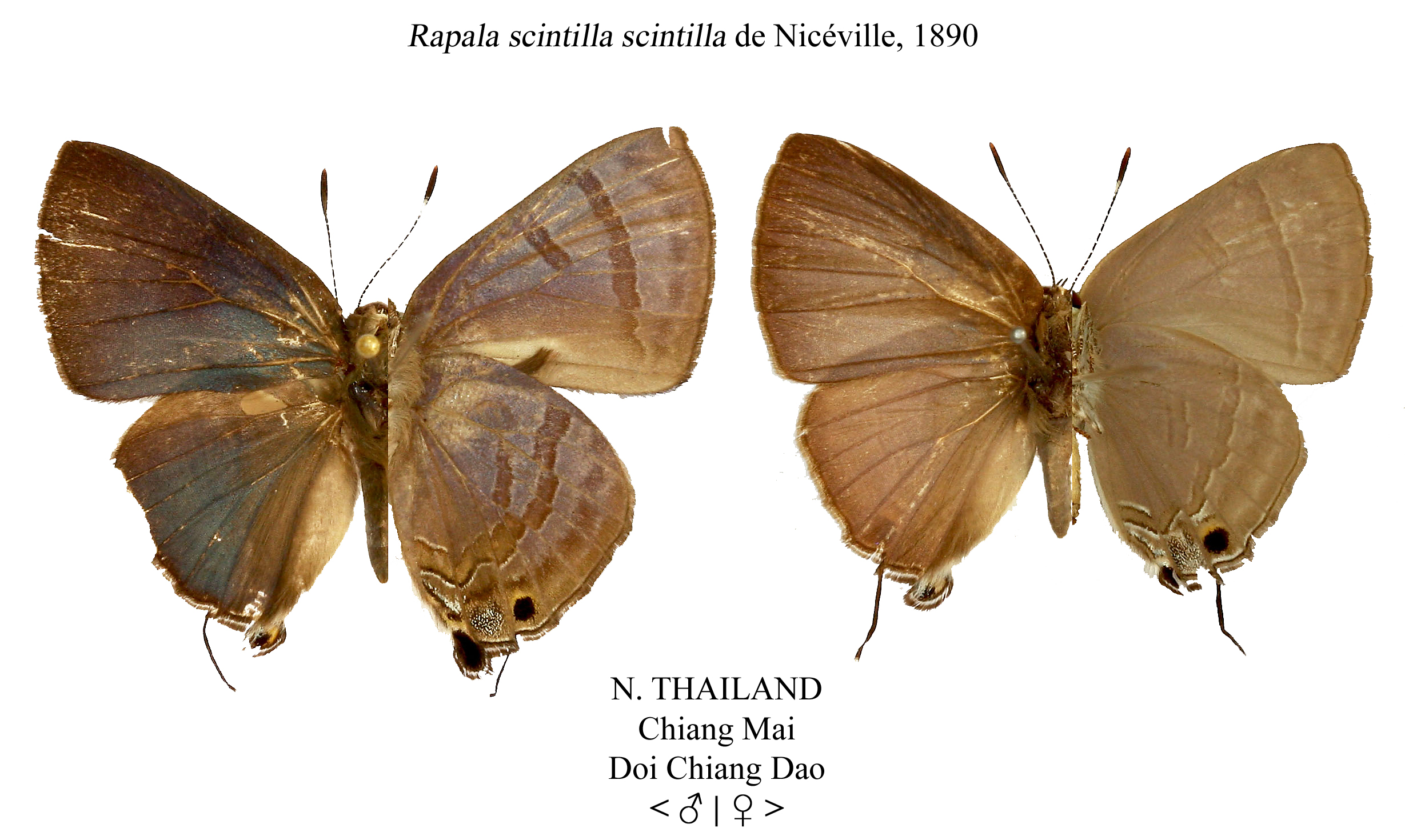
Male and female

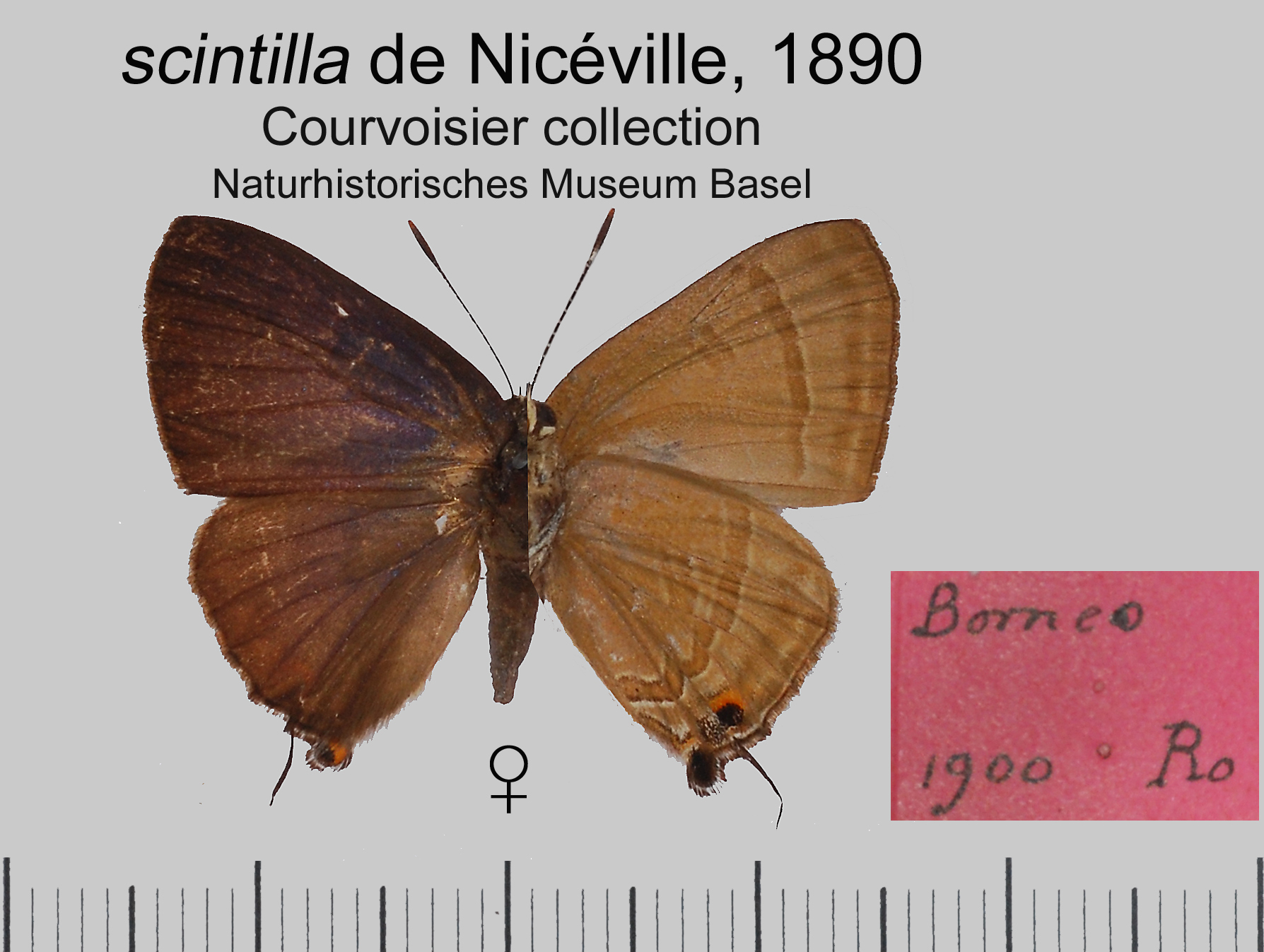
Female from the Courvoisier Collection, Basel, Switzerland
