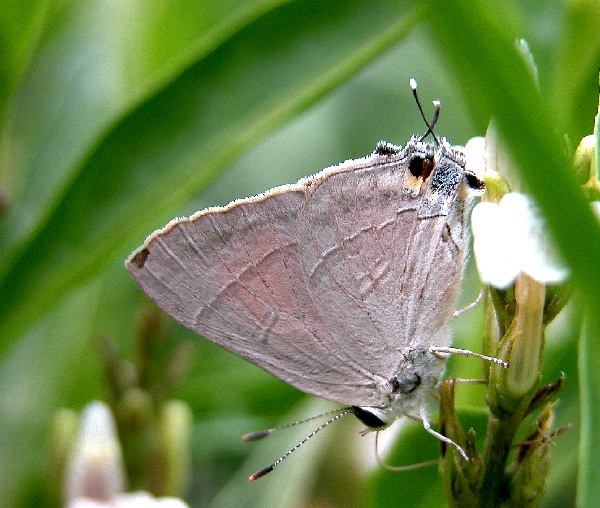

Scientific classification
- Kingdom: Animalia
- Phylum: Arthropoda
- Class: Insecta
- Order: Lepidoptera
- Family: Lycaenidae
- Genus: Rapala
- Species: R. iarbus

Binomial name
- Rapala iarbus (Fabricius, 1787)

Synonyms
- Rapala jarbas Fabricius

= Rapala iarbus =

Indian red flash

Species of butterfly

Rapala iarbus, the common red flash, is a species of lycaenid butterfly found in South. and Southeast Asia.

It is a small sized butterfly with a wingspan of 3.3 to 4.1 cms. It is found across India except in the arid regions of Northwest and Northeast.

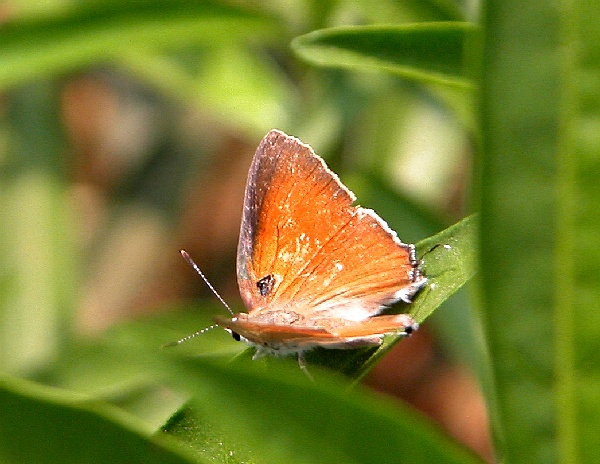

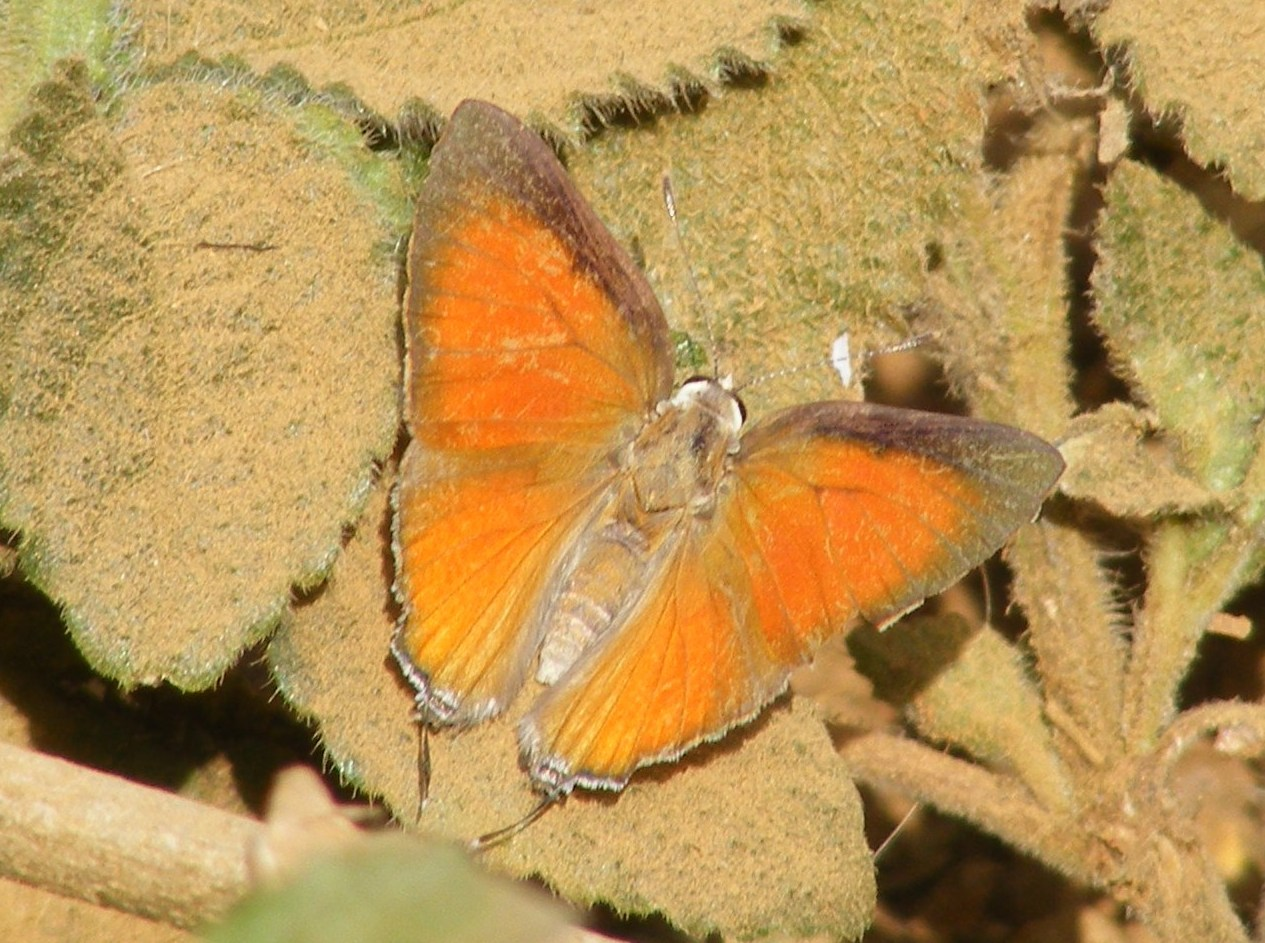

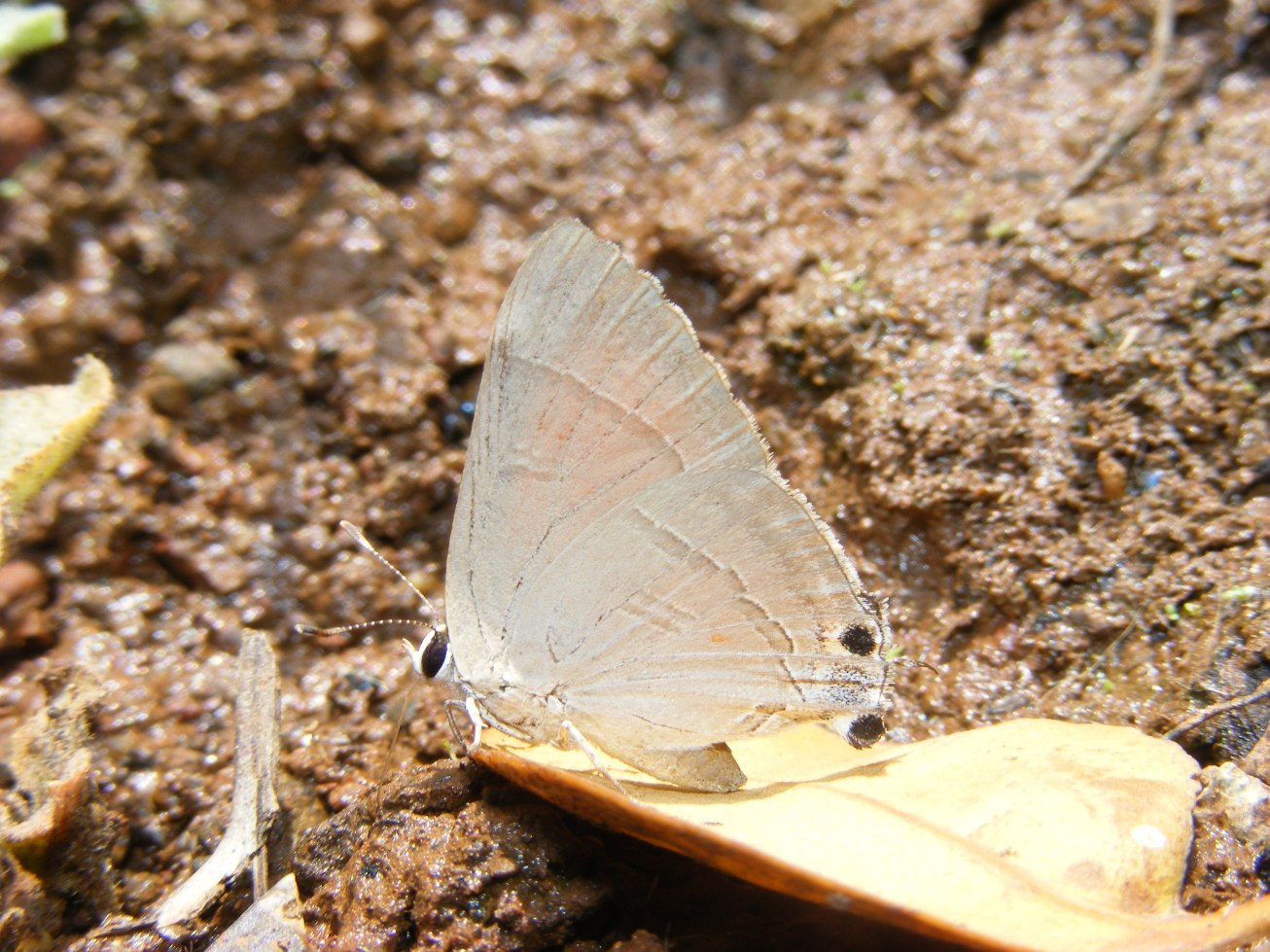
