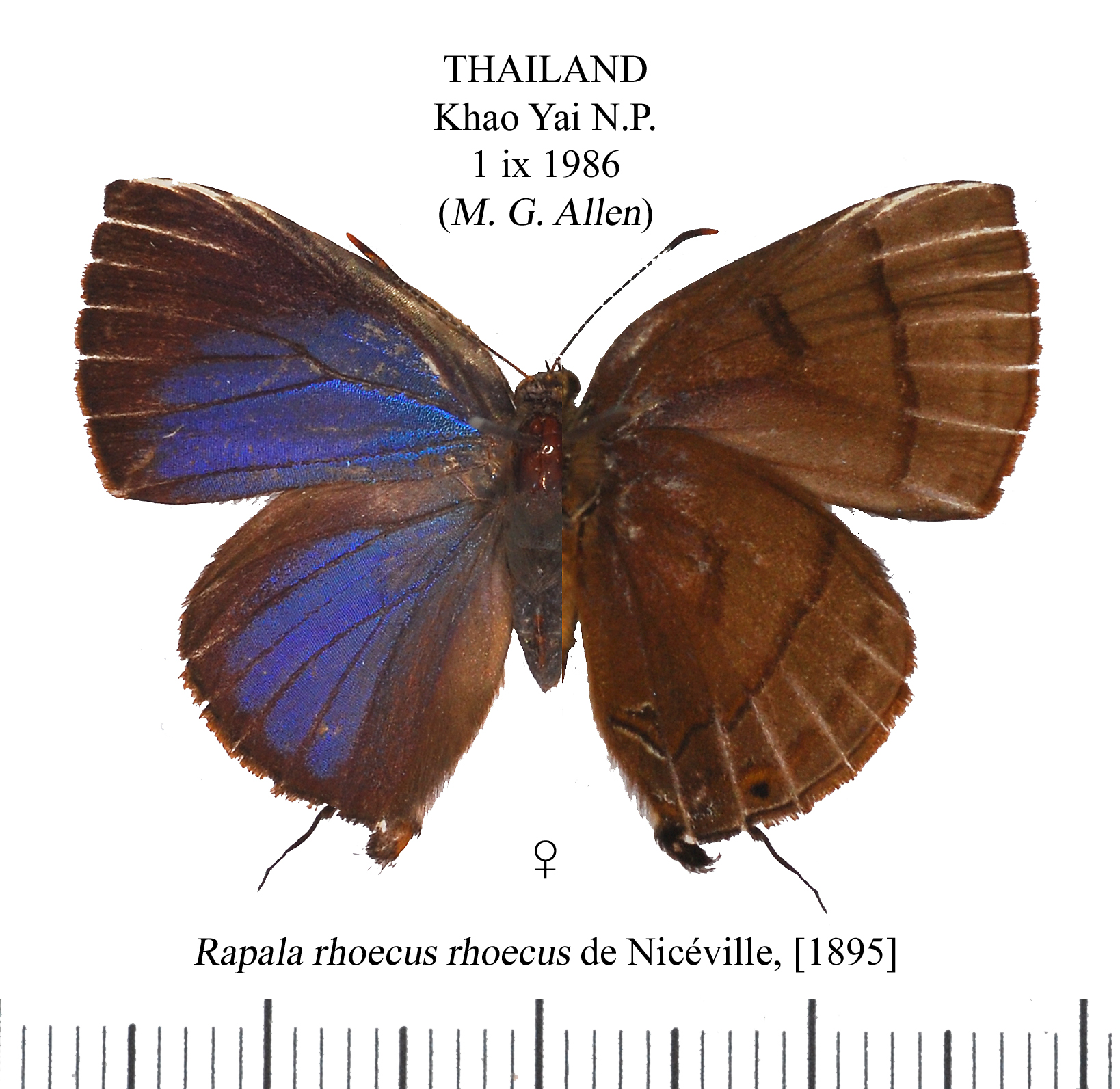

Scientific classification
- Domain: Eukaryota
- Kingdom: Animalia
- Phylum: Arthropoda
- Class: Insecta
- Order: Lepidoptera
- Family: Lycaenidae
- Genus: Rapala
- Species: R. rhoecus

Binomial name
- Rapala rhoecus de Nicéville, 1895

Synonyms
- Rapala nicevillei Swinhoe, [1912]; Rapala sphinx intermedia Ollenbach, 1921; Rapala elcia rhoecus; Deudorix sphinx Piepers & Snellen, 1918; Rapala elcia vajana Corbet, 1940

= Rapala rhoecus =

Species of butterfly

Rapala rhoecus is a butterfly in the family Lycaenidae. It was described by Lionel de Nicéville in 1895. It is found in the Indomalayan realm.

== Subspecies ==
- Rapala rhoecus rhoecus (Thailand, Malay Peninsula, Sumatra)
- Rapala rhoecus vajana Corbet, 1940 (Java)
