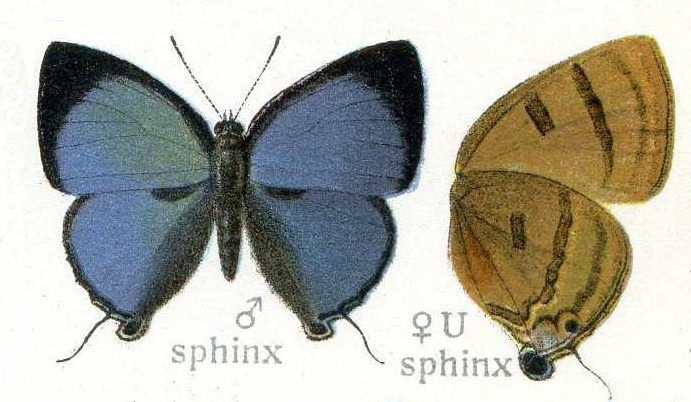

Scientific classification
- Kingdom: Animalia
- Phylum: Arthropoda
- Class: Insecta
- Order: Lepidoptera
- Family: Lycaenidae
- Genus: Rapala
- Species: R. sphinx

Binomial name
- Rapala sphinx (Fabricius, 1775)

= Rapala sphinx =

Brilliant flash

Species of butterfly

Rapala sphinx, the brilliant flash, is a species of lycaenid or blue butterfly found in Asia.
