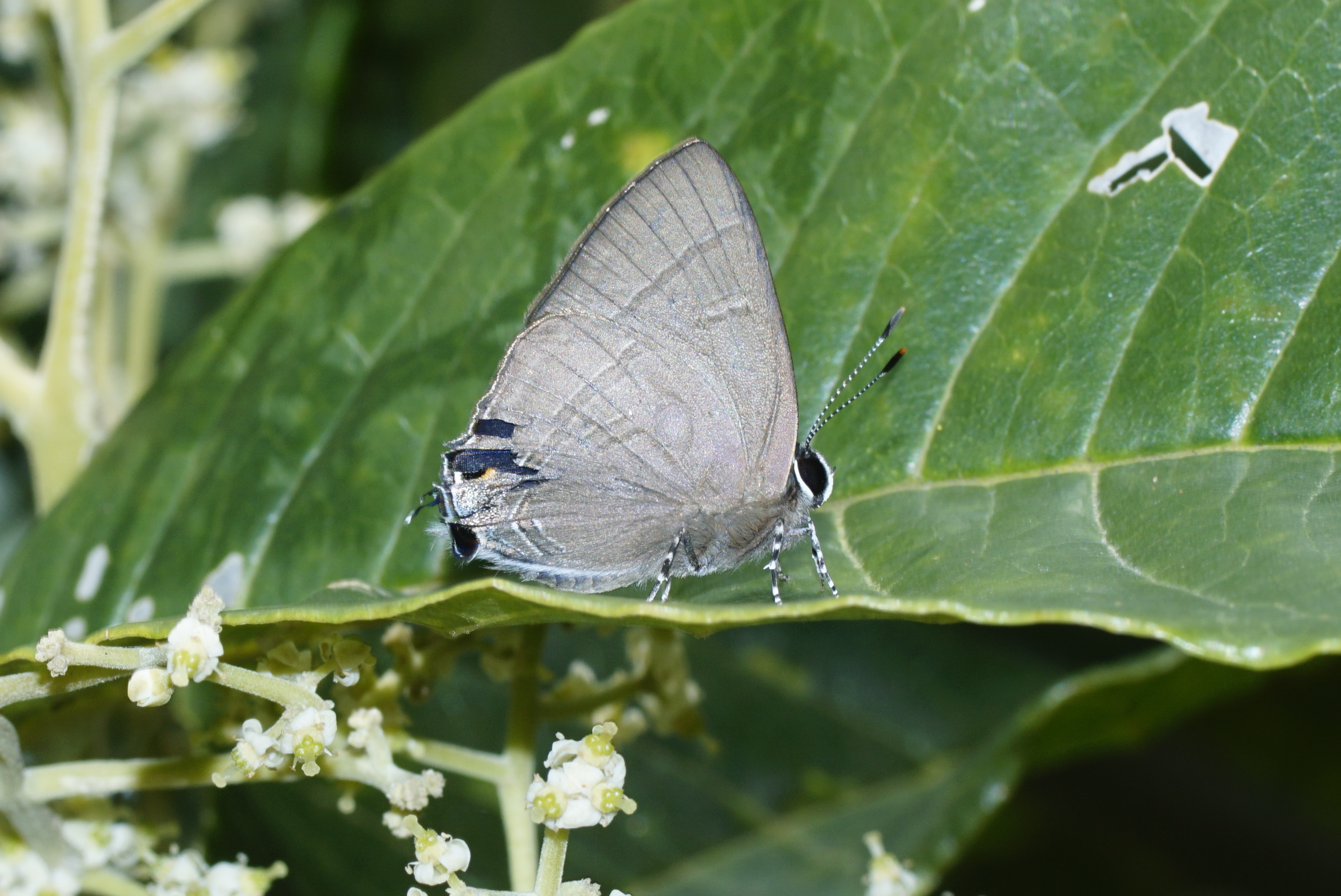
- Male
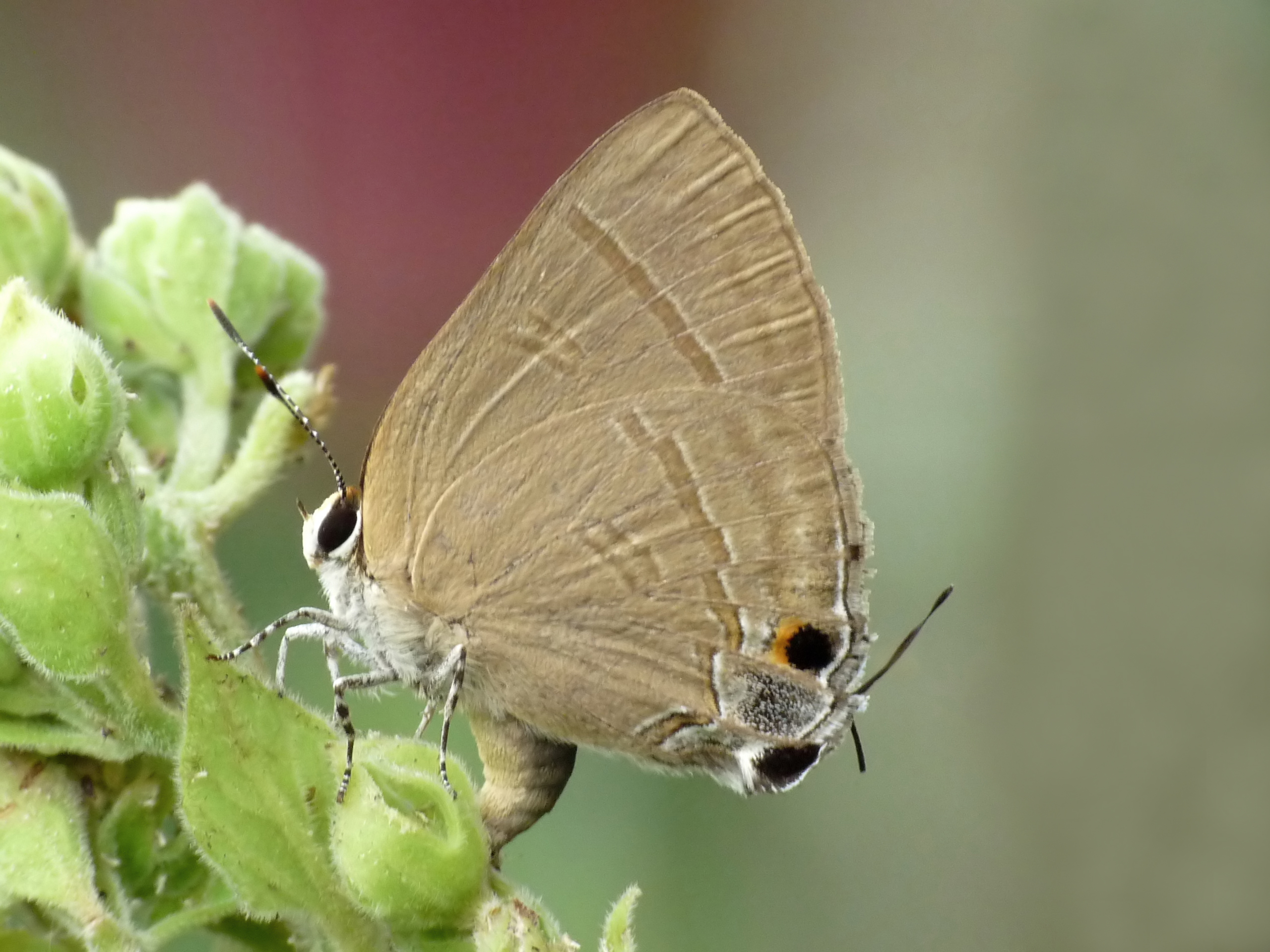
- Female

Scientific classification
- Kingdom: Animalia
- Phylum: Arthropoda
- Class: Insecta
- Order: Lepidoptera
- Family: Lycaenidae
- Genus: Rapala
- Species: R. manea

Binomial name
- Rapala manea (Hewitson, [1863])

Synonyms
- Deudorix manea Hewitson, 1863; Deudorix chozeba Hewitson, 1863

= Rapala manea =

Species of butterfly

Rapala manea, slate flash, is a butterfly of the family Lycaenidae. It is found in most of the Indomalayan realm (excluding Taiwan).

The wingspan is 24–26 mm.

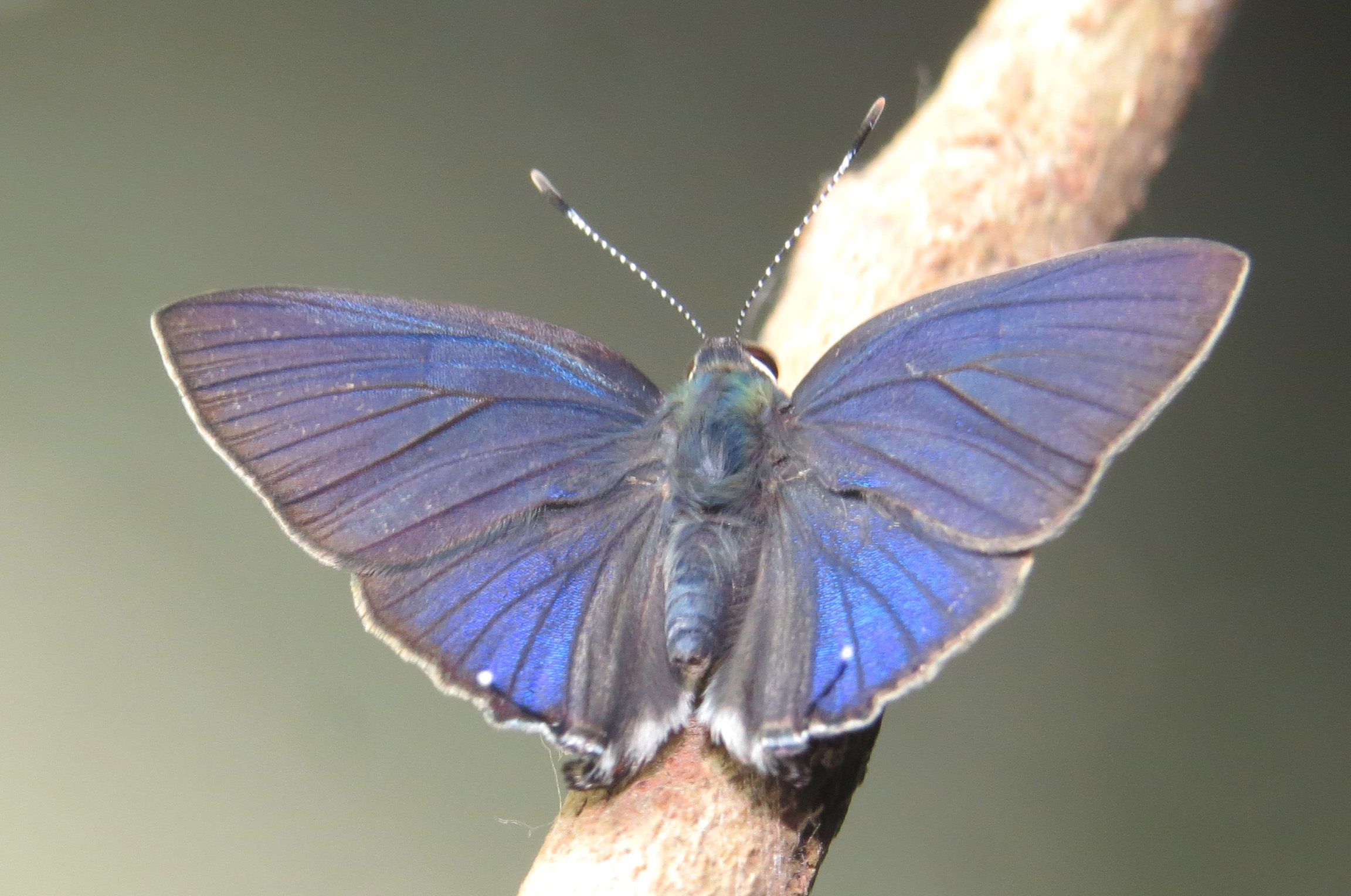
Upperside, male

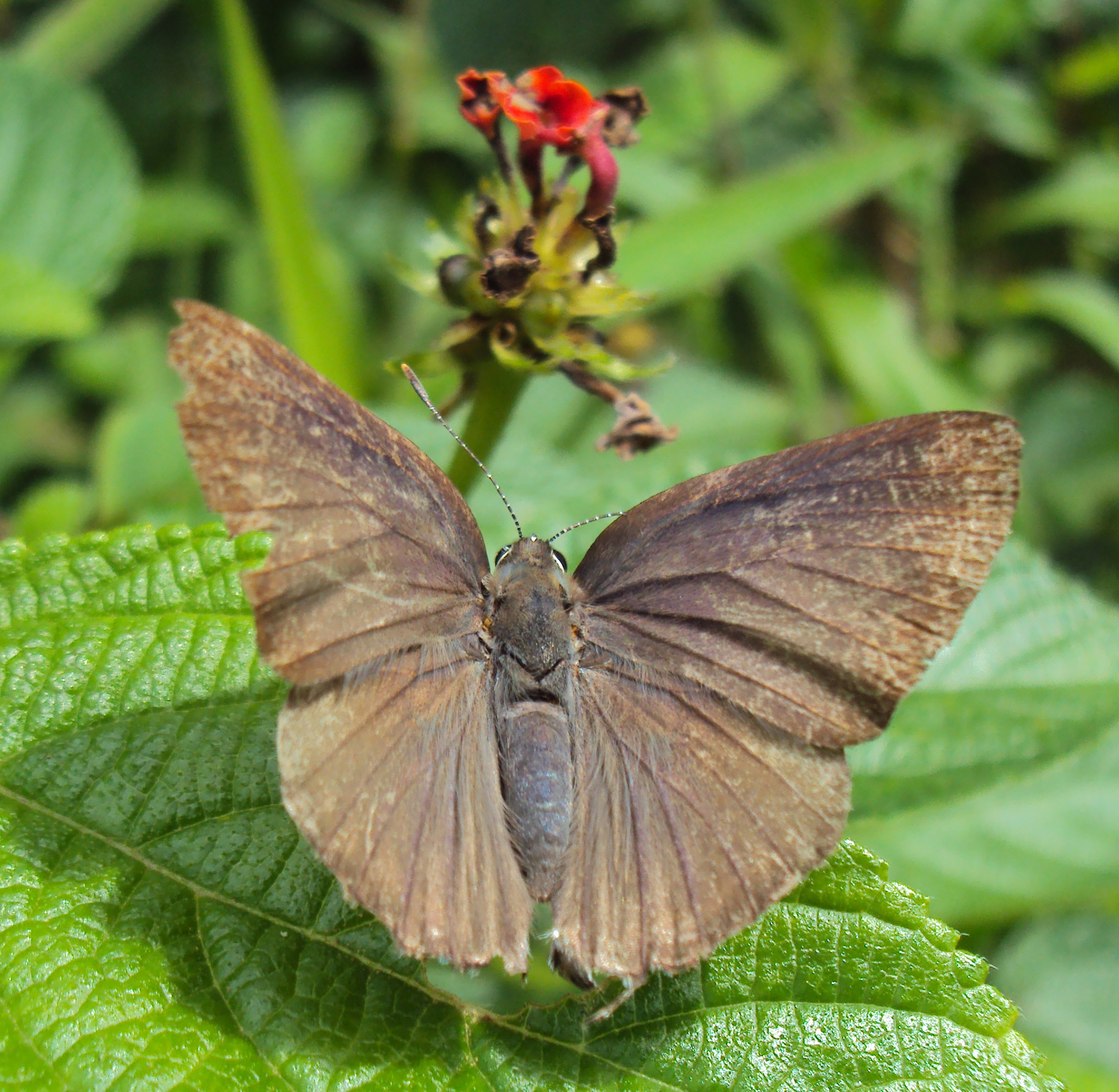
Upperside, female

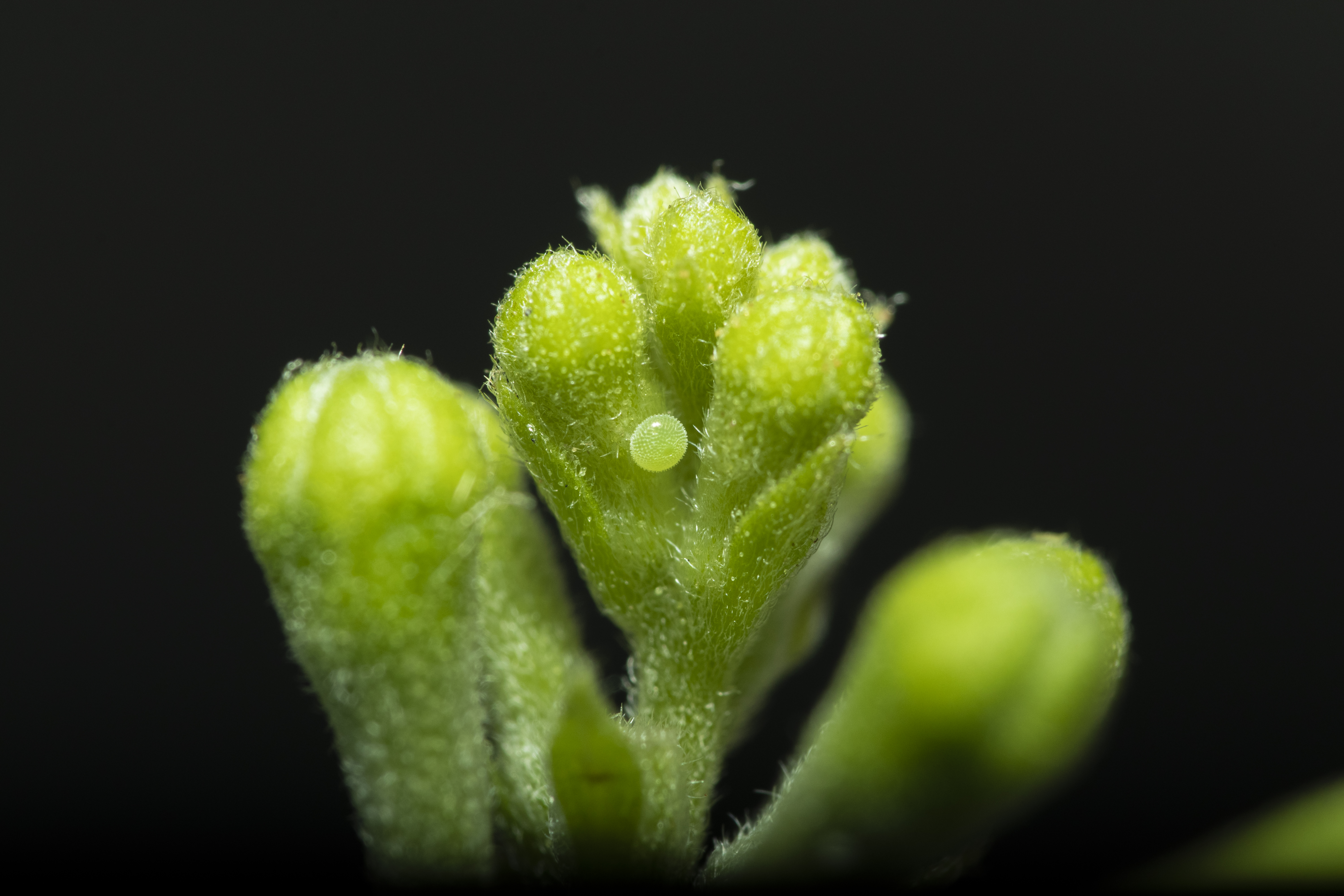
Eggs

The larvae of subspecies R. m. schistacea feed on the flowers of Rosaceae, Euphorbiaceae, Combretaceae and Leguminosae species, including Quisqualis indica and Acacia caesia.

== Subspecies ==
- Rapala manea manea (Sulawesi)
- Rapala manea schistacea (Moore, 1879) (India to northern Thailand, Sri Lanka, southern Yunnan, possibly the Andamans)
- Rapala manea chozeba (Hewitson, 1863) (southern Thailand to Singapore, Sumatra, possibly Borneo)
- Rapala manea asikana Fruhstorfer, 1912 (Java, possibly Bali)
- Rapala manea enganica Fruhstorfer, 1912 (Enggano)
- Rapala manea lombokiana Fruhstorfer, 1912 (Lombok)
- Rapala manea baweanica Fruhstorfer, 1912 (Bawean)
- Rapala manea philippinensis Fruhstorfer, 1912 (Philippines:Luzon, Mindanao, Palawan)
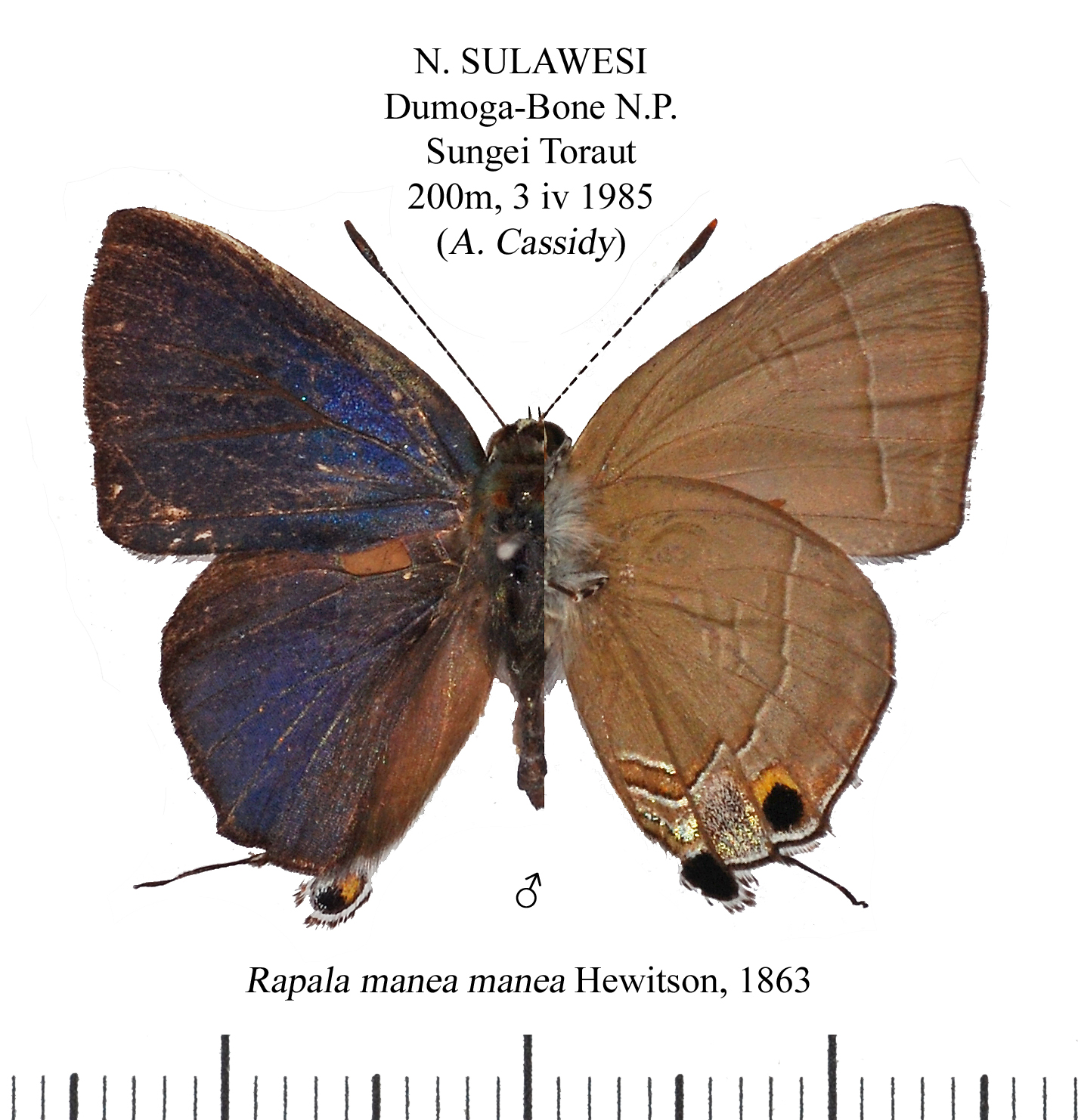
Rapala manea manea Sulawesi

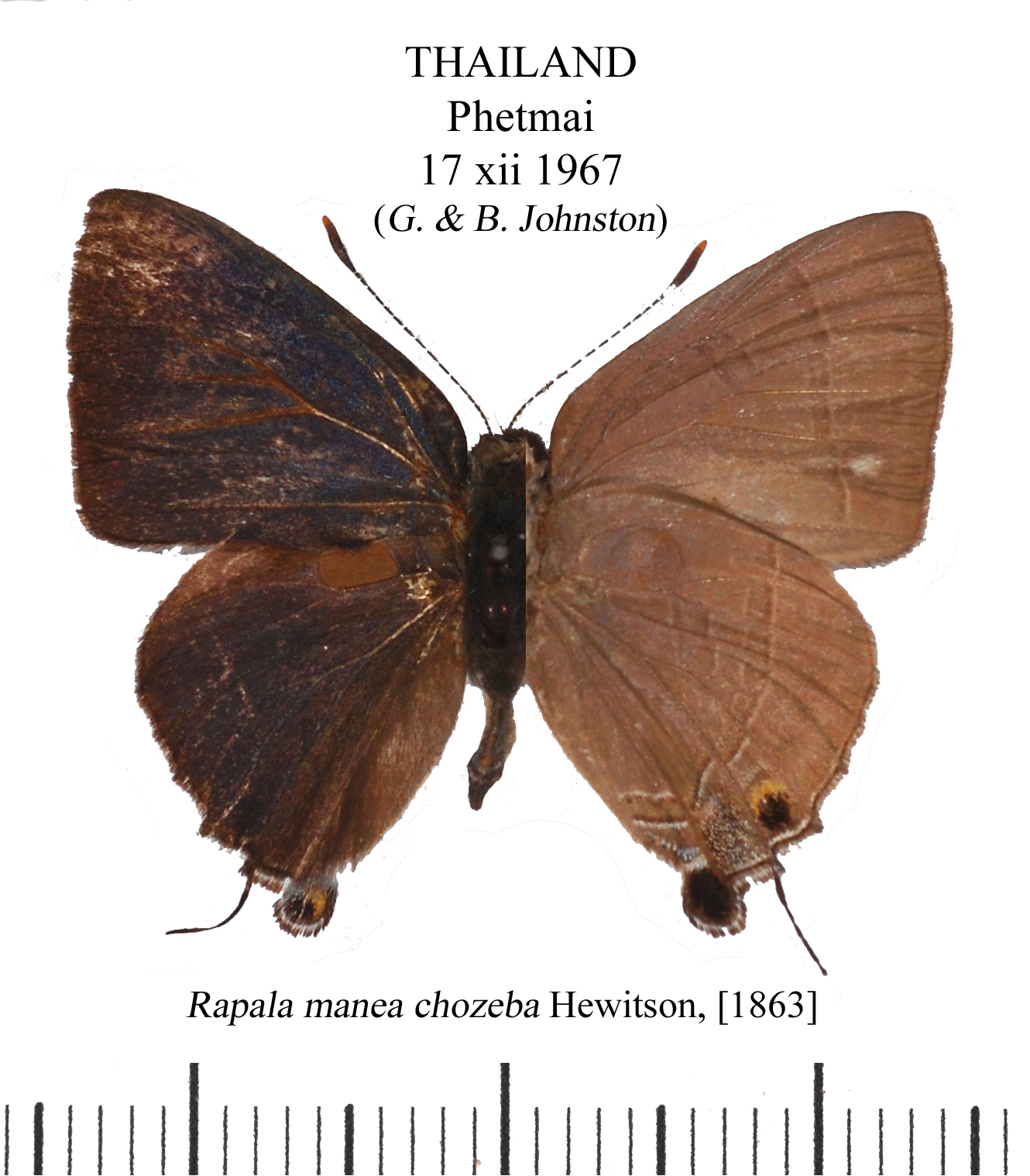
Rapala manea chozeba Thailand

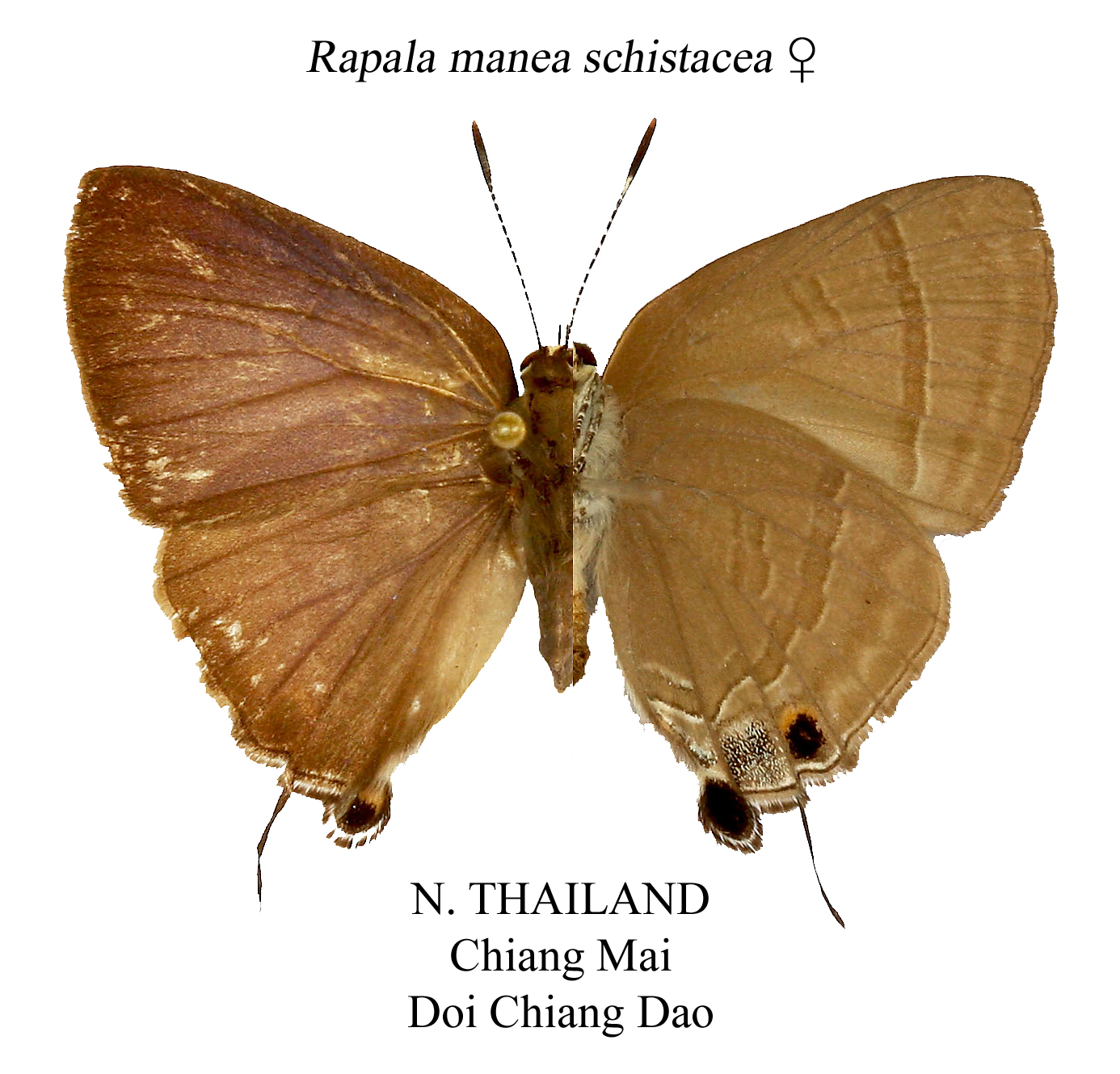
Rapala manea schistacea Thailand

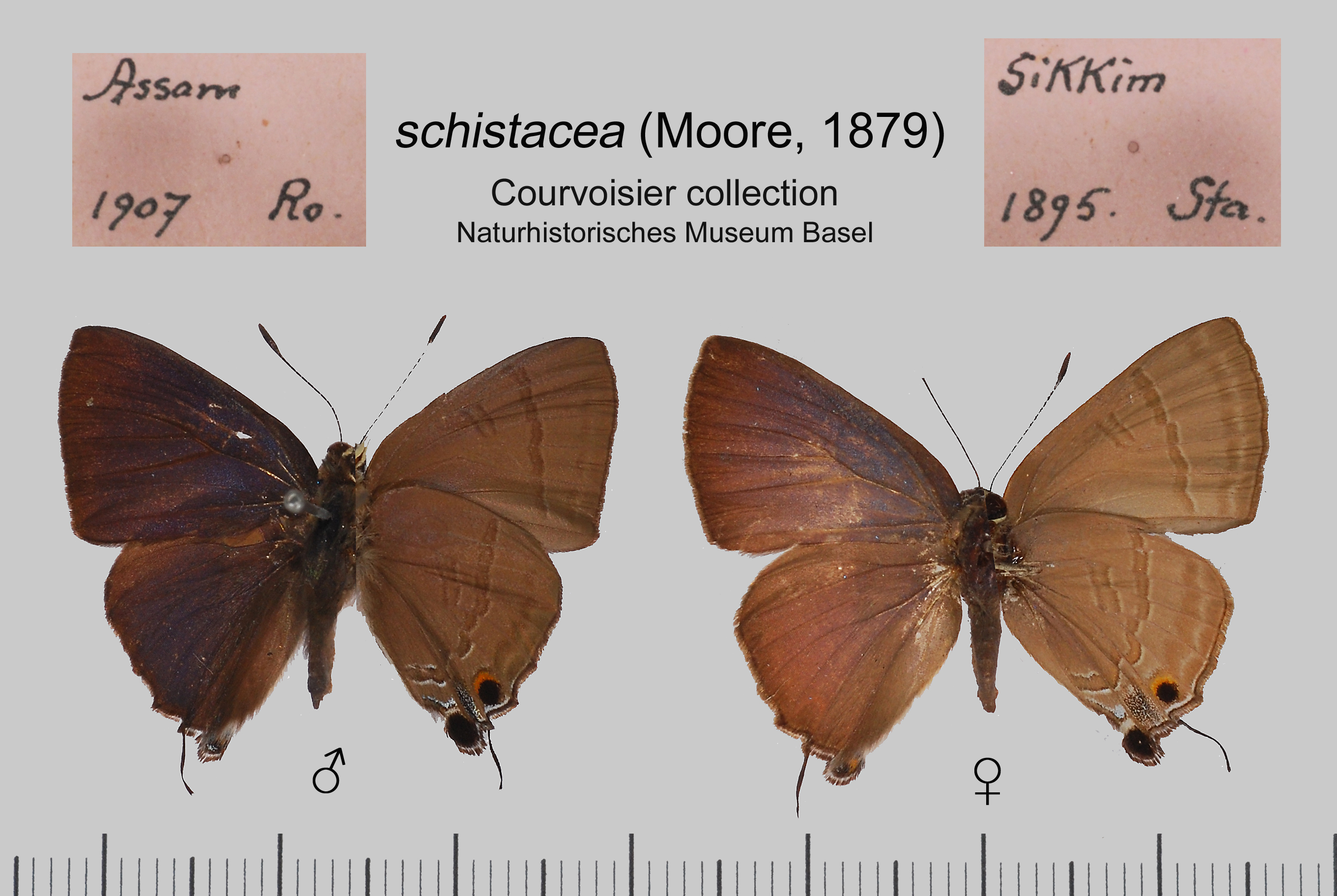
Rapala manea schistacea Sikkim, Assam, from the Courvoisier Collection, Basel, Switzerland
