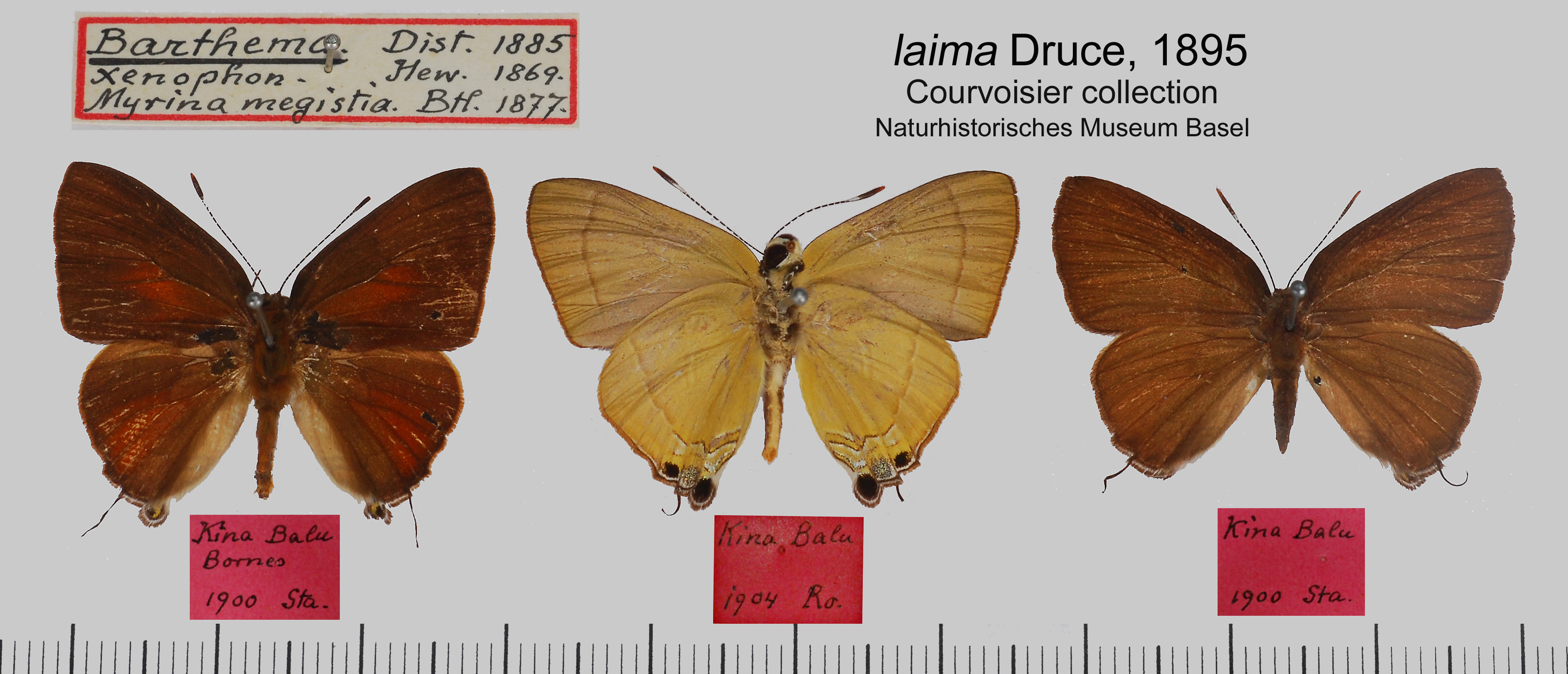
- R. s. laima Courvoisier Collection, Basel

Scientific classification
- Kingdom: Animalia
- Phylum: Arthropoda
- Class: Insecta
- Order: Lepidoptera
- Family: Lycaenidae
- Genus: Rapala
- Species: R. suffusa

Binomial name
- Rapala suffusa (Moore, 1878)

= Rapala suffusa =

Suffused flash

Species of butterfly

Rapala suffusa, the suffused flash, is a lycaenid or blue butterfly found in Myanmar, northern India, Assam, Thailand, Indochina and Palawan. The species was first described by Frederic Moore in 1878.

== Subspecies ==
- R. s. suffusa northern India, Assam, Thailand, Indochina
- R. s. laima H. H. Druce, 1895 Borneo
- R. s. praxeas Fruhstorfer, 1914 Java
- R. s. catulus Fruhstorfer, 1912 Nias
- R. s. barthema (Distant, 1885)
- R. s. anabasis (Staudinger, 1889) Palawan
