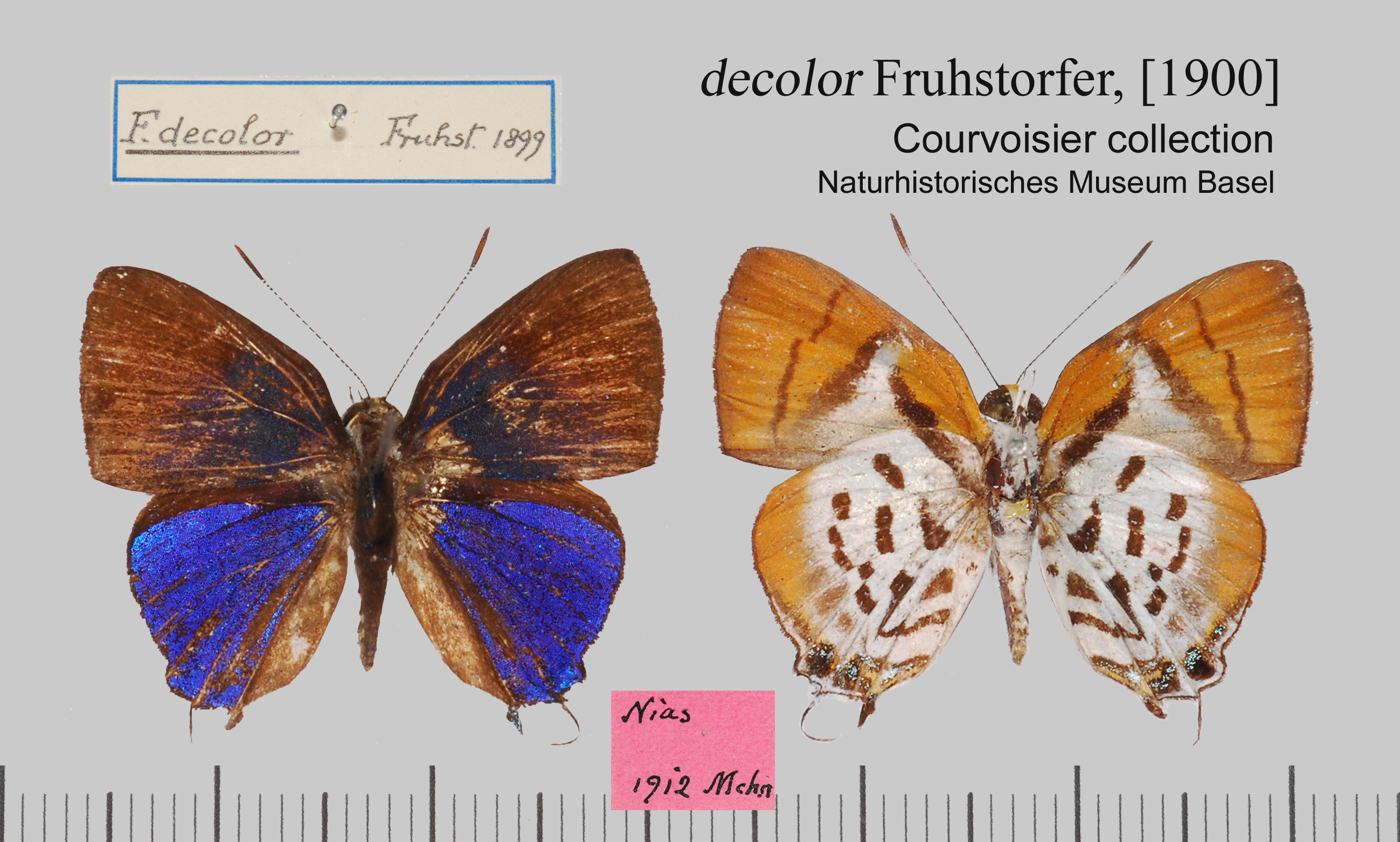
- Araotes lapithis decolor Courvoisier Collection, Basel

Scientific classification
- Kingdom: Animalia
- Phylum: Arthropoda
- Class: Insecta
- Order: Lepidoptera
- Family: Lycaenidae
- Genus: Araotes
- Species: A. lapithis

Binomial name
- Araotes lapithis (Moore, 1857)

= Araotes lapithis =

Witch

Species of butterfly

Araotes lapithis, the witch, is a small butterfly found in the Indomalayan realm that belongs to the lycaenids or blues family. The species was first described by Frederic Moore in 1857.

== Subspecies ==
- A. l. lapithis Sikkim, Assam - South China, West Thailand, Myanmar
- A. l. uruwela Fruhstorfer, 1912 southern Thailand, Peninsular Malaya, Langkawi, Singapore, Borneo
- A. l. arianus Fruhstorfer, 1912 Palawan
- A. l. decolor Fruhstorfer, 1899 Nias
- A. l. archytas Fruhstorfer, 1912 Java
