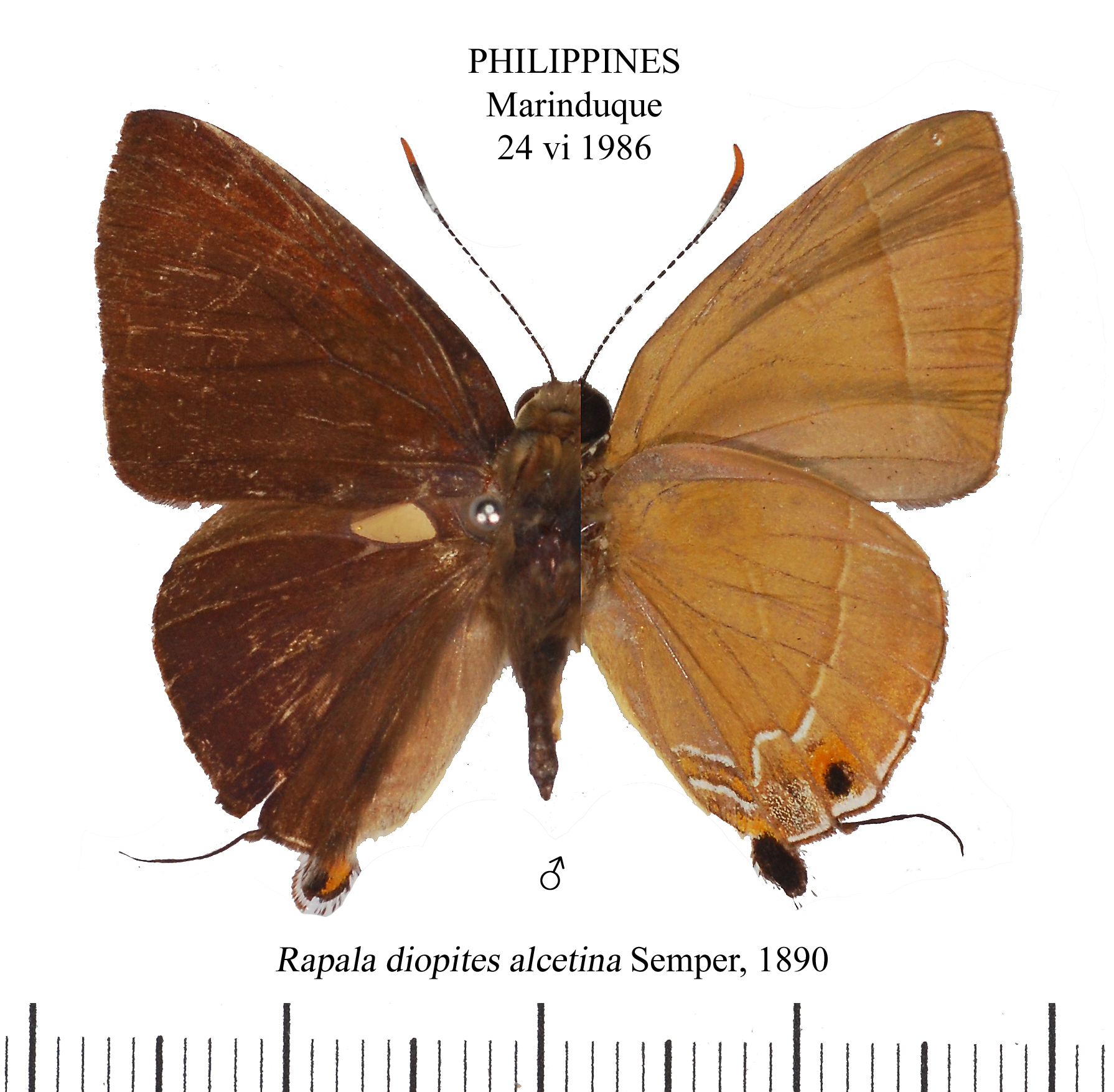
- Rapala diopites alcetina

Scientific classification
- Kingdom: Animalia
- Phylum: Arthropoda
- Class: Insecta
- Order: Lepidoptera
- Family: Lycaenidae
- Genus: Rapala
- Species: R. diopites

Binomial name
- Rapala diopites (Hewitson, 1869)

Synonyms
- Deudorix diopites Hewitson, 1869; Deudorix alcetas Staudinger, 1889; Rapala alcetas; Rapala alcetas var. alcetina Semper, 1890; Rapala alcetas bandatara Fruhstorfer, [1912]; Rapala tara ashinensis Murayama & Okamura, 1973

= Rapala diopites =

Species of butterfly

Rapala diopites is a species of butterfly of the family Lycaenidae. It is found on the Philippines.

== Subspecies ==
- Rapala diopites diopites
- Rapala diopites alcetas (Staudinger, 1889) (Philippines: Palawan, Luzon)
- Rapala diopites alcetina (Semper, 1890) (Philippines: Mindanao)
