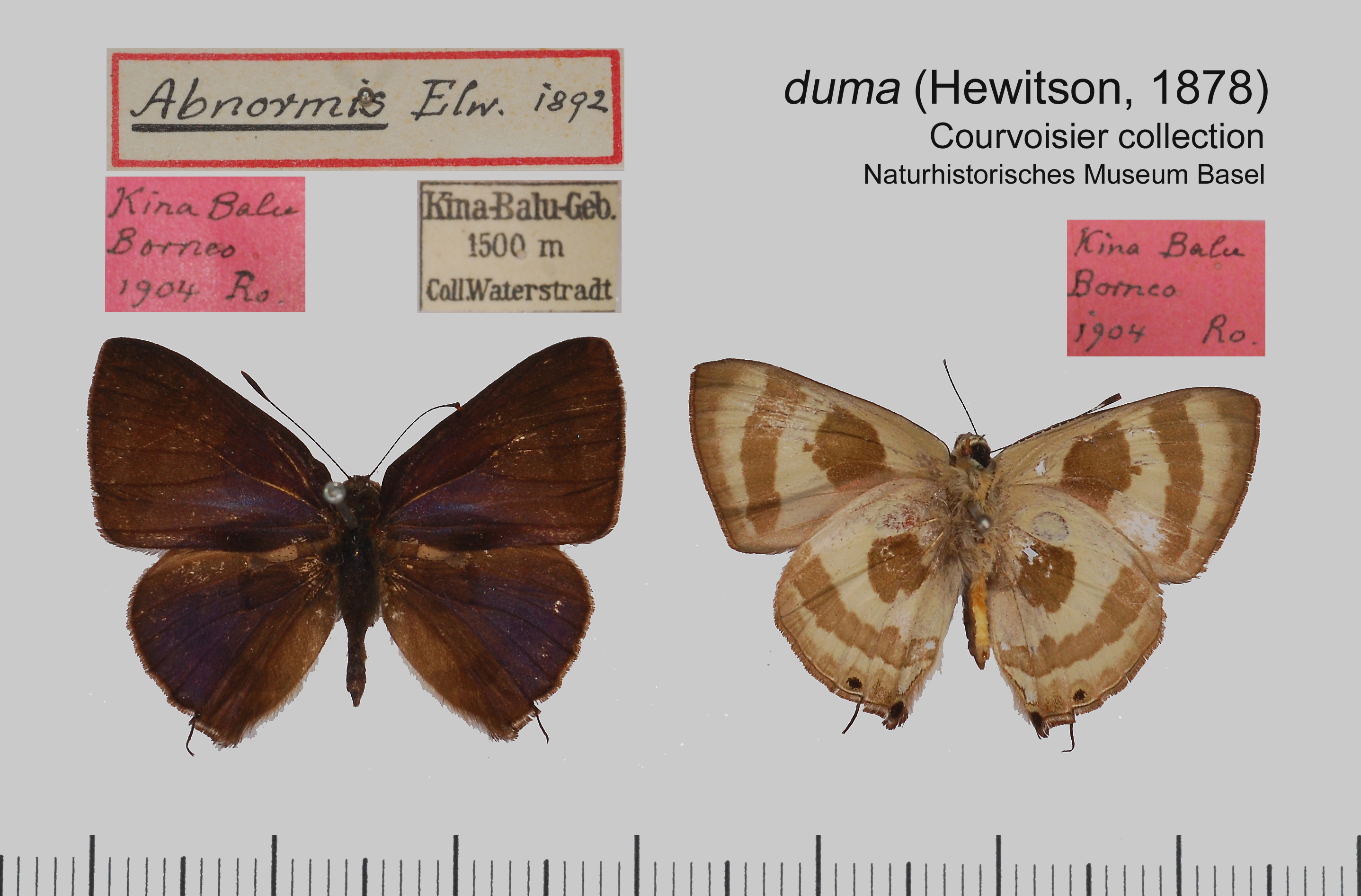
- Rapala duma Courvoisier Collection, Basel

Scientific classification
- Kingdom: Animalia
- Phylum: Arthropoda
- Class: Insecta
- Order: Lepidoptera
- Family: Lycaenidae
- Genus: Rapala
- Species: R. duma

Binomial name
- Rapala duma (Hewitson, 1878

Synonyms
- Thecla duma Hewitson, 1878; Rapala abnormis Elwes, [1893]; Rapala abnormis abusina Fruhstorfer, [1912]

= Rapala duma =

Species of butterfly

Rapala duma , or abnormal flash, is a butterfly in the family Lycaenidae. It was described by William Chapman Hewitson in 1878. It is found in the Indomalayan realm.

== Subspecies ==
- R. d. duma (Burma, Thailand, Peninsular Malaysia, Singapore, Borneo, Sumatra)
- R. d. abusina Fruhstorfer, 1912 (Java)
