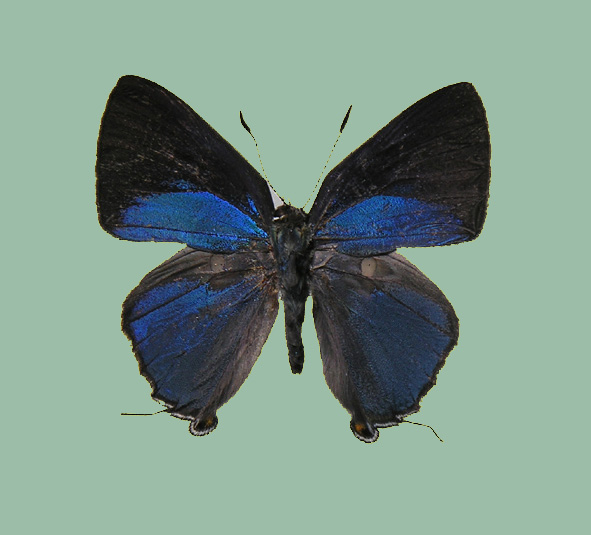
- Male upperside
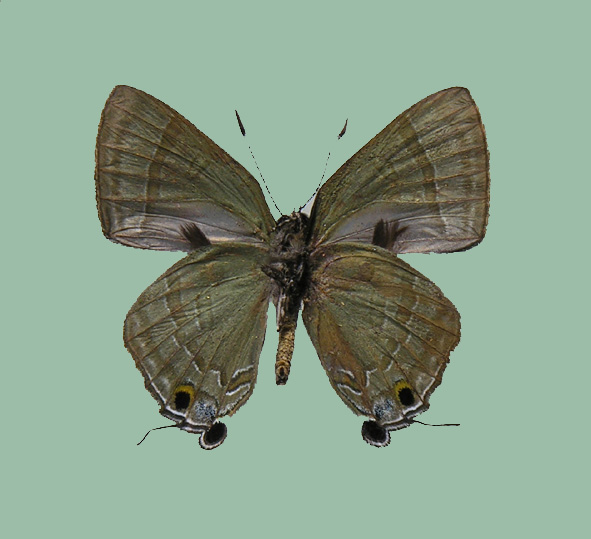
- Male underside

Scientific classification
- Kingdom: Animalia
- Phylum: Arthropoda
- Class: Insecta
- Order: Lepidoptera
- Family: Lycaenidae
- Genus: Rapala
- Species: R. tomokoae

Binomial name
- Rapala tomokoae H. Hayashi, Schroeder & Treadaway, 1978

= Rapala tomokoae =

Species of butterfly

Rapala tomokoae is a butterfly of the family Lycaenidae first described by Hisakazu Hayashi, Heinz G. Schroeder and Colin G. Treadaway in 1978. It is endemic to the Philippines. Its forewing length is 17–19 mm.

Etymology. The specific name is dedicated to Tomoko HAYASHI, the wife of the first author.

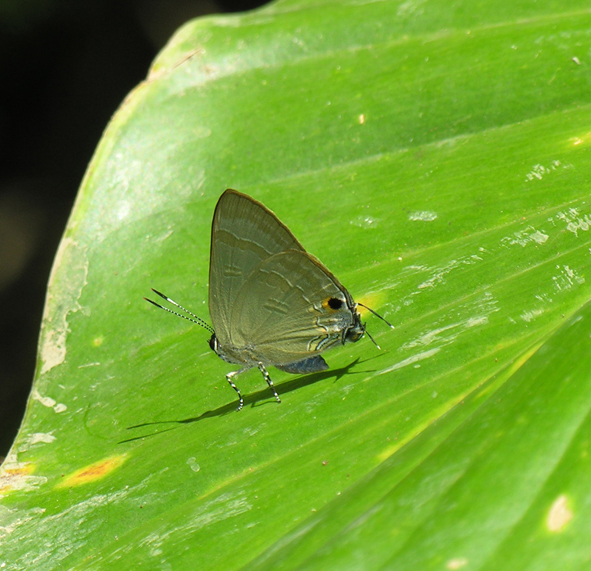
Female from Kanlaon Volcano on the island of Negros

== Subspecies ==
- Rapala tomokoae tomokoae H. Hayashi, Schroeder & Treadaway, [1978] Mindanao, Samar, Leyte, Dinagat and Tawi Tawi
- Rapala tomokoae takanamii H. Hayashi, [1984] Negros, Panay and Siquijor
- Rapala tomokoae bilara M. & T. Okano,[1990] Bohol
