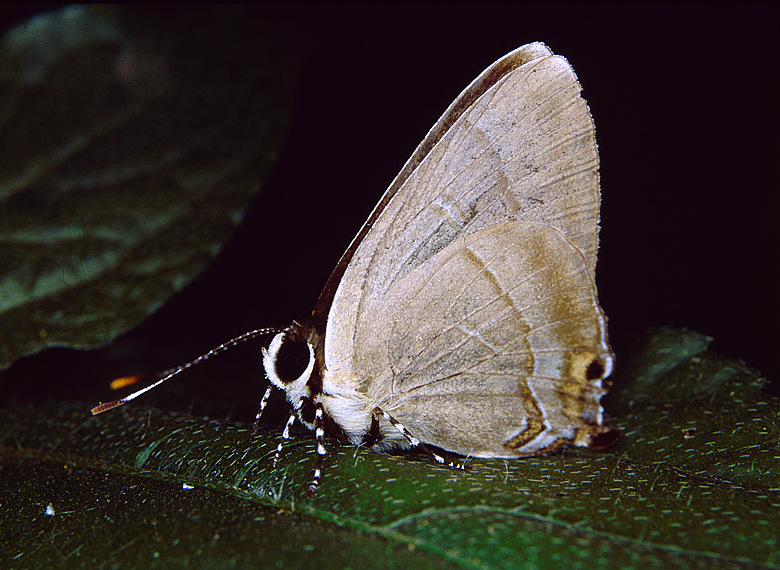
- Male in Sulawesi

Scientific classification
- Kingdom: Animalia
- Phylum: Arthropoda
- Class: Insecta
- Order: Lepidoptera
- Family: Lycaenidae
- Genus: Rapala
- Species: R. cassidyi

Binomial name
- Rapala cassidyi Takanami, 1992

= Rapala cassidyi =

Cassidy's flash

Species of butterfly

Rapala cassidyi, the Cassidy's flash is a lycaenid butterfly found in Sulawesi. It was discovered in 1985 during the Project Wallace expedition of the Royal Entomological Society. The female remains undescribed.

== Range ==
The species lives in northern Sulawesi, Indonesia, in Bogani Nani Wartabone National Park.

== Description ==
The upperside of the male is unusual in that it has only a small amount of pale orange on the discal area of the forewing below the cell; a pattern more reminiscent of females of the genus. The underside ground colour is light slate brown with a glossy sheen. The usual postdiscal striae or the genus are present in an ochreous colour and there is a diffuse ochreous marginal band on both wings.

== Gallery ==
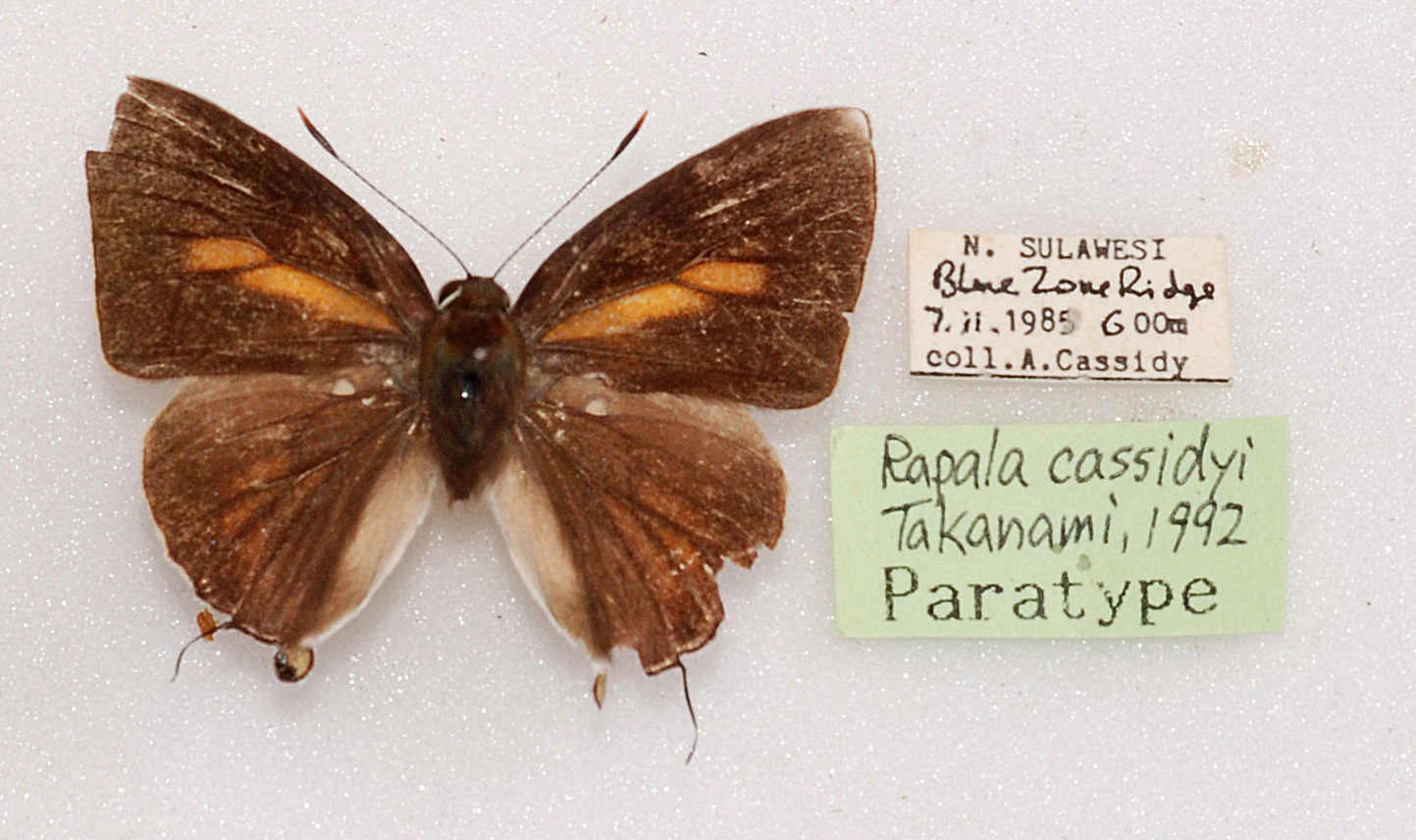
Upperside, paratype male, from northern Sulawesi

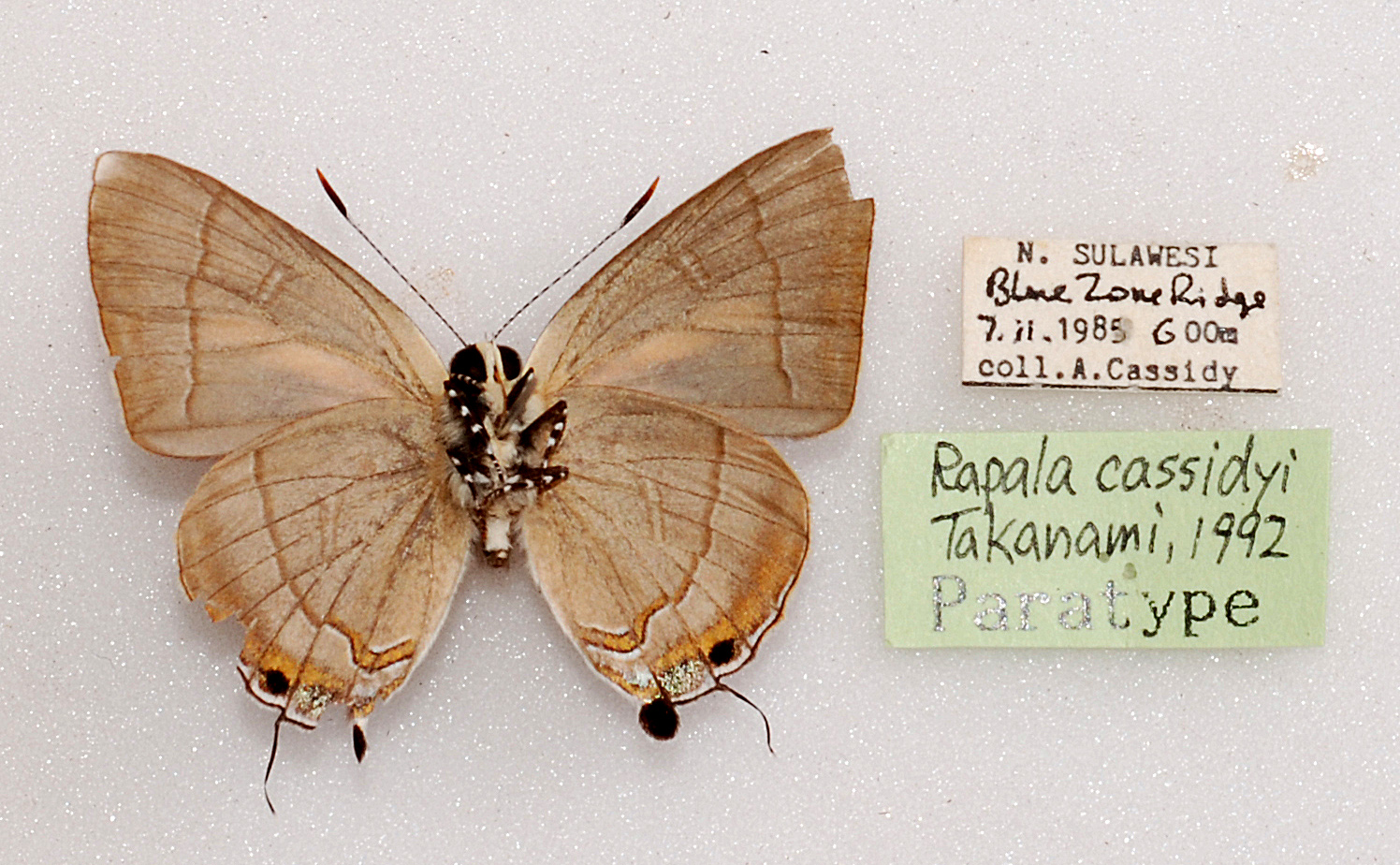
Underside, paratype male, from northern Sulawesi

== See also ==
- Theclinae
