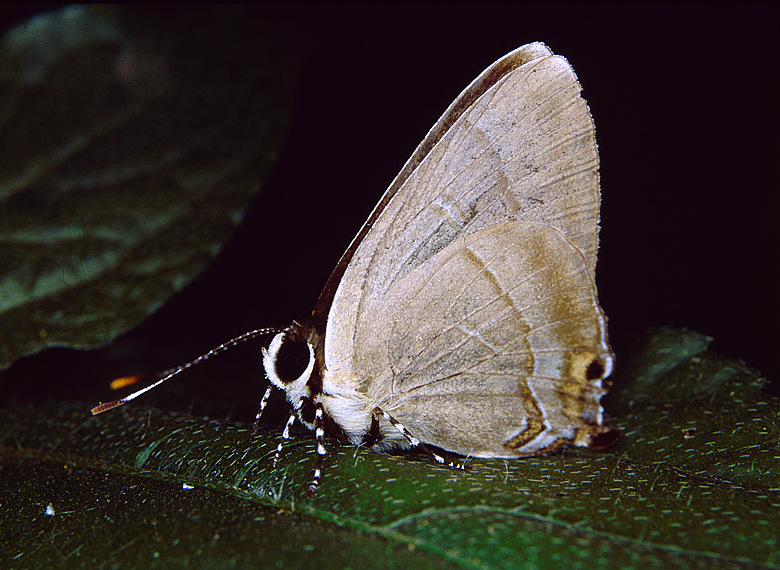
- Male Rapala cassidyi

Scientific classification
- Kingdom: Animalia
- Phylum: Arthropoda
- Clade: Pancrustacea
- Class: Insecta
- Order: Lepidoptera
- Family: Lycaenidae
- Tribe: Deudorigini
- Genus: Rapala; Moore, 1881

Synonyms
- Atara Zhdanko, 1996; Baspa Moore, 1882; Bidapsa Moore, 1882; Hysudra Moore, 1881; Nadisepa Moore, 1882

= Rapala (butterfly) =

Butterfly genus in family Lycaenidae

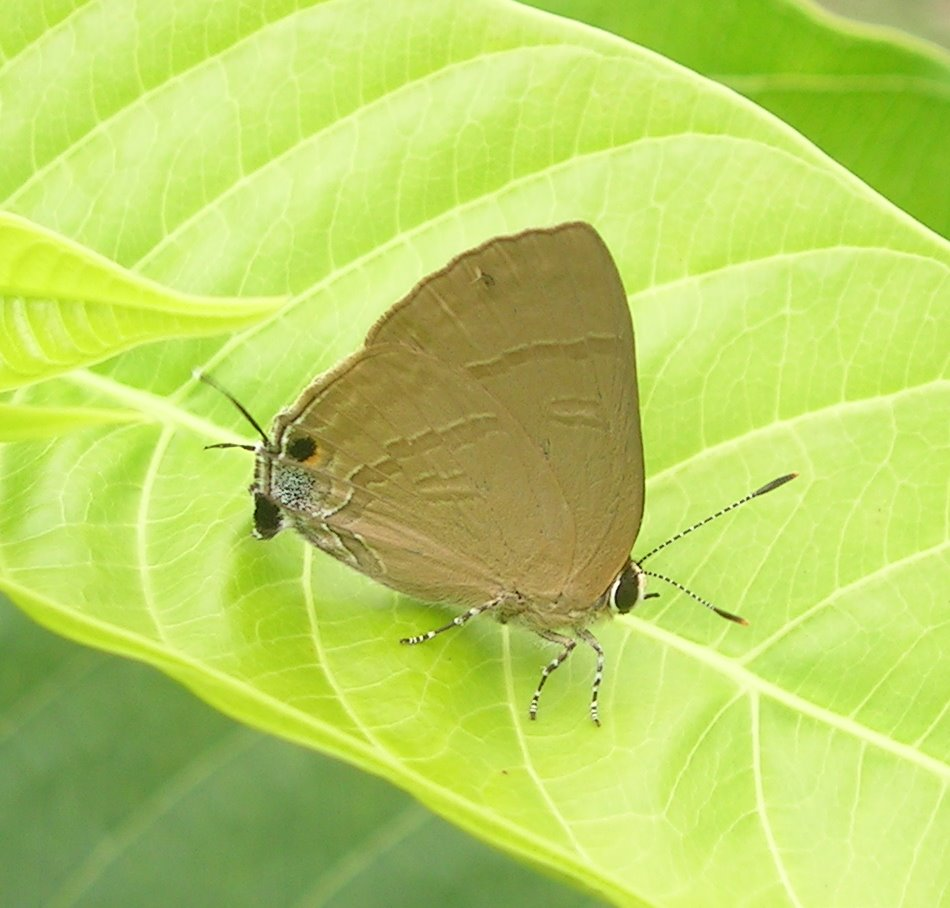
Rapala species from India

Rapala is a genus of butterflies in the tribe Deudorigini of the subfamily Theclinae of the family Lycaenidae. They are found throughout South Asia and Southeast Asia, with a few species extending to Australia and into the eastern Palaearctic region.

Males of Rapala are differentiated from other genera in the Deudorigini by their genitalia, with the conjoined valvae tapering evenly to rounded apices. The male secondary sexual characters also differ. In every species there is a brand above the origin of vein seven and lying wholly within space seven, clothed with very small scent scales, and nearly always there is an associated erectile hair tuft on the forewing dorsum beneath.

Almost all species exhibit sexual dimorphism in the colour of the upperside; normally the male is red, reddish brown or deep blue, while the female is dark brown or pale purple blue.

== Selected species ==
- Rapala arata (Bremer, 1861)
- Rapala cassidyi
- Rapala christopheri (Lane & Müller, 2006)
- Rapala dioetas
- Rapala diopites
- Rapala huangi
- Rapala iarbus
- Rapala lankana
- Rapala laximae
- Rapala melampus
- Rapala manea (Hewitson, [1863])
- Rapala melida
- Rapala nemorensis Oberthür, 1914
- Rapala nissa
- Rapala rectivitta
- Rapala repercussa Leech, 1890
- Ropala ribbei Johannes Röber, 1886
- Rapala rhoecus
- Rapala schistacea
- Rapala scintilla
- Rapala selira
- Rapala sphinx
- Rapala suffusa
- Rapala tomokoae H. Hayashi, Schrőder & Treadaway, [1978]
- Rapala varuna
