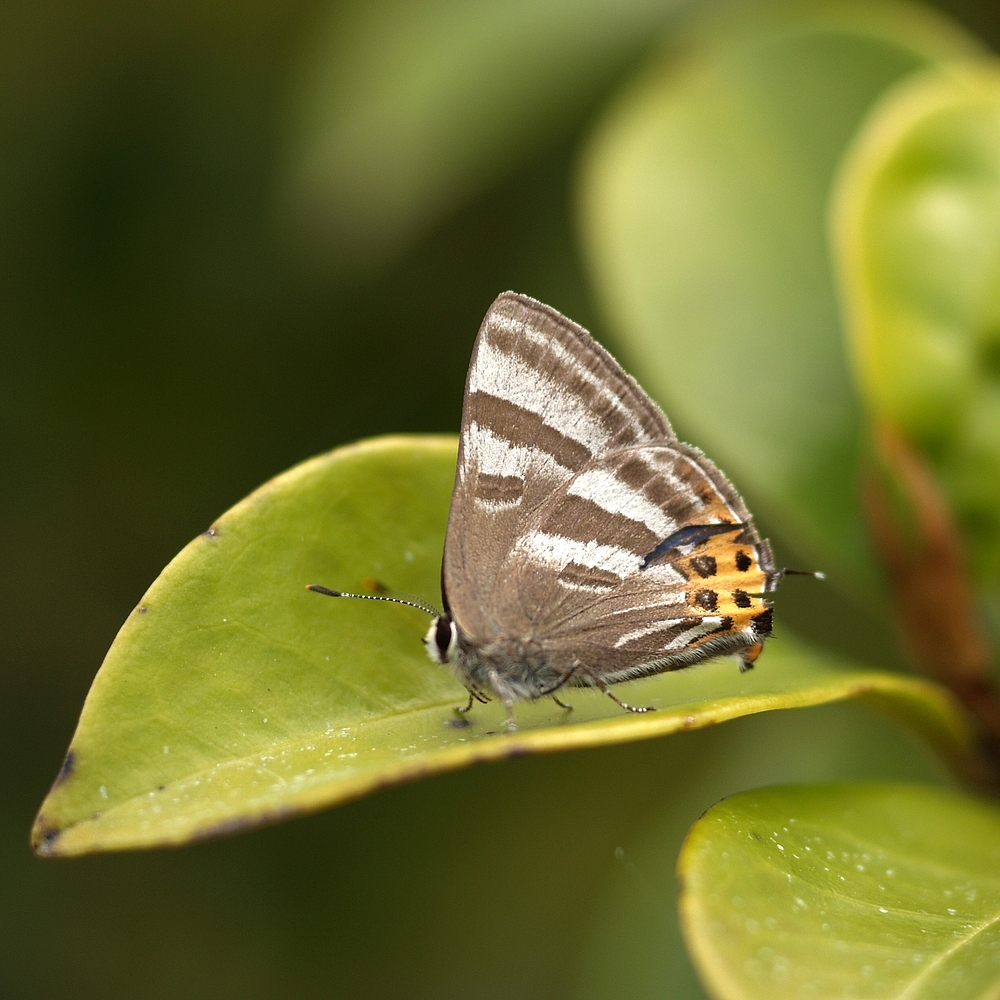

Scientific classification
- Kingdom: Animalia
- Phylum: Arthropoda
- Class: Insecta
- Order: Lepidoptera
- Family: Lycaenidae
- Genus: Rapala
- Species: R. arata

Binomial name
- Rapala arata (Bremer, 1861)

Synonyms
- Thecla arata Bremer, 1861; Deudorix arata; Thecla ichnographia Butler, 1866; Thecla tyrianthina Butler, 1881; Deudorix arata ab. luniger Seitz, [1909]; Rapala ogasawarae Matsumura, 1919; Deudorix juliae Kardakov, 1928; Rapala coreacola Matsumura, 1929; Rapala shakojiana Matsumura, 1929; Rapala suzukii Matsumura, 1929

= Rapala arata =

Species of butterfly

Rapala arata, the Japanese flash, is a butterfly of the family Lycaenidae. It is found from Russia (Amur, Ussuri, Sakhalin and the southern Kuriles), north-eastern China, Korea and Japan. The habitat consists of brook banks, meadows and the edges of montane mixed forests.

The length of the forewings is 14–17 mm. Adults are on wing from late May to late August in two generations in the southern part of the range. In the north, there is one generation with adults on wing in June.

The larvae feed on Fabaceae, Saxifragaceae, Ericaceae, Rhamnaceae and Fagaceae species.
