= Nick Grishin =

Russian-American biophysicist and lepidopterist

Nick V. Grishin (born c. 1970) is a Russian-American biophysicist, biochemist, and lepidopterist at the University of Texas Southwestern Medical Center in Dallas, Texas. He holds the Cecil H. and Ida M. Green Chair in Biomedical Science and is a Professor of Biochemistry and Biophysics. He served as a Howard Hughes Medical Institute (HHMI) Investigator from 2000 to 2021. He is known for his work on protein structure and evolution and separately, for applying whole-genome sequencing to the systematics and taxonomy of Lepidoptera.

== Early life and education ==
Grishin grew up in Russia, the son of college mathematics professors. He received a Diplom (the Russian equivalent of a master's degree) in biochemistry from Moscow State University, where he sequenced his first molecule — a bacterial enzyme — in 1991 using the then state-of-the-art Sanger sequencing method. He completed his Ph.D. in molecular biophysics at UT Southwestern Medical Center in 1998, working with Margaret Phillips, and carried out postdoctoral research with Eugene Koonin at the National Institutes of Health before joining the UT Southwestern faculty.

== Research ==
=== Protein structure and bioinformatics ===
Grishin's primary research field is the computational analysis of protein structure and evolution, with a focus on classifying protein domains and predicting their function from sequence. His lab developed tools for remote sequence similarity detection and multiple sequence alignment, and he has contributed to the Evolutionary Classification of Protein Domains (ECOD) database, a comprehensive resource for protein domain classification. His work has accumulated over 64,000 citations. He has also contributed to medical research, including work on PCSK9, a genetic variant associated with reduced cholesterol in humans that became the basis for important cholesterol-lowering drugs.

=== Butterfly genomics and taxonomy ===
In parallel with his bioinformatics work, Grishin has pursued lepidopterology as both a scientific discipline and a personal passion, using the same computational tools developed for protein analysis to study butterfly genomes at scale. His laboratory sequenced all 845 butterfly species recorded from North America north of Mexico, producing one of the most comprehensive genomic datasets for any large group of animals on a continental scale. This project, carried out with collaborators including Paul Opler and members of his lab, has yielded substantial revisions to Lepidoptera taxonomy and species boundaries.

His group has also pioneered the genomic sequencing of museum type specimens — some over 140 years old — to resolve long-standing taxonomic questions where morphology alone is insufficient. In one study, DNA was non-destructively extracted from a single foreleg of a 19th-century Malagasy skipper butterfly, yielding a complete mitogenome that supported placement of the genus Malaza in a new subfamily.

He has described numerous new butterfly species and higher taxa, with collaborators including Jing Zhang, Qian Cong, and Jinhui Shen of his own laboratory, as well as field naturalists and museum curators worldwide.
