= Qinorapala =

Scientific classification
- Kingdom: Animalia
- Phylum: Arthropoda
- Class: Insecta
- Order: Lepidoptera
- Family: Lycaenidae
- Tribe: Deudorigini
- Genus: Qinorapala

Butterfly genus in family Lycaenidae

Qinorapala is a genus of butterflies in the family Lycaenidae. The single species Qinorapala qinlingana Chou & Wang, 1995 is endemic to the Qinling mountain range. Until 2024, only the male of the species had been described from Shaanxi and Gansu Provinces. The female was identified in Shaanxi and western Sichuan Province.
