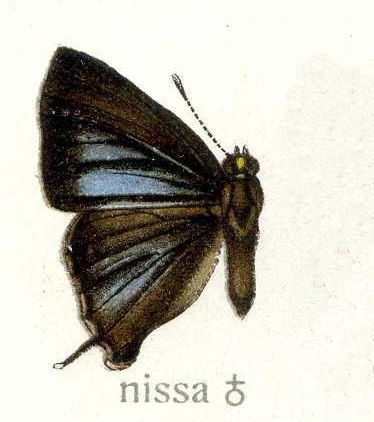
- Bidaspa nissa Male, upperside.

Scientific classification
- Kingdom: Animalia
- Phylum: Arthropoda
- Class: Insecta
- Order: Lepidoptera
- Family: Lycaenidae
- Genus: Rapala
- Species: R. nissa

Binomial name
- Rapala nissa (Kollar, 1848)

= Rapala nissa =

Common flash

Species of butterfly

Rapala nissa, commonly known as the common flash is a species of lycaenid or blue butterfly found in India. It was previously assigned to the genus Bidaspa.

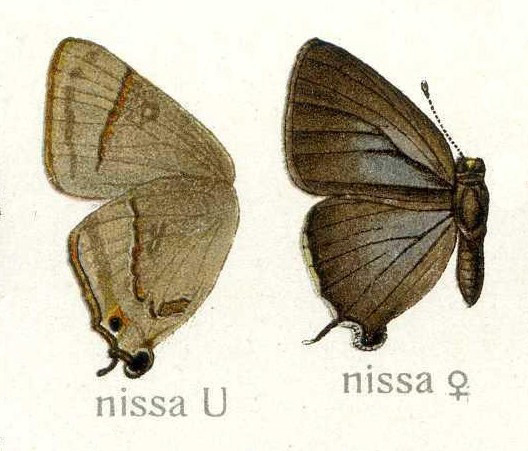
Bidaspa nissa Underside on right, female on left
