= List of lycaenid genera: B =

The large butterfly family Lycaenidae contains the following genera starting with the letter B:

- Balintus
- Baliochila
- Baspa
- Batelusia
- Bergmania
- Bindahara
- Bistonina
- Bothrinia
- Brangas
- Brephidium
- Brevianta
- Britomartis
- Bullis
- Busbiina
- Bussa
