= Heterogynis canalensis =

Scientific classification
- Domain: Eukaryota
- Kingdom: Animalia
- Phylum: Arthropoda
- Class: Insecta
- Order: Lepidoptera
- Family: Heterogynidae
- Genus: Heterogynis
- Species: H. canalensis

Binomial name
- Heterogynis canalensis Chapman, 1904

Species of moth

Heterogynis canalensis is a moth in the Heterogynidae family. It was described by Thomas Algernon Chapman in 1904. The Global Lepidoptera Names Index reports it as a synonym of Heterogynis penella.
