= Bussa =

Bussa may refer to:

- Bussa's rebellion, the largest slave revolt in Barbadian history, led by African-born slave Bussa
- Bussa Emancipation Statue, a public sculpture symbolising the "breaking of the chains" of slavery in Barbados (referred to as Bussa by locals)
- Bussa (butterfly), a genus of butterfly
- Bussa, Nigeria, a former town in Nigeria
  - New Bussa, the Nigerian town that replaced Bussa after its destruction
  - Bussa rebellion, insurrection against the British Empire in 1915
- Bussa language, a language spoken in Ethiopia
- Bussa (surname), a surname (including a list of people with the name)

== See also ==
- Busa (disambiguation)
