= Baspa =

Baspa may refer to:

- Baspa River, a river in the Himalayas
  - Baspa Valley, the valley of the Baspa River (also known as the Sangla Valley, after the name of the major town of Sangla located in the valley)
- Baspa, a former gossamer-winged butterfly genus (Moore, 1882), now included in the Rapala butterfly genus
- Baspa (butterfly), a genus of butterflies in the family Lycaenidae found in South-East Asia
  - Baspa melampus, the type species of Baspa
