= Bussa (surname) =

Bussa is a surname. Notable people with the name include:

- Gael Bussa (born 1993), Congolese lawyer and politician
- Nansel Bussa (born 2003), Nigerian footballer
- Rubellia Bassa (born between 33-38AD), Roman and daughter of Gaius Rubellius Blandus

== See also ==
- Busa (surname)
- Busse
- Bussa (disambiguation)
