= Janseola fulvithorax =

Scientific classification
- Kingdom: Animalia
- Phylum: Arthropoda
- Class: Insecta
- Order: Lepidoptera
- Family: Zygaenidae
- Genus: Janseola
- Species: J. fulvithorax

Binomial name
- Janseola fulvithorax Hampson

Species of moth

Janseola fulvithorax is a moth in the family Heterogynidae. It was described by George Hampson.
