= Busa (surname) =

Busa is a surname. Notable people with the name include:

- Bianka Busa (born 1994), Serbian female volleyball player
- Roberto Busa (1913–2011), Italian Jesuit priest and pioneer of digital humanities
- Lance Busa (born 1994), Filipino singer and occasional actor
- Luigi Busà (born 1987), Italian karateka
- István Busa (born 1961), Hungarian fencer
- Julius Busa (1891–1917), Austro-Hungarian World War I flying ace
- Vasu Busa (born 2003), Full-stack Developer

== See also ==
- Bussa (surname)
- Busa (disambiguation)
