= Heterogynis andalusica =

Scientific classification
- Domain: Eukaryota
- Kingdom: Animalia
- Phylum: Arthropoda
- Class: Insecta
- Order: Lepidoptera
- Family: Heterogynidae
- Genus: Heterogynis
- Species: H. andalusica

Binomial name
- Heterogynis andalusica Daniel, 1966

Species of moth

Heterogynis andalusica is a moth in the Heterogynidae family. It was described by Franz Daniel in 1966.
