= Heterogynis rifensis =

Scientific classification
- Domain: Eukaryota
- Kingdom: Animalia
- Phylum: Arthropoda
- Class: Insecta
- Order: Lepidoptera
- Family: Heterogynidae
- Genus: Heterogynis
- Species: H. rifensis

Binomial name
- Heterogynis rifensis de Freina, 2003

Species of moth

Heterogynis rifensis is a moth in the Heterogynidae family. It was described by Josef J. de Freina in 2003.
