= Heterogynis eremita =

Scientific classification
- Domain: Eukaryota
- Kingdom: Animalia
- Phylum: Arthropoda
- Class: Insecta
- Order: Lepidoptera
- Family: Heterogynidae
- Genus: Heterogynis
- Species: H. eremita

Binomial name
- Heterogynis eremita Zilli, Cianchi, Racheli & Bullini, 1988

Species of moth

Heterogynis eremita is a moth in the Heterogynidae family. It was described by Alberto Zilli, R. Cianchi, T. Racheli and L. Bullini in 1988.
