= Janseola titaea =

Scientific classification
- Domain: Eukaryota
- Kingdom: Animalia
- Phylum: Arthropoda
- Class: Insecta
- Order: Lepidoptera
- Family: Zygaenidae
- Genus: Janseola
- Species: J. titaea

Binomial name
- Janseola titaea H. Druce, 1896

Species of moth

Janseola titaea is a moth in the family Heterogynidae. It was described by Herbert Druce in 1896.
