= Heterogynis paradoxa =

Scientific classification
- Kingdom: Animalia
- Phylum: Arthropoda
- Class: Insecta
- Order: Lepidoptera
- Family: Heterogynidae
- Genus: Heterogynis
- Species: H. paradoxa

Binomial name
- Heterogynis paradoxa Rambur, 1837

Species of moth

Heterogynis paradoxa is a moth in the Heterogynidae family. It was described by Jules Pierre Rambur in 1837.
