= Janseola eremita =

Scientific classification
- Kingdom: Animalia
- Phylum: Arthropoda
- Class: Insecta
- Order: Lepidoptera
- Family: Zygaenidae
- Genus: Janseola
- Species: J. eremita

Binomial name
- Janseola eremita Zilli, Cianchi, Racheli & Bullini, 1988

Species of moth

Janseola eremita is a moth in the family Heterogynidae. It was described by Alberto Zilli and colleagues in 1988.
