= Heterogynis thomas =

Scientific classification
- Domain: Eukaryota
- Kingdom: Animalia
- Phylum: Arthropoda
- Class: Insecta
- Order: Lepidoptera
- Family: Heterogynidae
- Genus: Heterogynis
- Species: H. thomas

Binomial name
- Heterogynis thomas Zilli, 1987

Species of moth

Heterogynis thomas is a moth in the Heterogynidae family. It was described by Alberto Zilli in 1987.
