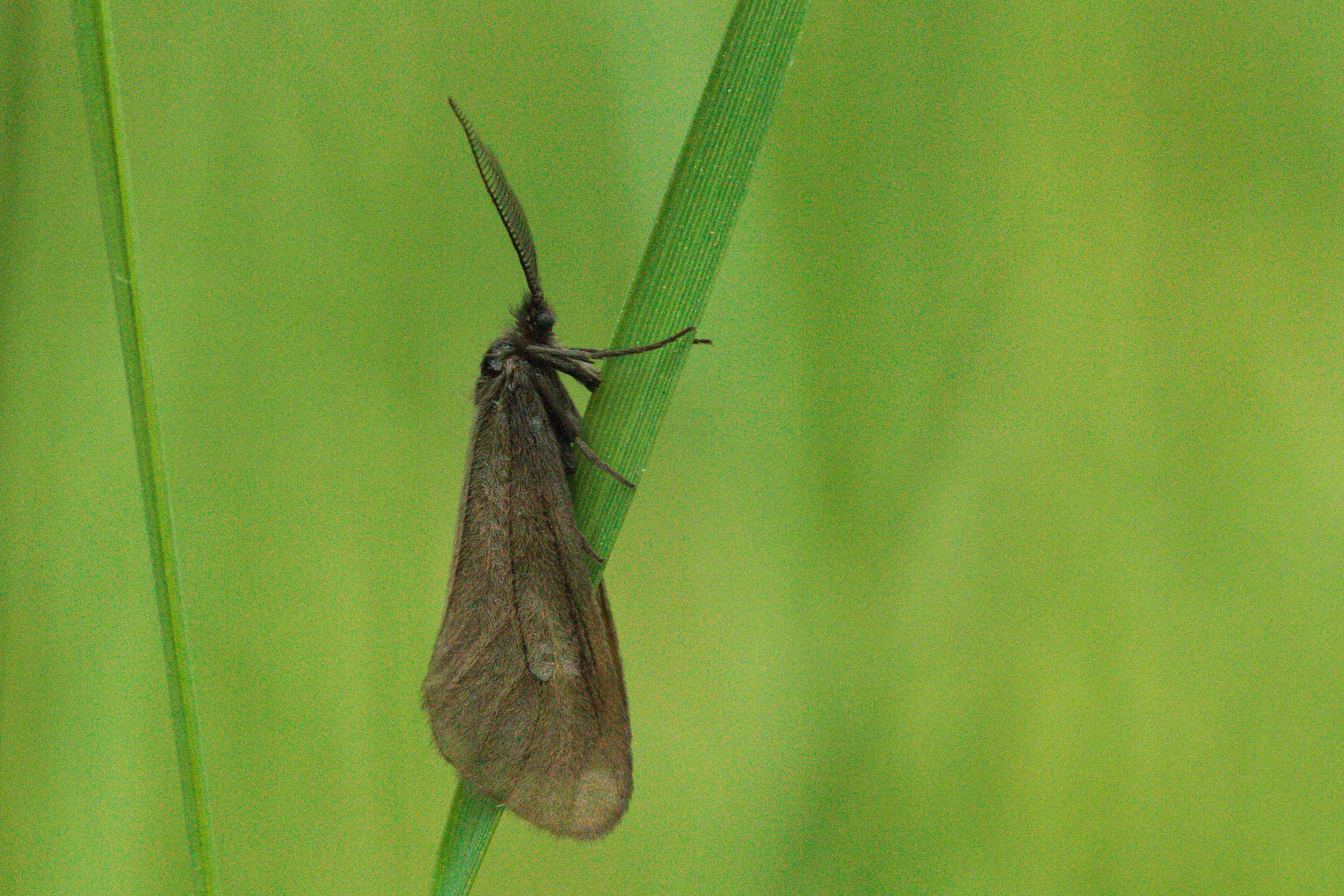
- Heterogynis paradoxa

Scientific classification
- Kingdom: Animalia
- Phylum: Arthropoda
- Class: Insecta
- Order: Lepidoptera
- Family: Heterogynidae
- Genus: Heterogynis; Rambur, 1837

= Heterogynis =

Genus of moths

Heterogynis is a genus of moths of the Heterogynidae family.

== Species ==
- Heterogynis penella (Hübner, 1819)
- Heterogynis canalensis Chapman, 1904
- Heterogynis paradoxa Rambur, 1837
- Heterogynis eremita Zilli, Cianchi, Racheli & Bullini, 1988
- Heterogynis andalusica Daniel, 1966
- Heterogynis thomas Zilli, 1987
- Heterogynis jellaba de Freina, 2003
- Heterogynis rifensis de Freina, 2003
