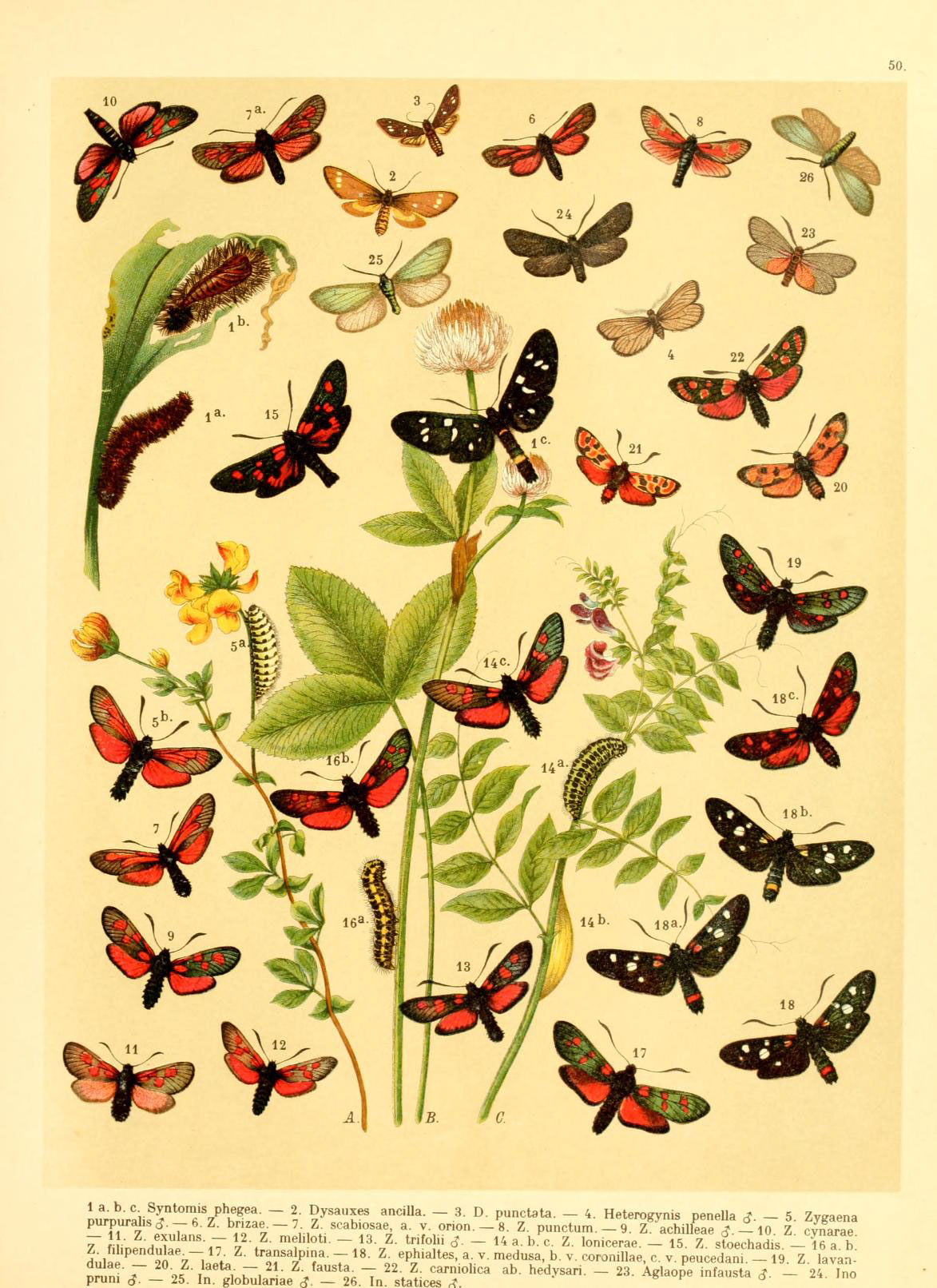

Scientific classification
- Kingdom: Animalia
- Phylum: Arthropoda
- Clade: Pancrustacea
- Class: Insecta
- Order: Lepidoptera
- Family: Heterogynidae
- Genus: Heterogynis
- Species: H. penella

Binomial name
- Heterogynis penella (Hübner, 1819)

Synonyms
- Tinea penella Hubner, 1819; Heterogynis affinis Rambur, 1837; Heterogynis hispana Rambur, 1839

= Heterogynis penella =

Species of moth

Heterogynis penella is a moth in the Heterogynidae family. It is found in the Mediterranean region and the southern Alps. In central Europe, it is known from the Alsace.

The wingspan is 24–27 mm. Adults are on wing in June in one generation per year.

The larvae are known to feed on Genista pilosa, but have also been reared on Lotus corniculatus.
