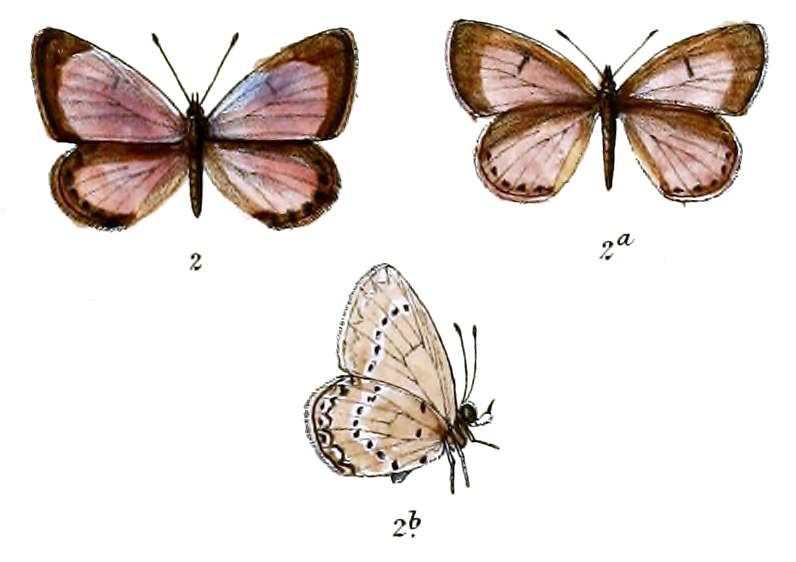

Scientific classification
- Domain: Eukaryota
- Kingdom: Animalia
- Phylum: Arthropoda
- Class: Insecta
- Order: Lepidoptera
- Family: Lycaenidae
- Genus: Bothrinia
- Species: B. chennellii

Binomial name
- Bothrinia chennellii (De Nicéville, 1884)

= Bothrinia chennellii =

Hedge Cupid

Species of butterfly

Bothrinia chennellii, the hedge Cupid, is a small butterfly found in India that belongs to the lycaenids or blues family.

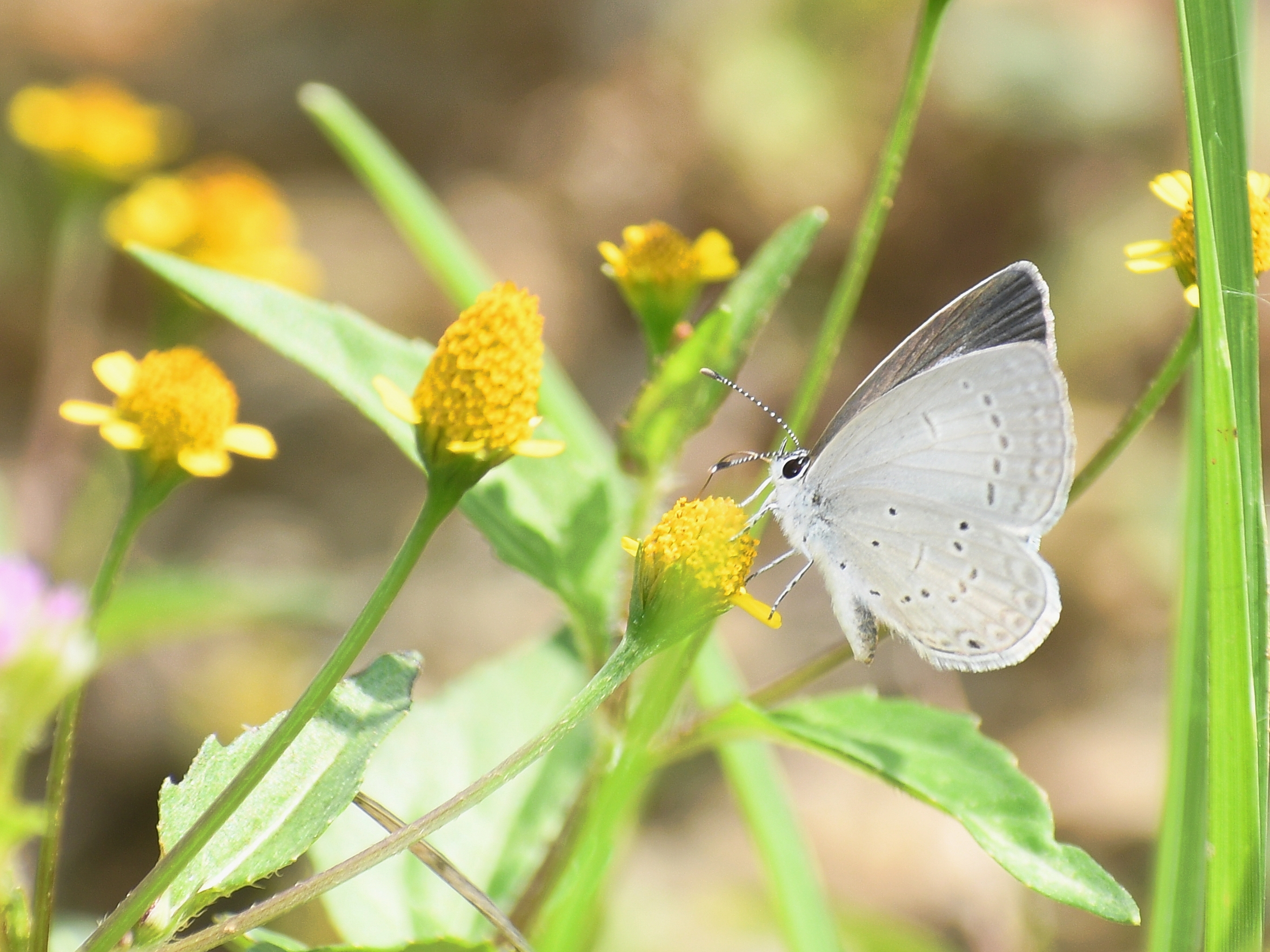

== Description ==
Male upperside: lavender blue, varying a little in depth of tint. Forewing: a very slender line along the costa and an even border to the termen from apex to tornus dusky black. Hindwing: costal and terminal margins with even dusky black borders, slightly broader on the costa than on the termen; on the latter the black border encloses a very indistinct series of round spots of the ground colour, each spot centred with black, which are more prominent posteriorly than anteriorly. Underside: bluish white, in some specimens slightly yellowish white; the markings small, delicate and very regular; the postdiscal transverse series of abbreviated lines on the forewing bisinuate and nearly as in C. lanka, but the series further from the termen and the short lines that compose it not quite end to end but a little en echelon one to the other; the terminal markings on both forewings and hindwings more or less obsolescent apparently at all seasons.

Female upperside: ground colour similar to that in the male. Forewing: costa, apex and termen very broadly dusky brownish black; over the blue area the dark veins are somewhat prominent, on the termen the black border occupies in some specimens more than one-third of the wing and in all is very even. Hindwing: the dark veins as conspicuous as on the forewing; anterior third of wing dusky black, termen with a well-marked anteciliary line and a more or less distinct and complete subterminal series of spots. Underside: as in the male. Antennae, head, thorax and abdomen in both sexes dusky black, the antennae ringed with white; beneath: palpi, thorax and abdomen white.

== Distribution ==
Recorded only from Shillong in Meghalaya and the northern Chin Hills in Upper Burma.

== See also ==
- List of butterflies of India
- List of butterflies of India (Lycaenidae)
