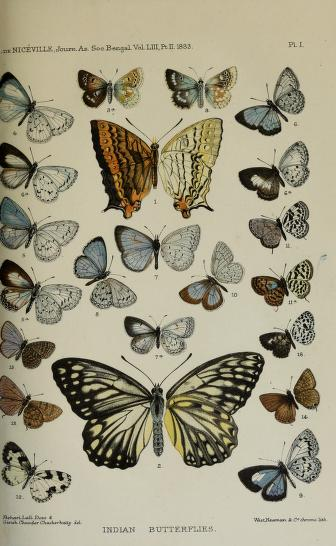
- Bothrinia chennellii figure 10 which accompanied the original description

Scientific classification
- Domain: Eukaryota
- Kingdom: Animalia
- Phylum: Arthropoda
- Class: Insecta
- Order: Lepidoptera
- Family: Lycaenidae
- Subfamily: Polyommatinae
- Tribe: Polyommatini
- Genus: Bothrinia; Chapman, 1909

= Bothrinia =

Butterfly genus in family Lycaenidae

Bothrinia is a genus of butterflies in the family Lycaenidae. Known from southern China, India (Assam) and northern Thailand.

There are two species.

- Bothrinia chennellii (de Nicéville, 1884)
- Bothrinia nebulosa (Leech, 1890) China
