= Janseola =

Scientific classification
- Domain: Eukaryota
- Kingdom: Animalia
- Phylum: Arthropoda
- Class: Insecta
- Order: Lepidoptera
- Family: Zygaenidae
- Subfamily: Procridinae
- Genus: Janseola; Hopp, 1923

Genus of moths

Janseola is a genus of moths in the family Heterogynidae. It was described by Walter Hopp in 1923

== Species ==
- Janseola fulvithorax Hampson
- Janseola titaea Druce, 1896
- Janseola thoinds Zilli, Cianchi, Racheli & Bullini, 1988
- Janseola eremita Zilli, Cianchi, Racheli & Bullini, 1988
