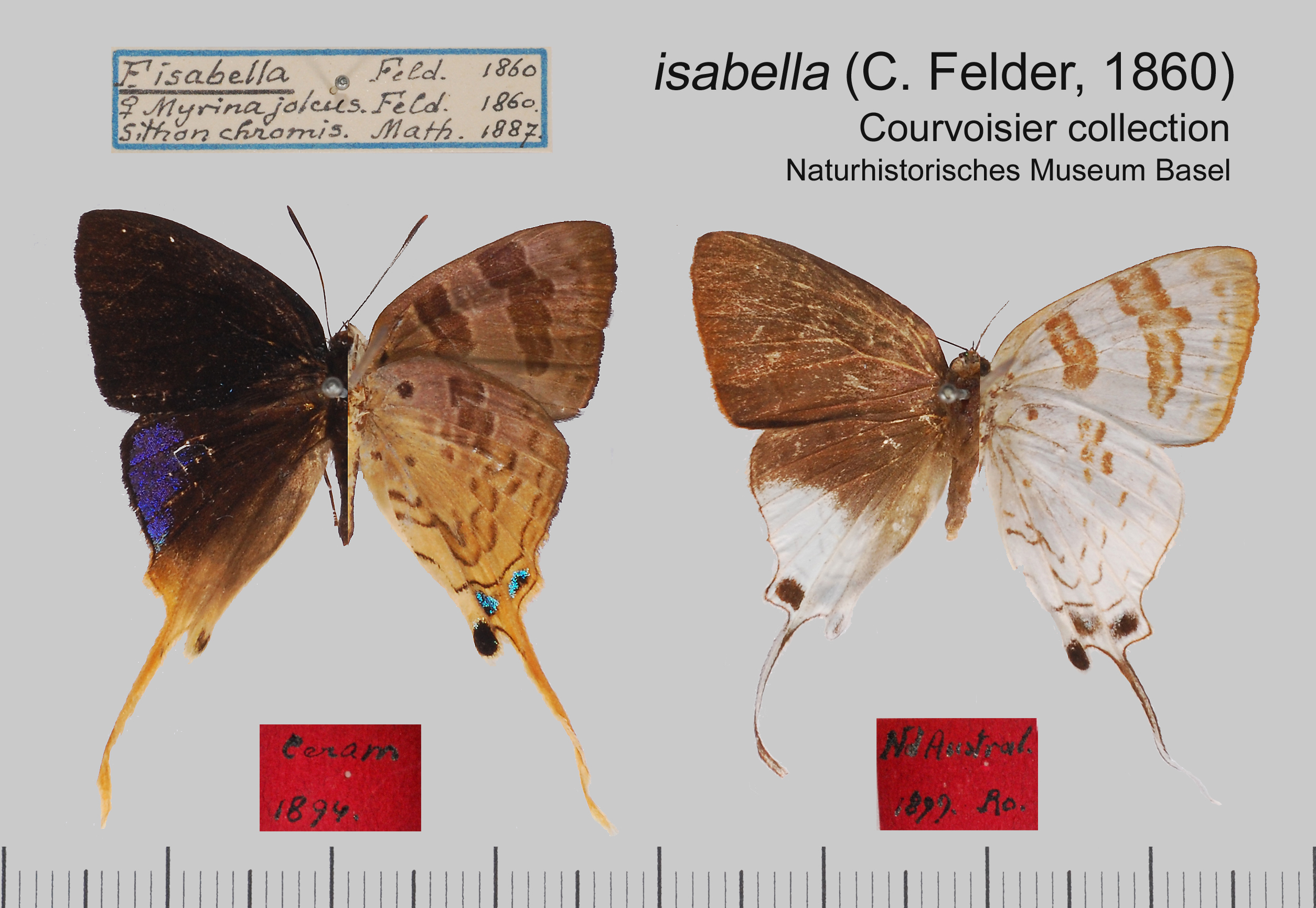
- Bindahara phocides isabella Indonesia
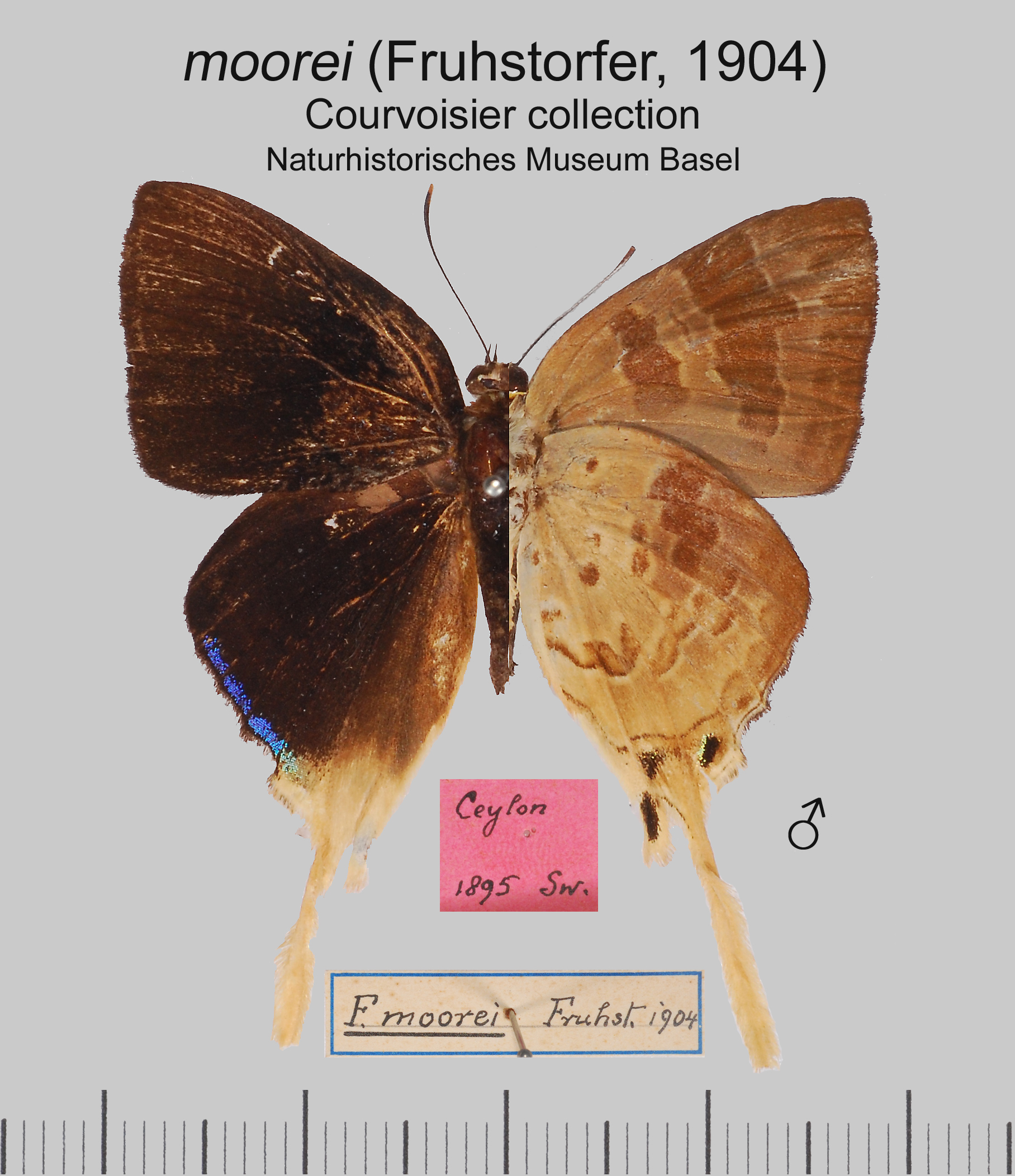
- Bindahara phocides moorei Ceylon Courvoisier Collection, Basel

Scientific classification
- Kingdom: Animalia
- Phylum: Arthropoda
- Class: Insecta
- Order: Lepidoptera
- Family: Lycaenidae
- Genus: Bindahara
- Species: B. phocides

Binomial name
- Bindahara phocides (Fabricius 1793)

= Bindahara phocides =

Plane

Species of butterfly

Bindahara phocides, the plane, is a small butterfly found Indomalayan (including Sri Lanka, India) and Australasian realms that belongs to the lycaenids or blues family.

== Description ==
Male. Upperside dark fuliginous-brown. Forewing without markings. lllndwing with the tail, anal lobe, and a small anal patch dull ochreous; a small indistinct spot on the anal lobe. Underside pale ochreous-brown. Forewing, a black spot at the base of the cell, a dark brown, broad, outwardly curved band with irregular ochreous edges, from the costal nervure to a little below the median vein, crossing the cell somewhat beyond its middle, with pale indications of its continuation hindwards, a pale brown line, edged on both sides with ochreous at the end of the cell; a dark brown, broad discal band, from the costa to a little below the sub-median vein, composed of conjoined squarish spots, the first four outwardly oblique, the others commencing a little inwards nearly straight down the wing, narrowing gradually hindwards; indications of a pale brown, sub-marginal, double series of lunular marks. Hindwing with a basal blackish-brown spot, a larger one immediately below the costal vein, two smaller ones in a line below it, two conjoined spots closing the cell, a discal very irregular band, commencing from the costal vein where there is a large square blackish-brown spot attached to it below, half outwards is a similar spot, with a smaller blackish-brown spot attached to its lower side half outwards; these are followed by a curiously formed series of five small paler spots, the first well outside, a parallel pair below it and another similar pair below and inwards; then there is an indistinct pair below these joined on the inner side to a heart-shaped pale spot with brown edges, with a curving sinuous brown line attached, which bends inwards and upwards near the abdominal margin at its middle and runs up it to the base in a series of indistinct spots, all edged with ochreous; a sub-terminal series of lunules enclosing two blackish spots with scattered metallic greenish scales and a prominent black spot on the anal lobe, all of which vary much in different examples, and are sometimes obscure. Antennse black, paler on the underside, with white dots; head and body above and below concolorous with the wings. Female. Upperside brown, with a bronzy gloss in certain lights, a pure white patch divided by the brown veins, on the lower end of the hindwing, margined outwardly with a blackish anteciliary line, containing a large black round spot at the base of the tail on the outer side and another smaller and less distinct spot on the inner side, a black spot on the anal lobe. Underside white, bauds and spots paler than in the male, but similarly disposed.

— Charles Swinhoe, Lepidoptera Indica. Vol. IX

== Subspecies ==
The subspecies are:

- B. p. phocides Sikkim - Myanmar, Andaman, South Yunnan
- B. p. areca Nicobar
- B. p. fumata (Röber, 1887) Sulawesi, Talaud, Banggai, Sula
- B. p. moorei Fruhstorfer, 1904 Sri Lanka, south India

"Male and female, similar to the nominate subspecies above and below in both sexes, except that on the upperside of the hindwing there is a narrow, terminal blue-green band from near the apex to vein 2." Recently elevated to species but uncertain, see discussion on inaturalist

- B. p. phocas Staudinger, 1889 Palawan
- B. p. chromis (Mathew, 1887) Bismarck Archipelago, Solomons
- B. p. isabella (Felder, 1860) Cape York - Townsville
- B. p. origenes Fruhstorfer, 1912 Philippines (Mindanao)

== Biology ==
The larva feeds on Salacia.

== Gallery ==
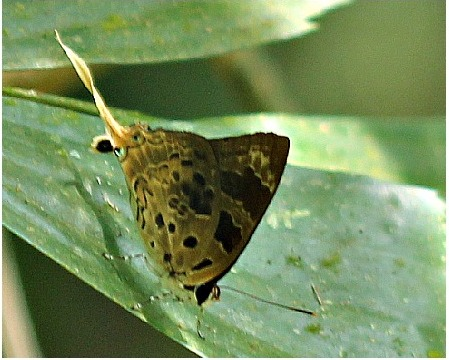
At Mount Harriet National Park in the Andamans

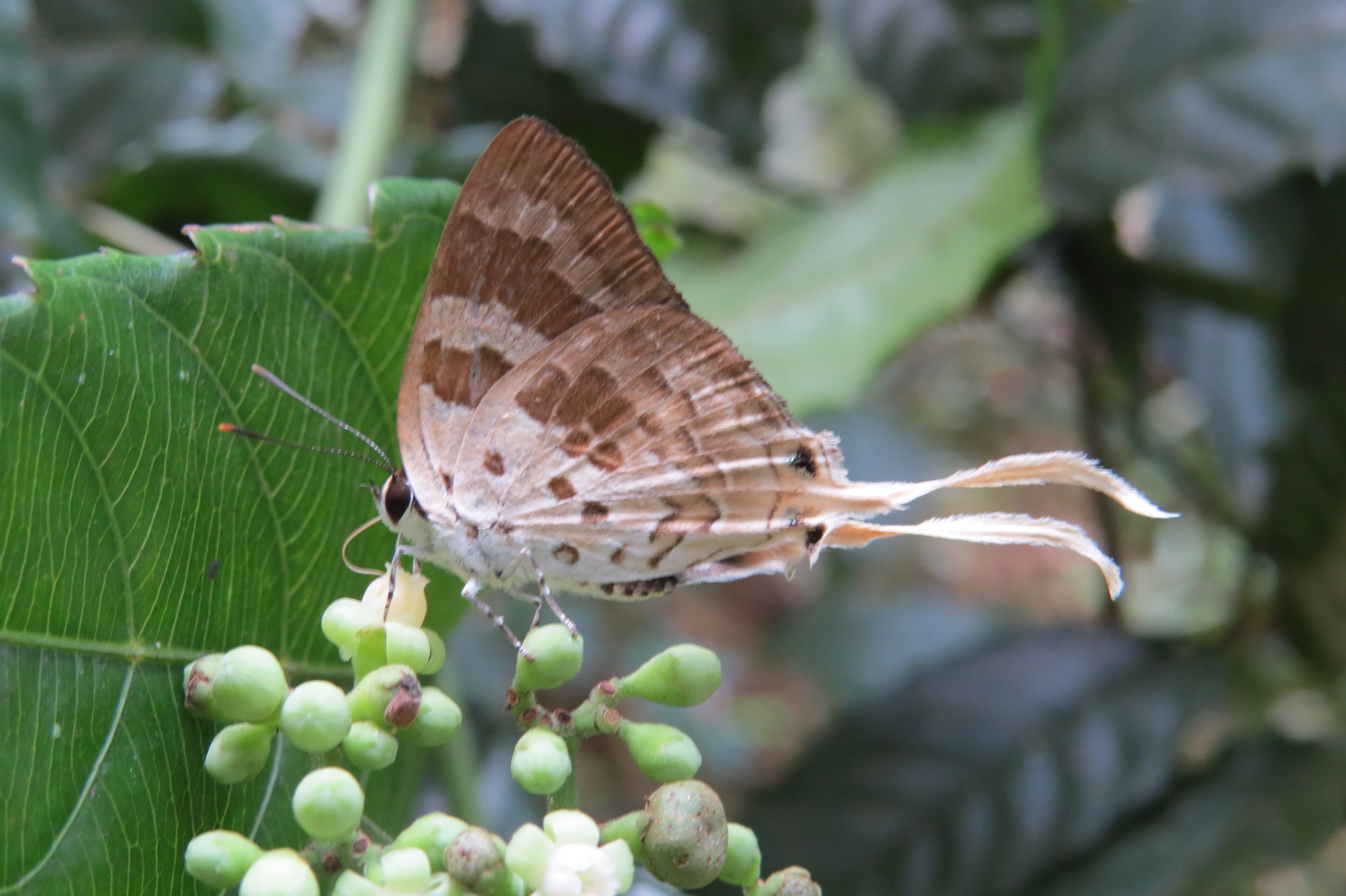
B. p. moorei

== See also ==
- List of butterflies of India (Lycaenidae)
