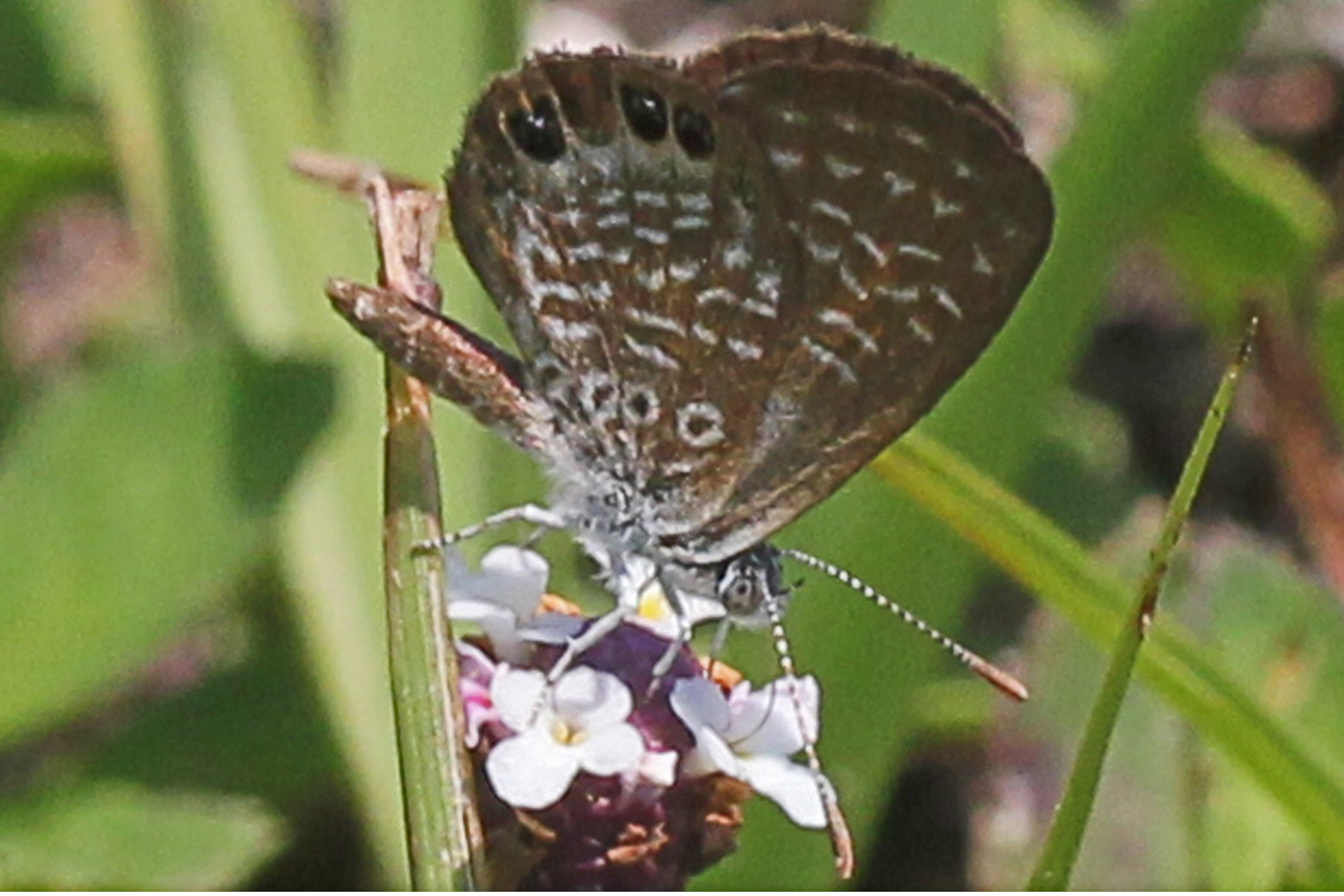

Conservation status
- Secure (NatureServe)

Scientific classification
- Domain: Eukaryota
- Kingdom: Animalia
- Phylum: Arthropoda
- Class: Insecta
- Order: Lepidoptera
- Family: Lycaenidae
- Genus: Brephidium
- Species: B. pseudofea

Binomial name
- Brephidium pseudofea (Morrison, 1873)

Synonyms
- Brephidium isophthalma Herrich-Schäffer, 1862

= Brephidium pseudofea =

Species of butterfly

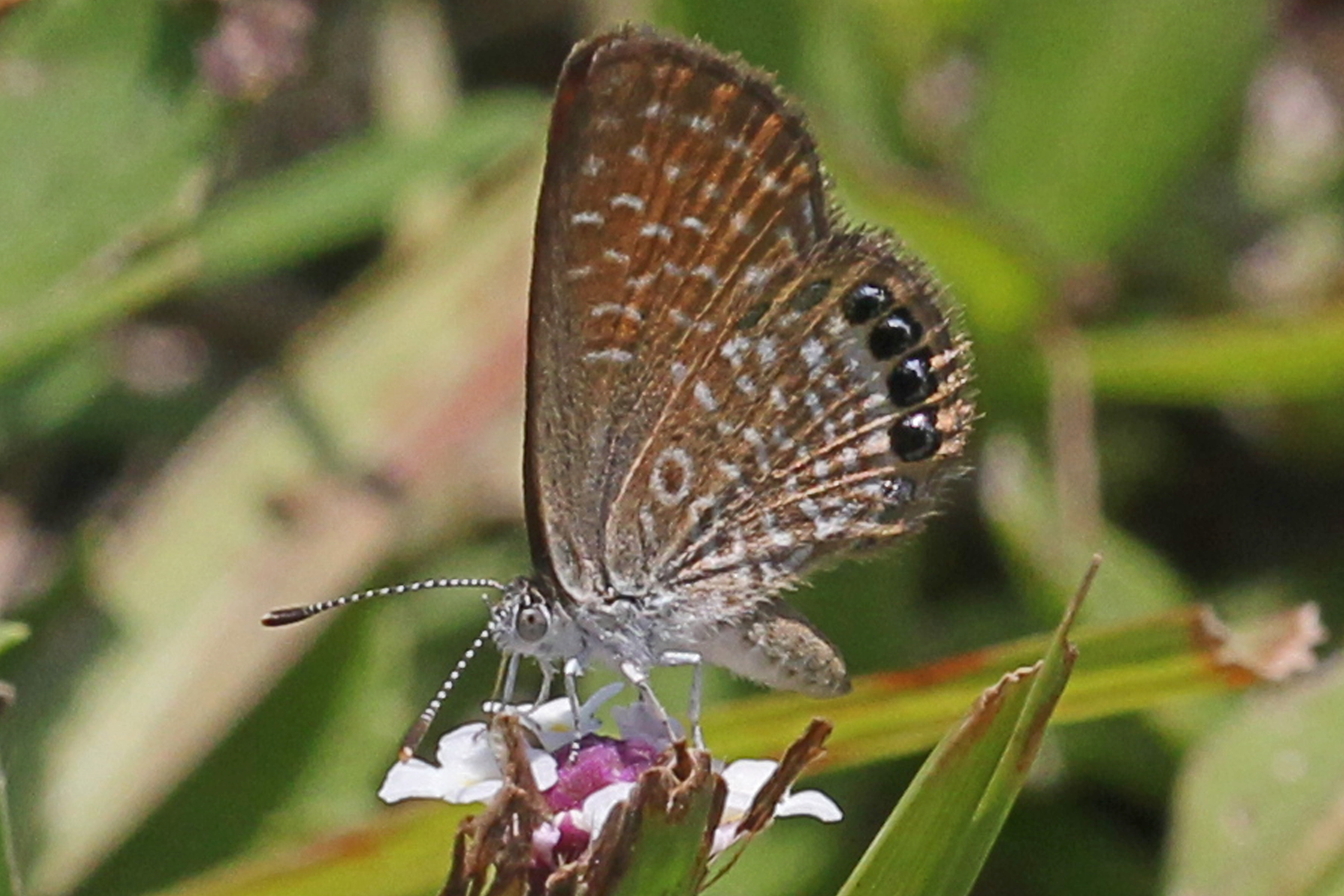
Adult

Brephidium pseudofea, the eastern pygmy-blue, is a species of blue in the butterfly family Lycaenidae. It is found in the southern United States, typically in coastal saltmarshes.

== Subspecies ==
These two subspecies belong to the species Brephidium pseudofea:

- Brephidium pseudofea insularis Pavulaan & Gatrelle, 1999
- Brephidium pseudofea pseudofea (Morrison, 1873)

== Biology ==
In Georgia, the eastern pygmy-blue is the smallest butterfly, where it lives along coastal portions of southeastern Georgia. It is a blue butterfly with a row of four silvery black spots along the ventral hindwing margin. Adults have a low, weak flight pattern and flutter just above the surface of host plants. Adults appear from May to August.
