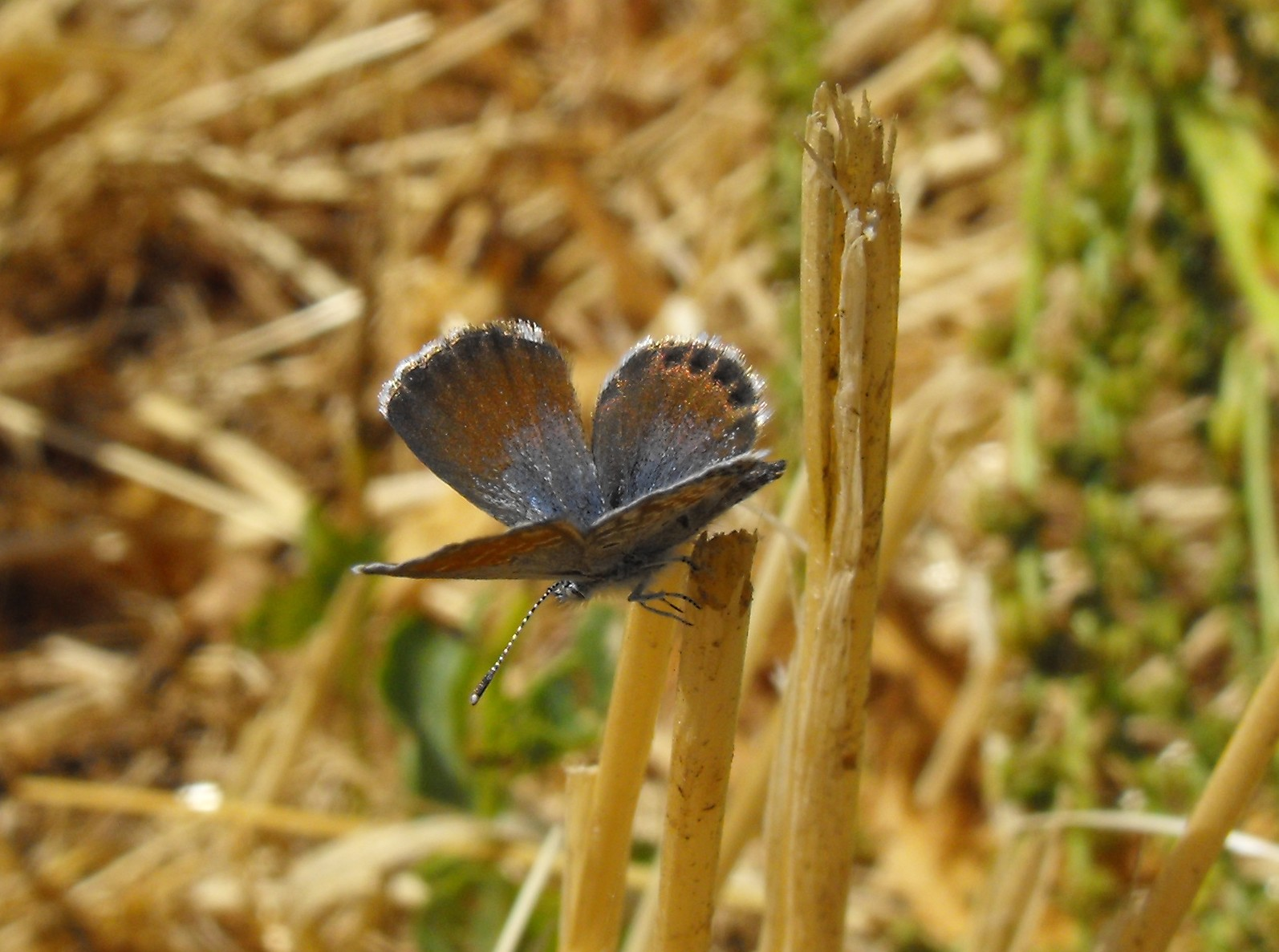
- B. e. exilis, California
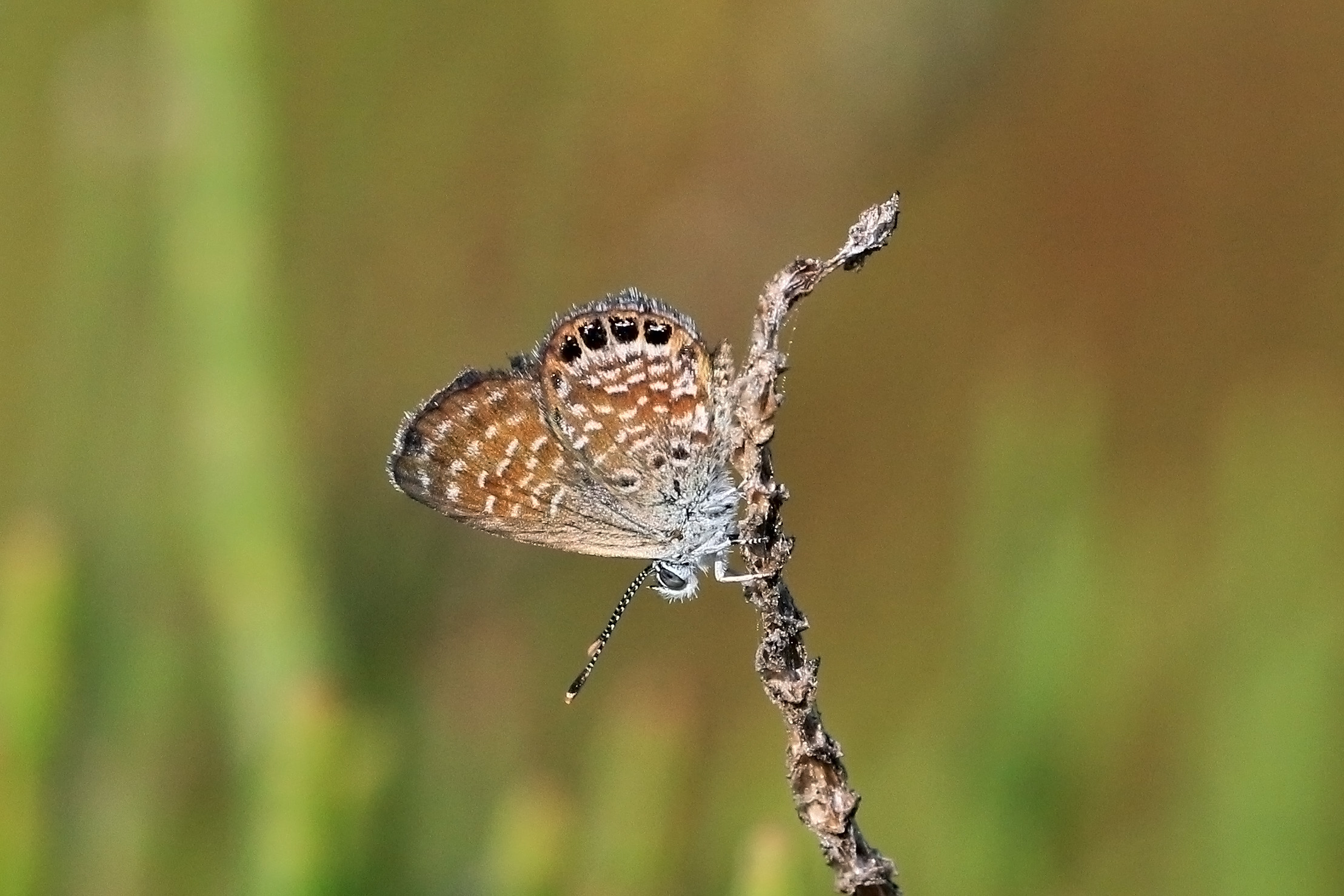
- B. e. thompsoni, Grand Cayman

Conservation status
- Apparently Secure (NatureServe)

Scientific classification
- Kingdom: Animalia
- Phylum: Arthropoda
- Clade: Pancrustacea
- Class: Insecta
- Order: Lepidoptera
- Family: Lycaenidae
- Genus: Brephidium
- Species: B. exilis

Binomial name
- Brephidium exilis (Boisduval, 1852)

Synonyms
- Lycaena exilis Boisduval, 1852; Lycaena fea Edwards, 1871; Brephidium exilis ab. coolidgei Gunder, 1925; Brephidium exilis yucateca Clench, 1970; Lycaena isophthalma Herrich-Schäffer, 1862; Brephidium barbouri Clench, 1943; Brephidium exilis thompsoni Carpenter & Lewis, 1943

= Western pygmy blue =

Species of butterfly

The western pygmy blue (Brephidium exilis or Brephidium exile) is one of the smallest butterflies in the world and the smallest in North America. It has reached Hawaii, as well as the Persian Gulf, including Kuwait, eastern Saudi Arabia, Bahrain and the United Arab Emirates.

== Description ==
The upperside is copper brown with dull blue at the bases of both wings. The underside of the hindwing is copper brown with white at the base; the fringe mostly white, with 3 small black spots near base, and a row of black spots at outer margin. The wingspan is 12–20 mm.

== Biology ==
Males establish a territory in which they look for receptive females to mate with. After mating, females lay eggs on all parts of the host plant, oftenmost on the uppersides of leaves. The caterpillars eat all parts of the plant; host species include Pigweed (Chenopodium album), saltbush species (Atriplex), and others in the goosefoot family (Chenopodiaceae). Adult imagos appear in July–September in the north, while it appears year round in South Texas. Adults feed on nectar only.

== Distribution and habitat ==
This butterfly can be found in alkaline areas such as deserts, salt marshes, and barren areas. They are common across their natural range, which includes the Southwestern United States from California eastwards to west Texas, and from Mexico to Venezuela. It may migrate to Arkansas, Nebraska, and Oregon. Its introduced range includes the United Arab Emirates, Bahrain, and eastern Saudi Arabia along the Persian Gulf coast up to Kuwait. It recently colonized the Tampa Bay area of Florida.

== Subspecies ==
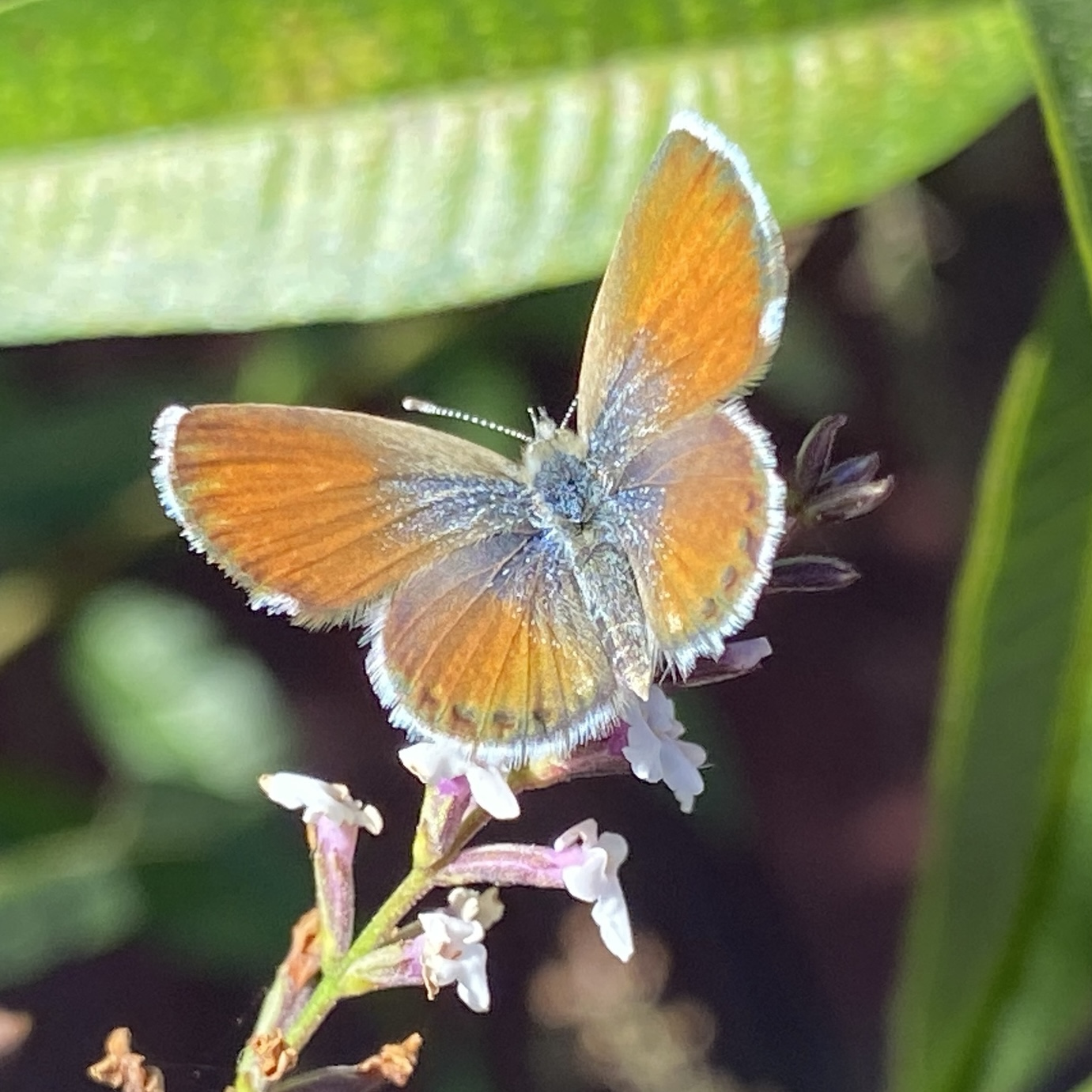
Brephidium exilis exilis in California

There are four subspecies:

- Brephidium exilis exilis (Texas, New Mexico, Arizona, Nevada, California, Mexico, New Orleans to Florida)
- Brephidium exilis isophthalma (Herrich-Schäffer, 1862) (Cuba, Jamaica, Hispaniola, Bahamas)
- Brephidium exilis thompsoni (Carpenter & Lewis, 1943) (Grand Cayman)
- Brephidium exilis yucateca Clench, 1970 (Yucatán peninsula)

== Images ==
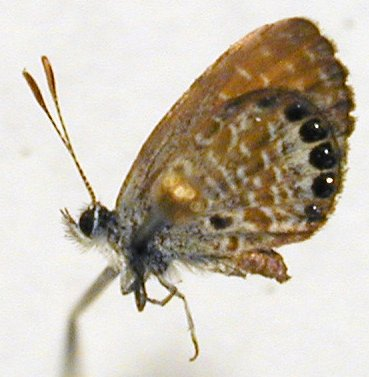
Lateral view of an adult

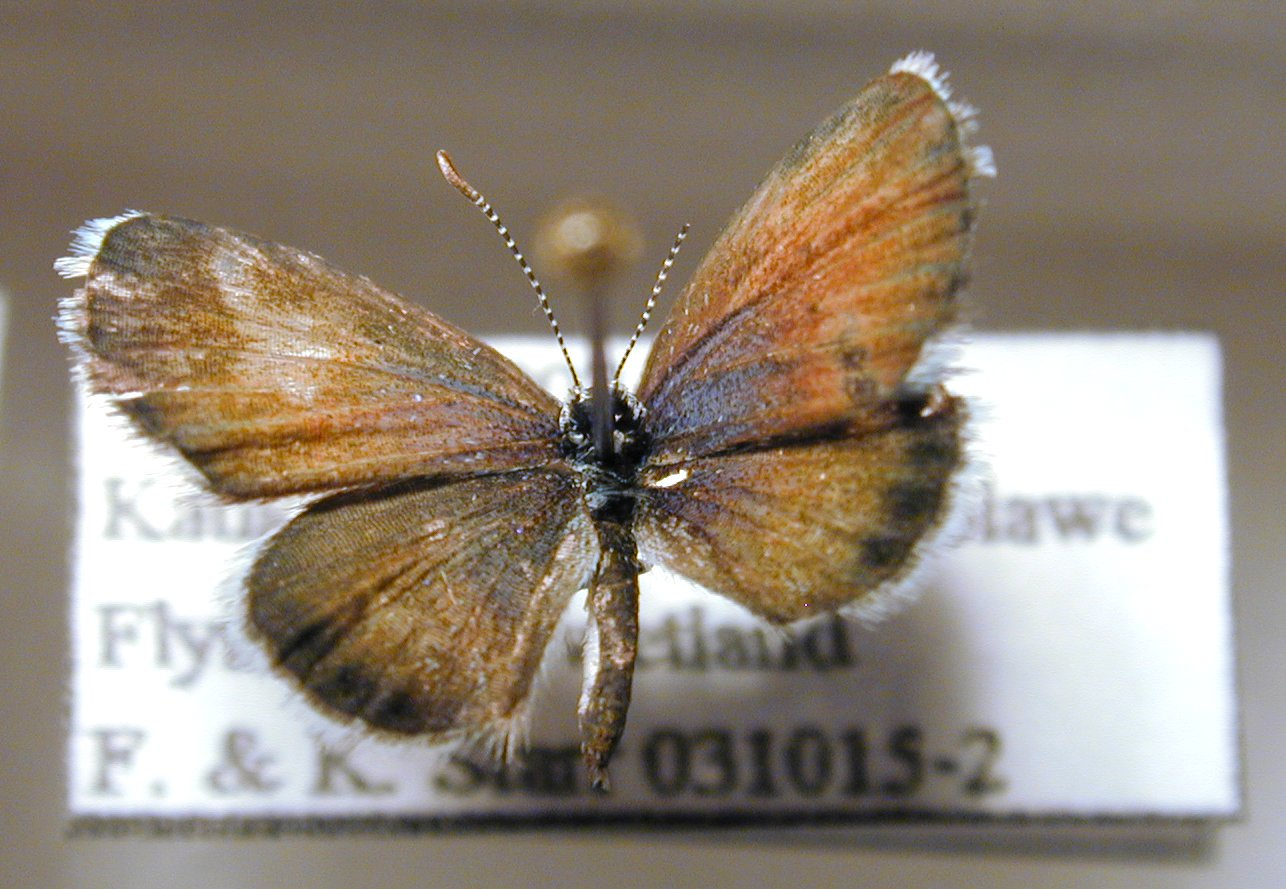
Pinned specimen

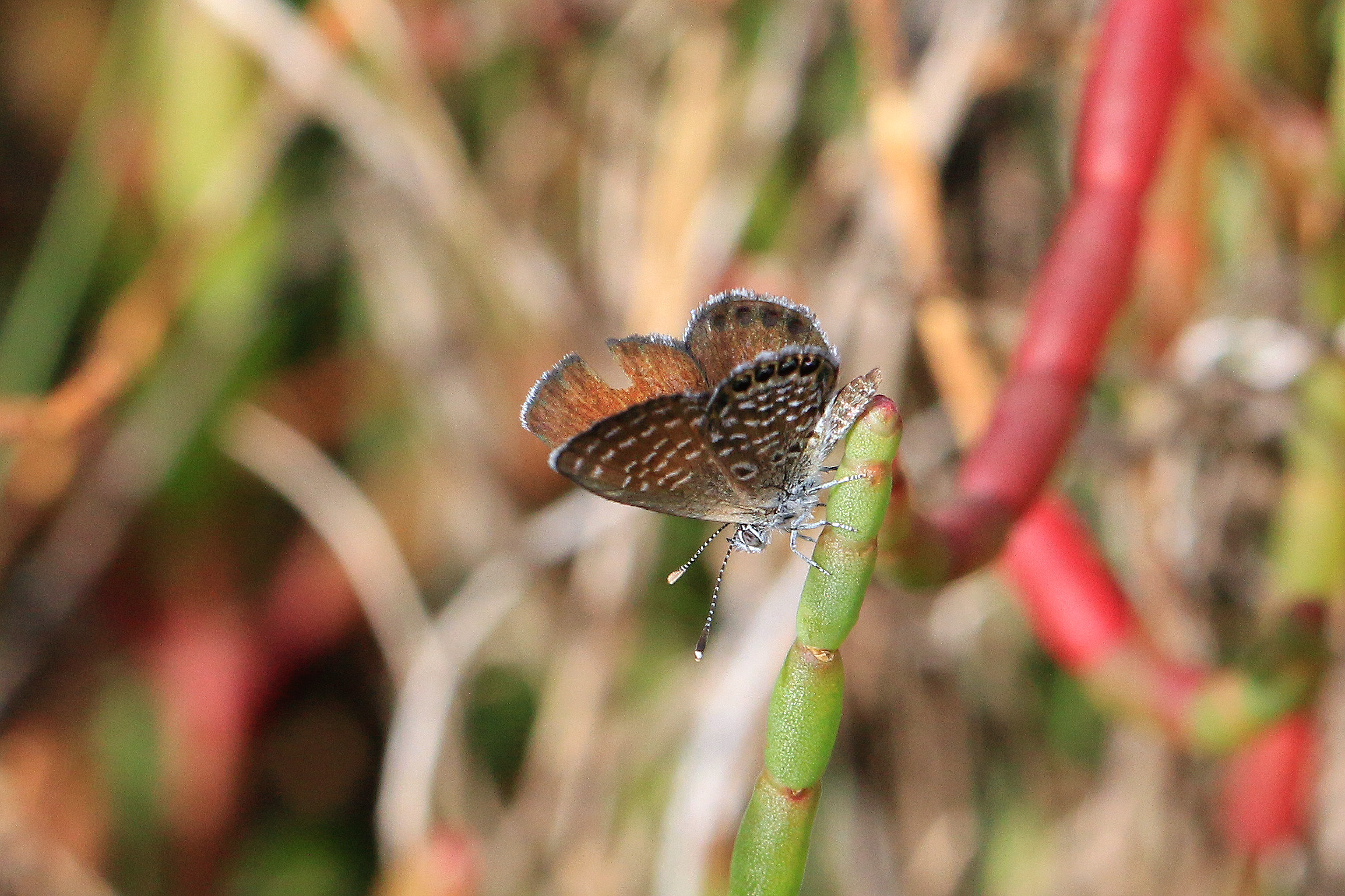
B. e. thompsoni, Grand Cayman

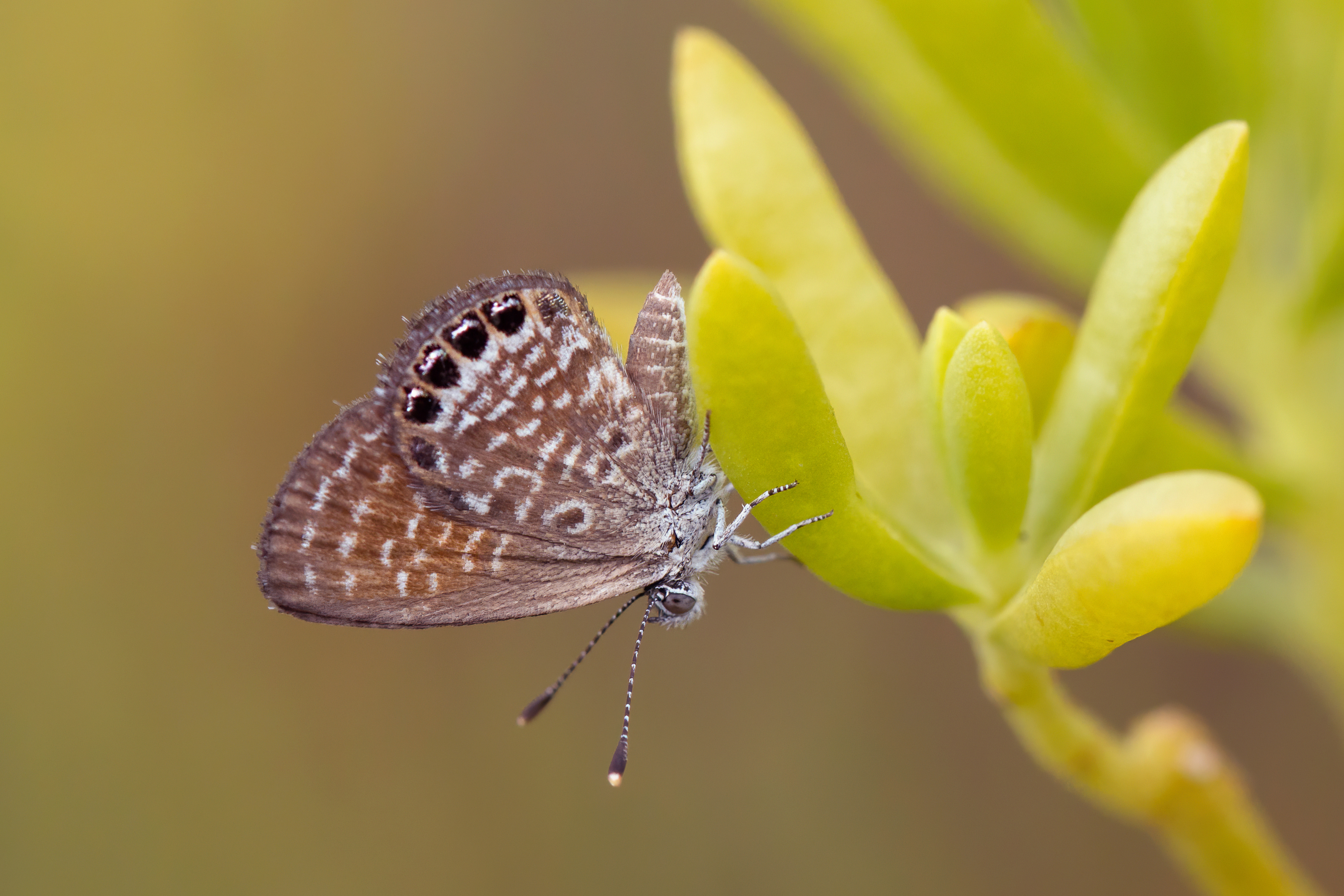
B. e. thompsoni, Grand Cayman

== See also ==
- Smallest organisms
