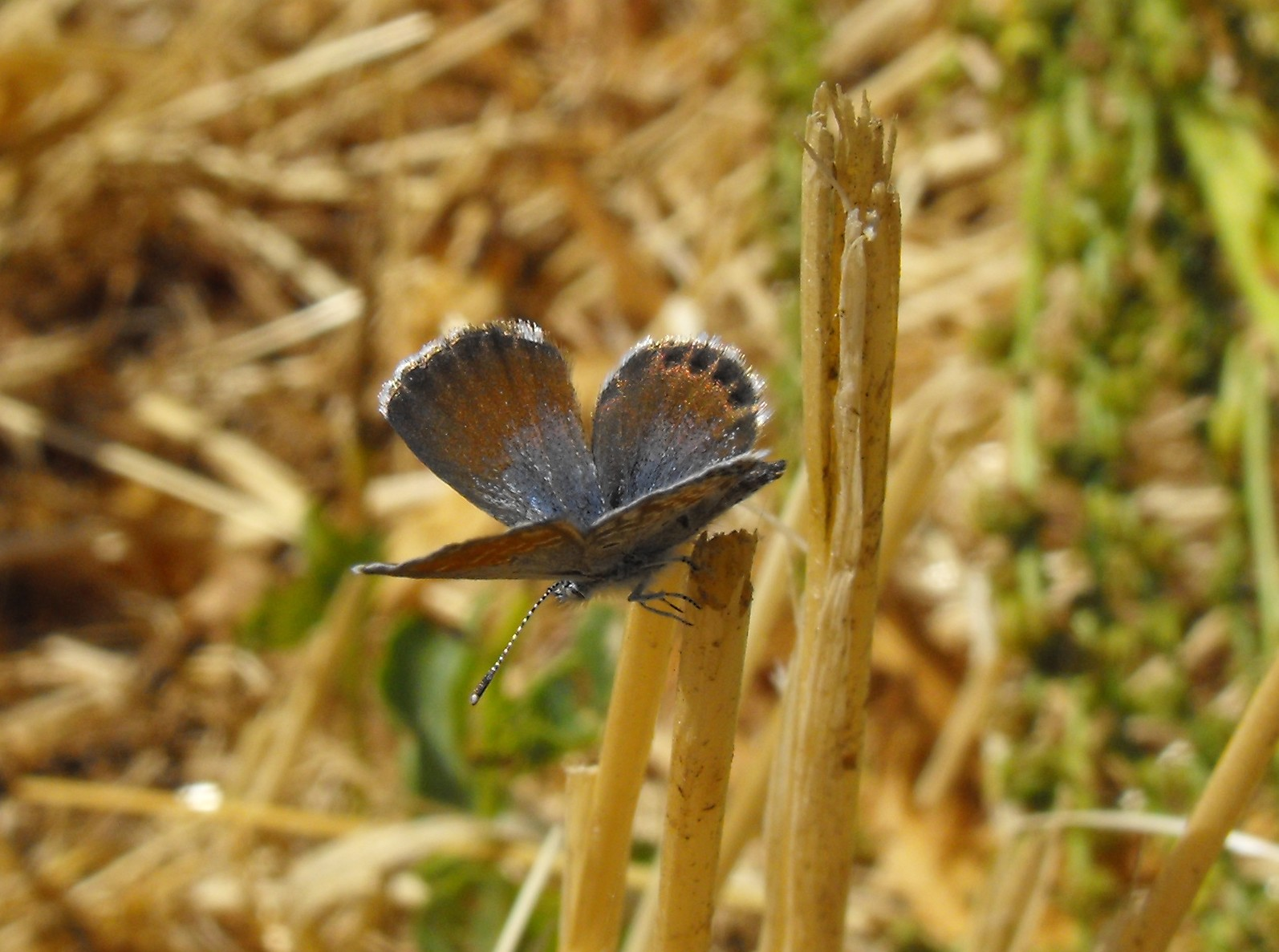
- Brephidium exilis

Scientific classification
- Domain: Eukaryota
- Kingdom: Animalia
- Phylum: Arthropoda
- Class: Insecta
- Order: Lepidoptera
- Family: Lycaenidae
- Subfamily: Polyommatinae
- Tribe: Polyommatini
- Genus: Brephidium; Scudder, 1876

= Brephidium =

Butterfly genus in family Lycaenidae

Brephidium is a genus of butterflies in the family Lycaenidae. They are known commonly as pygmy blues. The species of this genus have a disjunct distribution. Two of the three species are found in the Americas while the third is found in Africa.

== Species ==
The following three species are in the genus Brephidium:

- Brephidium exilis (Boisduval, 1852) – western pygmy blue (southern United States to South America)
- Brephidium metophis (Wallengren, 1860) – South Africa, Namibia, Botswana, Mozambique, Zimbabwe
- Brephidium pseudofea (Morrison, 1873) – eastern pygmy blue (southeastern United States)
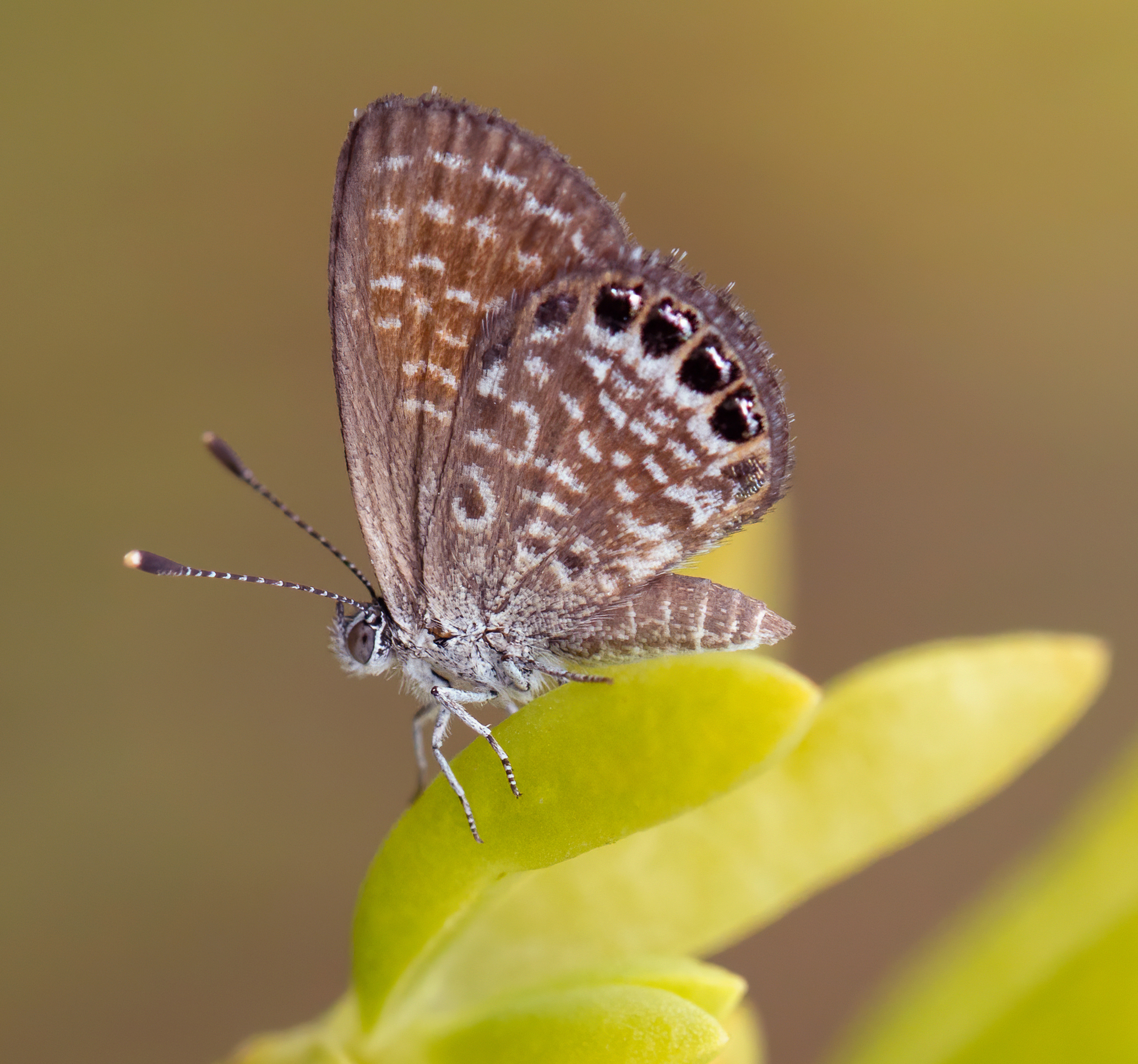
Brephidium exilis

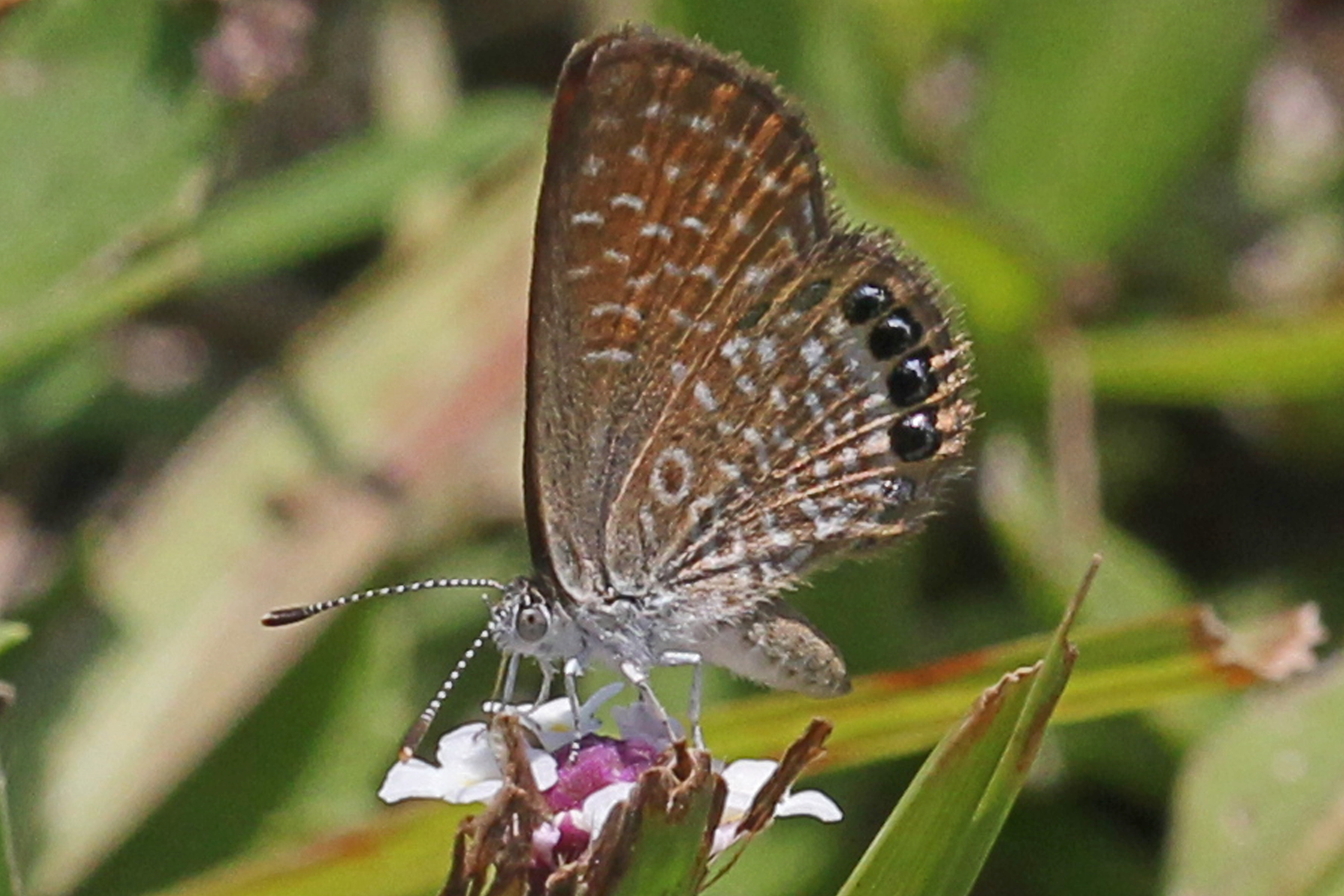
Brephidium pseudofea
