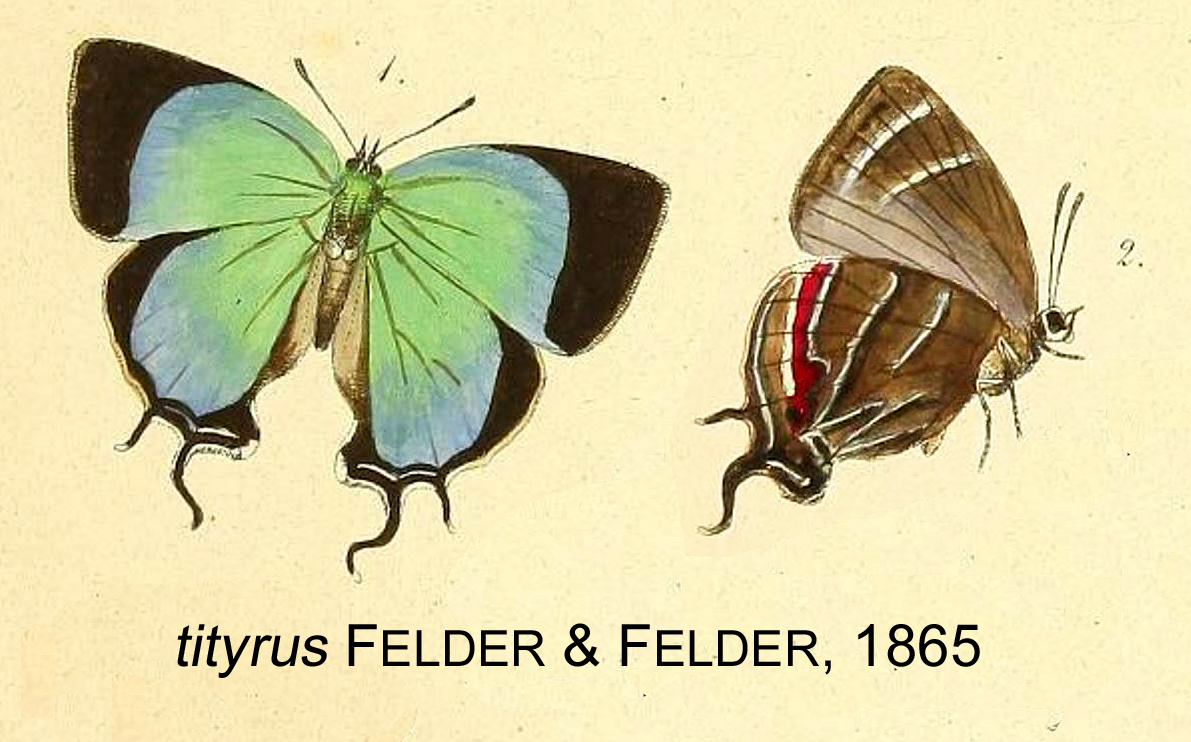
- Upperside (left) and underwing of imago

Scientific classification
- Kingdom: Animalia
- Phylum: Arthropoda
- Class: Insecta
- Order: Lepidoptera
- Family: Lycaenidae
- Subfamily: Theclinae
- Tribe: Eumaeini
- Genus: Balintus d'Abrera, 2001
- Species: B. tityrus

Binomial name
- Balintus tityrus (C. & R. Felder, 1865)

= Balintus =

Monotypic butterfly genus in family Lycaenidae

Balintus is a gossamer-winged butterfly genus of the tribe Eumaeini in the subfamily Theclinae. Its only known species, Balintus tityrus, is found in the Neotropical realm, where it is endemic to Colombia.

It is generally agreed that this butterfly represents a distinct lineage and is worthy of recognition at least as subgenus. However, there is some dispute about whether the name was validly established, or is a nomen nudum. The matter has been submitted to the ICZN for discussion.
