= Julius Busa =

Austro-Hungarian flying ace

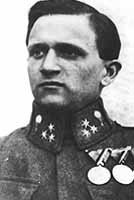
- Born: Gyula Busa; 18 February 1891; Budapest, Hungary
- Died: 13 May 1917 (aged 26); Near Plava, Italy
- Military career
- Allegiance: Austro-Hungarian Empire
- Branch: Austro-Hungarian Aviation Troops
- Service years: 1914–1917
- Rank: Feldwebel
- Units: Fliegerkompanie 14; Fluggeschwader I
- Conflicts: World War I; Eastern Front; Italian Front; Battles of the Isonzo †
- Awards: Gold Medal for Bravery; Two First Class and one Second Class Silver Medals for Bravery

Feldwebel Julius Busa (18 February 1891 – 13 May 1917) was an Austro-Hungarian World War I flying ace credited with five aerial victories during 1916. He was also notable for twice surviving direct hits by antiaircraft shells, saving his aircraft and aerial observer on both occasions. Busa scored all his aerial victories while engaged in general purpose missions in two-seater reconnaissance airplanes. His valor would be rewarded with Austria-Hungary's highest award for non-commissioned officers, the Gold Medal for Bravery. He also won three Silver Medals for Bravery—two First Class and one Second Class. Busa was killed in action by Francesco Baracca on 13 May 1917.

== Early life ==
Julius Busa (born Gyula Busa) was born in Budapest, Hungary, on 18 February 1891. He joined the Austro-Hungarian military when World War I broke out in 1914.

== Aviation training and posting ==
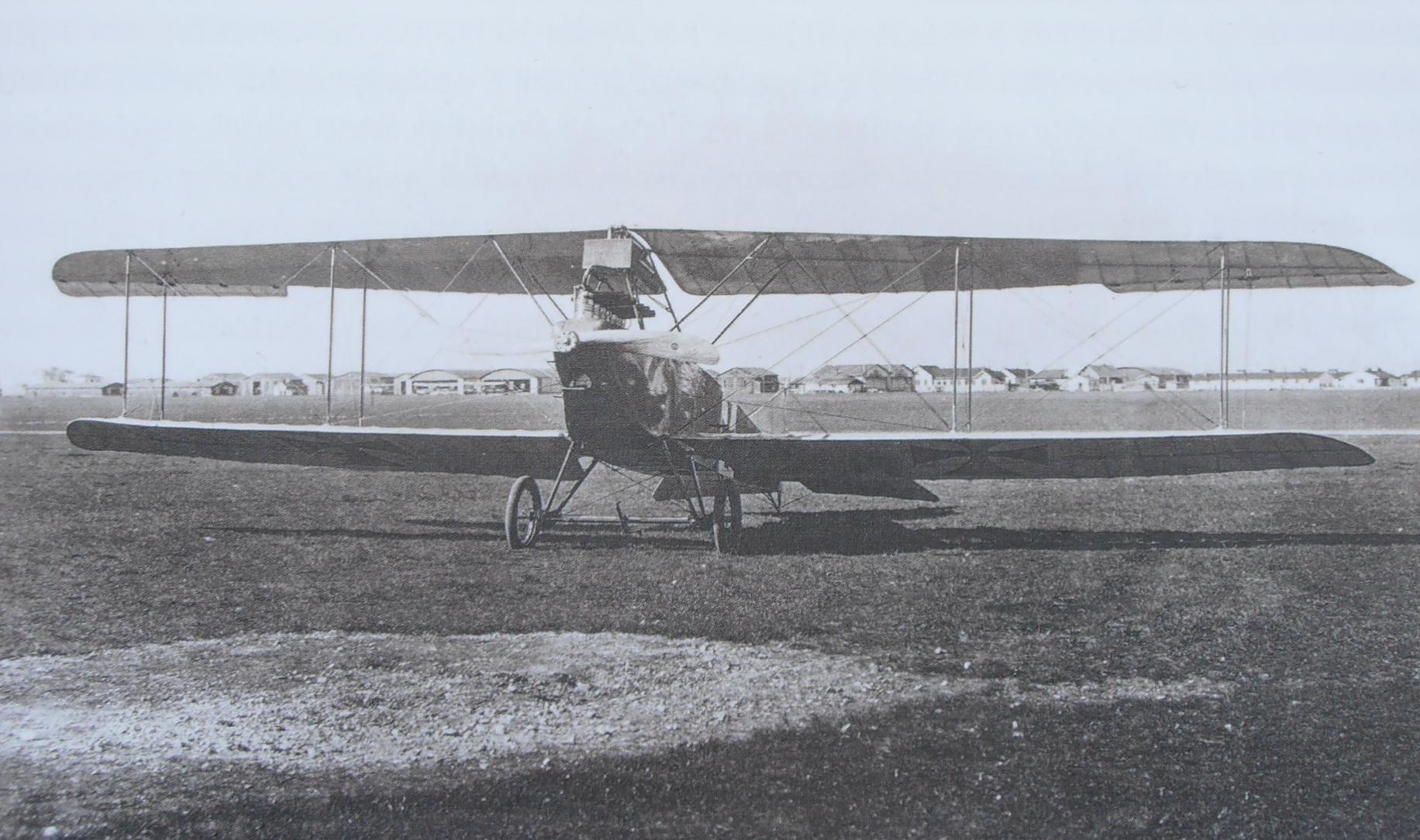
A Lloyd C.II

Busa completed pilot's training in December 1915, earning Austrian Pilot's Certificate No. 294. His first assignment was to a general service squadron, Fliegerkompanie 14, on the Russian Front. There he flew various two-seater reconnaissance aircraft—the Lloyd C.II, the Aviatik B.II, and the Hansa-Brandenburg C.I among them.

By 10 January 1916, he had flown enough missions to qualify for the Field Pilot's Badge; two weeks later, it was presented to Busa. Meanwhile, on 18 January, he survived a direct hit by an antiaircraft shell and managed to return to base. On 1 February 1916, he was promoted to sergeant. On 4 June 1916, he took a direct hit from an anti-aircraft shell for the second time; however, he continued his flight, completed his mission, and received a commendation.

== Aerial victories ==
On the evening of 23 June 1916, Busa was credited with using a Lloyd C.II to force two Russian biplanes to land at Rudnia Airfield. His observer used only 60 rounds of ammunition in the skirmish. Busa's prowess did not go unrewarded. He was granted several Medals for Bravery; a Second Class Silver award was followed by two First Class Silvers. He was also promoted to Feldwebel on 20 October 1916.

Also in October 1916, Busa and his squadron were transferred to northern Italy. On 23 November 1916, while flying a Hansa-Brandenburg C.I, Busa was credited with three aerial victories. Colonel Emil Uzelac signed off on a commendation for Busa's pilot, then scrawled upon its margin, "Who was the NCO pilot?" Subsequently, Busa was awarded the premier decoration for Austro-Hungarian non-commissioned officers, the Gold Medal for Bravery.

== Death in action ==
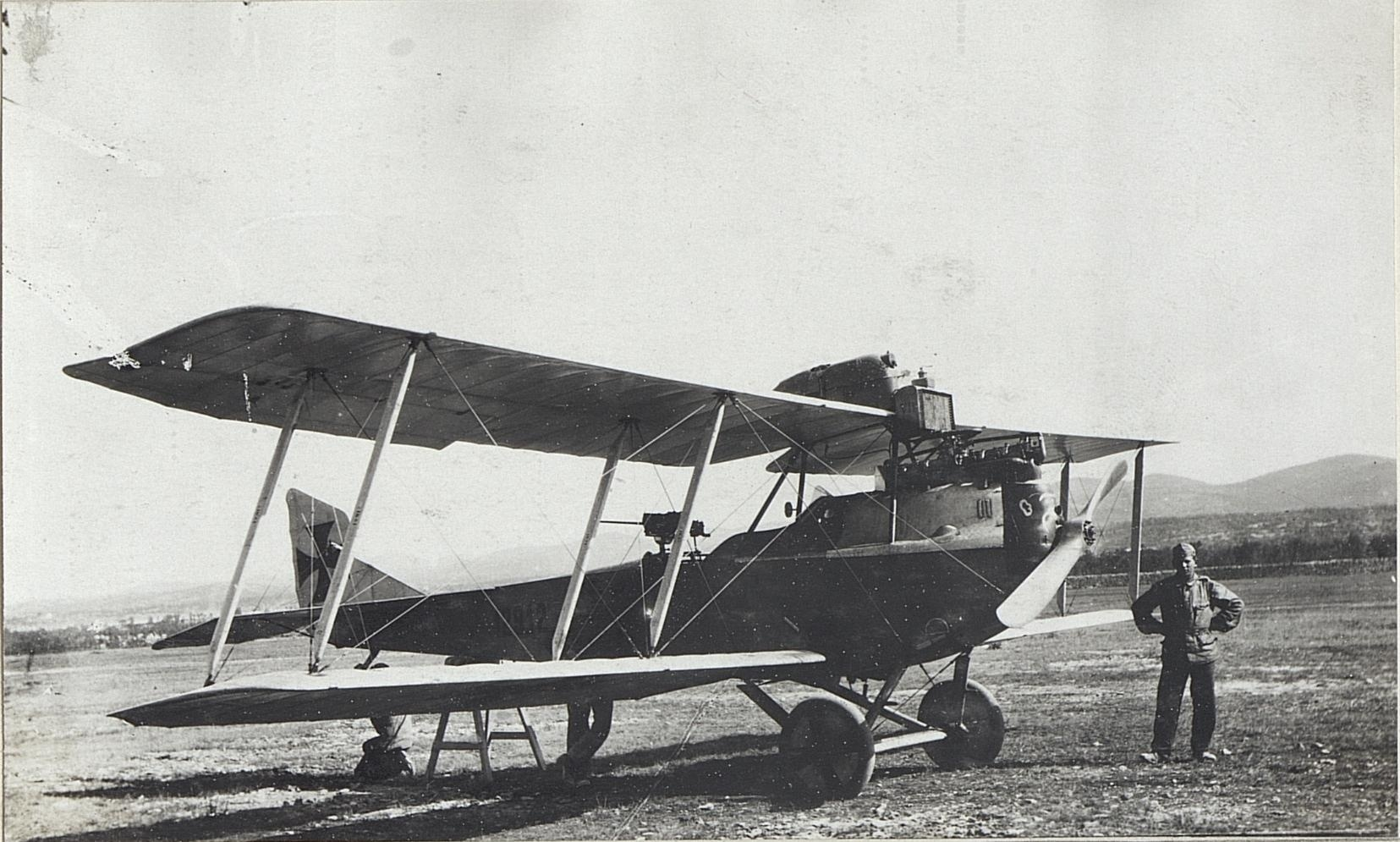
A Hansa-Brandenburg C.I

In December 1916, Busa was transferred to Fluggeschwader I. This squadron was based near Trieste and was fighting in the Battles of the Isonzo. On 13 May 1917, Busa fell under the guns of leading Italian ace Francesco Baracca. Baracca, in his new SPAD S.VII, hit Busa in a head-on pass over Plava, Italy, at 3,000 meters (9,800 ft) and set his Hansa-Brandenburg C.I afire. While Busa's observer leapt out with no parachute in desperation, Busa's body fell to earth in his burning airplane.

== Sources ==
- Franks, Norman; Guest, Russell; Alegi, Gregory (1997). Above the War Fronts: The British Two-seater Bomber Pilot and Observer Aces, the British Two-seater Fighter Observer Aces, and the Belgian, Italian, Austro-Hungarian and Russian Fighter Aces, 1914–1918. Grub Street. ISBN 978-1898697565.
- O'Connor, Martin (1994). Air Aces of the Austro-Hungarian Empire 1914 - 1918. Flying Machines Press. ISBN 978-0-9637110-1-4.
