= Bussa (butterfly) =

Scientific classification
- Domain: Eukaryota
- Kingdom: Animalia
- Phylum: Arthropoda
- Class: Insecta
- Order: Lepidoptera
- Family: Lycaenidae
- Genus: Bussa; Johnson, Kruse & Kroenlein, 1997

Butterfly genus in family Lycaenidae

Bussa is a genus of butterflies in the family Lycaenidae. This name is preoccupied (see Thylacoptila) and replaced by Brevianta.
