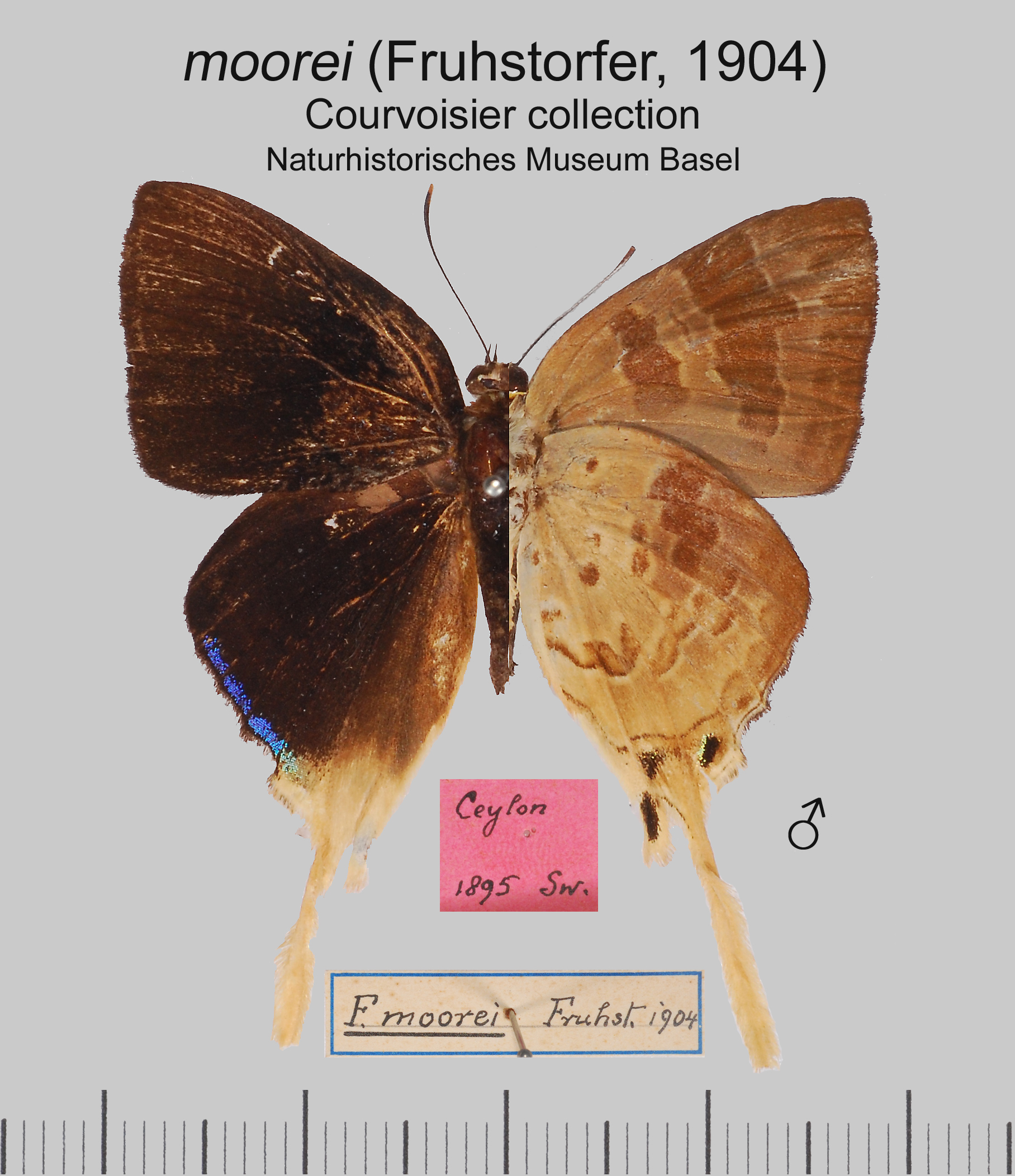
- Bindahara phocides moorei

Scientific classification
- Kingdom: Animalia
- Phylum: Arthropoda
- Class: Insecta
- Order: Lepidoptera
- Family: Lycaenidae
- Tribe: Deudorigini
- Genus: Bindahara; Moore, [1881]

Synonyms
- Rindahara Kirby, [1882] (lapsus); Stilbon Rothschild & Jordan, 1905

= Bindahara =

Butterfly genus in family Lycaenidae

Bindahara is a genus of butterflies in the family Lycaenidae. The species of this genus are found in the Indomalayan and Australasian realms.

== Species ==
- Bindahara phocides (Fabricius, 1793) - plane
- Bindahara arfaki Bethune-Baker, 1913 New Guinea
- Bindahara meeki (Rothschild & Jordan, 1905) New Guinea and Halmahera Island
