= Nansel Bussa =

Nigerian footballer

Personal information
- Date of birth: 15 June 2003 (age 23)
- Position: Forward

Team information
- Current team: Ifeanyi Ubah
- Number: 10

Senior career*
| Years | Team | Apps | (Gls) |
| 2019– | Ifeanyi Ubah | 2 | (0) |
- * Club domestic league appearances and goals as of 14:44, 12 April 2020 (UTC)

Nansel Bussa (born 15 June 2003) is a Nigerian footballer who currently plays as a forward for Ifeanyi Ubah.

== Career statistics ==
=== Club ===
As of 12 April 2020.

| Club | Season | League | | | Cup | | Continental | | Other | | Total | |
| Club | Season | Division | Apps | Goals | Apps | Goals | Apps | Goals | Apps | Goals | Apps | Goals |
|---|---|---|---|---|---|---|---|---|---|---|---|---|
| Ifeanyi Ubah | 2019 | NPFL | 2 | 0 | 0 | 0 | – | | 1 (Note: Appearances in the NPFL Playoffs) | 0 | 3 | 0 |
| Career total | | | 2 | 0 | 0 | 0 | 0 | 0 | 1 | 0 | 3 | 0 |
