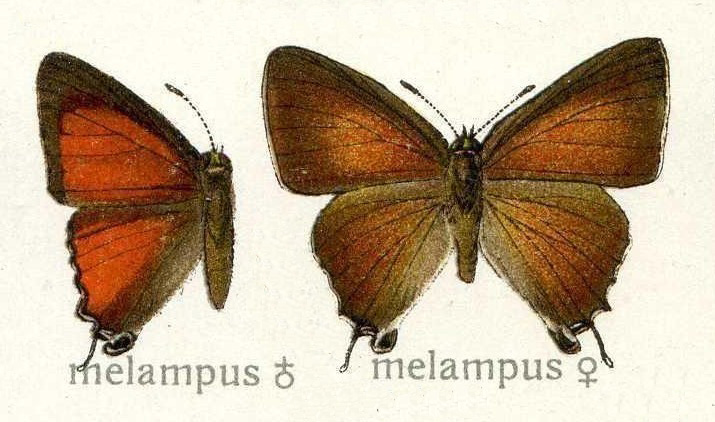
- Male left, female right

Scientific classification
- Domain: Eukaryota
- Kingdom: Animalia
- Phylum: Arthropoda
- Class: Insecta
- Order: Lepidoptera
- Family: Lycaenidae
- Genus: Baspa
- Species: B. melampus

Binomial name
- Baspa melampus (Stoll, 1781)

Synonyms
- Rapala melampus

= Baspa melampus =

Species of butterfly

Baspa melampus, the Indian red flash, is a species of blue (Lycaenidae) butterfly found in South-East Asia.

== Range ==
The butterfly occurs in Sri Lanka and in India from South India to Orissa, and, in the north from Murree to Kumaon. The range extends to Peninsular Malaysia, Singapore, Sumatra, Borneo and Bangka.

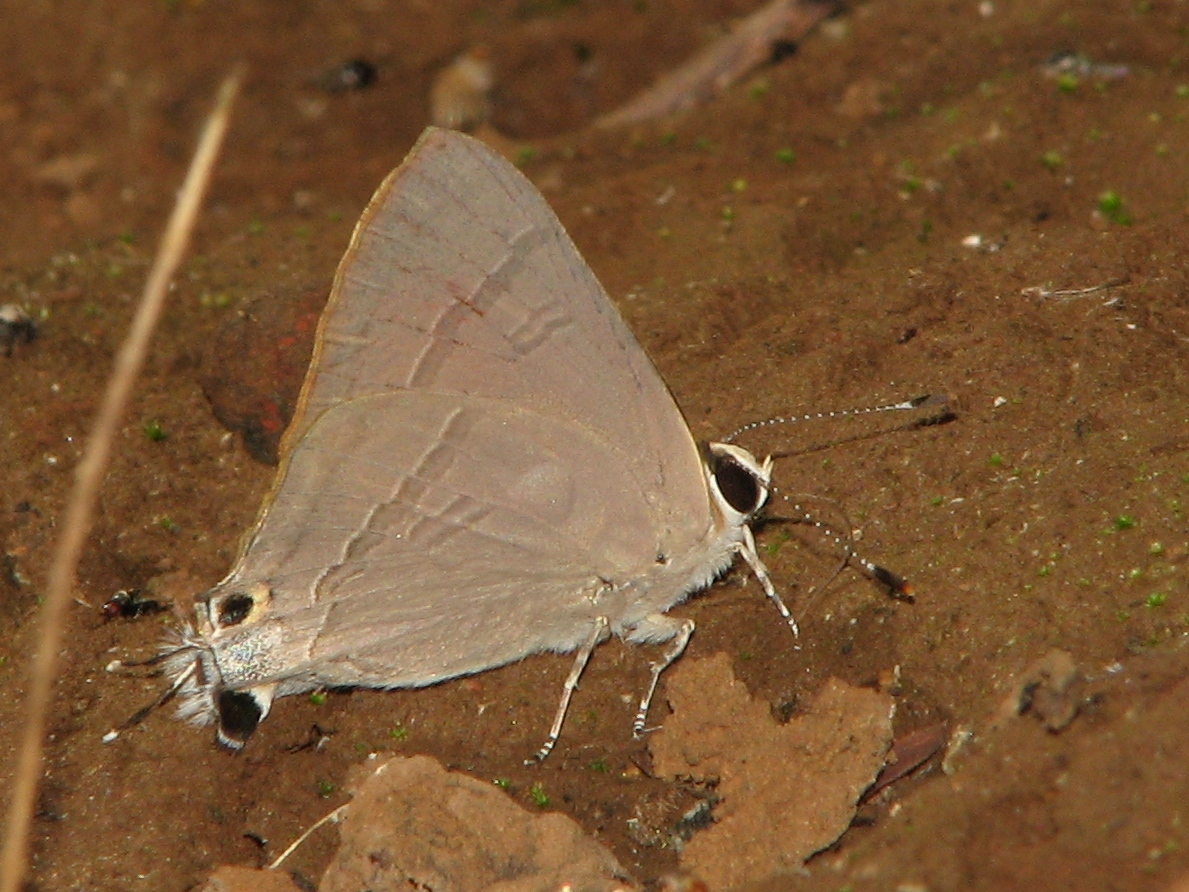

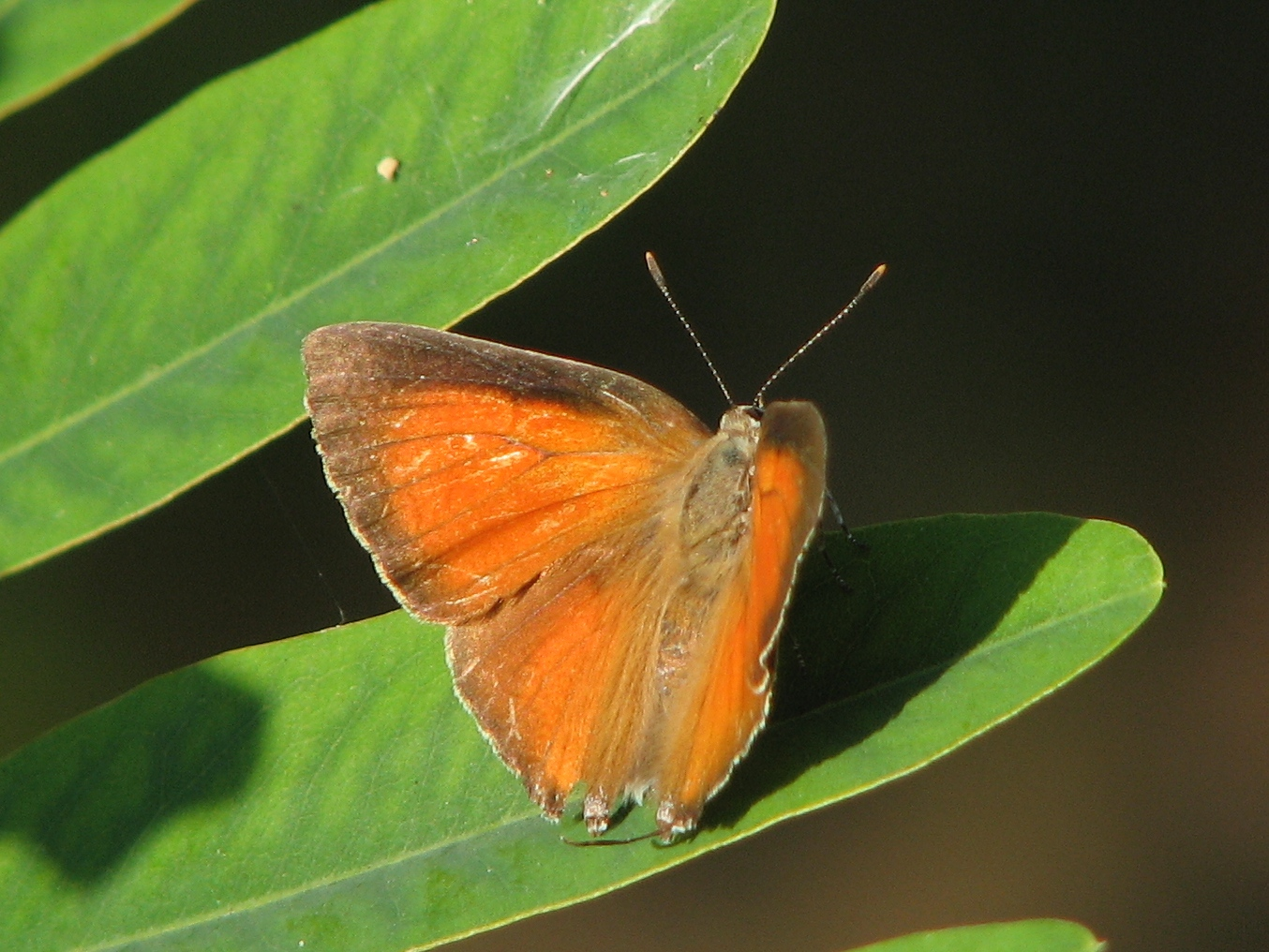

== Taxonomy ==
The butterfly was previously classified as Rapala melampus (Stoll, 1781). It is also sometimes treated as a subspecies of Rapala iarbus.

== Status ==
In 1932, William Harry Evans described the species as not rare.

== See also ==
- List of butterflies of India (Lycaenidae)
