= Busa =

Busa or BUSA may refer to:

- Bussa, Nigeria, the capital of Borgu
- Busa language (Mande), spoken in Borgu
- Busa language (Papuan), New Guinea
- British Underwater Sports Association
- British Universities Sports Association, a former British organisation succeeded in 2008 by the British Universities and Colleges Sport
- Buša cattle, Bos brachyeros europeus
- Busa (surname), a surname (including a list of people with the name)
- Business Unity South Africa, the country's largest business representative organization

== See also ==
- Suzuki Hayabusa, motorcycle
- Bus (disambiguation)
