= Bergmania =

Scientific classification
- Domain: Eukaryota
- Kingdom: Animalia
- Phylum: Arthropoda
- Class: Insecta
- Order: Lepidoptera
- Family: Lycaenidae
- Genus: Bergmania; Bryk, 1946

Butterfly genus in family Lycaenidae

Bergmania is a genus of butterflies in the family Lycaenidae. The type species is Dipsas flamen Leech.
