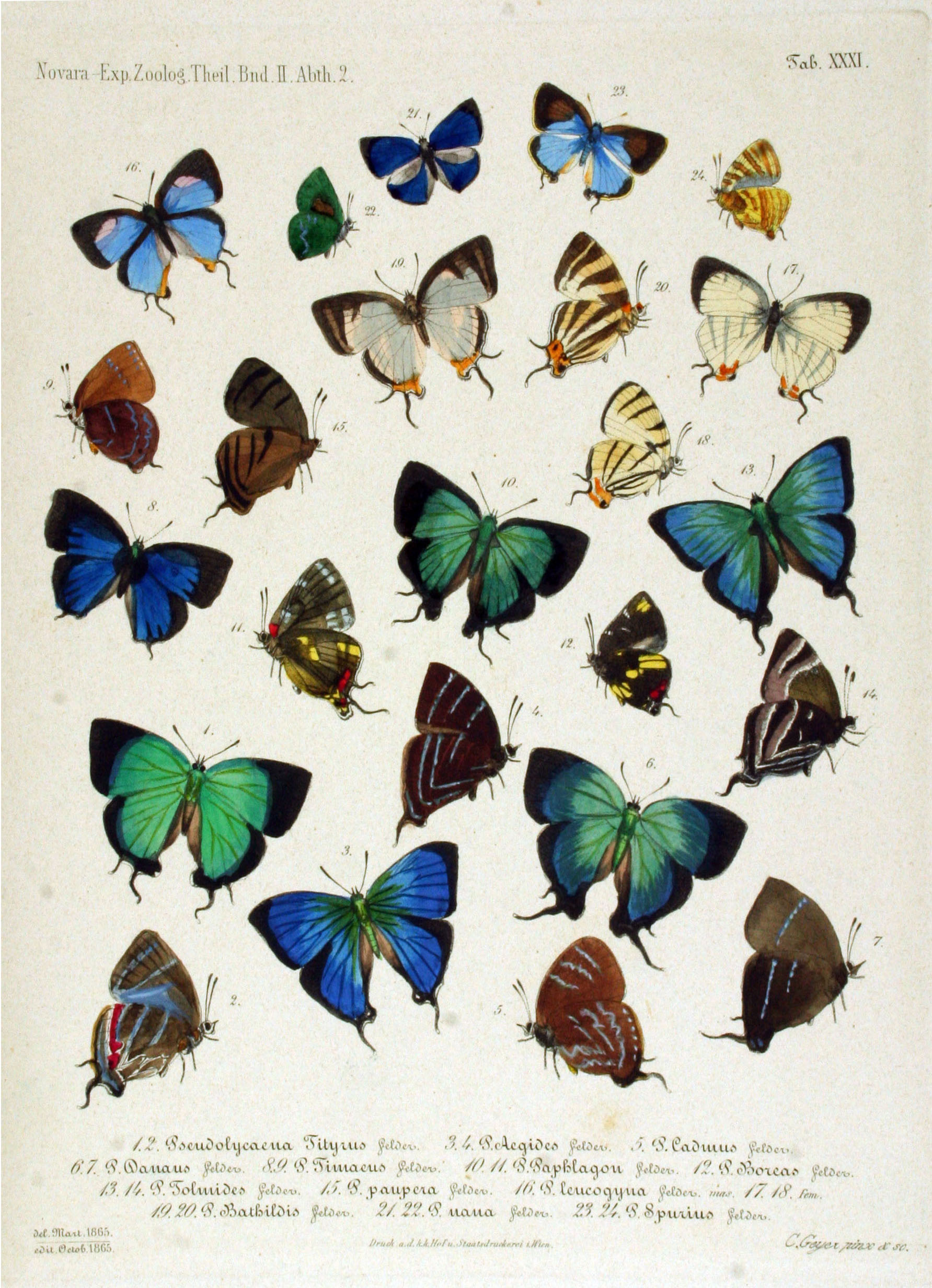
- Brevianta tolmides, figures 13 and 14 from the book of the Novara Expedition

Scientific classification
- Domain: Eukaryota
- Kingdom: Animalia
- Phylum: Arthropoda
- Class: Insecta
- Order: Lepidoptera
- Family: Lycaenidae
- Tribe: Eumaeini
- Genus: Brevianta; Johnson, Kruse & Kroenlein, 1997

= Brevianta =

Butterfly genus in family Lycaenidae

Brevianta is a genus of butterflies in the family Lycaenidae. The species of this genus are found in the Neotropical realm.

== Species ==
- Brevianta busa (Godman & Salvin, [1887])
- Brevianta perpenna (Godman & Salvin, [1887])
- Brevianta undulata (Hewitson, 1867)
- Brevianta undulella (Strand, 1918)
- Brevianta ematheon (Cramer, [1777])
- Brevianta celelata (Hewitson, 1874)
- Brevianta tolmides (C. & R. Felder, 1865)
- Brevianta hyas (Godman & Salvin, [1887])
