= Thomas Algernon Chapman =

Scottish entomologist (1842–1921)

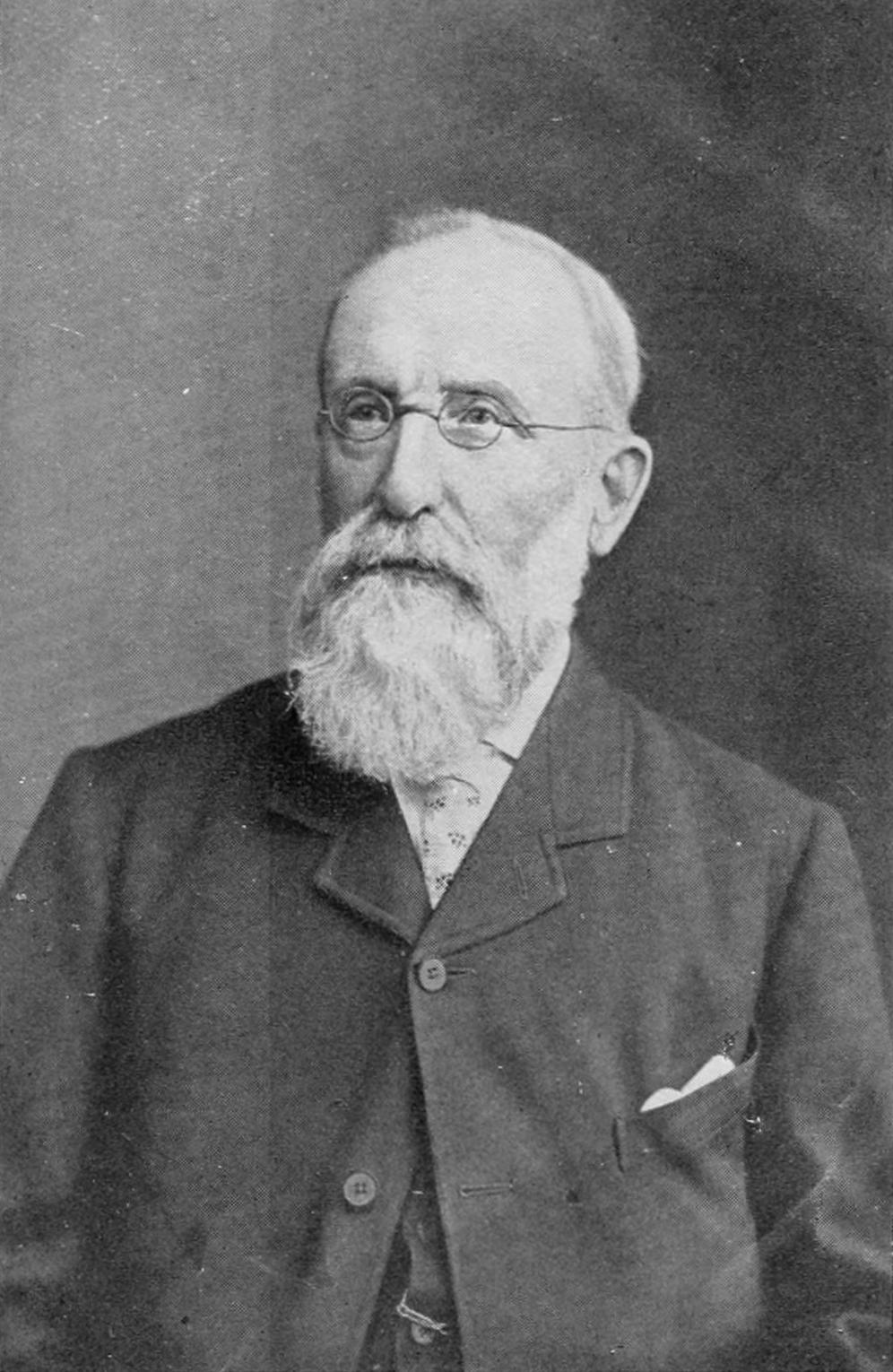
Thomas Algernon Chapman

Thomas Algernon Chapman (2 July 1842, Glasgow – 17 December 1921) was a Scottish physician and entomologist. He collected and studied wood-feeding beetles, lepidoptera and sawflies.

Chapman was born in Glasgow where his father, Thomas, a physician also took an interest in entomology. Like his father he too trained as a physician and surgeon at Glasgow. He then worked as a physician and surgeon at the Glasgow Royal Infirmary and in 1860 he was appointed to the Counties Asylum at Abergavenny. He later became a medical superintendent at the County and City Asylum, Hereford (1871-1896). He published on medical subjects in the Journal of Mental Science. He later lived at Reigate, Surrey. In his spare time he travelled and collected natural history specimens and conducted studies on the life histories of insects. As an entomologist he specialised in Lepidoptera. He studied the life histories of a number of Lycaenidae, and examined the associations of several species with ants. He was able to use a microscope to establish that the larvae of Phengaris arion fed on the larvae of ants. He became a fellow of the Entomological Society of London in 1891, of the Zoological Society of London and the Royal Society, in 1918.
