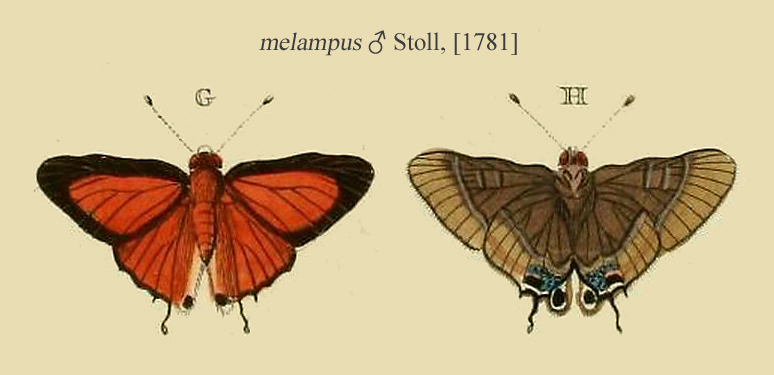
- Papilio melampus type of the genus Baspa

Scientific classification
- Kingdom: Animalia
- Phylum: Arthropoda
- Clade: Pancrustacea
- Class: Insecta
- Order: Lepidoptera
- Family: Lycaenidae
- Subfamily: Lycaeninae
- Genus: Baspa; Moore, 1882

= Baspa (butterfly) =

Butterfly genus in family Lycaenidae

Baspa is a genus of butterflies in the family Lycaenidae. The type species is Papilio melampus Stoll. It is part of Rapala.
