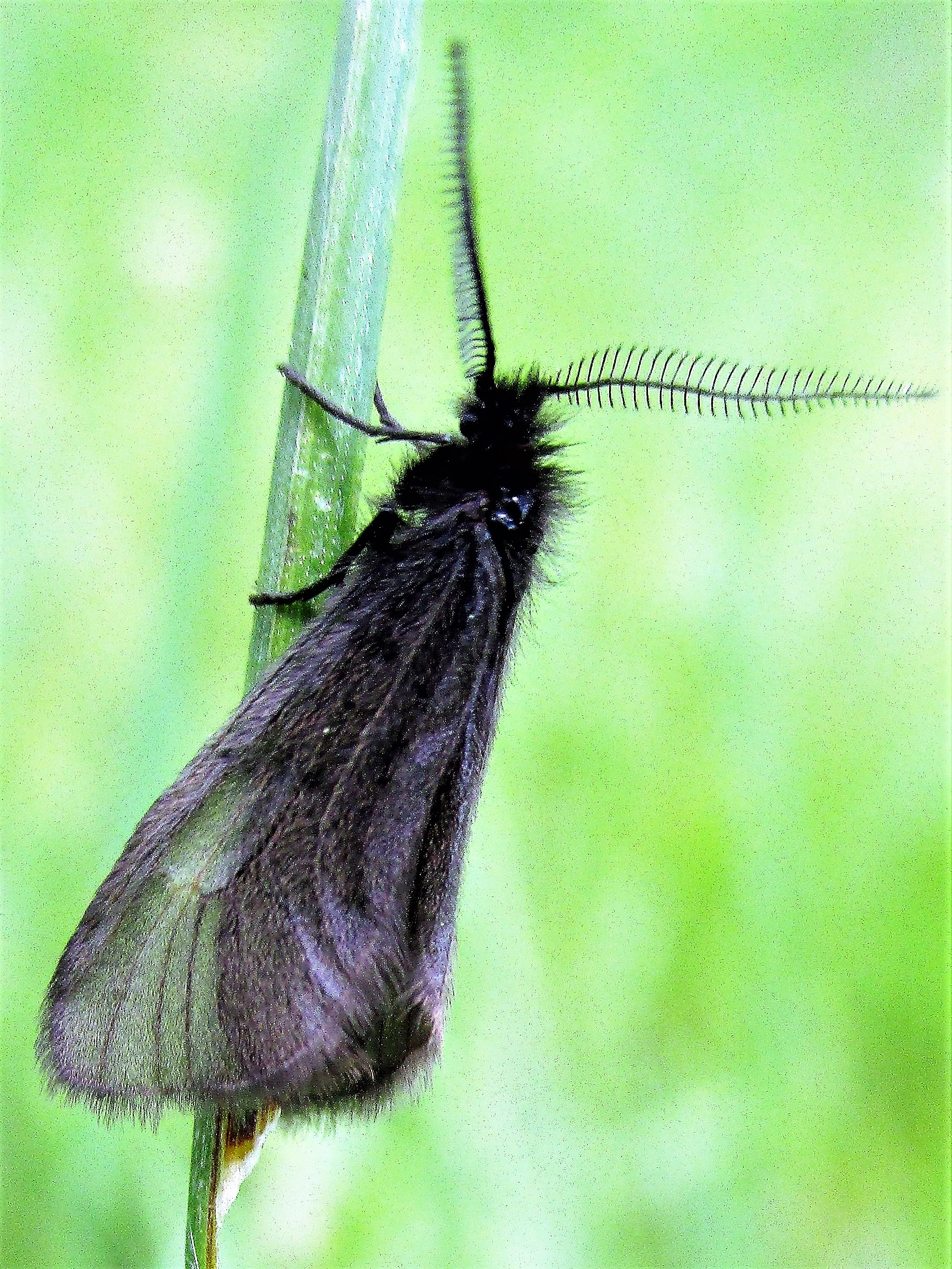
- Adult Heterogynis zikici moth

Scientific classification
- Kingdom: Animalia
- Phylum: Arthropoda
- Clade: Pancrustacea
- Class: Insecta
- Order: Lepidoptera
- Superfamily: Zygaenoidea
- Family: Heterogynidae

Genera
- See text.

= Heterogynidae =

Family of moths

The Heterogynidae are a family of insects in the order Lepidoptera. Only two genera are currently recognized: Heterogynis and Janseola.
