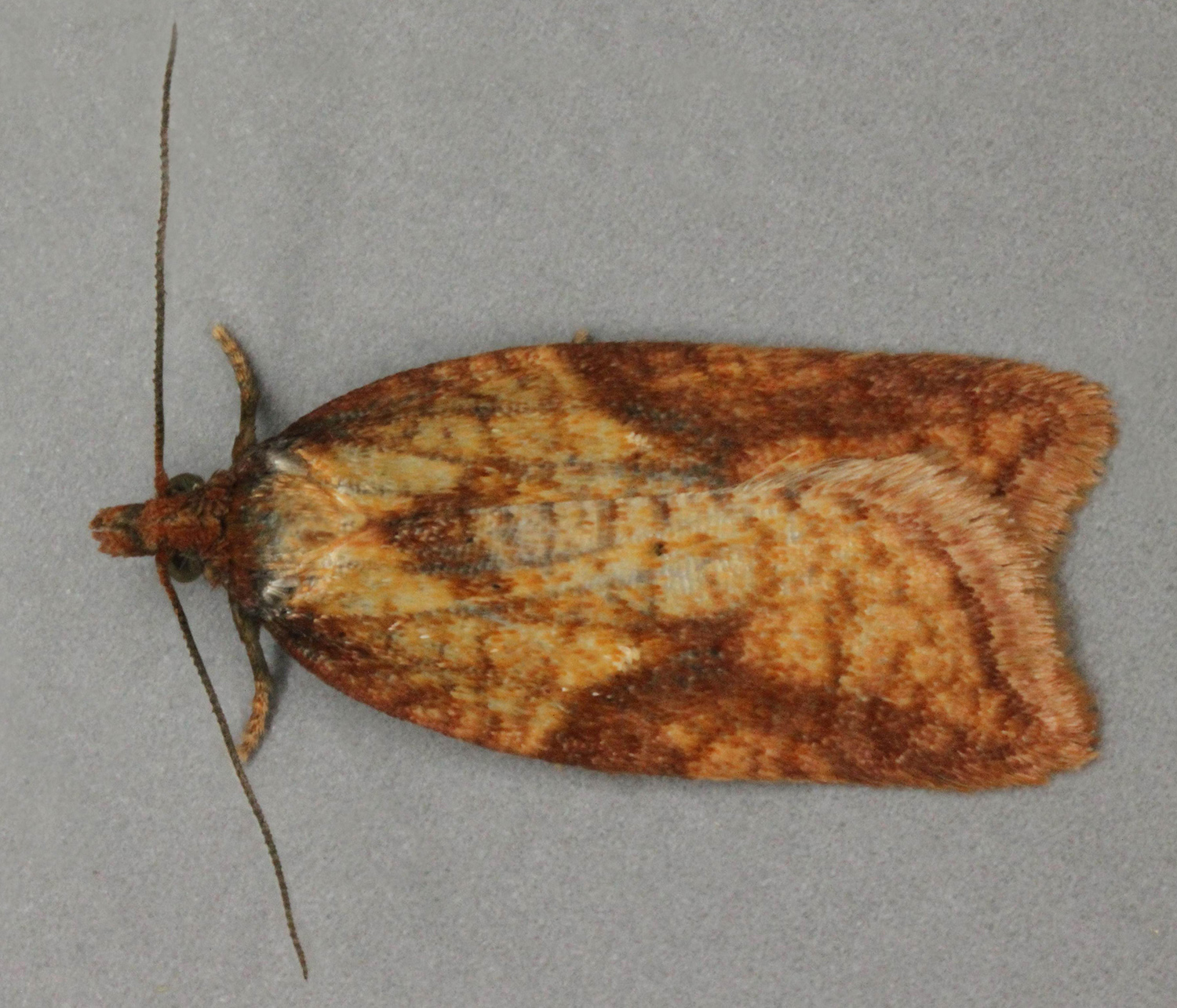
- Acleris aspersana, Minera Quarry, North Wales
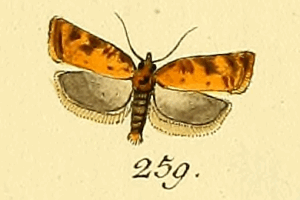

Scientific classification
- Domain: Eukaryota
- Kingdom: Animalia
- Phylum: Arthropoda
- Class: Insecta
- Order: Lepidoptera
- Family: Tortricidae
- Genus: Acleris
- Species: A. aspersana

Binomial name
- Acleris aspersana (Hubner, [1814-1817])

Synonyms
- Tortrix aspersana Hubner, [1814-1817]; Tortrix adspersana Frolich, 1828; Tortrix decosseana Ragonot, 1894; Tortrix modeeriana Zetterstedt, 1839; Acalla pedemontana Della Beffa, 1934; Paramesia subtripunctulana Stephens, 1831

= Acleris aspersana =

Species of moth

Acleris aspersana, the ginger button, is a species of moth of the family Tortricidae. It is found in Europe, where it has been recorded from Ireland, Great Britain, France, the Benelux, Germany, Denmark, Austria, Switzerland, Italy, the Czech Republic, Slovakia, Slovenia, Croatia, Hungary, Bulgaria, Romania, Poland, Norway, Sweden, Finland, the Baltic region and Russia. It is also found in the Near East and the eastern Palearctic realm. Their habitat consists of meadows and forest edges.

== Features ==
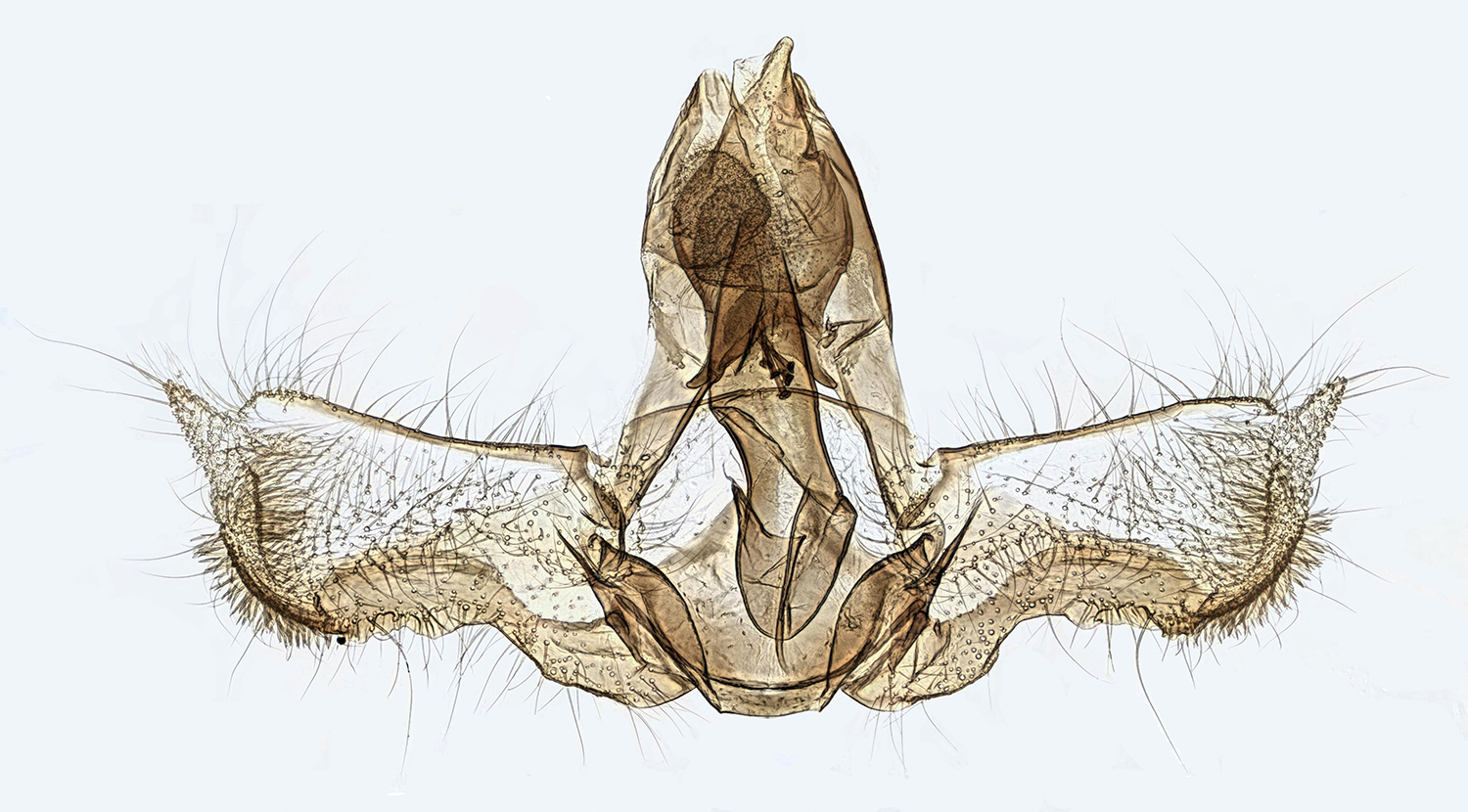
Male genitalia

The wingspan is 11–17 mm for males and 11–14 mm for females. The forewings are bright orange yellow or luteous buff, slightly irrorated with brunneous. The base of the costa also brunneous, followed by several small dots of the same colour before the middle of the costa, where a curved broad streak of the same colour arises, and extends to the apex of the wing, having a small pale patch on the costa, the apical portion of the patch more distinctly marked with three or four darker oblique abbreviated dashes, along the apical margin of the wing is also a slender line of brunneous. The hind wings are shining and very pale brown.

Adults are on wing from July to August.

== Larva ==
The larvae feed from within rolled-up leaves of various herbaceous plants, including Spiraea, Ledum palustre, Potentilla erecta, Alchemilla vulgaris, Poterium, Malus sylvestris, Rubus, Dryas octopetala, Fragaria, Filipendula, Helianthemum, Aruncus and Sanguisorba minor. Larvae can be found from May to June.

== Environment ==
The moth prefers open areas such as grasslands, downs, and heaths. The species is most commonly found in the British Isles and Northern Europe.
