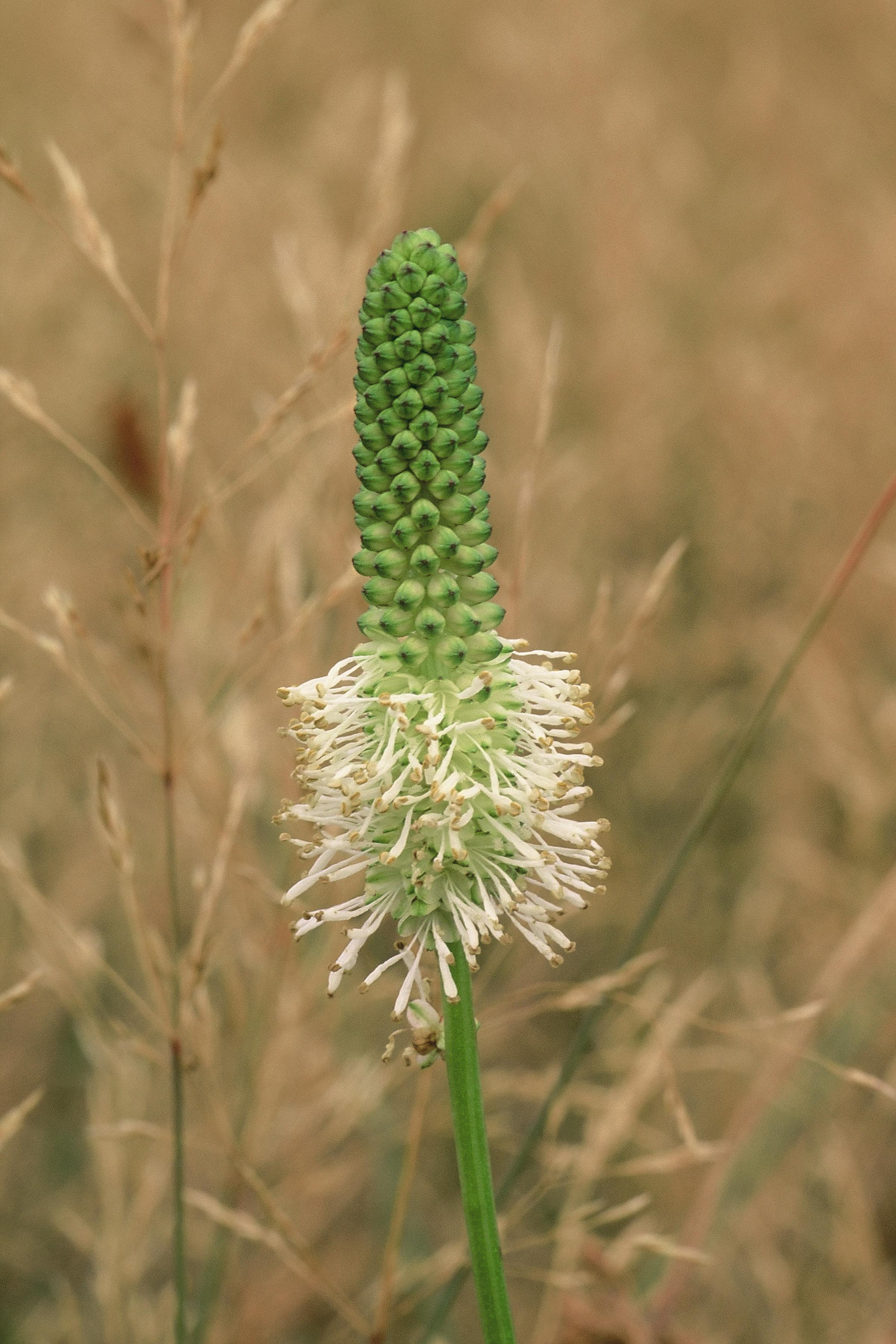
- Canadian burnet

Scientific classification
- Kingdom: Plantae
- Clade: Embryophytes
- Clade: Tracheophytes
- Clade: Angiosperms
- Clade: Eudicots
- Clade: Rosids
- Order: Rosales
- Family: Rosaceae
- Genus: Sanguisorba
- Species: S. canadensis

Binomial name
- Sanguisorba canadensis L.

= Sanguisorba canadensis =

Species of flowering plant in the rose family

Sanguisorba canadensis, the white burnet or Canadian burnet, is a species of flowering plant in the rose family Rosaceae, native to North America. This herbaceous perennial commonly grows in bogs, swamps, and roadsides from Labrador to Georgia. It grows four to five feet (1.2 to 1.5 m) tall, with creamy white flowers in cylindrical spikes, appearing from summer into autumn.

Unlike its close relatives, Sanguisorba officinalis (great burnet) and Sanguisorba minor (salad burnet), the leaves must be cooked to be eaten, in order to remove the bitterness.
