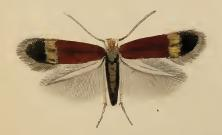

Scientific classification
- Kingdom: Animalia
- Phylum: Arthropoda
- Clade: Pancrustacea
- Class: Insecta
- Order: Lepidoptera
- Family: Nepticulidae
- Genus: Stigmella
- Species: S. poterii

Binomial name
- Stigmella poterii (Stainton, 1857)

Synonyms
- Nepticula poterii Stainton, 1857; Nepticula comari Wocke, 1862; Nepticula diffinis Wocke, 1874; Nepticula elisabethella Szocs, 1957; Nepticula geminella Frey, 1870; Nepticula occultella Heinemann, 1871; Nepticula palustrella Frey, 1870; Nepticula poteriella Doubleday, 1859; Nepticula serella Stainton, 1888; Nepticula tengstroemi Nolcken, 1871; Stigmella tengstroemi; Stigmella serella

= Stigmella poterii =

Species of moth

Stigmella poterii is a moth of the family Nepticulidae. It is found from Fennoscandia to the Pyrenees and Italy, and from Ireland to Ukraine.

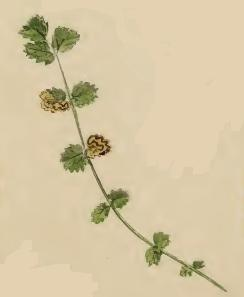
A leaf of Poterium sanguisorba with several mined leaflets

Larva

The wingspan is 3–5 millimetres (0.12–0.20 in).The thick erect hairs on the head vertex are ferruginous and the collar dark brown' The antennal eyecaps are whitish. The forewings are golden-bronze with a pale golden metallic slightly inwards-oblique fascia beyond middle. The apical area beyond this is dark purple-fuscous. The hindwings are grey.

Adults fly in June, then a second generation in August and September.

The larva is amber yellow in colour and has a brown-coloured head. It feeds on Filipendula ulmaria, Potentilla anserina, Potentilla erecta, Potentilla palustris, Potentilla tabernaemontani, Rubus arcticus, Rubus chamaemorus, Rubus saxatilis, Sanguisorba minor and Sanguisorba officinalis. They mine the leaves of their host plant.
