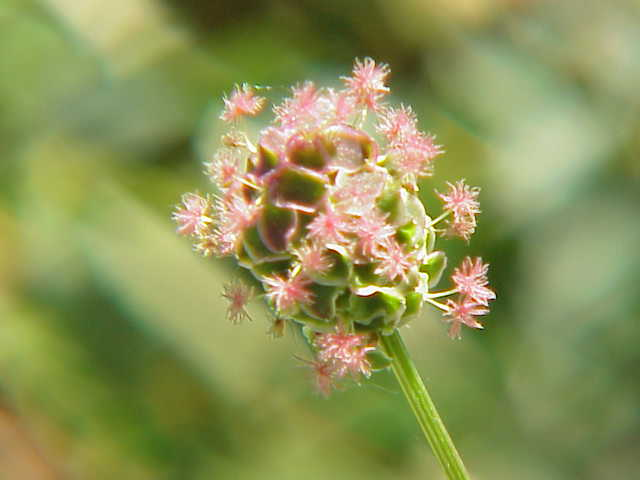
- Flower head of Sanguisorba minor

Scientific classification
- Kingdom: Plantae
- Clade: Embryophytes
- Clade: Tracheophytes
- Clade: Angiosperms
- Clade: Eudicots
- Clade: Rosids
- Order: Rosales
- Family: Rosaceae
- Subfamily: Rosoideae
- Tribe: Sanguisorbeae
- Subtribe: Sanguisorbinae
- Genus: Sanguisorba; L.

Species
- See text

Synonyms
- Dendriopoterium Svent.; Gervasia Raf., nom. nud.; Pimpinella Ség., nom. illeg.; Poteridium Spach; Poterium L.; Tobium Raf.

= Sanguisorba =

Genus of flowering plants in the rose family

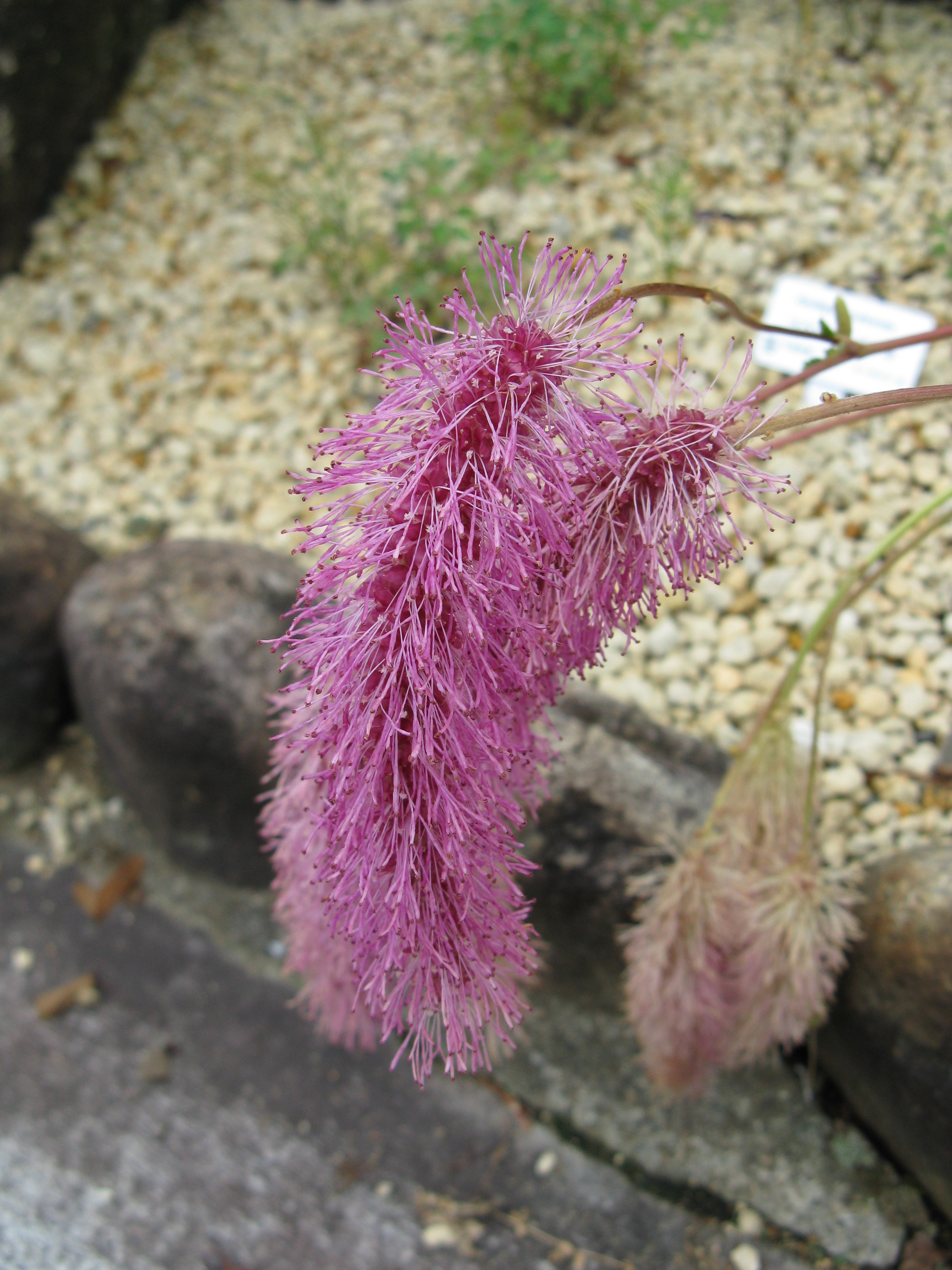
Sanguisorba hakusanensis

Sanguisorba is a genus of flowering plants in the family Rosaceae native to the temperate regions of the Northern Hemisphere. The common name is burnet.

== Description ==
The plants are herbaceous perennials or small shrubs. The stems grow to 50–200 cm (20–79 in) tall and have a cluster of basal leaves, with further leaves arranged alternately up the stem. The leaves are pinnate, 5–30 cm (2.0–11.8 in) long, with 7–25 leaflets, the leaflets with a serrated margin. Young leaves grow from the crown in the center of the plant. The flowers are small, produced in dense clusters 5–20 mm long; each flower has four very small petals, white to red in colour.

== Species ==
The following species are accepted:

- Sanguisorba albanica András. & Jáv.
- Sanguisorba albiflora (Makino) Makino
- Sanguisorba alpina Bunge
- Sanguisorba ancistroides (Desf.) Ces.
- Sanguisorba annua (Nutt. ex Hook.) Torr. & A.Gray – annual burnet, prairie burnet, western burnet
- Sanguisorba applanata T.T.Yu & C.L.Li
- Sanguisorba armena Boiss.
- Sanguisorba azovtsevii Krasnob. & Pshenich.
- Sanguisorba canadensis L. – Canadian burnet, white burnet
- Sanguisorba cretica Hayek
- Sanguisorba diandra (Hook.f.) Nordborg
- Sanguisorba dodecandra Moretti – Italian burnet
- Sanguisorba durui Yild.
- Sanguisorba filiformis (Hook.f.) Hand.-Mazz.
- Sanguisorba hakusanensis Makino
- Sanguisorba hybrida (L.) Font Quer
- Sanguisorba indica (Gardner) Tirveng.
- Sanguisorba japonensis (Makino) Kudô
- Sanguisorba × kishinamii Honda
- Sanguisorba lateriflora (Coss.) A.Braun & C.D.Bouché
- Sanguisorba longifolia Bertol.
- Sanguisorba magnifica I.Schischk. & Kom.
- Sanguisorba mauritanica Desf.
- Sanguisorba megacarpa (Lowe) Muñoz Garm. & C.Navarro
- Sanguisorba menendezii (Svent.) Nordborg – Canary Islands burnet
- Sanguisorba menziesii Rydb.
- Sanguisorba minor Scop. – salad burnet, garden burnet, little burnet
- Sanguisorba obtusa Maxim. – Japanese burnet
- Sanguisorba occidentalis Nutt.
- Sanguisorba officinalis L. – great burnet, burnet bloodwort
- Sanguisorba × poroshirensis S.Watan.
- Sanguisorba × pseudo-officinalis Naruh.
- Sanguisorba riparia Juz.
- Sanguisorba rupicola (Boiss. & Reut.) A.Braun & C.D.Bouché
- Sanguisorba sirnakia Yild.
- Sanguisorba stipulata Raf.
- Sanguisorba × takahashihideoi Naruh.
- Sanguisorba tenuifolia Fisch. ex Link
- Sanguisorba verrucosa (Link ex G.Don) Ces.

== Ecology ==
Sanguisorba minor is a food plant for the larvae of the grizzled skipper (Pyrgus malvae) and the mouse moth (Amphipyra tragopoginis). The caterpillars of both the scarce and dusky large blue feed on Sanguisorba officinalis.

== Cultivation and uses ==
Burnets are cultivated as garden plants. Many cultivars have been bred, especially from S. officinalis. S. canadensis is grown for its white flowers on stems that well exceed a meter tall. The plants hybridize easily, producing new mixes. S. obtusa is valued for its foliage of pink-edged, gray-green leaves.

Sanguisorba officinalis is used in traditional Chinese medicinal to treat gastrointestinal conditions and bleeding.

Sanguisorba minor, salad burnet, has similarly been used medicinally in Europe to control bleeding. The leaves have a cucumber flavour and can be eaten in salads, or used fresh or dried and made into a tea.

== Etymology ==
The Latin genus name Sanguisorba means 'blood stauncher'. 'Sanguis' is a cognate with 'sanguine', meaning 'blood'. 'Sorbeo' means 'to staunch'. The plant is known to have styptic properties.
