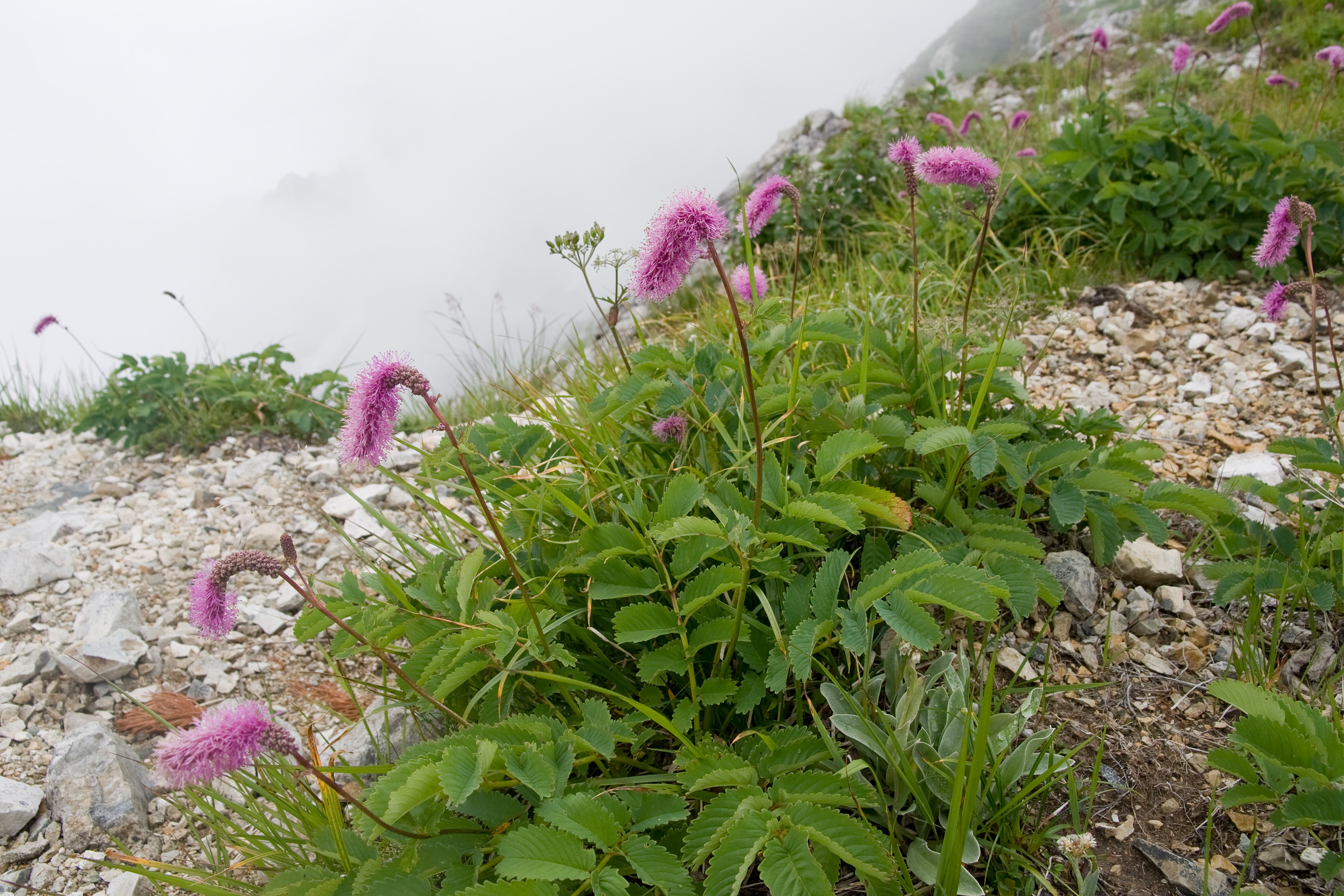

Scientific classification
- Kingdom: Plantae
- Clade: Embryophytes
- Clade: Tracheophytes
- Clade: Angiosperms
- Clade: Eudicots
- Clade: Rosids
- Order: Rosales
- Family: Rosaceae
- Genus: Sanguisorba
- Species: S. hakusanensis

Binomial name
- Sanguisorba hakusanensis Makino

Synonyms
- Heterotypic Synonyms: Sanguisorba amoena (Jesson) Koidz.; Sanguisorba hakusanensis f. coreana (H.Hara) M.Kim; Sanguisorba hakusanensis var. coreana H.Hara; Sanguisorba obtusa var. amoena Jesson

= Sanguisorba hakusanensis =

Species of flowering plant in the rose family

Sanguisorba hakusanensis, the Japanese burnet, is a species of flowering plant in the family Rosaceae, native to Japan, and Korea.

The plant was first described in 1907 by Tomitaro Makino. Its botanical epithet means "coming from Hakusan", a mountain in Japan.

== Description ==
This perennial grows on mountain ridges or in sunny rock crevices or grasslands near them. The stem grows to heights of 40–80 cm (16–31 in) and has few hairs. The leaves are opposite. The basal leaves are pinnate with 4–6 pairs of leaflets. The stem leaves are smaller and often have hairs on the lower underside. The reddish purple flowers bloom in August–September, and hang iat the ends of branches in spike inflorescences . The fruit is a squarish berry. The number of stamens is 6–12.

== Distribution ==
It is native to both Korea and Japan. In South Korea it is found on the mountains Jirisan and Gayasan (Gyeongsangnam-do), and Mudeungsan (Jeollanam-do), Deogyusan (Jeollabuk-do), and Seoraksan (Gangwon-do).

== Uses ==
In South Korea, the young leaves are eaten, while the roots are used medicinally.

== Cultivation ==
It is attractive in the garden for its long-lasting pink or lavender, fuzzy, arching plumes, as well as its gray-green, heavily scalloped leaves. It grows to about 20–30 in (51–76 cm) tall when in flower, and prefers full sun to partial shade in moist, well-drained soil.

Known cultivars include Sanguisorba hakusanensis 'Lilac Squirrel' (also known as Sanguisorba 'Lilac Squirrel',) it blooms from July to September.

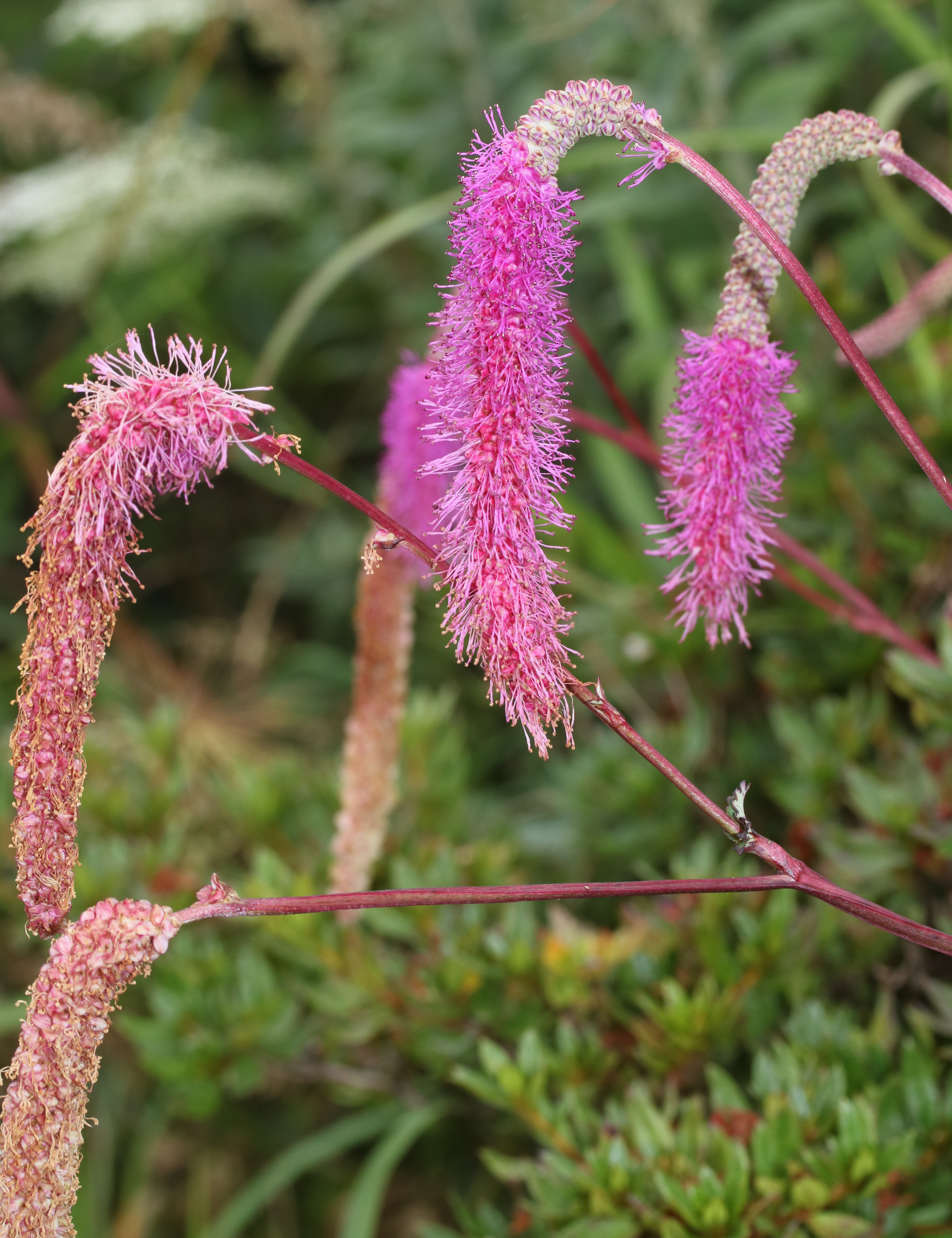

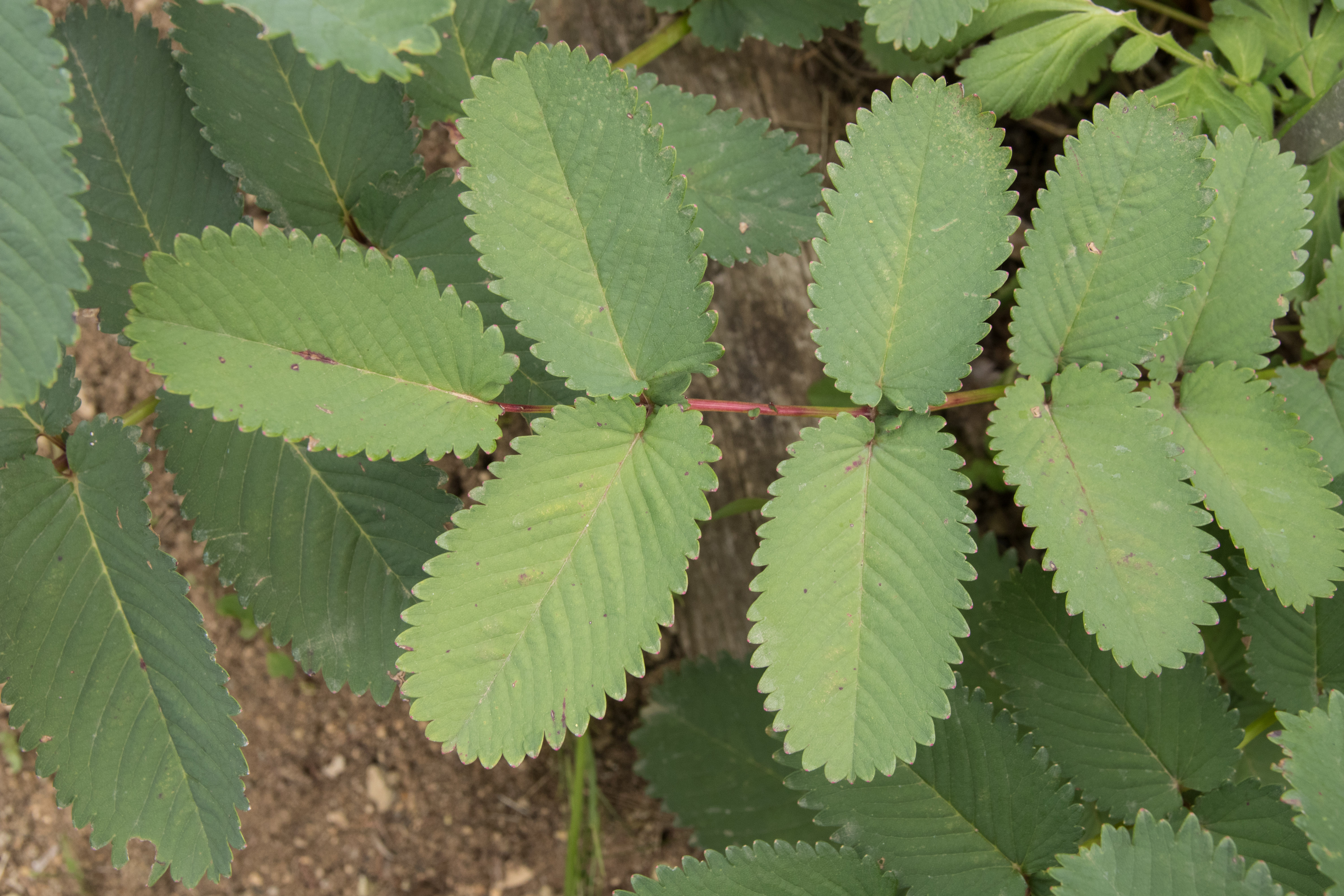

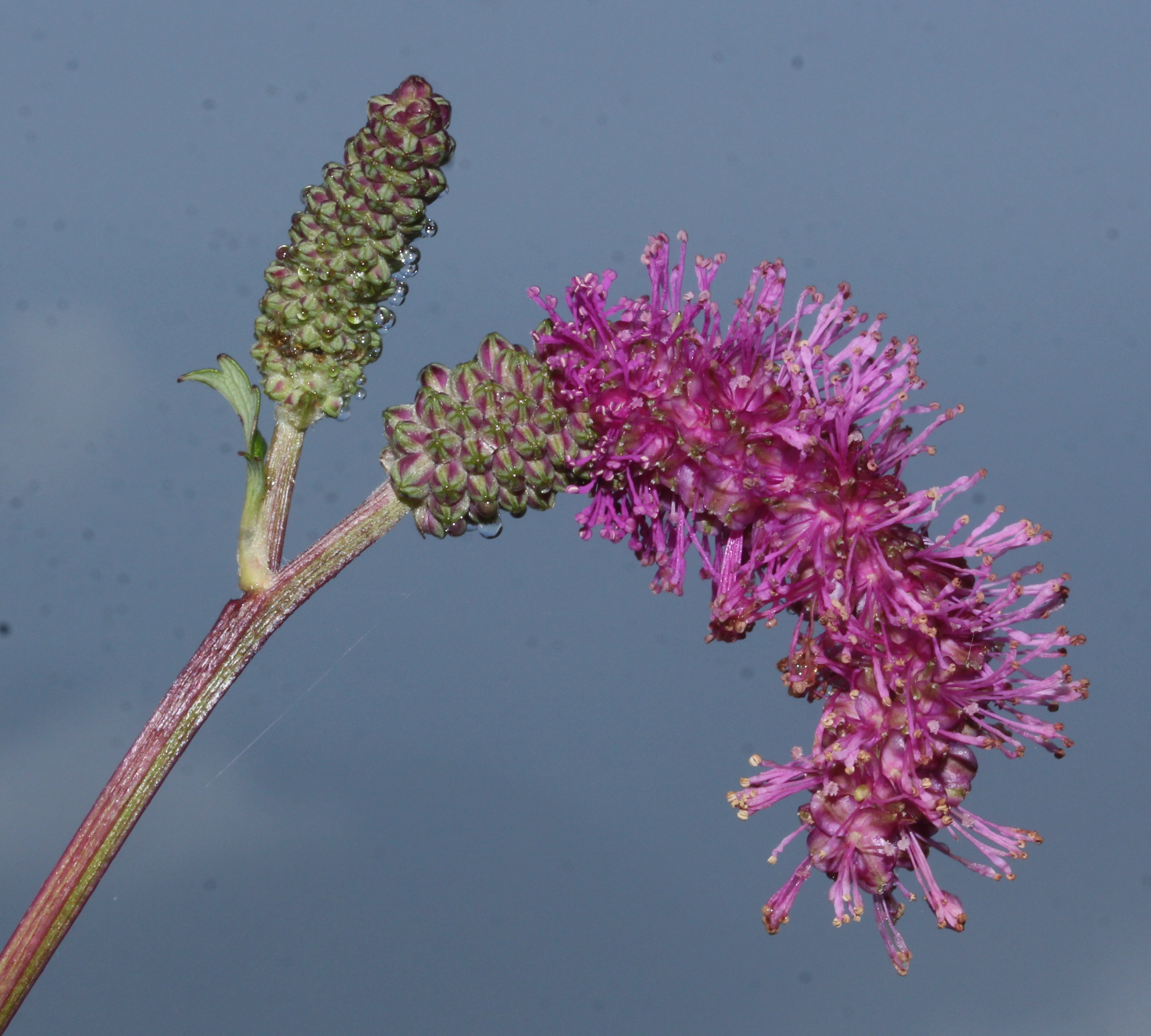
