= Bergsträsser =

Bergsträsser is a surname. Notable people with the surname include:

- Johann Andreas Benignus Bergsträsser (1732–1812), German educator, philologist, and entomologist
- Gotthelf Bergsträsser (1886–1933), German linguist
- Ludwig Bergsträsser (1883–1960), German politician
