= Bohostice =

- Municipality
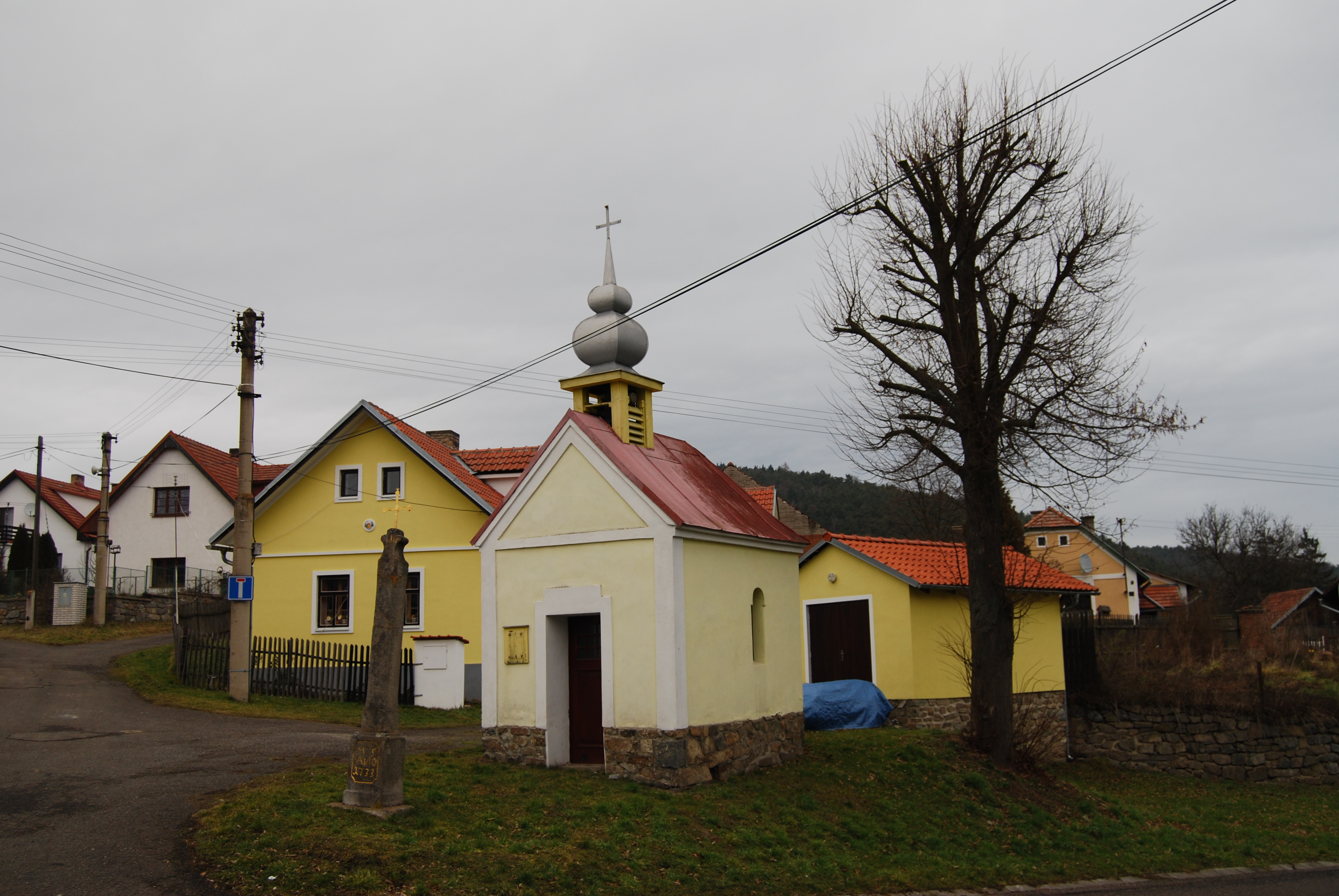
- Centre of Bohostice

- Flag Coat of arms

- Location in the Czech Republic
- Coordinates: 49°36′8″N 14°8′17″E
- Country: Czech Republic
- Region: Central Bohemian
- District: Příbram
- First mentioned: 1386

Area
  - Total: 20.90 km^{2} (8.07 sq mi)
- Elevation: 417 m (1,368 ft)

Population (2026-01-01)
  - Total: 211
  - Density: 10.1/km^{2} (26.1/sq mi)
- Time zone: UTC+1 (CET)
  - Summer (DST): UTC+2 (CEST)
- Postal code: 262 31
- Website: www.bohostice.cz

Bohostice is a municipality and village in Příbram District in the Central Bohemian Region of the Czech Republic. It has about 200 inhabitants.

== Administrative division ==
Bohostice consists of two municipal parts (in brackets population according to the 2021 census):

- Bohostice (195)
- Kamenná (14)

== Etymology ==
The origin of the name is uncertain. The initial name of the village was probably Bohumstice and was derived from the personal Bohumest, meaning "the village of Bohumest's people".

== Geography ==
Bohostice is located about 13 kilometres (8 mi) southeast of Příbram and 49 km (30 mi) south of Prague. It lies in the Benešov Uplands. The highest point is the hill Hřebeny at 544 m (1,785 ft) above sea level. The municipality is situated on the shore of the Orlík Reservoir, built on the Vltava River.

The stream Bohostický potok flows through the municipality. There is the Bohostice Nature Monument along the stream, protected due to the occurrence of the dusky large blue. It was declared in 2013.

== History ==
The first written mention of Bohostice is from 1386.

== Demographics ==
Historical population

Year	Pop.	±%
1869	1,014	—
1880	911	−10.2%
1890	846	−7.1%
1900	829	−2.0%
1910	728	−12.2%

Year	Pop.	±%
1921	648	−11.0%
1930	583	−10.0%
1950	366	−37.2%
1961	356	−2.7%
1970	305	−14.3%

Year	Pop.	±%
1980	256	−16.1%
1991	191	−25.4%
2001	194	+1.6%
2011	202	+4.1%
2021	209	+3.5%

Source: Censuses

== Transport ==
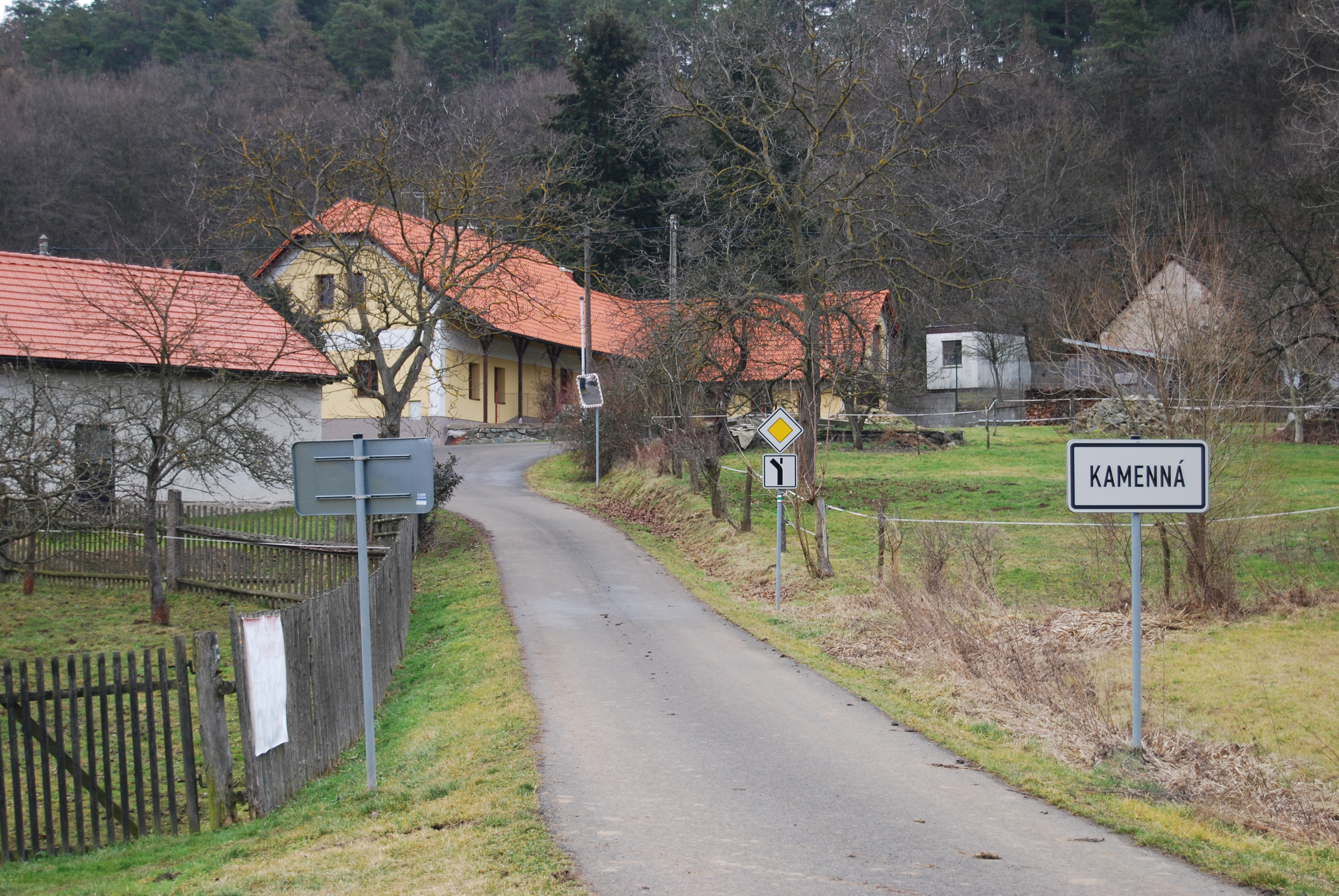
The village of Kamenná

There are no railways or major roads passing through the municipality.

== Sights ==
On the Chlumec hill is a Jewish cemetery. It is a well-preserved small village cemetery with valuable, mostly Neoclassical gravestones and several remarkable younger stelae of the traditional type from the mid-19th century.

The Bohostice Castle was built in the mid-18th century and, then it was rebuilt in the 19th century. Due to insensitive modifications in the 1980s, the monument protection of the building was cancelled.

The remains of the Church of St. Stephen from 1352 in the former village of Těchnice still stands below the reservoir surface. It was flooded during the construction of the dam in 1960.
