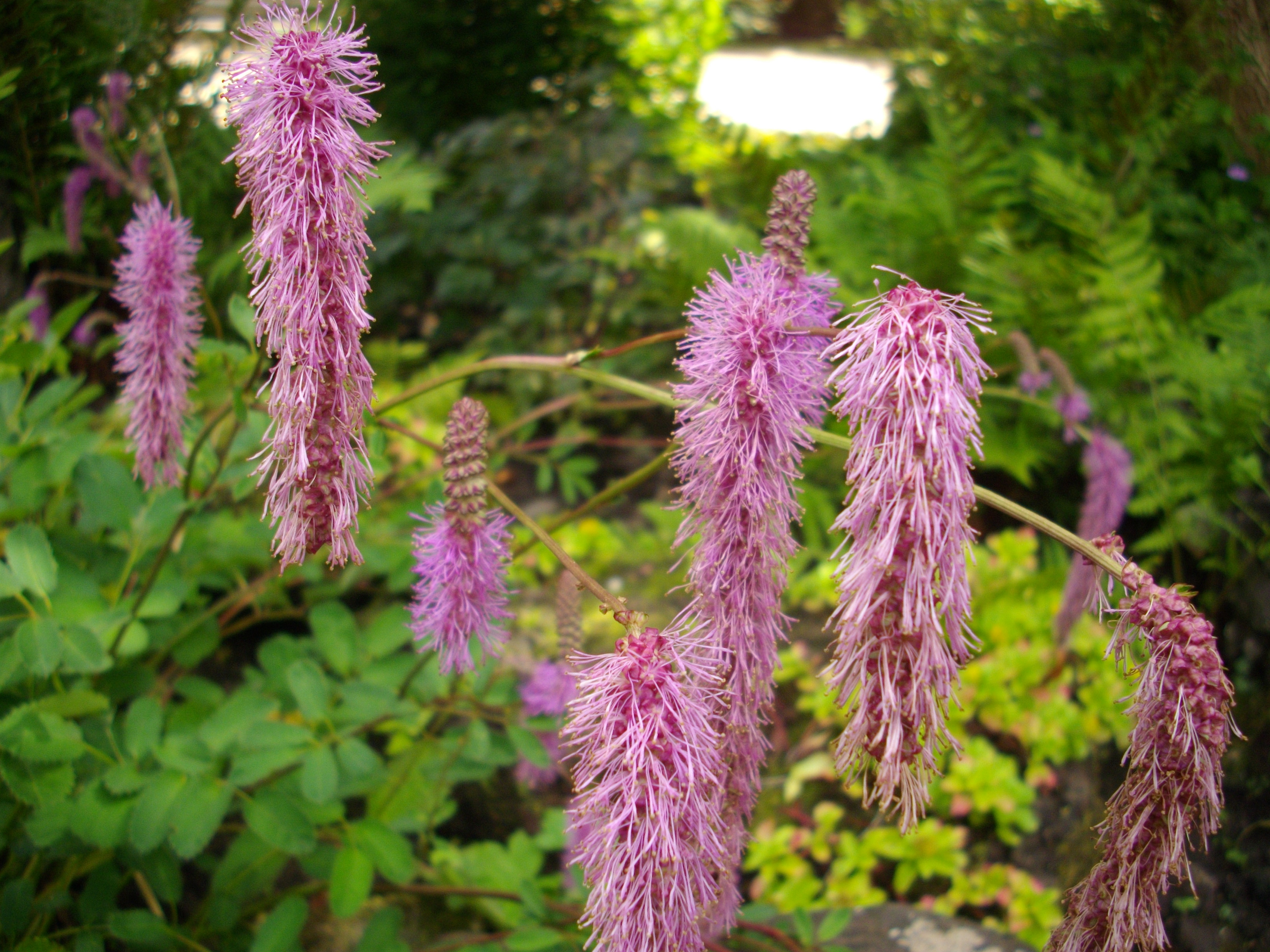

Scientific classification
- Kingdom: Plantae
- Clade: Tracheophytes
- Clade: Angiosperms
- Clade: Eudicots
- Clade: Rosids
- Order: Rosales
- Family: Rosaceae
- Genus: Sanguisorba
- Species: S. obtusa

Binomial name
- Sanguisorba obtusa Maxim.

= Sanguisorba obtusa =

Species of plant

Sanguisorba obtusa, the Nanbutouutisou(Japanese name.No English name), is a species of flowering plant in the family Rosaceae, native to Japan. (Honshu). Growing up to 1.5 m (4.9 ft) tall by 1 m (3.3 ft) broad, this rhizomatous herbaceous perennial has grey-green foliage, and attractive bright pink bottle-brush type flowers on wiry stems, in summer.

In cultivation it can tolerate a range of conditions in sun or partial shade, with moist soil.
