= Sanguisorba menziesii =

Conservation status
- Vulnerable (NatureServe)

Scientific classification
- Kingdom: Plantae
- Clade: Tracheophytes
- Clade: Angiosperms
- Clade: Eudicots
- Clade: Rosids
- Order: Rosales
- Family: Rosaceae
- Genus: Sanguisorba
- Species: S. menziesii

Binomial name
- Sanguisorba menziesii Rydb.

Species of flowering plant

Sanguisorba menziesiii, commonly known as Menzies' burnet, Sanguisorbe de Menzies, and small-head burnet, is a species of flowering plant in the family Rosaceae. It is a perennial or helophyte native to Alaska, British Columbia, and Washington in northwestern North America. It grows in coastal bogs and marshes from coastal southern Alaska through coastal British Columbia to the Olympic Peninsula of Washington (Grays Harbor and Clallam counties).

The species was first described by Per Axel Rydberg in 1908.
