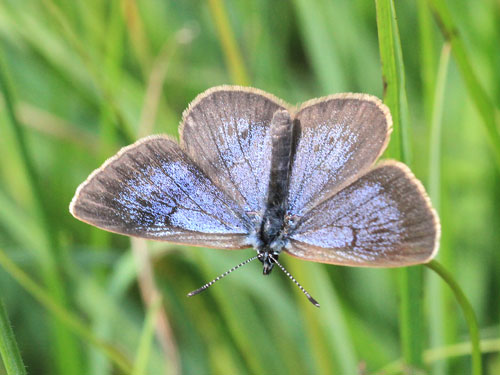

Conservation status
- Near Threatened (IUCN 2.3)

Scientific classification
- Kingdom: Animalia
- Phylum: Arthropoda
- Class: Insecta
- Order: Lepidoptera
- Family: Lycaenidae
- Genus: Phengaris
- Species: P. nausithous

Binomial name
- Phengaris nausithous (Bergsträsser, 1779)

Synonyms
- Glaucopsyche nausithous; Maculinea nausithous (Bergsträsser, 1779); Lycaena arcas Rott.

= Dusky large blue =

Species of butterfly

The dusky large blue (Phengaris nausithous) is a species of butterfly in the family Lycaenidae. It is found in Armenia, Austria, Azerbaijan, Belarus, Bulgaria, Czech Republic, France, Georgia, Germany, Hungary, Kazakhstan, Moldova, Montenegro, the Netherlands, Poland, Romania, Russia, Slovenia, Spain, Switzerland, and Ukraine.

The life cycle of this species is strongly related to the herbaceous plant Sanguisorba officinalis (great burnet).

== Description from Seitz ==
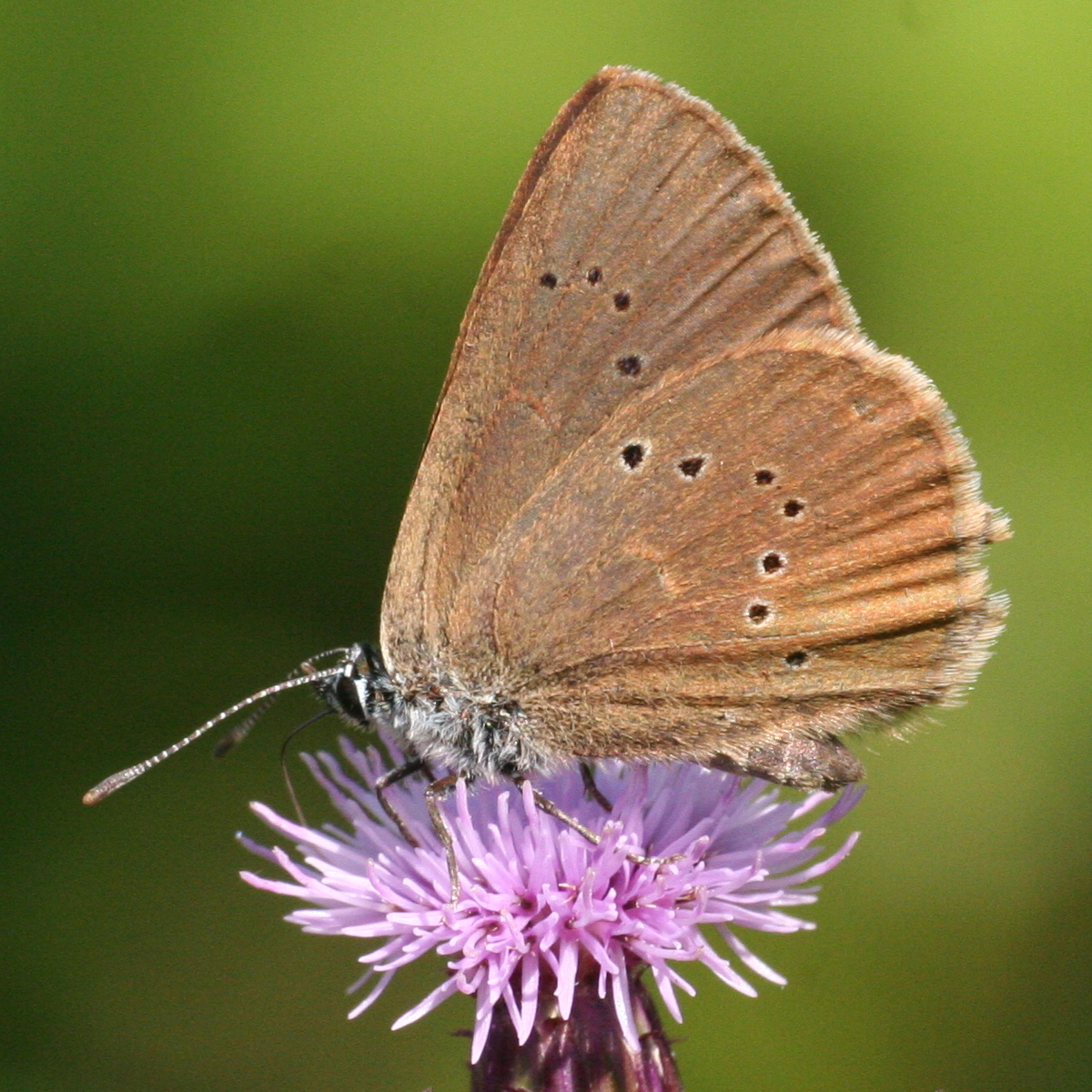
Ventral view

L. arcas Rott. (= erebus Knoch) (83 e). Male similar to euphemus, but the female quite black-brown above; particularly recognizable by the underside being coffee-brown and bearing only one row of ocelli, ab. minor Frey are small specimens from Switzerland. In ab. inocellata Sohn the ocelli of the underside are reduced, in ab. lycaonius Schultz they are entirely absent. In the male-ab. lucida Geest the forewing above has the blue lighter and more extended and the black discal spots reduced or obsolete. Throughout Central Europe, from Alsatia to the Ural, Caucasus and Armenia, and from Pommerania and the Lower Rhine to Italy. — Egg like that of euphemus laid on Sanguisorba. The young larva pale, later on purple-brown and finally probably yellowish-brown, at first at the flowers, later on at the leaves of Sanguisorba. The butterflies have exactly the same habits as euphemus, with which they frequently fly together, in July and August; they are usually still more plentiful than euphemus in the places where they occur (damp meadows).

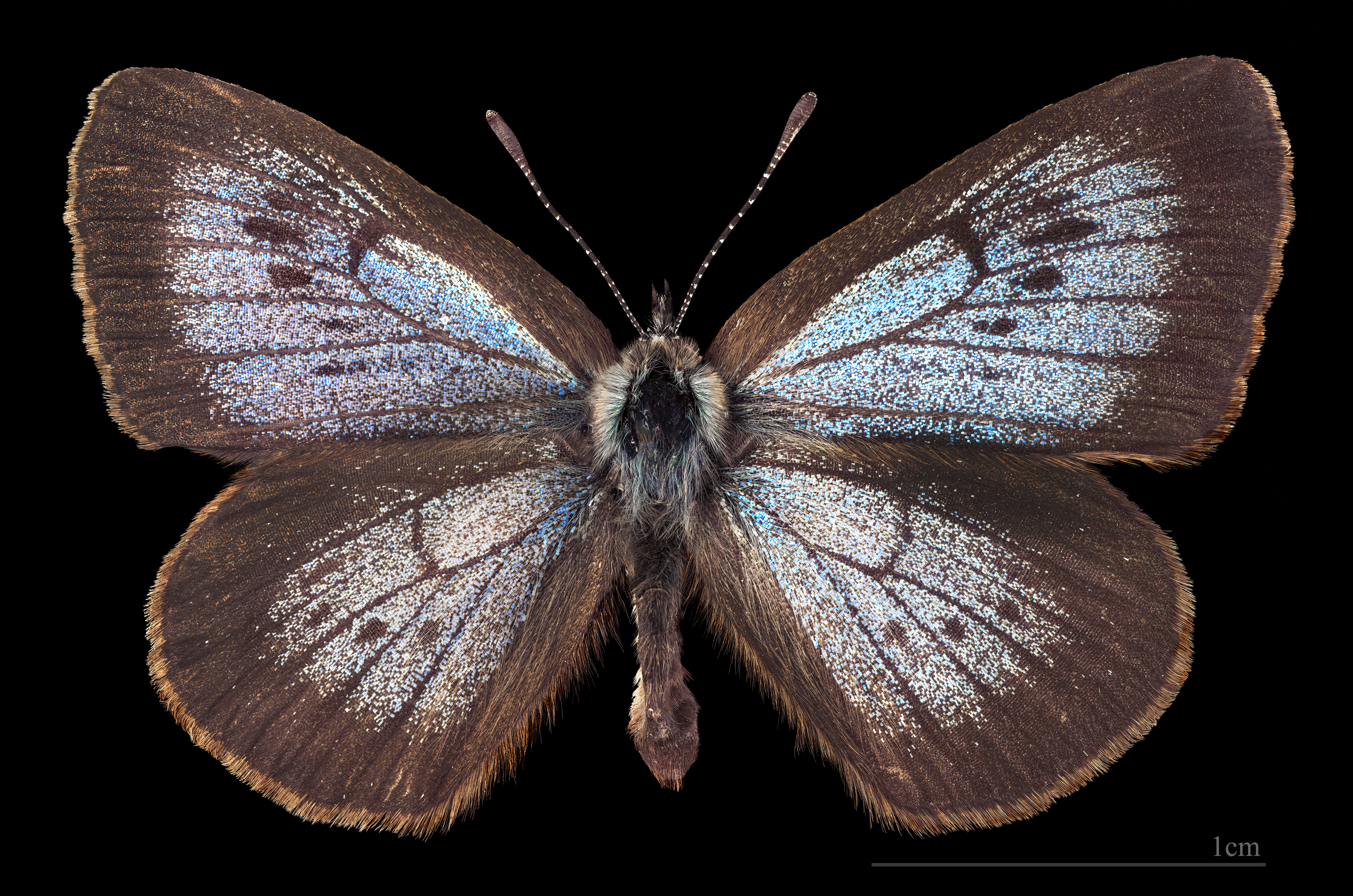
Phengaris nausithous ♂

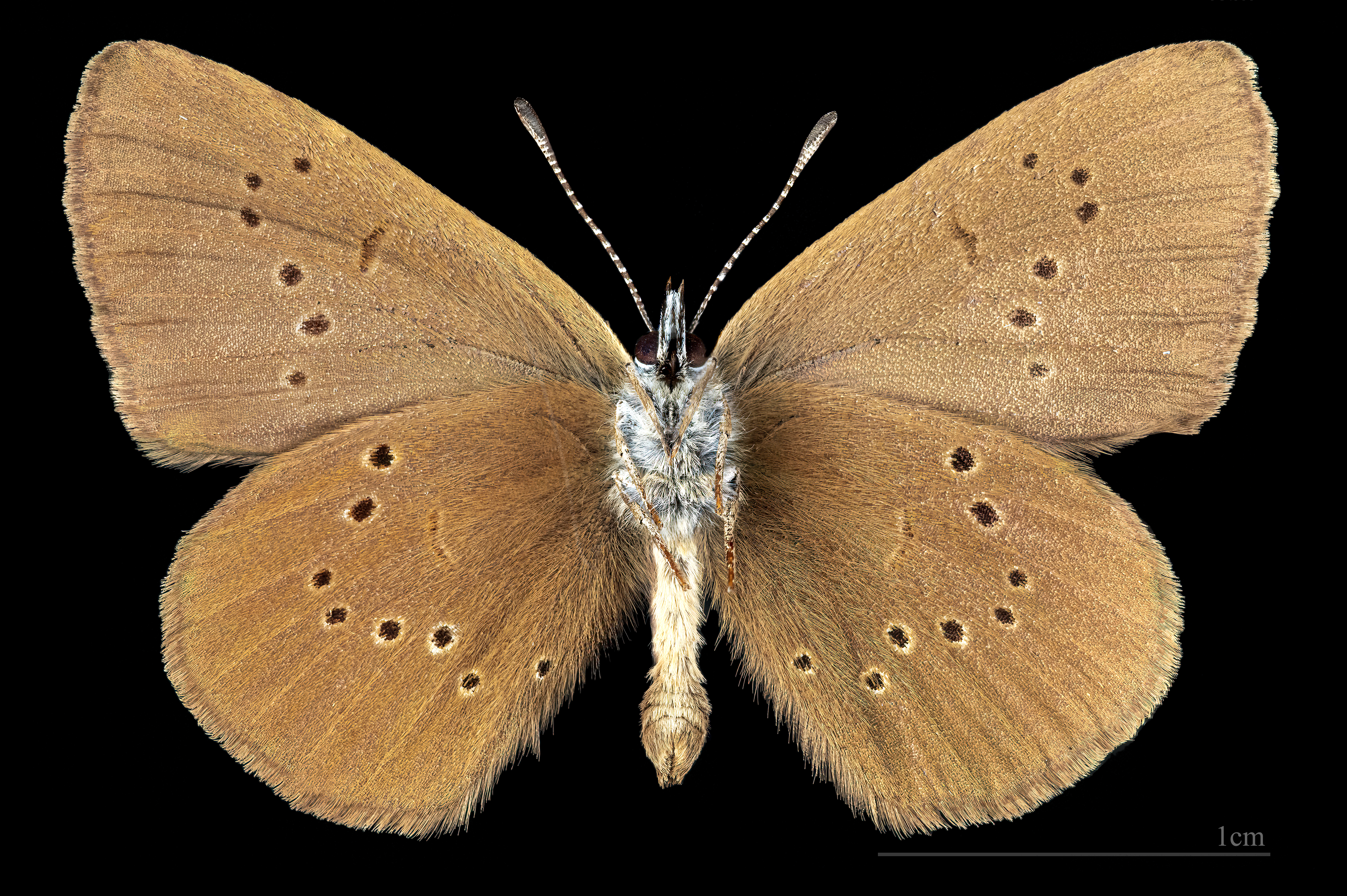
Phengaris nausithous ♂ △

== Similar species ==
- Scarce large blue Phengaris teleius
- Mountain Alcon blue Phengaris rebeli
- Alcon large blue Phengaris alcon
- Large blue Phengaris arion
