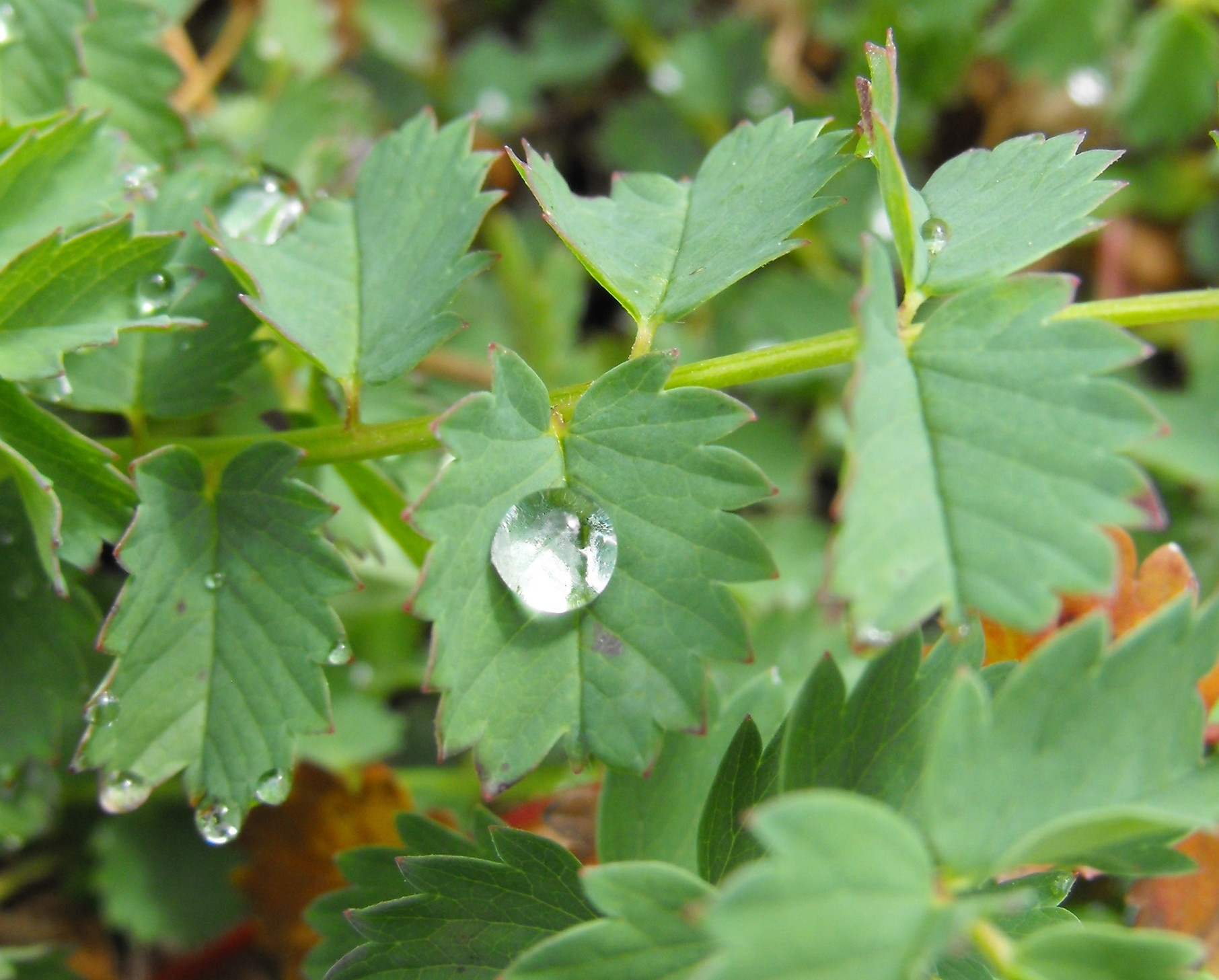

Scientific classification
- Kingdom: Plantae
- Clade: Embryophytes
- Clade: Tracheophytes
- Clade: Angiosperms
- Clade: Eudicots
- Clade: Rosids
- Order: Rosales
- Family: Rosaceae
- Genus: Sanguisorba
- Species: S. annua

Binomial name
- Sanguisorba annua (Nutt.) Nutt.

Synonyms
- Sanguisorba occidentalis

= Sanguisorba annua =

Species of flowering plant in the rose family

Sanguisorba annua is a species of flowering plant in the rose family known by the common names annual burnet and prairie burnet. It is native to North America, including many areas in western and central Canada and the United States. It can be found in several types of habitat, including grassland, sagebrush, and disturbed areas. It is an annual or biennial herb producing a leafy, mostly erect stem up to about 90 centimeters (35 in) in maximum height. The leaves are composed of several pairs of leaflets, each leaflet oval in shape and usually divided into lobes, sometimes deeply, the lobes becoming narrow, linear, or fingerlike. The inflorescence is a spikelike dense cluster of up to 50 flowers held erect on a tall, naked peduncle. The flower has four green sepals and no petals.
