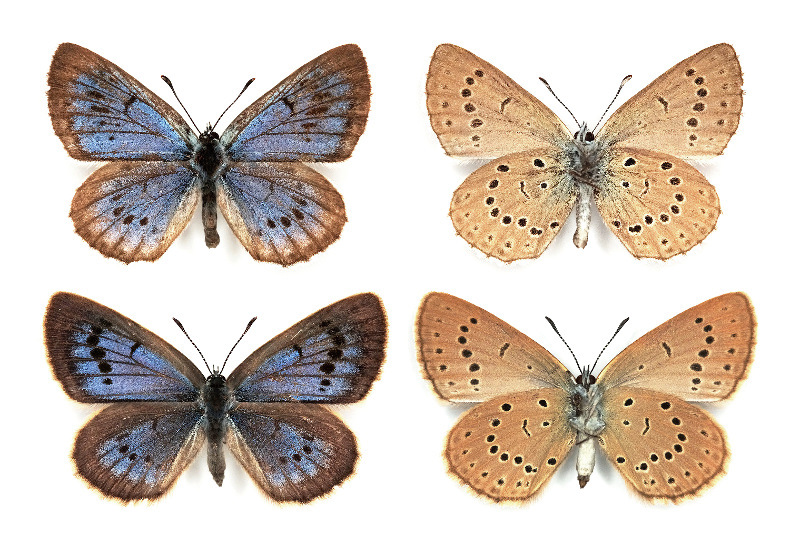

Conservation status
- Near Threatened (IUCN 2.3)

Scientific classification
- Kingdom: Animalia
- Phylum: Arthropoda
- Class: Insecta
- Order: Lepidoptera
- Family: Lycaenidae
- Genus: Phengaris
- Species: P. teleius

Binomial name
- Phengaris teleius (Bergsträsser, 1779)
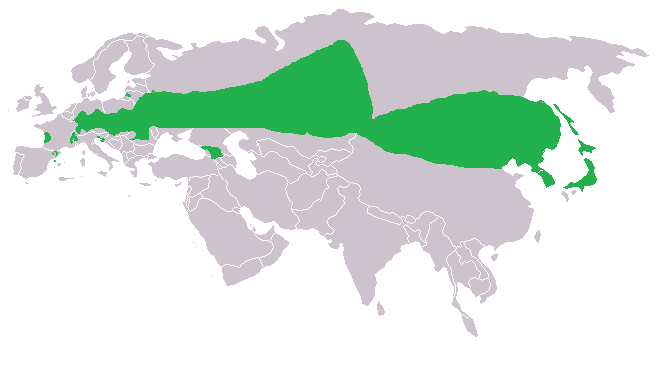
- Distribution map

Synonyms
- Glaucopsyche teleius; Maculinea teleius (Bergsträsser, 1779); Papilio teleius Bergsträsser, [1779]; Papilio diomedes Rottemburg, 1775 (preocc.); Papilio telegonus Bergsträsser, [1779]; Papilio arctophylas Bergsträsser, [1779]; Papilio arctophonus Bergsträsser, [1779]; Papilio euphemus Hübner, 1800; Lycaena obscurata Staudinger, 1887; Lycaena splendens Kohzantshikov, 1924; Maculinea teleius Verity, 1943: 144; Maculinea beleius [sic], D'Abrera, 1993; Phengaris teleius (Bergsträsser), Fric et al., 2007

= Scarce large blue =

Species of butterfly

The scarce large blue (Phengaris teleius) is a species of butterfly in the family Lycaenidae. It is found in Austria, Slovenia, Croatia, the Czech Republic, France, Georgia, Germany, Hungary, Italy, Japan, Kazakhstan, Mongolia, Poland, Romania, Russia, northern Serbia, Spain, Switzerland, and Ukraine and East across the Palearctic to Japan. The species was first described by Johann Andreas Benignus Bergsträsser in 1779.

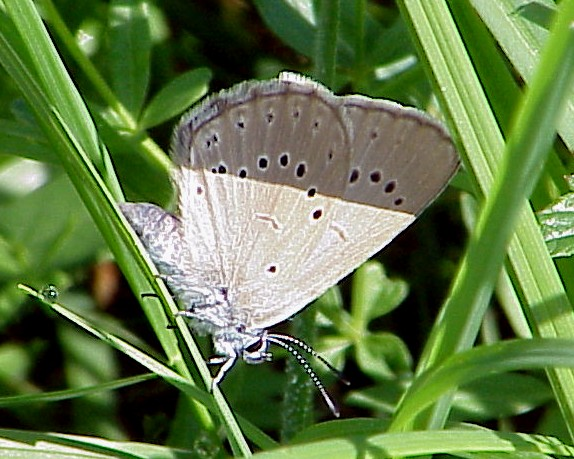

== Biology ==
The larva of this species first feeds on Sanguisorba officinalis (great burnet), then moves onto ant nests and is a predator of the ant brood. Myrmica rubra and Myrmica scabrinodis have been reported as frequent host ant species. A recent microhabitat preference study indicates that grazing is necessary for maintaining the present distribution and abundance of these butterflies.

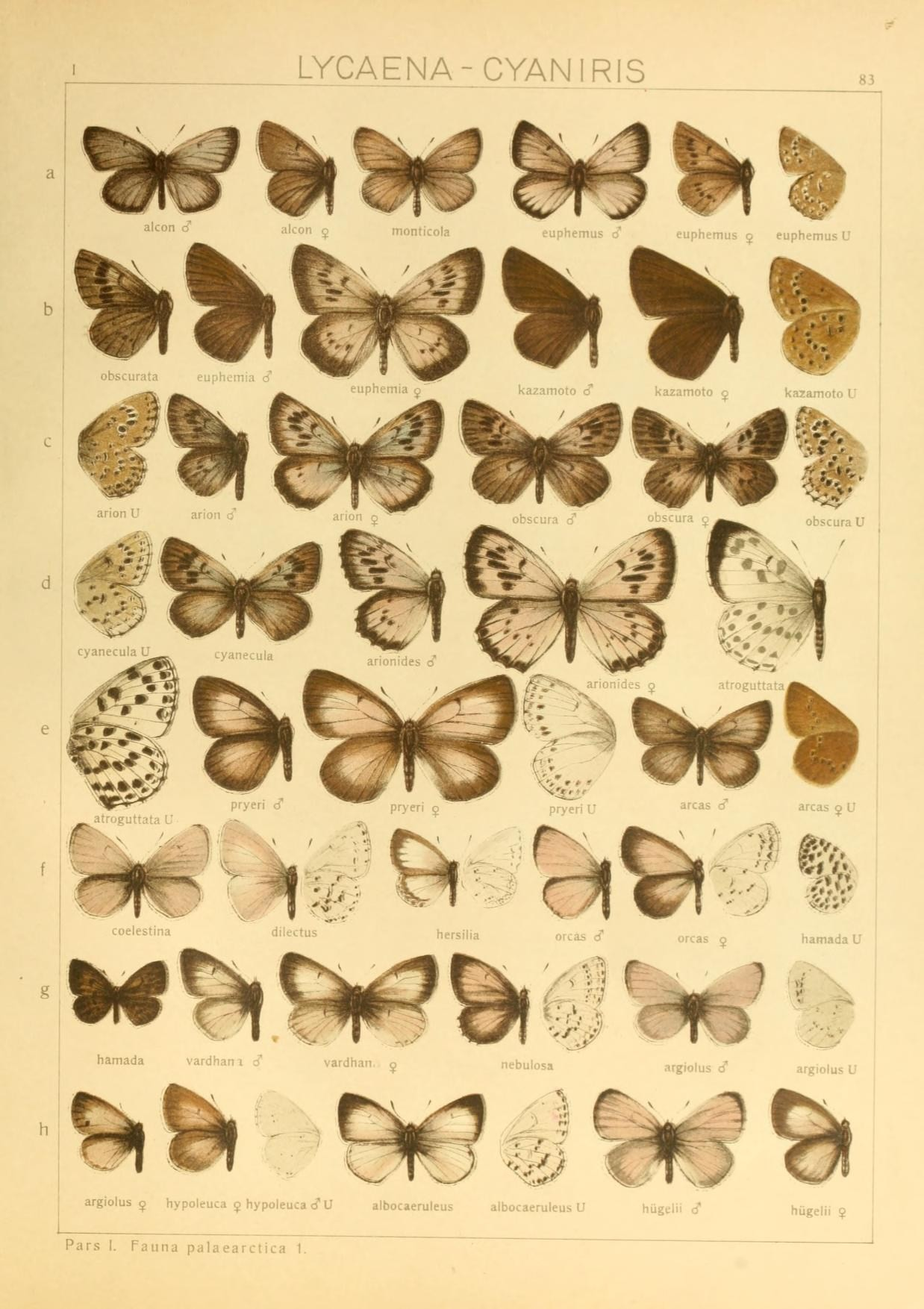
Seitz 83a

== Description from Seitz ==
L. euphemus Hbn. (= diomedes Rott.) (83 a), Male above almost entirely blue, but not shining; the margins, the discocellular spot of the forewing and commonly some small spots on the disc black; female much blacker, often a little paler on the disc, this lighter area bearing rows of black spots. Underside with very numerous ocelli, which are rarely as large and conspicuous as in our figure of the underside. The species is at once distinguished from the very similar arion by the underside not bearing an ocellus in the cell proximally to the discocellular spot. Throughout Europe (with the exception of England) and the adjacent districts of Asia, from North Germany and Russia to Italy, and from Paris to Dauria. — Near the North- Western boundary there occur especially small individuals (of the size of icarus), which have but few ocelli; these are ab. paula Schultz. In ab. obsoleta Gillm. the ocelli of the hindwing are entirely absent or almost, while in ab. striata Gillm. they are modified into streaks. — obscurata Stgr. (83 b) is a strongly darkened form from Central Asia (also already in the Ural) — euphemia Stgr. (83 b) is much larger than European specimens, with a broad block border which sharply contrasts with the light blue; from Amurland. North China and Corea. — kazamoto Druce [now species Phengaris kazamoto (H. Druce, 1875) ](83 b), from Japan, is above uniformly black-brown above in both sexes, without any trace of blue, and the underside is more strongly ocellate. — Egg semiglobular with the top sunk in, greenish white, laid on Sanguisorba (usually on the inflorescence). The young larva purplish brown with black head and pale segmental incisions; it bores into the heads of the plant and lives later on in the seed-pods; it hibernates. Pupa on the ground, under stones, clods of earth, and the dead leaves of the food-plant. The butterflies are sporadic, their localities being widely dispersed. They fly in damp meadows where Sanguisorba grows, being here usually very abundant. They settle almost exclusively on Sanguisorba: when disturbed they fly mostly only as far as the nearest cluster of that plant, where they settle on a flower with the wings always closed, their flight being rather slow and flapping. In July and August.

== Subspecies ==
There are six subspecies.

- P. t. teleius central Europe, Caucasus and western Siberia
- P. t. chosensis (Matsumura, 1927) southern Ussuri
- P. t. euphemia (Staudinger, 1887) Amur Oblast, Ussuri
- P. t. obscurata (Staudinger, 1892) Transbaikalia
- P. t. sinalcon Murayama, 1992 northern China
- P. t. splendens (Kozhantshikov, 1924) Altai Mountains, Sayan Mountains

== Bibliography ==
- Koren, Toni; Lauš, Boris; Šašić, Martina; Mihoci, Iva; Štih, Ana; Bralić, Petra; Gomboc, Stanislav (2017-12-31). "Contribution to the Knowledge of the Butterfly Fauna (Lepidoptera: Papilionoidea) of Hrvatsko Zagorje, Croatia". Natura Croatica: Periodicum Musei Historiae Naturalis Croatici. 26 (2): 167–196. doi:10.20302/NC.2017.26.15. eISSN 1848-7386.
- Data related to Maculinea teleius at Wikispecies
- Media related to Maculinea teleius at Wikimedia Commons
