= Gayasan (South Chungcheong) =

Mountain in western South Korea

Highest point
- Elevation: 678 m (2,224 ft)

Geography
- Location: South Chungcheong Province, South Korea

Gayasan (Korean: 가야산) is a mountain of South Chungcheong Province, western South Korea. It has an elevation of 678 metres.

== See also ==
- List of mountains of Korea
