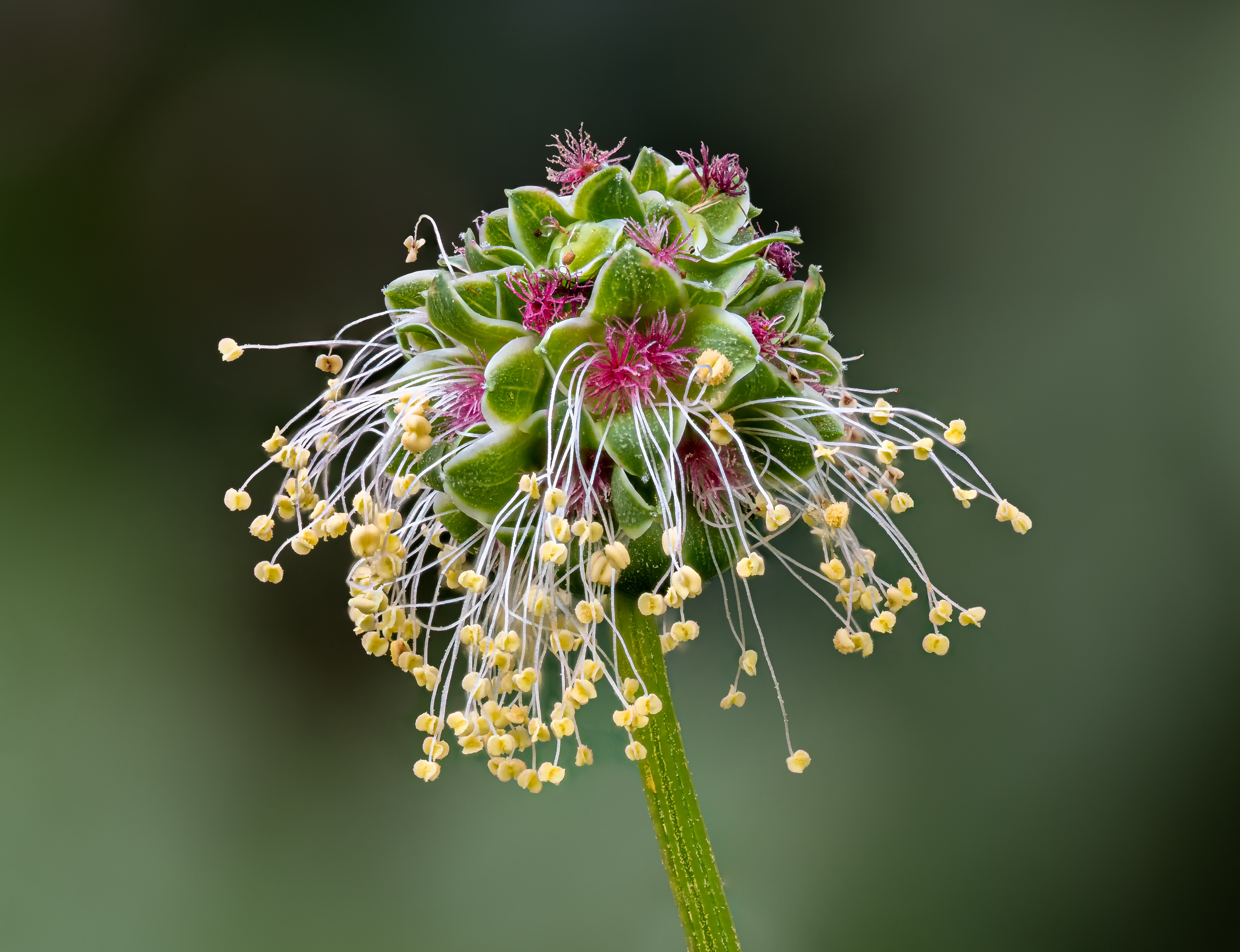
- Male flower

Scientific classification
- Kingdom: Plantae
- Clade: Tracheophytes
- Clade: Angiosperms
- Clade: Eudicots
- Clade: Rosids
- Order: Rosales
- Family: Rosaceae
- Genus: Sanguisorba
- Species: S. minor

Binomial name
- Sanguisorba minor Scop.

Synonyms
- Poterium sanguisorba, Pimpinella minor, Poterium minus. For heterotypic synonyms, see Sanguisorba minor subsp. minor

= Sanguisorba minor =

Species of flowering plant in the rose family

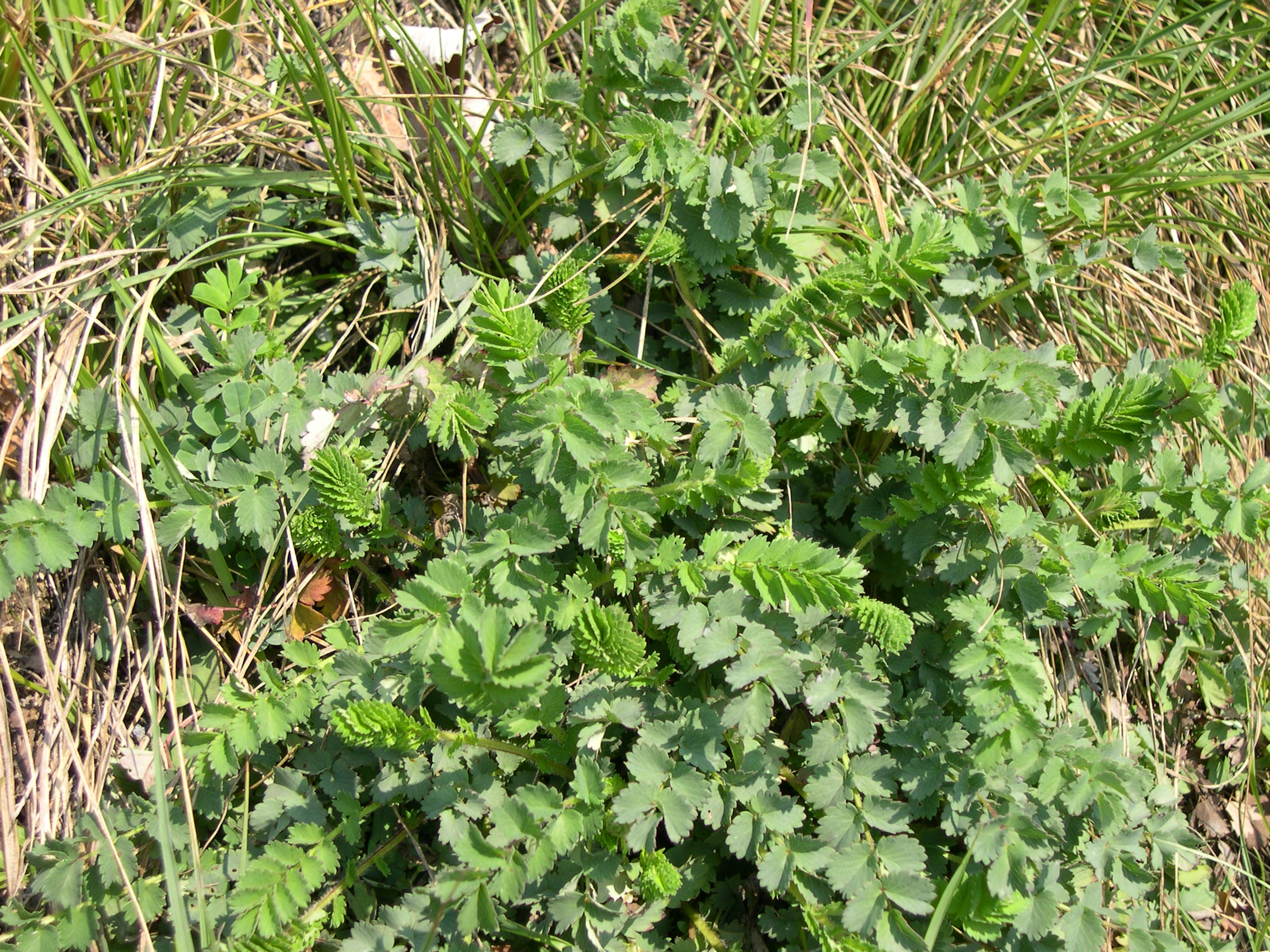
Leaves, used in salads

Sanguisorba minor, the salad burnet, garden burnet, small burnet, burnet (also used for Sanguisorba generally), pimpernelle, (Note: French pronunciation: [pɛ̃.pʁə.nɛl]) Toper's plant, and burnet-bloodwort, is an edible perennial herbaceous plant in the family Rosaceae. It has ferny, toothed-leaf foliage; the unusual crimson, spherical flower clusters rise well above the leaves on thin stems. It generally grows to 25–55 cm (9.8–21.7 in) tall (moisture-dependent; as short as 2 cm in dry areas). The large, long (sometimes 1m/3-foot), taproots store water, making it drought-tolerant.

It is evergreen to semi-evergreen; in warmer climates grows all year around, and in cold climates it stays green until heavy snow cover occurs. Plants may live over 20 years, though 7–12 is more usual; it lives longer if sometimes permitted to set seed. Burnet flowers in early summer.

Subspecies include muricata, minor, and mongolii (the last from the Mediterranean).

== Occurrence ==
Salad burnet is native to western, central and southern Europe; northwest Africa, southwest Western Asia and Siberia. In Britain, it is not native, but has been naturalized since the 16th century. It has also naturalized in most of North America, in South America, Australia, and New Zealand. It is not generally invasive, co-existing with other plants and increasing species diversity. As of 2008 it had been reported as invasive in just one place, a pasture in Wyoming. The variables controlling salad burnet spread in North America are poorly studied.

In Europe it is found only in calcerous soils (see limestone), and is most common on chalk soils (see chalk) in England. In France, it grows on alluvial meadows, and in the south of France, on Kermes oak maquis (a Quercus coccifera shrubland ecosystem with siliceous soil) and garrigue (a shrubland ecosystem with calcareous soil). In Spain, it grows on silaceous soils.

In North America the species is probably much less diverse, due to founder effects and heavy selective breeding for forage value, including selection for cold-tolerance. It grows in a variety of soil types, generally infertile, well-drained soils, including weakly saline and weakly alkaline or acidic soils. In North America, it grows at a broad range of elevations. It is cold- and frost-tolerant, growing in USDA hardiness zones 4a-8a, but does not grow well in shade. It grows well on slopes and disturbed soil, and is sometimes used to stabilize soil. The delar cultivar widely grown in North America does not grow in damp or flooding areas, and needs over 14 inches (36 cm) of precipitation per year.

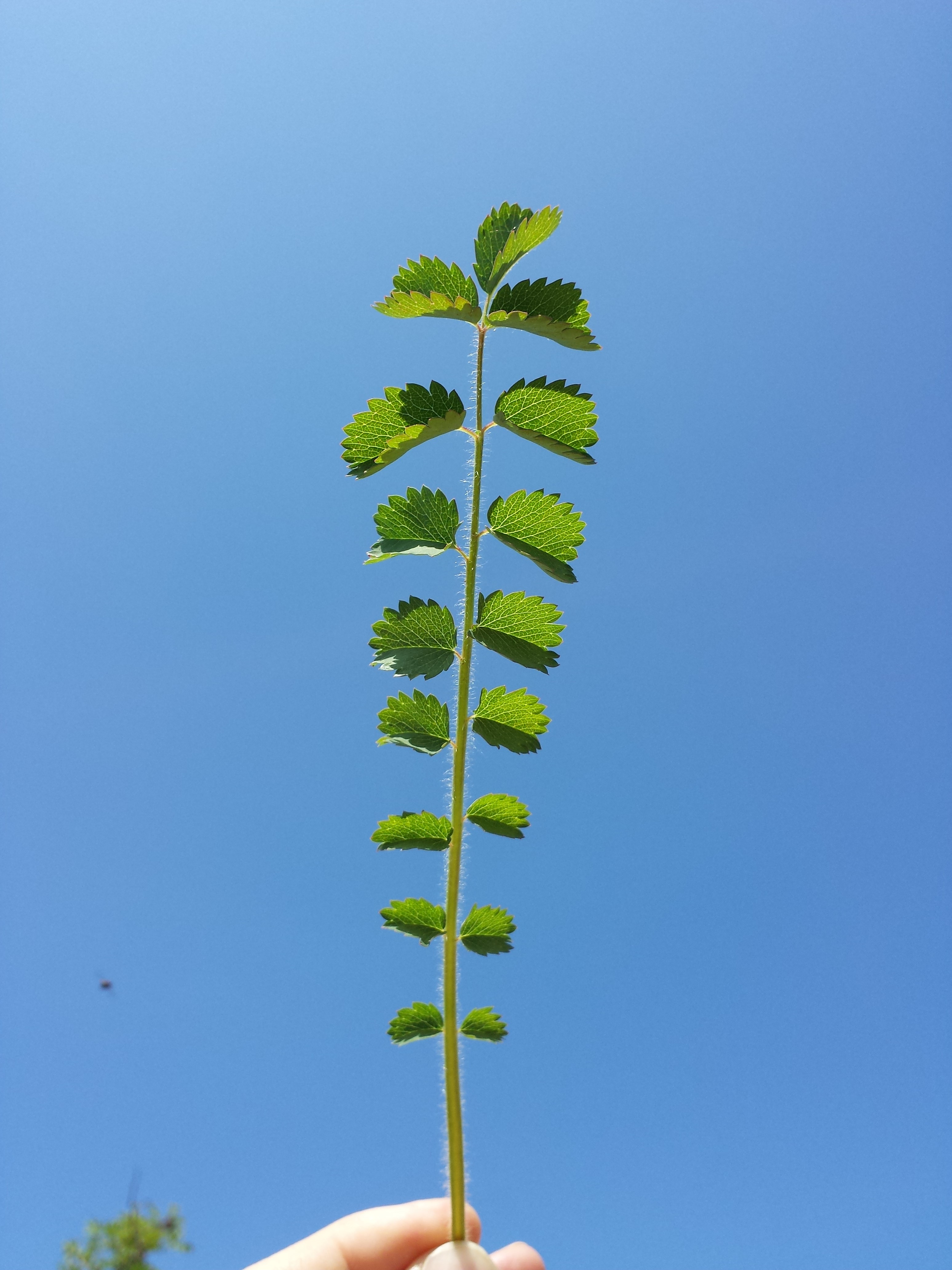
Alternating leaves

=== Cultivation ===
It is grown in containers, wildflower meadows, ornamental gardens, and kitchen gardens, usually in sunny or very slightly shady spaces with an equator-facing or west-facing aspect. In North America, it is grown on dry rangelands. It is used for grazing, erosion control, post-fire weed control, firebreaks, and landscape rehabilitation. Because it tends to stay green, it is considered fire-resistant.

=== Propagation ===
Salad burnet can carry both male and female flowers on the same plant; that is, it is monoecious.

Salad burnet generally does not flower or seed in its first year of life. Grazing can prevent flowering, and hooved animals, rabbits, hares, rodents, and grasshoppers may eat almost all of the seed in some areas, but plants can also sprout from rodents' seed caches. The seeds are surrounded by a winged hypanthium until they germinate; the reason for the wings is unknown. Apart from being carried by animals, they might be dispersed by wind and water, which might account for the wings. In the wild, seeds survive in soil for decades, and despite the soil moisture, which tends to rot them, about half will still sprout; this is the natural gemination rate in Europe. Salad burnet can spread fairly quickly by self-seeding. It can also be spread by division, and it can spread through rhizomes, but young plants are easy to pull up, thought they develop taproots fairly rapidly.

Seed is mature when hard and dark; commercially, it is harvested with a high combine harvester to selectively take the seed while leaving the herbage. Yield is 500–550 pounds per acre (560–620 kg/ha) when irrigated, about a third that in drier conditions. commercial seed remains viable for several years if stored cool at 12 to 15 percent moisture, and seed in a warehouse has shown no appreciable drop in viability after 25 years of storage. Germination rates actually increase over three years of storage, and commercial seed usually has over 90% field germination rates, but both seed yields and germination rates are probably elevated in domestic species due to artificial selection. North American wild rates are not known. Salad burnet establishes slowly, and so it is not grazed (nor expected to flower much) for the first year.

In the wild, seed is buried an average of 10 cm or 4 inches deep. In a greenhouse experiment, germination peaked when seeds were set 6 cm (2.5 inch) deep.

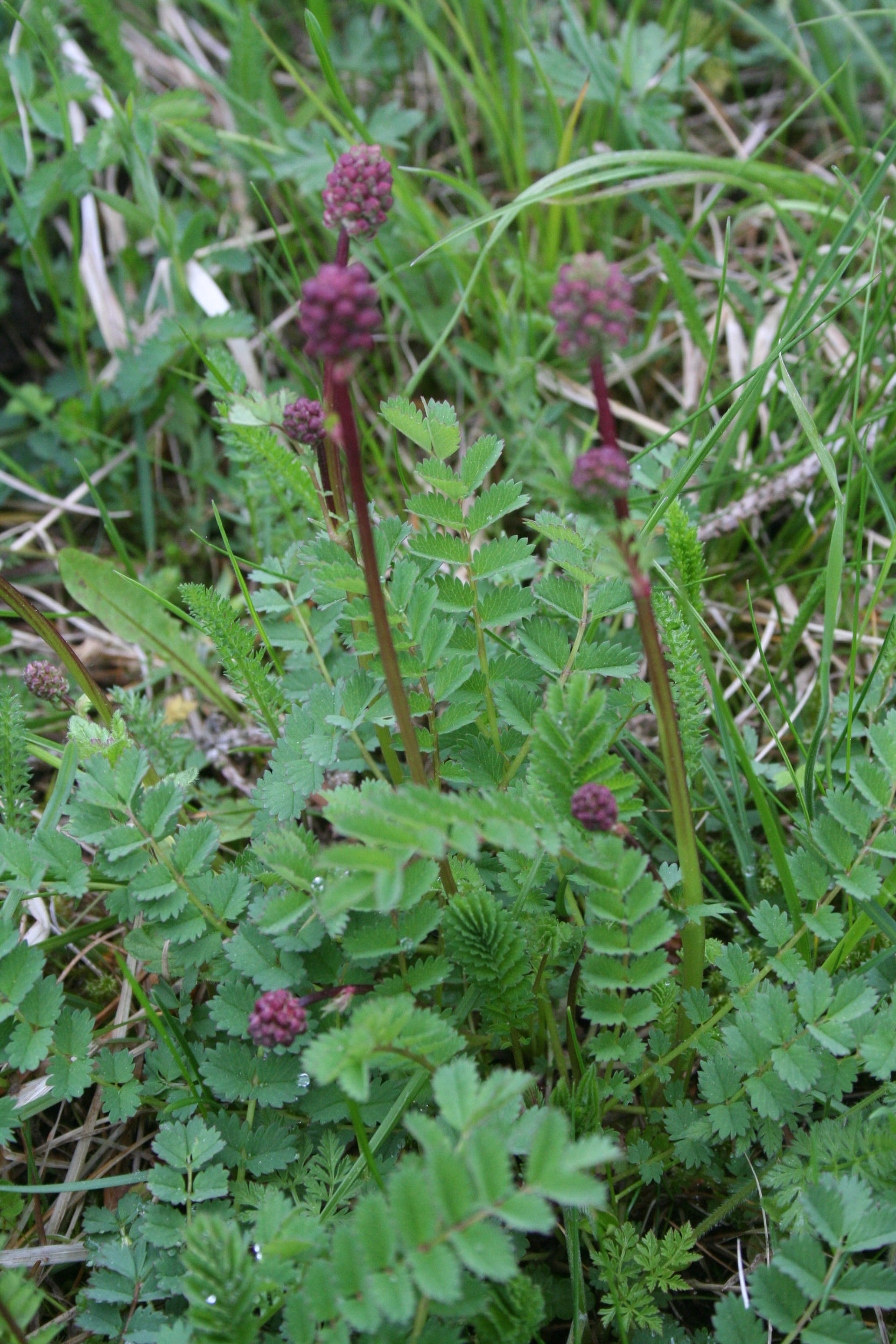
Flowerbuds can easily be grazed off. Doubs, France.

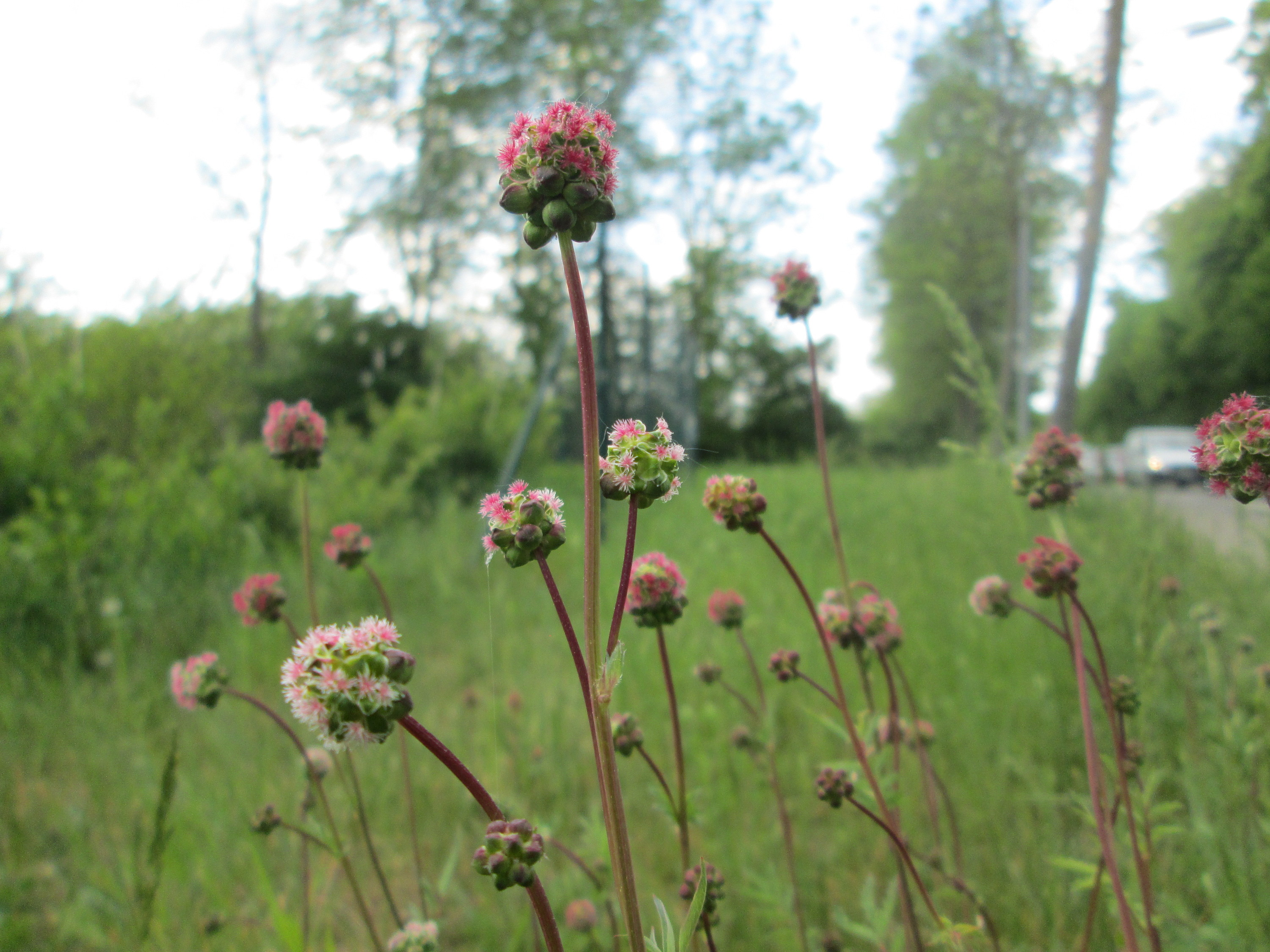
Female flowers, Brebach-Fechingen, outside Saarbrücken, Germany

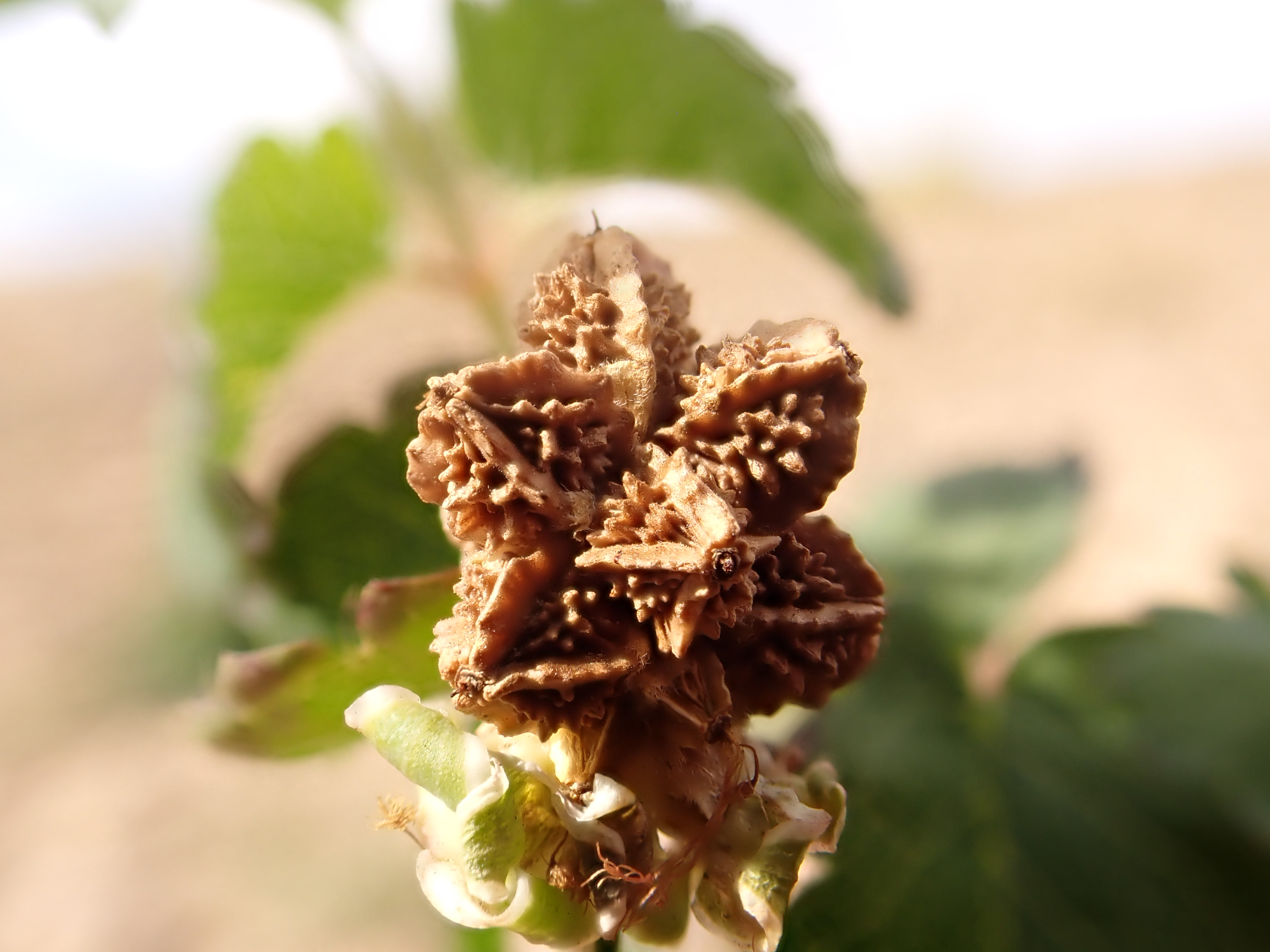
Seedhead on plant, Montana, US

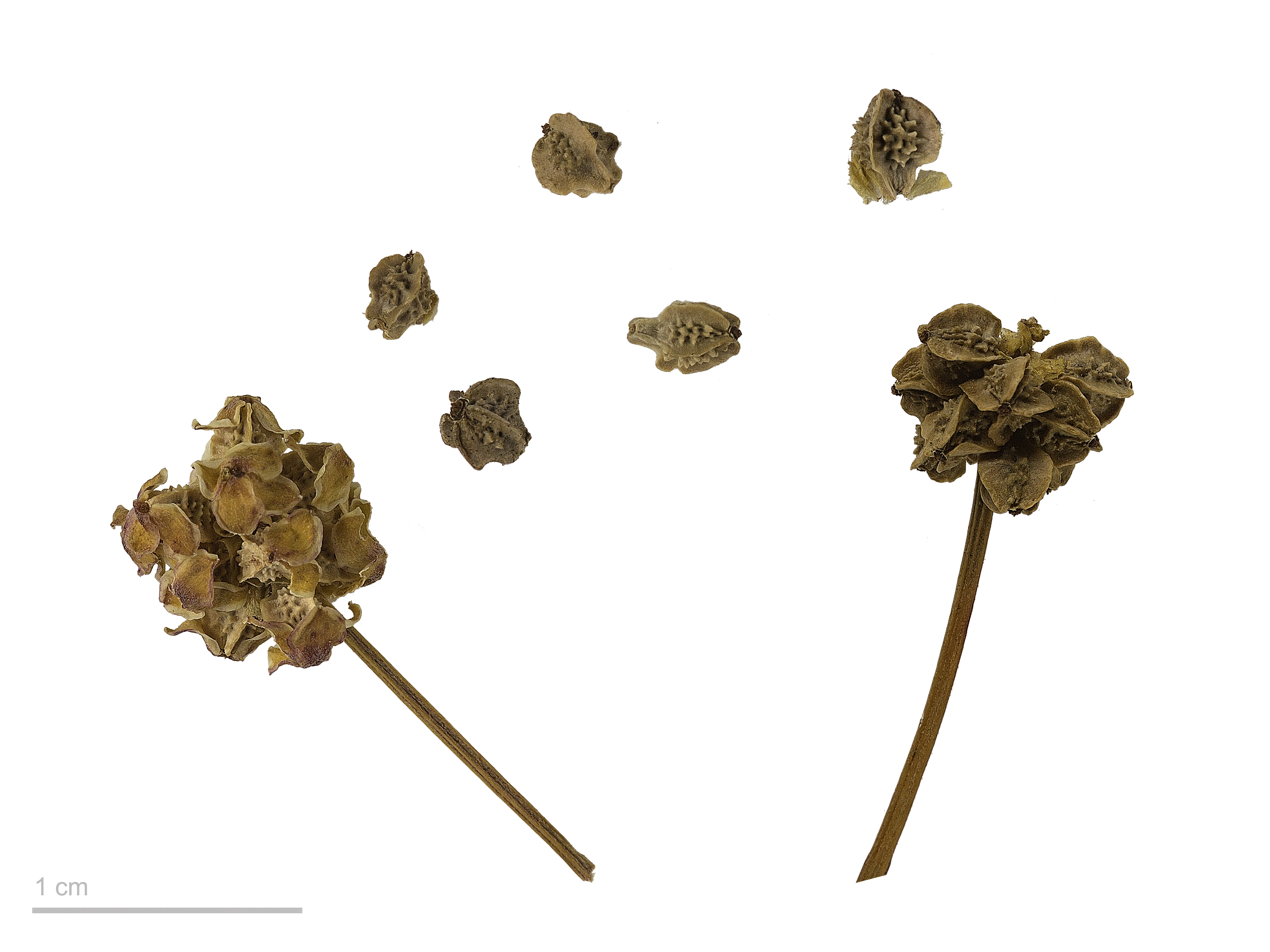
Seeds and seedheads, Toulouse, France

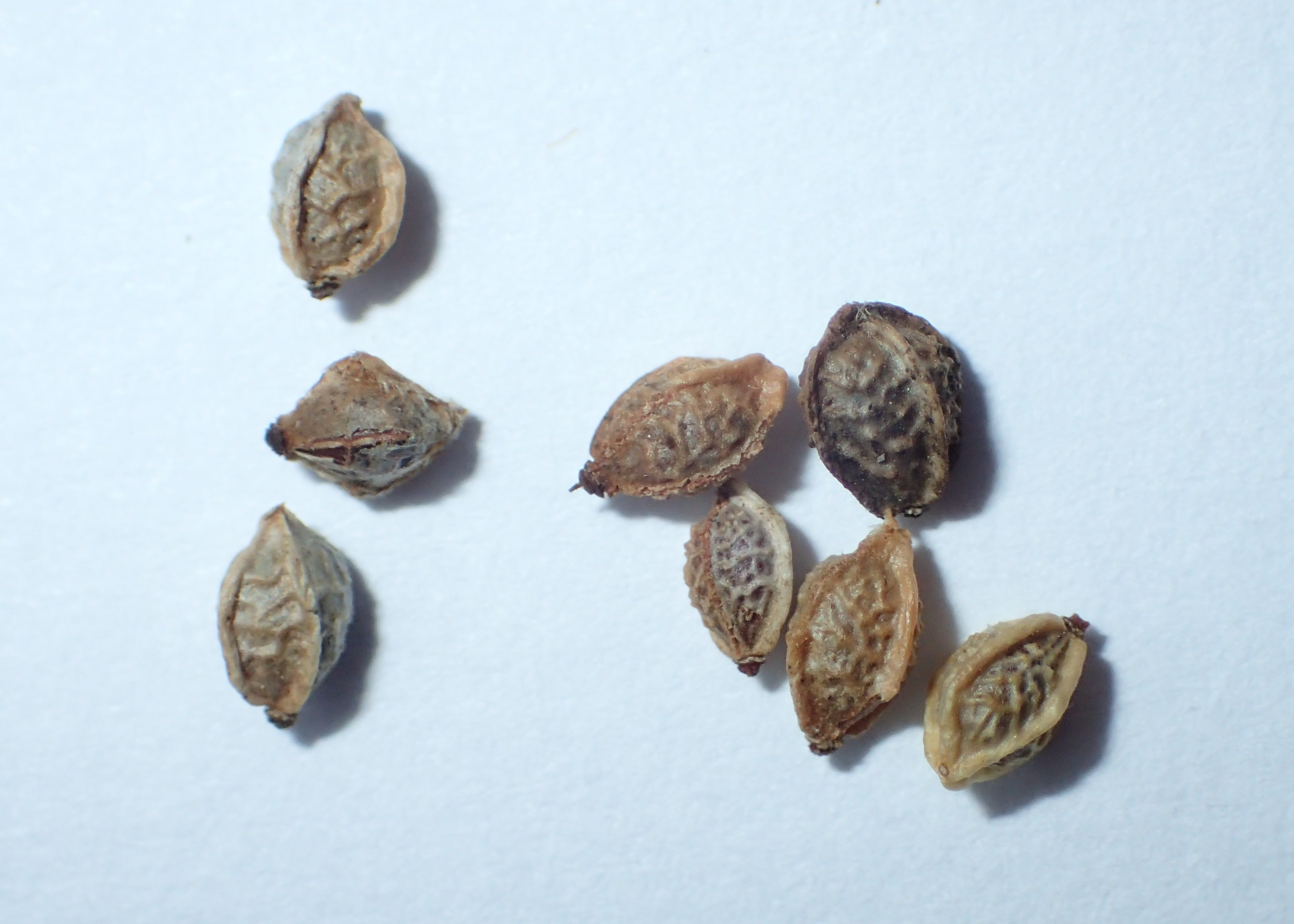
Small-winged seeds, Poland

== Usage ==
=== Culinary ===
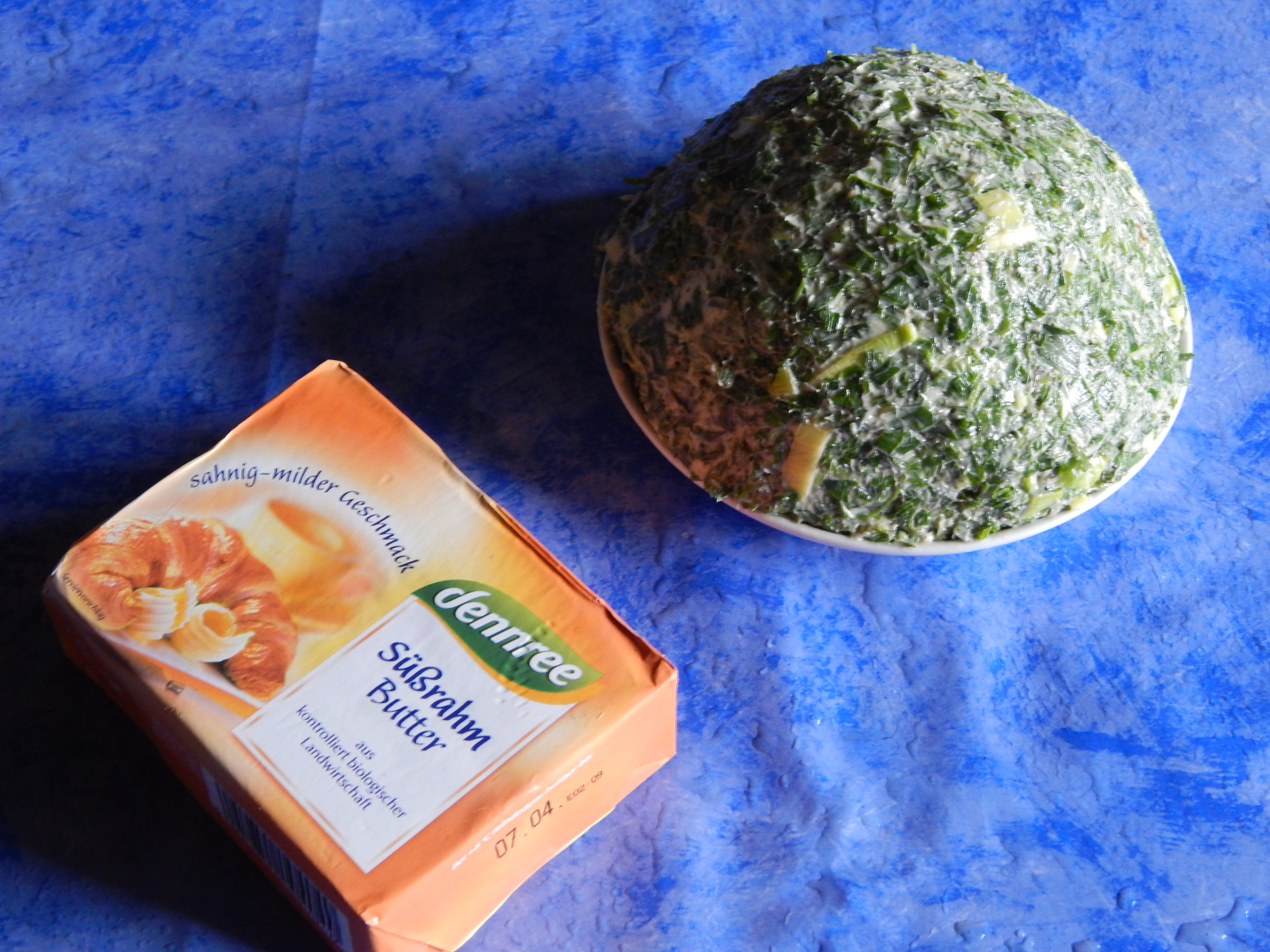
Used in herb butter

Young burnet leaves are used as an ingredient in salads, dressings, sauces, summer drinks, and in claret. It is also used to flavour vinegar, butter, and cream cheese.

It has a flavor described as "mildly cucumber, a bit tart, a little hot" and is considered interchangeable with mint leaves in some recipes, depending on the intended effect. Typically, the youngest leaves are used, as they tend to become bitter as they age; old leaves are cut back to encourage new growth.

Salad burnet was called a favorite herb by Francis Bacon, was brought to the New World with the first English colonists, and was given special mention by Thomas Jefferson. It declined in popularity as a kitchen herb, but as of 2022, is becoming more popular again, for food and as an ornamental.

=== Ornamental ===
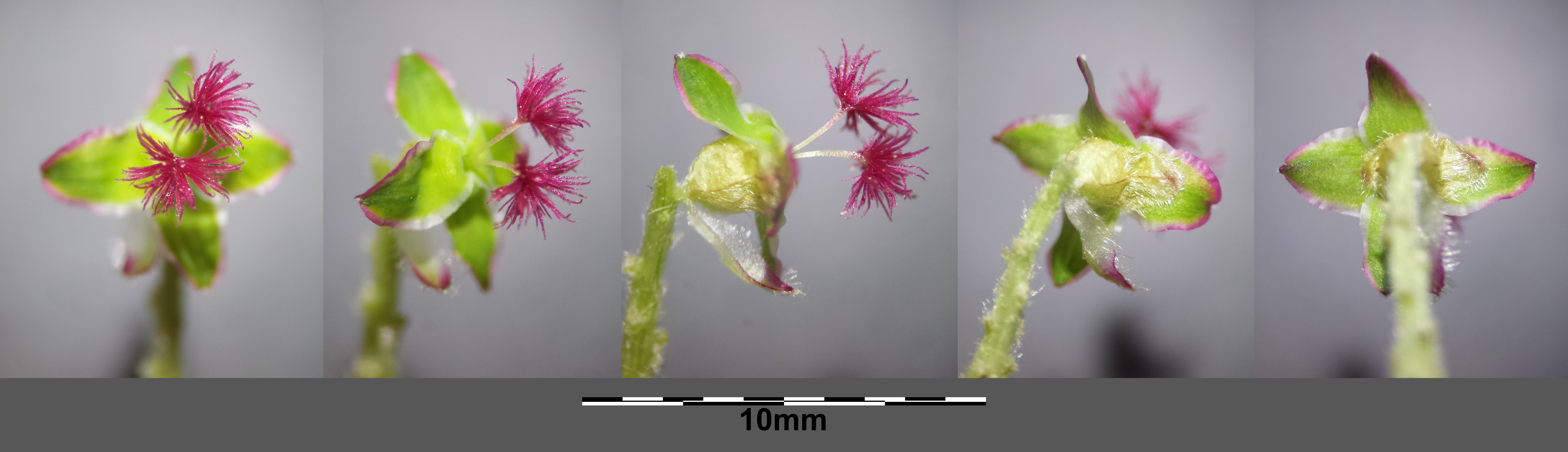
Female flower (male flower)

The unusual crimson, ball-shaped blooms are carried aloft on tall, thin stems, well above the ferny, toothed-leaf foliage. The leaves are often considered more ornamental than the flowers, which are often removed to encourage more foliage growth. However, the cut flowers are used in floral arrangements.

=== For wild and domestic animals ===
The flowers provide nectar and pollen, and attract bees, butterflies, moths, and other pollinators and beneficial insects. It is classified as a moderate honeybee food in New Zealand, and as a good nectar producer in the United States.

Salad burnet is good forage for wildlife and livestock, partly because it stays green for so long. Elk, deer, antelope and birds forage on the leaves and seeds. It provides cover for small birds, and it is used by the greater sage-grouse. It is planted on rangelands in western North America, including in pinyon-juniper woodlands, ponderosa pine forests, dry quaking aspen parklands, mountain grasslands, chaparral, desert and mountain shrublands, and sagebrush steppe. After the first year, it is grazed roughly every 35 days, or whenever it is 12 inches (30 cm) tall, until it is half that height.

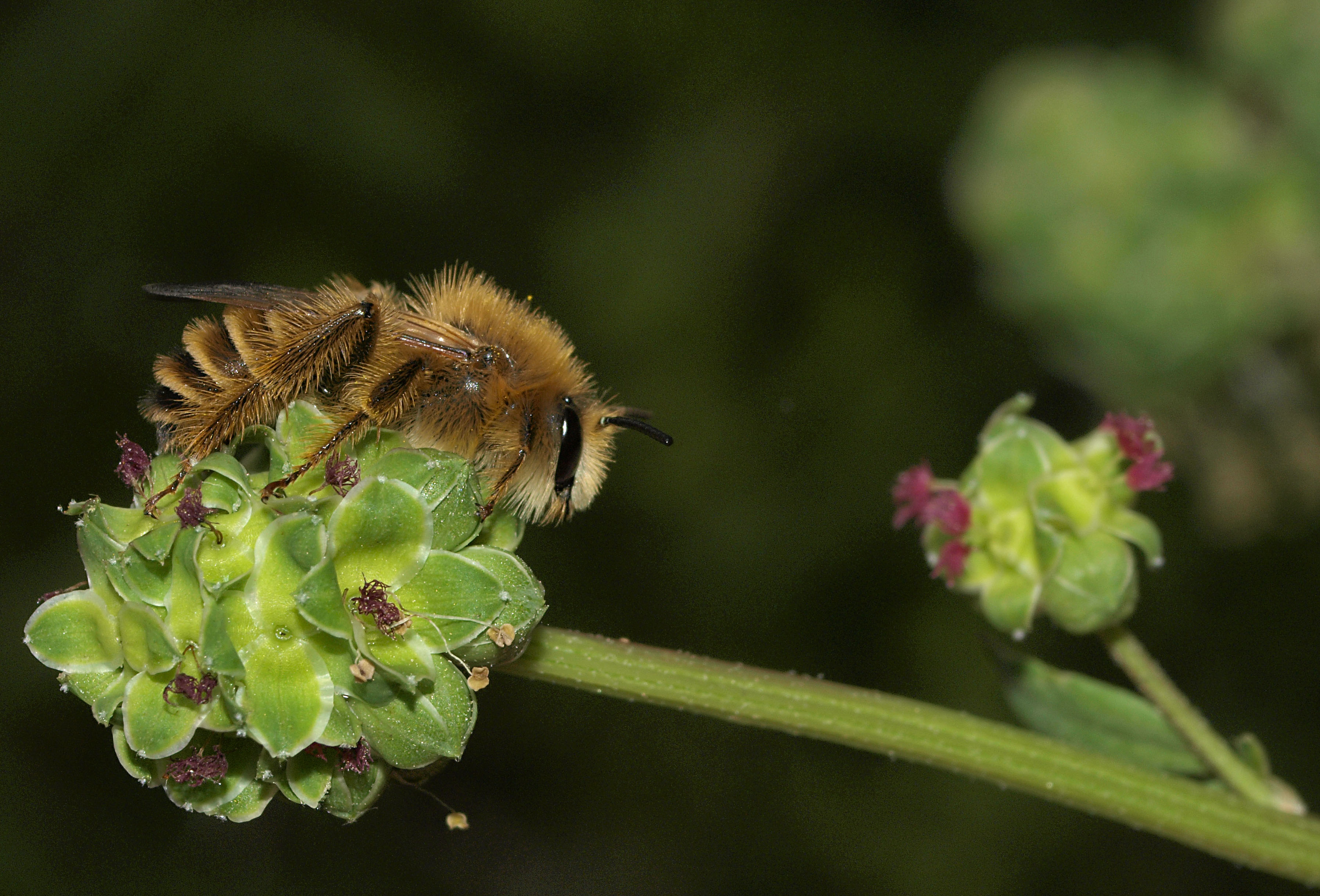
Salad burnet attracts bees.

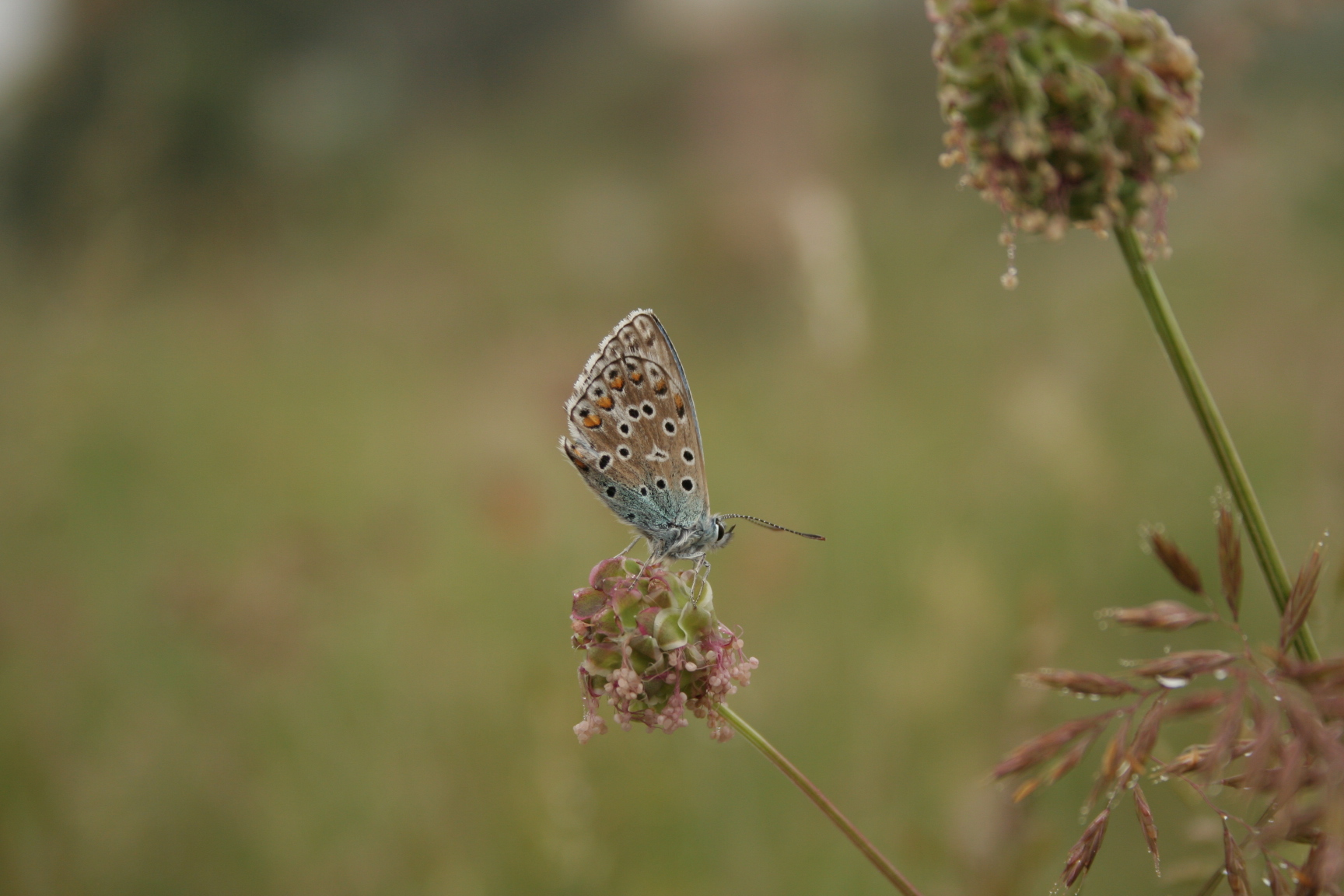
A butterfly on a flower cluster

=== Medicinally ===
Salad burnet has in the past been used medicinally in Europe to control bleeding.

Salad burnet has the same medicinal qualities as medicinal burnet (Sanguisorba officinalis). It was used as a tea to relieve diarrhea in the past.
