= Johann Andreas Benignus Bergsträsser =

Johann Andreas Benignus Bergsträsser (21 December 1732, in Idstein – 24 December 1812, in Hanau) was a German educator, philologist, and entomologist.

== Education ==
He studied philology and theology at the universities of Jena and Halle, and in 1756–58 worked as a teacher at the orphanage in Halle an der Saale. In 1760 he was appointed rector at the Evangelical Lutheran gymnasium in Hanau. In 1775 he obtained the title of professor and became a member of the consistory.

In 1784 he proposed a type of optical telegraph system to "connect" Leipzig with Hamburg. He initially tried a variety of other types of fire-related communications. But this connection used four different types of rockets: rockets without detonation; rockets with detonation; illuminating signal rockets and firework rockets.

== Selected works ==
- Realwörterbuch über die classischen Schriftsteller (7 volumes. Halle, 1772–81) – Dictionary on the classical authors.
- Chronologiae historicae particula prima (-secunda), scholarum in usus concinnatae, qua ad solemnem lycei lustrationem... (Hanovre, 2 volumes, 1778).
- Nomenclatur und Beschreibung der Insecten der Grafschaft Hanau-Münzenberg... (Hanau, three volumes, 1777–79) – Nomenclature and description of the insects of Hanau-Münzenberg.
- Jo. Andr. Benigni Bergstraesseri,... Icones papilionum diurnorum quotquot adhuc in Europa occurrunt descriptae... Decuria prima, oder Abbildungen und Beschreibungen aller bekannten europaeischen Tagfalter. Erstes Zehendt (Hanovre, 3 parts, 1779-1781).
- Ueber sein am ein und zwanzigsten December. 1784 angekündigtes Problem einer Korrespondenz in ab- und unabsehbaren Weiten der Kriegsvorfälle, oder über Synthematographik... (Hanau, three volumes, 1785–88).
- Ueber Signal-, Order- und Zielschreiberei in die Ferne... oder über Synthematographe und Telegraphe in der Vergleichung... (Francfort-sur-le-Main, 1795).
