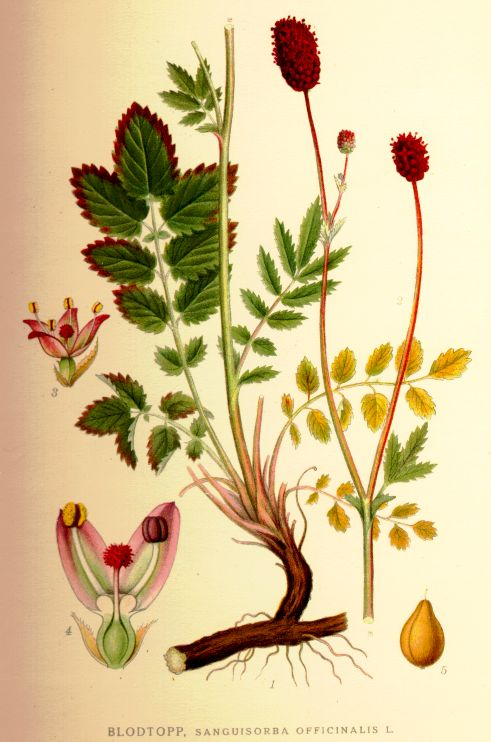

Conservation status
- Least Concern (IUCN 3.1)

- Secure (NatureServe)

Scientific classification
- Kingdom: Plantae
- Clade: Embryophytes
- Clade: Tracheophytes
- Clade: Angiosperms
- Clade: Eudicots
- Clade: Rosids
- Order: Rosales
- Family: Rosaceae
- Genus: Sanguisorba
- Species: S. officinalis

Binomial name
- Sanguisorba officinalis L.

Synonyms
- List: Pimpinella officinalis (L.) Lam.; Poterium boreale Salisb.; Poterium officinale (L.) A.Gray; Sanguisorba altissima Moench; Sanguisorba andersonii G.Don; Sanguisorba angustifolia Opiz; Sanguisorba auriculata Scop.; Sanguisorba baicalensis Popl.; Sanguisorba bracteosa Besser ex Eichw.; Sanguisorba carnea Fisch. ex Link; Sanguisorba cernua Besser; Sanguisorba cordifolia Opiz; Sanguisorba cylindrica Charb.; Sanguisorba glandulosa Kom.; Sanguisorba globularis Nakai ex T.H.Chung; Sanguisorba hispanica Mill.; Sanguisorba komaroviana Nedol.; Sanguisorba konradii Opiz; Sanguisorba longa (Kitag.) Kitag.; Sanguisorba major Gilib.; Sanguisorba media L.; Sanguisorba major Hill; Sanguisorba major Bubani; Sanguisorba microcephala C.Presl; Sanguisorba montana Jord. ex Boreau; Sanguisorba neglecta G.Don; Sanguisorba nudicaulis Raf.; Sanguisorba officinalis var. alba Nakai; Sanguisorba officinalis var. altissima Moench ex Steud.; Sanguisorba officinalis var. carnea (Fisch. ex Link) Regel ex Maxim.; Sanguisorba officinalis var. cordata Peterm.; Sanguisorba officinalis var. cordifolia Liou & C.Y.Li; Sanguisorba officinalis var. dilutiflora (Kitag.) Liou & C.Y.Li; Sanguisorba officinalis subsp. glandulosa (Kom.) Kamelin & Gubanov; Sanguisorba officinalis var. globularis (Nakai ex T.Kawamoto) W.Lee; Sanguisorba officinalis var. latifoliata Liou & C.Y.Li; Sanguisorba officinalis subsp. microcephala (C.Presl) Calder & Roy L.Taylor; Sanguisorba officinalis f. pallescens Asai; Sanguisorba officinalis f. pilosella (Ohwi) H.Hara; Sanguisorba officinalis var. typica Buia; Sanguisorba polygama F.Nyl.; Sanguisorba praecox Besser ex Rchb.; Sanguisorba rubra Schrank; Sanguisorba sabauda Mill.; Sanguisorba serotina Jord.; Sanguisorba serpentini H.J.Coste & Puech; Sanguisorba taurica Juz.; Sanguisorba unsanensis Nakai

= Sanguisorba officinalis =

Great burnet

Species of flowering plant in the rose family

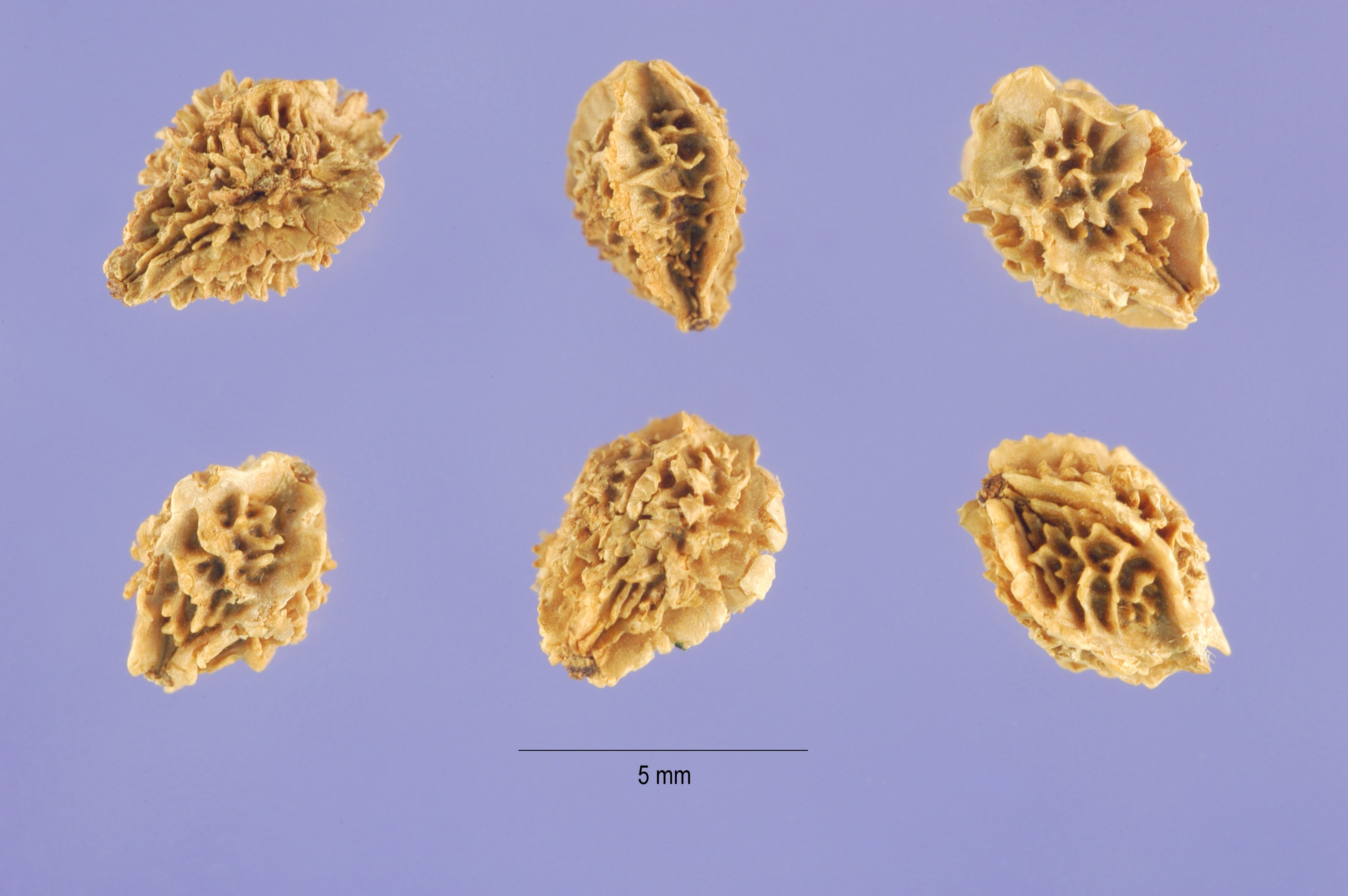
The dry fruits contain the achenes which contain the seeds.

Sanguisorba officinalis, commonly known as great burnet, is a plant in the family Rosaceae, subfamily Rosoideae. It is native throughout the cooler regions of the Northern Hemisphere in Europe, northern Asia, and northern North America.

Sanguisorba officinalis is an important food plant for the European large blue butterflies Phengaris nausithous and P. teleius.

== Description and habitats ==
It is a herbaceous perennial plant growing to 1 m (3 ft 3 in) tall, which occurs in grasslands, growing well on grassy banks. It flowers from June to September.

== Distribution ==
The species is native to the majority of Europe, Asia and the West Coast of Canada and the United States. It has been introduced to Finland in Europe and Peru in South America.

== Commercial uses ==
Use is made of its extensive root system for erosion control, as well as a bioremediator, used to reclaim derelict sites such as landfills.

== Ornamental ==
Sanguisorba officinalis is one of several Sanguisorba species cultivated as ornamental plants. The cultivar 'Tanna' is widely available, and has won the Royal Horticultural Society's Award of Garden Merit. The synonym Sanguisorba menziesii is also listed as having gained the Award.

== Ethnomedical uses ==
It has been used in traditional Chinese medicine (TCM) where it is known by the name Di Yu. It is said to cool the blood, stop bleeding, clear heat, and heal wounds.

Specifically, the root is used to stop bloody dysentery, nosebleeds, and is applied topically to treat burns and insect bites.

== Phytochemistry ==
Sanguiin H-6 is a dimeric ellagitannin that can be found in S. officinalis.

Ziyuglycoside II is a triterpenoid saponin that can be found in S. officinalis.
