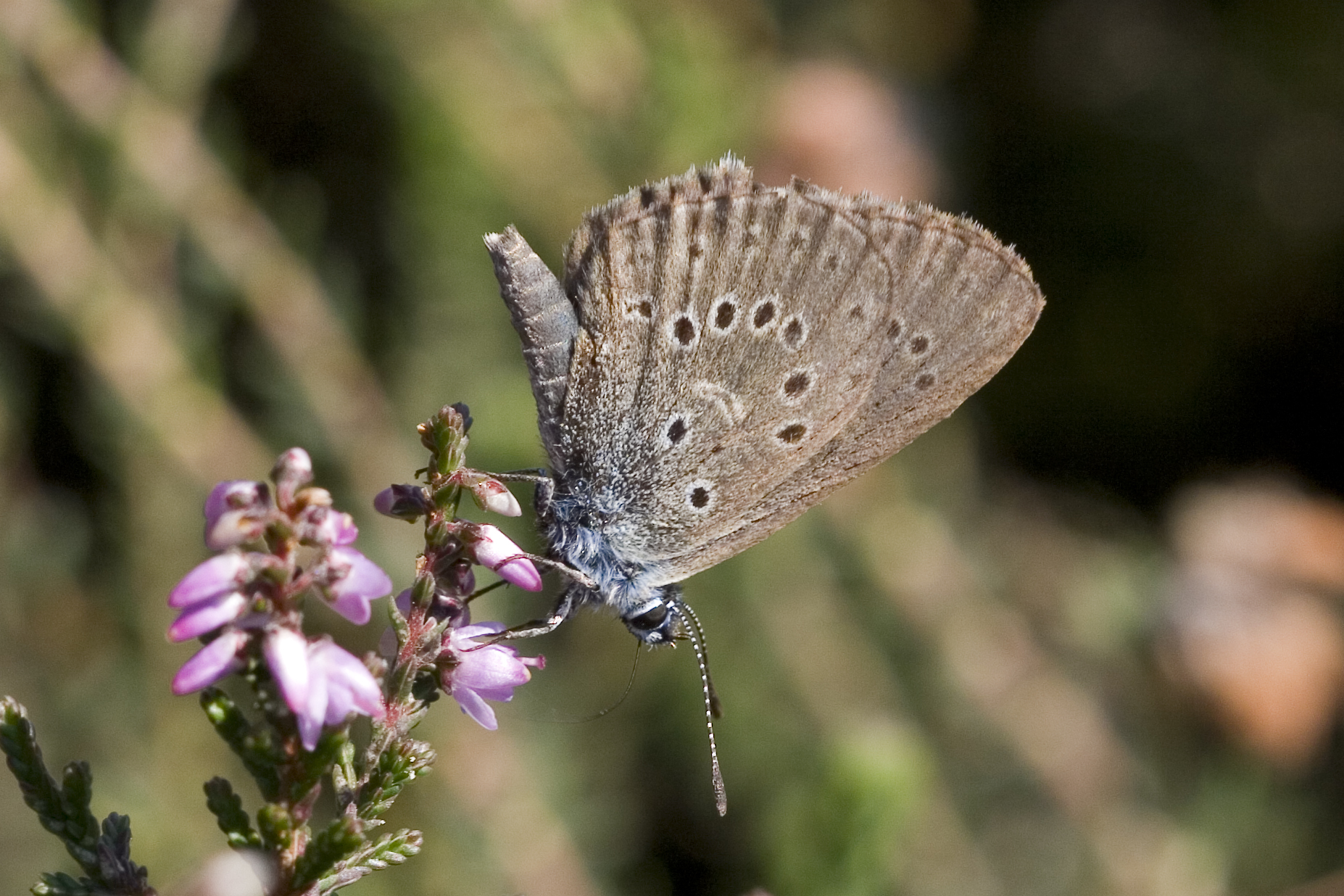

Conservation status
- Least Concern (IUCN 3.1)

Scientific classification
- Kingdom: Animalia
- Phylum: Arthropoda
- Clade: Pancrustacea
- Class: Insecta
- Order: Lepidoptera
- Family: Lycaenidae
- Genus: Phengaris
- Species: P. alcon

Binomial name
- Phengaris alcon (Denis & Schiffermüller, 1775)

Synonyms
- Glaucopsyche alcon; Maculinea alcon (Denis & Schiffermüller, 1775)

= Phengaris alcon =

Alcon blue

Species of butterfly

Phengaris alcon, the Alcon blue or Alcon large blue, is a butterfly of the family Lycaenidae and is found in Europe and across the Palearctic to Siberia and Mongolia.

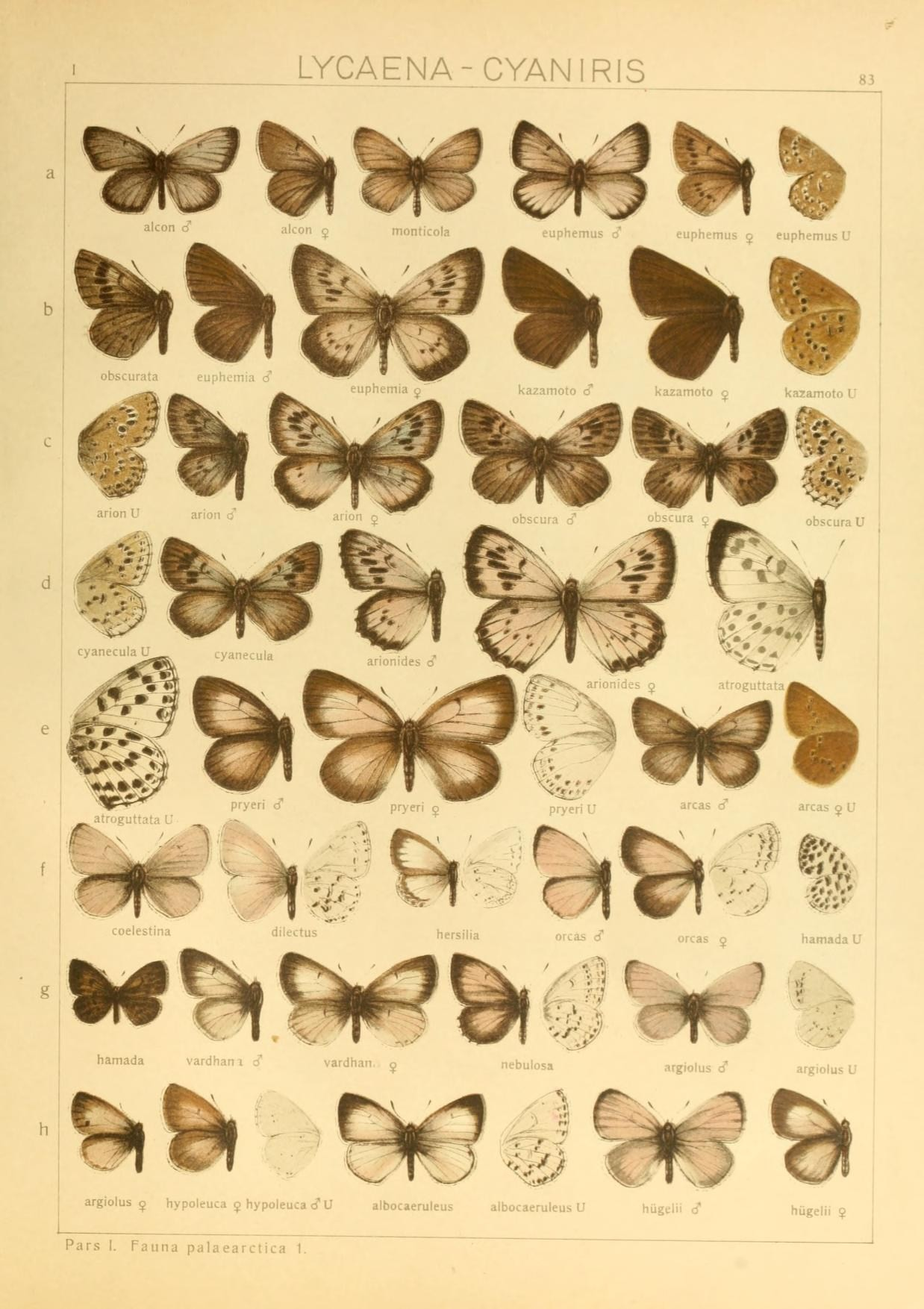
Seitz 83a

== Description from Seitz ==
L. alcon Schiff. (= areas Esp., euphemus Godt.) (83 a). Large, the male above deep blue, but without brilliant gloss. The female black-brown, dusted with dark blue in the basal area. The dark violet-grey underside has numerous ocelli. L. alcon is easily distinguished from the following species (coeligena [L. coeligena Oberth. China], euphemus, arcas, arion, arionides ...) by the male bearing on the blue disc of the forewing no other black spots but the discocellular lunule. Central Europe and North Asia, from the coast of the North Sea (Hamburg, Bremen, Belgium) to the Mediterranean, and from France to the Altai, Dauria and Tibet, ab. nigra Wheel, has the males strongly darkened, the females being quite black above. In ab. cecinae Hormuz. the ocelli of the underside are absent or strongly reduced. In ab. pallidior Schultz the margin is grey instead of black. – marginepunctata Gillm. has a row of black dots before the margin, almost parallel with it; found by Hafner at Loitsch and other places in Carniola.— In the form rebeli Hirschke the blue of the upperside is more brilliant and more extended, the dark margin being reduced, in the female only the apical area black; Styria. – monticola Stgr. (83 a) has a narrow black margin like rebeli, but the blue is very deep and dark, so dull as in true alcon; from the Alps of Switzerland and the Caucasus. – Egg white, finely reticulated, laid on the flowers of the food-plant (Gentiana pneumonanthe). The larva generally does not break through the shell on the upperside, so that the holes of empty eggs are not easily noticed. At first grey, later on reddish brown with dark dorsal line and dark head. The butterflies occur on damp meadows where Gentiana grows; they are plentiful in such places, sometimes even in abundance, from the end of May into July, in the North not before the end of June.

== Taxonomy ==
There are five subspecies:

- P. a. alcon (Central Europe)
- P. a. jeniseiensis (Shjeljuzhko, 1928) (southern Siberia)
- P. a. sevastos Rebel & Zerny, 1931 (Carpathians)
- P. a. xerophila Berger, 1946 (Central Europe)
- †P. a. arenaria (Netherlands)

There has been controversy over whether Phengaris rebeli, currently regarded as an ecotype within the Alcons, should be listed as a separate species. The two types are morphologically indistinguishable and molecular analysis has revealed little genetic difference, mostly attributable to localized habitat adaptation. Still some maintain that they should be treated as distinct species, especially for conservation purposes, because they parasitise different host ant colonies and parasitise these ants at different rates, and also rely on different host plant species (Gentiana pneumonanthe in the case of Phengaris alcon and Gentiana cruciata in the case of Phengaris rebeli).

The Dutch alcon blue (Phengaris alcon arenaria) was a subspecies of the alcon blue butterfly. There is not much known about this subspecies, but it has always been very rare. It was endemic to the Netherlands, where two populations were known. One in Meijendel (dunes north of The Hague), and in the Meije (in the neighbourhood of the Nieuwkoopse Plassen). The population in the Meije disappeared in 1975 and in Meijendel this subspecies disappeared in 1979.

== Ecology ==
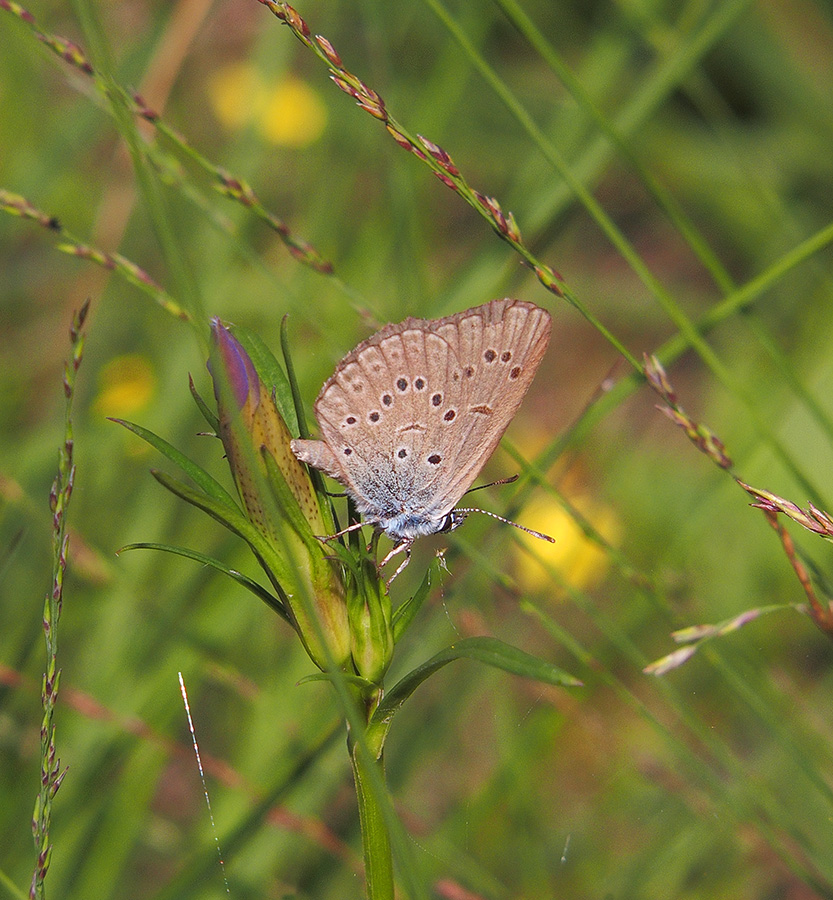
Alcon blue depositing an egg

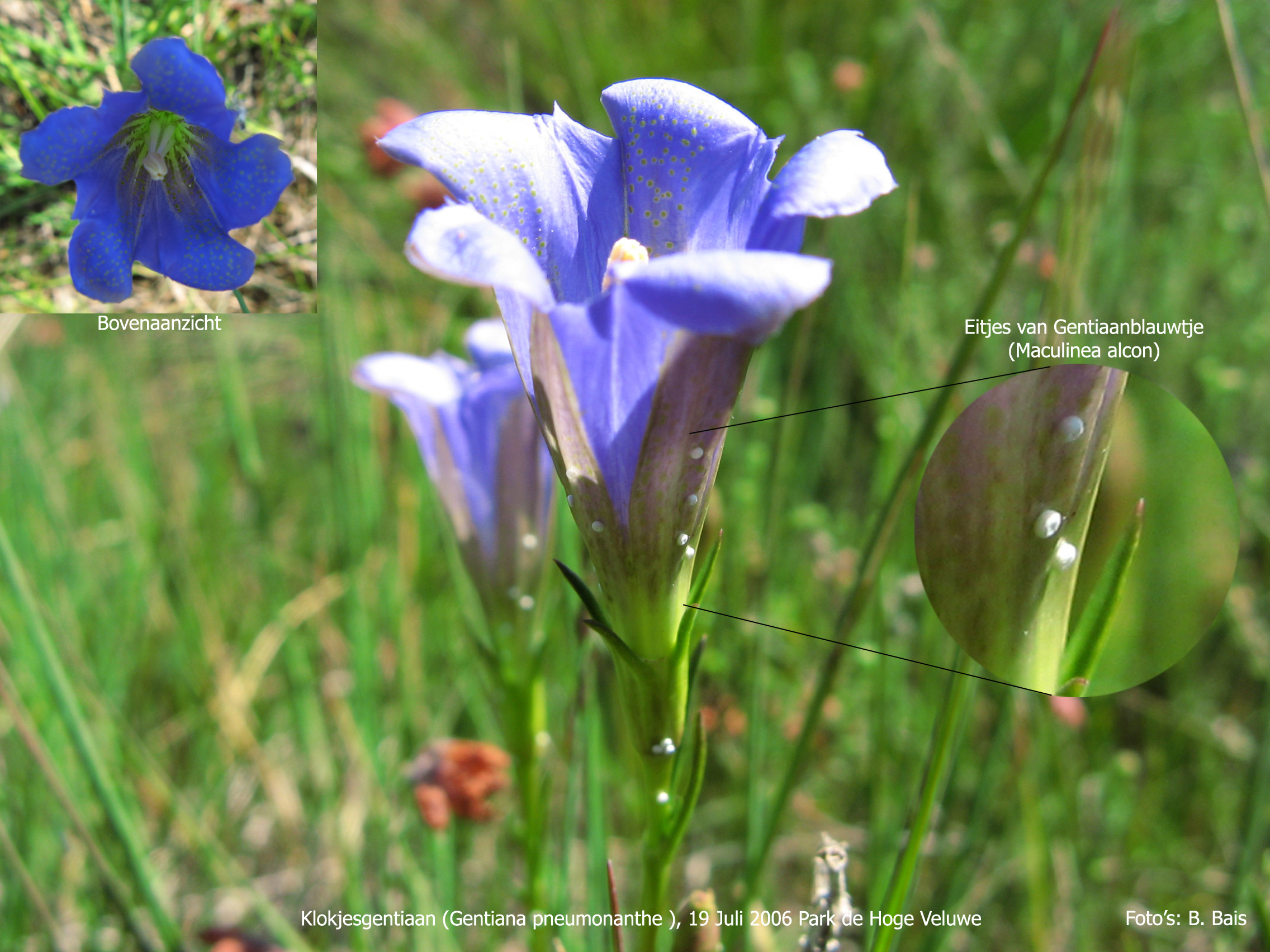
Alcon blue eggs on marsh gentian

The species can be seen flying in mid- to late summer. It lays its eggs onto the marsh gentian (Gentiana pneumonanthe); in the region of the Alps they are sometimes also found on the related willow gentian (Gentiana asclepiadea). The caterpillars eat no other plants.

=== Parasitic relationship ===
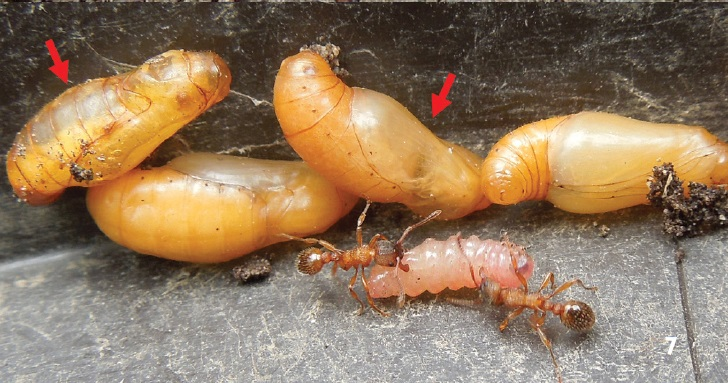
Pupa in ant nest

Like some other species of Lycaenidae, the larval (caterpillar) stage of P. alcon depends on support by certain ants; it is therefore known as a myrmecophile.

Alcon larvae leave the food plant when they have grown sufficiently (4th instar, or shedding) and wait on the ground below to be discovered by ants. The larvae emit surface chemicals (allomones) that closely match those of ant larvae, causing the ants to carry the Alcon larvae into their nests and place them in their brood chambers. Once adopted into a nest, Alcon larvae are fed the regurgitations of nurse ants (just as other ant brood), a process called trophallaxis. This parasitic method is known as the "cuckoo" strategy and is an alternative to the predatory strategy employed by most other members of the genus such as Phengaris arion. Though less common, the cuckoo strategy has been found to have several advantages over the predatory strategy. For one, it is more trophically efficient than preying directly on other ant grubs, and as a result, significantly more cuckoo-type larvae can be supported per nest than predatory larvae. Another advantage of cuckoo feeding is that individuals, having pursued a higher degree of social integration, have a higher chance of surviving when a nest is overcrowded or facing food shortage because ants preferentially feed the larvae; compared to the type of scramble competition that can devastate predatory larvae, this contest competition results in much lower mortality. Though the cuckoo strategy has its advantages, it also comes with important costs; with greater host ant specialization comes much more limited ecological niches.

When the Alcon larva is fully developed it pupates. Once the adult hatches it will leave the ant nest.

Over time, some ant colonies that are parasitized in this manner will slightly change their larva chemicals as a defence, leading to an evolutionary "arms race" between the two species.

Generally, Lycaenidae species which have a myrmecophilous relationship with the ant genus Myrmica are locked to primary host specificity. The Alcon blue is unusual in this regard in that it uses different host species in different locations throughout Europe, and often uses multiple host species even within the same location and population. Though it may be adopted into the nests of multiple Myrmica species within a given site, there is typically one "primary" species with which the locally adapted larvae can best socially integrate, leading to drastically higher survival rates. Across Europe, Alcons are known to use Myrmica scabrinodis, Myrmica ruginodis, Myrmica rubra, Myrmica sabuleti, Myrmica schencki, and rarely Myrmica lonae, and Myrmica specioides.

=== Predation ===
P. alcon larvae are sought underground by the Ichneumon eumerus wasp. On detecting a P. alcon larva the wasp enters the nest and sprays a pheromone that causes the ants to attack each other. In the resulting confusion the wasp locates the butterfly larva and injects it with its eggs. On pupation, the wasp eggs hatch and consume the chrysalis from the inside.

== See also ==
- Orachrysops niobe Brenton blue butterfly from South Africa, with a similar life cycle
