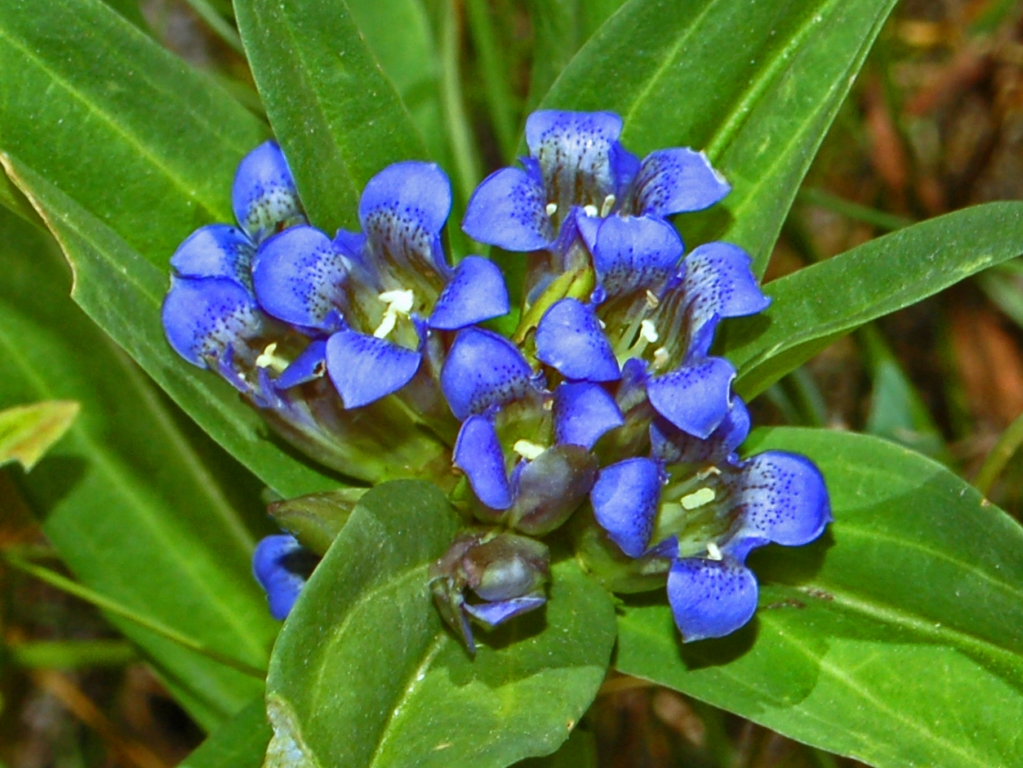

Scientific classification
- Kingdom: Plantae
- Clade: Tracheophytes
- Clade: Angiosperms
- Clade: Eudicots
- Clade: Asterids
- Order: Gentianales
- Family: Gentianaceae
- Genus: Gentiana
- Species: G. cruciata

Binomial name
- Gentiana cruciata L.

Synonyms
- Tretorhiza cruciata (L.) Delarbre

= Gentiana cruciata =

Species of plant

Gentiana cruciata, the star gentian or cross gentian, is a herbaceous perennial flowering plant in the Gentianaceae family.

== Description ==
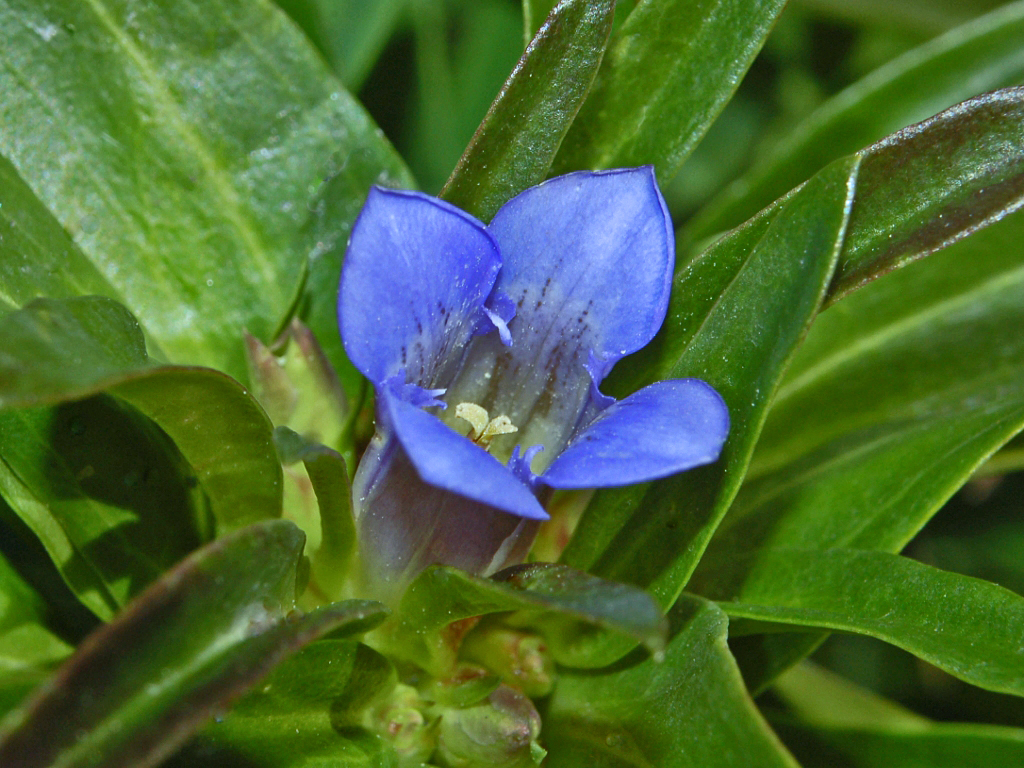
Close-up on a flower of Gentiana cruciata

Gentiana cruciata is a hemicryptophyte scapose plant of small size, reaching on average 20–40 centimetres (7.9–15.7 in) in height. It has erect stems, the leaves are large, ovate-lanceolate, semiamplexicaul, about 3–8 centimetres (1.2–3.1 in) long. The flowers are violet-blue trumpets with 4 petals, clustered in the axils of upper leaves. The flowering period extends from June to August. The flowers are hermaphrodite and pollinated by insects (entomogamy). The fruit is a capsule. The seeds are dispersed by gravity alone (barochory).

== Distribution ==
Gentiana cruciata is widespread in most of Europe (except Portugal, Great Britain and Scandinavia) and in Western Asia.

== Habitat ==
This plant prefers dry calcareous soil in forest edges, bushy slopes, pastures, grasslands and dry meadows, at an altitude of 200–1,600 metres (660–5,250 ft) above sea level.

== Host for Phengaris rebeli ==
Phengaris rebeli is an endangered butterfly which feeds upon G. cruciata. Female P. rebeli lay their eggs on the upper side of G. cruciata leaves and three to four weeks later, the P. rebeli larvae emerge and begin to feed on the seeds and flowers of this grassland plant. After the P. rebeli reaches its fourth larval instar, it drops to the ground to be picked up by Myrmica schencki ants and brought to their nests.

Female P. rebeli prefer to lay eggs on G. cruciata growing in clumps rather than individual plants, and on the taller plants, as they are less shaded and allow the eggs to grow and develop faster.

== Cultural Importance ==
According to Hungarian legend, a pestilence spread throughout the kingdom during King Ladislaus's reign. Ladislaus prayed for a cure; he then shot an arrow into the air at random, hitting a star gentian plant which cured the illness. This plant became known as "Saint Ladislaus's herb" in Hungary.

== Gallery ==
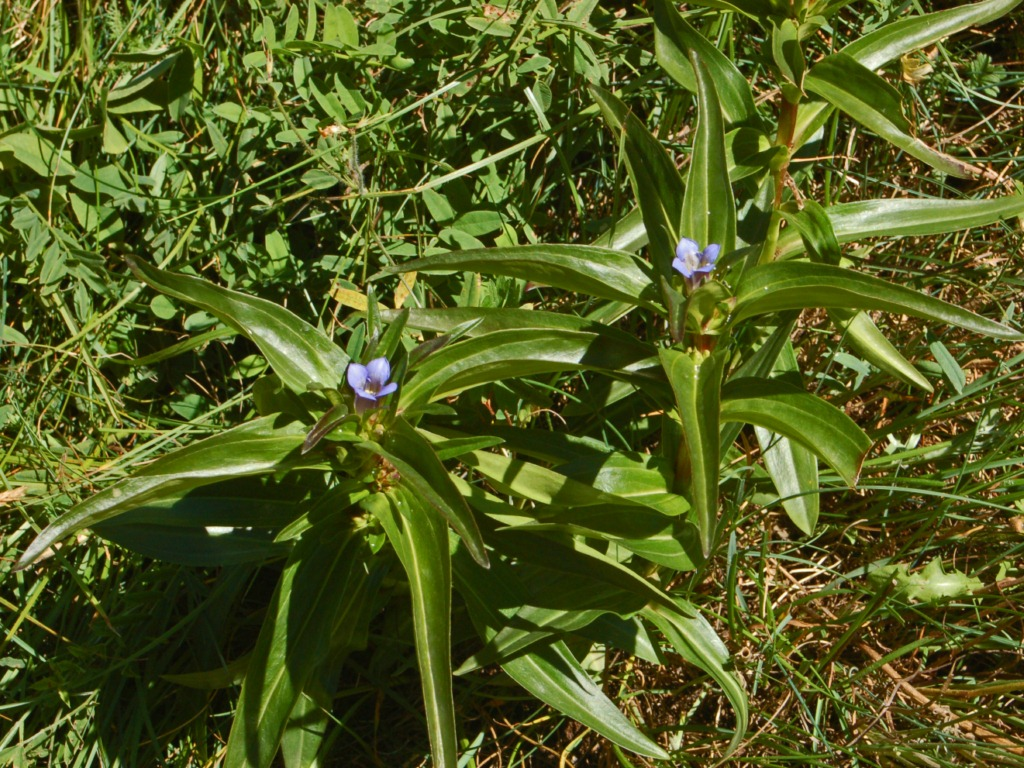
Plants of Gentiana cruciata

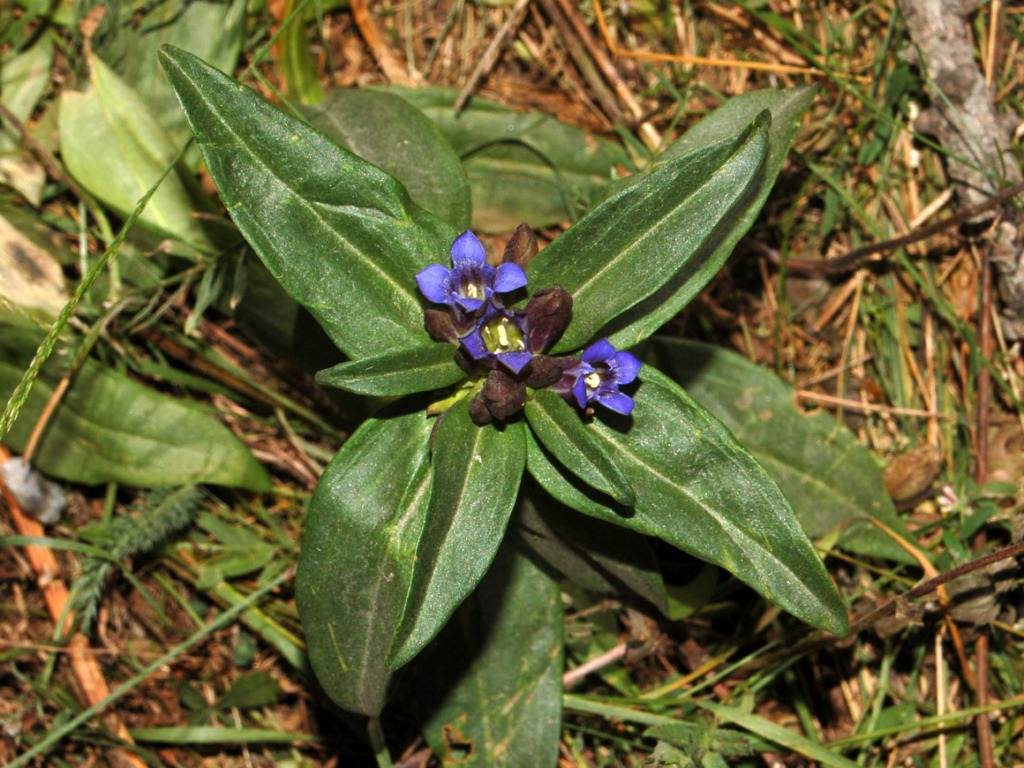
Plant of Gentiana cruciata

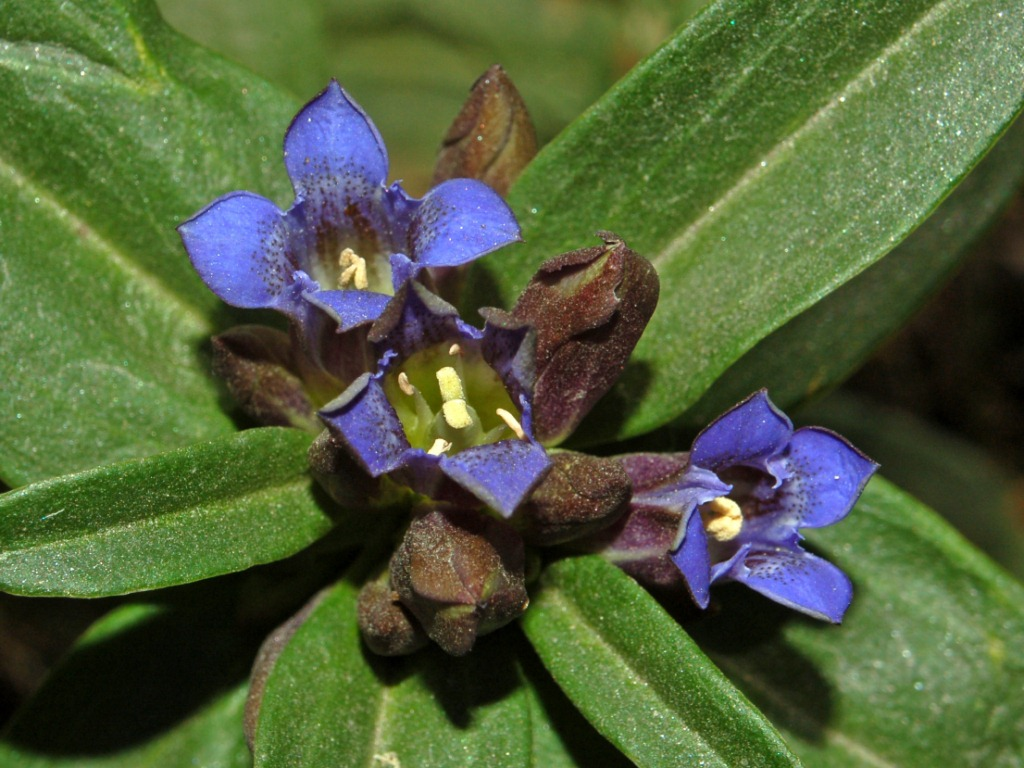
Flowers of Gentiana cruciata

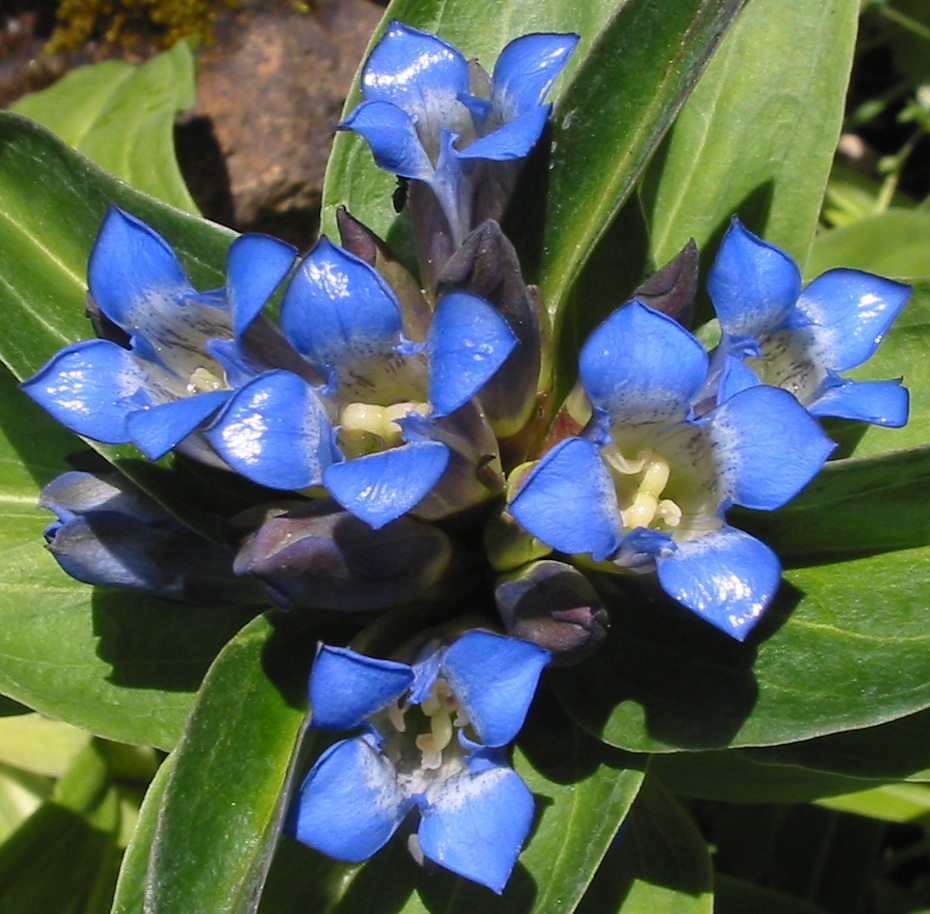
Close-up on flowers of Gentiana cruciata
