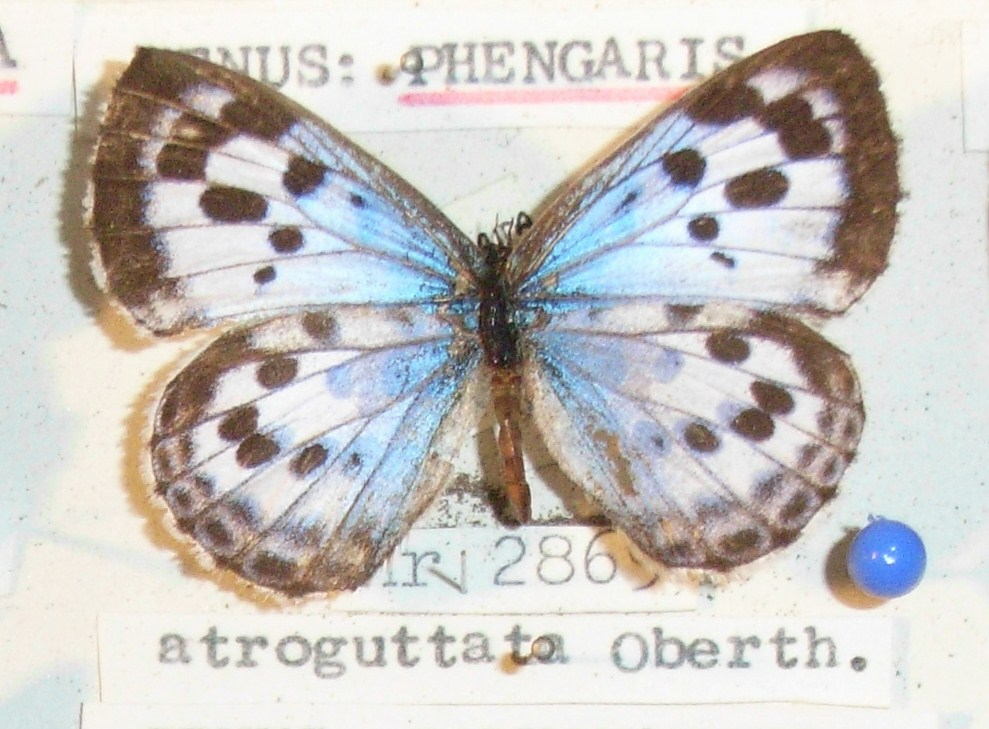

Scientific classification
- Kingdom: Animalia
- Phylum: Arthropoda
- Class: Insecta
- Order: Lepidoptera
- Family: Lycaenidae
- Genus: Phengaris
- Species: P. atroguttata

Binomial name
- Phengaris atroguttata (Oberthür 1876)

Synonyms
- Phengaris juenana (Forster, 1940); Phengaris lampra (Röber, 1926)

= Phengaris atroguttata =

Great spotted blue

Species of butterfly

Phengaris atroguttata, the great spotted blue, is a small butterfly found in India, Myanmar, and China that belongs to the lycaenids or blues family.

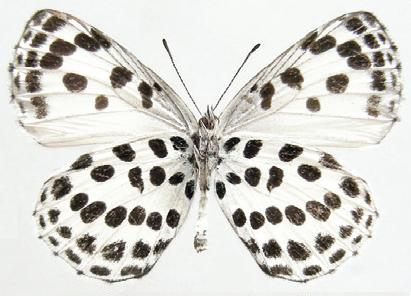
Underside

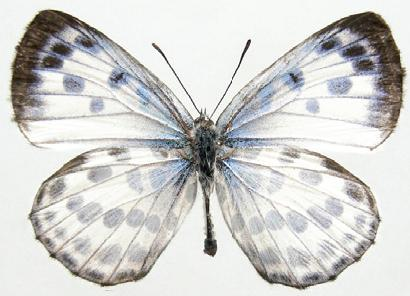
Upperside

== Taxonomy ==
The butterfly was earlier known as Polyommatus atroguttata (Oberthür).

== Range ==
It is found in Nagaland and the Chin Hills of Myanmar and is considered rare.

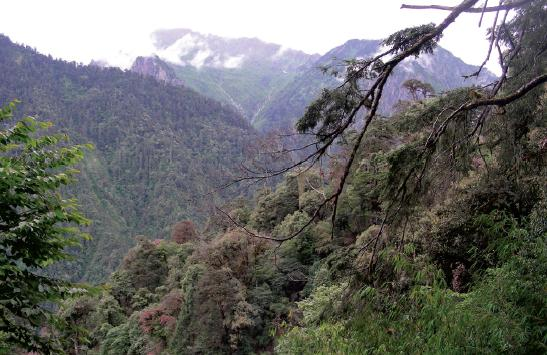
The habitat of Phengaris atroguttata and Phengaris xiushani in north-western Yunnan, alt. 2,800 meters

== Subspecies ==
- Phengaris atroguttata atroguttata northwest India, west China and Taiwan
- Phengaris atroguttata juenana (Forster, 1940) Yunnan
- Phengaris atroguttata lampra (Röber, 1926) north Myanmar
- Phengaris daitozana Wileman, 1911

== Description ==
The butterfly ranges from 44 to 48 mm. The butterfly is white with pale blue suffusion, and, also a dark border on the forewing. The male butterfly has very large black discal spots showing through from below. These are darkened in above in the case of the female butterfly.

== See also ==
- List of butterflies of India (Lycaenidae)
