= Hans Hirschke =

Austrian entomologist

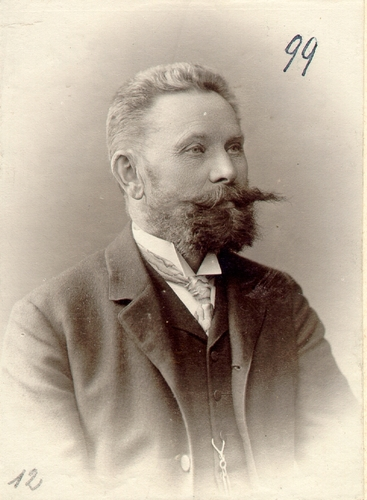
Hanns Hirschke Porträt im Fotoalbum Österr. Ent. Ver. Wien

Hans Hirschke, sometimes Hanns (1850, Brno-1921, Vienna), was an Austrian entomologist who specialised in Lepidoptera. He was first a linen weaver in Brno, then a gardener's apprentice. In 1899, he was Head of the Exchange Office Vienna and a Member of the Entomological Association of Vienna (Österreichischen Entomologischen Vereins). Hans Hirschke described Alcis bastelbergeri and Phengaris rebeli in Jber. Wien. ent. Ver.
