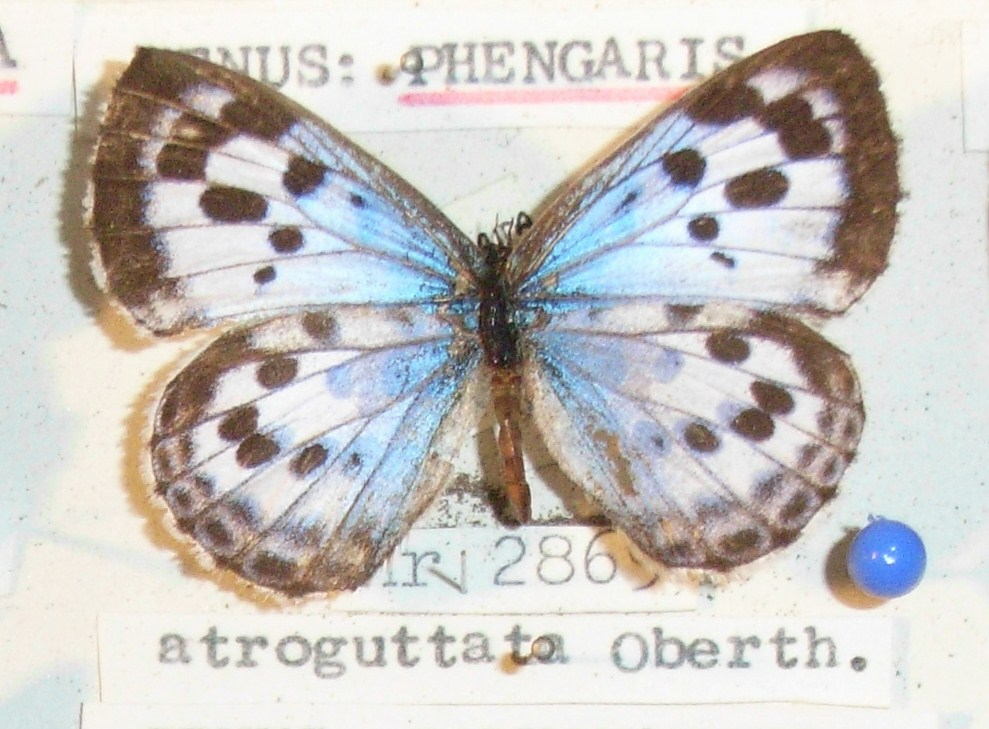
- The great spotted blue (P. atroguttata), one of the "traditional" Phengaris.

Scientific classification
- Domain: Eukaryota
- Kingdom: Animalia
- Phylum: Arthropoda
- Class: Insecta
- Order: Lepidoptera
- Family: Lycaenidae
- Subfamily: Polyommatinae
- Tribe: Polyommatini
- Genus: Phengaris; Doherty, 1891

Synonyms
- Maculinea (van Eecke, 1915)

= Phengaris =

Butterfly genus in family Lycaenidae

Phengaris is a genus of gossamer-winged butterflies in the subfamily Polyommatinae. Commonly, these butterflies are called large blues, which if referring to a particular species is P. arion, a species resident in Europe and some parts of Asia.

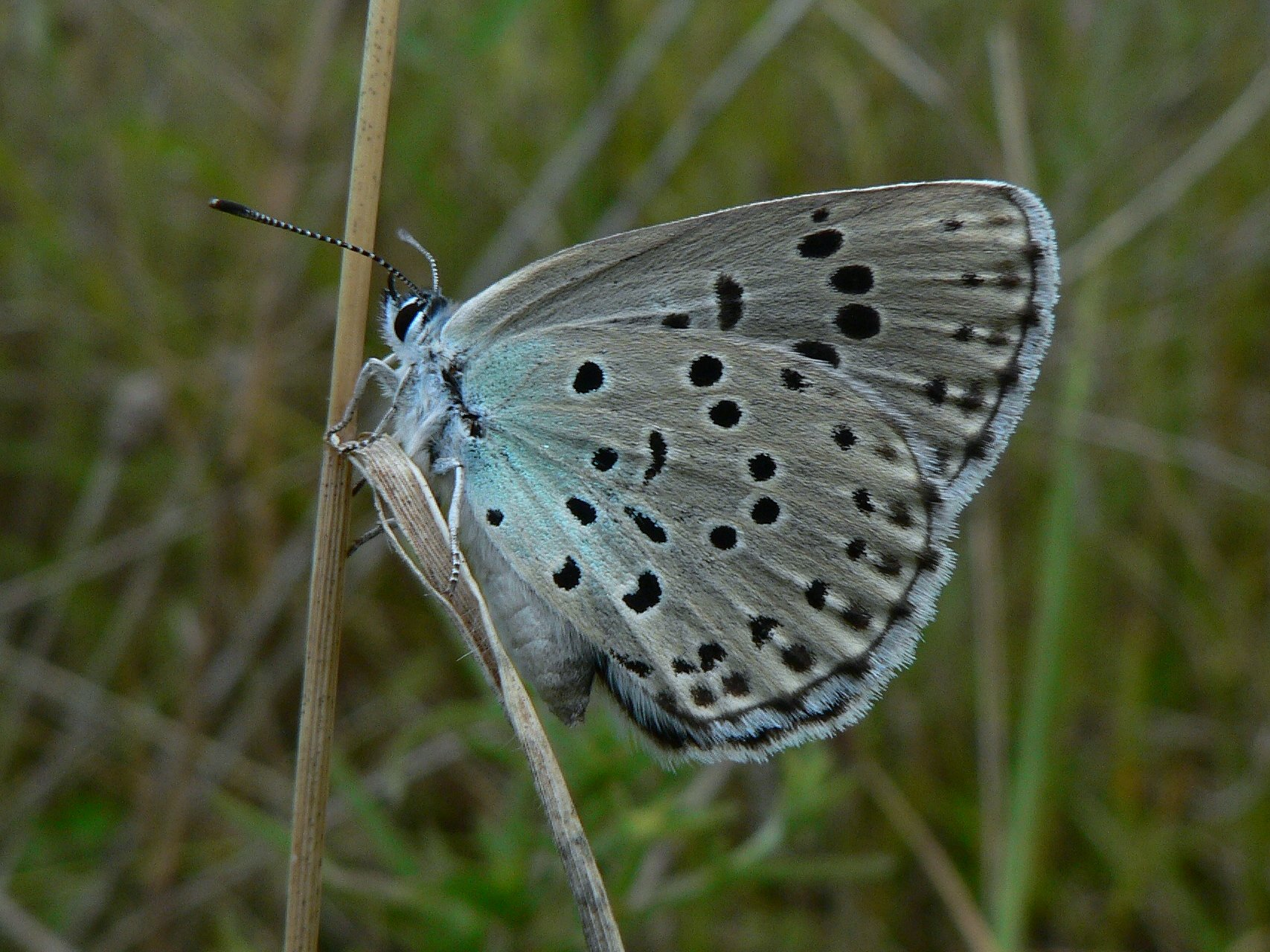
Underside of the large blue (P. arion), formerly in Maculinea in Rabastens-de-Bigorre, Hautes-Pyrénées, France

Phengaris is currently defined to include the genus Maculinea. The type species of the latter was the Alcon blue ("M." alcon). This species was found to be less closely related to most other supposed members of Maculinea than the traditional Phengaris species, and hence the two genera were merged to form a monophyletic group. Alternatively, Maculinea could be restricted to the one or two species of "Alcon" blues, and the rest of it be separated as a new genus. But this would create two very small genera, which is generally avoided by modern taxonomists. As Phengaris is the older name, it thus replaces Maculinea.

Maculinea was alternatively considered to be a subgenus of Glaucopsyche. But while Glaucopsyche and Phengaris (including Maculinea) are certainly close relatives, they are unlikely to be that close.

The most recently discovered species in the genus is P. xiushani, first reported in 2010 and found in undisturbed forested mountains, unlike all the other members which live in grasslands over their entire range of distribution.

== Species ==
The species, listed in the presumed phylogenetic sequence from the most ancestral to the most apomorphic, are:

Basal group (Maculinea sensu stricto)

- Phengaris alcon – Alcon blue, Alcon large blue
  - †Phengaris alcon arenaria – Dutch Alcon blue
- Phengaris rebeli – mountain Alcon blue (may belong in P. alcon)

Phengaris sensu stricto

- Phengaris albida (Leech, 1893)
- Phengaris atroguttata – great spotted blue
- Phengaris daitozana (Wileman, 1908)
- Phengaris xiushani Wang & Settele, 2010 – Xiushan's large blue

Other "Maculinea"

- Phengaris arion – large blue
- Phengaris arionides – greater large blue
- Phengaris cyanecula (Eversmann, 1848)
  - Phengaris cyanecula cyanecula Mongolia
  - Phengaris cyanecula obscurior (Staudinger, 1901) Tian-Shan
  - Phengaris cyanecula taras (Fruhstorfer, 1915) Alay Mountains
  - Phengaris cyanecula ussuriensis (Sheljuzhko, 1928) Amur Oblast, Ussuri
- Phengaris kurentzovi (Sibatani, Saigusa & Hirowatari, 1994)
  - Phengaris kurentzovi kurentzovi northern China and Korea
  - Phengaris kurentzovi daurica Dubatolov, 1999 Transbaikalia
- Phengaris ligurica (Wagner, 1904) (may belong in P. arion)
- Phengaris nausithous – dusky large blue
- Phengaris ogumae (Matsumura, 1910) (tentatively placed here)
  - Phengaris ogumae ogumae Japan
  - Phengaris ogumae doii (Matsumura, 1928) Kuriles
- Phengaris takamukui
- Phengaris teleius – scarce large blue

Incertae sedis

- Phengaris xiaheana (Murayama, 1919)
