= Polymorphism in Lepidoptera =

Many types of polymorphism can be seen in the insect order Lepidoptera. Polymorphism is the appearance of forms or "morphs" differing in color and number of attributes within a single species. In Lepidoptera, polymorphism can be seen not only between individuals in a population but also between the sexes as sexual dimorphism, between geographically separated populations in geographical polymorphism and also between generations flying at different seasons of the year (seasonal polymorphism). It also includes the phenomenon of mimicry when mimetic morphs fly alongside non-mimetic morphs in a population of a particular species. Polymorphism occurs both at a specific level with heritable variation in the overall morphological design of individuals as well as in certain specific morphological or physiological traits within a species.

== Genetic polymorphism ==
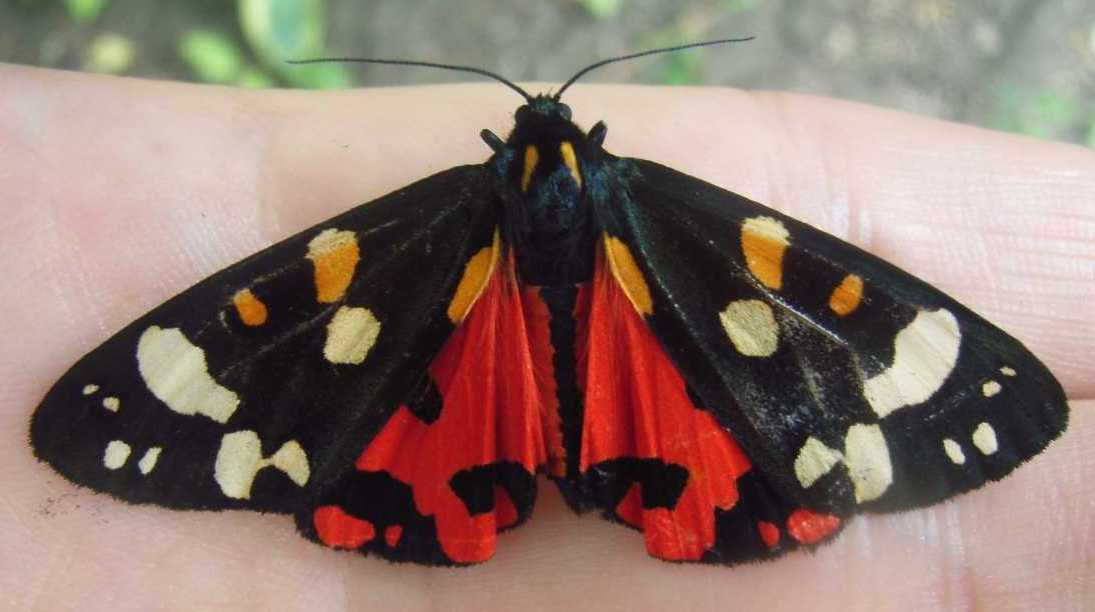
Callimorpha dominula morpha typica with spread wings: the moth manifests in two homozygous morphs and one heterozygous morph.

Genetic polymorphism occurs when the morphs are a result of genetic determination only. The extreme case of genetic polymorphism is that of the papilionid great Mormon (Papilio memnon), where four male forms and many as twenty-six female forms are reported. This species, and others in its genus, have been extensively studied for understanding the genetic basis for polymorphism and Batesian mimicry.

In the case of the scarlet tiger moth Callimorpha (Panaxia) dominula (family Arctiidae), which is a diurnal moth that occurs in continental Europe, western Asia, and southern England, three forms occur in England: the typical homozygote; the rare homozygote (bimacula) and the heterozygote (medionigra). It was studied there by E. B. Ford, and later by P. M. Sheppard and their co-workers over many years. Data is available from 1939 to the present day, acquired by the usual field method of capture-mark-release-recapture and by genetic analysis from breeding in captivity. The records cover gene frequency and population size for much of the twentieth century. In this instance, the genetics appears to be simple: two alleles at a single locus, producing the three phenotypes. Total captures over 26 years 1939–1964 came to 15,784 homozygous dominula (i.e. typica), 1,221 heterozygous medionigra, and 28 homozygous bimacula. Assuming equal viability of the genotypes 1,209 heterozygotes would be expected, so the field results do not suggest any heterozygous advantage. Sheppard found that the polymorphism is maintained by selective mating: each genotype preferentially mates with other morphs. This is sufficient to maintain the system, although in this case the heterozygote has slightly lower viability. Another example is the genetic polymorphism of larval developmental rates seen in the Phengaris rebeli, in which there exist slow-developing larvae (SDL) (75% of the total P. rebeli larval population) and fast-developing larvae (FDL) (25% of the total P. rebeli larvae population). The slow-developing larvae do not grow much during the first year, but grow rapidly during the early part of the second summer and remain a second winter within the ant colonies. On the other hand, the FDL complete their growth the following spring after they are taken into the ant nest.

== Sexual dimorphism ==
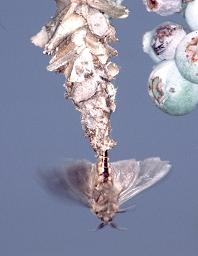
Adult bagworm moths (Tinea ephemeraeformis) mating

Sexual dimorphism is the occurrence of differences between males and females in a species. In Lepidoptera, sexual dimorphism is widespread and almost completely determined by genetic determination. Sexual dimorphism is present in all families of the Papilionoidea and more prominent in the Lycaenidae, Pieridae, and certain taxa of the Nymphalidae. Apart from a color variation which may differ from slight to completely different color-pattern combinations, secondary sexual characteristics may also be present. Different genotypes maintained by natural selection may also be expressed simultaneously. Polymorphic and/or mimetic females occur in the case of some taxa in the Papilionidae primarily to obtain a level of protection not available to the male of their species.

The most distinct case of sexual dimorphism is that of adult females of many Psychidae species who have only vestigial wings, legs, and mouthparts as compared to the adult males who are strong fliers with well-developed wings and feathery antennae.

== Geographical polymorphism ==
Geographical polymorphism is where geographical isolation causes a divergence of a species into different morphs. A good example is the Indian white admiral (Limenitis procris) which has five forms, each geographically separated from the other by large mountain ranges. An even more dramatic showcase of geographical polymorphism is the Apollo butterfly (Parnassius apollo). Due to the Apollos living in small local populations and having no contact with each other, but because of the strong stenotopic species and weak migration ability interbreeding between populations of one species practically does not occur; they form over 600 different morphs, with the size of spots on the wings of which varies greatly.

== Environmental polymorphism ==
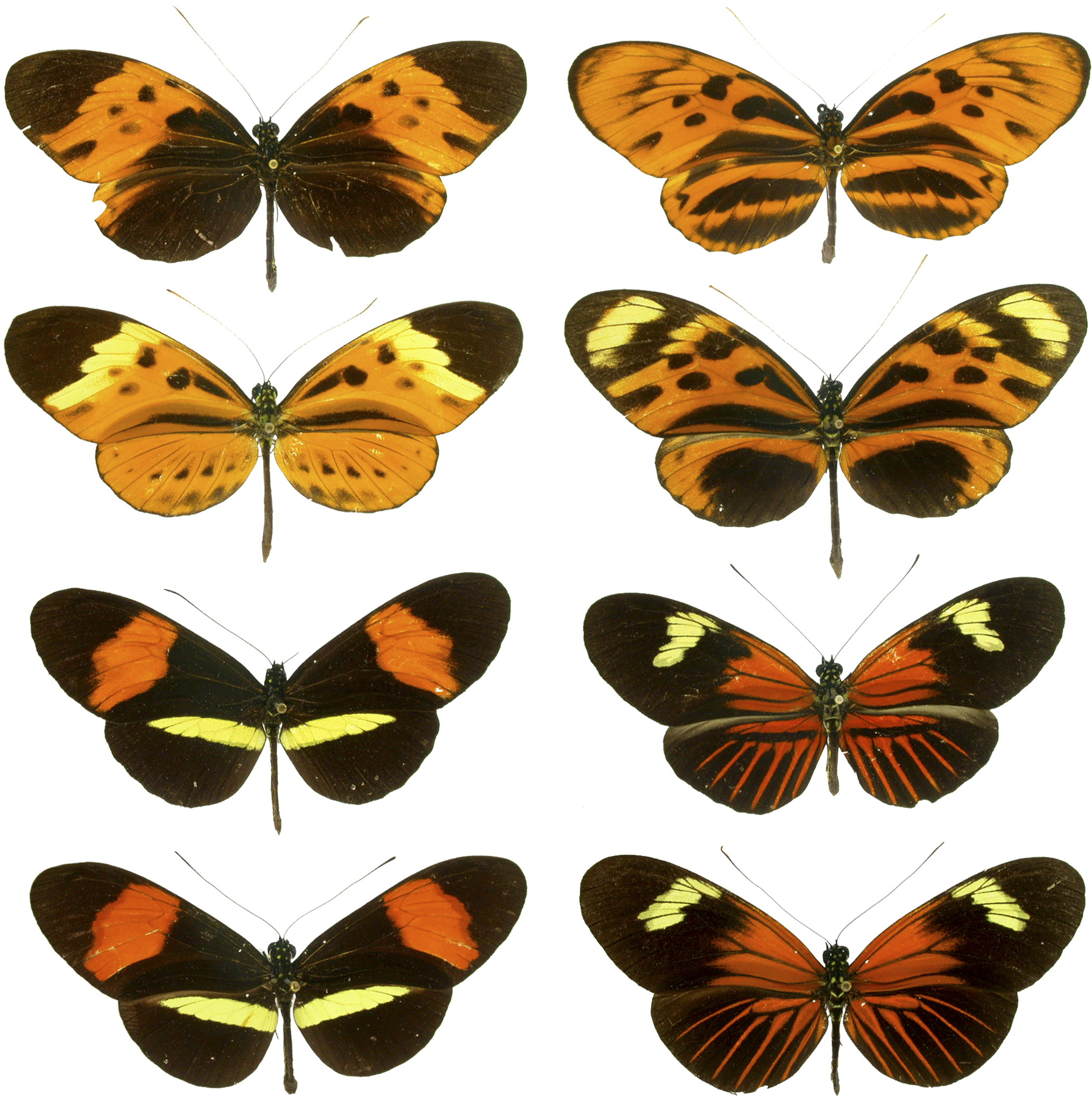
The Heliconius butterflies from the tropics of the Western Hemisphere are the classical model for Müllerian mimicry.

Seasonal polyphenism in Eurema hecabe

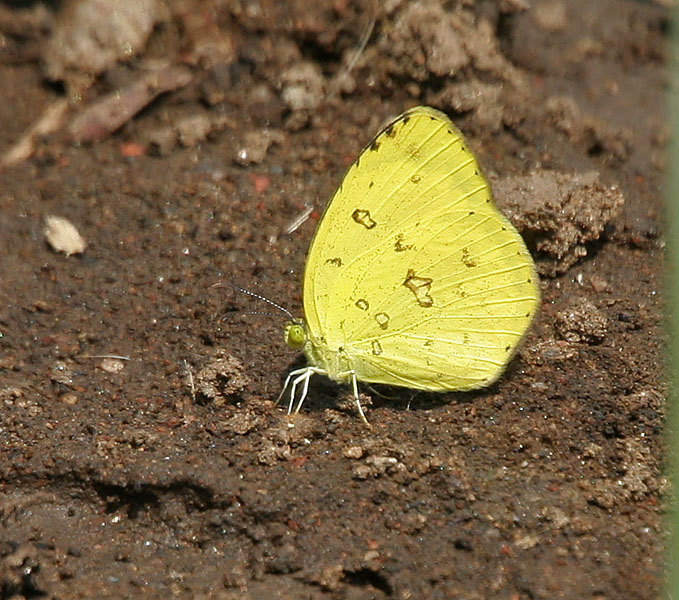
Dry-season form

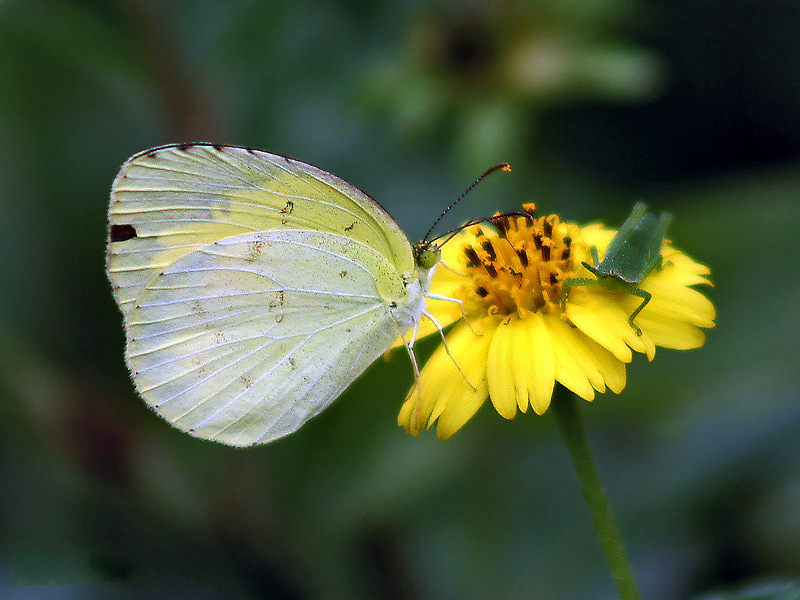
Wet-season form

Environmental polymorphism, where genetic heritability plays no role, is often termed polyphenism. Polyphenism in Lepidoptera is commonly seen in the form of seasonal morphs, especially in the butterfly families of Nymphalidae and Pieridae. An Old World pierid butterfly, the common grass yellow (Eurema hecabe) has a darker summer adult morph, triggered by a long day exceeding 13 hours in duration, while the shorter diurnal period of 12 hours or less induces a paler morph in the post-monsoon period. Polyphenism also occurs in caterpillars, an example being the peppered moth (Biston betularia).

== Mimicry ==
Batesian and Müllerian mimicry complexes are commonly found in Lepidoptera. Genetic polymorphism and natural selection give rise to otherwise edible species (the mimic) gaining a survival advantage by resembling inedible species (the model). Such a mimicry complex is referred to as Batesian and is most commonly known by the mimicry by the limenitidine viceroy butterfly of the inedible danaine monarch. Later research has discovered that the viceroy is, in fact more toxic than the monarch and this resemblance should be considered as a case of Müllerian mimicry.

In Müllerian mimicry, inedible species, usually within a taxonomic order, find it advantageous to resemble each other so as to reduce the sampling rate by predators who need to learn about the insects' inedibility. Taxa from the toxic genus Heliconius form one of the most well known Müllerian complexes. The adults of the various species now resemble each other so well that the species cannot be distinguished without close morphological observation and, in some cases, dissection or genetic analysis.

== See also ==
- Polymorphism (biology)
