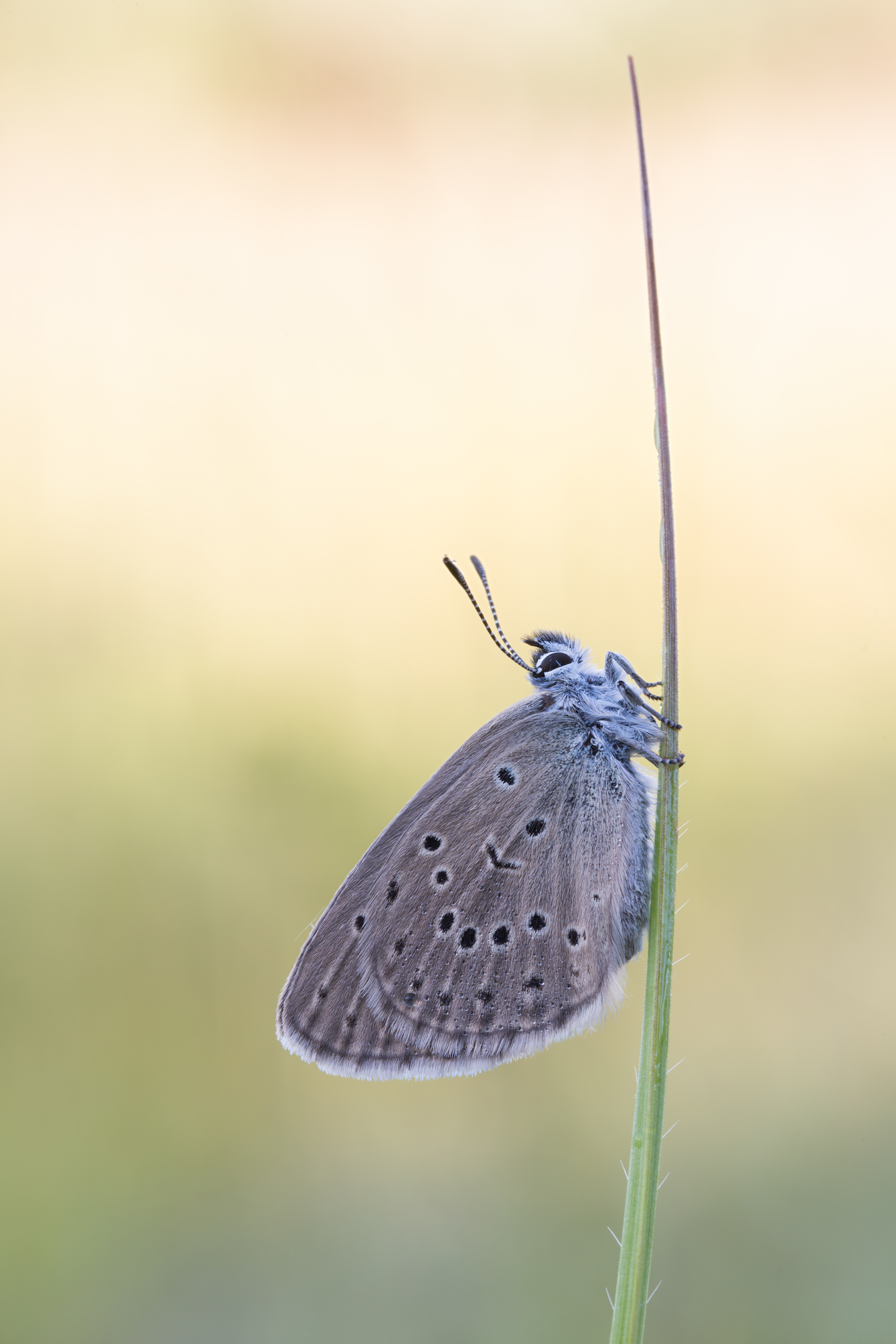

Conservation status
- Vulnerable (IUCN 3.1)

Scientific classification
- Kingdom: Animalia
- Phylum: Arthropoda
- Class: Insecta
- Order: Lepidoptera
- Family: Lycaenidae
- Genus: Phengaris
- Species: P. rebeli

Binomial name
- Phengaris rebeli (Hirschke, 1904)

Synonyms
- Glaucopsyche rebeli; Maculinea rebeli (Hirschke, 1904)

= Phengaris rebeli =

Species of butterfly

Phengaris rebeli (formerly Maculinea rebeli), common name mountain Alcon blue, is a species of butterfly in the family Lycaenidae. It was first found and described in Styria, Austria, on Mount Hochschwab around 1700. Although it was initially classified as a subspecies of P. alcon, a European researcher, Lucien A. Berger, designated it as a separate species in 1946. Genetic similarities between P. rebeli and P. alcon have led many researchers to argue that the two are the same species and differences are due to intraspecific variation.

Although P. rebeli is found across the Palearctic (see subspecies), it is difficult to determine the species' precise range due to confusion with P. alcon.

Behavioral ecologists have found its role as a brood parasite to be of particular interest as, unlike many brood parasites, it does not directly oviposit in the hosts' nests. P. rebeli parasitizes the colony ant species Myrmica schencki as a larva by using chemical mimicry to trick the ants into believing that they are ant larvae; thus, the ants bring P. rebeli caterpillars back to their nests and feed them. P. rebeli is dependent on the plant Gentiana cruciata early in its life cycle and is vulnerable to parasitism by Ichneumon eumerus while inside the nest of M. schencki. It was placed on the IUCN Red List in 2000 and is classified as a species vulnerable to extinction.

== Taxonomy ==
The genus Phengaris was previously considered a subgroup within the genus Maculinea (explaining why P. rebeli was formerly known as M. rebeli) and the Maculinea-Phengaris clade is thought to be a section within Glaucopsyche. There are three groups within this Maculinea-Phengaris clade: the alcon group, the teleius group, and the Arion-Phengaris group.

The groups are divided based on their alternative parasitization strategies of the host ants. The predatory strategy (in which the caterpillar consumes the host ants) and cuckoo strategy (in which the caterpillars feed off of the ants' regurgitation) are derived characteristics from the alcon group, with the predatory strategy having evolved from the teleius group and the cuckoo strategy having evolved from the arion-Phengaris group. Another way these groups are categorized is by whether or not they release a chemical (dorsal nectary organ secretions) to attract the attention of the host ant. This trait is not as prominent in ancestors of the alcon group and in M. nausithous, which is part of the teleius group.

P. rebeli is most closely related to both subspecies of Phengaris alcon (P. alcon alcon and P. alcon kondakovi) with P. alcon alcon being more closely related to P. rebeli than to P. alcon kondakovi.

=== Subspecies ===
- Phengaris rebeli rebeli (Hirschke, 1904) Central and Southern Europe
- Phengaris rebeli cordidula (Jachontov, [1909]) Caucasus Major
- Phengaris rebeli imitator Tuzov, 2000 northern Tian-Shan, Dzungarian Alatau
- Phengaris rebeli kondakovi Kurentzov, 1970 Transbaikalia, Amur Oblast, Ussuri, northeast China
- Phengaris rebeli monticola (Staudinger, 1901) Armenia
- Phengaris rebeli ssp. Altai Mountains

=== Conflicts over classification ===
Several researchers argue that P. rebeli has not evolved into a separate species from Phengaris alcon and that any variation between the two groups is due to intraspecific variation. Both species share a similar adult morphology, DNA and allozymes. Furthermore, they both have similar methods of parasitizing the host ant: they act as parasitic "cuckoos" within the ant nest and feed upon the ants' regurgitation. This is compared to the alternative method of predation used by Maculinea arion.

To test this hypothesis, researchers examined how each species utilized the host ants. M. schencki and M. sabuleti are parasitized by P. rebeli while M. salina and M. vandeli are parasitized by P. alcon. M. scabrinodis is parasitized by both P. rebeli and P. alcon; however, P. alcon is far more likely than P. rebeli to parasitize M. scabrinodis. Researchers found that in general, P. alcon was far more likely to parasitize the host ant than P. rebeli; however, ant nests that supported P. alcon were much smaller and supported lower populations than ant nests that supported P. rebeli.

== Appearance ==
P. rebeli are noted for their large blue wings, with the males displaying a violet blue shade and the females displaying blue basal areas interspersed with brown spots, similar to other butterflies in the genus. The undersides of the wings are a dark brown with small black spots that are circled in white. This species can be distinguished from its close relative, P. alcon, by the broader black margins of the upper-side of wings of males and the extensive blue basal areas of wings of the females. It has a wingspan of approximately 32–36 mm.

== Habitat ==
It resides in fairly dry areas at lower elevations and damp meadows among trees at alpine elevation and is found in altitudes of 1000–2000 meters. Populations of P. rebeli are concentrated in the northern part of Portugal, Croatia and Greece, the western Pyrenees, France, and eastern part of Germany.

== Lifecycle ==
This butterfly begins life as eggs laid on leaves of Gentiana cruciata plants. The caterpillars hatch and feed upon the flowers and developing fruits of the plant. After feeding and growing for four instars, the caterpillars drop to the ground. There, the caterpillar releases chemicals which mimic the larvae of Myrmica ants. If an ant finds the caterpillar, it will carry the caterpillar back to its nest. Once inside the nest, the caterpillar tricks the ants into feeding and caring for it. P. rebeli pupates within the ant nest and crawls out as an adult.

=== Host plant ===
P. rebeli choose where to lay their eggs based on the size of G. cruciata leaves and not upon the location of the closest Myrmica ant colony. This fact is supported by the timing of its oviposition. P. rebeli lays their eggs during the warm summer season, when Myrmica ants are most likely to be underground. Researchers also observed females did not base their oviposition on where they found Myrmica nests.

Larger populations of G. cruciata are associated with higher production of flowers and seeds, but also with an increased frequency of P. rebeli feeding upon the plant. Researchers are particularly interested in the G. cruciata plant because both P. rebeli and G. cruciata are endangered. Lepidopterists have suggested that conservation of P. rebeli requires focus on conservation of G. cruciata.

=== Parasitism of ants ===
==== Discovery ====
Phengaris rebeli is a brood parasite, an organism that manipulates another organism (the host) to raise its offspring; in this case, the P. rebeli parasitizes a particular species of ant, the Myrmica schencki. The P. rebeli was first discovered to be a brood parasite when a researcher observed M. schencki ants bringing the P. rebeli larvae back to their own nest. One of the proposed hypotheses for this parasitism was that P. rebeli larvae released chemicals to confuse the ants into believing they were ant larvae.

It was determined that P. rebeli larvae use chemical mimicry to persuade the M. schencki ants that they are part of the ant brood. Furthermore, M. schencki ants cannot distinguish the physical differences between the P. rebeli larvae and other non-kin brood because the P. rebeli larvae are far more similar to the M. schencki's larvae than to any other ant species larvae.

P. rebeli live in different habitats; therefore, they do not parasitize the same Myrmica ant species. Through observation and experimentation, researchers found that if P. rebeli try to parasitize a different Myrmica ant species than the one they normally do, the Myrmica ants will identify the P. rebeli larvae as intruders and will kill 100% of the P. rebeli larvae. The differences between the P. rebeli are that they synthesize different hydrocarbons, which allow them to mimic different species of Myrmica ants. This explains why they have no success in being mistaken for another species of Myrmica ant and the ensuing 100% mortality rate when the other Myrmica ant species is not fooled.

==== Acoustics and social rank in host hierarchy ====
Once P. rebeli larvae infiltrate the host's brood, they ascend to the highest social ranks of the host's hierarchy by using acoustics to achieve social acceptance from worker M. schencki ants. P. rebeli larvae and pupa accomplish this by mimicking the sound that the queen of the ant colony makes, both while as a larva and as a pupa in the colony.

While Myrmica ant colony members can identify each other through chemical signaling, social ranks are partially determined by sound acoustics. Therefore, once the P. rebeli begin to mimic the sound of the queen ant, the worker ants begin to treat the P. rebeli as if it were the queen ant. On the other hand, the queen ant treats the P. rebeli larvae and pupae as if they were rivals, as she is the only one in the colony that recognizes that the P. rebeli larvae are not ant larvae.

The most common functions of the queen ant sounds are to recruit workers, smell nestmates, and facilitate oral exchanges of food and pheromones. Most importantly, however, is the fact that distress noises made by the queen causes workers to raise their guard and bolster her protection.

Researchers speculate that acoustical mimicry is related to the level of interaction between the host and parasite. In the genus Phengaris, there are two different strategies: the cuckoo strategy used by P. rebeli and the predatory strategy used by Phengaris arion. In P. rebeli, the Phengaris larvae become integrated into the colony and are attended by worker ants. However, larvae in predatory species prey on the ants' brood and consequently spend much of their life hiding in pockets of the brood nest.

==== Integration into host's life ====
There are two phases in the integration of P. rebeli into a Myrmica schencki ant colony: initial integration and full integration. In both stages, a P. rebeli caterpillar is brought into the brood nest; however, in full integration, P. rebeli also achieves its high social status within the host society. That status is crucial for surviving periods of host colony stress such as food shortage.

Studies have shown that P. rebeli caterpillars benefit more when they parasitize a Myrmica schencki ant colony than a colony of any other ant species. When Myrmica ant colonies encounter a period of food shortage, more P. rebeli caterpillars survive than if this food shortage were to occur in colonies of other species. This is because the P. rebeli caterpillars have a lower social rank in other ant species compared to their social rank in the M. schencki ant colony. This phenomenon is seen during times of stress, when some of the hungry P. rebeli caterpillars secrete compounds to attract attention from the ant colony it has parasitized. While the M. schencki ants are still fooled into believing that the P. rebeli are of their own brood, these compounds do not mimic those of non-host species' societies in other ant species, and thus, results in the P. rebeli being identified as intruders and killed.

On the other hand, M. schencki prefers to feed P. rebeli during times of food shortage. Thus, in periods of starvation, P. rebeli caterpillars overall exhibit a higher survival rate than those of the M. schencki larvae.

==== Polymorphism of growth in larvae ====
Many butterflies are polymorphic. P. rebeli caterpillars are polymorphic, having two strategies for living and growing underground: to exist as fast-developing larvae (FDL) or slow-developing larvae (SDL). After the ant brood adopts the FDL, which comprise approximately 25% of the total P. rebeli larvae, the FDL complete growth the following spring and eclose (emerge as an adult from the pupa) in early summer to complete their life cycle. The SDL, which comprise 75% of P. rebeli larvae, do not grow much during the first year, but grow rapidly during the early part of the second summer and remain a second winter within the ant colonies. While both larva types ultimately form similar-sized pupae, their polymorphic growth rates could indicate alternative fitness strategies and different ways to exploit the M. schencki's food resources.

Other researchers hypothesize that another alternative growth strategy will evolve in the P. rebeli, in which the P. rebeli will parasitize the M. schencki ants for an even longer period of time than the slow developing larvae. Most researchers, however, find this hypothesis highly unlikely because it is not an evolutionarily stable strategy. At the rate the P. rebeli parasitizes the M. schencki ants, the host colony is unlikely to last as a viable food source for more than two years (the average lifespan of the longer polymorph of P. rebeli). Once the host colony reaches its lifespan of two years and dies, the P. rebeli loses its food source and dies as well.

P. rebeli's developmental rate shows great phenotypic plasticity (changing its developmental rate in response to changes in the environment), as it develops very quickly in the lab and in the Pyrenees and Southern Alps. Scientists hypothesize that this plasticity is due to warm conditions and more light exposure, which affects larval development. Abundant food resources are also thought to play a part in quickened development.

Studies have shown that smaller-sized P. rebeli from Hungary normally eclose at the end of June or mid-July; however, when these populations are studied in laboratories, they do not eclose until late August. This has led researchers to speculate that P. rebeli larvae that do not receive adequate food can still fully develop in one year and act as a functioning adult. However, they are unlikely to be bivoltine (producing two broods in one season). This hypothesis is supported by the fact that certain researchers claim that P. rebeli larvae can have continuous development.

==== Vestigial mutualism ====
The parasitic relationship between P. rebeli caterpillars and their ant hosts is thought to have evolved from a mutualistic relationship. P. rebeli larvae prey upon ant brood while producing sugar-rich secretions which worker ants imbibe. In an experiment, P. rebeli individuals which consumed ant larvae developed more quickly than those who did not. In addition, despite their nourishing offering to the ant colony, they invariably imposed a net loss in the survival rates of workers and brood, demonstrating that the species is parasitic (rather than mutualistic) at all stages in its host colony.

== Relationship with the parasitic wasp, Ichneumon eumerus ==
Though P. rebeli is a parasite, it acts itself as a host to the parasitoid ichneumon wasp, Ichneumon eumerus. I. eumerus attempts to parasitize P. rebeli caterpillars within a Myrmica nest. The adult wasp searches for Myrmica ant nests by sense of smell, and responds strongly only to nests containing P. rebeli which it most commonly and successfully parasitizes.

After locating an M. schnecki nest, the wasp enters only if it contains P. rebeli caterpillars. It is able to enter the nest without being swarmed by releasing a chemical which causes the worker ants to attack one another instead of concentrating their efforts on the wasp. Once the wasp reaches the caterpillars, it oviposits an egg in them. Once the wasp's eggs hatch, the larvae feed on the caterpillar, eventually killing it.

== Conservation status ==
P. rebeli has been rigorously studied in Europe because it has priority conservation status and was classified as "vulnerable" in 2000 by the IUCN Red List of Threatened Species. It was first brought to the IUCN's attention and listed on the IUCN Red List of Threatened Species in 1986. The species was categorized as "vulnerable" because its population decreased by 20-50% in the last 25 years and has been extirpated from at least one country.

The causes of this drastic population reduction are thought to be agricultural land use changes, abandonment of extensive management, and deforestation. As the habitat of the food plant Gentiana cruciata decreases, P. rebeli population also decreases.

== Gallery ==
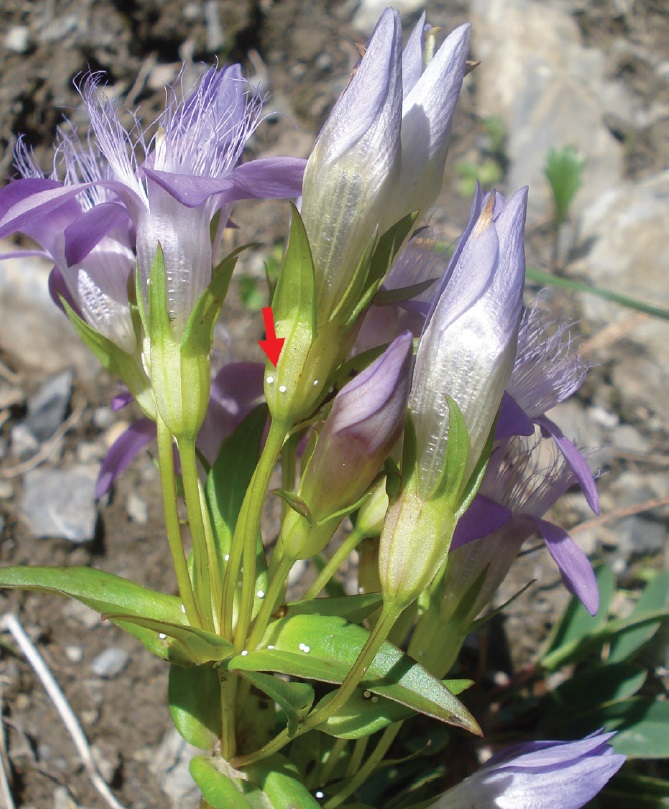
Eggs on host plant

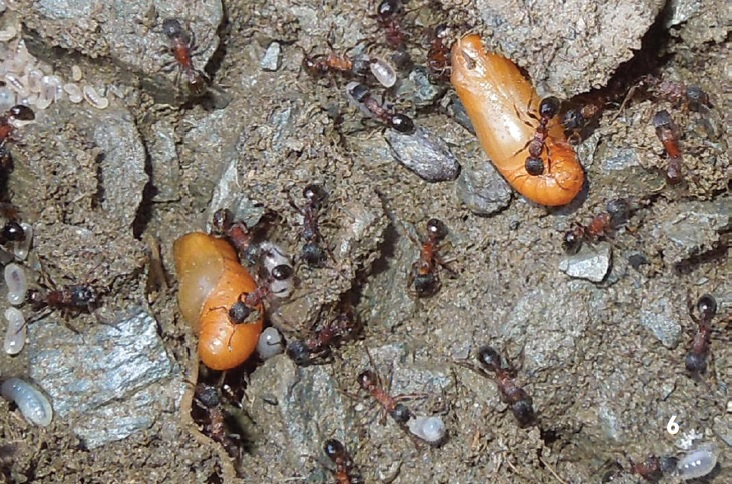
Pupae in ant nest
