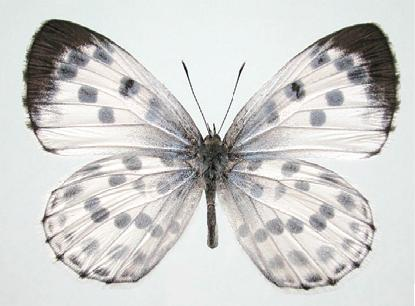
- Upperside
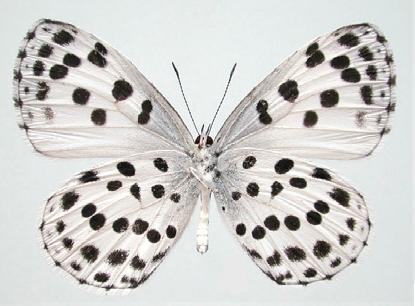
- Underside

Scientific classification
- Kingdom: Animalia
- Phylum: Arthropoda
- Clade: Pancrustacea
- Class: Insecta
- Order: Lepidoptera
- Family: Lycaenidae
- Genus: Phengaris
- Species: P. albida

Binomial name
- Phengaris albida Leech, 1893

Synonyms
- Phengaris intermedia Oberthür, 1916

= Phengaris albida =

Species of butterfly

Phengaris albida is a species of butterfly of the family Lycaenidae. It is only known from western China.
