= Ichneumon eumerus =

Scientific classification
- Domain: Eukaryota
- Kingdom: Animalia
- Phylum: Arthropoda
- Class: Insecta
- Order: Hymenoptera
- Family: Ichneumonidae
- Genus: Ichneumon
- Species: I. eumerus

Binomial name
- Ichneumon eumerus Wesmael, 1857

Synonyms
- Ichneumon rarus Tischbein, 1873

Species of wasp

Ichneumon eumerus is a species of parasitic wasp belonging to the family Ichneumonidae, subfamily Ichneumoninae. It is a specialist parasite of the larva of the mountain Alcon blue butterfly (Phengaris rebeli).

== Life cycle ==
The life cycle of I. eumerus is dependent on a butterfly, the mountain Alcon blue (Phengaris rebeli), the larvae of which trick ants in the species Myrmica schencki into carrying the larvae into their nest and caring for them as if they were ant larvae. The adult female wasp seeks out a nest of these ants; it seems to be able to tell by smell whether there are larvae of the butterfly present in the nest and if there are, it attempts to enter. The ants attack the intruder, but the wasp produces a pheromone that causes the ants to become confused and attack each other. This gives the wasp the chance to search out the butterfly larvae and lay an egg in each one. Afterwards the ants continue to feed and look after the butterfly larvae which in due course pupate. The wasp eggs hatch and the wasp larvae feed on the butterfly larvae from the inside, eventually pupating inside the butterfly pupae.

== Status ==
The mountain Alcon blue butterfly is a rare species which is known from the northern part of Portugal, the western Pyrenees, France, Switzerland, part of Germany and Greece at altitudes between 1,000 and 2,000 m (3,300 and 6,600 ft). The butterfly is considered to be a "vulnerable species", and the wasp, being entirely dependent on the butterfly, would become extinct if the butterfly were to die out.
