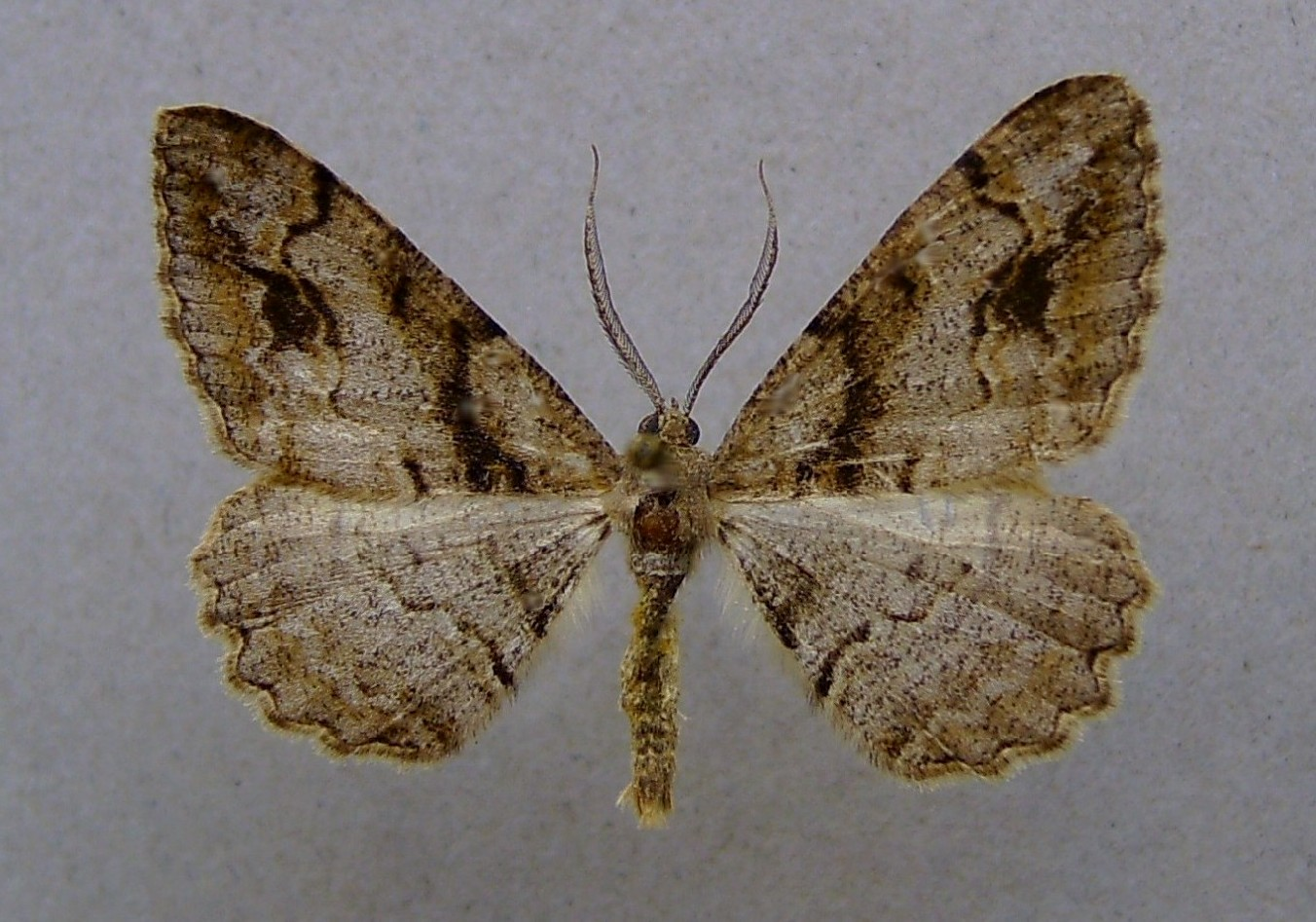
- Mounted male
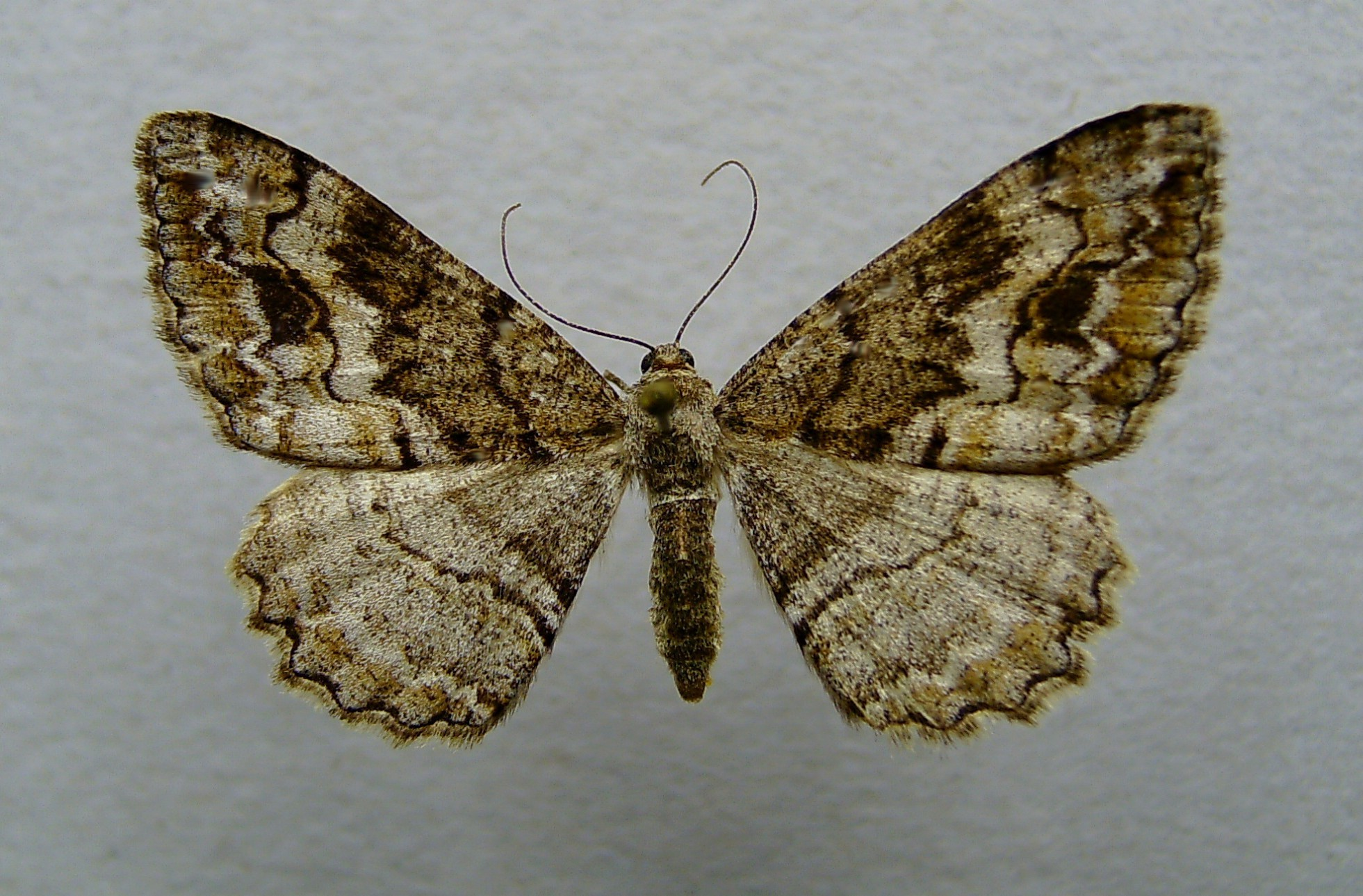
- Mounted female

Scientific classification
- Kingdom: Animalia
- Phylum: Arthropoda
- Class: Insecta
- Order: Lepidoptera
- Family: Geometridae
- Subfamily: Ennominae
- Tribe: Boarmiini
- Genus: Alcis
- Species: A. bastelbergeri

Binomial name
- Alcis bastelbergeri (Hirschke, 1908)

Synonyms
- Boarmia bastelbergeri Hirschke, 1908; Alcis maculata Staudinger, 1892, nec Moore, 1868

= Alcis bastelbergeri =

Species of moth

Alcis bastelbergeri is a moth of the family Geometridae. It is found from Central Europe, through the Ural region to the eastern Palearctic, where subspecies sachalinensis is found.

The wingspan is 38–43 mm. Adults are on wing from July to September.

The larvae feed on a wide range of plants, including Vaccinium myrtillus, Clematis vitalba, Rubus idaeus, Erica and Betula species. Adults feed on the nectar of Knautia, Senecio ovatus and Eupatorium cannabinum.

== Subspecies ==
- Alcis bastelbergeri bastelbergeri
- Alcis bastelbergeri sachaliensis (Matsumura, 1911)

== Etymology ==
It is named for the German entomologist Max Joseph Bastelberger.
