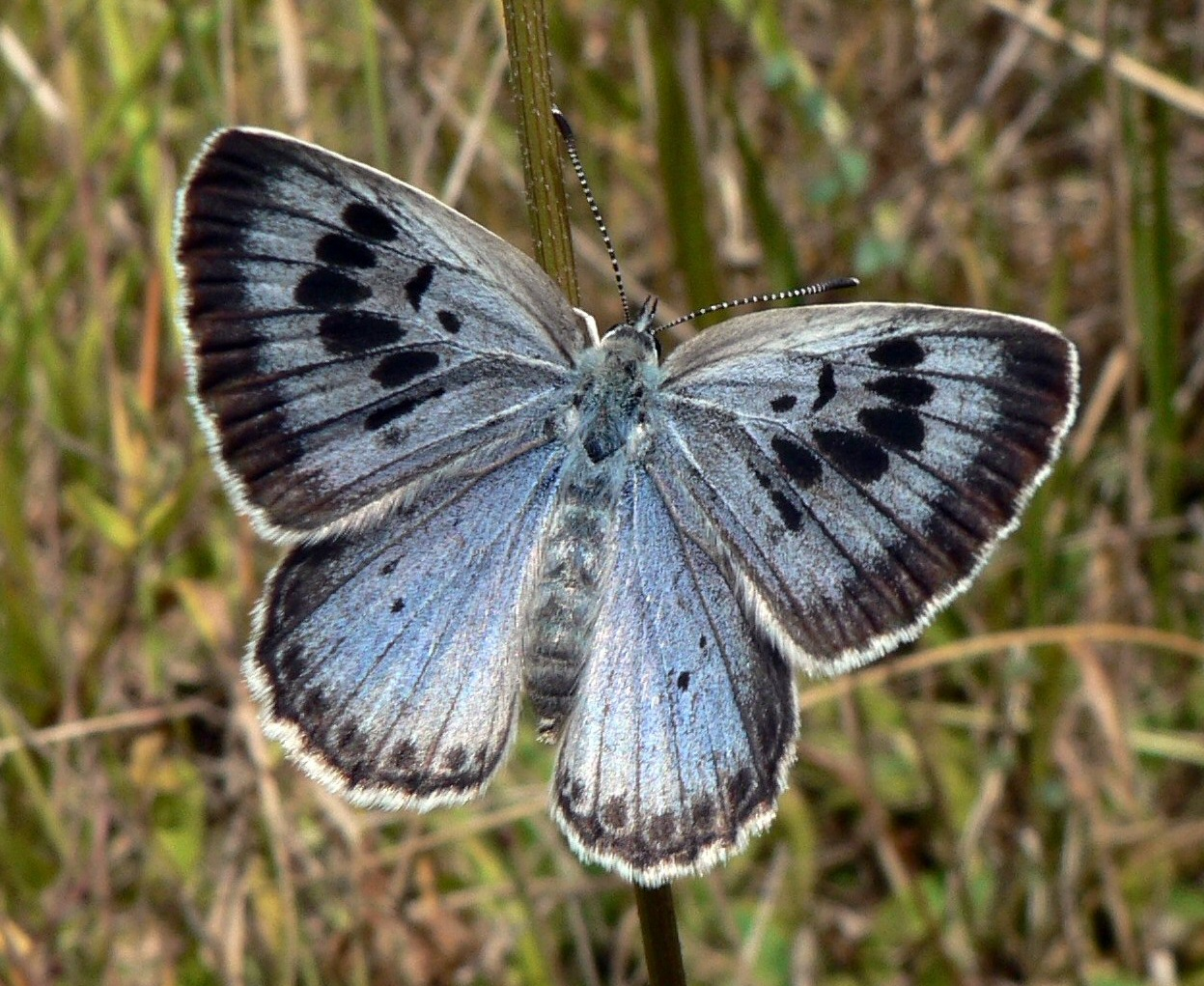
- Upperside
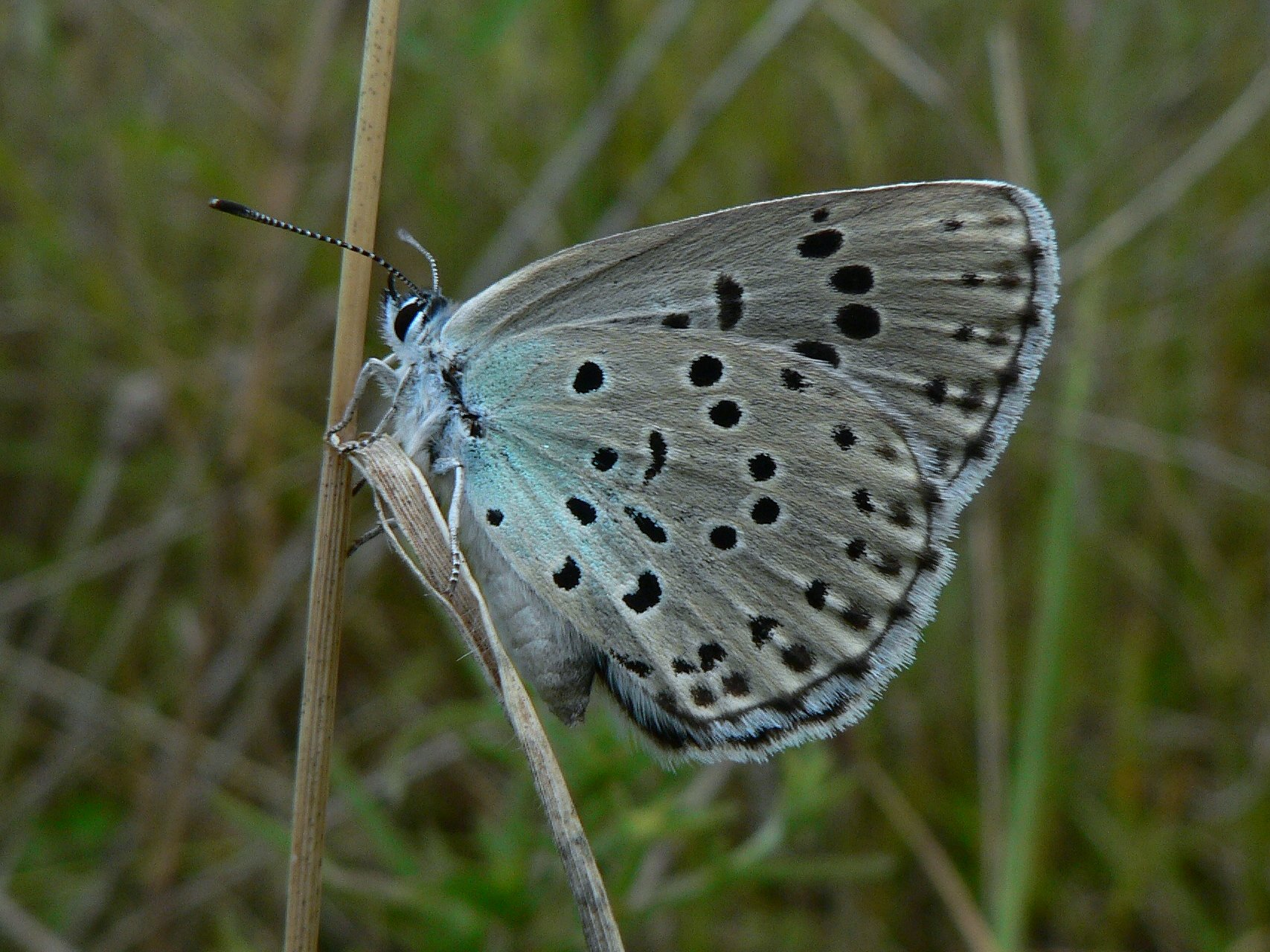
- Underside

Conservation status
- Near Threatened (IUCN 2.3)

- Near Threatened (IUCN 3.1)

Scientific classification
- Kingdom: Animalia
- Phylum: Arthropoda
- Clade: Pancrustacea
- Class: Insecta
- Order: Lepidoptera
- Family: Lycaenidae
- Genus: Phengaris
- Species: P. arion

Binomial name
- Phengaris arion (Linnaeus, 1758)
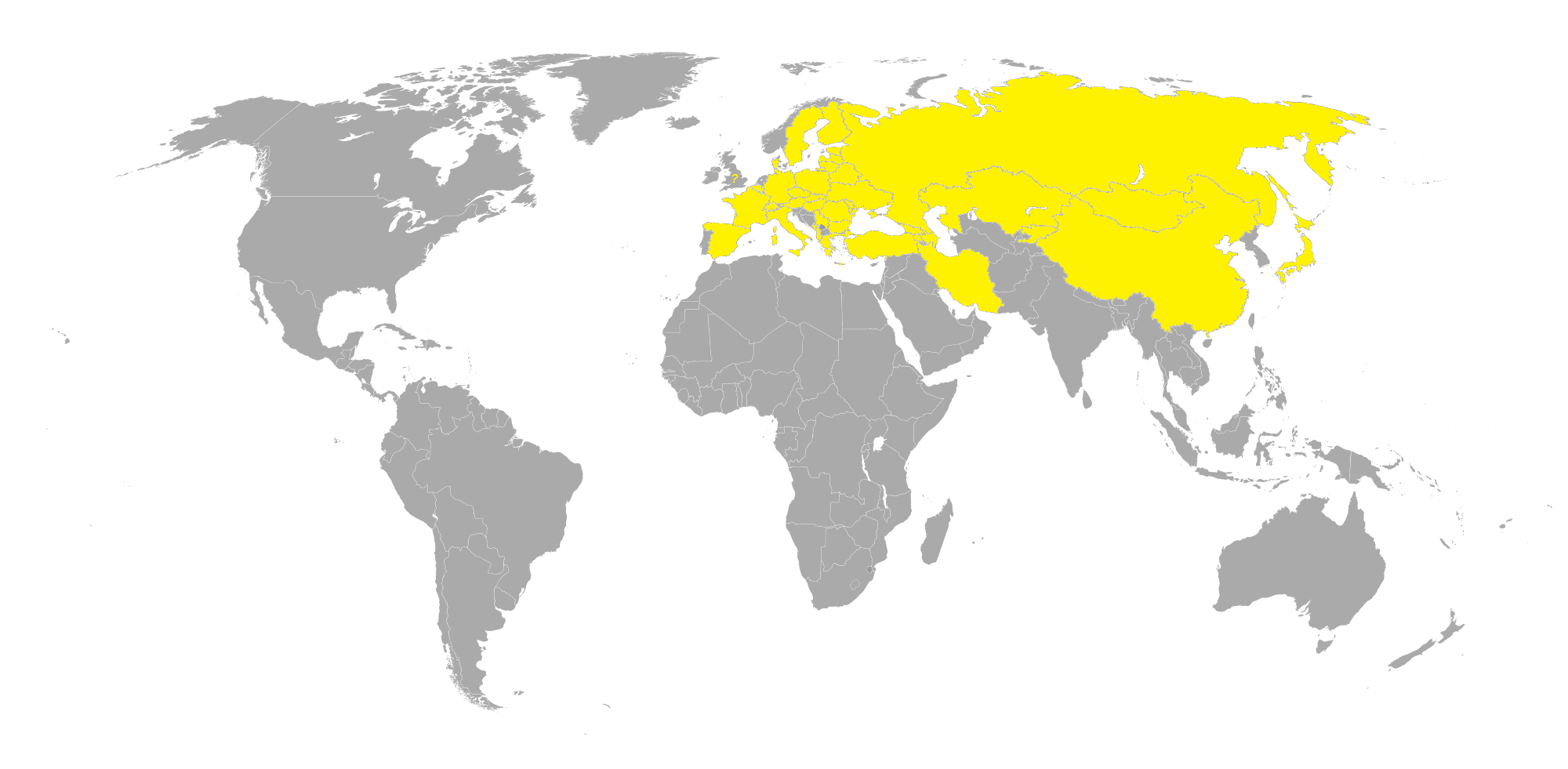

Synonyms
- Papilio arion Linnaeus, 1758; Glaucopsyche arion (Linnaeus, 1758); Maculinea arion (Linnaeus, 1758); Nomiades arion

= Large blue =

Species of butterfly

The Large blue (Phengaris arion) is a species of butterfly in the family Lycaenidae. The species was first defined in 1758 and first recorded in Britain in 1795. In 1979 the species became mostly extinct in Britain but has been successfully reintroduced with new conservation methods. The species is classified as "near threatened" on the IUCN Red List of Threatened Species. Today P. arion can be found in Europe, the Caucasus, Armenia, western Siberia, Altai, north-western Kazakhstan and Sichuan.

The large blue can be distinguished by its unique speckled black dots on its wings with a blue background.

The large blue butterfly is well known in behavioural ecology as it is a brood parasite of a single species of red ant, Myrmica sabuleti. The discovery was made by Captain Edward Bagwell Purefoy along with F. W. Frohawk and others.

== Subspecies ==
- P. a. arion Mainland Europe, western Siberia, Altai, north-western Kazakhstan
- P. a. delphinatus (Fruhstorfer, 1910)
- P. a. zara (Jachontov, 1935) Caucasus, Armenia
- P. a. buholzeri (Rezbanyai, 1978)
- † P. a. eutyphron (Fruhstorfer, 1915) formerly southern Britain

== Description ==
Large blue caterpillars grow to about half an inch (13 millimetres) in length, and spend up to 9 months before they undergo metamorphosis to a chrysalis to become a butterfly. Large blue butterflies are one of the largest in the family Lycaenidae, known as the gossamer-winged butterfly, with a wingspan of up to 2 inches (51 millimetres), and live only for a few weeks. The wings of the large blue butterfly are speckled with black dots.

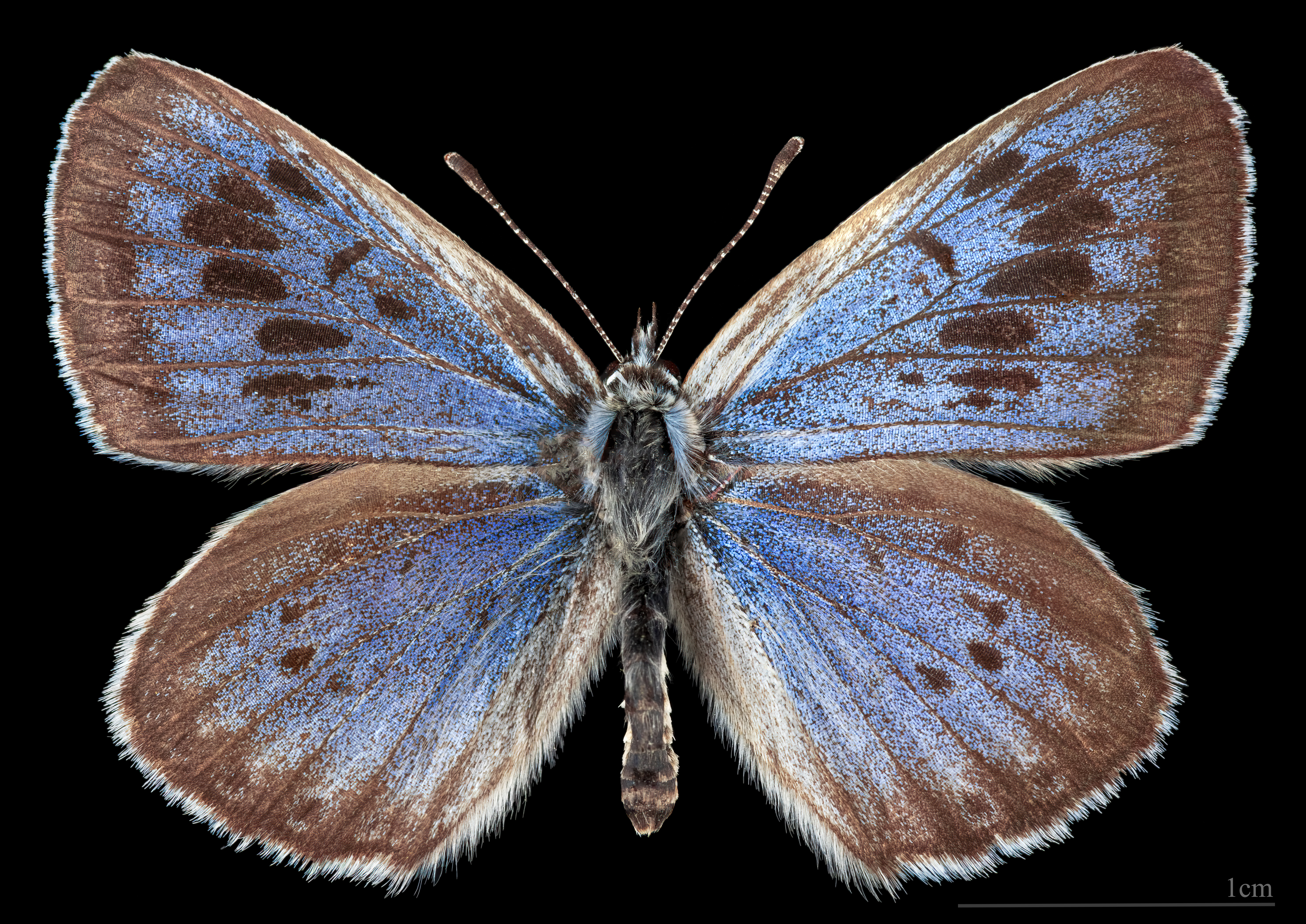
Phengaris arion ♂

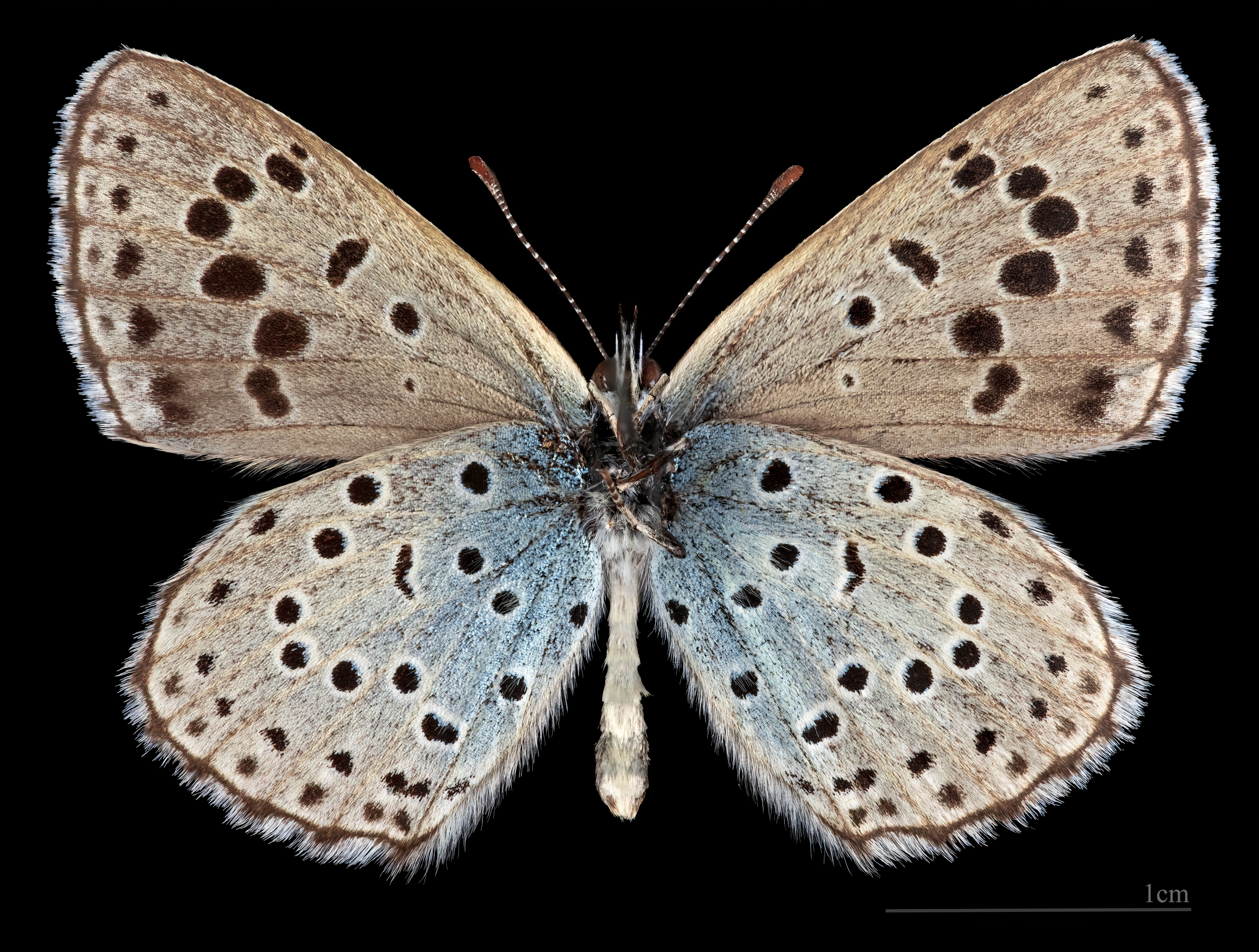
Phengaris arion ♂ △

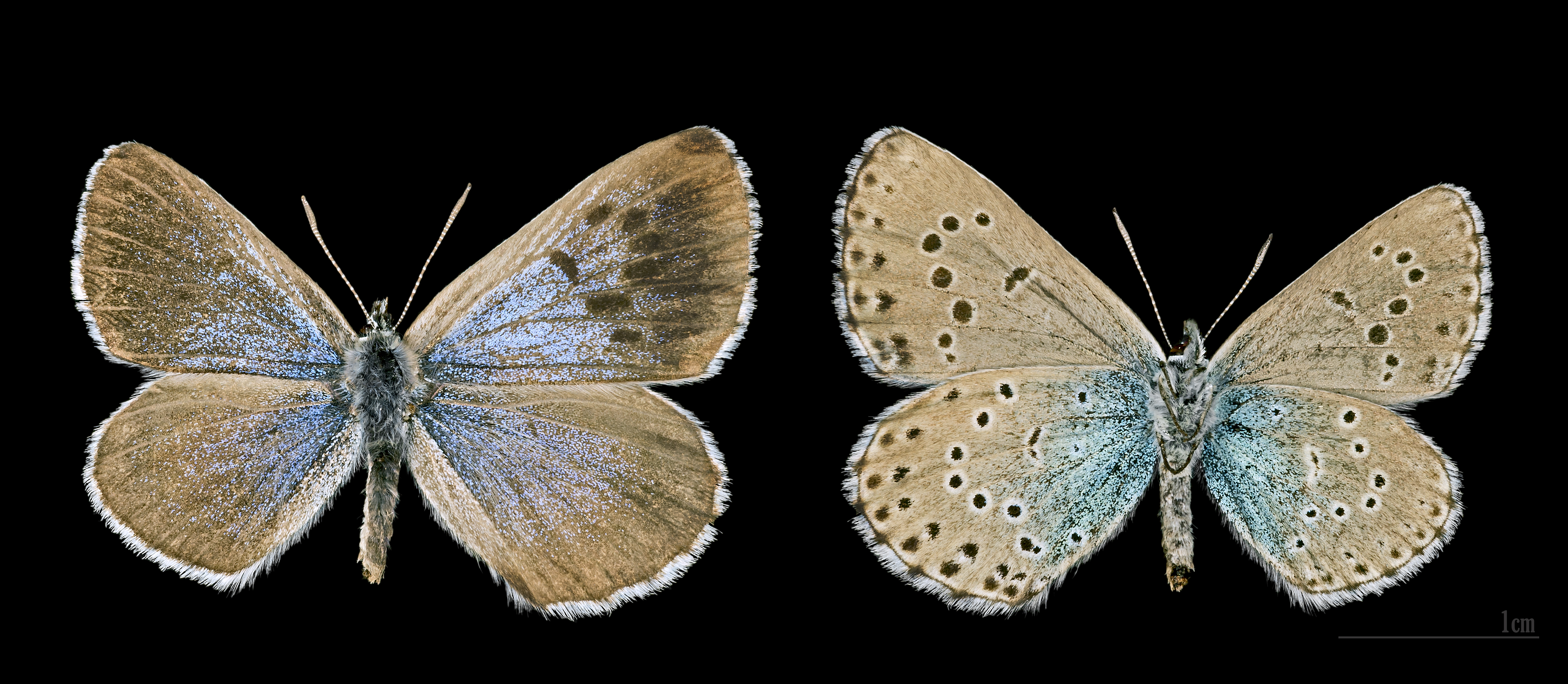
Gynandromorph

== Description by Seitz ==
L. arion L. (83 c). Larger, above of a lighter and more shining blue [than arcas], with a row of black spots across both wings, the spots being sometimes obsolete only on the hindwing of the male. At once recognized by the large number of ocelli on the underside, especially on the hindwing, and by the bright blue dusting of the base beneath. Europe and Anterior Asia, from North Europe, the Baltic provinces, and England to the Mediterranean (Corsica), and from Spain to Armenia and South Siberia. In ab. unicolor Hormuz. the upperside is entirely blue, all the black spots with the exception of the discocellular one being absent. ab. Arthurus Melvill is without ocelli beneath. In ab. jasilkowskii Hornuz the ocelli are absent beneath in the cell as in euphemus, from which this aberration is at once distinguished by its blue-green basal scaling on the underside. In ab. coalescens Gillm. the black spots of the upperside are confluent. — Quite a number of local forms have been separated Northern specimens, which are feebly spotted, are named alconides by Aurivillius. — obscura Christ. (83 c) is an alpine form in which the whole outer half of the wings above is black or dark brown; it occurs typically in the High Alps, being locally very plentiful, e. g. at Bergun, Zermatt, Stilvio and at many places in the Alpes Maritimes. This darkened form occurs also in the Ural (= ruehli Krulik.) — In the South two aberrant forms have been found, namely ligurica Wagn., at the Eiviera between San Remo and Bordighera, with a conspicuous row of white marginal ocelli on the upperside of the hindwing, and aldrovandus S. L., from the Vesuvius, the underside darkened with brown. — cyanecula Stgr. [ now species Phengaris cyanecula (Eversmann, 1848)] (83 d) is an Asiatic form, from the Caucasus to Mongolia, with the metallic blue green dusting of the hindwing beneath being abundant, bright, and extending almost to the distal edge. — Egg very flat semiglobular, pale bluish white, deposited on Thymus which just begins to flower. Larva adult pale ochreous, with a pale lilac tinge at the sides; head ochreous, marked with black anteriorly; prothoracic plate black; feeds until the autumn on Thyme, then disappears and is found full grown the next June in the nests of ants. It is therefore suggested that the ants feed it up (Frohawk) and perhaps also protect the pupae. The chrysalis the colour of amber except for the wing-cases, smooth, somewhat elongate, without web. The butterflies occur usually singly, being locally frequent on open ground, on broad roads through shrubby woods, flying about 1 m above the ground. They rest with closed wings, particularly on Thymes and Scabious. On the wing from the end of June into August.

== Distribution ==
The large blue butterfly is found from coast to coast of the Palearctic realm, but is most concentrated in the areas from France to China.

=== Habitat ===
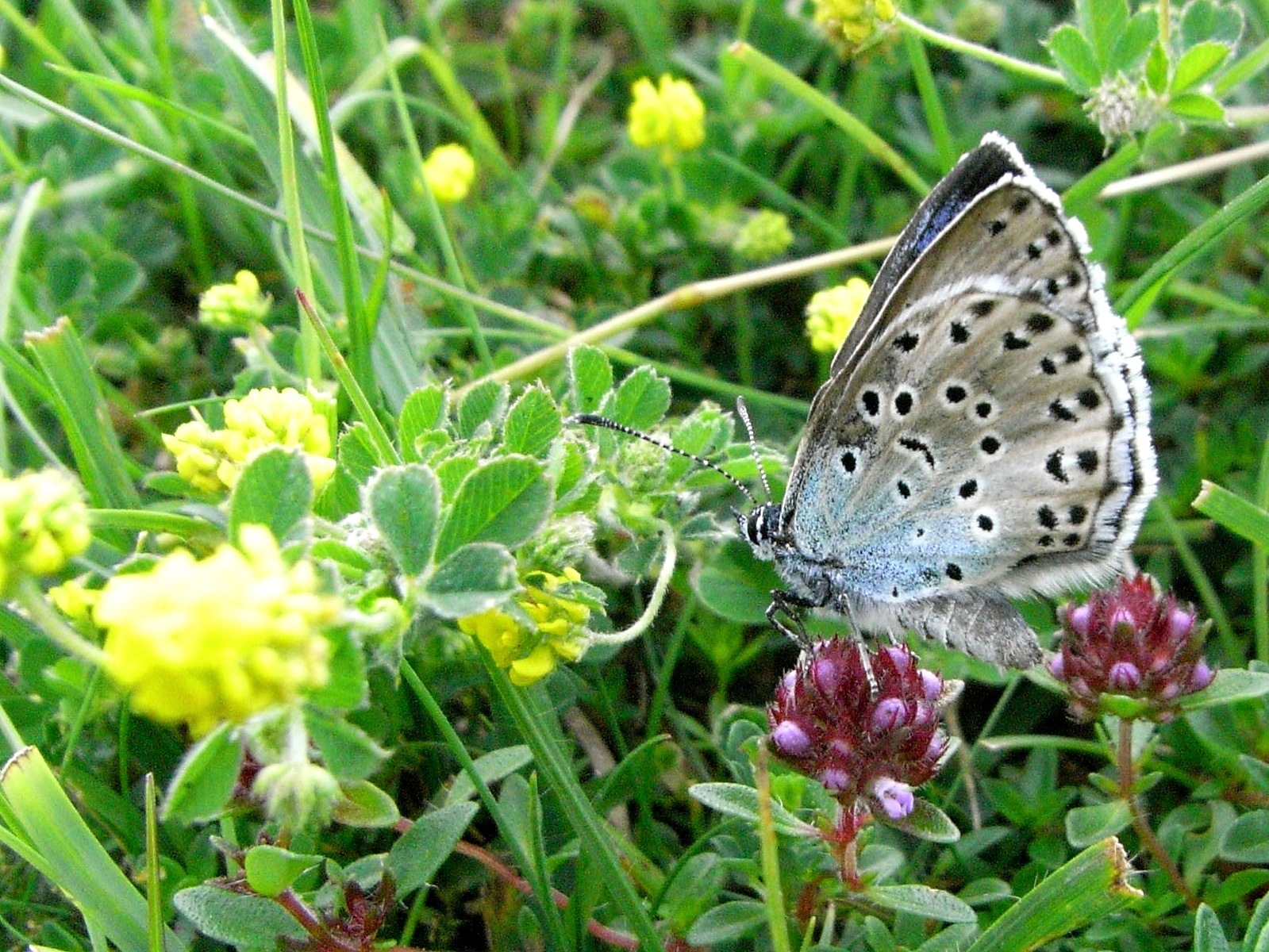
A large blue on Thymus praecox

A large blue on food plant, grooming itself and taking to the air. Underside of wings shown plus partial reveal of upperside.

The habitat of the large blue butterfly is largely influenced by location of its food sources. The species requires a combination of abundant amounts of its larval food plant, Thymus drucei and the presence of Myrmica sabuleti ants in order to survive.

It has also been found that an underlying key factor for the survival of the large blue is site heterogeneity. The butterfly is most abundant in pastures and abandoned areas of diverse vegetation and shrubbery. This preference can be explained by examining the result of a uniform landscape. A constant landscape synchronizes many biological activities including flowering of host plants, adult emergence dates, or larval pressures on the ant colonies. If important biological functions take place at the same times, the population becomes much more susceptible to random unfortunate events such as environmental disasters. Thus traditional farming acts to desynchronize the biological system, and allows for re-colonization of patches that are temporarily untouched. The presence of differing sites and varied ecological structures provides differing microclimates that can make a huge impact on the survival of the large blue butterfly.

=== Extinction/conservation ===
In the late 1900s, Phengaris populations began decreasing drastically throughout Europe with the large blue butterfly being particularly affected. By the 1950s, only an estimated 100,000 adults remained in Britain, and by 1978, 48% of the UK's 91 known large blue populations had been lost. Initially experts were completely baffled by the disappearance of large blues as the sites did not appear to have changed. Leading hypotheses targeted collectors, insecticides, and air pollution as factors that led to the butterfly extinction. A large number of projects were conducted to combat these factors, but all were completely unsuccessful. The species became extinct in the Netherlands in 1964, in the UK in 1979. In Belgium, it had been considered extinct until 1996, when a recolonized population was discovered in the south of the country. Severe decreases in population have also occurred in Denmark, Germany, France, and Estonia. Because of this decline they are being protected. The succession of extinctions and decreases in population has been characterized as a result of unsuccessful conservation efforts that stemmed from a lack of understanding of the behaviour of the butterfly.

Currently the large blue butterfly is classified as critically endangered in Britain as well as being endangered in many areas of Europe. It is a priority species of under the UK Biodiversity Action Plan. However, a long-term conservation project in the UK, led by the Royal Entomological Society, led to a significant increase in numbers in 2022, with the species described as "thriving".

Recent findings have also shown that there is a positive correlation between large blue butterfly conservation success and that of other endangered species. One specific example is the relationship between Myrmica ants, the large blue butterfly, violet seeds, and the violet-feeding butterfly (Boloria euphrosyne). The ants will bring the violet seeds into the nest. The seeds will often germinate in the nest, and their potential for germination increases as the nest becomes deserted. Since large blue butterfly predation of ant larvae can lead to desertion of the nest and B. euphrosyne tend to prefer violets growing on deserted ant nests, the fitness of B. euphrosyne appears to be indirectly affected by the presence of the large blue.

== Behaviour ==
=== Brood parasitism ===
Like many members of the genus Phengaris, large blues are brood parasites, relying on another insect to raise their young. In this case, the hosts are species of Myrmica ant. By being physically and chemically similar to Myrmica ants in their larval stage, and possibly by using other forms of mimicry, Phengaris caterpillars trick the ants into taking them back to the ant nest. Once there, the caterpillar will either become a predator of the ant larvae, or beg for food by acting like an ant larva in what is known as a "cuckoo" strategy. The "cuckoo" method is viewed as a more successful strategy, as studies have consistently found more larvae per nest for cuckoo butterfly species than predator butterflies. Through much research, it has been well documented that large blue butterflies act as predators in the host nests.

==== Host species ====
Early ideas of the Phengaris-Myrmica relationship resulted in the construction of a linear relationship between one predator and one host. It was proposed that each species of Phengaris had evolutionarily adapted to prey on one specific species of Myrmica with the large blue focusing on M. sabuleti. More recent reports indicate that while each Phengaris species can prey on more than one Myrmica species, that ability varies between species and each butterfly species still prefers a specific ant species. The large blue has also been documented to prey on M. scabrinodis. Additional studies have also shown that the large blue may exhibit different host preferences depending on location. For example, in Finland, large blue butterflies exclusively fed off M. lonae nests and in Poland they were found in the nests of M. rugulosa, M. hellenica, and M. schencki.

==== Egg laying ====
Since the parasitic-host relationship between the large blue and the Myrmica is essential for the caterpillar survival, female butterflies must lay eggs in areas where the larvae can be found by ant workers of the correct species. In the past it was unclear if Phengaris butterflies were capable of identifying areas of specific Myrmica species. It was believed that the certain species of Phengaris could detect specific odours to identify Myrmica species. It was also thought that certain species of Phengaris were capable of avoiding overcrowding on food plants by detecting high egg loads. New studies indicate that female egg laying is merely attuned to the Myrmica species, and that females do not take other factors into consideration. Female Phengaris lay eggs on specific plants such as thyme.

==== Larva/caterpillar stage ====
After about three weeks, larvae hatch to feed on the seeds and flowers of the plant. Multiple larvae cannibilise each other until only one caterpillar remains. The caterpillar will stay in the vicinity of its food plant until its 4th instar, when it will drop to the ground. From there the caterpillar will adopt various strategies to be found by Myrmica ants. Large blue caterpillars will sometimes follow ant trails or move away from the food plant during peak-foraging time to expose themselves specifically to Myrmica and not other ants. Several caterpillar species of Phengaris, such as P. rebeli and P. alcon, will secrete pheromones that are specific to their respective hosts. The purpose of such behaviour is to mimic the pheromones of ant larvae that will become workers in the future. By successfully mimicking ant larvae, the caterpillars are taken back to the host nest and fed by the ants. Originally it was thought that the large blue butterfly behaved differently in that some believed it either secreted a poor pheromone mimic, or did not secrete one at all. This was inferred from the fact that worker ants tended to neglect the caterpillars once in the nest. Today it has been determined that it still secretes semiochemicals as a form of chemical mimicry to gain acceptance into the host ant nest.

==== Behaviour in the host nest ====
===== "Cuckoo" strategy =====
While most Phengaris caterpillars behave similarly before entering the host ant nest, once adopted into a nest the larvae adopt one of two strategies. The first is the "cuckoo" strategy. This has been studied extensively in P. rebeli, and consists of continued interaction between the caterpillar and the host ants. Once in the nest, the caterpillar uses acoustic mimicry to hide its identity. The large blue larvae using the cuckoo strategy stay in close quarters with the ants while producing a noise very similar to that of a larval queen ant. By mimicking a queen, larvae are fed by the worker ants and are given preferential treatment over the real ant larvae. Cuckoo strategy users become such high-status members of the nest that the ants will kill their own larvae to feed the caterpillar and will rescue the caterpillar first in the face of danger.

===== Predator strategy =====
Unlike other members of the genus Phengaris, the large blue becomes a predator once in the ant nest. It feeds on the ant pupae while continuing to pose as a Myrmica ant. Even with mimicry, mortality for the large blue within the nest is high. One explanation is that each species of Phengaris is most suited for a single species of Myrmica. Caterpillars that are adopted by an unfamiliar species of ant are often killed and eaten. Even if matched with the correct host, many large blue butterflies are unable to survive. If the mimicry is not perfect and the ants become suspicious, death is highly likely. Further, ants in nests without a consistent supply of food are much more likely to identify the large blue as an intruder. Large blue caterpillars are most likely to be attacked during the first 10 days after being adopted by the host ants. This is because in this time the caterpillars become larger than typical Myrmica ant larvae.

===== Mimicry =====
Even once Phengaris butterflies have infiltrated the host nest, they continue to hide their identity as caterpillars and will go further in their act of deception. There have been many studies documenting the use of acoustic communication in ants, and it has been found that members of the genus Phengaris exploit this behaviour. For example, P. rebeli mimics the unique sound of the queen to elevate its status in the nest. This mimicry is effective enough to cause worker ants to prefer to rescue the P. rebeli over their own pupae in times of danger.

Previously it had been thought that only "cuckoo" strategy species used acoustic mimicry. The sound was so similar, that the sounds of the two caterpillars differed more than each did compared to the sound of the queen. Different Myrmica species utilize distinct semiochemicals to distinguish themselves, but they use very similar acoustic commands once in the nest.

===== Lab studies and applications =====
Laboratory studies have shown that large blue butterfly larvae first consume the largest ant larvae. This evolved tactic maximizes efficiency not only because the largest larvae provide the most substance by volume, but also because it prevents the larvae pupating and becoming inaccessible prey. Further, it allows more newly hatched larvae time to grow bigger. While in the nest, large blue caterpillars acquire 99% of their final biomass, growing from an average of 1.3 mg to 173 mg. Results from laboratories estimate that 230 large larvae and a minimum of 354 Myrmica workers are needed to ensure the survival of one butterfly; however, such a large nest is very rarely found in the wild. This supports findings that large blue butterflies are extremely capable of withstanding starvation. This becomes extremely beneficial in situations when the ants desert the colony and leave the caterpillar behind. Large blue butterflies have been known to be capable of migrating to new nests once the original is deserted. In many cases, a nearby colony with a fresh brood will populate the nest allowing the surviving large blues to sequentially parasitize multiple Myrmica colonies.

===== Cuckoo vs. predatory strategies =====
Scientists remain unsure why there are multiple strategies within the host nest, but studies have been conducted to determine the effectiveness of each. The cuckoo strategy results in six times more butterflies per nest than the predatory strategy. While this seems to indicate a dominance of the cuckoo strategy, there are other factors to consider. Since the cuckoo caterpillars remain in close vicinity of the ants, they must secrete chemicals that are almost identical to the host species in order to survive. This explains why cuckoo strategy users are more likely to be predated by the host colony when adopted by a non-primary host than predatory strategy users. Current data seem to support the idea that cuckoo strategy users depend on a specific species of Myrmica ant while predatory Phengaris are more versatile overall but still perform better with a specific species.

===== The queen effect =====
It has been found that large blue butterflies are three times less likely to survive in nests that have queen ants present. This discovery has been explained with a theory called the "queen effect". In most Myrmica nests, the queen ant will lay two main batches of eggs, and the females that hatch from these eggs will either become workers or virgin queens. Whether these females become workers or virgin queens is dependent on the status of the queen in the nest. If the queen dies, worker ants have the largest of the female larvae transition into virgin queens. If the queen is present and healthy, she influences the nurse workers to neglect, starve and bite the female larvae which results in restricted growth and aids in the transition to workers. This indicates that Phengaris butterflies must maintain a strict balance between mimicking the queen in the presence of workers and appearing to be a worker to avoid the queen.

== See also ==
- List of butterflies of Great Britain
