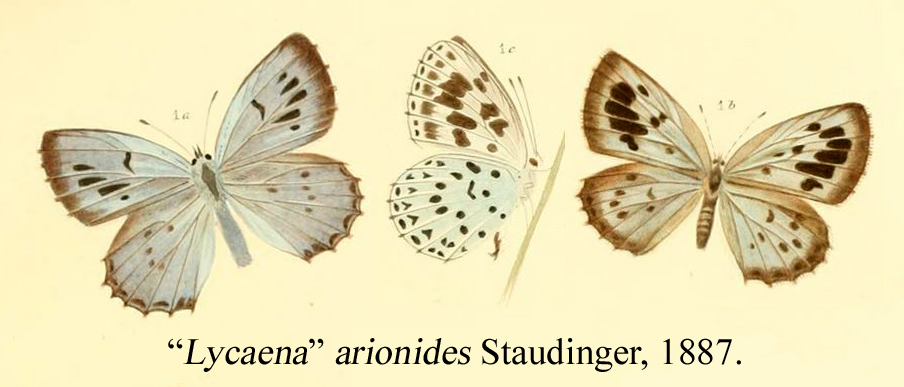
- Phengaris arionides

Conservation status
- Near Threatened (IUCN 2.3)

Scientific classification
- Kingdom: Animalia
- Phylum: Arthropoda
- Class: Insecta
- Order: Lepidoptera
- Family: Lycaenidae
- Genus: Phengaris
- Species: P. arionides

Binomial name
- Phengaris arionides (Staudinger, 1887)

Synonyms
- Maculinea arionides (Staudinger, 1887)

= Greater large blue =

Species of butterfly

The greater large blue (Phengaris arionides) is a species of butterfly in the family Lycaenidae.

It is found in Northeast China, Japan, and the Russian Far East.
