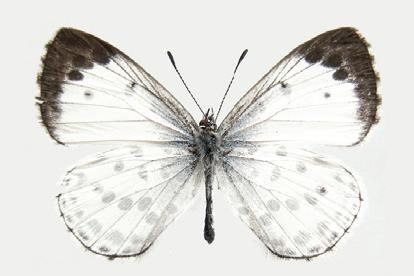
- Upperside
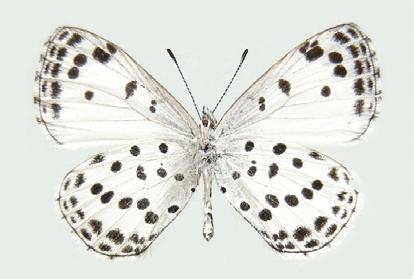
- Underside

Scientific classification
- Kingdom: Animalia
- Phylum: Arthropoda
- Clade: Pancrustacea
- Class: Insecta
- Order: Lepidoptera
- Family: Lycaenidae
- Genus: Phengaris
- Species: P. xiushani

Binomial name
- Phengaris xiushani Wang & Settele, 2010

= Phengaris xiushani =

Species of butterfly

Phengaris xiushani is a species of butterfly of the family Lycaenidae. It is only known from Yunnan in China.

The forewing length is 21 mm for males.
