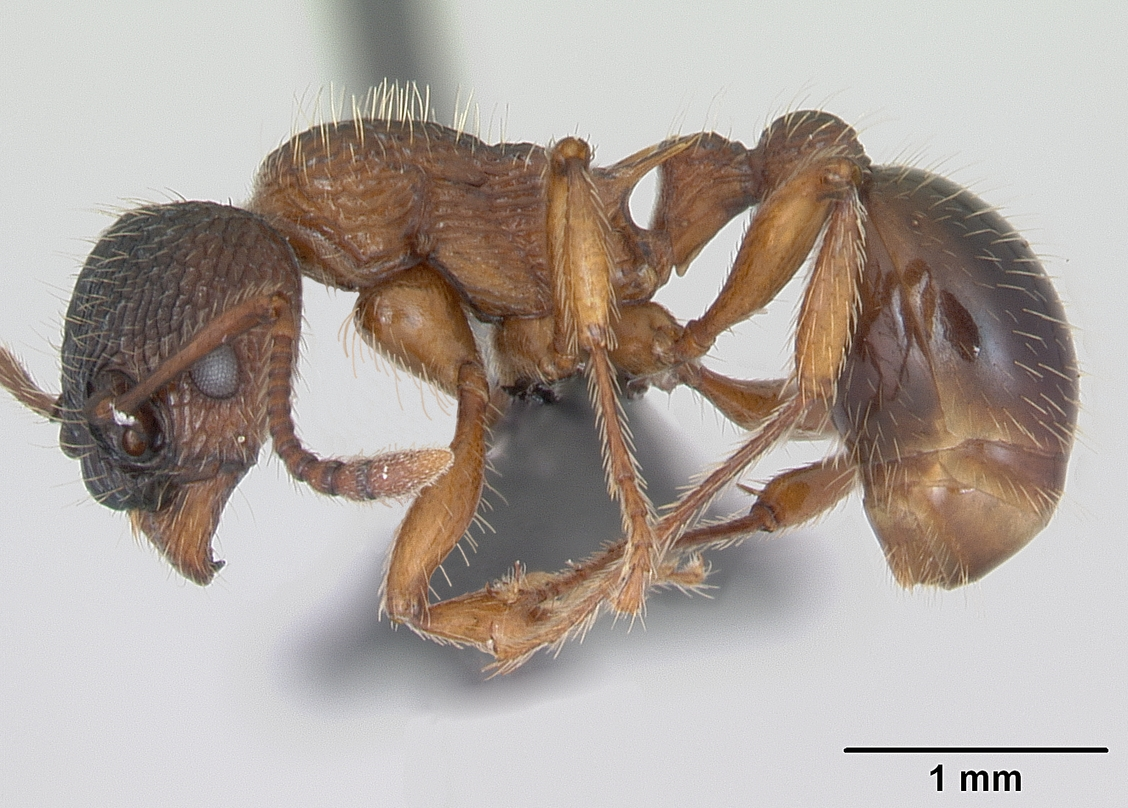
- Worker

Scientific classification
- Kingdom: Animalia
- Phylum: Arthropoda
- Class: Insecta
- Order: Hymenoptera
- Family: Formicidae
- Subfamily: Myrmicinae
- Genus: Myrmica
- Species: M. schencki

Binomial name
- Myrmica schencki Viereck, 1903

= Myrmica schencki =

Species of ant

Myrmica schencki is a species of ant in the genus Myrmica.

== Distribution and habitat ==
Myrmica schencki is distributed across Europe (from Great Britain, Sweden, Finland in the North to Spain, Italy and the Balkans in the South), the Caucasus, Turkey, also in West Siberia, Kazakhstan, the Tien-Shan and Altai Mountains, and near Krasnoyarsk in East Siberia. It inhabits dry habitats in open areas and forests. Nests are found in the ground, occasionally in tussocks of grass or moss. Colonies are polygynous with up to 1000 workers. Recent research has shown that this species may partially feed on pollen – a phenomenon rarely documented in ants.

== Parasitism ==
M. schencki is parasitized by Phengaris rebeli larvae, which release chemicals that trick the ants into believing that the butterfly larvae are ant larvae and should be brought back to the ant brood. In the ant nest, the P. rebeli larvae and pupa are able to mimic the sound that the queen of the ant colony makes, causing the ants to preferentially feed the P. rebeli larvae over their own larvae. While the workers are unable to distinguish the queen from the P. rebeli larvae and pupae, the queen begins to treat the P. rebeli larvae and pupae as rivals. Less commonly, M. schecncki may also be parasitized by Phengaris arion. Unlike P. rebeli, P. arion adopts more of a predatory relationship with the ants which is generally viewed as a less successful strategy.
