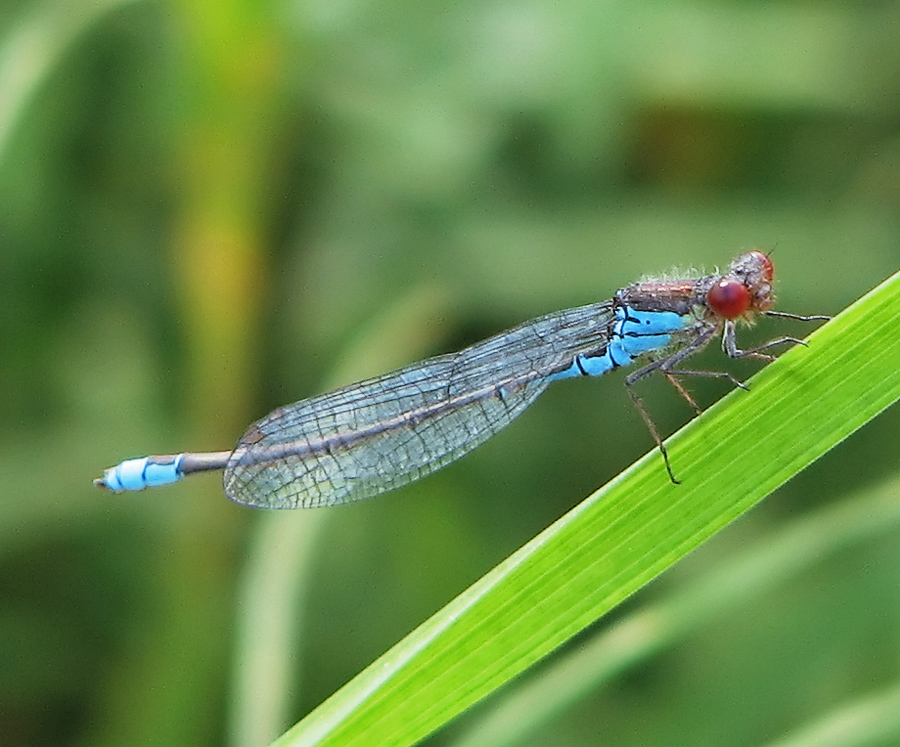
- Erythromma viridulum (male)

Scientific classification
- Domain: Eukaryota
- Kingdom: Animalia
- Phylum: Arthropoda
- Class: Insecta
- Order: Odonata
- Suborder: Zygoptera
- Family: Coenagrionidae
- Genus: Erythromma
- Species: E. viridulum

Binomial name
- Erythromma viridulum (Charpentier, 1840)

= Small red-eyed damselfly =

Species of damselfly

The small red-eyed damselfly (Erythromma viridulum) is a member of the damselfly family Coenagrionidae. It is very similar to the red-eyed damselfly.

== Appearance ==
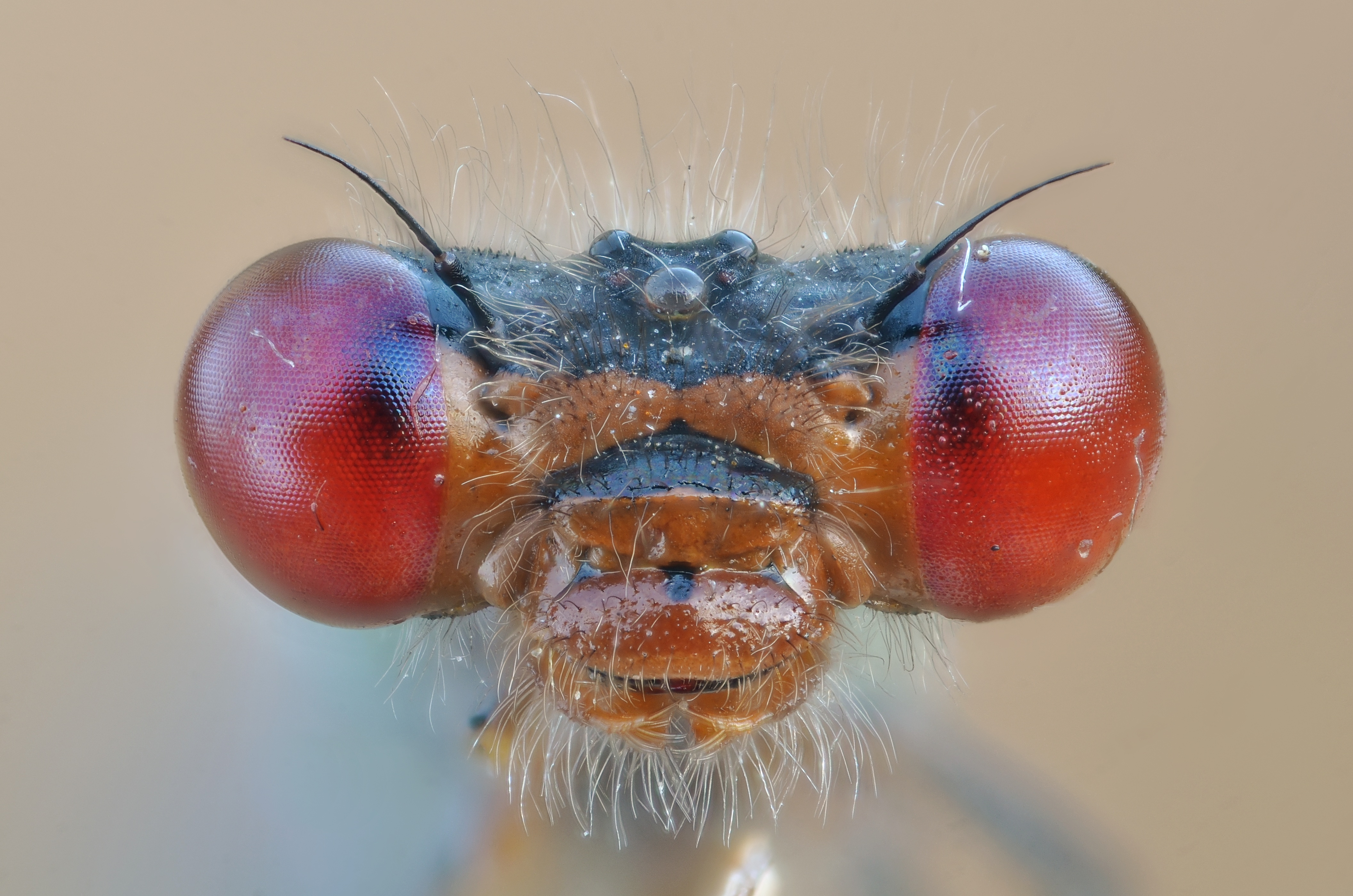
Eyes

The species is a small damselfly, about 29 millimetres (1.1 in) long, predominantly black with iridescent blue markings. Its large, spaced eyes are a deep red. Like the red-eyed damselfly, both sexes lack pale spots behind the eyes and have pale brown pterostigmata. The male has a bronze-black top and blue sides. The sides of the female's thorax are yellow, green or blue. The rear edge of the pronotum is rounded.

Viewed from the side, the second and eighth segment of the abdomen of the male are mostly blue, which distinguishes it from the red-eyed damselfly where these are mostly black.

== Breeding ==
This damselfly breeds in ponds, lakes and ditches and, in continental Europe, sluggish rivers. It seems to be well able to tolerate brackish water. It seems to be associated with floating vegetation such as Hornwort and Water Milfoil (Myriophyllum).

Eggs are laid while in tandem, into the stems and leaves of floating plants. The larvae live amongst pondweed and probably emerge after a year.

== Behaviour ==
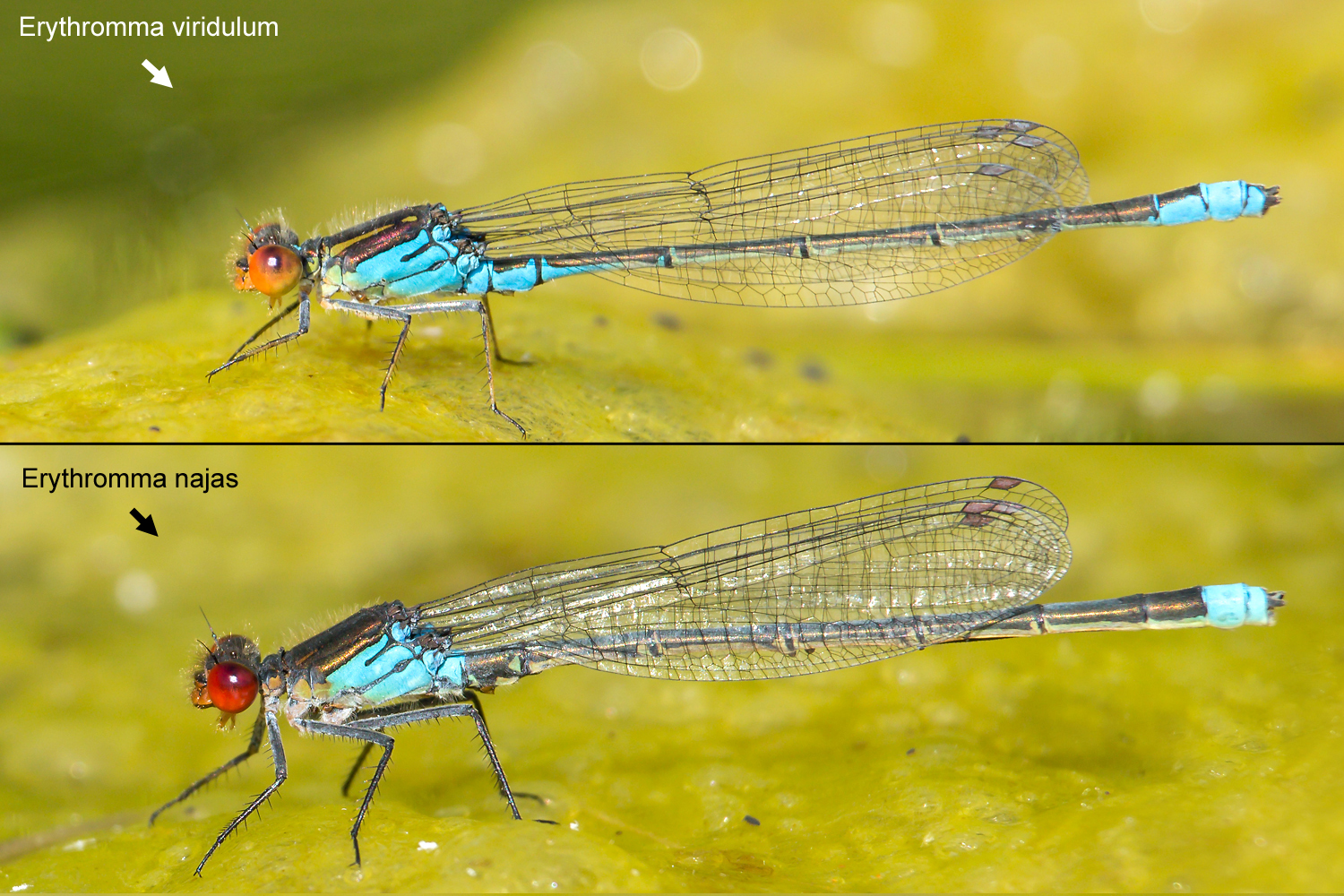
Comparison between males of Erythromma viridulum (top) and Erythromma najas (bottom); notice the differences in the distribution of the blue markings

Mating occurs either on floating plants or at the margins. When perched on floating plants, the male holds its abdomen slightly upcurved (the red-eyed damselfly holds it straight).

== Colonisation of Britain ==
The populations of this species in northwest Europe increased in the latter part of the 20th century, and in 1999 the species was recorded in Britain for the first time. It has since increased its range considerably and become an established breeding resident. The first British record was in Essex on 17 July 1999 and is documented in Dewick and Gerussi (2000). Breeding was finally proven in 2002.

== Gallery ==
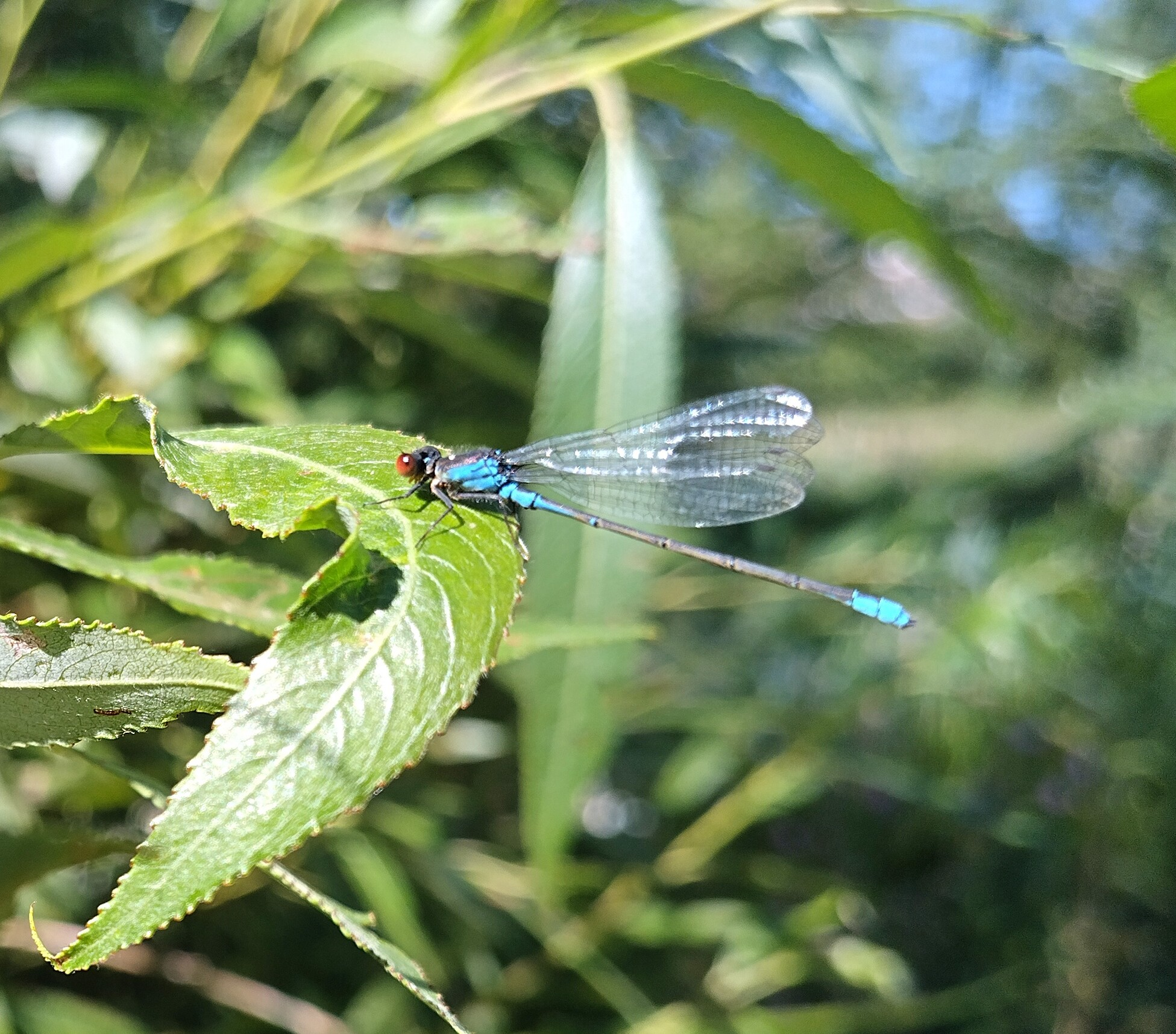
In Salary Brook Local Nature Reserve, Colchester, August 2024.

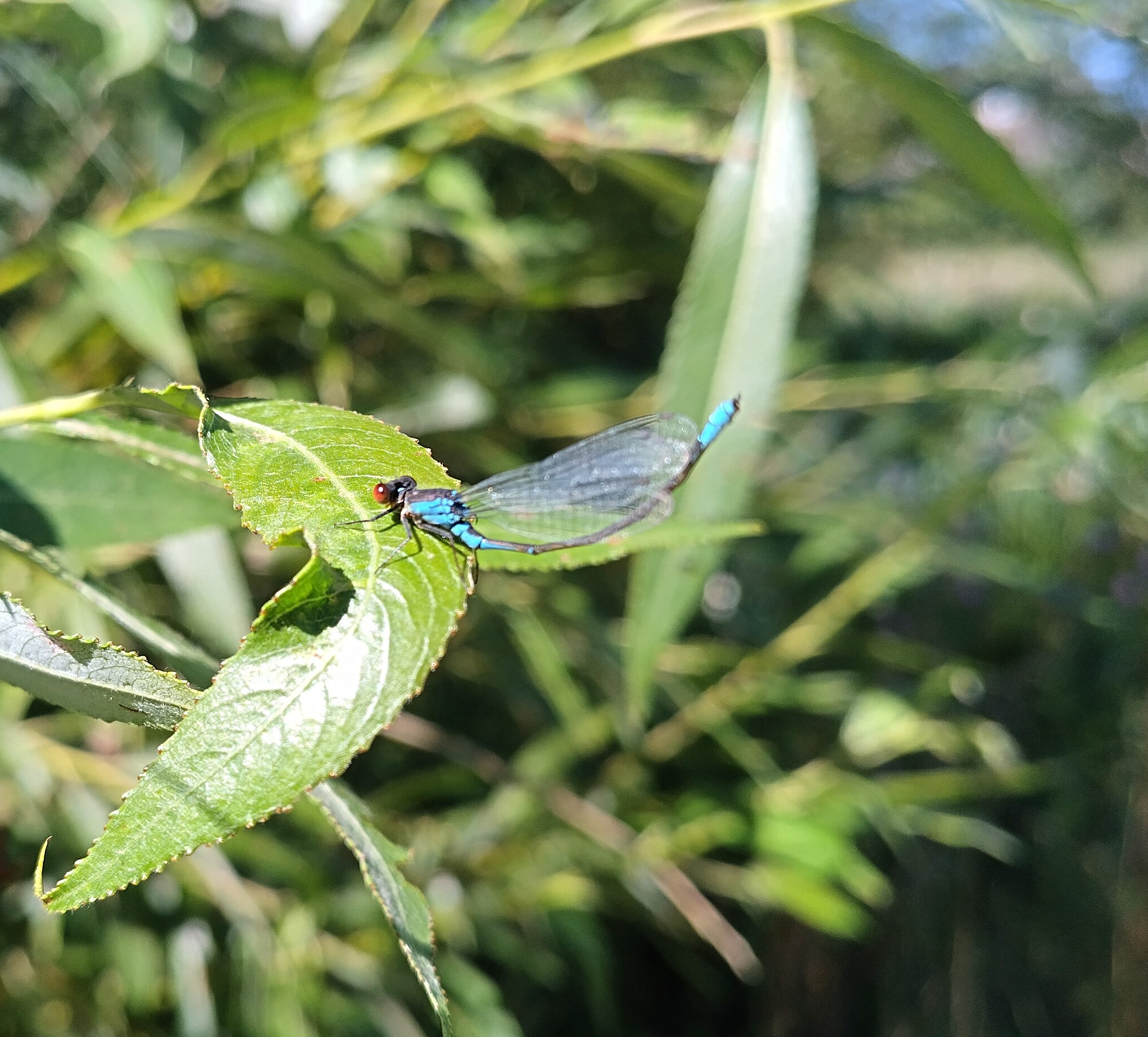
Obelisking in Salary Brook Local Nature Reserve, Colchester, August 2024.
