= Emma Hutchinson =

Victorian lepidopterist

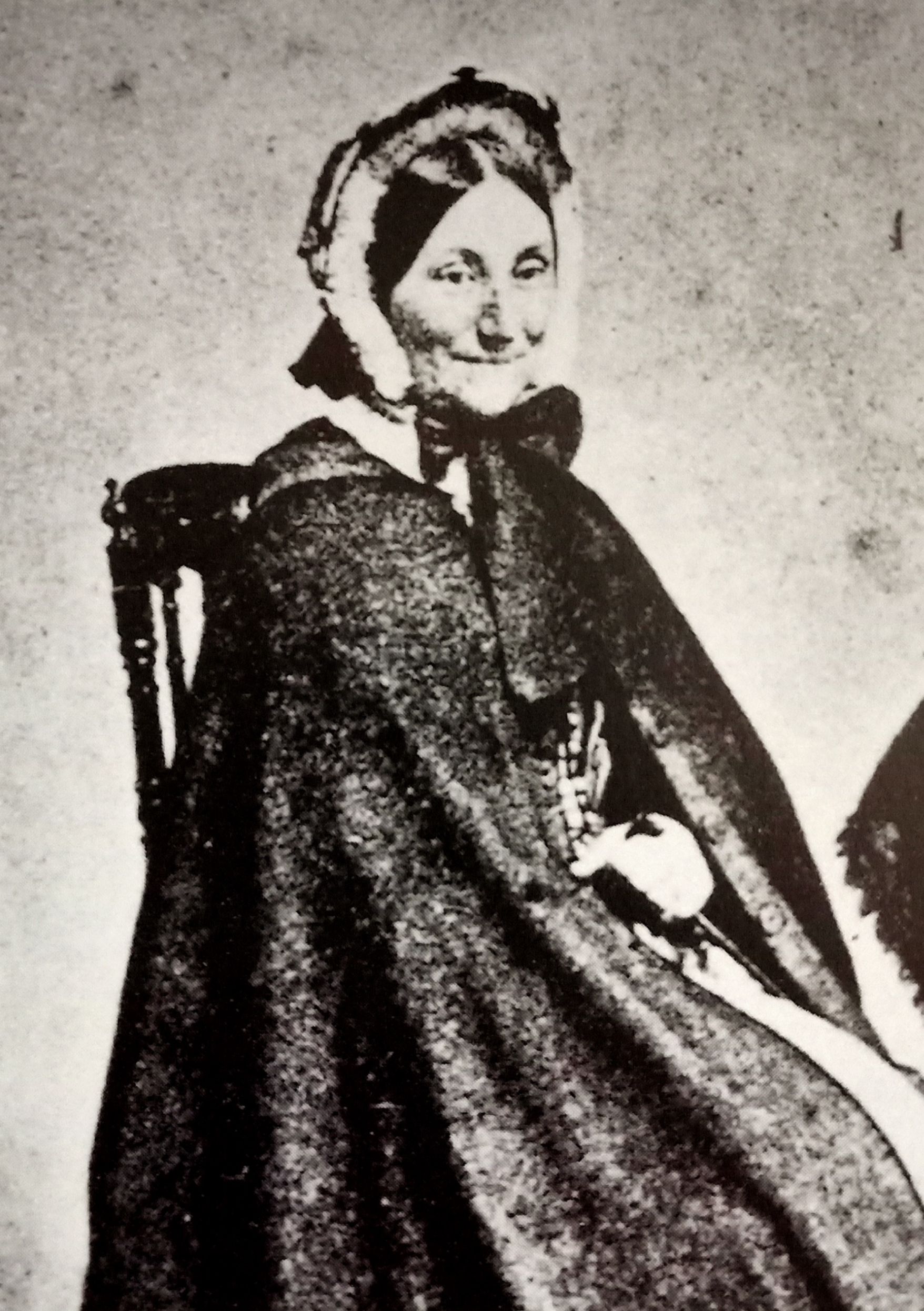
- Born: Emma Sarah Gill; 1820
- Died: 10 December 1905
- Occupations: Non-fiction writer, entomologist
- Notable work: Entomology and Botany as Pursuits for Ladies

Emma Sarah Hutchinson (1820–10 December 1905) was a British, Victorian, lepidopterist who authored the 1879 book Entomology and Botany as Pursuits for Ladies and published in The Entomologist's Record and Journal of Variation. She reared butterflies and moths from eggs and her work contributed to understanding of the Lepidoptera life cycle. The summer form of the Polygonia c-album butterfly species, known as the comma, is named hutchinsoni in her honour.

== Early life ==
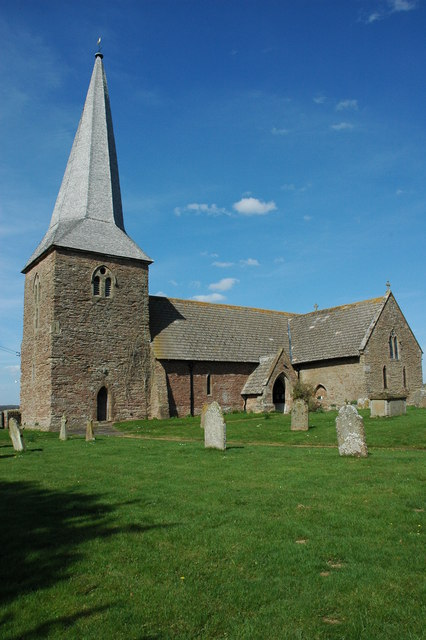
St James the Great, the parish church of Kimbolton

Born as Emma Sarah Gill in 1820, she married Thomas Hutchinson (1815-1903), (Note: Thomas Hutchinson was nephew of Mary, the wife of William Wordsworth. He served at Kimbolton for 62 years from 1841. He was a botanist, whose herbarium was described in 1949 as "not traced".) the vicar of the parish of Kimbolton, Herefordshire, England, in 1847 and spent most of her life there. The couple occupied a cottage called Grantsfield. Hutchinson's interest in butterflies and moths (Lepidoptera) started when her young son Thomas captured a swallow-tailed moth.

== Scientific practice ==
Hutchinson devoted much of her life to the study butterflies and moths, the insect order Lepidoptera. She became known during her lifetime for her skills in rearing butterflies and moths from eggs. She bred the pinion-spotted pug moth for 31 years. Her work contributed to a better understanding of the life cycle of Lepidoptera. She corresponded with well-known entomologists such as Edward Newman, Henry Doubleday, William Buckler, (Note: Hutchinson is mentioned several times as a contributor of specimens in Buckler's nine-volume The Larvae of the British Butterflies and Moths.) and Henry Tibbats Stainton. Despite her expertise she was unable to join the Woolhope Naturalists' Field Club as the club refused to admit women until 1954.

In the Victorian era, entomology was fashionable and natural history societies were well attended. Hutchinson's 1879 publication Entomology and Botany as Pursuits for Ladies went on to become a popular scientific publication. In it she encouraged women to study butterflies instead of just collecting them.

In 1881 her article on the possible decline of the Polygonia c-album butterfly species (then called Vanessa c-album), known as the comma, was published in The Entomologist. It was signed "E. S. Hutchinson", without reference to her gender. Hutchinson had studied the habits of the comma for 50 years and put forward the thesis that its decline in Kent was due to the burning of the hop vine after harvest, destroying the larvae and pupae. Hutchinson participated in efforts to reintroduce the comma to parts of England, including Surrey, by collecting comma larvae and pupae in Herefordshire and introducing them into the wild elsewhere. But Hutchinson was convinced that these efforts were hindered by naturalists who collected adult butterflies as specimens for their collections.

She also contributed to The Young Naturalist.

== Legacy ==
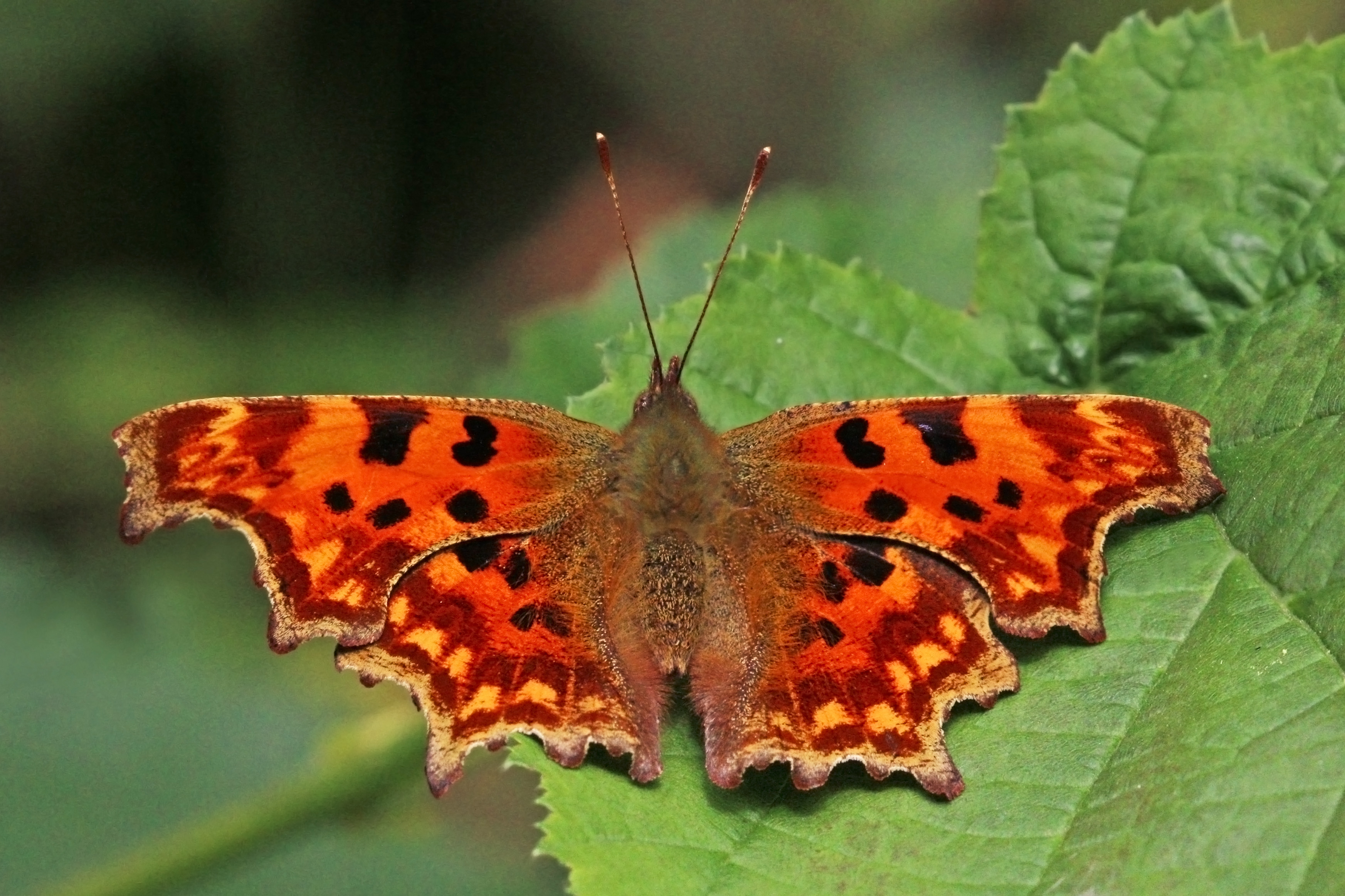
Polygonia c-album, form hutchinsoni

Of Hutchinson's seven children, four predeceased her. Her son Thomas (died 1916), a solicitor, was also a noted naturalist and eventually President of the Woolhope Society. Another, John (died 1945), collected butterflies in Natal, South Africa.

Hutchinson died at Grantsfield on 10 December 1905, aged 85. She and her children are all buried in Kimbolton churchyard.

In 1937 Hutchinson's collection of 20,000 butterflies and moths was exhibited in the Natural History Museum, Hutchinson's daughter Sarah having donated her mother's collection to that museum that year. Hutchinson's notebooks are held in the library of the Woolhope Naturalists' Field Club in Hereford.

The summer form of the Polygonia c-album butterfly species, known as the comma, is named hutchinsoni in her honour.

== See also ==
- Timeline of women in science
