= Glemsford Pits =

Biological Site of Special Scientific Interest in England

Coordinates: 52.084°N 0.685°E

- Site of Special Scientific Interest
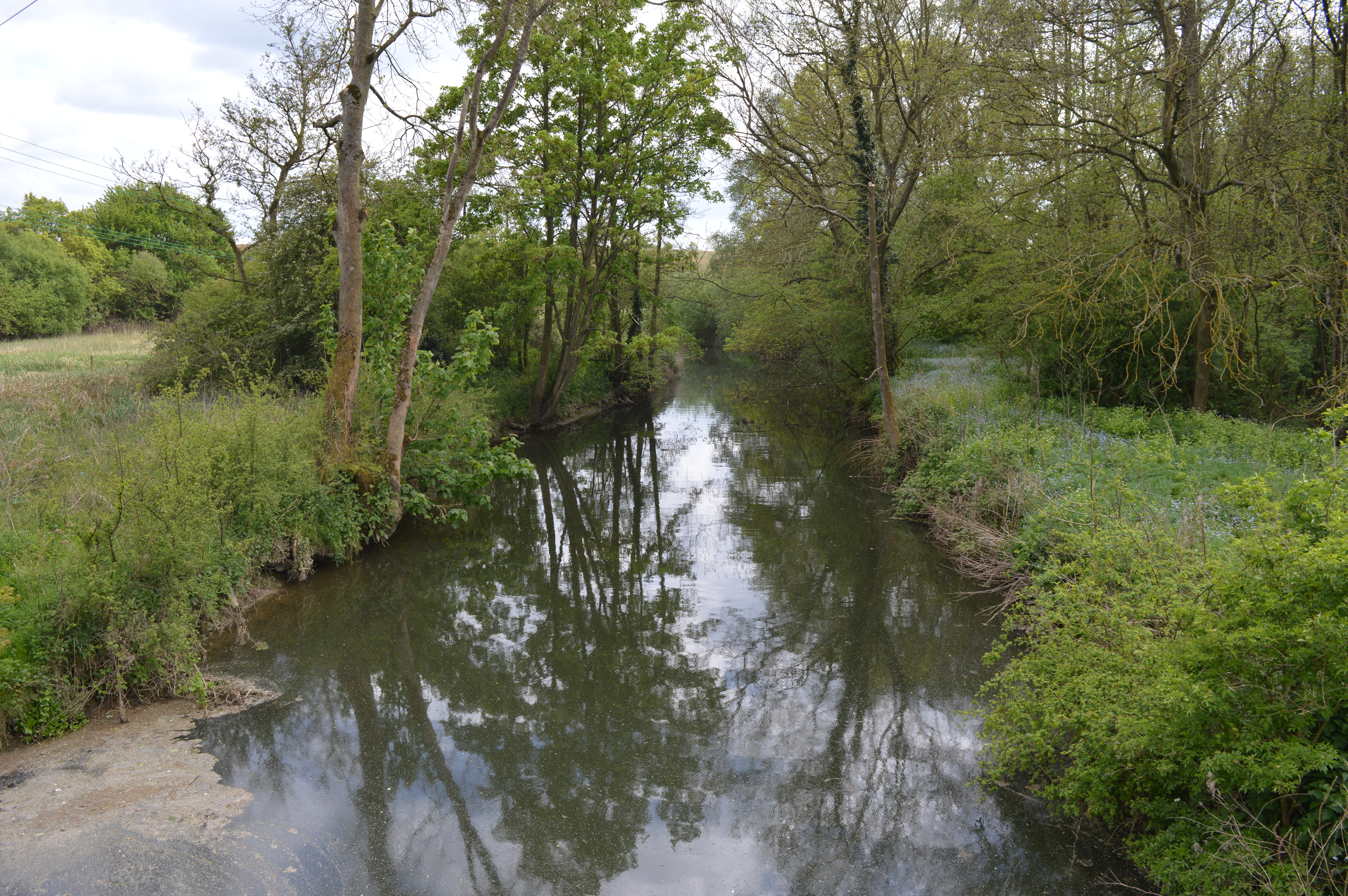
- The River Stour in Glemsford Pits
- Location of Glemsford Pits.
- Area of search: Suffolk; Essex
- Grid reference: TL840464
- Interest: Biological
- Area: 37.5 ha (93 acres)
- Notification date: 1988
- Location map: Magic Map

Glemsford Pits is a 37.5-hectare (93-acre) biological Site of Special Scientific Interest south of Glemsford in Suffolk. The River Stour, which forms the boundary between Suffolk and Essex, runs through the site, which is thus in both counties.

The site has gravel workings which are now disused and filled with water, as well as the river. Thirteen species of dragonfly and damselfly have been recorded, including one which is rare in Britain, the ruddy darter dragonfly, and two which are locally uncommon, the four-spotted chaser dragonfly and the red-eyed damselfly. Aquatic plants include the yellow water-lily and mare's tail. Rabbits graze acidic grassland, and there are also areas of woodland, scrub herb and fen.

Most of the site is private land with no public access, but a footpath runs through the western end.
