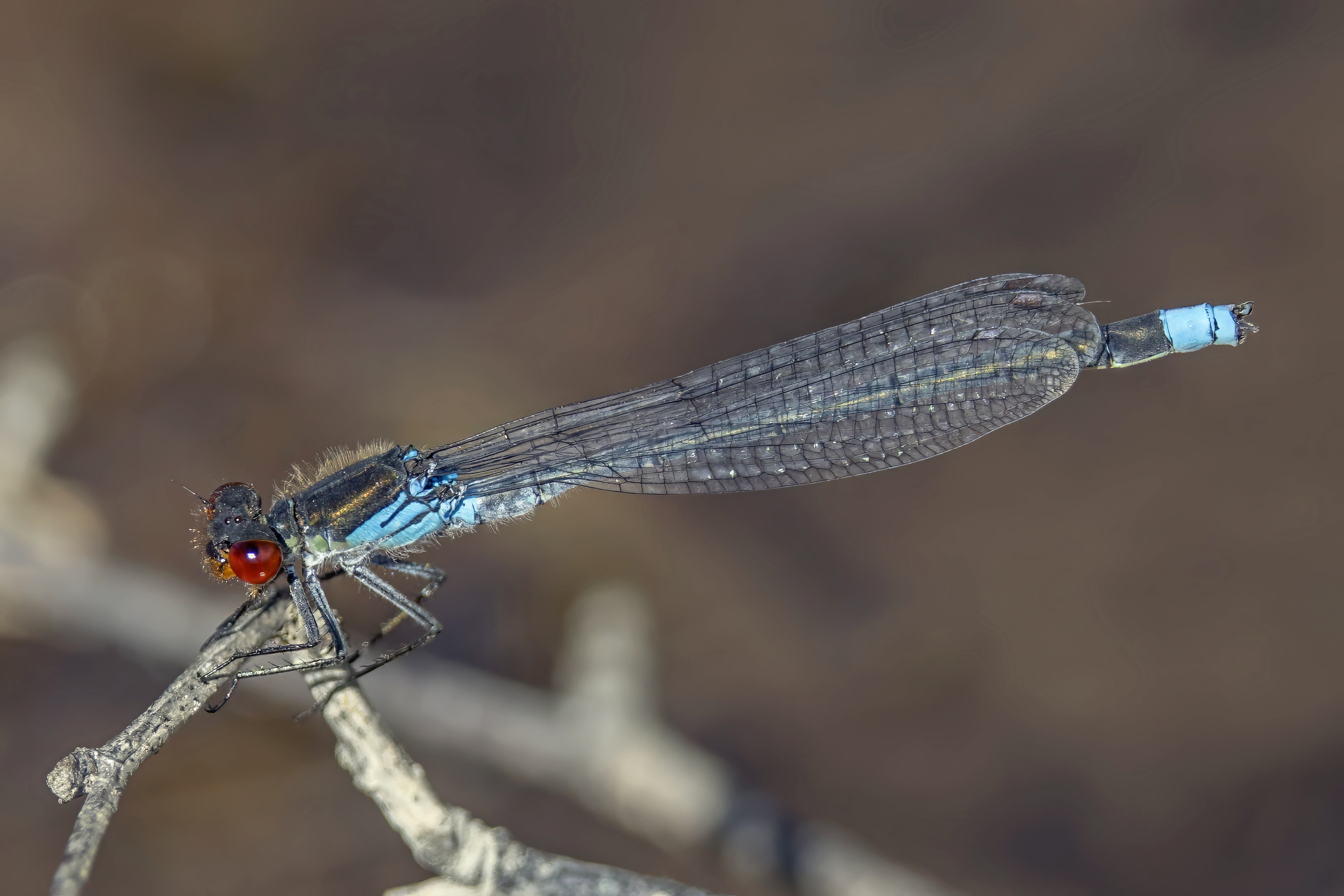
- Male

Scientific classification
- Domain: Eukaryota
- Kingdom: Animalia
- Phylum: Arthropoda
- Class: Insecta
- Order: Odonata
- Suborder: Zygoptera
- Family: Coenagrionidae
- Genus: Erythromma
- Species: E. najas

Binomial name
- Erythromma najas (Hansemann, 1823)

= Erythromma najas =

Species of damselfly

Erythromma najas, the red-eyed damselfly, is a member of the Coenagrionidae family of damselflies.

== Appearance ==
The species is a small damselfly, 35 millimetres (1.4 in) long, predominantly black with iridescent blue markings. The male resembles blue-tailed damselflies (Ischnura species) but is distinguished by its large, spaced eyes that are a deep red. It is very similar to the small red-eyed damselfly (Erythromma viridulum).

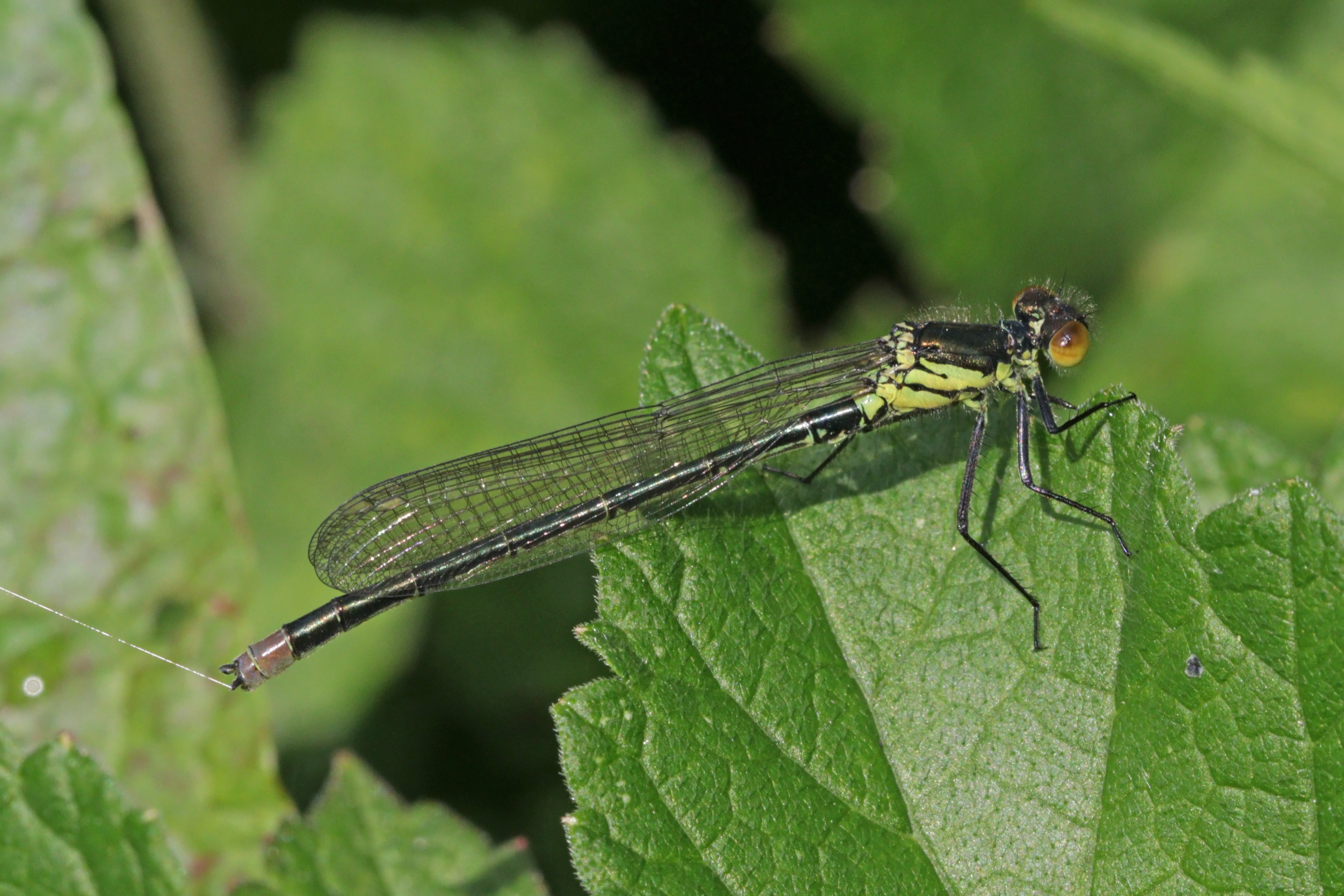
teneral male

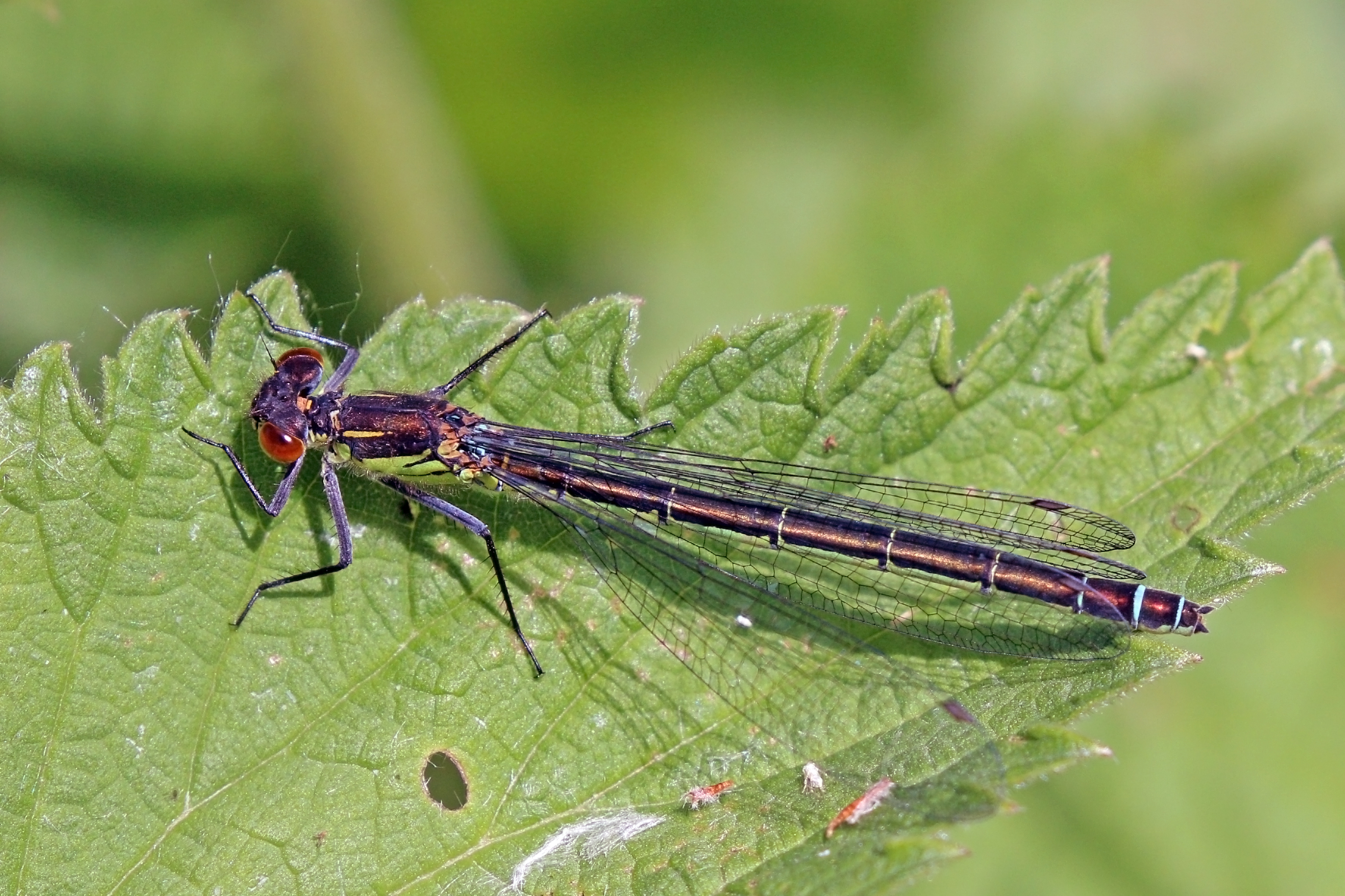
female

== Behaviour ==
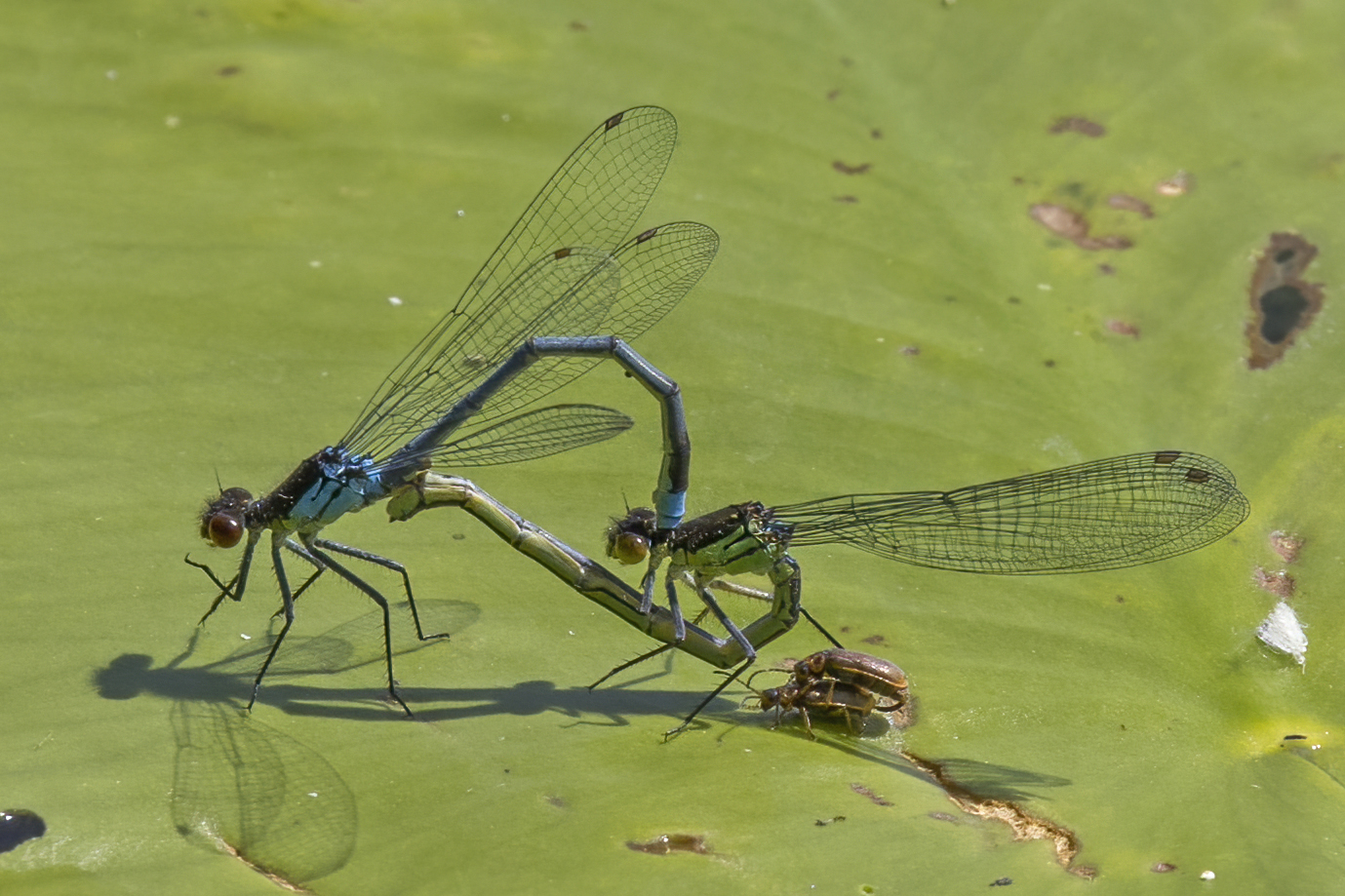
Red-eyed damselflies (Erythromma najas) mating

Males typically spend much of their time perched on the leaves of floating vegetation such as water lilies or mats of algae.
