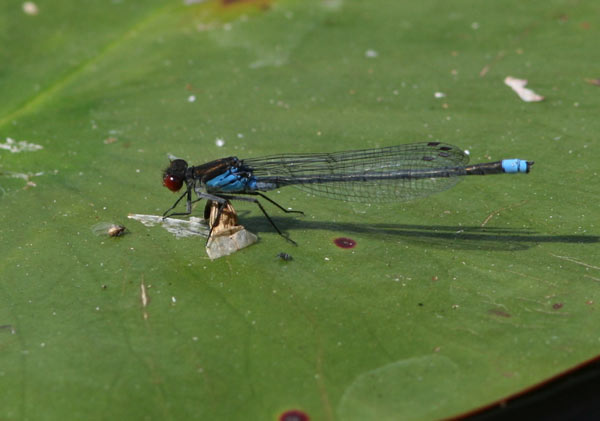
- Erythromma najas

Scientific classification
- Kingdom: Animalia
- Phylum: Arthropoda
- Class: Insecta
- Order: Odonata
- Suborder: Zygoptera
- Family: Coenagrionidae
- Genus: Erythromma; Charpentier, 1840

= Erythromma =

Genus of damselflies

Erythromma is a genus of three species of damselfly in the family Coenagrionidae, native to Europe and Asia. It contains the following species:

- Erythromma lindenii (Selys, 1840) – Blue-eye
- Erythromma najas (Hansemann, 1823) – Large Redeye
- Erythromma viridulum Charpentier, 1840 – Small Redeye
