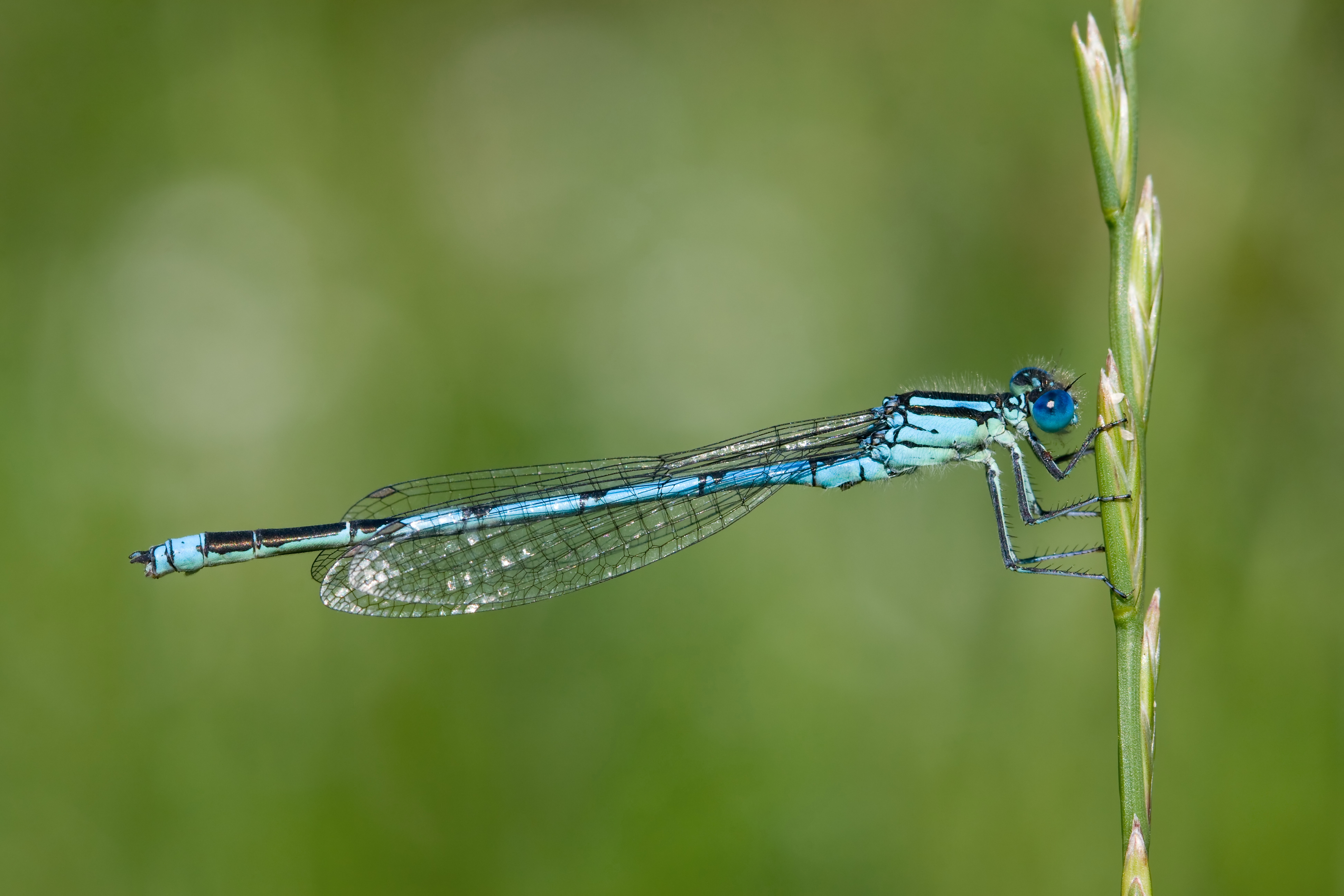

Scientific classification
- Domain: Eukaryota
- Kingdom: Animalia
- Phylum: Arthropoda
- Class: Insecta
- Order: Odonata
- Suborder: Zygoptera
- Family: Coenagrionidae
- Genus: Erythromma
- Species: E. lindenii

Binomial name
- Erythromma lindenii (Selys, 1840)

Synonyms
- Coenagrion lindenii; Cercion lindenii

= Goblet-marked damselfly =

Species of damselfly

The goblet-marked damselfly (Erythromma lindenii) is a medium-sized blue-and-black (or green-and-black) damselfly in the pond damselfly family (Coenagrionidae). It's a fairly common species in the South and West of Europe but is not found in the British Isles, Scandinavia and Eastern Europe. Erythromma lindenii was previously known as Coenagrion lindenii and Cercion lindenii. The goblet-marked damselfly is also known as the blue-eye. It's an easily recognized species, with its wide antehumeral stripes, narrow postocular spots, the male's very bright-blue eyes. He has very long and curved appendages, and the spear-shaped marks on S3-S6 of his abdomen.

It can also be found in Asia: Russian Federation and it is also found in Africa.

== Subspecies ==
Erythromma lindenii has three subspecies. The following are the subspecies.

- Erythromma lindenii lacustre (Beutler, 1985)
- Erythromma lindenii lindenii (Selys, 1840)
- Erythromma lindenii zernyi (Schmidt, 1938)
