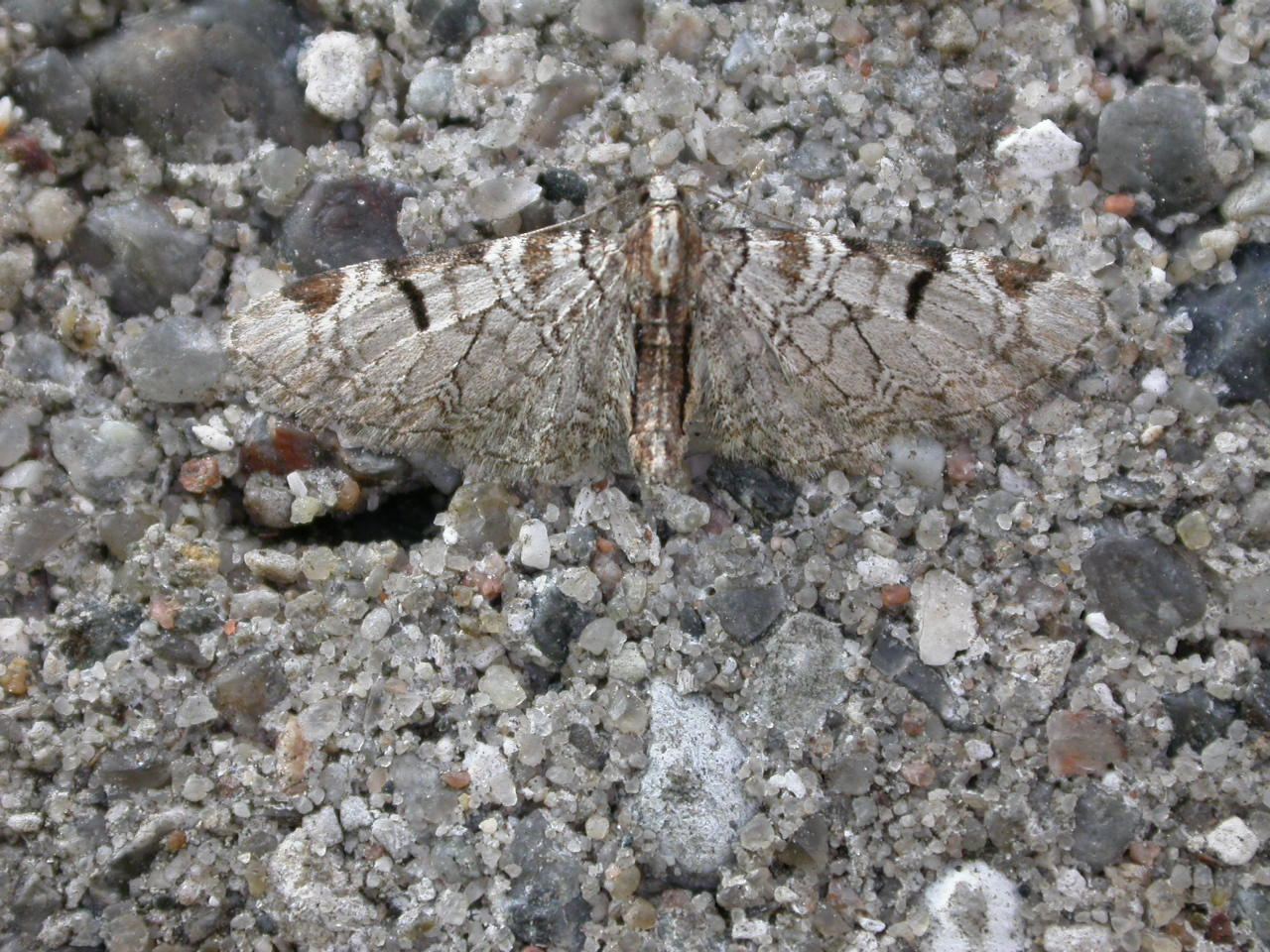

Scientific classification
- Domain: Eukaryota
- Kingdom: Animalia
- Phylum: Arthropoda
- Class: Insecta
- Order: Lepidoptera
- Family: Geometridae
- Genus: Eupithecia
- Species: E. insigniata

Binomial name
- Eupithecia insigniata (Hübner, 1790)

Synonyms
- Phalaena insigniata Hubner, 1790; Phalaena consignata Borkhausen, 1794

= Eupithecia insigniata =

Species of moth

Eupithecia insigniata, the pinion-spotted pug, is a moth of the family Geometridae. The species can be found in Europe and Turkey.

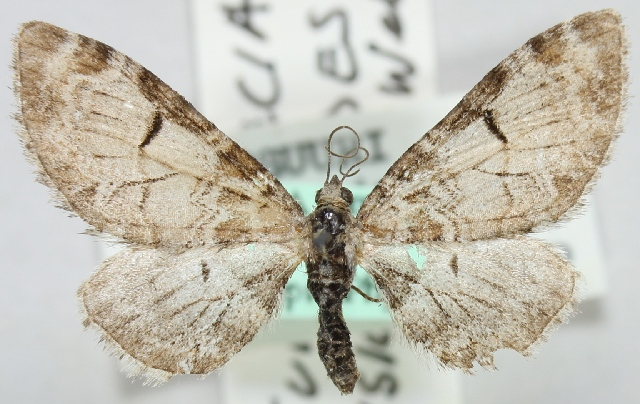
Eupithecia insigniata insignioides

The wingspan is 18–22 mm. The moths flies from April to May depending on the location.

The larvae feed on Crataegus and Malus species.

== Subspecies ==
- Eupithecia insigniata insigniata
- Eupithecia insigniata insignioides Wehrli, 1923
