= Johann Wilhelm Adolf Hansemann =

German entomologist

Johann Wilhelm Adolf Hansemann (14 May 1784, Finkenwerder Hamburg– 26 July 1862, Diepholz) was a German entomologist and insect dealer.

Prediger was a Pastor in Leese.

== Works ==
- Hansemann, J. W. A. (1823) Anfang einer Auseinanderseßung der deutschen Arten der Gattung Agrion F. Zoologisches Magazin (Wiedemann): 2 (1): 148-161.
- Hansemann, J. W. A. (1862) Vertilgung der Eier und Raupen des ungleichen Spinners und anderer Ungezieferarten.Zeitschrift für deutsche Landwirthe, N. F., Leipzig - 13 167
