= Salary Brook Local Nature Reserve =

Nature reserve in Colchester, England

Coordinates: 51.8858°N 0.94396°E

Salary Brook
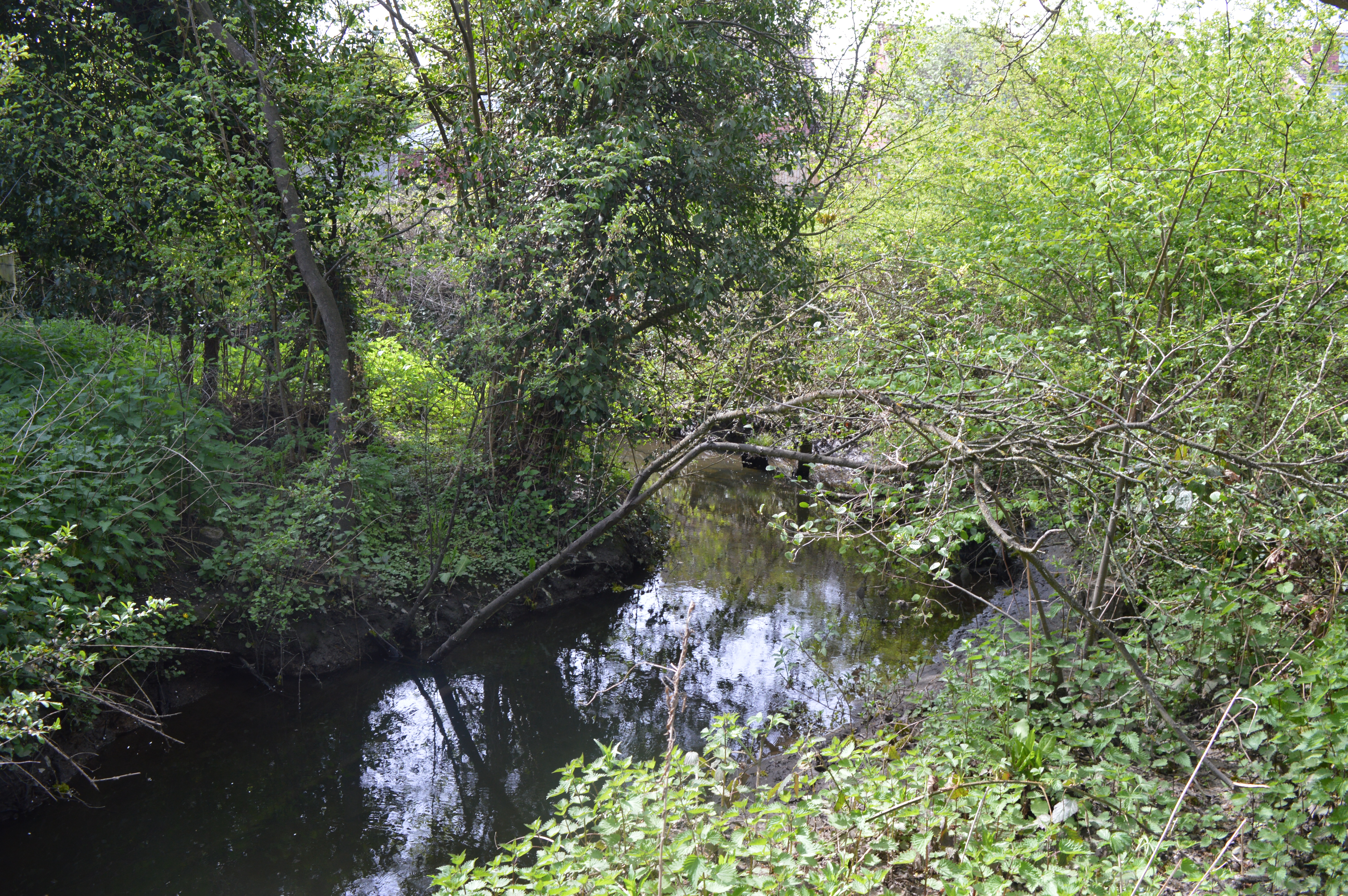
- Interactive map of Salary Brook
- Type: Local Nature Reserve
- Location: Colchester, Essex
- OS grid: TM027249
- Area: 17.1 hectares (42 acres)
- Manager: Colchester Borough Council

Salary Brook Local Nature Reserve is a 17.1 hectare Local Nature Reserve covering a stretch of Salary Brook and its banks on the south-east outskirts of Colchester in Essex. It is owned and managed by Colchester Borough Council.

The site has a variety of habitats, with the brook itself, pasture, ponds and marsh. Fauna include four species of bats, water voles, lizards, nightingales and reed warblers. Berrimans Pasture has over one hundred plants, particularly ones typical of unimproved damp grasslands.

There is access from Scarfe Way, Sherbourne Road, Titania Close and Sandpiper Close.
